= List of Mexican films of 1953 =

A list of the films produced in Mexico in 1953 (see 1953 in film):

== 1953 ==
Title	Director	Cast	Genre	Notes
1953
Anxiety	Miguel Zacarías	Pedro Infante, Libertad Lamarque, Irma Dorantes	Musical drama	
The Boy and the Fog	Roberto Gavaldón	Dolores del Río, Pedro López Lagar, Eduardo Noriega	Drama	Entered into the 1954 Cannes Film Festival
El Bruto	Luis Buñuel	Pedro Armendáriz, Katy Jurado		
Cinnamon Skin	Juan José Ortega	Sara Montiel, Manolo Fábregas, Ramón Gay	Drama	
Cock o' the Walk	Roberto Rodríguez	Sara Montiel, Joaquín Cordero, Freddy Fernández	Comedy	
La Cobarde	Julio Bracho	Irasema Dilián, Ernesto Alonso		
Dos tipos de cuidado	Ismael Rodríguez	Pedro Infante, Jorge Negrete, Carmelita González		
Él	Luis Buñuel	Arturo de Córdova		
Ella, Lucifer y yo	Miguel Morayta	Sara Montiel, Abel Salazar, Carlos López Moctezuma		
Eugenia Grandet	Emilio Gómez Muriel	Marga López, Julio Villarreal, Andrea Palma	Drama	
Forbidden Fruit	Alfredo B. Crevenna	Irasema Dilián, Arturo de Córdova	Drama	
Genius and Figure	Fernando Méndez	Luis Aguilar, Esther Fernández, Linda Cristal	Comedy	
The Ghost Falls In Love	Rafael Portillo	Gloria Marín, Abel Salazar, Ramón Gay	Comedy	
Here Come the Freeloaders	Gilberto Martínez Solares	Lilia del Valle, Antonio Espino, Manuel Palacios	Comedy	
Hotel Room	Adolfo Fernández Bustamante	Lilia Prado, Roberto Cañedo, Sara Guasch	Drama	
The Island of Women	Rafael Baledón	Tin-Tan, Lilia del Valle, Fernando Soto	Comedy	
It Happened in Acapulco	Alejandro Galindo	Martha Roth, Raúl Martínez, Domingo Soler	Comedy	
The Last Round	Alejandro Galindo	Emilia Guiú, José María Linares-Rivas, Domingo Soler	Sports drama	
The Lottery Ticket Seller	Raphael J. Sevilla	David Silva, Esther Fernández, Rodolfo Acosta	Drama	
El mariachi desconocido (Tin Tan en La Habana)	Gilberto Martínez Solares	Tin-Tan, Rosa de Castilla, Marcelo Chávez, Tito Novaro		
Me traes de un ala	Gilberto Martínez Solares	Tin Tan, Silvia Pinal		
My Three Merry Widows	Fernando Cortés	Silvia Pinal, Amalia Aguilar, Lilia del Valle	Comedy	
The Naked Woman	Fernando Méndez	Meche Barba, Antonio Aguilar, Miguel Torruco	Drama	
Pepe the Bull	Ismael Rodríguez	Pedro Infante, Amanda del Llano, Joaquín Cordero, Evita Muñoz	Sports	
The Photographer	Miguel M. Delgado	Cantinflas, Rosita Arenas, Ángel Garasa	Comedy thriller	
Pompeyo el Conquistador	Rene Corona			
The Proud and the Beautiful	Yves Allégret, Rafael E. Portas	Michèle Morgan, Gérard Philipe, Carlos López Moctezuma	Drama	Mexican/French co-production
Quiero Vivír	Alberto Gout	Jorge Mistral, Meche Barba, Julio Villarreal		
Reportaje	Emilio Fernández	Pedro Infante, Jorge Negrete, María Félix, Dolores del Río, Tin-Tan, Carmen Sevilla, Libertad Lamarque, Lola Flores		
Rosanna	Emilio Fernández	Rossana Podestà, Armando Silvestre		Entered into the 1953 Cannes Film Festival
La Segunda Mujer	José Díaz Morales	Rosa Carmina, Antonio Aguilar		
Siete Mujeres	Juan Bustillo Oro	Alma Rosa Aguirre, Prudencia Griffel		
The Spot of the Family	Fernando Méndez	Luis Aguilar, Antonio Badú, Sara García	Comedy	
The Strange Passenger	Fernando A. Rivero	Emilia Guiú, Víctor Manuel Mendoza, Tito Junco	Mystery	
The Sword of Granada	Edward Dein, Carlos Véjar hijo	Cesar Romero, Katy Jurado, Rebeca Iturbide	Adventure	
Las Tres perfectas casadas	Roberto Gavaldón			Entered into the 1953 Cannes Film Festival
You Had to Be a Gypsy	Rafael Baledón	Pedro Infante, Carmen Sevilla, Estrellita Castro	Comedy	Co-production with Spain
A Divorce	Emilio Gómez Muriel	Marga López, Carlos López Moctezuma, Elda Peralta		
Ambiciosa	Ernesto Cortázar	Meche Barba, Fernando Fernández		
Angels of the Street	Agustín P. Delgado	Emilia Guiú, Gustavo Rojo		
Aventura en Río	Alberto Gout	Ninón Sevilla, Víctor Junco		
Caribbean	José Baviera	Armando Calvo, Anabelle Gutiérrez, José Baviera, Pedro Vargas		Co-production with Guatemala
Cradle Song	Fernando de Fuentes	María Elena Marqués, Carmelita González, Alma Delia Fuentes		
Del rancho a la televisión	Ismael Rodríguez	Luis Aguilar		
Don't Be Offended Beatrice				
Dona Mariquita of My Heart	Joaquín Pardavé	Joaquín Pardavé, Silvia Pinal, Fernando Fernández		
Dreams of Glory	Zacarías Gómez Urquiza	Miroslava, Luis Aguilar, José Baviera		
El Monstruo resucitado	Chano Urueta	Miroslava, Carlos Navarro, José María Linares-Rivas	Horror	
Four Hours Before His Death	Emilio Gómez Muriel	Carlos Navarro, Carmen Montejo		
God Created Them	Gilberto Martínez Solares	Germán Valdés, Niní Marshall, Celia Viveros		
Hotel Room	Adolfo Fernández Bustamante	Lilia Prado, Roberto Cañedo, Sara Guasch		
Huracán Ramírez	Joselito Rodríguez	David Silva, Tonina Jackson, Carmelita González		
I Am Very Macho	José Díaz Morales	Silvia Pinal	Comedy	
It Is Never Too Late to Love	Tito Davison	Libertad Lamarque, Roberto Cañedo, José Elías Moreno		
La diosa de Tahití	Juan Orol	Rosa Carmina, Arturo Martínez		
Los dineros del diablo	Alejandro Galindo	Amalia Aguilar, Roberto Cañedo		
Los que no deben nacer	Agustín P. Delgado	Gustavo Rojo, Isabela Corona, Anita Blanch, Sara García		
Love, How Bad You Are	José Díaz Morales	Emilio Tuero, Emilia Guiú, José María Linares-Rivas		
Made for Each Other	Rogelio A. González	Jorge Negrete, María Elena Marqués, Luis Aguilar		
Madness of Love	Rafael Baledón	Niní Marshall, Óscar Pulido, Yolanda Montes		
Mercy	Zacarías Gómez Urquiza	Sara García, Carmen Montejo, Anita Blanch		
My Darling Clementine	Rafael Baledón	Marga López, Joaquín Pardavé, Antonio Aguilar		
My Father Was at Fault	José Díaz Morales	Meche Barba, Antonio Aguilar, Óscar Pulido		
Neither Rich nor Poor	Fernando Cortés	Gloria Marín, Abel Salazar		
Nobody Dies Twice	Luis Spota	Abel Salazar, Luis Aguilar, Lilia del Valle		
Northern Border	Vicente Oroná	Fernando Fernández, Evangelina Elizondo, Víctor Parra		
Our Father	Emilio Gómez Muriel	Carlos López Moctezuma, Evita Muñoz, Andrea Palma		
Pain	Miguel Morayta	Lola Flores, Luis Aguilar, Antonio Badú		
Penjamo	Juan Bustillo Oro	Joaquín Pardavé, Rosario Granados, Ángel Infante		
Por el mismo camino		Sara García		
Quiéreme porque me muero	Chano Urueta	Abel Salazar, Martha Roth, Andrés Soler		
Remember to Live	Roberto Gavaldón	Libertad Lamarque, Carmen Montejo, Miguel Torruco		
Star Without Light	Ernesto Cortázar	Rosa Carmina, Fernando Fernández, Gina Cabrera		
The Bachelors	Miguel M. Delgado	Luis Aguilar, Rosita Arenas, Andrés Soler		
The Count of Monte Cristo	León Klimovsky	Jorge Mistral, Elina Colomer, Santiago Gómez Cou		
The Great Deceiver	Fernando Soler	Fernando Soler, Anita Blanch		
The Loving Women	Fernando Cortés	Amalia Aguilar, Lilia del Valle, Silvia Pinal		
The Magnificent Beast	Chano Urueta	Miroslava, Crox Alvarado, Wolf Ruvinskis, José Elías Moreno		
The Message of Death	Zacarías Gómez Urquiza	Miguel Torruco, Rebeca Iturbide, Elena Julián		
The Mystery of the Express Car	Zacarías Gómez Urquiza	Miguel Torruco, Rebeca Iturbide		
The Player	Vicente Oroná	David Silva, Carmelita González, Aurora Segura		
The Plebeian	Miguel M. Delgado	Rosita Arenas, Raúl Martínez, Chula Prieto		
The Sixth Race	Miguel M. Delgado	Rosario Granados		
The Unfaithful	Alejandro Galindo	Irasema Dilián, Armando Calvo, María Douglas		
The Vagabond	Rogelio A. González, Gilberto Martínez Solares	Germán Valdés, Leonor Llausás, Aurora Segura		
There Once Was a Husband	Fernando Méndez	Lilia Michel, Rafael Baledón, Pedro Infante		
Under the Sky of Spain	Miguel Contreras Torres	Gustavo Rojo, Marisa de Leza		
What Can Not Be Forgiven	Roberto Rodríguez	María Elena Marqués, Armando Calvo, Domingo Soler		
When You Come Back to Me	José Baviera	Ramón Armengod, Lilia del Valle, José Baviera		Co-production with Guatemala
Women Who Work	Julio Bracho	Rosita Quintana, Columba Dominguez, Alberto Carrière		
Yes, My Love	Fernando Méndez	Lilia Michel, Rafael Baledón, Pedro Infante		
Your Memory and Me	Miguel M. Delgado	Rosita Arenas, Lupe Carriles, Agustín Isunza		
