= El cuarto mandamiento (film) =

- Directed by: Rolando Aguilar
- Written by: Roberto O'Quigley; Raúl de Anda
- Produced by: Eliseo Bravo; Raúl de Anda
- Starring: Domingo Soler; Carmelita González; Sara Montes; Emma Roldán
- Cinematography: Ignacio Torres
- Edited by: Carlos Savage
- Music by: Rosalío Ramírez
- Release date: 14 August 1948
- Running time: 90 minutes
- Country: Mexico
- Language: Spanish

El cuarto mandamiento (English: The Fourth Commandment) is a 1948 Mexican drama film directed by Rolando Aguilar and starring Domingo Soler, Carmelita González, Sara Montes and Emma Roldán. The film's sets were designed by Manuel Fontanals. The film is about a family that is worried that their daughter is courted by a rich young man who likes the nightlife and luxury cars. The film is considered part of a group of family melodramas made in this period in which the dramatic tension revolves around old values, linked to a conservative order rooted in the past, which are pitted against new values associated with modernity, such as Cuando los hijos se van and A Family Like Many Others.

== Cast ==
- Domingo Soler as Don Gustavo García
- Carmelita González as Cristina
- Sara Montes as Anita
- Emma Roldán as Lupe
- Víctor Parra as David González
- Pepe del Río as Eduardo
- Azucena Rodríguez as Pita
- Manuel Noriega as Don Eusebio Echeverría
- Pepe Nava as Don Melchor
- Enrique Zambrano as Don Ricardo
- Victorio Blanco as Don Isaac Martínez
- Alfredo Varela as Sacerdote
- Elisa Christy as Empleada de oficina de tienda (uncredited)
- Conchita Gentil Arcos as María Luisa Lucio, enfermera abortista (uncredited)
- Gloria Lozano as Empleada de tienda (uncredited)

== Bibliography ==
- García Riera, Emilio. Los hermanos Soler. Universidad de Guadalajara, Centro de Investigación y Enseñanza Cinematográficas. 1990.
