= Gilberto Gazcón =

Mexican film director, screenwriter and producer (1929–2013)

Gilberto Gazcón de Anda (19 May 1929 – 11 May 2013) was a Mexican film director, screenwriter and producer. He wrote more than fifty screenplays, directed over thirty films, won numerous awards, and was a promoter of Mexican cinema. He is best known in English-speaking countries for the neo noir thriller film Rage (1966), starring Glenn Ford and Stella Stevens.

== Biography ==
Gilberto Gazcón was born in Mexico City on 19 May 1929. He was the son of film producer and screenwriter Valentín Gazcón, and the nephew of Raúl de Anda, pioneers of Mexican sound cinema. His brother, Edgardo Gazcón, also became a filmmaker.

He showed an aptitude for art from a young age and developed an interest in cinema, where he began as a child actor and later worked as an assistant set designer.

He began writing his own screenplays, and decided to leave his medical career, and enrolled in film adaptation courses and studied acting at the Cinematographic Academy, directed by Celestino Gorostiza. The first film to be released with a plot written by him was Fierecilla (1950), directed by Fernando Méndez, which received favourable reviews for its plot and the psychology of its characters.

In 1958, he directed his first film, The Boxer (El boxeador). In 1960, he directed La cárcel de Cananea, which gained international attention and was featured at the San Sebastián International Film Festival. In 1966, he directed a Mexican-American co-production Rage (El mal), starring Glenn Ford and Stella Stevens.

He directed more than 30 films, including Los desarraigados (1959), La risa de la ciudad (1962), Perro callejero (1980), and Perro callejero II (1981).

In 1963, he became a founding member of the Mexican Society of Film, Radio and Television Directors and Producers (Sociedad Mexicana de Directores y Realizadores de Cine, Radio y Televisión) and was appointed honorary president from 1982.

He died on 11 May 2013 at the age of 83, due to pulmonary complications caused by an embolism.

Juan Antonio de la Riva, film director and head of the Mexican Academy of Cinematographic Arts and Sciences, described him as "a great man, who in his career as a writer and director always strove to be ambitious, always pursued quality cinema, which was demonstrated in most of his films".

== Awards ==
- Cabeza de Palenque award (two times)
- Karlovy Vary International Film Festival Golden Globe
- Hollywood Foreign Press Association
- Ariel Award (two times)
- Diosas de Plata (Silver Goddess) (five times)
- Gold Medal of Merit for Director

== Selected filmography ==
=== As director ===
- The Boxer (El boxeador (1958)
- Los desarraigados (1959)
- El gran pillo (1960)
- La cárcel de Cananea (1960)
- Remolino (1961)
- Suerte te dé Dios (1961)
- Tres tristes tigres (1961)
- Juan sin miedo (1961)
- Cielo rojo (1962)
- Atrás de las nubes (1962)
- La risa de la ciudad (1963)
- Rage (El mal) (1966)
- Al rojo vivo (1969)
- Tres amigos (1970)
- El cinico (1970)
- Ya somos hombres (1971)
- Los novios (1971)
- El cielo y tu (1971)
- El desconocido (1974)
- El niño y la estrella (1976)
- Traigo la sangre caliente (1977)
- El regreso de los perros callejeros (1978)
- Perro callejero (1980)
- Perro callejero II (1981)
- Dos de abajo (1983)
- El Cafre (1986)
- Rosa de dos aromas (1989)
- Félix, como el gato (1995)
- Push to Open (1998)

=== As screenwriter ===
- The Shrew (1951), dir. Fernando Méndez
- The Lone Wolf (1952), dir. Vicente Oroná
- The Justice of the Wolf (1952), dir. Vicente Oroná
- The Wolf Returns (1952), dir. Vicente Oroná
- The Minister's Daughter (1952), dir. Fernando Méndez
- The Spot of the Family (1953), dir. Fernando Méndez
- Genius and Figure (1953), dir. Fernando Méndez
- El jinete (1954), dir. Vicente Oroná
- Con el diablo en el cuerpo (1954), dir. Raúl de Anda
- Los aventureros (1954), dir. Fernando Méndez
- Fugitivos: Pueblo de proscritos (1955), dir. Fernando Méndez
- ¡Vaya tipos! (1955), dir. Fernando Méndez
- Tres bribones (1955), dir. Fernando Méndez
- Ay, Chaparros... ¡Cómo abundan! (1956), dir. Rolando Aguilar
- Quietos todos (1959), dir. Zacarías Gómez Urquiza
- Señoritas (1959), dir. Fernando Méndez
- Los desarraigados (1960)
- La cárcel de Cananea (1960)
- Tres tristes tigres (1961)
- Juan sin miedo (1961)
- Atrás de las nubes (1962)
- La risa de la ciudad (1963)
- En la vieja California (1963), dir. Jesús Marín
- Los bravos de California (1963), dir. Jesús Marín
- Gallo con espolones (1964), dir. Zacarías Gómez Urquiza
- Rage (1966)
- Al rojo vivo (1969)
- Tres amigos (1970)
- * El cinico (1970)
- Ya somos hombres (1971)
- Los novios (1971)
- El cielo y tu (1971)
- El desconocido (1974)
- El niño y la estrella (1976)
- Félix, como el gato (1995)
- Push to Open (1998)

=== As producer ===
- Rage (1966)
- El niño y la estrella (1976)
- Relaciones violentas (1992), dir Sergio Véjar
- Los peluqueros (1997), dir. Javier Durán

=== As editor ===
- Félix, como el gato (1955)
