= La intrusa (1954 film) =

- Directed by: Miguel Morayta
- Written by: Caridad Bravo Adams (radioplay "La Intrusa"); Paulino Masip
- Produced by: Fernando de Fuentes
- Starring: Rosario Granados; Eduardo Fajardo; Evangelina Elizondo
- Release date: 22 July 1954 (Mexico)
- Country: Mexico
- Language: Spanish

La intrusa ("The Intruder") is a 1954 Mexican film. It was directed by Miguel Morayta, produced by Fernando de Fuentes, and starring Rosario Granados, Eduardo Fajardo and Evangelina Elizondo.

== Plot ==
A young woman, Gabriela (Rosario Granados) goes to a farm and one of the owners, Raúl (Eduardo Fajardo) falls in love with her. However, a jealous woman, Tania (Evangelina Elizondo) tries to eliminate her.

== Cast ==
- Rosario Granados - Gabriela Almeida
- Eduardo Fajardo - Raúl Gómez de Fonseca
- Evangelina Elizondo - Tania
- Luis Beristáin - Francisco Salvatierra
- Carlos Martínez Baena - Don Pedro
- Miguel Ángel Ferriz - Doctor Suárez
- Enrique García Álvarez - Tío Juan
- Matilde Palou - Tía Rita
- María Herrero - Margarita Salvatierra
- Salvador Quiroz - Doctor
- Rosa Elena Durgel - Rosaura
- Lupe Suárez - Valeria
- Rodolfo Landa
