= El Siete Machos =

1951 film

- Directed by: Miguel M. Delgado
- Written by: Janet Alcoriza; Luis Alcoriza; Jaime Salvador (adaptation); Miguel M. Delgado (technical screenplay)
- Produced by: Santiago Reachi
- Starring: Mario Moreno «Cantinflas» Alma Rosa Aguirre; Delia Magaña
- Cinematography: Gabriel Figueroa
- Edited by: Emilio Gómez Muriel
- Music by: Rafael Hernández
- Production company: Posa Films
- Distributed by: Columbia Pictures
- Release date: 2 May 1951
- Running time: 108 minutes
- Country: Mexico
- Language: Spanish

El Siete Machos (aka The Seven Macho Men) is a 1951 Mexican comedy Western film directed by Miguel M. Delgado, and starring Mario Moreno «Cantinflas», Alma Rosa Aguirre and Delia Magaña.

== Plot ==
After the tragic death of her father, who had been ambushed and killed years ago, Rosario returns to the ranch that had belonged to him. Rosario arrives with the desire to meet "El Siete Machos" ("The Seven Macho Men"), an outlaw who in the style of Robin Hood distributes the loot of his robberies among the poor, called like that because "he possesses the courage of seven macho men". Along the way, Rosario meets Margarito, a naive but rogueish ranch hand who looks identical to El Siete Machos.

== Cast ==
- Mario Moreno «Cantinflas» as Margarito / El Siete Machos
- Alma Rosa Aguirre as Rosario
- Miguel Ángel Ferriz as Don Carmelo
- Miguel Inclán as Toño
- Delia Magaña as Chole
- Carlos Martínez Baena as Padre Guzmán (as Carlos M. Baena)
- Rafael Icardo as Don Ceferino
- José Elías Moreno as El Chacal
- Antonio R. Frausto as Jefe municipal
- Enriqueta Reza as Yerbera
- Ernesto Finance as Miembro de la banda del Siete Machos
- Carlos Múzquiz as Manuel
- Ángel Infante as Don Guadalupe
- Víctor Alcocer (uncredited)
- José Chávez (uncredited)
- Edmundo Espino como Maestro (uncredited)
- José Luis Fernández as Miembro de la banda (uncredited)
- Jesús García as Peón (uncredited)
- Leonor Gómez as Cocinera (uncredited)
- Cecilia Leger as Invitada a fiesta (uncredited)
- Kika Meyer as Mujer en cantina (uncredited)
- José Muñoz as Florentino (uncredited)
- José Pardavé as Peón (uncredited)
- Aurora Ruiz as Felisa (uncredited)
