= Cock o' the Walk =

Cock o' the Walk can refer to:

- Cock o' the Walk (1930 film), an American film
- Cock o' the Walk (1935 film), an American film
- Cock o' the Walk (1953 film), a Mexican film

== See also ==
- Cock-of-the-rock, a type of bird native to South America
