= The White Renegade =

1960 film

- Directed by: Fernando Méndez
- Written by: Abel Salazar
- Produced by: Abel Salazar
- Starring: Mauricio Garcés; Abel Salazar; Rafael Baledón
- Cinematography: Raúl Martínez Solares
- Edited by: Alfredo Rosas Priego
- Music by: Gustavo César Carrión
- Production company: Cinematográfica ABSA
- Distributed by: Alameda Films
- Release date: 16 June 1960
- Running time: 75 minutes
- Country: Mexico
- Language: Spanish

The White Renegade (Spanish: El renegado blanco) is a 1960 Mexican adventure film directed by Fernando Méndez and starring Mauricio Garcés, Abel Salazar and Rafael Baledón.

== Cast ==
- Mauricio Garcés as Juan
- Abel Salazar as Julio
- Rafael Baledón as José
- Martha Roth
- Luis Aragón
- Renée Dumas
- Begoña Palacios
- Carlos Nieto
- Guillermo Rivas
- Eduardo Alcaraz
- David Reynoso
- Virma González
- Ángel Di Stefani
- José Dupeyrón
- Tito Novaro
- Salvador Terroba
- Antonio Badú
- Fernando Galiana
- Emilio Garibay
- Carlos Robles Gil

== Bibliography ==
- Emilio García Riera. Historia documental del cine mexicano: 1959-1960. Universidad de Guadalajara, 1994.
