= Del rancho a la capital =

1942 film by Raúl de Anda

- Directed by: Raúl de Anda
- Written by: Domingo Soler; Raúl de Anda
- Produced by: Raúl de Anda
- Cinematography: Raúl Martínez Solares
- Music by: Felipe Bermejo
- Production company: Producciones Raúl de Anda
- Release date: 1942
- Country: Mexico
- Language: Español

Del rancho a la capital is a 1942 Mexican adventure comedy film directed by Raúl de Anda under his Producciones Raúl de Anda banner. It stars Domingo Soler, Susana Guízar, and Pedro Armendáriz.

== Cast ==
- Domingo Soler as Domingo Rodríguez
- Susana Guízar as María de la Fuente
- Pedro Armendáriz as Pedro Rodríguez
- Carlos López Moctezuma as Carlos Arteaga y Campobello
- Margarita Cortés as Angélica de la Fuente
- Manolo Fábregas as Julián de la Fuente (as Manuel Fábregas)
- Armando Soto La Marina como Chicote
- Victoria Argota as Victoria de la Fuente
- Fanny Schiller como Doña Consuelo de Rodríguez
- Víctor Velázquez as Víctor
- Josefina Romagnoli as Chata, amiga de María
- Paco Martínez as Don Manuel
- Carolina Barret as Cuquita (uncredited)
- Roberto Cañedo as Young man in dance (uncredited)
- Conchita Gentil Arcos as Doña Mercedes (uncredited)
- Max Langler as Don Rigoberto (uncredited)
- Leonor de Martorel as Wife of don Rigoberto (uncredited)
- José L. Murillo as Party guest (uncredited)
- José Ignacio Rocha as Party guest (uncredited)
