= The Minister's Daughter =

The Minister's Daughter may refer to:

- The Minister's Daughter (1952 film), a Mexican romantic comedy film
- The Minister's Daughter (1943 film), an Argentine comedy film
