= There Once Was a Husband =

1953 film by Fernando Méndez

- Directed by: Fernando Méndez
- Written by: Rafael Baledón; Ramón Obón
- Produced by: Rafael Baledón; Gregorio Walerstein
- Starring: Lilia Michel; Rafael Baledón; Pedro Infante
- Cinematography: Carl Carvahal
- Edited by: Juan José Marino
- Music by: Rosalío Ramírez; Federico Ruiz
- Production company: Cinematográfica Filmex
- Distributed by: Clasa-Mohme
- Release date: 5 March 1953
- Running time: 97 minutes
- Country: Mexico
- Language: Spanish

There Once Was a Husband (Spanish: Había una vez un marido) is a 1953 Mexican musical comedy film directed by Fernando Méndez and starring Lilia Michel, Rafael Baledón and Pedro Infante. it was shot at the Churubusco Studios in Mexico City. The film's sets were designed by the art director Jorge Fernández.

== Cast ==
- Lilia Michel as Lilia
- Rafael Baledón as Rafael
- Pedro Infante as Pedro Infante
- María Victoria as Nelly
- Yolanda Montes as Tongolele
- Pedro Vargas as Pedro Vargas
- Antonio Aguilar as Tony Aguilar
- Juan Legido as Cantante
- Carlota Solares as Alegria
- José Pulido as Antonio
- Gloria Aguiar
- Pedro de Aguillón as Betin
- Alfonso Iglesias Padre as Médico forense
- Omar Jasso as Policía
- Jorge Treviño as Baby Tonina
- Juan Orraca as Detective de policía
- Guillermo Cramer as Mesero
- Velia Vegar as Vecina
- Consuelo Monteagudo as Esposa de Baby Tonina
- José Pardavé as Detective
- Eulalio González
- Héctor Mateos as Mesero
- Humberto Rodríguez
- Mariachi Vargas
- Aurora Segura as Clienta del doctor
- Armando Acosta as Cantinero
- Rafael Banquells as Anunciador
- Cecilia Leger as Cliente en tienda
- Luis Manuel Pelayo as Claveles

== Bibliography ==
- María Luisa Amador. Cartelera cinematográfica, 1950-1959. UNAM, 1985.
