= Acapulco (film) =

1952 film by Emilio Fernández

- Directed by: Emilio Fernández
- Written by: Íñigo de Martino; Emilio Fernández Inda
- Produced by: Raúl de Anda
- Starring: Elsa Aguirre; Armando Calvo; Miguel Torruco
- Cinematography: Jack Draper
- Edited by: Carlos Savage
- Music by: Antonio Díaz Conde
- Production company: Cinematografica Internacional
- Release date: 18 January 1952
- Running time: 90 minutes
- Country: Mexico
- Language: Spanish

Acapulco is a 1952 Mexican romantic comedy film directed by Emilio Fernández and starring Elsa Aguirre, Armando Calvo and Miguel Torruco.

== Cast ==
- Elsa Aguirre as Diana Lozano
- Armando Calvo as Ricardo Serrano
- Miguel Torruco as Alberto
- Óscar Pulido as Don Julio, gerente hotel
- José María Linares-Rivas as Don Delfín
- Rodolfo Acosta as Alfredo
- Maruja Grifell as Enriqueta
- Mimí Derba as Abuela de Ricardo
- Luis Arcaraz
- Manuel Calvo
- Eva Garza as Cantante
- Antonio Haro Oliva
- Carlos Riquelme as Alonso, mesero

== Bibliography ==
- Mora, Carl J. Mexican Cinema: Reflections of a Society, 1896-2004. McFarland, 2005.
