= Porfirio Díaz (film) =

- Directed by: Rafael M. Saavedra; Raphael J. Sevilla
- Written by: Rafael M. Saavedra
- Produced by: Uribe Montes de Oca
- Cinematography: Ezequiel Carrasco
- Edited by: Alfredo Rosas Priego
- Music by: Francisco Domínguez
- Release date: 15 September 1944
- Running time: 101 minutes
- Country: Mexico
- Language: Spanish

Porfirio Díaz is a 1944 Mexican historical film directed by Rafael M. Saavedra and Raphael J. Sevilla. The former also wrote the script. The film portrays the life of the nineteenth-century Mexican general and president Porfirio Díaz.

== Cast ==
- Emilio Brillas
- Asunción Casal
- Fernando Curiel
- Mimí Derba
- Tony Díaz
- Gloria Estrada
- Conchita Gentil Arcos
- José Goula
- Rafael Icardo
- Miguel Inclán
- José Luis Jiménez
- Max Langler
- Chel López
- José Elías Moreno
- Manuel Noriega
- Alicia de Phillips
- Salvador Quiroz
- Humberto Rodríguez
- Virginia Serret
- David Silva
- Arturo Soto Rangel
- Dolores Tinoco
- David Valle González
- Aurora Zermeño

== Bibliography ==
- Turner, Frederick. The Dynamic of Mexican Nationalism. University of North Carolina Press, 1968.
