= Yes, My Love =

1953 film

- Directed by: Fernando Méndez
- Written by: Rafael Baledón; Ramón Obón
- Produced by: Rafael Baledón; Rafael Banquells; Pancho Córdova; Gregorio Walerstein
- Starring: Lilia Michel; Rafael Baledón; Pedro Infante
- Cinematography: Carl Carvahal
- Edited by: Juan José Marino
- Music by: Rosalío Ramírez; Federico Ruiz
- Production company: Cinematográfica Filmex
- Release date: 14 May 1953
- Running time: 90 minutes
- Country: Mexico
- Language: Spanish

Yes, My Love (Spanish: Sí, mi vida) is a 1953 Mexican musical comedy film directed by Fernando Méndez and starring Lilia Michel, Rafael Baledón and Pedro Infante.

== Cast ==
- Lilia Michel as Lilia
- Rafael Baledón as Rafael
- Pedro Infante as Cameo
- María Victoria as Cantante
- Pedro Vargas as Cantante
- Mario Rey as Cantante
- Los Churumbeles de España as Cantantes
- Carlota Solares as Alegria
- Carlos Martínez Baena as Doctor Amado Castellanos
- Carlos Riquelme as Jaime
- Rafael Banquells as Valentín Chagoya
- Ernesto Finance as Jefe Demetrius
- Sergio Virel as Joven pretendiente de Lilia
- Lupe del Castillo as Señorita directora
- Héctor Mateos as Dr. Zavala
- Guillermo Cramer as Esbirro de Demetrius
- Omar Jasso as Mensajero
- Chel López as Esbirro de Demetrius
- Agustín Fernández as Esbirro de Demetrius
- Concepción Martínez as Profesora
- Magdalena G. de Banquells as Profesora
- Alberto 'Chivo' Córdoba
- Eduardo 'Pocho' Herrera
- Omar Cárdona
- Silvia Pinal as Leticia
- Armando Acosta as Hombre en restaurante
- Pancho Córdova as Locutor
- Julio Daneri as Cobrador
- Eulalio González
- Alfonso Iglesias Padre as Miembro facultad
- Consuelo Monteagudo as Mujer cegata
- Yolanda Montes as Bailarina
- José Pardavé as Profesor Hércules
- Ignacio Peón as Licenciado

== Bibliography ==
- David E. Wilt. Stereotyped Images of United States Citizens in Mexican Cinema, 1930-1990. University of Maryland at College Park, 1991.
