= Rosalinda (film) =

- Directed by: Rolando Aguilar
- Written by: Carlos Gaytán; Rolando Aguilar
- Produced by: Raúl de Anda
- Starring: María Antonieta Pons; Rafael Baledón; Tito Junco
- Cinematography: Jesús Hernández
- Edited by: Carlos Savage
- Music by: Rosalío Ramírez
- Production company: Producciones Raúl de Anda
- Release date: 25 December 1945
- Running time: 100 minutes
- Country: Mexico
- Language: Spanish

Rosalinda is a 1945 Mexican historical drama film directed and co-written by Rolando Aguilar and starring María Antonieta Pons, Rafael Baledón and Tito Junco.

== Cast ==
- María Antonieta Pons as Rosalinda
- Rafael Baledón as Armando
- Tito Junco as Gumaro
- Agustín Isunza as Simón
- Meche Barba as Luisa
- Miguel Ángel Ferriz as Don Chon
- Luis G. Barreiro as Guardafaro
- Guillermo Calles as Juan
- Alfonso Bedoya as Cecina
- Jorge Arriaga
- Gilberto González
- Max Langler
- Stephen Berne as Hombre en cantina
- José Chávez as Pueblerino
- Roberto Corell as El Peruano
- Chel López as Capitán
- José Pardavé
- José Ignacio Rocha as Pueblerino

== Bibliography ==
- Rogelio Agrasánchez. Guillermo Calles: A Biography of the Actor and Mexican Cinema Pioneer. McFarland, 2010.
