= Rage (1966 film) =

1966 film by Gilberto Gazcón

- Directed by: Gilberto Gazcón
- Screenplay by: Teddi Sherman; Gilberto Gazcón; Fernando Méndez
- Story by: Jesús Velásquez
- Produced by: Gilberto Gazcón
- Starring: Glenn Ford; Stella Stevens; David Reynoso
- Cinematography: Rosalío Solamo
- Edited by: Carlos Savage; Walter Thompson
- Music by: Gustavo César Carrión
- Color process: Pathécolor
- Production companies: Cinematográfica Jalisco S.A. Joseph M. Schenck Enterprises
- Distributed by: Columbia Pictures
- Release date: November 30, 1966
- Running time: 103 minutes
- Countries: Mexico; United States
- Language: English

Rage (Spanish title : El Mal) is a 1966 Mexican-American drama neo noir thriller film and co-written and directed by Gilberto Gazcón and starring Glenn Ford and Stella Stevens in the last of their three films together and David Reynoso. The opening credits indicate the title of the film is 48 Ore Per Non Morire, which translated from Italian to English is "48 Hours Not To Die." Filming took place in Sierra de Órganos National Park in the town of Sombrerete, Mexico.

== Plot ==
Dr. Reuben lives alone with his dog at the medical clinic in a small Mexican town. An alcoholic, he blames himself for the death of his wife and baby in childbirth. He refuses to treat Maria, who is pregnant and likely to need a Caesarean section. Maria's husband, Pancho, works for a nearby construction crew. Pancho's co-worker Fortunato complains that his cat has been acting unusually. The cat bites Reuben's dog, and the dog later bites Reuben.

A supply truck brings a group of women into town as "entertainment" for the workers. One of them, Perla, is attracted to Reuben, but he shows no interest. The next morning the women leave town, but Reuben finds Perla asleep on his examination table. It will be ten days before Perla can leave on the next supply truck.

Fortunato is brought into town by his fellow workers to see Reuben. He is delirious, restrained with ropes and foaming at the mouth. Reuben concludes the man has rabies and cannot be cured. Fortunato dies that evening.

Ten days later, Perla plans to leave, but makes one last effort to befriend Reuben. He rebuffs her again, explaining that he blames himself, not her, for his sour attitude.

Pancho arrives in a horse-drawn cart and tells Reuben that Maria is having contractions. Reuben follows Pancho in his Jeep. On the way, Reuben's dog rabidly attacks Pancho's horse. Reuben shoots the dog and realizes he himself must be infected. Counting the days back to the dog's bite, he realizes he has only 48 hours to be treated before it is too late. Pancho grabs Reuben's gun and threatens to shoot him if he does not first attend to his wife, but Reuben drives off.

Haunted by the memory and guilt of his pregnant wife's death, Reuben reverses course and successfully delivers Pancho and Maria's child, but he now has only 36 hours left. Pancho volunteers to escort Reuben to the hospital in Buenavista. The construction workers learn of Reuben's predicament and phone ahead for an ambulance to intercept them. The pair encounter various problems along the way including the collapse of a narrow bridge, an overheated radiator, and running low on gas. They find some gasoline at a roadside station where they see Perla, who joins them, over Reuben's objections. The Jeep runs out of gas and the three set out on foot toward a shortcut over the mountains and through the desert leading to the highway.

By nightfall, the ambulance locates the abandoned Jeep. Reuben, Perla and Pancho camp for the night. Reuben almost kisses Perla, but pushes her away, mindful that he is contagious. Perla chides Reuben for blaming himself for the death of his wife and child. She tells him it was just their time to die, and he should think about living. The next day, they cross the rugged, hot desert before finding a pond with a waterfall. Reuben appears to be sensitive to light and sound, symptoms of rabies; however, when he stoops to drink the water, Perla and Pancho infer that he has not yet developed rabies, which also includes fear of water.

The three make it to the highway, where they hijack a school bus at gunpoint. Pancho reveals Reuben's condition to the driver and the children. Perla tells Reuben he will be cured, but she will not be cured of him. Reuben tells Perla she opened his eyes the night before about life; and, she should open hers too by making something of herself. The children taunt Reuben and the driver runs the bus off the road and orders the children out. The driver agrees to take the three to Buenavista and return for the children, but the bus breaks down after travelling only a few yards.

The children help push the bus up an incline, after which it is able to coast almost all the way into the city. With the town in sight, the three run the rest of the way. Reuben smiles as he anticipates his survival.

== Cast ==
- Glenn Ford as Doctor Reuben
- Stella Stevens as Perla
- David Reynoso as Pancho
- Armando Silvestre as Antonio
- Ariadne Welter as Blanca (as Ariadna Welter)
- Dacia Gonzalez as Maria
- Pancho Córdova as old man
- Maura Monti as Violetta
- David Silva as bus driver
- Quintin Bulnes as Pedro
- Isela Vega as herself 1st
- Jorge Russek as himself 2nd
- Raúl Martinez as himself 3rd
- José Ángel Espinosa 'Ferrusquilla' as himself 4th
- Gilda Mirós as himself 5th
- Stim Segar as himself 6th
- Alicia Gutiérrez as himself 7th
- Aurora Clavel as herself 8th
- Rosa María Gallardo as herself 9th
- Anita Morgan as himself 10th
- Susana Cabrera as wife of old man
- Valentín Trujillo as José, truck driver's assistant
- José Elías Moreno as Fortunato

== Reception ==
Bruce LaBruce considers the film "an unfairly forgotten masterpiece of low-budget exploitation cinema."

== See also ==
- List of American films of 1966
