= The Shrew =

1951 film

- Directed by: Fernando Méndez
- Written by: Gilberto Gazcón; Gabriel Ramírez Osante
- Produced by: Valentín Gazcón
- Starring: Rosita Arenas; Domingo Soler; Carlos López Moctezuma
- Cinematography: Manuel Gómez Urquiza
- Edited by: Carlos Savage
- Music by: Jorge Pérez
- Production company: Cinematográfica Intercontinental
- Distributed by: Clasa-Mohme
- Release date: 3 May 1951
- Running time: 83 minutes
- Country: Mexico
- Language: Spanish

The Shrew (Spanish: Fierecilla) is a 1951 Mexican comedy film directed by Fernando Méndez and starring Rosita Arenas, Domingo Soler and Carlos López Moctezuma. The plot was inspired by Shakespeare's The Taming of the Shrew. It was shot at the Churubusco Studios in Mexico City. The film's sets were designed by the art director Jorge Fernández.

== Cast ==
- Rosita Arenas as Rosita Hernández
- Domingo Soler as Don Tomás, padrino
- Carlos López Moctezuma as Carlos
- Eduardo Noriega as Rafael Álvarez
- Arturo Martínez as Antonio
- Bertha Lomelí as Lolita
- Eduardo Arozamena as Sacerdote
- Maruja Grifell as Doña Brigida
- Angélica María as Rosita niña
- María Gentil Arcos as Dueña tienda ropa
- Pepe Nava as Cantinero
- Emilio Garibay as Eusebio, patrón

== Bibliography ==
- Alfaro, Eduardo de la Vega. Fernando Méndez, 1908-1966. Universidad de Guadalajara, 1995.
- Amador, María Luisa. Cartelera cinematográfica, 1950-1959. UNAM, 1985.
- Paranaguá, Paulo Antonio. Mexican Cinema. British Film Institute, 1995.
- Vitali, Valentina. Capital and Popular Cinema: The Dollars are Coming!. Manchester University Press, 2016.
