= My Goddaughter's Difficulties =

1951 film

- Directed by: Fernando Méndez
- Written by: Fernando Méndez; Raúl de Anda
- Produced by: Raúl de Anda
- Starring: Rafael Baledón; Carmelita González; Domingo Soler
- Cinematography: Ignacio Torres
- Edited by: Carlos Savage
- Music by: Gustavo César Carrión
- Production company: Cinematográfica Intercontinental
- Distributed by: Cinematográfica Intercontinental
- Release date: 12 April 1951
- Running time: 85 minutes
- Country: Mexico
- Language: Spanish

My Goddaughter's Difficulties (Spanish: Los apuros de mi ahijada) is a 1951 Mexican comedy drama film directed by Fernando Méndez and starring Rafael Baledón, Carmelita González and Domingo Soler. The film's sets were designed by the art director Jorge Fernández.

== Cast ==
- Rafael Baledón as Luis Hernández
- Carmelita González as Carmela
- Domingo Soler as Don Laureano Soto
- Blanca de Castejón as Doña Carmen Martínez
- Dalia Íñiguez as Clavelitos
- Delia Magaña as Chabela, criada
- Federico Curiel as Robertito
- Gloria de Córdoba as Oralia
- Manuel Noriega as Federico Ferrotti
- Salvador Quiroz as Médico
- José Luis Menéndez as Perico
- Lily Aclemar as Doña María
- Juan José Hurtado as Arnoldo
- Gloria Alonso as Gloria
- Salvador Lozano as Pepe, actor
- Angélica Rey as Linda, actriz

== Bibliography ==
- Alfaro, Eduardo de la Vega. Fernando Méndez, 1908-1966. Universidad de Guadalajara, 1995.
- Paranaguá, Paulo Antonio. Mexican Cinema. British Film Institute, 1995.
- Riera, Emilio García . Historia documental del cine mexicano: 1952. Ediciones Era, 1969.
- Vitali, Valentina. Capital and Popular Cinema: The Dollars are Coming!. Manchester University Press, 2016.
