= De carne somos =

1955 Mexican film

- Directed by: Roberto Gavaldón
- Written by: Eduardo Borrás; Roberto Gavaldón; Julio Alejandro
- Starring: Marga López; Carlos Rivas; José Elías Moreno; Lucy Gallardo; Sara Guasch
- Cinematography: Jack Draper
- Production company: Cinematográfica Filmex S.A.
- Release date: October 5, 1955
- Country: Mexico
- Language: Spanish

De carne somos is a 1955 Mexican film directed by Roberto Gavaldón and starring Marga López, Carlos Rivas and José Elías Moreno.

The film is based on the play La lampara encendida by Eduardo Borrás, who also co-wrote the screenplay with Gavaldón and Julio Alejandro.

It is one of the last film appearances of actor José María Linares-Rivas, who died the same year it was released.

== Cast ==
- Marga López - Linda
- Carlos Rivas - Mario Vidal
- José Elías Moreno - Doroteo
- Lucy Gallardo - Alicia Zurena
- Sara Guasch - Elvira
- Héctor Godoy - Archibaldo Alvarado
- Juan Orraca - Señor Zurena
- Ángel Merino - Doctor
- Julián de Meriche - (as Julien de Meriche)
- José María Linares-Rivas - Ramón
- Amanda del Llano - Susana
- Lola Beltrán - Vocalist
