= The Queen of the Tropics =

1946 film

- Directed by: Raúl de Anda
- Written by: Raúl de Anda
- Produced by: Raúl de Anda; Carlos Gaytán
- Starring: María Antonieta Pons; Luis Aguilar; Fernando Soto "Mantequilla"
- Cinematography: Domingo Carrillo
- Edited by: Carlos Savage
- Music by: Rosalío Ramírez
- Production company: Producciones Raúl de Anda
- Release date: 25 October 1946
- Running time: 100 minutes
- Country: Mexico
- Language: Spanish

The Queen of the Tropics (Spanish: La reina del trópico) is a 1946 Mexican musical drama film directed by Raúl de Anda and starring María Antonieta Pons, Luis Aguilar and Fernando Soto "Mantequilla". It is in the tradition of Rumberas films. It was shot at the Azteca Studios in Mexico City. The film's sets were designed by the art director José Rodríguez Granada.

== Plot ==
In Papantla, Veracruz, the orphan girl Maria Antonia (María Antonieta Pons) lives with Don Anselmo (Arturo Soto Rangel), a peasant producer of vanilla and his wife Trini (Maria Gentil Arcos), who adopted her when she was very young. The lawyer Esteban (Carlos López Moctezuma), son of Don Anselmo, arrives from Mexico City and at the feast of Corpus Christi he is dazzled by the beauty of María Antonia. The villain intoxicates the girl in order to possess her. He returns to Mexico City and he promises María Antonia that he will return for her when he has triumphed. With Don Anselmo seriously ill, María Antonia travels to Mexico City to tell Esteban, who does not want to receive her in his luxury apartment. Maria Antonia is alone and at the mercy of the dangers of the city, until she meets the young Andres (Luis Aguilar) and his friend Pizarrín (Fernando Soto "Mantequilla"), who give her asylum in their neighborhood.

== Cast ==
- María Antonieta Pons as María Antonia
- Luis Aguilar as Andrés
- Carlos López Moctezuma as Esteban
- Fernando Soto "Mantequilla" as Pizarrín
- Arturo Soto Rangel as Don Anselmo
- María Gentil Arcos as Doña Trini
- Emma Roldán as Doña Gumersinda
- Salvador Quiroz as Don Pedro
- Luis G. Barreiro as El gerente
- Enrique Pastor as Músico
- Charles Rooner as Mr. Jackson
- Ramón G. Larrea as El editor
- Raquel Téllez Girón as La amiga
- Roberto Corell as Juan
- Jorge Arriaga as El tarzán
- Max Langler as El ladrón
- Hernán Vera as El hotelero
- Kiko Mendive as Músico miembro de la orquesta

== Reviews ==
When one says that Maria Antonieta Pons is the Queen of the Tropics, it is true, because it is the name of a movie that she starred surrounded by great actors. To justify her Cuban accent, in the film was assigned to her a role of an orphan whose origin was unknown and was adopted by a peasant couple; the plot happening in Papantla, Veracruz. Even when she tried to be demure, she don't kept to hearing the call of the music, and to the minimum provocation, she moves with the rhythm of the music in the company of another Cuban dancer highlighted in the Mexican cinema: Kiko Mendive, who prepared several choreographies executed by this rumbera star.

== Bibliography ==
- Gunckel, Colin, Horak, Jan-Christopher & Jarvinen, Lisa. Cinema Between Latin America and Los Angeles: Origins to 1960. Rutgers University Press, 2019.
