= The Hour of Truth =

1945 film

- Directed by: Norman Foster
- Written by: Janet Alcoriza; José Luis de Celis; Norman Foster
- Starring: Ricardo Montalbán; Virginia Serret; Lilia Michel
- Cinematography: Ignacio Torres
- Edited by: Rafael Portillo
- Music by: Gonzalo Curiel; Manuel Esperón
- Production company: Producciones México
- Release date: 15 November 1945
- Running time: 99 minutes
- Country: Mexico
- Language: Spanish

The Hour of Truth (Spanish: La hora de la verdad) is a 1945 Mexican drama film directed by Norman Foster and starring Ricardo Montalbán, Virginia Serret, Lilia Michel. It is set in the world of bullfighting.

== Cast ==
- Ricardo Montalbán as Rafael Meija
- Virginia Serret as Carmela
- Lilia Michel as Elena
- Roberto Cañedo
- Mimí Derba
- Miguel Ángel Ferriz
- Antonio R. Frausto
- Miguel Inclán
- Carlos Martínez Baena
- Carlos Orellana
- Daniel Pastor
- Fernando A. Rivero
- Emma Roldán
- Virginia Zurí

== Bibliography ==
- Mora, Carl J. Mexican Cinema: Reflections of a Society. University of California Press, 1989.
