= The Game Rooster =

1948 film

- Directed by: Alberto Gout
- Written by: Carlos Gaytán; Valentín Gazcón de Anda; Alberto Gout; Raúl de Anda
- Produced by: Raúl de Anda
- Starring: Luis Aguilar; Carmelita González; Joan Page
- Cinematography: Alex Phillips
- Edited by: Carlos Savage
- Music by: Rosalío Ramírez
- Release date: 19 August 1948
- Running time: 97 minutes
- Country: Mexico
- Language: Spanish

The Game Rooster (Spanish: El gallo giro) is a 1948 Mexican comedy drama film directed by Alberto Gout and starring Luis Aguilar, Carmelita González and Joan Page. The film's sets were designed by the art director Manuel Fontanals.

== Cast ==
- Luis Aguilar as Juan Gutiérrez
- Carmelita González as Elia del Rincón
- Joan Page as Janette
- Pepe del Río as Armando
- Enrique King as Reintegro
- Josefina Escobedo as Doña Magdalena
- Óscar Pulido as Don Rafael
- Aurora Cortés as Madre de Juan
- Aurora Walker as Matilde
- Maruja Grifell as Doña Soledad
- Gloria Ríos as Chabelita, enfermera
- Eduardo Vivas as Don Matías

== Bibliography ==
- Alfaro, Eduardo de la Vega. Alberto Gout (1907-1966). Cineteca Nacional, 1988.
- Chávez, Alex E. Sounds of Crossing: Music, Migration, and the Aural Poetics of Huapango Arribeño. Duke University Press, 2017.
- Gilabert, Rosa Peralt. Manuel Fontanals, escenógrafo: teatro, cine y exilio. Editorial Fundamentos, 2007.
