= With Villa's Veterans =

1939 film

- Directed by: Raúl de Anda
- Written by: Raúl de Anda
- Produced by: Raúl de Anda
- Starring: Domingo Soler; Pedro Armendáriz; Emilio Fernández
- Cinematography: Raúl Martínez Solares
- Edited by: Raúl de Anda
- Production company: Producciones Raúl de Anda
- Distributed by: Cinexport Distributing
- Release date: 19 November 1939
- Running time: 95 minutes
- Country: Mexico
- Language: Spanish

With Villa's Veterans (Spanish: Con los Dorados de Villa) is a 1939 Mexican war drama film directed by Raúl de Anda and starring Domingo Soler, Pedro Armendáriz and Emilio Fernández. The film's sets were designed by the art director Mariano Rodríguez Granada. It takes place during the Mexican Revolution.

== Cast ==
- Domingo Soler as Coronel Domingo
- Pedro Armendáriz as Mayor Pedro Mondragón
- Emilio Fernández as Mayor El Indio Fernández
- Susana Cora as Rosa Navarrete
- Lucha Reyes as Adela
- Marcus Goodrich as Dr. Marcus Aurelius Goodrich
- Salvador Quiroz as Salvador Quiroz
- Pedro Galindo as Pedro Galindo
- Raúl Guerrero as Tapón
- Aurora Walker as Monja
- Louis Alvarez as Pancho Villa
- Lupe del Castillo as Tomasa
- Max Langler as Sargento Tiburcio
- Hernán Vera as Político chihuahuense
- Paco Martínez as Cura

== Bibliography ==
- Amador, María Luisa. Cartelera cinematográfica, 1930-1939. Filmoteca, UNAM, 1980.
- Mraz, John. Looking for Mexico: Modern Visual Culture and National Identity. Duke University Press, 2009.
- Richard, Alfred. Censorship and Hollywood's Hispanic image: an interpretive filmography, 1936-1955. Greenwood Press, 1993.
