= Lupe del Castillo =

Mexican actress

- Other names: Guadalupe del Castillo
- Occupation: Actress
- Years active: 1939–1953

Lupe del Castillo was a Mexican actress who appeared during the Golden Age of Mexican cinema in supporting roles, usually as a maid or an elderly woman. Her films include Peach Blossom (1945), Rosenda (1948), and Comisario en turno (1949).

== Selected filmography ==
- With Villa's Veterans (1939)
- When the Stars Travel (1942)
- I Danced with Don Porfirio (1942)
- María Candelaria (1943)
- Father Morelos (1943)
- Beautiful Michoacán (1943)
- Resurrection (1943)
- Peach Blossom (1945)
- Strange Appointment (1947)
- Nocturne of Love (1948)
- The Genius (1948)
- Rosenda (1948)
- Comisario en turno (1949)
- La Gota de sangre (1950)
- The Doorman (1950)
- Good Night, My Love (1951)
- Tenement House (1951)
- Crime and Punishment (1951)
- Yes, My Love (1953)
- What Can Not Be Forgiven (1953)

== Bibliography ==
- García Riera, Emilio. Historia documental del cine mexicano: 1945. Ediciones Era, 1969.
