= Adventure in the Night =

1948 film

- Directed by: Rolando Aguilar
- Written by: Chano Urueta; Rolando Aguilar
- Produced by: Raúl de Anda
- Starring: Luis Aguilar; Miroslava; Susana Cora
- Cinematography: Raúl Martínez Solares
- Edited by: Carlos Savage
- Music by: Rosalío Ramírez
- Production company: Azteca Films
- Distributed by: Azteca Films
- Release date: 9 July 1948
- Running time: 90 minutes
- Country: Mexico
- Language: Spanish

Adventure in the Night (Spanish: Una aventura en la noche) is a 1948 Mexican mystery thriller film directed by Rolando Aguilar and starring Luis Aguilar, Miroslava and Susana Cora. It was shot at the Azteca Studios in Mexico City. The film's sets were designed by the art director José Rodríguez Granada.

== Synopsis ==
The plot focuses on two friends, a screenwriter and a film director, who pick up two young women on the road and offer then a lift. They later discover that the women had supposedly died two months earlier.

== Cast ==
- Luis Aguilar as Arturo Centella
- Miroslava as Elena
- Susana Cora as Amparo
- Jorge Reyes as Fernando Novoa
- Arturo Soto Rangel as Capitán de policía
- Manuel R. Ojeda as Profesor W. Castle
- Carlos Villarías as Don Adolfo
- Carlos Riquelme as Hijo de don Adolfo
- Francisco Reiguera as Malachias el mayordomo
- Maruja Grifell as Esposa de Alfonso
- Luisa Rooner as Clarita
- José Arratia as Alfonso
- Daniel Arroyo as Miembro del consejo
- Guillermo Bravo Sosa as Portero
- Enedina Díaz de León as Clienta de la espiritista
- Raúl Guerrero as Cliente espiritista
- Héctor Mateos as Miembro del consejo
- José Pardavé as Hernández
- Ignacio Peón as Cliente espiritista
- Joaquín Roche as Miembro del consejo
- Humberto Rodríguez as Miembro del consejo
- José Romero
- Ceferino Silva as Empleado del professor
- Manuel Trejo Morales as Doctor

== Bibliography ==
- Lentz, Harris M. Science fiction, horror and fantasy film and television credits. McFarland, 1983.
- Riera, Emilio García . Historia documental del cine mexicano: 1946-1948. Universidad de Guadalajara, 1992.
