= Carlos Martínez Baena =

Spanish-Mexican actor

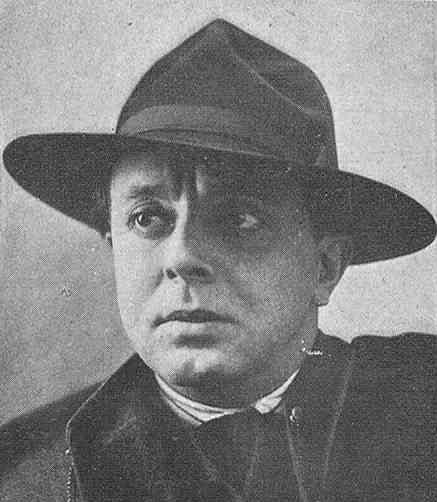
- Carlos Martínez Baena in 1929
- Born: 7 May 1889; Madrid, Spain
- Died: 29 May 1971 (aged 82); Mexico City, Mexico
- Occupation: Actor
- Years active: 1931–1970

Carlos Martínez Baena (7 May 1889 – 29 May 1971) was a Spanish-Mexican actor. At a young age he moved to Mexico with his family where he became a journalist. He appeared in more than seventy films from 1931 to 1970.

== Selected filmography ==
Year	Title	Role	Notes
1941	Oh, What Times, Don Simon!		
1944	Alma de bronce		
1945	The Hour of Truth		
1947	Music Inside		
1947	The Kneeling Goddess		
1947	Chachita from Triana		
1948	The Genius		
1948	The Well-paid		
1948	Nocturne of Love		
1949	The Bewitched House		
1949	Lola Casanova		
1950	The Doorman		
1950	Between Your Love and Heaven		
1951	El Siete Machos		
1952	Private Secretary		
1953	The Loving Women		
1953	The Spot of the Family		
1953	Él		
1953	Neither Rich nor Poor		
1953	Yes, My Love		
1954	La intrusa		
1955	The River and Death		
1958	A media luz los tres		
1961	El analfabeto		
