= Wife or Lover =

1950 film

- Directed by: Adolfo Fernández Bustamante
- Written by: Max Aub; Adolfo Fernández Bustamante; Rafael M. Saavedra
- Produced by: Eduardo Quevedo
- Starring: Rosario Granados; David Silva; Fernando Soto "Mantequilla"
- Cinematography: Agustín Jiménez
- Edited by: Alfredo Rosas Priego
- Music by: Antonio Díaz Conde
- Production company: Producciones Quevedo
- Release date: 21 June 1950
- Running time: 85 minutes
- Country: Mexico
- Language: Spanish

Wife or Lover (Spanish: Esposa o amante) is a 1950 Mexican drama film directed by Adolfo Fernández Bustamante and starring Rosario Granados, David Silva and Fernando Soto "Mantequilla". The film's sets were designed by the art director José Rodríguez Granada.

== Cast ==
- Rosario Granados
- David Silva
- Fernando Soto "Mantequilla"
- Prudencia Grifell
- Armando Arriola
- Conchita Gentil Arcos
- Maruja Grifell
- Guillermina Grin
- Ricardo Mondragón
- Manuel Noriega
- Ignacio Peón
- Salvador Quiroz
- Humberto Rodríguez
- María Luisa Serrano
- Jesús Valero
- Enrique Zambrano

== Bibliography ==
- Amador, María Luisa. Cartelera cinematográfica, 1950-1959. UNAM, 1985.
- Aviña, Rafael. David Silva: Un campeón de mil rostros. UNAM, 2007.
