= El Bruto =

1952 film by Luis Buñuel

- Theatrical release poster
- Directed by: Luis Buñuel
- Written by: Luis Alcoriza; Luis Buñuel
- Produced by: Gabriel Castro; Óscar Dancigers; Sergio Kogan
- Starring: Pedro Armendáriz
- Cinematography: Agustín Jiménez
- Edited by: Jorge Bustos
- Music by: Raúl Lavista
- Release date: February 5, 1953
- Running time: 81 minutes
- Country: Mexico
- Language: Mexican Spanish

The Brute (Spanish: El Bruto) is a 1953 Mexican drama film directed by Luis Buñuel and starring Pedro Armendáriz and Katy Jurado.

== Plot ==
Impoverished tenants are being evicted from their block of flats by their elderly landlord, Cabrera, who wants to build a house on the site for himself. The tenants refuse to leave, so the landlord, at the prompting of his young wife, Paloma, tells his strongest slaughterhouse worker, Pedro, known as El Bruto, to get rid of the ringleaders. When Pedro moves into the landlord’s house to work for him as a retail butcher and enforcer, Paloma, who also works in the shop, is strongly attracted to him. They begin an affair.

Starting the campaign, Pedro punches one of the ringleaders, the father of Meche, and kills the sick man unintentionally. This precipitates the other tenants to find and attack him, ending in a nail being stuck in his shoulder. He bursts into an apartment and, finding Meche, asks her to remove it. He falls in love with her despite her initial rejection, and faces divided loyalties as the landlord treats him like a son. El Bruto has a suspicion that the landlord had an affair with his mother when she was his maid, and is indeed his father.

When Pedro finds that Meche has been evicted and has been abandoned by the other tenants, he proposes marriage and offers her a home. When Paloma, paying another clandestine visit to Pedro, finds out that he now lives with Meche, in her jealous rage, she tells Meche that he killed her father. Meche, horrified, flees. Pedro strikes her. She returns home and tells the landlord falsely that El Bruto ravaged her. Cabrera issues instructions for Pedro to come to his house. When he does, Cabrera insults him and his mother and tries to kill him. Instead, Pedro kills him. Prompted by Paloma, the police pursue him and kill him in a shootout. The tenants are happy because they will no longer be evicted.

== Cast ==
- Pedro Armendáriz as Pedro
- Katy Jurado as Paloma
- Rosa Arenas as Meche
- Andrés Soler as Andrés Cabrera
- Roberto Meyer as Carmelo González
- Beatriz Ramos as Doña Marta
- Paco Martínez as Don Pepe
- Gloria Mestre as María
- Paz Villegas as María's mother
- José Muñoz as Lencho Ruíz
- Diana Ochoa as Lencho's wife
- Ignacio Villalbazo as María's brother
- Jaime Fernández as Julián García
- Raquel García as Doña Enriqueta
- Lupe Carriles as Maid
- Guillermo Bravo Sosa as El Cojo
- Benny García as El Gato
- Olga de la Chietla as La Chinita

== Release ==
On 21 September 1983, the film was screened at The Public Theater in conjunction with the death of the director. El Bruto was released on DVD on 23 October 2007. In 2023, El Bruto was restored in 4K and was released on DVD by VCI Entertainment.

== Reception ==
A retrospective review praises the film, although not often mentioned by the director himself, as one of the finest of his Mexican productions.

On review aggregator website Rotten Tomatoes, El Bruto has an approval rating of 88% based on 8 reviews, with an average score of 7.5/10.

== Accolades ==
Andrés Soler was nominated for the Ariel Award in the Best Supporting Actor category for The Brute, while Katy Jurado won in the Best Supporting Actress category. The film also was nominated for the Ariel Award in the Best Cinematography category in 1954.
