= José Rodríguez Granada =

Mexican art director

- Occupation: Art Director
- Years active: 1934–1990 (film)

José Rodríguez Granada was a Mexican art director who worked on more than two hundred films during his career.

== Selected filmography ==
- Judas (1936)
- Poppy of the Road (1937)
- Father's Entanglements (1939)
- The League of Songs (1941)
- The Escape (1944)
- The Queen of the Tropics (1946)
- The Prince of the Desert (1947)
- Voices of Spring (1947)
- Adventure in the Night (1948)
- Midnight (1949)
- Witch's Corner (1949)
- Veracruz Passion (1950)
- Wife or Lover (1950)
- Radio Patrol (1951)
- My General's Women (1951)
- Hot Rhumba (1952)
- The Three Happy Compadres (1952)
- The Three Happy Friends (1952)
- Nobody's Children (1952)
- Genius and Figure (1953)
- The Spot of the Family (1953)

== Bibliography ==
- Emilio García Riera. Historia documental del cine mexicano: 1929-1937. Universidad de Guadalajara, 1992.
