= The Thief (1947 film) =

- Directed by: Julio Bracho
- Written by: Julio Bracho
- Produced by: Gregorio Walerstein
- Starring: Luis Sandrini; Domingo Soler; Elsa Aguirre
- Cinematography: Raúl Martínez Solares
- Edited by: Carlos Savage
- Music by: Rosalío Ramírez; Federico Ruiz
- Production company: Filmex
- Release date: 13 November 1947
- Running time: 80 minutes
- Country: Mexico
- Language: Spanish

The Thief (Spanish:El ladrón) is a 1947 Mexican comedy film directed by Julio Bracho and starring Luis Sandrini, Domingo Soler and Elsa Aguirre.

== Cast ==
- Luis Sandrini as Plácido ópez
- Domingo Soler as Licenciado Marcelo Gómez Sosa
- Elsa Aguirre as Rosa
- Consuelo Guerrero de Luna as Señora Gómez
- Dolores Tinoco as Directora del orfanatorio
- Diana Bordes as Hija 1a
- Manuel Noriega as Viejito velador
- Humberto Rodríguez as Nuñez, empleado incinerador
- Angélica Rey as Hija 2a
- Lala Gil Bustamante as Hija 3a
- Argentina Casas as Cuatita 1a
- Carolina Casas as Cuatita 2a

== Bibliography ==
- Joanne Hershfield & David Maciel. Mexico's Cinema: A Century of Film and Filmmakers. 1999.
