= The Boxer (1958 film) =

1958 film

- Directed by: Gilberto Gazcón
- Written by: Edgardo Gazcón; Fernando Méndez
- Produced by: Valentín Gazcón
- Starring: Joaquín Cordero; Ariadna Welter; Arturo Martinez
- Cinematography: Ignacio Torres
- Edited by: Carlos Savage; Gloria Schoemann
- Music by: Gustavo César Carrión
- Production company: Cinematográfica Jalisco
- Release date: 17 July 1958
- Running time: 90 minutes
- Country: Mexico
- Language: Spanish

The Boxer (Spanish: El boxeador) is a 1958 Mexican sports drama film directed by Gilberto Gazcón and starring Joaquín Cordero, Ariadna Welter and Arturo Martinez.

It was shot at the Estudios Churubusco in Mexico City. The film's sets were designed by Salvador Lozano Mena.

== Cast ==
- Joaquín Cordero as Natalio Sanchez; Kid Relampago
- Ariadna Welter as Carmen
- Arturo Martinez as Indio López
- Alfonso Mejía as Ray Corona
- Miguel Ángel Ferriz as Doctor
- Carlos Ancira as Ronco
- Fanny Schiller as Madrastra de Carmen
- Enrique King as Entrenador
- Antonio Raxel as Don Arturo
- Francisco Rosales
- Guillermo Herrera as Hermano de Lupita
- Norma Angélica as Lupita
- Rogelio 'Frijolitos' Jiménez Pons as Espectador niño
- Ismael Rodríguez
- Salvador Lozano as Marido espectador boxeo
- José L. Murillo as Médico de la comisión
- Mario Cid as Revendedor de boletos
- José Luis Trejo
- Luis Aguilar as Cantante
- José Elías Moreno as Papá de Carmen
- Paco Malgesto as Paquito, locutor
- Celia D'Alarcón as Esposa espectadora boxeo
- Pancho Córdova as Amigo borracho de don Chon
- Pascual García Peña as Don Chon, borracho
- Luis Aldás as Espectador
- Freddy Fernández as Espectador
- Memo Diéz as Boxeador
- Jose Becerra as Boxeador
- Nacho Escalante as Boxeador
- Papelero Sánchez as Boxeador
- Gregorio Acosta as Espectador
- Regino Herrera as Espectador
- Mario Sevilla as Doctor
- Amado Zumaya as Boxeador ciego

== Bibliography ==
- Emilio García Riera. Historia documental del cine mexicano: 1957-1958. Universidad de Guadalajara, 1992.
