= Crime and Punishment (1951 film) =

1951 film

- Directed by: Fernando de Fuentes
- Written by: Paulino Masip
- Based on: Crime and Punishment; 1866 novel by Fyodor Dostoevsky
- Produced by: Fernando de Fuentes; Fernando de Fuentes hijo
- Starring: Roberto Cañedo; Lilia Prado; Carlos López Moctezuma
- Cinematography: Jorge Stahl Jr.
- Edited by: José W. Bustos
- Music by: Raúl Lavista
- Production company: Films de Fuentes
- Distributed by: Distribuidora Mexicana de Películas
- Release date: 5 July 1951
- Running time: 104 minutes
- Country: Mexico
- Language: Spanish

Crime and Punishment (Spanish:Crimen y castigo) is a 1951 Mexican film directed by Fernando de Fuentes and starring Roberto Cañedo, Lilia Prado and Carlos López Moctezuma.

It is an adaptation of Fyodor Dostoevsky's 1866 novel Crime and Punishment, with the setting updated to a contemporary Mexico City. The film's sets were designed by the art director Javier Torres Torija.

== Cast ==
- Roberto Cañedo as Ramón Bernal
- Lilia Prado as Sonia
- Carlos López Moctezuma as Delegado Porfirio Marín
- Luis Beristáin as Carlos
- Elda Peralta as María
- Fanny Schiller as Mamá de Ramón
- Lupe del Castillo as Doña Lorenza
- Rodolfo Calvo as Empleado delegación
- Enrique Carrillo as Cargador
- Enedina Díaz de León as Mujer busca empleo
- José Escanero as Portero
- Rafael Estrada as Roldan
- Juan Pulido as Pedro Luquin
- Salvador Quiroz as Cantinero
- Polo Ramos as Nicolás
- Nicolasito Rodriguez as Hijo de Nacho
- Humberto Rodríguez as Doctor
- Nicolás Rodríguez as Don Nacho
- Aurora Ruiz as Anastasia
- Ramón Sánchez as Cargador
- Salvador Sánchez
