= Nocturne of Love (1948 film) =

- Directed by: Emilio Gómez Muriel
- Written by: Luis Alcoriza; Janet Alcoriza
- Produced by: Salvador Elizondo
- Starring: Miroslava; Víctor Junco; Hilda Sour
- Cinematography: Raúl Martínez Solares
- Edited by: Jorge Bustos
- Music by: Raúl Lavista
- Production company: Clasa Films Mundiales
- Release date: 27 May 1948 (Mexico)
- Running time: 98 minutes
- Country: Mexico
- Language: Spanish

Nocturne of Love (Spanish: Nocturno de amor) is a 1948 Mexican drama film directed by Emilio Gómez Muriel and starring Miroslava, Víctor Junco and Hilda Sour, with the special participation of Yolanda Montes. It was co-written by Luis and Janet Alcoriza.

== Cast ==
- Miroslava as Marta Reyes
- Víctor Junco
- Hilda Sour
- Carlos Martínez Baena
- Miguel Ángel Ferriz
- Alfredo Varela
- Juan Orraca
- Francisco Reiguera
- Roberto Y. Palacios
- Lupe del Castillo
- Lilia Prado
- Juan Bruno Tarraza
- Yolanda Montes

== Bibliography ==
- Aviña, Rafael. David Silva: Un campeón de mil rostros. UNAM, 2007.
- González Casanova, Manuel. Luis Alcoriza: Soy un solitario que escribe. Diputación de Badajoz, Departamento de Publicaciones, 2006.
