= Raúl Martínez Solares =

Mexican cinematographer (1908–1972)

- Occupation: Cinematographer
- Years active: 1935–1973 (film)

Raúl Martínez Solares was a Mexican cinematographer. He began his career during the Golden Age of Mexican cinema.

== Selected filmography ==
- The Coward (1939)
- With Villa's Veterans (1939)
- I Danced with Don Porfirio (1942)
- The Rebel (1943)
- Resurrection (1943)
- The Lieutenant Nun (1944)
- The Daughter of the Regiment (1944)
- Tragic Wedding (1946)
- The Associate (1946)
- Love Makes Them Crazy (1946)
- The Thief (1947)
- Voices of Spring (1947)
- Adventure in the Night (1948)
- Nocturne of Love (1948)
- The Genius (1948)
- Philip of Jesus (1949)
- The Magician (1949)
- The Woman of the Port (1949)
- The Two Orphans (1950)
- Immaculate (1950)
- Between Your Love and Heaven (1950)
- Rosauro Castro (1950)
- History of a Heart (1951)
- The Masked Tiger (1951)
- They Say I'm a Communist (1951)
- She and I (1951)
- Women's Prison (1951)
- The Beautiful Dreamer (1952)
- The Three Happy Friends (1952)
- Hot Rhumba (1952)
- The Trace of Some Lips (1952)
- Seven Women (1953)
- You Had To Be a Gypsy (1953)
- Made for Each Other (1953)
- The Vagabond (1953)
- Black Ace (1954)
- After the Storm (1955)
- The Murderer X (1955)
- The Bandits of Cold River (1956)
- Every Child a Cross to Bear (1957)
- Raffles (1958)
- The White Renegade (1960)
- The Miracle Roses (1960)
- The White Sister (1960)
- House of Terror (1960)
- Romance in Puerto Rico (1962)
- So Loved Our Fathers (1964)
- The She-Wolf (1965)

== Bibliography ==
- Raymond Durgnat. Luis Bunuel. University of California Press, 1977.
