= A Decent Woman =

1950 film

- Directed by: Raúl de Anda
- Written by: Raúl de Anda; Fernando Méndez
- Produced by: Gabriel Alarcón; Raúl de Anda
- Starring: Elsa Aguirre; Rafael Baledón; Gloria Ríos; Maruja Grifell; Gloria Mange
- Cinematography: Ignacio Torres
- Edited by: Carlos Savage
- Music by: Jorge Pérez
- Production company: Cinematográfica Intercontinental
- Distributed by: Clasa-Mohme
- Release date: 18 October 1950
- Running time: 105 minutes
- Country: Mexico
- Language: Spanish

A Decent Woman (Spanish: Una mujer decente) is a 1950 Mexican drama film directed by Raúl de Anda and starring Elsa Aguirre, Rafael Baledón, Gloria Ríos, Maruja Grifell and Gloria Mange. It was shot at the Churubusco Studios in Mexico City. The film's sets were designed by the art director Jorge Fernández.

== Cast ==
- Elsa Aguirre as Rosa Gómez
- Rafael Baledón as Armando de la Vega
- Gloria Ríos as Catalina
- Maruja Grifell as Mamá de Margarita
- Gloria Mange as Margarita
- Angélica María as Rodolfo
- Conchita Gentil Arcos as Mamá de Rosa
- Roberto Meyer as Juan, mayordomo
- José Muñoz as Cantinero
- Héctor Mateos as Maestro
- Juan José Hurtado as Amigo de Armando
- Roberto G. Rivera as Pulgarcito, amigo de Armando
- Juan Orraca as Amigo de Armando
- Salvador Quiroz as Doctor

== Bibliography ==
- Amador, María Luisa. Cartelera cinematográfica, 1950-1959. UNAM, 1985.
- Aviña, Rafael. Una mirada insólita: temas y géneros del cine mexicano. Océano, 2004.
- Mariño, Cecilia Nuria Gil & Miranda, Laura. Identity Mediations in Latin American Cinema and Beyond: Culture, Music and Transnational Discourses. Cambridge Scholars Publishing, 2019.
