= Dizziness (film) =

1946 film by Antonio Momplet

- Directed by: Antonio Momplet
- Screenplay by: Mauricio Magdaleno; Antonio Momplet
- Based on: Alberte by Pierre Benoit
- Produced by: Salvador Elizondo
- Starring: María Félix; Emilio Tuero; Lilia Michel
- Cinematography: Alex Phillips
- Edited by: Jorge Bustos
- Music by: Jorge Pérez
- Production company: Clasa Films Mundiales
- Distributed by: Clasa-Mohme (1946) (United States - Spanish language)
- Release date: 14 February 1946
- Running time: 82 minutes
- Country: Mexico
- Language: Spanish

Dizziness (Spanish: Vértigo, lit. 'Vertigo') is a 1946 Mexican drama film directed by Antonio Momplet, starring María Félix, Emilio Tuero and Lilia Michel. It tells the story of a love triangle where a young widowed mother finds herself attracted to her daughter's fiancé. The film is based on the 1926 novel Alberte by Pierre Benoit.

== Plot ==
Mercedes Mallea (María Félix) is a woman who married when she was almost a child, and became widowed while she was still young and attractive. Despite her youth, Mercedes decides to spend a lonely life on her ranch, while her daughter Gabriela (Lilia Michel) leaves to study abroad. Years later, Gabriela returns home to introduce her mother to Arturo (Emilio Tuero), her future husband. Conflict breaks out when a deep and dangerous attraction begins to emerge between Mercedes and Arturo. After seeing the pain she is causing to her daughter, Mercedes tries to reject Arturo, but the love triangle ends in tragedy.

== Cast ==
- María Félix as Mercedes Mallea
- Emilio Tuero as Arturo
- Lilia Michel as Gabriela
- Julio Villarreal as Don Agustín
- Emma Roldán as Nana Joaquina
- Manuel Noriega as Santos
- Jorge Mondragón as Miguel Mendoza
- Rosa Castro as Augusta
- Arturo Soto Rangel as Padre Moncada
- Eduardo Arozamena as Don José María

== Production ==
According to María Félix in her autobiography Todas mis guerras, the script was originally written for Dolores del Río, but by a mistake of a messenger it was brought to Félix. On the contrary, the script for La selva de fuego (written for Félix), came into the hands of Del Río, who starred in the film.

== Awards ==
It received the 1947 Ariel Awards for Best Supporting Actress (Lilia Michel) and Best Special Effects, and was nominated for Best Actress in a Minor Role (Emma Roldán), Best Production Design and Best Costume Design.
