= The Minister's Daughter (1952 film) =

1952 film

- Directed by: Fernando Méndez
- Written by: Adolfo Fernández Bustamante; Gilberto Gazcón; Fernando Méndez; Fernando de Fuentes
- Produced by: Raúl de Anda
- Starring: Luis Aguilar; Rosita Arenas; Víctor Parra; Elda Peralta
- Cinematography: Ignacio Torres
- Edited by: Carlos Savage
- Music by: Manuel Esperón
- Production company: Cinematográfica Intercontinental
- Distributed by: Clasa-Mohme
- Release date: 19 September 1952
- Running time: 88 minutes
- Country: Mexico
- Language: Spanish

The Minister's Daughter (Spanish: La hija del ministro) is a 1952 Mexican romantic comedy film directed by Fernando Méndez and starring Luis Aguilar, Rosita Arenas, Víctor Parra and Elda Peralta. It was shot at the Churubusco Studios in Mexico City. The film's sets were designed by the art director Jorge Fernández.

== Synopsis ==
A young civil servant's career suddenly begins to flourish when it is believed that he is dating the daughter of a government minister.

== Cast ==
- Luis Aguilar as Enrique Murillo
- Rosita Arenas as Susana del Villar
- Víctor Parra as Enrique Lozano
- José Elías Moreno as Don Ramón del Villar
- Agustín Isunza as Don Pachis
- Elda Peralta as Lourdes, esposa de Lozano
- Arturo Martínez as Señor Antonio Riomonte
- Angélica Rey as Elvirita Gómez
- Javier de la Parra as Juan Hernández
- Juan José Hurtado as Señor Garrido
- Cuco Sánchez as Cantante de fondo
- Quintín Bulnes as Sansón

== Bibliography ==
- Amador, María Luisa. Cartelera cinematográfica, 1950-1959. UNAM, 1985.
- Dempster, Alec. Lotería Jarocha: Linoleum Prints. The Porcupine's Quill, 2013.
