= We Maids =

1951 film by Zacarías Gómez Urquiza

Nosotras las Sirvientas
- Directed by: Zacarías Gómez Urquiza
- Written by: Eduardo Galindo; Antonio Guzmán Aguilera; Zacarías Gómez Urquiza; Ramón Obón; Ramón Pérez Peláez
- Produced by: Eduardo Galindo; Jesús Galindo
- Starring: Alma Rosa Aguirre; Domingo Soler; Rubén Rojo
- Cinematography: Víctor Herrera
- Edited by: Jorge Busto
- Music by: Gonzalo Curiel
- Production company: Producciones Galindo Hermanos
- Distributed by: Filmadora Chapultepec
- Release date: 2 November 1951
- Running time: 90 minutes
- Country: Mexico
- Language: Spanish

We Maids (Spanish: Nosotras las sirvientas) is a 1951 Mexican romantic comedy film directed by Zacarías Gómez Urquiza and starring Alma Rosa Aguirre, Domingo Soler and Rubén Rojo. It was shot at the Tepeyac Studios in Mexico City. The film's sets were designed by the art director Francisco Marco Chillet.

== Synopsis ==
A young woman from the countryside travels to Mexico City to find work. In the capital she is almost run over by a wealthy man who gives her a job as a maid in his large house. She soon provokes the jealousy of his scheming fiancée.

== Cast ==
- Alma Rosa Aguirre as Claudia
- Domingo Soler as Don Ernesto
- Rubén Rojo as Felipe
- Nora Veryán as Teresa
- Alfredo Varela as Enrique
- Fanny Schiller as Mamá de Teresa
- Alberto Mariscal as Manuel
- Amparo Arozamena as Tita
- Lupe Llaca as Irene
- Julio Ahuet as Chofer camión
- Salvador Quiroz as Comisario
- Miguel Aceves Mejía as Cantante
- Daniel Arroyo as Invitado a fiesta
- Josefina Burgos as Espectadora accidente
- Alfonso Carti as Policía
- Enedina Díaz de León as Espectadora accidente
- Jesús Gómez as Pretendiente de Tita
- Leonor Gómez as Pasajera en camión
- Ignacio Peón as Espectador accidente
- Manuel Trejo Morales as Comisario 2
- Mariachi Vargas
- Acela Vidaurri as Espectadora accidente

== Bibliography ==
- Amador, María Luisa. Cartelera cinematográfica, 1950-1959. UNAM, 1985.
