= Max Langler =

Mexican actor

- Langler in My Memories of Mexico (1944)
- Occupation: Actor
- Years active: 1927–1949 (film)

Max Langler was a Mexican film actor who appeared in more than eighty productions during his career.

== Selected filmography ==
- Judas (1936)
- The Sign of Death (1939)
- With Villa's Veterans (1939)
- In the Times of Don Porfirio (1940)
- The Unknown Policeman (1941)
- I'm a Real Mexican (1942)
- The Black Angel (1942)
- Beautiful Michoacán (1943)
- Les Misérables (1943)
- My Memories of Mexico (1944)
- Porfirio Díaz (1944)
- Rosalinda (1945)
- The Queen of the Tropics (1946)
- The Flesh Commands (1948)
- Las tandas del principal (1949)

== Bibliography ==
- Rogelio Agrasánchez. Guillermo Calles: A Biography of the Actor and Mexican Cinema Pioneer. McFarland, 2010.
