= Among Lawyers I See You =

1951 film

- Directed by: Adolfo Fernández Bustamante
- Written by: Adolfo Fernández Bustamante; Paulino Masip
- Produced by: Fernando de Fuentes; Juan Bustillo Oro; Miguel Zacarías
- Starring: Armando Calvo; Carmen Montejo; Isabel del Puerto
- Cinematography: Jorge Stahl Jr.
- Edited by: José W. Bustos
- Music by: Gonzalo Curiel
- Production company: Producciones Dyana
- Release date: 3 March 1951
- Running time: 98 minutes
- Country: Mexico
- Language: Spanish

Among Lawyers I See You (Spanish: Entre abogados te veas) is a 1951 Mexican crime drama film directed by Adolfo Fernández Bustamante and starring Armando Calvo, Carmen Montejo and Isabel del Puerto. It was produced by Fernando de Fuentes. It was shot at the Tepeyac Studios in Mexico City. The film's sets were designed by the art director Javier Torres Torija.

== Cast ==
- Armando Calvo as El Abogangster
- Carmen Montejo as La Víctima
- Luis Beristáin as El Defensor
- Isabel del Puerto as La Amante
- Ramón Gay as El Catrín
- Sara Guasch as La Esposa
- Fernando Galiana as El Desfalcado
- Armando Espinosa as El Judío
- Fernando Casanova as El Barrilete
- Rafael Estrada as El Bígamo
- Juan José Piñeiro as El Banquero
- Queta Lavat as La Segunda Esposa
- Juan Calvo as El Patrón
- Chel López as El Lider

== Bibliography ==
- Amador, María Luisa. Cartelera cinematográfica, 1950-1959. UNAM, 1985.
- Riera, Emilio García. Historia documental del cine mexicano: 1949-1950. Universidad de Guadalajara, 1992
