= Domingo Soler =

Mexican actor and screenwriter (1901–1961)

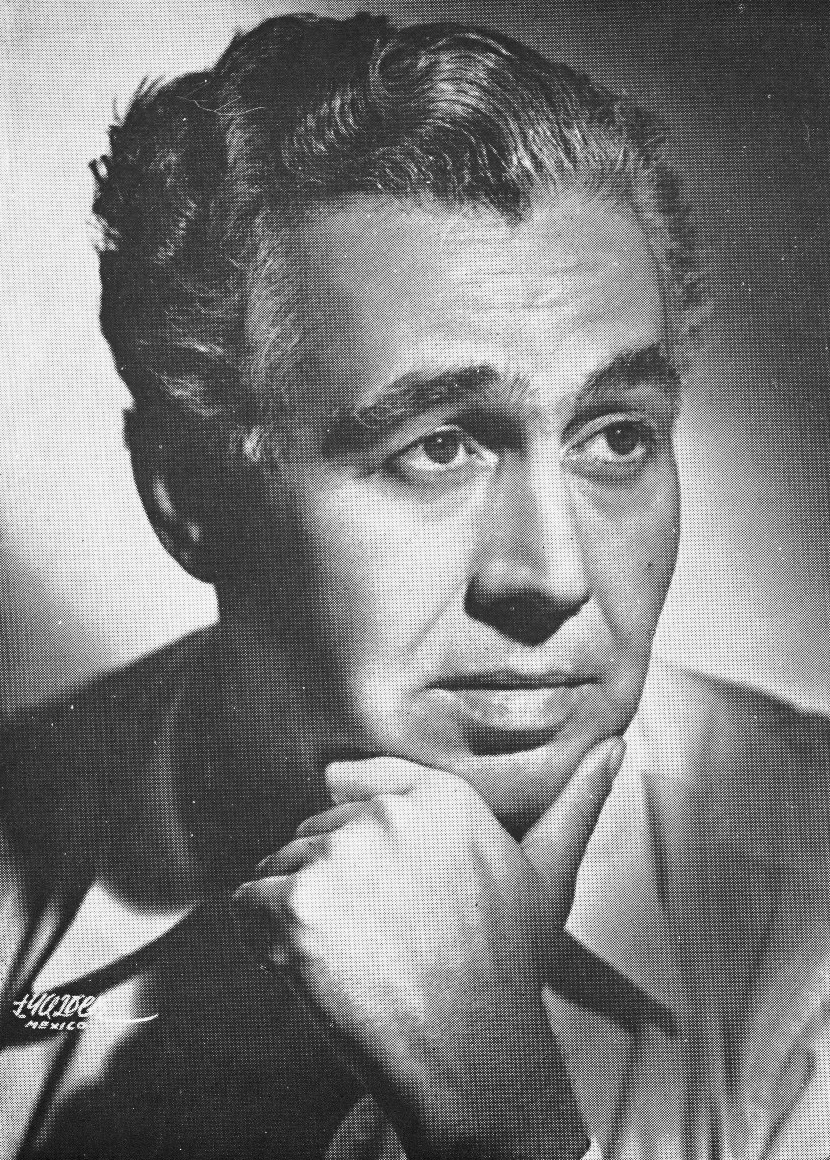
- Soler in 1954
- Born: Domingo Díaz Pavia; 17 April 1901; Chilpancingo, Guerrero, Mexico
- Died: 13 June 1961 (aged 60); Acapulco, Guerrero, Mexico
- Resting place: Panteón Jardín
- Occupations: Actor and screenwriter
- Spouse: Margarita Cortés
- Children: 2

Domingo Díaz Pavia (17 April 1901 – 13 June 1961), better known by the stage name Domingo Soler, was a Mexican actor and occasional screenwriter of the Golden Age of Mexican cinema. He appeared in over 150 films and wrote the screenplays for 2 films.

Soler won an Ariel Award for Best Actor for his performance in the 1945 drama film The Shack, making him the first winner in that category.

== Early life ==
Domingo Soler was born in Chilpancingo, Guerrero as Domingo Díaz Pavía on 17 April 1901 to Domingo Díaz García, a Galician actor, and Irene Pavía Soler, a Valencian actress. His parents were Spanish theater actors who had come to Mexico with a theatrical company. He was the younger brother of Fernando Soler and Andrés Soler, as well as the elder brother of Julián Soler and Mercedes Soler. His family is known as the Soler Dynasty.

== Selected filmography ==
- The Woman of the Port (1934)
- Gold and Silver (1934)
- Por mis pistolas (1938)
- The Whip (1939)
- The Queen of the River (1939)
- With Villa's Veterans (1939)
- The League of Songs (1941)
- The Count of Monte Cristo (1942)
- Del rancho a la capital (1942)
- When the Stars Travel (1942)
- The Saint Who Forged a Country (1942)
- Simón Bolívar (1942)
- El verdugo de Sevilla (1942)
- Les Misérables (1943)
- Father Morelos (1943)
- Lightning in the South (1943)
- The War of the Pastries (1944)
- The Shack (1945)
- The Thief (1947)
- Voices of Spring (1947)
- The Fourth Commandment (1948)
- Opium (1949)
- Love in Every Port (1949)
- Lost (1950)
- Red Rain (1950)
- The Little House (1950)
- The Two Orphans (1950)
- Orange Blossom for Your Wedding (1950)
- We Maids (1951)
- The Shrew (1951)
- Sensuality (1951)
- My Goddaughter's Difficulties (1951)
- The Border Man (1952)
- The Lie (1952)
- Soledad's Shawl (1952)
- The Three Elenas (1954)
- A Tailored Gentleman (1954)
- Tehuantepec (1954)
- Sube y baja (1959)
- His First Love (1960)
- My Mother Is Guilty (1960)
