= Adolfo Fernández Bustamante =

Mexican screenwriter and film director

- Born: 27 September 1898; Veracruz, Mexico
- Died: 27 September 1957 (aged 59); Mexico City, Mexico
- Occupations: Director, Writer
- Years active: 1939-1957 (film)

Adolfo Fernández Bustamante (1898–1957) was a Mexican screenwriter and film director.

== Selected filmography ==
- The Coward (1939)
- El baisano Jalil (1942)
- The Two Orphans (1944)
- The Mulatta of Cordoba (1945)
- Autumn and Spring (1949)
- Doctor on Call (1950)
- Wife or Lover (1950)
- Among Lawyers I See You (1951)
- Paco the Elegant (1952)
- The Minister's Daughter (1952)
- Hotel Room (1953)
- To the Four Winds (1955)

== Bibliography ==
- María Luisa Amador. Cartelera cinematográfica, 1950-1959. UNAM, 1985.
