= Genius and Figure =

1953 film by Luis Aguilar

- Directed by: Fernando Méndez
- Written by: Gilberto Gazcón; Fernando Méndez; Raúl de Anda
- Produced by: Raúl de Anda
- Starring: Luis Aguilar; Antonio Badú; Esther Fernández; Linda Cristal
- Cinematography: Ignacio Torres
- Edited by: Carlos Savage
- Music by: Luna de la Fuente Gabriel; Sergio Guerrero
- Production company: Cinematográfica Intercontinental
- Distributed by: Cinematográfica Intercontinental
- Release date: 2 July 1953
- Running time: 90 minutes
- Country: Mexico
- Language: Spanish

Genius and Figure (Spanish: Genio y figura) is a 1953 Mexican comedy film directed by Fernando Méndez and starring Luis Aguilar, Antonio Badú, Esther Fernández and Linda Cristal. It was shot at the Churubusco Studios in Mexico City. The film's sets were designed by the art director José Rodríguez Granada.

== Plot ==
Antonio is a player who abandoned his woman as soon as she gives birth. Antonio's friend Luis, will do his best to make him go back to his family.

== Cast ==
- Luis Aguilar as Luis Jiménez
- Antonio Badú as Antonio Vargas
- Esther Fernández as Esther
- Evangelina Elizondo as Victoria Rey
- Linda Cristal as Rosita
- Gloria Mestre as Alicia del Río
- Miguel Ángel Ferriz as Doctor
- Aurora Walker as Enfermera
- Manuel Noriega as Doctor Torres
- Salvador Quiroz as Gerente de hotel
- Pascual García Peña as Comisario

== Bibliography ==
- Alfaro, Eduardo de la Vega. Fernando Méndez, 1908-1966. Universidad de Guadalajara, 1995.
- Paranaguá, Paulo Antonio. Mexican Cinema. British Film Institute, 1995.
- Vitali, Valentina. Capital and Popular Cinema: The Dollars are Coming!. Manchester University Press, 2016.
