= Cock o' the Walk (1953 film) =

1953 film by Roberto Rodríguez

- Directed by: Roberto Rodríguez
- Written by: Carlos González Dueñas; Ricardo Parada de León; Roberto Rodríguez
- Starring: Sara Montiel; Joaquín Cordero; Freddy Fernández
- Cinematography: Jack Draper
- Edited by: Jorge Busto
- Music by: Manuel Esperón
- Production company: Películas Rodríguez
- Release date: 18 August 1953
- Running time: 105 minutes
- Country: Mexico
- Language: Spanish

Cock o' the Walk (Spanish: Yo soy gallo dondequiera!..) is a 1953 Mexican comedy film directed by Roberto Rodríguez and starring Sara Montiel, Joaquín Cordero and Freddy Fernández.

== Cast ==
- Sara Montiel as Rosalia
- Joaquín Cordero as Jimmy; Joaquín
- Freddy Fernández as Juanito
- Julio Villarreal as don Plutarco
- Marco de Carlo as Felipe
- Alicia Rodríguez as Lupe
- Salvador Quiroz as don Pedro, presidente municipal
- Roberto Meyer as Licenciado Ruvalcaba
- Alejandro Parodi as Alejandro
- Lidia Franco as Pueblerina
- Rafael Icardo as Cura
- Cecilia Leger as Clienta de Jimmy
- José Pardavé as Pueblerino
- Hernán Vera as Cantinero

== Bibliography ==
- María Luisa Amador. Cartelera cinematográfica, 1950-1959. UNAM, 1985.
