= The Spot of the Family =

1953 film

- Directed by: Fernando Méndez
- Written by: Gilberto Gazcón; Fernando Méndez; Raúl de Anda
- Produced by: Raúl de Anda
- Starring: Luis Aguilar; Antonio Badú; Sara García; Esther Fernández
- Cinematography: Ignacio Torres
- Edited by: Carlos Savage
- Music by: Sergio Guerrero
- Production company: Cinematográfica Intercontinental
- Distributed by: Cinematográfica Intercontinental
- Release date: 20 May 1953
- Running time: 103 minutes
- Country: Mexico
- Language: Spanish

The Spot of the Family or The Family's Flaw (Spanish: El lunar de la familia) is a 1953 comedy drama film directed by Fernando Méndez and starring Luis Aguilar, Antonio Badú, Sara García and Esther Fernández. It was shot at the Churubusco Studios in Mexico City. The film's sets were designed by the art director José Rodríguez Granada.

== Cast ==
- Luis Aguilar as Luis Jiménez
- Antonio Badú as Antonio Vargas; Toño
- Sara García as Doña Luisa Jiménez
- Esther Fernández as Esther
- Linda Cristal as Rosita
- Sara Montes as Lupita
- José Elías Moreno as Don Maurelio
- Josefina Leiner as Anita
- Quintín Bulnes as Feliciano
- Carlos Martínez Baena as Padre José
- Pepe del Río as Joaquinito
- Jorge Treviño as Don Melquiades
- Conchita Gentil Arcos as Mamá de Feliciano
- Manuel Noriega as Doctor Torres
- Francisco Avitia as Cantante
- Ana Bertha Lepe as Muchacha en cantina
- Lupe Carriles as Doña Chole
- Roberto Meyer as Juez
- Omar Jasso as Sacristán
- Carlos Robles Gil as Invitado a boda

== Bibliography ==
- Alfaro, Eduardo de la Vega. Fernando Méndez, 1908-1966. Universidad de Guadalajara, 1995.
- Paranaguá, Paulo Antonio. Mexican Cinema. British Film Institute, 1995.
- Riera, Emilio García . Historia documental del cine mexicano: 1952. Ediciones Era, 1969.
- Vitali, Valentina. Capital and Popular Cinema: The Dollars are Coming!. Manchester University Press, 2016.
