= The Strange Passenger =

1953 film

- Directed by: Fernando A. Rivero
- Written by: Carlos Luquín; Alejandro Núñez Alonso; Fernando A. Rivero
- Produced by: Agustín David Ortigosa; Óscar Dancigers
- Starring: Emilia Guiú; Víctor Manuel Mendoza; Tito Junco
- Cinematography: Manuel Gómez Urquiza
- Edited by: Carlos Savage
- Music by: Luis Hernández Bretón
- Production company: Producciones Tepeyac
- Release date: 4 June 1953
- Running time: 83 minutes
- Country: Mexico
- Language: Spanish

The Strange Passenger (Spanish: La extraña pasajera) is a 1953 Mexican mystery film directed by Fernando A. Rivero and starring Emilia Guiú, Víctor Manuel Mendoza and Tito Junco. It was shot at the Tepeyac Studios in Mexico City. The film's sets were designed by the art director Edward Fitzgerald.

== Cast ==
- Emilia Guiú as Yolanda
- Víctor Manuel Mendoza as Rodolfo Castillo
- Tito Junco as El dandy
- Miguel Ángel Ferriz as Coronel Macías
- Arturo Soto Rangel as Auditor Camacho
- José Ángel Espinosa 'Ferrusquilla' as Lucas Soriano
- José Torvay as Negrete, detective de banco
- Antonio Bravo as Tomás Pizarro
- Roberto Corell as Agente Benitez
- Dalia Íñiguez as Beata
- Irlanda Mora as Hija de beata
- José Luis Rojas as Esteban Fuentes
- Maricruz Olivier as Carmela
- Pedro Galván as Jorge Morales, banquero
- León Barroso as Empleado de tren
- José Chávez as Subteniente
- Maria Aurelia de Torres as Vendedora de comida
- Rogelio Fernández as Detective Cortina
- Eulalio González as Conductor de tren
- Jesús Gómez as Militar
- Ana María Hernández as Abuela en tren
- Elodia Hernández as Pasajera en tren
- Álvaro Matute as Germán, mesero
- Ángel Merino as Militar
- Ignacio Peón as Pasajero en tren
- Carlos Robles Gil as Pasajero en tren

== Bibliography ==
- Amador, María Luisa. Cartelera cinematográfica, 1950-1959. UNAM, 1985.
