= The Sword of Granada =

1953 Mexican historical adventure film

- American poster
- Directed by: Edward Dein; Carlos Véjar hijo
- Written by: Edward Dein; Mildred Dein; Rafael García Travesi
- Produced by: Jorge García Besné
- Starring: Cesar Romero; Katy Jurado; Rebeca Iturbide
- Cinematography: Enrique Wallace
- Edited by: Carlos Savage
- Music by: Antonio Díaz Conde
- Production company: Producciones García Besn
- Distributed by: Azteca Films
- Release date: 24 January 1954; (General release)
- Running time: 80 minutes
- Country: Mexico
- Language: Spanish

The Sword of Granada (Spanish: El corazón y la espada) is a 1953 Mexican historical adventure film shot in 3D and directed by Edward Dein and Carlos Véjar hijo and starring Cesar Romero, Katy Jurado and Rebeca Iturbide. It was shot at the Tepeyac Studios in Mexico City. The film's sets were designed by the art director Jorge Fernández. It was released in the United States in 1956.

== Cast ==
- Cesar Romero as Don Pedro de Rivera
- Katy Jurado as Lolita
- Rebeca Iturbide as Princesa Esme
- Tito Junco as Ponce de León
- Miguel Ángel Ferriz as Padre Angélico
- Fernando Casanova as Capitán del califa
- Gloria Mestre as Mensajera de Princesa Esme
- Víctor Alcocer as Califa de Granada
- José Torvay
- Norma Ancira as Sara, doncella de Esme
- Manuel Casanueva as Alquimista
- Antonio Haro Oliva
- Ramón Sánchez as Azotador

== Bibliography ==
- Quinlan, David (2000). Quinlan's Film Stars. Batsford. ISBN 9780713486513.
