= Luis Aguilar (actor) =

Mexican actor and singer (1918–1997)

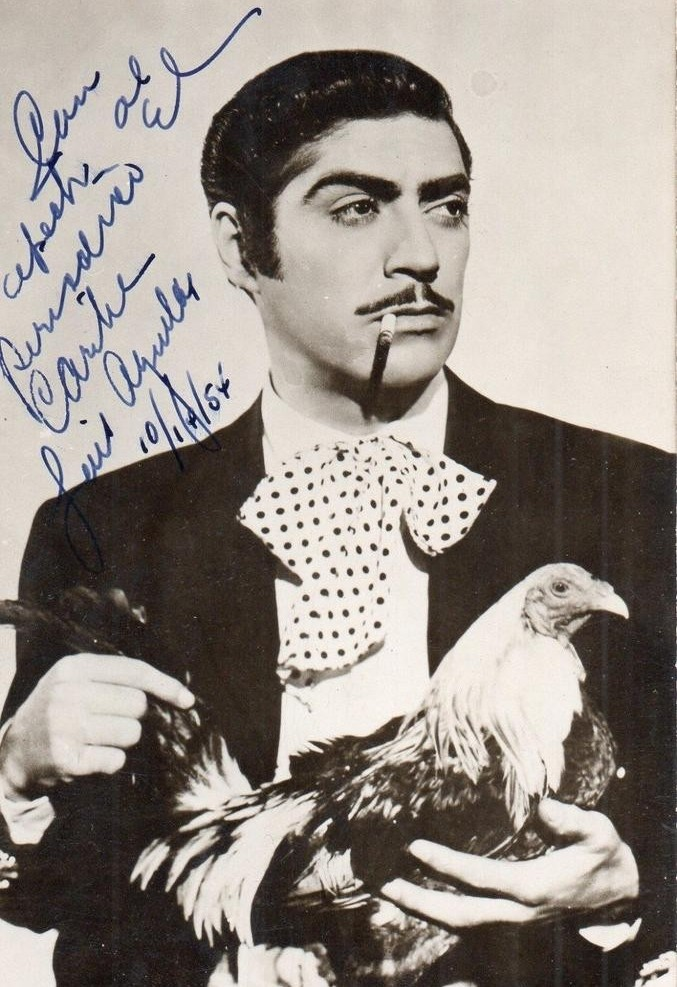
- Aguilar in 1954
- Born: Luis Aguilar Manzo; January 29, 1918; Hermosillo, Sonora, Mexico
- Died: October 24, 1997 (aged 79); Mexico City, Mexico
- Other name: El Gallo Giro
- Years active: 1942–1997
- Spouses: Ana María Almada (m. 1946; div. 1954) Rosario Gálvez (m. 1957–1997)
- Children: 4, (one stepson)
- Musical career
- Genres: Ranchera; mariachi
- Instruments: Vocals

Luis Aguilar Manzo (29 January 1918 – 24 October 1997) was a Mexican actor and singer. He was also known as El Gallo Giro, and was noted for his performances in films such as El 7 leguas (1955) and El látigo negro (1958).

Aguilar was born in Hermosillo, Sonora, Mexico. He was given his first leading role in the film Sota, Caballo y Rey (1944). He had two daughters (Anna Luisa, and Martha Fernanda Aguilar) from his first marriage, and a son (Luis Aguilar Doblado) from his second marriage with Rosario Gálvez. He died on 24 October 1997 in his sleep.

== Selected filmography ==
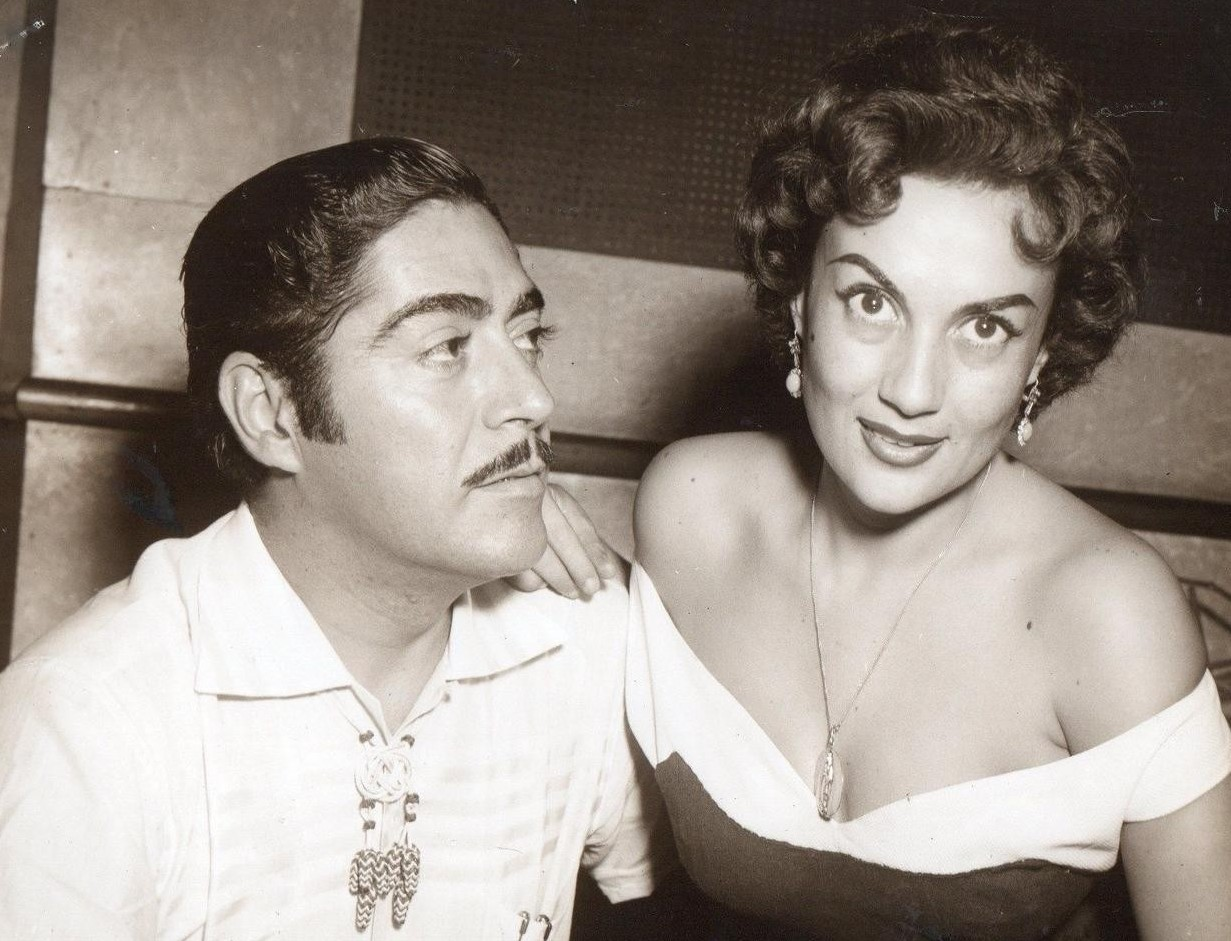
Aguilar with María Elena Marqués in 1955

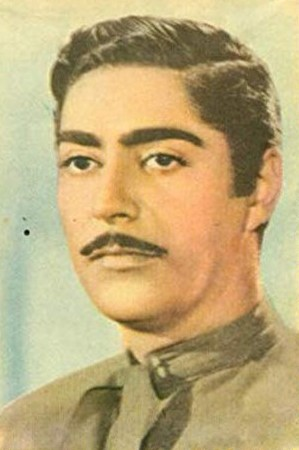
Aguilar, c. 1950s

- I'm a Real Mexican (1942)
- The Queen of the Tropics (1946)
- The Game Rooster (1948)
- Adventure in the Night (1948)
- Primero soy mexicano (1950)
- What Has That Woman Done to You? (1951)
- Full Speed Ahead (1951)
- The Masked Tiger (1951)
- Victims of Divorce (1952)
- The Minister's Daughter (1952)
- The Bachelors (1953)
- Sueños de gloria (1953)
- The Spot of the Family (1953)
- Made for Each Other (1953)
- Pain (1953)
- Genius and Figure (1953)
- The Bandits of Cold River (1956)
- Here Are the Aguilares! (1957)
- The Headless Rider (1957)
- Music and Money (1958)
- The Boxer (1958)
- It Happened in Mexico (1958)
- Black Skull (1960)
- Northern Courier (1960)
- My Wedding Night (1961)
- The Two Apostles (1966)
