= Made for Each Other (1953 film) =

1953 film by Rogelio A. González

- Directed by: Rogelio A. González
- Written by: Ernesto Cortázar; Fernando Galiana
- Produced by: Óscar J. Brooks; Felipe Mier
- Starring: Jorge Negrete; María Elena Marqués; Luis Aguilar
- Cinematography: Raúl Martínez Solares
- Edited by: Carlos Savage
- Music by: Ernesto Cortázar; Manuel Esperón
- Production company: Mier y Brooks
- Release date: 15 January 1953
- Running time: 106 minutes
- Country: Mexico
- Language: Spanish

Made for Each Other (Spanish: Tal para cual) is a 1953 Mexican musical comedy film directed by Rogelio A. González and starring Jorge Negrete, María Elena Marqués and Luis Aguilar.

== Main cast ==
- Jorge Negrete as Melitón Galván; Paco
- María Elena Marqués as Susana de la Rosa
- Luis Aguilar as Chabelo Cruz
- Rosa de Castilla as Rosaura
- Queta Lavat as Paula
- Ana María Villaseñor as Carmela
- Georgina González as Luz
- Lupe Carriles as Nana Joaquina
- Armando Arriola as Don Rafael García, padre de Paula
- Bertha Lehar as Maestra
- Jesús Valero as Doctor
- Rodolfo Calvo as Presidente municipal
- Raquel Muñoz as Amiga polla de Paco
- José Pidal as Señor cura
- María Luisa Cortés as Amiga polla de Paco
- Diana Ochoa as Madre de Luz y Carmela

== Bibliography ==
- Sergio de la Mora. Cinemachismo: Masculinities and Sexuality in Mexican Film. University of Texas Press, 2009.
