= Neither Rich nor Poor =

1953 film by Fernando Cortés

- Directed by: Fernando Cortés
- Cinematography: Gabriel Figueroa
- Edited by: Gloria Schoemann
- Release date: 26 February 1953
- Running time: 85 minutes
- Country: Mexico
- Language: Spanish

Neither Rich nor Poor (Spanish: Ni pobres ni ricos) is a 1953 Mexican comedy drama film directed by Fernando Cortés.

== Cast ==
- Lily Aclemar
- Pepe Biondi
- Guillermo Bravo Sosa
- Dick
- Fernando Galiana
- Ángel Garasa
- Conchita Gentil Arcos
- Agustín Isunza
- José Jasso
- José Alfredo Jiménez
- Víctor Junco
- Ismael Larumbe
- Carlos Martínez Baena
- Gloria Marín
- Pepe Nava
- Manuel Noriega
- José Pidal
- Francisco Reiguera
- Abel Salazar
- Manuel Santigosa
- Jorge Treviño
- Alfredo Varela padre
- Pedro Vargas
- Armando Velasco
- Acela Vidaurri

== Bibliography ==
- María Luisa Amador. Cartelera cinematográfica, 1950-1959. UNAM, 1985.
