= Pain (film) =

- Directed by: Miguel Morayta
- Written by: Paulino Masip (play); Alejandro Verbitzky (play); Miguel Morayta
- Produced by: Fernando de Fuentes hijo; Cesáreo González; Carmelo Santiago
- Starring: Lola Flores; Luis Aguilar; Antonio Badú
- Cinematography: Enrique Wallace
- Edited by: José W. Bustos
- Production companies: Diana Films; Suevia Films
- Distributed by: Suevia Films
- Release date: 24 September 1953
- Running time: 95 minutes
- Countries: Mexico; Spain
- Language: Spanish

Pain or Oh Pain, Little Pain, Pain (Spanish: ¡Ay, pena, penita, pena!) is a 1953 Mexican-Spanish musical comedy film directed by Miguel Morayta and starring Lola Flores, Luis Aguilar and Antonio Badú.

== Cast ==
- Lola Flores
- Luis Aguilar
- Antonio Badú
- Fernando Soto "Mantequilla"
- Rafael Llamas
- Miguel Ángel Ferriz
- Enrique García Álvarez
- Rafael Estrada
- Carmen Flores
- Faíco
- Francisco Aguilera as Guitarist
- El Trío Aguilillas
- Mariachi México
- Daniel Arroyo as Hombre en restaurante

== Bibliography ==
- Mira, Alberto. The A to Z of Spanish Cinema. Rowman & Littlefield, 2010.
