= Sara Guasch =

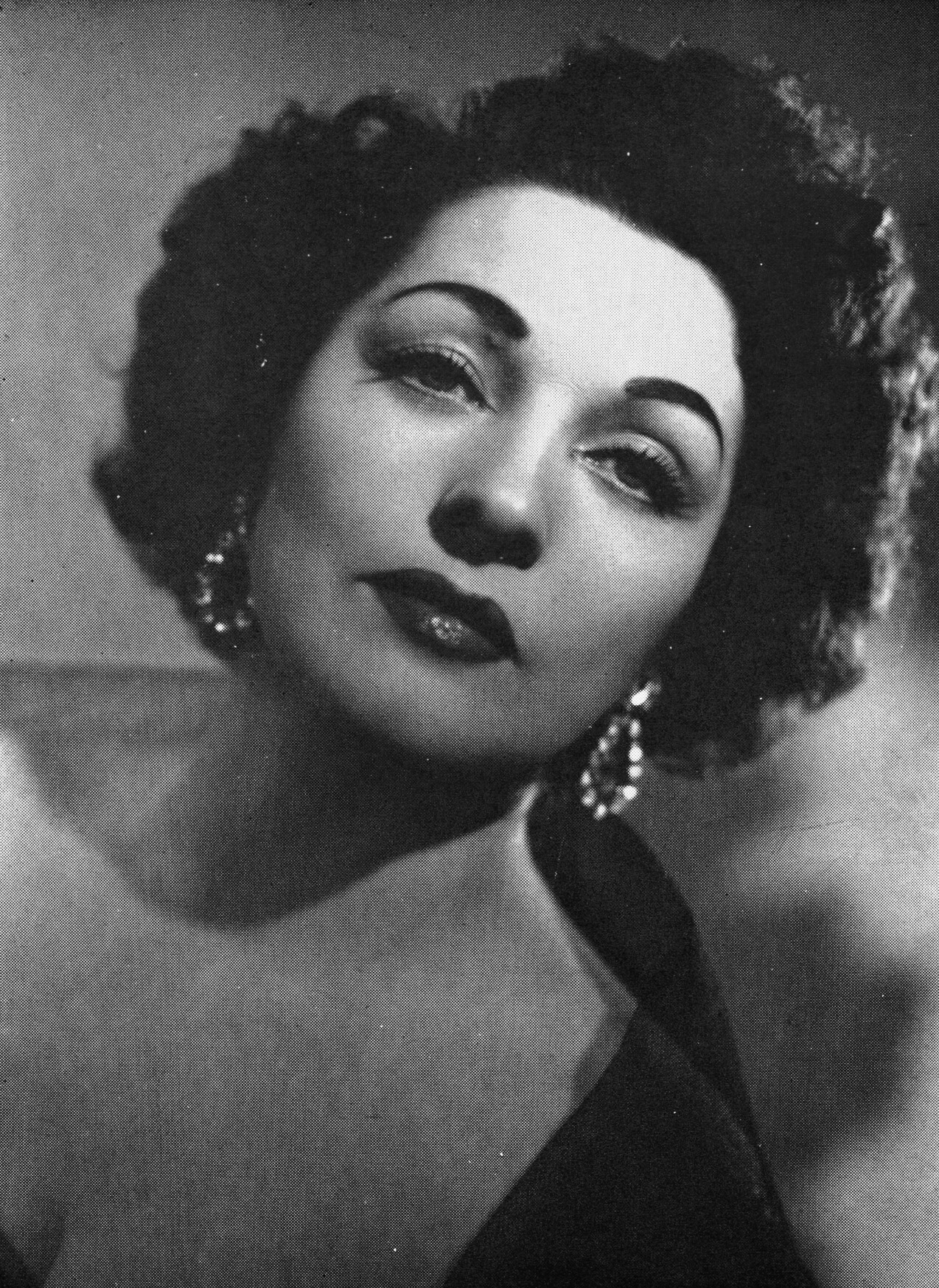
- Guasch in 1954
- Born: 21 November 1918; Valparaíso, Chile
- Died: 1 June 2005 (aged 86); Mexico City, Mexico
- Other name: Sara Guash
- Occupation: Actress
- Years active: 1944–1990 (film)

Sara Guasch (21 November 1918 – 1 June 2005) was a Chilean-born actress who spent much of her career working in Mexico. She appeared in more than seventy films and television programmes. She is also known as Sara Guash.

== Selected filmography ==
- The House of the Fox (1945)
- Love for Sale (1951)
- Canasta uruguaya (1951)
- The Cry of the Flesh (1951)
- Among Lawyers I See You (1951)
- Passionflower (1952)
- Seven Women (1953)
- Hotel Room (1953)
- The Loving Women (1953)
- The Three Elenas (1954)
- De carne somos (1955)
- The Hidden One (1956)
- Asesinos, S.A. (1957)
- Our Man in Casablanca (1966)

== Bibliography ==
- Bloom, Nicholas Dagen. Adventures Into Mexico: American Tourism Beyond the Border. Rowman & Littlefield, 2006.
