= Elsa Aguirre =

Mexican actress (1930–2026)

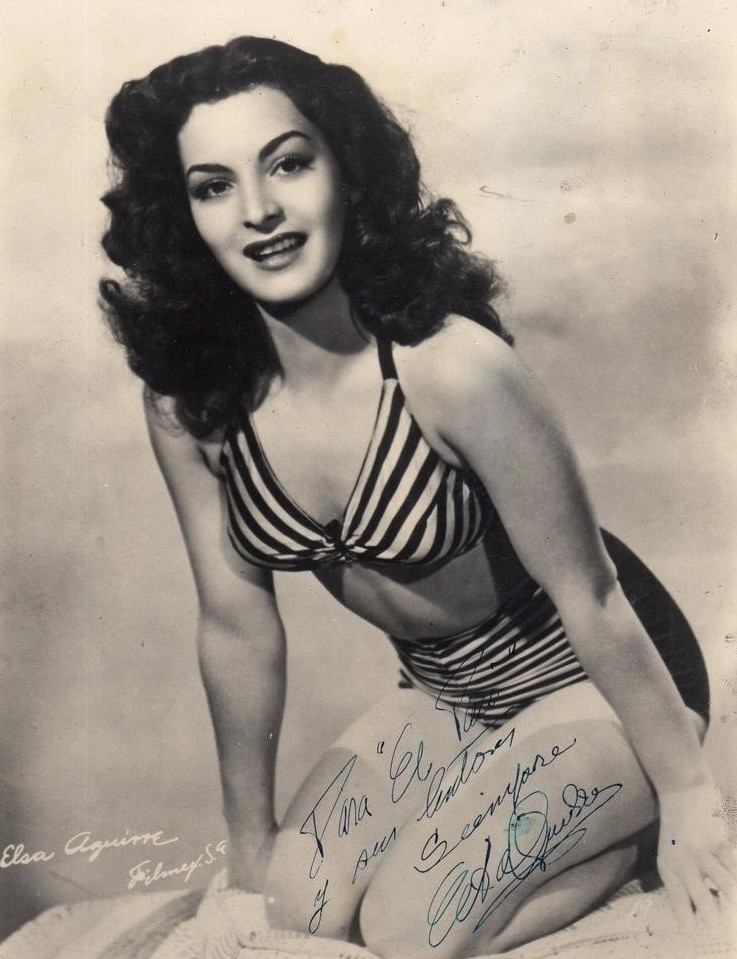
- Aguirre in the 1950s
- Born: Elsa Irma Aguirre Juárez; 25 September 1930; Chihuahua City, Chihuahua, Mexico
- Died: 14 July 2026 (aged 95); Cuernavaca, Morelos, Mexico
- Occupation: Actress
- Years active: 1946–1959; 1962–2004
- Children: 1
- Family: Alma Rosa Aguirre (sister)

Elsa Irma Aguirre Juárez (Note: In this Spanish name, the first or paternal surname is Aguirre and the second or maternal family name is Juárez.) (25 September 1930 – 14 July 2026), known professionally as Elsa Aguirre, was a Mexican actress.

Among her most notable works are her participation in the films: Ojos de juventud (1948), Lluvia roja (1950), La mujer que yo amé (1950), Cuatro noches contigo (1952), Cuidado con el amor (1954), Vainilla, bronce y morir (1957), Sólo de noche vienes (1965), Casa de mujeres (1966), El día de la boda (1968) and El cuerpazo del delito (1970).

== Career ==
Aguirre in a video from February 2026

Aguirre's acting career began when she was discovered while a teenager, in a beauty contest held by a cinematographic production company called CLASA Films Mundiales, which was looking for new talent. Thus, she and her sister Alma Rosa were chosen to appear in their first film called El sexo fuerte in 1945, directed by Emilio Gómez Muriel. Thereafter, she starred in many types of films such as drama, romance, action, and fiction. Elsa Aguirre appeared with her sister Alma Rosa in some of her films.

One of her films is Algo flota sobre el agua (1947) directed by Alfredo B. Crevenna, in which she starred with Arturo de Córdova. She inspired a song called Flor de azalea, composed by Zacarías Gómez Urquiza and Manuel Esperón exclusively for her. This song was the soundtrack of this film. Aguirre also appeared in theatre, television series, and singing in live shows.

== Death ==
Aguirre died at her home in Cuernavaca, Morelos, on 14 July 2026, at the age of 95.

== Filmography ==
=== Film ===
Year	Title	Role	Other notes
1946	El sexo fuerte	Minister of Health	
1946	El pasajero diez mil	Cigarette vendor	
1946	Don Simón de Lira	Blanquita Alas de Cuervo	
1947	El ladrón	Rosita	
1948	Algo flota sobre el agua	Azalea	Something Floats on the Water (International English title)
1948	Los viejos somos así	Dalia	
1948	Ojos de juventud	Raquel Herrera	
1949	Medianoche	Cora Moreno	Midnight (International English title)
1950	La mujer que yo amé	Rosita	
1950	La liga de las muchachas	Dorita	Adorables rebeldes (alternate title)
1950	Lluvia roja	Elisa	
1950	Una mujer decente	Rosa Gómez	
1951	Amar fue su pecado	Elena	
1951	La estatua de carne	La Gioconda	
1952	Acapulco	Diana Lozano	
1952	Cuatro noches contigo	Elsa Peralta	
1954	La perversa	Alicia Bermúdez	
1954	Cantando nace el amor	Yolanda	
1954	Cuidado con el amor	Ana María	
1955	Estafa de amor	Mayté	
1956	La doncella de piedra	Remota Montiel	
1956	Orgullo de mujer	Ada Montalvo	
1956	Giant	Unknown role	Uncredited; Hollywood production
1957	La mujer de dos caras	Silvia	
1957	Vainilla, bronce y morir	Laura Sandoval	
1958	Ama a tu prójimo	Dr. Beatriz Durán	
1960	Pancho Villa y la Valentina	La Valentina	
1966	Sólo de noche vienes	Remedios	
1966	Casa de mujeres	Carmen, la marinera	The Son of All – International English title
1967	El pistolero desconocido (El comandante Tijerina)	María	
1967	La vuelta del mexicano	Rosario	
1968	El día de la boda	Gilda	
1969	El matrimonio es como el demonio	Hilda Cervantes	
1970	Cómo enfriar a mi marido	Elsa	
1970	El cuerpazo del delito	María de Jesús 'Chuchet'	Segment: La seductora
1970	Las figuras de arena	Mother of Dabey	
1970	Los años vacíos	Olivia	
1977	La muerte de un gallero	Rosalina	
1980	Albur de amor	Gloria	

=== Television ===
Year	Title	Role
1995	Acapulco, cuerpo y alma	Doña Ana Elena Pérez viuda de Montalvo
1999	Mujeres Engañadas	Cecilia Orendáin de Martínez
2001	Lo que es el amor	Abril Castellanos
2004	Belinda	Unknown role

== Bibliography ==
- Agrasánchez Jr., Rogelio (2001). Bellezas del cine mexicano/Beauties of Mexican Cinema. Archivo Fílmico Agrasánchez. ISBN 968-5077-11-8.
