= Hotel Room (film) =

1953 film by Adolfo Fernández Bustamante

- Directed by: Adolfo Fernández Bustamante
- Written by: José Arenas Aguilar; Adolfo Fernández Bustamante
- Starring: Lilia Prado; Roberto Cañedo; Sara Guasch
- Cinematography: José Ortiz Ramos
- Edited by: Carlos Savage
- Music by: Carlos Tirado
- Production company: Productora Atlas
- Release date: 13 August 1953
- Running time: 98 minutes
- Country: Mexico
- Language: Spanish

Hotel Room (Spanish: Cuarto de hotel) is a 1953 Mexican drama film directed by Adolfo Fernández Bustamante and starring Lilia Prado, Roberto Cañedo and Sara Guasch. The film's sets were designed by the art director Edward Fitzgerald.

== Main cast ==
- Lilia Prado as Consuelo Vázquez
- Roberto Cañedo as Miguel Barrera
- Sara Guasch as Sarita
- Quintín Bulnes as Pocaluz
- Guillermo Álvarez Bianchi as Don Eladio
- Carolina Barret as Flora
- Gilberto González as El chueco
- Roberto Y. Palacios as Don Roberto, jefe chino
- Maty Huitrón as Bailarina
- Salvador Quiroz as Hombre robado
- Jaime Jiménez Pons as Ezequiel
- María Gentil Arcos as Panchita
- Joaquín Roche as Agente de policía
- Roberto Meyer as Cliente libidinoso hotel
- Víctor Alcocer as Mariachi

== Bibliography ==
- Emilio García Riera. Breve historia del cine mexicano: primer siglo, 1897-1997. Instituto Mexicano de Cinematografía, 1998.
