= Carlos Savage =

Mexican film editor and actor

- Born: 20 May 1919; Mexico City, Mexico
- Died: 29 September 2000 (aged 81); Mexico City, Mexico
- Occupations: Film editor and actor
- Years active: 1938–2000

Carlos Savage (20 May 1919 – 29 September 2000) was a Mexican film editor and actor. He is also one of the descendants of Mexican President Benito Juarez, who was indigenous. His father, Carlos Savage Juarez, the grandson of President Benito Juarez, was a cadet in Mexico's Heroic Military Academy, where he participated in the famous "Marcha de la Lealtad" or "March of Loyalty" of the Mexican ex-president Francisco I. Madero.

== Selected filmography ==
- Rosalinda (1945)
- The Shack (1945)
- Ramona (1946)
- The Queen of the Tropics (1946)
- The Thief (1947)
- The Private Life of Mark Antony and Cleopatra (1947)
- Adventure in the Night (1948)
- The Game Rooster (1948)
- Marked Cards (1948)
- Jalisco Fair (1948)
- The Last Night (1948)
- A Family Like Many Others (1949)
- The Great Madcap (1949)
- Confessions of a Taxi Driver (1949)
- Angels of the Arrabal (1949)
- A Decent Woman (1950)
- When the Night Ends (1950)
- My Goddaughter's Difficulties (1951)
- Desired (1951)
- The Shrew (1951)
- My Husband (1951)
- The Cry of the Flesh (1951)
- Lost Love (1951)
- Hot Rhumba (1952)
- The Lone Wolf (1952)
- The Justice of the Wolf (1952)
- The Three Happy Compadres (1952)
- The Wolf Returns (1952)
- Acapulco (1952)
- Nobody's Children (1952)
- Snow White (1952)
- Chucho the Mended (1952)
- My Adorable Savage (1952)
- The Minister's Daughter (1952)
- The Beautiful Dreamer (1952)
- The Three Happy Friends (1952)
- Angélica (1952)
- The Vagabond (1953)
- Genius and Figure (1953)
- The Sword of Granada (1953)
- My Three Merry Widows (1953)
- The Spot of the Family (1953)
- Made for Each Other (1953)
- Hotel Room (1953)
- The Strange Passenger (1953)
- The Unknown Mariachi (1953)
- The Viscount of Monte Cristo (1954)
- When I Leave (1954)
- Bluebeard (1955)
- After the Storm (1955)
- The Bandits of Cold River (1956)
- Pablo and Carolina (1957)
- The Boxer (1958)
- A Thousand and One Nights (1958)
- The Castle of the Monsters (1958)
- A Few Drinks (1958)
- Sonatas (1959)
- House of Terror (1960)
- Three Black Angels (1960)
- Alma llanera (1965)

== Bibliography ==
- Mayer, Robert. Eighteenth-Century Fiction on Screen. Cambridge University Press, 2002.
