= Rolando Aguilar =

Mexican film director and screenwriter

- Born: 11 October 1903; San Miguel de Allende, Guanajuato, Mexico
- Died: 3 December 1984 (aged 81); Mexico City, Mexico
- Occupations: Screenwriter, Director
- Years active: 1935 - 1971 (film)

Rolando Aguilar (11 October 1903 – 3 December 1984) was a Mexican film director and screenwriter.

== Selected filmography ==
- Mothers of the World (1936)
- These Men (1937)
- Glorious Nights (1938)
- The Miracle Song (1940)
- ¿Quién te quiere a ti? (1942)
- Rosalinda (1945)
- Adventure in the Night (1948)

== Bibliography ==
- Rogelio Agrasánchez. Guillermo Calles: A Biography of the Actor and Mexican Cinema Pioneer. McFarland, 2010.
