= Fernando Méndez (film director) =

Mexican film director (1908–1966)

- Born: 20 July 1900; Zamora, Michoacan, Mexico
- Died: 17 October 1966 (aged 66); Mexico City, Mexico
- Occupations: Film director, screenwriter
- Years active: 1932–1966 (film)

Fernando Méndez (1908–1966) was a Mexican film director and screenwriter. He was active during the Golden Age of Mexican cinema. In 1957 he switched from melodramas to focus increasingly on horror films.

== Selected filmography ==
- Five Minutes of Love (1941)
- El criollo (1945)
- The Three Garcias (1947)
- A Decent Woman (1950)
- The Shrew (1951)
- My Goddaughter's Difficulties (1951)
- The Minister's Daughter (1952)
- Genius and Figure (1953)
- The Naked Woman (1953)
- Yes, My Love (1953)
- The Spot of the Family (1953)
- There Once Was a Husband (1953)
- Black Ace (1954)
- The Vampire (1957)
- The White Renegade (1960)

== Bibliography ==
- Alfaro, Eduardo de la Vega. Fernando Méndez, 1908-1966. Universidad de Guadalajara, 1995.
- Fischer, Dennis. Horror Film Directors, 1931-1990, Volume 1. McFarland, 1991.
