= Miguel Ángel Ferriz =

Mexican actor

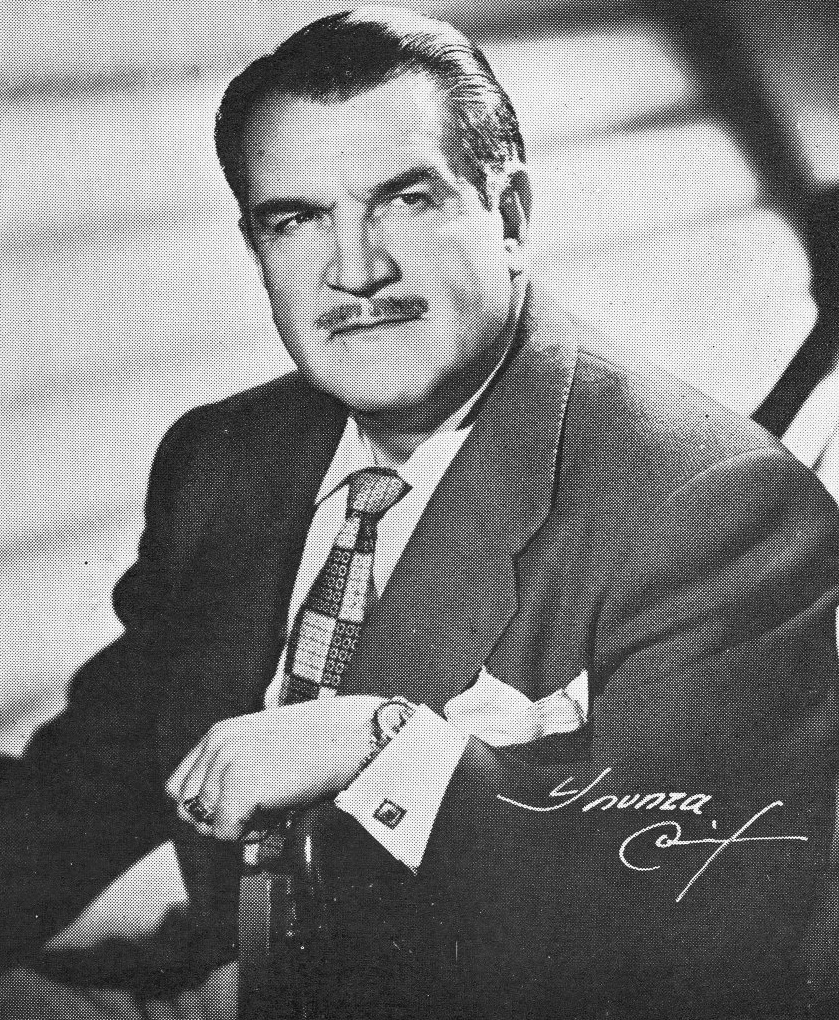
- Miguel Ángel Ferriz in 1954
- Born: Miguel Ángel Ferriz Mendoza; 29 November 1899; Mexico
- Died: 1 January 1967 (aged 67); Mexico City, Mexico
- Occupation: Actor
- Years active: 1918–1969 (film)

Miguel Ángel Ferriz Mendoza (29 November 1899 – 1 January 1967) was a Mexican film actor.

== Selected filmography ==
- The Night of the Mayas (1939)
- I Will Live Again (1940)
- The Rock of Souls (1942)
- The Eternal Secret (1942)
- The Rebel (1943)
- The Spectre of the Bride (1943)
- Lady Windermere's Fan (1944)
- Nana (1944)
- La China poblana (1944 )
- Rosalinda (1945)
- The Hour of Truth (1945)
- Nocturne of Love (1948)
- Red Rain (1950)
- The Man Without a Face (1950)
- Streetwalker (1951)
- The Martyr of Calvary (1952)
- Sister Alegría (1952)
- The Boy and the Fog (1953)
- The Strange Passenger (1953)
- Forbidden Fruit (1953)
- The Sword of Granada (1953)
- Genius and Figure (1953)
- Pain (1953)
- The Price of Living (1954)
- Camelia (1954)
- When I Leave (1954)
- The Murderer X (1955)
- The Bandits of Cold River (1956)
- Pablo and Carolina (1957)
- The Boxer (1958)
- The Life of Agustín Lara (1959)
- My Mother Is Guilty (1960)
- El proceso de las señoritas Vivanco (1961)
- The Fair of the Dove (1963)

== Bibliography ==
- Agrasánchez, Rogelio. Guillermo Calles: A Biography of the Actor and Mexican Cinema Pioneer. McFarland, 2010.
