= José Elías Moreno =

Mexican actor

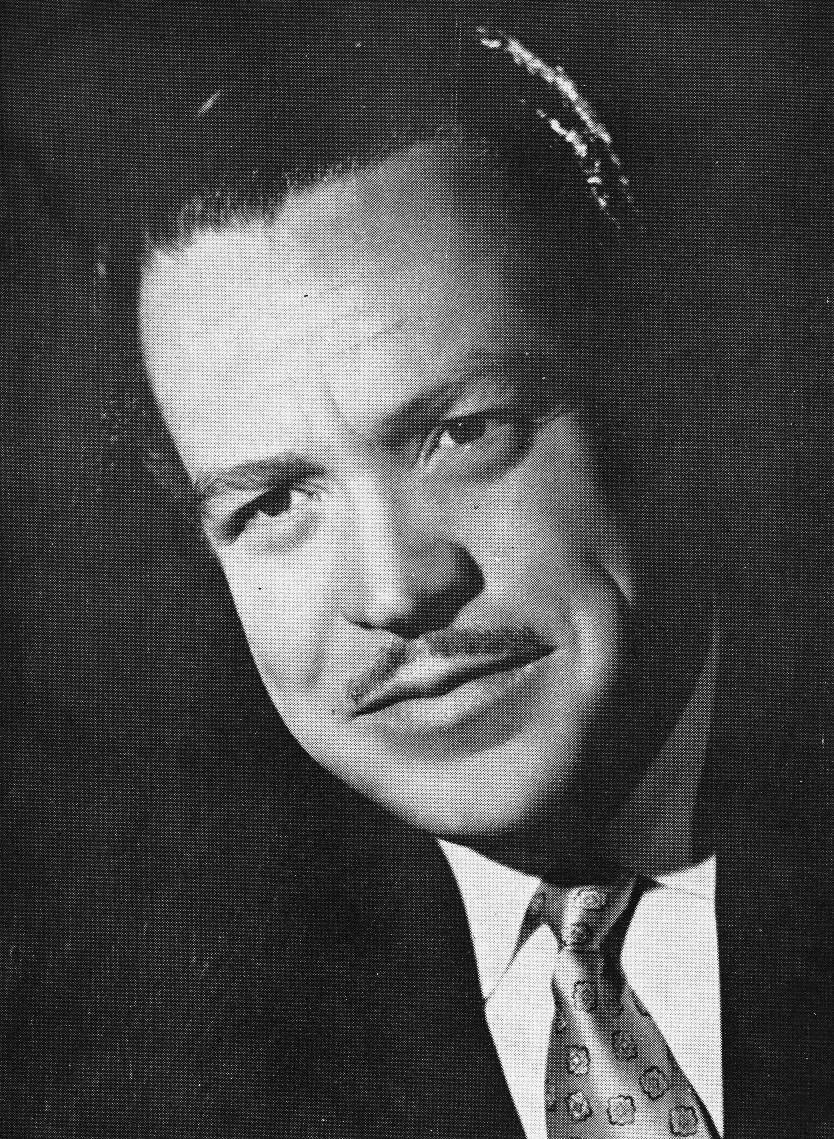
- Moreno in 1954
- Born: José Elías Moreno Padilla; 12 November 1910; Las Palmas, Unión de San Antonio, Jalisco, Mexico
- Died: 5 July 1969 (aged 58); Mexico
- Occupation: Actor
- Years active: 1937-1969
- Spouse(s): Beatriz González de Cossío (m. ?–1969)
- Children: Beatriz Moreno; José Elías Moreno Jr. Ángela Moreno

José Elías Moreno (12 November 1910 – 15 July 1969) was a Mexican character actor. He appeared in more than 180 films between 1937 and 1969. He was from the state of Jalisco. His son of the same name, born in 1956, is also a successful actor in television, cinema, and stage.

== Early life ==
Moreno was born José Elías Moreno Padilla in the small town of Las Palmas, municipality of Unión de San Antonio, at six in the morning on 12 November 1910. His parents were Ignacio Moreno Padilla and María Padilla Hurtado.

== Selected filmography ==
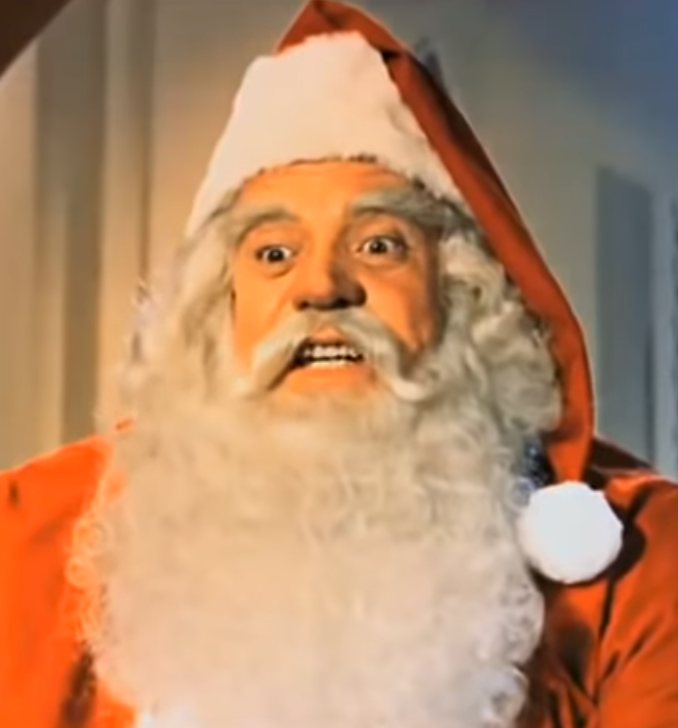
Moreno in Santa Claus (1959)

- Such Is My Country (1937) (uncredited)
- Heads or Tails (1937)
- The 9.15 Express (1941)
- Wild Flower (1943)
- Porfirio Díaz (1944)
- Bugambilia (1945)
- The White Monk (1945)
- Tragic Wedding (1946)
- I Am a Fugitive (1946)
- Symphony of Life (1946)
- Strange Appointment (1947)
- Felipe Was Unfortunate (1947)
- Angels of the Arrabal (1949)
- Midnight (1949)
- The Perez Family (1949) as Toribio Sánchez
- Cuatro contra el mundo (1950) as Comandante Canseco
- The Minister's Daughter (1952)
- The Three Perfect Wives (1953) as Máximo
- Luz en el páramo (1953) as José
- The Magnificent Beast (1953)
- The Spot of the Family (1953)
- De carne somos (1955)
- The Boxer (1958)
- Una cita de amor (1958) as Juez de Acordada
- Santa Claus (1959) as Santa Claus
- Invincible Guns (1960)
- Caperucita y Pulgarcito contra los monstruos (1962) as Ogre
- El padrecito (1964) as Don Silvestre Manzanos
- Viento Negro (film) (1965) as Lorenzo Montes
- La Valentina (1966) as Don Juan Zúñiga
- Rage (1966) as Fortunato
- Seis Días para Morir (La Rabia) (1967)
- The Partisan of Villa (1967)
