= Salvador Quiroz =

Mexican actor (1892–1956)

- Born: November 2, 1892; Cuautla, Morelos, Mexico
- Died: November 23, 1956 (aged 64); Mexico City, Mexico
- Occupation: Actor
- Years active: 1917–1958 (film)

Salvador Quiroz (1892–1956) was a Mexican film actor.

== Selected filmography ==
- Huapango (1938)
- Horse for Horse (1939)
- With Villa's Veterans (1939)
- To the Sound of the Marimba (1941)
- The 9.15 Express (1941)
- When the Stars Travel (1942)
- Alejandra (1942)
- Land of Passions (1943)
- Michael Strogoff (1944)
- Summer Hotel (1944)
- My Memories of Mexico (1944)
- The Black Ace (1944)
- The Disobedient Son (1945)
- Twilight (1945)
- A Day with the Devil (1945)
- The Devourer (1946)
- The Queen of the Tropics (1946)
- The Road to Sacramento (1946)
- The Last Night (1948)
- Confessions of a Taxi Driver (1949)
- Only Veracruz Is Beautiful (1949)
- The Woman I Lost (1949)
- Dos pesos dejada (1949)
- The Black Sheep (1949)
- Love for Love (1950)
- You Shall Not Covet Thy Son's Wife (1950)
- Cabaret Shanghai (1950)
- Wife or Lover (1950)
- Red Rain (1950)
- Duel in the Mountains (1950)
- Veracruz Passion (1950)
- The Doorman (1950)
- A Decent Woman (1950)
- Get Your Sandwiches Here (1951)
- The Lovers (1951)
- Maria Islands (1951)
- Love Was Her Sin (1951)
- What Has That Woman Done to You? (1951)
- My General's Women (1951)
- Good Night, My Love (1951)
- My Goddaughter's Difficulties (1951)
- We Maids (1951)
- Crime and Punishment (1951)
- Women's Prison (1951)
- They Say I'm a Communist (1951)
- Full Speed Ahead (1951)
- The Lie (1952)
- My Wife and the Other One (1952)
- Tropical Delirium (1952)
- The Lone Wolf (1952)
- The Border Man (1952)
- Genius and Figure (1953)
- Hotel Room (1953)
- The Photographer (1953)
- When I Leave (1954)
- A Tailored Gentleman (1954)
- The Medallion Crime (1956)
- Pablo and Carolina (1957)

== Bibliography ==
- Kohner, Pancho. Lupita Tovar The Sweetheart of Mexico. Xlibris Corporation, 2011.
