= Raúl de Anda =

Mexican film director, screenwriter and film producer (1908–1997)

- Born: 1 July 1908; Mexico City, Mexico
- Died: 2 February 1997 (aged 88)
- Other name: Raúl de Anda Gutiérrez
- Occupations: Actor, Writer, Producer, Director
- Years active: 1931–1991 (film)

Raúl de Anda Gutiérrez (1 July 1908 – 2 February 1997), also known as El Charro Negro, was a Mexican actor, screenwriter, film director and producer. His career extended from the early years of Mexican sound cinema through the late twentieth century and included acting in, writing, directing and producing films. He founded Producciones Raúl de Anda and created the El Charro Negro series. His other productions included Champion Without a Crown, Río Escondido and El suavecito. He received the Golden Ariel for his career in 1991.

== Life and career ==
De Anda was born in Mexico City. His father came from a family of charros in the Los Altos region of Jalisco and taught him horsemanship and livestock handling. At the age of 16, De Anda joined Circo 101, an equestrian circus, and toured the Americas for four years. After returning to Mexico in 1930, his experience as a horseman led to work as a film extra. He appeared in Santa, followed by supporting roles in Águilas frente al sol, El prisionero 13 and Vámonos con Pancho Villa. In the last of these, he played Máximo Perea, one of the film's group of revolutionary soldiers.

Over the course of his career, De Anda directed 36 films and produced more than 140. Producciones Raúl de Anda released films by several prominent Mexican directors, including Galindo's Champion Without a Crown, Emilio Fernández's Río Escondido and Fernando Méndez's El suavecito. His productions gradually expanded beyond rural dramas and films about the Mexican Revolution to include urban comedies, crime films, adventure films and Westerns.

De Anda received the Golden Ariel for his career in 1991. His sons Agustín, Raúl Jr., Antonio, Rodolfo and Gilberto also worked in the film industry. De Anda died in Mexico City on 2 February 1997. He was also identified as one of the founders of the Mexican Academy of Cinematographic Arts and Sciences.

== Selected filmography ==
=== Actor ===
- Juan Pistolas (1936)
- La Valentina (1938)

=== Producer ===
- I'm a Real Mexican (1942)
- Red Konga (1943)
- Rosalinda (1945)
- Adventure in the Night (1948)
- The Game Rooster (1948)
- My Goddaughter's Difficulties (1951)
- Acapulco (1952)
- The Lone Wolf (1952)
- The Wolf Returns (1952)
- Genius and Figure (1953)
- The Spot of the Family (1953)

=== Director ===
- With Villa's Veterans (1939)
- The Queen of the Tropics (1946)
- Angels of the Arrabal (1949)
- A Decent Woman (1950)

== Bibliography ==
- Pick, M. Zuzana. Constructing the Image of the Mexican Revolution: Cinema and the Archive. University of Texas Press, 2010.
