= Lilia Michel =

Mexican actress (1926–2011)

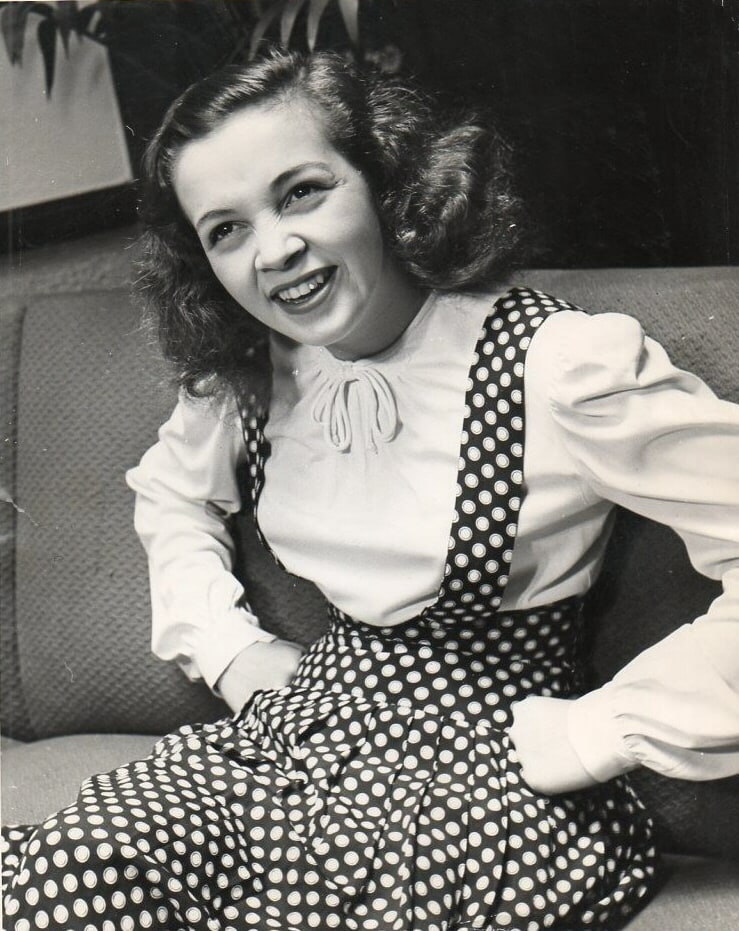
Lilia Michel

Lilia Michel (July 30, 1926 – August 10, 2011) was a Mexican television and film actress most active during the Golden Age of Mexican cinema, earning her the nickname of "the jewel" of the film era.

Michel was born Lilia Fernández Larios on July 30, 1926, in Teapa, Tabasco, Mexico. She became well known for her role in the 1946 Mexican film Dizziness, in which she co-starred María Félix. Michel later switched to television, earning numerous roles in telenovelas, including Aprendiendo a Vivir, María la del Barrio and Rosalía.

Lilia Michel died in Mexico City on August 10, 2011, at the age of 85.

== Filmography ==
=== Films ===
- 1998 Fuera de la ley
- 1982 Una sota y un caballo: Rancho Avándaro
- 1978 Los amantes fríos
- 1977 Fantoche
- 1975 La lucha con la pantera
- 1975 Yo amo, tú amas, nosotros...
- 1973 El amor tiene cara de mujer
- 1973 Eva y Darío
- 1972 La inocente
- 1972 La pequeña señora de Pérez
- 1969 La muñeca perversa
- 1953 Sí, mi vida
- 1953 Había una vez un marido
- 1952 Sígueme, corazón
- 1950 La gota de sangre
- 1946 El pasajero diez mil
- 1946 It's Not Enough to Be a Charro
- 1946 Una virgen moderna
- 1946 Dizziness (Vértigo)
- 1945 The Hour of Truth
- 1945 Corazones de México
- 1945 El jagüey de las ruinas
- 1945 Twilight
- 1945 Un beso en la noche
- 1944 Así son ellas
- 1944 Nana
