= Rafael Baledón =

Mexican actor, director, screenwriter, and producer

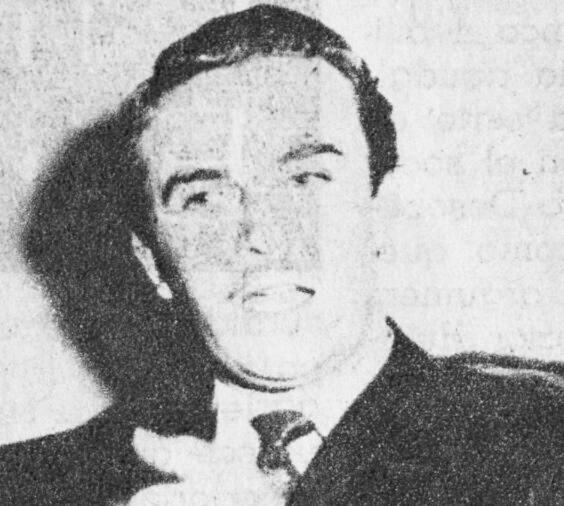
- Rafael Baledón in 1945
- Born: Rafael Baledón Cárdenas; 25 November 1919; Campeche City, Campeche, Mexico
- Died: 6 May 1994 (aged 74); Mexico City, Mexico
- Occupations: Actor; Director; Screenwriter; Producer
- Years active: 1938–1994
- Spouse: Lilia Michel (m. 1943; died 1994)
- Children: 5

Rafael Baledón Cárdenas (25 November 1919 – 6 May 1994) was a Mexican actor, director, screenwriter, and producer of the Golden Age of Mexican cinema. He worked in both film and television.

== Life ==
Rafael Baledón was on 25 November 1919 in Campeche, Mexico. He originally wanted to be a doctor, but he couldn't take the professional exam due to financial reasons. So, he chose acting. He made his debut as an actor in cinema in the late 1930s, working as an extra. It wasn't until 1942 that he had his first leading role, in the movie María Eugenia. The following year, he married actress Lilia Michel and had five children: Rafael, Leonor, Ana Laura, Lourdes and Lilia.

On 6 May 1994, he died of a heart attack.

== Selected filmography ==
=== Actor ===
Year	Title	Role	Notes
1973	El amor tiene cara de mujer	Mariano Gallardo	
1978	Rosalía	Roberto	
1980	Ambición		
1981	Soledad	Don Félix	
1982	Infamia	Lawrence Isabella	
1982	Gabriel y Gabriela	Raúl	
1983	Bianca Vidal	Don Raúl Medina	
1983	Stella	Jim Uptegrove	
1984	Sí, mi amor	Capitán O'Hara	
1986	Ave fénix	Mauro	
1987	Yesenia	Michael Grates	
1988	El Extraño Retorno de Diana Salazar	Ernesto Santelmo	
1990	Mi pequeña Soledad	Don Manuel Fernández	
1994	Prisionera de amor	Braulio Monasterios #1	

=== Director ===
Year	Title	Notes
1979	La llama de tu amor	
1986	Ave fénix	
1987	Yesenia	

=== Film ===
- The 9.15 Express (1941)
- The Count of Monte Cristo (1942)
- Alejandra (1942)
- A Woman's Diary (1944)
- The Stronger Sex (1946)
- Love Makes Them Crazy (1946)
- The Newlywed Wants a House (1948)
- The Fallen Angel (1949)
- A Decent Woman (1950)
- When the Night Ends (1950)
- My Goddaughter's Difficulties (1951)
- La Fuerza Inútil (1972 film)
