= List of Mexican films of 1943 =

This is a list of the films produced in Mexico in 1943, in alphabetical order (see 1943 in film):

== 1943 ==
Title	Director	Cast	Genre	Notes
1943
Adiós juventud	Joaquín Pardavé	Luis Aldás, Manolita Saval, Joaquín Pardavé	Comedy	
Ave sin nido	Chano Urueta	Isabela Corona, Blanca de Castejón, René Cardona	Drama	
Aventuras de Cucuruchito y Pinocho	Carlos Véjar hijo	Francisco Jambrina, Carlos Amador, Paco Astol	Adventure	
Canto a las Américas	Ramón Peón, Ramón Pereda	Paco Miller, Adriana Lamar, Carlos Villarías	Musical comedy	
Cinco fueron escogidos	Agustín P. Delgado, Herbert Kline	Joaquín Pardavé, Julio Villarreal, Andrés Soler	Adventure	
Cristóbal Colón	José Díaz Morales	Julio Villarreal, Consuelo Frank, José Baviera	Historical	
Cuando habla el corazón	Juan José Segura	Pedro Infante, María Luisa Zea, Víctor Manuel Mendoza	Western drama	
De Nueva York a Huipanguillo	Manuel R. Ojeda	Sidney Franklin, Margarita Mora, Mario Martínez Gil	Comedy	
Distinto amanecer	Julio Bracho	Andrea Palma, Pedro Armendáriz, Alberto Galán	Drama	
Divorciadas	Alejandro Galindo	Blanca de Castejón, René Cardona, Milisa Sierra	Drama	
Doña Bárbara	Fernando de Fuentes	María Félix, Julián Soler, María Elena Marqués	Western drama	Based on the Rómulo Gallegos novel
Dulce madre mía	Alfonso Patiño Gómez	Julio Ahuet, Victoria Argota, Alfonso Bedoya	Drama	
El ametralladora	Aurelio Robles Castillo	Pedro Infante, Margarita Mora, Ángel Garasa	Drama	
El circo	Miguel M. Delgado	Cantinflas, Gloria Lynch, Estanislao Schillinsky	Comedy	
El espectro de la novia	René Cardona	Julio Ahuet, David T. Bamberg, Narciso Busquets	Mystery	
El globo de Cantolla	Gilberto Martínez Solares	Mapy Cortés, José Cibrián, Prudencia Grifell	Musical comedy	
El hombre de la máscara de hierro	Marco Aurelio Galindo	José Cibrián, Gloria Lynch, Carlos Villarías	Drama	
El jorobado	Jaime Salvador	Jorge Negrete, Gloria Marín, Adriana Lamar	Drama	
El misterioso señor Marquina	Chano Urueta	René Cardona, Julieta Dosal, Miguel Arenas	Mystery	
El padre Morelos	Miguel Contreras Torres	Domingo Soler, Consuelo Frank, Narciso Busquets	Historical drama	
El peñón de las Ánimas	Miguel Zacarías	Jorge Negrete, María Félix, René Cardona	Drama	
El rebelde	Jaime Salvador	Jorge Negrete, María Elena Marqués, Julio Villarreal	Musical drama	
El rayo del sur	Miguel Contreras Torres	Domingo Soler, Carlos López Moctezuma, Dolores Camarillo	Historical drama	Sequel to El padre Morelos
Espionaje en el golfo	Rolando Aguilar	Julián Soler, Janet Alcoriza, José Baviera	Crime	
Flor silvestre	Emilio Fernández	Dolores del Río, Pedro Armendáriz	Hiatorical	First Dolores del Río Mexican film
Internado para señoritas	Gilberto M. Solares	Mapy Cortés, Emilio Tuero, Katy Jurado	Comedy	
Konga Roja	Alejandro Galindo	Pedro Armendáriz, María Antonieta Pons, Tito Junco	Musical drama	
La feria de las flores	José Benavides hijo	Antonio Badú, María Luisa Zea, Estela Inda	Adventure	
La hija del cielo	Juan José Ortega	Susana Guízar, Tomás Perrín, Alvaro Galvez	Drama	
La posada sangrienta	Fernando A. Rivero	David Silva, Gloria Marín, Miguel Inclán	Comedy	
La razón de la culpa	Juan José Ortega	Blanca de Castejón, Andrés Soler, María Elena Marqués	Romance	
La vírgen roja	Francisco Elías	Manolita Arriola, José Baviera, Anita Blanch	Drama	
Les Misérables	Fernando A. Rivero	Domingo Soler, Manolita Saval, Antonio Bravo	Historical drama	
Lo que sólo el hombre puede sufrir	Juan José Ortega	Andrés Soler, Matilde Palou, Susana Guízar	Drama	
Maravilla del toreo	Raphael J. Sevilla	Conchita Cintrón, Pepe Ortiz, Florencio Castelló	Drama	
María Eugenia	Felipe Gregorio Castillo	María Félix, Manolita Saval, Rafael Baledón	Drama	
Mexicanos, al grito de guerra	Álvaro Gálvez y Fuentes, Ismael Rodríguez	Pedro Infante, Lina Montes, Miguel Inclán	Drama	
Morenita clara	Joselito Rodríguez	Evita Muñoz 'Chachita', Margarita Mora, Arturo Soto Rangel	Family drama	
No matarás	Chano Urueta	Sara García, Emilio Tuero, Carmen Montejo	Drama	debut film of Katy Jurado
Noches de ronda	Ernesto Cortázar	Ramón Armengod, Susana Guízar, María Antonieta Pons	Musical Drama	
Ojos negros	Fernando Soler	Fernando Soler, Manolita Saval, Rafael Baledón	Drama	
¡Qué lindo es Michoacán!	Ismael Rodríguez	Tito Guízar, Gloria Marín, Víctor Manuel Mendoza	Musical comedy	
Resurrección	Gilberto Martínez Solares	Emilio Tuero, Lupita Tovar, Sara García	Drama	
Romeo y Julieta	Miguel M. Delgado	Cantinflas, María Elena Marqués, Ángel Garasa	Comedy	
Santa	Norman Foster	Esther Fernández, Ricardo Montalbán, José Cibrián	Romantic drama	
Tentación	Fernando Soler	Fernando Soler, Gloria Marín, Tomás Perrín	Drama	
Tierra de pasiones	José Benavides hijo	Jorge Negrete, Margarita Mora, José Baviera	Musical drama	
Tormenta en la cumbre	Julián Soler	Julián Soler, Janet Alcoriza, Pituka de Foronda	Drama	
Tres hermanos	José Benavides hijo	Abel Salazar, Julián Soler, David Silva	Drama	
Una carta de amor	Miguel Zacarías	Jorge Negrete, Gloria Marín, Andrés Soler	Drama	
¡Viva mi Desgracia!	Roberto Rodríguez	Pedro Infante, María Antonieta Pons, Queta Lavat	Comedy	
Yolanda	Dudley Murphy	Ricardo Adalid, Crox Alvarado, Fanny Anitúa	Drama	
Arriba las mujeres	Carlos Orellana	Carlos Orellana, Consuelo Guerrero de Luna, Antonio Badú, Pedro Infante		
Qué hombre tan simpático		Carlos Orellana		
