= Las tres viudas de papá =

- Directed by: Miguel Zacarías
- Produced by: Manuel Sereijo
- Starring: Sara García
- Distributed by: Grovas y Cía
- Release date: 3 October 1942
- Country: Mexico
- Language: Spanish

Las tres viudas de papá ("The Three Widows of Father") is a 1942 Mexican comedy film directed by Miguel Zacarías. It stars Sara García. Produced by Manuel Sereijo, it was distributed by Grovas y Cía.

The film was one of three successive Zacarías comedies starring Chato Órtín and Sara García. It was the fourth sequel to Zacarías's Los enredos de papá, and maintained the same quality as the first three. The others were Papá se desenreda and Papá se enreda otra vez.

The film premiered on 3 October 1942 in Mexico City. It was included in the 1959 list of shows censored by the Mexican League of Decency.

== Cast ==
- Carolina Barret
- Antonio R. Frausto
- Sara García
- Carlos López Moctezuma
- Chel López
- Miguel Montemayor
- Leopoldo 'Chato' Ortín
- Blanca Rosa Otero
- Virginia Serret
- Virginia Zurí
