= Father Gets Untangled =

- Directed by: Miguel Zacarías
- Starring: Sara García
- Release date: 11 June 1942
- Country: Mexico
- Language: Spanish

Father Gets Untangled (Spanish Papá se desenreda) is a 1940 Mexican comedy film. It stars Sara García. It was followed by a sequel Father Gets Entangled Again.
