= Alex Phillips (cinematographer) =

Canadian-Mexican cinematographer (1900–1977)

- Born: Alexander Pelepiock; January 11, 1900; Renfrew, Ontario, Canada
- Died: June 14, 1977 (aged 76); Mexico City, Mexico
- Other name: Alec Phillips
- Occupation: Cinematographer
- Years active: 1921–1973
- Spouse: Alicia Bolaños (m. 1933)
- Children: Alex Phillips Jr. Myrna Phillips
- Awards: Ariel Award for Best Cinematography; 1952 En La Palma de Tu Mano; 1955 Untouched

Alexander Phillips (born Alexander Pelepiock; January 11, 1900 – June 14, 1977) was a Canadian-Mexican cinematographer. He worked on over 200 films, most of them during the Golden Age of Mexican Cinema. Throughout his career, he was nominated 14 times for an Ariel Award for Best Cinematography which he won twice for In the Palm of Your Hand (1951) and Untouched (1954).

In 1973, Phillips was recognized with a Golden Ariel from the Mexican Academy of Cinematographic Arts and Sciences for his excellence and contributions to the Mexican film industry.

== Early life ==
Phillips was born in Renfrew, Ontario to Russian parents. In his youth, his family moved to Russia but he returned to Canada since he felt disliked with the Czarist government. He enlisted to the Canadian Army, where he met Mary Pickford, who introduced him to Hollywood since he expressed his interest in becoming an actor.

== Career ==
=== Hollywood ===
After failing to find acting work at Fox and Paramount studios, he was able to find work in the Christie Film Company's camera and editing departments. He received an opportunity when an assistant fell sick and was able to travel to France with the Canadian government. He made his cinematography debut the 1921 Christie production See My Lawyer, billed as 'Alec Phillips'. He shot numerous silent shorts and mid-length films throughout the decade until the 1929 stock market crash led him to be laid off. He then moved to Samuel Goldwyn Productions company, where he furthered his studies of motion picture photography.

=== Mexico ===
Phillips moved to Mexico in 1931 and worked with directors such as Arcady Boytler, Roberto Gavaldón, Julio Bracho, and Luis Buñuel. He worked on some of the earliest Mexican movies such as the silent film Santa (1931) where his work was considered expressionist. He worked on over 240 films in Mexico, including La mujer del puerto (1934), Buñuel's Aventuras de Robinson Crusoe (1952), and Emilio Fernández's La Red (1953). His last film was Arturo Ripstein's El castillo de la pureza (1972).

Along with his contemporary Gabriel Figueroa, Phillips was considered the defining cinematographer of the Golden Age of Mexican Cinema. He won two Ariel Awards for Best Cinematography (out of 14 total nominations), and received the Golden Ariel in 1973.

== Personal life ==
Phillips married to Alicia Bolaños in 1933, and they had two children. Their son, Alex Phillips Jr., became an accomplished cinematographer in his own right, as well as the official state photographer of President Adolfo López Mateos during his term.

=== Death ===
Phillips died in Mexico City on June 14, 1977, at the age of 76.

== Selected filmography ==
- See My Lawyer (1921)
- Hold Your Breath (1924)
- Seven Days (1925)
- The Nervous Wreck (1926)
- Luponini from Chicago (1935)
- Martín Garatuza (1935)
- Come on Ponciano (1937)
- Café Concordia (1939)
- Father's Entanglements (1939)
- I Will Live Again (1940)
- The Eternal Secret (1942)
- Father Gets Entangled Again (1942)
- Father Morelos (1943)
- Lightning in the South (1943)
- Michael Strogoff (1944)
- The White Monk (1945)
- Twilight (1945)
- Pepita Jiménez (1946)
- Everybody's Woman (1946)
- Flor de caña (1948)
- The Game Rooster (1948)
- The Shadow of the Bridge (1948)
- It's a Sin to Be Poor (1950)
- The Little House (1950)
- Desired (1951)
- Sensuality (1951)
- In the Palm of Your Hand (1951)
- The Woman You Want (1952)
- Women Who Work (1953)
- Untouched (1954)
- The Last of the Fast Guns (1958)
- My Mother Is Guilty (1960)
- The Partisan of Villa (1967)
- Traitors of San Angel (1967)
- Farewell to Marriage (1968)
