= Manuel Fontanals =

Spanish-born art director who settled and worked in Mexico

- Born: 26 July 1893; Barcelona, Spain
- Died: 17 September 1972 (aged 79); Mexico City, Mexico
- Other name: Manuel Fontanals Mateu
- Occupation: Art director
- Years active: 1927-1972 (film)

Manuel Fontanals Mateu (1893–1972) was a Spanish art director who settled and worked in Mexico during the Golden Age of Mexican cinema.

== Early years ==
The son of the cabinetmaker Tomàs Fontanals i Sivilla and his mother Rosa Mateu, Manolo 'Manuel' Fontanals began work at his father's workshop in Paris, where he lived with his family until 1914. He returned to Catalonia and settled in Barcelona, studying at the academy of painter Francesc d'Assís Galí, and working with the sculptor Esteve Monegal Prat and the architect Josep Puig i Cadafalch. He enrolled squarely between the shift from the Modernisme movement to the Noucentisme cultural movement. Around that time he decorated the Canaletes Café. In 1917 he began working in scenography for the "Teatro del Arte" of Gregorio Martínez Sierra in Madrid, where he learned from the masters Sigfrido Burmann and Fernando Mignoni Monticelli. In 1919 he traveled to Germany to complete his knowledge of this art and found influences in Expressionism.

When he returned, he combined his work with Martínez Sierra, with the scenography at the Gran Teatre del Liceu, distinguished by his fanciful and original decorations. In 1924 he worked in Milan with the Teatro del Convengno where he collaborated with Gabriele D'Annunzio and staged works by Carlo Goldoni and Luigi Pirandello. In 1925 he went to Paris fulfilling commissions from the theatrical companies of the Odéon, the Opera and the Palace; as well as collaborating with the architect Pascual Bravo Sanfeliú on a hexagonal kiosk of whimsical shapes for the Spanish Pavilion at the International Exhibition of Modern Decorative and Industrial Arts in Paris in 1925. He also collaborated in the preliminaries of the Barcelona International Exhibition of 1929 and in the construction of the Poble Espanyol in Montjuïc (Barcelona), while making sets for the company of Jaume Borràs i Oriol, illustrating books by Gregorio Martínez Sierra and making theater posters. During the 1930s he worked for Jacinto Benavente, Margarita Xirgu, Federico García Lorca and Cipriano Rivas Cheriff. From October 1933 to March 1934 he traveled through South America with the company of Lola Membrives presenting works by García Lorca. In early 1936 he worked in Madrid for Rafael Alberti's Nueva Escena group. Upon learning of the arrest and murder of Federico García Lorca by Federico Franco's insurgents he chose to go into exile.

== Mexican Exile ==
At the end of 1936 Manuel left for Latin America under an assumed name with the theater company of Josefina Díaz Artigas. He first went to Cuba, but in 1938 visited Mexico City for a commission designing the bar at Ciro's. This was the elegant restaurant inside the Reforma Hotel; the first modern hotel in Mexico. The structure was "a truly imposing wooden ellipse... which was at that time called 'the largest bar in the world'." He also decorated other luxury establishments, including the Ambassadeurs restaurant, by the Catalan Dalmau Costa i Vilanova. Through the gatherings at the cafeteria "Hotel Regis" he came into contact with many of the figures of Mexican cinema, who convinced him to stay in Mexico City and work in the film industry. There he met and married the aristocrat Diane de Subervielle, president of the film company Films Mundiales.

He founded his own film decoration company, Escenografía de Manuel Fontanals, with which he achieved great prestige, working with the best actors and directors of Mexican cinema: Dolores del Río, María Félix, Mario Moreno Cantinflas, Emilio Fernández, Roberto Gavaldón, Jaime Salvador, Carlos Velo Cobelas, José Díaz Morales, Ramón Pereda and Ramón Peón. He was a prominent member of the Union of Film Production Workers and the Association of Film Journalists of Mexico. In 1946 he was a co-founder of the Mexican Academy of Motion Picture Arts and Sciences and was awarded the prestigious Ariel Prize in 1947, 1949 and 1972.

A number of films he worked on in Mexico were shown and given awards in his homeland of Spain during his exile, but the government always excised his name from the screen and awards ceremonies.

In later life, while his company mainly did B-movies, Manuel designed a few houses for friends to stay creatively active. After his wife died Manuel burned all his personal documents, house plans, architectural renderings, home decor designs, photographs, set designs and correspondence. Exiled from his home country, he wished to vanish without a trace; though his houses still stand and the hundreds of films he set designed are still seen. After the final film he worked on, The Castle of Purity was completed, he gave the only known interview of his life, published in This Magazine (September 10, 1972). He died one week later. Much of what is known of his life and career was gathered by Rosa Peralta Gilabert from his collaborators and supporting documents for her biography on him.

His work in cinema is extensive and includes 247 sets, or sets and costumes, not counting those made for the theater.

== Works for the Theater ==
- The Princess Who Sucked Her Finger (1917) by Manuel Abril, performed at the Teatro Eslava by Gregorio Martínez Sierra
- The Peacock by Eduard Marquina i Angulo (1923)
- Doña Francisquita by Amadeu Vives (1923)
- Gli innamorati by Carlo Goldoni (1924)
- The Criminal by Alexander Fydor (1925)
- The Mystic by Santiago Rusiñol
- Lo Ferrer de Tall by Frederic Soler (Serafí Pitarra), Les Garses by Ignasi Iglésias, Mossèn Jano and Terra Baixa by Àngel Guimerà; all presented by the company of Jaume Borràs
- Triangle by Gregorio Martinez Sierra, at Theater Beatriz Infant (1929)
- Figurines in the ballet Triana by Isaac Albéniz, for the Spanish ballet company of Antonia Mercè y Luque, La Argentina of the Opera Comique in Paris (1929) with Néstor de la Torre
- Blood Weddings by Federico García Lorca, by the Company of Josefina Diaz Artigas, at the Teatro Beatriz in Madrid (1933)
- The Prodigious Shoemaker (1933) by Federico Garcia Lorca, by the company of Lola Membrives, in the Theater Avenue of Buenos Aires
- Yerma (1934) by Federico García Lorca, by the company of Margarida Xirgu, at the Teatro Español in Madrid
- La dama boba (1935) by Lope de Vega, with the company of Margarida Xirgu, at the Teatre Barcelona
- Doña Rosita la Soltera (1935) by Federico García Lorca, with the company of Margarida Xirgu, at the Teatre Principal in Barcelona
- The Crystal Zoo (1957) of Tennessee Williams, by the Company of Daisy Xirgu, in the Fábregas Theater of Mexico Cinema

== Selected filmography ==
- Bohemians (1936) by Francisco Elías
- Elías Maria (1938) by Chano Urueta
- Lie and You Will Be Happy (1939) by Raphael J. Sevilla
- The Island of the Passion (1941) by Emilio Fernandez
- Two Mexicans in Seville (1942) by Carlos Orellana
- I Danced with Don Porfirio (1942) by Gilberto Martínez Solares
- Land of Passions (1943) by José Benavides
- Les Misérables (1943) by Fernando A. Rivero
- Resurrection (1943) by Gilberto Martínez Solares
- Christopher Columbus (1943) by José Díaz Morales
- Bugambilia (1944) by Emilio Fernández starring Dolores del Río
- The Daughter of the Regiment (1944) by Jaime Salvador
- Summer Hotel (1944) by René Cardona
- The Lady of the Camellias (1944) by Gabriel Soria
- Michael Strogoff (1944) by Miguel M. Delgado
- Saint Francis of Assisi (1944) by Alberto Gout
- The Mulatta of Cordoba (1945) by Adolfo Fernández Bustamante
- I Am a Fugitive (1946) by Miguel M. Delgado
- Love Makes Them Crazy (1946) by Fernando Cortés
- The Associate (1946) by Roberto Gavaldón
- Pepita Jiménez (1946) by Emilio Fernández
- The Kneeling Goddess (1947) by Roberto Gavaldón
- Hidden River (1947) by Emilio Fernández
- Strange Appointment (1947) by Gilberto Martínez Solares
- Voices of Spring (1947) by Jaime Salvador
- The Game Rooster (1948) by Alberto Gout
- The Desire (1948) by Chano Urueta
- Duel in the Mountains (1950) by Emilio Fernández
- It's a Sin to Be Poor (1950) by Fernando A. Rivero
- The Mark of the Skunk (1950) by Gilberto Martínez Solares
- Maria Islands (1951) by Emilio Fernández
- My Wife Is Not Mine (1951) by Fernando Soler
- Sensuality (1951) by Alberto Gout
- From the Can-Can to the Mambo (1951) by Chano Urueta
- The Lovers (1951) by Fernando A. Rivero
- When the Fog Lifts (1952) by Emilio Fernández
- The Night Is Ours (1952) by Fernando A. Rivero
- I Don't Deny My Past (1952) by Alberto Gout
- Forever Yours (1952) by Emilio Fernández
- Seven Women (1953) by Juan Bustillo Oro
- The Three Elenas (1954) by Emilio Gómez Muriel
- Pablo and Carolina (1957) by Mauricio de la Serna
- Music and Money (1958) by Rafael Portillo
- Macario (1960) by Roberto Gavaldón
- Little Town (1962) by Emilio Fernández
- So Loved Our Fathers (1964) by Juan Bustillo Oro
- A Faithful Soldier of Pancho Villa (1966) by Emilio Fernández
- The Law of the Hawk (1966) by Jaime Salvador
- The Castle of Purity (1972) by Arturo Ripstein

== Bibliography ==
- Rosa Peralta Gilabert. Manuel Fontanals, escenógrafo: teatro, cine y exilio. Editorial Fundamentos, 2007.
