= Gregorio López y Fuentes =

Mexican writer (1897–1966)

- Born: 17 November 1897; Zontecomatlán, Veracruz, Mexico
- Died: 11 December 1966 (aged 69); Federal District, Mexico
- Occupations: Writer and journalist
- Writing career
- Notable awards: National Literature Prize (1935)

Gregorio López y Fuentes (Note: In this Mexican name, the surname is López and the second or maternal family name is Fuentes.) (17 November 1897 – 11 December 1966) was a Mexican writer and journalist. He fought against the United States in Veracruz and for the Constitutionalists in the Mexican Revolution, and later held positions in government institutions.

== Life ==
Gregorio López y Fuentes was born in 1897 in Zontecomatlán, a municipality in the Huasteca region of the state of Veracruz. He studied at the Escuela Normal de Maestros and, in 1914, he was sent along with the school's other students to combat the U.S. invasion of Veracruz. His first book, La siringa de cristal, a poetry collection, appeared that same year. He later engaged in the Mexican Revolution, fighting in the Constitutionalist forces of Venustiano Carranza; his experiences in the Revolution would later inform the themes of his writings.

In 1922, he published his second volume of poetry, Claros de selva, and his first novel, El Vagabundo. His most famous novel, El indio, appeared in 1935 and won him the National Literature Prize that year; a film adaptation, starring Pedro Armendáriz and Consuelo Frank, was released in 1939.

He contributed to a number of newspapers and journals, including El Gráfico and El Universal and was the editor of the latter between 1945 and 1952. He worked for the Instituto Mexicano de la Juventud (the government's youth institute) alongside José Vasconcelos and Antonio Caso, and he took a position with the Comisión Nacional de Libros de Texto Gratuitos (the Secretariat of Public Education's publisher of free text books) upon its creation in 1959.

Gregorio López y Fuentes died in Mexico City on 11 December 1966.

== Work ==
López y Fuentes's published works comprised 11 novels, a novella, a volume of short stories, and two collections of poetry.

- La siringa de cristal (verse, 1914)
- El vagabundo (novel, 1922)
- Claros de selva (verse, 1922)
- El alma del poblacho (novel, 1924)
- Campamento (novel, 1931)
- Tierra (novel, 1932)
- ¡Mi general! (novel, 1934)
- El indio (novel, 1935)
- Arrieros (novel, 1937)
- Huasteca (novel, 1939)
- Cuentos campesinos de México (short stories, 1940)
- Acomodaticio (novel, 1943)
- Los peregrinos inmóviles (novel, 1944)
- Entresuelo (novel, 1948)
- Milpa, potrero y monte (novel, 1951)

A number of his books have been translated into English and into German and Czech.

== Legacy ==
In 1980, the municipality of Zontecomatlán was renamed Zontecomatlán de López y Fuentes in his honour.
