= La Virgen morena =

- Directed by: Gabriel Soria
- Produced by: Gabriel Soria, Alberto Santander, and Alejandro A. Abularach
- Release date: 1942
- Country: Mexico
- Language: Spanish

La Virgen morena (lit. "The Dark Virgin") is a 1942 Mexican drama film directed by Gabriel Soria.

== Cast ==
- José Luis Jiménez
- Amparo Goríbar as the Virgen de Guadalupe
- Antonio Bravo
- Arturo Soto Rangel
- Agustín Sen
- Luis Alcoriza
- Aurora Cortés
- Abel Salazar
- Tito Junco
- María Luisa Zea
- Francisco Llopis
- Luis Mussot
- Alfonso Bedoya
- Carolina Barret
- Lupe Inclán
