= The Escape (1944 film) =

1944 film

- Directed by: Norman Foster
- Written by: Guy de Maupassant (short story: Boule de suif); Betty Cromwell; Norman Foster
- Produced by: José Luis Calderon
- Starring: Esther Fernandez; Ricardo Montalbán; Carlos Orellana
- Cinematography: Gabriel Figueroa
- Edited by: Charles L. Kimball
- Music by: Manuel Esperón
- Production company: Producciones México
- Release date: 5 July 1944
- Running time: 90 minutes
- Country: Mexico
- Language: Spanish

The Escape (Spanish: La fuga) is a 1944 Mexican historical adventure film directed by Norman Foster and starring Esther Fernandez, Ricardo Montalbán, and Carlos Orellana. It is based on the 1880 Guy de Maupassant short story Boule de suif. The sets were designed by the art director José Rodríguez Granada.

The film is set during the French Intervention in Mexico. As the Republican forces of Benito Juarez close in on Mexico City, a group of pro-Imperial supporters flee on a stagecoach to the port city of Veracruz. Following the plot of the Maupassant story, the French lieutenant (Montalbán) demands sex from one of the passengers, a young Mexican prostitute (Fernández), in exchange for allowing the stagecoach to continue its journey. He tries to court her while her fellow passengers pressure her to accept. The ending of the film departs from the Maupassant story and makes the leads fall in love to form a tragic romantic couple.

The film reunited Esther Fernández and Ricardo Montalbán after the critical and commercial success of Santa (Norman Foster, 1943), another period literary adaptation in which Fernández starred as a prostitute. Some sources mistakenly claim that Fernández's success in The Escape got her a contract from the Hollywood studio Paramount Pictures. In fact, The Escape was not as successful as Santa and Fernández had already been under contract at Paramount in the early 1940s, though she didn't make any movies. Paramount reportedly rehired her to co-star in Two Years Before the Mast based on old screen tests, not her performance in The Escape.

== Cast ==
- Esther Fernández as Maria Ines Flores
- Ricardo Montalbán as Teniente
- Carlos Orellana as Neftali
- Estela Inda as Condesa de la cadena
- Emma Roldán as Sra. Galindo
- Antonio Bravo as Conde de la cadena
- Miguel Inclán as Miguel
- Antonio R. Frausto as Baldomero
- Eugenia Galindo as Josefa
- Sally Blane as Mrs. Garland
- Manuel Arvide as Militar Frances
- Ángel T. Sala as Coronel Frances
- Fernando Rosales
- Edmundo Espino as Campesino

== Bibliography ==
- Waldman, Harry (1996). Slide, Anthony (ed.). Hollywood and the Foreign Touch: A Dictionary of Foreign Filmmakers and Their Films from America, 1910–1995. Lanham, MD: Scarecrow Press. ISBN 978-0-8108-3192-6.
