= El Ametralladora =

1943 film directed by Aurelio Robles Castillo

- Directed by: Aurelio Robles Castillo; Jaime Luis Contreras
- Written by: Aurelio Robles Castillo
- Starring: Pedro Infante; Margarita Mora; Ángel Garasa
- Cinematography: Jack Draper
- Edited by: Mario del Rio
- Music by: Armando Rosales; Aurelio Robles Castillo; Nicandro Castillo; Margarita Mora; Ángel Garasa
- Release date: 1943
- Running time: 98 Minutes
- Country: Mexico
- Language: Spanish

El Ametralladora (English: "The machine gun") is a 1943 film directed by Aurelio Robles Castillo and Jaime Luis Contreras, and starring Pedro Infante, Margarita Mora and Ángel Garasa. It is the sequel to the movie Ay, Jalisco...no te rajes!, starring Jorge Negrete as the character Salvador Pérez Gómez 'El Ametralladora', and based on the book Ay, Jalisco...no te rajes! written by Robles Castillo.

It was filmed in several locations in Jalisco including Lake Chapala, Atotonilco, Guadalajara and Tepatitlán and distributed by Jalisco Films, S.A. The film was dedicated to Carlos López who played Chaflán in the prequel. It was released September 28, 1943 at the Theresa Cinema (Cine Teresa).

== Songs ==
- ¡Ay, Jalisco, no te rajes!
- Ay qué chispo by Arturo Robles Castillo
- Ruégale a Dios by Arturo Robles Castillo
- El corrido de Chaflán by Arturo Robles Castillo, Nicandro Castillo
- Arullo de quimera by Chucho Monge

== Plot ==
The film takes place during the turbulent Mexican Revolution, Salvador has just won the race for Carmen Sala's hand in marriage, held by General Carvajal who is Felipe's father. The agreement was that if Felipe won the race he would marry Carmen and the general would not force her father, Mr. Salas, to sell his property to him. But if Salvador won the race, he would have the right to marry Carmen, and the general would let the property matter go.

Salvador, Carmen, Chachita and Chaflán leave for Guadalajara to start their new life after the big race. But there is still much commotion as it is believed that Malasuerte has been shot to death by General Carvajal, who died in the skirmish following the race. Rumor has it that Salvador is the infamous Ametralladora who had recently travelled to Guadalajara to exact justice for the murders of his mother and father several years before when he was 12 years old. In response to the death of the general, several men pursue Salvadore, but Chaflán tells them to go on ahead, so that Salvador can get Carmen and Chachita safely away. Chaflán is killed in the gunfight that follows.

Malasuerte is brought into Radilla's cantina and laid to rest on a bed, several men come to pay their respects but are asked to leave after speaking bad of the dead. Pascualito arrives to inform Radilla that Chaflán was ambushed shortly after leaving the race and is believed to be dead, however Pascualito discovers that Malasuerte is not dead after all. Salvador gives his guns to Carmen and promises to put his violent past behind him. Meanwhile, Felipe is now the sole heir to his father's estate, and he informs Mr. Salas that he would like to marry Carmen in order to settle Salas' debts. Salas asks for a few days to find and convince her, which Felipe consents to.

Salvador, Carmen and Chachita take refuge in Atotonilco with Carmen's aunt and her brother who is a priest. The next day they discover that Chaflán is dead, they go to the fair to buy flowers for his grave. Salvador remembers his promise to Carmen, and agrees not to pursue Chaflán's killers. Mr. Salas agrees to let Carmen marry Salvador after fifteen days, however Salvador has to demonstrate that he can be an honorable man without fighting or killing, or she will have to marry Felipe. Salas tells Felipe of the agreement, who in turn pays some farm workers to go after Salvador.

Malasuerte tells Salvador that Felipe's men had killed Radilla, Salvador vows to pay back Felipe. Carmen begs Salvador to flee and save his life, but then gives him his guns and asks him to defend his life and avenge the death of Radilla and Chaflán. Later, Felipe's men catch up with Salvador, Malasuerte and Pascualito who kill all but one of Felipe's men who tells them that Felipe and Carmen are getting married that day. Salvador and the other two men question the farm workers who admit that they and Felipe destroyed the cantina and that it was Felipe who killed Radilla. All of the men go to the church where the wedding is taking place, one of the farm workers accuses Felipe of killing Radilla, but he is killed by Felipe. Salvador shoots back at Felipe in self defense and Felipe is killed. Salvador then asks the priest to marry he and Carmen but the priest tells him he's crazy and that Carmen just got married. Salvador tells him that she is now a widow and can be married.

== Cast ==
- Pedro Infante as Salvador Pérez Gómez 'El Ametralladora' (The machine gun)
- Margarita Mora as Carmen Salas
- Ángel Garasa as Mala Suerte
- Víctor Manuel Mendoza as Felipe Carvajal
- Arturo Soto Rangel as Mr. Salas
- Alfredo Varela Jr. as Pascualito
- Antonio Bravo as Radilla
- Manuel Arvide as the priest
- Eugenia Galindo as Celestina
- Noemí Beltrán as Chachita
- Manuel Noriega Ruiz as the inspector
- José Torvay as the cockfighter
- Francisco Pando as the grocery store owner
- Roberto Cañedo
- Los Plateados
- Mariachi Vargas
- Las Tres Morenas
