= El ahijado de la muerte =

El Ahijado de la Muerte
- Directed by: Norman Foster
- Written by: Janet Alcoriza, Luis Alcoriza, Norman Foster from a story by Jacob Grimm and Wilhelm Grimm
- Produced by: Óscar Dancigers
- Starring: Jorge Negrete, Rita Conde, Leopoldo Ortín, Emma Roldán, Tito Junco
- Cinematography: Jack Draper
- Edited by: George Crone
- Music by: Manuel Esperón
- Release date: 1946
- Running time: 82 minutes
- Country: Mexico
- Language: Spanish

El ahijado de la muerte ("The Godson of Death") is a 1946 Mexican film. It was the first film to be written by Luis Alcoriza, co-written with his wife Janet Alcoriza, loosely based on the story by the brothers Grimm.

== Plot ==
Dionisio, a worker in a mexican hacienda, is looking for someone who can become a godparent for his newborn son, Diego. While being drunk, he goes to the cemetery, where Death appears before him and offers to become his son's Godmother.

Years go by, and Diego is now a young man. Having become the foreman of the Hacienda, he lives a good life. However, a series of events force him to become a bandit, rebelling against his former childhood friend, who is now his master and the owner of the hacienda.

== Cast ==
Main Cast

- Jorge Negrete, as Pedro/el Ahijado (the Godson)
- Rita Conde, as Marina
- Leopoldo Ortín, as Dionisio
- Tito Junco, as Carmelo
- Alejandro Ciangherotti, as Don Julio
- Emma Roldán, as La Muerte (Death)

Other appearances:

- Francisco Jambrina
- Manuel Dondé
- Juan García
- Enrique Cancino
- Carlos Múzquiz
- José Elías Moreno
- Raúl Guerrero
- Ceferino Silva
- Chel López
- Lupe Inclán
- Aurora Walker
- José Muñoz
- Leonor Gómez
- Daniel Pastor
- Ignacio Peón (uncredited)
- Enriqueta Reza (uncredited)
