= The Circus (1943 film) =

- Directed by: Miguel M. Delgado
- Written by: Jaime Salvador; Miguel M. Delgado
- Produced by: Jacques Gelman; Santiago Reachi
- Starring: Mario Moreno «Cantinflas»; Gloria Lynch
- Cinematography: Gabriel Figueroa
- Edited by: Jorge Busto
- Music by: Manuel Esperón
- Production company: Posa Films
- Release date: 11 March 1943
- Running time: 90 minutes
- Country: Mexico
- Language: Spanish

The Circus (Spanish: El circo) is a 1943 Mexican comedy film directed by Miguel M. Delgado and starring Mario Moreno «Cantinflas» and Gloria Lynch.

== Cast ==
- Mario Moreno as Cantinflas
- Gloria Lynch as Rosalinda
- Estanislao Shilinsky as Maestro de ceremonias
- Eduardo Arozamena as Coronel
- Ángel T. Sala as Don Elías
- Rafael Burglete
- Tito Novaro as Ricardo
- Leonid Kinskey as Cliente ruso zapatero
- Julio Ahuet
- Arcady Boytler
- Manuel Dondé
- Pedro Elviro
- Edmundo Espino
- Juan García
- Ana María Hernández as Espectadora circo
- Alfonso Jiménez
- Guillermo Meneses
- Roberto Y. Palacios as Cliente zapatero
- Ignacio Peón as Espectador circo
- Charles Rooner as Mr. Arnold

== Bibliography ==
- Eric Zolov. Iconic Mexico: An Encyclopedia from Acapulco to Zócalo. ABC-CLIO, 2015.
