= La feria de las flores =

1943 film directed by José Benavides

- Directed by: José Benavides, Jr; Felipe Palomino
- Written by: Rafael M Saavedra; José Benavides, Jr
- Produced by: Luis Sánchez Tello; A. Sánchez Barraza
- Starring: Antonio Badú; María Luisa Zea; Stella Inda
- Cinematography: Jack Draper
- Edited by: José W. Bustos
- Music by: Manuel Esperón; Chucho Monge
- Distributed by: Ixtla Films
- Release date: 1943
- Running time: 101 Minutes
- Country: Mexico
- Language: Spanish

La feria de las flores (English: "The flower fair") is a 1943 film directed by José Benavides, Jr. based on a story by Rafael M Saavedra and starring Antonio Badú, María Luisa Zea and Stella Inda. Pedro Infante also appears in the film in one of his first starring roles as Rosendo, Valentín's friend.

This film is considered Infante's first professional starring role, although it is his second starring role and his third full-length feature film. His first film appearance was in El Organillero (short) in 1939. It is also the first film that Infante appears on horseback, not just riding but singing as well. And since he did not have the opportunity to ride horseback previously, he received charreria (specific type of horsemanship) lessons from Don Miguel Lara Guerrero each morning at 7am for the making of the film.

== Songs ==
- La feria de las flores (The flower fair) by Chucho Monge as (as Jesus Monge)
- A ver que pasa (Let's see what happens) by Chucho Monge

== Cast ==
- Antonio Badú as Valentín Mancera
- María Luisa Zea as Sanjuana González
- Stella Inda as Virginia (as Estela Inda)
- Luis G. Barreiro as Doctor Ronzoña
- Fernando Fernández as Cipriano
- Pedro Infante as Rosendo, friend of Valentín
- Víctor Junco as Comandente
- Tito Junco as Pablo
- Ángel T. Sala as Don Dionisio Catalán
- Salvador Quiroz as Don Ausencio, chief of police
- Adelita Herrera as Asunción
- Trío Calaveras
