= The Queen of the River =

1939 film

- Directed by: René Cardona
- Produced by: Lorenzo Barcelata; Ernesto Cortázar
- Starring: Domingo Soler; Pedro Armendáriz; Gloria Morel
- Music by: Lorenzo Barcelata
- Distributed by: Cinexport Distributing
- Release date: 12 October 1939
- Running time: 90 minutes
- Country: Mexico
- Language: Spanish

The Queen of the River (Spanish: La reina del río) is a 1939 Mexican drama film directed by René Cardona and starring Domingo Soler, Pedro Armendáriz and Gloria Morel. Location shooting took place around Tampico in Tamaulipas.

== Cast ==
- Domingo Soler as Pescador maduro
- Pedro Armendáriz as Pescador joven
- Rafael Falcón as Pescador cantante
- Gloria Morel as La joven
- Susana Guízar as La nativa
- Ernesto Cortázar as Tartamudo
- Lorenzo Barcelata
- Carmen Lozano

== Bibliography ==
- Amador, María Luisa. Cartelera cinematográfica, 1930-1939. Filmoteca, UNAM, 1980.
- Richard, Alfred. Censorship and Hollywood's Hispanic image: an interpretive filmography, 1936-1955. Greenwood Press, 1993.
