= The White Monk =

1945 film by Julio Bracho

- Directed by: Julio Bracho
- Written by: Eduardo Marquina (play); Xavier Villaurrutia; Jesús Cárdenas; Julio Bracho
- Starring: María Félix; Tomás Perrín; Julio Villarreal
- Cinematography: Alex Phillips
- Edited by: Jorge Bustos
- Music by: Raúl Lavista
- Production company: Clasa Films Mundiales
- Release date: 6 October 1945
- Running time: 112 minutes
- Country: Mexico
- Language: Spanish

The White Monk (Spanish:El monje blanco) is a 1945 Mexican historical drama film directed and co-written by Julio Bracho and starring María Félix, Tomás Perrín and Julio Villarreal. The film's sets were designed by the art director Jorge Fernandez.

It is set in Italy in the thirteenth century.

== Cast ==
- María Félix as Gálata Orsina
- Tomás Perrín as Conde Hugo del Saso / Fray Paracleto
- Julio Villarreal as Sacerdote
- Paco Fuentes as Capolupo
- Consuelo Guerrero de Luna as Condesa Próspera Huberta
- María Douglas as Mina Amanda
- José Pidal as Fray Matías
- Manuel Noriega
- Fanny Schiller
- Felipe Montoya as Marco Leone
- Ángel T. Sala as Montero
- José Elías Moreno
- Ernesto Alonso as Fray Can
- Marta Elba as Anabella
- Alejandro Cobo as Bertone
- Manolo Fábregas as Piero
- María Gentil Arcos as Peregrina
- Paco Martinez as Peregrino

== Bibliography ==
- Paco Ignacio Taibo. María Félix: 47 pasos por el cine. Bruguera, 2008.
