= While Mexico Sleeps =

1938 film

- Directed by: Alejandro Galindo
- Written by: Alejandro Galindo
- Starring: Arturo de Córdova; Gloria Morel; Miguel Arenas; Carlos López y Valles
- Cinematography: Gabriel Figueroa
- Edited by: Jorge Bustos; Emilio Gómez Muriel
- Music by: Manuel Esperón
- Production company: Iracheta y Elvira
- Release date: 28 October 1938
- Running time: 97 minutes
- Country: Mexico
- Language: Spanish

While Mexico Sleeps (Spanish:Mientras México duerme) is a 1938 Mexican crime film directed by Alejandro Galindo and starring Arturo de Córdova, Gloria Morel and Miguel Arenas. The film's sets were designed by the art director Jorge Fernandez.

== Cast ==
- Arturo de Córdova as Federico La Cierva
- Gloria Morel as Margarita
- Miguel Arenas as Méndez
- Alberto Martí as Jefe de policia
- Gaby Macias as Cantante
- Ramón Vallarino as Roberto
- Carlos López
- Gilberto González as Germán
- Roberto Banquells
- Armando Velasco
- Víctor Manuel Mendoza
- Raúl Guerrero
- Alfonso Bedoya
- Arturo Turich
- Elena Ureña
- Emma Duval
- Armando Soto La Marina

== Bibliography ==
- Spicer, Andrew. Historical Dictionary of Film Noir. Scarecrow Press, 2010.
