= Café Concordia =

1939 film

- Directed by: Alberto Gout
- Written by: Sabino Camus; Roberto Gavaldón; Alberto Gout; Pedro Zapiain
- Produced by: Pedro Zapiain
- Starring: Janet Alcoriza; David Silva; Tomás Perrín
- Cinematography: Alex Phillips
- Edited by: Emilio Gómez Muriel
- Production company: German Camus y Compania
- Distributed by: Clasa Films Mundiales
- Release date: 10 November 1939
- Running time: 81 minutes
- Country: Mexico
- Language: Spanish

Café Concordia is a 1939 Mexican historical drama film directed by Alberto Gout and starring Janet Alcoriza, David Silva and Tomás Perrín.

== Cast ==
- Janet Alcoriza as Raquel
- David Silva as Julián
- Tomás Perrín as Ernesto de la Fuente
- Mimí Derba as Doña Laura
- Matilde Corell as Rita
- Josefina Escobedo as Gabriela
- Raúl Guerrero as Paco - mesero
- Agustín Isunza as Pepe - mesero
- Julio Villarreal as don Antonio
- Víctor Junco
- Julia Alonso
- Hernán Vera

== Bibliography ==
- Alfaro, Eduardo de la Vega. Alberto Gout (1907-1966). Cineteca Nacional, 1988.
- Richard, Alfred. Censorship and Hollywood's Hispanic image: an interpretive filmography, 1936-1955. Greenwood Press, 1993.
