= La honradez es un estorbo =

- Directed by: Juan Bustillo Oro
- Written by: Juan Bustillo Oro, Antonio Helu
- Starring: Sara García
- Release date: 1937
- Country: Mexico
- Language: Spanish

La honradez es un estorbo ("Honesty is a Hindrance") is a 1937 Mexican film. It stars Sara García.

== Cast ==
- Leopoldo Ortín
- Gloria Morel
- Luis G. Barreiro
- Sara García
- Adela Jaloma
- Joaquín Coss
- Manuel Noriega
