= Strange Appointment =

1947 film

- Directed by: Gilberto Martínez Solares
- Written by: Gilberto Martínez Solares
- Produced by: José Ramón Huerta
- Starring: Esther Fernández; Luis Aldás; Jorge Reyes
- Cinematography: Agustín Martínez Solares
- Edited by: Charles L. Kimball
- Music by: Luis Hernández Bretón
- Production company: Aristo Films
- Distributed by: Panamerican Films
- Release date: 30 October 1947
- Running time: 88 minutes
- Country: Mexico
- Language: Spanish

Strange Appointment (Spanish: Extraña cita) is a 1947 Mexican mystery thriller film directed by Gilberto Martínez Solares and starring Esther Fernández, Luis Aldás and Jorge Reyes. The film's sets were designed by the art director Manuel Fontanals.

== Synopsis ==
After her father's death, María Eugenia is pressured by Don Remigio Pérez who her father owed debts to, to marry her. Instead her kindly uncle Roberto de los Ríos pays off her debts and she goes to live with him at his country estate with his two twin nephews Carlos and Leonardo. However she faces an attempt to murder her to secure her uncle's fortune.

== Cast ==
- Esther Fernández as María Eugenia
- Luis Aldás as Carlos / Leonardo
- Jorge Reyes as Ángel Custodio
- Fernando Soto as Mantequilla
- Rafael Alcayde as Roberto de los Ríos
- Conchita Carracedo as Carmen
- Nicolás Rodríguez as Don Remigio Pérez
- Antonio Bravo as Don Juan Guerra
- José Elías Moreno as Esteban
- Enriqueta Reza as Doña Chona
- José Torvay as Comisario
- Juan García as Asistente Comisario
- Irma Torres as Mariquita
- Juan Orraca as Señor de la Maza
- Lupe del Castillo as Felisa
- Humberto Rodríguez as Secretario
- Daniel Arroyo as Señor Velasco
- Ramón Sánchez as Esbirro de Esteban

== Bibliography ==
- Riera, Emilio García. Historia documental del cine mexicano: 1946-1948. Universidad de Guadalajara, 1992
- Wilt, David E. The Mexican Filmography, 1916 through 2001. McFarland, 2024.
