= El gran premio =

- Starring: Sara García
- Release date: 1958
- Running time: 87 minute
- Country: Mexico
- Language: Spanish

El gran premio ("The Grand Prize") is a 1958 Mexican film. It stars Sara García.

== Plot ==
Cholita lives in an old people's home that is about to be closed for its lack of funds. To avoid it Cholita decides to participate in a famous TV show in which she could win a lot of money.

== Cast ==
- Sara García - Soledad Fuentes Lagos 'Cholita'
- Irma Dorantes - Hermana Piedad
- Ángel Infante - Fernando González
- Julio Villarreal - Don Rubén Dario López de Urquijo
- Mercedes Soler - Madre superiora
- María Gentil Arcos - Anciana en asilo
- Lupe Carriles - Francisca
- Julián García
