= Alejandro Cobo =

Spanish-Mexican actor

- Born: Alejandro Cobo Higuera; 1904; Liérganes, Cantabria, Spain
- Died: 21 March 1950 (aged 45–46); Mexico City, Mexico
- Occupation: Actor

Alejandro Cobo Higuera (1904 – 21 March 1950) was a Spanish-Mexican actor. He worked in the Golden Age of Mexican cinema, in films such as Virgen de medianoche (1942), The Eternal Secret (1942), The White Monk (1945), Hermoso ideal (1948), The Genius (1948) and The Magician (1949). He was the stepfather of Roberto Cobo.

== Selected filmography ==
- The 9.15 Express (1941)
- The Eternal Secret (1942)
- I'm a Real Mexican (1942)
- María Eugenia (1943)
- Christopher Columbus (1943)
- Resurrection (1943)
- Lightning in the South (1943)
- El Misterioso señor Marquina (1943)
- El corsario negro (1944)
- The Lady of the Camellias (1944)
- The White Monk (1945)
- Arsène Lupin (1947)
- Ecija's Seven Children (1947)
- The Genius (1948)
- Beau Ideal (1948)
- The Magician (1949)
- The Bewitched House (1949)
- The Devil Is a Woman (1950)
- The King of the Neighborhood (1950)
- Red Rain (1950)

== Bibliography ==
- Aviña, Rafael. David Silva: un campeón de mil rostros. UNAM, 2007. ISBN 978-9-7032-3129-4
- Ibarra, Jesús. Los Bracho: tres generaciones de cine mexicano. UNAM, 2006. ISBN 978-9-7032-3074-7
- García Riera, Emilio. Historia documental del cine mexicano, Volumen 18 1997. Universidad de Guadalajara, 1997. ISBN 978-9-6889-5662-5
