= Martín Garatuza =

Martín Garatuza (born c. 1601, Puebla, Mexico) was a famous trickster whose frauds and escapes became legendary in colonial New Spain and whose name has passed into Spanish language, folklore and literature.

Garatuza, whose real name was Martín de Villavicencio Salazar, came to the attention of the authorities in Puebla in 1640 for posing as a priest without having been ordained. He played this role with great pomp, offering his hand to be kissed, hearing confessions, and saying mass. In this way he travelled through much of New Spain, gaining his living fraudulently.

In 1642 he was arrested in Nejapa, Oaxaca by the Inquisition, accused of saying mass without being ordained. He managed to escape, but a few months later he turned himself in to the Inquisition in Mexico City. He soon talked his way out of detention, being granted a leave of 40 days to return to Puebla for health reasons. Naturally, he used this opportunity to escape again and continue his escapades.

He was apprehended a third time and condemned to appear in an auto de fe "as a penitent, with a green candle in his hands, a rope about his neck, a white hood on his head". He was to receive 200 lashes and was sentenced to the galleys of Terrenate for five years without pay. The auto de fe was held March 30, 1648 in Mexico City. Thereafter he left New Spain to complete his sentence and was never heard from again.

The expression "¿En qué pararán estas misas, Garatuza?" (What will end these masses, Garatuza?) has passed into the language. It refers to a difficult position a person finds himself in through the consequences of his own actions. The word gartusa (note the variant spelling) has several meanings as a noun. There is a card game of that name. The word can also mean the use of cajolery and flattery to gain one's ends, and it is the name of a feint in fencing.

Vicente Riva Palacio (1832–96) wrote the novel Martín Gartuza. There is also a Mexican movie based on this novel (1935). In 1986 a Mexican telenovela of the same name was broadcast.

He is remembered in Mexico as a humorous character, one who lived by his wits but did not use violence.
