= Martín Garatuza (film) =

1935 film

- Directed by: Gabriel Soria
- Written by: Pablo Prida; Gabriel Soria
- Based on: Martín Garatuza by Vicente Riva Palacio
- Produced by: Antonio Prida Santacilia
- Starring: Leopoldo 'Chato' Ortín; Josefina Escobedo; Juan José Martínez Casado; Sofía Álvarez
- Cinematography: Alex Phillips
- Edited by: Aniceto Ortega
- Music by: Manuel Castro Padilla
- Production company: Águila Films
- Release date: 22 May 1935
- Running time: 83 minutes
- Country: Mexico
- Language: Spanish

Martín Garatuza is a 1935 Mexican historical drama film directed by Gabriel Soria and starring Leopoldo 'Chato' Ortín, Josefina Escobedo, Juan José Martínez Casado and Sofía Álvarez. It is based on the novel of the same title by Vicente Riva Palacio, inspired by the story of Martín Garatuza. The film's sets were designed by the art director Francisco Gómez Palacio.

== Cast ==
- Leopoldo 'Chato' Ortín as Martin Garatuza
- Josefina Escobedo as Esperanza
- Juan José Martínez Casado as Leonel de Salazar
- Sofía Álvarez as Carmen Valtierra
- Mimí Derba as Doña Juana de Carvajal
- Alberto Martí as Don Alonso de Rivera
- Paco Martínez as Don Pedro de Mejía
- Conchita Gentil Arcos as Doña Catalina
- Miguel Wimer as Baltasar de Salmerón
- Luis G. Barreiro as Notario
- Víctor Torres as Negro Teodoro
- Emilio Fernández as Unknown role
- María Luisa Zea as Unknown role

== Bibliography ==
- Hershfield, Joanne; Maciel, David R. Mexico's Cinema: A Century of Film and Filmmakers. Rowman & Littlefield Publishers, 1999.
- Richard, Charles Alfred. The Hispanic Image on the Silver Screen: An Interpretive Filmography from Silents Into Sound, 1898-1935. Bloomsbury Academic, 1992.
