= Poppy of the Road =

1937 film

- Directed by: Juan Bustillo Oro; Antonio Guzmán Aguilera
- Written by: Juan Bustillo Oro; Antonio Guzmán Aguilera
- Produced by: Jesús Grovas
- Starring: Tito Guízar; Andrea Palma; Margarita Mora
- Cinematography: Jack Draper
- Edited by: Juan Bustillo Oro
- Music by: Manuel Castro Padilla
- Production company: Producciónes Grovas
- Distributed by: Cinexport Distributing
- Release date: 17 September 1937
- Running time: 107 minutes
- Country: Mexico
- Language: Spanish

Poppy of the Road (Spanish: Amapola del camino) is a 1937 Mexican musical drama film directed by Juan Bustillo Oro and Antonio Guzmán Aguilera and starring Tito Guízar, Andrea Palma and Margarita Mora. The film's sets were designed by the art directors José Rodríguez Granada, Ramón Rodríguez Granada and Carlos Toussaint. Future stars Pedro Armendáriz and Esther Fernández appeared in smaller roles.

== Cast ==
- Tito Guízar as Antonio Rosales
- Andrea Palma as María
- Leopoldo 'Chato' Ortín as Margarito
- Margarita Mora as Amapola
- Aurora Campuzano as Zoila
- Pedro Armendáriz as Juan Padilla
- Joaquín Coss as Mauricio
- Manuel Noriega as Romualdo
- Dolores Camarillo as Pancha
- Humberto Rodríguez as Tenógenes
- Paco Martínez as Lito
- Ricardo Mutio as Presidente municipal
- Honorato Bassoco as Secretario
- Conchita Gentil Arcos as Gerarda
- Valentín Asperó as Borracho
- Hernán Vera as Gendarme
- Esther Fernández as Extra
- Carolina Barret as Extra

== Bibliography ==
- Amador, María Luisa. Cartelera cinematográfica, 1930-1939. Filmoteca, UNAM, 1980.
- Avila, Jacqueline. Cinesonidos: Film Music and National Identity During Mexico's Época de Oro. Oxford University Press, 2019.
