= Gloria Morel =

Mexican actress (1918–2005)

- Born: 16 June 1918; Mexico
- Died: 15 April 2005 (aged 86); Mexico City, Mexico
- Occupation: Actress
- Years active: 1934–2001 (film & TV)

Gloria Morel (1918–2005) was a Mexican film and television actress. She made her film debut in 1934 and appeared in a number of productions during the Golden Age of Mexican Cinema. Later in her career she appeared mainly in telenovas. She was the daughter of the actor Ángel T. Sala.

== Selected filmography ==
- Rosario (1935)
- La honradez es un estorbo (1937)
- Huapango (1938)
- While Mexico Sleeps (1938)
- El indio (1939)
- The Queen of the River (1939)
- Father Morelos (1943)
- Women's Prison (1951)
- Ambiciosa (1953)

== Bibliography ==
- Ramírez, Gabriel. Miguel Contreras Torres, 1899-1981. Centro de Investigación y Enseñanza Cinematográficas, Universidad de Guadalajara, 1994.
- Sandoval, Carmen Barajas. Jorge Negrete. EDAMEX, 2001.
