= Twilight (1945 film) =

1945 film by Julio Bracho

- Directed by: Julio Bracho
- Written by: Julio Bracho
- Produced by: Mauricio de la Serna
- Starring: Arturo de Córdova; Gloria Marín; Julio Villarreal
- Cinematography: Alex Phillips
- Edited by: Jorge Busto
- Music by: Raúl Lavista
- Production company: Clasa Films
- Release date: 13 April 1945
- Running time: 108 minutes
- Country: Mexico
- Language: Spanish

Twilight (Spanish: Crepúsculo) is a 1945 Mexican drama film directed by Julio Bracho and starring Arturo de Córdova, Gloria Marín and Julio Villarreal.

== Synopsis ==
Shortly before leaving for a trip to Europe, the celebrated Doctor Alejandro Mangino sees his former girlfriend Lucía posing nude in an art class. He becomes infatuated with her once more, but after returning from Europe he finds she is married to his best friend, Ricardo. He tries desperately to avoid Lucía, but struggles to overcome his obsessive feelings. She entices him into having an affair with her, despite the concerns of Lucía's younger sister Cristina, who also has a crush on Doctor Mangino. Mangino endures psychological trauma when he has to operate on Ricardo to save his life.

== Cast ==
- Arturo de Córdova as Alejandro Mangino
- Gloria Marín as Lucía
- Julio Villarreal as Maestro de psiquiatria
- Manuel Arvide as Ricardo Molina
- Octavio Martínez as Sebastián, mayordomo
- Felipe Montoya as Primitivo
- Manuel Noriega as Papá de Lucía
- Jesús Valero as Escultor
- Lilia Michel as Cristina
- Lidia Franco as Mamá de Lucía
- Carlos Aguirre as Raúl
- María Gentil Arcos as Madre de Lucia
- Francisco Jambrina as Doctor Díaz González
- Chel López as Chofer
- Luz María Núñez as Enfermera
- Salvador Quiroz as José
- Humberto Rodríguez as José, Conserje
- Félix Samper as Invitado a reunión
- Manuel Trejo Morales as Invitado a reunión
- Armando Velasco as Conductor del tren

== Bibliography ==
- Spicer, Andrew. Historical Dictionary of Film Noir. Scarecrow Press, 2010.
