= La mujer de todos =

1946 film by Julio Bracho

- Directed by: Julio Bracho
- Written by: Alexandre Dumas (novel); Robert Thoeren (play); Julio Bracho; Mauricio Magdaleno; Antonio Momplet; Xavier Villaurrutia
- Produced by: Alfredo Ripstein hijo Gregorio Walerstein
- Starring: María Félix; Armando Calvo; Gloria Lynch
- Cinematography: Alex Phillips
- Edited by: Mario González
- Music by: Raúl Lavista
- Production company: Cinematográfica Filmex
- Distributed by: Variety Distribution
- Release date: 19 September 1946
- Running time: 95 minutes
- Country: Mexico
- Language: Spanish

La mujer de todos is a 1946 Mexican drama film directed and co-written by Julio Bracho and starring María Félix, Armando Calvo and Gloria Lynch. It is an adaptation of the 1848 novel The Lady of the Camelias by Alexandre Dumas with the setting moved to Mexico at the beginning of the twentieth century.

The film's sets were designed by the art director Jesús Bracho.

== Main cast ==
- María Félix as María Romano
- Armando Calvo as Capitán Jorge Serralde
- Gloria Lynch as Señora Cañedo
- Alberto Galán as Coronel Juan Antonio Cañedo
- Patricia Morán as Angélica
- Arturo Soto Rangel as General
- Juan Calvo as Conde
- Ernesto Alonso as Carlos
- Alberto Pomo as César
- Maruja Grifell as Portera

== Bibliography ==
- Daniel Balderston, Mike Gonzalez & Ana M. Lopez. Encyclopedia of Contemporary Latin American and Caribbean Cultures. Routledge, 2002.
