= Juana Gallo =

1961 film

- Directed by: Miguel Zacarías
- Written by: Miguel Zacarías
- Starring: María Félix
- Cinematography: Gabriel Figueroa
- Release date: 12 June 1961
- Running time: 120 minutes
- Country: Mexico
- Language: Spanish

Juana Gallo is a 1961 Mexican drama film written and directed by Miguel Zacarías. It was entered into the 2nd Moscow International Film Festival.

== Plot ==
The story takes place during the Mexican Revolution. After Juana Gallo's (Maria Felix) father and boyfriend are executed by the government officials, Juana takes a courageous response in the face of her loss and rescues the men from the village who were taken as prisoners. Juana then lectures the men in the village about how Mexicans are killing other Mexicans just to protect a corrupt government.

== Cast ==
In alphabetical order

- Luis Aguilar as Arturo Ceballos Rico
- Marina Camacho as Arturo's girl
- René Cardona as Revolucionario
- María Félix as Ángela Ramos 'Juana Gallo'
- José Alfredo Jiménez as Revolucionario
- Ignacio López Tarso as Pioquinto
- Rita Macedo as Mujer famélica
- Christiane Martel Ninón, la Bailarina
- Jorge Mistral as Guillermo Velarde
- Noé Murayama as Coronel Ordoñez
