= The Woman of the Port (1934 film) =

1934 film by Arcady Boytler

La Mujer del Puerto
- Directed by: Arcady Boytler
- Written by: Raphael J. Sevilla; Guy de Maupassant; Antonio Guzmán Aguilera
- Produced by: Servando C. de la Garza
- Starring: Andrea Palma; Domingo Soler; Stella Inda
- Cinematography: Alex Phillips
- Edited by: José Marino
- Music by: Manuel Esperón; Max Urban
- Distributed by: Eurindia Films
- Release date: 14 February 1934
- Running time: 76 minutes
- Country: Mexico
- Language: Spanish

The Woman of the Port (Spanish: La Mujer del Puerto) is a 1934 Mexican romantic drama film directed by Arcady Boytler and starring Andrea Palma. The film is based on the story 'Le Port' (The Harbour) by French author Guy de Maupassant.

== Plot ==
Rosario (Andrea Palma) was the average Mexican girl that grew up in a humble household with her dad. Her boyfriend had promised to marry her and assured her that they would be better off once he landed a decent job. The Father falls sick and is not able to work, leaving his daughter helpless because she was not wed yet. In the process of trying to find some money and trying to get help, she turns to her boyfriend and finds him sleeping with another village girl. She is distraught and leaves town. She decides to leave Cordoba City to settle in Veracruz City. In a port that is facing the Gulf of Mexico, she establishes herself above a sordid cabaret, and starts "selling love" to the sailors that come from afar. She made this her life profession and enjoyed being heartless and reckless with men’s feelings. One night, a drunken sailor gets out of hand, and Alberto (Domingo Soler) rescues her from getting beaten. She is grateful and takes Alberto to her room to compensate him. After the love making they begin to talk about their backgrounds and discover that they are siblings. Rosario, distraught, leaves the cabaret and makes her way to the port's dock. Alberto searches for her, only to find her shawl floating in the water near the dock, implying that she has jumped in.

== The Director ==
Arcady Boytler's film La Mujer del puerto had some strong themes of incest and prostitution. Around this time prostitution was not a theme that most were surprised by, but it was the incest notion that gave the film controversy. It would be tempting to attribute the film's credentials to Boytler's Birth nation, but the reality of things is that it is an untouched topic. Earlier in 1930's Sergei Eisenstein's visit to Mexico influenced a dozen of directors. Boytler set out to make a film that could transcend its culture and make it an international treasure. Mexico was being torn apart by modernity and post-revolution trying to rebuild and keep the heritage intact. Through cinematic art and the influence of Eisenstein’s visit to the Americas, Mexico flourished with talent and pushed its boundaries. Boytler said “To be sure, great films will be made in Mexico. In this country, there is a great artistic spirit, and many elements of magnificent value to be discovered. I think that not all films should be too vernacular so that they are accepted and understood in other Spanish-speaking countries.” Countries that don’t understand the tendencies, or culture, if you will, from a certain part of Mexico would have a hard time understanding the message or dialect pushed through the film. On one side we have the country debating concern in identity, and on the other we have a post-revolutionary period. Boytler tried incorporating the loving side of the entity engendered by the revolution into the national space. On the other hand, we have the drive of modernization and desire to measure up to international standards of progress. In other words, you have two opposing sides: on one hand, you have the highbrow, Europeanized elite dream of inserting the nation’s creative talent into the global stream, and on the other you have ancient and borrowed elements produced by and from the masses. Boyltercaptured the heart of the masses even through the modernizing form of cinema, adding sound and incorporating the music of the people, the rancheras. The high production value made it an instant landmark within its national cinematic context. This movie truly deserves a qualification of excellence," said Luz Alba. Many critics acclaim that Boytler has a definite influence of German Expressionism but it is not the only influence.

== Cast ==
- Andrea Palma as Rosario
- Domingo Soler as Alberto
- Stella Inda as "a woman in the cabaret"
- Fabio Acevedo as Rosario's father
- Conchita Gentil Arcos as Vecina
