= Con su amable permiso =

1940 Mexican comedy film

- Directed by: Fernando Soler
- Written by: Miguel M. Delgado; Mario González; Juan Roca
- Produced by: Alfonso Sánchez Tello
- Starring: Fernando Soler; René Cardona; Virginia Serret
- Cinematography: Gabriel Figueroa
- Edited by: Mario González
- Music by: Jorge Pérez
- Production company: Producciones Azteca
- Release date: 13 November 1940
- Country: Mexico
- Language: Spanish

Con su amable permiso ("With Your Kind Permission" in Spanish) is a 1940 Mexican comedy film directed by Fernando Soler and starring Soler, René Cardona and Virginia Serret. It is Soler's debut as a director.

== Plot ==
A poor old man is mistaken for a kidnapper until he rescues a young woman who has been abducted. The girl's father is very grateful to him and offers him a place to live, which he accepts.

== Cast ==
- Fernando Soler as Plácido Bueno
- René Cardona as Carlos Saldana
- Virginia Serret as Elena de Olvera
- Eduardo Arozamena as Don Ramón de Olvera
- Rafael María de Labra as Don Melchor (as Rafael Ma. Labra)
- Manuel Noriega as Don Octavio (as Manolo Noriega)
- Ricardo Carti as Sr. Guevara
- Miguel Wimer as Señor inspector
- Antonio Bravo as El jefe
- Víctor Velázquez as Brillantina
- Gerardo del Castillo as El Frankenstein
- Juan García as El deslenguado
- Max Langler as El licenciado
- José Sánchez Ramírez as El rompevidrios
- Alfonso Parra as Señor fiscal
- Alfredo Varela as Abogado defensor
- Vicenta Roig as Eduviges Buenrostro, ama de llaves
- Joaquín Coss as Señor juez
- Charro Aguayo as El gorila
- Julio Ahuet as Agente de policía (uncredited)
- Manuel Buendía as Miembro del jurado (uncredited)
- Enrique Carrillo as Mesero (uncredited)
- Manuel Dondé as Empleado del periódico (uncredited)
- Rubén Márquez as Joven invitado a fiesta (uncredited)
- Jorge Marrón as Invitado a fiesta (uncredited)
- Leonor de Martorel as Invitada a fiesta (uncredited)
- Salvador Quiroz as Agente de policía (uncredited)
- José Ignacio Rocha as Miembro del jurado (uncredited)
- Humberto Rodríguez as Mayordomo (uncredited)
- Arturo Soto Rangel as Asistente de Plácido's Assistant (uncredited)
- Hernán Vera as Cantinero (uncredited)

== Bibliography ==
- García Riera, Emilio (1990). Los hermanos Soler (in Spanish). Universidad de Guadalajara, Centro de Investigación y Enseñanza Cinematográficas. ISBN 978-968-895-090-6.
- Amador, María Luisa; Ayala Blanco, Jorge (1982). Cartelera cinematográfica, 1940-1949 (in Spanish). Universidad Nacional Autónoma de México, Centro Universitario de Estudios Cinematográficos.
- Gubern, Román (1976). Cine español en el exilio, 1936-1939 (in Spanish). Lumen. ISBN 978-84-264-1119-8.
- García Riera, Emilio (1998). Breve historia del cine mexicano: primer siglo, 1897-1997 (in Spanish). Instituto Mexicano de Cinematografía. ISBN 978-968-5096-00-3.
- García Riera, Emilio (1963). El cine mexicano (in Spanish). Ediciones Era.
