= Such Is My Country =

1937 film

- Directed by: Arcady Boytler
- Written by: Arcady Boytler; Enrique Uthoff
- Produced by: Pedro Maus; Felipe Mier
- Starring: Mario Moreno «Cantinflas» Manuel Medel; Antonio R. Frausto; Luis G. Barreiro; Mercedes Soler; Juan José Martínez Casado
- Cinematography: Víctor Herrera
- Edited by: José Marino
- Music by: Ignacio Fernández Esperón
- Production company: CISA
- Distributed by: Artistas Unidos de México
- Release date: 15 September 1937 (Mexico)
- Running time: 82 minutes
- Country: Mexico
- Language: Spanish

Such Is My Country (Spanish: ¡Así es mi tierra!) is a 1937 Mexican comedy film directed by Arcady Boytler and starring Antonio R. Frausto, Mercedes Soler, Juan José Martínez Casado, Manuel Medel, and Mario Moreno «Cantinflas». It was the first film to feature Cantinflas in a prominent role (his film debut Don't Fool Yourself Dear only featuring him in a brief appearance) and the first of Cantinflas's films together with Medel as a team.

The film's sets were designed by the art director José Rodríguez Granada.

== Plot ==
In 1916, in the middle of the Mexican Revolution, a General (Antonio R. Frausto) returns to his home village, where he is received with a great party. The general is interested in the young Isabelita (Mercedes Soler), without knowing that she already maintains a secret romance with Filomeno (Juan José Martínez Casado). Meanwhile, "El Tejón" (Cantinflas), a farmhand who idolizes the General, and Procopio (Manuel Medel), the General's right-hand man, are vying for the love of ranchwoman Cholita (Margarita Cortés).

== Cast ==
- Mario Moreno «Cantinflas» as El Tejón
- Manuel Medel as Procopio
- Antonio R. Frausto as General
- Luis G. Barreiro as Licenciado
- Mercedes Soler as Isabelita
- Juan José Martínez Casado as Filomeno (as J.J. Martinez Casado)
- Margarita Cortés as Cholita
- Amelia Wilhelmy as Adelita
- Josefina Segarra as Doña Tomasa
- Ángel T. Sala as Compadre Gallo
- Miguel Wimer as Cayetano
- Luis Ureña as Nicanor
- Ángel Arzamendi as Don Chon
- Guillermo Calles as Gonzalo
- Antonio Garay as Gómez
- Ana María Castañeda as Restituta
- Carolina Barret as Carolina (uncredited)
- Leonor Gómez as Lupe (uncredited)
- José Elías Moreno as Party guest (uncredited)
- Alicia Reyna as Cook at party (uncredited)
- José Ignacio Rocha as Party guest (uncredited)

== Analysis ==
The authors of Mexico: An Encyclopedia of Contemporary Culture and History argue that the film parodied the comedia ranchera film genre, saying, "Given his decidedly un-macho persona, it seems appropriate and hardly coincidental that the first target of his humor was that the most manly of Mexican film genres, comedia ranchera." Michael Werner in his Concise Encyclopedia of Mexico complimented the "Eisensteinian aesthetics that Boytler incorporates" to the film. Conversely, in his books Escenas de pudor y liviandad and Los ídolos a nado: Una antología global, Carlos Monsiváis stated that Cantinflas's pelado character was incompatible with the rural setting of the film, in contrast to the city setting of his later films, saying that "[his thing] is the new urban sensibility." In his book Más allá de las lágrimas, Isaac León Frías collects Aurelio de los Reyes's criticism of the film's limited exterior filming, contrasting it with Allá en el Rancho Grande saying, "It tries to capture the return home of the revolutionaries, but the return is a pretext for the action to take place 'inside walls' on film sets. Outdoors and natural settings take second place, the opposite of Allá en el Rancho Grande. It takes refuge in the studios perhaps because another reality is more comfortably manufactured there."
