= The Shadow of the Bridge =

1948 film

- Directed by: Roberto Gavaldón
- Written by: José Revueltas; Roberto Gavaldón
- Based on: Winterset by Maxwell Anderson
- Produced by: José M. Noriega
- Starring: Esther Fernández; David Silva; Rodolfo Landa
- Cinematography: Alex Phillips
- Music by: Gonzalo Curiel
- Production company: Ramex Films
- Distributed by: RKO Radio Pictures de México
- Release date: 8 July 1948
- Country: Mexico
- Language: Spanish

The Shadow of the Bridge (Spanish: A la sombra del puente) is a 1948 Mexican drama film directed by Roberto Gavaldón and starring Esther Fernández, David Silva and Rodolfo Landa. It is based on the 1935 play Winterset by Maxwell Anderson. The film's sets were designed by the art director Gunther Gerszo.

== Cast ==
- Esther Fernández
- David Silva
- Rodolfo Landa
- Guillermo Calles
- Gilberto González
- Rafael Icardo
- Agustín Irusta
- Carlos López Moctezuma
- Mary Montoya
- Manuel Noriega Ruiz
- Andrés Soler
- Arturo Soto Rangel
- Fernando Soto "Mantequilla"

== Bibliography ==
- Agrasánchez, Rogelio . Guillermo Calles: A Biography of the Actor and Mexican Cinema Pioneer. McFarland, 2010.
- Hershfield, Joanne; Maciel, David R. Mexico's Cinema: A Century of Film and Filmmakers. Rowman & Littlefield Publishers, 1999.
