= Mercedes Soler (actress) =

Mexican film actress (1914–1971)

- Born: Mercedes Díaz Pavia; 19 November 1914; Los Angeles, California, U.S.
- Died: 16 February 1971 (aged 56); Mexico City, Mexico
- Other name: Meche Soler
- Occupation: Actress
- Years active: 1933–1958
- Spouse: Alejandro Ciangherotti
- Children: 3

Mercedes Díaz Pavia (19 November 1914 – 16 February 1971), better known by the stage name Mercedes Soler, was a Mexican American film actress of the Golden Age of Mexican cinema. She appeared in over 20 films in her career.

== Early life ==
Mercedes Soler was born in the United States as Mercedes Díaz Pavía on 19 November 1914 to Domingo Díaz García, a Galician actor, and Irene Pavía Soler, a Valencian actress. His parents were Spanish theater actors who had come to Mexico with a theatrical company. She was raised and lived in Mexico. She was the younger sister of Fernando Soler, Andrés Soler, Domingo Soler, and Julián Soler, a family known as the Soler Dynasty.

== Personal life ==
Mercedes Soler was married to Alejandro Ciangherotti until she died on 16 February 1971. They had two sons, Alejandro Ciangherotti II and Fernando Luján, and one daughter, Mercedes Ciangherotti de Gomar.

== Filmography ==
Year	Title	Role	Notes
1933	Águilas de América	Mercedes	
1935	Tierra, amor y dolor		
1937	Such Is My Country	Isabelita	
1943	Internado para señoritas		
1944	Felipe Derblay, el herrero		
1947	Ecija's Seven Children		
1948	Los viejos somos así	Hermana religiosa	Uncredited
1948	Ojos de juventud	Enfermera	Uncredited
1949	El vengador	Doña Marta	
1949	Yo maté a Juan Charrasqueado		
1949	Coqueta	Maestra	
1949	El diablo no es tan diablo	Marcela Villacanela	
1950	When the Night Ends	Ana María	
1950	It's a Sin to Be Poor	Doña Mariquita	
1951	Burlada	Yolanda	
1951	Women's Prison	Rosa	
1952	A Place Near Heaven	Enfermera	
1954	Lágrimas robadas		
1954	La Perversa	Doña Dolores	
1955	El Seductor		
1955	Sólo para maridos		
1956	Amor y pecado	Madre de Miguel	
1957	El vampiro	Maria - servant	
1958	El gran premio	Madre superiora	(final film role)
