= Antonio Guzmán Aguilera =

Mexican screenwriter and playwright

- Born: 21 March 1894; Zacatecas, Mexico
- Died: 5 June 1958 (aged 64); Mexico City, Mexico
- Occupations: Screenwriter, Director, Journalist
- Years active: 1922–1958 (film)

Antonio Guzmán Aguilera (1894–1958) was a Mexican screenwriter active during the Golden Age of Mexican Cinema. He had been active for many years as prolific playwright and journalist. He also co-directed two films in the late 1930s. He is also known by the name Guz Águila.

== Selected filmography ==
- La Llorona (1933)
- El vuelo de la muerte (1934)
- The Woman of the Port (1934)
- Allá en el Rancho Grande (1936)
- Poppy of the Road (1937)
- Heads or Tails (1937)
- The Coward (1939)
- Father's Entanglements (1939)
- ¡Así se quiere en Jalisco! (1942)
- I Am a Charro of Rancho Grande (1947)
- Music, Poetry and Madness (1948)
- Rough But Respectable (1949)
- My Favourite (1950)
- To the Sound of the Mambo (1950)
- We Maids (1951)
- Los muertos no hablan (1958)

== Bibliography ==
- Elena, Alberto & Lopez, Marina Diaz. The Cinema of Latin America. Columbia University Press, 2013.
- Kanellos, Nicolás. A History of Hispanic Theatre in the United States: Origins to 1940.
