= El indio (1939 film) =

- title card
- Directed by: Armando Vargas de la Maza
- Written by: Celestino Gorostiza
- Based on: El indio by Gregorio López y Fuentes
- Starring: Pedro Armendáriz; Consuelo Frank; Dolores Camarillo; Eduardo Vivas
- Cinematography: Jack Draper
- Release dates: 10 February 1939 (Mexico); 12 May 1939 (U.S.)
- Country: Mexico
- Language: Spanish

El indio (English: The Indian) is a 1939 Mexican drama film directed by Armando Vargas de la Maza and based on the novel of the same name by Gregorio López y Fuentes. It was released in Mexico on 10 February 1939 and in United States on 12 May of the same year. Consuelo Frank and Pedro Armendáriz received equal billing, while Dolores Camarillo (billed as Dolores C. de Frausto), who was the film's comic relief, was billed last. Later she would receive a somewhat higher billing in Cantinflas's Ahí está el detalle.

The film also explores an early form of Mexican indio comic performances given by Carlos López "Chaflán" and Dolores Camarillo. These comic roles would later give inspiration to María Elena Velasco's La India María film series.

== Synopsis ==
El indio is set in Puebla during the rule of President Porfirio Díaz (1876–1911). It centers on an hacienda owned by an ambitious landowner who mistreats his indigenous peones. One of the peones, Felipe (Pedro Armendáriz), has separated himself from the hacienda and the tribe and relies on hunting to survive. He is in love with María (Consuelo Frank), a beautiful white Indian girl who is constantly beleaguered by the hacienda's owner.

== Cast ==
- Consuelo Frank as María
- Pedro Armendáriz as Felipe
- Eduardo Vivas as Hacendado
- Gloria Morel as Cristina
- Carlos López "Chaflán"
- Enrique Cancino
- Ángel T. Sala
- Ernesto Finance
- Alfonso Parra
- Jesús Ojeda
- Rafael Icardo
- Dolores C. de Frausto as Panchita
- Max Langler as Indian (uncredited)
