= Rosario (1935 film) =

1935 Mexican film by Miguel Zacarías

- Directed by: Miguel Zacarías
- Starring: Gloria Morel and Pedro Armendáriz
- Cinematography: Gilberto Martínez Solares
- Release date: 1935
- Running time: 100 minutes
- Country: Mexico
- Language: Spanish

Rosario ("Rosary") is a 1935 Mexican drama film directed by Miguel Zacarías. It stars Gloria Morel and Pedro Armendáriz on his silver screen debut.

== Cast ==
- Gloria Morel
- Pedro Armendáriz
- Natalia Ortiz
- Jorge Treviño
- Matilde Corell
- Julio Taboada
- Joaquín Coss
- Fanny Schiller
- Esther Fernández
- Ismael Rodríguez
- Rafael Icardo
- Noemí Blanco
- María Porras
