= The Lady of the Camellias (1944 film) =

1944 film

- Directed by: Gabriel Soria
- Written by: Robert Tasker
- Based on: The Lady of the Camellias by Alexandre Dumas
- Produced by: Jorge Vélez
- Starring: Lina Montes; Emilio Tuero; Fanny Schiller
- Cinematography: Agustín Martínez Solares
- Edited by: Charles L. Kimball
- Music by: Jorge Pérez
- Production company: Panamerican Films
- Distributed by: Azteca Films
- Release date: 11 March 1944
- Running time: 115 minutes
- Country: Mexico
- Language: Spanish

The Lady of the Camellias (Spanish: La dama de las camelias) is a 1944 Mexican historical drama film directed by Gabriel Soria and starring Lina Montes, Emilio Tuero and Fanny Schiller. The film's sets were designed by the art director Manuel Fontanals. It is an adaptation of the 1848 French novel The Lady of the Camellias by Alexandre Dumas.

== Synopsis ==
In nineteenth century Paris, Marguerite, a courtesan, falls in love with Armand a promising young man from a good family. His father begs her not to ruin his career and she reluctantly gives him up. When she falls desperately ill some time later she discovers that Armand still loves her.

== Cast ==
- Lina Montes as Marguerite Gauthier
- Emilio Tuero as Armand Duval
- Fanny Schiller as Prudence
- Miguel Arenas as Georges Duval
- Alejandro Cobo as Count de Varville
- Tony Díaz as Gaston
- Mercedes Ferriz as Nannina
- Blanca Rosa Otero as Suzette
- Charles Rooner as Pierre
- Roberto Cañedo as Extra

== Bibliography ==
- Alfaro, Eduardo de la Vega. Gabriel Soria, 1903–1971. Universidad de Guadalajara, 1992.
- Riera, Emilio García. Historia documental del cine mexicano: 1943–1945. Universidad de Guadalajara, 1992.
