= The Mulatta of Cordoba =

1945 film

- Directed by: Adolfo Fernández Bustamante
- Written by: Adolfo Fernández Bustamante; Xavier Villaurrutia; Elvira de la Mora
- Produced by: Manuel Sisniega Otero; Felipe Subervielle
- Starring: Lina Montes; Víctor Junco; Víctor Manuel Mendoza
- Cinematography: Agustín Jiménez
- Edited by: Gloria Schoemann
- Music by: Gonzalo Curiel; Manuel Esperón
- Production company: Films Mundiales
- Distributed by: Clasa-Mohme
- Release date: 20 December 1945
- Running time: 80 minutes
- Country: Mexico
- Language: Spanish

The Mulatta of Cordoba (Spanish: La mulata de Córdoba) is a 1945 Mexican drama film directed by Adolfo Fernández Bustamante and starring Lina Montes, Víctor Junco and Víctor Manuel Mendoza. It was shot at the Clasa Studios in Mexico City. The film's sets were designed by the art director Manuel Fontanals.

== Synopsis ==
On Cuba, the beautiful mulatta Belén San Juan is the daughter of a wealthy landowner and a black slave. On her father's death she inherits his property, to the anger of her uncle who covets the estate himself.

== Cast ==
- Lina Montes as Belén de San Juan
- Víctor Junco as Pedro
- Víctor Manuel Mendoza as Juan Miguel
- José Baviera as Don Carlos San Juan
- Eduardo Casado as Don Antonio
- María Douglas as Emilia de San Juan
- Enrique Zambrano as Don Luis de San Juan
- Rosa Castro as Mamá de Emilia
- Lilón as María Belén
- Luis Jiménez Morán as Tlacuache
- Toña la Negra as Nana Paz
- Manuel Trejo Morales as Invitado fiesta
- Columba Domínguez as Pueblerina
- José Escanero as Invitado fiesta
- Juan José Laboriel as Pueblerino
- Chimi Monterrey as Pueblerino
- Javier Puente as Amigo de Carlos
- María Valdealde as Invitada racista fiesta

== Bibliography ==
- Balderston, Daniel, Gonzalez, Mike & Lopez, Ana M. Encyclopedia of Contemporary Latin American and Caribbean Cultures. Routledge, 2002.
- Delgadillo, Theresa. Geographies of Relation: Diasporas and Borderlands in the Americas. University of Michigan Press, 2024.
