= Su adorable majadero =

- Directed by: Alberto Gout
- Starring: Sara García; Carlos Riquelme; Tomás Perrín
- Release date: 1938
- Country: Mexico
- Language: Spanish

Su adorable majadero ("His Adorable Fool") is a 1938 Mexican film. It was directed by Alberto Gout and stars Sara García, Carlos Riquelme and Tomás Perrín.

Gout's directorial debut, it is a romantic comedy about university students set during the struggle for university autonomy in the 1930s and includes stock footage of the real-world student protests.

A review of the film by Xavier Villaurrutia was published in the Mexico City magazine Hoy on 6 May 1939.
