= Leopoldo Ortín =

Peruvian actor

- Born: 23 December 1893; Lima, Peru
- Died: 3 August 1953 (aged 59); Acapulco, Mexico
- Other name: Leopoldo 'Chato' Ortín
- Occupation: Actor
- Years active: 1926–1952 (film)

Leopoldo 'Chato' Ortín (1893–1953) was a Peruvian stage and film actor. He was active during the Golden Age of Mexican Cinema, appearing in lead and supporting roles. Having arrived in Mexico to study he was a supporter of Pancho Villa during the Mexican Revolution. He was the father of the actor Polo Ortín.

== Selected filmography ==
- Martín Garatuza (1935)
- Heroic Silence (1935)
- Poppy of the Road (1937)
- Come on Ponciano (1937)
- La honradez es un estorbo (1937)
- Father's Entanglements (1939)
- Horse for Horse (1939)
- Las tres viudas de papá (1942)
- Father Gets Entangled Again (1942)
- El ahijado de la muerte (1946)

== Bibliography ==
- Avila, Jaqueline. Cinesonidos: Film Music and National Identity During Mexico's Época de Oro. Oxford University Press, 2019.
- Holmstrom, John. The Moving Picture Boy: An International Encyclopaedia from 1895 to 1995, Norwich, Michael Russell, 1996.
- Poppe, Nicolas. Alton's Paradox: Foreign Film Workers and the Emergence of Industrial Cinema in Latin America. State University of New York Press, 2021.
