= Charles L. Kimball =

American screenwriter

- Born: March 24, 1897; Cleveland, Ohio, United States
- Died: September 25, 1976 (aged 79); Los Angeles, United States
- Occupations: Film editor and writer
- Years active: 1932-1964

Charles Leonard Kimball (March 24, 1897 - September 25, 1976) was an American film editor and writer.

Active in Hollywood from 1932 on high-profile RKO Radio Pictures projects and a few short subjects, from 1934 onwards he worked almost exclusively on Mexican projects. Kimball was active until 1964. He was awarded the Mexican Ariel Award in 1951 for his editing work on In the Palm of Your Hand, and nominated for another the following year.

== Selected filmography ==
- The Half-Naked Truth, 1932
- Thirteen Women, 1932
- State's Attorney, 1932
- La Zandunga, 1938 (Mexican production)
- From Nurse to Worse, 1940 (writer, Three Stooges short subject)
- Neither Blood Nor Sand (1941)
- The Count of Monte Cristo (1942)
- Land of Passions (1943)
- Doña Bárbara, 1943
- Santa (1943)
- Nana, 1944
- The Lady of the Camellias (1944)
- The Escape (1944)
- La Otra, 1946
- Strange Appointment (1947)
- The Torch, 1950
- In the Palm of Your Hand (1951)
- Tehuantepec (1954)
- Comanche, 1956
- The Big Boodle, 1957
