= Come on Ponciano =

1937 film

- Directed by: Gabriel Soria
- Written by: Elvira de la Mora; Gabriel Soria
- Produced by: Gabriel Soria
- Starring: Jesús Solórzano; Consuelo Frank; Leopoldo Ortín
- Cinematography: Alex Phillips
- Edited by: José M. Noriega
- Music by: Lorenzo Barcelata; Manuel Esperón
- Production company: Producciones Soria
- Distributed by: Columbia Films
- Release date: 16 April 1937
- Running time: 101 minutes
- Country: Mexico
- Language: Spanish

Come on Ponciano (Spanish: ¡Ora Ponciano!) is a 1937 Mexican historical drama film directed by Gabriel Soria and starring Jesús Solórzano, Consuelo Frank and Leopoldo Ortín. It was shot at the San Ángel Studios in Mexico City. The film's sets were designed by the art director Luis Moya. It was entered in the 1938 Venice Film Festival where it competed for the Mussolini Cup.

== Synopsis ==
In nineteenth century Mexico celebrated matador Ponciano Diaz skill at bullfighting is matched with his romantic pursuit of the attractive Rosario

== Cast ==
- Jesús Solórzano as Ponciano Diaz
- Consuelo Frank as Rosario
- Leopoldo Ortín as Juanón
- Carlos López as Lolo
- Mercedes Azcarate as Mercedes
- Carlos Villarías as Don Luis Martínez del Arco
- Maruja Gómez as Maruja
- María Calvo as Tia Pilar
- Elvira Azcarate as Rosario, niña
- Pepe del Río as Ponciano, niño
- Lorenzo Barcelata as Lorenzo
- Consuelo Segarra as Chonita

== Bibliography ==
- Elena, Alberto & Lopez, Marina Diaz. The Cinema of Latin America. Columbia University Press, 2013.
- Richard, Alfred. Censorship and Hollywood's Hispanic image: an interpretive filmography, 1936–1955. Greenwood Press, 1993.
