= The Magician (1949 film) =

- Spanish: El Mago
- Directed by: Miguel M. Delgado
- Written by: Alex Joffé; Jean Lévitte; Jaime Salvador
- Produced by: Santiago Reachi; Jacques Gelman
- Starring: Mario Moreno «Cantinflas» Leonora Amar; José Baviera
- Cinematography: Raúl Martínez Solares
- Edited by: Jorge Bustos
- Music by: Gonzalo Curiel
- Production company: Posa Films
- Release date: 4 May 1949
- Running time: 100 minutes
- Country: Mexico
- Language: Spanish

The Magician (Spanish: El Mago) is a 1949 Mexican comedy film directed by Miguel M. Delgado and starring Mario "Cantinflas" Moreno, Leonora Amar and José Baviera. The film tells the story of lookalike hired from an agency to take the place of a magician who has gone on holiday.

The film's sets were designed by the art director Gunther Gerszo.

A small chunk of the film is shown in the background of Episode 2 of Season 2 of Breaking Bad.

== Cast ==
- Mario Moreno as Cantinflas
- Leonora Amar as Jeanette
- José Baviera as Mago Krishnar
- Ernesto Finance as Makazar
- Alejandro Cobo as Jefe de secuestradores
- Pepe Martínez as Ministro de Arichi
- Miguel Manzano as Serafín
- Amparo Arozamena as Mujer de Pedro, clienta de mago
- Rafael Icardo as Ministro de Arichi
- Rudy del Moral as Ruperto
- Julián de Meriche
- Olga Chaviano as Bailarina
- Jorge Mondragon
- Óscar Pulido as Jefe de la secreta
- Victorio Blanco as Asesino turbante (uncredited)
- Guillermo Calles as Asesino turbante (uncredited)
- Roberto Corell as Maraja de Pentanal (uncredited)
- Eduardo Finance (uncredited)
- Lidia Franco (uncredited)
- Ramiro Gamboa as Reportero (uncredited)
- Enrique García Álvarez as Señor director (uncredited)
- María Gentil Arcos as Clienta de Krishnar (uncredited)
- Leonor Gómez as Vendedora de comida (uncredited)
- Queta Lavat as Secretaria (uncredited)
- Cecilia Leger as Invitada a cena (uncredited)
- Margarito Luna as Secuestrador (uncredited)
- Paco Martínez as Doctor (uncredited)
- Álvaro Matute as Secuestrador (uncredited)
- Pepe Nava as Fakir Birman (uncredited)
- Manuel Noriega as Profesor escuela, cliente mago (uncredited)
- José Ortiz de Zárate as Doctor (uncredited)
- Sonia Ramos (uncredited)
- Humberto Rodríguez as Ministro de Arichi (uncredited)
- Sergio Rodríguez (uncredited)
- María Valdealde as Señora del Moral, clienta de Krishnar (uncredited)
- Armando Velasco as Empleado hotel (uncredited)
- Acela Vidaurri (uncredited)
- Burdette Zea (uncredited)

== Bibliography ==
- Pilcher, Jeffrey M. (2001). Cantinflas and the Chaos of Mexican Modernity. Rowman & Littlefield, Bloomsbury Publishing PLC. ISBN 978-0-8420-2771-7.
