= Cube Bonifant =

Mexican writer (1904–1993)

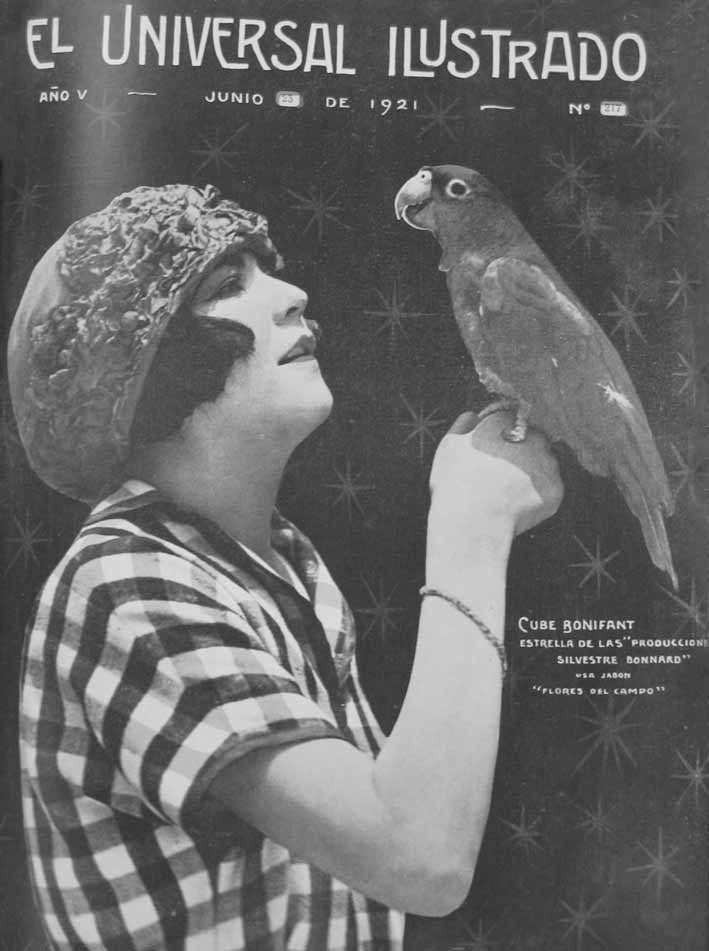
- Born: Antonia Bonifant López; 1904; Sinaloa
- Died: August 16, 1993 (aged 88–89); Coyoacán
- Other names: Luz Alba; Aura Stella
- Occupation: Critic, actor, film actor, writer, poet

Cube Bonifant (1904 – August 16, 1993, born Antonia Bonifant López) was a Mexican journalist, satirist, and film critic known as Una Pequeña Marquesa de Sade ("little Marquis de Sade") for her biting wit.

== Early life ==
She was born Antonia Bonifant López in El Rosario, a small mining town in Sinaloa.

Her sister was the silent film actress Carmen López. She got her nickname Cube as a girl by mispronouncing the greeting "¿Qué hubo?" as "Cu-be."

== Career ==
Bonifant first published writings were romantic poems that were published in the Mexican newspapers, Revista de Revistas and El Ilustrado. In 1921 she began writing a column for El Ilustrado. The column was directed at women, but was a shift away from columns about household items.

Starting in 1927 she began publishing film critiques under the name Luz Alba. One year later she began writing under the name Aura Stella about Mexican movie stars for the magazine Rotográfico.

Bonifant also did some work in acting, starring in the 1922 play La gran noticia and as an extra in the 1931 film Santa.

== Death ==
Bonifant died on 16 August 1993 in Coyoacán.
