= Father Morelos =

1943 film

- Directed by: Miguel Contreras Torres
- Written by: Lucas Alamán; Miguel Contreras Torres; J. Hernández Dávalos; Carlos María de Bustamante
- Produced by: Miguel Contreras Torres
- Starring: Domingo Soler; Consuelo Frank; Narciso Busquets
- Cinematography: Alex Phillips
- Edited by: Juan José Marino
- Music by: Miguel Bernal Jiménez
- Production company: Hispano Continental Films
- Release date: 22 January 1943
- Running time: 108 minutes
- Country: Mexico
- Language: Spanish

Father Morelos (Spanish: El padre Morelos) is a 1943 Mexican historical drama film directed by Miguel Contreras Torres and starring Domingo Soler, Consuelo Frank and Narciso Busquets. It is a biopic inspired by the life of José María Morelos, one of the leaders of the Mexican War of Independence. It was followed by a sequel Lightning in the South. It was shot at the Azteca Studios in Mexico City. The film's sets were designed by the art director Luis Moya.

== Cast ==
- Domingo Soler as José María Morelos y Pavón
- Consuelo Frank as María Antonia Morelos
- Narciso Busquets as José María Morelos y Pavón niño
- Dolores Camarillo as María Barragán
- Gloria Morel as Brigida Almonte
- Alfredo del Diestro as Melchor Gutiérrez
- Antonio R. Frausto as Gregorio Zapién
- Raúl Guerrero as Sebastían
- Carlos Villarías as Natividad Godínez
- Ricardo Mutio as Rafael Guedéa
- Socorro Astol as Juana Pavón
- Manuel Noriega as Manuel Morelos
- Paco Martínez as Don Miguel Hidalgo y Costilla
- Alfredo de Soto as Don Ignacio Allende
- Paco Astol as Arriero Jacinto
- Juan José Laboriel as Negro Zenón
- Ricardo Carti as Conde de Sierra Gorda
- Lupe Inclán as Marta Gutiérrez
- Lupe del Castillo as Eugenia de Godínez

== Bibliography ==
- Ramírez, Gabriel . Miguel Contreras Torres, 1899-1981. Centro de Investigación y Enseñanza Cinematográficas, Universidad de Guadalajara, 1994.
- Turner, Frederick C. The Dynamic of Mexican Nationalism. University of North Carolina Press, 1968.
