= Land of Passions =

1943 film

- Directed by: José Benavides
- Written by: Miguel N. Lira (play); Alejandro Galindo; Marco Aurelio Galindo
- Produced by: David Negrete
- Starring: Jorge Negrete; Margarita Mora; Pedro Armendáriz
- Cinematography: Agustín Martínez Solares
- Edited by: Charles L. Kimball
- Music by: Manuel Esperón
- Production company: Cimesa
- Distributed by: Cimesa
- Release date: 20 May 1943
- Running time: 101 minutes
- Country: Mexico
- Language: Spanish

Land of Passions (Spanish: Tierra de pasiones) is a 1943 Mexican musical adventure film directed by José Benavides and starring Jorge Negrete, Margarita Mora and Pedro Armendáriz. It was shot at the Clasa Studios in Mexico City. The film's sets were designed by the art director Manuel Fontanals.

== Cast ==
- Jorge Negrete as Máximo Tepal
- Margarita Mora as Linda Maldonado
- José Baviera as Don Diego Bandera
- Pedro Armendáriz as Porfirio
- Carlos Orellana as Salvador Peredo
- Margarita Cortés as Camila
- Carolina Barret as Noemi
- Arturo Soto Rangel as Leoncio Vicencio
- Crox Alvarado as Hijo de Leandro
- Víctor Velázquez as Hijo de Leandro
- Rafael Icardo as Leandro Cisneros
- Pedro Galindo as Toñino
- Manuel Dondé as Rebelde
- Conchita Gentil Arcos as Doña Albina
- Salvador Quiroz as Dionisio Reyes

== Bibliography ==
- Riera, Emilio García. Historia documental del cine mexicano: 1941. Ediciones Era, 1969.
- Sadlier, Darlene Joy (ed.) Latin American Melodrama: Passion, Pathos, and Entertainment. University of Illinois Press, 2009.
