= Cuando habla el corazón =

- Directed by: Juan José Segura; Roberto Gavaldón
- Written by: Ernesto Cortázar; Ramón Pérez Peláez; Roberto Gavaldón
- Produced by: Rosas Priego
- Starring: Pedro Infante; María Luisa Zea; Víctor Manuel Mendoza
- Cinematography: Agustín Jiménez
- Edited by: Rafael Ceballos
- Music by: Manuel Esperón; Ernesto Cortázar; Pepe Guízar
- Production company: Rosas Priego y Fallón
- Distributed by: Columbia Pictures
- Release date: October 21, 1943
- Running time: 95 minutes
- Country: Mexico
- Language: Spanish

Cuando habla el corazón is a 1943 Mexican western drama film directed by Juan José Segura and Roberto Gavaldón and starring Pedro Infante, María Luisa Zea, and Víctor Manuel Mendoza. The film was released at the Iris Theater (Teatro Iris) on October 21, 1943.

== Songs ==
- Del norte ni sí ni no by Pepe Guízar
- Ventanita de oro by Pedro D'Lille and Felipe Bermejo
- El azotón by Pedro D'Lille and Felipe Bermejo
- Corrido de Chihuahua

== Plot ==
Set in Chihuahua in 1905, two young men are sent out hunting separately as tests of their manhood (prueba de cartrucho), each one given only one cartridge. Cruz González (Mendoza) hopes to bring back a bear, but Miguel Del Campo's (Infante) father insists that if Miguel doesn't get a deer, that he's not to come home. When Miguel takes a shot at a deer, he falls and shoots in the air. A little while later Cruz sees Miguel looking unhappy, who explains that now he can't go home because he used his only cartridge and didn't kill a deer. Cruz offers Miguel his only cartridge, explaining he'll get another one from home. Later Miguel brings a deer back home and his father is very proud, however Cruz has nothing to show for his effort and greatly disappoints his godfather Don Rafael (Soto Rangel) who disowns him.

Ten years later Miguel travels to San Andres, Chihuahua and seduces a young woman named Anna María (Cora). He then receives news that his father is ill and tells her he needs to go back home, with a promise that he'll return. He leaves her the letter that Cruz sent him as proof that he had to leave.

After a period of mourning, Miguel throws a birthday party for his sister Cecilia (Zea), Marco (Pérez) brings flowers for her but is not allowed to enter the party by Miguel and Cruz. Miguel warns Marco to leave her alone, but Marco insinuates that one of them has committed sins in San Andres but won't say more, telling them to find out on their own. During the party Cruz receives a letter stating that his sister, Anna María is not well, and leaves for San Andres. By the time he gets there she has already died, and Cruz vows to take care of her newborn daughter and avenge her dishonor.

Marco starts a fight with Cruz in a cantina, but El Yaqui (Bedoya) shoots the pistol out of Marco's hand. Cruz and Miguel go to Cleofas' (Ahuet) house to borrow a donkey for the milk to feed the baby, when they get there Mariana tells them that they've been robbed and that Cleofas has been kidnapped. Later Marco forces Cleofas to write a letter to Cruz, telling him that he has the man he's looking for, the father of his child, and to meet him that night. Cleofas escapes and warns Don Rafael that Cruz is in danger, the two men go look for him. Marco puts his own hat and jacket on another man and forces him to meet at the designated location in his place but the man is killed by those trying to protect Cruz.

Marco's men convince him to kidnap Cecilia, but before he has a chance to do that he comes up with a better plan. Miguel receives a packet with a letter from the late Anna María, revealing that she is Cruz's sister and letting him know that they have a child together and not to let her brother know he is the father. Cruz asks Cecilia to marry him and she accepts. Marco steals the letter. Later Miguel and Cruz get into an argument with, Chueco (López) one of Marco's men who starts to tell them he knows about the letter, but Miguel kills him before he has a chance to finish. Cruz tells Miguel to leave and takes the blame for the murder, and convinces Don Rafael to put him under house arrest.

Miguel confronts Marco, demanding the letter and shoots him then flees. Cruz and other men rush over and Marco tells him that Miguel is father of Anna María's baby. Cruz wants to kill Miguel, but his mother begs him not to. Don Rafael sets them up for a duel, giving each of them only one cartridge, but Cruz falls during the duel and shoots into the air. Miguel gives him his cartridge, and reminds him that Cruz saved his honor as a boy by giving him his cartridge, and now he can save his honor as a man. Cruz cannot bring himself to kill his longtime friend and walks away with Cecilia.

== Cast ==
- Pedro Infante as Miguel del Campo
- María Luisa Zea as Cecilia
- Víctor Manuel Mendoza as Cruz González
- Narciso Busquets as Miguel as a child
- José Eduardo Pérer as Marco
- Susana Cora as Ana María
- Arturo Soto Rangel as Don Rafael
- Fanny Schiller as Doña Rosa
- Elías Haber as Cruz as a child
- Alfonso Bedoya as El Yaqui (as Alfonso Bedolla)
- Julio Ahuet as Cleofas
- Chel López as El Chueco
- David Valle González as Don Miguel

== Sources ==
Amador, Maria Luisa; Ayala Blanco, Jorge (1982). Cartelera Cinematografica (1940-1949) (PDF). Mexico City, Mexico: Universidad Nacional Autónoma de México. pp. 153–154.
