= Resurrection (1943 film) =

1943 film

- Directed by: Gilberto Martínez Solares
- Written by: Gilberto Martínez Solares; Eduardo Ugarte; Rodolfo Usigli
- Based on: Resurrection by Leo Tolstoy
- Produced by: Mauricio de la Serna
- Starring: Emilio Tuero; Lupita Tovar; Sara García
- Cinematography: Raúl Martínez Solares
- Edited by: Jorge Bustos
- Music by: Mario Ruiz Armengol
- Production company: Clasa Films Mundiales
- Distributed by: Clasa-Mohme
- Release date: 6 May 1943
- Running time: 88 minutes
- Country: Mexico
- Language: Spanish

Resurrection (Spanish: Resurrección) is a 1943 Mexican period drama film directed by Gilberto Martínez Solares and starring Emilio Tuero, Lupita Tovar, Sara García and Rafael Banquells. It is based on the 1899 novel Resurrection by Leo Tolstoy. It relocates Tolstoy's story to Mexico in the early 20th century, at the brink of the Mexican Revolution and its land reform. The film's sets were designed by the art director Manuel Fontanals.

== Cast ==
- Emilio Tuero as Fernando Rivas
- Lupita Tovar as María
- Sara García as Genoveva
- Rafael Banquells as Gabriel
- Carmen Montejo as Presa
- Amparo Morillo as Isabel
- José Pulido as Practicante
- Alejandro Cobo as Guillermo
- Julio Ahuet as Nieves
- Consuelo Guerrero de Luna as Tía Refugio
- Enrique García Álvarez as Juez
- José Torvay as Carcelero
- Victoria Argota
- Elena D'Orgaz
- Lupe del Castillo
- Edmundo Espino
- Eugenia Galindo
- Rosario García
- Arturo Soto Rangel
- Enrique Uthoff
- Víctor Velázquez

== Bibliography ==
- Goble, Alan. The Complete Index to Literary Sources in Film. Walter de Gruyter, 1999.
- Paranaguá, Paulo Antonio. Mexican Cinema. British Film Institute, 1995.
