= Narciso Busquets =

Mexican actor (1929–1989)

- Born: Narciso José Enrique Busquets Pérez Rubio; September 8, 1929; Mexico City, Mexico
- Died: December 14, 1988 (aged 59); Mexico City, Mexico
- Occupations: Actor, voice-over

Narciso José Enrique Busquets Pérez Rubio (8 September 1929 – 14 December 1988), professionally known as Narciso Busquets, was a Mexican actor and voice-over. He also directed a film, Sin fortuna, in 1980.

== Life and career ==
Narciso José Enrique Busquets Pérez Rubio was born on 8 September 1929. He began his acting career in 1937, as a child actor, and appeared as one of Cantinflas' sons in Ahí está el detalle. He dubbed the voice of Japanese actor Toshirō Mifune in Spanish in the film Ánimas Trujano, which was nominated for an Academy Award for Best Foreign Language Film.

Among his other contributions in film are El gallo de oro with Ignacio López Tarso and Lucha Villa, Los cuatro Juanes with Luis Aguilar, Pedro Páramo with John Gavin, La soldadera with Silvia Pinal, Jesús, nuestro Señor with Claudio Brook and Valente Quintero with Antonio Aguilar and Saby Kamalich. On television, Busquets had his debut in 1961 and continued to stay steady until 1988. He portrayed José María Morelos in the historical telenovela Los caudillos in 1968.

== Selected filmography ==
- Por mis pistolas (1938)
- The Coward (1939)
- Here's the Point (1940)
- The Unknown Policeman (1942)
- Another Dawn (1943)
- Father Morelos (1943)
- Cuando habla el corazón (1943)
- Red Rain (1950)
- Los años vacíos (1970)
- Del otro lado del puente (1980)
- Demonoid (1981)

== Dubbed roles ==
- The Great Mouse Detective – Ratigan
- Sleeping Beauty – Narrator (1st dub)
