= Christopher Columbus (1943 film) =

1943 film

- Directed by: José Díaz Morales
- Written by: José Díaz Morales
- Produced by: Francisco Hormaechea de la Sota
- Starring: Julio Villarreal; Consuelo Frank; Lina Montes
- Cinematography: Jack Draper
- Edited by: Mario del Río
- Music by: Rodolfo Halffter
- Production company: Columbus Films
- Distributed by: Columbia Pictures
- Release date: 24 June 1943
- Running time: 135 minutes
- Country: Mexico
- Language: Spanish

Christopher Columbus (Spanish: Cristóbal Colón) is a 1943 Mexican historical drama film directed by José Díaz Morales and starring Julio Villarreal, Consuelo Frank and Lina Montes. The film's sets were designed by the art director Manuel Fontanals. It is also known by the subtitle The Greatness of America (La grandeza de America).

== Cast ==
- Julio Villarreal as Cristóbal Colón
- Consuelo Frank as Reina Isabel la Católica
- Lina Montes as Beatriz
- José Baviera as Rey Fernando el Católico
- Carlos López Moctezuma as Bobadilla
- Andrés Novo as Fray Juan Pérez
- Manuel Arvide as Cardenal Mendoza
- Jesús Valero as Santangel
- Rafael María de Labra as Martín Alonso Pinzón
- Alejandro Cobo as Pedro
- Gloria Jordán as Tabernera

== Bibliography ==
- Noriega, Chon A. & Ricci, Steven. The Mexican Cinema Project. UCLA Film and Television Archive, 1994.
- Wilt, David E. The Mexican Filmography, 1916 through 2001. McFarland, 2024.
