= Gabriel Soria =

Mexican film director

- Born: Gabriel Soria Rosales; 20 March 1908; Mexico City, Mexico
- Died: 30 June 1971 (aged 63); Mexico City, Mexico
- Occupations: Director, Writer, Producer
- Years active: 1930–1944 (film)

Gabriel Soria (1908–1971) was a Mexican film director, screenwriter and producer. He was active during the Golden Age of Mexican Cinema. His film Come on Ponciano was screened at the 1938 Venice Film Festival where it was in contention for the Mussolini Cup.

== Selected filmography ==
- Chucho el Roto (1934)
- Martín Garatuza (1935)
- Los muertos hablan (1935)
- Come on Ponciano (1937)
- La bestia negra (1939)
- Casa de mujeres (1942)
- La Virgen morena (1942)
- The Lady of the Camellias (1944)

== Bibliography ==
- Alfaro, Eduardo de la Vega. Gabriel Soria, 1903-1971. Universidad de Guadalajara, 1992.
- Hershfield, Joanne; Maciel, David R. Mexico's Cinema: A Century of Film and Filmmakers. Rowman & Littlefield Publishers, 1999.
