= Virginia Serret =

Mexican actress (1914–1958)

- Born: 21 July 1914; Veracruz, Mexico
- Died: May 2, 1958 (aged 43); Mexico City, Mexico
- Occupation: Actress
- Years active: 1938 - 1952 (film)

Virginia Serret (1914-1958) was a Mexican film actress. She appeared in around thirty films during the Golden age of Mexican cinema. Serret was married to the Argentine actor Luis Aldás.

== Selected filmography ==
- Heads or Tails (1937)
- Poor Devil (1940)
- Con su amable permiso (1940)
- To the Sound of the Marimba (1941)
- Father Gets Entangled Again (1942)
- A Woman's Diary (1944)
- La Mujer sin Alma (1944)
- Porfirio Díaz (1944)
- The Hour of Truth (1945)
- Song of the Siren (1948)
- The Black Sheep (1949)
- It's a Sin to Be Poor (1950)

== Bibliography ==
- Wood, Andrew Grant. Agustin Lara: A Cultural Biography. Oxford University Press, 2014.
