= Gloria Lynch =

Chilean actress (1919–1993)

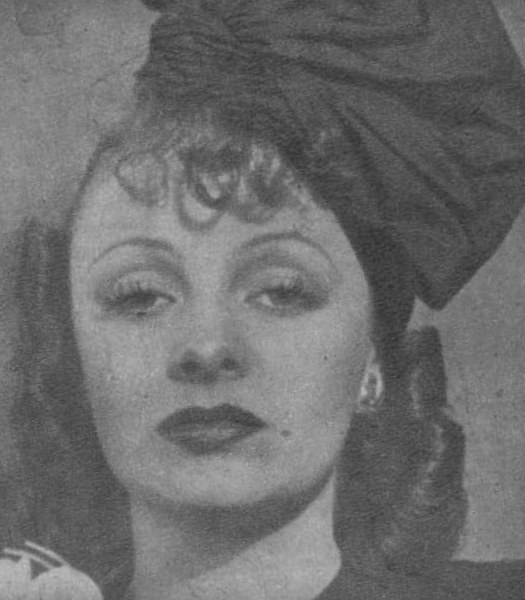
- Lynch circa 1941
- Born: Gloria Ligia Lynch Sonders; 20 December 1919; Santiago, Chile
- Died: 14 June 1993 (aged 73); Santiago, Chile
- Occupation: Actress

Gloria Ligia Lynch Sonders (20 December 1919 – 14 June 1993) was a Chilean actress.

== Biography ==
She was the daughter of Julio Lynch Canciani and Teresa Sonders.

She began her acting career in 1940, without any previous acting training, in the film Escándalo ("Scandal") directed by Jorge Délano Frederick. Following her participation in the film, she received an invitation to travel to the United States, where, apart from learning English, she studied singing, dancing and acting.

In 1941 she traveled to Mexico, where she performed alongside Cantinflas in the film The Circus (1943). That same year she starred in the film The Man in the Iron Mask by Marco Aurelio Galindo. In 1946 she participated in La mujer de todos, starring María Félix. That same year, she was part of the Teatro Libre of Mexico with the play Amores en la Montaña ("Love in the Mountain").

In 1946 she returned to Chile, participating in the national tour of Alejandro Flores's company. She also joined the radio, participating in the radio version of the melodrama El derecho de nacer ("The Right to be Born").

== Filmography ==
- Escándalo (1940)
- The Circus (1943)
- The Man in the Iron Mask (1943)
- La mujer de todos (1946)
- The Idol (1952)

== Bibliography ==
- Muñoz, Ernesto. Diccionario del cine iberoamericano; SGAE, 2011.
