= Mexicanos, al grito de guerra (film) =

- Directed by: Álvaro Gálvez y Fuentes; Ismael Rodríguez
- Written by: Elvira de la Mora; Álvaro Gálvez y Fuentes; Joselito Rodríguez
- Starring: Pedro Infante; Lina Montes; Miguel Inclán
- Cinematography: Ezequiel Carrasco
- Music by: Raúl Lavista
- Production company: Producciones Rodríguez Hermanos
- Release date: 1943
- Running time: 101 minutes

Mexicanos, al grito de guerra (English: Mexicans, to the Cry of War) is a 1943 historical drama movie produced in Mexico starring Pedro Infante. The main story revolves around a soldier, a woman, love and an impending war.

== Plot ==
The film opens in the mid 1860s and Napoleon III (Sala) is gearing up towards an invasion of Mexico by French forces, although he's not completely sure where it is. General Almonte informs him that they will have to cross the Atlantic Ocean to get there. It is now circa 1854 and Antonio Lopez de Santa Anna announces that he is holding a competition to write the national anthem of Mexico to and Poet Francisco González Bocanegra (Riquelme) is urged to write the lyrics of the anthem by his cousin, Lupe (Cortés), to write the lyrics to the anthem, however Bocanegra feels that the lyrics need to be grand and solemn as well as unite people as brothers. He doesn't feel that he is the right person to do that since his poetry is more romantic and not patriotic. Lt. Luis Sandoval (Infante), who is a trumpet player, suggests that Spaniard Jaime Nuno (Carrasco) compose the music to the national anthem, however Nuno feels he is the least qualified, and counters that the lyrics haven't been written yet.

Lupe locks Bocanegra in a room and refuses to let him out until he's written the lyrics to the national anthem, but he insists he will not write it. After he sees several items in the room that instill patriotism, he finally sits down to attempt to write. Days later he slips the manuscript under the door, and Lupe and her father agree to let him out. Nuno receives a copy of Bocanegra's lyrics and is inspired to compose the music. Luis meets and falls in love with Esther Dubois (Montes) who is the daughter of the French ambassador, Count Dubois of Saligny. Esther and her friends plan to go to the Paseo de las Cadenas that evening. By chance, Luis and his friend see Esther at the park and he sings to her. Her friend tosses a coin to Luis, who tries to give it back but the man insists he keep it. Luis accepts but regrets that he can't give the man change, and insinuates that the man needs it more than Luis does.

President Santa Anna (Quiroz) needs to raise funds to cover the costs of the additional military personnel, he imposes a tax on the number of windows and doors that face the street, which prompts city residents to seal windows and roos with brick, to reduce the amount of taxes they will have to pay.

In one battle where the Mexican forces were near the brink of defeat Luis decides to grab a trumpet and play the song "Mexicanos, al grito de guerra", the national anthem of Mexico. Upon hearing it played, the Mexican soldiers rally and overcome the French forces. However, Luis is shot and dies in the end at the same time his love escapes imprisonment.

== Cast list ==
- Pedro Infante - Lt. Luis Sandoval
- Lina Montes - Esther Dubois
- Miguel Arenas - Conde Dubois de Saligny
- Miguel Ángel Ferriz - Gen. Ignacio Zaragoza
- Miguel Inclán - President Benito Juárez
- Armando Soto La Marina - Pastelero (as Chicote)
- Salvador Carrasco - Jaime Nunó
- Margarita Cortés - Lupe
- Carlos Riquelme - Francisco González Bocanegra
- Francisco Jambrina - Gen. Juan Prim
- Manuel Arvide - Gen. Lorencez
- Eduardo Arozamena
- Guillermo Nuñez K.
- Salvador Quiroz - Antonio López de Santa Anna
- Arturo Soto Rangel - Sandoval, Papá de Lt. Luis Sandoval
- Roberto Corell
- Ramón G. Larrea - Gen. Jurien
- José Goula - Mr. Wyckie
- Teresa Vega
- Pedro Elviro - Lombardini (as Pitouto)
- Angel T. Sala - Napoleon III
- Ramón Larrea
- Max Langler
- Manuel Noriega Ruiz (as Manuel Noriega)
- José Soula
- Ignacio Peon
- Ricardo Carti - Gen. Almonte
- Armando Gutiérrez
