= Margarita Mora =

- Born: 31 December 1920; Santo Domingo, Dominican Republic
- Died: 27 April 1976 (aged 55); Mexico City, Mexico
- Occupation: Actress
- Years active: 1934–1943 (film)

Margarita Mora (1920–1976) was a Dominican dancer and film actress who became known for her roles in the Golden Age of Mexican cinema.

== Selected filmography ==
- Heads or Tails (1937)
- Poppy of the Road (1937)
- The Cemetery of the Eagles (1939)
- Simón Bolívar (1942)
- El Ametralladora (1943)
- Land of Passions (1943)

== Bibliography ==
- Joanne Hershfield. The Invention of Dolores Del Rio. U of Minnesota Press, 2000.
