= Esther Fernández =

Mexican actress (1915–1999)

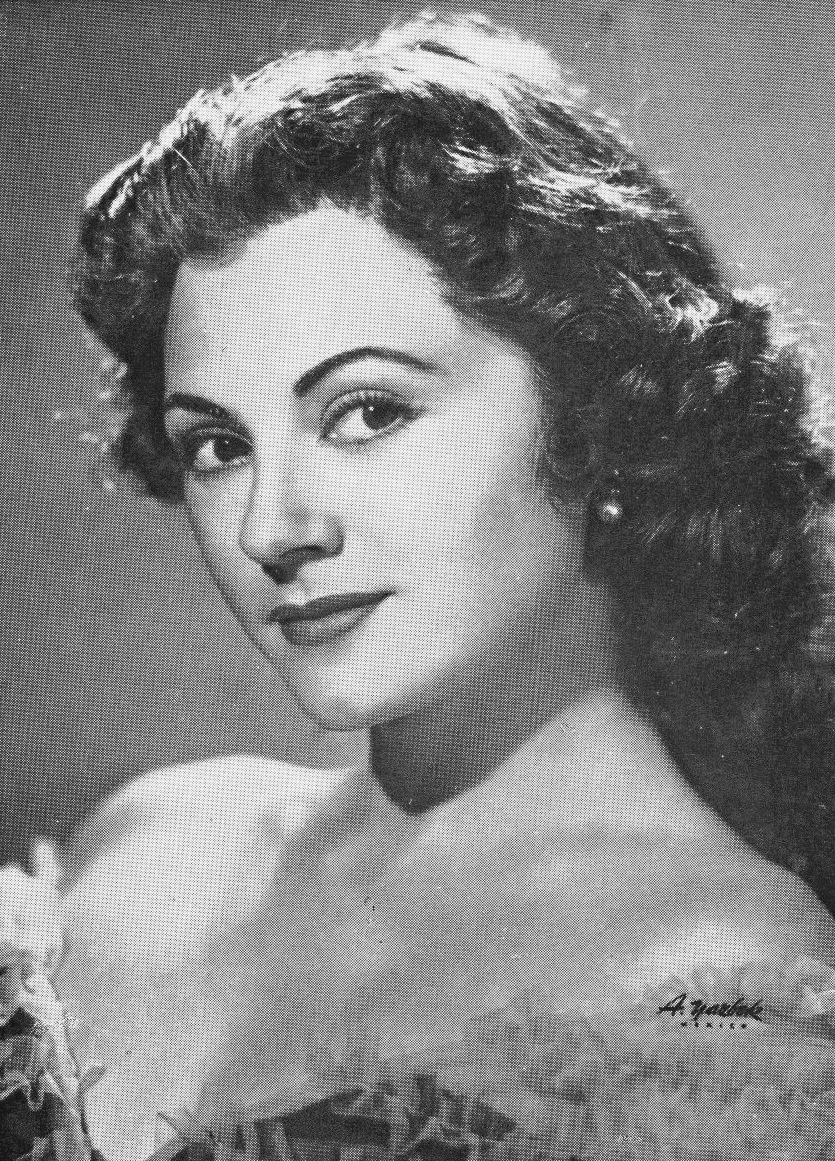
- Fernández in 1954
- Born: María Esther Fernández González; August 23, 1915; Mascota, Jalisco Mexico
- Died: October 21, 1999 (aged 84); Mexico City, Mexico
- Occupation: Film actress
- Years active: 1933–1997

María Esther Fernández González (23 August 1915 – 21 October 1999) was a Mexican actress.

== Life and career ==
Esther Fernández began her career as an extra in the film La Mujer del Puerto (1934). Her first starring role was in the early horror film El baúl macabro (Miguel Zacarías, 1936). Her beauty and charisma drew the attention of film director Fernando de Fuentes, who gave her the female lead role of Crucita in the rural musical Allá en el rancho Grande (1936), opposite Tito Guizar. Some critics consider the unexpected success of this film throughout Latin America as marking the start of the Golden Age of Mexican cinema.

During the rest of the 1930s, Fernández played mostly ingénues in movies like Mi candidato (1938), with Joaquín Pardavé and Pedro Armendàriz, and Los de abajo (1939), with Isabela Corona and Emilio Fernández. She caught the attention of Paramount Pictures, which had already contracted Tito Guizar, and earned her a contract to work in Hollywood. Though she trained for two years as a starlet, the Paramount studio executives never cast her in a movie and she returned to Mexico.

In 1943 Fernández was cast to play the title character in the second sound version of the classic Mexican film Santa, directed by Norman Foster and co-starring Ricardo Montalbán, then at the start of his film career. The couple and the director reunited to make The Escape (1944), based on a Guy de Maupassant story. In 1946 Fernández was finally able to star in a Paramount film Two Years Before the Mast. She played a Mexican-American woman returning to California from Spain for an arranged marriage. However, although it was the only important female character, the adventure film focused on the male cast, headed by Alan Ladd and Brian Donlevy.

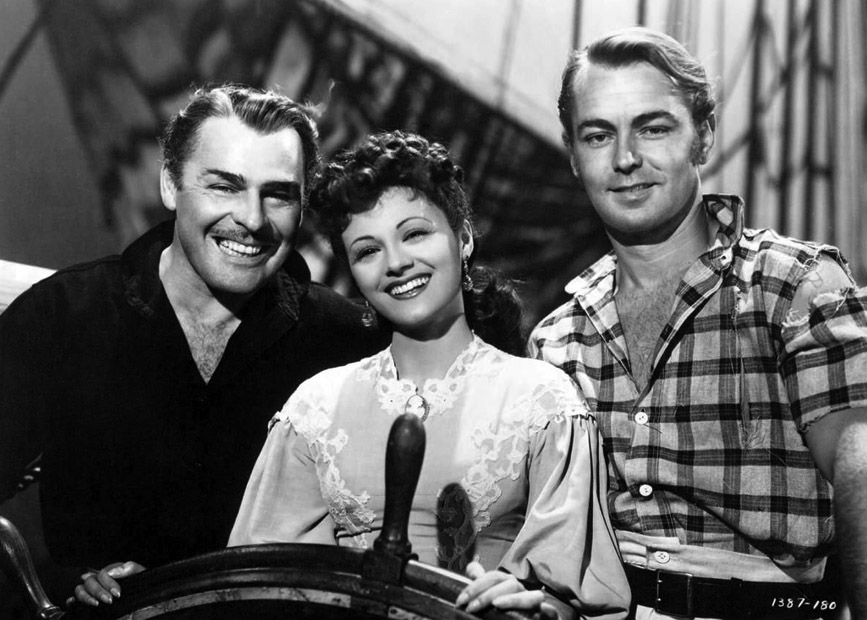
Fernández with Brian Donlevy and Alan Ladd in Two Years Before the Mast (1946).

Fernández continued her career in Mexico, starring in films like Flor de durazno (1945), Ramona (1946), Cantaclaro (1947), Solo Veracruz es Bello (1948), Doña Perfecta (1950), playing the daughter of Dolores del Rio, and Los Hijos del Rancho Grande (1956).

Fernández became romantically involved with the actor and singer Antonio Badú and during this period often co-starred with him.

She was absent from acting for two years, due to hepatitis. When she returned, the producers had forgotten her and stopped offering her movies. During her retirement years, she was dedicated to painting.

In 1989, Fernández returned to stardom in the Mexican telenovela Simplemente María. In 1992, she returned to the cinema with the film Los Años de Greta, opposite Beatriz Aguirre and Meche Barba. Her last appearance was in the film Reclusorio II (1997).

Fernández died of natural causes in 1999.

== Partial filmography ==
- La Mujer del Puerto (1934)
- El baúl macabro (1936)
- Allá en el Rancho Grande (1936)
- Judas (1936)
- Poppy of the Road (1937)
- Mi candidato (1938)
- Los de abajo (1939)
- Santa (1943)
- The Escape (1944)
- Prisión de sueños (1946)
- Ramona (1946)
- Cantaclaro (1946)
- Two Years Before the Mast (1946)
- Strange Appointment (1947)
- The Shadow of the Bridge (1948)
- The Flesh Commands (1948)
- Only Veracruz Is Beautiful (1949)
- Doña Perfecta (1951)
- Victims of Divorce (1952)
- Genius and Figure (1953)
- The Spot of the Family (1953)
- Los hijos del Rancho Grande (1956)
- Every Child a Cross to Bear (1957)
- Simplemente María (TV) (1989)
- Los Años de Greta (1992)
- Reclusorio II (1997)

== Bibliography ==
- Agrasánchez Jr., Rogelio (2001). Bellezas del cine mexicano/Beauties of Mexican Cinema. Archivo Fílmico Agrasánchez. ISBN 968-5077-11-8.
