= Father's Entanglements =

1939 film

- Directed by: Miguel Zacarías
- Written by: Antonio Guzmán Aguilera; Miguel Zacarías
- Produced by: Miguel Zacarías
- Starring: Leopoldo Ortín; Sara García; Julián Soler
- Cinematography: Alex Phillips
- Edited by: Miguel Zacarías
- Music by: Manuel Esperón
- Production company: Cinematográfica Miguel Zacarías
- Release date: 15 July 1939
- Running time: 98 minutes
- Country: Mexico
- Language: Spanish

Father's Entanglements (Spanish: Los enredos de papá) is a 1939 Mexican comedy film directed by Miguel Zacarías and starring Leopoldo Ortín, Sara García and Julián Soler. The film's sets were designed by the art director José Rodríguez Granada. It was followed by a sequel Father Gets Entangled Again in 1942.

== Cast ==
- Leopoldo Ortín as Crisóforo
- Sara García as Petra
- Julián Soler as El hijo mayor
- Miguel Montemayor as Lalito
- Victoria Blanco as La vedette
- Blanca Rosa Otero
- Ángel T. Sala
- Eufrosina García
- José Torvay

== Bibliography ==
- Amador, María Luisa. Cartelera cinematográfica, 1930-1939. Filmoteca, UNAM, 1980.
- Richard, Alfred. Censorship and Hollywood's Hispanic image: an interpretive filmography, 1936-1955. Greenwood Press, 1993.
