= Tomás Perrín =

Mexican actor (1914–1985)

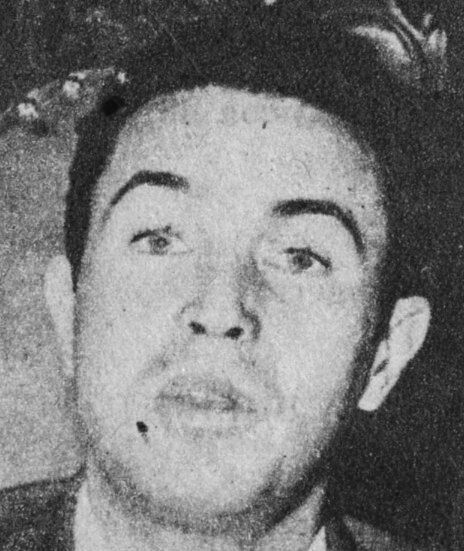
- Tomás Perrín in 1945
- Born: 4 January 1914; Mexico City, Mexico
- Died: 10 May 1985 (aged 71); Mexico City, Mexico
- Occupation: Actor
- Years active: 1939–1960 (film)

Tomás Perrín (January 4, 1914 – May 10, 1985) was a Mexican film actor. He appeared with María Félix in the historical film The White Monk in 1945.

== Filmography ==
| Year | Title | Role | Notes |
|---|---|---|---|
| 1939 | Su adorable majadero | Félix Mariscal | |
| 1939 | Café Concordia | Ernesto de la Fuente | |
| 1939 | El signo de la muerte | Carlos Manzano | |
| 1940 | La locura de Don Juan | | |
| 1940 | Madre a la fuerza | Arturo Morales | |
| 1941 | El hijo de Cruz Diablo | | |
| 1941 | La casa del rencor | Héctor | |
| 1942 | Las cinco noches de Adán | Chucho Orozco | |
| 1943 | Tentación | | |
| 1943 | La hija del cielo | Serafín | |
| 1944 | El rosario | Garth | |
| 1944 | Cuando escuches este vals | | |
| 1944 | El rey se divierte | | |
| 1945 | The White Monk | Conde Hugo del Saso / Fray Paracleto | |
| 1946 | Amor de una vida | Carlos Landa | |
| 1956 | El hombre que quiso ser pobre | Periodista | |
| 1960 | La sombra del Caudillo | Diputado Axcaná González | (final film role) |

== Bibliography ==
- Paco Ignacio Taibo. María Félix: 47 pasos por el cine. Bruguera, 2008.
