= Lina Montes =

Cuban actress

- Born: 1 January 1923; Havana, Cuba
- Died: 2 October 1984 (aged 61); Mexico City, Mexico
- Occupation: Actress
- Years active: 1939–1981 (film)

Lina Montes (1 January 1923–October 2, 1984) was a Cuban film actress known for her roles in Mexican cinema. She appeared in several prominent roles during the Golden Age of Mexican Cinema. She was nominated for Best Supporting Actress at the 16th Ariel Awards.

== Selected filmography ==
- Christopher Columbus (1943)
- Mexicanos, al grito de guerra (1943)
- The Lady of the Camellias (1944)
- La mujer que engañamos (1945)
- The Mulatta of Cordoba (1945)
- Autumn and Spring (1949)
- Viento salvaje (1974)
- La presidenta municipal (1975)
- La venida del Rey Olmos (1975)
- The Divine Caste (1977)

== Bibliography ==
- Irwin, Robert & Ricalde, Maricruz. Global Mexican Cinema: Its Golden Age. British Film Institute, 2013.
- Paranaguá, Paulo Antonio. Mexican Cinema. British Film Institute, 1995.
