= Lightning in the South =

1943 film

- Directed by: Miguel Contreras Torres
- Written by: Miguel Contreras Torres
- Produced by: Miguel Contreras Torres
- Starring: Domingo Soler; Dolores Camarillo; Consuelo Frank
- Cinematography: Alex Phillips
- Edited by: Jorge Bustos; Juan José Marino; Gloria Schoemann
- Music by: Miguel Bernal Jiménez
- Production company: Hispano Continental Films
- Release date: 30 September 1943
- Running time: 100 minutes
- Country: Mexico
- Language: Spanish

Lightning in the South (Spanish: El rayo del sur) is a 1943 Mexican historical drama film directed by Miguel Contreras Torres and starring Domingo Soler, Dolores Camarillo and Consuelo Frank. It was shot at the Azteca Studios in Mexico City. The film's sets were designed by the art director Luis Moya. Inspired by the life of José María Morelos and the Mexican War of Independence, it is the sequel to Father Morelos.

== Cast ==
- Domingo Soler as José María Morelos y Pavón
- Carlos López Moctezuma as Hermenegildo Galeana
- Dolores Camarillo as María Barragán
- Consuelo Frank as María Antonia Morelos
- Estela Inda
- Miguel Arenas as Comandante Vélez
- Ramón Vallarino as Mariano Matamoros
- Víctor Urruchúa as Nicolas Bravo
- Antonio R. Frausto as Gregorio Zapien
- Arturo Soto Rangel as Leonardo Bravo
- Francisco Jambrina as Félix María Calleja del Rey
- José Baviera as Manuel de la Concha
- Antonio Bravo as Coronel José Gabriel de Armijo
- Miguel Inclán as Macario García
- Alejandro Cobo as Tomás Montero
- Agustín Sen as Doctor Flores
- Luis Mussot as Francisco Xavier Venegas
- Luis Alcoriza as Soldado realista
- Rafael María de Labra as José Gago
- Marichu Labra as María Francisca de la Gándara de Calleja
- Manuel Dondé as Valerio Trujano

== Bibliography ==
- Niblo, Stephen R. Mexico in the 1940s: Modernity, Politics, and Corruption. Rowman & Littlefield, 1999.
- Riera, Emilio García. Historia documental del cine mexicano: 1943-1945. Universidad de Guadalajara, 1992.
