= Miguel Zacarías =

Mexican film director, producer and writer

- Born: Miguel Zacarías Nogaim; 19 March 1905; Mexico City, Mexico
- Died: 20 April 2006 (aged 101); Cuernavaca, Morelos, Mexico
- Occupations: film director, film producer, screenwriter
- Years active: 1933—86

Miguel Zacarías Nogaim (19 March 1905 – 20 April 2006) was a Mexican film director, producer, and writer.

== Career ==
Zacarías began directing for film in 1933. Even from his early career he developed a reputation for recognizing new acting talent; he promoted the careers of the some of Mexico's most notable actors including Pedro Armendáriz in Rosario (1935), María Félix, Marga López, Esther Fernández, Pedro Infante, Tin Tan, Cantinflas, and Manuel Medel.

His 1961 film Juana Gallo was entered into the 2nd Moscow International Film Festival. Zacarías directed his last film in 1986. His son is film director Alfredo Zacarias. His granddaughter is playwright Karen Zacarias.

== Biography ==
Miguel Zacarías Nogaim was born to Elías Melhem Zacarías and María Nogaim, who immigrated to Mexico in 1905 and soon thereafter received Mexican citizenship. His generally accepted birth year is 1905, although some sources show him being born in 1908.

Zacarías attended primary school in Mexico City and secondary school in the United States. He traveled to Lebanon for university studies; while there he became fluent in French, Italian, and Arabic; he also immersed himself in French literature.

In 1927 Zacarías returned to Mexico City, and started a real-estate business. He had always been a fan of movies, and seeing the appearance of talkies at the end of 1927, he began looking for ways to enter the business himself. He submitted several screenplays without success, so he moved to the United States to pursue his dream. He studied directing, composition, photography, scenography and dramatic arts at Columbia University.

He worked in New York City in Malcom Laboratories, where he made several significant acquaintances from the cinematic world. Zacarías returned to Mexico in 1932 and with his brother founded the production company Latino Films. He produced, directed and edited Sobre las Olas. He then partnered with Juan Bustillo Oro and Fernando de Fuentes to found the production company Grovas y Diana Films. He developed an efficient directing method - having the screenplays recorded beforehand, so he could quickly work with actors to improve their approach and technique. He worked with Mario Moreno Cantinflas, Emilio Azcárraga Vidaurreta, and Howard Hughes to construct Los Estudios Churubusco.

== Other works ==
In spite of his considerable cinematographic work, Zacarías always considered himself a writer. He produced some 130 novels, 250 short stories, 27 theatrical works, poetry, and essays touching on philosophy and politics. He wrote one ballet, La Princesa Europea.

== Death ==
He died in his sleep at the age of 101 in Cuernavaca, Morelos, of heart failure.

== Legacy ==
Zacarías was proud of Mexico, and worked tirelessly to bring its identity and heritage to public attention. The story is told of Zacarías that, while in Europe he heard a waltz being played, a creation of Mexican composer Juventino Rosas. When he suggested that it was a Mexican tune, he was told by his European friends, "Impossible - no Mexican could have composed that". Incensed, he returned to Mexico, wrote a novel based on the life of Rosas, and produced a movie bearing the title of a famous Rosas composition, Sobre las Olas (1933).

Zacarías's films frequently focused on themes of Mexican national identity and cultural heritage.

== Honors and recognition ==
In 1993 Zacarías received the Gold Ariel award at the XXXV Ceremonia de Entrega del Ariel. In 2001 he was given the Salvador Toscano Medal.

== Selected filmography ==
=== Producer ===
- Demonoid, Messenger of Death (1981)
- I Escaped from Devil's Island (1973)
- Doctor on Call (1950)
- Here Comes Martin Corona (1952)
- Escuela de música (1955)
- Peñón de las Ánimas, El (1943)
- Cuidado con el amor (1954)
- Capulina contra los vampiros (1971)
- El pecado de Adán y Eva (1969)
- Espérame en Siberia, vida mía (1971)
- Dolor de pagar la renta, El (1960)
- Marquesa del barrio, La (1951)
- Odalisca No. 13, La (1958)
- Ven a cantar conmigo (1967)
- Rebelde sin casa (1960)
- Tres lecciones de amor (1959)
- Loca, La (1952)
- Among Lawyers I See You (1951)

=== Director ===
- Rosario (1935)
- Father's Entanglements (1939)
- If I'm to Be Killed Tomorrow (1947)
- Here Comes Martin Corona (1952)
- Ansiedad (1953)
- Escuela de música (1955)
- The Rock of Souls (1942)
- Father Gets Entangled Again (1942)
- Cuidado con el amor (1954)
- Enamorado, El (1952)
- Necesito dinero (1952)
- Juana Gallo (1961)
- Pecado de Adán y Eva, El (1967)
- Si me han de matar mañana (1947)
- Marquesa del barrio, La (1951)
- Carta de amor, Una (1943)
- Loca, La (1952)
- Me he de comer esa tuna (1945)
- Jesús, el niño Dios (1970)
- Jesús, María y José (1970)
- Jesús, nuestro Señor (1969)

=== Writer ===
- Ansiedad (1953)
- Escuela de música (1955)
- Peñón de las Ánimas, El (1943)
- Cuidado con el amor (1954)
- Enamorado, El (1952)
- Necesito dinero (1952)
- Juana Gallo (1961)
- Pecado de Adán y Eva, El (1969)
- Si me han de matar mañana (1947)
- Marquesa del barrio, La (1951)
- Loca, La (1952)
- Me he de comer esa tuna (1945)
- Carta de amor, Una (1943)
- Jesús, el niño Dios (1970)
