= Arcady Boytler =

Russian-born Mexican film producer, director and screenwriter

- Boytler in 1917
- Born: Arcady Sergeevich Boytler Rososky; August 31, 1895; Moscow, Russian Empire
- Died: November 24, 1965 (aged 70); Mexico City, Mexico
- Occupation(s): Film producer and director, screenwriter

Arcady Sergeevich Boytler Rososky (August 31, 1895 – November 24, 1965) was a Russian-born Mexican film producer, director and screenwriter, most renowned for his films during the golden age of Mexican cinema.

Boytler was born in Moscow, lived on Riga (Elizabetas 12) since 1895 till 1914. Had a Latvian citizenship from 1917 till 1934. During the 1920s, he started filming silent comedies. A collaborator of Sergei Eisenstein, he was called "the Russian Rooster" when he came to Mexico to film La mujer del puerto (1933). In 1937 he filmed ¡Así es mi tierra!, which followed the model of Fernando de Fuentes's classic Allá en el Rancho Grande. However, the film subverted the Mexican Revolutionary genre by making the general into the villain.

Boytler died of heart disease in the Mexican Federal District on November 24, 1965, at the age of 70.

== Filmography ==
=== Cinema of Mexico ===
- Como yo te quería (1944) producer
- Amor prohibido (1944) director, producer and screenwriter
- Una luz en mi camino (1938) (special appearance)
- El capitán aventurero (Don Gil de Alcalá) (1938) director and screenwriter
- Heads or Tails (1937) director and screenwriter
- ¡Así es mi tierra! (1937) director and screenwriter
- Celos (1935) director, screenwriter, and editor
- El tesoro de Pancho Villa (1935) director, screenwriter, and editor
- Revista musical (1934) director (short subject)
- La mujer del puerto (1933) director and supervising editor
- Joyas de México (Gems of Mexico) (1933) director (series of three short films)
- Mano a mano (1932) director and screenwriter
- Un espectador impertinente (1932) director, actor and screenwriter (short subject)
- ¡Que viva México! (1930–32) extra (during the party scene)

=== Cinema of Chile ===
- El buscador de fortuna (No hay que desanimarse) (1927) director and actor

=== Cinema of Germany ===
- Boytler Tötet Langeweile (Boytler contra el aburrimiento/Pasatiempos de Boytler/Boytler against boredom) (ca. 1922) actor and director
- Boytler gegen Chaplin (Boytler contra Chaplin/Boytler against Chaplin) (ca. 1920) actor and director (short subject)

=== Cinema of Russia ===
- Arkadij Controller Spalnych Vagonov (ca. 1915) actor and director
- Arkadij Zhenitsa (ca. 1915) actor and director
- Arkadij Sportsman (ca. 1915) actor and director
