= Father Gets Entangled Again =

1942 film

- Directed by: Miguel Zacarías
- Written by: Miguel Zacarías
- Produced by: Miguel Zacarías
- Starring: Sara García; Leopoldo Ortín; Virginia Serret
- Cinematography: Alex Phillips
- Edited by: Jorge Bustos
- Music by: Armando Rosales
- Production company: Producciones Zacarías
- Release date: 24 April 1942
- Running time: 101 minutes
- Country: Mexico
- Language: Spanish

Father Gets Entangled Again (Spanish: Papá se enreda otra vez) is a 1942 Mexican comedy film directed by Miguel Zacarías and starring Sara García, Leopoldo Ortín and Virginia Serret. The film's sets were designed by the art director Carlos Toussaint. It is a sequel to the 1939 film Los enredos de papá.

== Cast ==
- Sara García as Petra
- Leopoldo Ortín
- Miguel Montemayor
- Virginia Serret
- Antonio R. Frausto
- Virginia Zurí
- Blanca Rosa Otero
- Ángel T. Sala
- Chel López
- Luis G. Barreiro
- Eufrosina García

== Bibliography ==
- Agrasánchez, Rogelio. Miguel Zacarías: creador de estrellas. Universidad de Guadalajara, 2000.
