= Santa (1943 film) =

1943 film by Norman Foster

- Directed by: Norman Foster
- Written by: Federico Gamboa (novel); Francisco Cabrera; Alfredo B. Crevenna
- Produced by: Francisco Cabrera
- Starring: Esther Fernández; José Cibrián; Ricardo Montalbán
- Cinematography: Agustín Martínez Solares
- Edited by: Charles L. Kimball
- Music by: Gonzalo Curiel; Mario Ruiz Armengol
- Production company: Minerva Film
- Release date: 10 June 1943
- Running time: 111 minutes
- Country: Mexico
- Language: Spanish

Santa is a 1943 Mexican romantic drama film directed by Norman Foster and Alfredo Gómez de la Vega. This Spanish-language film stars Esther Fernández, José Cibrián, and Ricardo Montalbán. It was shot at the Azteca Studios in Mexico City. The film's sets were designed by the art directors Gunther Gerszo and Carlos Toussaint.

== Cast ==
- Esther Fernández as Santa
- José Cibrián as Hipólito
- Ricardo Montalban as Jarameño
- Estela Inda as Raquel
- Víctor Manuel Mendoza as Marcelino
- Emma Roldán as Pepa
- Manuel Arvide as Rubio
- Fanny Schiller as Elvira Gómez
- Elías Haber as Jenarillo
- Florencio Castelló as Vallejo
- Carolina Barret as Flora
- Jesús Valero as Bruno, mozo de Estoques
- Eugenia Galindo as Nicasia
- Tito Novaro as Manuel de la Torre, poeta
- María del Carmen Ferriz as Madre de Santa
- Icaro Cisneros as Fabián - hermano de Santa
- María Porras as Eufrosia
- Alfonso Ruiz Gómez as Hermano de Santa
- Aurora Zermeño as Prostituta

== Bibliography ==
- Riera, Emilio García. Historia documental del cine mexicano: 1951-1952. Universidad de Guadalajara, 1992.
