= Consuelo Frank =

Mexican actress (1912–1991)

- Consuelo Frank in El indio (1939)
- Born: Consuelo Frank Galza; 25 April 1912; Arteaga, Michoacán, Mexico
- Died: 31 March 1991 (aged 78); Mexico City, Mexico
- Occupation: Actress
- Years active: 1935–1987
- Children: 1

Consuelo Frank Galza (25 April 1912 – 31 March 1991), sometimes credited as Consuelito Frank, was a Mexican actress who played leading roles in the 1930s and 1940s and supporting roles from the early 1950s to the 1980s.

== Career ==
Born in Arteaga, Michoacán, she made her acting debut in the stage as part of Chato Ortín's theatrical company. Her film debut came in Tierra, amor y dolor (1935), co-starring Domingo Soler. Her refined beauty and regal bearing caused her to be typecast as noblewomen and queens, such as Elisabeth Farnese in Rosa de Francia (1935), Anne of Austria in Los tres mosqueteros (1942), and the Viceroy's wife in Macario (1960). She died in 1991, at the age of 78.

== Filmography ==
- La boda de Rosario (1929, uncredited)
- Land, Love and Suffering (1935)
- Clemencia (1935)
- Monja casada, vírgen y mártir (1935)
- Dreams of Love (1935)
- La familia Dressel (1935)
- Rosa de Francia (1935)
- A Wife's Calvary (1936)
- El superloco (1937)
- Nostradamus (1937)
- Come on Ponciano (1937)
- La tierra del mariachi (1938)
- An Old Love (1938)
- El indio (1939)
- Horse for Horse (1939)
- Una luz en mi camino (1939)
- A Macabre Legacy (1940)
- Los dos pilletes (1942)
- The Count of Monte Cristo (1942)
- Los tres mosqueteros (1942)
- Father Morelos (1943)
- Christopher Columbus (1943)
- Lightning in the South (1943)
- La malagueña (1947)
- The Martyr of Calvary (1952)
- The Three Perfect Wives (1953)
- Ay... Calypso no te rajes! (1958)
- Fiesta en el corazón (1958)
- The Black Whip (1958)
- The Mystery of the Black Whip (1958)
- Ama a tu prójimo (1958)
- Mi niño, mi caballo y yo (1959)
- Hanged Man's Soul Against the Black Whip (1959)
- La reina del cielo (1959)
- La nave de los monstruos (1960)
- Verano violento (1960)
- La sombra en defensa de la juventud (1960)
- Macario (1960)
- Las tres coquetonas (1960)
- Two Cheap Husbands (1960)
- Los laureles (1961)
- La sombra blanca (1963)
- The Fight for Glory (1964)
- El solitario (1964)
- So Loved Our Fathers (1964)
- Duelo en el desierto (1964)
- Me llaman el cantaclaro (1964)
- Rateros último modelo (1965)
- Corazón salvaje (1968)

== Partial television work ==
- Corazón salvaje (1977 TV series)
