= María Luisa Zea =

Mexican actress and singer (1913–2002)

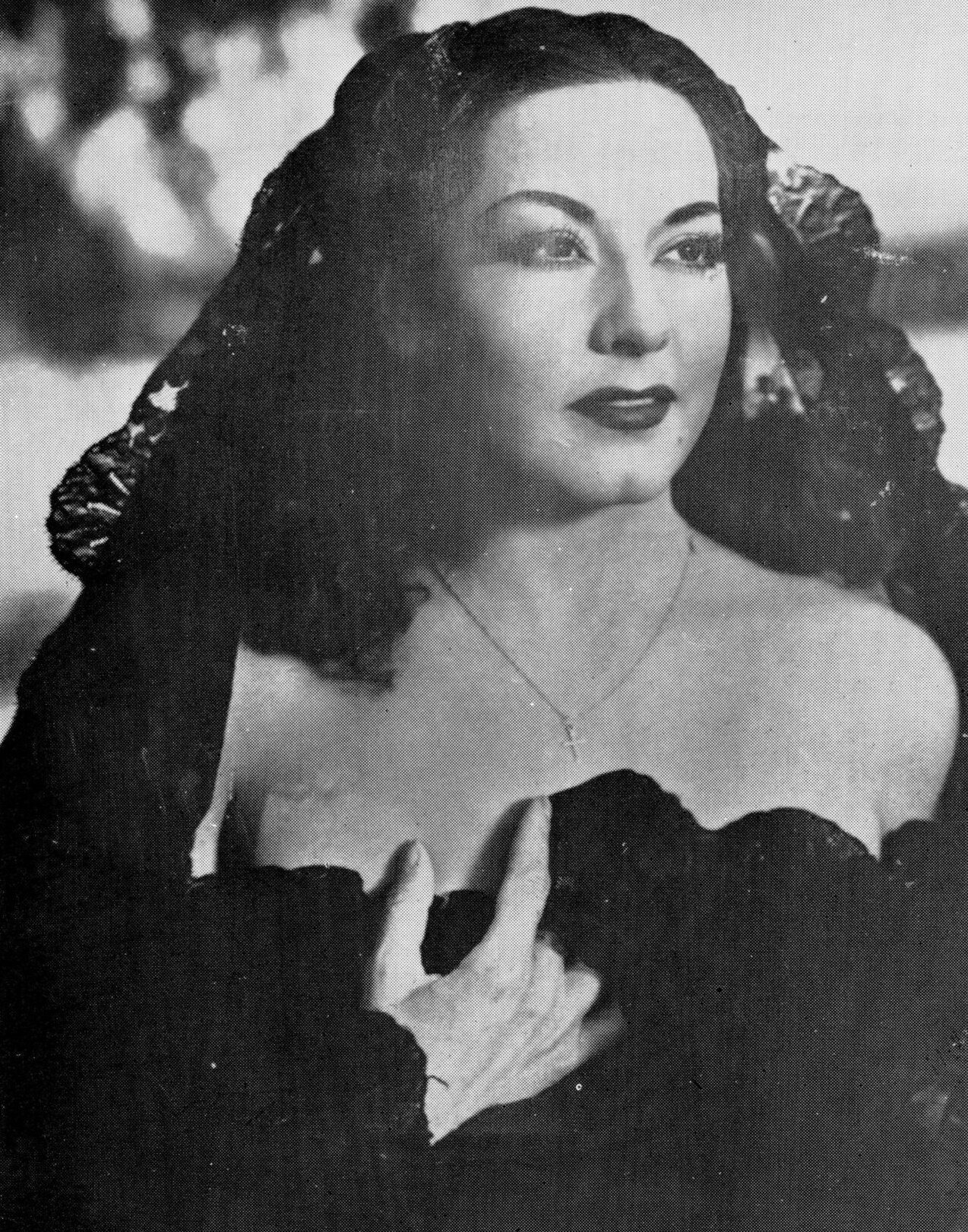
- María Luisa Zea in 1954
- Born: 5 February 1913; Mexico City, Mexico
- Died: 27 December 2002 (aged 89); Mexico City, Mexico
- Occupations: Actor, singer
- Years active: 1933–1957
- Spouse: Arnaldo Flores García

María Luisa Zea (5 February 1913 – 27 December 2002) was a Mexican actress and singer of the Golden Age of Mexican cinema. In her career spanning 24 years, she appeared in over 50 motion pictures.

== Selected filmography ==
- La Llorona (1933)
- Sanctuary (1933)
- La noche del pecado (1933)
- Juarez and Maximillian (1934)
- Martín Garatuza (1935)
- Bajo el cielo de Mexico (1937)
- La Zandunga (1938)
- Una luz en mi camino (1939)
- Cuando habla el corazón (1943)
- My Lupe and My Horse (1944)
- El corsario negro (1944)
- El jagüey de las ruinas (1944)
- El Gran campeón (1949)
- Yo maté a Juan Charrasqueado (1949)
- They Say I'm a Communist (1951)
