= Las aventuras de Pito Pérez =

- Directed by: Juan Bustillo Oro
- Written by: María Luisa Algarra (additional dialogue); Juan Bustillo Oro (additional dialogue); Fernando de Fuentes (adaptation)
- Based on: La vida inútil de Pito Pérez by José Rubén Romero
- Produced by: Fernando de Fuentes
- Starring: Germán Valdés
- Cinematography: Enrique Wallace
- Edited by: Carlos Savage
- Music by: Luis Hernández Bretón
- Release date: 27 February 1957 (Mexico)
- Country: Mexico
- Language: Spanish

Las aventuras de Pito Pérez ("The Adventures of Pito Pérez") is a 1957 Mexican drama comedy film directed by Juan Bustillo Oro and starring Germán Valdés "Tin-Tan" and Anabelle Gutiérrez. This film is based on the 1938 novel La vida inútil de Pito Pérez by José Rubén Romero.

In 2012, in the 60th anniversary of José Rubén Romero's death, the film was shown in the Manuel M. Ponce Hall of the Palacio de Bellas Artes in Mexico City.

== Plot ==
After a long absence, Pito Pérez (Germán Valdés), a homeless man, returns to his village and recounts all his adventures.

== Cast ==
- Germán Valdés "Tin-Tan" as Jesús Pérez Gaona "Pito Pérez"
- Anabelle Gutiérrez as Chucha (as Anabel Gutierrez)
- Andrés Soler as Señor del Rincón
- Consuelo Guerrero de Luna as Doña Jovita
- Eduardo Alcaraz as Padre Pureco
- Marcelo Chávez as Don J. de J. Jiménez, apothecary (as Marcelo)
- Óscar Ortiz de Pinedo as Don Santiago Bolaños
- Lupe Inclán as Pelagia, nurse
- Guillermo Bravo Sosa as Gayosso's patient
- José Jasso as Dr. Gayosso
- Rafael Estrada as Don Pepe
- José Ortega as Don Goyo, barman
- Ramón Valdés as Truck Driver
- Amalia Gama as Doña Refugito
- Stephen Berne as Prisoner (uncredited)
- Carlos Bravo y Fernández as Gayosso's patient (uncredited)
- Lupe Carriles as Doña Huicha (uncredited)
- José Chávez as Don Ruperto (uncredited)
- Enedina Díaz de León as Angry bakery client (uncredited)
- Paquito Fernández as Boy who buys liquor (uncredited)
- Conchita Gentil Arcos as Spectator of false missionary (uncredited)
- Leonor Gómez as Tortilla seller (uncredited)
- Elodia Hernández as Doña Cholita (uncredited)
- Guillermo Hernández as Anticlerical prisoner (uncredited)
- Vicente Lara as Prisoner (uncredited)
- Ramón G. Larrea as Don Lino, baker (uncredited)
- Blanca Marroquín as Apothecary client (uncredited)
- José Muñoz as Religious prisoner (uncredited)
- Pepe Nava as Policeman (uncredited)
- José Pardavé as Gayosso's patient (uncredited)
- Ignacio Peón as Porter (uncredited)
- Alicia Reyna as Drink seller (uncredited)
- Humberto Rodríguez as Friend of don Pepe (uncredited)
- Aurora Ruiz as Doña Catita (uncredited)
- Ramón Sánchez as Prisoner (uncredited)
- Hernán Vera as Don Tacho (uncredited)

== Bibliography ==
- Dann Luna, Ilana. Adapting Gender: Mexican Feminisms from Literature to Film. SUNY Press, 2018.
