= Juan García (Mexican actor) =

Mexican actor and screenwriter

- Born: Juan García Garza; 5 February 1905; Matamoros, Tamaulipas, Mexico
- Died: 11 October 1973 (aged 68); Mexico City, Mexico
- Occupations: Actor and screenwriter

Juan García Garza (5 February 1905 – 12 October 1973), nicknamed "El Peralvillo", was a Mexican actor and screenwriter. He wrote the screenplays of the films of comedian Germán Valdés, beginning in Tender Pumpkins (1949), and was credited for the street talk featured in Valdés's films.

== Selected filmography ==
- Juan Pistolas (1936)
- El baúl macabro (1936) - Agente Gavilando
- Allá en el Rancho Grande (1936) - Gabino (uncredited)
- El impostor (1937)
- Canción del alma (1938) - Julían - bandido
- La Adelita (1938) - Eusebio Vargas
- Padre de más de cuatro (1938) - Apostadore
- La bestia negra (1939) - El Malcriado
- El charro Negro (1940) - Esbirro de Emilio
- Con su amable permiso (1940) - El deslenguado
- El Zorro de Jalisco (1941) - Esbirro de Ernesto (uncredited)
- The Unknown Policeman (1941) - Chusma (uncredited)
- ¡Ay Jalisco... no te rajes! (1943) - (uncredited)
- The Circus (1943) - Acróbata (uncredited)
- El misterioso señor Marquina (1943) - Villano (uncredited)
- Romeo and Juliet (1943)
- Espionaje en el golfo (1943)
- El corsario negro (1944) - Iván, corsario (uncredited)
- Me ha besado un hombre (1944) - Hombre celoso en cabaret
- El mexicano (1944)
- The Abandoned (1945) - Cliente de Margarita (uncredited)
- Canaima (1945) - Esbirro de Cupira (uncredited)
- A Day with the Devil (1945)
- Amor de una vida (1946) - Campesino (uncredited)
- El ahijado de la muerte (1946) - El coyote
- Enamorada (1946) - Capt. Quiñones
- The Pearl (1947) - Aid 2
- Corridor of Mirrors (1947) - Compadre gordo
- Río Escondido (1948) - Esbirro de Regino
- The Pearl (1948)
- ¡Ay, Palillo, no te rajes! (1948) - (uncredited)
- El casado casa quiere (1948) - Luis Conejo
- Cara sucia (1949)
- Medianoche (1949) - El norteño
- Carta Brava (1949) - El Gorila
- Rough But Respectable (1949) - Sanforizado
- No me defiendas compadre (1949) - Sr. García
- Novia a la medida (1949) - Tambor
- Tender Pumpkins (1949)
- Ventarrón (1949) - Esbirro de Ventarrón (uncredited)
- The King of the Neighborhood (1950) - El Peralvillo
- The Mark of the Skunk (1950) - Pitaya
- Sinbad the Seasick (1950) - Juan el policía
- El ciclón del Caribe (1950)
- La ciudad perdida (1950)
- Mi querido capitán (1950) - Octaviano
- The Honesty of the Lock (1950)
- Oh Darling! Look What You've Done! (1951) - Peralvillo
- Los tres alegres compadres (1952) - (uncredited)
- The Night Falls (1952) - Esbirro de Marcial
- Chucho the Mended (1952) - Detective
- Las tres alegres comadres (1952) - El norteño
- The Beautiful Dreamer (1952) - Cavernario bruto
- Snow White (1952)
- You've Got Me By the Wing (1953) - Jefe de redacción
- Here Come the Freeloaders (1953) - don Octaviano
- The Island of Women (1953) - Isleño (uncredited)
- Plunder of the Sun (1953) - Bartender (uncredited)
- God Created Them (1953) - Asistente de licenciado
- Blowing Wild (1953) - El Gavilan
- The Unknown Mariachi (1953)
- Contigo a la distancia (1954)
- Sindicato de telemirones (1954) - (uncredited)
- Vera Cruz (1954) - Pedro
- Bluebeard (1955) - Director de periódico
- Qué lindo Cha Cha Cha (1955)
- The Tall Men (1955) - Luis
- Look What Happened to Samson (1955)
- Run for the Sun (1956) - Fernandez
- Barefoot Sultan (1956)
- The Bravados (1958) - Pepe Martínez Deputy Sheriff Guarding the Pass (uncredited)
- Ten Days to Tulara (1958) - Piranha
- Besos de arena (1959)
- El ciclón (1959) - Octaviano García
- El tesoro de Chucho el Roto (1960) - Octaviano
- Vuelta al paraíso (1960) - Filemón
- Vivo o muerto (1960) - Octaviano Garcia Garza
- Los valientes no mueren (1962)
- Sartana Does Not Forgive (1968)
- The Undefeated (1969) - Col. Gomez
- Misión cumplida (1970) - Policía (uncredited)
- Something Big (1971) - Juan Garcia
- El metiche (1972)
- Los temibles (1977) - (final film role)

== Bibliography ==
- Monsiváis, Carlos (1997). Mexican Postcards. Verso.
- Hershfield, Joanne; Maciel, David R. (1999). Mexico's Cinema: A Century of Film and Filmmakers. Rowman & Littlefield Publishers.
- García Riera, Emilio (1986). Historia del cine mexicano. Secretaría de Educación Pública.
