= God Created Them =

- Directed by: Gilberto Martínez Solares
- Written by: Gilberto Martínez Solares; Paulino Masip; Alejandro Verbitzky
- Produced by: Fernando de Fuentes hijo Rafael Valdés Castillo; Germán Valdés
- Starring: Germán Valdés; Niní Marshall; Celia Viveros
- Cinematography: Rosalío Solano
- Edited by: José W. Bustos
- Music by: Gustavo César Carrión
- Production company: Producciones Cinematográficas Valdés
- Release date: 15 September 1953
- Running time: 90 minutes
- Country: Mexico
- Language: Spanish

God Created Them (Spanish: Dios los cría) is a 1953 Mexican comedy film written and directed by Gilberto Martínez Solares, and starring Germán Valdés "Tin-Tan", Niní Marshall and Celia Viveros.

== Cast ==
- Germán Valdés as Tin Tan
- Niní Marshall as Nínive Canovas Canesi
- Marcelo Chávez as Licenciado Trinquete
- José René Ruiz as Tun Tun
- Celia Viveros as Lupe
- Juan García as Asistente de licenciado
- Ramón Valdés as Ramón; Otto
- Rafael Estrada as Representante de agencia
- Elvira Lodi as Invitada a fiesta
- Armando Acosta as Transeúnte estación tren
- Daniel Arroyo as Miembro comité asilo
- Victorio Blanco as Espectador asamblea
- Carlos Bravo y Fernández as Representante agencia
- Jorge Chesterking as Hombre con trofeo
- Ismael Larumbe as Empleado hotel
- Gloria Mestre
- Kika Meyer as Clienta salón de belleza
- José Ortega as Chofer de Otto
- José Ortiz de Zárate as Carlos Fernández Taboada
- Yolanda Ortiz as Empleada salón de belleza
- Carlos Robles Gil as Invitado a fiesta
- María Valdealde as Doña Carolina Montero de Campaña
- Hernán Vera as Anunciador en asamblea

== Bibliography ==
- María Luisa Amador. Cartelera cinematográfica, 1950-1959. UNAM, 1985.
