= The Phantom of the Operetta (1960 film) =

1950 Mexican film by Fernando Cortés

- Directed by: Fernando Cortés
- Written by: Juan García; Gilberto Martínez Solares; Alfredo Ruanova
- Produced by: Óscar J. Brooks; Ernesto Enríquez
- Starring: Germán Valdés "Tin-Tan"; Ana Luisa Peluffo; Luis Aldás
- Cinematography: Jack Draper
- Edited by: Gloria Schoemann
- Music by: Manuel Esperón
- Production company: Producciones Brooks
- Release date: 22 December 1960
- Running time: 90 minutes
- Country: Mexico
- Language: Spanish

The Phantom of the Operetta (Spanish: El Fantasma de la opereta) is a 1960 Mexican comedy film written by Juan García and Gilberto Martínez Solares, directed by Fernando Cortés and starring Germán Valdés "Tin-Tan", Ana Luisa Peluffo and Luis Aldás. The plot is a comedic version inspired by The Phantom of the Opera.

== Story ==
A man and his girlfriend take over a run-down theatre, planning to stage musical shows there. However the place soon turns out to be haunted.

== Cast ==
- Germán Valdés "Tin-Tan" as Aldo / Baldomiro Valdes
- Ana Luisa Peluffo as Lucy
- Luis Aldás as Señor Marcucci
- Marcelo Chávez as Señor Lopez
- Fannie Kauffman "Vitola" as Gertrudis "La Flaca"
- Antonio Brillas as Juan
- Julián de Meriche as Vladimir
- Armando Sáenz as De Ramos, theater critic
- Eduardo Alcaraz as Don Quique
- Francisco Reiguera as Jeremias
- José Pardavé as Police officer
- Manuel "El Loco" Valdés
- Jorge Zamora
- Ramón Valdés as Police officer
- Guillermo Hernández as Police officer
- Manuel Alcón

== Bibliography ==
- Joanne Hershfield & David R. Maciel. Mexico's Cinema: A Century of Film and Filmmakers. Rowman & Littlefield, 1999.
