= También de dolor se canta =

1950 Mexican film by René Cardona

- Directed by: René Cardona
- Written by: René Cardona; Álvaro Custodio; Pedro de Urdimalas
- Produced by: Óscar J. Brooks
- Starring: Pedro Infante; Guillermina Green; Oscar Pulido; Irma Dorantes
- Cinematography: Víctor Herrera
- Edited by: José W. Bustos
- Music by: Luis Hernández Bretón
- Production companies: Producciones Mier, Brooks
- Distributed by: Mier, Brooks-Dyana
- Release date: 31 August 1950
- Running time: 97 minutes
- Country: Mexico
- Language: Spanish

También de dolor se canta (One also sings from pain) is a 1950 Mexican comedy film film directed by René Cardona. It stars Pedro Infante, Irma Dorantes and Guillermina Grin. It also features a number of cameo roles from Mexican actors famous at the time, including Germán Valdés "Tin-Tan", Fannie Kauffman "Vitola" and Pedro Vargas amongst others. The film is a parody of the film industry at the time, showing it's inner workings of cinema, but not always its nicer side.

== Plot ==
The movie starts with Braulio Peláez (Pedro Infante), a schoolteacher, having just fallen off his horse, representing the situation he and his family are in. The next scenes introduce the viewer to his family and their poor financial and social situation. As Braulio stumbles around looking for his glasses, he causes a famous film star, Alfonso de Madrazo (Rafael Alcayde) to crash his car. Braulio offers him to eat at his house as an apology. Braulio's sister and mother, big film fans, immediately recognise Alfonso and attempt to get him to bring the girl, Luisa Peláez (Irma Dorantes) to Mexico City to become a film star. Alfonso agrees and tells them to come to the capital.

Braulio and his sister duly come to the capital and go to a dinner reception which Alfonso is also attending. Luisa goes to talk to Alfonso but he pretends not to recognise them and calls them liars. As Luisa tells Braulio this, there is a competition held to see who can sing the best, with the winner winning a kiss from Elisa Miranda (Guillermina Grin), a famous actress who just finished a song. Braulio gets up to give out to Alfonso and is inadvertently picked to sing. It turns out he has a great singing voice and Elisa takes a shine to him immediately. After the song, he goes to Alfonso and gets in a fight, knocking down several men. Seeing this, Elisa states that he is the perfect man for her next movie. Braulio is invited to dine with her and the director and they agree to meet the following day.

At the meeting, they convince an initially reluctant Braulio to take the part, but only after he insists that they pretend the part is actually going to his sister, who the executives don't want to hire because of her awful singing voice. The next day, Braulio turns up to do his job and is introduced the film business for the first time. As he wanders through the studio looking for where they're filming, he meets several famous Mexican actors, including Tin Tan, Leticia Palma and Antonio Badú, who he punches thinking he was assaulting a woman, when it was actually just a film. Then, as he goes to record the songs for the movie, he accidentally insults, then does a duet with Pedro Vargas.

As filming continues, though, it is clear that Braulio does not have what it takes to be a big star, as a result, the producer asks Braulio how much he wants to be released from his contract. Braulio says he wants nothing and, despite the pleas of Elisa, decides to go back to his town and his job as a schoolteacher. While on the train home, he and his sister discover that a lottery ticket he bought earlier was a winner and he can now afford to buy equipment for his father who is a dentist, so that he can get more patients. Braulio and his sister are welcomed back as heroes to the town. When he gets back to his school, he sees a picture drawn on the blackboard, when he asks who it was, a hand raises. He moves closer and discovers the hand in that of Elisa, the two embrace as the movie ends.

== Cast ==
- Pedro Infante as Braulio Peláez
- Guillermina Grin as Elisa Miranda
- Óscar Pulido as Facundo Peláez
- Irma Dorantes as Luisa
- Rafael Alcayde as Alfonso del Madrazo
- Fannie Kaufman as Daniela (as Vitola)
- Florencio Castelló as Señor Isaac
- Alejandro Ciangherotti as Director Borcellini
- Armando Velasco as Adaptador
- Alfredo Varela Jr. as Novio de Luisa
- Germán Valdés as Tin Tan
- Antonio Badú as Antonio Badú
- Leticia Palma as Leticia Palma
- Miguel Morayta as Director de pelicula
- Luis Hernández Bretón as (as Luis H. Bretón)
- Pedro Vargas as Cantante

== Production ==
The film was produced by Óscar J. Brooks, for the company Mier y Brooks. It's the only film where Pedro Infante and Pedro Vargas sing together, and the only one where close friends Infante and Valdés appear together.

== See also ==
- Golden Age of Mexican cinema
- Mexican cinema
