= Kill Me Because I'm Dying! =

- Directed by: Ismael Rodríguez
- Written by: Enrique Jardiel Poncela (novel); Ismael Rodríguez; Pedro de Urdimalas
- Produced by: Luis Leal Solares; Ismael Rodríguez
- Starring: Germán Valdés "Tin-Tan"; Yolanda Montes "Tongolele"
- Cinematography: Jack Draper
- Edited by: Rafael Portillo
- Music by: Raúl Lavista
- Production company: Producciones Rodríguez Hermanos
- Release date: 21 December 1951
- Running time: 99 minutes
- Country: Mexico
- Language: Spanish

Kill Me Because I'm Dying! (Spanish: ¡¡¡Mátenme porque me muero!!!) is a 1951 Mexican comedy film written and directed by Ismael Rodríguez, and starring Germán Valdés "Tin-Tan" and Yolanda Montes "Tongolele". This is the only Tin-Tan film in which Tongolele had a prominent role, as her appearances in The King of the Neighborhood (1950) and Chucho the Mended (1952) were only cameos.

== Cast ==
- Germán Valdés as Tin-Tan
- Óscar Pulido as Doctor
- Yolanda Montes as Santanela
- Marcelo Chávez como Marcelo
- José René Ruiz
- Emma Rodríguez
- Tito Novaro
- Joaquín García "Borolas"
- Miguel Manzano
- Pompín Iglesias
- Ildefonso Sánchez Curiel
- Pedro de Urdimalas
- Nicolás Rodríguez
- Jesús Graña
- Jorge Treviño
- Guillermo Calles
- Abel Cureño
- El Gigantón
- Los Sherife
- José Ángel Espinosa "Ferrusquilla" as Narrator
- Victorio Blanco
- Guillermo Bravo Sosa
- Leonor Gómez as Cliente en bar
- Héctor Mateos
- José Muñoz
- José Pardavé
- Juan Pulido
- Francisco Reiguera
- Ismael Rodríguez as Transeúnte
- Ramón Valdés
- Armando Velasco

== Bibliography ==
- Rogelio Agrasánchez. Cine Mexicano: Posters from the Golden Age, 1936-1956. Chronicle Books, 2001.
