= Las locuras de Tin-Tan =

- Directed by: Gilberto Martínez Solares
- Written by: Carlos León (story), Gilberto Martínez Solares
- Produced by: Fernando de Fuentes
- Starring: Germán Valdés; Carmelita González; Evangelina Elizondo
- Cinematography: Jorge Stahl Jr.
- Edited by: José W. Bustos
- Music by: Gonzalo Curiel
- Release date: 9 January 1952
- Running time: 87 minutes
- Country: Mexico
- Language: Spanish

Las locuras de Tin-Tan ("The Follies of Tin-Tan") is a 1952 Mexican film written and directed by Gilberto Martínez Solares, and starring Germán Valdés "Tin-Tan", Carmelita González and Evangelina Elizondo. This film marked the film debut of the actress and singer Evangelina Elizondo, and the french actress Eliane Bancet.

== Cast ==
- Germán Valdés - Tin-Tan
- Carmelita González - Lolita
- Marcelo Chávez - Marcelo
- Evangelina Elizondo - Paloma
- Tito Novaro -
- Wolf Ruvinskis -
- Eva Calvo - Marta
- Joaquín García Vargas - Napoleon
- Florencio Castelló - Don Manuel
- Armando Sáenz - Roberto
- Francisco Reiguera - Doctor Lucas de Mente
- Nicolás Rodríguez - Don Calixto
- Quinteto Allegro
