= Champion Without a Crown =

- Directed by: Alejandro Galindo
- Written by: Gabriel Ramírez Osante; Alejandro Galindo; Raúl de Anda
- Produced by: Raúl de Anda
- Starring: David Silva; Amanda del Llano; Carlos López Moctezuma
- Cinematography: Domingo Carrillo
- Edited by: Carlos Savage
- Music by: Rosalío Ramírez
- Production company: Producciones Raúl de Anda
- Release date: 5 September 1946
- Running time: 111 minutes
- Country: Mexico
- Language: Spanish

Champion Without a Crown (Spanish: Campeón sin corona) is a 1946 Mexican sports film directed as well as co-written by Alejandro Galindo and starring David Silva, Amanda del Llano and Carlos López Moctezuma. It is set in the world of boxing.

== Plot ==
Roberto "El Kid" Terranova (David Silva), a snow cone vendor in La Lagunilla, incites a brawl during a boxing match in which he is participating. After escaping the ensuing chaos, he returns home, where his mother urges him to avoid trouble and lead a more peaceful life. Promising to stay out of fights, Roberto resumes his quiet routine alongside his close friend "El Chupa" (Fernando Soto "Mantequilla") and his girlfriend Lupita (Amanda del Llano).

However, when he intervenes in a street altercation to defend a mistreated boy, Roberto catches the attention of boxing manager Uncle Rosas (Carlos López Moctezuma), who sees potential in him and offers to train him as a professional fighter. Under Rosas’s guidance, Roberto defeats Zubieta, the world's fifth-ranked lightweight boxer, whom he had previously encountered at a fair.

In a subsequent match against Ronda, an English-speaking opponent, Roberto becomes distracted upon noticing his rival’s American girlfriend during the fight and is knocked out. Discouraged, he considers retiring, but Lupita persuades him to continue. After knocking out a Filipino opponent, Roberto gains the attention of Susana, a wealthy socialite who seduces him. Rosas organizes a tour in the United States, which Roberto reluctantly accepts, while Susana, losing interest, departs for Acapulco.

Upon his victorious return to Mexico, Roberto is rejected by Susana. He causes a scene at her home, which results in his arrest. Rosas, for undisclosed reasons, arranges to keep him in jail.

== Cast ==
- David Silva as Roberto Kid Terranova
- Amanda del Llano as Lupita
- Carlos López Moctezuma as Sr. Rosas
- Fernando Soto "Mantequilla" as El chupa
- Nelly Montiel as Susana
- Víctor Parra as Joe Ronda
- María Gentil Arcos as Doña Gracia, Madre de Roberto
- Pepe del Río as Juan Zubieta
- Félix Medel as Don Roque
- Aurora Cortés as Anastacia
- José Pardavé as Amigo de Roberto
- Salvador Quiroz as Presidente de la comisión de boxeo
- Alberto Catalá as Second
- Bucky Gutierrez as Pilar, sirvienta
- Roberto Cañedo as Ordoñez
- Antonio Padilla 'Pícoro' as Presentador de peleas
- Carlos Aguirre as Amigo de Susana
- Stephen Berne as Hombre calvo entrenando gimnasio
- Clifford Carr as Mr. Carr, representante de Ronda
- Fernando Curielas Jorge
- Ramiro Gamboa «Tio Gamboin» as Locutor
- Leonor Gómez as Cocinera
- Alfonso Jiménez as Policía
- Ramón G. Larrea as Amigo de Susana
- Pedro Mago Septien as Locutor
- Héctor Mateos as Vendedor
- Ignacio Peón as Mesonero
- Estanislao Shilinsky as Mora
- Hernán Vera as Cantinero

== Bibliography ==
- Segre, Erica. Intersected Identities: Strategies of Visualisation in Nineteenth- and Twentieth-century Mexican Culture. Berghahn Books, 2007.
