= The Viscount of Monte Cristo =

1954 film

- Directed by: Gilberto Martínez Solares
- Written by: Juan Garcia; Gilberto Martínez Solares
- Produced by: Óscar J. Brooks; Ernesto Enríquez; Felipe Mier
- Starring: Germán Valdés "Tin-Tan"; Ana Bertha Lepe; Fannie Kauffman "Vitola"
- Cinematography: José Ortiz Ramos
- Edited by: Carlos Savage
- Music by: Manuel Esperón
- Production companies: Mier y Brooks; Producciones Cinematográficas Valdés
- Release date: 7 October 1954
- Running time: 90 minutes
- Country: Mexico
- Language: Spanish

The Viscount of Monte Cristo (Spanish: El Vizconde de Montecristo) is a 1954 Mexican comedy film directed by Gilberto Martínez Solares and starring Germán Valdés "Tin-Tan", Ana Bertha Lepe and Fannie Kauffman "Vitola". The film draws some of its plot from Alexandre Dumas's The Count of Monte Cristo with the setting moved to contemporary Mexico. Valdés' films of the era were often distorted, comic versions of classic literature.

== Cast ==
- Germán Valdés "Tin-Tan" as Inocencio Dantés / El Vizconde de Montecristo
- Ana Bertha Lepe as Marga
- Andrés Soler as Don Facundo Farías
- Miguel Arenas as Don Miguel
- Rafael Bertrand as Polito
- Fannie Kauffman "Vitola" as Rosaura
- Marcelo Chávez as Policia celador
- Joaquín García "Borolas" as Lino
- Armando Acosta as Invitado fiesta romana
- Armando Arriola as Fotógrafo
- León Barroso as Músico
- Guillermo Bravo Sosa as Chofer carro fúnebre
- Silvia Carrillo as Bailarina
- Julio Daneri as Hombre provoca panico
- Amalia Gama as Clienta anciana en banco
- Héctor Godoy as Pianista
- Leonor Gómez as Mujer en cantina
- Guillermo Hernández as Prisionero
- Vicente Lara as Hombre en cantina
- Lupe Legorreta as Lupita, secretaria
- Carlos León as Guardia en fiesta romana
- Salvador Lozano as Detective policía
- José Ortega as El sapo, prisionero
- José Pardavé as Chofer carro fúnebre
- Ignacio Peón as Cliente banco
- Humberto Rodríguez as Cliente banco
- Manuel Sánchez Navarro as Cajero de banco
- Rafael Torres as Preso
- Manuel 'Loco' Valdés as Hombre en cantina
- Hernán Vera as Cantinero

== Bibliography ==
- Joanne Hershfield & David R. Maciel. Mexico's Cinema: A Century of Film and Filmmakers. Rowman & Littlefield, 1999.
