= Trip to the Moon (1958 film) =

1958 Mexican film by Fernando Cortés

- Directed by: Fernando Cortés
- Written by: Fernando Cortés; Fernando Galiana; Carlos Sampelayo
- Produced by: Óscar J. Brooks; Ernesto Enríquez
- Starring: Kitty de Hoyos; Sergio Corona; Alfonso Arau; Germán Valdés "Tin-Tan"; Marco Antonio Campos "Viruta"; Gaspar Henaine "Capulina"; Manuel "El Loco" Valdés; Fannie Kauffman "Vitola"; Leopoldo "Polo" Ortin, Joaquín García "Borolas"; Ramiro Gamboa "Tío Gamboin"; Xavier López "Chabelo"; Celia Viveros; Cuca Escobar
- Cinematography: José Ortiz Ramos
- Edited by: Rafael Ceballos
- Music by: Manuel Esperón
- Production company: Brooks y Enríquez
- Release date: 2 April 1958 (Mexico)
- Running time: 80 minutes
- Country: Mexico
- Language: Spanish

Trip to the Moon (Spanish: Viaje a la luna) is a 1958 Mexican comedy film written and directed by Fernando Cortés, and starring Kitty de Hoyos and an ensemble cast of comedians such as Sergio Corona, Alfonso Arau, Germán Valdés "Tin-Tan", Marco Antonio Campos "Viruta", Gaspar Henaine "Capulina", Manuel "El Loco" Valdés, Fannie Kauffman "Vitola", Leopoldo "Polo" Ortin, Joaquín García "Borolas", Ramiro Gamboa "Tio Gamboin", Xavier López "Chabelo", Celia Viveros and Cuca Escobar. It has multiple references to the classic film Le Voyage dans la Lune (1902) by Georges Méliès.

== Cast ==
- Kitty de Hoyos as Kitty
- Sergio Corona as Manuel Cernadas
- Alfonso Arau as Carlos Vera
- Germán Valdés "Tin-Tan" as Dr. Nicolás Pérez
- Marco Antonio Campos "Viruta" as Fireman
- Gaspar Henaine "Capulina" as Fireman
- Manuel "El Loco" Valdés as Georges Danton
- Fannie Kauffman "Vitola" as Anastasia
- Leopoldo "Polo" Ortin as Paco
- Joaquín García "Borolas" as Detective
- Ramiro Gamboa "Tio Gamboin" as Al Capone
- Xavier López "Chabelo" as Babyface
- Celia Viveros

== Plot ==
The film combines humor, absurdity, and surrealism, exploring themes of escapism, mental illness, and the power of the mind.

Two men hiding out because of publicity stunt about one of them playing a masked singing hawker of bad-tasting cigarettes check into "El Seminario Mental" (The Mind Seminar), a mental sanitarium. They are mistaken as mentally ill individuals by the director (Kitty de Hoyos) who is the owner of the property but is also a self-checked-in patient. In a short time, the two men (or aristocrats as the patients call them) realize that the patients are running the asylum.

The patients are all trapped in their own delusions and historical characters (Napoleon and Josephine, Inspector Hercule Poirot, Cleopatra, Salome, Herod, Mark Antony, a French revolutionary, firemen, a psychiatrist, a ballet dancer, Goya, Othello, et al.) which include elaborate musical numbers. It seems that the effects of the full moon has brought on an extreme case of lunacy among the patients. Try as they may, the two man cannot escape and one falls in love with the female director.

As the movie reaches the climax, each patient begins to celebrate Christmas when the executive director breaks into a Russian song. One topic leads to another with a patient who thinks she is Anastasia when the topic of the Russian space satellite, Sputnik is mentioned. This leads to a song about Sputnik and an elaborate fantasy by all of space exploration. Meanwhile, the publicity stunt about a masked singer hawking cigarettes continues with a twist.
