= Loco por ellas =

1966 Mexican-Venezuelan film

- Film poster
- Directed by: Manuel de la Pedrosa
- Starring: Germán Valdés; Lorena Velázquez
- Release date: 1965
- Countries: Mexico; Venezuela
- Language: Spanish

Loco por ellas is a Mexican-Venezuelan musical comedy and romance film co-produced in 1965 and released on 5 August 1966, written and directed by Manuel de la Pedrosa, and starring Germán Valdés "Tin-Tan" and Lorena Velázquez. This film features of which there is a special participation of some Venezuelan actors, among them the singer and actor Néstor Zavarce.

== Production ==
This film was shot on location in San Juan, Puerto Rico and Caracas, Venezuela. This is the second time Tin-Tan plays a double role.

== Plot ==
Tin Tan plays a double role as twin brothers: One is a womanizer and a famous singer. The other is a lost man who still lives in the family home. When the singer falls ill, he sends the twin in his place, but in reality he wants to commit a million-dollar robbery.

== Cast ==
- Germán Valdés "Tin-Tan" as Ángel Macías/Alberto Macías/Padre de Ángel y Alberto.
- Lorena Velázquez as Elena Rosas.
- Marcelo Chávez as Marcelo.
- Néstor Zavarce
- Evelyn Suffront
- Chichi Caldera
- Josefina Briseño
- Alfonso Jiménez
- Hugo Montes
