= Kill Yourself, My Love =

- Directed by: Gilberto Martínez Solares
- Written by: Luis Alcoriza
- Starring: Germán Valdés "Tin-Tan", Teresa Velázquez, Marina Camacho
- Release date: 1961
- Running time: 90 minute
- Country: Mexico
- Language: Spanish

Kill Yourself, My Love (Spanish: ¡Suicídate, mi amor!) is a 1961 Mexican comedy film produced by Antonio Matouk, written by Luis Alcoriza, directed by Gilberto Martínez Solares and starring Germán Valdés "Tin-Tan", Teresa Velázquez and Marina Camacho.
