= Bluebeard (1955 film) =

- Directed by: Gilberto Martínez Solares
- Written by: Juan García; Ulises Petit de Murat; Óscar J. Brooks; Gilberto Martínez Solares
- Produced by: Óscar J. Brooks; Felipe Mier; Ernesto Enríquez
- Starring: Germán Valdés "Tin-Tan"; Amanda del Llano; Verónica Loyo; Lola Beltrán; Joan Page; Fannie Kauffman "Vitola"; Rosalía Julián
- Cinematography: Domingo Carrillo
- Edited by: Carlos Savage
- Music by: Manuel Esperón
- Production companies: Mier y Brooks; Producciones Cinematográficas Valdés
- Distributed by: Distribuidora Independiente
- Release date: 28 January 1955
- Running time: 100 minutes
- Country: Mexico
- Language: Spanish

Bluebeard (Spanish:Los líos de Barba Azul) is a 1955 Mexican comedy film written and directed by Gilberto Martínez Solares, and starring Germán Valdés "Tin-Tan", Amanda del Llano, Verónica Loyo, Lola Beltrán, Joan Page, Fannie Kauffman "Vitola" and Rosalía Julián.

== Cast ==
- Germán Valdés "Tin-Tan" as Ricardo
- Amanda del Llano as Olga
- Verónica Loyo as Aurora
- Lola Beltrán as doña Lola Bárbara Beltrán
- Joan Page as Gringa
- Fannie Kauffman "Vitola" as Emeteria
- Marcelo Chávez as Marcelo
- Rafael Alcayde as don Agustín
- Rosalía Julián as María, sirvienta de Aurora
- Ramiro Gamboa as Nacho
- Juan García as Director de periódico
- Gregorio Acosta as Rosendo, chofer
- Daniel Arroyo as Catedrático
- Guillermo Bravo Sosa as Mayordomo
- Pedro Elviro as Empleado de don Agustín
- Emilio Garibay as Hombre en cantina
- Elvira Lodi as Secretaria
- José Muñoz as empleado doña Bárbara
- José Ortega as Hombre en cantina
- Carlos Robles Gil as Invitado a boda
- Humberto Rodríguez as Boticario
- Nicolás Rodríguez as Hombre con pastillas
- Hernán Vera as Gasolinero

== Bibliography ==
- Carlos Monsiváis & John Kraniauskas. Mexican Postcards. Verso, 1997.
