= Marcelo Chávez =

Marcelo Chávez may refer to:

- Marcelo Chávez (actor) (1911–1970), Mexican actor
- Marcelo Chávez (politician) (born 1975), Chilean politician
