= Snow White (1952 film) =

1952 film

- Directed by: Gilberto Martínez Solares
- Written by: Juan García; Gilberto Martínez Solares
- Produced by: Óscar J. Brooks; Felipe Mier
- Starring: Germán Valdés; Alicia Caro
- Cinematography: Ezequiel Carrasco
- Edited by: Carlos Savage
- Music by: Luis Hernández Bretón
- Production companies: Cinematográfica Valdés; Mier y Brooks
- Release date: 8 February 1952
- Running time: 95 minutes
- Country: Mexico
- Language: Spanish

Snow White or Cinderello (Spanish title: El ceniciento) is a 1952 Mexican comedy film written and directed by Gilberto Martínez Solares, and starring Germán Valdés "Tin-Tan" and Alicia Caro.It was followed by a sequel filmed the same year, Chucho the Mended.

== Cast ==
- Germán Valdés "Tin-Tan" as Valentín Gaytán
- Alicia Caro as Magdalena
- Andrés Soler as Andrés
- Marcelo Chávez as Marcelo
- Tito Novaro as Marcelito
- Magda Donato as Sirenia
- Daniel Arroyo as Invitado a fiesta
- Jaime Fernández as Anunciador
- Francisco Reiguera as Inspector celestial
- Humberto Rodríguez as Jugador de cartas

== Bibliography ==
- Paulo Antonio Paranaguá. Mexican Cinema. British Film Institute, 1995.
- Paul A. Schroeder Rodríguez. Latin American Cinema: A Comparative History. Univ of California Press, 2016.
