= Barefoot Sultan =

- Directed by: Gilberto Martínez Solares
- Written by: Gilberto Martínez Solares; Eduardo Ugarte; Juan García
- Produced by: Fernando de Fuentes hijo Rafael Valdés Castillo; Germán Valdés
- Starring: Germán Valdés; Yolanda Varela; Liliana Durán
- Cinematography: Enrique Wallace
- Edited by: José W. Bustos
- Music by: Gonzalo Curiel
- Production company: Producciones Cinematográficas Valdés
- Release date: 31 March 1956
- Running time: 87 minutes
- Country: Mexico
- Language: Spanish

Barefoot Sultan (Spanish:El sultán descalzo) is a 1956 Mexican comedy film written and directed by Gilberto Martínez Solares, and starring Germán Valdés "Tin-Tan", Yolanda Varela and Liliana Durán. This film features the last appearance of Durán.

== Main cast ==
- Germán Valdés "Tin-Tan" as Sultán Casquillo
- Yolanda Varela as Cristina Mena
- Óscar Pulido as Tomás
- Wolf Ruvinskis as Hilario
- Joaquín García "Borolas" as Don Venustiano
- Liliana Durán as Pancha
- Marcelo Chávez as Comisario
- Elmo Michel as Doctor
- Florencio Castelló as Don Pacorro
- José Jasso "El Ojón" as Productor
- Agata Rosenow as Aidita
- Óscar Ortiz de Pinedo as Maestro de baile
- Silvia Carrillo as Bailarina
- Martinique as Bailarina negra

== Bibliography ==
- Carlos Monsiváis & John Kraniauskas. Mexican Postcards. Verso, 1997.
