= Sergio Corona =

Mexican actor (born 1928)

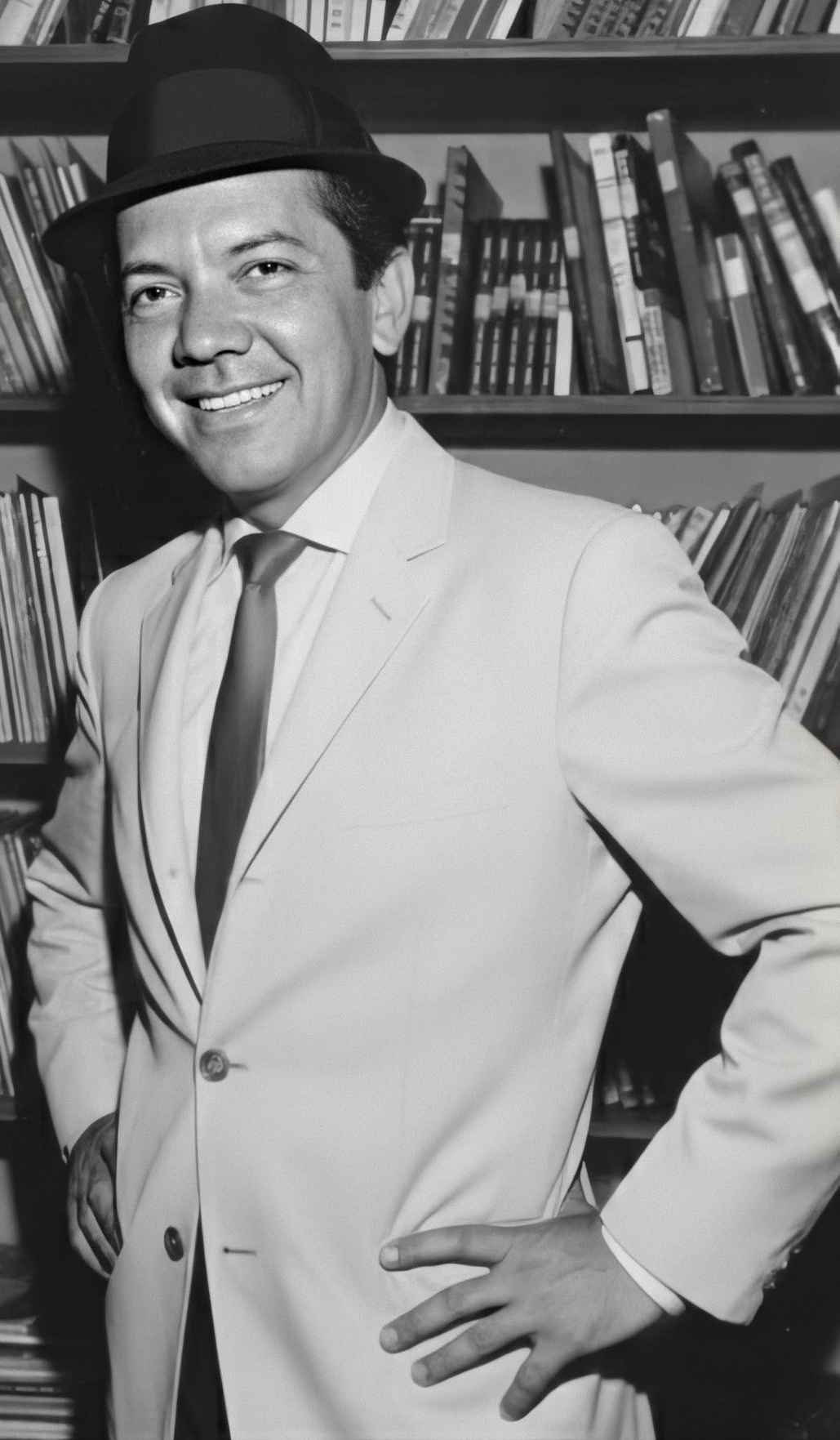
- Corona in 1961
- Born: Sergio Corona Ortega; 7 October 1928 (age 98); Pachuca, Hidalgo, Mexico
- Occupations: Actor; singer; dancer
- Years active: 1950–present
- Spouse: Ingrid Doppler Brandais (m. 1964)
- Children: 3

Sergio Corona Ortega (born 7 October 1928) is a Mexican actor and dancer. His career spans over seven decades.

== Early life ==
Born to Miguel Corona, a district judge and María Cristina Ortega, Corona experienced a challenging childhood, he battled infant illness, delayed schooling, and worked selling shoes while studying ballet with the Silva brothers. In 1950, he performed with Ballet Chapultepec in Havana and later shared stage and cabaret performances with his brother-in-law, Alfonso Arau, until 1958.

== Career ==
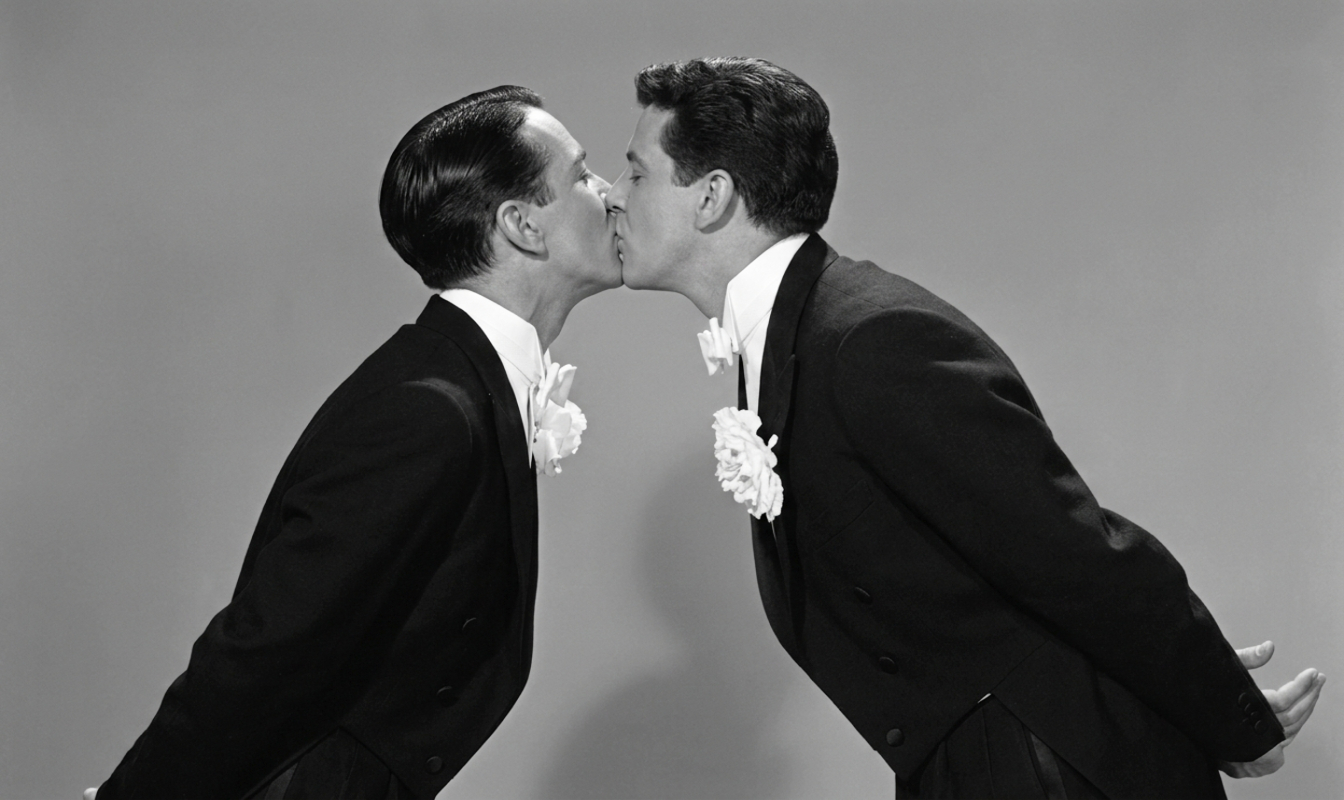
Sergio Corona and Alfonso Arau in Viaje a la Luna (1958)

Corona began appearing in films during Mexico's cinematic Golden Age, working with icons like Pedro Infante, Fernando Soler, and Joaquín Pardavé in productions such as Los Tres Huastecos (1948) and El Grito de la Carne (1951). He produced memorable performances in theatre, including La fiaca and Sugar, and made musical contributions like writing Spanish lyrics for "O pato" and other songs.

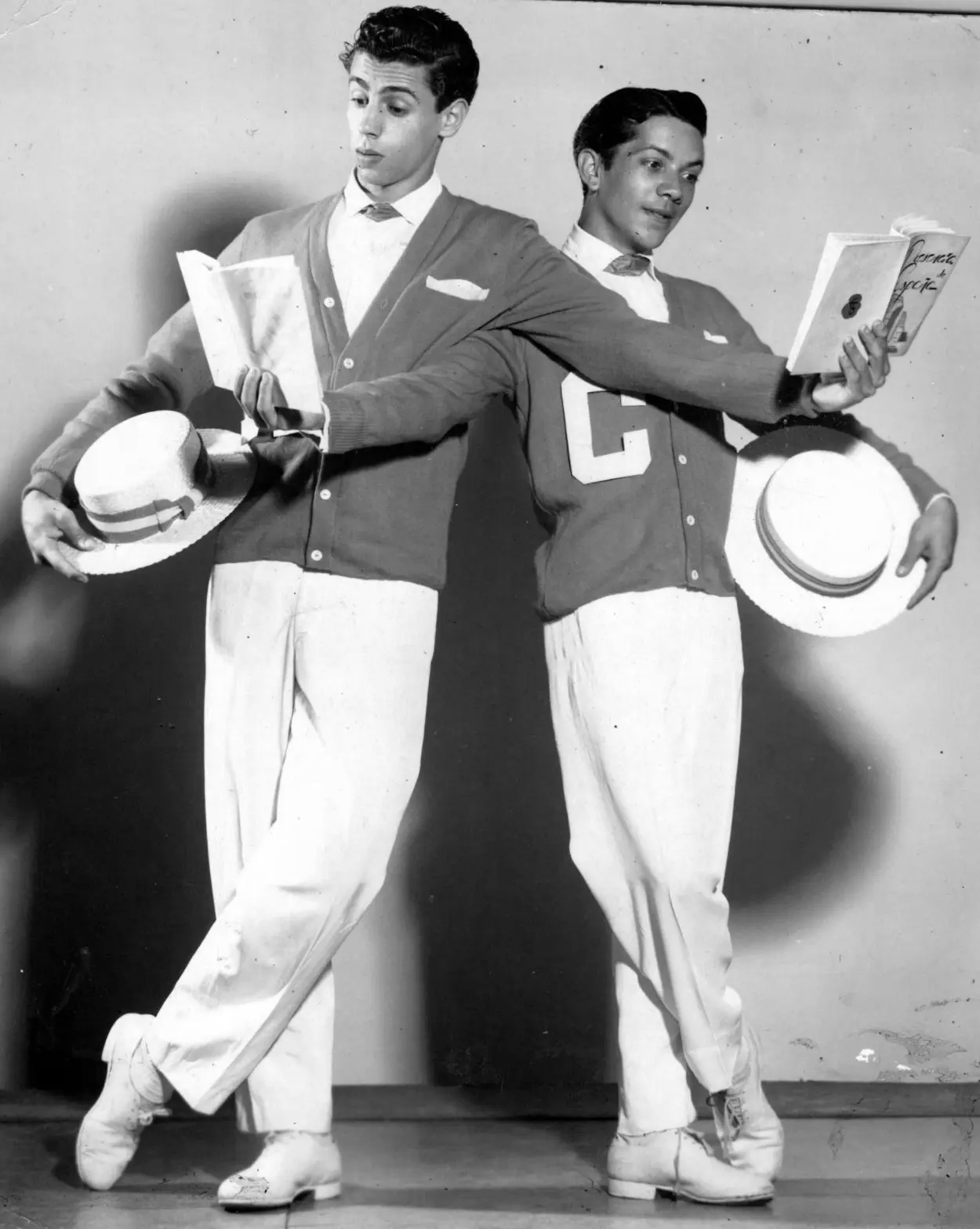
Sergio Corona and Alfonso Arau in the 1950s

His breakthrough role came in the popular sitcom Hogar, dulce hogar (1974–1982), portraying Sergio alongside Luz María Aguilar. He gained nationwide recognition as "Don Julio Regalado" in commercials for Comercial Mexicana. From 2011 until his departure in 2024, he starred as Don Tomás in the series Como dice el dicho.

Corona published his memoir Te invito a mi camerino, recounting life behind the scenes in theatre and television. He also composed for film and authored Spanish-language lyrics for notable songs, including those performed by José José and Chabelo.

Sergio received a tribute at the Mexican Senate in July 2024 honoring his career. At age 96, he continues to be recognized as a multifaceted entertainer, dancer, actor, comedian, singer, and writer, who shaped Mexican popular culture.

== Personal life ==
He has been married since 1964 to Austrian dancer Ingrid Doppler Brandais, and together they have three children.

== Filmography ==
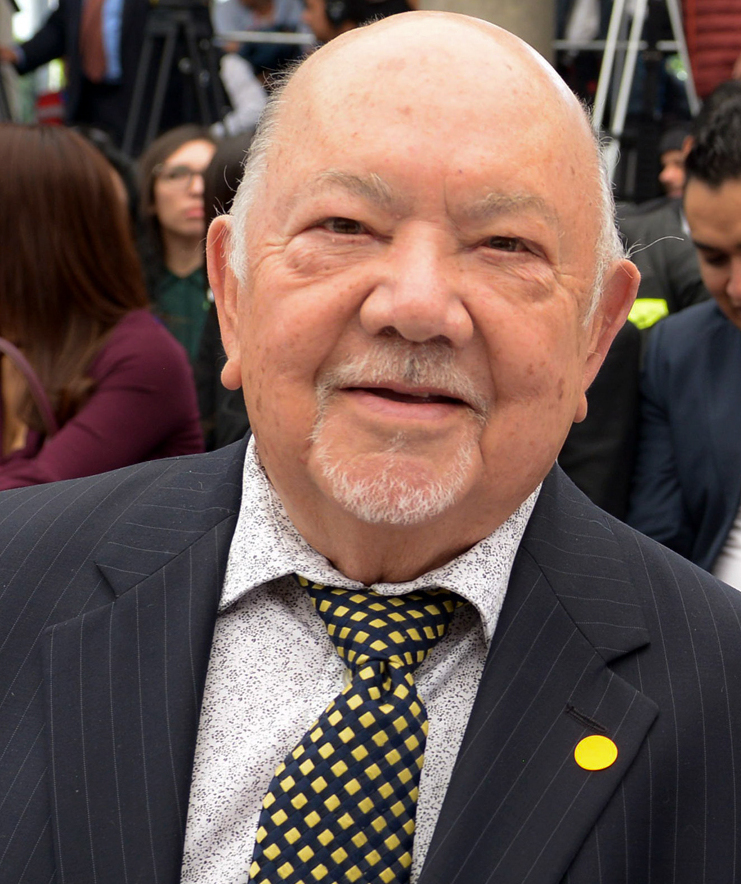
Sergio Corona in 2018

- Los Tres Huastecos (1948)
- El Grito de la Carne (1951)
- Viaje a la luna (1958)
- Los pistolocos (1960)
- Tres tristes tigres (1961)
- Cinco nacos asaltan Las Vegas (1987)
- Licence to Kill (1989) – Bellboy
- Euthanasia Club (2005) – Paco "El Elegante"
- Hogar, dulce hogar (1974–1982)
- La extraña dama (1989)
- Pobre niña rica (1995–1996) – Don Miguel Laureano Múzquiz
- Vivo por Elena (1998) – Don Fermín
- Infierno en el paraíso (1999) – Padre Juan
- Mujer, casos de la vida real (2002–2007)
- La fea más bella (2006) – Lic. Antonio Sanchez
- Plaza Sésamo (2006–2013) – Don Boni
- Propiedad Ajena (2007) – Duque de Bexar en TV
- Alma de hierro (2008) – Bernardo
- Hasta que el dinero nos separe (2009–2010) – Jorge Álvarez del Castillo
- Mujeres asesinas (2010) – Hilario
- Esta historia me suena (2019–2020)
- Como dice el dicho (2011–2024) – Don Tomás León
