= The Beautiful Dreamer =

- Directed by: Gilberto Martínez Solares
- Written by: Juan García; Gilberto Martínez Solares
- Produced by: Óscar J. Brooks; Ernesto Enríquez; Felipe Mier; Germán Valdés
- Starring: Germán Valdés; Lilia del Valle
- Cinematography: Raúl Martínez Solares
- Edited by: Carlos Savage
- Music by: Manuel Esperón
- Production companies: Cinematográfica Valdés; Mier y Brooks
- Release date: 29 August 1952
- Running time: 75 minutes
- Country: Mexico
- Language: Spanish

The Beautiful Dreamer (Spanish: El bello durmiente) is a 1952 Mexican comedy film written and directed by Gilberto Martínez Solares, and starring Germán Valdés "Tin-Tan" and Lilia del Valle.

The film's sets were designed by the art director Edward Fitzgerald.

== Cast ==
- Germán Valdés "Tin-Tan" as Triquitrán
- Lilia del Valle as Jade / Yolanda
- Wolf Ruvinskis as Tracatá / Dr. Heinrich Wolf
- Marcelo Chávez as Tico Tico / Don Marcelo
- Juan García as Cavernario bruto
- Gloria Mestre as Invitada a fiesta
- José René Ruiz as Brujo Chaquira
- Pascual García Peña
- Nicolás Rodríguez as Don Ramón
- Armando Arriola as Don Alfonso
- Lucrecia Muñoz as Cavernaria / excursionista
- Manuel Trejo Morales as Cavernario
- Elena Julián as Cavernaria
- Georgina González as Cavernaria
- Elvira Lodi as Cavernaria en salón de belleza
- Eduardo Bonada
- Joaquín García Vargas as Brujo
- Tonina Jackson
- Fernando Osés
- Guillermo Hernández
- Sergio Llanes
- Jack Parelli
- Raul Romero
- Fuco Jiménez
- Joe Silva
- Rodolfo Calvo as Juez de registro civil
- Jorge Chesterking as Invitado fiesta disfraz
- Fernando Curiel as Reportero
- Leonor Gómez as Cavernaria
- Diana Ochoa as Excursionista
- Ángela Rodríguez as Invitada a boda
- Pepe Ruiz Vélez as Locutor
- María Valdealde as Invitada a fiesta de disfraz
- Ramón Valdés as Cavernario

== Bibliography ==
- Paul A. Schroeder Rodríguez. Latin American Cinema: A Comparative History. Univ of California Press, 2016.
