= Puss Without Boots =

1957 film

- Directed by: Fernando Cortés
- Written by: Fernando Cortés; Fernando Galiana
- Produced by: Óscar J. Brooks; Ernesto Enríquez; Felipe Mier; Germán Valdés
- Starring: Germán Valdés; Martha Valdés
- Cinematography: Jack Draper
- Edited by: Rafael Ceballos
- Music by: Manuel Esperón
- Production companies: Mier y Brooks; Producciones Cinematográficas Valdés
- Release date: 31 July 1957
- Running time: 85 minutes
- Country: Mexico
- Language: Spanish

Puss Without Boots (Spanish: El gato sin botas) is a 1957 Mexican comedy film directed by Fernando Cortés and starring Germán Valdés "Tin-Tan" and Martha Valdés.

== Cast ==
- Germán Valdés "Tin-Tan" as Agustín Tancredo "El Gato" / Don Victorio Tancredo
- Martha Valdés as Laura del Castillo
- Nono Arsu as Paco
- Wolf Ruvinskis as Humberto Carrasco
- Marcelo Chávez as Sargento Botija
- José Pidal as Sansón
- Pepe Ruiz Vélez as Comentarista
- Julián de Meriche as Aladino
- Américo Caggiano as Tamalito
- Antonio Brillas as Señor Comisario
- Carlos Bravo y Fernández as Reportero
- Sara Cabrera as Josefina
- Lupe Carriles as Vecina
- Enrique Carrillo as Policía
- Fernando Cortés as Director pelicula
- Julio Daneri as Reportero
- Javier de la Parra as Actor rechaza empleo
- Gerardo del Castillo as Empleado estudio
- Pedro Elviro as Hombre en estadio
- Pepita González as Dalilah
- Héctor Mateos as Empleado de los estudios
- Rosa María Montes as Enfermera
- Magda Monzón as Secretaria
- José Ortega as Policía
- Carlos Robles Gil as Espectador
- Humberto Rodríguez as Villista
- Miguel Suárez as Comandante

== Bibliography ==
- Carlos Monsiváis & John Kraniauskas. Mexican Postcards. Verso, 1997.
