= Look What Happened to Samson =

1955 film

- Directed by: Gilberto Martínez Solares
- Written by: Gilberto Martínez Solares; Paulino Masip; Alejandro Verbitzky; Juan García
- Produced by: Fernando de Fuentes hijo
- Starring: Germán Valdés; Ana Bertha Lepe; Yolanda Varela; Elvira Quintana
- Cinematography: Enrique Wallace
- Edited by: José W. Bustos
- Music by: Gonzalo Curiel
- Production company: Diana Films
- Release date: 6 October 1955
- Running time: 91 minutes
- Country: Mexico
- Language: Spanish

Look What Happened to Samson (Spanish:Lo que le pasó a Sansón) is a 1955 Mexican comedy film written and directed by Gilberto Martínez Solares, and starring Germán Valdés "Tin-Tan", Ana Bertha Lepe, Yolanda Varela and Elvira Quintana. It is a parody of the biblic story of Samson and Delilah.

== Main cast ==
- Germán Valdés "Tin-Tan" as Tin Tan / Sansón
- Ana Bertha Lepe as Lila / Dalila
- Yolanda Varela as Soledad / Semadar
- Andrés Soler as Tío de Lila / Gran Sarán
- Marcelo Chávez as Arthur / Príncipe Atur
- Eduardo Alcaraz as Padre de Dalila
- Elvira Quintana as Miriam
- Manuel Calvo as Matouk
- María Herrero as Arpagona
- Óscar Ortiz de Pinedo
- Armando Arriola as Don Santiago / Arquitecto Pío Rea
- Elvira Lodi
- Carlos Bravo y Fernández as Guardia

== Bibliography ==
- Carlos Monsiváis & John Kraniauskas. Mexican Postcards. Verso, 1997.
