= Vitola (actress) =

Canadian-Mexican actress and comedian (1924-2009)

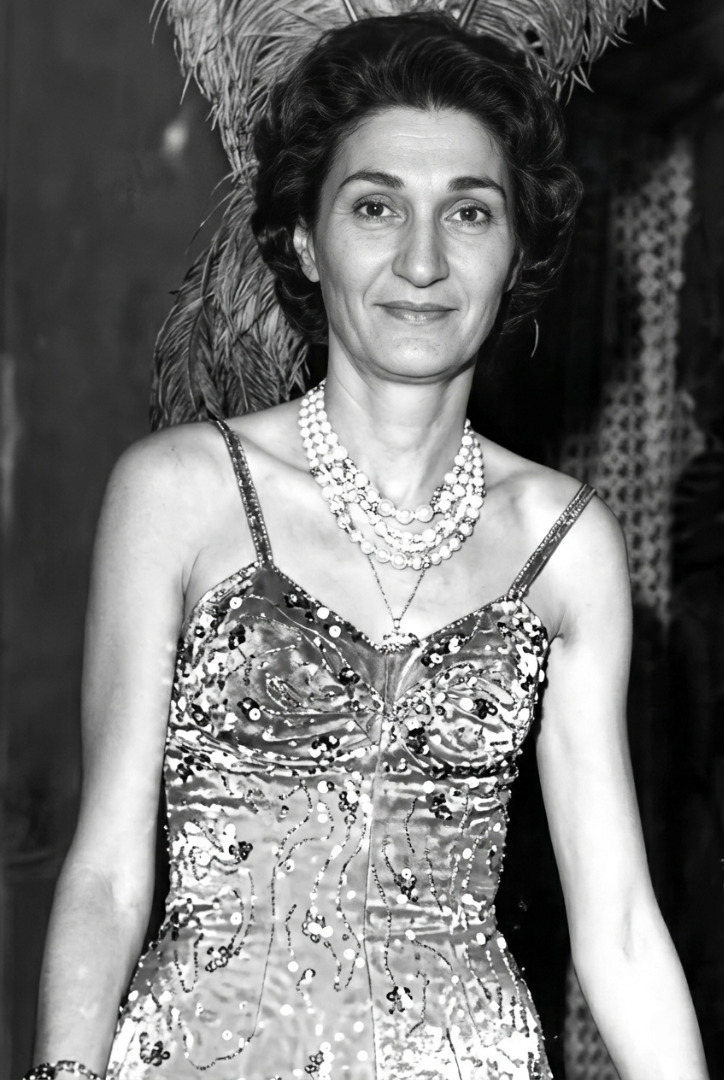
- Vitola in the 1960s
- Born: Fannie Kauffman; April 11, 1924; Toronto, Ontario, Canada
- Died: February 21, 2009 (aged 84); Mexico City, Mexico
- Other names: Vitola; La Vitola; Fanny Kauffman
- Occupations: Actress, comedian
- Years active: 1943–1997 (approx.)
- Children: 5, including Humberto Elizondo

Fannie Kauffman (April 11, 1924 – February 21, 2009), often known by her stage name Vitola, was a Canadian-born Mexican actress and comedian. She mainly known for her work in comedy films in the 1950s and 1960s, frequently appearing alongside Germán Valdés «Tin-Tan».

== Early life ==
Kauffman was born on April 11, 1924, in Toronto, Ontario, Canada, to parents of Romanian-Jewish descent. She moved with her parents to Cuba and was raised in Havana, where she resided until she was 22 years old. She began her entertainment career in Cuba as a child singer at the age of 8, when she thought of becoming an opera singer.

Kauffman's parents entered her in a radio contest when she was eleven and a half years old. The contest was looking for a girl to appear on the daily children's radio show, La Escuelita. Kauffman won the contest and began appearing on the radio with the Cuban comic team, Agapito y Timoteo. Kauffman earned her lifelong nickname, Vitola, while working in Cuban radio. Her nickname is based on the vitola of Cuban cigars.

== Career ==
Kauffman transitioned to comedy and moved to Mexico in 1943, shortly before she turned 23 years old. In 2007, Kauffman told the newspaper El Universal that, although she was raised in Canada and Cuba, she emphasized that, "Soy mexicana" (I am Mexican), after more than 60 years of residing in the country.

She made her Mexican debut at the Teatro Arbeu in Mexico City in 1943. Kauffman met Germán Valdés, who was better known as Tin-Tan, while working at the Teatro Arbeu. Kauffman and Tin-Tan developed a close professional relationship which spanned both of their careers. The two often appearing opposite one another on screen and stage.

In 1946, Kauffman launched her film career in the 1946 movie Se acabaron las mujeres, directed by Ramón Peón. She co-starred in the 1949 Mexican film El Rey del Barrio, opposite Silvia Pinal and Tin-Tan. Kauffman also starred or appeared in films throughout the Golden Age of Mexican cinema, including the 1950 film También de Dolor se Canta, starring Pedro Infante, and films opposite Adalberto Martínez.

She retired at age 72.

== Personal life ==
Kauffman married three times, with each marriage ending in divorce. She had four sons and a daughter during her three marriages. Her eldest sons, actor Humberto Elizondo and David, were born during her first marriage to Mexican diplomat Humberto Elizondo Alardine. Her two other sons from her second marriage, Moisés and Abraham, died in separate accidents during the 1980s.

Kauffman retired from acting and comedy when she was 72 years old. She explained that she realized she was tired while waiting to go on stage for a performance in New York City. She claimed that she decided to retire that day. Kauffman also came to believe that audiences no longer laughed at her jokes as they once did.

=== Death ===
Kauffman died in the early morning of February 21, 2009, of natural causes at a hospital in Mexico City at the age of 84. Kauffman had been named a recipient of the 2008 Golden Ariel, the highest award in the Mexican film industry, shortly before her death. She was awarded the Ariel Award posthumously. She was survived by three of her five children.

== Selected filmography ==
- The King of the Neighborhood (1949)
- One also sings from pain (1950)
- Sinbad the Seasick (1950)
- Oh Darling! Look What You've Done! (1951)
- My Father Was at Fault (1953)
- The Viscount of Monte Cristo (1954)
- Bluebeard (1955)
- Trip to the Moon (1958)
- The Phantom of the Operetta (1960)
- The Paper Man (1963)
- The Distracted Stork (1966)
- The valley of the miserable (1975)
- Lola the Truck Driver (1983)
- The Kidnapping of Lola (1986)
