= Rough But Respectable =

- Directed by: Gilberto Martínez Solares
- Written by: Juan García; Antonio Guzmán Aguilera; Gilberto Martínez Solares; Paulino Masip
- Produced by: Felipe Mier
- Starring: Germán Valdés "Tin-Tan"; Rosita Quintana
- Cinematography: Agustín Martínez Solares
- Edited by: José W. Bustos
- Music by: Rosalío Ramírez; Federico Ruiz
- Production company: AS Films
- Release date: 16 June 1949
- Running time: 110 minutes
- Country: Mexico
- Language: Spanish

Rough But Respectable or I Am a Chic Charro (Spanish: Soy charro de levita) is a 1949 Mexican comedy film written and directed by Gilberto Martínez Solares, and starring Germán Valdés "Tin-Tan" and Rosita Quintana.

== Partial cast ==
- Germán Valdés as Tin Tan
- Marcelo Chávez as Marcelo
- Rosita Quintana as Rosita García
- Carmen Molina as Carmelita
- Arturo Martínez as Sotol
- Felipe de Alba as Enrique Méndez
- Julio Villarreal as Don Agripino
- Óscar Pulido as Don Melitón Dávila, presidente municipal
- Juan García as Sanforizado
- Queta Lavat as Leonor Dávila
- Emma Roldán as La Coronela
- Jorge Arriaga as Teófilo
- Lupe Inclán as Portera
- Nicolás Rodríguez as Don Hermilo
- Dolores Corona

== Bibliography ==
- Holmstrom, John. The moving picture boy: an international encyclopaedia from 1895 to 1995. Michael Russell, 1996.
