= The Mark of the Skunk =

1950 film

- Directed by: Gilberto Martínez Solares
- Written by: Juan García; Gilberto Martínez Solares
- Produced by: Ana María Escobedo; Felipe Mier
- Starring: Germán Valdés; Silvia Pinal
- Cinematography: Jorge Stahl Jr.
- Edited by: José W. Bustos
- Music by: Rosalío Ramírez; Federico Ruiz
- Production company: AS Films
- Release date: 15 June 1950
- Running time: 105 minutes
- Country: Mexico
- Language: Spanish

The Mark of the Skunk (Spanish: La marca del zorrillo) is a 1950 Mexican comedy adventure film written and directed by Gilberto Martínez Solares and starring Germán Valdés "Tin-Tan", Silvia Pinal and the Julian Sisters. It is a parody of The Mark of Zorro. It was shot at the Churubusco Studios in Mexico City. The film's sets were designed by the art director Manuel Fontanals.

== Synopsis ==
In California in the 1840, a foppish young aristocrat becomes a fighter for justice against the corrupt governor after a potion given him by a witch makes his temporarily invincible.

== Cast ==
- Germán Valdés "Tin-Tan" as Tin / El vizconde de Texmelucan
- Silvia Pinal as Lupita
- Marcelo Chávez as Don Marcelo de Toluca, el gobernador
- Rafael Alcayde as Capitán don Gaspar de Cadereyta
- Hortensia Constance as Doña Leonor de Tijuana
- Juan García as Pitaya
- Lupe Inclán as La bruja
- Rafael Banquells as Oficial
- José René Ruiz as Enano
- Joaquín García Vargas as Cocinero
- Gregorio Acosta as Guardia
- Stephen Berne as Cliente posada
- Magdalena Estrada as Clienta posada
- José Luis Fernández as Cliente posada
- Emilio Garibay as Guardia
- Leonor Gómez as Clienta posada
- Regino Herrera as Guardia
- Araceli Julián as Cantante
- Elena Julián as Cantante
- Rosalía Julián as Cantante
- José Ortega as Guardia
- Joaquín Roche as Notario
- Humberto Rodríguez
- Ángela Rodríguez as Invitada a fiesta
- Guillermina Téllez Girón as Invitada fiesta
- Manuel 'Loco' Valdés as Empleado
- Ramón Valdés as Guardia
- Hernán Vera as Posadero

== Bibliography ==
- Monsiváis, Carlos & Kraniauskas, John. Mexican Postcards. Verso, 1997.
- Navitski, Rielle & Poppe, Nicolas (ed.) Cosmopolitan Film Cultures in Latin America, 1896–1960. Indiana University Press, 2017.
