= Oh Darling! Look What You've Done! =

1951 film

Oh Darling! Look What You've Done to Me!
- Directed by: Gilberto Martínez Solares
- Written by: Gilberto Martínez Solares; Juan García
- Produced by: Óscar J. Brooks; Ernesto Enríquez; Felipe Mier
- Starring: Germán Valdés "Tin-Tan"; Rebeca Iturbide; Fannie Kauffan "Vitola"
- Cinematography: Ezequiel Carrasco
- Edited by: José W. Bustos
- Music by: Luis Hernández Bretón
- Production company: Mier y Brooks
- Release date: 23 November 1951
- Running time: 85 minutes
- Country: Mexico
- Language: Spanish

Oh Darling! Look What You've Done To Me! (Spanish: ¡Ay amor... cómo me has puesto!) is a 1951 Mexican romantic comedy film written and directed by Gilberto Martínez Solares, and starring Germán Valdés "Tin-Tan", Rebeca Iturbide and Fannie Kauffan "Vitola". It was shot at the Tepeyac Studios in Mexico City. The film's sets were designed by the art director José Rodríguez Granada.

== Synopsis ==
A bakery delivery man falls in love with a middle-class woman after helping her following an accident, but her family object to him.

== Cast ==
- Germán Valdés as Tin Tan
- Rebeca Iturbide as Margarita
- Marcelo Chávez as Patrón de la Panaderia
- Fannie Kauffman as Vitola
- Jorge Reyes as Doctor Esteban
- Mimí Derba as Doña Beatriz, mamá de Margarita
- Arturo Soto Rangel as don Manuel, padre de Margarita
- Pascual García Peña as Ranilla
- Lucrecia Muñoz as Lupita
- José René Ruiz as Pepito
- Club de Foot-Ball Marte
- Armando Arriola as Enfermero
- Stephen Berne as man in the cantina
- Enrique Carrillo as Policía
- Fernando Curiel as Doctor
- Magdalena Estrada as Esposa del patrón
- Leonor Gómez as Doña Rupertota
- Ismael Larumbe as Héctor Ramírez, novio de Margarita
- Elvira Lodi as Tía de margarita
- Chel López as Doctor
- Gloria Mestre as Martita
- Kika Meyer as Vecina
- José Ortega as Doctor
- Ángela Rodríguez as Vecina
- Manuel Sánchez Navarro as Tío Roberto
- Ramón Sánchez as Panadero
- Manuel 'Loco' Valdés as Hombre en cantina
- Ramón Valdés as Panadero
- Hernán Vera as Hombre encarcelado
- Acela Vidaurri as Amiga de Lupita

== Bibliography ==
- Carlos Monsiváis & John Kraniauskas. Mexican Postcards. Verso, 1997.
