= Hot Rhumba =

1952 film

- Directed by: Gilberto Martínez Solares
- Written by: Ernesto Cortázar; Fernando Galiana
- Produced by: Óscar J. Brooks; Ernesto Enríquez; Felipe Mier
- Starring: Adalberto Martínez «Resortes» Lilia Prado; Rosa de Castilla; Gloria Mestre
- Cinematography: Raúl Martínez Solares
- Edited by: Carlos Savage
- Music by: Manuel Esperón
- Production companies: Producciones Mier & Brooks
- Distributed by: Clasa-Mohme
- Release date: 27 November 1952
- Running time: 91 minutes
- Country: Mexico
- Language: Spanish

Hot Rhumba (Spanish: Rumba caliente) is a 1952 Mexican musical comedy film directed by Gilberto Martínez Solares and starring Adalberto Martínez «Resortes», Lilia Prado, Rosa de Castilla and Gloria Mestre. It was shot at the Churubusco Studios in Mexico City. The film's sets were designed by the art director José Rodríguez Granada.

== Cast ==
- Adalberto Martínez as Resortes
- Lilia Prado as Ticha Mendoza
- Óscar Pulido as Don Monchi
- Gloria Mestre as Lily
- Isolina Carrillo as Isolina
- Pascual García Peña as León Manzo
- Manuel Trejo Morales as Gerardo
- Hernán Vera as Don Manuel, dueño cabaret
- Georgina González as Fichera acompaña Resortes
- Emilio Garibay as Fulgencio Sotelo
- Pepe Ruiz Vélez as Anunciador
- Lucrecia Muñoz as Ojitos, bailarina
- Bertha Lehar as Rosaura Rodríguez
- Javier de la Parra as Locutor de radio
- Elena Luquín as Bailarina
- Rosa de Castilla as Rosita

== Bibliography ==
- Riera, Emilio García. Historia documental del cine mexicano: 1951-1952. Universidad de Guadalajara, 1992.
- Wilt, David E. The Mexican Filmography, 1916 through 2001. McFarland, 2024.
