= You've Got Me By the Wing =

1953 film

- Directed by: Gilberto Martínez Solares
- Written by: Ramón Obón; Gregorio Walerstein
- Produced by: Gregorio Walerstein
- Starring: Germán Valdés; Silvia Pinal; Aurora Segura
- Cinematography: Agustín Martínez Solares
- Edited by: Rafael Ceballos
- Music by: Manuel Esperón
- Production company: Filmex
- Release date: 5 February 1953
- Running time: 90 minutes
- Country: Mexico
- Language: Spanish

You've Got Me By the Wing (Spanish: Me traes de un ala) is a 1953 Mexican comedy film produced and written by Gregorio Walerstein, directed by Gilberto Martínez Solares and starring Germán Valdés "Tin-Tan", Silvia Pinal and Aurora Segura.

== Cast ==
- Germán Valdés as Tin Tan
- Silvia Pinal as Rosita Alba Vírez
- José María Linares-Rivas as Gámez
- Aurora Segura as María Celis
- Fernando Soto "Mantequilla" as Narciso
- Marcelo Chávez as Jiménez
- Maruja Grifell as Eulalia
- Wolf Ruvinskis as Mayordomo
- Juan García as Jefe de redacción
- Joaquín García "Borolas" as Comisario
- Guillermo Hernández as Criado
- Pepe Hernández as Guardia
- Pompín Iglesias as Policía
- Araceli Julián as Cantante
- Elena Julián as Cantante
- Rosalía Julián as Cantante
- Vicente Lara as Vendedor de cigarros
- Consuelo Monteagudo as Adelaida - cantante ridícula
- José Ortega as Ojitos de celuloide
- José Pardavé
- Francisco Reiguera
- Humberto Rodríguez
- Julio Sotelo as Anunciador teatro
- Rafael Torres as Mesero
- Antonio Valdés
- Manuel 'Loco' Valdés as Bailarín
- Ramón Valdés as González
- Guillermo Álvarez Bianchi as Hombre contesta teléfono

== Bibliography ==
- Amador, María Luisa. Cartelera cinematográfica, 1950-1959. UNAM, 1985.
