= Tender Pumpkins =

1949 Mexican film by Gilberto Martínez Solares

- Directed by: Gilberto Martínez Solares
- Written by: Juan García; Eduardo Ugarte; Gilberto Martínez Solares
- Produced by: Jorge Elizondo; Salvador Elizondo
- Starring: Germán Valdés; Rosita Quintana; Nelly Montiel; Gloria Alonso; Amalia Aguilar; Rosina Pagã.
- Cinematography: Agustín Martínez Solares
- Edited by: Jorge Busto
- Music by: Rosalío Ramírez; Federico Ruiz
- Production company: Clasa Films Mundiales
- Release date: 24 February 1949
- Running time: 101 minutes
- Country: Mexico
- Language: Spanish

Tender Pumpkins or Tender Little Pumpkins (Spanish: Calabacitas tiernas) is a 1949 Mexican comedy film written and directed by Gilberto Martínez Solares, and starring Germán Valdés "Tin-Tan", Rosita Quintana, Nelly Montiel, Gloria Alonso, Amalia Aguilar and Rosina Pagã. This film marked the acting debut of Ramón Valdés, Tin-Tan's brother, later better known for portraying Don Ramón in the 1970s sitcom El Chavo del Ocho.

== Cast ==
- Germán Valdés as Tin Tan
- Rosita Quintana as Lupe
- Nelly Montiel as Nelly
- Jorge Reyes as Reyes
- Gloria Alonso as Gloria
- Nicolás Rodríguez as Guitarist
- Francisco Reiguera as El muerto
- Juan Orraca as Architect
- Julián de Meriche as Representative
- Francisco Pando as Don Gumersindo
- Ramón Valdés as Willy
- Mario Castillo as Crew member
- Amalia Aguilar as Amalia
- Rosina Pagã as Rosina
- Marcelo Chávez as Marcelo
- Ramón Gay as Announcer
- Armando Velasco

== Bibliography ==
- Mora, Carl J. Mexican Cinema: Reflections of a Society, 1896-2004. McFarland & Co, 2005.
