= The Unknown Mariachi =

- Directed by: Gilberto Martínez Solares
- Written by: Juan García; Gilberto Martínez Solares
- Produced by: Óscar J. Brooks; Felipe Mier]] Germán Valdés
- Starring: Germán Valdés; Rosa de Castilla; Gloria Mange; Rosita Fornés
- Cinematography: José Ortiz Ramos
- Edited by: Carlos Savage
- Music by: Manuel Esperón
- Production companies: Cinematográfica Valdés; Mier y Brooks
- Release date: 30 October 1953
- Running time: 90 minutes
- Country: Mexico
- Language: Spanish

The Unknown Mariachi (Spanish:El mariachi desconocido) is a 1953 Mexican comedy film written and directed by Gilberto Martínez Solares, and starring Germán Valdés "Tin-Tan", Rosa de Castilla, Gloria Mange and Rosita Fornés.

The film's sets were designed by the art director Ramón Rodríguez Granada.

== Cast ==
- Germán Valdés "Tin-Tan" as Agustín / Tin Tan
- Rosa de Castilla as Lupita
- Gloria Mange as Yolanda
- Marcelo Chávez as Marcelo
- Tito Novaro as Manuel
- Lupe Carriles as Doña Chona, tía de Lupita
- Alta Mae Stone as Gringa en el tenampa
- Gregorio Acosta as Sacaborrachos del tenampa
- José Ortega as Ojitos de capulin
- Jorge Chesterking as Gringo en el tenampa
- Georgina González as Clienta del rebozo
- Emilio Garibay as Charro en el tenampa
- Ignacio Peón as Feriante de los caballos
- José Escanero as Don Casimiro, feriante de las pelotas
- Magda Pastor
- Rosita Fornés as Rosita
- Armando Bianchi as Señor Bianchi
- Silvia Carrill] as Bailarina
- Víctor Manuel Castro as Hombre en el tenampa
- José Chávez
- María Luisa Cortés as Pasajera en avión
- Margarito Esparza Nevare as Enano
- Eulalio González as Policía
- Leonor Gómez as Puestera
- Isabel Herrera as Espectadora en carpa
- Ángela Rodríguez as Amiga de Tin
- Magdalena Sánchez
- Manuel 'Loco' Valdés as Hombre en el tenampa
- Ramón Valdés as Detective

== Bibliography ==
- Rogelio Agrasánchez. Cine Mexicano: Posters from the Golden Age, 1936-1956. Chronicle Books, 2001.
