= Jorge Reyes (Mexican actor) =

- Born: 14 February 1907; Buenos Aires, Argentina
- Died: 29 March 1985 (aged 78); Mexico City, Mexico
- Occupation: Actor
- Years active: 1941–1970

Jorge "Che" Reyes (14 February 1907 – 29 March 1985) was an Argentine-Mexican actor. He appeared in more than seventy films from 1941 to 1970.

== Selected filmography ==
Year	Title
1941	The League of Songs
1942	The Three Musketeers
1942	I Danced with Don Porfirio
1943	Romeo and Juliet
1943	María Eugenia
1946	¡Ay qué rechula es Puebla!
1944	Summer Hotel
1946	Love Makes Them Crazy
1947	Chachita from Triana
1947	Strange Appointment
1948	Adventure in the Night
1949	Tender Pumpkins
1950	La liga de las muchachas
1950	Mi querido capitán
1950	Sinbad the Seasick
1950	Dawn of Life
1951	Oh Darling! Look What You've Done!
1951	María Montecristo
1951	Canasta uruguaya
1953	Forbidden Fruit
1955	El vendedor de muñecas
1956	El fantasma de la casa roja
