= Summer Hotel =

- Directed by: René Cardona
- Written by: Neftali Beltrán; René Cardona; Ernesto Cortázar; Ramón Pérez Peláez
- Produced by: José Sotomayor
- Cinematography: José Ortiz Ramos
- Edited by: José W. Bustos
- Music by: José Sabre Marroquín
- Release date: 13 April 1944
- Running time: 95 minutes
- Country: Mexico
- Language: Spanish

Summer Hotel (Spanish: Hotel de verano) is a 1944 Mexican musical comedy film directed by René Cardona and starring Ramón Armengod y Janice Logan. This is the first film in which debut the comedian actor Germán Valdés «Tin-Tan» and his carnal Marcelo Chávez. The film's sets were designed by Manuel Fontanals.

== Cast ==
- Carlos Amador
- Blanquita Amaro
- Ramón Armengod
- Eva Briseño
- Marcelo Chávez
- Pedro Elviro
- Camilo Farjat
- Consuelo Guerrero de Luna
- Enrique Herrera
- Rafael Icardo
- Janice Logan
- Pepe Nava
- José Pulido
- Salvador Quiroz
- Jorge Reyes
- Alma Riva
- Germán Valdés «Tin-Tan»
- Pedro Vargas
- Carlos Villarías

== Bibliography ==
- Maria Herrera-Sobek. Celebrating Latino Folklore: An Encyclopedia of Cultural Traditions. ABC-CLIO, 2012.
