= Sinbad the Seasick =

1950 film

- Directed by: Gilberto Martínez Solares
- Written by: Juan García; Gilberto Martínez Solares
- Produced by: Óscar J. Brooks; Felipe Mier
- Starring: Germán Valdés "Tin-Tan"; Telma Ferriño; Jacqueline Evans; Fannie Kauffman "Vitola"
- Cinematography: Víctor Herrera
- Edited by: Jorge Busto
- Music by: Rosalío Ramírez; Federico Ruiz; Germán Valdés
- Production companies: Cinematográfica Valdés; Mier y Brooks
- Release date: 14 October 1950
- Running time: 96 minutes
- Country: Mexico
- Language: Spanish

Sinbad the Seasick (Spanish: Simbad el mareado) is a 1950 Mexican comedy film written and directed by Gilberto Martínez Solares and starring Germán Valdés "Tin-Tan", Telma Ferriño, Jacqueline Evans and Fannie Kauffman "Vitola". It is a parody of Sinbad the Sailor. It was made at the Churubusco Studios in Mexico City while Location shooting took place in Acapulco. The film's sets were designed by the art director José Rodríguez Granada.

== Synopsis ==
Simbad, a fisherman in a resort town, considers abandoning his Mexican girlfriend to pursue a wealthy American tourist. He escapes from the present reality in a series of daydreams.

== Main cast ==
- Germán Valdés "Tin-Tan" as Simbad
- Telma Ferriño as Azucena
- Jacqueline Evans as Genevieve / Mary Smith
- Fannie Kauffman "Vitola" as La Flaca
- Marcelo Chávez as Marcelo
- Juan García as Juan, policía
- Jorge Reyes as Detective
- Wolf Ruvinskis as Hampón, novio de Mary
- Guillermina Téllez Girón as Amiga de la Flaca
- Lupe Llaca as Amiga de la Flaca
- José René Ruiz as Hampón enano
- Caridad Vázquez as Bailarina
- Mercedes Vázquez as Bailarina

== Bibliography ==
- Rogelio Agrasánchez. Cine Mexicano: Posters from the Golden Age, 1936-1956. Chronicle Books, 2001.
