= Gloria Mestre =

Mexican dancer, choreographer, and actress

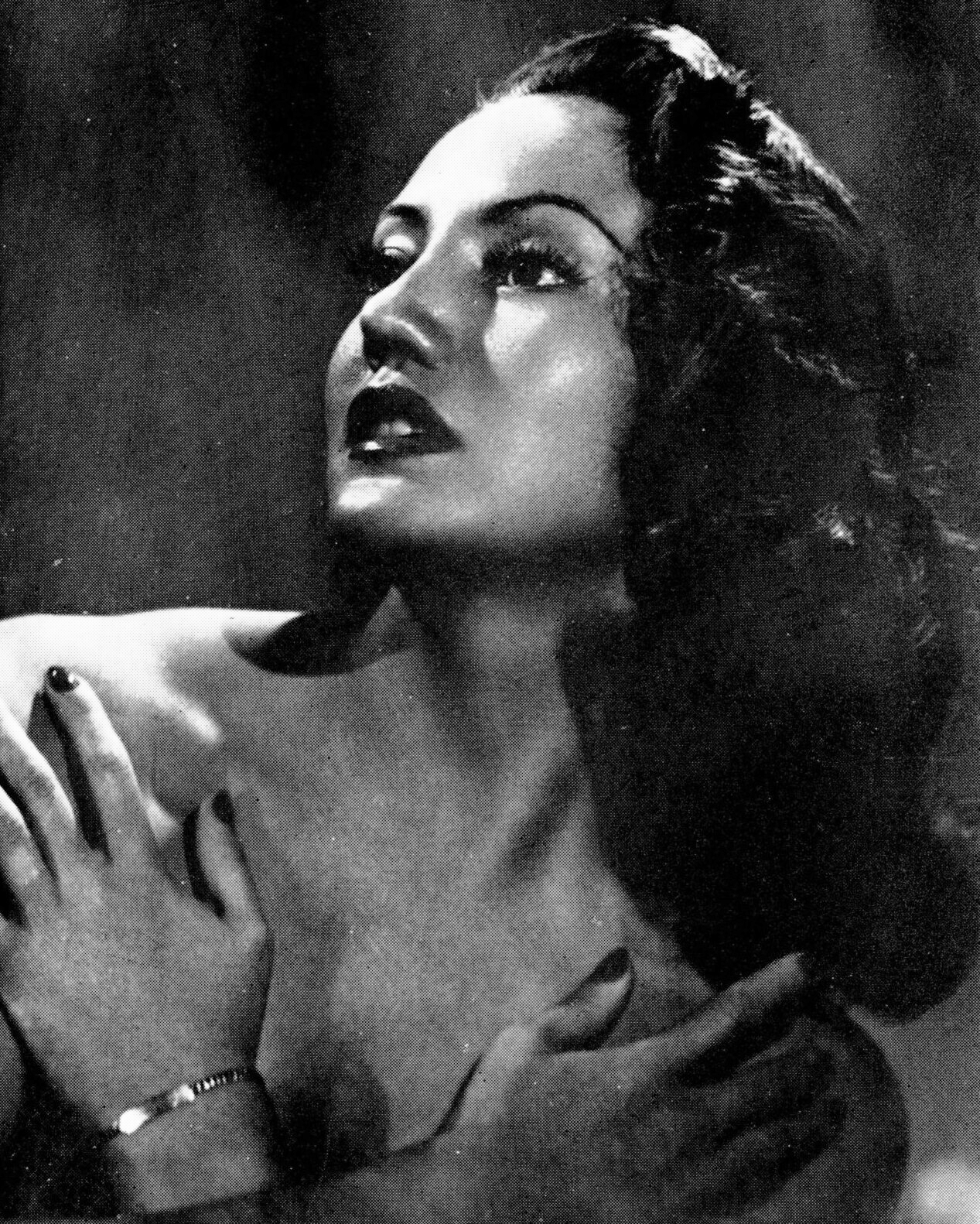
Gloria Mestre in 1954

Gloria Mestre Rodríguez (July 28, 1928 – December 9, 2012) was a Mexican dancer, choreographer, and actress in film, stage, and television.

== Early years and education ==
Born in Villahermosa, Tabasco, Mestre was the daughter of Manuel Mestre Ghigliazza, Gobernador constitucional of Tabasco, and Carmen Rodriguez. She began her dance studies at Alma Mexicana Academy, later attending the National School of Dance in Mexico City. A disciple of Martha Graham and Bronislava Nijinska, her teachers included Nellie Campobello, Tessy Marcue, and Enrique Vela Quintero.

== Career ==
After graduation, she went to work at the Instituto Nacional de Bellas Artes y Literatura (INBA). At the INBA, she took classes with Gloria Campobello. Her first public appearance with a professional troupe was in the opera Carmen, and she made her debut with the Ballet Masas Siembra in 1945. From 1946 through 1947, with the Original Ballet Ruso, she began a tour of Mexico, Cuba, Brazil and the United States. During her career, she became Prima ballerina assoluta of Naples' San Carlo Opera House; appeared at the Moulin Rouge and at the Olympia; participated in the Ballet Waldeen. She appeared in a steady stream of Mexican films from Del Can-Can del Mamo in 1951 to El Gran Moyecoyo in 1983. Mestre was a founder of the Academy of Mexican Dance of the National Association of Actors. She also founded the Ballet Chapultepec, and was the principal dancer and choreographer of the INBA's National Opera.

== Personal life ==
Mestre was married to José Silva and had one child, a daughter, Linda Silva Mestre. While recovering from respiratory problems, she died in Coyoacán in 2012, as a result of a myocardial infarction.

== Selected filmography ==
- The Lovers (1951)
- Oh Darling! Look What You've Done! (1951)
- The Beautiful Dreamer (1952)
- The Night Is Ours (1952)
- Now I Am Rich (1952)
- The Three Happy Friends (1952)
- Hot Rhumba (1952)
- God Created Them (1953)
- Northern Border (1953)
- Pompey the Conqueror (1953)
- Genius and Figure (1953)
- The Sword of Granada (1953)
- Music and Money (1958)
- Foxhole in Cairo (1960)
