= Rebel Without a House =

- Directed by: Benito Alazraki
- Written by: Pancho Córdova (adaptation)
- Story by: Julio Porter; Abel Santa Cruz (as Abel Santacruz)
- Produced by: Miguel Zacarías
- Starring: Germán Valdés; Ana Bertha Lepe
- Cinematography: Jorge Stahl Jr.
- Edited by: José W. Bustos
- Music by: Gustavo César Carrión
- Production company: Producciones Zacarías
- Release date: 14 April 1960
- Running time: 84 minutes
- Country: Mexico
- Language: Spanish

Rebel Without a House (Spanish:Rebelde sin casa) is a 1960 Mexican comedy film directed by Benito Alazraki and starring Germán Valdés "Tin-Tan" and Ana Bertha Lepe.

== Cast ==
- Germán Valdés "Tin-Tan" as Teodoro Silva
- Ana Bertha Lepe as Julieta
- Óscar Ortiz de Pinedo as Don Virgilio Danuncio
- Carlos Riquelme as Lic. Vivaldi
- Marcelo Chávez as Señor San Pedro
- Arturo Soto Rangel as Señor juez
- Hortensia Clavijo as Secuaz de San Pedro
- Josefina Holguín as Secuaz de San Pedro
- Salvador Flores as Agustín
- Salvador Gómez
- Yolanda Margain
- Armando Acosta as Policía
- Daniel Arroyo as Espectador
- Carlos Bravo y Fernández
- Blanca Carrera
- Ángel Di Stefani as Hombre infiel
- Enedina Díaz de León as Espectadora
- Pedro Elviro as Cuidador
- Jesús Gómez as Policía
- Leonor Gómez as Vendedora de papaya
- Guillermo Hernández as Criminal pelón
- Chel López as Inspector
- Concepción Martínez as Anciana escucha radio
- Roberto Meyer as Policía
- José Muñoz as Dueño carro robado
- Rubén Márquez as Espectador
- Carlos Robles Gil as Espectador
- Hernán Vera as Tendero

== Bibliography ==
- Carlos Monsiváis & John Kraniauskas. Mexican Postcards. Verso, 1997.
