= Jacqueline Evans =

British-Mexican actress (1914-1989)

- Born: 17 January 1914; Islington, United Kingdom
- Died: 22 June 1989 (aged 75); Acapulco, Mexico
- Other name: Grace Alice Evans Antrobus
- Occupation: Actress
- Years active: 1946-1986 (film & TV)

Jacqueline Evans (born 17 January 1914) was a British-born Mexican film actress. Evans was born on 17 January 1914 in Islington, London. She made her first film appearance in the 1946 film Walking on Air in a minor role. Her first larger role came two years later when she played the part of Cassandra in the 1948 film Adventures of Casanova starring Arturo de Córdova. In 1950 Evans got her first leading role in the comedy/fantasy film Simbad el mareado. Evans is best known for playing the part of Rebecca Boone in the 1956 western Daniel Boone, Trail Blazer which starred Bruce Bennett. Evans last appearance was in the murder mystery Murder in Three Acts which was based on the book by Agatha Christie, Three Act Tragedy and saw Peter Ustinov take on the role of Hercule Poirot. On 22 June 1989 Evans died aged 75.

Evans also took part in motorracing, like the 1953 and 1954 Carrera Panamericana.

== Filmography ==
Year	Title	Role	Notes
1946	Walking on Air		
1948	Adventures of Casanova	Cassandra	
1950	Sinbad the Seasick	Genevieve / Mary Smith	
1951	El Suavecito	Gringa	
1952	Vive como sea		
1952	El cuarto cerrado		
1954	La Calle de los amores	Sara Oliver	
1954	Sindicato de telemirones	Gringa	
1956	Daniel Boone, Trail Blazer	Rebecca Boone	
1956	¡Que seas feliz!		
1957	The Sun Also Rises	Mrs. Braddock	Uncredited
1958	The Bravados	Mrs. Barnes	Uncredited
1960	Cuando ¡Viva Villa..! es la muerte	Sra. Pianni	
1960	Tarzan the Magnificent	Mrs. Dexter	
1961	The Singer Not the Song	Dona Marian	
1966	Daniel Boone: Frontier Trail Rider	Martha Bliss	
1970	Gregorio y su ángel		
1970	Paraíso	Lillian	
1971	Lawman	Saloon Girl	Uncredited
1973	Peluquero de señoras	Invitada a fiesta	
1979	Guyana: Cult of the Damned	Commune Member	
1980	Frontera brava		
1982	Missing	Woman - Ford Foundation	
1983	Triumphs of a Man Called Horse	Old woman	
1985	Volunteers	Aunt Eunice	
1985	Historias violentas		(segment 5 "Noche de paz")
1986	Murder in Three Acts	Mrs. Babbington	TV movie, (final film role)

== Bibliography ==
- Daryl E. Murphy. Carrera Panamericana: History of the Mexican Road Race, 1950-54. iUniverse, 2008.
