= The Vagabond (1953 film) =

- Directed by: Gilberto Martínez Solares; Rogelio A. González
- Written by: Carlos León; Rogelio A. González
- Produced by: Óscar J. Brooks; Felipe Mier
- Starring: Germán Valdés; Leonor Llausás; Aurora Segura
- Cinematography: Raúl Martínez Solares
- Edited by: Carlos Savage
- Music by: Manuel Esperón
- Production company: Mier y Brooks
- Release date: 1 July 1953
- Running time: 95 minutes
- Country: Mexico
- Language: Spanish

The Vagabond (Spanish:El vagabundo) is a 1953 Mexican comedy film directed by Rogelio A. González and Gilberto Martínez Solares, and starring Germán Valdés "Tin-Tan", Leonor Llausás and Aurora Segura. This film features the film debut of Llausás.

== Cast ==
- Germán Valdés "Tin-Tan"
- Leonor Llausás
- Wolf Ruvinskis
- Marcelo Chávez
- Aurora Segura
- Felipe Montoya
- Georgina González
- José Ortiz de Zárate
- José Ortega
- Francisco Pando
- Emilio Garibay
- Enrique Carrillo
- José Chávez
- Jesús Gómez
- Manuel Trejo Morales
- Ramón Valdés
- Rodolfo Calvo
- Diana Ochoa
- León Barroso
- Rogelio Fernández
- Leonor Gómez
- Paco Martínez
- Ignacio Peón
- Joaquín Roche
- Humberto Rodríguez
- Pepe Ruiz Vélez

== Bibliography ==
- Baugh, Scott L. Latino American Cinema: An Encyclopedia of Movies, Stars, Concepts, and Trends. ABC-CLIO, 2012.
