= Yolanda Montes =

Mexican-American dancer, actress and vedette (1932–2025)

Yolanda Montes "Tongolele"
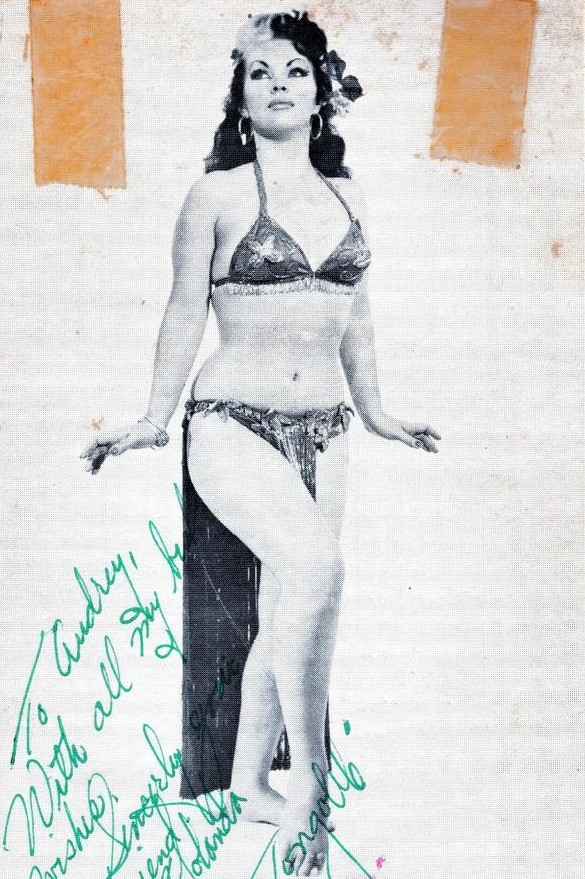
- Montes, c. 1950s
- Born: Yolanda Ivonne Montes Farrington; January 3, 1932; Spokane, Washington, U.S.
- Died: February 16, 2025 (aged 93); Puebla, Mexico
- Occupations: Vedette; dancer; actress
- Years active: 1947–2013
- Spouse(s): Joaquín González (m.1956–1996, his death)
- Children: 2

Yolanda Montes (January 3, 1932 – February 16, 2025), better known by her stage-name Tongolele, was a Mexican–American dancer, actress and vedette. At the time of her death, she was one of the last surviving stars from the Golden Age of Mexican Cinema.

== Early life ==
Tongolele was born Yolanda Ivonne Montes Farrington in Spokane, Washington, United States, in 1932. As a child, she danced for the International Ballet of San Francisco, California, as part of a Tahitian revue.

In 1947, she moved to Mexico and was hired as a dancer by Américo Mancini, a theater impresario. She also appeared in the famous Cabaret Tívoli in Mexico City. Her stage name, "Tongolele", came from mixing African and Tahitian words.

== Career ==
Tongolele boosted the success of the Exóticas, a group of vedettes that caused a sensation in Mexico in the late 1940s and early 1950s. Although other vedettes appeared and became popular at the time (such as "Kalantán", "Bongala" and Su Muy Key), none reached the levels of popularity of Tongolele. Yolanda was baptized by Mexican journalist Carlos Estrada Lang as "The Queen of Tahitian Dances", as each night she drew a large male audience who adored her perfect silhouette and feline movements that marked an era in Mexico.

She made her film debut in 1948 in the film Nocturne of Love, starring the actress Miroslava Stern. In 1948, she starred in the film ¡Han matado a "Tongolele"!, directed by Roberto Gavaldón. The plot was developed in the Folies Bergère theater of Mexico City. At another level of the plot, several envious people attempted to assassinate her. The film premiered on September 30, 1948.

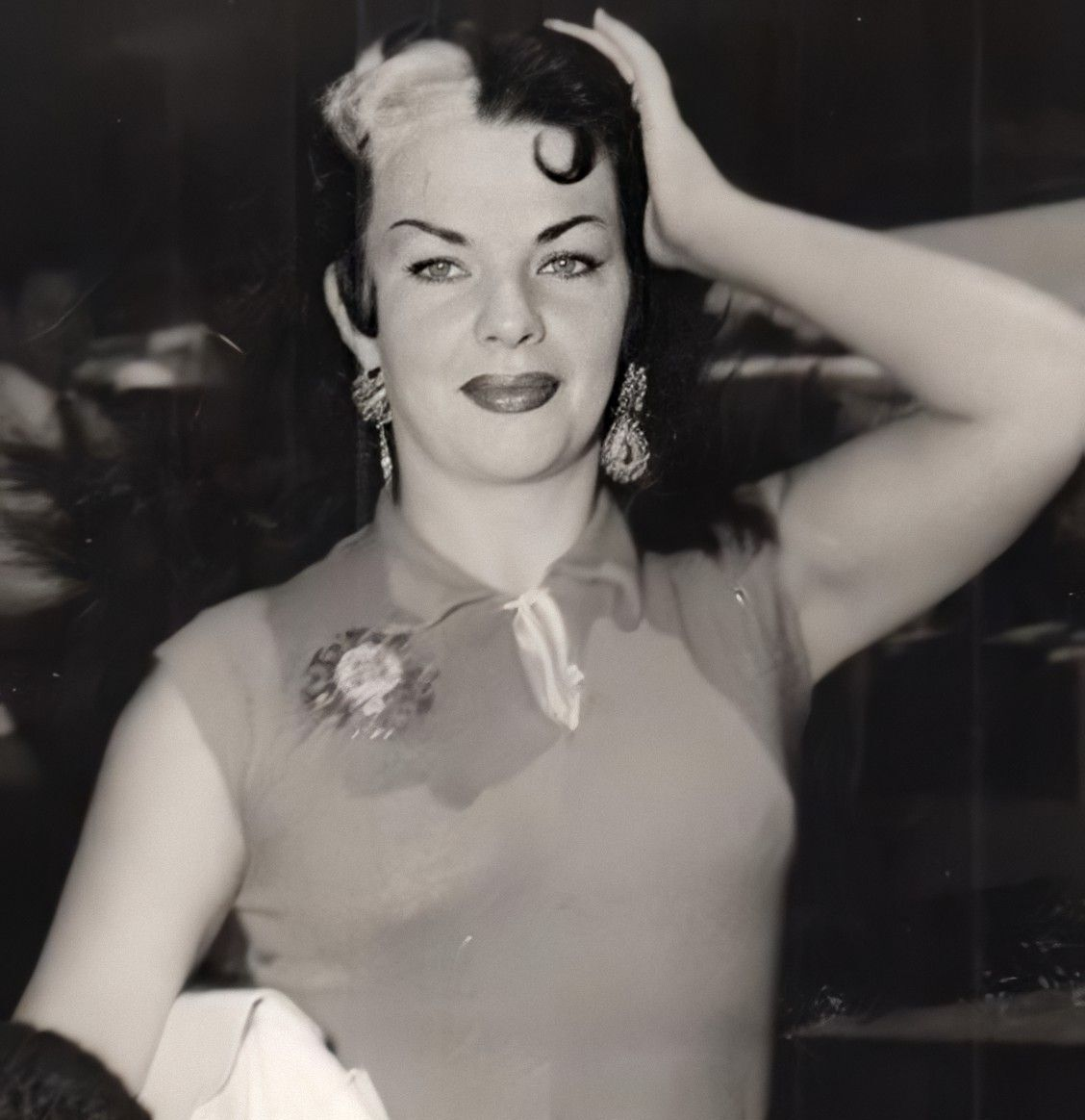
Montes in 1955

As a guest, she starred in El rey del barrio (1949) and Kill Me Because I'm Dying! (1951) and the musical Música de siempre (1956).

In 1971, Tongolele played in the Mexican-American co-production Isle of the Snake People. In the film, she appeared alongside the American actor Boris Karloff. The plot of the film was located on a small island in the middle of the ocean where some beautiful young women are transformed into blue-faced man-eating zombies. Tongolele played the role of Kalea, the dancer with the snake. In the mid-1960s, CBS recorded a disc titled "Tongolele sings for you", which included 10 songs.

With the rise of Mexico City's nightlife in the 1970s and the rise of the vedettes, Tongolele resumed her career in nightclubs and movies, as well as appearing on television shows. In 1984 she debuted in telenovelas in a special performance in the melodrama La pasión de Isabela. In 2001, she reappeared on Mexican television in the telenovela Salomé. Between 2011 and 2013, Tongolele participated in the musical stage play Perfume of Gardenia.

== Personal life and death ==
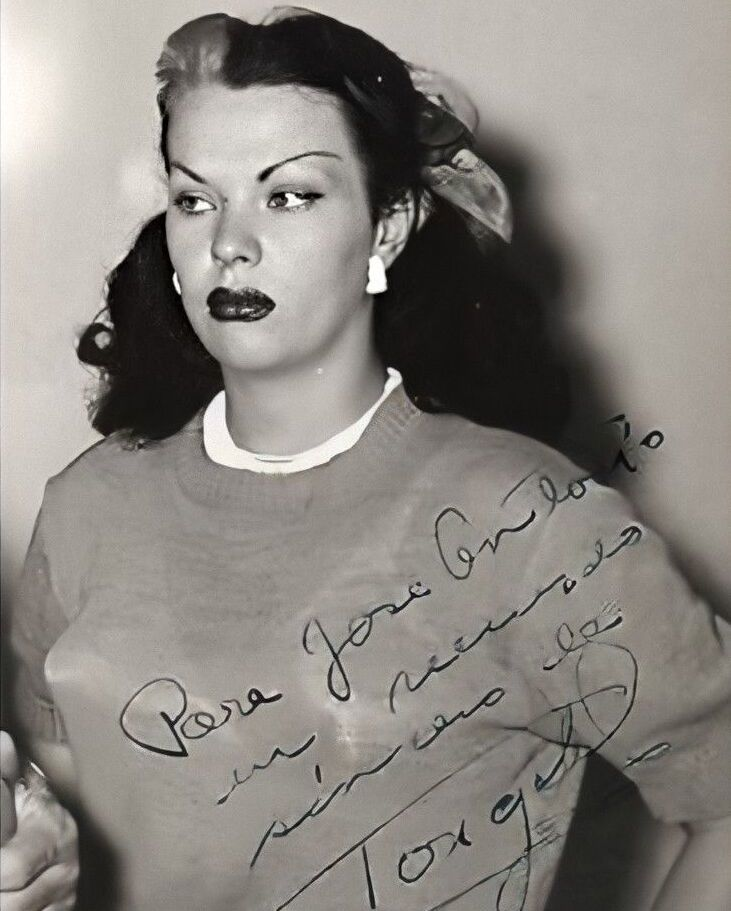
Tongolele, c. 1950s.

In 1956, she married Cuban Joaquín González in New York City, who accompanied her until his death. In 1976, Joaquín suffered cardiac problems and he was given a pacemaker. On December 22, 1996, he died. With González, she had twin sons.

Montes died on February 16, 2025, at the age of 93.

== Filmography ==
=== Films ===
- Nocturne of Love (1948)
- ¡Han matado a "Tongolele"! (1948)
- El rey del barrio (1949)
- Kill Me Because I'm Dying! (1951)
- Chucho the Mended (1952)
- The Mystery of the Express Car (1953)
- Pensión de artistas (1956)
- Música de siempre (1956)
- The Panthera Women (1967)
- El crepúsculo de un Dios (1968)
- Isle of the Snake People (1971)
- Las fabulosas del reventón (1981)
- Las noches del Blanquita (1981)
- Las fabulosas del reventón II (1982)
- Teatro Follies (1983)
- El fantástico mundo de Juan Orol (2012)

=== Television ===
- La pasión de Isabela (1984)
- Salomé (2001)

== Bibliography ==
- Su, Margo; Leduc, Renato (1989) Alta Frivolidad (High Frivolity), México, ed. Cal y Arena, ISBN 9789684931879
- García Hernández, Arturo (1998) No han matado a "Tongolele" (They have not killed "Tongolele"), México, ed. La Jornada Ediciones, ISBN 9789686719383
- Agrasánchez Jr., Rogelio (2001) Bellezas del Cine Mexicano (Beauties of the Mexican Cinema), México, ed. Archivo fílmico Agrasánchez, ISBN 968-5077-11-8
