= La vida inútil de Pito Pérez =

1938 novel by José Rubén Romero

La vida inútil de Pito Pérez is a novel by Mexican author José Rubén Romero, which was first published in 1938. The novel follows the picaresque genre. The protagonist Jesús "Pito Pérez" travels the world then returns to his hometown Santa Clara del Cobre and recounts his adventures.

A film by the same name was made in 1944 by filmmaker Miguel Contreras Torres.
