= The King of the Neighborhood =

1949 Mexican film by Gilberto Martínez Solares

El Rey del Barrio
- Directed by: Gilberto Martínez Solares
- Starring: Germán Valdés "Tin-Tan"; Silvia Pinal; Fannie Kauffman "Vitola"
- Release date: 1950
- Running time: 100 minutes
- Country: Mexico
- Language: Spanish

The King of the Neighborhood (Spanish: El rey del barrio) is a 1950 Mexican comedy film, written and directed by Gilberto Martínez Solares, and starring Germán Valdés "Tin-Tan" and Silvia Pinal. This film marked the acting debut of José René Ruiz Martínez "Tun-Tun" and Fannie Kauffman "Vitola".

It has been included in a list of the twenty most important movies in Mexican film history.

== Synopsis ==
Tin Tan is a highly popular inhabitant of his neighborhood, where he has a faithful band of followers. He leads a double life as a railroad worker by day and thief by night. He's trying to woo Carmelita, the prettiest girl there, and the many mishaps that happen while doing this.

== Cast ==
- Germán Valdés as Tin Tan
- Silvia Pinal as Carmelita
- Marcelo Chávez as Marcelo, policeman
- Fannie Kauffman "Vitola" as La Nena
- Juan García as El Peralvillo
- Yolanda Montes "Tongolele" as Herself
- Ramón Valdés as El Norteño
- José Jasso "El Ojón"
