= Hernán Vera =

Mexican actor (1892–1964)

- Born: Hernán Rogelio Vera Pavía; 28 October 1892; Mérida, Yucatán, Mexico
- Died: 29 January 1964 (aged 71); Mexico City, Mexico
- Occupation: Actor

Hernán Rogelio Vera Pavía (28 October 1892 – 29 January 1964) was a Mexican actor known for usually playing short, small roles, usually as a bartender, during the Golden Age of Mexican cinema.

He began his career in theater, with some works by author Antonio Esquivel Magaña. He also belonged to the Alfonso Rogelini zarzuela company in 1925.

His first film was Allá en el Rancho Grande (1936) by director Fernando de Fuentes. He worked in more than 200 films and although his participation in them was usually short, his characters tended to be related to the main characters.

== Selected filmography ==
- Allá en el Rancho Grande (1936)
- Poppy of the Road (1937)
- Mi candidato (1938)
- Huapango (1938)
- Café Concordia (1939)
- With Villa's Veterans (1939)
- Three Peasants on a Donkey (1939)
- The Rock of Souls (1942)
- The Spectre of the Bride (1943)
- The Shack (1945)
- A Day with the Devil (1945)
- The Queen of the Tropics (1946)
- Five Faces of Woman (1947)
- Felipe Was Unfortunate (1947)
- Ecija's Seven Children (1947)
- The Secret of Juan Palomo (1947)
- I Am a Charro of Rancho Grande (1947)
- The Private Life of Mark Antony and Cleopatra (1947)
- Music, Poetry and Madness (1948)
- Los tres huastecos (1948)
- The Lady of the Veil (1949)
- Midnight (1949)
- Zorina (1949)
- Hypocrite (1949)
- Primero soy mexicano (1950)
- Cuatro contra el mundo (1950)
- Duel in the Mountains (1950)
- The Mark of the Skunk (1950)
- A Gringo Girl in Mexico (1951)
- They Say I'm a Communist (1951)
- Maria Islands (1951)
- Port of Temptation (1951)
- Oh Darling! Look What You've Done! (1951)
- Soledad's Shawl (1952)
- Hot Rhumba (1952)
- Penjamo (1953)
- The Lottery Ticket Seller (1953)
- Madness of Love (1953)
- Dona Mariquita of My Heart (1953)
- Anxiety (1953)
- You Had To Be a Gypsy (1953)
- God Created Them (1953)
- When I Leave (1954)
- The Viscount of Monte Cristo (1954)
- Father Against Son (1955)
- Bluebeard (1955)
- Las aventuras de Pito Pérez (1957)
- A Few Drinks (1958)
- Rebel Without a House (1960)
- Invincible Guns (1960)
- Dangers of Youth (1960)

== Bibliography ==
- Magaña-Esquivel, Antonio; Ceballos, Edgar. 2000. Imagen y realidad del teatro en México, 1533-1960. México, D.F.: Instituto Nacional de Bellas Artes.
