= The Night Falls =

1952 film

- Film poster
- Directed by: Roberto Gavaldón
- Written by: Jesús Cárdenas; Roberto Gavaldón; José Revueltas; Luis Spota
- Produced by: Óscar J. Brooks; Felipe Mier
- Starring: Pedro Armendáriz; Anita Blanch; Rebeca Iturbide
- Cinematography: Jack Draper
- Edited by: Charles L. Kimball
- Music by: Raúl Lavista
- Production company: Producciones Mier y Brooks
- Distributed by: Producciones Mier y Brooks
- Release date: 24 April 1952
- Running time: 85 minutes
- Country: Mexico
- Language: Spanish

The Night Falls (Spanish: La noche avanza) is a 1952 Mexican crime film noir directed by Roberto Gavaldón and starring Pedro Armendáriz, Anita Blanch and Rebeca Iturbide. Armendáriz delivers a particularly energetic performance. The film's sets were designed by the art director Edward Fitzgerald.

== Cast ==
- Pedro Armendáriz as Marcos Arizmendi
- Anita Blanch as Sara
- Rebeca Iturbide as Rebeca Villarreal
- Eva Martino as Lucrecia
- José María Linares-Rivas as Marcial
- Julio Villarreal as Sr. Villarreal
- Armando Soto La Marina as Chicote
- Juan García as Esbirro de Marcial
- Carlos Múzquiz as Armando Villarreal
- Wolf Ruvinskis as Bodoques
- Francisco Jambrina as Luis
- Roberto Y. Palacios as Li Chan
- Margarito Luna as Esbirro de Marcial
- Carlos Riquelme
- Luis Mussot as Médico
- José Torvay as Policía
- Pedro Andrinúa as Pelotari
- Ignacio Echeverría as Pelotari
- Gabriel De Pablo as Pelotari
- José María Urrutia as Pelotari
- Aquiles Elorduy as Pelotari
- Jaime Inchandurrieta as Pelotari
- Francisco Úbeda as Pelotari
- Ricardo Adalid as Pelotari
- Jorge Chesterking as Cliente cabaret
- Genaro de Alba as Pelotari
- Felipe de Flores as Empleado aeropuerto
- Agustín Fernández as Pelotari
- Héctor Godoy as Recepcionista del Hotel
- Héctor Mateos as Policía
- Álvaro Matute as Pelotari
- Luis Mussot hijo as Limpiabotas
- Ignacio Peón as Espectador Jai alai
- Humberto Rodríguez as Joyero
- Alfredo Varela padre as Médico en los vestidores

== Bibliography ==
- R. Hernandez-Rodriguez. Splendors of Latin Cinema. ABC-CLIO, 2009.
