= No me defiendas compadre =

- Directed by: Giberto Martínez Solares
- Produced by: Fernando de Fuentes
- Starring: Germán Valdés; Rosita Quintana
- Release date: 1949
- Country: Mexico
- Language: Spanish

No me defiendas compadre ("Don't defend me, friend") is a 1949 Mexican comedy film written and directed by Giberto Martínez Solares and starring Germán Valdés "Tin-Tan" and Rosita Quintana. This film marked the film debut of the Latvian actor and professional wrestler, Wolf Ruvinskis.
