= Germán Valdés =

Mexican actor, comedian and singer (1915–1973)

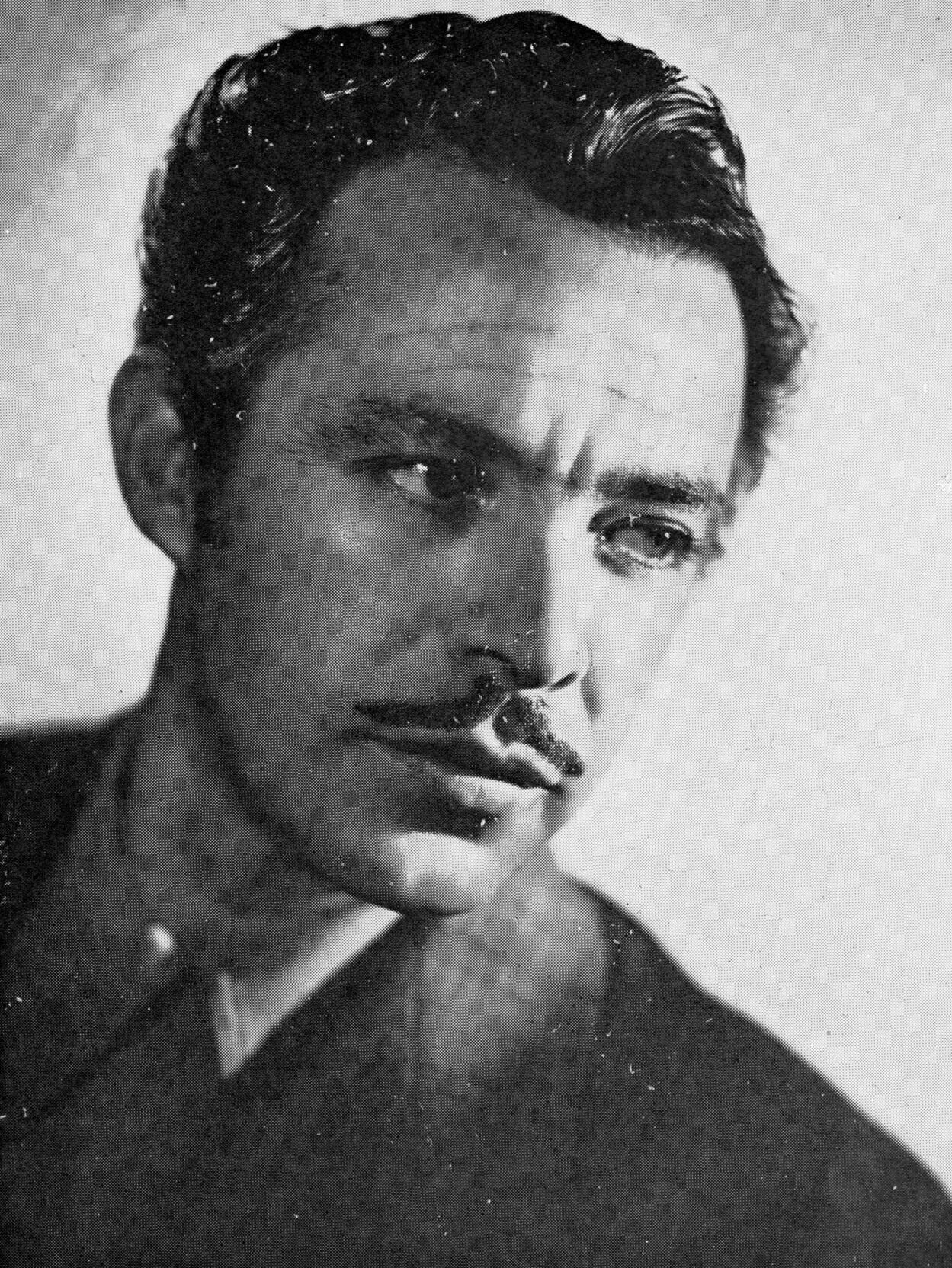
- Valdés in 1954
- Born: Germán Genaro Cipriano Teodoro Gómez Valdés y Castillo; 19 September 1915; Ciudad de Mexico, Mexico
- Died: 29 June 1973 (aged 57); Mexico City, Mexico
- Other name: Tin-Tan
- Occupation: Actor
- Years active: 1943–1973
- Spouses: Magdalena Martinez m. 1937-1948; Micaela Vargas m. 1948-1955; Rosalia m. 1956-1973
- Children: 6, including Rosalía Valdés
- Relatives: Antonio Valdés (brother); Manuel Valdés (brother); Ramón Valdés (brother)
- Website: https://www.tintan.com.mx

Germán Genaro Cipriano Teodoro Gómez Valdés y Castillo (19 September 1915 – 29 June 1973), known as Tin-Tan, was a Mexican actor, comedian and singer, specialized in the musical genre of bolero.

He was born in Mexico City, but was raised and began his career in Ciudad Juarez, Chihuahua. He often displayed the pachuco dress and employed pachuco slang in many of his movies, some with his brothers, Ramón Valdés and Manuel "El Loco" Valdés. He made the language of the border Mexican, known in Spanish as fronterizos pachucos, famous in Mexico. A "caló" based in Spanglish, it was a mixture of Spanish and English in speech based on that of Mexicans on the Mexican side of the border, specifically Ciudad Juarez.

== Origin of name ==
Tin-Tan began his career by calling himself Topillo (slang for the trickster), which a friend of his stated sounded too vulgar and uncouth for a comedian. He suggested instead the nickname "Tin-Tan" (based on the sound of bells ringing), which Valdés originally disliked but grew to like and use professionally for his whole career.

== Career ==
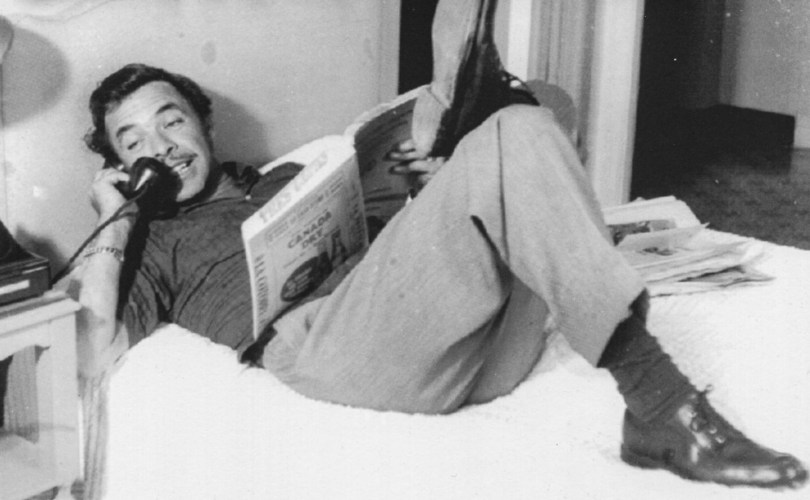
Valdés in 1953

Valdés's film career came as a complete surprise to everyone. He used to work as a sweeper for the XEJ station in Ciudad Juarez when he decided to try to mimic the radio announcers for fun. Unbeknownst to him, the actual announcer had left the microphone on. His quick wit and funny personality garnered him acclaim and he was quickly promoted to the main radio announcer himself. It was under these circumstances that legendary ventriloquist Paco Miller contacted him to act in films, and his career began.

He usually acted alongside his "carnal" (blood brother), Marcelo Chávez, who also accompanied Tin-Tan with a guitar. He was a prominent figure during his golden years in film, from 1949 onward. His 1948 film, Calabacitas tiernas, a comedy, was chosen as one of the best in Mexican cinema.

Valdés boasted of his record of "having kissed the most actresses" in his career, some of them considered the beauties of their day. His co-stars were Marga López, Rosita Quintana, Silvia Pinal, Amalia Aguilar, Meche Barba, Ana Bertha Lepe, María Antonieta Pons, Yolanda Montes "Tongolele" and many more. He also collaborated closely with actress and comedian Fannie Kauffman "Vitola", during their careers.

He was also one of several people who were originally intended to be on the front cover of The Beatles' Sgt. Pepper's Lonely Hearts Club Band but declined the invitation. He requested that Ringo swap him for a Mexican tree known as "El Árbol de la Vida", the Tree of Life, which he did.

He was the voice of Baloo the bear and Thomas O'Malley the cat in the Mexican Spanish dubbing of the Disney films The Jungle Book and The Aristocats; both roles were originally voiced by Phil Harris.

Valdés was the subject of the 2005 documentary, Ni Muy Muy... Ni Tan Tan... Simplemente Tin Tán, by Manuel Márquez and Carlos Valdés, son of the comedian.

== Death ==
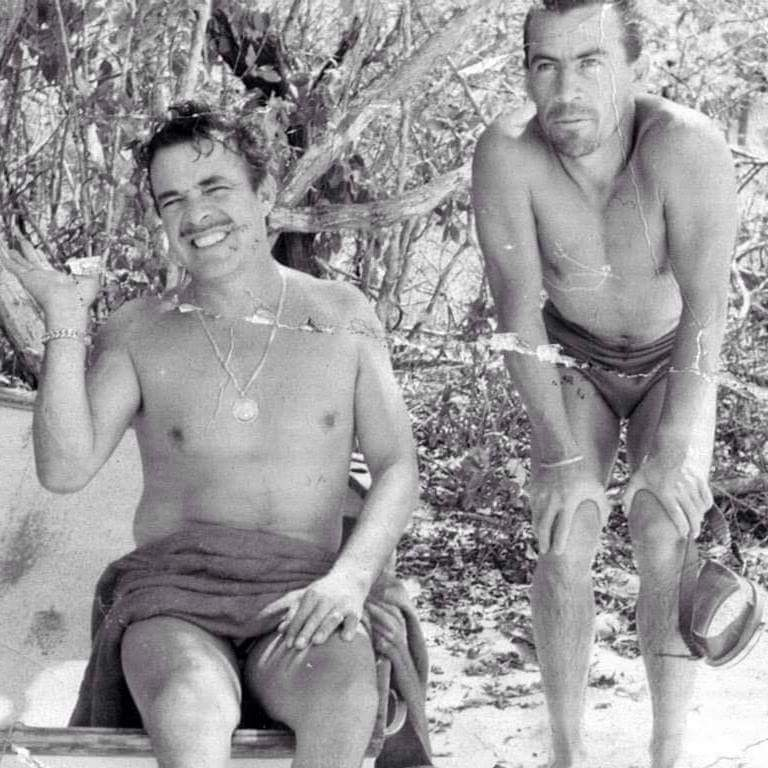
Valdés with his brother Antonio, c. 1960s

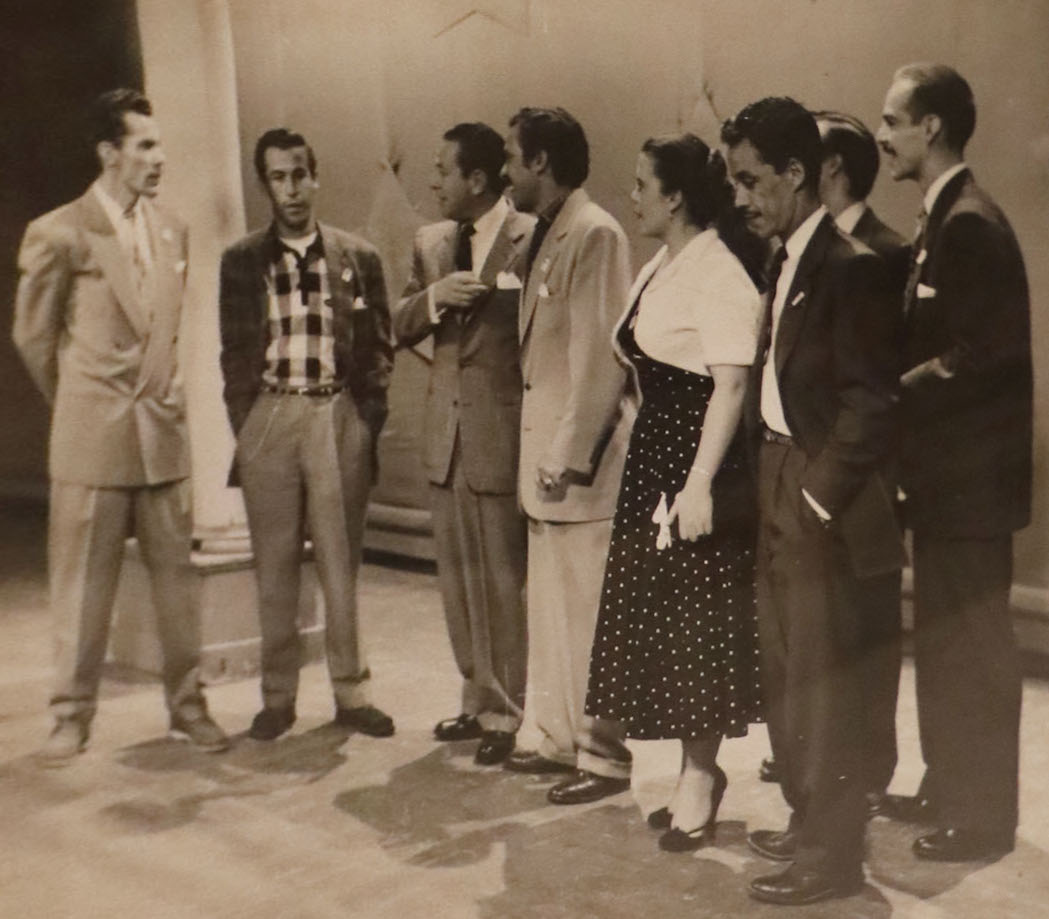
The Valdés brothers; Ramón (gray suit, first on the left), Antonio (plaid shirt), Germán (gray suit, center) and Manuel (black suit, last in the second row from the right) in 1958

Valdés became ill with hepatitis, which degenerated into cancer. He then fell into a hepatic coma and died on 29 June 1973 (at age 57). He's buried at Panteón Jardín in Mexico City.

When he died he did not leave a fortune, just a testament to his wife Rosalía and his children Rosalía and Carlos.

He left behind a legacy of over a hundred films, 11 records, and two short films. The only recognition he received was the Virginia Fábregas Medal, a medal given for 25 years' professional service by the Association of Actors of Mexico.

== Legacy ==
On 19 September 2019, the 104th anniversary of his birth, Tin-Tan was honored with a Google Doodle that reached Central America, Iceland, Italy and Sweden.

== Selected filmography ==
- El que la traga, la paga (1943) as La Chiva
- Summer Hotel (1944)
- The Disobedient Son (1945) as Tin-Tan
- Song of Mexico (1945) as Tin-Tan (uncredited)
- The Noiseless Dead (1946) as Tin-Tan / Inocente Santos
- Music Inside (1947) as Tin-Tan / Diego
- The Lost Child (1947) as Agustín / Tincito Peón Torre y Rey
- Music, Poetry and Madness (1948) as Tin-Tan
- Tender Pumpkins (1949) as Tin-Tan
- Rough But Respectable (1949) as Tin-Tan
- No me defiendas, compadre (1949) as Tin-Tan
- El rey del barrio (1950) as Tin-Tan
- The Mark of the Skunk (1950) as Tin / El vizconde Martín de Texmelucan
- También de dolor se canta (1950) as Tin-Tan
- Sinbad the Seasick (1950) as Simbad
- El revoltoso (1951) as Tin-Tan
- Oh Darling! Look What You've Done! (1951) as Tin-Tan
- Kill Me Because I'm Dying! (1951) as Tin-Tan
- When Women Rule (1951) as Tin-Tan
- Las locuras de Tin-Tan (1952) as Tin-Tan
- Snow White (1952) as Valentín Gaytán
- Chucho the Mended (1952) as Valentín Gaytán / Aniceto Ugartechea "Cheto"
- Mi campeón (1952) as Tin-Tan
- The Beautiful Dreamer (1952) as Trikitran
- You've Got Me By the Wing (1953) as Tin-Tan
- The Island of Women (1953) as Tin-Tan / Totí
- The Vagabond (1953) as La Chiva
- God Created Them (1953) as Tin-Tan
- The Unknown Mariachi (1953) as Agustín / Kiko Guanabacoa
- Reportaje (1953) as Tin-Tan, pachuco composer
- El vizconde de Montecristo (1954) as Inocencio Dantés / El vizconde de Montecristo
- El hombre inquieto (1954) as Germán Valdés / Abel Caim
- Bluebeard (1955) as Ricardo Martínez
- Look What Happened to Samson (1955) as Tin-Tan / Sansón
- Barefoot Sultan (1956) as Sultán Casquillo
- El vividor (1956) as Atliano Valadez
- El médico de las locas (1956) as Apolonio Borrego
- Teatro del crimen (1957) as Tin-Tan
- Las aventuras de Pito Pérez (1957) as Pito Pérez / Jesús Pérez Gaona
- El campeón ciclista (1957) as Cleto García
- Puss Without Boots (1957) as Agustín Tancredo "El Gato" / Don Victorio Tancredo
- Locos peligrosos (1957) as Federico
- Los tres mosqueteros y medio (1957) as D'Artagnan
- Escuela para suegras (1958) as Tin-Tan
- Refifi entre las mujeres (1958) as Refifí
- Viaje a la luna (1958) as Nicolás Pérez
- Quiero ser artista (1958) as Tin-Tan
- Música de siempre (1958) as Tin-Tan
- A Thousand and One Nights (1958) as Ben Akih / Selim / Yamaní /Nuredín Valdés
- La odalisca No. 13 (1958) as Quinquín
- ¡Paso a la juventud..! (1958) as Casimiro Rosado
- Tres lecciones de amor (1959) as Profesor Germán Valadez / Casanova / Nerón
- Vagabundo y millonario (1959) as Antonio García / Andrés Aguilar
- El cofre del pirata (1959) as Germán de las Altas Torres y Pérez
- Ferias de México (1959) as Tin-Tan
- El que con niños se acuesta (1959) as Chon / Encarnación Bernal de González y de la Martínez
- Dos fantasmas y una muchacha (1959) as Germán Pérez
- Escuela de verano (1959) as Casimiro Buenavista y Manduriano
- Vivir del cuento (1960) as Crisóforo Pérez "Chóforo"
- La casa del terror (1960) as Casimiro
- Variedades de medianoche (1960) as Germán Gómez "El Trompas"
- Rebel Without a House (1960) as Teodoro Silva
- La tijera de oro (1960) as Emilio Campos
- Tin-Tan y las modelos (1960) as Marcos Alonso Chimalpopoca
- Una estrella y dos estrellados (1960) as Tin-Tan
- El violetero (1960) as Lorenzo Miguel Arroyo "El Violetero"
- The Phantom of the Operetta (1960) as Aldo / Baldomiro Valdes
- El pandillero (1961) as Pepe Álvarez del Monte
- El duende y yo (1961) as Modesto Fauno
- Locura de terror (1961) as Pacífico Otero
- ¡Suicídate, mi amor! (1961) as Raúl González
- Viva Chihuahua (1961) as Germán Terrazas "El Chihuahua"
- Pilotos de la muerte (1962) as Octano Pérez y Pérez
- ¡En peligro de muerte! (1962) as Marshall Nylon
- El tesoro del rey Salomón (1963) as Tin-Tan
- Fuerte, audaz y valiente (1963)
- Tin-Tan el hombre mono (1963) as Tin-Tan
- Face of the Screaming Werewolf (1965) as Man Who Sleeps in Wax Museum and Saves Woman in Apartment
- Tintansón Crusoe (1965) as Tin-Tan Cruz / Guaraní
- Los fantasmas burlones (1965) as Cyril Ludovico Churchill
- Especialista en chamacas (1965) as Don Guille
- Puerto Rico en carnaval (1965)
- Loco por ellas (1966) as Ángel Macías / Alberto Macías / Padre de Ángel y Alberto
- El ángel y yo (1966) as Rito
- Detectives o ladrones (1967) as Harry
- Seis Días para Morir (La Rabia) (1967) as José
- Duelo en El Dorado (1969) as Compadre Barrera
- Gregorio y su ángel (1970) as Devil
- El capitán Mantarraya (1970) as Capitán Mantarraya
- Chanoc en las garras de las fieras (1970) as Tsekub Baloyán
- El quelite (1970) as Próculo
- Trampa para una niña (1971) as Merólico
- En estas camas nadie duerme (1971) as Salame
- El ogro (1971) as Sabas
- Caín, Abel y el otro (1971) as Óscar Latorre
- Chanoc contra el tigre y el vampiro (1972) as Tsekub Baloyán
- The Incredible Professor Zovek (1972) as Chalo
- Los cacos (1972) as El Muerto
- Chanoc contra las tarántulas (1973) as Tsekub Baloyán
- La Disputa (1974) as Lorenzo Rocadura
- Acapulco 12-22 (1975) as Pirata, limpiabotas
- La mafia amarilla (1975) as Germán
- Noche de muerte (1972) as Germán (final film role)
