= Chucho the Mended =

1952 film

- Directed by: Gilberto Martínez Solares
- Written by: Juan García; Gilberto Martínez Solares
- Produced by: Óscar J. Brooks; Ernesto Enríquez; Felipe Mier; Germán Valdés
- Starring: Germán Valdés; Alicia Caro; Perla Aguiar
- Cinematography: Ezequiel Carrasco
- Edited by: Carlos Savage
- Music by: Luis Hernández Bretón
- Production companies: Cinematográfica Valdés; Mier y Brooks
- Release date: 2 May 1952
- Running time: 85 minutes
- Country: Mexico
- Language: Spanish

Chucho the Mended (Spanish: Chucho el remendado) is a 1952 Mexican comedy film written and directed by Gilberto Martínez Solares, and starring Germán Valdés "Tin-Tan", Alicia Caro and Perla Aguiar. It is the sequel to the film of the same year, Snow White and a parody of Chucho el Roto.

== Plot ==
A thief known in criminal circles as Aniceto Ugartechea steals jewelry from guests at a gathering hosted by the married couple Valentín Gaytán, originally from an indigenous community in Chiapas, and Magdalena, an aristocrat who supports the household financially along with their son. It is later revealed that Valentín is behind this and other thefts, while also involved with a cabaret singer named Margot. When Valentín decides to turn his life around, Margot responds by taking a job as a maid in the household and giving him an ultimatum: he has 24 hours to divorce Magdalena or she will harm his wife and son.

== Cast ==
- Germán Valdés "Tin-Tan" as Valentín Gaytán
- Alicia Caro as Magdalena
- Perla Aguiar as Margot
- Marcelo Chávez as Marcelo
- Juan García as Detective
- Tito Novaro as Marcelito
- Magda Donato as Sirenia
- Queta Lavat as Beatriz
- Lucrecia Muñoz as Lupe, sirvienta
- Pedro de Aguillón as Horacio
- Bertha Lehar as Discipula de tango
- Georgina González as Amiga de Beatriz
- Raquel Muñoz as Secretaria
- Eduardo Alcaraz as Amante de Margot
- Enrique Zambrano as Complice de Tin
- Manuel Trejo Morales as Invitado a reunión
- Yolanda Montes as Bailarina

== Bibliography ==
- Sonny Richard Ernest Espinoza. Chicanismo in Film and Popular Culture: Betwixt and Between Cinematic and Institutional Borders. 2001.
