= Ramiro Gamboa =

Mexican actor and television actor (1917–1992)

- Born: Ramiro Gamboa Pérez; December 1, 1917; Mérida, Yucatán, Mexico
- Died: December 29, 1992 (aged 75); Polanco, Mexico City, Mexico
- Occupations: Television presenter and actor
- Years active: 1940s–1980s
- Employer: Televisa
- Known for: Tío Gamboín

Ramiro Gamboa Pérez (December 1, 1917 – December 29, 1992) was a Mexican radio and television announcer, and actor in film and television. He had an active career from the 1940s through the 1980s. He was best known as a television host for children's programming in which he was known by the stage name Tío Gamboín. He died of cancer in 1992 at the age of 75.

== Early life ==
Ramiro Gamboa Pérez was born on December 2, 1917, in Mérida, Yucatán. His father, Ramiro Gamboa Ponce, opened and was the general manager of XEME "La voz del Sureste", a prominent radio station in Yucatán.

== Career ==
Gamboa's first time performing was as an announcer on his father's radio station. He was the host of Quiero trabajar through XEQ for nine years in the 1940s.

Between the 1940s and 1970s, he was cast in several movies, such as Angelitos negros, Champion Without a Crown, The Noiseless Dead, Fly Away, Young Man! and Trip to the Moon. He played the part of the Conductor in the 1960 film Conquistador de la luna, an adaptation of Jules Verne's novel From the Earth to the Moon directed by Rogelio A. González. In the 1970s, he switched to television and performed as a secondary character in the Televicentro show Carrusel Musical.

He mentored and gave his first opportunities in TV to Mexican actor Chabelo. They appeared together in several movies and television shows. He also assisted the career of singer Amparo Montes, giving Montes her first professional opportunities to perform on the radio program Quiero trabajar.

=== As Tío Gamboín ===
In the 1970s and 1980s, he was the presenter for Televisa's cartoon programming Una tarde de tele ("An Afternoon of TV"), on Canal 5 on weekday afternoons. He wore a red jacket with patches of cartoon characters. During the show, he read fan letters and showcased a collection of toys and mechanical figurines, some famous in their own right, such as Pacholín and Salchichita, a small wind-up dachshund. Fans who joined Gamboín's club became his "nieces and nephews", which could ask for a live birthday message or song. Thus, Gamboín was known as their "uncle" or tío, earning him the name "Tío Gamboín". The show had a few emblematic songs. An invisible character was Corcolito, who watched the children and reported to him if they behaved badly. He ended the show each day by saying, "Don't let me down, nephews and nieces, don't let me down".

== Personal life ==
Ramiro Gamboa Pérez died from prostate cancer in his home in Polanco, Mexico City, on December 29, 1992. He was married and had children.
