= Óscar J. Brooks =

Mexican screenwriter and film producer (1914–1984)

- Born: 27 April 1914; Chihuahua, Chihuahua, Mexico
- Died: 8 June 1984 (aged 70); Cuernavaca, Morelos, Mexico
- Occupations: Producer, Writer
- Years active: 1947-1972 (film)

Óscar J. Brooks (1914–1984) was a Mexican screenwriter and film producer.

== Selected filmography ==
- The Golden Boat (1947)
- I Am a Charro of Rancho Grande (1947)
- Hypocrite (1949)
- The Woman of the Port (1949)
- Sinbad the Seasick (1950)
- The Chicken Hawk (1951)
- Women Without Tomorrow (1951)
- Oh Darling! Look What You've Done! (1951)
- In the Palm of Your Hand (1951)
- Chucho the Mended (1952)
- The Three Happy Compadres (1952)
- Hot Rhumba (1952)
- The Beautiful Dreamer (1952)
- Snow White (1952)
- The Night Falls (1952)
- The Three Happy Friends (1952)
- Made for Each Other (1953)
- The Unknown Mariachi (1953)
- The Vagabond (1953)
- My Three Merry Widows (1953)
- The Viscount of Monte Cristo (1954)
- Bluebeard (1955)
- Puss Without Boots (1957)
- The Phantom of the Operetta (1960)

== Bibliography ==
- Rogelio Agrasánchez. Guillermo Calles: A Biography of the Actor and Mexican Cinema Pioneer. McFarland, 2010.
