= Luis Hernández Bretón =

Mexican film composer

- Occupation: Composer
- Years active: 1935–1979 (film)

Luis Hernández Bretón was a Mexican film composer.

== Selected filmography ==
- The Lieutenant Nun (1944)
- Ecija's Seven Children (1947)
- The Secret of Juan Palomo (1947)
- Strange Appointment (1947)
- Hypocrite (1949)
- Oh Darling! Look What You've Done! (1951)
- Chucho the Mended (1952)
- Snow White (1952)
- The Strange Passenger (1953)
- Él (1953)
- Sonatas (1959)
- The White Sister (1960)
- La Tía Alejandra (1979)

== Bibliography ==
- Freddy Buache. Bunuel. L'AGE D'HOMME, 1980.
