= Gilberto Martínez Solares =

Mexican director, cinematographer, screenwriter and actor (1906–1997)

- Born: Mario Gilberto Agustin Martinez Solares; January 19, 1906; Mexico City, Mexico
- Died: January 18, 1997 (aged 90); Mexico City, Mexico
- Occupation: Director
- Known for: Five Faces of Woman; Mulata

Mario Gilberto Agustin Martinez Solares (January 19, 1906 – January 18, 1997) was a Mexican director, cinematographer, screenwriter, and actor who is considered one of the most prolific filmmakers in Mexican cinema having directed more than 160 films, most of them written by him during the Golden Age of Mexican cinema. He is also recognized as the most important comedy director in Mexico.

== Life and career ==
Gilberto Martínez Solares was born on January 19, 1906, in Mexico City. His father, Gilberto Martínez Medina, was an accountant that worked for the Madero government. In 1910, the Mexican Revolution broke out, and, as a result of the expanding violent environment in Mexico City, the Martínez-Solares family moved near Pénjamo, Guanajuato to the Hacienda de la Calle in 1913. Upon the family's return to Mexico City, Gilberto Martínez attended the Fray Bartolomé de las Casas primary school, where he shared the classroom and the hours of play with two future colleagues; Gabriel Figueroa and Alejandro Galindo with whom he maintained a close, friendly and professional relationship throughout his life. Between 1919 and 1924 he continued his secondary and preparatory studies at the San Ildefonso College. There, he was classmates with Renato Leduc, Salvador Novo and Xavier Villaurrutia, important Mexican writers associated to the Mexican film industry. In the beginning, Gilberto Martínez's interests were oriented to the study of law, but a health problem forced him to leave the university and travel to Los Angeles to treat a heart problem. Later, he began a career in law that was interrupted due to an erroneous medical diagnosis about the condition of his heart, for which, he moved to Los Angeles to undergo treatment. Upon his return to Mexico City in 1929, he established a photographic studio in partnership with his brother Raúl Martínez Solares and friend Gabriel Figueroa, located on Avenida Hidalgo, but did not have good results due to their inexperience. After the first failure, they established another studio located in Madero Street that was very successful, as it became the best studio, according to Figueroa.

In 1930, his inclination to cinema led him to Hollywood, where he installed another studio and where he held the opportunity to photograph some of the greatest actors and actresses of the time. There, he also met several of his future colleagues such as René Cardona, Emilio Fernández, Chano Urueta, director Antonio Moreno, and cinematographer Alex Phillips who, once back in Mexico, invited him to work as a stillman in 1931. After his stay in the United States, he returned to Mexico to marry Diana Garza Cantú, daughter of the writer María Luisa Garza, novelist of the time and founder of the Mexican Institute for Child Protection. The couple went to live in Paris, where Gilberto placed another photographic studio. During his time in Europe, he met Pablo Picasso and the Japanese painter Tsuguharu Foujita. After a year living in the capital, Martínez Solares learned of the formal beginning of the Mexican film industry with the production of Santa, directed by Antonio Moreno, and decided to return to Mexico. In 1935, director Miguel Zacarías, through a cooperative, allowed the brothers Gilberto and Raúl Martínez Solares to make their debut as cinematographers in the film Rosario with Pedro Armendáriz and Gloria Morel. After several credits as a cinematographer and as a screenwriter, he began his career as a director in 1938 with the film El Señor Mayor, starring Domingo Soler. From then on, his films successfully journeyed the most diverse genres, but always showed a predilection for comedy, farce, absurdity, and caricature. Some of his well-known films are Tender Pumpkins (1949) and The King of the Neighborhood (1950) that popularized the comedian Germán Valdés (Tin Tan). In 1978, Gilberto Martínez Solares formed, collectively with Adolfo Martínez Solares, his son, Santos and Alejandro Soberón, the production company Frontera Films, of which he was president. In 1994, during the Ariel Awards, he received a special award recognition from the Mexican Academy of Film Arts and Sciences for his cinematographic and directorial career. He died on January 18, 1997, at the age of 90, due to cardiac arrest.

== Selected filmography ==
- Beautiful Mexico (1938)
- I Danced with Don Porfirio (1942)
- Resurrection (1943)
- Tragic Wedding (1946) (director only)
- Five Faces of Woman (1947)
- Strange Appointment (1947)
- The Newlywed Wants a House (1948)
- Tender Pumpkins (1949)
- Rough But Respectable (1949)
- The Perez Family (1949)
- The Mark of the Fox (1950)
- Sinbad the Seasick (1950)
- Oh Darling! Look What You've Done! (1951)
- Chucho the Mended (1952)
- Hot Rhumba (1952)
- Snow White (1952)
- The Beautiful Dreamer (1952)
- You've Got Me By the Wing (1953)
- The Unknown Mariachi (1953)
- The Vagabond (1953)
- Look What Happened to Samson (1955)
- Bluebeard (1955)
- Barefoot Sultan (1956)
- Alma llanera (1965)
- Satanico pandemonium (1975)
