= Marcelo Chávez (actor) =

Mexican actor (1911–1970)

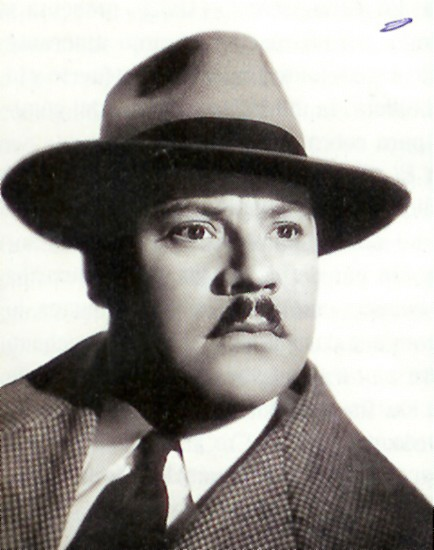
- Born: 13 March 1911; Tampico Alto, Veracruz, Mexico
- Died: 14 February 1970 (aged 58); Mexico City, Mexico
- Other name: Marcelo Chávez Herrera
- Occupation: Actor
- Years active: 1943–1970 (film)

Marcelo Chávez (13 March 1911 – 14 February 1970) was a Mexican film actor. He mainly known for her work in comedy films in the 1940s, 1950s and 1960s, frequently appearing alongside comedian Germán Valdés «Tin-Tan».

== Selected filmography ==
- Summer Hotel (1944)
- The Disobedient Son (1945)
- The Noiseless Dead (1946)
- Music Inside (1947)
- The Lost Child (1947)
- Music, Poetry and Madness (1948)
- Rough But Respectable (1949)
- Tender Pumpkins (1949)
- The King of the Neighborhood (1950)
- The Mark of the Fox (1950)
- Sinbad the Seasick (1950)
- Oh Darling! Look What You've Done! (1951)
- When Women Rule (1951)
- Kill Me Because I'm Dying! (1951)
- The Beautiful Dreamer (1952)
- Snow White (1952)
- Chucho the Mended (1952)
- You've Got Me By the Wing (1953)
- The Island of Women (1953)
- The Unknown Mariachi (1953)
- The Vagabond (1953)
- The Viscount of Monte Cristo (1954)
- Look What Happened to Samson (1955)
- Bluebeard (1955)
- Barefoot Sultan (1956)
- Puss Without Boots (1957)
- The Phantom of the Operetta (1960)
- Rebel Without a House (1960)

== Bibliography ==
- Scott L. Baugh. Latino American Cinema: An Encyclopedia of Movies, Stars, Concepts, and Trends: An Encyclopedia of Movies, Stars, Concepts, and Trends. ABC-CLIO, 2012.
