= David Negrete Fernández =

- Spouse: Emilia Moreno Anaya (died 1953)
- Children: Consuelo Negrete Moreno; Jorge Negrete Moreno; Emilia Negrete Moreno; Teresa Negrete Moreno; David Negrete Moreno; Rubén Negrete Moreno

David Negrete Fernández (Spanish pronunciation: [daˈβið neˈɣɾete feɾˈnandes]) was a Mexican colonel who participated in the Mexican Revolution. He was also a musician.

== Biography ==
David fought alongside military officer Felipe Ángeles as a part of División del Norte.

He married Emilia Moreno Anaya, who bore him:

- Consuelo Negrete Moreno
- Jorge Alberto Negrete Moreno
- Emilia Negrete Moreno
- Teresa Negrete Moreno
- David Negrete Moreno
- Rubén Negrete Moreno

David was a math teacher in Mexico City. He was also a father-in-law of Elisa Christy and María Félix.

== See also ==
- Enrique Álvarez Félix, David's step-grandson
- Miguel Negrete, relative of David Negrete
