= Traces of the Past =

1950 film

- Directed by: Alfredo B. Crevenna
- Screenplay by: Edmundo Báez; Egon Eis
- Story by: Raquel Alcoriza; Luis Alcoriza; Edmundo Báez
- Produced by: Óscar Dancigers
- Starring: Libertad Lamarque; Emilia Guiú; José María Linares-Rivas; Xavier Loyá
- Cinematography: José Ortiz Ramos
- Edited by: Carlos Savage
- Music by: Manuel Esperón
- Production company: Ultramar Films
- Release date: 1 November 1950 (Mexico)
- Running time: 98 minutes
- Country: Mexico
- Language: Spanish

Traces of the Past (Spanish: Huellas del pasado) is a 1950 Mexican drama film directed by Alfredo B. Crevenna and starring Libertad Lamarque, alongside Emilia Guiú, José María Linares-Rivas and Xavier Loyá. It was shot at the Tepeyac Studios in Mexico City. The film's sets were designed by the art director Edward Fitzgerald. The film is considered one of Lamarque's "mother melodramas" that she made in Mexico.

== Plot ==
Isabel (Libertad Lamarque) is a woman who left behind her career as a singer to marry lawyer Federico Montero (José María Linares-Rivas). Isabel's past as a singer torments Federico, who finds it immoral, and after an incident following Isabel's chance encounter with a former boyfriend, he leaves her, taking their son Raúl away from her. Years pass, and Isabel, who in the meantime reassumed her career as a singer as "Issa Valetti", upon learning of Federico's death, goes searching for Raúl. She eventually finds the now grown up Raúl (Xavier Loyá), who now has become a hard-drinking man who hates his mother despite having no memory of her, and is in a relationship with Amanda (Emilia Guiú), a gold-digger. With Raúl unaware about the relationship he has with Isabel (only knowing her as famous singer Issa Valetti), Isabel tries to change his mind about his mother, but to her dismay, she finds out that Raúl has fallen in love with her "Issa Valetti" persona.

== Cast ==
- Libertad Lamarque as Isabel / Issa Valetti
- Emilia Guiú as Amanda
- José María Linares-Rivas as Federico Montero
- Xavier Loyá as Adult Raúl
- Francisco Jambrina as Marcos
- José Pidal as Vázquez, impresario
- Alejandro Ciangherotti as Antonio Quintero
- María Gentil Arcos as Lupe, nanny
- Amparo Arozamena as Pepita
- Meneses y Francioli
- Victorio Blanco as Theater man (uncredited)
- Gloria Cansino as Theater employee (uncredited)
- Elisa Christy as Gloria (uncredited)
- Álvaro Matute as Theater employee (uncredited)
- Roberto Meyer as Police Commissioner (uncredited)
- Nicolás Rodríguez Jr. as Child Raúl (uncredited)
- Rafael Torres as Carlo (uncredited)
- Acela Vidaurri as Theater employee (uncredited)
