= Rita Montaner =

Cuban singer, pianist and actress (1900–1958)

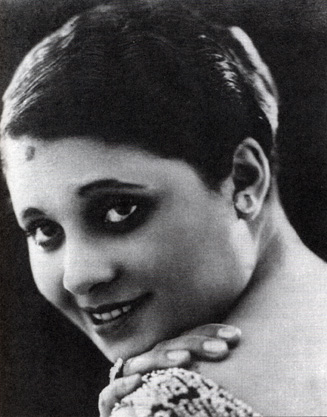
- Rita Montaner

Background information
- Also known as: Rita de Cuba
- Born: Rita Aurelia Fulcida Montaner y Facenda; 20 August 1900; Guanabacoa, Cuba
- Died: 17 April 1958 (aged 57) Havana, Cuba
- Genres: Rhumba, zarzuela
- Occupations: Musician, actress
- Instruments: Vocals, piano
- Years active: 1920–1958
- Label: Puchito
- Spouses: Alberto Fernández Díaz (died 1932); Ernesto Estévez Navarro (m. 1933; div. 1938); Javier Calderón Poveda (m. 1939; div. 1958)

Rita Aurelia Fulcida Montaner y Facenda (20 August 1900 – 17 April 1958), known as Rita Montaner, was a Cuban singer, pianist and actress. In Cuban parlance, she was a vedette (a star), and was well known in Mexico City, Paris, Miami and New York, where she performed, filmed and recorded on numerous occasions. She was one of Cuba's most popular artists between the late 1920s and 1950s, renowned as Rita de Cuba. Though classically trained as a soprano for zarzuelas, her mark was made as a singer of Afro-Cuban salon songs including "The Peanut Vendor" and "Siboney".

Throughout her career, Montaner kept a close personal and professional relationship with two famous musicians from her hometown of Guanabacoa: pianist-singer Bola de Nieve and composer Ernesto Lecuona.

== Life ==
Montaner was born on 20 August 1900 in Guanabacoa, Havana, into a middle-class family. Her father, Domingo Montaner Pulgarón, was a pharmacist and her mother was Mercedes Facenda; she herself was short in stature, good-looking with a fine smile, and intelligent. She learned English, Italian and French at religious school, and at 10 attended the Peyrellade Conservatory in Havana. There she studied music: solfege, theory, harmony and piano; at 16 she started voice lessons. From the start, she was a potential star: her first press notice came in 1912, her first press photograph in 1913, and in 1915 she received two bronze medals for piano. In 1917, Montaner played Mendelssohn in her final examination at the Peyrellade Conservatory in Havana; she graduated in piano, song and harmony with a gold medal.

Rita Montaner married lawyer Dr. Alberto Fernández Díaz. They had two sons, Rolando and Alberto. The marriage lasted until his death in 1932, and she remarried twice. She died of cancer in 1958, aged 57.

== Career ==
=== Early years ===
March 1922 saw the launch of Montaner's career at a concert of typical Cuban music in Havana, organized by the composer Eduardo Sánchez de Fuentes, a friend of her family. He persuaded her husband to let her appear and sing. In October 1922, she sang on one of the first radio broadcasts in Cuba at the PWX radio station.

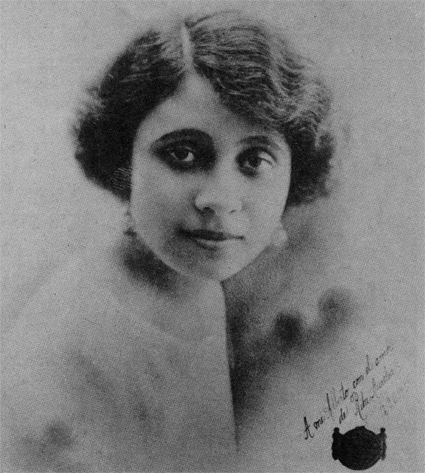
Rita Montaner in 1923

In 1923, she had a full professional program of work. She sang duos with Eusebio Delfín, and as a solo, pieces by Alberto Villalón, Ernesto Lecuona, Sánchez de Fuentes and others. She sang a duet from La Gioconda by Ponchielli with Lola de la Torre, a soprano, and sang solo on other pieces.

She performed with maestros such as Lecuona, Jorge Anckermann, Delfín, Sánchez de Fuentes and Gonzalo Roig and was successful and respectable, as befitted a middle-class married woman of those times. Gradually, however, a change began. She performed in popular, but slightly "vulgar" theater (zarzuela; bufo); traveled to other countries and became a recording artist. It became clear that performing in public was the most important thing in her life, and this was hardly compatible with her role as a bourgeois wife and mother. The first signs of change came in 1926.

In 1926, she sang on stage to Lecuona's piano in his 7th Concert of Cuban music at the Teatro Nacional. On vacation in New York she needed an appendix operation; after recovering she performed at a benefit concert for the blind. Then she auditioned for the Schubert brothers, impresarios, who offered her a contract while her husband returned to Cuba. She made her debut in the Schubert Follies together with Xavier Cugat at the Apollo Theater. Later she had a great hit with a review entitled A night in Spain.

Back in Havana, she made her debut on stage in zarzuelas in 1927. Playing in La Niña Rita, o La Habana de 1830 (music by Eliseo Grenet and Lecuona) she sang the Congo-tango Mamá Inés. The title role was played by Caridad Suarez, with Rita in blackface and male drag as El Calesero (the coachman). The second one-act work on the same program was the premiere of Lecuona's La tierra de Venus, where Rita sang "Siboney", which is still a Latin standard.

=== Rise to fame ===
From 1927-29, Montaner recorded about fifty songs for Columbia Records, including hits from the revues and zarzuelas she appeared in, such as "Ay, Mama Inés", "Siboney", "Noche azul", "Lamento esclavo", and the first recording of "El manisero". She went to Paris for the first time, performing at the Olympia and Le Palace theaters. Still in Paris, she appeared in Josephine Baker's Revue. According to Gonzalo Roig, she began to change, becoming more bohemian, something of a diva, and generally more competitive and combative. In November 1928, she returned to Havana.

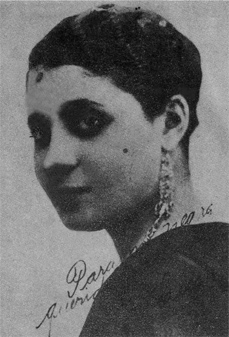
Rita in 1929

In 1929, Montaner traveled to Madrid and Valencia, then to Paris, returning to Cuba in 1930. In 1931, she traveled to Broadway under contract to Al Jolson for his musical Wonder Bar, which was set in a Paris night-club, for which she was by now more than qualified. When she was in Cuba, Rita had a regular engagement at the Edén Concert, a nightclub right in the center of Havana (Zulueta Street, near the Parque Central). Armando Romeo, later orchestra leader at the Tropicana, gave an interview later in life:

"There we would be, with Rita singing:
Mejor que me calle, que no diga mas, que tu sabes lo que yo se!
(Better I shut up and say no more, since you know what I know!)
—while outside the cabaret walls you could hear shooting in the streets."

In 1933, she went to Mexico City, with Bola de Nieve as her accompanist. She put him on the bill under his nickname, without consulting him. "It was the greatest favor she did in my life!" was Snowball's perhaps ambiguous comment. Bola was already of the opinion that she was becoming unbearable. "Rita's shows at the Teatro Iris were triumphant, but her mouth got the better of her"

On 1 April 1933, she married Ernesto Estévez Navarro. He was born in Cárdenas, Cuba, but had been deported to México. They divorced in 1938. Montaner next organized a smaller company with Pedro Vargas, whom she injudiciously paid in advance. In El Paso, Texas, Vargas denounced her as an enemy of Mexico, hoping to prevent her return to his country. "Rita tore into him, and told him he was a priests' faggot (and many other things!)" Bola said later in life when interviewed about her. Rita, furious, left the company, and Bola found himself looking at a third-class ticket to Mexico City.

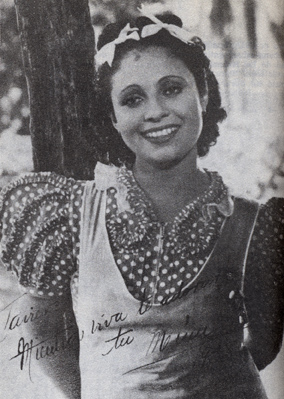
Rita Montaner in 1938 during the shooting of El romance del palmar.

The arrival of sound in films had created new opportunities for musicians, and Montaner launched on a new career as a film performer. After a musical number in a 1934 film, she made two films in 1938. Radio, too, was developing as a mass medium which was wide open to musical talent. La Montaner was to make good use of both these opportunities. But by now her temperament was getting out of control. Gonzalo Roig detailed the story of her sacking from the Lecuona show, María la O, at the Teatro Martí. During a duet with the tenor about the rekindling of betrayed love, she began to tear his clothes off on stage! That was a step too far for the management.

She divorced Ernesto Estévez in 1938, and married in 1939, for the third time, to the advocate Dr Javier Calderón Poveda.

=== Radio days ===
In 1942, RHC-Azul gave her a program Yo no sé nada (I don't know anything!) to do the character La Chismosa again, and once more the government (Fulgencio Batista's first term) applied pressure to have it taken off the air. Much later, in 1946, she had a third chance. CMQ gave her a program Mejor que me calle (Better I shut up! – a line from one of her songs) in which her street character, Lengualisa, had a side-kick Mojito (Alejandro Lugo). When the government (Ramón Grau's second term) tried to bribe her, she talked about it on the program. But, on the day of the first anniversary of the program, her brother (a policeman) was killed in a drive-by shooting. It surprised no-one that the culprits were never found. The program continued until February 1948.

Montaner often helped people in need. The famous Tropicana cabaret opened in Marianao, Havana, in late 1939. Choreographer Rodrigo Neira, a former dancer who had contracted leprosy became disfigured, poor and socially isolated. She intervened to save him from the leprosarium, supported his family and gave him accommodation in her house. She also helped Chano Pozo before his career took off, getting him a job at the radio company RHC-Cadena Azul as a door-man and bodyguard. There he sang and played conga in his spare time; he was first hired as a musician by the Havana Casino orchestra.

=== Night clubs ===
In 1939 the Tropicana theater and restaurant opened in Marianao. After closing temporarily when tourism declined during wartime; the Tropicana re-opened in 1945, along with other night-clubs such as the Sans Souci, the Montmartre, and their competition, the Gran Casino Nacional.

In 1946, Montaner signed with the Tropicana, with Bola de Nieve as accompanist, to take part in the midnight spectacular. She reigned there as the number one figure for nearly four years: the longest-running contract of her career. Mongo Santamaría commented: "This launched the era of the Cuban cabaret super-productions".

=== Acting career in the 1950s ===
Montaner continued to do theater work whenever her radio show was off the air. In 1955 she triumphed as Madame Flora in the opera La Medium by Menotti, and in 1956 in the comedy Mi querido Charles. Beginning in 1954, she co-starred in the comedy television program Rita y Willy with Guillermo Alvarez Guedes. In the late 1940s and early 1950s, she acted in numerous Mexican movies of the Rumberas genre.

== Popular musical theatre ==
=== 1920s ===
- 1922
  - Sang in concerts of typical Cuban music and song.
  - Inauguration of Cuban radio PWX as a singer.
- 1923
  - Festival of Cuban song.
  - Sings selected opera pieces at the Sala Falcón, Havana.
  - First concert of sacred music: sings selection from Stabat Mater of Rossini, as contralto.
  - Festival de la danza: plays Cervantes, Saumell and Lecuona.
- 1924
  - Concert Society, Teatro Campoamor: several singing engagements.
- 1925
  - Sings Cuban lyrical music at various theatres in Havana.
  - Worked as Lecuona's assistant organising concert.
- 1926
  - Schubert Follies Apollo, New York
- 1927
  - Zarzuela La Niña Rita, o La Habana de 1830 Teatro Lírico Nacional
  - Review La tierra de Venus Teatro Lírico Nacional
  - Variety Arabescos Teatro Regina
  - Review Es mucha Habana Teatro Regina
  - La revista femenina Teatro Regina
  - Review Bohemia Teatro Regina (imitates Josephine Baker for the first time)
  - Operetta La corte del faraón Teatro Regina
  - Review La liga de las señoras Teatro Regina
  - Zarzuela El asombro de Damasco Teatro Regina
  - Lyric comedy Mi pequeñao maldito Teatro Regina
  - Review Castells y Riancho Teatro Regina

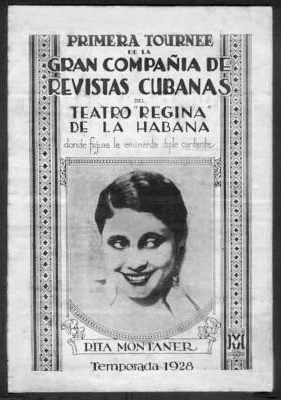

- 1928
  - Operetta El conde de Luxemburgo Teatro Regina
  - Fantasy review Los siete pecados capitales Teatro Regina
  - Lyric comedy Como las golondrinas Teatro Regina
  - Review Las musas latinas Teatro Regina
  - Review La tierra de Venus Teatro Regina (part); and songs
  - 10-week tour of Cuba by Teatro Regina
  - Homage to Julita Alonso, Teatro Actualidades.
  - Review Cuban Petit Follies Teatro Actualidades.
  - Reopening of the Rialto cinema; is presented as La reina de la canción cubana and as La mejor intérprete de la música folklórica.
  - Reopening of Fausto theatre; appears for one week.
  - Evening of homage to bid Rita farewell, at Teatro Prado. She sings various numbers in a 'contest' with tenor Rodolfo Hoyos.
  - Voyage to Paris: three months at the Palais de Paris, with Sindo Garay and his son Guarionex, a timbalero, and pianist Rafaelito Betancourt. Sings Cuban and Afro-Cuban material.
  - First appearance after her triumph in Paris: sings at the Teatro Encanto.
  - Goes to N.Y. to record 26 numbers for Columbia Records.
  - Death of her mother in a car accident.
- 1929
  - Reappears in Havana at the Cine Florencia and Teatro Peyret.
  - Tours Cuba in February.
  - Evening of homage to Rita, where she sings songs dedicated to her by leading composers (Lecuona, Roig, Anckermann, Caignet, Grenet, Simons) accompanied in each case by the song's author.
  - Has a huge hit with Simons' Chivo que rompé tambo; records it for Columbia.
  - June: leaves for Europe again; appears in Valencia, and in Madrid before the Queen and her council of ministers.

=== 1930s ===
- 1930
  - Appears in Paris, three months in England, then New York for more recordings.
  - Back to Cuba in June: appears in Cárdenas.
- 1931
  - Performs in New York as the main artist in Al Jolson's company in Wonder Bar. Tours U.S. for a year.
  - Records for Columbia.
- 1932
  - February: Husband Alberto Fernández Díaz dies; she leaves Jolson company and returns to Cuba.
  - July: appears with a galaxy of stars to celebrate her friend José Mojica at the Teatro Nacional.
- 1933
  - Goes to Mexico, and performs with Bola de Nieve: a huge success.
  - Marries Ernesto Estévez. Agustín Lara performs in homage to her "por su arte exceptional".
  - Makes her first film in Mexico La noche del pecado.
- 1934
  - June: appears in the review La tentación del trópico in Buenos Aires. Causes a sensation.
  - October: returns to Cuba.
- 1935
  - Performs on radio. Gets interested in the poetry of Nicolas Guillén.
  - February: Performs a whole series of AfroCuban numbers on stage at the Teatro Principal de la Comedia.
  - March: Sings the zarzuela (by Gonzalo Roig) Cecilia Valdés. Appears in the review La gran caimán (Robreño and Prats).
  - April: Appears in the lyric comedy La risa en el alma. Sings the zarzuela Rosa la China (Gallarraga/Lecuona). Performs in the dramatic zarzuela El proceso de Dolores. Appears in the entremés (short comedy) El secuestro de Falla.
  - May: Performs in the review Perlas (music by Roig). Sings lied El lamento negroide (Roig).
  - June: Appears in the reviews Mosaicos, El tren aéreo, Los maculados.
  - July: Appears in the lyric comedy Salomé, the reviews Vivan las cadenas and Contra la república del crimen, and the two-act Cuban rapsody La hija del sol (music by Roig).
  - August: Sings the sainete (short lyric comedy) María la O (lyrics by Sánchez Galarraga, music by Lecuona).
  - November: Homage to Rita at the Teatro Principal del Comedia. Plays piano duet with Lecuona in the premiere of his piece Como baila el muñeco. Takes part in the dialogue Las chismosas (The Gossips) with other celebrities. Sings the operetta, La duquesma del bar Tabarín by Carlo Lombardo.
  - December: Performs in the operetta La viuda alegre (Merry Widow) by Franz Lehár. Performs in the Fiesta de la Variedad with Bola de Nieve, Esther Borja, and others.
- 1936
  - January: Sings the part of Rosa, in the Spanish lyric sainete Los claveles; in the second part sings and acted Rosa la China (Galarraga/Lecuona). Sings the opera Lola Cruz (Galarraga/Lecuona).
  - February: visits New York to record for Columbia Records.
  - March–June: Teatro Alkázar, concerts of music by Cuban composers.
  - July: Sings Cuban numbers on Radio COCO and CMBZ. Sings at tango festival.
  - October: Sings sons and boleros with the Trio Matamoros.
- 1937
  - January: Sings zarzuela La reina mora, and Lecuona's El cafetal at Teatro Martí. Plays Cervantes in duo with María Cervantes at Teatro Alkázar.
  - February: Sings zarzuela María Belén Chacón by Rodrigo Prats. Sings at concert of AfroCuban music by Gilberto Valdés.
  - April: visits New York for recording session with Columbia Records. Plays the review Azul by Lecuona; in the second half sings part of El cafetal (Lecuona), part of the opera Lola Cruz, and part of La tierra de Venus (Lecuona). Also performed in the lyric comedy Sor Inés.
  - August: Sings the zarzuela Los gavilanes with Spanish baritone Augusto Ordóñez. Performs in Music Hall Review.
- 1938
  - First Cuban film Sucedió en La Habana.
  - Second Cuban film El romance del palmar.
  - Appearances as singer at various theatres in Havana.
  - Divorces Ernesto Estévez Navarro.
  - Appears again in María la O (Galarraga/Lecuona).

== Filmography ==
These are the films Rita appeared in as actress or singer-pianist or both.

- 1934 La noche del pecado as Rita Montaner y su Conjunto Tropical. (Mexican).
- 1938 Sucedió en La Habana
- 1938 El romance del palmar
- 1947 María la O (co-production Cuba/Mexico)
- 1948 Los angelitos negros (Mexican)
- 1950 Ritmos del Caribe (Mexican)
- 1950 Pobre corazón
- 1950 Anacleto se divorcia
- 1951 Víctimas del Pecado (Mexican)
- 1951 Al son del mambo (Mexican)
- 1951 Negro es mi color (Mexican)
- 1952 La renegada
- 1952 The Only One (1952)
- 1954 Píntame angelitos blanco
- 1980 Rita. Director: Oscar Valdés, 19 minutes. Short film biography of Rita Montaner.

== Montaner in popular culture ==
- Cuban writer Daína Chaviano paid tribute to Rita Montaner in her novel The Island of Eternal Love, where the actress appears as one of the main characters.
- The character Rita in the 2010 film Chico and Rita was based loosely on her.
