= The Last Round =

The Last Round may refer to:

- The Last Round (1953 film), a Mexican sports drama film
- The Last Round (1976 film), an Italian crime film
- The Last Round: Chuvalo vs. Ali, a 2003 Canadian documentary film

== See also ==
- Last Round, an album by the Holy Modal Rounders
