= Amalia Aguilar =

Cuban-born Mexican dancer (1924–2021)

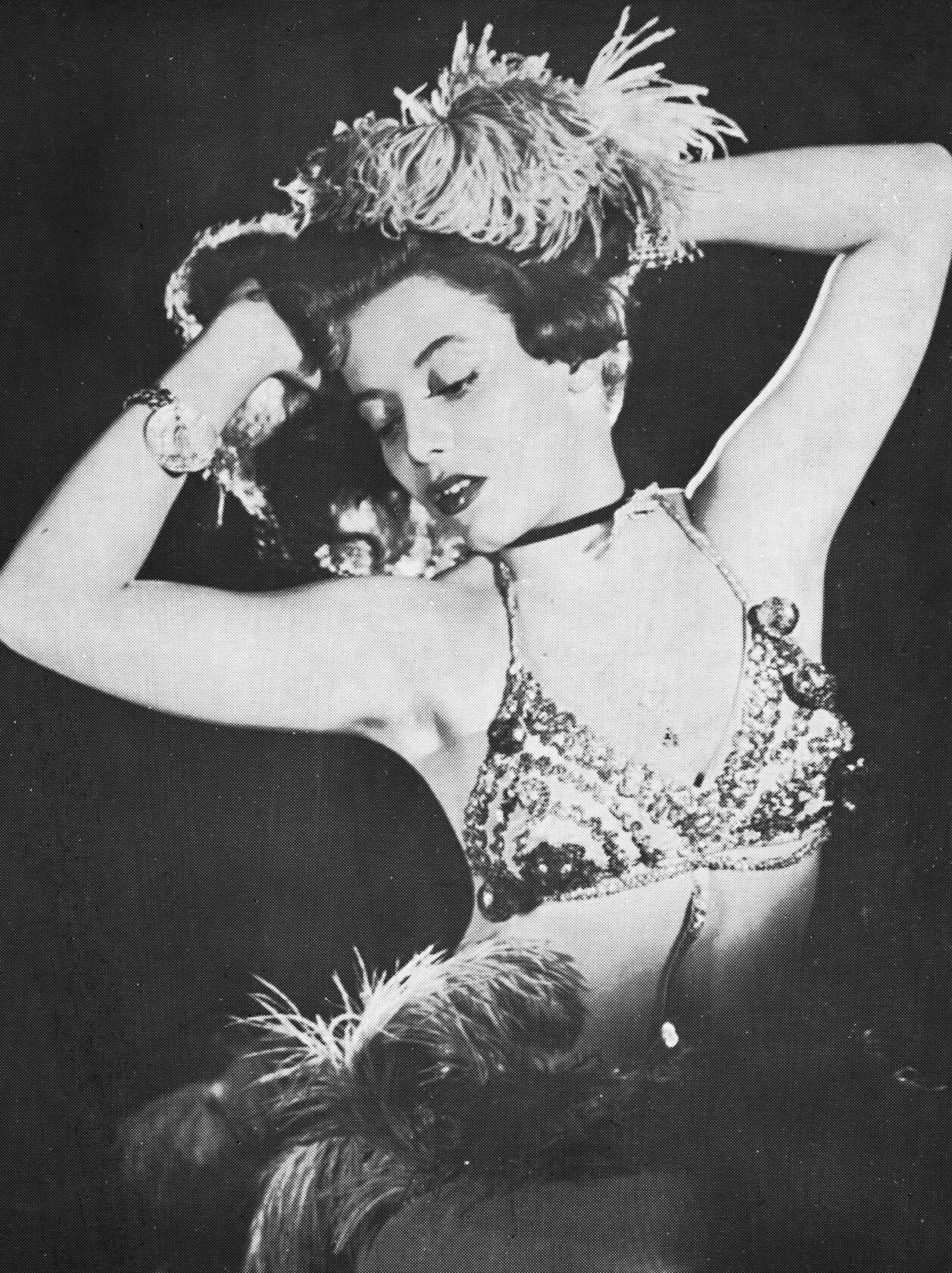
- Aguilar in 1954
- Born: Amalia Isabel Rodríguez Carriera; 3 July 1924; Matanzas, Cuba
- Died: 8 November 2021 (aged 97); Mexico City, Mexico
- Burial place: Panteón Jardín, Mexico City
- Occupations: Actress, dancer and singer
- Years active: 1946–2003
- Spouse: Raúl Beraún (1956–1962)

Amalia Isabel Rodríguez Carriera (3 July 1924 – 8 November 2021), known professionally as Amalia Aguilar, was a Cuban-Mexican dancer, actress and comedian.

== Early life ==
Amalia Isabel Rodríguez Carriera was born in Matanzas, Cuba. She and her sister Cecilia were stimulated artistically by their parents from their childhood. She studied ballet in Havana, with teachers like Lita Enhart, Lalo Maura and Jorge Harrison. She began her career next to her sister Cecilia. They were called "The Aguilar Sisters". The two girls were part of the Cuban Theatre Company. In Havana, the Aguilar Sisters met the famous Cuban dancer Julio Richard, who was looking for young dancers for his ballet. Initially, Amalia was rejected by Richard due to her inexperience. After some years, Cecilia got married when they were on a tour in Panama. Julio Richard noticed Amalia again and decided to take her to Mexico as a dance partner.

== Career ==
In Mexico, Aguilar debuted at the Theatre Lírico and the main cabarets of Mexico City, as well as in the XEW radio program La Hora Mejoral, with Carlos Amador. In the same year, she filmed her first movie Pervertida, with Ramon Armengod and Emilia Guiú. Her success and fame soon drew the attention of the United States. The Hollywood producers take her to act in some of the major nightclubs in the country.

During her stay in the United States, she worked alongside stars like Bob Hope, Carmen Miranda, Xavier Cugat and The Lecuona Cuban Boys. In Hollywood, she filmed the movie A Night at the Follies (1947), with Evelyn West. In Hollywood, the producers intended for Amalia to star in a film about the life of Lupe Vélez, but Amalia refused to work in the Hollywood industry and decided to return to Mexico.

Back in Mexico, Aguilar headed a group of musicians called Los Diablos del Trópico, and rejoined the Mexican cinema in 1948 with the film Conozco a los dos. She worked with Pedro Infante in Dícen que soy mujeriego, and with Germán "Tin Tan" Valdés in Calabacitas tiernas. Unlike her other colleagues rumberas, Amalia rarely performed in dramas. She preferred to play exhilarating characters in comedies.

Aguilar filmed 23 movies in just 10 years alongside figures such as Buster Keaton (El colmillo de Buda, 1949), Sara García (Novia a la medida, 1949), Rita Montaner (Ritmos del Caribe, 1950), Adalberto Martínez "Resortes" (Al son del mambo, 1950), Prudencia Grifell (Los huéspedes de la Marquesa, 1950), Elvira Quintana (Las viudas del Cha Cha Cha, 1955) and Evangelina Elizondo (Los platillos voladores, 1956), among others.

Her most remembered dramatic character is in the film Amor perdido (1951), alongside Víctor Junco. Special mention should be given to her roles in Las tres alegres comadres, Las interesadas (1952), My Three Merry Widows and Las cariñosasa (1953), where she performed with Lilia del Valle, Lilia Prado (in the first two) and Silvia Pinal (in the last two).

== Retirement ==
After her marriage, Aguilar retired from her film career. She resided for several years in Peru, where she founded a chain of beauty salons and taquerias. In 1976, she finally returned to Mexico for a musical revue in the Teatro Blanquita with "Resortes", alongside the Cuban rumbera Rosa Carmina. In 1981, she returned to Peru and presented the successful musical revues Perú...te traigo un Son and Salsa Caliente '82.

In 2003, the Mexican film director Rafael Montero, convinced her to make a brief appearance in the film Dame tu cuerpo, starring actors Rafael Sánchez Navarro and Luz María Zetina.

In 2010, Aguilar was honored in the city of Miami, Florida, where her career was recognized and she was awarded the keys to the city, from the mayor Tomás Regalado.

== Personal life and death ==
She married the Peruvian businessman Raul Beraún. After retiring, she became pregnant and decided to devote herself to her children and marriage. Her husband died in a plane crash in 1962. They had three children: Daphne, Raul and Jorge.

On 8 November 2021, Aguilar died at the age of 97 in Mexico City. The news was made public through her official Facebook account. Her funeral was held the next day and she was buried on 10 November, at the Panteón Jardín cemetery.

== Filmography ==
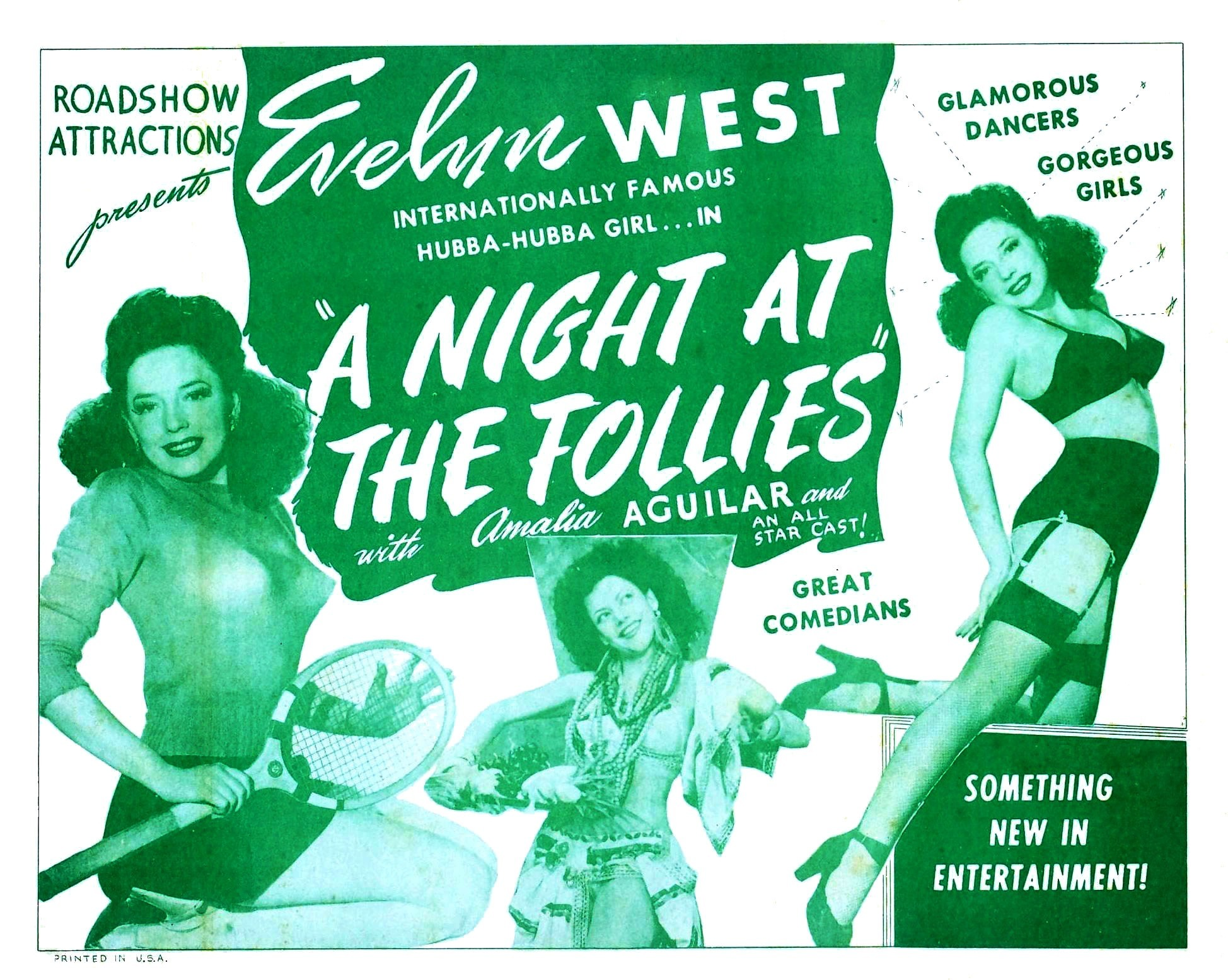
Aguilar in the film poster for A Night at the Follies (1947)

- Pervertida (1946)
- A Night in the Follies (1947)
- Conozco a los dos (1948)
- Tender Pumpkins (1949)
- Dicen que soy mujeriego (1949)
- Love in Every Port (1949)
- Novia a la medida (1949)
- El Colmillo de Buda (1949)
- La vida en broma (1950)
- To the Sound of the Mambo (1950)
- Ritmos del Caribe (1950)
- The Guests of the Marquesa (1951)
- Lost Love (1951)
- Tropical Delirium (1952)
- The Three Happy Friends (1952)
- Las Interesadas (1953)
- My Three Merry Widows (1953)
- Los dineros del diablo (1953)
- Las Cariñosas (1954)
- Las Viudas del Cha Cha Cha (1955)
- Los platillos Voladores (1956)
- Los televisionudos (1957)
- Dame tu Cuerpo (2003)

== Bibliography ==
- Muñoz Castillo, Fernando (1993). Las Reinas del Tropico: María Antonieta Pons, Meche Barba, Amalia Aguilar, Ninón Sevilla & Rosa Carmina. Grupo Azabache. ISBN 968-6084-85-1.
- Las Rumberas del Cine Mexicano (The Rumberas of the Mexican Cinema) (1999). In SOMOS. México: Editorial Televisa, S. A. de C. V.
- Agrasánchez Jr., Rogelio (2001). Bellezas del cine mexicano/Beauties of Mexican Cinema. Archivo Fílmico Agrasánchez. ISBN 968-5077-11-8.
