= Nosotros (disambiguation) =

Nosotros is a personal pronoun in Spanish.

Nosotros may also refer to:

- Nosotros (film), 1945 Mexican film
- Nosotros (magazine), Argentine cultural magazine (1907–1943)
- Nosotros (group), Spanish anarchist militant group (1931–1936)
- Nosotros (political party), a political party in Guatemala
