= Lilia del Valle =

Mexican actress (1928–2013)

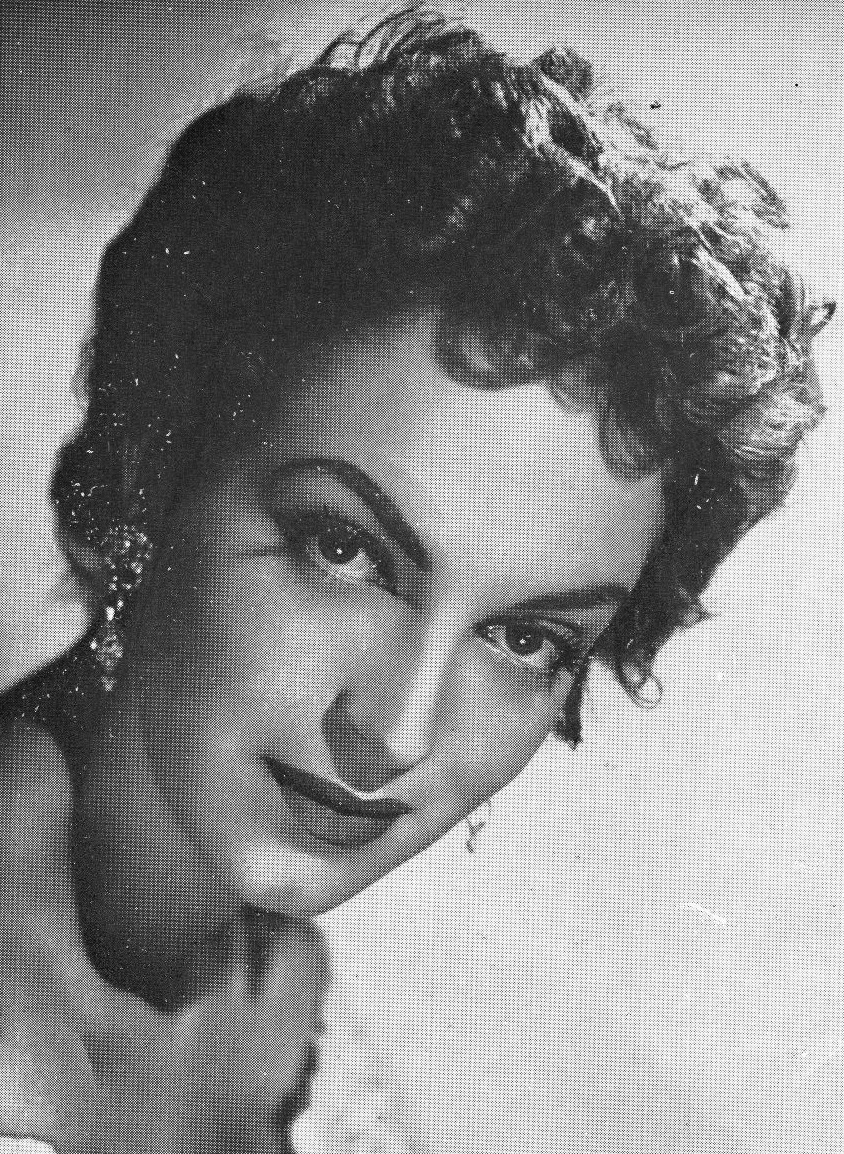
Lilia del Valle in 1954

Lilia del Valle (30 April 1928, in Mexico City – 7 January 2013, in Santo Domingo) was a Mexican actress. She appeared in films such as Las tres alegres comadres (1952) and Las interesadas (1952), together with Amalia Aguilar and Lilia Prado, Mis tres viudas alegres (1953) and Las cariñosas (1953) with Silvia Pinal, Nadie muere dos veces (1953), with Luis Aguilar and Abel Salazar, and Esposas infieles (1956).

== Selected filmography ==
- Doctor on Call (1950)
- The Beautiful Dreamer (1952)
- The Three Happy Friends (1952)
- The Island of Women (1953)
- My Three Merry Widows (1953)
- The Loving Women (1953)
- When You Come Back to Me (1953)
