= Ritmos del Caribe =

- Directed by: Juan José Ortega
- Written by: Neftalí Beltrán; Juan José Ortega
- Produced by: Octavio Gómez Castro; Juan José Ortega
- Starring: Amalia Aguilar; Rafael Baledón; Susana Guízar; Rita Montaner
- Cinematography: Jorge Stahl Jr.
- Music by: Gonzalo Curiel
- Distributed by: Compañía Cinematográfica Mexicana
- Release date: December 6, 1950 (México)
- Running time: 93 minutes
- Country: Mexico
- Language: Spanish

Ritmos del Caribe (Caribbean Rhythms) is a Mexican musical film directed by Juan José Ortega. It was released in 1950 and starring Amalia Aguilar and Rafael Baledón.

== Plot ==
A Cuban rumbera undergoes an ordeal to fall in love with a Mexican doctor. The problem between the two is that the man is married.

== Cast ==
- Amalia Aguilar
- Rafael Baledón
- Susana Guízar
- Rita Montaner
- Roberto Cobo
- La Sonora Matancera
- Los Panchos

== Reviews ==
Shortly before starring in the film Al son del mambo (1950), the Cuban rumbera Amalia Aguilar highlights of this musical film with a minimal plot. Fortunately, the dramatic moments of the film are buried by musical interventions of Daniel Santos, Bienvenido Granda, La Sonora Matancera, Los Panchos, Rita Montaner and the explosive presence of Amalia, who brings a sensuality and rhythm out of series.
