= Love, How Bad You Are =

1953 film by José Díaz Morales

- Directed by: José Díaz Morales
- Written by: José Díaz Morales; Carlos Sampelayo
- Produced by: Emilio Tuero
- Starring: Emilio Tuero; Emilia Guiú; José María Linares-Rivas
- Cinematography: Ezequiel Carrasco
- Edited by: Fernando Martínez
- Music by: Gonzalo Curiel
- Production company: Filmadora Argel
- Release date: 15 September 1953
- Country: Mexico
- Language: Spanish

Love, How Bad You Are (Spanish: ¡Amor, qué malo eres!) is a 1953 Mexican crime film directed by José Díaz Morales and starring Emilio Tuero, Emilia Guiú and José María Linares-Rivas.

== Cast ==
- Emilio Tuero as Carlos Durán
- Emilia Guiú as Norka Olguín
- José María Linares-Rivas as El filántropo
- Evangelina Elizondo as Lilia de la Cueva
- Arturo Martínez as Gángter
- Mario Ruiz Armengol as Johnny
- Rosario Gálvez
- Luis Aragón as Jefe de policía
- Eduardo Acuña as Bartender
- Manuel Casanueva
- Rogelio Fernández
- José Luis Rojas

== Bibliography ==
- David Pierce. Motion Picture Copyrights & Renewals, 1950-1959. Milestone, 1989.
