= Coqueta (1949 film) =

1949 film by Fernando A. Rivero

Coquette
- Directed by: Fernando A. Rivero
- Written by: Álvaro Custodio; Mauricio Magdaleno; Fernando A. Rivero; Carlos Sampelayo
- Produced by: Guillermo Calderón; Pedro A. Calderón
- Starring: Ninón Sevilla; Agustín Lara; Víctor Junco
- Cinematography: Alex Phillips
- Edited by: Alfredo Rosas Priego
- Music by: Antonio Díaz Conde
- Production company: Producciones Calderón
- Release date: 22 July 1949
- Running time: 87 minutes
- Country: Mexico
- Language: Spanish

Coquette (Spanish:Coqueta) is a 1949 Mexican musical film directed by Fernando A. Rivero, and starring Ninón Sevilla, Agustín Lara, and Víctor Junco. The film's sets were designed by the art director José Rodríguez Granada.

== Cast ==
- Ninón Sevilla as Marta del Valle
- Agustín Lara as Don Rubén
- Víctor Junco as Luciano Martínez, el caimán
- Armando Silvestre as Rodolfo
- José Luis Moreno as Margarito
- César del Campo as Mario Roel
- Tana Lynn as Belén
- Waldo Custodio as Sr. Rivera, dueño cabaret
- Irma Haro Esmeralda as Cantante
- Haydeé Caceres
- Kiko Mendive as Bailarín
- Mercedes Soler as Maestra
- Jorge Mondragón as Doctor
- Gaby Roman
- Enriqueta Reza as Tendera solterona
- Lupe Carriles as Tendera solterona
- Gerardo del Castillo as Amigo del Luciano
- Ana María Hernández as Miembra del patronato
- Concepción Martínez as Huesped hotel
- Kika Meyer as Cabaretera borracha
- José Morcillo as Presidente del patronato
- Rubén Márquez as Cliente cabaret
- Lupita Torrentera as Bailarina

== Bibliography ==
- Andrew Grant Wood. Agustin Lara: A Cultural Biography. OUP USA, 2014.
