= José María Linares-Rivas =

Spanish actor

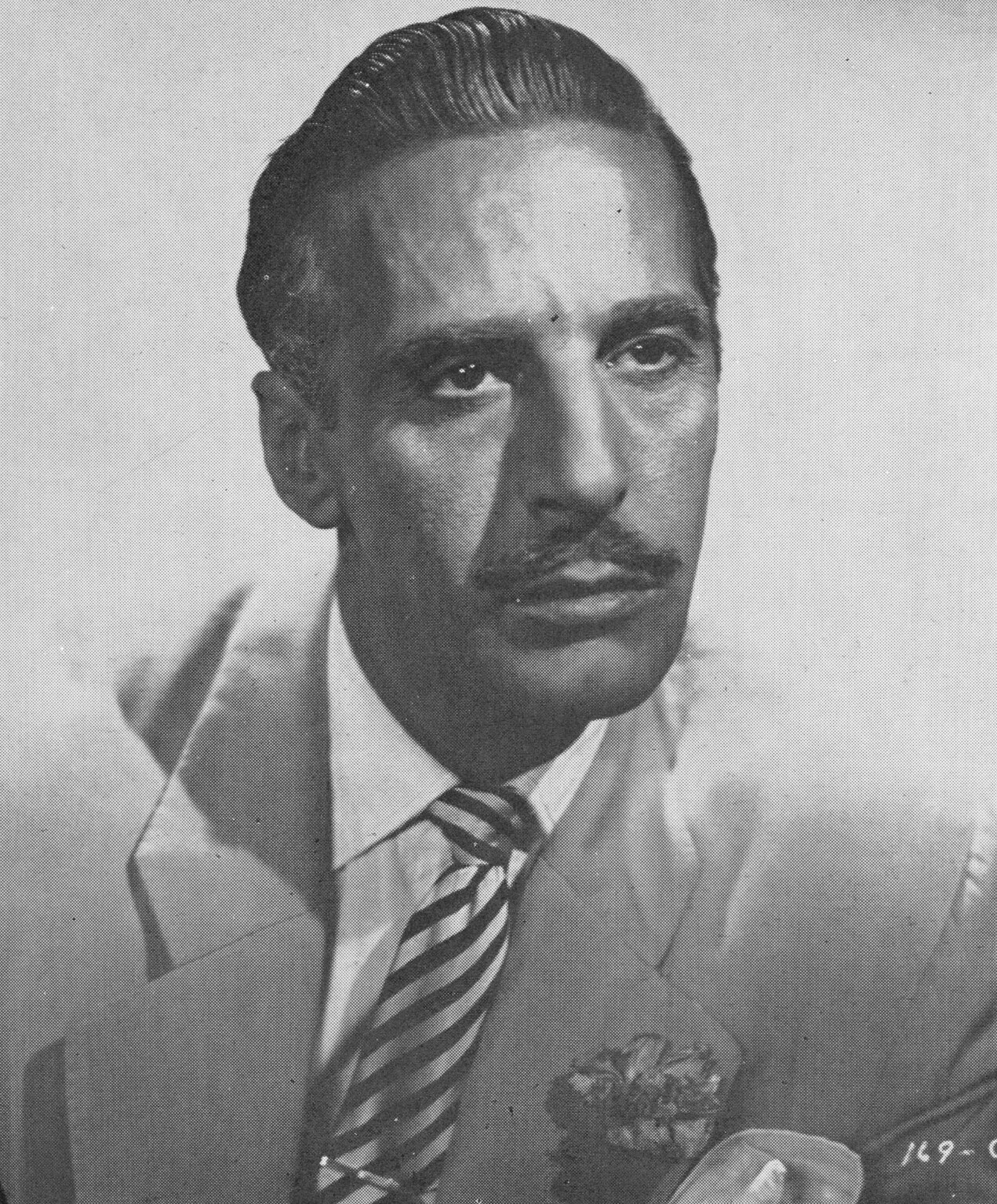
- José María Linares-Rivas in 1954
- Born: 17 March 1901; Madrid, Spain
- Died: 13 April 1955 (aged 54); Mexico City, Mexico
- Occupations: Cinema Actor, Director
- Years active: 1933-1955

José María Linares-Rivas (17 March 1901 - 13 April 1955) was a Spanish actor. He appeared in more than seventy films from 1933 to 1955.

== Filmography ==
Year	Title	Role	Notes
1934	World Crisis		
1934	Our Lady of Sorrows		
1949	The Fallen Angel		
1950	Traces of the Past		
1950	Mala hembra		
1950	The Devil Is a Woman		
1951	Port of Temptation		
1951	In the Flesh		
1951	Negro es mi color		
1951	From the Can-Can to the Mambo		
1951	Engagement Ring		
1951	History of a Heart		
1952	The Martyr of Calvary		
1952	Acapulco		
1952	Soledad's Shawl		
1952	The Justice of the Wolf		
1952	The Night Falls		
1953	You've Got Me By the Wing		
1953	A Divorce		
1953	The Last Round		
1953	The Message of Death		
1953	Love, How Bad You Are		
1953	El Monstruo resucitado		
1953	Four Hours Before His Death		
1953	The Three Perfect Wives		
1953	The Player		
1953	My Three Merry Widows		
1955	Un extraño en la escalera		
1955	Madame X		
1955	El vendedor de muñecas		
1955	The Criminal Life of Archibaldo de la Cruz		
1955	Una mujer en la calle		
1955	De carne somos		
1956	The Bandits of Cold River		
