= A Divorce =

1953 film by Emilio Gómez Muriel

- Directed by: Emilio Gómez Muriel
- Written by: Julio Alejandro; Paul Bourget (novel); Emilio Gómez Muriel
- Produced by: Modesto Pascó; Emilio Tuero
- Starring: Marga López; Carlos López Moctezuma; Elda Peralta
- Cinematography: Ezequiel Carrasco
- Edited by: Fernando Martínez
- Music by: Gonzalo Curiel
- Production company: Argel Films
- Release date: 12 August 1953
- Running time: 105 minutes
- Country: Mexico
- Language: Spanish

A Divorce (Spanish: Un divorcio) is a 1953 Mexican drama film directed by Emilio Gómez Muriel and starring Marga López, Carlos López Moctezuma, and Elda Peralta.

The film's art direction was by Francisco Marco Chillet.

== Cast ==
- Marga López as Cristina Fuentes
- Carlos López Moctezuma as Alberto Luna
- Elda Peralta as Berta
- Raúl Farell as Luciano
- Julio Villarreal as Sacerdote
- María Gentil Arcos as Pilar
- Elisa Quintanilla as Lupita
- Armando Velasco as Mayordomo
- Elodia Hernández
- Rodolfo Calvo
- Emilio Girón
- María Victoria Llamas as Maruja
- Cristina Trevi
- Magda Donato as Abuela de Maruja
- Mario Sevilla as Amigo de Alberto
- José María Linares-Rivas as Señor Saldivar
- Victorio Blanco as Empleado boliche
- Ángel Merino as Hombre en biblioteca
- Alicia Montoya as Mujer en iglesia

== Bibliography ==
- María Luisa Amador. Cartelera cinematográfica, 1950-1959. UNAM, 1985.
