= Nosotros (film) =

1945 Mexican romantic drama film

- Directed by: Fernando A. Rivero
- Starring: Ricardo Montalbán; Emilia Guiú; Esther Luquín
- Release date: 1945
- Country: Mexico

Nosotros is a 1945 Mexican romantic drama film directed by Fernando A. Rivero. It stars Ricardo Montalbán, Emilia Guiú, and Esther Luquín.
