= Jorge Negrete =

Mexican actor and singer (1911–1953)

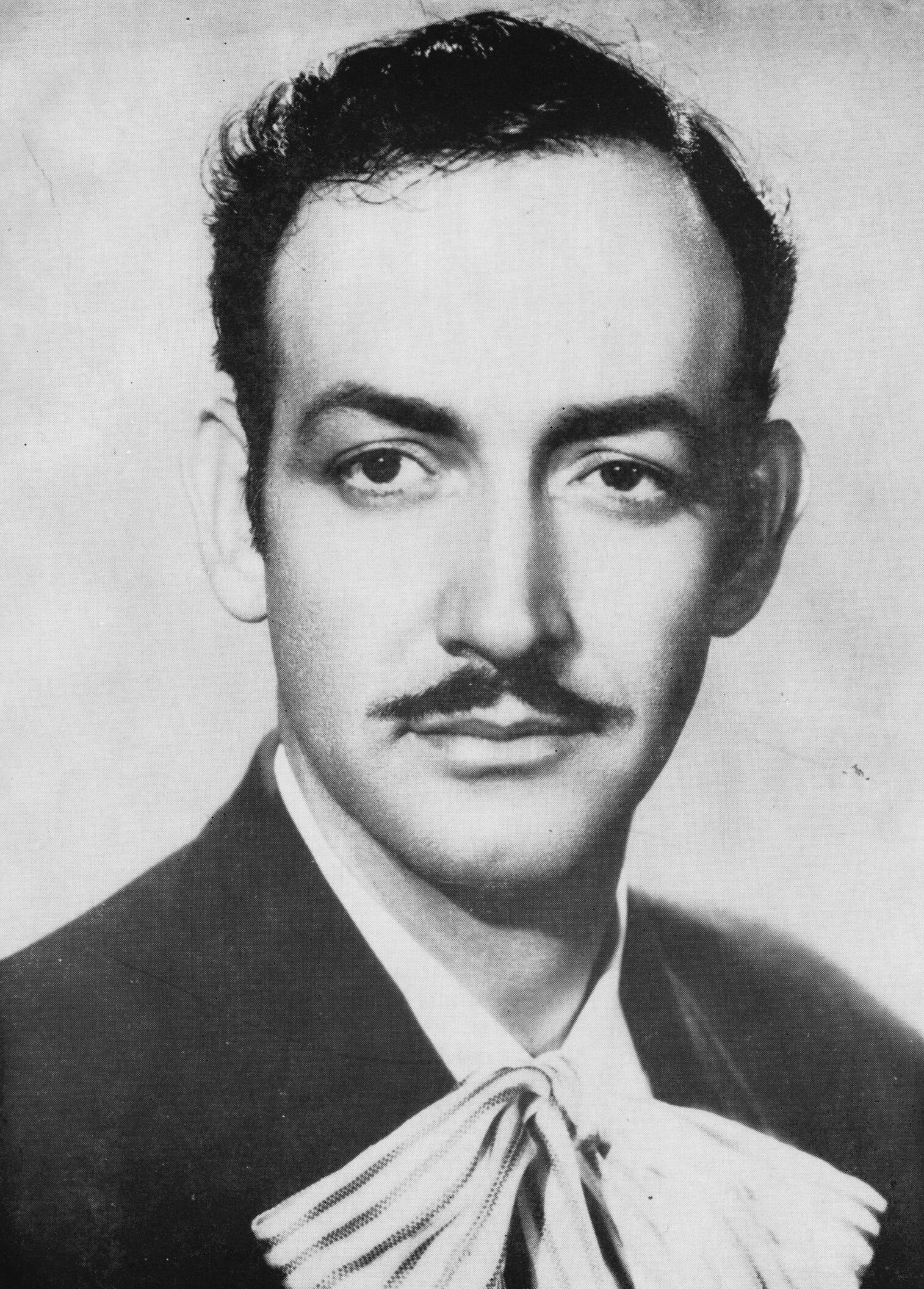
- Negrete in 1953
- Born: Jorge Alberto Negrete Moreno; 30 November 1911; Guanajuato City, Guanajuato, Mexico
- Died: 5 December 1953 (aged 42); Los Angeles, California, U.S.
- Occupations: Singer, actor
- Years active: 1930–1953
- Spouses: Elisa Christy (m. 1940; div. 1942) María Félix (m. 1952)
- Partner: Gloria Marin (1942–1952)
- Children: 1

Jorge Alberto Negrete Moreno (Spanish pronunciation: [ˈxoɾxe neˈɣɾete]; 30 November 1911 – 5 December 1953) was a Mexican singer and actor, specialized in the musical genre of ranchera. His posthumous album "Fiesta Mexicana Volumen II" has been ranked No. 163 by critics on their list of the greatest Latin albums of all time.

== Life and career ==
Negrete was born in the city of Guanajuato and had two brothers and three sisters. His father was a Mexican Army colonel who fought with the Revolutionary faction called Northern Division (División del Norte); however, around 1920, he quit his military career and moved with his family to Mexico City. There he found a job as a math teacher at several institutions, such as the German College "Alexander Von Humboldt", where his sons David and Jorge studied until middle school. As a result, they became fluent in the German language. Jorge learned other languages at the Heroico Colegio Militar (military academy of Mexico): English, French, and Italian. From an early age, Negrete demonstrated great brilliance and rapidly became a prominent student in the eyes of his teachers.

At the age of thirteen, because of Negrete's misbehavior, his father decided to enroll him in the military. He graduated with the rank of sub-lieutenant from El Colegio Militar. This was where his interest in music developed. His military training also forged him a gallant presence and character which would later benefit him in his acting career. Negrete met and studied under José Pierson, a prestigious singing professor who became fascinated the moment he heard Negrete sing. Pierson helped Negrete develop his talent for opera, and at the age of twenty Negrete began to sing for Radio XETR.

Negrete went to the United States and in 1932 recorded several operas using the stage name Alberto Moreno. He collaborated with Xavier Cugat, landed bookings at Latin clubs, met his first wife (dancer Elisa Christy), and connected with cinematographer Ramón Peón, who cast Negrete in his first film, La madrina del Diablo (1937) (English: "The Devil's Godmother"). He went on to make 37 other films.

He married twice, both to famous actresses with whom he shared professional credits: Elisa Christy and María Félix. He also lived with his frequent co-star Gloria Marín for more than ten years. She acted in 10 of his 44 films.

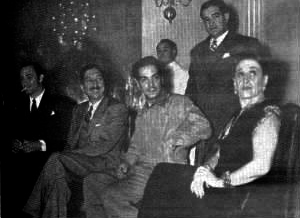
Meeting with Mexican president Miguel Alemán Valdés, from left to right Negrete, the president Miguel Alemán Valdés, Mario Moreno Cantinflas and María Tereza Montoya

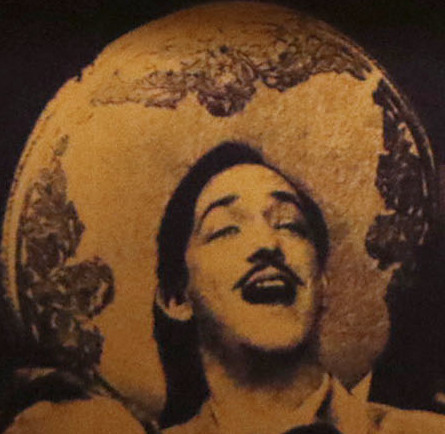
Jorge Negrete, 1950s

He began his career on the radio in 1931 in Mexico City singing operatic parts. In 1936 he signed with NBC Television for a TV program with Cuban and Mexican musicians. He returned to Mexico in 1937 to act in the film La madrina del Diablo ("The Devil's Godmother"), and because of the film's success he was able to sign for several more the next three years. In 1938 he starred in La Valentina with Elisa Christy and then in Juntos pero no revueltos.

After working in Havana and Hollywood, Negrete was called to act in ¡Ay, Jalisco, no te rajes! ("Hey Jalisco, Don't Back Down!"), which made him an international Latin star and helped create the charro film genre. During filming he met Gloria Marín, kicking off their romance and the string of films they worked on together. He complemented his film career by singing rancheras touring Latin America with the trio Los Tres Calaveras, performing at concerts, and making personal appearances. He was offered the main role in El peñón de las ánimas (The Rock of Souls) and wanted Marín to be his co-star. In spite of his protests, newcomer María Félix was cast instead, and although they at first despised each other during production, she would eventually become his wife.

Negrete visited Chile in 1946 where a local Mexican music scene was thriving, partially as a result of the influence of Mexican cinema.

Negrete was one of the founders, and most important leaders, of the Mexican National Association of Actors (ANDA), succeeding Cantinflas as its chairman. In 1952 actress Leticia Palma was involved in the struggle between Cantinflas and Negrete over leadership of the union, with Palma campaigning actively for Cantinflas. On January 2, 1953, Palma was "rescued" by Major Manuel González, who helped her get a taxi to safety while she was being pursued by an angry mob led by Negrete, who was after Palma for having stolen documents regarding her contract violations. Palma filed an assault charge against Negrete.

Eight days later, ANDA held a special assembly to decide on Palma. Cantinflas argued on her behalf, attempting to negotiate a settlement. Negrete would allow nothing less than her expulsion from the union, and Palma likewise refused to withdraw the charge of assault. Just before the vote, a number of actresses left the room in protest. The remaining members voted in favor of expulsion, thus ending Palma's film career.

== Death and aftermath ==
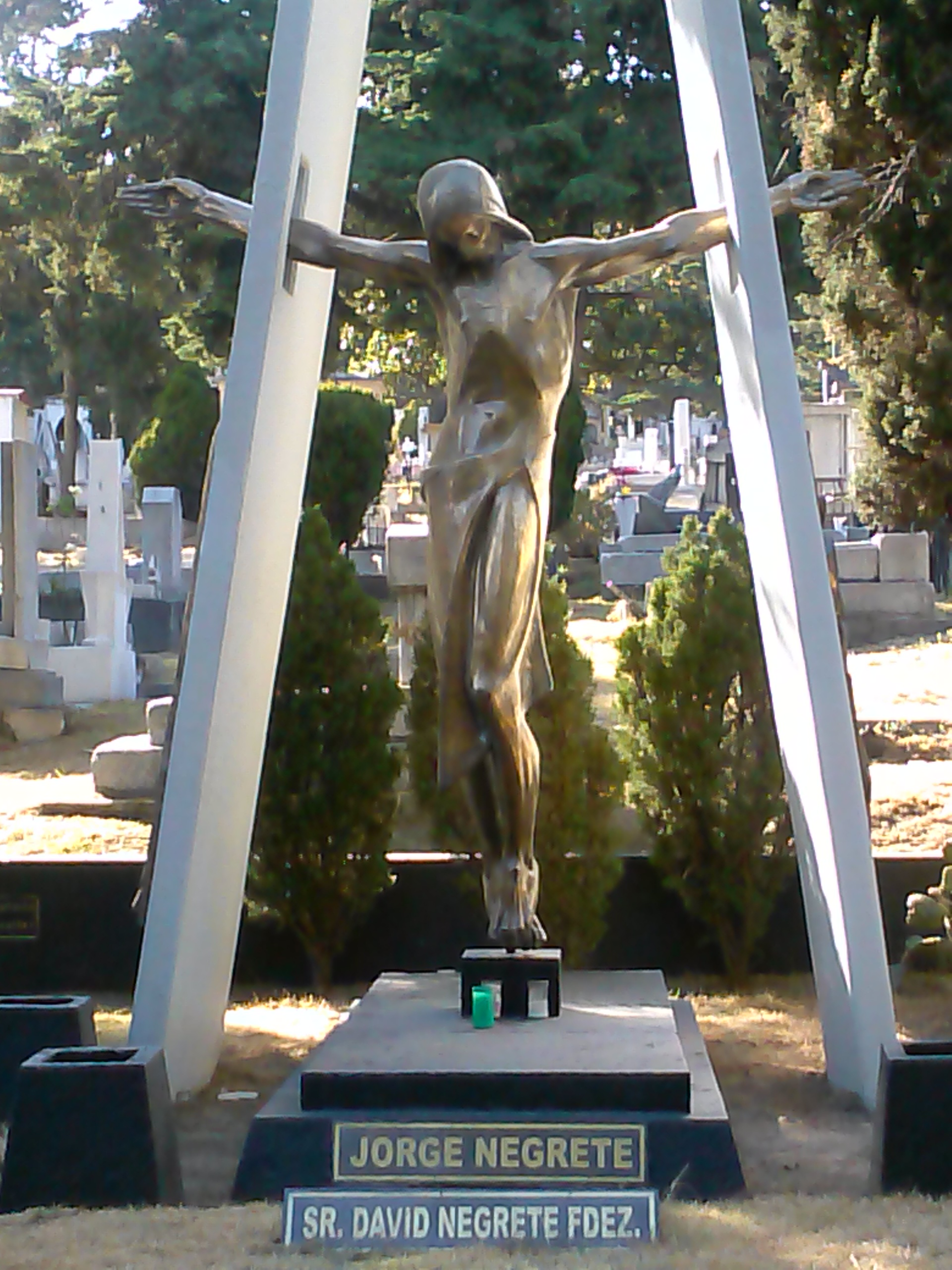
Tomb of Negrete in Panteón Jardín

In 1953 during a business trip to Los Angeles, Negrete died of complications from hepatic cirrhosis, from which he had been suffering since 1937. According to his wishes, his body was flown back to Mexico and buried. He was 42 years old.

He was the first of "Los Tres Gallos" ("The Three Roosters") to die—the other two were Pedro Infante and Javier Solís. All three of them died within a span of 13 years.

Thousands of fans attended his funeral and followed the hearse to the Panteón Jardín cemetery, where he was buried in the actors' corner. On December 5th, the anniversary of his death, fans still pay tribute to "El Charro Cantor" ("The Singing Cowboy") at his tomb, and television and radio stations air marathons of his films and songs.

The centennial of his birth was commemorated in 2011. Several tribute concerts and presentations took place throughout Mexico and some European countries with Hispanic culture and heritage.

== Family ==
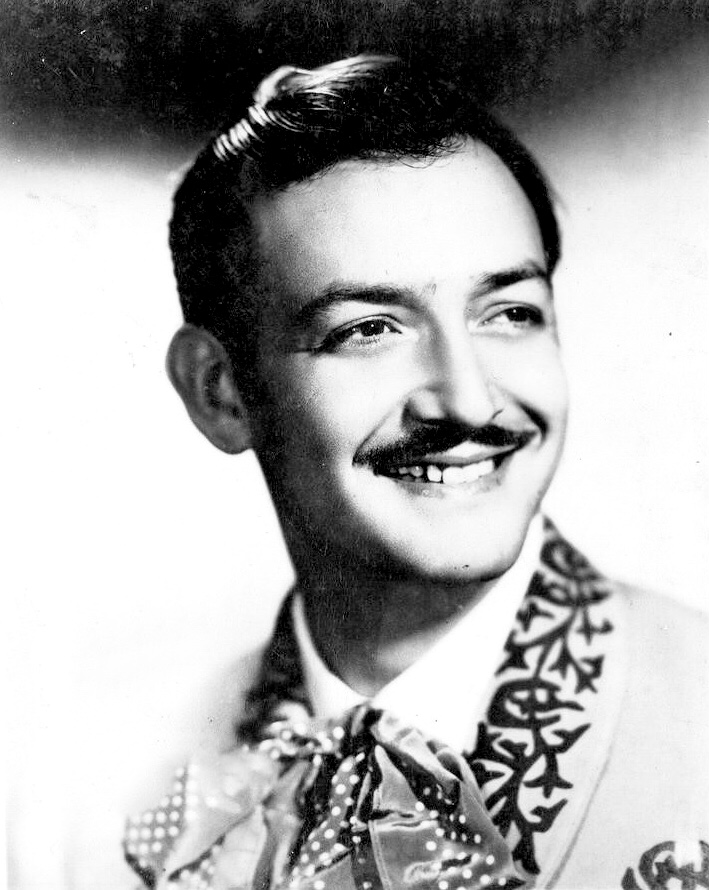
Photographed for a publicity image from the 1940s.

Negrete's parents were Emilia Moreno Anaya and David Negrete Fernández. He descended from outstanding Mexican liberal military men, including Miguel Negrete, who participated in the Battle of Puebla. His siblings were named Consuelo, Emilia, Teresa, David, and Rubén.

Elisa Christy gave birth to his daughter Diana (his only child) in 1942. She died in 2021.

Negrete has five grandchildren: Déborah, Diana, Rafael, Liliana, and Lorenzo. Rafael and Lorenzo are professional singers and use Negrete for their artistic names.

His stepson was actor Enrique Álvarez Félix.

== Filmography ==
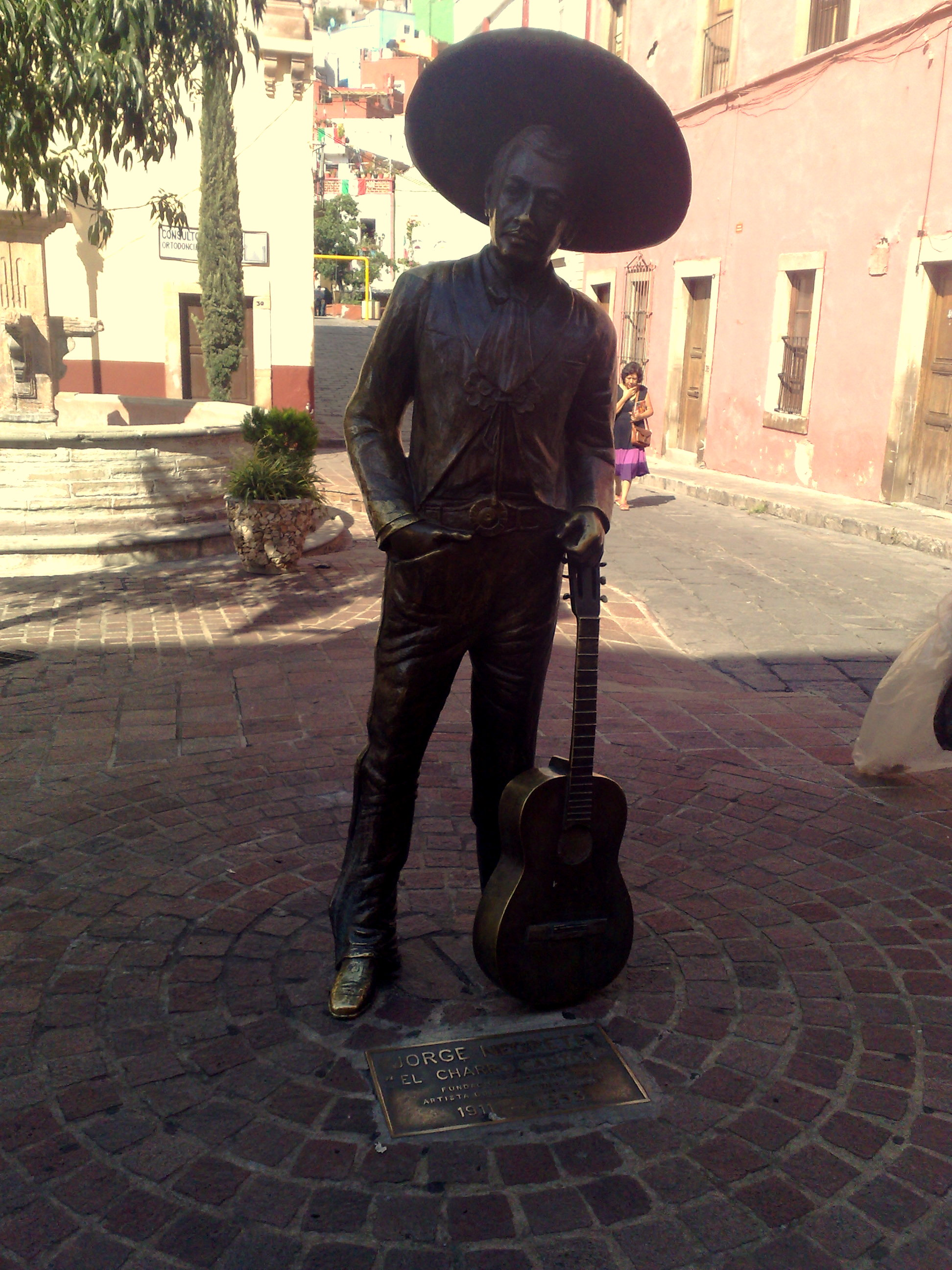
Monument in Mexico

- El rapto (The Kidnapping) (1953)
- Reportaje (Report News) (1953)
- Dos tipos de cuidado (Two Careful Fellows) (1953)
- Hechos uno para el otro (Made for Each Other) (1953)
- Tal para cual (To each his own) (1952)
- Un gallo en corral ajeno (The Rooster in the wrong Chicken house) (1952)
- Los tres alegres compadres (The Three Happy Compadres) (1952)
- Hay un niño en su futuro (There is a child in your future) (1952)
- Siempre tuya (Forever Yours) (1952)
- Lluvia roja (Red Rain) (1950)
- La posesión (The Possession) (1950)
- Teatro Apolo (Apollo Theatre) (1950)
- Una Gallega en México (A Galician in Mexico) (1949)
- Jalisco canta en Sevilla (Jalisco Sings in Seville) (1949)
- Allá en el rancho grande (Out On the Big Ranch) (1949)
- Si Adelita se fuera con otro (If Adelita went out with another) (1948)
- Gran Casino (Grand Casino) (1947)
- Camino de Sacramento (The Road to Sacramento) (1945)
- El ahijado de la muerte (Death's godson) (1946)
- En tiempos de la inquisición (In the Times of the Inquisition) (1946)
- No basta ser charro (It's Not Enough to Be a Charro) (1946)
- Canaima a.k.a. El Dios del mal (The God of Evil) (1945)
- Hasta que perdió Jalisco (Until Jalisco lost) (1945)
- Me he de comer esa tuna Mexico (I have to eat this tuna) a.k.a. El día que me quieras (The day that you love me) (1945)
- Cuando quiere un Mexicano (When a Mexican loves) a.k.a. La Gauchita y el charro (The little [Argentinian] cowgirl and the [Mexican] cowboy) (1944)
- El rebelde (The Rebel) (1943)
- Una carta de amor (A Love Letter) (1943)
- Tierra de pasiones (Land of Passions) (1943)
- Aquí llegó el valentón a.k.a. El Fanfarrón (here came the brave) (1943)
- El jorobado a.k.a. Enrique de Lagardere (The Hunchback) (1943)
- El peñón de las ánimas (the rock of souls) (1942)
- Así se quiere en Jalisco (This is how One Loves in Jalisco) (1942)
- Historia de un gran amor (Story of a Great Love) (1942)
- When the Stars Travel (1942)
- Sed, sangre y sol (Thirst, Blood and Sun) (1942)
- Fiesta (party) (1941)
- ¡Ay Jalisco, no te rajes! (Jalisco, Don't Back Down!) (1941)
- Una luz en mi camino (A Light on My Way) (1939)
- Juntos, pero no revueltos (Together, Not Mixed) (1939)
- El cementerio de las águilas (The Cemetery of the Eagles) (1939)
- Juan sin miedo (1939) (Fearless John)
- Perjura (Perjurer) (1938)
- Caminos de ayer (Roads of Yesterday) (1938)
- La Valentina (1938)
- La madrina del Diablo (The Devil's Godmother) (1937)
- Cuban Nights (1937)
