= The Three Happy Compadres =

1952 film

- Directed by: Julián Soler
- Written by: Ernesto Cortázar; Óscar J. Brooks; Julián Soler
- Produced by: Óscar J. Brooks; Ernesto Enríquez; Felipe Mier
- Starring: Jorge Negrete; Pedro Armendáriz; Andrés Soler; Rebeca Iturbide; Rosa de Castilla
- Cinematography: Jorge Stahl Jr.
- Edited by: Carlos Savage
- Music by: Manuel Esperón
- Production companies: Producciones Mier & Brooks
- Distributed by: Clasa-Mohme
- Release date: 11 April 1952
- Running time: 118 minutes
- Country: Mexico
- Language: Spanish

The Three Happy Compadres (Spanish: Los Tres Alegres Compadres) is a 1952 Mexican western musical comedy film directed by Julián Soler and starring Jorge Negrete, Pedro Armendáriz, Andrés Soler and Rebeca Iturbide. This film marked the film debut of the actress and singer Rosa de Castilla. It is a autoparody of the film released the same year, The Three Happy Friends. It was shot at the Churubusco Studios in Mexico City. The film's sets were designed by the art director José Rodríguez Granada. It is part of the tradition of Ranchera films, popular during the Golden Age of Mexican Cinema.

== Cast ==
- Jorge Negrete as Pancho Mireles
- Pedro Armendáriz as Baldomero Mireles
- Andrés Soler as Don Juan Mireles
- Rebeca Iturbide as Diana
- Wolf Ruvinskis as Freddy
- Lucrecia Muñoz as Chica dispara rifle
- Tito Novaro as Jugador cantina
- Armando Velasco as Agente policía
- Georgina González as Chica pide canción
- Manuel Trejo Morales as Hombre cantina
- Mario Llanes as Esbirro de Freddy
- Rogelio Fernández as Jugador cantina
- Agustín Fernández as Jugador cantina
- Rosa de Castilla as Lolita

== Bibliography ==
- Gennari, Daniela Treveri. The Palgrave Handbook of Comparative New Cinema Histories. Springer Nature, 2023.
- Riera, Emilio García. Historia documental del cine mexicano: 1951-1952. Universidad de Guadalajara, 1992.
- Wilt, David E. The Mexican Filmography, 1916 through 2001. McFarland, 2024.
