= Doctor on Call =

1950 film

- Directed by: Adolfo Fernández Bustamante
- Written by: Adolfo Fernández Bustamante; Paulino Masip
- Produced by: Fernando de Fuentes; Juan Bustillo Oro; Miguel Zacarías
- Starring: Armando Calvo; Lilia del Valle; Luis Beristáin
- Cinematography: Ezequiel Carrasco
- Edited by: José W. Bustos
- Music by: Gonzalo Curiel
- Production company: Producciones Dyana
- Distributed by: Azteca Films
- Release date: 26 July 1950
- Running time: 94 minutes
- Country: Mexico
- Language: Spanish

Doctor on Call (Spanish: Médico de guardia) is a 1950 Mexican drama film directed by Adolfo Fernández Bustamante and starring Armando Calvo, Lilia del Valle and Luis Beristáin. It was shot at the Tepeyac Studios in Mexico City. The film's sets were designed by the art director Javier Torres Torija.

== Cast ==
- Armando Calvo as El Director de Hospital (Dr. Enrique Méndez)
- Lilia del Valle as La Jefa de Enfermeras (Beatriz Lozano)
- Luis Beristáin as El Investigador (Dr. Jaime Prieto)
- Josefina Escobedo as La Doctora (Doctora Yáñez)
- Armando Sáenz as El Practicante (Ruiz)
- Juan Calvo as El Padre sin hijos (Señor Hinojosa)
- Patricia Morán as La Moribunda (Carmen Rosado)
- Miguel Ángel López is disamb as El Torero (Lalo)
- Queta Lavat as La Enfermera (Irene)
- Felipe Montoya as El Médico de Comisaría (Dr. Sevilla)
- Enrique Díaz 'Indiano' as El Droguista (Sr. Bermúdez)
- Irma Dorantes as La Seducida (Magdalena Orozco)
- Rafael Estrada as El Seductor (Ricardo)
- Mimí Derba as La Madre (doña Carmen, madre de Jaime)
- Carolina Barret as La Cabaretera (Inés Rodríguez
- Nicolás Rodríguez as El Del Apéndice
- Héctor Mateos as El Influyente
- María Gentil Arcos as Madre de Lalo

== Bibliography ==
- Tuñón, Julia. Body & spirit: Five centuries of medical architecture in Mexico. Secretaría de Salud, 2005.
