= My Three Merry Widows =

1953 film by Fernando Cortés

- Directed by: Fernando Cortés
- Written by: Fernando Cortés; Carlos Sampelayo; Alfredo Varela
- Produced by: Óscar J. Brooks; Felipe Mier
- Starring: Adalberto Martínez «Resortes» Amalia Aguilar; Lilia del Valle; Silvia Pinal
- Cinematography: José Ortiz Ramos
- Edited by: Carlos Savage
- Music by: Manuel Esperón
- Production companies: Mier & Brooks Productions
- Release date: 16 September 1953
- Running time: 100 minutes
- Country: Mexico
- Language: Spanish

My Three Merry Widows (Spanish Mis tres viudas alegres) is a 1953 Mexican musical comedy film directed by Fernando Cortés and starring Adalberto Martínez «Resortes», Amalia Aguilar, Lilia del Valle and Silvia Pinal. It is a loose sequel to the 1952 film The Three Happy Friends. It was shot at the Churubusco Studios in Mexico City. The film's sets were designed by the art director Ramón Rodríguez Granada.

== Plot ==
Don Jose Samaniego (Adalberto Martinez), an old and ridiculous man, marries Silvia (Silvia Pinal), a 20-year-old girl. On their wedding night before the marriage be consummated, Don José died after suffering a seizure. Through the obituaries many people learn about his death and go to the cemetery. Among the visitors is Amalia (Amalia Aguilar), with her marriage certificate and says that in their wedding day, Don José got a call, went and never returned. Also coming Lilia (Lilia del Valle), another widow, saying that her husband was kidnapped on their wedding night. The day when the will of Don José is read, the three women learns that the man also had a child with a cook. He asks who seek this woman and wait five years to take part in the inheritance.

== Cast ==
- Amalia Aguilar as Amalia
- Lilia del Valle as Lilia
- Silvia Pinal as Silvia
- Adalberto Martínez «Resortes» as Don José Sanmaniego / Pepito
- José María Linares-Rivas as Don Celedonio
- Tito Novaro as Estanislao Girao
- Fernando Medina as Conde Popoff
- Gloria de Córdoba as Secretary
- Nacho Contla as Chofer
- Jorge Casanova as Chofer

== Reviews ==
In 1952 the Cuban rumbera Amalia Aguilar, Lilia del Valle and Lilia Prado staged The Three Merry Midwives and The Interested Women, directed by Tito Davison and Rogelio A. González respectively. As the films were successful, the formula is repeated and Silvia Pinal was chosen to replace Lilia Prado to team up with the other two actresses and interpreting together three sleepers, sympathetic, cheerful and, above all, very sexy women. The story runs after an absurd plot with supposedly scientific nonsense led by the Puerto Rican filmmaker Fernando Cortes, less skilled than Davison, but the grace of the three beautiful actresses and some good dancing numbers of Adalberto Martínez and Amalia Aguilar, make the movie bearable.

In 1953 Cortés filmed a new film with the three actresses: The Loving Women (Las cariñosas).

== Bibliography ==
- Wilt, David E. The Mexican Filmography, 1916 through 2001. McFarland, 2024.
