= Negro es mi color =

- Directed by: Tito Davison
- Starring: Marga López; Rita Montaner
- Music by: Manuel Esperón
- Release date: 6 April 1951
- Country: Mexico
- Language: Spanish

Negro es mi color is a 1951 Mexican musical film directed by Tito Davison.

== Cast ==
- Marga López - Luna / Blanca del Río
- Rita Montaner - Rita, madre de Luna
- Roberto Cañedo - Fernando Acuña
- José María Linares-Rivas - Don Álvaro, padre de Luna
- Freddy Fernández - Freddy
- Los Panchos - Trio
