= Good Night, My Love (1951 film) =

1951 film

- Directed by: Fernando A. Rivero
- Written by: Sidney T. Bruckner; Víctor Mora; Fernando A. Rivero; Gabriel Ruiz
- Produced by: Sidney T. Bruckner
- Starring: Ramón Armengod; Emilia Guiú; Gloria Ríos
- Cinematography: Víctor Herrera
- Edited by: Juan José Marino
- Music by: José de la Vega
- Production company: Producciones Espada
- Release date: 7 May 1951
- Running time: 92 minutes
- Country: Mexico
- Language: Spanish

Good Night, My Love (Spanish: Buenas noches mi amor) is a 1951 Mexican romantic drama film directed by Fernando A. Rivero and starring Ramón Armengod, Emilia Guiú and Gloria Ríos. The film's sets were designed by the art director Ramón Rodríguez Granada.

== Cast ==
- Ramón Armengod as Ramón Valdés
- Emilia Guiú as Josefina
- Gloria Ríos as Violeta
- Francisco Jambrina as Don Luis
- Luis Mussot as Don Miguel
- Manuel Arvide as Güero
- Juan Pulido as Polo
- Humberto Rodríguez as Cura
- Guillermo Familiar as Mauricio
- Lupe Carriles as Portera
- Salvador Quiroz as Don Braulio
- Pepe Ruiz Vélez as Locutor radio
- Julio Daner as Jefe policía
- Lupe del Castillo as Complice anciana de Mauricio
- Rogelio Fernández as Matias
- Leonor Baroccionas Yolanda
- Agustín de la Lanza as El Greñas
- Los Modernistas as Grupo musical

== Bibliography ==
- Amador, María Luisa. Cartelera cinematográfica, 1950-1959. UNAM, 1985.
- Riera, Emilio García. Historia documental del cine mexicano: 1949-1950. Universidad de Guadalajara, 1992
