= Port of Temptation =

1951 film

- Directed by: René Cardona
- Written by: Álvaro Custodio; José Luis de Celis
- Starring: Emilia Guiú; Ramón Armengod; Gloria Ríos
- Cinematography: Domingo Carrillo
- Edited by: Alfredo Rosas Priego
- Music by: Antonio Díaz Conde
- Production company: Cinematográfica Calderón
- Release date: 22 August 1951
- Running time: 77 minutes
- Country: Mexico
- Language: Spanish

Port of Temptation (Spanish: Puerto de tentación) is a 1951 Mexican crime drama film directed by René Cardona and starring Emilia Guiú, Ramón Armengod and Gloria Ríos. It was shot at the Clasa Studios in Mexico City. The film's sets were designed by the art director Francisco Marco Chillet.

== Cast ==
- Julio Ahuet
- Ramón Armengod
- José Arratia
- Victorio Blanco
- Florencio Castelló
- Alejandro Ciangherotti
- Pedro González Rojas
- Emilia Guiú
- José María Linares-Rivas
- Álvaro Matute
- Nelly Montiel
- José Luis Moreno
- Pepe Nava
- Gloria Ríos
- Juan Bruno Tarraza
- Hernán Vera
- María Victoria

== Bibliography ==
- Román Gubern. El Cine Español en el Exilio. Lumen, 1976.
