= Victims of Divorce =

1952 film

- Directed by: Fernando A. Rivero
- Written by: Rafael García Travesi; Fernando A. Rivero
- Produced by: Guillermo Calderón; Pedro A. Calderón
- Starring: Luis Aguilar; Esther Fernández; Emilia Guiú
- Cinematography: Rosalío Solano
- Edited by: Alfredo Rosas Priego
- Music by: Antonio Díaz Conde
- Production company: Producciones Calderón
- Release date: 20 November 1952
- Running time: 83 minutes
- Country: Mexico
- Language: Spanish

Victims of Divorce (German: Víctimas del divorcio) is a 1952 Mexican comedy drama film directed by Fernando A. Rivero and starring Luis Aguilar, Esther Fernández and Emilia Guiú. It was shot at the Tepeyac Studios in Mexico City. The film's sets were designed by the art director Jorge Fernández.

== Cast ==
- Ramón Armengod as Fernando Madrigal
- Luis Aguilar as Luis Madrigal
- Esther Fernández as Elena
- Emilia Guiú as Raquel
- Pedro Vargas as Pedro
- Rodolfo Acosta as Antonio
- Emma Roldán as Doña Chole
- Jorge Sareli as Señor del Campo
- Elena Luquín as Amigo de Raquel
- José Ortiz de Zárate asAbogado
- Héctor Mateos as Comisario
- Francisco Ledesma as Coreógrafo
- Los Tres Diamantes as Cantantes

== Bibliography ==
- Amador, María Luisa. Cartelera cinematográfica, 1950-1959. UNAM, 1985.
- Wood, Andrew Grant. Agustin Lara: A Cultural Biography. OUP, 2014.
