= The Only One (1952 film) =

- Directed by: Ramón Peón
- Produced by: Ramón Peón
- Starring: Rita Montaner
- Cinematography: Enrique Bravo
- Release date: 1952
- Country: Cuba
- Language: Spanish

The Only One (Spanish: La única) is a 1952 Cuban musical film directed by Ramón Peón and starring Rita Montaner and Miguel del Castillo.

== Cast ==
- Miguel del Castillo
- Harry Mimmo
- Rita Montaner
- Enrique Montaña
- Maritza Rosales

== Bibliography ==
- Alfonso J. García Osuna. The Cuban Filmography: 1897 through 2001. McFarland, 2003.
