= The Bandits of Cold River =

The Bandits of Río Frío
- Directed by: Rogelio A. González
- Written by: Manuel Payno (novel); Alfredo Varela; Rogelio A. González
- Produced by: Emilio Tuero
- Starring: Luis Aguilar; César del Campo; Dagoberto Rodríguez
- Cinematography: Raúl Martínez Solares
- Edited by: Carlos Savage
- Music by: Gonzalo Curiel
- Production companies: Filmadora Argel; Pydasa
- Distributed by: Columbia Pictures
- Release date: 4 February 1956
- Running time: 95 minutes
- Country: Mexico
- Language: Spanish

The Bandits of Cold River (Spanish: Los bandidos de Río Frío) is a 1956 Mexican western film directed by Rogelio A. González and starring Luis Aguilar, César del Campo and Dagoberto Rodríguez.

The film's sets were designed by the art director Francisco Marco Chillet.

== Cast ==
- Luis Aguilar as Juan Robreño
- César del Campo as Fernando de los Monteros, Marqués de Valle Alegre
- Dagoberto Rodríguez as Evaristo
- Fernando Casanova as Marcos, adulto
- Rita Macedo as Mariana del Sauz
- Fernando Soto "Mantequilla" as Hilario
- Prudencia Grifell as Agustina
- Miguel Ángel Ferriz as Padre de Juan
- Alfredo Varela as Lic. Lamparilla
- Víctor Velázquez as Coronel Barinelli
- Ernesto Finance as Señor presidente
- Georgina Barragán as Doña Cecilia
- Lupe Inclán as Yerbera
- Enriqueta Reza as Yerbera
- Berta Cervera as Tule, sirvienta
- Rogelio Fernández as Emperador, militar
- Manuel Vergara 'Manver' as José el tuerto
- Carmen Manzano as Pantaleona, criada de Cecilia
- José Chávez as Tendero
- José María Linares-Rivas
- Gregorio Acosta as José el largo
- Julio Ahuet as Cochero
- Daniel Arroyo as Hombre asaltado
- Victorio Blanco as Campesino anciano
- Guillermo Bravo Sosa as Borracho
- Enedina Díaz de León as Tía Panchita
- Vicente Lara as José
- Rosa María Montes as Cantante de ópera asaltado
- Inés Murillo as Vecina de Panchita
- Francisco Pando as Celso Barajas
- José Pardavé
- Nicolás Rodríguez hijo as Marcos, adolescente

== Bibliography ==
- William H. Beezley & Linda Ann Curcio. Latin American Popular Culture Since Independence: An Introduction. Rowman & Littlefield, 2012.
