= Nobody Dies Twice =

1953 film by Luis Spota

- Directed by: Luis Spota
- Written by: Luis Spota
- Produced by: Abel Salazar; Gregorio Walerstein
- Starring: Abel Salazar; Luis Aguilar; Lilia del Valle
- Cinematography: Carl Carvahal
- Edited by: Rafael Ceballos
- Music by: Manuel Esperón
- Production company: Cinematográfica Filmex
- Distributed by: Alameda Films
- Release date: 15 September 1953
- Running time: 95 minutes
- Country: Mexico
- Language: Spanish

Nobody Dies Twice (Spanish: Nadie muere dos veces) is a 1953 Mexican thriller film directed by Luis Spota and starring Abel Salazar, Luis Aguilar and Lilia del Valle.

== Cast ==
- Abel Salazar as Raúl García / Ricardo
- Luis Aguilar as Alberto
- Lilia del Valle as Irma
- Ramón Gay as Arturo Robles
- Pedro Vargas as Cantante
- Fernando Fernández as Fernando
- Enedina Díaz de León as Enedina
- Salvador Quiroz as Don Antonio

== Bibliography ==
- María Luisa Amador. Cartelera cinematográfica, 1950-1959. UNAM, 1985.
