= The Three Happy Friends =

1952 film

- Directed by: Tito Davison
- Written by: Julio Alejandro; Jesús Cárdenas; Tito Davison
- Produced by: Óscar J. Brooks; Felipe Mier
- Starring: Amalia Aguilar; Lilia Prado; Lilia del Valle
- Cinematography: Raúl Martínez Solares
- Edited by: Carlos Savage
- Music by: Manuel Esperón
- Production companies: Producciones Mier & Brooks
- Distributed by: Clasa-Mohme
- Release date: 22 August 1952
- Running time: 113 minutes
- Country: Mexico
- Language: Spanish

The Three Happy Friends (Spanish: Las tres alegres comadres) is a 1952 Mexican musical comedy film directed by Tito Davison and starring Amalia Aguilar, Lilia Prado and Lilia del Valle. It is an autoparody of the film released the same year, The Three Happy Compadres, and it was followed by a sequel filmed in 1953, My Three Merry Widows. It was shot at the Churubusco Studios in Mexico City. The film's sets were designed by the art director José Rodríguez Granada.

== Synopsis ==
After their attempts to break into filmmaking or nightclub performances in Mexico City, three young woman break up with their boyfriends and form a trio to tour the country.

== Cast ==
- Amalia Aguilar as Marina Bermúdez
- Lilia Prado as Estela González
- Lilia del Valle as Perla Martínez
- Joaquín Cordero as Alberto
- Wolf Ruvinskis as Tranquilino
- Tito Novaro as Rafael
- Juan García as El norteño
- Gloria Mestre as La Montalvo
- Jesús Valero as Director pelicula
- Diana Ochoa as Casera
- Juan Orraca as Hombre en accidente carro
- Manuel Trejo Morales as Comandante falso
- Pepe Ruiz Vélez as Galán en pelicula
- Georgina González as Sirvienta mansión
- Elena Julián as Sirvienta mansión
- Roberto Font as Chavito

== Bibliography ==
- Agrasánchez, Rogelio. Carteles de la época de oro del cine mexicano. Archivo Fílmico Agrasánchez, 1997.
- Riera, Emilio García. Historia documental del cine mexicano: 1951-1952. Universidad de Guadalajara, 1992.
- Wilt, David E. The Mexican Filmography, 1916 through 2001. McFarland, 2024.
