= Los dineros del diablo =

1953 film by Alejandro Galindo

- Directed by: Alejandro Galindo
- Written by: Alejandro Galindo; Carlos Villatoro
- Produced by: Joseph Noriega; José Othón Posada
- Starring: Amalia Aguilar; Roberto Cañedo; Víctor Parra
- Cinematography: Agustín Jiménez
- Music by: Ayrtón Amorín; Ary Macedo
- Distributed by: Producciones Noriega
- Release date: September 11, 1953 (Mexico)
- Running time: 85 min
- Country: Mexico
- Language: Spanish

Los dineros del diablo (The Devil's Money) is a Mexican drama film directed by Alejandro Galindo. It was released in 1953 and starring Amalia Aguilar and Roberto Cañedo.

== Plot ==
Manuel (Roberto Cañedo), a worker in a textile factory, meets accidentally Estrella (Amalia Aguilar), a rumba dancer. Manuel suffers for money and Estrella offers her help. After the death of his father and the need for money for his funeral, Manuel seeks Estrella, that puts him in touch with El Gitano (Victor Parra), a gangster who invites Manuel to join his band. With his help, El Gitano steal the factory where Manuel worked. The police stopped the boss of Manuel (father of the girl that he likes), but then they discover that Manuel is guilty. He flees and takes refuge with El Gitano and his band. In a showdown, Manuel tries to kill El Gitano. When the police arrive to arrest Manuel repents and on crutches, he was transferred in train to a prison.

== Cast ==
- Amalia Aguilar ... Estrella
- Roberto Cañedo ... Manuel Olea
- Víctor Parra ... El Gitano
- Arturo Soto Rangel ... Don Teodoro
- Prudencia Grifell ... Mrs. Olea

== Reviews ==
After the success of the film A Family Like Many Others (1948), the filmmaker Alejandro Galindo and the actor David Silva had, separately, a tight work agenda. This somehow prevented that David starred Los dineros del diablo, a slum thriller that was finished starred by Roberto Cañedo and Victor Parra in the role of the villain.
