= Lola de la Torre =

Canarian musician and pioneer of musicology in the Canary Islands

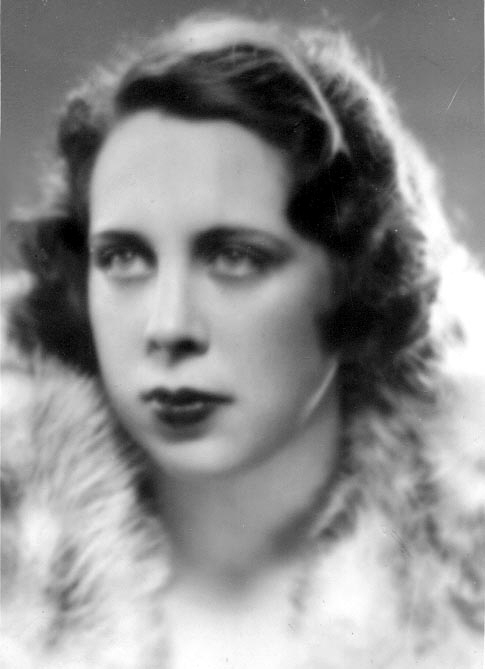
- Born: Dolores de la Torre Champsaur; September 25, 1902; Las Palmas de Gran Canaria
- Died: February 19, 1998 (aged 95); Las Palmas de Gran Canaria
- Occupation: Musicologist

Dolores de la Torre Champsaur, better known as Lola de la Torre, (born 1902, Las Palmas de Gran Canaria) was a Canarian musician and pioneer of musicology in the Canary Islands.

== Early life ==
Lola de la Torre was born on September 25, 1902, in Las Palmas de Gran Canaria. She was the daughter of the baritone Néstor de la Torre Comminges and Dolores Champsaur Millares.

She attended school on the island of Tenerife where her parents lived until 1918, and at the age of ten began studying the piano under Antonio Bonnin Fuster.

== Career ==
Shortly after finishing school, in 1920, de la Torre moved with her family to Havana where she developed a music career. In 1921, she sang at the premiere of El Caminante by Eduardo Sánchez de Fuentes, directed by the author at the Gran Teatro de La Habana. She also performed with Joaquín Turina and Beniamino Gigli and took part in Nueva Música directed by Alejo Carpentier.

In 1930 she returned to Tenerife and began working as a singing teacher, but later moved to Madrid to undertake musical study, gaining the First Prize for Song. In 1932 she worked on ancient Spanish music at the Centre for Historical Studies under the direction of Eduardo Martínez Torner.

During the Civil War, she taught music at national schools of Catalonia, specifically for the school of Hospitalet de Llobregat. She returned to the Canary Islands at the end of the war, but left with her husband and daughter for Havana in 1949 and Madrid in 1952. Once back in Las Palmas in 1954, she took an active role in music promotion and founded Las Palmas de las Juventudes Musicalales Internacional in 1956. She taught at the University of La Laguna in Puerto de la Cruz and, in 1975, she was appointed Professor of Singing at Las Palmas Conservatory of Music, a post she held until her retirement.

In 1957, she started her greatest work, an analysis of the archives of Las Palmas Cathedral. She created a catalogue of more than two thousand works, and collated a record of the history of music in the Cathedral from the sixteenth to the nineteenth century. This task lasted for more than thirty years, and created a large archive, now deposited in the Canarian Museum. At the same time, she collected a vast archive of information on Canarian composers, scores and numerous documents of musical note from the islands. These formed the foundation for the Musicology Department of the Canarian Museum, founded by Lothar Siemens Hernandez.

== Family life ==
Lola de la Torre married the intellectual Juan Manuel Trujillo Torres in Madrid in 1933. She died on February 19, 1998, in Las Palmas.

== Publications ==
- 1963: Study on the baroque composer Sebastián Durón, in the magazine El Museo Canario
- 1964–65: El Archivo Musical de la Catedral de Las Palmas (The Musical Archive of Las Palmas Cathedral) in the magazine El Museo Canario
- 1979: La capilla de música de la Catedral de Las Palmas (The Music Chapel of Las Palmas Cathedral), in Historia general de las Islas Canarias (General History of the Canary Islands), Las Palmas of Gran Canaria: Edirca.
- 1980: Noticias sobre el compositor Eugenio Domínguez Guillén (1822-1846) (Notes on the composer Eugenio Domínguez Guillén (1822-1846)), Santa Cruz de Tenerife: Cabildo Insular.
- 1983: La capilla de música de la Catedral de Las Palmass, 1514-1600: Documentos para su estudio (Music in Las Palmas Cathedral, 1514-1600: Documents for Study), Madrid: Spanish Society of Sociology.

== Awards and honours ==
- 125th Anniversary Literary Cabinet Prize, for her investigation of illuminated music in Gran Canaria (1969)
- Viera y Clavijo literary prize for her work Noticias sobre Diego Durón Maestro de Capilla de la Catedral de Las Palmas (Notes on Diego Durón Chapel Master of the Cathedral of Las Palmas) (1969)
- Favorite daughter of Las Palmas de Gran Canaria and Silver Medal (1983)
- Gold Medal of the Government of the Canary Islands (1993)
- Partner of Merit of the Friends of the Country Economic Society
- Partner of honor of the Circle of Fine Arts of Santa Cruz de Tenerife
- Partner of honor of the Philharmonic Society of Las Palmas
- Partner of honor of The Canarian Museum

En el barrio de La Galera de Las Palmas de Gran Canaria, una calle lleva su nombre. Calle Lola de La Torre (Musicóloga).
