= La China poblana (1944 film) =

1944 Mexican film

- Directed by: Fernando A. Palacios
- Written by: Fernando A. Palacios
- Produced by: Luis Sánchez Tello
- Starring: María Félix; Miguel Ángel Ferriz; Tito Novaro; José Goula; Miguel Inclán
- Cinematography: Raúl Martínez Solares
- Production company: Clasa Films Mundiales
- Distributed by: Clasa-Mohme (United States; 1944)
- Release date: 8 April 1944 (Mexico)
- Running time: 92 minutes
- Country: Mexico
- Language: Español

La China Poblana is a 1944 Mexican drama film, directed and written by Fernando A. Palacios. The film stars María Félix, Miguel Ángel Ferriz, Tito Novaro, José Goula, y Miguel Inclán.

== Plot ==
Frances Erskine discovers a silk tunic that according to legend is cursed. She wears it with the objective to defy the curse and demonstrate the curse does not exist. However, as she begins to discover more about the tunic's history, she learns it belongs to an imprisoned Chinese princess.

== Cast ==
- María Félix as Frances Erskine
- Miguel Ángel Ferriz as Miguel Sosa
- Tito Novaro as Alonso de Córdoba
- José Goula as Ángel Calderón de la Barca
- Miguel Inclán as El Pitarras

=== Supporting cast ===
- Gloria Iturbe
- Antonio R. Frausto
- Eugenia Galindo
- Estela Ametler
- Tony Díaz
- Enrique Uthoff
- Leopoldo Azcárate
- Ángel Di Stefani
- Maruja Grifell
- María Marcos

== Production ==
Filming took place on August 1943.

== Release ==
La China poblana had its film release on April 8, 1944, at the theater, Lindavista, in Mexico City.

== Critical reception ==
According to María Félix, the film's leading lady, the move was "dreadful" and a "total failure," adding: "I made it repay a favor, but this film made no sense whatsoever, even though it was shot in spectacular color and the costumes were in excellent taste." By that favor, Félix was referring to the fact that Fernando A. Palacios, the film's director, had discovered her and been her patron.

== Preservation ==
On March 24, 1982, the only existing copy of the film was burned in a fire at the Cineteca Nacional.

With no other surviving copy of this production known to exist, it is considered a lost film, of which only still photographs and a few promotional posters remain. In 2011, the film archives of UNAM published a list of lost Mexican films it was searching for, which included La China poblana. Eight years later, in 2019 the Fundación María Félix joined the search for the film, looking into Cuba, where a copy supposedly existed, but it was unable to locate one.
