= The Guests of the Marquesa =

1951 film

- Directed by: Jaime Salvador
- Written by: José Ramírez; Jaime Salvador
- Produced by: Carlos de León; Gustavo de León
- Starring: Carlota Solares; Amalia Aguilar; Ramón Armengod
- Cinematography: José Ortiz Ramos
- Edited by: Juan José Marino
- Music by: Nacho García
- Release date: 10 October 1951
- Running time: 94 minutes
- Country: Mexico
- Language: Spanish

The Guests of the Marquesa (Spanish: Los huéspedes de La Marquesa) is a 1951 Mexican musical comedy drama film directed by Jaime Salvador and starring Carlota Solares, Amalia Aguilar and Ramón Armengod. The film's sets were designed by the art director Ramón Rodríguez Granada. It is also known by the alternative title Qué rico el mambo.

== Cast ==
- Carlota Solares as La Marquesa
- Amalia Aguilar as Lilia
- Ramón Armengod as Ramón
- Pedro D'Aguillón as Aguillón
- Joaquín García Vargas as Borolas
- Manuel Noriega as Mayordomo
- José Jasso «El Ojón» as Jasso
- Lily Aclemar
- Víctor Alcocer
- Armida Bracho
- Antonio Bribiesca
- Eduardo Contreras
- Pancho Córdova
- Felipe de Flores
- Nacho García
- Prudencia Grifell
- Pepe Hernández
- José Alfredo Jiménez
- Marichu Labra
- Blanquita Montenegro
- Américo Montero
- José Ortiz de Zárate
- Luis Manuel Pelayo
- Josefina de la Peña
- María Teresa Piana
- Guillermo Portillo Acosta
- Rebeca Ríos
- Juan Bruno Tarraza
- Polo Villa
- Burdette Zea

== Bibliography ==
- Riera, Emilio García. Historia documental del cine mexicano: 1951-1952. Universidad de Guadalajara, 1992.
- Wilt, David E. The Mexican Filmography, 1916 through 2001. McFarland, 2024.
