= Ramón Armengod =

Mexican singer and actor

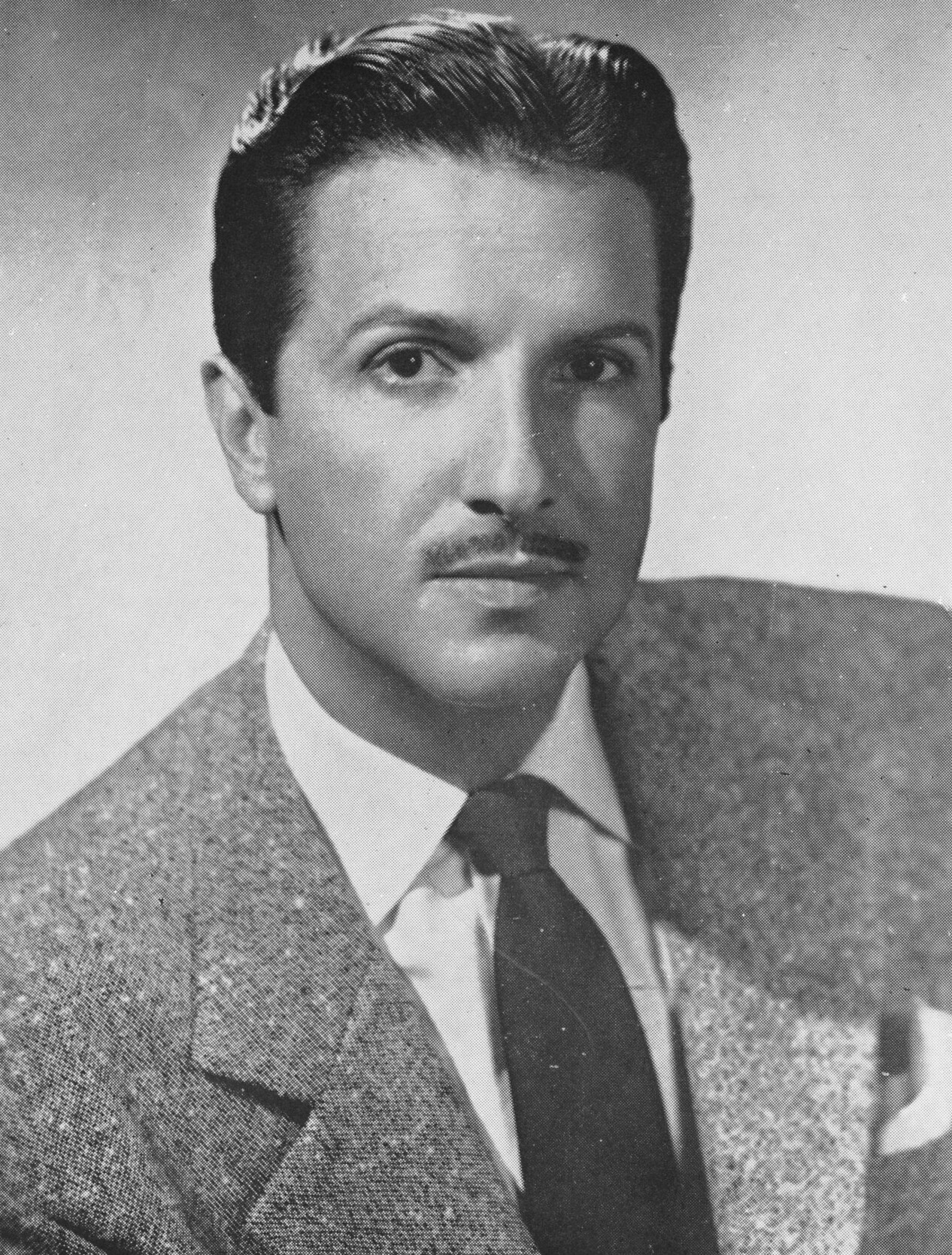
- Ramón Armengod in 1954
- Born: 10 October 1909; Veracruz, Mexico
- Died: 31 October 1976 (aged 67); Chilpancingo, Mexico
- Occupations: Actor, singer
- Years active: 1930–1975 (film)

Ramón Armengod (1909–1976) was a Mexican singer and film actor. He starred in a number of films during the Golden Age of Mexican Cinema.

== Selected filmography ==
- I Will Live Again (1940)
- A Macabre Legacy (1940)
- The League of Songs (1941)
- Summer Hotel (1944)
- Murder in the Studios (1946)
- Pervertida (1946)
- Caribbean Enchantment (1947)
- Jalisco Fair (1948)
- The Last Night (1948)
- It's a Sin to Be Poor (1950)
- Port of Temptation (1951)
- The Guests of the Marquesa (1951)
- Victims of Divorce (1951)
- Good Night, My Love (1951)
- When You Come Back to Me (1953)

== Bibliography ==
- Irwin, Robert & Ricalde, Maricruz. Global Mexican Cinema: Its Golden Age. British Film Institute, 2013.
- Soister, John T. & Nicolella, Henry. Down from the Attic: Rare Thrillers of the Silent Era through the 1950s. McFarland, 2016.
- Wood, Andrew Grant. Agustin Lara: A Cultural Biography. OUP, 2014.
