= Tito Novaro =

Mexican actor and film director

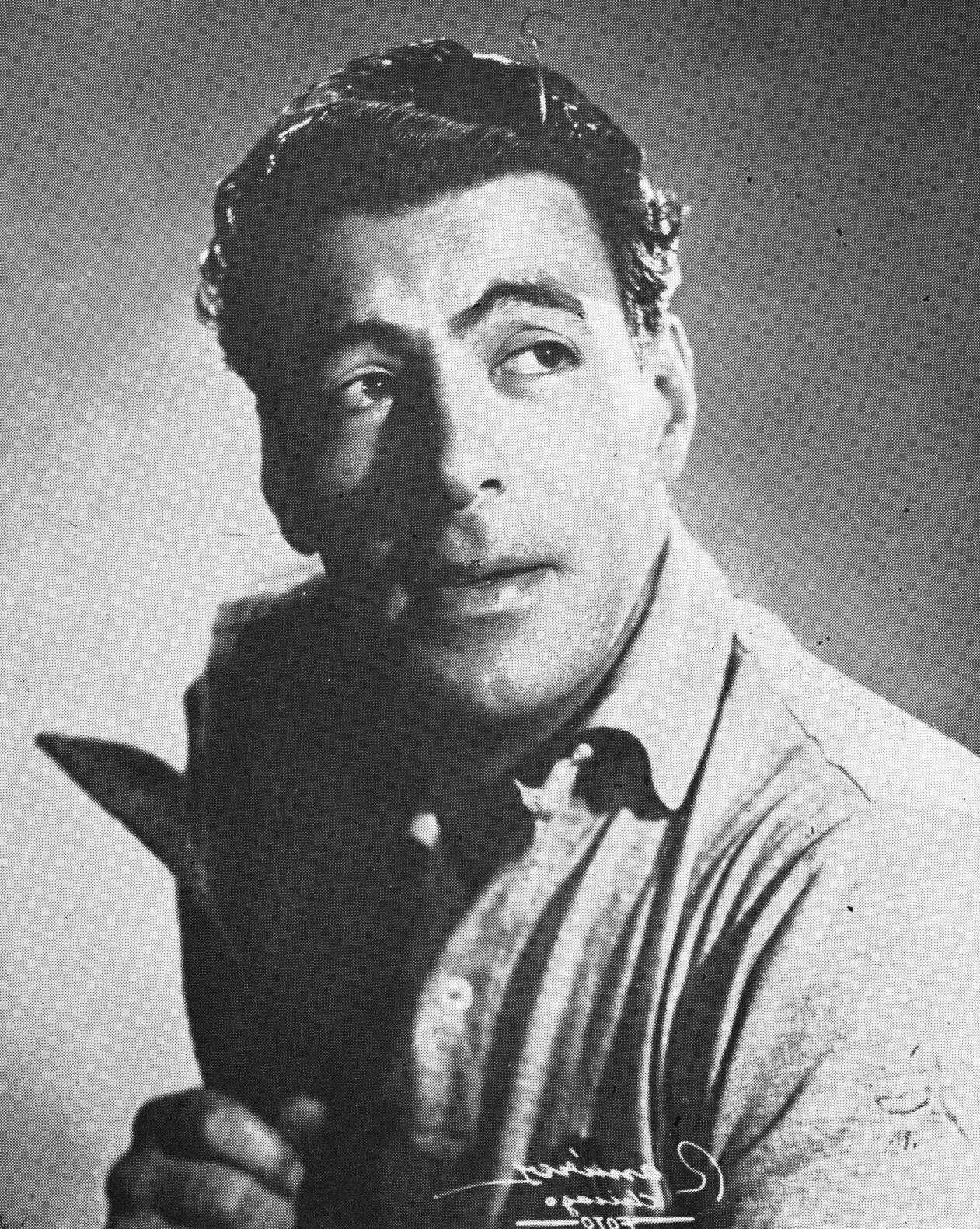
- Tito Novaro in 1954
- Born: 1 August 1918; Mexico City, Mexico
- Died: 14 April 1986 (aged 67); Mexico City, Mexico
- Occupations: Actor, film director
- Years active: 1936–1986 (film)

Tito Novaro (1918–1986) was a Mexican actor and film director. He began his career in the Golden Age of Mexican Cinema.

== Selected filmography ==
- Borrasca humana (1940)
- Wild Flower (1943)
- The Circus (1943)
- Santa (1943)
- La China poblana (1944)
- I Will Never Leave You (1948)
- Lost Love (1951)
- Kill Me Because I'm Dying! (1951)
- The Three Happy Friends (1952)
- The Wolf Returns (1952)
- El derecho de nacer (1952)
- The Children of Maria Morales (1952)
- Chucho the Mended (1952)
- Las locuras de Tin-Tan (1952)
- The Three Happy Compadres (1952)
- The Loving Women (1953)
- Remember to Live (1953)
- Four Hours Before His Death (1953)
- The Unknown Mariachi (1953)
- My Three Merry Widows (1953)
- Tres citas con el destino (1954)
- Drop the Curtain (1955)
- Cupido pierde a Paquita (1955)
- Magdalena (1955)
- The Soldiers of Pancho Villa (1959)
- El dolor de pagar la renta (1960)
- The White Renegade (1960)
- Chucho el Roto (1960)
- Los astronautas (1964)
- Caballo prieto azabache (1968)
- Apolinar (1971)
- The Incredible Invasion (1971)

== Bibliography ==
- Noble, Andrea. Mexican National Cinema. Routledge, 2005.
- Wilt, David E. The Mexican Filmography, 1916 through 2001. McFarland, 2024.
