= María Gentil Arcos =

Spanish-Mexican actress (1905–1965)

- Born: 11 April 1905; Valencia, Spain
- Died: 18 July 1965 (aged 60); Mexico City, Mexico
- Other names: Ma. Gentil Arcos; María G. Arcos
- Occupation: Actress

María Gentil Arcos (11 April 1905 – 18 July 1965) was a Spanish-Mexican actress of the Golden Age of Mexican cinema as a character actress in supporting roles.

She was the sister of Conchita Gentil Arcos, also an actress in the Golden Age of Mexican cinema; María began her work as an actress in 1938, while Conchita had already started her career in 1932. Among her characters stand out the mute and paralyzed mother of Pepe el Toro (Pedro Infante) who dies from the beating given by Miguel Inclán's character in Nosotros los Pobres (1948), and as the determined mother of Kid Terranova (David Silva) in Champion Without a Crown (1946).

The writer Carlos Monsiváis referred to her (alongside her sister María) as one of the "complementary faces" of Mexican cinema, writing, "After all, they are not many, but their years on the screen make them a tribe..."

== Selected filmography ==
- Cinco fueron escogidos (1943)
- Saint Francis of Assisi (1944)
- La Mujer sin Alma (1944)
- The Intruder (1944)
- Adultery (1945)
- Twilight (1945)
- The White Monk (1945)
- Lo que va de ayer a hoy (1945)
- Champion Without a Crown (1946)
- The Queen of the Tropics (1946)
- Love Makes Them Crazy (1946)
- The Tiger of Jalisco (1947)
- Sucedió en Jalisco (Los cristeros) (1947)
- Nosotros los Pobres (1948)
- A Family Like Many Others (1949)
- The Magician (1949)
- Rough But Respectable (1949)
- The Lady of the Veil (1949)
- Las tandas del principal (1949)
- Philip of Jesus (1949)
- Hypocrite (1949)
- Canta y no llores... (1949)
- La liga de las muchachas (1950)
- Another Spring (1950)
- The Dangerous Age (1950)
- Veracruz Passion (1950)
- Doctor on Call (1950)
- The Doorman (1950)
- Aventurera (1950)
- Traces of the Past (1950)
- A Galician Dances the Mambo (1951)
- The Shrew (1951)
- Women's Prison (1951)
- The Atomic Fireman (1952)
- Paco the Elegant (1952)
- Sister Alegría (1952)
- Private Secretary (1952)
- A Divorce (1953)
- Hotel Room (1953)
- Eugenia Grandet (1953)
- The Last Round (1953)
- Northern Border (1953)
- What Can Not Be Forgiven (1953)
- When I Leave (1954)
- The Three Elenas (1954)
- Romance de fieras (1954)
- Los Fernández de Peralvillo (1954)
- ...Y mañana serán mujeres (1955)
- Father Against Son (1955)
- Spring in the Heart (1956)
- El gran premio (1958)
- Ruletero a toda marcha (1962)

== Bibliography ==
- RA (2000). "Gentil Arcos, Conchita". Época de Oro del cine mexicano de la A a la Z. Vol. 11. Somos.
- Monsiváis, Carlos (1999). "Rostros Complementarios". Rostros del Cine Mexicano (Third ed.). Américo Arte Editores, S. A. de C. V. ISBN 968-5059-06-3.
