= Lost (1950 film) =

1950 film by Fernando A. Rivero

- Directed by: Fernando A. Rivero
- Written by: José Revueltas; Fernando A. Rivero; Carlos Sampelayo
- Produced by: Guillermo Calderón; José Luis Calderón; Pedro A. Calderón
- Starring: Ninón Sevilla; Agustín Lara; Domingo Soler
- Cinematography: Alex Phillips
- Edited by: Alfredo Rosas Priego
- Music by: Antonio Díaz Conde
- Production company: Producciones Calderón
- Release date: 3 June 1950
- Running time: 91 minutes
- Country: Mexico
- Language: Spanish

Lost (Spanish: Perdida) is a 1950 Mexican drama film directed by Fernando A. Rivero and starring Ninón Sevilla, Agustín Lara and Domingo Soler. The film's sets were designed by the art director José Rodríguez Granada.

== Cast ==
- Ninón Sevilla as Rosario Gómez / Norma
- Agustín Lara as Agustín
- Domingo Soler as Don Pascual
- Florencio Castelló as Matias
- César del Campo as Armando
- Maruja Grifell as La Turca
- Miguel Manzano as Sobrino Turca
- Jorge Mondragón as Comandante
- Guillermo Bravo Sosa as Padrastro
- Amalia Cristerna
- Linda Rey]
- Antonio Velázquez as Antonio
- Victorio Blanco as Espectador toros
- Lupe Carriles as Raymunda, ama de llaves
- Roberto Cobo
- Roberto Morales
- Luis Mussot as Escritor
- José Muñoz as Licenciado
- Dámaso Pérez Prado
- Matilde Sánchez as Cantante
- Pedro Vargas as Cantante

== Bibliography ==
- Andrew Grant Wood. Agustin Lara: A Cultural Biography. OUP USA, 2014.
