= The Loving Women =

1953 film by Fernando Cortés

- Directed by: Fernando Cortés
- Written by: Ernesto Cortázar; Fernando Cortés; Fernando Galiana; Carlos Sampelayo; Alfredo Varela
- Produced by: Óscar J. Brooks; Felipe Mier
- Starring: Amalia Aguilar; Lilia del Valle; Silvia Pinal
- Cinematography: José Ortiz Ramos
- Edited by: Carlos Savage
- Music by: Manuel Esperón
- Production company: Mier y Brooks
- Release date: 19 November 1953
- Running time: 95 minutes
- Country: Mexico
- Language: Spanish

The Loving Women (Spanish: Las cariñosas) is a 1953 Mexican comedy film directed by Fernando Cortés and starring Amalia Aguilar, Lilia del Valle and Silvia Pinal.

== Cast ==
- Amalia Aguilar as Laura
- Lilia del Valle as Lola
- Silvia Pinal as Carmen Santibañes
- Víctor Junco as Fernando Mendoza
- Sara Guasch as Fifi
- Tito Novaro as Pedro
- Felipe de Alba as Fernando Mendoza hijo
- José Pidal as Baldomero, mayordomo
- Alfredo Varela as Alberto Covarrubias
- Nicolás Rodríguez as Doctor Castrillón
- Marion del Valle as Lulu
- Consuelo Pastor as Lily
- Armando Acosta as Espectador
- Norma Ancira
- Armando Arriola as Auditor tren
- Magda Donato as Enfermera
- Rafael Icardo as Comisario
- Pompín Iglesias as Botones
- Carlos Martínez Baena
- Manuel Noriega as Paciente viejito
- Carlos Robles Gil as Espectador
- Humberto Rodríguez as Paciente
- Alfonso Torres
- Manuel 'Loco' Valdés as Bailarin

== Bibliography ==
- María Luisa Amador. Cartelera cinematográfica, 1950-1959. UNAM, 1985.
