= I Will Never Leave You (film) =

1948 film

- Directed by: Francisco Elías
- Starring: Anita Blanch; Tito Novaro; Guillermo Núñez Keith
- Release date: 29 April 1948
- Country: Mexico
- Language: Spanish

I Will Never Leave You (Spanish: No te dejaré nunca) is a 1948 Mexican drama film directed by Francisco Elías and starring Anita Blanch, Tito Novaro and Guillermo Núñez Keith.

== Cast ==
- Anita Blanch as Maria Magdalena Marcy
- Tito Novaro as Mauricio Lafont
- Guillermo Núñez Keith as Victor Augusto Bretonnel
- Pilar Sen
- Norma Ancira
- Margarita Maris
- Hector Alcantara
- Roger López
- Enrique del Castillo
- Octavio Luzart
- Leon Levine
- Carlos Cabrera
- Daniel Tellez Wood

== Bibliography ==
- Riera, Emilio García. Historia documental del cine mexicano: 1946-1948. Universidad de Guadalajara, 1992.
- Wilt, David E. The Mexican Filmography, 1916 through 2001. McFarland, 2024.
