= Paco the Elegant =

1952 film

- Directed by: Adolfo Fernández Bustamante
- Written by: Adolfo Fernández Bustamante; Paulino Masip
- Produced by: Fernando de Fuentes
- Starring: Antonio Badú; Emilia Guiú; Carlos Cores
- Cinematography: Jorge Stahl Jr.
- Edited by: José W. Bustos
- Music by: Gonzalo Curiel
- Production company: Producciones Dyana
- Distributed by: Azteca Films
- Release date: 3 January 1952
- Running time: 87 minutes
- Country: Mexico
- Language: Spanish

Paco the Elegant (Spanish: Paco, el elegante) is a 1952 Mexican crime film directed by Adolfo Fernández Bustamante and starring Antonio Badú, Emilia Guiú and Carlos Cores. It was produced by Fernando de Fuentes. It was shot at the Tepeyac Studios in Mexico City. The film's sets were designed by the art director Javier Torres Torija.

== Cast ==
- Antonio Badú as Paco Robledo, Paco el Elegante
- Emilia Guiú as Beatriz Camargo
- Carlos Cores as Miguel Labra
- Ramón Gay as Ramon Colmenares, Novelas
- Esperanza Issa as Anita Conde
- José G. Cruz as Chapo
- Pascual García Peña as Gordo
- Armando Sáenz as Pepe
- Fernando Galiana as Luis Camargo
- Jaime Jiménez Pons as Chamaco
- Eva Garza as Cantante
- Lupe Carriles as Portera, casa de Luis
- María Gentil Arcos as Tia Consuelo

== Bibliography ==
- Amador, María Luisa. Cartelera cinematográfica, 1950-1959. UNAM, 1985.
- Hershfield, Joanne & Maciel, David. Mexico's Cinema: A Century of Film and Filmmakers. Rowman & Littlefield Publishers, 1999.
