= Pervertida =

- Directed by: José Díaz Morales
- Produced by: Guillermo Calderón
- Starring: Emilia Guiú; Ramón Armengod; Amalia Aguilar
- Music by: Agustín Lara
- Release date: September 13, 1946 (Mexico)
- Running time: 93 min
- Country: Mexico
- Language: Spanish

Pervertida (Perverted Woman) is a 1946 Mexican drama film directed by José Díaz Morales, starring Emilia Guiú, Ramón Armengod and Amalia Aguilar. The film is inspired by the bolero of the same name composed by Agustin Lara.

== Plot ==
By irreparable events of the destiny, Elena (Emilia Guiú) a provincial young, ends up falling into the clutches of perdition and prostitution in Mexico City. The woman reunited with her true love, a musician named Fernando (Ramon Armengod) who has returned to find her. The woman will have to compete for his love with the rumbera Esmeralda (Amalia Aguilar).

== Cast ==
- Emilia Guiú ... Elena
- Ramón Armengod ... Fernando
- Amalia Aguilar ... Esmeralda
- Víctor Manuel Mendoza
- Fanny Schiller
- Kiko Mendive

== Reviews ==
This film was produced by the brothers Guillermo and Pedro Arturo Calderón, experts in tales of "perdition". The film was the presentation in the Mexican Cinema of the Cuban rumbera Amalia Aguilar. In the film, Amalia Aguilar shows her great talent for dancing in a choreographic solo called ¿Donde va María? alongside Kiko Mendive.
