= The Last Round (1953 film) =

1953 film by Alejandro Galindo

- Directed by: Alejandro Galindo
- Written by: Alejandro Galindo; Pascual García Peña; Ricardo Rangel
- Produced by: Sidney T. Bruckner
- Starring: Emilia Guiú; José María Linares-Rivas; Domingo Soler
- Cinematography: Jorge Stahl Jr.
- Edited by: Carlos Savage
- Music by: José de la Vega
- Production company: Producciones Espada
- Release date: 23 September 1953
- Running time: 96 minutes
- Country: Mexico
- Language: Spanish

The Last Round (Spanish: El último Round) is a 1953 Mexican sports drama film directed by Alejandro Galindo and starring Emilia Guiú, José María Linares-Rivas and Domingo Soler. The film's sets were designed by the art director Gunther Gerszo.

== Cast ==
- Emilia Guiú as Olga
- José María Linares-Rivas as Rafael Suárez
- Domingo Soler as Fernando
- Carlos Valadez as Julio Torres
- Lupe Llaca as Lupita
- José Pulido as Lugarteniente de Suárez
- María Gentil Arcos as Tía de Lupita
- Francisco Reiguera as Reynoso
- Lupita Alday as Silvia
- Gloria Mestre as Bailarina
- Bruno Márquez as Maitre'd
- Manuel Casanueva as Entrenador
- Arturo Castro 'Bigotón' as Comisario
- Miguel Funes hijo as Niño transeúnte
- Agustín de la Lanza as Niño asistente de Julio
- Manuel Luévano as Boxeador
- Carmen Manzano as Mamá transeúnte
- Héctor Mateos as Doctor
- Lucio Moreno as Boxeador
- Pedro Ortega El Jaibo
- Ignacio Peón as Amante viejo de olga
- Ray Pérez as Boxeador
- Julio Sotelo as Locutor boxeo
- Salvador Terroba as Esbirro de Suárez
- Tommy Vargas as Boxeador
- Carlos Robles Gil as Reportero

== Bibliography ==
- María Luisa Amador. Cartelera cinematográfica, 1950-1959. UNAM, 1985.
