= Sucedió en La Habana =

- Directed by: Ramon Peon
- Written by: Ramón Pérez Díaz; Agustín Rodríguez
- Produced by: Antonio Perdices for Películas Cubanas, S.A.
- Starring: Luana Alcañiz; Juan Torena; Rita Montaner; Carlos Orellana; Alberto Garrido; Federico Piñero; Enriqueta Sierra; Julito Díaz
- Cinematography: Agustín P. Delgado; Eduardo Fernández
- Edited by: Martin G. Cohn
- Music by: Gonzalo Roig
- Distributed by: Republic Pictures of Cuba, S.A.
- Release date: July 6, 1938
- Running time: 113 minutes
- Country: Cuba
- Language: Spanish

Sucedió en La Habana ("It Happened in Havana") is a 1938 Cuban film directed by Ramon Peon. It stars Luana Alcañiz (as Luana de Alcañiz), Juan Torena, Rita Montaner and Carlos Orellana. It was one of the most successful and ambitious Cuban films during the 1930s. The film is a combination of music, romance and comedy, in which a Cuban young woman falls in love with an engineer working in her father's sugar mill, with many funny scenes provided by comedians Garrido and Piñero, and musical interludes featuring artists as the Havana Casino Orchestra, the Milanés Sisters, Ignacio Piñeiro's Septet, Guyún, and singers María de los Ángeles Santana and Margot Alvariño.
