= Gloria Ríos =

American singer and actress

- Born: December 17, 1928; Sweetwater, Texas, United States
- Died: March 2, 2002 (aged 73); San Antonio, Texas, United States
- Occupations: Actress, singer
- Years active: 1947–1959 (film)

Gloria Ríos (1928–2002) was an American singer and actress who enjoyed success in Mexico. She starred in several films during the Golden Age of Mexican Cinema during the 1940s and 1950s. She was a pioneer of Rock and roll in the country.

== Selected filmography ==
- Voices of Spring (1947)
- The Game Rooster (1948)
- A Decent Woman (1950)
- Port of Temptation (1951)
- Good Night, My Love (1951)
- La locura del rock and roll (1957)
- Muertos de miedo (1958)

== Bibliography ==
- Sturman, Janet. The Course of Mexican Music. Routledge, 2015.
- Vargas, Deborah R. Dissonant Divas in Chicana Music: The Limits of la Onda. U of Minnesota Press, 2012.
