= Fernando A. Rivero =

Mexican film director

- Born: 9 February 1908; Mexico City, Mexico
- Died: 20 April 1972 (aged 64); Mexico City, Mexico
- Occupations: Film director, screenwriter, art director
- Years active: 1932–1953 (film)

Fernando A. Rivero (1908–1972) was a Mexican film director and screenwriter active during the Golden Age of Mexican Cinema. Early in his career he also worked as an art director designing film sets.

== Selected filmography ==
- Gold and Silver (1934)
- Perjura (1938)
- Beautiful Mexico (1938)
- Les Misérables (1943)
- Marina (1945)
- Nosotros (1945)
- The Prince of the Desert (1947)
- Coqueta (1949)
- The Bewitched House (1949)
- It's a Sin to Be Poor (1950)
- Lost (1950)
- Good Night, My Love (1951)
- The Lovers (1951)
- Beauty Salon (1951)
- The Night Is Ours (1952)
- Victims of Divorce (1952)
- The Strange Passenger (1953)

== Bibliography ==
- Pilcher, Jeffrey M. Cantinflas and the Chaos of Mexican Modernity. Rowman & Littlefield, 2001.
- Wood, Andrew Grant. Agustin Lara: A Cultural Biography. OUP, 2014.
