= César del Campo =

Cuban actor

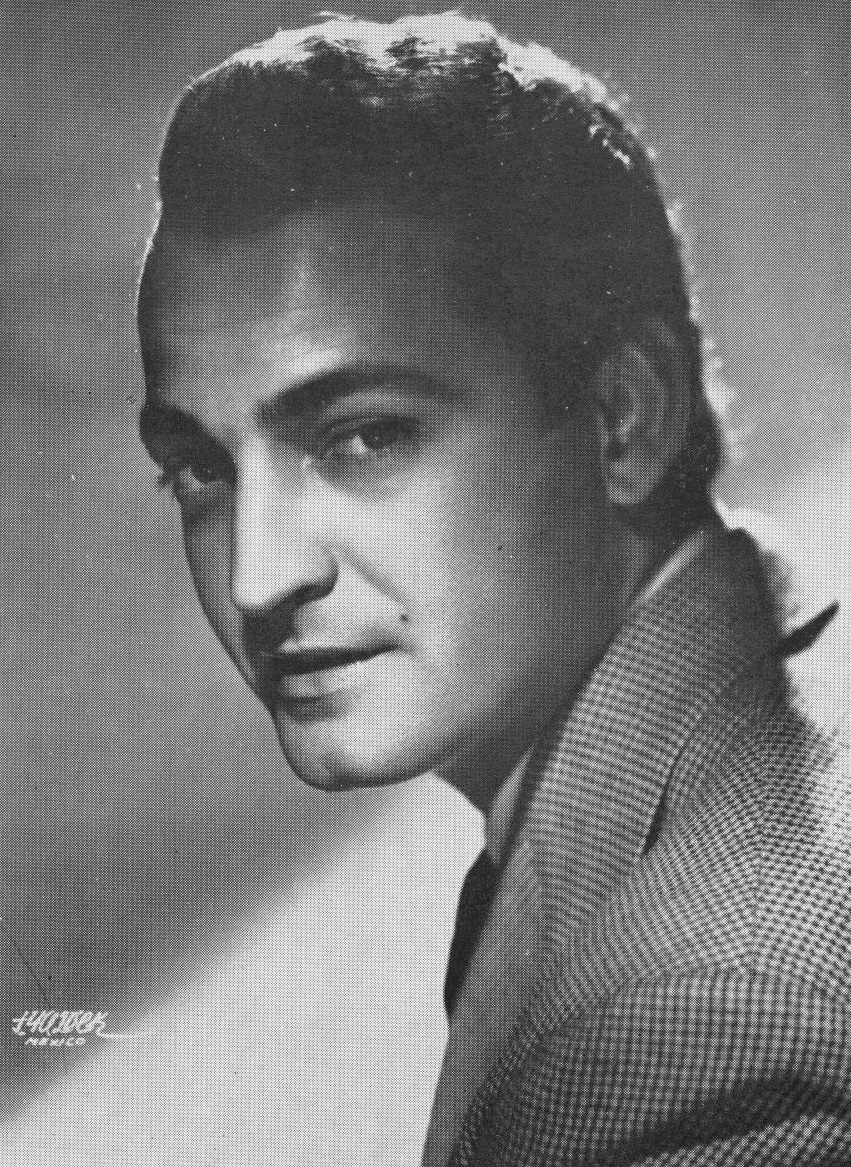
- César del Campo in 1954
- Born: 9 May 1922; Havana, Cuba
- Died: 15 April 2008 (aged 85); Homestead, Florida, United States
- Occupation: Actor
- Years active: 1948–1981 (film)

César del Campo (1922–2008) was a Cuban film actor.

== Selected filmography ==
- The Last Night (1948)
- Lola Casanova (1949)
- Confessions of a Taxi Driver (1949)
- Lost (1950)
- I Don't Deny My Past (1952)
- The Night Is Ours (1952)
- The Bandits of Cold River (1956)
- The Empire of Dracula (1967)

== Bibliography ==
- Cotter, Bob. The Mexican Masked Wrestler and Monster Filmography. McFarland & Company, 2005.
