= To the Sound of the Mambo =

1950 film by Chano Urueta

- Directed by: Chano Urueta
- Written by: Pedro Galindo; Antonio Guzmán Aguilera
- Produced by: Pedro Galindo
- Starring: Adalberto Martínez «Resortes» Amalia Aguilar; Rita Montaner
- Cinematography: Agustín Jiménez
- Edited by: Jorge Bustos
- Music by: Jorge Perez
- Production company: Filmadora Chapultepec
- Release date: October 7, 1950 (México)
- Running time: 89 minutes
- Country: Mexico
- Language: Spanish

To the Sound of the Mambo (Spanish: Al son del mambo) is a 1950 Mexican musical film directed by Chano Urueta and starring Adalberto Martínez «Resortes», Amalia Aguilar and Rita Montaner. The film's sets were designed by the art director Ramón Rodríguez Granada. It was shot at the Churubusco Studios in Mexico City and on location in Havana. It was produced as a Rumberas film, a genre popular during the Golden Age of Mexican Cinema.

== Plot ==
Don Chonito Godinez (Adalberto Martínez), the wealthy owner of a business of Mexican enchiladas, flees Mexico to escape to the modern life and tries to find comfort in Havana. Don Chonito is convinced by a restoring called Maria La O (Amparo Arozamena) for days at a resort in the country. There, he coincides with his sister (Esther Luquín), a depressed American woman (Joan Page), a composer (Roberto Romagna) and two detectives (Joaquín García "Borolas" and Mario Garcia "Harapos"), which should give him some very important information. Under the administration of the Cuban singer Rita Montaner, and with songs and dances provided by her daughter Reyna (Amalia Aguilar), the estate which houses the complex, is a kind of cabaret that works all day. So the owners and all his friends (including the "King of Mambo" Damaso Perez Prado with full orchestra), Don Chonito decide to enjoy himself, doing nothing.

== Cast ==
- Adalberto Martínez «Resortes» as Don Chon Godinez
- Amalia Aguilar as Reyna
- Roberto Romaña as Roberto Dávila
- Rita Montaner as Rita
- Amparo Arozamena as María La O
- Esther Luquin as Linda
- Joaquín García "Borolas"
- Mario García "Harapos"
- Anabel Gutiérrez
- Joan Page
- Nacho Contla
- Damaso Perez Prado
- Juan Bruno Tarraza
- Dolly Sisters
- Beny Moré
- Los Tres Diamantes
- Pedro Galindo Galarza
- Chucho Martínez Gil
- Chelo La Rue & ballet
- Alberto Domínguez
- Yeyo

== Reviews ==
The music of the Cuba Damaso Perez Prado could not go unnoticed in the Mexican cinema of the 1950s. Chano Urueta was the director responsible for this musical revue with a minimal plot. In which Roberto Romagna served as presenter, and starring eccentric comedian Adalberto Martínez "Resortes". The film is a document of great value for the musical rhythms of those days, with numbers of great artists like Rita Montaner and Perez Prado and the singer Pedro Galindo with mariachis, pianist Juan Bruno Tarraza and many others. Besides the music of Perez Prado, he performed as an actor. Onscreen presences include Amalia Aguilar, Joan Page, the voluptuous Dolly Sisters, and the young rising star Anabel Gutiérrez.

== Bibliography ==
- Riera, Emilio García. Historia documental del cine mexicano: 1949. Ediciones Era, 1969.
- Wilt, David E. The Mexican Filmography, 1916 through 2001. McFarland, 2024.
