= Elisa Christy =

Mexican actress and dancer (1917–2018)

- Born: Elisa Crochet Asperó; 30 September 1917; Mexico City, Mexico
- Died: 26 May 2018 (aged 100)
- Occupations: Actress, dancer
- Spouse: Jorge Negrete (m. 1940; div. 1942)

Elisa Christy (born Elisa Crochet Asperó, 30 September 1917 – 26 May 2018) was a Mexican actress and dancer.

== Career ==
Christy was involved in movies "La Valentina" in 1938, "Juntos, pero no revueltos" ("Together But Not Mixed") in 1939, and "La Viuda Celosa" in 1946.

== Personal life and death ==
Christy was the daughter of actress Elisa Asperó and Spanish actor Julio Villarreal (Julio Crochet).

Christy married musician and actor Jorge Negrete. She gave birth to their only child, Diana Negrete. They divorced in 1942, after which Christy remarried. She died on 26 May 2018, at the age of 100.

== Selected filmography ==
- Lola Casanova (1949)
