= Eduardo Sánchez de Fuentes =

Cuban composer (1874–1944)

"Tu—Habanera (To You!—A Song of Havana)" (1911)
A 1911 recording of Tú, Sánchez de Fuentes' best known work, by Alma Gluck and the Victor Orchestra for Victor Records.

Eduardo Sánchez de Fuentes (3 April 1874, in Havana – 7 September 1944) was a Cuban composer, and an author of books on the history of Cuban folk music. He was an Officer of the French Legion of Honour.

The outstanding habanera Tú, written when he was sixteen, was his best-known composition. As an adult, he composed the scores for the opera Yumurí, the ballet Dioné, the oratorio Navidad and the cantata Anacaona.

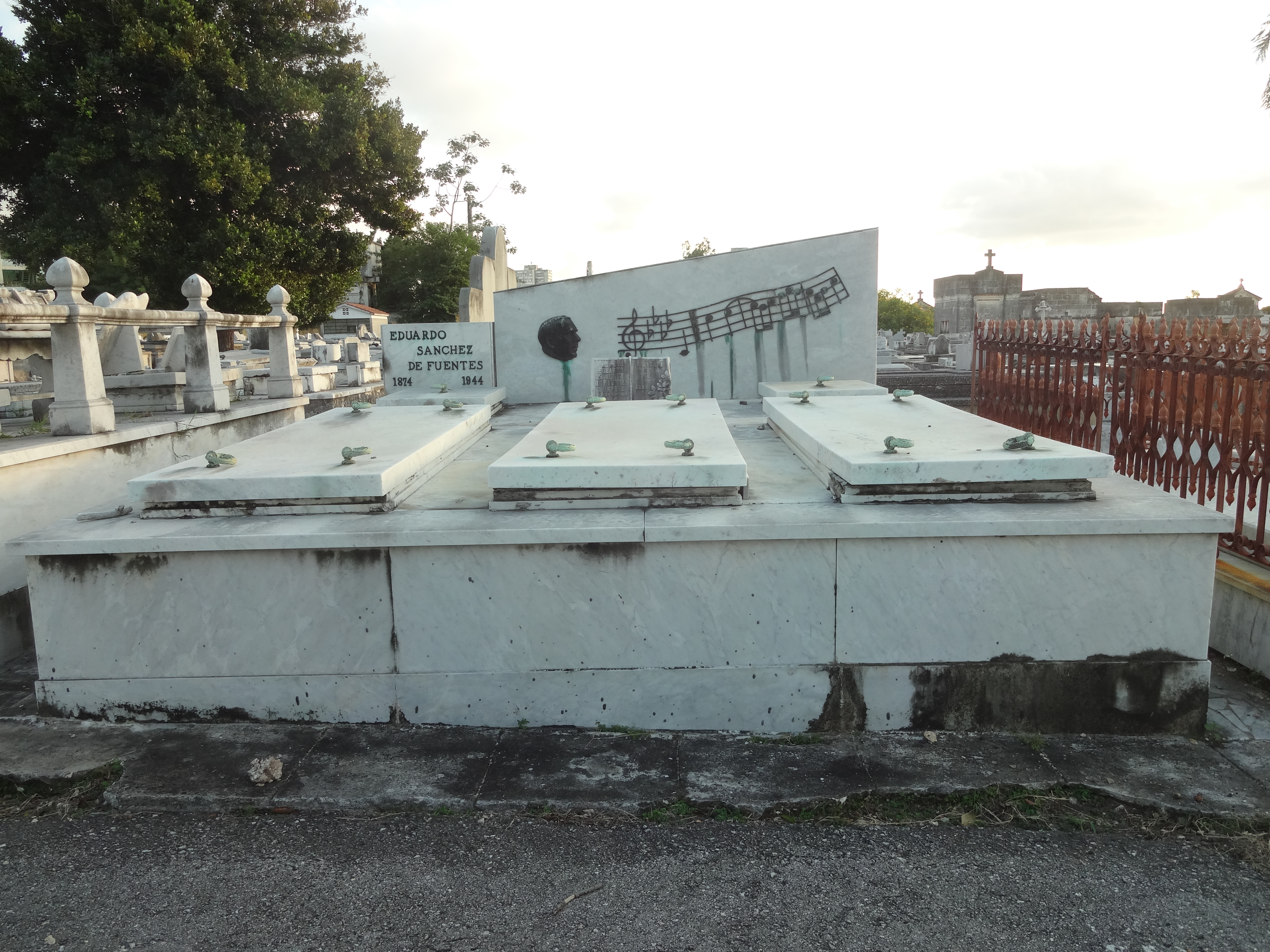
Grave

His writings are still charming and informative today, though their standing has suffered from an accurate criticism by later musicologists. They realized that he had systematically underestimated the contribution of the Africans in Cuba. He insisted, instead, on the supposed contribution of Cuba's original aboriginal population, which was subsequently disproved.

"It is a shame that a succession of errors should have spoilt the greatest work of a man who had carried his musicianship for almost half a century with rare dignity. Because in the end...Sanchez de Fuentes will remain, above all, a composer of habaneras and songs. In a hundred years his Cuban melodies will occupy a place of honor in our traditions..."

== Bibliography ==
- El folklore en la música cubana
- Cuba y sus músicos
- Influencia de los ritmos africanos en nuestro cancionero
- La contradanza y la habanera
- Ignacio Cervantes
- Consideraciones sobre la música cubana
- Viejos ritmos cubanos
- La última firma de Brindis de Sala
- La música aborigen de América
- Foklorismo
