= Emilia Guiú =

Spanish-Mexican actress

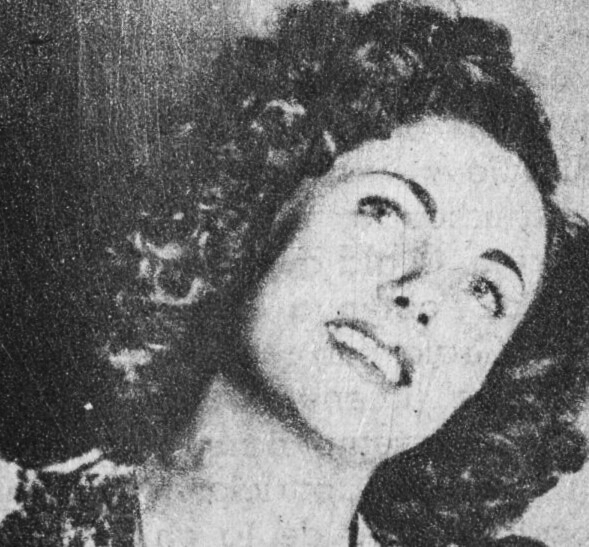
- Emilia Guiú in 1945
- Born: Emilia Guiú Estivella; 21 March 1922; Manresa (Barcelona), Spain
- Died: 7 February 2004 (aged 81); San Diego, California
- Years active: 1943–2000

Emilia Guiú Estivella (March 21, 1922 – February 7, 2004) was a Spanish actress who appeared mainly in Mexican films, particularly in the 1940s and 1950s in the Golden Age of Mexican cinema. She made over 60 film appearances between 1943 and 2000 and typically played villain roles and "femme fatale". She also made a number of theatrical appearances.

== Career ==
Guiu left Spain with her family, during the Spanish Civil War. In 1943 she moved to Mexico and shortly after arriving, she discovered that a Spanish film director needed migrants as hired extras. This brought about her debut role in Flor silvestre (1943). In 1944 she had a small role in Roberto Rodríguez's comedy, ¡Viva mi desgracia! as a jailer woman at the fair and further smaller roles that year including El abanico de Lady Windermere, under the helm of Juan José Ortega and Fernando Fuentes's El rey se divierte. Her first leading role came in 1945 in the musical drama film Club verde, directed by Raphael J. Sevilla, in which she starred opposite Emilio Tuero and Celia Montalván. In 1961 she appeared in Confidencias matrimoniales, which would be her last performance on screen for 22 years as she moved into theatrical acting. She returned to the cinema in 1983, in the film Las modelos de desnudos.

Guiú made her last performance in the Mexican telenovela Abrázame muy fuerte in 2000. She died on February 7, 2004, in San Diego, California, from cancer.

== Filmography ==
- Wild Flower (1943)
- The Rebel (1943)
- ¡Viva mi desgracia!(1944)
- El Herrero (1944)
- La vida inútil de Pito Pérez (1944)
- Nana (1944)
- El Rosario (1944)
- El médico de las locas (1944)
- El abanico de Lady Windermere(1944)
- El Rey se divierte (1944)
- Nosotros (1945)
- Club verde (En México, Recuerdo de un Vals) (1945)
- I Am a Fugitive (1946)
- Amar es vivir (1946)
- Pervertida (1946)
- Nuestros maridos (1946)
- Mujer contra mujer (1946)
- Bel Ami (1947)
- The Lost Child (1947)
- Pecadora (1947)
- La mujer del otro (1948)
- Matrimonio sintético (1948)
- Enrédate y verás (1948)
- Little Black Angels (1948)
- Peace (1949)
- Carta Brava (1949)
- Dos almas en el mundo (1949)
- Mujeres en mi vida (1950)
- Quinto patio (1950)
- Traces of the Past (1950)
- Furia roja (1951)
- Una viuda sin sostén (1951)
- Good Night, My Love (1951)
- The Lovers (1951)
- Monte de piedad (1951)
- Port of Temptation (1951)
- Radio Patrol (1951)
- Women of the Theatre (1951)
- Paco the Elegant (1952)
- Victims of Divorce (1952)
- The Night Is Ours (1952)
- Vive como sea (1952)
- Prefiero a tu papá (1952)
- ¡Amor, qué malo eres! (1953)
- The Strange Passenger (1953)
- El último round (1953)
- Angels of the Street (1953)
- Píntame angelitos blancos (1954)
- Solamente una vez (1954)
- Sindicato de telemirones (1954)
- De ranchero a empresario (1954)
- Maternidad imposible (1955)
- Ladrones de niños (1958)
- Mujeres encantadoras (1958)
- Señoritas (1959)
- Siete pecados (1959)
- Pancho villa y la Valentina (1960)
- Confidencias matrimoniales (1961)
- Las modelos de desnudos (1983)
- Cacería de un criminal (1984)
- Corrupción (1984)
- Siempre en domingo (1984)
- Abrázame muy fuerte (Serie de televisión) (2000)
