= List of Mexican films of 1947 =

Mexican films released in 1947

This is a list of the films produced in Mexico in 1947, ordered alphabetically (see 1947 in film):

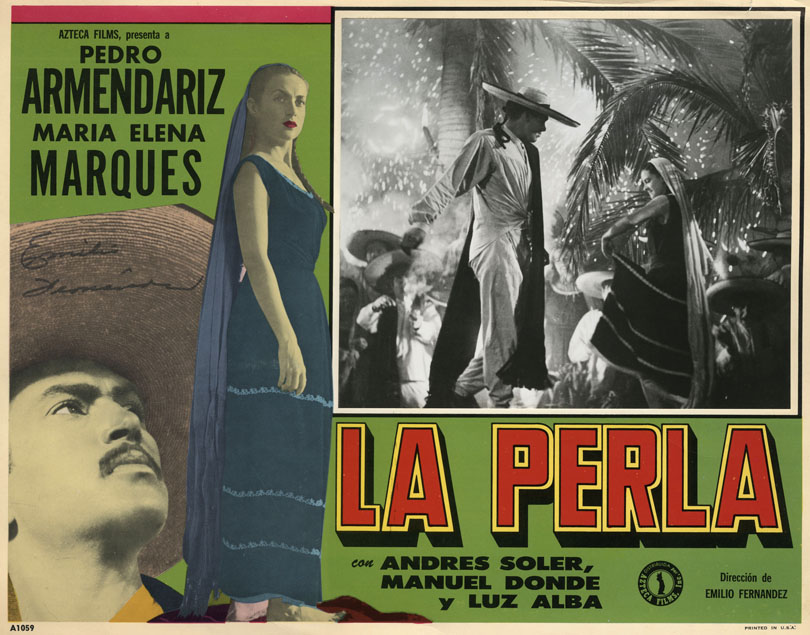
Poster for The Pearl directed by Emilio Fernández.

== 1947 ==
Title	Director	Cast	Genre	Notes
1947
Arsène Lupin	Ramón Peón	Ramón Pereda, Adriana Lamar, Juan Pulido	Mystery	
Bel-Amí	Antonio Momplet	Armando Calvo, Gloria Marín, Andrea Palma	Drama	
Caribbean Enchantment	Juan Orol	María Antonieta Pons, Ramón Armengod, Blanquita Amaro	Musical	
Chachita from Triana	Ismael Rodríguez	Evita Muñoz, Carlos Martínez Baena, René Cardona	Comedy drama	
El conquistador	Fernando Soler	Marquita Rivera		
Don't Marry My Wife	Fernando Cortés	Mapy Cortés, José Cibrián, Antonio Badú	Comedy	
Ecija's Seven Children	Miguel Morayta	Julián Soler, Rosario Granados, Luis Beristáin	Historical	
Felipe Was Unfortunate	René Cardona	Antonio Badú, Meche Barba, Fernando Soto	Comedy	
The Garcias Return	Ismael Rodríguez	Pedro Infante, Abel Salazar, Marga López	Comedy	
The Golden Boat	Joaquín Pardavé	Sofía Álvarez, Pedro Infante and Carlos Orellana	Comedy drama	
Gran Casino	Luis Buñuel	Libertad Lamarque, Jorge Negrete, Meche Barba	Drama	First Buñuel's Mexican film
A Gypsy in Jalisco	José Díaz Morales	Paquita de Ronda, Ángel Garasa, Felipe de Alba	Comedy	
I Am a Charro of Rancho Grande	Joaquín Pardavé	Sofía Álvarez, Pedro Infante, René Cardona	Musical comedy	
If I'm to Be Killed Tomorrow	Miguel Zacarías	Sofía Álvarez, Pedro Infante, René Cardona	Comedy	
The Kneeling Goddess	Roberto Gavaldón	María Félix, Arturo de Córdova, Rosario Granados	Drama	
The Lost Child	Humberto Gómez Landero	Tin Tan, Emilia Guiú, Marcelo Chávez	Comedy	
The Pearl	Emilio Fernández	Pedro Armendáriz, María Elena Marqués	Drama	Based on The Pearl by John Steinbeck
The Prince of the Desert	Fernando A. Rivero	Abel Salazar, Malú Gatica, René Cardona	Adventure	
The Private Life of Mark Antony and Cleopatra	Roberto Gavaldón	María Antonieta Pons, Luis Sandrini, Víctor Junco	Comedy	
The Secret of Juan Palomo	Miguel Morayta	Julián Soler, Rosario Granados, Luis Beristáin	Historical	
Soledad	Miguel Zacarías	Libertad Lamarque, René Cardona, Marga López	Drama	
Strange Appointment	Gilberto Martínez Solares	Esther Fernández, Luis Aldás, Jorge Reyes	Mystery thriller	
Strange Obsession	José Díaz Morales	Antonio Badú, Malú Gatica, Alejandro Ciangherotti	Drama	
The Three Garcias	Ismael Rodríguez	Pedro Infante, Abel Salazar, Marga López	Comedy	
The Tiger of Jalisco	René Cardona	Armando Soto La Marina, Delia Magana, Manolo Fábregas	Western comedy	
Voices of Spring	Jaime Salvador	Domingo Soler, Delia Magaña, Adalberto Martínez	Comedy	
¡A volar joven!	Miguel M. Delgado	Cantinflas, Miroslava, Ángel Garasa, Andrés Soler		
You Have the Eyes of a Deadly Woman	Ramón Peón	Ramón Pereda, Adriana Lamar, Luana Alcañiz	Comedy	
Five Faces of Woman	Gilberto Martínez Solares	Arturo de Córdova, Pepita Serrador, Ana María Campoy		
Music Inside	Humberto Gómez Landero	Germán Valdés, Tin-Tan, Marga López		
Sucedió en Jalisco (Los cristeros)	Raúl de Anda	Sara García		
The Strange Woman	Miguel M. Delgado	Roberto Silva, Alicia Barrié, Andrés Soler		
The Thief	Julio Bracho	Luis Sandrini, Domingo Soler, Elsa Aguirre		
