= List of Mexican films of 1946 =

A list of the films produced in Mexico in 1946, ordered alphabetically (see 1946 in film):

== 1946 ==
Title	Director	Cast	Genre	Notes
1946
Boom in the Moon	Jaime Salvador	Buster Keaton, Angel Garasa		
Campeón sin corona	Alejandro Galindo	David Silva, Amanda del Llano		
Caribbean Rose	José Benavides	María Elena Marqués, Víctor Junco, Katy Jurado	Drama	
The Devourer	Fernando de Fuentes	María Félix, Luis Aldás, Julio Villarreal	Film noir	
Enamorada	Emilio Fernández	María Félix, Pedro Armendáriz		
Hay muertos que no hacen ruido	Humberto Gómez Landero	Tin Tan, Marcelo Chávez, Amanda del Llano		
Humo en los Ojos	Alberto Gout	Meche Barba, David Silva		First Rumberas film massive production
It's Not Enough to Be a Charro	Juan Bustillo Oro	Jorge Negrete, Lilia Michel, Eugenia Galindo	Comedy	
Love Makes Them Crazy	Fernando Cortés	Mapy Cortés, Rafael Baledón, Nelly Montiel	Comedy	
María Magdalena	Miguel Contreras Torres	Medea de Novara, Luis Alcoriza, Tito Junco, José Baviera	Religious drama	
La mujer de todos	Julio Bracho	María Félix, Armando Calvo	Drama	
The Operetta Queen	José Benavides	Fernando Soler, Sofía Álvarez and Joaquín Pardavé	Musical drama	
La Otra	Roberto Gavaldón	Dolores del Río, Víctor Junco		
El Pasajero Diez Mil				
Pepita Jiménez	Emilio Fernández	Rosita Díaz Gimeno, Ricardo Montalban, Fortunio Bonanova	Drama	
Pervertída	Rolando Aguilar	Emilia Guiú, Amalia Aguilar		
The Queen of the Tropics	Raúl de Anda	María Antonieta Pons, Luis Aguilar, Fernando Soto	Drama	
The Road to Sacramento	Chano Urueta	Jorge Negrete, María Elena Marqués, Julio Villarreal	Adventure	
The Stronger Sex	Emilio Gómez Muriel	Mapy Cortés, Rafael Baledón, Ángel Garasa	Comedy	
Soy un profugo	Miguel M. Delgado	Cantinflas, Emilia Guiú, Carmelita González, Daniel "Chino" Herrera, José Eliás Moreno, Estanislao Schillinsky		
En tiempos de la Inquisición	Juan B. Oro	Jorge Negrete, Gloria Marín		
A Woman of the East	Juan Orol	Rosa Carmina, Carlos López Moctezuma, Carlos Badías	Thriller	
Cantaclaro	Julio Bracho	Esther Fernández, Antonio Badú, Alberto Galán		
Crimen en la alcoba	Emilio Gómez Muriel	Carlos Orellana		
Dizziness	Antonio Momplet	María Félix, Emilio Tuero, Lilia Michel		
El ahijado de la muerte	Norman Foster	Jorge Negrete, Rita Conde, Leopoldo Ortín		
El barchante Neguib	Joaquín Pardavé	Joaquín Pardavé, Sara García		
Esperanza	Fernando de Fuentes			
Madman and Vagabond	Carlos Orellana	Manuel Medel, Meche Barba, Manuel Arvide		
Mamá Inés		Sara García		
Murder in the Studios	Raphael J. Sevilla	David T. Bamberg, María de los Ángeles Santana, Ricardo Mondragon		
Ramona	Víctor Urruchúa	Esther Fernández, Antonio Badú		
Symphony of Life	Celestino Gorostiza		Musical	
The Associate	Roberto Gavaldón	Hugo del Carril, Gloria Marín, Nelly Montiel		
Tragic Wedding	Gilberto Martínez Solares	Roberto Silva, Miroslava, Ernesto Alonso		
¡Ay qué rechula es Puebla!	René Cardona	Antonio Badú, Sara García, Jorge Reyes		
