= Jesusita en Chihuahua (film) =

1942 film directed by René Cardona

- Directed by: René Cardona; Zacarías Gómez Urquiza
- Written by: René Cardona; Ernesto Cortázar
- Produced by: René Cardona; Jorge Vélez
- Starring: Susana Guízar; René Cardona; Pedro Infante
- Cinematography: Víctor Herrera
- Edited by: Mario del Río
- Music by: Manuel Esperón
- Release date: 1942
- Running time: 82 Minutes
- Country: Mexico
- Language: Spanish

Jesusita en Chihuahua is a 1942 film directed and written by René Cardona. Zacarías Gómez Urquiza was assistant director. Also starring in the film are Susana Guízar, René Cardona himself and it is Pedro Infante's first starring role. This film is the first that Infante is not only credited for singing, but he sings the title song "Jesusita en Chihuahua". In his previous film however, En un burro tres baturros, Infante was cast as an extra but collaborated by singing in place of Carlos López Moctezuma.

== Plot ==
Valentín Terrazas and Felipe González are candidates in an election for president in a fictional town in the state of Chihuahua that involves a shoot out between the two candidates, Valentín and Felipe. Valentín is injured in the shoot out, having been shot in the left arm and Jesusita, takes Valentín to the home of Tula Tulares de Tulancingo and Tula's daughter, Teresa Marroquín. Valentín wakes up with the three women standing near him, he is unhappy that Jesusita brought him to that particular house, but he's most unhappy that Teresa is engaged to be married to Felipe.

Valentín discovers that Macario has been sending flowers to Teresa in Valentín's name for several days without his knowledge which causes Teresa and her mother to visit Felipe's hacienda, where Jesusita lives and works. Teresa gives Jesusita a gown to wear at an upcoming party, and asks Jesusita why she doesn't dress like a woman and tells her she should dress more feminine or she'll never find a man. Jesusita rushes out of the room on the verge of tears. Before going in to dinner, Jesusita overhears Felipe tell Teresa and Tula that she should've been born a man because of the way she acts, but also says he envies her for her strength of character. He also says he doesn't think she will ever fall in love, and that's not who she is. Jesusita is again brought to tears, and while alone in her room decides to dress up for the party.

Felipe and Jesusita go to a canteen, another woman takes an interest in Felipe and wants to sit with them. Jesusita becomes jealous and eventually punches the woman, knocking her out. Later Felipe chastises Jesusita for her behavior and calls her a "butch" which causes her to cry. Felipe apologizes and she asks him not to call her that again.

Felipe goes to town to pay the municipal taxes for Tula, but the amount has tripled. Felipe confronts Valentín who tells him that he will waive the amount if Teresa agrees to marry him, otherwise Felipe has to pay it since he will be her husband. He also tells Felipe that it's going for a good cause, electricity, running water, schools and public parks, but Felipe is reluctant to pay it. Doña Tula pays Valentín a visit at his office, she asks him to lower the amount but he says the only remedy is that he become her son-in-law, or Teresa's future husband will have to pay it.

Valentín serenades outside Teresa's window, she appears but goes back inside before the song is done. Jesusita appears at the window and asks if he'll play a song for her, but Valentín tells her that he won't because she has the heart of a man, and the men all laugh. Jesusita is brought to tears again. Teresa tries to console her, saying that Jesusita cries like a woman just like her. Jesusita tells Teresa that she does love just like a woman, and she suffers because of it.

At the party Jesusita surprises everyone, she has transformed into a beautiful, elegant woman. Valentín crashes the party and sings to Teresa while Jesusita clings to Felipe's arm. Later he proposes to her but she asks him to leave. The next day Felipe tells Jesusita he plans to marry Teresa, and she runs out of the room. Felipe looks baffled. Valentín sends for Jesusita and proposes a deal in which they work together so that Jesusita can marry Felipe and he can marry Teresa.

Teresa is kidnapped and taken to a remote cabin, Valentín sings to her from outside to try to soften her heart. Felipe arrives to rescue Teresa and shoots Valentín with blanks that Jesusita has loaded in his gun. Valentín pretends to die, and Teresa tells him she loves him with all her soul. Valentín then reveals the ruse and tells Felipe that Jesusita is in love with him, which he didn't realize until then.

== Cast ==
- Susana Guízar as Jesusita
- René Cardona as Felipe González
- Pedro Infante as Valentín Terrazas
- Susana Cora as Teresa Marroquín
- Agustín Isunza as Macario
- Emma Roldán as Tula Tulares de Tulancingo
- Manuel Noriega Ruiz as Zenaido (as Manuel Noriega)
- Arturo Manrique as man in cantina (as Panseco)
- Rosalinda Rubio
- Jorge Treviño as man in cantina
- Julio Ahuet
