= Romeo and Juliet (1943 film) =

- Directed by: Miguel M. Delgado
- Written by: William Shakespeare (play); Jaime Salvador
- Produced by: Jacques Gelman; Santiago Reachi
- Starring: Mario Moreno «Cantinflas» María Elena Marqués; Ángel Garasa
- Cinematography: Jack Draper
- Edited by: Fernando Martínez
- Music by: Manuel Esperón
- Production company: Posa Films
- Release date: 3 September 1943
- Running time: 100 minutes
- Country: Mexico
- Language: Spanish

Romeo and Juliet (Spanish: Romeo y Julieta) is a 1943 Mexican comedy film directed by Miguel M. Delgado and starring Mario Moreno «Cantinflas», María Elena Marqués and Ángel Garasa. It is loosely based on William Shakespeare's tragedy Romeo and Juliet. The film's dialogue is in verse.

== Cast ==
- Mario Moreno as Cantinflas / Romeo
- María Elena Marqués as Julieta
- Ángel Garasa as Fray Lorenzo
- Andrés Soler as Capulet
- Emma Roldán as Lady Capulet
- José Baviera as Paris
- Pedro Elviro
- Guillermo Familiar
- Juan Garcia
- Conchita Gentil Arcos
- Rafael Icardo
- Maria de la Paz Jarero
- Tito Junco
- Manuel Noriega
- José Ortiz de Zárate
- Jorge Reyes
- Humberto Rodríguez
- Estanislao Shilinsky

== Bibliography ==
- Daniel Balderston, Mike Gonzalez & Ana M. Lopez. Encyclopedia of Contemporary Latin American and Caribbean Cultures. Routledge, 2002.
