= List of Mexican films of the 1940s =

This is a list of films produced in the Cinema of Mexico in the 1940s, ordered chronologically by year of release. For an alphabetical list of Mexican films, see Category:Mexican films.

== 1940 ==
- List of Mexican films of 1940

== 1941 ==
- List of Mexican films of 1941

== 1942 ==
- List of Mexican films of 1942

== 1943 ==
- List of Mexican films of 1943

== 1944 ==
- List of Mexican films of 1944

== 1945 ==
- List of Mexican films of 1945

== 1946 ==
- List of Mexican films of 1946

== 1947 ==
- List of Mexican films of 1947

== 1948 ==
- List of Mexican films of 1948

== 1949 ==
- List of Mexican films of 1949
