= My Memories of Mexico =

1944 film

- Directed by: Juan Bustillo Oro
- Written by: Juan Bustillo Oro
- Produced by: Gregorio Walerstein
- Starring: Fernando Soler; Sofía Álvarez; Joaquín Pardavé
- Cinematography: Jack Draper
- Edited by: Mario González
- Music by: Federico Ruiz
- Production company: Filmex
- Distributed by: Azteca Films
- Release date: 6 April 1944
- Running time: 91 minutes
- Country: Mexico
- Language: Spanish

My Memories of Mexico (Spanish: México de mis recuerdos) is a 1944 Mexican historical musical film directed as well as written by Juan Bustillo Oro and starring Fernando Soler, Sofía Álvarez, Joaquín Pardavé, Dolores Camarillo and Salvador Quiroz. The film nostalgically recreates the years of the Porfirio Díaz dictatorship in Mexico. It was shot at the Azteca Studios in Mexico City. The film's sets were designed by the art director Luis Moya.

== Cast ==
- Fernando Soler as Don Jesús Flores
- Sofía Álvarez as Rosario Medina
- Joaquín Pardavé as Don Susanito Peñafiel y Somellera
- Luis Aldás as Pablo Flores
- Antonio R. Frausto as Don Porfirio Díaz
- Tana as Adelina Roca
- Virginia Zurí as Doña Carmelita
- Mimí Derba as Tía Gertrudis
- Dolores Camarillo as Conchita, portera
- María Luisa Serrano as Tía Cuquita
- Conchita Gentil Arcos as Tía Blandina
- Salvador Quiroz as Coronel Zamudio
- Ricardo Mutio as Luis G. Urbina
- José Pidal as Amado Nervo
- Ernesto Monato as Ernesto Elorduy
- Manuel Noriega as Pancho, mayordomo
- Max Langler as Nicolás Zúñiga y Miranda
- Victoria Argota as Doña Rumalda Moriones
- Adelina Vehi as Doña Genara Moriones
- Valentín Asperó
- Alfredo Varela padre as Amigo de Chucho
- Alberto Michel
- Roberto Cañedo as Teniente González
- Lidia Franco as Invitada a fiesta
- Paco Martínez as Don Manuel
- Félix Medel as Pregonero
- Ignacio Peón as Mayordomo del presidente
- Manuel Pozos as Invitado a boda
- Alicia Reyna as Lola, criada de Adelina
- José Ignacio Rocha as Pregonero
- Humberto Rodríguez as Ramírez
- Aurora Ruiz as Petra, criada de Rosario
- Ramón Sánchez as Barrendero
- María Valdealde as Invitada que aplaude en boda
- David Valle González as Camarero
- Aurora Zermeño as Lucía, amiga de Adelina

== Bibliography ==
- Segre, Erica. Intersected Identities: Strategies of Visualisation in Nineteenth- and Twentieth-century Mexican Culture. Berghahn Books, 2007.
