= The Two Orphans (1944 film) =

- Directed by: José Benavides hijo
- Written by: Adolphe d'Ennery (play); Eugène Cormon (play); Elvira de la Mora; Adolfo Fernández Bustamante; José Benavides hijo
- Produced by: Gregorio Walerstein
- Starring: Susana Guízar; Julián Soler; María Elena Marqués
- Cinematography: Jack Draper
- Edited by: Mario González
- Music by: Federico Ruiz
- Production company: Cinematográfica Filmex
- Release date: 14 July 1944
- Running time: 125 minutes
- Country: Mexico
- Language: Spanish

The Two Orphans (Spanish:Las dos huérfanas) is a 1944 Mexican historical drama film directed by José Benavides hijo and starring Susana Guízar, Julián Soler and María Elena Marqués. It is an adaptation of the play The Two Orphans by Adolphe d'Ennery and Eugène Cormon, one of a large number of film versions that have been made.

== Cast ==
- Susana Guízar
- Julián Soler
- María Elena Marqués
- Anita Blanch
- Rafael Baledón
- Virginia Zurí
- Rafael Banquells
- Virginia Manzano
- Miguel Arenas
- Víctor Junco
- Manuel Noriega
- Lidia Franco
- María Luisa Serrano
- Ramón G. Larrea
- José Morcillo
- Victoria Argota
- Alma Riva

== Bibliography ==
- Alfred Charles Richard. Censorship and Hollywood's Hispanic image: an interpretive filmography, 1936-1955. Greenwood Press, 1993.
