= Pobre diablo =

Pobre diable may refer to:

- Pobre diablo (1940 film), 1940 Mexican film, also known by the English title Poor Devil
- "Pobre diablo" (song), Spanish language title of the song "Pauvres Diables" by Julio Iglesias
