= The Road to Sacramento =

1946 film

- Belgian poster
- Directed by: Chano Urueta
- Written by: Leopoldo Baeza y Aceves; Ernesto Cortázar; Tito Davison
- Produced by: Gregorio Walerstein
- Starring: Jorge Negrete; María Elena Marqués; Julio Villarreal
- Cinematography: Jack Draper
- Edited by: Mario González
- Music by: Rosalío Ramírez; Federico Ruiz
- Production company: Filmex
- Distributed by: Clasa-Mohme
- Release date: 2 May 1946
- Running time: 95 minutes
- Country: Mexico
- Language: Spanish

The Road to Sacramento (Spanish: Camino de Sacramento) is a 1946 Mexican adventure film directed by Chano Urueta and starring Jorge Negrete, Rosario Granados and Julio Villarreal, with the film debut of Carmelita González. It was shot at the Azteca Studios in Mexico City. The film's sets were designed by the art director Luis Moya.

== Synopsis ==
Two twin brothers Antonio and Juan Ruiz have been brought up separately, both believing the other is dead. Antonio becomes a famous bandit near Sacramento in California while Juan is a lawyer in Seville. One day the two meet by accident and join forces against the corrupt governor Enrique Ledesma, who murdered their father.

== Cast ==
- Jorge Negrete as Juan Ruiz / Antonio Ruiz
- Rosario Granados as Luisa
- Julio Villarreal as Don Enrique Ledesma
- Pepe Martínez as Curro
- Ernesto Cortázar as Ramón
- Carlos Múzquiz as El Chueco
- Eva Martino as Reyna
- Carmelita González as Señorita en baile
- Salvador Quiroz as Fray Servando
- Ramón Sánchez as Bandido
- Raquel Téllez Girón as Señora Castillo

== Bibliography ==
- Irwin, Robert & Ricalde, Maricruz. Global Mexican Cinema: Its Golden Age. British Film Institute, 2013.
- Riera, Emilio García. Historia documental del cine mexicano: 1943–1945. Universidad de Guadalajara, 1992.
- Sandoval, Carmen Barajas. Jorge Negrete. EDAMEX, 2001.
