= The Tiger of Jalisco =

1947 film

- Directed by: René Cardona
- Written by: Pablo Sánchez Mora; Paulino Masip; René Cardona
- Starring: Armando Soto La Marina; Delia Magana; Manolo Fábregas
- Cinematography: Víctor Herrera
- Edited by: José W. Bustos
- Music by: Manuel Esperón
- Production companies: Cinematográfica de Guadalajara; Producciónes Grovas
- Distributed by: Azteca Films
- Release date: 7 March 1947
- Running time: 90 minutes
- Country: Mexico
- Language: Spanish

The Tiger of Jalisco (Spanish: El tigre de Jalisco) is a 1947 Mexican western comedy film directed by René Cardona and starring Armando Soto La Marina, Delia Magana and Manolo Fábregas. It was shot at the Churubusco Studios in Mexico City. The film's sets were designed by the art director Vicente Petit.

== Synopsis ==
A mayor offers a reward to the capture of a notorious bandit, but the local hotel owner and others object as the outlaw brings in paying tourists to the town.

== Cast ==
- Armando Soto La Marina as León Bravo
- Delia Magaña as Cinda
- Manolo Fábregas as Eduardo
- Beatriz Aguirre as Rosita
- Luis G. Barreiro as Don Pancho
- Miguel Inclán as Tigre de Pedrero
- Alfonso Bedoya as Bandido
- Juan Pulido as Don Ruperto, señor alcalde
- Fanny Schiller as Tía de Mary, tourist
- Maria Stein as Mary, tourist
- Teté Casuso as Rita, actress
- Enrique Peña Franco
- Manuel Noriega as Puerta
- Julio Ahuet as Cantinero
- Guillermo Bravo Sosa as Don Matías
- José Escanero as Don Cenón
- Edmundo Espino as Señor juez
- María Gentil Arcos as Mamá de Eduardo
- Sara Montes as Mujer en restaurante
- José Muño as Inspector Ordóñez
- Ignacio Peón as Pueblerino
- Humberto Rodríguez as Pueblerino
- María Luisa Smith as Pueblerina

== Bibliography ==
- Agrasánchez, Rogelio. Mexican Movies in the United States: A History of the Films, Theaters, and Audiences, 1920-1960. McFarland, 2006.
