= Beatriz Ramos =

Mexican actress

- Born: 13 November 1914; Monterrey, Nuevo León, Mexico
- Died: 1 February 2000 (aged 85); Mexico City, Mexico
- Occupation: Actress
- Years active: 1932–1959 (film)
- Spouse: Albert Carrier (m. 1950, divorced)

Beatriz Ramos (13 November 1914 – 1 February 2000) was a Mexican film actress. She was active during the Golden Age of Mexican Cinema. She was married to the actor Albert Carrier.

== Selected filmography ==
- The Call of the Blood (1934)
- Gold and Silver (1934)
- The Mystery of the Ghastly Face (1935)
- The Associate (1946)
- Music, Poetry and Madness (1948)
- Marked Cards (1948)
- The Devil Is a Woman (1950)
- Engagement Ring (1951)
- History of a Heart (1951)
- Tropical Delirium (1952)
- Sister Alegría (1952)
- Sombrero (1953)
- La Calle de los amores (1954)
- The Rapture (1954)

== Bibliography ==
- Paranaguá, Paulo Antônio. Mexican Cinema. British Film Institute, 1995.
- Wilt, David E. The Mexican Filmography, 1916 through 2001. McFarland, 2024.
