= Mischievous Susana =

1945 film

- Directed by: Fernando Cortés
- Written by: Neftali Beltrán; Alfredo Varela; Fernando Cortés; Georges Berr (play Ma sœur et moi); Louis Verneuil (play Ma sœur et moi)
- Produced by: Gregorio Walerstein
- Starring: Mapy Cortés; Luis Aldás; Fortunio Bonanova
- Cinematography: Jack Draper
- Distributed by: Clasa-Mohme
- Release date: 31 May 1945
- Running time: 71 minutes
- Country: Mexico
- Language: Spanish

Mischievous Susana (Spanish: La pícara Susana) is a 1945 Mexican musical comedy film directed by Fernando Cortés and starring Mapy Cortés, Luis Aldás and Fortunio Bonanova.

This is Cortés's directorial debut; he directed his wife Mapy, who plays the lead role.

== Cast ==
- Mapy Cortés as Susana Martínez/ Lupe Rodríguez
- Luis Aldás as Miguel Ángel Pérez
- Fortunio Bonanova as Conde Mauricio Tonescu
- Fernando Cortés as Don Andrés Martínez Rico
- Alfredo Varela as Señor Badu
- Luis G. Barreiro as Sr. Ramón Filosel
- Virginia Manzano as Margarita
- José Pidal as Benjamín, butler
- Conchita Gentil Arcos as customer
- Consuelo Segarra as Sra. Pérez
- Paco Martínez as Sr. Pérez
- Pedro Elviro as waiter
- Fernando Del Valle
- José Arratia
- Jose Pastor
- Alfredo Varela padre as waiter
- Lidia Franco as homeowner
- Ana María Hernández as dinner guest
- Margarito Luna as drunk
- Félix Samper as dinner guest
- María Valdealde as Mujer transeúnte

== Bibliography ==
- Miluka Rivera. Legado puertorriqueño en Hollywood: famosos y olvidados. Lulu.com, 2010.
