= The Operetta Queen =

1946 film

- Directed by: José Benavides
- Written by: Joaquín Pardavé
- Produced by: Gregorio Walerstein
- Starring: Fernando Soler; Sofía Álvarez; Joaquín Pardavé
- Cinematography: Jack Draper
- Edited by: Mario González
- Music by: Rosalío Ramírez; Federico Ruiz
- Production company: Filmex
- Distributed by: Clasa-Mohme
- Release date: 10 January 1946
- Running time: 105 minutes
- Country: Mexico
- Language: Spanish

The Operetta Queen (Spanish: La reina de la opereta) is a 1946 Mexican musical drama film directed by José Benavides and starring Fernando Soler, Sofía Álvarez and Joaquín Pardavé. It was shot at the Azteca Studios in Mexico City. The film's sets were designed by the art director Luis Moya.

== Cast ==
- Fernando Soler as Don Pedro Rufo
- Sofía Álvarez as Blanca De La Fuente
- Joaquín Pardavé as Don Margarito Pimentel
- Luis Aldás as Mario Montes
- Dolores Camarillo as Nana Felisa
- Manuel Noriega as Don Luis De La Fuente
- Enrique García Álvarez as Padre de Mario
- Ramiro Gómez Kemp as Tenor
- Griselda Short as Blanquita niña
- Pastor Torres as Director de orquesta
- Carmelita González as Invitada fiesta

== Bibliography ==
- Paranaguá, Paulo Antonio. Mexican Cinema. British Film Institute, 1995.
- Riera, Emilio García. Historia documental del cine mexicano: 1943-1945. Universidad de Guadalajara, 1992.
