= The Mystery of the Ghastly Face =

1935 film

- Directed by: Juan Bustillo Oro
- Written by: Juan Bustillo Oro
- Produced by: José Alcayde; Alberto Monroy Cajiga
- Starring: Carlos Villarías; Beatriz Ramos; Manuel Noriega
- Cinematography: Agustín Jiménez
- Edited by: Juan Bustillo Oro
- Music by: Federico Ruiz
- Production company: Producciones Alcayde
- Distributed by: Cinexport Distributing
- Release date: 5 October 1935
- Running time: 88 minutes
- Country: Mexico
- Language: Spanish

The Mystery of the Ghastly Face (Spanish: El misterio del rostro pálido) is a 1935 Mexican mystery horror film directed by Juan Bustillo Oro and starring Carlos Villarías, Beatriz Ramos and Manuel Noriega. The film's sets were designed by the art director Carlos Toussaint. It is noted for its use of expressionism.

== Cast ==
- Carlos Villarías as Dr. Galdino Forti
- Beatriz Ramos as Angelica
- Natalia Ortiz as Dona Ingracia
- Manuel Noriega as Justo
- Joaquín Busquets as Pablo Forti
- René Cardona as Luis Montes
- Miguel Arenas as Dr, Julio Montes
- Abraham Galán as Cresencio
- José Cortés as Indio Viejo
- Carlos Aganza as Indio joven

== Bibliography ==
- Brill, Olaf (ed.) Expressionism in the Cinema. Edinburgh University Press, 2016.
- Soister, John T. & Nicolella, Henry. Down from the Attic: Rare Thrillers of the Silent Era through the 1950s. McFarland, 2016.
