= Marquita Rivera =

Puerto Rican musician and actress (1922–2002)

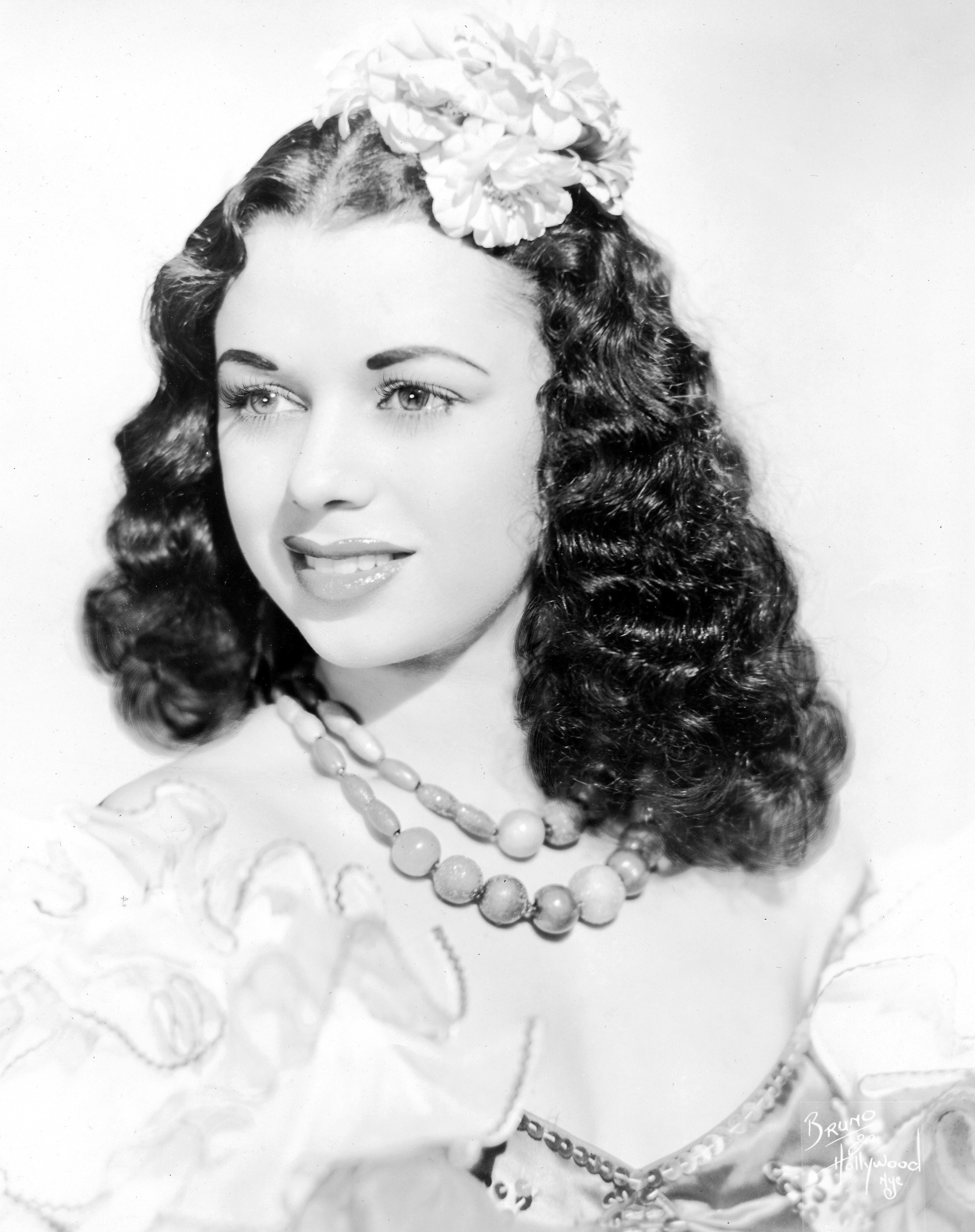
- Rivera in the 1940s
- Born: María Heroína Rivera de Santiago; May 18, 1922; Fajardo, Puerto Rico
- Died: October 21, 2002 (aged 80); Los Angeles, California, U.S.
- Occupations: Actress; dancer; comedian
- Years active: 1943–2002
- Spouses: Albert Vernon Ashbrook (m. 1946; div. 1949) Eugene N. Biscardi II (m. 1951; died 1980)
- Children: 7

Marquita Rivera (born María Heroína Rivera de Santiago; May 18, 1922 – October 21, 2002), a.k.a. "Queen of Latin Rhythm", was a Puerto Rican actress, singer, and dancer. She was given several nicknames including Flor de Borinquén, Reina de la Conga and Huracán del Caribe.

== Early life ==
Marquita Rivera was born in Fajardo, Puerto Rico to Jesús Rivera y Pérez and Clara de Santiago. She was the youngest in a family of twelve, one of five daughters and seven sons. In 1929, her mother moved her and six siblings to New York City, N.Y., as her father and the other children remained home in Puerto Rico. At six-years-old, Rivera originally studied dance and flamenco with Eduardo Cansino, Rita Hayworth's father, and Hayworth gave Rivera a set of castanets as a gift.

== Acting and singing career ==
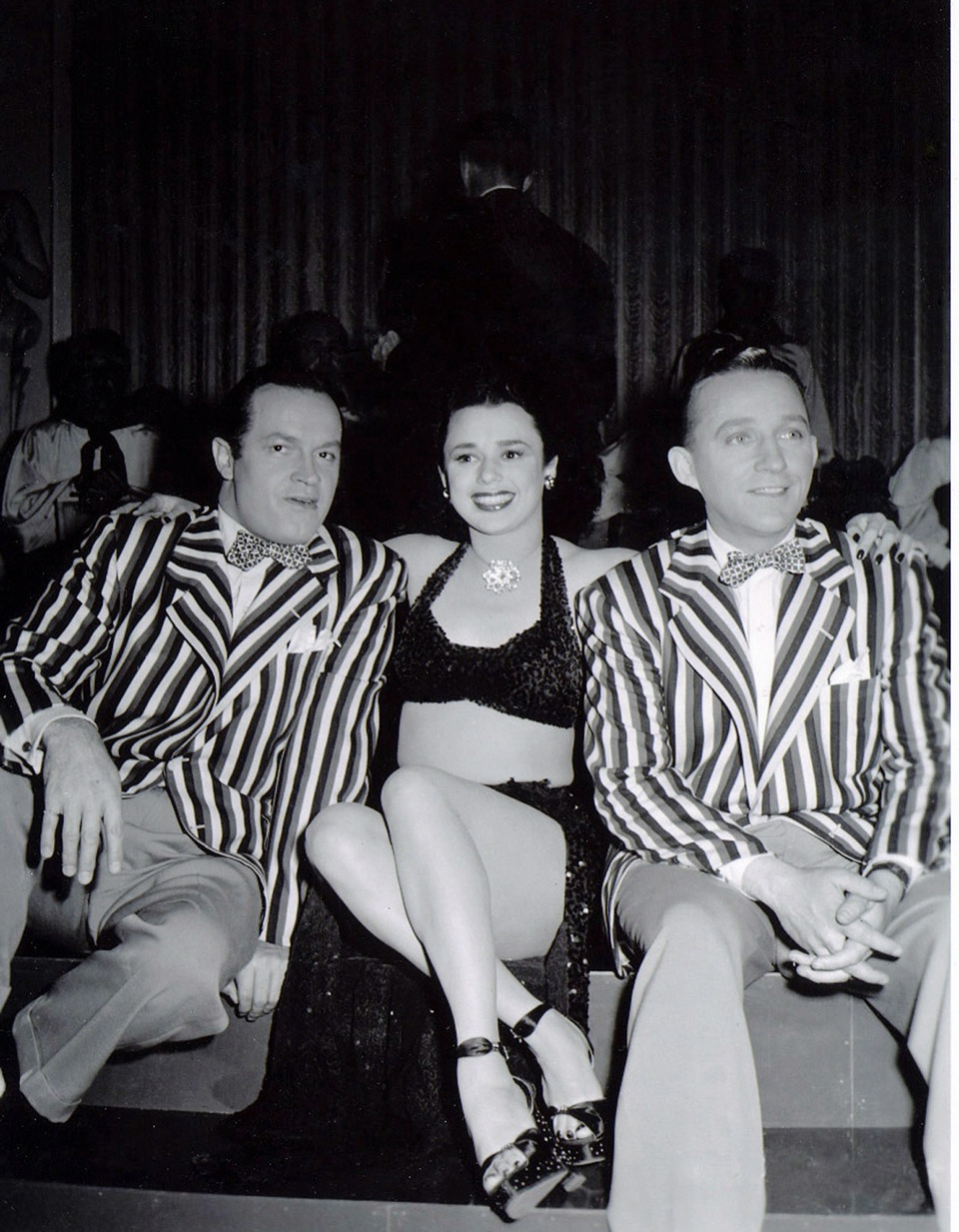
Marquita Rivera with Bob Hope and Bing Crosby in 1947

A childhood friend of bandleader Tito Puente, Rivera, accompanied by her costume designer mother, earned her first role as a featured dancer in the Broadway production George White's Scandals of 1936. She next performed at the 1939 New York World's Fair with King George VI and Queen Elizabeth attending during their respective royal visits, something she considered the highlight of her nascent career.

She toured Boston, Chicago and Philadelphia in bands headed by Paul Whiteman and Noro Morales. Appearing in many New York venues, including The Apollo, Roxy, Paramount, Loew's State Theatre, Strand and Radio City Music Hall, Rivera shared the stages of such performers as Ella Fitzgerald, Frank Sinatra, Mickey Rooney, Ann Miller, Dean Martin and Jerry Lewis, Kathryn Grayson, Victor Borge, Ed Sullivan, Merv Griffin and Betty Hutton.

Rivera put together her own show and performed at the Latin Quarter (nightclub) and Havana-Madrid in New York. She was a marquee name back in her homeland where she entertained at venues such as Zero's Nightclub and El San Juan Theatre. In the mid-1940s Rivera was signed by Azteca Studios in Mexico City. She acted for director Fernando Soler in Me persigue una mujer (1947) with Jose Torvay and David Silva, and in the comedy El Conquistador (1947), starring Torvay and Enrique Herrera. After her contract ended at Azteca, Rivera went on to sign a Hollywood contract with Paramount Pictures, and made her American movie debut as lead singer and specialty performer in the Bob Hope-Bing Crosby comedy The Road to Rio (1947). Although Rivera was selected in a popularity poll by Mexican filmgoers to star in an independent film biography of the late "Mexican spitfire" Lupe Vélez, the film was shelved when legal issues arose involving Vélez's estate.

External audio
- You may watch Marquita Rivera in "Luba Malina - Cuban Pete" here

She continued to work in "hot spots" such as the famous Ciro's nightclub with Desi Arnaz's band. In 1948, Rivera was honored with the Key to the City of San Juan by Mayor Felisa Rincón de Gautier for her achievements on Broadway, Mexico, and in Hollywood. In December 2011, she was honored in Puerto Rico with special honors from the Senate for her achievements as one of the first Latin/American actresses, two of her children attended. In May 2012, Rivera was honored in Chicago, Ill with the Antonio Martorell Award for Artistic Excellence on her 90th birthday, her son attended.

== Personal life ==
Rivera was married to business tycoon Albert Vernon Ashbrook from 1946 to 1949 and they had one child, Marquita, her namesake. In 1951, she married physician Eugene N. Biscardi II in New York City, they had six children and remained married until his death in 1988. Of their children, eldest son Eugene Biscardi III, a model-turned-fashion photographer has appeared occasionally as an actor on film and TV, and daughter Jessica Biscardi, a model/actress was the 1973 Miss New York City winner. Another daughter, Lucrezia, did not enter the entertainment business.

By the 1950s, Rivera concentrated on raising her large family and made few public appearances. In 1963, she made a special appearance at Carnegie Hall that featured opera performers Thomas Hayward, Rina Telli, Dino Formichini and James Boxwill, led by Philharmonic conductor Warner S. Bass. In 1977, she returned to the stage in a limited engagement of her own off-Broadway revue, The Marquita Rivera Show. Rivera's last television appearance was in Sanford and Son. By the 1980s her husband, Dr. Biscardi retired and the couple relocated to Los Angeles where Rivera would occasionally make TV appearances and travel as a beauty contestant judge. Following the death of her husband in 1988, Rivera chose to completely retire.

== Death ==
On October 21, 2002, Rivera died at Cedars-Sinai Hospital in Los Angeles, California following a stroke. She was survived by her seven children, as well as 17 grandchildren and 1 great-grandchild.

== References in popular culture ==
- Marquita is one of the legacies honored in Miluka Rivera's book "El legado puertorriqueño en Hollywood, los famosos y los olvidados" (The Puerto Rican Legacy in Hollywood, the Famous and the Forgotten)
- Marquita was the inspiration for the protagonist and is featured on the cover of Mexico City The Golden Years

== Awards ==
- 1948: Honored with the Key to the City of San Juan, Puerto Rico by Mayor Felisa de Rincon, for her achievements on Broadway, Mexico, and in Hollywood.
- 2011: Puerto Rico Senate Legacy Award.
- 2011: Federation of Mayors Award, San Juan, Puerto Rico.
- 2012: City of Chicago Mayors Award of Recognition.
- 2012: Antonio Martorell Award for Artistic Excellence by the Institute of Puerto Rican Arts and Culture (IPRAC).

== Filmography ==
| Year | Title | Role | Notes |
|---|---|---|---|
| 1946 | Cuban Pete | | |
| 1947 | Me persigue una mujer | | |
| 1947 | El conquistador | | |
| 1947 | Road to Rio | Lead Singer and Dancer | Uncredited |
| 1981 | Sanford | Woman #1 | Episode: "Cal's Mom", (final appearance) |

== See also ==
- List of Puerto Ricans
- History of women in Puerto Rico
- Mexican films of 1947
