= Marked Cards (film) =

1948 film

- Directed by: René Cardona
- Written by: René Cardona; Ernesto Cortázar; Ramón Pérez Peláez
- Produced by: Alfredo Ripstein Jr.
- Starring: Pedro Infante; Marga López; René Cardona
- Cinematography: Jack Draper
- Edited by: Carlos Savage
- Music by: Rosalío Ramírez; Federico Ruiz
- Production companies: Alameda Films; Producciónes Grovas
- Distributed by: Azteca Films
- Release date: 25 March 1948
- Running time: 92 minutes
- Country: Mexico
- Language: Spanish

Marked Cards (Spanish: Cartas marcadas) is a 1948 Mexican romantic comedy film directed by René Cardona and starring Pedro Infante, Marga López and Cardona. The plot is loosely inspired by William Shakespeare's The Taming of the Shrew. It was shot at the Azteca Studios in Mexico City. The film's sets were designed by the art director Luis Moya.

== Cast ==
- Pedro Infante as Manuel
- Marga López as Victoria
- René Cardona as Don Manuel
- Armando Soto La Marina as Tepalcate
- Alejandro Ciangherotti as Ernesto
- Francisco Reiguera as Notario; Don Aquilino
- Beatriz Ramos as Indita
- Alberto Sacramento as Campesino
- René Cardona Jr. as Papelerito
- Hermanas Julián as Cantantes
- Cecilia Leger as Sirvienta
- Humberto Rodríguez as Testigo
- Kika Meyer as Enfermera

== Bibliography ==
- Agrasánchez, Rogelio. Cine Mexicano: Posters from the Golden Age, 1936-1956. Chronicle Books, 2001.
- Graham, Rob. Shakespeare: A Crash Course. Watson-Guptill, 2000.
- Riera, Emilio García . Historia documental del cine mexicano: 1946–1948. Universidad de Guadalajara, 1992.
