= Angels of the Arrabal =

1949 film

- Directed by: Raúl de Anda
- Written by: Raúl de Anda; Robert Quigley; Fernando Méndez
- Produced by: Raúl de Anda
- Starring: Sofía Álvarez; David Silva; Carlos López Moctezuma
- Cinematography: Ignacio Torres
- Edited by: Carlos Savage
- Music by: Manuel Esperón
- Production company: Producciones Raúl de Anda
- Release date: 26 August 1949
- Running time: 103 minutes
- Country: Mexico
- Language: Spanish

Angels of the Arrabal (Spanish: Ángeles de arrabal) is a 1949 Mexican crime film directed by Raúl de Anda and starring Sofía Álvarez, David Silva and Carlos López Moctezuma. It was shot at the Azteca Studios in Mexico City. The film's sets were designed by the art director Jorge Fernández.

== Cast ==
- Sofía Álvarez as Lupe, La Tapatía
- David Silva as Juan Martínez, el nene
- Carlos López Moctezuma as Comandante Pepe Morán
- Carmelita González as Lolita
- Víctor Parra as Manuel Sánchez, el Suavecito
- Sara Montes as Lucha
- José Elías Moreno as El aguador
- Gregorio Acosta as Cliente cabaret
- Julia Alonso as Cabaretera habla telefono
- Gloria Cansino as Enfermera
- Alfonso Carti as Policía
- Jorge Chesterking as Cliente cabaret
- Manuel de la Vega as El 27, agente policía
- José Escanero as Custodio
- Magdalena Estrada as Cabaretera
- Amalia Gama as Panchita
- Pascual García Peña
- Beatriz Jimeno as Enfermera amargada
- Araceli Julián as Cantante
- Francisco Llopis as Don Ramón
- Carmen Manzano as Cabaretera
- Pepe Martínez as Sr. Glad
- José Muñoz as Don Miguel
- Pepe Nava as Flaco
- Gonzalo Ruiz
- Raquel Téllez Girón as La negra, encargada cabaret

== Bibliography ==
- Emilio García Riera. Historia del cine mexicano. Secretaría de Educación Pública, 1986.
