= Sister Alegría =

1952 film

- Directed by: Tito Davison
- Written by: Julio Alejandro; Jesús Cárdenas; Tito Davison
- Produced by: Sergio Kogan
- Starring: Rosita Quintana; Carmen Montejo; Andrea Palma
- Cinematography: Jack Draper
- Edited by: Jorge Bustos
- Music by: Raúl Lavista
- Production company: Internacional Cinematográfica
- Release date: 1 October 1952
- Running time: 100 minutes
- Country: Mexico
- Language: Spanish

Sister Alegría (Spanish: Sor Alegría) is a 1952 Mexican comedy drama film directed by Tito Davison and starring Rosita Quintana, Carmen Montejo and Andrea Palma. It was shot at the Churubusco Studios in Mexico City. The film's sets were designed by the art director Gunther Gerszo. It was nominated for three Ariel Awards including Best Supporting Actress for Carmen Montejo.

== Synopsis ==
A young party girl's carefree life changes when she discovers the poverty that exists in the city. She chooses to become a nun to do good in the world.

== Cast ==
- Rosita Quintana as Sor Verónica / Ana María
- Carmen Montejo as Sor Angélica
- Andrea Palma as Doña Mercedes
- Carmelita González as Sor Mónica
- Anita Blanch as Madre superiora
- Carlos Agostí as Rafael
- Prudencia Grifell as Sor Úrsula
- Virginia Manzano as Mujer de la calle
- Roberto Cobo as El Ratón
- Francisco Jambrina as Obispo
- Magda Donato as Madre vicaria
- Aurora Walker as Doña Isabel
- Miguel Ángel Ferriz as Padre de Ana María
- Beatriz Ramos as Sor Patricia
- Gilberto González as El mechudo
- Lidia Franco as Sor Jacinta
- Consuelo Monteagudo as Monja cocinera
- Eduardo Alcaraz as Apostador hipódromo
- Héctor Mateos as Martín
- Lupe Carriles as Mujer pobre
- María Gentil Arcos as La nana
- Magda Guzmán as Novia de Manuel

== Bibliography ==
- Riera, Emilio García. Historia documental del cine mexicano: 1951-1952. Universidad de Guadalajara, 1992.
- Wilt, David E. The Mexican Filmography, 1916 through 2001. McFarland, 2024.
