= A Woman's Diary =

1944 film

- Directed by: José Benavides
- Written by: Miguel Morayta (novel); José Benavides; Armando Fernández Bustamante
- Produced by: José Elvira
- Starring: Sofía Álvarez; Luis Aldás; Rafael Baledón
- Cinematography: Jack Draper
- Edited by: Mario González; José W. Bustos
- Music by: Gonzalo Curiel
- Production company: Filmex
- Distributed by: Filmex
- Release date: 15 June 1944
- Country: Mexico
- Language: Spanish

A Woman's Diary (Spanish: Diario de una mujer) is a 1944 Mexican drama film directed by José Benavides and starring Sofía Álvarez, Luis Aldás and Rafael Baledón. It was shot at the Azteca Studios in Mexico City. The film's sets were designed by the art director Luis Moya.

== Cast ==
- Sofía Álvarez
- Luis Aldás
- Rafael Baledón
- Virginia Serret
- José Morcillo
- Enrique García Álvarez
- Manuel Noriega
- Estanislao Schillinsky
- Aurora Ruiz
- Alfredo Solorzano

== Bibliography ==
- Riera, Emilio García. Historia documental del cine mexicano: 1943-1945. Universidad de Guadalajara, 1992.
- Tuñón, Julia. Mujeres de luz y sombra en el cine mexicano: la construcción de una imagen (1939-1952). Colegio de México, 1998.
