= You're Missing the Point =

1940 film by Juan Bustillo Oros

- Theatrical release poster
- Directed by: Juan Bustillo Oro
- Screenplay by: Humberto Gómez Landero; Juan Bustillo Oro
- Produced by: Jesús Grovas
- Starring: Mario Moreno «Cantinflas» Joaquín Pardavé; Sara García; Sofía Álvarez; Dolores Camarillo
- Cinematography: Jack Draper
- Edited by: Mario González; Juan Bustillo Oro
- Music by: Raúl Lavista
- Production company: Grovas-Oro Films
- Release date: 11 September 1940
- Running time: 112 minutes
- Country: Mexico
- Language: Spanish

You're Missing the Point, or Ahí está el detalle (Spanish, 'There's the rub', literally 'There lies the detail') is a 1940 Mexican comedy film starring Mario Moreno «Cantinflas». It was produced by Jesús Grovas and directed by Juan Bustillo Oro, who also co-wrote the screenplay. The film also features Joaquín Pardavé, Sara García, Sofía Álvarez, and Dolores Camarillo. It was the twelfth film in Cantinflas's career, considered one of his best by Mexican film critics, as well as one of Mexico's best films.

The film's sets were designed by the art director Carlos Toussaint.

== Plot summary ==
Cantinflas is the boyfriend of Paz, the household maid of Cayetano Lastre. It is dinnertime and Cantinflas is waiting outside the mansion for Paz's whistle: a sign for Cantinflas to enter the kitchen to eat. This is because there is a dog in the front yard named "Bobby", and Paz's boss is unaware of Cantinflas's forays into the house. While waiting, another man also arrives to do the same, pulling out a cigarette and dropping his wallet in the process, which Cantinflas picks up when entering the house. Though like other times Cantinflas goes straight in to eat, this time his girlfriend has a favor to ask him: to kill the dog "Bobby" who has suffered a sudden onset of rabies and doesn't let Cayetano leave for an appointment. Seeing his hesitation, Paz is adamant: if he does not kill the dog, he does not get to eat. Cantinflas is nervous about the idea, but eventually kills the dog with a gun.

Meanwhile, inside the house, after Cayetano leaves, his wife Dolores del Paso has given entrance to the other man: her ex-boyfriend Bobby Lechuga, a con artist who plans to blackmail her with some undated letters with a new date unless she does as he says. However, Cayetano suddenly returns to the house, as his overbearing jealousy has led him to think that his wife cheats on him and has plotted a scheme to expose her supposed "adultery" red-handed. Hearing his arrival, Paz hides Cantlinflas and later does the same with Bobby. Cayetano finds and catches Cantinflas, assuming he is his wife's lover, but Dolores pretends that Cantinflas is her long-estranged brother, Leonardo del Paso. Being that his father-in-law (Dolores and Leonardo's father) needed the presence of all heirs to read and distribute their inheritance, Cayetano (whose business have been slow lately) begins treating Cantinflas like a king in order to gain his trust. Naturally, Cantinflas takes advantage of the situation.

Things get complicated when Clotilde Regalado, Leonardo's partner, reads a newspaper clip mentioning Leonardo and the reading of the will, and makes her presence in the company of all of the couple's sons (and then some). Cantinflas tries to tell the truth about his identity to Cayetano, but as Dolores needs "Leonardo" to conceal the blackmail and Clotilde needs him to recognize and support her children, he continues to play along with the charade. Fully aware that Cantinflas is not the real Leonardo, she still moves over to Cayetano's house with the rest of her family, who are as much freeloaders as Cantinflas is. Intending for "Leonardo" to settle down, as well as to prevent him running away from "his" family and, by extension, further delay the reading of the will, Cayetano arranges for "Leonardo" to marry Clotilde.

Cantinflas understandably hesitates and tries as much as he can to avoid being married, and when he is about to be forced to do so by using his fingerprints, policemen arrive at the house, looking for Leonardo. Confusion arises, as Bobby Lechuga has been killed and Cantinflas admits to killing "Bobby" (the dog, not the gangster), exacerbate by the fact that Bobby's wallet (which he picked up at the beginning) is found among his clothes, so he is arrested and put on trial. In a prolonged courtroom sequence, Cantinflas again confesses to killing "Bobby" the rabid dog, but as almost everyone in court sees him as Leonardo confessing to the murder of Bobby the con-artist, he is inevitably found guilty. Fortunately for him, the real Leonardo appears and explains about Bobby's blackmailing and the fact that he killed the extorter in self-defense. Cantinflas is fully acquitted and returns to his old antics, waiting outside Cayetano's mansion for Paz's whistle at dinnertime and then entering the kitchen to eat.

== Cast ==
- Mario Moreno as Cantinflas
- Joaquín Pardavé as Cayetano Lastre
- Sofía Álvarez as Dolores del Paso
- Dolores Camarillo as Paz
- Sara García as Clotilde Regalado, Leonardo del Paso's mistress
- Manuel Noriega as the Judge
- Antonio R. Frausto as Cantinflas' lawyer
- Agustín Isunza as a prosecutor who tries "Leonardo".
- Antonio Bravo as Bobby Lechuga "The Fox Terrier"
- Francisco Jambrina as the real Leonardo del Paso.
- Conchita Gentil Arcos as Loretita
- Joaquín Coss as the Magistrate
- Eduardo Arozamena as the deaf judge
- Rafael Icardo as the dim-witted policeman
- Alfredo Varela, Jr. as the federal scribe
- Ángel T. Sala as the inspector
- Estanislao Shilinsky as the deaf judge's assistant
- Max Langler as the policeman
- Narciso Busquets as one of Clotilde and Leonardo's sons
- Wilfrido Moreno as an extra
- Adolfo Bernáldez as an extra

== Production ==
The film was released under the title You're Missing the Point in the United States. You're Missing the Point was the first feature film in which Mario Moreno was the lead actor. Under the name of his character in this film, Cantinflas, he achieved fame and used it as his stage name and the name of his characters in other films. In this film, he changed the film's director Juan Bustillo Oro's conventional sense of humor by presenting himself as linguistically as well as in appearance as a man of the common people, instead of using high-quality Spanish. The film's last scene is based on true events involving Mexican criminal Álvaro Chapa, which inspired Cantinflas' form of speech for this film, also known as "cantinfleada". Bustillo Oro based it largely on his experience as a pro bono lawyer at the Cárcel de Belén. The film was completed in only three weeks, with the only problems arising from Cantinflas's improvisation over what he considered to be a poorly written script. In a comprehensive list of the 100 best Mexican films between 1919 and 1992, which was created by 25 film critics, filmmakers and historians and published on 16 July 1994 in the magazine Somos, You're Missing the Point was placed tenth. In 1950, the film was remade as Vivillo desde chiquillo.

== Bibliography ==
- Schroeder Rodríguez, Paul A. Latin American Cinema: A Comparative History. University of California Press, 2016.
- Rodríguez-Hernández, Raúl; Schaefer, Claudia. The Supernatural Sublime: The Wondrous Ineffability of the Everyday in Films from Mexico and Spain. University of Nebraska Press, 2019.
- Mora, Carl J. Mexican Cinema: Reflections of a Society, 1896–2004. McFarland & Co Inc, Jefferson N.C. 2005, ISBN 978-0786420834.
- Wilt, David E. The Mexican Filmography 1916 through 2001. McFarland & Co Inc, Jefferson NC 2004. ISBN 978-0-7864-6122-6.
