= The Coward (1939 film) =

The Coward (El Cobarde)
- Directed by: René Cardona
- Written by: Adolfo Fernández Bustamante (play); Josep Carner Ribalta; Antonio Guzmán Aguilera
- Produced by: Juan Pezet
- Starring: Julián Soler; Adria Delhort; Josefina Escobedo
- Cinematography: Raúl Martínez Solares
- Edited by: Juan José Marino
- Music by: Armando Rosales
- Production company: Producciones Pezet
- Release date: 21 March 1939
- Running time: 66 minutes
- Country: Mexico
- Language: Spanish

The Coward (Spanish: El cobarde) is a 1939 Mexican war film directed by René Cardona and starring Julián Soler, Adria Delhort and Josefina Escobedo.

== Story ==
Alberto (Soler) is born in the imaginary republic of Sucravia (a country much like Mexico) in time of war, where his father dies a hero's death. He grows up as an effeminate lover of music. His mother (Delhort) sends him to the military college. There, Fernando (Aldás) bullies him, but gradually they become friends. A second war breaks out, and Alberto tries to avoid danger. If he is to change his life, he must face his fear.

== Reception ==
The New York Times, reviewing the film in 1939, describes El Cobarde as "likely to keep the spectators guessing until the last reel". In their reviewer's opinion, Cardonas combines some psychology with "considerable talk about the now generally discredited theory of prenatal influence", a mother's genuine pride in her son, and a gentle romance. Soler, says the reviewer, plays the "vacillating" son of a hero well, and Delhort is "excellent as the Spartan mother" intent on preserving the family tradition of patriotic bravery. Escobedo and the supporting cast ably play mainly comic roles.

== Cast ==
- Julián Soler as Capitán Alberto Anzures
- Adria Delhort as Doña Amalia
- Josefina Escobedo as Leonor
- Antonio R. Frausto as Juancho
- Lita Enhart as Elvira
- Luis Aldás as Fernando
- Joaquín Coss as Director del colegio
- Dolores Camarillo as Pancha
- Ángel T. Sala as Sargento Rocha
- Ricardo Mondragón as General
- Arturo Soto Rangel as Doctor
- Gustavo Carrillo as General
- Narciso Busquets as Alberto (niño)
- Isa Gary as Rosa
- Isauro Ruiz as Sargento
- Julio Ahuet as Soldado
- Roberto Cañedo as Minor Role
- Manuel Dondé as Minor Role

== Bibliography ==
- Elena, Alberto. El cine del tercer mundo: diccionario de realizadores. Turfan, 1993.
