= Three Black Angels =

1960 film

- Directed by: Fernando Cortés
- Written by: Fernando Cortés; Fernando Galiana
- Produced by: Fernando de Fuentes hijo Gonzalo Elvira; Rafael Mirko
- Starring: Miguel Aceves Mejía; Yolanda Varela; Pedro Vargas
- Cinematography: Jack Draper
- Edited by: Carlos Savage
- Music by: Manuel Esperón
- Production companies: Art-Mex; Diana Films
- Release date: 9 June 1960
- Running time: 90 minutes
- Country: Mexico
- Language: Spanish

Three Black Angels (Spanish: Tres angelitos negros) is a 1960 Mexican comedy film directed by Fernando Cortés and starring Miguel Aceves Mejía, Yolanda Varela and Pedro Vargas.

== Cast ==
- Miguel Aceves Mejía as Ángel Reynosa
- Yolanda Varela as Catalina
- Pedro Vargas as Señor cura
- Óscar Pulido as Tomás
- Rodolfo Landa as Alonso
- Óscar Ortiz de Pinedo as Don Óscar
- José Pardavé as Matias Galván
- Rafael Estrada
- Enedina Díaz de León as Doña Perfecta, ama de llaves
- Francisco Reiguera as Doctor
- Carmen Romano
- Américo Caggiano
- Marujita Díaz as Maruja

== Bibliography ==
- María Luisa Amador & Jorge Ayala Blanco. Cartelera cinematográfica, 1960-1969. Centro Universitario de Estudios Cinematográficos, 1986.
