= José Benavides (director) =

Mexican film director

José Benavides Pérez
- Born: 1911; Mexico City, Mexico
- Died: 17 September 1945 (aged 33–34); Jojutla, Morelos, Mexico
- Occupations: Film director, screenwriter,
- Years active: 1935–1945 (film)

José Benavides hijo (1911–1945) was a Mexican screenwriter and film director. He directed fourteen feature films during the Golden Age of Mexican Cinema before his career was cut short by his early death.

== Selected filmography ==
- The Adventurous Captain (1939)
- Three Peasants on a Donkey (1939)
- Poor Devil (1940)
- El Zorro de Jalisco (1941)
- Alejandra (1942)
- Land of Passions (1943)
- A Woman's Diary (1944)
- The Two Orphans (1944)
- Caribbean Rose (1946)
- The Operetta Queen (1946)

== Bibliography ==
- Irwin, Robert & Ricalde, Maricruz. Global Mexican Cinema: Its Golden Age. British Film Institute, 2013.
- Paulo Antônio Paranaguá. Mexican Cinema. British Film Institute, 1995.
- Sadlier, Darlene Joy (ed.) Latin American Melodrama: Passion, Pathos, and Entertainment. University of Illinois Press, 2009.
