= Jack Draper (cinematographer) =

American cinematographer (1892–1962)

- Born: March 5, 1892; Spencer, Indiana, United States
- Died: October 1962 (aged 70); Mexico City, Mexico
- Other name: Lauren A. Draper
- Occupation: Cinematographer
- Years active: 1925-1962 (film)

Jack Draper (1892–1962) was an American cinematographer. He worked in Mexico for most of his career, where he was a leading film worker of the Golden Age of Mexican cinema.

== Selected filmography ==
- Pony Express Rider (1926)
- Across the Plains (1928)
- Cheyenne Trails (1928)
- Jazzland (1928)
- Trails of Treachery (1928)
- The Phantom (1931)
- Poppy of the Road (1937)
- Horse for Horse (1939)
- Every Madman to His Specialty (1939)
- Here's the Point (1940)
- In the Times of Don Porfirio (1940)
- To the Sound of the Marimba (1941)
- I'm a Real Mexican (1942)
- Simón Bolívar (1942)
- Romeo and Juliet (1943)
- Christopher Columbus (1943)
- The Two Orphans (1944)
- My Memories of Mexico (1944)
- A Woman's Diary (1944)
- Mischievous Susana (1945)
- I Am a Fugitive (1946)
- The Road to Sacramento (1946)
- The Operetta Queen (1946)
- Ramona (1946)
- Fly Away, Young Man! (1947)
- Marked Cards (1948)
- The Last Night (1948)
- The Black Sheep (1949)
- The Woman I Lost (1949)
- Over the Waves (1950)
- You Shall Not Covet Thy Son's Wife (1950)
- Black Angustias (1950)
- Kill Me Because I'm Dying! (1951)
- Full Speed Ahead (1951)
- What Has That Woman Done to You? (1951)
- Radio Patrol (1951)
- The Cry of the Flesh (1951)
- The Night Falls (1952)
- The Atomic Fireman (1952)
- Sister Alegría (1952)
- Tehuantepec (1954)
- Acapulco (1956)
- Puss Without Boots (1957)
- A Thousand and One Nights (1958)
- The Phantom of the Operetta (1960)
- To Each His Life (1960)
- Three Black Angels (1960)
- Love in the Shadows (1960)
- Don Quixote de Orson Welles (1992)

== Bibliography ==
- Charles Ramírez Berg. The Classical Mexican Cinema: The Poetics of the Exceptional Golden Age Films. University of Texas Press, 2015.
