= Julio Ahuet =

Mexican actor

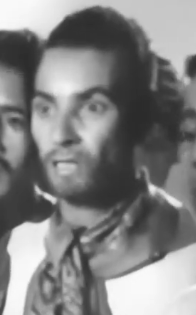
- Ahuet in Canaima (1945)
- Occupation: Actor
- Years active: 1938-1992 (film)

Julio Ahuet was a Mexican film actor. He appeared in more than a hundred and thirty films during his career, including Women Without Tomorrow (1951), Here Comes Martin Corona (1952), and the El Santo film Profanadores de tumbas (1966).

== Selected filmography ==
- Heads or Tails (1937)
- The Cemetery of the Eagles (1939)
- The Coward (1939)
- In the Times of Don Porfirio (1940)
- The Rock of Souls (1942)
- Jesusita in Chihuahua (1942)
- Beautiful Michoacán (1943)
- The Circus (1943)
- María Eugenia (1943)
- Resurrection (1943)
- The Spectre of the Bride (1943)
- Cuando habla el corazón (1943)
- The Tiger of Jalisco (1947)
- A Gypsy in Jalisco (1947)
- Felipe Was Unfortunate (1947)
- If I'm to Be Killed Tomorrow (1947)
- The Genius (1948)
- Spurs of Gold (1948)
- Nosotros los Pobres (1948)
- Los tres huastecos (1948)
- Midnight (1949)
- Don't Love Me So Much (1949)
- Red Rain (1950)
- My Favourite (1950)
- Port of Temptation (1951)
- Maria Islands (1951)
- Women Without Tomorrow (1951)
- We Maids (1951)
- Here Comes Martin Corona (1952)
- El Enamorado (1952)
- The Martyr of Calvary (1952)
- The Bandits of Cold River (1956)

== Bibliography ==
- Ibarra, Jesús. Los Bracho: tres generaciones de cine mexicano. UNAM, 2006.
- Gallardo Saborido, Emilio José. Gitana tenías que ser: las Andalucías imaginadas por las coproducciones fílmicas España-latinoamérica. Centro de Estudios Andaluces, 2010.
- Pitts, Michael R. Columbia Pictures Horror, Science Fiction and Fantasy Films, 1928-1982. McFarland, 2014.
