= Midnight (1949 film) =

1949 film

- Directed by: Tito Davison
- Written by: Edmundo Báez; Tito Davison; Ricardo López Méndez; José Revueltas; Pedro de Urdimalas; Alfredo G. Volpe
- Produced by: Gregorio Walerstein
- Starring: Arturo de Córdova; Elsa Aguirre; Marga López
- Cinematography: Gabriel Figueroa
- Edited by: Mario González
- Music by: Manuel Esperón
- Production company: Cinematográfica Filmex
- Release date: 28 April 1949
- Running time: 93 minutes
- Country: Mexico
- Language: Spanish

Midnight (Spanish: Medianoche) is a 1949 Mexican crime film directed by Tito Davison and starring Arturo de Córdova, Elsa Aguirre and Marga López. It was shot at the Azteca Studios in Mexico City. The film's sets were designed by the art director José Rodríguez Granada.

== Cast ==
- Arturo de Córdova as Daniel Benitez
- Elsa Aguirre as Cora Moreno
- Marga López as Rosita
- Carlos López Moctezuma as Sr. Carrasco
- José Elías Moreno as Comandante Enrique Robles
- Dolores Camarillo as Tía de Rosita
- José Ángel Espinosa 'Ferrusquilla' as Profesor Florentino Mendizábal
- Pascual García Peña as Chanchomon
- Antonio R. Frausto as Onofre, director de orquesta
- Juan Garcia as El norteño
- Manuel Dondé as Melquiades
- Juan Orraca as Esbirro de Daniel
- Carlos Múzquiz as Agente de policía
- Isabel del Puerto as Lidia
- Jorge Arriaga as Romeo
- Ceferino Silva as El zurdo, portero cabaret
- Ismael Pérez as Domingo
- Julio Ahuet as Jugador de poker
- Daniel Arroyo as Representante de escuela
- Stephen Berne as Esbirro calvo de Daniel
- Guillermo Bravo Sosa as Jugador de poker
- Alfonso Carti as Sargento
- Ricardo Carti as Invitado a reunión
- Felipe de Flores as Anunciador cabaret
- Manuel de la Vega as Piloto avión
- Emilio Garibay as Esbirro de Carrasco
- Ramón Gay as Esbirro de Daniel
- Cecilia Leger as Invitada a reunión
- Antonio Leo as Empleado cantina
- Paco Martínez as Señor boticario
- José Luis Moreno as Estudiante escuela
- José Muñoz as Agente de policía
- Pedro Padilla as Pasajero camión
- José Pardavé as Chango, marihuano
- Ignacio Peón as Invitado a reunión
- Joaquín Roche as Capitán de barco
- Ramón Sánchez as Esbirro de Daniel
- Manuel Trejo Morales as Agente policía
- Armando Velasco as Jefe de Policía
- Hernán Vera as Cantinero

== Bibliography ==
- Arturo Agramonte & Luciano Castillo. Ramón Peón, el hombre de los glóbulos negros. Editorial de Ciencias Sociales, 2003.
