= Radio Patrol (1951 film) =

1951 film

- Directed by: Ernesto Cortázar
- Written by: Jaime Contreras; Ernesto Cortázar
- Produced by: Frank C. Solís
- Starring: David Silva; Emilia Guiú; Arturo Soto Rangel
- Cinematography: Jack Draper
- Edited by: Gloria Schoemann
- Music by: Manuel Esperón
- Production company: Olimpia Producciones
- Distributed by: Clasa-Mohme
- Release date: 24 October 1951
- Running time: 80 minutes
- Country: Mexico
- Language: Spanish

Radio Patrol (Spanish: Radio Patrulla) is a 1951 Mexican crime drama film directed by Ernesto Cortázar and starring David Silva, Emilia Guiú and Arturo Soto Rangel. It was shot at the Churubusco Studios in Mexico City. The film's sets were designed by the art director José Rodríguez Granada.

== Cast ==
- David Silva as Rodolfo Nava
- Emilia Guiú as Diana
- Arturo Soto Rangel as Sargento Roberto Nava
- José Muñoz as Jefe policía Rodrigo
- Arturo Martínez as Rogelio Nava
- Mauricio Garcés as Sebastián
- Mario Caballero as Comediante
- Arturo Castro 'Bigotón' as Comediante
- Joaquín Chacón as Cantante
- Herminio Kenny as Cantante
- Lupita Alday as Cantante
- El Trío Aguilillas as Grupo

== Bibliography ==
- Riera, Emilio García. Historia documental del cine mexicano: 1951-1952. Universidad de Guadalajara, 1992.
- Wilt, David E. The Mexican Filmography, 1916 through 2001. McFarland, 2024.
