= Miguel Arenas =

Spanish film actor

- Born: 1902; Alicante, Spain
- Died: 3 November 1965 (aged 62–63); Mexico City, Mexico
- Occupation: Actor
- Years active: 1933–1965 (film)

Miguel Arenas (1902 – 3 November 1965) was a Spanish film actor. He emigrated to Mexico where he appeared in more than a hundred films.

== Career ==
He began his acting training at the Ramón de Campoamor Society. He joined Arturo Lledó's company. In 1919 he joined the Prado y Chicote company, which performed at the Teatro Cómico in Madrid. The following year, he formed the varietés trio from Alicante called Los Hernán-Alvarenas, composed by himself, Manuel Álvarez and Josefina Hernández. He left Spain in the early 30's because he started a tour with a theater company throughout Latin America.

Among the films in which he participated, the following stand out: The Disobedient Son (1944), Amok (1944), El hijo desobediente (1945), Un día con el diablo (1945), Cuando los padres se quedan solos (1949), The Martyr of Calvary (1952), Los Fernández de Peralvillo (1954), Tizoc (1957), and Macario (1960).

== Personal life ==
On August 19, 1933, while on tour în Venezuela, his daughter Rosita Arenas Dios was born to his then girlfriend, the Spanish Dolores Dios Bermudez. That same year he decided to settle permanently in Mexico, where he pursued a film career. On July 17, 1942, he married Dolores, from whom he divorced at an unknown date.

== Selected filmography ==
- Heroic Silence (1935)
- The Mystery of the Ghastly Face (1935)
- While Mexico Sleeps (1938)
- I Will Live Again (1940)
- A Macabre Legacy (1940)
- The Count of Monte Cristo (1942)
- Lightning in the South (1943)
- The Two Orphans (1944)
- Michael Strogoff (1944)
- The Lady of the Camellias (1944)
- A Day with the Devil (1945)
- The Disobedient Son (1945)
- Lo que va de ayer a hoy (1945)
- If I'm to Be Killed Tomorrow (1947)
- The Lost Child (1947)
- Anacleto Gets Divorced (1950)
- A Galician Dances the Mambo (1951)
- The Martyr of Calvary (1952)
- A Tailored Gentleman (1954)
- The Viscount of Monte Cristo (1954)
- Raffles (1958)
- Chucho el Roto (1960)
- My Mother Is Guilty (1960)
- El proceso de las señoritas Vivanco (1961)
- Los dos apóstoles (1966)
