= The Cry of the Flesh =

1951 film

- Directed by: Fernando Soler; Zacarías Gómez Urquiza
- Written by: Enrique Uthoff (novel); Neftali Beltrán; Fernando Soler
- Produced by: José Elvira
- Starring: Fernando Soler; Rosario Granados; Gustavo Rojo
- Cinematography: Jack Draper
- Edited by: Carlos Savage
- Music by: Gonzalo Curiel
- Production companies: Producciones Rodríguez Hermanos; Productora Continental
- Release date: 16 March 1951
- Running time: 85 minutes
- Country: Mexico
- Language: Spanish

The Cry of the Flesh (Spanish: El grito de la carne) is a 1951 Mexican drama film directed by Fernando Soler and Zacarías Gómez Urquiza and starring Soler, Rosario Granados and Gustavo Rojo. The film's sets were designed by the art director Javier Torres Torija. Soler was nominated for the Ariel Award for Best Actor.

== Synopsis ==
An experienced, established actor takes an interest in the career of an aspiring actress and comes to fall in love with her.

== Cast ==
- Fernando Soler as Guillermo de la Mora
- Rosario Granados as Lidia
- Gustavo Rojo as Roberto
- Antonio Monsell as Paco
- Sara Guasch as Beatriz Perez
- Maruja Grifell as La Balzatti
- Elda Peralta as Lupe
- Elodia Hernández as Caracteristica
- Alfredo Varela as Sr. Gutierrez
- Jeannette Petit as Cantante
- Juan Pulido as Invitado a fiesta
- Sergio Corona as Estudiante en escuela
- Jorge Martínez de Hoyos as Invitado a fiesta
- Beatriz Saavedra as Sonia
- Ana María Villaseñor as Estudiante
- Irma Dorantes as Estudiante
- Cecilia Leger as Mujer en teatro

== Bibliography ==
- Amador, María Luisa. Cartelera cinematográfica, 1950-1959. UNAM, 1985.
- Stock, Anne Marie (ed.) Framing Latin American Cinema: Contemporary Critical Perspectives. University of Minnesota Press, 1997.
