= Dolores Camarillo =

Mexican character actress

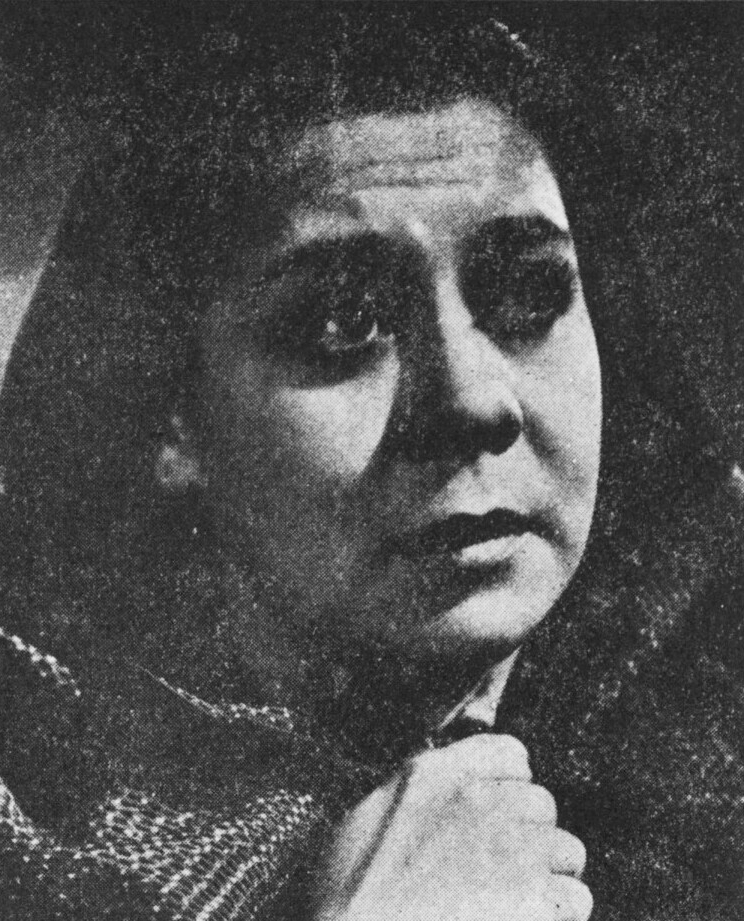
- Dolores Camarillo in 1945
- Born: Dolores Sepúlveda Camarillo; April 8, 1897; San Luis Potosí, Mexico
- Died: February 8, 1988 (aged 90); Mexico City, Mexico
- Occupation: Actress
- Years active: 1933–1986
- Spouse: Antonio R. Frausto

Dolores Camarillo (April 8, 1897 – February 8, 1988) was a Mexican character actress of film, television, and theater. She also was a makeup artist for films, and was frequently billed as "Fraustita".

== Personal life ==
The daughter of actors, Camarillo was a makeup artist for films in the 1930s. She was also a makeup teacher in the Andrés Soler Institute. She was married to fellow film actor Antonio R. Frausto, to whom she owed her professional nickname of "Fraustita", or meaning "little woman Frausto".

== Career ==
Camarillo debuted as an actress in 1915 in the theatrical play, La cara de Dios (The Face of God). She appeared in 124 films from 1933 to 1986. One of her most prominent roles in her film career is that of "Paz" in the popular 1940 Cantinflas film Ahí está el detalle. In the film, she received the sixth billing, after her other co-stars. She also appeared in supporting roles with actor Joaquín Pardavé in the Lebanese character comedies El baisano Jalil (1942) and El barchante Neguib (1946).

== Selected filmography ==
- Poppy of the Road (1937)
- Huapango (1938)
- The Coward (1939)
- Horse for Horse (1939)
- El indio (1939) ... Panchita
- Here's the Point (1940) ... Paz
- I Will Live Again (1940)
- To the Sound of the Marimba (1941)
- Oh, What Times, Don Simon! (1941)
- El baisano Jalil (1942) ... Sofía
- Alejandra (1942)
- The Black Angel (1942)
- My Memories of Mexico (1942) ... Conchita, Portera
- Beautiful Michoacán (1943)
- Father Morelos (1943)
- Lightning in the South (1943)
- The Operetta Queen (1946)
- El barchante Neguib (1946) ... Regina
- I Am a Charro of Rancho Grande (1947)
- Felipe Was Unfortunate (1947)
- Midnight (1949)
- Philip of Jesus (1949)
- When Children Sin (1952) ... Felipa
- Remember to Live (1953) ... Margarita
- School for Tramps (1955) ... Pancha, Servant
- My Mother Is Guilty (1960)
- The Paper Man (1963)
- So Loved Our Fathers (1964)
