= Gilberto González (actor) =

Mexican actor

- Born: 1906; Mexico
- Died: 21 March 1954 (aged 47–48); Palenque, Chiapas, Mexico
- Occupation: Actor
- Years active: 1933-1954

Gilberto González (1906 - 21 March 1954) was a Mexican actor. He appeared in more than ninety films from 1933 to 1954.

== Biography ==
Gilberto González was born in 1906 in México City, México. After several attempts, in 1933 he found a spot as an extra in the film Su última canción. In his third film, Janitzio (1935), he gets the antagonistic role, which made life impossible for the protagonist, played by Emilio Fernández. He was given the opportunity to play the major villain in other films as a result of this performance. He appeared in more than ninety films from 1933 to 1954.

Among the films in which he acts, Rebel Souls (1937) stands out, where three of the future pillars of Mexican cinema made their debut: Raúl de Anda, Alejandro Galindo and Víctor Manuel Mendoza, as producer, director and actor respectively; The Bandits of Cold River (1938), Sota, caballo y rey (1944), in which Luis Aguilar made his debut, Canaima (1945), alternating with the most famous couple of that time: Jorge Negrete, Gloria Marín and with the queen of melodrama Rosario Granados, which thanks to them he receives the Ariel Award for the best actor in a minor role, La selva de fuego (1945) with the diva Dolores del Río and Arturo de Córdova, The Pearl (1947) with Pedro Armendáriz, although he didn't play a big role in this film, it is arguably the most famous movie he appeared in. The Pearl is about a Mexican driver, named Quino, who discovers a very valuable pearl that is worth thousands at the bottom of the ocean. In the village they live, multiple people try to retrieve that pearl but dealers continuously rip them off, and others try and aggressively steal it. Quino's brother suggest they leave the village, but Quino struggles with the decision because he is trying to give his son an education. Captain from Castile (1947), his first experience in Hollywood in a small role, La vorágine (1949), La malquerida (1949), which stands out for the duel of divas Dolores del Río - Columba Domínguez, The Possession (1950) with Jorge Negrete and Miroslava, Vino el remolino y nos alevantó (1950), El suavecito (1951), Víctor Parra's consecrating film, Subida al cielo (1952) in which it is directed by Luis Buñuel, Now I'm Rich (1952), an intense drama starring Pedro Infante and Marga López, El bombero atómico (1952), one of his few comedy appearances, which is about a clumsy fireman, named Cantinflas, who gets a visit from his goddaughter, whose mother recently died in the jungle. The firemen becomes a policeman for safety reasons, and there life is smooth until gangsters kidnap his goddaughter. Next is El rebozo de Soledad (1952), for which he would get his last Ariel nomination.

His last film appearance would be in The Littlest Outlaw (1954), a film directed by Roberto Gavaldón in the United States for Disney. The film is about a peasant boy who steals an abused and beautiful stallion. Together they go through an adventure filled journey full of tense confrontation and danger. This journey portrays Mexicos rugged beauty. He died on March 21, 1954, due to a heart attack in Palenque, Chiapas, Mexico.

== Awards ==
=== Ariel Award ===
Year	Category	Film	Result
1947	Actor in a minor role	Canaima (film)	Winner
1948	Actor in a minor role	The Pearl (film)	Nomination
1951	Actor in a minor role	Vino el remolino y nos alevantó	Winner
1953	Actor in a minor role	Soledad's Shawl	Nomination

== Selected filmography ==
Year	Title	Role	Notes
1939	Horse for Horse		
1944	Cruel Destiny		
1947	The Pearl		
1947	If I'm to Be Killed Tomorrow		
1948	The Shadow of the Bridge		
1949	The Unloved Woman		
1950	Black Angustias		
1952	The Atomic Fireman		
1952	Sister Alegría		
1952	The Trace of Some Lips		
1953	The Mystery of the Express Car		
1954	The Price of Living		
