= Alejandra (1942 film) =

1942 film

- Directed by: José Benavides hijo
- Written by: Pedro Castera (novel); José Benavides hijo Catalina D'Erzell
- Produced by: Gregorio Walerstein
- Starring: Arturo de Córdova; Sara García; Anita Blanch
- Cinematography: Agustín Martínez Solares
- Edited by: Emilio Gómez Muriel
- Music by: Manuel Esperón
- Production company: Filmex
- Distributed by: Filmex
- Release date: 2 July 1942
- Running time: 108 minutes
- Country: Mexico
- Language: Spanish

Alejandra is a 1942 Mexican historical drama film directed by José Benavides hijo and starring Arturo de Córdova, Sara García and Anita Blanch. The film's sets were designed by the art director Ramón Rodríguez Granada.

== Synopsis ==
After a baby is left on their doorstep one evening, Ricardo and his mother raise the girl, Alejandra. Ricardo doesn't realise that the girl is his own daughter from one of his love affairs.

== Cast ==
- Arturo de Córdova as Ricardo Ibáñez
- Sara García as Doña Elena
- Anita Blanch as Irene
- Susana Guízar as Alejandra
- Dolores Camarillo as Juana
- Julio Villarreal as Manuel
- Rafael Baledón as Mauricio
- José Morcillo as Don Roberto
- Antonio R. Frausto as Tomás
- Manuel Noriega as Cuñado de Elena
- Fanny Schiller as Rita
- Carolina Barret as Amiga de Ricardo
- Miguel Manzano as Amigo de Ricardo
- Salvador Quiroz as Amante de Irene

== Bibliography ==
- Castillo, Fernando Muñoz. Sara García. Clío, 1998.
- Solórzano, Enrique. Arturo de Cordova. Ediciones Populares, 1973.
