= Tito Davison =

Mexican film director

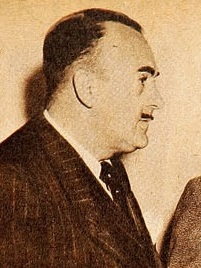
- Davison in 1953
- Born: 14 November 1912; Chillán, Chile
- Died: 21 March 1985 (aged 72); Mexico City, Mexico
- Occupations: Film director, screenwriter
- Years active: 1930–1982
- Spouse: June Marlowe

Tito Davison (14 November 1912 – 21 March 1985) was a Chilean-born Mexican film director and screenwriter. He directed more than 60 films between 1937 and 1982.

== Selected filmography ==
- Thus Is Life (1930)
- Shadows of Glory (1930)
- Murió el sargento Laprida (1937)
- Educating Niní (1940)
- He Who Died of Love (1945)
- ¡Ay qué rechula es Puebla! (1946)
- The Road to Sacramento (1946)
- Ramona (1946)
- I Am a Charro of Rancho Grande (1947)
- The Golden Boat (1947)
- Bel Ami (1947)
- The Private Life of Mark Antony and Cleopatra (1947)
- Midnight (1949)
- The Devil Is a Woman (1950)
- Women Without Tomorrow (1951)
- The Three Happy Friends (1952)
- Sister Alegría (1952)
- When I Leave (1954)
- The Price of Living (1954)
- La Dulce Enemiga (1957)
- The White Sister (1960)
- Love in the Shadows (1960)
- Corazón salvaje (1968)
- The Big Cube (1969)
