= Ernesto Cortázar =

Mexican film director, composer

- Born: 10 December 1897; Tampico, Tamaulipas, Mexico
- Died: 30 November 1953 (aged 55); Lagos de Moreno, Jalisco, Mexico
- Occupations: Director, Screenwriter, Composer
- Years active: 1937–1953 (film)

Ernesto Cortázar (1897–1953) was a Mexican film director, screenwriter, musician and composer. Cortázar was active during the Golden Age of Mexican Cinema. He was the father of Ernesto Cortázar II.

== Selected filmography ==
- The Queen of the River (1939)
- The League of Songs (1941)
- ¡Ay, Jalisco, no te rajes! (1941)
- The Rock of Souls (1943)
- Cuando habla el corazón (1943)
- Summer Hotel (1944)
- The Stronger Sex (1946)
- The Road to Sacramento (1946)
- Don't Marry My Wife (1947)
- The Golden Boat (1947)
- Juan Charrasqueado (1948)
- Marked Cards (1948)
- The Last Night (1948)
- Spurs of Gold (1948)
- Love in Every Port (1949)
- Treacherous (1950)
- Love for Love (1950)
- Corazón de fiera (1951)
- Radio Patrol (1951)
- The Children of Maria Morales (1952)
- Hot Rhumba (1952)
- Made for Each Other (1953)
- Star Without Light (1953)
- The Loving Women (1953)
- The Bachelors (1953)
- Se solicitan modelos (1954)
- When I Leave (1954)

== Bibliography ==
- Kolb-Neuhaus, Roberto. Silvestre Revueltas: Sounds of a Political Passion. Oxford University Press, 2023.
- Wilt, David E. The Mexican Filmography, 1916 through 2001. McFarland, 2024.
