= The Last Night (1948 film) =

1948 film

- Directed by: René Cardona
- Written by: René Cardona; Ernesto Cortázar; Ramón Pérez Peláez; Alfredo Ripstein Jr.
- Produced by: Jesús Grovas; Alfredo Ripstein Jr.
- Starring: Ramón Armengod; Rosita Quintana; Óscar Pulido
- Cinematography: Jack Draper
- Edited by: Carlos Savage
- Music by: Manuel Esperón
- Production companies: Alameda Films; Cinematográfica de Guadalajara
- Release date: 28 October 1948
- Running time: 90 minutes
- Country: Mexico
- Language: Spanish

The Last Night (Spanish: La última noche) is a 1948 Mexican drama film directed by René Cardona and starring Ramón Armengod, Rosita Quintana and Óscar Pulido. It was shot at the Azteca Studios in Mexico City. The film's sets were designed by the art director Luis Moya.

== Cast ==
- Ramón Armengod
- Rosita Quintana
- Óscar Pulido
- José Baviera
- Rafael Banquells
- Francisco Pando
- César del Campo
- Trío Tamaulipeco
- Araceli Julián
- Elena Julián
- Rosalía Julián
- Lolita Márquez
- Trío Janitzio
- Salvador Quiroz

== Bibliography ==
- Riera, Emilio García . Historia documental del cine mexicano: 1946–1948. Universidad de Guadalajara, 1992.
- Wilt, David E. Stereotyped Images of United States Citizens in Mexican Cinema, 1930-1990. University of Maryland at College Park, 1991.
