= Poor Devil (1940 film) =

- Directed by: José Benavides hijo
- Written by: José Benavides hijo, Carlos Orellana
- Starring: Fernando Soler
- Production company: Rey Soria Films
- Release date: 1940
- Country: Mexico
- Language: Spanish

Poor Devil (Spanish:Pobre diablo) is a 1940 Mexican comedy drama film directed by José Benavides hijo. It stars Fernando Soler and Pedro Armendáriz.

== Cast ==
- Fernando Soler
- Pedro Armendáriz
- José Escanero
- Conchita Gentil Arcos
- Raúl Guerrero
- Agustín Isunza
- Tito Novaro
- Carlos Orellana
- Manuel Pozos
- Humberto Rodríguez
- Manolita Saval
- Consuelo Segarra
- Virginia Serret
- Arturo Soto Rangel
- Paz Villegas
