= Voices of Spring (1947 film) =

1947 film

- Directed by: Jaime Salvador
- Written by: Alfonso Patiño Gómez; Jaime Salvador
- Produced by: Modesto Pascó
- Starring: Domingo Soler; Delia Magaña; Adalberto Martínez
- Cinematography: Raúl Martínez Solares
- Edited by: Gloria Schoemann
- Music by: Manuel Esperón
- Production company: Procimex
- Distributed by: Clasa-Mohme
- Release date: 17 July 1947
- Running time: 105 minutes
- Country: Mexico
- Language: Spanish

Voices of Spring (Spanish: Voces de primavera) is a 1947 Mexican musical comedy film directed by Jaime Salvador and starring Domingo Soler, Delia Magaña and Adalberto Martínez. It was shot at the Clasa Studios in Mexico City. The film's sets were designed by the art directors Manuel Fontanals and José Rodríguez Granada.

== Cast ==
- Domingo Soler as Don Lorenzo
- Delia Magaña as Esposa de Ligorio
- Adalberto Martínez as Ligorio
- Louise Burnette as Luisa
- Eduardo Lanz as Alberto
- Aurora Walker as Consuelo
- Pilar Mata as Doña Gertrudis
- Gloria Ríos as Joaquinita
- Ramón G. Larrea as Acreedor
- Alfredo Varela padre as Acreedor
- Ethel Maklen as Lupita
- Víctor Manuel Castro as Inocencio

== Bibliography ==
- Amador, María Luisa & Blanco, Jorge Ayala . Cartelera cinematográfica, 1940–1949. Centro Universitario de Estudios Cinematográficos, Universidad Nacional Autónoma de México, 1982.
- Gilabert, Rosa Peralt. Manuel Fontanals, escenógrafo: teatro, cine y exilio. Editorial Fundamentos, 2007.
