= ¡Ay qué rechula es Puebla! =

- Directed by: René Cardona
- Written by: Ernesto Cortázar, Tito Davison
- Starring: Antonio Badú, Sara García, Jorge Reyes
- Release date: 1946
- Country: Mexico
- Language: Spanish

¡Ay qué rechula es Puebla! is a 1946 Mexican film directed by René Cardona. It stars Antonio Badú, Sara García and Jorge Reyes.
