= I Am a Charro of Rancho Grande =

1947 Mexican musical comedy drama film

- Directed by: Joaquín Pardavé
- Written by: Leopoldo Baeza y Aceves; Tito Davison; Antonio Guzmán Aguilera
- Produced by: Óscar J. Brooks; Alfredo Ripstein Jr.
- Starring: Sofía Álvarez; Pedro Infante; René Cardona
- Cinematography: Jorge Stahl Jr.
- Edited by: Mario González
- Music by: Manuel Esperón
- Production company: Filmadora Méxicana
- Distributed by: Clasa-Mohme
- Release date: 6 November 1947
- Running time: 80 minutes
- Country: Mexico
- Language: Spanish

I Am a Charro of Rancho Grande (Spanish: Soy charro de Rancho Grande) is a 1947 Mexican musical comedy drama film directed by Joaquín Pardavé and starring Sofía Álvarez, Pedro Infante and René Cardona. It was shot at the Azteca Studios in Mexico City. The film's sets were designed by the art director Edward Fitzgerald. It was in the tradition of Ranchera films, popular during the Golden Age of Mexican Cinema.

== Synopsis ==
A charro goes to Mexico City where he encounters a glamorous woman who throws his wedding plans into disorder.

== Cast ==
- Sofía Álvarez as Cristina
- Pedro Infante as Antonio Aldama
- René Cardona as Felipe
- Fernando Soto "Mantequilla" as Olote
- Dolores Camarillo as Doña Martinita
- Joan Page as Kitty
- Conchita Carracedo as Esmeralda
- Lola Tinoco as Doña Eduviges
- Miguel Manzano as Locutor
- Hernán Vera as Gendarme
- Fernando Casanova as Invitado a fiesta
- Columba Domínguez as Chica cantando
- Lilia Prado as Chica cantando

== Bibliography ==
- Avila, Jaqueline. Cinesonidos: Film Music and National Identity During Mexico's Época de Oro. Oxford University Press, 2019.
- Riera, Emilio García . Historia documental del cine mexicano: 1946–1948. Universidad de Guadalajara, 1992.
