= Manuel Noriega (actor) =

Mexican actor, screenwriter, and film director

Manuel "Manolo" Noriega, (June 24, 1880 – August 12, 1961) was a Spanish-born Mexican stage and film actor, screenwriter, and film director.

Born Manuel Noriega Ruiz in Colombres, Spain, he worked in live theatre for many years, performing in his native Spain as well as in Mexico, Cuba and the United States. A pioneer in silent film, he made his first screen appearance in 1907. It is believed some of his early silent films have been lost, but his main body of work began in talkies in the early 1930s, performing in close to two hundred sound films. Noriega earned an Ariel Award nomination for "Best Actor in a minor role" for his performance in the 1946 film Pepita Jiménez.

Married to Hortensia Castañeda Avila, their daughter Carmen became a singer who married Tito Guízar.

Noriega died of gastric ulcer in Mexico City on August 12, 1961, and is buried at the Panteón Jardín in Mexico City.

== Selected filmography ==
- Heart of Gold (1923)
- The Mystery of the Ghastly Face (1935)
- These Men (1937)
- Poppy of the Road (1937)
- Huapango (1938)
- Here's the Point (1940)
- I Will Live Again (1940)
- To the Sound of the Marimba (1941)
- Jesusita in Chihuahua (1942)
- Alejandra (1942)
- Beautiful Michoacán (1943)
- El Ametralladora (1943)
- Father Morelos (1943)
- Les Misérables (1943)
- The Two Orphans (1944)
- A Woman's Diary (1944)
- Cruel Destiny (1944)
- Porfirio Díaz (1944)
- My Memories of Mexico (1944)
- The White Monk (1945)
- Twilight (1945)
- The Shack (1945)
- Symphony of Life (1946)
- The Operetta Queen (1946)
- Tragic Wedding (1946)
- It's Not Enough to Be a Charro (1946)
- Pepita Jiménez (1946)
- The Lost Child (1947)
- The Thief (1947)
- The Tiger of Jalisco (1947)
- Five Faces of Woman (1947)
- Fly Away, Young Man! (1947)
- The Shadow of the Bridge (1948)
- The Newlywed Wants a House (1948)
- The Desire (1948)
- The Genius (1948)
- The Fourth Commandment (1948)
- The Magician (1949)
- Wife or Lover (1950)
- What Has That Woman Done to You? (1951)
- María Montecristo (1951)
- The Guests of the Marquesa (1951)
- My Goddaughter's Difficulties (1951)
- Mexican Bus Ride (1952)
- Genius and Figure (1953)
- The Spot of the Family (1953)
- Tehuantepec (1954)
