= The Golden Boat (1947 film) =

1947 film

- Directed by: Joaquín Pardavé
- Written by: Leopoldo Baeza y Aceves; Ernesto Cortázar; Tito Davison; Jorge Ferretis; Carlos Orellana
- Produced by: Óscar J. Brooks; Alfredo Ripstein Jr.
- Starring: Pedro Infante; Sofía Álvarez; Carlos Orellana
- Cinematography: Jorge Stahl Jr.
- Edited by: Mario González
- Music by: Manuel Esperón
- Production company: Filmex
- Distributed by: Filmex
- Release date: 13 August 1947
- Running time: 84 minutes
- Country: Mexico
- Language: Spanish

The Golden Boat (Spanish: La barca de oro) is a 1947 Mexican musical comedy drama film directed by Joaquín Pardavé and starring Pedro Infante, Sofía Álvarez, and Carlos Orellana. This film marked the film debut of the actress Lilia Prado It was shot at the Azteca Studios in Mexico City. The film's sets were designed by the art director Edward Fitzgerald. It was in the tradition of Ranchera films, popular during the Golden Age of Mexican Cinema.

== Cast ==
- Pedro Infante as Lorenzo
- Sofía Álvarez as Chabela Vargas
- Carlos Orellana as Tío Laureano
- René Cardona as Ing. Carlos Millán
- Fernando Soto "Mantequilla" as Celedonio
- Nelly Montiel as Graciela
- Jorge Ancira as Luis
- Jorge Treviño as Chon
- Guillermo Moreno as Primitivo
- Jesús Graña as Don Braulio
- Alma Delia Fuentes as Chabela, niña
- Pedro Elviro as Don Ciriaco
- Lilia Prado as Sirvienta

== Bibliography ==
- Riera, Emilio García . Historia documental del cine mexicano: 1946–1948. Universidad de Guadalajara, 1992.
