= Caribbean Rose =

1946 film

- Directed by: José Benavides hijo
- Written by: Marco Aurelio Galindo
- Produced by: Mauricio de la Serna
- Starring: María Elena Marqués; Víctor Junco; Katy Jurado
- Cinematography: Agustín Martínez Solares
- Edited by: Jorge Bustos
- Music by: Manuel Esperón
- Distributed by: Transoceanic Film
- Release date: 10 January 1946
- Running time: 91 minutes
- Country: Mexico
- Language: Spanish

Caribbean Rose (Spanish: Rosa del Caribe) is a 1946 Mexican drama film directed by José Benavides hijo and starring María Elena Marqués, Víctor Junco and Katy Jurado. The film's sets were designed by the art directors Edward Fitzgerald and Ramón Rodríguez Granada.

== Cast ==
- María Elena Marqués as Rosa
- Víctor Junco as Capitán Eduardo Cisneros
- Katy Jurado as Marga
- Arturo Soto Rangel as Don Leoncio Barrada
- José Baviera as Bernhardt Luckner
- Rafael Alcayde as Capitán Trejo
- José Torvay as Largo
- Irma Torres as Rival de Rosa
- Luis Jiménez Morán as Nacho
- Jorge Narváez as Pípila
- Félix Medel as Anunciador
- Rita María Bauzá as Amiga de la rival
- Francisco Beal as Pueblerino
- Stephen Berne as Marinero
- Roberto Cañedo as Cargador
- Leonor Gómez as Pueblerina
- Humberto Rodríguez as Empleado de Luckner
- Enrique Zambrano as Marinero

== Bibliography ==
- Riera, Emilio García. Historia documental del cine mexicano: 1943-1945. Universidad de Guadalajara, 1992.
