= If I'm to Be Killed Tomorrow =

1947 film

- Directed by: Miguel Zacarías
- Written by: Miguel Zacarías
- Produced by: Jesús Grovas
- Starring: Sofía Álvarez; Pedro Infante; René Cardona
- Cinematography: Víctor Herrera
- Edited by: Jorge Bustos
- Music by: Manuel Esperón
- Production company: Producciónes Grovas
- Distributed by: CIFESA (Spain)
- Release date: 23 May 1947
- Running time: 113 minutes
- Country: Mexico
- Language: Spanish

If I'm to Be Killed Tomorrow (Spanish: Si me han de matar mañana) is a 1947 Mexican comedy film directed by Miguel Zacarías and starring Sofía Álvarez, Pedro Infante and René Cardona. It was shot at the Churubusco Studios in Mexico City. The film's sets were designed by the art director Vicente Petit. A Ranchera film, it was produced during the Golden Age of Mexican Cinema. The title comes from a shortening of the expression "If I'm to be killed tomorrow, better to get it over with today".

== Cast ==
- Sofía Álvarez as Lupe 'La Serrana'
- Pedro Infante as Ramiro del Campo
- René Cardona as Genovevo
- Armando Soto La Marina as Chicote
- Miguel Arenas as Don Servando Reyes
- Nelly Montiel as Fanny
- Miguel Inclán as Sebastián Rojas
- Gilberto González as José Dolores Chapa
- Alfonso Bedoya as Juan Palomo
- José Torvay as Esbirro de Genovevo
- Julio Ahuet as Esbirro de Genovevo
- Ceferino Silva as Esbirro de Ceferino
- Edmundo Espino as Benito
- Lupe Inclán as Dionisia
- Lucy de Roy as Consuelo
- Jorge Sareli as Paco

== Bibliography ==
- Avila, Jaqueline. Cinesonidos: Film Music and National Identity During Mexico's Época de Oro. Oxford University Press, 2019.
- Macías-González, Víctor M. & Rubenstein, Anne. Masculinity and Sexuality in Modern Mexico. UNM Press, 2012.
- Riera, Emilio García. Historia documental del cine mexicano: 1946–1948. Universidad de Guadalajara, 1992.
