= Ramona (1946 film) =

1946 film

- Directed by: Víctor Urruchúa
- Written by: Leopoldo Baeza y Aceves; Tito Davison
- Based on: Ramona; 1884 novel by Helen Hunt Jackson
- Produced by: Enrique Darszon
- Starring: Esther Fernández
- Cinematography: Jack Draper
- Edited by: Carlos Savage
- Music by: Manuel Esperón
- Production company: Promex
- Release date: 11 July 1946
- Running time: 93 minutes
- Country: Mexico
- Language: Spanish

Ramona is a 1946 Mexican drama film directed by Víctor Urruchúa and starring Esther Fernández. It is an adaptation of the 1884 American novel Ramona by Helen Hunt Jackson. The film was both a financial and critical failure. The film's sets were designed by the art director Luis Moya.

== Cast ==
- Antonio Badú
- Juan Calvo
- Esther Fernández
- Rafael Icardo
- Cuquita Martinez
- Carlos Navarro
- Bernardo Sancristóbal
- Fanny Schiller

== Bibliography ==
- Ilan Stavans (ed.) Border Culture. ABC-CLIO, 2010.
