= Tragic Wedding =

1946 film

- Directed by: Gilberto Martínez Solares
- Written by: Mauricio Magdaleno; Gilberto Martínez Solares
- Starring: Roberto Silva; Miroslava; Ernesto Alonso
- Cinematography: Raúl Martínez Solares
- Edited by: Jorge Bustos
- Music by: Manuel Esperón
- Production company: Clasa Films Mundiales
- Release date: 30 May 1946
- Running time: 77 minutes
- Country: Mexico
- Language: Spanish

Tragic Wedding (Spanish:Bodas trágicas) is a 1946 Mexican drama film directed by Gilberto Martínez Solares and starring Roberto Silva, Miroslava and Ernesto Alonso. The film's sets were designed by the art director Jorge Fernandez.

The film marked the screen debut of Miroslava a Czech refugee who became one of the leading stars of Mexican Cinema.

== Cast ==
- Roberto Silva as Diego
- Miroslava as Amparo
- Ernesto Alonso as Octavio
- Estela Inda as Laura
- José Morcillo as Don Juan Manuel
- Antonio R. Frausto as Sostenes
- Alberto Torres Lapham as Don José Luis
- Lupe Inclán as Agustina
- Carolina Barret as Pepita
- Luis Beristáin as Carlos
- Manuel Noriega Ruiz as Padre Muñoz
- José Elías Moreno as Coronel Torres
- María Valdealde as Doña Engracia

== Bibliography ==
- Frank Javier Garcia Berumen. Brown Celluloid: 1894-1959. Vantage Press, 2003.
