= Luis Moya (art director) =

Mexican art director

- Occupation: Art director
- Years active: 1942–1955 (film)

Luis Moya was a Mexican art director. He designed the sets for around fifty films during his career which spanned the Golden age of Mexican cinema.

== Selected filmography ==
- Come on Ponciano (1937)
- Marvels of the Bull Ring (1943)
- Father Morelos (1943)
- Lightning in the South (1943)
- A Woman's Diary (1944)
- My Memories of Mexico (1944)
- Ramona (1946)
- The Operetta Queen (1946)
- The Private Life of Mark Antony and Cleopatra (1947)
- Strange Obsession (1947)
- Marked Cards (1948)
- The Last Night (1948)
- The Bewitched House (1949)
- Lola Casanova (1949)
- The Great Madcap (1949)
- Gemma (1950)
- Streetwalker (1951)
- Here Comes Martin Corona (1952)

== Bibliography ==
- Cotter, Bob. The Mexican Masked Wrestler and Monster Filmography. McFarland & Company, 2005.
