= Armando Soto La Marina =

Mexican actor

- Born: 1 October 1909; Mexico City, Mexico
- Died: 20 March 1983 (aged 73); Mexico City, Mexico
- Other name: El Chicote
- Occupation: Actor
- Years active: 1936–1983 (film)

Armando Soto La Marina (1 October 1909–20 March 1983) was a Mexican film actor. He appeared in a large number of productions from the Golden Age of Mexican Cinema onwards. He was considered a rising star in the 1940s but his erratic alcohol-fuelled behaviour led to him being relegated to smaller, supporting roles.

== Selected filmography ==
- While Mexico Sleeps (1938)
- The Priest's Secret (1941)
- I'm a Real Mexican (1942)
- Wild Flower (1943)
- Mexicanos, al grito de guerra (1943)
- El Capitán Malacara (1945)
- It's Not Enough to Be a Charro (1946)
- If I'm to Be Killed Tomorrow (1947)
- The Tiger of Jalisco (1947)
- Marked Cards (1948)
- Jalisco Sings in Seville (1949)
- A Galician in Mexico (1949)
- Between Your Love and Heaven (1950)
- My Husband (1951)
- The Night Falls (1952)
- Here Are the Aguilares! (1957)
- Yo... el aventurero (1959)
- Dos hijos desobedientes (1960)
- Museo del horror (1964)
- Martín Romero El Rápido (1966)
- Los dos apóstoles (1966)
- El charro del misterio (1980)
- El coyote emplumado (1983)

== Bibliography ==
- Gunckel, Colin, Horak, Jan-Christopher & Jarvinen, Lisa. Cinema Between Latin America and Los Angeles: Origins to 1960. Rutgers University Press, 2019.
- Yee, David. Informal Metropolis: Life on the Edge of Mexico City, 1940–1976. University of Nebraska, 2024.
