= Julia Alonso =

Mexican composer, organist, pianist, and teacher (1890–1977)

Julia Alonso Marquez (1890–1977) was a Mexican composer, organist, pianist, and teacher.

Born in Oaxaca, Oaxaca, Alonso studied at the Conservatorio Nacional de Música, and had achieved success as a composer by the age of twenty-five. After graduation she taught organ, piano, and composition at her alma mater. Her compositions include two symphonies, two suites for chamber orchestra, and two string quartets. She wrote a two-act opera, Tonantzin, on a subject from Mexican mythology; it was not performed during her lifetime. Alonso died in Mexico City.

The wife of then Mexican president Luis Echeverria Alvares, Ms. Maria Esther Zuno, came to her house to celebrate her birthday. On that day Julia wore her "China Poblana" dress, typical from Oaxaca, and gave a beautiful piano concert. A few days later. the Mexican newspaper EXELSIOR, published an article about Julia, praising her long life.

Julia's husband was Alfonso Carrillo Redondo.

Julia and Alfonso had three children: Juliano Carrillo Alonso, Blanca Rosa Carrillo Alonso and Emilio Carrillo Alonso.

Julia Alonso spoke several languages and her husband 11 languages. They had a house in Prado Churubusco, Mexico City, were they opened a school. They taught piano lessons and several languages, using the languages books written by Alfonso Carrillo.

Her husband Alfonso Carrillo Redondo was originally from Tucson Arizona and came to Mexico City looking for Julia's ex husband of Russian origin. Her previous husband had died, but this led to their friendship and later on they stayed together for the rest of their lives.

Her father was Manuel Alonso. He was of Spanish origin and fought in the "5 de Mayo" war. Her mother was Porfiria Marquez. She was also from Oaxaca, Oaxaca. Julia Alonso died March 5, 1977, at her home in Mexico City at the age of 87. Her remains are in "Panteon San Nicolas Tolentino".

Julia posed for the Mexican painter Diego Rivera. She is in a mural painted by Diego Rivera, above the stage of the Colegio de San Ildefonso in downtown Mexico City.
