= The Private Life of Mark Antony and Cleopatra =

1947 film

- Directed by: Roberto Gavaldón
- Written by: Leopoldo Baeza y Aceves; Tito Davison; Carlos A. Olivari; Sixto Pondal Ríos
- Produced by: Juan Parret; Alfredo Ripstein hijo Gregorio Walerstein
- Starring: Luis Sandrini; María Antonieta Pons; Víctor Junco
- Cinematography: José Ortiz Ramos
- Edited by: Carlos Savage
- Music by: Manuel Esperón
- Production company: Filmex
- Distributed by: Filmex
- Release date: 3 April 1947
- Running time: 97 minutes
- Country: Mexico
- Language: Spanish

The Private Life of Mark Antony and Cleopatra (Spanish: La vida íntima de Marco Antonio y Cleopatra) is a 1947 Mexican historical comedy-fantasy film directed by Roberto Gavaldón and starring Luis Sandrini, María Antonieta Pons and Víctor Junco. This film marke the acting debut of Fernando Casanova.

The film's sets were designed by the art director Luis Moya.

== Cast ==
- Luis Sandrini as Marco Antonio
- María Antonieta Pons as Cleopatra
- Víctor Junco as Octavio
- José Baviera as Julio
- Rafael Banquells as Marco Antonio
- Conchita Carracedo as Elena
- Carlos Villarías as Septimio
- Julián de Meriche as Ptolomeo
- Stephen Berne as Gladiador sin melena
- Fernando Casanova
- Julio Daneri as Guardia pretoriano
- Pedro Elviro as Ministro Egipcio
- Jesús Grana as Ministro Egipcio
- Juan José Laboriel as Esclavo
- Bertha Lehar as Señora Bernales
- Miguel Manzano as Policía Egipcio
- Francisco Pando as Miembro del senado
- Humberto Rodríguez as Ciudadano Romano
- Hernán Vera as Depilo

== Bibliography ==
- Elley, Derek. The Epic Film: Myth and History. Routledge, 2013.
