= Three Peasants on a Donkey =

1939 Mexican comedy film

- Directed by: José Benavides
- Written by: Alberto Novión (play); José Benavides; Carlos Orellana
- Produced by: Vicente Saisó Piquer
- Starring: Carlos Orellana; Sara García; Joaquín Pardavé
- Cinematography: Víctor Herrera
- Edited by: Mario del Rio
- Music by: Rafael de Paz
- Production company: Vicente Saisó Piquer Company
- Distributed by: Cinexport Distributing
- Release date: 26 October 1939
- Running time: 120 minutes
- Country: Mexico
- Language: Spanish

Three Peasants on a Donkey (Spanish: En un burro tres baturros) is a 1939 Mexican comedy film directed by José Benavides and is based on the play written by Alberto Novión. It stars Carlos Orellana and Sara García and is Pedro Infante's first film, appearing as an extra. Infante was also asked to overdub the singing for the jota, in place of Carlos López Moctezuma (who plays Alfredo). The film's sets were designed by the art director Carlos Toussaint.

== Plot ==
The film begins in Camarillas, the province of Teruel in the Aragon region of Spain. Three young men baturros (Aragonese peasants), Santiago, Isidro and El Perico, embark on a journey to Mexico to find better opportunities for themselves. Santiago and Isidro are initially unable to convince El Perico to join them on their trip as his wife is pregnant and he is in poor health. El Perico's wife dies diving birth to their daughter, La Pilar which causes him to decide at the last minute to go with them to Mexico. After they arrive in Mexico, El Perico becomes ill, and just before dying he makes Santiago promise to be a father to La Pilar. Santiago and Isidro send for the girlfriends, Manuela and Antonia and marrying them by proxy, who bring La Pilar with them to Mexico.

== Cast ==
- Carlos Orellana as Santiago Míguez
- Joaquín Pardavé as Isidro Herráiz
- José Pidal as El Perico
- Sara García as Manuela
- Carlos López Moctezuma as Alfredo
- Victoria Alonso as La Pilara
- Jorge Mairoz as Ramon
- Conchita Gentil Arcos as Antonia Teruel
- Elvia Salcedo as Laurita
- Joaquín Coss as Padre de Santiago
- Consuelo Segarra as Agustina - Madre de Isidro
- Alfredo Varela as Sirviente de Santiago
- Hernán Vera as Juéz en Aragón
- Víctor Junco as Amigo de Alfredo en juerga
- Victoria Arcos
- Manuel Pozos
- Pedro Infante
