= Sofía Álvarez (actress, born 1913) =

Colombian-Mexican actress and singer, born 1913

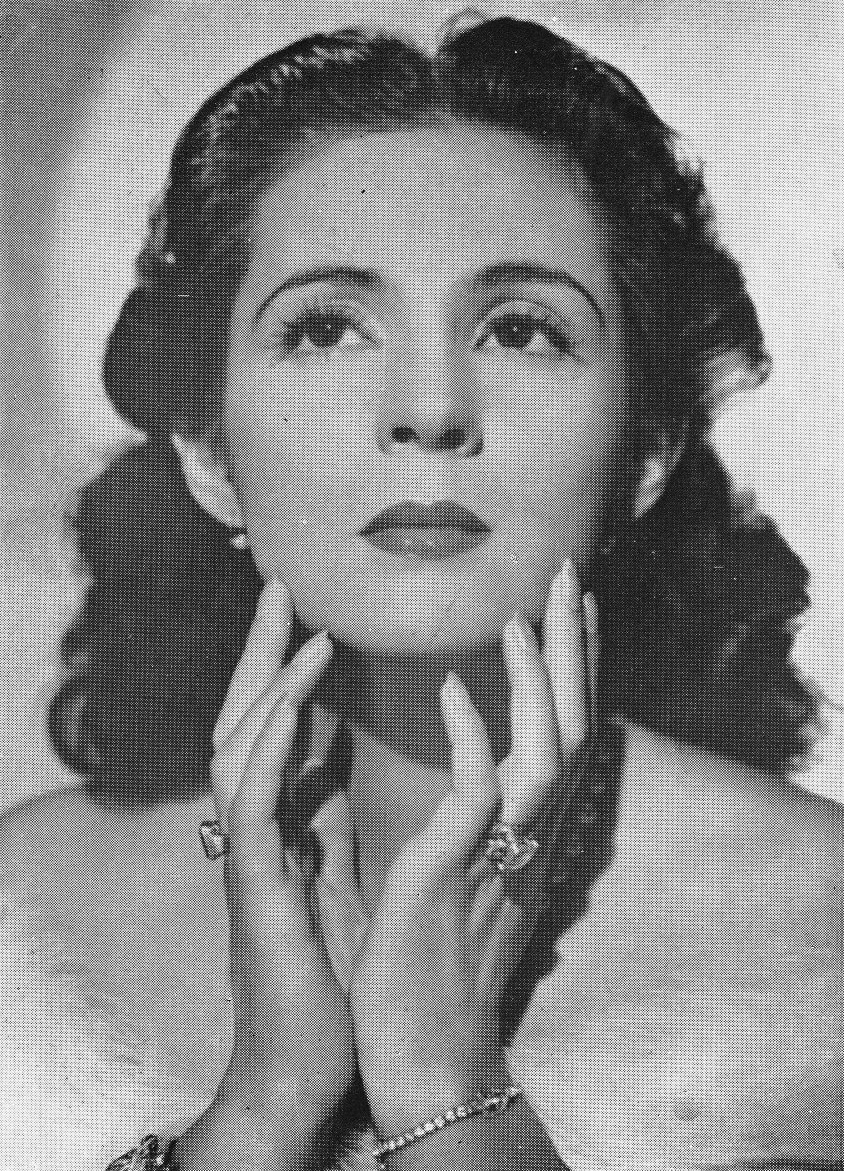
- Álvarez in 1954
- Born: Carmen Sofía Álvarez Caicedo; 23 May 1913; Bogotá, Colombia
- Died: 30 April 1985 (aged 71); Mexico City, Mexico
- Occupations: Actress; singer
- Relatives: Sofía Álvarez (granddaughter)

Carmen Sofía Álvarez Caicedo (23 May 1913 – 30 April 1985), known as Sofía Álvarez, was a Colombian-Mexican actress and singer, specialized in the musical genres of ranchera and mariachi.

== Life and career ==
Born and raised in Colombia, she moved with her family to Mexico in 1928. Her film debut was a small part, in the role of a prostitute in Santa (1930), the first talkie of Mexican cinema. Popularly known as the lady of the long braids, she enjoyed popularity during the 1930s and 1940s as an actress and singer. Subsequently, she performed with Mario Moreno Cantinflas in the popular film Ahí está el detalle (1940). In the 1940s, Álvarez is characterized by her interpretation of elegant ladies in films like El sombrero de tres picos and México de mis recuerdos (1943). She performed with the popular Pedro Infante in three films: Si me han de matar mañana (1946), La barca de oro (1947) and Soy charro de Rancho Grande (1947). One of her most celebrated films was La Reina de la Opereta (1945). In 1950 she left the cinema to continue as a radio singer. She returned to the cinema between 1957 and 1966, when she retired from acting. Her last film was El Gángster (1965), with Arturo de Córdova. She was noted for her excellent voice.

== Selected filmography ==
- Santa (1930)
- Martín Garatuza (1935)
- You're Missing the Point (1940)
- Flor de fango (1941)
- El sombrero de tres picos (1943)
- My Memories of Mexico (1944)
- A Woman's Diary (1944)
- The Operetta Queen (1946)
- If I'm to Be Killed Tomorrow (1947)
- The Golden Boat (1947)
- I Am a Charro of Rancho Grande (1947)
- Angels of the Arrabal (1949)
- El Gángster (1965)

== Bibliography ==
- Agrasánchez Jr., Rogelio (2001). Bellezas del cine mexicano/Beauties of Mexican Cinema. Archivo Fílmico Agrasánchez. ISBN 968-5077-11-8.
