= Manuel Esperón =

Mexican songwriter and composer (1911–2011)

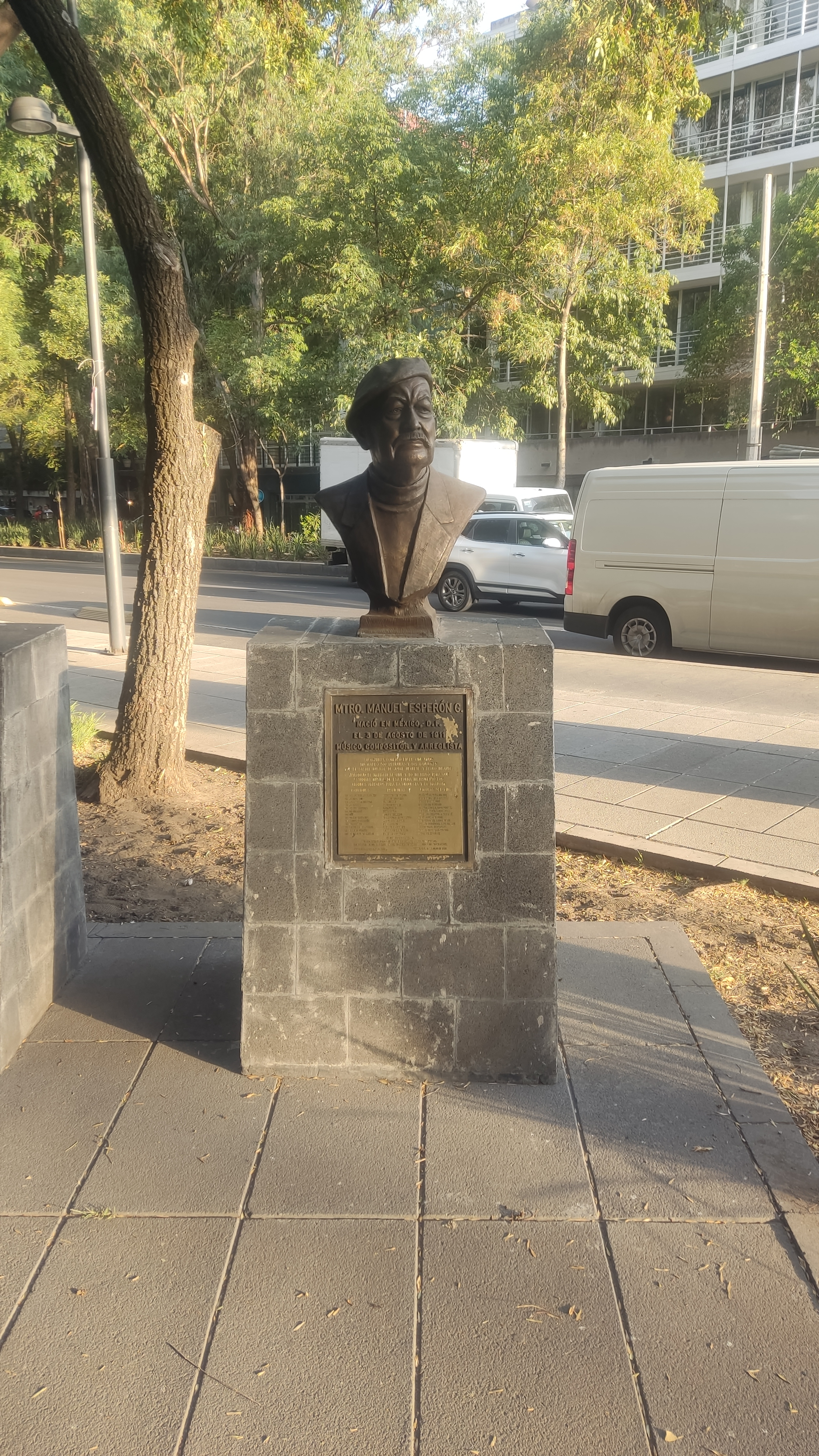
Bust in Plaza de los Compositores, Mexico City

Manuel Esperón González (August 3, 1911 – February 13, 2011) was a Mexican songwriter and composer. Along with the famous Mexican author Ernesto Cortazar, Esperón cowrote many songs for Mexican films, including "¡Ay, Jalisco, no te rajes!" for the 1941 film of the same name, "Cocula" for El Peñón de las Ánimas (The Rock of Souls) (1943), and "Amor con amor se paga" for Hay un niño en su futuro (1952). Other Esperón compositions have become Latin standards such as "Yo soy mexicano", "Noche plateada" and "No volveré", which was used in the first episode of the 2001 soap opera El juego de la vida. Among other performers, Pedro Infante, Los Panchos, and Jorge Negrete have made his songs well-known. His fame in the US derives from when his song The Three Caballeros (¡Ay, Jalisco no te Rajes!) was used in the Disney film The Three Caballeros (1945).

Esperón was born in Mexico City. He retired in 1987, although his songs continued to be used in filmmaking and television productions.

== Awards ==
In 1989, Esperón was awarded the National Prize for Arts for Art and Traditional Culture (de Artes y Tradiciones Populares). In 2001, he was given a tribute at the Palace of Fine Arts in the historical center of Mexico City. Until his death in 2011, he was the honorary President for life of the Society of Authors and Composers of Mexico.

== Selected filmography ==
- Come on Ponciano (1937)
- While Mexico Sleeps (1938)
- Father's Entanglements (1939)
- The League of Songs (1941)
- When the Stars Travel (1942)
- I Danced with Don Porfirio (1942)
- The Rock of Souls (1942)
- Alejandra (1942)
- María Eugenia (1943)
- The Rebel (1943)
- Land of Passions (1943)
- The Escape (1944)
- The Three Caballeros (1945)
- The Mulatta of Cordoba (1945)
- Adam, Eve and the Devil (1945)
- Love Makes Them Crazy (1946)
- Ramona (1946)
- Caribbean Rose (1946)
- Tragic Wedding (1946)
- It's Not Enough to Be a Charro (1946)
- The Associate (1946)
- If I'm to Be Killed Tomorrow (1947)
- I Am a Charro of Rancho Grande (1947)
- The Three Garcias (1947)
- Don't Marry My Wife (1947)
- The Golden Boat (1947)
- The Private Life of Mark Antony and Cleopatra (1947)
- Voices of Spring (1947)
- Flor de caña (1948)
- The Last Night (1948)
- The Perez Family (1949)
- Angels of the Arrabal (1949)
- Only Veracruz Is Beautiful (1949)
- A Galician in Mexico (1949)
- Dos pesos dejada (1949)
- Midnight (1949)
- The Woman of the Port (1949)
- If I Were Just Anyone (1950)
- Red Rain (1950)
- Between Your Love and Heaven (1950)
- You Shall Not Covet Thy Son's Wife (1950)
- When the Night Ends (1950)
- The Dangerous Age (1950)
- Immaculate (1950)
- Get Your Sandwiches Here (1951)
- Radio Patrol (1951)
- The Chicken Hawk (1951)
- The Three Happy Compadres (1952)
- The Beautiful Dreamer (1952)
- Hot Rhumba (1952)
- The Trace of Some Lips (1952)
- A Place Near Heaven (1952)
- The Three Happy Friends (1952)
- The Minister's Daughter (1952)
- Angélica (1952)
- Now I Am Rich (1952)
- The Vagabond (1953)
- You've Got Me By the Wing (1953)
- My Three Merry Widows (1953)
- Made for Each Other (1953)
- The Unknown Mariachi (1953)
- When I Leave (1954)
- Bluebeard (1955)
- Pablo and Carolina (1957)
- Puss Without Boots (1957)
- Every Child a Cross to Bear (1957)
- A Thousand and One Nights (1958)
- It Happened in Mexico (1958)
- The Life of Agustín Lara (1959)
- Love in the Shadows (1960)
- Three Black Angels (1960)
- The Partisan of Villa (1967)
