= Luis Aldás =

Argentine actor (1910–1990)

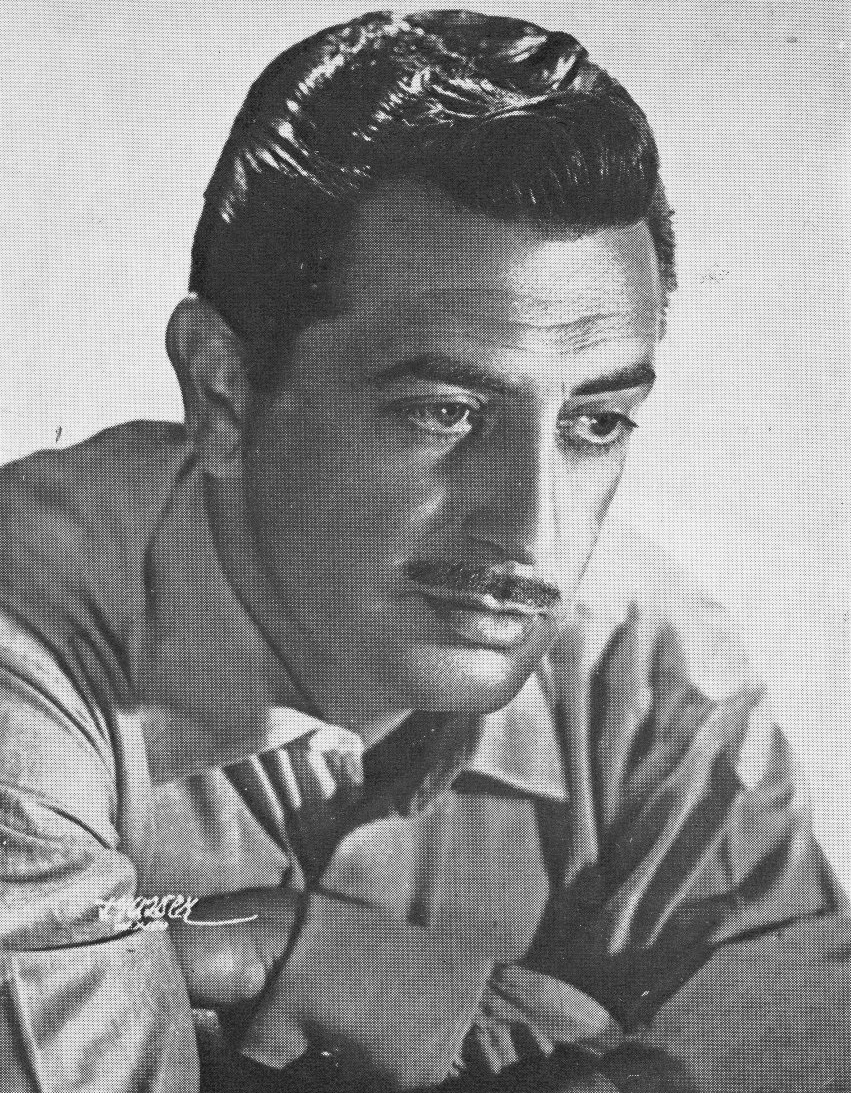
- Luis Aldás in 1954
- Born: 10 March 1910; Tandil, Argentina
- Died: 16 May 1990 (aged 80); Mexico City, Mexico
- Other name: Luis Aldás Luzarreta
- Occupation: Actor
- Years active: 1939 - 1987 (film)

Luis Aldás (10 March 1910 – 16 May 1990) was an Argentine film actor. He emigrated to Mexico and became a star during the Golden age of Mexican cinema. He appeared in more than fifty films during his career. Aldás was married four times. His wives included the Mexican actress Virginia Serret, the Brazilian actress Leonora Amar and the Mexican singer Lucy Gallardo.

== Selected filmography ==
- The Night of the Mayas (1939)
- The Coward (1939)
- Three Men of the River (1943)
- My Memories of Mexico (1944)
- A Woman's Diary (1944)
- He Who Died of Love (1945)
- The Devourer (1946)
- The Operetta Queen (1946)
- Strange Appointment (1947)
- Zorina (1949)
- My Wife Is Not Mine (1951)
- The Lovers (1951)
- I Don't Deny My Past (1952)
- The Boxer (1958)

== Bibliography ==
- Pitts, Michael. Western Movies: A Guide to 5,105 Feature Films. McFarland, 2012.
