= Paulo Antônio Paranaguá =

Brazilian film historian, journalist and author

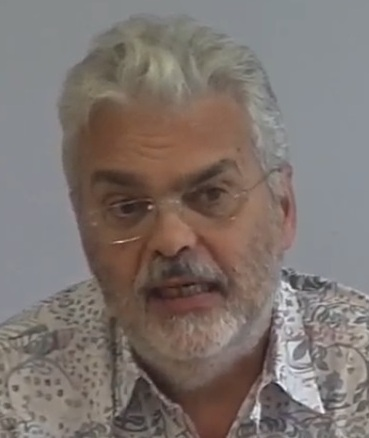
- Born: 1948 (age 77–78); Rio de Janeiro, Brazil
- Education: Sorbonne University
- Occupations: Film historian, journalist, author

Paulo Antônio Paranaguá is a Brazilian film historian, journalist and author. He is known for his research and publications on Latin American cinema, particularly for his comparative approach to the region's film histories.

== Biography ==
Paranaguá was born in Rio de Janeiro, Brazil. His mother, Glorinha Paranaguá, was an accessories designer associated with the Ipanema neighborhood. His father Paulo Henrique de Paranaguá was a diplomat. He grew up in Rio de Janeiro and spent part of his childhood in Madrid. In 1967, he joined the Brazilian surrealist film movement alongside Sérgio and Leila Lima.

In the late 1970s, Paranaguá moved to Barcelona, where he studied cinema with film historian Román Gubern. In 1982, he settled in Paris, where he has continued to work as a cultural journalist, film historian, festival organizer and curator. He also completed doctoral studies in film history at the Sorbonne.

Paranaguá has written approximately a dozen books on cinema. His scholarship examines the development of Latin American film through a comparative and historical perspective, within broader cultural and political contexts.

== Selected publications ==
- Cinéma brésilien 1970–1980 (1983)
- O cinema na América Latina (1985)
- Le cinéma cubain (1990)
- Mexican Cinema (1995)
- Arturo Ripstein: la espiral de la identidad (1997)
- Le cinéma en Amérique latine: le miroir éclaté, historiographie et comparatisme (2000)
- Luis Buñuel: Él. Estudio crítico (2001)
- Tradición y modernidad en el cine de América Latina (2003)
- Cine documental en América Latina (2003)
- A invenção do cinema brasileiro: modernismo em três tempos (2014)
