= René Cardona =

Cuban-Mexican filmmaker and actor (1905-1988)

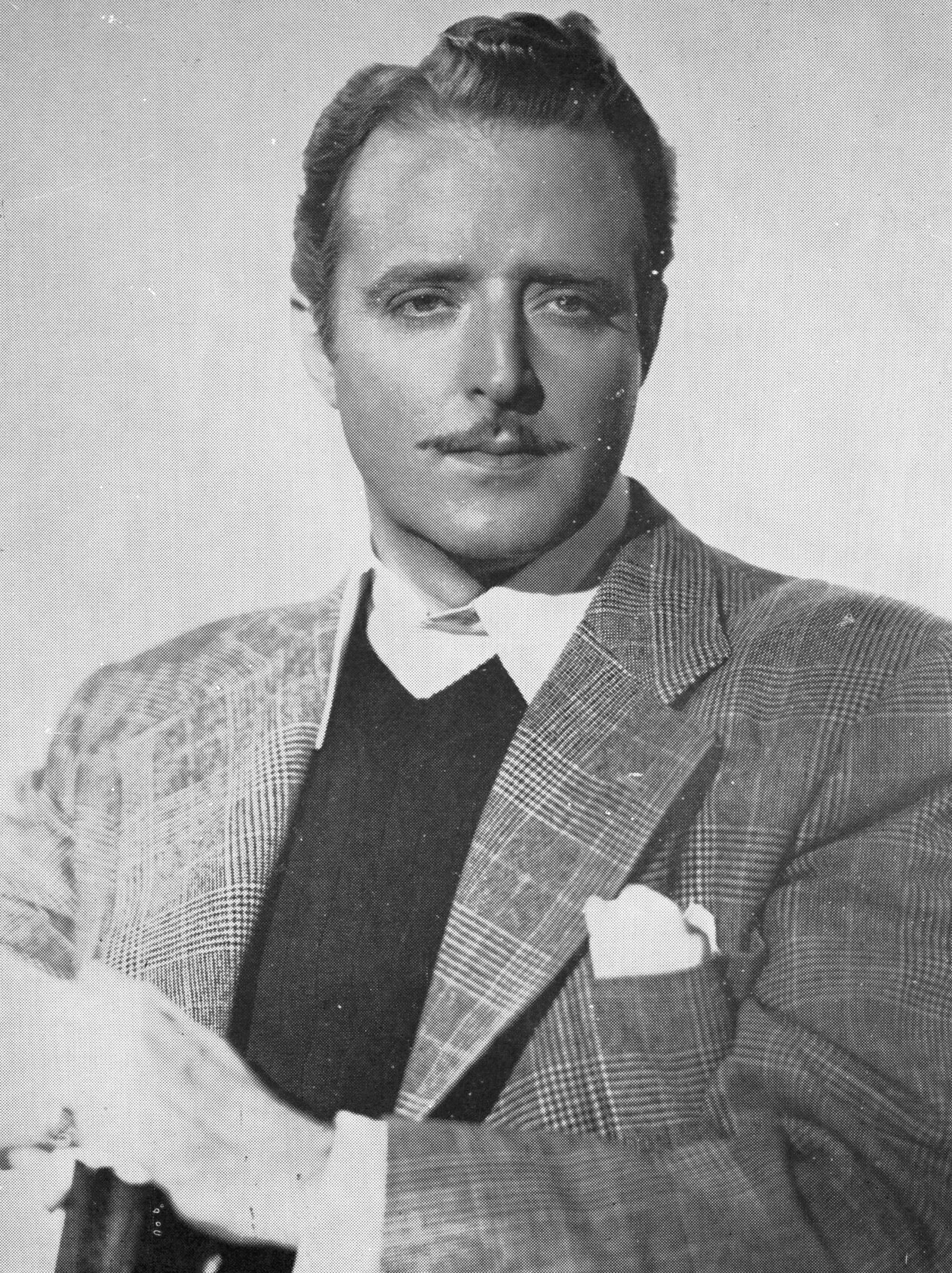
- Cardona in 1954
- Born: René Cardona André; October 8, 1905; Havana, Cuba
- Died: April 25, 1988 (aged 82); Mexico City, Mexico
- Occupations: Actor, producer, director, screenwriter, editor
- Years active: 1925–1988
- Children: René Cardona Jr.

René Cardona André (October 8, 1905 – April 25, 1988) was a Cuban-Mexican filmmaker and actor, who was prominent during part of the Golden Age of Mexican cinema. He was twice nominated for the Ariel Award for Best Supporting Actor.

== Biography ==
René Cardona was born in Havana, Cuba, on October 8, 1905, and began medical school in Cuba, but due to the political problems of the island, he and his family moved to New York City in 1926, where he continued his studies. Economic circumstances experienced by his family caused him to leave his studies. He befriended famous actor Rodolfo Valentino and obtained work as an extra in several films, until 1929 when he produced, wrote, directed and starred in the first Spanish-language film made in Hollywood, Sombras habaneras (Havana Shadows). He also had the opportunity to work in various positions in the film industry such as second assistant, technical advisor and first assistant director, and learned film and lighting technique. In 1932, he moved to Mexico, where he debuted as an actor and met Julieta Zacarías, sister of the director Miguel Zacarías, and soon after married her. His wife's support would be central to his career in Mexican cinema, in films Mano a mano (1932) directed by Ramón Peón and Sobre las olas (1933) directed by Zacarías. At this early stage as an actor, Cardona participated in three key Mexican films Marihuana (1936), El baúl macabro (1936) and Allá en el Rancho Grande (1936), which officially inaugurate the golden age of Mexican cinema and made stars of its protagonists: Esther Fernández, Tito Guízar, and Cardona.

=== Film directing ===
After the success of Allá en el Rancho Grande (1936), the following year Cardona decided to direct his first film in Mexico, Don Juan Tenorio, in which he also starred. Although it was not a success, it did not stop Cardona. He directed Allá en el Rancho Chico (1938) and La reina del río (1939), debuting two future stars: Blanca Estela Pavón in the first and Susana Guízar in the second. His 1939 El Cobardo starred Julián Soler.

Shortly after, he directed the stellar performances of Pedro Infante in Jesusita en Chihuahua (1942), and Germán Valdés "Tin Tan" in Hotel de verano (1944). In gratitude, both actors agreed to appear together only once in a Cardona film: También de dolor se canta (1952).

His career became so prolific that during 1937–1986, he directed more than one hundred films, in which he directed several of the biggest stars in Mexico. In the late fifties he made two films aimed at children, Pulgarcito (Tom Thumb) (1957) and Santa Claus (1959), which earned him several international awards. He directed many films in the 1960s which became cult classics, including Wrestling Women vs. the Aztec Mummy (1964), The Bat Woman (aka La mujer murciélago) (1968) and the horror film Night of the Bloody Apes (1969).

In the seventies, he produced and directed three films that achieved international success: La isla de los hombres solos (1974), considered Cardona's best film and based on the novel by José León Sánchez, El pequeño Robin Hood (1975), and Supervivientes de los Andes (1976).

Cardona directed his last film in 1982.

=== Acting ===
As an actor, René also achieved prestige, was a founding member of the ANDA and twice nominated for an Ariel Award, and acted in over 100 films; the most memorable are El secreto del sacerdote (1941), Caballería del imperio (1942), El peñón de las ánimas (1943), which marked the debut of María Félix, El abanico de Lady Windermere (1944), La barca de oro (1947), Soledad (1947) with Libertad Lamarque, Cartas marcadas (1948), with Pedro Infante and Marga López, La vorágine (1949) with Armando Calvo and Alicia Caro, Las tres perfectas casadas (1953) with Arturo de Córdova and Miroslava Stern among others, his career continued until shortly before his death and he even acted in a few films directed by his son, René Cardona Jr. such as La casa que arde de noche (1985).

=== Later years and death ===
His last screen appearances were in the television series Rosa salvaje and the film El fiscal de hierro (1989). He was bestowed a life honor by the national film library of Mexico on 15 December 1986 and received from El Heraldo de México in recognition of his 52 years of film work in the same year. He died in Mexico City on April 25, 1988.

== Selected filmography ==
- Carne de Cabaret (1931)
- The Mystery of the Ghastly Face (1935)
- The Coward (1939)
- The Queen of the River (1939)
- The Priest's Secret (1941)
- The Rock of Souls (1942)
- Jesusita in Chihuahua (1942)
- The Count of Monte Cristo (1942)
- Summer Hotel (1944)
- The Museum of Crime (1945)
- ¡Ay qué rechula es Puebla! (1946)
- The Associate (1946)
- The Prince of the Desert (1947)
- Felipe Was Unfortunate (1947)
- If I'm to Be Killed Tomorrow (1947)
- I Am a Charro of Rancho Grande (1947)
- Chachita from Triana (1947)
- The Golden Boat (1947)
- Marked Cards (1948)
- The Last Night (1948)
- Red Rain (1950)
- Pompeyo el conquistador (1953)
- The Three Perfect Wives (1953)
- Black Ace (1954)
- To the Four Winds (1955)
- The New World (1957)
- Santa Claus (1959)
- Juan Polainas (1960)
- Doctor of Doom (1962)
- Wrestling Women vs. the Aztec Mummy (1964)
- Neutron Traps the Invisible Killers (1965)
- The Bat Woman (1968)
- Operación carambola (1968)
- Night of the Bloody Apes (1969)
- The Incredible Professor Zovek (1972)
- The Divine Caste (1973)
- La isla de los hombres solos (1974)
- El pequeño Robin Hood (1975)
- Survive! (1976)

== Awards and nominations ==
Ceremony	Year	Category	Work	Result
Ariel Awards	1955	Best Supporting Actor	¡Que seas feliz!	Nominated
Ariel Awards	1957	Best Supporting Actor	Un nuevo amanecer	Nominated
San Francisco International Film Festival	1959	Best International Family Film	Santa Claus	Won
