= Fernando Soler =

Mexican actor, director, screenwriter and producer (1896–1979)

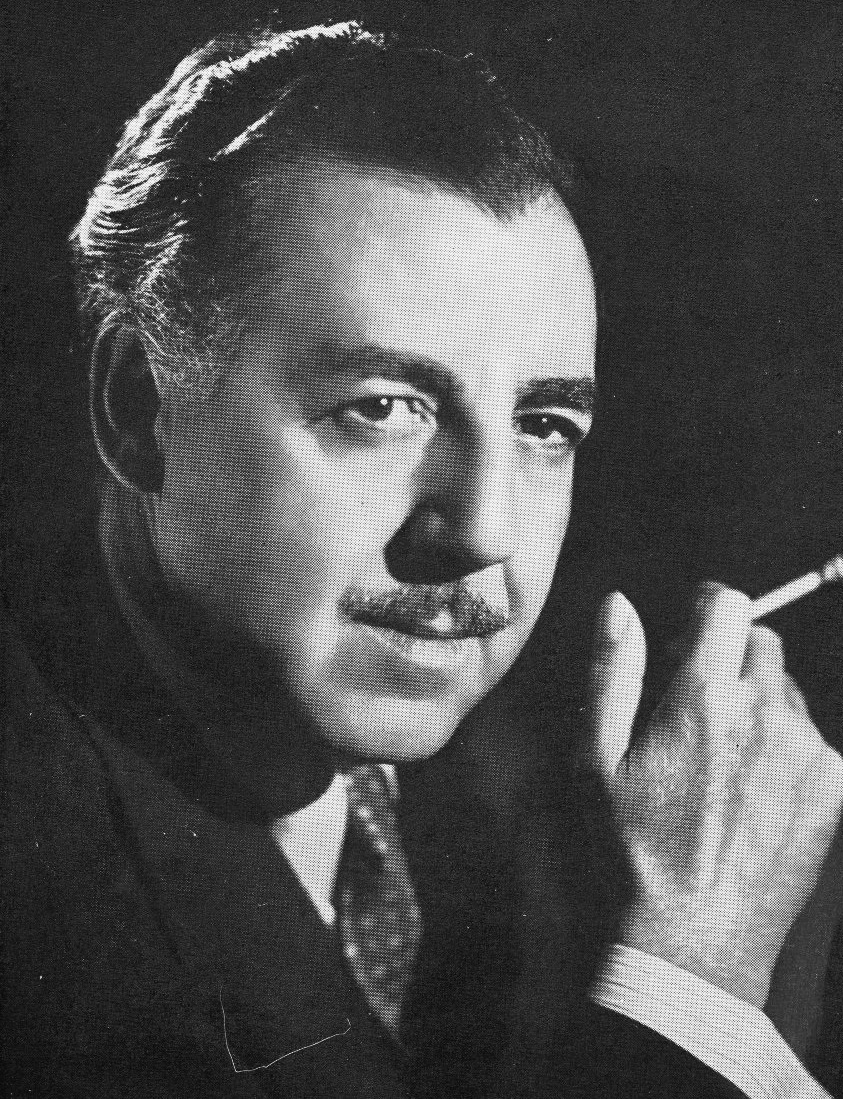
- Soler in 1954
- Born: Fernando Díaz Pavia; 24 May 1896; Saltillo, Coahuila, Mexico
- Died: 25 October 1979 (aged 83); Mexico City, Mexico
- Resting place: Panteón Jardín
- Other name: Don Fernando Soler
- Occupations: Actor; Director; Screenwriter; Producer
- Years active: 1915–1979
- Spouse: Sagra del Río

Fernando Díaz Pavia (24 May 1896 – 25 October 1979), better known by the stage name Fernando Soler, was a Mexican actor, director, screenwriter, and producer. He was considered one of the most important figures of the Golden Age of Mexican cinema. In his career spanning over sixty years, Soler appeared as an actor in more than one hundred motion pictures.

== Early life ==
Fernando Soler was born in Saltillo, Coahuila, as Fernando Díaz Pavía on 24 May 1896, to Domingo Díaz García, a Galician actor, and Irene Pavía Soler, a Valencian actress. His parents were Spanish theater actors who had come to Mexico with a theatrical company. He was the elder brother of Andrés Soler, Domingo Soler, Julián Soler, and Mercedes Soler. His family is known as the Soler Dynasty.

He was the uncle of the deceased actors Alejandro Ciangherotti and Fernando Luján.

== Selected filmography ==
- When Do You Commit Suicide? (1932)
- Por mis pistolas (1938)
- Poor Devil (1940)
- To the Sound of the Marimba (1941)
- El verdugo de Sevilla (1942)
- My Memories of Mexico (1944)
- The Operetta Queen (1946)
- The Great Madcap (1949)
- A Family Like Many Others (1949)
- The Black Sheep (1949)
- Las tandas del principal (1949)
- Yo quiero ser tonta (1950)
- Orange Blossom for Your Wedding (1950)
- You Shall Not Covet Thy Son's Wife (1950)
- The Cry of the Flesh (1951)
- Sensuality (1951)
- My Wife Is Not Mine (1951)
- So Loved Our Fathers (1964)
- Seis Días para Morir (La Rabia) (1967)
- Poor But Honest (1973)
