= Federico Ruiz (composer) =

Venezuelan composer (born 1948)

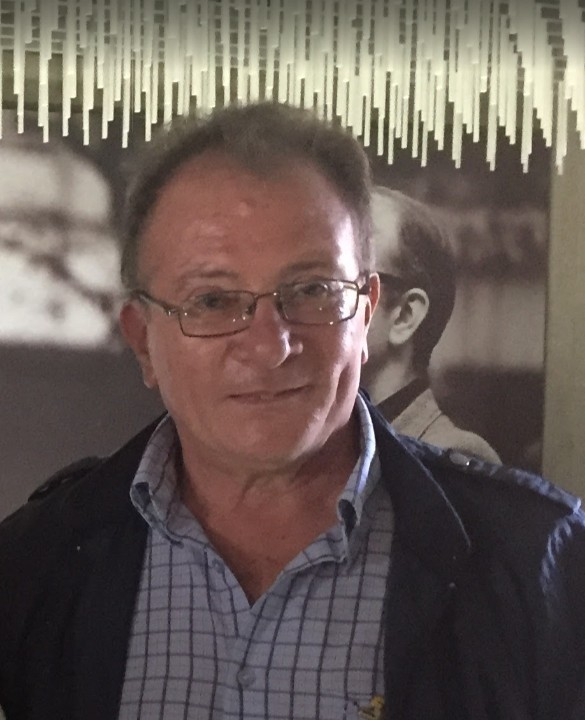
- Born: February 8, 1948 (age 78); Caracas, Venezuela
- Education: Escuela de Música José Ángel Lamas
- Occupation: Composer
- Awards: Premio Nacional de Música José Ángel Lamas

Federico Ruiz Hurtado (born February 8, 1948) is a Venezuelan composer, arranger, and arts administrator. He has composed in diverse genres including symphonic, chamber, and electroacoustic music.

== Biography ==
Ruiz was born in Caracas, Venezuela. He was a student at the José Ángel Lamas School of Music, where he studied composition with Primo Casale, Vicente Emilio Sojo and Evencio Castellanos; as well as contemporary compositional techniques with Giannis Ioannidis and Eduardo Kusnir. Ruiz graduated in 1974.

In 1976, Ruiz founded the Quinteto Cantaclaro, which consisted of members Carola Marcano, Inés Feo La Cruz, Efraín Arteaga, Gonzalo Peña, and Felipe Izcaray. His music for film has earned wide popularity in Venezuela and many of his works are part of the repertoire of ensembles in El Sistema.

Pianist Clara Rodríguez has championed and recorded Ruiz's music.
