= List of Mexican films of 1942 =

This is a list of films produced in the Mexican film industry and released in 1942

A list of the films produced in Mexico in 1942 in alphabetical order (see 1942 in film):

== 1942 ==
Title	Director	Cast	Genre	Notes
1942
Águila roja	Bob Curwood	Víctor Manuel Mendoza, Alicia Ortiz, Armando Soto La Marina	Adventure Comedy	
Alejandra	José Benavides	Arturo de Córdova, Sara García, Anita Blanch	Drama	
Allá en el bajio	Fernando Méndez	Raúl de Anda, Pedro Armendáriz, María Luisa Zea		
Amanecer ranchero	Raúl de Anda	Ramón Armengod, María Luisa Zea, Agustín Isunza	Comedy	
¡Así se quiere en Jalisco!	Fernando de Fuentes	Jorge Negrete, María Elena Marqués, Carlos López Moctezuma	Romance	
Caballería del imperio	Miguel Contreras Torres	Medea de Novara, Miliza Korjus, Joaquín Pardavé	Drama	
Carnaval en el trópico	Carlos Villatoro	Manuel Medel, Agustín Isunza, Eufrosina García	Comedy	
Casa de mujeres	Gabriel Soria	Luis G. Barreiro, José Baviera, Anita Blanch	Drama	
¡Cuando la tierra tembló!	Antonio Helú	Arturo de Córdova, Emilio Tuero, Carmen Hermosillo	Drama	
Cuando viajan las estrellas	Alberto Gout	Jorge Negrete, Ángel Garasa, Janet Alcoriza	Comedy	
Del rancho a la capital	Raúl de Anda	Domingo Soler, Susana Guízar, Pedro Armendáriz	Adventure Comedy	
Dos corazones y un tango	Mario del Río	Victoria Argota, Florencio Castelló, Carmen Conde	Drama	
Dos mexicanos en Sevilla	Carlos Orellana	Carlos Orellana, Sara García, Emilio Tuero	Comedy	
El baisano Jalil	Roberto Gavaldón, Joaquín Pardavé	Joaquín Pardavé, Sara García, Emilio Tuero	Comedy	
El barbero prodigioso	Fernando Soler	Fernando Soler, Adriana Lamar, Domingo Soler	Comedy	
El Conde de Montecristo	Roberto Gavaldón, Chano Urueta	Arturo de Córdova, Mapy Cortés, Rafael Baledón	Adventure	
El que tenga un amor	Carlos Orellana	Joaquín Pardavé, Manolita Saval, Emilio Tuero	Comedy	
El verdugo de Sevilla	Fernando Soler	Fernando Soler, Sara García, Domingo Soler	Comedy	
El ángel negro	Juan Bustillo Oro	Emilio Tuero, Marina Tamayo, Isabela Corona	Drama	
Esa mujer es la mía	Rafael E. Portas, Raphael J. Sevilla	Joaquín Pardavé, Manolita Saval, Julián Soler	Comedy	
Historia de un gran amor	Julio Bracho	Jorge Negrete, Domingo Soler, Gloria Marín	Drama	
I Danced with Don Porfirio	Gilberto Martínez Solares	Mapy Cortés, Joaquín Pardavé, Emilio Tuero	Comedy	
I'm a Real Mexican	Emilio Fernández	Pedro Armendariz, Janet Alcoriza, David Silva	Comedy thriller	
Jesusita en Chihuahua	René Cardona	Susana Guízar, René Cardona, Pedro Infante	Comedy	
Jesús de Nazareth	José Díaz Morales	José Cibrián, Adriana Lamar, Aurora Walker	Drama	1st Mexican Biblical Film
La abuelita	Raphael J. Sevilla	Sara García, Pituka de Foronda, David Silva	Comedy	
La canción del plateado	Francisco Elías	Antonio R. Frausto, José Macip, Juan José Martínez Casado	Adventure	
La epopeya del camino	Francisco Elías	Pedro Armendáriz, María Luisa Zea, Antonio R. Frausto	Romance	
La isla de la pasión	Emilio Fernández	David Silva, Isabela Corona, Pituka de Foronda	Drama	
La venganza del Charro Negro	Raúl de Anda	Raúl de Anda, Carlos López Moctezuma, Tito Junco	Adventure	
La última aventura de Chaflán	Manuel R. Ojeda	Luis G. Barreiro, Tony Díaz, Enrique García Álvarez	Comedy	
La Vírgen morena	Gabriel Soria	Amparo Morillo, Abel Salazar, Arturo Soto Rangel	Drama	
La Vírgen que forjó una patria	Julio Bracho	Ramón Novarro, Domingo Soler, Gloria Marín	Drama	
Las cinco noches de Adán	Gilberto Martínez Solares	Mapy Cortés, Domingo Soler, Tomás Perrín	Comedy	
Las tres viudas de papá	Miguel Zacarías	Sara García, Carolina Barret, Antonio R. Frausto	Comedy	
Los dos pilletes	Alfonso Patiño Gómez	Narciso Busquets, Polo Ortín, Consuelo Frank	Crime	
Los tres mosqueteros	Miguel M. Delgado	Cantinflas, Ángel Garasa, Janet Alcoriza	Parody	
Mi viuda alegre	Miguel M. Delgado	Luis G. Barreiro, Alfredo del Diestro, Ángel Garasa	Comedy	
Mil estudiantes y una muchacha	Juan Bustillo Oro	Enrique Herrera, Joaquín Pardavé, Marina Tamayo	Comedy	
Papá se desenreda	Miguel Zacarías	Sara García, Mapy Cortés, Carlos López Moctezuma	Comedy	
Papá se enreda otra vez	Miguel Zacarías	Leopoldo Ortín, Sara García, Virginia Serret	Comedy	
¿Quién te quiere a ti?	Rolando Aguilar	Joaquín Pardavé, Isabelita Blanch, Arturo de Córdova	Comedy	
Regalo de Reyes	Mario del Río	Sara García, David Silva, Miguel Ángel Ferriz	Drama	
Secreto eterno	Carlos Orellana	Marina Tamayo, David Silva, Matilde Palou	Drama	
Seda, sangre y sol	Fernando A. Rivero	Jorge Negrete, Gloria Marín, Florencio Castelló	Drama	
Siboney	Juan Orol	María Antonieta Pons, Juan Orol, Luisa María Morales, Óscar Lombardo		
Simón Bolívar	Miguel Contreras Torres	Julián Soler, Marina Tamayo, Carlos Orellana	Adventure	
Unidos por el eje	René Cardona	Carolina Barret, René Cardona, Fernando Cortés	Comedy	
Virgen de medianoche	Alejandro Galindo	Jorge Vélez, Manolita Saval, Ramón Vallarino	Crime	
