= Cuando los hijos se van (1941 film) =

1941 film by Juan Bustillo Oro

- Written by: Juan Bustillo Oro
- Starring: Sara García; Fernando Soler; Miguel Inclán
- Release dates: 1941 (Mexico); 1943 (U.S.)
- Country: Mexico
- Language: Spanish

Cuando los hijos se van ("When The Children Leave") is a 1941 Mexican film directed by Juan Bustillo Oro. It stars Sara García and Fernando Soler as the protagonists and features Miguel Inclán as an especially odious villain. A later version, directed by Julián Soler was released in 1969 and also starred Fernando Soler.

== Plot ==
Don José and his wife Guadalupe live with their four adult children. Christmas is nearing and the youngest daughter Amalia puts the star on their tree, an annual tradition. They are frequently visited by their godfather, Casimiro, who brings gifts to the family. His visit is interrupted by the arrival of Don Claudio, whose wallet (containing 350 pesos) has been stolen. Don José finds the empty wallet in his son Raimundo's room. Paying the money back from his own limited savings, Don José vows to punish Raimundo, even though he has not been proven of the crime.

At their Christmas Eve dinner, Don José confronts Raimundo and he storms off. Guadalupe, believing his innocence, attempts to console him.

In short succession, his other three children, Amalia, Federico and José leave the house. Amalia decides to marry Don Claudio, a man much older than her. Federico has been promised a job in Mexico City by this same man. José has also been offered a job in Mexico City.

Pancho, another friend of Don José visits with his wife. José sneaks in and begins to kiss his wife, narrowly escapes being caught and blames these actions on Raimundo. Don José is enraged and Raimundo is banished from the house. Guadalupe pleads to say goodbye to him but is not allowed by Don José. Raimundo's girlfriend María breaks up with him and marries José.

At the next Christmas, with all the children gone, Don José, Guadalupe and Casimiro reflect on life and the destiny of children to grow up and leave. Months pass and Don José falls very ill. Casimiro brings them a radio with which they can listen to Raimundo's music, as he has become a popular baritone singer. Debt collectors arrive to collect their valuable possessions, and she pleads with them to let her have the radio for a few minutes to hear her son. The song is dedicated to his mother, and she (along with the workers seizing her belongings) are driven to tears.

Four years after leaving, José returns to his house with an urgent appeal for money as he must come up with five thousand pesos to resolve an accounting error at his business. Desperate for money, Guadalupe signs a blank sheet at a bank which allows the banker to give her an emergency loan. However, the banker copies the signature intending to charge her a much larger sum of twelve thousand pesos a month later.

Casimiro is sent to Mexico City to inform the children of the situation, but only Raimundo comes to their aid. However, he does not have all of the money. He takes his father's gun to the bank, along with the five thousand that was rightfully owed, and threatens the banker with the gun only for the banker to shoot him first. Raimundo knocks him unconscious and tears the paper with his mom's signature just as Don José arrives. He dies in Don José's arms just as he forgives him for exiling him.

The parents reflect on Raimundo's sacrifice, that his soul flows through the house. Her other children return for the next Christmas Eve dinner. Amalia (after being abandoned by her older husband) acknowledges her mistake. José has an emotional breakdown and realizes he is not worthy of sitting with his family seeing how his actions ended Raimundo. Their parents forgive them and teach them about how Jesus forgave everyone's sins. Amalia places the star on the tree.

== Cast ==
- Fernando Soler as Don José "Pepe" Rosales
- Sara García as Doña Guadalupe Rosales
- Joaquín Pardavé as Don Casimiro
- Emilio Tuero as Raymundo Rosales
- Marina Tamayo as Amalia Rosales
- Carlos López Moctezuma as José Rosales
- Miguel Inclán as Patricio Gómez
- Gloria Marín as Nini
- Antonio R. Frausto as Francisco Paz "Pancho"
- Luis G. Barreiro as Sebastián Ramos
- Alfredo Varela Jr. as Tomás Rosales
- Manolo Noriega as Don Claudio
- Blanca Rosa Otero as María
- Tony Díaz as Federico Rosales
- Chucho Monge as Antonio
- Humberto Rodríguez as Ramón, repartidor
- Ricardo Adalid as Luis
- Tío Polito (narrador)
- Adolfo Bernáldez (no acreditado)
- Enrique Carrillo as Cargador (no acreditado)
- Max Langler as Empleado de Patricio (no acreditado)
- Ramón Sánchez as Cargador (no acreditado)
