= Alfonso Bedoya =

Mexican actor

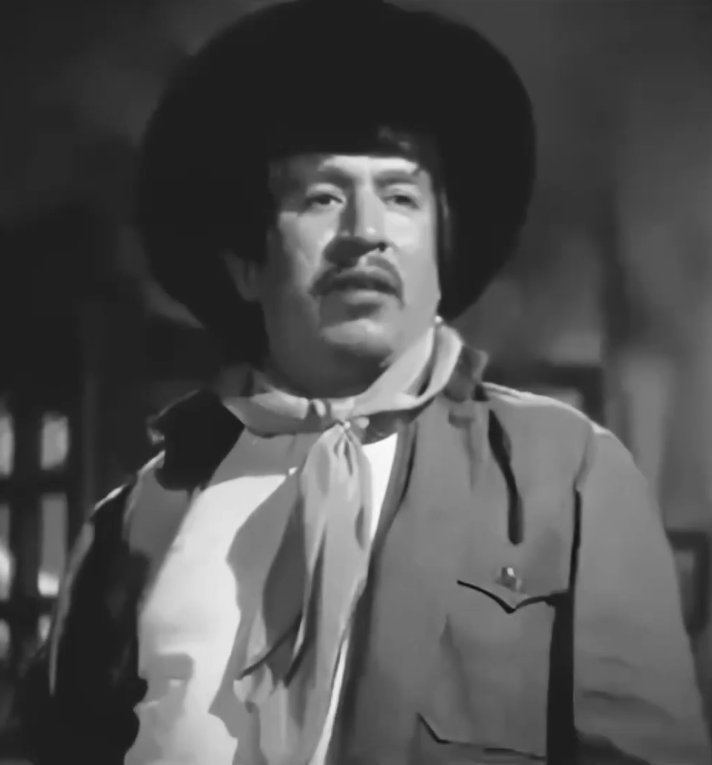
- Bedoya in Canaima (1945)
- Born: April 16, 1904; Vícam, Mexico
- Died: December 15, 1957 (aged 53); Mexico City, Mexico
- Other names: Alfonso Bedolla; Alfonso 'El Indio' Bedoya
- Years active: 1935–1957

Benito Alfonso Bedoya y Díaz de Guzmán (April 16, 1904 – December 15, 1957) was a Mexican actor who frequently appeared in U.S. films. He is best known for his role in The Treasure of the Sierra Madre, where he played a bandit leader and delivered the "stinking badges" line, which has been called one of the greatest movie quotes in history by the American Film Institute.

== Early life ==
Bedoya was born in the small town of Vícam, Sonora, Mexico, of Yaqui Indian heritage, to Norberto Bedoya Perea and Ignacia Díaz de Guzmán. He had a nomadic childhood upbringing in Mexico, traveling throughout the country with his parents and 19 siblings. At 14, he emigrated to the United States and was educated in Houston, Texas. He ran away from school and worked as a railroad section worker, dishwasher, waiter, and cotton picker.

== Film career ==
Bedoya found work as a character actor in the US and Mexican film industries in the 1930s to 1940s. During that time, he worked in over 175 Mexican films. His last movie, The Big Country, was released in 1958 after his death.

=== "Stinking badges" ===
Bedoya is best remembered for his role in John Huston's 1948 adventure film The Treasure of the Sierra Madre as "Gold Hat", the bandit leader. Bedoya's role includes the famous outburst: "Badges? We ain't got no badges. We don't need no badges. I don't have to show you any stinkin' badges!" The line was ranked number 36 on AFI's 100 Greatest Movie Quotes list, and it has been widely referenced and parodied in TV, film, music, and literature. The Treasure of the Sierra Madre was also ranked number 30 on AFI's 100 Years...100 Movies.

== Personal life ==
Bedoya married Gertrude Elizabeth Larky Karas on March 8, 1950, in Mexico City.

Bedoya completed filming The Big Country in November 1957, in California, and returned to Mexico City on December 8. Eight days later, after a night of partying with manicurist María Lucía Solana Martínez, Bedoya, 53, died of a heart attack in a Mexico City motel room.

== Filmography ==
Year	Title	Role	Notes
1935	Todo un hombre		
1937	Los chicos de la prensa		
1937	La llaga		
1937	Almas rebeldes		
1937	Adiós Nicanor	Servidor del Gavilan	Uncredited
1937	La madrina del Diablo	Cantinero	
1938	Ojos tapatios		
1938	La Adelita	Villista	
1938	Los bandidos de Río Frío	Espiridión	
1938	While Mexico Sleeps		
1938	Pescadores de perlas	Simón	
1938	La golondrina		Uncredited
1939	El capitán aventurero	Mesonero	Uncredited
1939	La China Hilaria	Isidro	
1940	Los olvidados de Dios	El Tejón	
1940	El gavilán	Pistoler	
1940	Los de abajo	El manteca	
1940	El charro Negro	Comandante de policía	
1941	El Zorro de Jalisco	Esbirro de Ernesto	Uncredited
1941	Rancho Alegre		
1941	Hasta que llovió en Sayula		
1941	El capitán Centellas		
1941	El rápido de las 9.15	Tripulación del tren	Uncredited
1941	The Unknown Policeman	Greñas	Uncredited
1942	La epopeya del camino		Uncredited
1942	La abuelita	Un obrero	
1942	Virgen de medianoche		
1942	Simón Bolívar	Conspirador Padilla	Uncredited
1942	The Three Musketeers	Gorila en cabaret	
1942	La Vírgen morena	Popoca	Uncredited
1942	I'm a Real Mexican		
1942	El baisano Jalil	Empleado de Jalil	Uncredited
1943	Dulce madre mía		
1943	María Eugenia		Uncredited
1943	Wild Flower	Teniente de Rogelio	
1943	El jorobado		
1943	Doña Bárbara	Peasant	
1943	Cuando habla el corazón	El Yaqui	
1943	The Rebel	Bandido	Uncredited
1944	The Headless Woman		
1944	Mis hijos	Borracho cantina	Uncredited
1944	Me ha besado un hombre		
1945	Me he de comer esa tuna	El Alacrán	
1945	Las Abandonadas	Gertrudis López, assistante	
1945	Club verde		
1945	'Como México no hay dos'!		
1945	El jagüey de las ruinas		
1945	Sendas del destino		
1945	Hasta que perdió Jalisco	Amigo de Jorge	
1945	Canaima	Cholo Parima (Pantoja)	
1945	Rosalinda	Cecina	
1946	It's Not Enough to Be a Charro	Peón	Uncredited
1946	La hija del payaso		
1947	Bells of San Fernando	Guard at the Pass	Uncredited
1947	The Tiger of Jalisco	Bandido	
1947	If I'm to Be Killed Tomorrow	El Nagual	
1947	Gran Casino	El Rayado	
1947	Albur de amor		
1947	The Pearl	Godfather	
1948	The Treasure of the Sierra Madre	Gold Hat	
1948	El último chinaco	Sabas	
1948	Angel in Exile	Ysidro Álvarez	
1948	Angel on the Amazon	Paulo	
1949	Streets of Laredo	Charley Calico	
1949	La casa embrujada	Vendedor de palomas	
1949	Border Incident	Cuchillo	
1950	Fortunes of Captain Blood	Carmilio	
1950	The Black Rose	Lu Chung	
1950	Furia roja	Ignacio 'El Nacho' López	
1951	Stronghold		
1951	Man in the Saddle	Cultus Charley	
1952	California Conquest	José Martínez	
1952	Por ellas aunque mal paguen	Don Lupe	
1953	Sombrero	Don Innocente	
1953	The Stranger Wore a Gun	Degas	
1954	Border River	Capt. Vargas	
1954	Ricochet Romance	Alfredo Gonzáles	
1954	The Black Pirates	Garza	
1955	Ten Wanted Men	Hermando	
1956	La doncella de piedra	Chuachuaima	
1958	The Big Country	Ramón Gutierrez	(final film role)
