= The Disobedient Son =

1945 film

- Directed by: Humberto Gómez Landero
- Written by: Humberto Gómez Landero
- Produced by: Alberto Santander
- Starring: Germán Valdés; Delia Magaña
- Cinematography: Víctor Herrera
- Edited by: José W. Bustos
- Music by: Armando Rosales
- Production companies: AS Films; Producciónes Grovas
- Distributed by: Azteca Films
- Release date: 15 November 1945
- Running time: 90 minutes
- Country: Mexico
- Language: Spanish

The Disobedient Son (Spanish: El hijo disobediente) is a 1945 Mexican musiccomedy film written and directed by Humberto Gómez Landero, and starring Germán Valdés "Tin-Tan", Delia Magaña, Cuquita Escobar and Natalia Ortiz. This film marked the film debut of the argentine actress Marga López, and it is the first in which Valdés had the leading role with his character of Tin-Tan. It was shot at the Azteca Studios in Mexico City. The film's sets were designed by the art director Vicente Petit.

== Cast ==
- Germán Valdés as Germán Rico / Tin Tan
- Marcelo Chávez as Marcelo Fortuna
- Cuquita Escobar as Cuca
- Delia Magaña as Socorro
- Miguel Arenas as Don Placido
- Tony Díaz as Ángel
- Natalia Ortiz as Doña Dadivosa Matafortuna
- Luis G. Barreiro as Delegado
- Rafael Icardo as Don Modesto Rojas
- Salvador Quiroz as Don Rogaciano Rico
- Alfredo Varela padre as Conductor tren
- Ramón G. Larrea as Dueño de cabaret
- Humberto Rodríguez
- Rita María Bauzá
- Marga López as Mesera del Cabaret
- Leonor Gómez as Mujer en cabaret

== Bibliography ==
- Maria Herrera-Sobek. Celebrating Latino Folklore: An Encyclopedia of Cultural Traditions. ABC-CLIO, 2012.
