= Only Veracruz Is Beautiful =

1949 film

- Directed by: Juan Bustillo Oro
- Written by: Juan Bustillo Oro; Humberto Gómez Landero
- Produced by: Juan Bustillo Oro; Gonzalo Elvira; Jesús Grovas
- Starring: Esther Fernández; Antonio Badú; Alfredo Varela
- Cinematography: Agustín Jiménez
- Edited by: José W. Bustos
- Music by: Manuel Esperón
- Production company: Producciónes Grovas
- Distributed by: Azteca Films
- Release date: 29 November 1949
- Running time: 98 minutes
- Country: Mexico
- Language: Spanish

Only Veracruz Is Beautiful (Spanish: Solo Veracruz es bello) is a 1949 Mexican comedy film directed by Juan Bustillo Oro and starring Esther Fernández, Antonio Badú and Alfredo Varela. It was shot at the Churubusco Studios in Mexico City. The film's sets were designed by the art director Carlos Toussaint.

== Cast ==
- Esther Fernández
- Antonio Badú as Ramón Fernández
- Alfredo Varela
- Rafael Lanzetta
- Agustín Isunza
- Delia Magaña
- Arturo Soto Rangel
- Lupe Inclán
- Ignacio Peón
- José Muñoz
- Salvador Quiroz
- Ramón Sánchez
- Humberto Rodríguez

== Bibliography ==
- Alfaro, Eduardo de la Vega. Microhistorias del cine en México. Universidad de Guadalajara, 2001.
- Agrasánchez, Rogelio . Cine Mexicano: Posters from the Golden Age, 1936-1956. Chronicle Books, 2001.
