= So Loved Our Fathers =

1964 film

- Directed by: Juan Bustillo Oro
- Written by: Juan Bustillo Oro; Humberto Gómez Landero
- Produced by: Rafael Pérez Grovas
- Starring: Fernando Soler; Ernestina Garfias; Joaquín Cordero
- Cinematography: Raúl Martínez Solares
- Edited by: Gloria Schoemann
- Music by: Raúl Lavista
- Production company: Tele Talia Films
- Release date: 16 July 1964
- Running time: 105 minutes
- Country: Mexico
- Language: Spanish

So Loved Our Fathers (Spanish: Así amaron nuestros padres) is a 1964 Mexican historical comedy film directed by Juan Bustillo Oro and starring Fernando Soler, Ernestina Garfias and Joaquín Cordero. The film's sets were designed by the art director Manuel Fontanals. Shot in Eastmancolor, it is a remake of the 1939 film In the Times of Don Porfirio.

== Synopsis ==
In the late nineteenth century an older man tries to sort out the romantic entanglements of a young woman, who is secretly his daughter.

== Cast ==
- Fernando Soler
- Ernestina Garfias
- Joaquín Cordero
- Fernando Soto
- Consuelo Frank
- Dolores Camarillo
- Conchita Gentil Arcos
- Estela Abreu
- Armando Acosta
- Ricardo Adalid
- Víctor Alcocer
- Regina Cardo
- Felipe del Castillo
- Agustín Isunza
- Concepción Martínez
- Rubén Márquez
- Pepe Nava
- José Peña
- Humberto Rodríguez
- Luis Alonso Rodríguez
- Mario Sevilla
- Pedro de la Torre
- Eduardo Zamarripa
- Guillermo Álvarez

== Bibliography ==
- Brill, Olaf (ed.) Expressionism in the Cinema. Edinburgh University Press, 2016.
- Stock, Anne Marie (ed.) Framing Latin American Cinema: Contemporary Critical Perspectives. University of Minnesota Press, 1997.
