= Penjamo (film) =

1953 film by Juan Bustillo Oro

- Directed by: Juan Bustillo Oro
- Written by: Juan Bustillo Oro; Carlos Damel; Camilo Darthés (play)
- Produced by: Jesús Grovas
- Starring: Joaquín Pardavé; Rosario Granados; Ángel Infante
- Cinematography: Víctor Herrera
- Edited by: Gloria Schoemann
- Music by: Manuel Esperón
- Production company: Cinematográfica Grovas
- Release date: 1 January 1953
- Running time: 120 minutes
- Country: Mexico
- Language: Spanish

Penjamo or The Guys from Penjamo (Spanish: Ésos de Pénjamo) is a 1953 Mexican musical comedy film directed by Juan Bustillo Oro and starring Joaquín Pardavé, Rosario Granados and Ángel Infante.

== Cast ==
- Joaquín Pardavé as Tío Porfirio
- Rosario Granados as Carmela
- Ángel Infante as Enrique
- Agustín Isunza as Faramento (firulais)
- Lupe Inclán as Pancha
- Esther Luquín as Amelia
- Armando Velasco as Doctor Robles
- José Muñoz as Don Santiago
- José Funes
- Maricruz Olivier as Martha Jiménez
- Leonor Gómez as Invitada al baile
- Pedro Infante as Cantante
- Pepe Nava as Empleado
- José Pardavé as Invitado al baile
- Humberto Rodríguez as Ponciano, mayordomo
- Ramón Sánchez as Margarito
- Hernán Vera as Cantinero

== Bibliography ==
- Rogelio Agrasánchez. Carteles de la época de oro del cine mexicano. Archivo Fílmico Agrasánchez, 1997.
