= To the Sound of the Marimba =

1941 film

- Directed by: Juan Bustillo Oro
- Written by: Augusto Martínez Olmedilla (play); Juan Bustillo Oro; Humberto Gómez Landero
- Produced by: Jesús Grovas
- Starring: Sara García; Fernando Soler; Marina Tamayo
- Cinematography: Jack Draper
- Edited by: Mario González
- Music by: Alberto Domínguez
- Production company: Grovas-Oro Films
- Distributed by: Clasa-Mohme
- Release date: 12 February 1941
- Running time: 137 minutes
- Country: Mexico
- Language: Spanish

To the Sound of the Marimba (Spanish: Al son de la marimba) is a 1941 Mexican musical comedy film directed by Juan Bustillo Oro and stars Sara García, Fernando Soler and Marina Tamayo. It was released during the Golden Age of Mexican Cinema. It was shot at the Clasa Studios in Mexico City. The film's sets were designed by the art director Carlos Toussaint.

== Synopsis ==
The plot centers around a once aristocratic but now impoverished family that hopes for their daughter (played by Marina Tamayo) to marry a rich rancher (played by Emilio Tuero), restoring their wealth. The rancher and one of his servants investigate whether the young woman truly loves him or just wants his money. The movie is noted for containing words and phrases associated with the state of Chiapas.

== Main cast ==
- Fernando Soler as Palemón Escobar
- Emilio Tuero as Don Felipe del Río
- Marina Tamayo as Margarita Escobar
- Joaquín Pardavé as Agapito Cuerda
- Sara García as Doña Cornelia Escobar
- Dolores Camarillo as Pita
- Virginia Serret as Sofía Escobar
- Alfredo Varela as Luis Escobar
- Joaquín Coss as Acreedor
- Manuel Noriega as Acreedor
- Salvador Quiroz as Acreedor
- Miguel Manzano as José María

== Bibliography ==
- Brill, Olaf (ed.) Expressionism in the Cinema. Edinburgh University Press, 19 Feb 2016.
