= Emilio Tuero =

Spanish-Mexican actor, producer, and singer

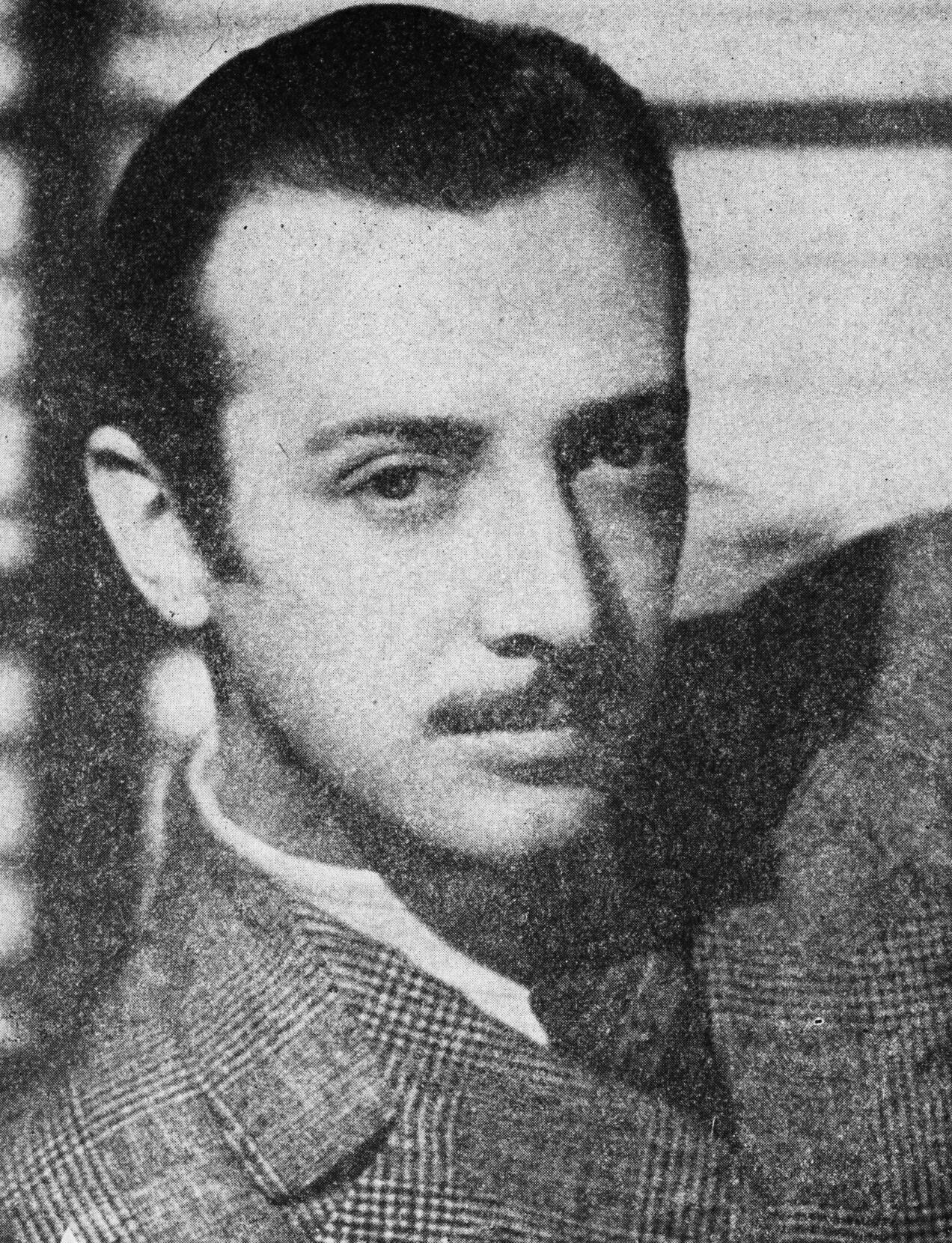
- Emilio Tuero in 1945
- Born: Emilio Tuero Cubillas; 5 April 1912; Argelia
- Died: 22 July 1971 (aged 59); Mexico City, Mexico
- Other names: Barítono de Argel
- Occupations: Actor; Producer; Singer
- Years active: 1929–1966
- Spouse: Marina Tamayo (m. 1942; died 1971)
- Children: 3

Emilio Tuero Cubillas (5 April 1912 – 22 July 1971), known as Emilio Tuero, was a Spanish-Mexican actor, producer, and singer. He was considered a popular star of the Golden Age of Mexican cinema.

== Filmography ==
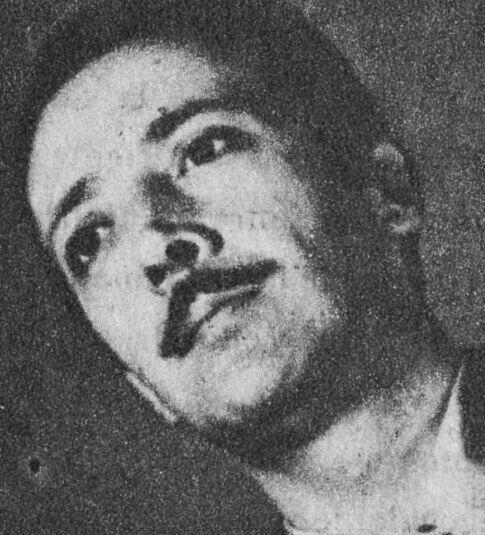
Emilio Tuero in 1945

- Cri Cri el grillito cantor (1963)
- Viva el amor (1956)
- The Bandits of Cold River (1956)
- After the Storm (1955)
- Historia de un amor (Cautivos del recuerdo) (1955)
- Private Secretary (1952)
- Beauty Salon (1951)
- Quinto patio (1950)
- Autumn and Spring (1949)
- Tuya para siempre (1948)
- The Desire (1948)
- María la O (1947)
- Dizziness (Vértigo) (1946)
- Ave de paso (1945)
- Tú eres la luz (1945)
- Club Verde (El recuerdo de un vals) (1944)
- El Recuerdo de aquella noche (1944)
- The Lady of the Camellias (1944)
- El Camino de los gatos (1943)
- No matarás (1943)
- Internado para señoritas (1943)
- Resurrection (1943)
- I Danced with Don Porfirio (1942)
- El baisano Jalil (1942)
- El ángel negro (1942)
- El que tenga un amor (1942)
- Mil estudiantes y una muchacha (1941)
- Noche de recién casados (1941)
- Dos mexicanos en Sevilla (1941)
- Cuando los hijos se van (1941)
- To the Sound of the Marimba (1941)
- ¡Cuando la tierra tembló! (1940)
- En tiempos de don Porfirio (Melodías de antaño) (1939)
- Miente y serás feliz (1939)
- Mujeres y toros (1939)
- Una luz en mi camino (1938)
- Juan Soldado (1938)
- El Rosario de Amozoc (1938)
- La India Bonita (1938)
- Tras la reja (1936)
- Mexicana (1935)
- La isla maldita (1934)
- El inocente (1956)
