= María Eugenia =

1943 Mexican film by Felipe Gregorio Castillo

- Directed by: Felipe Gregorio Castillo
- Written by: Felipe Gregorio Castillo
- Produced by: Felipe Gregorio Castillo
- Starring: María Félix; Manolita Saval; Rafael Baledón
- Cinematography: Víctor Herrera
- Edited by: José W. Bustos
- Music by: Manuel Esperón
- Production company: Clasa Films Mundiales
- Release date: 1 April 1943
- Running time: 101 minutes
- Country: Mexico
- Language: Spanish

María Eugenia is a 1943 Mexican drama film written and directed by Felipe Gregorio Castillo and starring María Félix, alongside Manolita Saval and Rafael Baledón. The film's sets were designed by the art director Manuel Fontanals.

== Cast ==
- María Félix as María Eugenia
- Manolita Saval as Raquel
- Rafael Baledón as Carlos
- Jorge Reyes as Ricardo
- Virginia Manzano as Julia
- Mimí Derba as Doña Virginia
- Eugenia Galindo as Doña Matilde
- Salvador Quiroz as Doctor
- Alejandro Cobo as Jefe de María
- Alfredo Varela as Martín
- Ignacio Peón as José María
- Consuelo Segarra as Rosa
- Carolina Barret as Mulata
- Antonio Bedolla as Pedro
- Julio Ahuet as Emeterio
- Toña la Negra
- Eva Beltri
- Trío Calaveras
- Son Clave de Oro
- Hermanos Huesca
- Alfonso Bedoya
- Roberto Cañedo

== Production ==
María Eugenia was the first film María Félix made after her film debut in El Peñón de las Ánimas. During filming, Félix caused a stir while shooting the opening scene of the film, which featured her in a white bathing suit, attracting publicity to Félix. It is the only film in Félix's filmography where she appeared in swimwear.

It was the only film directed by Felipe Gregorio Castillo, who afterwards became a film censor.

== Reception ==
In his book Más allá de las lágrimas: Espacios habitables en el cine clásico de México y Argentina, Isaac León Frías collects Emilio García Riera's view of the film, calling it a "terrible melodrama." The book Archivos de la Filmoteca refers to the film as a sign of how "the Mexican melodrama [was] so subject to conventions and norms" at the time, noting that the film was directed by a later film censor. María Félix herself would later refer to the film in her autobiography as "a film that had no other importance than to give me experience."
