= Cuando los hijos se van =

Cuando los hijos se van may refer to:

- Cuando los hijos se van (1941 film)
- Cuando los hijos se van (1969 film), film by Estudios Churubusco
- Cuando los hijos se van (telenovela)
