= Symphony of Life (film) =

- Directed by: Celestino Gorostiza
- Written by: Max Aub; María Gesa; Pablo González; Celestino Gorostiza
- Produced by: Alexander Salkind; Michael Salkind
- Cinematography: Víctor Herrera
- Edited by: Rafael Ceballos
- Music by: Rosalío Ramírez
- Release date: 12 April 1946
- Running time: 91 minutes
- Country: Mexico
- Language: Spanish

Symphony of Life (Spanish:Sinfonía de una vida) is a 1946 Mexican musical film directed as well as co-written by Celestino Gorostiza.

== Cast ==
- Jorge Arriaga
- Luis G. Barreiro
- Clifford Carr
- Roberto Cañedo
- Mary Christy as Singer
- Roberto Corell
- Gloria Cossío as Singer
- Pituka de Foronda
- Manuel Dondé
- Alma Delia Fuentes
- Rubén de Fuentes as Singer
- Enrique García Álvarez
- Agustín Isunza
- Óscar Jaimes
- Jorge Landeta
- Ramón G. Larrea
- Miguel Lerdo de Tejada as Orchestra Leader
- Héctor Mateos
- Jorge Mondragon
- José Elías Moreno
- Blanca Negri
- Manuel Noriega
- Fernando Ocampo as Singer
- Antonio Palacios
- Francisco Pando
- José Eduardo Pérez
- Salvador Quiroz
- Joaquín Roche hijo
- Alicia Rodríguez
- Luis G. Roldán as Singer
- Josefina Romagnoli
- Fanny Schiller
- Julián Soler
- Ángeles Soler
- José Torvay
- Ramón Vinay as Singer
- Elia Velez
- Fernando Wagner

== Bibliography ==
Rosa Peralta Gilabert. Manuel Fontanals, escenógrafo: teatro, cine y exilio. Editorial Fundamentos, 2007.
