= Amanda del Llano =

Mexican actress and singer

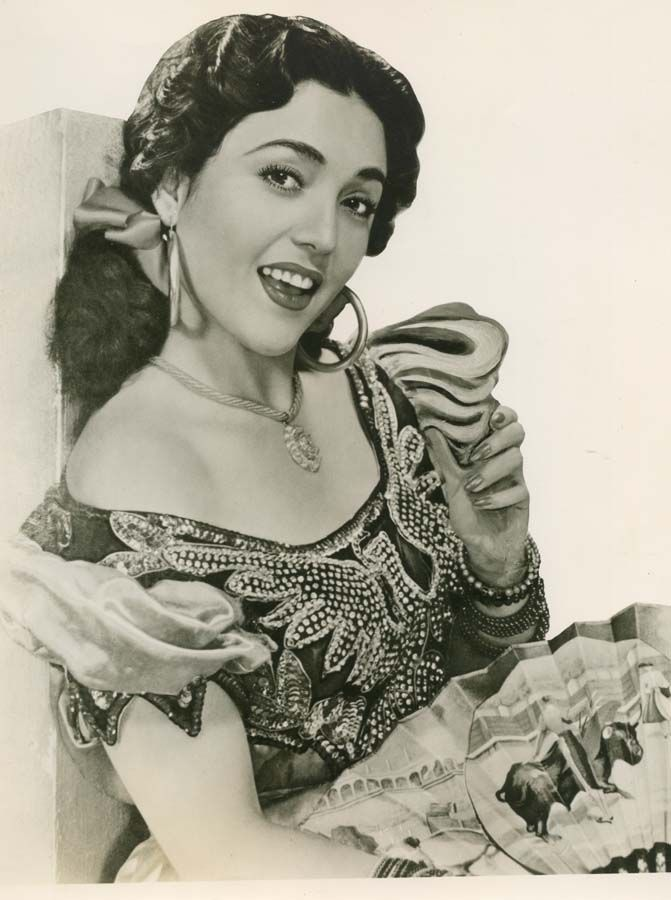
- Del Llano, c. 1940s
- Born: 20 June 1920; Tonalá Municipality, Chiapas, Mexico
- Died: 24 June 1964 (aged 44); Mexico City, Mexico
- Occupations: Actress, singer
- Years active: 1941–1963 (film)

Amanda del Llano (1920–1964) was a Mexican film actress and singer. For the RCA Víctor label, she recorded songs such as "A grito abierto", "Aquella", "Cuando salga la luna", "Cu cu rru cu cú paloma", "Échame a mí la culpa", "Estrellita marinera", "La noche de mi mal", "Una noche serena y oscura" and "Y ya".

== Selected filmography ==
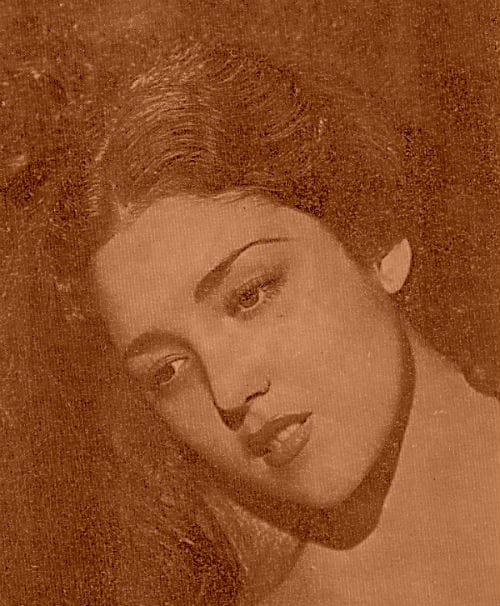
Del Llano in a publicity photograph, c. 1940s

- The Unknown Policeman (1941)
- The Eternal Secret (1942)
- The Black Angel (1942)
- Champion Without a Crown (1946)
- The Noiseless Dead (1946)
- Spurs of Gold (1948)
- Two of the Angry Life (1948)
- The Black Sheep (1949)
- You Shall Not Covet Thy Son's Wife (1950)
- Bluebeard (1955)
- De carne somos (1955)

== Bibliography ==
- Rogelio Agrasánchez. Guillermo Calles: A Biography of the Actor and Mexican Cinema Pioneer. McFarland, 2010.
