= Regalo de Reyes =

1942 Mexican film by Mario del Rio

- Directed by: Mario del Río
- Starring: Sara García; David Silva; Miguel Angel Ferriz; Pituka de Foronda
- Release date: 1942
- Country: Mexico
- Language: Spanish

Regalo de Reyes ("Christmas Present") is a 1942 Mexican film. It stars Sara García.
