= Maruja Grifell =

Mexican actress (1907–1968)

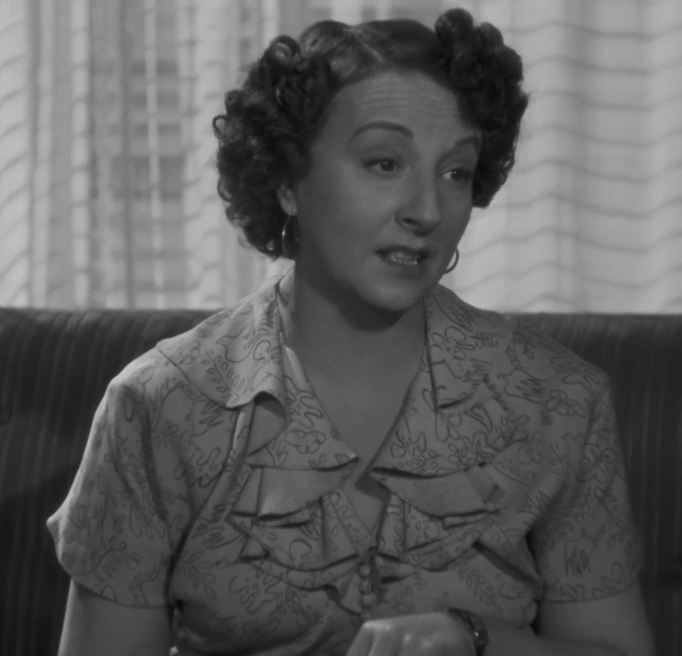
- Grifell in Bésame mucho (1945)
- Born: February 6, 1907; Tampico, Tamaulipas, Mexico
- Died: March 27, 1968 (aged 61); Mexico City, Mexico
- Occupation: Actress
- Years active: 1932–1968 (film)

Maruja Grifell (February 6, 1907 – March 27, 1968) was a Mexican film actress.

== Selected filmography ==
- Another Dawn (1943)
- The Lieutenant Nun (1944)
- La China poblana (1944)
- The Abandoned (1945)
- Adultery (1945)
- Bugambilia (1945)
- Cantaclaro (1946)
- Everybody's Woman (1946)
- Music Inside (1947)
- The Lost Child (1947)
- Fly Away, Young Man! (1947)
- You Have the Eyes of a Deadly Woman (1947)
- Adventure in the Night (1948)
- The Game Rooster (1948)
- Music, Poetry and Madness (1948)
- A Family Like Many Others (1949)
- Confessions of a Taxi Driver (1949)
- The Great Madcap (1949)
- Philip of Jesus (1949)
- Immaculate (1950)
- A Decent Woman (1950)
- Wife or Lover (1950)
- Lost (1950)
- My Favourite (1950)
- Get Your Sandwiches Here (1951)
- The Cry of the Flesh (1951)
- History of a Heart (1951)
- From the Can-Can to the Mambo (1951)
- The Shrew (1951)
- Woman Without Tears (1951)
- In the Flesh (1951)
- Acapulco (1952)
- Women Who Work (1953)
- You've Got Me By the Wing (1953)
- Seven Women (1953)
- El casto Susano (1954)
- Pablo and Carolina (1957)

== Bibliography ==
- Pilcher, Jeffrey M. Cantinflas and the Chaos of Mexican Modernity. Rowman & Littlefield, 2001.
