= The Black Angel (1942 film) =

- Directed by: Juan Bustillo Oro
- Written by: Juan Bustillo Oro; Humberto Gómez Landero
- Produced by: Juan Bustillo Oro; Jesús Grovas
- Starring: Emilio Tuero; Marina Tamayo; Isabela Corona; Joaquín Pardavé; Manolo Fábregas
- Cinematography: Jack Draper
- Edited by: Mario González
- Music by: Mario Ruiz Armengol
- Release date: 12 August 1942
- Running time: 126 minutes
- Country: Mexico
- Language: Spanish

The Black Angel (Spanish: El ángel negro) is a 1942 Mexican drama film directed by Juan Bustillo Oro, who co-wrote the screenplay with Humberto Gómez Landero and co-produced the film with Jesús Grovas.

== Plot ==
Although the widower Jorge Llorente warns Elisa that every woman he had loved mysteriously died, she marries him. The two live in a house where they employ Cristina as a housekeeper. Cristina is Jorge's half sister, who was born as a result of the rape of her mother by a crazy domestic worker. Cristina is hostile to Elisa, but when she becomes pregnant, Cristina changes her behavior and shows helpfulness until the son, who also gets the name Jorge, is born. After the birth of the child, Cristina convinces her brother that Elisa had been unfaithful to him. Jorge leaves his wife and takes his son, Elisa returns to live at her uncle's house in the city and Cristina raises the baby as if he were her son in Europe.

Eighteen years later, the elder Jorge decides to look for Elisa, and together they find out about Cristina's deception. When Jorge confronts his sister to know the motive of her evil, she confesses that for all those years she lived in love with her brother, and that she was so jealous that she had poisoned all of her brother's previous lovers. Cristina, in her anguish, poisons herself, and before she dies she asks the son she raised not to forget her, and tells him that that Jorge and Elisa will make him believe that she is not her mother.

Elisa and Jorge, without knowing about Cristina's last deception, decide to reveal the truth to their son, who immediately despises his true mother and asks her to leave the house. Before leaving, Elisa asks her son to accept a medal with the image of the Virgin of Guadalupe that she had given him in his childhood; her son takes it to throw it into the fireplace, but when he sees the medal, a memory from his childhood of his true mother comes to him, and runs into the arms of his mother. A huge oil painting of the portrait of Cristina that hung over the fireplace falls into the fire, and Elisa and Jorge hug each other with their son as they see how the portrait of the woman who separated them for years is slowly consumed in the fire.

== Cast ==
- Emilio Tuero as Jorge Llorente
- Marina Tamayo as Elisa
- Isabela Corona as Cristina
- Joaquín Pardavé as Don Luciano
- Manolo Fábregas as Jorge - adult (as Manolo Sánchez Navarro)
- Dolores Camarillo as Nana
- Roberto Meyer as Santiago
- Paz Villegas as Servanda
- Conchita Gentil Arcos as Doña Meche
- Rafael Icardo as Doctor Bustamante
- Tony Díaz as Miguel Conde (as Antonio Díaz)
- Max Langler as Jerónimo
- Carlos L. Cabello as Jorgito (as Carlitos Cabello)
- Salvador Quiroz as Andrés
- Humberto Rodríguez as Servant
- Amanda del Llano as Daughter of Doña Meche (uncredited)
- Rita Macedo as Daughter of Doña Meche (uncredited)

== Bibliography ==
- Mouesca, Jacqueline (2001). Erase una vez el cine. Lom Ediciones.
