= Get Your Sandwiches Here =

1951 Mexican film

- Directed by: Juan Bustillo Oro
- Written by: Juan Bustillo Oro
- Produced by: Jesús Grovas
- Starring: Sara García; Meche Barba; Carlos Orellana
- Cinematography: Domingo Carrillo
- Edited by: Gloria Schoemann
- Music by: Manuel Esperón
- Production company: Cinematográfica Grovas
- Distributed by: Cinematográfica Grovas
- Release date: 12 October 1951
- Running time: 111 minutes
- Country: Mexico
- Language: Spanish

Get Your Sandwiches Here (Spanish: Acá las tortas) is a 1951 Mexican drama film directed by Juan Bustillo Oro and starring Sara García, Meche Barba and Carlos Orellana. It was shot at the Churubusco Studios in Mexico City. The film's sets were designed by the art director Javier Torres Torija.

== Plot ==
An elderly couple that had worked all their life making a modest living out of selling "Tortas". Everything they had they gave to their three children so they could have a better future. Thanks to their sacrifice, two of them were able to study abroad and now because of the social status they had accomplished, were too ashamed of their parents and denied knowing them. The third child, had become an alcoholic and his whereabouts were unknown to his parents.

== Cast ==
- Sara García as Doña Dolores
- Meche Barba as María
- Carlos Orellana as Don Chente Mendoza
- Luis Beristáin as Vicente
- Lupe Inclán as Jacinta
- Queta Lavat as Lupe
- Fernando Casanova as Ricardo
- Jorge Treviño as Ponciano
- Tony Díaz as Eduardo Salgado
- Maruja Grifell as Doña Carlota
- Pepita Morillo as Polly
- Miguel Ángel López as Pancho
- Conchita Gentil Arcos as Doña Manuelita
- Lupe Carriles as Chole
- Chel López as Sr. Rosales
- Humberto Rodríguez as Doctor
- Ignacio Peón as Licenciado
- Salvador Quiroz as Don Carlos
- Enrique García Álvarez as Don José

== Bibliography ==
- Egan, Linda & Long, Mary K. (ed.) Mexico Reading the United States. Vanderbilt University Press, 2009.
- Noble, Andrea. Mexican National Cinema. Routledge, 2005.
