= Miguel Manzano =

Mexican actor (1907–1992)

- Born: Miguel Manzano; Guadalajara, Jalisco
- Died: Mexico City

Miguel Manzano (14 September 1907 in Guadalajara, Jalisco, Mexico – 21 January 1992 in Mexico City) was a Mexican actor during the Golden Age of Mexican cinema, winning an Ariel Award in 1985, for best supporting actor for the film Las glorias del gran Púas, where he played the role of Rubén Olivares' boxing trainer.

In 1986, he appeared in the famous Mexican telenovela, Tu o Nadie, playing Lucia Mendez's character's father.

== Selected filmography ==
- To the Sound of the Marimba (1941)
- Alejandra (1942)
- I Am a Charro of Rancho Grande (1947)
- The Private Life of Mark Antony and Cleopatra (1947)
- The Genius (1948)
- Two of the Angry Life (1948)
- The Magician (1949)
- Confessions of a Taxi Driver (1949)
- The Two Orphans (1950)
- Over the Waves (1950)
- Lost (1950)
- My General's Women (1951)
- Engagement Ring (1951)
- Kill Me Because I'm Dying! (1951)
- Tenement House (1951)
- They Say I'm a Communist (1951)
- The Atomic Fireman (1952)
- The Price of Living (1954)
- Drop the Curtain (1955)
- Father Against Son (1955)
- The Murderer X (1955)
- Every Child a Cross to Bear (1957)
- A Few Drinks (1958)
- The Miracle Roses (1960)
- El Analfabeto (1960)
- Love in the Shadows (1960)
- Lola the Truck Driver (1983)
