= The Noiseless Dead =

1946 film

- Directed by: Humberto Gómez Landero
- Written by: Humberto Gómez Landero
- Produced by: Jesús Grovas; Alberto Santander
- Starring: Germán Valdés; Amanda del Llano
- Cinematography: Víctor Herrera
- Edited by: José W. Bustos
- Music by: Armando Rosales
- Production companies: AS Films; Producciónes Grovas
- Release date: 19 September 1946
- Country: Mexico
- Language: Spanish

The Noiseless Dead (Spanish: Hay muertos que no hacen ruido) is a 1946 Mexican horror comedy film, written and directed by Humberto Gómez Landero and starring Germán Valdés "Tin-Tan" and Amanda del Llano.

== Cast ==
- Germán Valdés as Tin Tan
- Marcelo Chávez
- Amanda del Llano
- Tony Díaz
- Francisco Reiguera
- Eugenia Galindo
- Ángel T. Sala
- Humberto Rodríguez
- Ramón G. Larrea
- Ramiro Gamboa
- Jane Ross
- Héctor Mateos

== Bibliography ==
- Carlos Monsiváis & John Kraniauskas. Mexican Postcards. Verso, 1997.
