= It's Not Enough to Be a Charro =

1946 film

- Directed by: Juan Bustillo Oro
- Written by: Paulino Masip; Juan Bustillo Oro
- Produced by: Juan Bustillo Oro; Jesús Grovas
- Starring: Jorge Negrete; Lilia Michel; Armando Soto La Marina
- Cinematography: Víctor Herrera
- Edited by: José W. Bustos
- Music by: Manuel Esperón
- Production company: Producciónes Grovas
- Distributed by: Columbia Pictures
- Release date: 11 April 1946
- Running time: 85 minutes
- Country: Mexico
- Language: Spanish

It's Not Enough to Be a Charro (Spanish: No basta ser charro) is a 1946 Mexican musical comedy film directed by Juan Bustillo Oro and starring Jorge Negrete, Lilia Michel and Armando Soto La Marina. It was shot at the Clasa Studios in Mexico City. The film's sets were designed by the art director Vicente Petit. It was part of the tradition of Ranchera films, popular during the Golden Age of Mexican Cinema.

== Cast ==
- Jorge Negrete as Ramón Blanquet / Jorge Negrete
- Lilia Michel as Marta
- Armando Soto La Marina as Refugio
- Eugenia Galindo as Tía Tula
- Manuel Noriega as Don Antonio
- Antonio R. Frausto as Prospero, veterinario
- Trío Calaveras as Cantantes
- Trío Ascensio del Rio as Cantantes
- Trío Ruiz Armengol as Cantantes
- Hermanas Ruelas as Cantantes
- Cuarteto Melódico as Cantantes
- Alfonso Bedoya as Peón
- Carmelita González as Espectadora programa de radio

== Bibliography ==
- Avila, Jaqueline. Cinesonidos: Film Music and National Identity During Mexico's Época de Oro. Oxford University Press, 2019.
- Riera, Emilio García. Historia documental del cine mexicano: 1945. Ediciones Era, 1969.
