= Carlos Toussaint =

Mexican film director

- Born: 23 August 1901; Mexico City, Mexico
- Died: 7 March 1975 (aged 73); Mexico City, Mexico
- Other name: Carlos Antonio Toussaint Ritter
- Occupations: Screenwriter, Director, Journalist
- Years active: 1934–1964 (film)

Carlos Toussaint (1901–1975) was a Mexican film director and production designer. He was active during the Golden Age of Mexican Cinema and worked as art director on many productions. He also directed fourteen films between 1940 and 1964 including the Cantinflas short Cantinflas y su prima. He was married to the makeup artist Sara Mateos.

== Selected filmography ==
=== Art director ===
- Two Monks (1934)
- The Mystery of the Ghastly Face (1935)
- Poppy of the Road (1937)
- The Girl's Aunt (1938)
- Horse for Horse (1939)
- Every Madman to His Specialty (1939)
- Three Peasants on a Donkey (1939)
- You're Missing the Point (1940)
- To the Sound of the Marimba (1941)
- Father Gets Entangled Again (1942)
- Santa (1943)
- Madman and Vagabond (1946)
- The Three Garcias (1947)
- The Garcias Return (1947)
- Chachita from Triana (1947)
- Courtesan (1948)
- Two of the Angry Life (1948)
- Two Pesos Left (1949)
- The Woman I Lost (1949)
- The Black Sheep (1949)
- Only Veracruz Is Beautiful (1949)
- The Two Orphans (1950)
- You Shall Not Covet Thy Son's Wife (1950)

=== Director ===
- My Lupe and My Horse (1944)
- El crucifijo de piedra (1956)

== Bibliography ==
- Hershfield, Joanne; Maciel, David R. Mexico's Cinema: A Century of Film and Filmmakers. Rowman & Littlefield Publishers, 1999.
- Pilcher, Jeffrey M. Cantinflas and the Chaos of Mexican Modernity. Rowman & Littlefield, 2001.
