= The Lost Child (1947 film) =

- Directed by: Humberto Gómez Landero
- Written by: Humberto Gómez Landero; Octavio Novaro
- Produced by: Jesús Grovas
- Starring: Germán Valdés; Emilia Guiú
- Cinematography: Víctor Herrera
- Edited by: José W. Bustos
- Music by: Armando Rosales
- Production company: AS Films
- Release date: 26 September 1947
- Running time: 110 minutes
- Country: Mexico
- Language: Spanish

The Lost Child (Spanish:El niño perdido) is a 1947 Mexican comedy film directed and co-written by Humberto Gómez Landero and starring Germán Valdés "Tin-Tan" and Emilia Guiú.

== Cast ==
- Germán Valdés "Tin-Tan" as Agustín Peón Torre y Rey "Tincito"
- Marcelo Chávez as Pioquinto Chumacero; Quintín Caballero
- Miguel Arenas as Don Jacobo Peón
- Luis G. Barreiro as Ataúlfo
- Ramiro Gamboa as Narrator (voice)
- Conchita Gentil Arcos as Pita Torre
- Jesús Graña as Don Chucho, coreógrafo
- Maruja Grifell as Pura Torre
- Emilia Guiú as Estrella / Petra
- Lupe Inclán as Segunda, nana
- Ramón G. Larrea as Dueño de cabaret
- Raúl Lechuga as Empresario
- Manuel Noriega as Don Pepe
- Humberto Rodríguez as Humberto, mesero
- Aurora Ruiz as Severiana, sirvienta
- María Valdealde as Espectadora teatro

== Bibliography ==
- Carlos Monsiváis & John Kraniauskas. Mexican Postcards. Verso, 1997.
