= Delia Magaña =

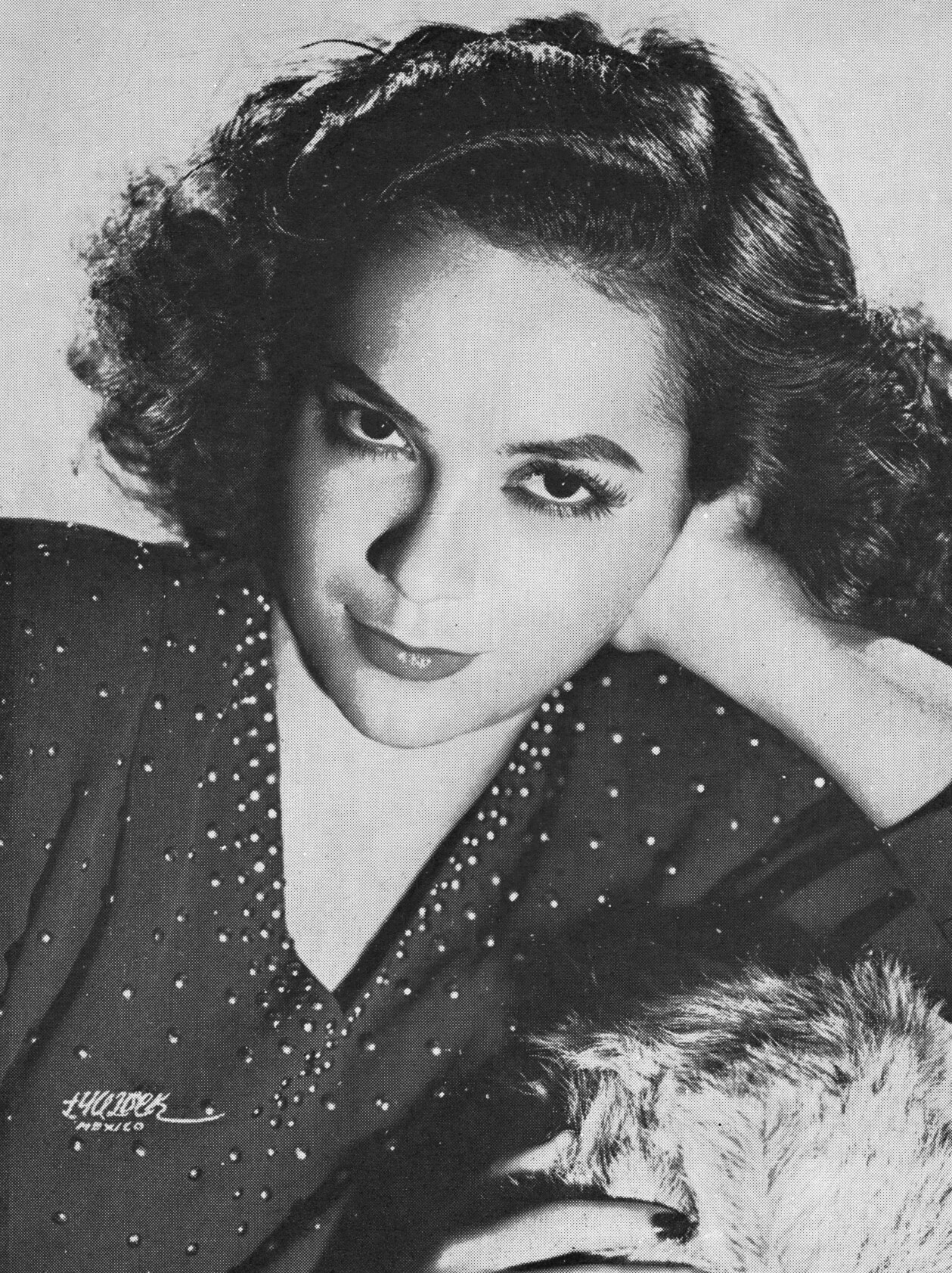
- Magaña in 1954
- Born: Gudelia Flores Magaña; February 2, 1903; Mexico City, Mexico
- Died: March 31, 1996 (age 93); Mexico City, Mexico
- Occupation: Actress
- Years active: 1930–1990

Delia Magaña (February 2, 1903 – March 31, 1996) was a Mexican film and television actress, singer, and dancer.

== Life ==
Although she started as a silent film actress, Magaña became best known for her comic supporting roles in her later years. For her 60 years in the film industry, as well as for contributing to the American cinema, Magaña's name and handprint are preserved in the sidewalk outside Mann's Chinese Theater in Hollywood, California.

== Films ==
She made 14 films in the United States and around 240 in her native Mexico. Magaña's first movies were silent films. She later appeared with such film stars as Pedro Infante and Mario Moreno, who went by the screen name of Cantinflas.

Fox Film producer Robert J. Flaherty spotted Magaña at the age of twenty. He was in Mexico City working on a motion picture. Among her numerous movies are El Hombre malo (1930), Cascarrabias (1930), Besame mucho (1945), Immaculada (1950), La Nina Popoff (1952), Los chiflados del rock and roll (1957), Satánico pandemonium (1975), Esa mi Raza (1977), and Lagunilla 2 (1983). Her last appearance in films was ¿Y tú... quién eres? (1990).

Magaña was once the guest of honor at a fiesta and dance presented by the United Spanish Speaking Societies. It was held in the Leamington Hotel, San Francisco, on October 27, 1946.

== Death ==
Delia Magaña died of pneumonia in Mexico City on March 31, 1996. She had been admitted sixteen days earlier. She was cremated. Survivors included a niece, Concepción de Teja Magaña.

== Selected filmography ==
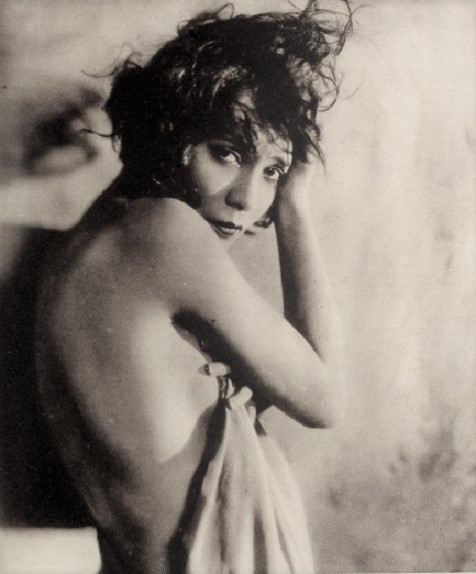
Magaña in 1929

- Thus is Life (1930)
- The War of the Pastries (1944)
- The Lieutenant Nun (1944)
- The Disobedient Son (1945)
- The Stronger Sex (1946)
- The Tiger of Jalisco (1947)
- Voices of Spring (1947)
- Nosotros los Pobres (1948)
- Corner Stop (1948)
- Two of the Angry Life (1948)
- Only Veracruz Is Beautiful (1949)
- Immaculate (1950)
- My Goddaughter's Difficulties (1951)
- Love Was Her Sin (1951)
- The Price of Living (1954)
