= Heads or Tails (1937 film) =

- Poster for Águila o sol
- Directed by: Arcady Boytler
- Written by: Arcady Boytler (adaptation); Guz Águila
- Produced by: Pedro Maus; Felipe Mier; Cinematográfica Internacional
- Starring: Mario Moreno «Cantinflas» Manuel Medel; Margarita Mora; Marina Tamayo
- Cinematography: Víctor Herrera
- Edited by: José Noriega
- Music by: Manuel Castro Padilla
- Release date: 1937
- Running time: 75 min.
- Country: Mexico
- Language: Spanish

Heads or Tails (Spanish:Águila o sol) is a 1937 drama film of the cinema of Mexico.

The film is in the public domain in both Mexico and the United States.

== Plot ==
At birth, three children are abandoned in a convent. They are Polito Sol and his siblings, Adriana and Carmelo Águila and they grow up to become the "Águila o Sol" trio. Many years later, Don Hipólito, Polito's father becomes rich and decides to search for his son. In the end, he finds Polito and the Aguila siblings.

== Cast ==
- Mario Moreno «Cantinflas» as Polito Sol
- Manuel Medel as Carmelo Águila
- Margarita Mora as Teresa
- Marina Tamayo as Adriana Águila
- Luis G. Barreiro as Castro
- Manuel Arvide as Hipólito Sol
- Margarita Sodi as young Adriana
- Jesús de la Mora as young Polito
- José Girón Torres as young Carmelo
- Dora Ceprano as Dora
- Ramón Rey as "El Gallego"
- Teresa Rojas
- Emma Vogel
- Blanca Rosa Otero
- José Elías Moreno
- Rafael Baledón
- Virginia Serret
- Julio Ahuet
- Toña la Negra
- Rafael Hernández
- Rafael Díaz
- Antonio Escobar
