= Two of the Angry Life =

1948 film

- Directed by: Juan Bustillo Oro
- Written by: Juan Bustillo Oro; Humberto Gómez Landero
- Produced by: Juan Bustillo Oro; Gonzalo Elvira; Jesús Grovas
- Starring: Manuel Palacios «Manolín» Estanislao Shilinsky; Amanda del Llano [Delia Magaña]]
- Cinematography: Agustín Jiménez
- Edited by: José W. Bustos
- Music by: Raúl Lavista
- Production company: Producciónes Grovas
- Release date: 8 April 1948
- Running time: 90 minutes
- Country: Mexico
- Language: Spanish

Two of the Angry Life (Spanish: Dos de la vida airada) is a 1948 Mexican comedy film directed by Juan Bustillo Oro and starring Manolín and Shilinsky, Amanda del Llano and Delia Magaña. It was shot at the Churubusco Studios in Mexico City. The film's sets were designed by the art director Carlos Toussaint.

== Cast ==
- Manuel Palacios as Manolín
- Estanislao Shilinsky as Shilinsky
- Amanda del Llano as Lolita
- Agustín Isunza as Don Laureano Palomar
- Delia Magaña as Socorro
- Óscar Pulido as Delegado
- Pedro Elviro as Pantaleon
- José Muñoz as Padre de muchachas
- Miguel Manzano as Jacinto
- Haydee Gracia as Mercedes
- Francisco Pando as Dueno de carpa
- Humberto Rodríguez as Notario

== Bibliography ==
- Riera, Emilio García . Historia documental del cine mexicano: 1946–1948. Universidad de Guadalajara, 1992.
- Wilt, David E. Stereotyped Images of United States Citizens in Mexican Cinema, 1930-1990. University of Maryland at College Park, 1991.
