= The Unknown Policeman =

1941 film

- Directed by: Miguel M. Delgado
- Written by: José F. Elizondo; Jaime Salvador; Miguel M. Delgado
- Produced by: Santiago Reachi
- Starring: Mario Moreno «Cantinflas» Mapy Cortés; Daniel "Chino" Herrera; Gloria Marín
- Cinematography: Gabriel Figueroa
- Edited by: Emilio Gómez Muriel
- Music by: Rafael Hernández
- Production company: Posa Films
- Distributed by: Columbia Films
- Release date: 23 October 1941
- Running time: 108 minutes
- Country: Mexico
- Language: Spanish

The Unknown Policeman (Spanish: El gendarme desconocido) is a 1941 Mexican comedy film directed and co-written by Miguel M. Delgado and starring Mario Moreno «Cantinflas», Mapy Cortés, Daniel "Chino" Herrera and Gloria Marín. It was shot at the Clasa Studios in Mexico City. The film's sets were designed by the art director Jorge Fernández.

== Cast ==
- Mario Moreno «Cantinflas» as El Chato / Agente 777
- Mapy Cortés as La criollita
- Daniel "Chino" Herrera as Comandante Bravo
- Gloria Marín as Amparo
- Julio Villarreal as Jefe de policía
- Agustín Isunza as Sargento
- Carlos López Moctezuma as Matias Luis Riquelme
- Luis G. Barreiro as Empleado hotel
- Consuelo Guerrero de Luna as doña Joaquinita
- Carolina Barret as Cabaretera
- Amparo Arozamena as Esposa de enfermo
- Estanislao Shilinsky as Gerente hotel
- Alfredo Varela as Bermúdez
- Eduardo Arozamena
- Alfonso Bedoya as Greñas
- Narciso Busquets as Niño
- Enrique Carrillo as Borracho en comisaria
- Roberto Cañedo as Extra
- Roberto Corell as Cliente Francés de hotel
- Joaquín Coss as Professor Melo
- Fernando Curiel as Empleado hotel
- Manuel Dondé as Amigo vagabundo
- Rafael Hernández
- Alfonso Jiménez
- Max Langler as Policía
- Amanda del Llano as Chica restaurante de hotel
- Rubén Márquez as Hombre bailando hotel
- Óscar Pulido
- Humberto Rodríguez as Vendedor de plumas
- Arturo Soto Rangel as Doctor
- Armando Velasco
- Pedro Elviro as Secuaz de Riquelme

== Bibliography ==
- Peter Standish & Steven M. Bell. Culture and Customs of Mexico. Greenwood Publishing Group, 2004.
