= Horse for Horse =

1939 film

- Directed by: Juan Bustillo Oro
- Written by: Juan Bustillo Oro; Humberto Gómez Landero
- Produced by: Jesús Grovas; Juan Bustillo Oro
- Starring: Leopoldo 'Chato' Ortín; Joaquín Pardavé; Consuelo Frank
- Cinematography: Jack Draper
- Edited by: Mario González
- Music by: Max Urban
- Production companies: Producciónes Grovas; Oro Films
- Release date: 19 July 1939
- Running time: 129 minutes
- Country: Mexico
- Language: Spanish

Horse for Horse (Spanish: Caballo a caballo) is a 1939 Mexican comedy film directed by Juan Bustillo Oro and starring Leopoldo 'Chato' Ortín, Joaquín Pardavé and Consuelo Frank. It was shot at the Clasa Studios in Mexico City. The film's sets were designed by the art director Carlos Toussaint.

== Cast ==
- Leopoldo 'Chato' Ortín as Inocente Cordero
- Joaquín Pardavé as Don Espiridion Espérides
- Consuelo Frank as Marta
- Enrique Herrera as Ángel Pastor
- Luis G. Barreiro as Administrador hotel
- Dolores Camarillo as Socorro, Doncella
- Joaquín Coss as Dueño carro robado
- Agustín Isunza as Comisario
- Gilberto González as Alberto
- Pilar Fernández as Enfermera
- Gerardo del Castillo as Mozo de Espiridion
- Armando Velasco as Agente de policía
- Humberto Rodríguez as Mesero
- Honorato Bassoco as Policía
- Crox Alvarado as Empleado hotel
- Víctor Junco as Guardaespalda de Espiridion
- Salvador Quiroz as Gerente hotel

== Bibliography ==
- Amador, María Luisa. Cartelera cinematográfica, 1930-1939. Filmoteca, UNAM, 1980.
- Avila, Jacqueline. Cinesonidos: Film Music and National Identity During Mexico's Época de Oro. Oxford University Press, 2019.
- Richard, Alfred. Censorship and Hollywood's Hispanic image: an interpretive filmography, 1936-1955. Greenwood Press, 1993.
