= Armando Velasco =

Ecuadorian-born Mexican actor

- Born: 18 January 1918; Quito, Ecuador
- Died: 29 September 1999 (aged 81); Mexico City, Mexico
- Occupation: Actor

Armando Velasco (18 January 1918 – 29 September 1999) was an Ecuadorian-born Mexican actor who worked on the Golden Age of Mexican cinema, on films such as The Saint Who Forged a Country (1942), Historia de un gran amor (1942), and You Had To Be a Gypsy (1953).

== Selected filmography ==
- While Mexico Sleeps (1938)
- Horse for Horse (1939)
- In the Times of Don Porfirio (1940)
- Miente y serás feliz (1940)
- Borrasca humana (1940)
- Neither Blood nor Sand (1941)
- El rápido de las 9.15 (1941)
- Oh, What Times, Don Simon! (1941)
- The Unknown Policeman (1941)
- Historia de un gran amor (1942)
- The Saint Who Forged a Country (1942)
- Gran Hotel (1944)
- Twilight (1945)
- Tender Pumpkins (1949)
- The Lady of the Veil (1949)
- Midnight (1949)
- The Magician (1949)
- Confessions of a Taxi Driver (1949)
- Love for Love (1950)
- La casa chica (1950)
- Between Your Love and Heaven (1950)
- When the Night Ends (1950)
- También de dolor se canta (1950)
- Immaculate (1950)
- Arrabalera (1951)
- Love for Sale (1951)
- Road of Hell (1951)
- Kill Me Because I'm Dying! (1951)
- The Three Happy Compadres (1952)
- Tropical Delirium (1952)
- If I Were a Congressman (1952)
- Private Secretary (1952)
- Snow White (1952)
- Here Comes Martin Corona (1952)
- El Enamorado (1952)
- Penjamo (1953)
- Neither Rich nor Poor (1953)
- Penjamo (1953)
- Forbidden Fruit (1953)
- Rossana (1953)
- A Divorce (1953)
- Pepe the Bull (1953)
- Eugenia Grandet (1953)
- Four Hours Before His Death (1953)
- The Criminal Life of Archibaldo de la Cruz (1955)
- The Sin of Being a Woman (1955)
- Corazón salvaje (1956)
- My Mother Is Guilty (1960)

== Bibliography ==
- Trelles Plazaola, Luis. Imágenes cambiantes: descubrimiento, conquista y colonización de la América hispana vista por el cine de ficción y largometraje. La Editorial, UPR, 1996.
- Ibarra, Jesús. Los Bracho: tres generaciones de cine mexicano. UNAM, 2006.
- Gallardo Saborido, Emilio José. Gitana tenías que ser: las Andalucías imaginadas por las coproducciones fílmicas España-latinoamérica. Centro de Estudios Andaluces, 2010.
