= The Price of Living =

1954 film

- Directed by: Tito Davison
- Written by: Julio Alejandro; Tito Davison
- Produced by: Sergio Kogan
- Starring: Arturo de Córdova; Rosita Quintana; María Douglas
- Cinematography: Víctor Herrera
- Edited by: José W. Bustos
- Music by: Raúl Lavista
- Production company: Internacional Cinematográfica
- Distributed by: Columbia Pictures (US)
- Release date: 3 February 1954
- Running time: 105 minutes
- Country: Mexico
- Language: Spanish

The Price of Living (Spanish: El valor de vivir) is a 1954 Mexican drama film directed by Tito Davison and starring Arturo de Córdova, Rosita Quintana and María Douglas. It was the first Mexican film to be shot in 3D.

The film's sets were designed by the art director Gunther Gerszo.

== Cast ==
- Arturo de Córdova
- Rosita Quintana
- María Douglas
- Julio Villarreal
- Miguel Ángel Ferriz
- José Baviera
- José María Linares-Rivas
- Delia Magaña
- Otilia Larrañaga
- Gilberto González
- Nicolás Rodríguez
- Eva Beltri
- Fernando Wagner
- Miguel Manzano
- José Silva
- Ricardo Silva
- Queta Lavat
- Agustín Fernández
- Antonio Bravo
- Guillermo Álvarez Bianchi
- José Pardavé
- Enrique García Álvarez
- Mercedes Pascual

== Bibliography ==
- Baugh, Scott L. Latino American Cinema: An Encyclopedia of Movies, Stars, Concepts, and Trends. ABC-CLIO, 2012.
