= Every Child a Cross to Bear =

1957 film

- Directed by: Juan Bustillo Oro
- Written by: Juan Bustillo Oro; Humberto Gómez Landero
- Produced by: Rafael Pérez Grovas
- Starring: Esther Fernández; Demetrio González; Maricruz Olivier
- Cinematography: Raúl Martínez Solares
- Edited by: Gloria Schoemann
- Music by: Manuel Esperón
- Production company: Tele Talia Films
- Release date: 19 May 1957
- Running time: 105 minutes
- Country: Mexico
- Language: Spanish

Every Child a Cross to Bear (Spanish: Cada hijo una cruz) is a 1957 Mexican drama film co-written and directed by Juan Bustillo Oro and starring Esther Fernández, Demetrio González and Maricruz Olivier. The film's sets were designed by the art director Javier Torres Torija.

== Cast ==
- Esther Fernández as Lupita
- Demetrio González as Raymundo
- Miguel Manzano as Don José
- Joaquín García Vargas as Casimiro
- Maricruz Olivier as Amalia
- José Gálvez as Pepe
- Miguel Córcega as Federico
- Elvira Quintana
- Óscar Ortiz de Pinedo
- Luis Aragón
- Fernando Mendoza
- Jorge Mateos
- Miguel Ángel López
- Humberto Rodríguez

== Bibliography ==
- Riera, Emilio García . Historia documental del cine mexicano: 1957-1958. Universidad de Guadalajara, 1992.
- Stock, Anne Marie (ed.) Framing Latin American Cinema: Contemporary Critical Perspectives. University of Minnesota Press, 1997.
