= Music Inside =

1947 film

- Directed by: Humberto Gómez Landero
- Written by: Humberto Gómez Landero; Octavio Novaro
- Produced by: Jesús Grovas
- Starring: Germán Valdés; Marga López
- Cinematography: Víctor Herrera
- Edited by: José W. Bustos
- Music by: Armando Rosales
- Production companies: AS Films; Producciónes Grovas
- Release date: 20 February 1947
- Country: Mexico
- Language: Spanish

Music Inside (Spanish: Con la música por dentro) is a 1947 Mexican musical comedy film directed by Humberto Gómez Landero and starring Germán Valdés "Tin-Tan" and Marga López.

== Cast ==
- Germán Valdés as Tin Tán / Hortensia
- Marcelo Chávez as Don Nardo del Valle
- Marga López as Rosita del Valle
- Isabelita Blanch as Margarita
- Carlos Martínez Baena as Molinette
- Eduardo Vivas as Conde Francisco José Federico Maximiliano
- Maruja Grifell as Condesa
- Rafael Icardo as Jacinto
- Manuel Roche as Narciso

== Bibliography ==
- Carlos Monsiváis & John Kraniauskas. Mexican Postcards. Verso, 1997.
