= Miguel Inclán =

Mexican actor (1897–1956)

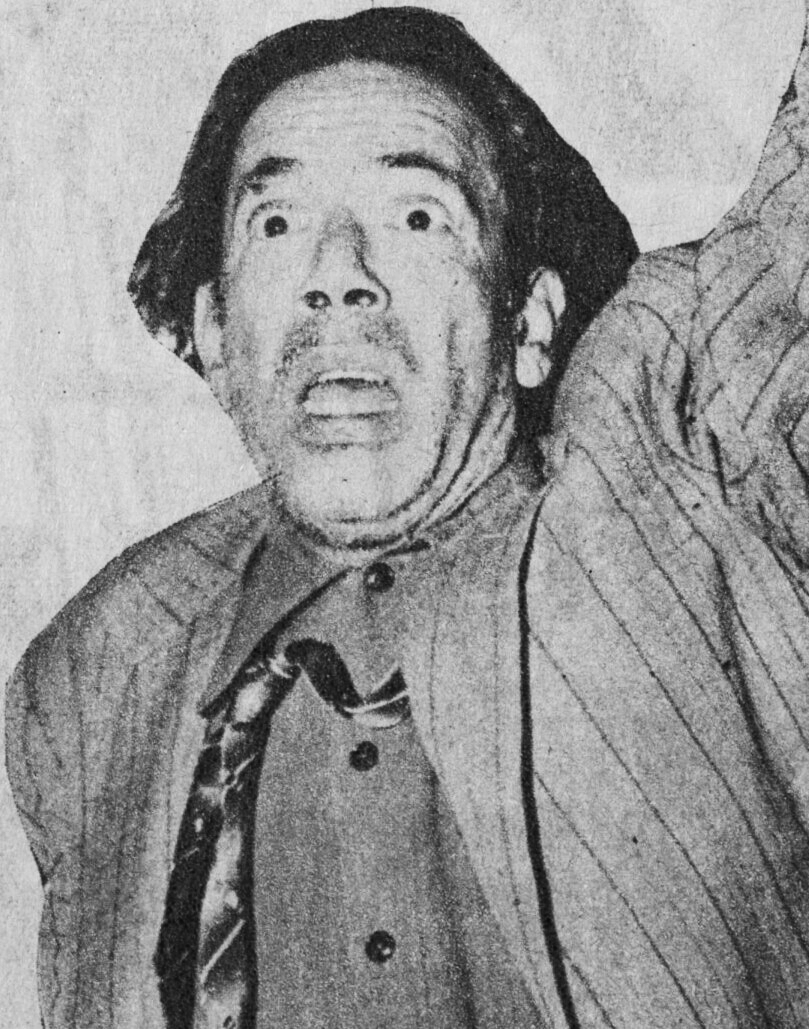
- Miguel Inclán in 1945
- Born: 12 December 1897; Mexico City, Mexico
- Died: July 25, 1956 (aged 58); Tijuana, Mexico
- Other name: Miguel Inclán Delgado
- Occupation: Actor
- Years active: 1938-1956 (film)

Miguel Inclán (1897–1956) was a Mexican film actor. He became known for his villainous roles during the Golden Age of Mexican cinema. In American filmmaking he played a hostage in John Ford's The Fugitive (1947), and Apache Indian chief Cochise in John Ford's Fort Apache (1948).

Inclán's sister was the actress Lupe Inclán.

== Selected filmography ==
- Nobleza ranchera (1938) - Pánfilo
- The Cemetery of the Eagles (1939) - Gral. Pedro Ma. Anaya
- United But Not Mixed (1939) - Sisebuto Corrales
- Heart of a Child (1939) - Señor Precusa
- Los olvidados de Dios (1940) - Macario Hernández García 'El Gorrión'
- The Hawk (1940) - Gaspar
- Los de abajo (1940) - El meco
- El charro Negro (1940) - Pancho, esbirro de Emilio
- Mala yerba (1940) - Manuel
- El monje loco (1940)
- El Zorro de Jalisco (1941) - 'Sonaja'
- Creo en Dios (1941)
- Neither Blood Nor Sand (1941) - Jefe de Policía
- Cuando los hijos se van (1941) - Patricio Gómez
- The 9.15 Express (1941) - El Anticuario
- Amor chinaco (1941)
- ¡Ay Jalisco... no te rajes! (1941) - Chueco Gallegos
- El barbero prodigioso (1942) - El ciego
- Allá en el bajio (1942) - Chino
- Los dos pilletes (1942)
- La epopeya del camino (1942) - Tata
- Simón Bolívar (1942) - Sargento Pérez
- La isla de la pasión (1942) - Sargento
- The Three Musketeers (1942)
- I'm a Real Mexican (1942) - Pedro
- La vírgen roja (1943)
- La posada sangrienta (1943) - Lázaro Gómez, mayordomo
- Father Morelos (1943)
- Doña Bárbara (1943) - Melquiades
- Lightning in the South (1943) - Macario García
- Mexicanos, al grito de guerra (1943) - President Benito Juárez
- María Candelaria (1944) - Don Damian
- China poblana (1944) - El Pitarras
- Murallas de pasión (1944)
- The Escape (1944) - Miguel
- Porfirio Díaz (1944)
- El mexicano (1944)
- Rosa de las nieves (1944)
- Adiós, Mariquita linda (1944)
- El criollo (1945) - Coronel
- The Hour of Truth (1945)
- Caminos de sangre (1945) - Ángel Santos
- La selva de fuego (1945) - Rufino
- Volver a vivir (1946)
- Guadalajara pues (1946) - Don Filiberto Correa
- Enamorada (1946) - Capt. Bocanegra
- The Tiger of Jalisco (1947) - Tigre de Pedrero
- If I'm to Be Killed Tomorrow (1947) - Sebastián Rojas
- The Fugitive (1947) - A Hostage
- Nosotros los Pobres (1948) - Don Pilar
- Fort Apache (1948) - Cochise
- Barrio de pasiones (1948)
- Maclovia (1948) - Tata Macario
- Salón México (1949) - Lupe López
- Love in Every Port (1949)
- Rayito de luna (1949) - Trujillo
- Tierra muerta (1949)
- El rencor de la tierra (1949)
- Cuando los hijos odian (1950) - Ramón González
- Aventurera (1950) - Rengo
- Los Olvidados (1950) - Don Carmelo, el ciego
- Los hijos de la calle (1951) - Nieves
- La tienda de la esquina (1951) - Don Ramón Suárez
- El Siete Machos (1950) - Toño
- Los pobres siempre van al cielo (1951) - Padre Bernardo
- My General's Women (1951) - Blas
- Indian Uprising (1952) - Geronimo
- Looks that Kill (1954) - Paco
- Reto a la vida (1954)
- El águila negra (1954) - Ciriaco
- The White Rose (1954) - Manuel Altamirano
- Untouched (1954) - Máximo
- María la Voz (1955) - Bernabe, abuelo de Andres
- El plagiario (1955)
- Seven Cities of Gold (1955) - Schrichak (uncredited)
- Fuerza de los humildes (1955)
- Bandido (1956) - Priest (final film role)

== Bibliography ==
- Rogelio Agrasánchez. Guillermo Calles: A Biography of the Actor and Mexican Cinema Pioneer. McFarland, 2010.
