= José W. Bustos =

Mexican film editor

- Occupation: Editor
- Years active: 1940–1979 (film)

José W. Bustos was a Mexican film editor who began his career during the Golden Age of Mexican cinema. His brother Jorge Bustos was also an editor.

== Selected filmography ==
- Narciso's Hard Luck (1940)
- I'm a Real Mexican (1942)
- María Eugenia (1943)
- The Rebel (1943)
- A Woman's Diary (1944)
- Summer Hotel (1944)
- The Disobedient Son (1945)
- It's Not Enough to Be a Charro (1946)
- The Noiseless Dead (1946)
- Music Inside (1947)
- The Lost Child (1947)
- The Tiger of Jalisco (1947)
- Music, Poetry and Madness (1948)
- Two of the Angry Life (1948)
- Hypocrite (1949)
- Only Veracruz Is Beautiful (1949)
- Rough But Respectable (1949)
- The Woman of the Port (1949)
- The Mark of the Fox (1950)
- Among Lawyers I See You (1951)
- The Chicken Hawk (1951)
- Serenade in Acapulco (1951)
- Oh Darling! Look What You've Done! (1951)
- Tenement House (1951)
- Crime and Punishment (1951)
- Here Comes Martin Corona (1952)
- Tropical Delirium (1952)
- Paco the Elegant (1952)
- The Price of Living (1954)
- The Sin of Being a Woman (1955)
- Look What Happened to Samson (1955)
- Barefoot Sultan (1956)
- Rebel Without a House (1960)
- His First Love (1960)
- Satánico pandemonium (1975)
- The Divine Caste (1977)

== Bibliography ==
- Emilio José Gallardo Saborido. Gitana tenías que ser: las Andalucías imaginadas por las coproducciones fílmicas España-Latinoamérica. Centro de Estudios Andaluces, 2010.
