= Satánico pandemonium =

- Directed by: Gilberto Martínez Solares
- Written by: Jorge Barragán; Adolfo Martínez Solares; Gilberto Martínez Solares
- Produced by: Jorge Barragán
- Starring: Delia Magaña; Enrique Rocha; Cecilia Pezet
- Cinematography: Jorge Stahl Jr.
- Edited by: José W. Bustos
- Music by: Gustavo César Carrión
- Production companies: Compañía Cinematográfica de Baja California; Hollywood Films; Promoción Turística Mexicana
- Distributed by: Wea-des Moines Video
- Release date: 26 June 1975 (Mexico)
- Running time: 87 minutes
- Country: Mexico
- Language: Spanish

Satánico pandemonium (English: Satanic Pandemonium) is a 1975 Mexican nunsploitation horror film directed by Gilberto Martínez Solares and written by Jorge Barragán, Adolfo Martínez Solares and Gilberto Martínez Solares. It stars Cecilia Pezet, Enrique Rocha and Delia Magaña.

== Plot ==
Sister Maria lives with the convent for her charity works, but in the secret depths of her fantasies, she becomes agonized by visions from another world, a world in which she is permitted to run free. In this world Satan is her lord, and her acts of violence and blasphemy mount. Sister Maria realizes that she is elected by the Devil himself to destroy the convent and lead her sister nuns into hell. Only the Devil can intuit the dark secrets of her tortured mind.

== Cast ==
- Enrique Rocha as Luzbel / Lucifer
- Cecilia Pezet as Sister Maria
- Delia Magaña
- Clemencia Colin
- Sandra Torres
- Adarene San Martin
- Patricia Alban
- Yayoi Tokawa
- Amparo Fustenberg
- Paula Aack
- Laura Montalvo
- Verónica Ávila
- Leo Villanueva
- Daniel Albertos
- Verónica Rivas
- Valeria Lupercio

== Production ==
Shooting began in the spring of 1974 in the convents at Tepoztlán, Morelos and Morelia, Michoacán in Mexico. It was inspired by Ken Russell’s The Devils. The film inspired Salma Hayek's character Santanico Pandemonium in From Dusk Till Dawn.

== Release ==
It premiered on 26 June 1975 as La sexorcista in the cinemas in Mexico and was released on 24 October 1987 as Satanic Pandemonium: The Sexorcist by Eagle Video on VHS. The DVD was released on 31 May 2005 by Mondo Macabro in the United States.

== Soundtrack ==
The score was composed by Gustavo César Carrión.

== Genre ==
The film is a amalgam of witch hunter horror and nunsploitation.

== See also ==
- Alucarda: a 1977 Mexican horror film also dealing with similar theme
