= Tenement House (film) =

1951 film

- Directed by: Juan Bustillo Oro
- Written by: Fernando del Corral; Fernando de Fuentes; Juan Bustillo Oro
- Produced by: Juan Bustillo Oro; Fernando del Corral; Gonzalo Elvira
- Starring: David Silva; Meche Barba; Andrés Soler
- Cinematography: Jorge Stahl Jr.
- Edited by: José W. Bustos
- Music by: Raúl Lavista
- Production company: Oro Films
- Release date: 8 February 1951
- Running time: 113 minutes
- Country: Mexico
- Language: Spanish

Tenement House (Spanish: Casa de vecindad) is a 1951 Mexican drama film directed by Juan Bustillo Oro and starring David Silva, Meche Barba and Andrés Soler. It was shot at the Tepeyac Studios in Mexico City. The film's sets were designed by the art director Javier Torres Torija.

== Cast ==
- David Silva as Ramón Domínguez
- Meche Barba as Carmela
- Andrés Soler as Don Clemente
- Irma Torres as Esther
- Luis Beristáin as Dr. Guevara
- Lupe Inclán as Doña Petra
- Queta Lavat as Rosita
- Matilde Palou as Loreto
- Eugenia Galindo as Blandinita
- Miguel Manzano as Don Panchito
- Prudencia Grifell as Doña Leonor
- Fernando Casanova as Manolo
- Arturo Martínez as Rafael
- Tony Díaz as Felipe
- Nicolás Rodríguez hijo as Roberto
- Velquiz Mora as Chepinita
- Elisa Christy as Antonieta
- Ivonne Adoree as Lupita
- Kika Meyer as Mujer del sultán
- Pepe Nava as Hijo de Petra
- Carmen Guillén as Amiga de Antonieta
- Humberto Rodríguez as Actuario
- Francisco Reiguera as Abogado
- Lupe del Castillo as Doña Francisca
- María Luisa Smith as Mamá de Esther
- Joaquín Roche hijo as Niño gruñón
- Miguel Funes hijo as Niño de vecindad
- Julio Daneri as Detective policía

== Bibliography ==
- Amador, María Luisa. Cartelera cinematográfica, 1950-1959. UNAM, 1985.
- Reyes, Alvaro A. Fernández . Crimen y suspenso en el cine mexicano 1946-1955. El Colegio de Michoacán, 2007.
