= ¿Quién te quiere a ti? =

- Directed by: Rolando Aguilar
- Starring: Sara García
- Release date: 1942
- Country: Mexico
- Language: Spanish

¿Quién te quiere a ti? ("Who Loves You?") is a 1942 Mexican film. It stars Sara García.
