= These Men (film) =

- Directed by: Rolando Aguilar
- Starring: Adriana Lamar; Arturo de Córdova; Marina Tamayo
- Production company: Productora Continental
- Release date: 22 April 1937
- Running time: 80 minutes
- Country: Mexico
- Language: Spanish

These Men (Spanish: ¡Esos hombres!) is a 1937 Mexican comedy drama film directed by Rolando Aguilar and starring Adriana Lamar, Arturo de Córdova and Marina Tamayo.

== Cast ==
- Adriana Lamar as Azucena
- Arturo de Córdova as Fernando de la Peña
- Marina Tamayo as Juana
- Luis G. Barreiro as Don Panchito
- Emma Roldán as Doña María
- Manuel Noriega as José
- María Fernanda Ibáñez as Lilí
- Maria Berlini as María
- José Eduardo Pérez as Ramón
- Alejandro Galindo as Vecino
- Maria del Pilar Alvarez as Domitila
- Elvira Ríos as Cantante

== Bibliography ==
- Andrew Grant Wood. Agustin Lara: A Cultural Biography. OUP USA, 2014.
