= Víctor Herrera (cinematographer) =

Mexican cinematographer

- Born: 28 July 1904; Mexico City, Mexico
- Died: 3 August 1961 (aged 57); Mexico City, Mexico
- Occupation: Cinematographer
- Years active: 1935–1961 (film)

Víctor Herrera (1904–1961) was a Mexican cinematographer. He worked on numerous film productions during the Golden Age of Mexican Cinema.

== Selected filmography ==
- Heads or Tails (1937)
- Such Is My Country (1937)
- Three Peasants on a Donkey (1939)
- María Eugenia (1943)
- Divorced (1943)
- The Rock of Souls (1943)
- La Mujer sin Alma (1944)
- Adultery (1945)
- The Disobedient Son (1945)
- The Shack (1945)
- It's Not Enough to Be a Charro (1946)
- Symphony of Life (1946)
- The Noiseless Dead (1946)
- The Lost Child (1947)
- Music Inside (1947)
- If I'm to Be Killed Tomorrow (1947)
- The Tiger of Jalisco (1947)
- Juan Charrasqueado (1948)
- Spurs of Gold (1948)
- Two Pesos Left (1949)
- Love in Every Port (1949)
- Don't Love Me So Much (1949)
- Hypocrite (1949)
- Jalisco Sings in Seville (1949)
- Sinbad the Seasick (1950)
- We Maids (1951)
- Good Night, My Love (1951)
- La trinca del aire (1951)
- From the Can-Can to the Mambo (1951)
- The Border Man (1952)
- The Great Deceiver (1953)
- Penjamo (1953)
- Sitting Bull (1954)
- The Three Elenas (1954)
- A Tailored Gentleman (1954)
- The Price of Living (1954)
- Drop the Curtain (1955)
- To the Four Winds (1955)
- The King of Mexico (1956)
- The Body Snatcher (1957)
- El castillo de los monstruos (1958)
- El buena suerte (1961)

== Bibliography ==
- Poppe, Nicolas. Alton's Paradox: Foreign Film Workers and the Emergence of Industrial Cinema in Latin America. State University of New York Press, 2021.
- Raimondo-Souto, H. Mario. Motion Picture Photography: A History, 1891-1960. McFarland, 2006.
- Senn, Bryan. "Twice the Thrills! Twice the Chills!": Horror and Science Fiction Double Features, 1955-1974. McFarland, 2019.
