= El casto Susano =

1954 film by Joaquín Pardavé

- Directed by: Joaquín Pardavé
- Screenplay by: Ramón Obón; Joaquín Pardavé
- Story by: Gregorio Walerstein (as Mauricio Wall)
- Produced by: Gregorio Walerstein
- Starring: Joaquín Pardavé; Silvia Pinal; Fernando Fernández; Antonio Aguilar; Perla Aguiar; Fanny Schiller; Agustín Isunza; Gloria Mange
- Cinematography: Agustín Martínez Solares
- Edited by: Rafael Ceballos
- Music by: Sergio Guerrero
- Distributed by: Filmex
- Release date: May 20, 1954 (Mexico)
- Running time: 90 minutes
- Country: Mexico
- Language: Spanish

El casto Susano ("The Chaste Susano") is a 1954 Mexican comedy film directed by Joaquín Pardavé and starring Pardavé, Silvia Pinal and Fernando Fernández.

== Plot ==
Susano is a country man who lives in a puritanical marriage with Virtudes, with whom he has a daughter, Marta. Annoyed that Manuel, Marta's suitor, appears to be an inexperienced and naive young man, he takes him on a trip to the capital. The trip actually turns out to be an excuse for Susano to visit the vedette Mimi, whom he has been courting by presenting himself as a bachelor, much to the annoyance of another of Mimi's suitors, Federico. During their stay, Susano discovers that Manuel is actually known in the capital as a bohemian singer and songwriter, who only pretended to be naive to Marta in an attempt to break off the relationship, as it was Manuel's father who arranged Manuel's engagement with Marta against Manuel's wishes. Complicating things even more, Susano discovers that his wife Virtudes and Marta also traveled to the capital, having been alerted by Federico.

== Cast ==
- Joaquín Pardavé as Susano
- Silvia Pinal as Mimí
- Fernando Fernández as Manuel
- Antonio Aguilar as Federico (as Tony Aguilar)
- Perla Aguiar as Dulce Cachemira.
- Fanny Schiller as Doña Virtudes
- Agustín Isunza as Hildebrando.
- Gloria Mange as Marta
- María Herrero as Berta
- Maruja Grifell as French dressmaker
- María Luisa Cortés as Model
- Alfonso Arau (uncredited)
- Lupe Carriles (uncredited)
- Sergio Corona (uncredited)
- Maty Huitrón as Model (uncredited).

== Production ==
Pardavé's character, Susano Alegre y Rematado, has been considered a sort of parody of the character that had established him as an actor in My Memories of Mexico (1944), Susano "Susanito" Peñafiel y Somellera. Pardavé and Antonio Aguilar had previously worked together on My Darling Clementine (1953).

== Release ==
The film premiered at the Cine Opera on 20 May 1954.
