= The Rock of Souls =

1943 film

- Directed by: Miguel Zacarías
- Written by: Miguel Zacarías
- Produced by: Jesus Grovas
- Starring: Jorge Negrete; María Félix; Carlos López Moctezuma; Miguel Angel Ferriz; Virginia Manzano
- Cinematography: Víctor Herrera
- Edited by: Jose W. Bustos
- Music by: Ernesto Cortázar; Manuel Esperón
- Production company: Producciones Grovas
- Distributed by: Clasa Films Mundiales
- Release date: 25 February 1943
- Running time: 121 minutes
- Country: Mexico
- Language: Spanish

The Rock of Souls (Spanish: El Peñón de las Ánimas) is a 1943 Mexican drama film directed by Miguel Zacarías and starring Jorge Negrete, María Félix and René Cardona. It is the first movie to star María Félix, one of the legendary female stars of the Golden Age of Mexican cinema.

== Plot ==
In a little town in Mexico, the rivalry between the families of Fernando Iturriaga (Jorge Negrete) and María Ángela Valdivia (María Félix) for the domain of a property known as El Peñón de las Ánimas prevents the love between the two young lovers.

== Cast ==
- Jorge Negrete as Fernando Iturriaga
- María Félix as María Ángela Valdivia
- René Cardona as Manuel
- Miguel Ángel Ferriz as Don Braulio
- Carlos López Moctezuma as Felipe, María Ángela's brother
- Virginia Manzano as Rosa
- Conchita Gentil Arcos as Madame
- Manuel Dondé as Macario
- Roberto Cañedo
- Julio Ahuet
- Hernán Vera
- Paco Astol
- Paco Martínez
- Armando Sáenz
- Linda Christian
- Cecilia Leger as Modista
- Manuel Pozos as Señor gobernador
- Humberto Rodríguez as Invitado al baile

== Production ==
For the movie, Jorge Negrete requested that his then-girlfriend, actress Gloria Marín, be his costar; however, Félix was selected by the director, which led to a series of altercations between the couple. Ten years later they got married.

== Bibliography ==
- Baugh, Scott L. Latino American Cinema: An Encyclopedia of Movies, Stars, Concepts, and Trends. ABC-CLIO, 2012.
