= El verdugo de Sevilla =

- Directed by: Fernando Soler
- Written by: Enrique García Álvarez; Paulino Masip
- Based on: El verdugo de Sevilla; 18th century play by Pedro Muñoz Seca
- Produced by: Diane Subervielle de Fontanals
- Starring: Sara García
- Cinematography: Gabriel Figueroa
- Edited by: Jorge Busto
- Music by: Raúl Lavista
- Release date: 1942
- Running time: 97 minutes
- Country: Mexico
- Language: Spanish

El verdugo de Sevilla ("The Executioner of Seville") is a 1942 Mexican film. It stars Sara García and Fernando Soler. It is based on a play by Pedro Muñoz Seca. It was made as part of a series of Mexican films set in Spain in the 1940s, such as Dos mexicanos en Sevilla (1942). Its title is a reference to The Barber of Seville, an 18th-century French play by Pierre Beaumarchais.

== Cast ==
- Fernando Soler as Don Bonifacio Bonilla
- Sara García as Doña Nieves
- Domingo Soler as Sansoni
- Julio Villarreal as Talmilla
- Miguel Arenas as Sinapismo
- Ricardo Montalbán as Jacobito
- Florencio Castelló
