= Music, Poetry and Madness =

1948 film

Musicia, Poet and Madman
- Directed by: Humberto Gómez Landero
- Written by: Antonio Guzmán Aguilera; Humberto Gómez Landero
- Produced by: Felipe Mier
- Starring: Germán Valdés; Meche Barba
- Cinematography: Ezequiel Carrasco
- Edited by: José W. Bustos
- Music by: Rosalío Ramirez; Federico Ruiz
- Production company: AS Films
- Release date: 8 May 1948
- Running time: 90 minutes
- Country: Mexico
- Language: Spanish

Music, Poetry and Madness (Spanish title: Músico, poeta y loco) is a 1948 Mexican comedy film written and directed by Humberto Gómez Landero, and starring Germán Valdés "Tin-Tan" and Meche Barba.

== Cast ==
- Germán Valdés as Tin Tan
- Marcelo Chávez as Marcelo
- Meche Barba as Mercedes Miraflores
- Beatriz Ramos as Consuelo Fernández
- Conchita Gentil Arcos as Doña Altagracia
- Maruja Grifell as Señorita directora
- Natalia Gentil Arcos as Secretaria
- Ernesto Finance as Don Maximiliano
- Rafael Icardo as Don Esteban
- Jesús Graña as Doctor Arsenio Mata Lozano
- Humberto Rodríguez as Jefe de policía
- Hernán Vera as Don Apolonio
- Luis Arcaraz
- Gloria Lozano as Chica baila con Tin Tan
- Félix Medel
- María Luisa Smith as Espectadora de vendedores
- Manuel 'Loco' Valdés as Transeunte

== Bibliography ==
- Joanne Hershfield & David R. Maciel. Mexico's Cinema: A Century of Film and Filmmakers. Rowman & Littlefield, 1999.
