= Roberto Cañedo =

Mexican actor (1918–1998)

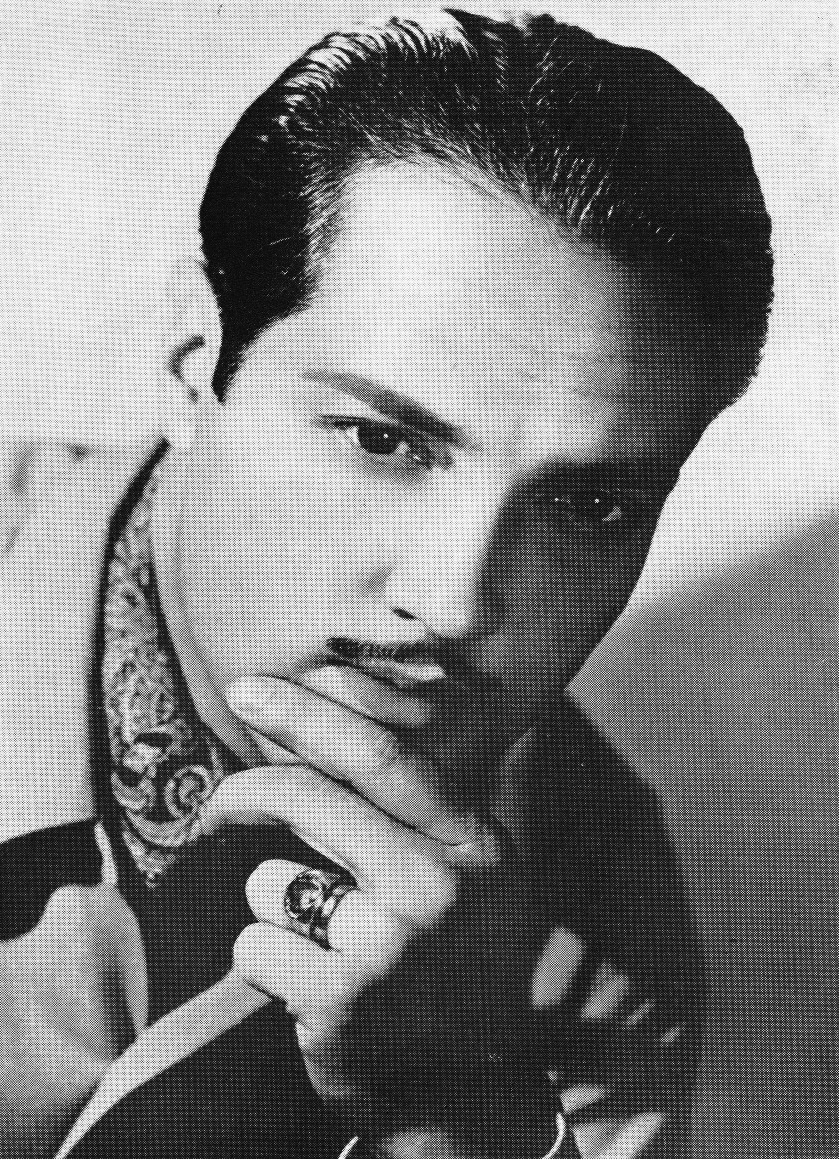
- Cañedo in 1954
- Born: Roberto Cañedo Ramírez; 30 January 1918; Guadalajara, Jalisco, Mexico
- Died: 16 June 1998 (aged 80); Mexico City, Mexico
- Occupation: Actor
- Years active: 1938–1993

Roberto Cañedo Ramírez (30 March 1918 – 16 June 1998), better known as Roberto Cañedo, was a Mexican actor of the Golden Age of Mexican cinema. During his career, he appeared in over 300 films.

Cañedo received two Ariel Award for Best Actor nominations for his performances in Pueblerina (1949) and Crime and Punishment (1951), he won for the former. In 1997, he was given a Golden Ariel for his life dedicated to the cinema.

== Selected filmography ==
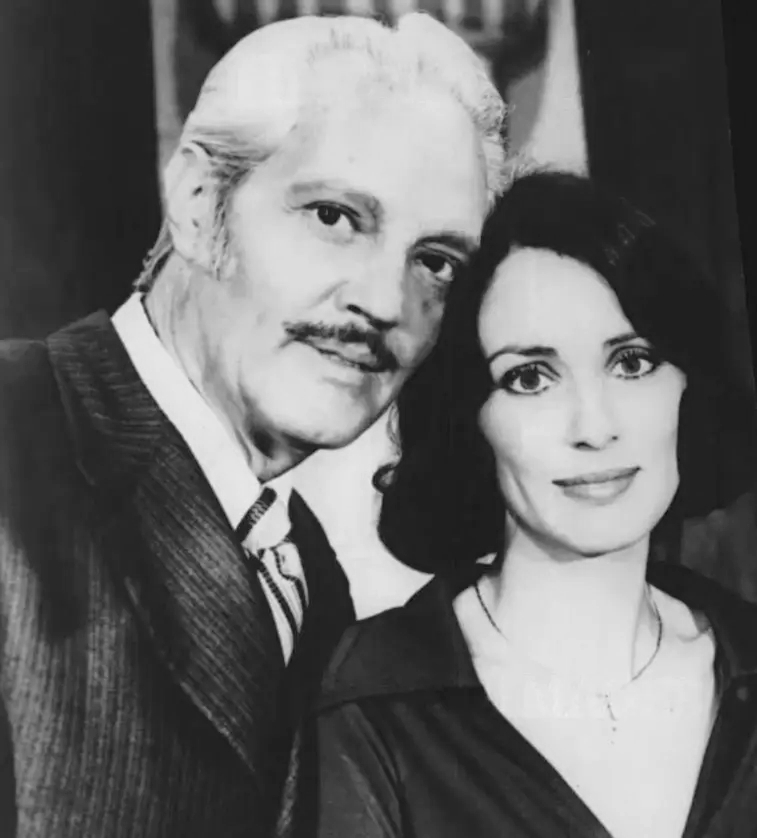
Roberto Cañedo with Helena Rojo in 1978

- The Coward (1939)
- In the Times of Don Porfirio (1940)
- The Unknown Policeman (1941)
- The League of Songs (1941)
- The Rock of Souls (1942)
- The Eternal Secret (1942)
- I Danced with Don Porfirio (1942)
- La razón de la culpa (1942)
- El Ametralladora (1943)
- María Eugenia (1943)
- The Rebel (1943)
- My Memories of Mexico (1944)
- The Lady of the Camellias (1944)
- Gran Hotel (1944)
- Saint Francis of Assisi (1944)
- The Headless Woman (1944)
- The Hour of Truth (1945)
- A Day with the Devil (1945)
- Adultery (1945)
- Murder in the Studios (1946)
- Love Makes Them Crazy (1946)
- Caribbean Rose (1946)
- Symphony of Life (1946)
- Fly Away, Young Man! (1947)
- Arsène Lupin (1947)
- Gangster's Kingdom (1948)
- Beau Ideal (1948)
- The Unloved Woman (1949)
- Salón México (1949)
- Between Your Love and Heaven (1950)
- Un día de vida (1950)
- The Little House (1950)
- Crime and Punishment (1951)
- I Don't Deny My Past (1952)
- Los dineros del diablo (1953)
- Hotel Room (1953)
- Reportaje (1953)
- The White Rose (1954)
- Lola the Truck Driver (1983)
- La Coyota (1987)
- Grave Robbers (1989)
