= Dos pesos dejada =

1949 film

- Directed by: Joaquín Pardavé
- Written by: José Fernández del Villar (play); Joaquín Pardavé
- Produced by: Jesús Grovas
- Starring: Joaquín Pardavé; Sara García; Abel Salazar
- Cinematography: Víctor Herrera
- Edited by: Mario González
- Music by: Manuel Esperón
- Production company: Cinematográfica Grovas
- Release date: 7 September 1949
- Running time: 100 minutes
- Country: Mexico
- Language: Spanish

Dos pesos dejada (lit. Two Pesos a Ride) is a 1949 comedy drama film directed by Joaquín Pardavé and starring Pardavé, Sara García and Abel Salazar. It was shot at the Tepeyac Studios in Mexico City. The film's sets were designed by the art director Carlos Toussaint.

== Cast ==
- Joaquín Pardavé as Gabino Pringoso
- Sara García as Doña Prudencia
- Abel Salazar as Fermín
- Alicia Caro as Lupe
- Esmeralda as Risaralda
- Alfredo Varela as Coquito
- Conchita Gentil Arcos as Doña Refugio
- Pepe Martínez as Sacerdote
- Flora Alicia Campos as Lidia
- Rosario García as Doña Juana
- Salvador Quiroz as Custodio

== Bibliography ==
- Riera, Emilio García. Historia documental del cine mexicano: época sonora, Volume 4. Ediciones Era, 1969.
