= Jesús Grovas =

Mexican film producer

- Born: 4 April 1899; Mexico
- Died: 10 September 1967 (aged 68); Mexico City, Mexico
- Occupation: Film producer
- Years active: 1937–1967 (film)

Jesús Grovas (1899–1967) was a Mexican film producer active for several decades in the Mexican film industry. His career took off during the Golden Age of Mexican Cinema. He formed a production company with the director Juan Bustillo Oro which produced a number of commercial successes.

== Selected filmography ==
- Poppy of the Road (1937)
- The Girl's Aunt (1938)
- Every Madman to His Specialty (1939)
- Horse for Horse (1939)
- In the Times of Don Porfirio (1939)
- You're Missing the Point (1940)
- To the Sound of the Marimba (1941)
- ¡Así se quiere en Jalisco! (1941)
- I Danced with Don Porfirio (1942)
- Simón Bolívar (1942)
- The Eternal Secret (1942)
- Doña Bárbara (1943)
- The Noiseless Dead (1946)
- It's Not Enough to Be a Charro (1946)
- The Devourer (1946)
- If I'm to Be Killed Tomorrow (1947)
- Soledad (1947)
- The Lost Child (1947)
- Music Inside (1947)
- The Last Night (1948)
- Two of the Angry Life (1948)
- Dos pesos dejada (1949)
- Only Veracruz Is Beautiful (1949)
- Immaculate (1950)
- History of a Heart (1951)
- Get Your Sandwiches Here (1951)
- The Trace of Some Lips (1952)
- Here Come the Freeloaders (1953)
- Penjamo (1953)
- The Boy and the Fog (1953)
- Father Against Son (1955)
- The Medallion Crime (1956)
- Arm in Arm Down the Street (1956)
- Las señoritas Vivanco (1959)
- El proceso de las señoritas Vivanco (1961)

== Bibliography ==
- Brill, Olaf (ed.) Expressionism in the Cinema. Edinburgh University Press, 2016.
- Pilcher, Jeffrey M. Cantinflas and the Chaos of Mexican Modernity. Rowman & Littlefield, 2001.
