= Agustín Isunza =

Mexican actor

- Born: Agustín Isunza y del Palacio; 3 September 1900; Muzquiz, Coahuila, Mexico
- Died: 23 August 1978 (aged 77); Mexico City, Mexico
- Occupation: Actor
- Years active: 1938-1977 (film)

Agustín Isunza (1900–1978) was a Mexican film actor. He appeared in over two hundred films during his career.

== Selected filmography ==
- Café Concordia (1939)
- Horse for Horse (1939)
- In the Times of Don Porfirio (1940)
- You're Missing the Point (1940)
- Oh, What Times, Don Simon! (1941)
- The Unknown Policeman (1941)
- Five Minutes of Love (1941)
- Jesusita in Chihuahua (1942)
- The Count of Monte Cristo (1942)
- Doña Bárbara (1943)
- Wild Flower (1943)
- I Am a Fugitive (1946)
- Rosalinda (1945)
- Symphony of Life (1946)
- Two of the Angry Life (1948)
- Las tandas del principal (1949)
- Only Veracruz Is Beautiful (1949)
- Mi querido capitán (1950)
- Black Angustias (1950)
- I Don't Deny My Past (1952)
- The Border Man (1952)
- The Minister's Daughter (1952)
- Penjamo (1953)
- Dona Mariquita of My Heart (1953)
- Your Memory and Me (1953)
- El casto Susano (1954)
- Father Against Son (1955)
- Illusion Travels by Streetcar (1956)
- Here Are the Aguilares! (1957)
- So Loved Our Fathers (1964)
- La Valentina (1966)
- Un Quijote sin mancha (1969)
- El Topo (1970)

== Bibliography ==
- Rogelio Agrasánchez. Guillermo Calles: A Biography of the Actor and Mexican Cinema Pioneer. McFarland, 2010.
