= I Danced with Don Porfirio =

1942 film

- Directed by: Gilberto Martínez Solares
- Written by: Gilberto Martínez Solares; Eduardo Ugarte; Enrique Uthoff
- Produced by: Jesús Grovas; Mauricio de la Serna
- Starring: Mapy Cortés; Joaquín Pardavé; Emilio Tuero
- Cinematography: Raúl Martínez Solares
- Edited by: Jorge Bustos; Gloria Schoemann
- Music by: Manuel Esperón
- Production company: Producciónes Grovas
- Distributed by: Clasa Films Mundiales
- Release date: 29 October 1942
- Running time: 102 minutes
- Country: Mexico
- Language: Spanish

I Danced with Don Porfirio (Spanish: Yo bailé con don Porfirio) is a 1942 Mexican period musical comedy film directed by Gilberto Martínez Solares and starring Mapy Cortés, Joaquín Pardavé and Emilio Tuero. It was shot at the Clasa Studios in Mexico City. The film's sets were designed by the art director Manuel Fontanals.

== Synopsis ==
During the Presidency of Porfirio Díaz, provincial twin sisters Rosa and Violeta are constantly mistaken for each other. After moving to the city one of them appears on stage in revue theatre, but their identical appearance causes mass confusion.

== Cast ==
- Mapy Cortés as Rosa / Violeta
- Joaquín Pardavé as don Severo de los Rios / don Placido
- Emilio Tuero as Alberto Villanueva
- Fernando Cortés as Porfirio Barreda
- Julio Villarreal as Evaristo Mendizábal
- Consuelo Guerrero de Luna as doña Leonor
- Jorge Reyes as Rodolfo
- Consuelo Quiroz as Doña Chole
- Roberto Cañedo as Invitado al baile
- Leticia Palma as Invitada al baile
- Lupe del Castillo as Sirvienta

== Bibliography ==
- Avila, Jaqueline. Cinesonidos: Film Music and National Identity During Mexico's Época de Oro. Oxford University Press, 2019.
- Riera, Emilio García. Historia documental del cine mexicano: 1941. Ediciones Era, 1969.
