= The Adventurous Captain =

- Directed by: Arcady Boytler
- Written by: Manuel Penella, José Benavides hijo, Arcady Boytler
- Produced by: Pedro Maus, Felipe Mier, Salvador Novo
- Starring: Carlos Orellana, José Mojica, Manolita Saval
- Cinematography: Alex Phillips
- Edited by: Joseph Noriega
- Music by: Manuel Castro Padilla
- Production company: CISA
- Distributed by: Cinexport Distributing
- Release date: 1939
- Running time: 90 minutes
- Country: Mexico
- Language: Spanish

The Adventurous Captain (Spanish: El capitán aventurero) is a 1939 Mexican film directed by Arcady Boytler. It stars Carlos Orellana. It is 1 hour and 30 minutes long.
