= Manolita Saval =

Spanish actress and singer (1914–2001)

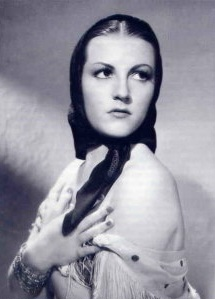
Saval in the 1940s

Juana María "Manolita" Saval Ballester (5 February 1914 in Paris – 23 August 2001 in Mexico City) was a Spanish actress and singer.

== Personal life ==
Juana María Saval was born in Paris of Spanish parents. She was the mother of the actor Manuel Saval, and the niece of the Spanish opera singer Vicente Ballester Aparício.

Saval died in Mexico City on August 23, 2001 of cardiac arrest due to thrombosis.

== Career ==
She studied music and drama in Spain, and began her career performing the opera Marina in Valencia. As a lyric interpreter, she toured Latin America, eventually settling in Mexico in 1938. Over the course of her career, she appeared in over 30 films and television programs, as well as in plays, operettas, and operas.

=== Recognition ===
In a review of her film debut in El capitán aventurero, The New York Times described her as "a new and charming Mexican actress."

== Filmography ==
=== Film ===
- El capitán aventurero (1939) as Carmina
- Papacito lindo (1939) as Paquita Moreno
- Poor Devil (1940)
- El que tenga un amor (1942)
- Virgen de medianoche (1942)
- Esa mujer es la mía (1942)
- El baisano Jalil (1942) as Marta
- María Eugenia (1943) as Raquel
- Ojos negros (1943)
- Les Misérables (1943) as Cosetta Ponchelevan
- Adiós juventud (1943)
- Amores de ayer (1944)
- El capitán Malacara (1945)
- La culpable (1946)
- Por un amor (1946)
- Fantasía ranchera (1947)
- Hijos de la mala vida (1949)
- Arrabalera (1951)
- Del suelo no paso (1959)
- Dos criados malcriados (1960)
- Esta noche no (1966) as Mama Sara
- Santa (1969)
- El ministro y yo (1976) as Estrellita
- La guerra de los pasteles (1979)

== Television ==
- Un amor en la sombra (1960)
- Divorciadas (1961)
- La duda (1967)
- La casa de las fieras (1967) as Mercedes
- El padre Guernica (1968)
- La hiena (1973)
- Mundo de juguete (1974)
- Querer volar (1980) as Paquita
- Vivir enamorada (1982) as Merceditas
- Madres egoístas (1 episode, 1991) as Rosario
- Muchachitas (1991) as Enriqueta
- El abuelo y yo (1992)
- Hasta que la muerte los separe (1 episode, 1994) as Manolita
