= Alfredo Varela Jr. =

Mexican screenwriter and actor

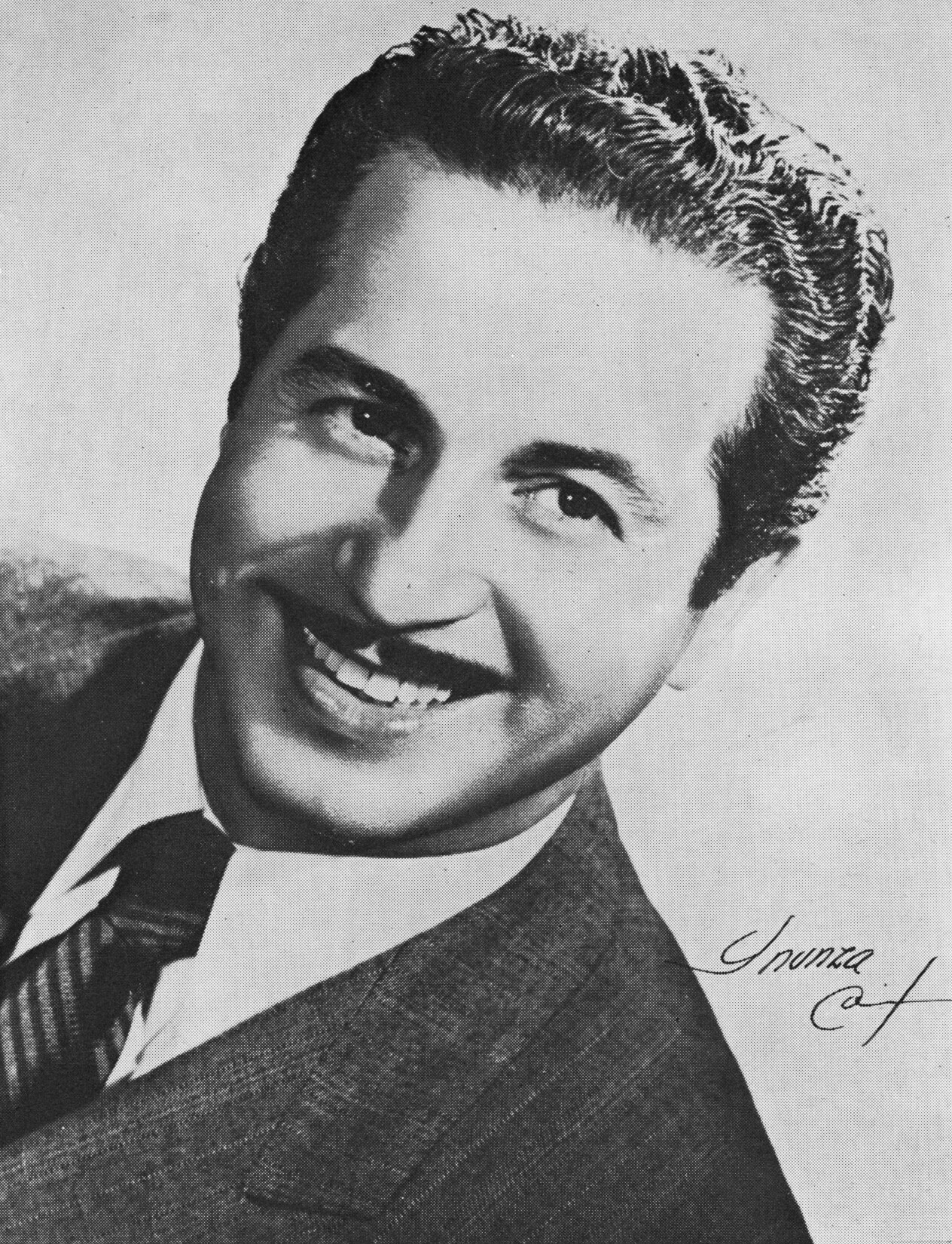
Alfredo Varela Jr. in 1954

Alfredo Varela Jr. (born Alfredo Varela Catalá; November 30, 1912 – May 1, 1986) was a Mexican screenwriter and actor best known for his comic screenplays.

== Selected filmography ==
- Here's the Point (1940)
- The Unknown Policeman (1941)
- To the Sound of the Marimba (1941)
- I'm a Real Mexican (1942)
- Divorced (1943)
- María Eugenia (1943)
- El Ametralladora (1943)
- The War of the Pastries (1944)
- Mischievous Susana (1945)
- Don't Marry My Wife (1947)
- The Genius (1948)
- Nocturne of Love (1948)
- Only Veracruz Is Beautiful (1949)
- Dos pesos dejada (1949)
- Love for Love (1950)
- The Dangerous Age (1950)
- We Maids (1951)
- In the Flesh (1951)
- My Wife Is Not Mine (1951)
- The Cry of the Flesh (1951)
- Dona Mariquita of My Heart (1953)
- The Loving Women (1953)
- My Father Was at Fault (1953)
- The Bandits of Cold River (1956)
- A Few Drinks (1958)
- Vacations in Acapulco (1961)
- El ojo de vidrio (1969)
- La casa de las muchachas (1969)
- Vuelve el ojo de vidrio (1970)
- La presidenta municipal (1975)
- La comadrita (1978)

== Bibliography ==
- Rogelio Agrasánchez. Guillermo Calles: A Biography of the Actor and Mexican Cinema Pioneer. McFarland, 2010.
