= Lupe Inclán =

Mexican film and stage actor

- Born: Guadalupe Inclán Delgado; 1895; San Luis Potosí, Mexico
- Died: 25 June 1956 (aged 60–61); Ciudad de Mexico, Mexico
- Occupation(s): Theatrical actress and movie actress
- Notable work: María Candelaria (1944)

Lupe Inclán (1895–1956) was a Mexican actress who became very popular in Mexican Carpa theatrical plays. She was also known for movies, mainly acting in supporting comic roles. She was known as one of the most prominent Mexican actresses interpreting village women in the 20th century.

== Biography ==
=== Early life ===
Lupe Inclán was born in 1895, in the family of María de Jesús Delgado and Miguel Inclán García, who both ran a travelling theater company. Her brother Miguel Inclán also became a renowned Mexican actor, known for his roles portraying villains.

In 1920, Lupe had two twin daughters, both of whom followed their mother's path and became theatrical actresses. Gloria Alicia, one of the daughters, later became the mother of Rafael Inclán, another prominent Mexican actor, who won the Ariel Award.

=== Theatrical Debut ===
Lupe Inclán officially debuted on 31 December 1919 with the play 19–20. Unfortunately, the play was controversial, since it depicted acts of the former president and the audience reacted poorly, resulting in the closure of the forum. After the failure of her debut, Inclán started working in companies and troupes of Carmen Martínez, the Tarazona brothers and de Julio Taboada, all well-known actors.

=== Film Debut ===
She made her movie debut in the early 1940s. Lupe mainly acted in supporting roles alongside comedians and great stars of the Golden Age of Mexican cinema. Her more influential and major roles include:

- The 9.15 Express (1941)
- Father Morelos (1943)
- María Candelaria (1944), by Emilio "Indio" Fernández,
- Capullito de alhelí (1945)
- Bodas trágicas (1946)
- Allá en el Rancho Grande (1949)
- El niño perdido (1947)
- If I'm to Be Killed Tomorrow (1947)
- Lola Casanova (1948)
- Las tandas del principal (1949)
- Soy charro de levita (1949)
- La marca del zorrillo (1950)
- Primero soy mexicano (1950)
- Cuando los hijos odian (1950)
- Red Rain (1950)
- Between Your Love and Heaven (1950)
- Get Your Sandwiches Here (1951)
- Tenement House (1951)
- El revoltoso (1951)
- Las mujeres de mi general (1951)
- El Niño y la niebla (1953)
- Penjamo (1953)
- Father Against Son (1955)
- Los bandidos de Río Frío (1956)
- Las aventuras de Pito Pérez (1957)

== Awards ==
=== Ariel Awards ===
Year	Category	Movie Title	Result
1947	Best Actress	Capullito de alhelí	Nominated
1950	Best Actress	Allá en el Rancho Grande	Nominated
