= The Eternal Secret =

1942 film by Carlos Orellana

- Directed by: Carlos Orellana
- Written by: Carlos Orellana
- Produced by: Jesús Grovas; Vicente Saisó Piquer
- Starring: Carlos Orellana; Marina Tamayo; David Silva
- Cinematography: Alex Phillips
- Edited by: Mario González
- Music by: Severo Muguerza
- Release date: 16 September 1942
- Running time: 103 minutes
- Country: Mexico
- Language: Spanish

The Eternal Secret (Spanish:Secreto eterno) is a 1942 Mexican drama film directed by Carlos Orellana and starring Orellana, Marina Tamayo and David Silva. The film's sets were designed by the art director Ramón Rodríguez Granada.

== Plot ==
In the early onset of the Mexican Revolution, a wealthy landowner, Ricardo Navarro, marries Lolita, a poor woman with a child. Ricardo already has two grown children, Luis and Teresa. Luis, a military member is very kind towards Lolita but Teresa is very capricious and disrespectful towards her as she thinks Lolita only wants to separate him from her father. Don Justo, a kind gentleman is friends with Lolita and Ricardo. Everything seems fine until one day when Luis is in the brink of ruin due to the fact that he stole the money trusted in him by his superiors in gambling. When Lolita hears about it she decides to sacrifice her pride and asks a favor from a gentleman, Señor Borja who previously stated he would do anything to help her. Luis pays back the money, but he feels so guilty that he decides to volunteer to the service in the revolution in order to amend himself. Meanwhile Teresa makes Ricardo think that Lolita is cheating on him with Borja, and afterwards Ricardo demands Lolita to leave. When he later receives a letter from Luis explaining everything, he asks Lolita for forgiveness. Eventually he confronts Teresa who states that she is leaving him forever. She then goes and marries Señor Borja out of spite. Ricardo dies from the shock and Lolita is forced into poverty.

Eventually Lolita is received with Señor Borja after Teresa has a change of heart and asks for forgiveness. To make amends for herself Teresa goes to help the revolutionaries with Don Justo and Luis. In an unfortunate set of circumstances, Borja tries to seduce Lolita who refuses his advances. Borja is then murdered by a revolutionary and Lolita is framed for the crime. In the commotion of her arrest her daughter is abandoned. She is picked up by a commissary and sent to a boarding house, where she is adopted, along with a rambunctious but kind hearted boy, Pablo, and is named María Ester after her adopted mother's mother.

14 years later, Pablo is a highly successful lawyer and has taken the case of Lolita after Don Justo petitions him to. Despite her being his adopted sister, he and Maria Ester elope and are engaged to marry. When Lolita is freed, she is hired by Pablo and Maria Ester to sew her wedding dress. When Maria Ester shows Lolita a picture on when she was a little girl Lolita has a commotion. Her adoptive mother comes by and sees Lolita's reaction, which worries her. She asks Lolita what she would do if Maria Ester was her daughter. Lolita states she would never tell her out of respect for her adoptive mother and to not sadden Maria Ester.

Lolita proceeds to confess about Maria Ester to Don Justo, who demands that she tell Maria Ester about her true parentage. Lolita is adamant in not doing so, but Don Justo states that he will. When he meets Maria Ester and Pablo, though, he backs himself. He then proceeds to make arrangements to meet up with Luis and Teresa, who have finished their service with their government. Maria Ester's adoptive mother then makes a cruel request to Lolita: She asks Lolita not to go to Maria Ester's wedding as she is an ex-convict. Lolita sadly but obediently complies.

After the wedding, Maria Ester and Pablo return home, where they see Lolita about to leave. Maria Ester demands to know why, and Lolita states that she needs to do some business. Maria Ester then states that she wants Lolita to work for her, and when her adoptive mother demands to know why, Maria Ester simply says that she cannot bear to be parted from Lolita. As Luis and Teresa wait for Don Justo, who asked them to come by to escort Lolita to their home, Don Justo appears. When Luis asks in Maria Ester knows the truth, Don Justo says she does, as he was not going to die with the secret.

== Cast ==
- Marina Tamayo as Lolita
- Carlos Orellana as Don Justo
- David Silva as Luis Navarro
- Matilde Palou as Emilia
- Miguel Ángel Ferriz as Eduardo
- Linda Gorráez as María Ester (adult)
- Enrique García Álvarez as Don Ricardo
- Alejandro Cobo as Señor Borja
- Azucena Rodríguez as María Ester (child)
- Miguel Ángel López as Pablo, niño
- Amanda del Llano as Novia de Luis
- Tony Díaz as Asesino de Borja
- Consuelo Segarra as Tomasa, sirvienta
- Carmen Collado as Directora de hospicio
- Salvador Quiroz as Abogado
- José Sánchez Ramirez
- María Claveria as Casera de don Justo
- Enriqueta Trueba as Asistente de hospicio
- Virginia Manzano as Teresa
- Armando Davila
- Rafael Banquells as Pablo, adulto
- Manuel Buendía as Repartidor de cartas
- Roberto Cañedo as Hombre entre multitud
- Joaquín Coss as Invitado a fiesta
- Ignacio Peón as Invitado a fiesta
- Joaquín Roche as Hombre en casino
- Humberto Rodríguez as Policía
- Arturo Soto Rangel as Coronel
- José Torvay as Policía

== Bibliography ==
- Camarero Calandria, Emma. Contenidos y formas en la vanguardia universitaria. Asociación Cultural y Científica Iberoamericana, 2015.
- Amador, María Luisa; Ayala Blanco, Jorge. Cartelera cinematográfica, 1940–1949. Centro Universitario de Estudios Cinematográficos, Universidad Nacional Autónoma de México, 1982.
- Gubern, Román. El cine español en el exilio. Lumen, 1976.
