= In the Times of Don Porfirio =

1939 film

- DVD cover
- Directed by: Juan Bustillo Oro
- Written by: Humberto Gómez Landero; Juan Bustillo Oro
- Produced by: Jesús Grovas
- Starring: Fernando Soler; Marina Tamayo; Emilio Tuero
- Cinematography: Jack Draper
- Edited by: Mario González
- Music by: Max Urban
- Production company: Oro Films
- Distributed by: Televisa
- Release date: 4 April 1940
- Running time: 160 minutes
- Country: Mexico
- Language: Spanish

In the Times of Don Porfirio (Spanish: En tiempos de Don Porfirio) is a 1939 Mexican musical film directed by Juan Bustillo Oro and starring Fernando Soler, Marina Tamayo, Emilio Tuero and Joaquín Pardavé. The film, adapted from a novel, nostalgically portrays the government of General and President Porfirio Díaz, who is played by Antonio R. Frausto, who played him in several films. The film was the highest-grossing Mexican film of the year.

== Cast ==
- Fernando Soler as don Francisco
- Marina Tamayo as Carmen
- Emilio Tuero as Fernando Villanueva
- Joaquín Pardavé as don Rodrigo
- Dolores Camarillo as Chole
- Aurora Walker as doña Carlota
- Agustín Isunza as Estebán
- Lucha María Ávila as Carmen, niña
- Victoria Argota as doña Etelvina
- Conchita Gentil Arcos as doña Julia
- Humberto Rodríguez
- Manuel Noriega
- Armando Velasco as don Germán
- Gerardo del Castillo
- Emilio Romero
- Adolfo Bernáldez
- Manuel Pozos as don Luis
- Max Langler as don Fulgencio
- Manuel Zoca
- Julio Ahuet
- Roberto Cañedo as Extra
- Antonio R. Frausto as Porfirio Díaz
- José Elías Moreno as Invitado a baile
- Aurora Ruiz as Sirvienta

== Release and reception ==
The film was the highest-grossing Mexican film in its year of release at the box office. The author Carl J. Mora wrote that "the nostalgia it evoked of a simpler and more peaceful epoch could also be interpreted as a rejection by the middle class of the more socialistic aspects of the Revolution. The appearance in the film of such popular actors as Fernando Soler, the Spanish immigrant Emilio Tuero, and the fine comic actor Joaquín Pardavé were also potent factors in the movie's success. In their book Culture and Customs of Mexico - Peter Standish and Steven M. Bell describe the film as a "political extreme", in that the "film's nostalgia for the stable hierarchies of pre-Revolutionary days arguably provided some comfort to the sectors of society that felt threatened by the Cardenas government's land redistribution and nationalization programmes". Colin Gunckel, Jan-Christopher Horak and Lisa Jarvinen described the film as a "political revista that utilized zarzuela melodies popular during the Porfiriato". Jacqueline Avila compared it to Mexico de mis recuerdos (1944), describing them as "two noteworthy films that intertwine musical performances in the narratives and expose the social contradictions of Porfirian culture, particularly concerning women's roles".

== Bibliography ==
- Segre, Erica. Intersected Identities: Strategies of Visualisation in Nineteenth- and Twentieth-century Mexican Culture. Berghahn Books, 2007.
