= Simón Bolívar (1942 film) =

- Directed by: Miguel Contreras Torres
- Written by: Miguel Contreras Torres
- Produced by: Miguel Contreras Torres; Jesús Grovas
- Starring: Julián Soler; Marina Tamayo; Carlos Orellana; Margarita Mora
- Cinematography: Jack Draper
- Edited by: Mario González
- Music by: Federico Ruiz
- Release date: 15 July 1942
- Country: Mexico
- Language: Spanish

Simón Bolívar is a 1942 Mexican historical drama film written, directed and produced by Miguel Contreras Torres and starring Julián Soler, Marina Tamayo and Carlos Orellana. It is a biopic of the revolutionary Simón Bolívar who fought to end Spanish rule over much of Latin America.

== Cast ==
- Julián Soler - Simón Bolívar
- Marina Tamayo - Manuela Sáenz
- Carlos Orellana - General José Antonio Páez
- Margarita Mora - Josefina Machado
- Anita Blanch - Fanny du Villars
- Domingo Soler - General Jacinto Lara
- Pedro Armendáriz - General Briceño Méndez
- Julio Villarreal - General Pablo Morillo
- Carlos López Moctezuma - General José Tomás Boves
- Francisco Jambrina - Mariscal Antonio José de Sucre
- Miguel Inclán - Sargento Pérez
- Carmen Molina - María Teresa del Toro
- Tito Junco - General Francisco de Paula Santander
- Alberto G. Vázquez - General José de San Martín
- Víctor Manuel Mendoza - La Mar
- Víctor Urruchúa - General José María Córdova
- Miguel Tamayo - Generalisimo Francisco de Miranda
- Eduardo González Pliego - General Carlos Soublette
- Felipe Montoya - General Mariano Montilla
- Ricardo Beltri - Canónigo Córtes de Madariega
- Alberto Espinoza - General Jose Félix Rivas
- Manuel Dondé - General Manuel Piar
- Manuel Fábregas - Fernando Bolívar
- Francisco Laboriel - Pedro Camejo
- Carlos L. Cabello - General William Miller
- Arturo Soto Rangel - Marqués y Coronel del Toro
- Max Meyer - Barón Alejandro de Humboldt
- Feliciano Rueda - Doctor Prospero Reverand
- Ricardo Carti - Bacuero
- Ernesto Finance - Obispo Estevez
- Luis G. Barreiro - General Barreiro
- José Pidal - General Domingo Monteverde
- Ramón G. Larrea - La Torre
- Victorio Blanco - Renovales
- Consuelo de Alba - Anita L. Blanchard
- Margarita Cortés - María Antonia Bolívar
- Mercedes Cortés - Juana Bolívar
- Conchita Gentil Arcos - Señora del Toro
