= Enrique García Álvarez (actor) =

Spanish-Mexican actor (1896–1971)

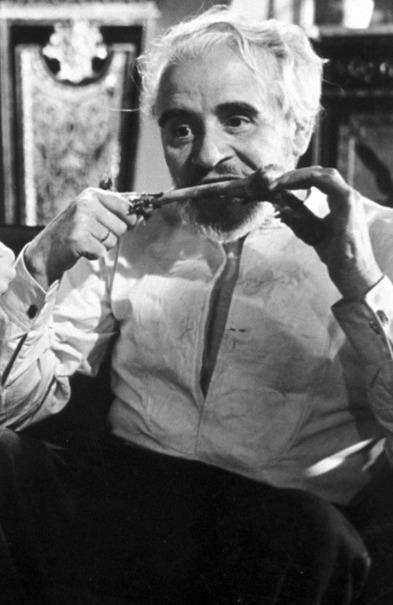
- Álvarez in El ángel exterminador (1962)
- Born: 1896; Langreo, Asturias, Spain
- Died: 1971 (aged 74–75); Valencia, Spain
- Occupation: Actor

Enrique García Álvarez (1896–1971) was a Spanish-Mexican actor.

== Early life and career ==
García Álvarez was born in Langreo, Asturias in 1896. He began his career in 1922. In 1938, near the end of the Spanish Civil War, he fled to Paris, France, where he was helped by Maurice Chevalier, with which help he went into exile Mexico, where he would establish and live until shortly before his death. He debuted in the cinema in Mexico in 1940, where he would work with Cantinflas and Luis Buñuel in the latter's Mexican phase. He founded the magazine La Voz del Actor and received the Diosas de Plata award (from the Cinematographic Journalists of Mexico, PECIME) for his role in Buñuel's The Exterminating Angel (1962).

García Álvarez was married to Carmen Collado and died of a heart attack in 1971 (other sources erroneously state 1973) in Valencia, his wife's hometown, where she was recovering from an eye operation.

== Filmography ==
- The 9.15 Express (1941)
- The Eternal Secret (1942)
- Resurrection (1943)
- Les Misérables (1943)
- The Lieutenant Nun (1944)
- A Woman's Diary (1944)
- Symphony of Life (1946)
- The Operetta Queen (1946)
- Five Faces of Woman (1947)
- Jalisco Fair (1948)
- The Genius (1948)
- The Magician (1949)
- She and I (1951)
- Get Your Sandwiches Here (1951)
- The Martyr of Calvary (1952)
- Pain (1953)
- La intrusa (1954)
- Tehuantepec (1954)
- The Price of Living (1954)
- Adventures of Joselito and Tom Thumb (1960)
- The Exterminating Angel (1962)
- Simon of the Desert (1965)
- The Partisan of Villa (1967)

== Bibliography ==
- Arjona, Manuel Palomino. Dramaturgia Asturiana Contemporánea. Lulu, 2019. ISBN 978-0-244-74254-6
