= Raúl Lavista =

Mexican composer

- Born: 31 October 1913; Mexico
- Died: 19 October 1980 (aged 66); Mexico
- Occupation: Composer
- Years active: 1936–1980

Raúl Lavista (31 October 1913 – 19 October 1980) was a Mexican composer of film scores. Lavista worked prolifically during the Golden Age of Mexican cinema, and was credited on more than three hundred different productions. He is the father of the photographer Paulina Lavista.

== Selected filmography ==
- Judas (1936)
- I Will Live Again (1940)
- Here's the Point (1940)
- The 9.15 Express (1941)
- Oh, What Times, Don Simon! (1941)
- The Count of Monte Cristo (1942)
- Another Dawn (1943)
- Divorced (1943)
- The White Monk (1945)
- Twilight (1945)
- Everybody's Woman (1946)
- Women in the Night (1948)
- Beau Ideal (1948)
- Two of the Angry Life (1948)
- Sofia (1948)
- Nocturne of Love (1948)
- Corner Stop (1948)
- Philip of Jesus (1949)
- The Black Sheep (1949)
- A Family Like Many Others (1949)
- The Woman I Lost (1949)
- Zorina (1949)
- Confessions of a Taxi Driver (1949)
- Over the Waves (1950)
- You Shall Not Covet Thy Son's Wife (1950)
- The Man Without a Face (1950)
- Full Speed Ahead (1951)
- What Has That Woman Done to You? (1951)
- In the Palm of Your Hand (1951)
- Kill Me Because I'm Dying! (1951)
- Girls in Uniform (1951)
- Women's Prison (1951)
- Crime and Punishment (1951)
- Tenement House (1951)
- The Night Falls (1952)
- If I Were a Congressman (1952)
- Sister Alegría (1952)
- The Woman You Want (1952)
- The Atomic Fireman (1952)
- The Coward (1953)
- The Photographer (1953)
- Women Who Work (1953)
- Tehuantepec (1954)
- The Price of Living (1954)
- A Life in the Balance (1955)
- The Murderer X (1955)
- The Medallion Crime (1956)
- Arm in Arm Down the Street (1956)
- Daniel Boone, Trail Blazer (1956)
- To Each His Life (1960)
- Macario (1960)
- So Loved Our Fathers (1964)
- The She-Wolf (1965)
- Alma llanera (1965)
- The Incredible Professor Zovek (1972)

== Bibliography ==
- McKay, James (26 April 2010). Dana Andrews: The Face of Noir. McFarland. ISBN 978-0-7864-5676-5.
