= Humberto Gómez Landero =

Mexican screenwriter and film director

- Born: 1904; Orizaba, Veracruz, Mexico
- Died: June 27, 1968 (aged 63–64); Mexico City, Mexico
- Occupations: Screenwriter, Director
- Years active: 1938 - 1969 (film)

Humberto Gómez Landero (1904–1968) was a Mexican screenwriter and film director.

== Selected filmography ==
=== Screenwriter ===
- Huapango (1938)
- The Girl's Aunt (1938)
- Horse for Horse (1939)
- Every Madman to His Specialty (1939)
- In the Times of Don Porfirio (1940)
- The Stronger Sex (1946)
- Two of the Angry Life (1948)
- Only Veracruz Is Beautiful (1949)
- Every Child a Cross to Bear (1957)
- So Loved Our Fathers (1964)

=== Director ===
- The Disobedient Son (1945)
- The Noiseless Dead (1946)
- The Lost Child (1947)
- Music Inside (1947)
- Music, Poetry and Madness (1948)
- Our Hateful Husbands (1962)

== Bibliography ==
- Daniel Balderston, Mike Gonzalez & Ana M. Lopez. Encyclopedia of Contemporary Latin American and Caribbean Cultures. Routledge, 2002.
