= Dos mexicanos en Sevilla =

- Starring: Carlos Orellana
- Release date: 1942
- Country: Mexico
- Language: Spanish

Dos mexicanos en Sevilla ("Two Mexicans in Seville") is a 1942 Mexican film. It stars Carlos Orellana. It was made as part of a series of Mexican films set in Spain in the 1940s, such as El verdugo de Sevilla (1942).
