= Luis G. Barreiro =

Mexican actor

- Born: Luis Gonzaga Barreiro Zapian; 31 August 1886; Mexico City, Mexico
- Died: 24 May 1947 (aged 60); Mexico City, Mexico
- Occupation: Actor
- Years active: 1921 - 1947 (film)

Luis G. Barreiro (1886–1947) was a Mexican film actor.

== Selected filmography ==
- Martín Garatuza (1935)
- Such Is My Country (1937)
- Heads or Tails (1937)
- These Men (1937)
- Beautiful Mexico (1938)
- Horse for Horse (1939)
- I Will Live Again (1940)
- Oh, What Times, Don Simon! (1941)
- The Unknown Policeman (1941)
- Simón Bolívar (1942)
- Father Gets Entangled Again (1942)
- Caminito alegre (1944)
- Miguel Strogoff (1944)
- The Daughter of the Regiment (1944)
- Gran Hotel (1944)
- Mischievous Susana (1945)
- The Disobedient Son (1945)
- Rosalinda (1945)
- Canaima (1945)
- The Queen of the Tropics (1946)
- The Associate (1946)
- Boom in the Moon (1946)
- Symphony of Life (1946)
- The Tiger of Jalisco (1947)
- Strange Obsession (1947)
- The Lost Child (1947)
- Spurs of Gold (1948)

== Bibliography ==
- Rogelio Agrasánchez. Guillermo Calles: A Biography of the Actor and Mexican Cinema Pioneer. McFarland, 2010.
