= Juan Bustillo Oro =

Mexican filmmaker (1904–1989)

- Born: 2 June 1904; Mexico City, Mexico
- Died: 10 June 1989 (aged 85); Mexico City, Mexico
- Occupations: Film screenwriter, director and producer
- Years active: 1927–1965

Juan Bustillo Oro (2 June 1904 – 10 June 1989) was a Mexican film director, screenwriter and producer, whose career spanned over 38 years.

Among his works there are In the Times of Don Porfirio, Here's the Point, Arm in Arm Down the Street, Cuando los hijos se van and those listed below.

== Selected filmography ==
- Two Monks (1934)
- The Mystery of the Ghastly Face (1935)
- Poppy of the Road (1937)
- Huapango (1938)
- The Girl's Aunt (1938)
- Horse for Horse (1939)
- Every Madman to His Specialty (1939)
- To the Sound of the Marimba (1941)
- The Black Angel (1942)
- My Memories of Mexico (1944)
- It's Not Enough to Be a Charro (1946)
- Two of the Angry Life (1948)
- Only Veracruz Is Beautiful (1949)
- The Man Without a Face (1950)
- Doctor on Call (1950)
- Tenement House (1951)
- Get Your Sandwiches Here (1951)
- Among Lawyers I See You (1951)
- The Trace of Some Lips (1952)
- Seven Women (1953)
- The Murderer X (1955)
- Father Against Son (1955)
- The Medallion Crime (1956)
- Every Child a Cross to Bear (1957)
- So Loved Our Fathers (1964)
