= Marina Tamayo =

Mexican actress (1919–2005)

Marina Tamayo (I)
- Born: September 27, 1919; Monterrey, Nuevo León, Mexico
- Died: September 20, 2005 (aged 85); Mexico City, Mexico
- Other name: Marina Tamayo Sort
- Occupation: Actress
- Years active: 1937–1942 (film)

Marina Tamayo (I) (September 27, 1919 – September 20, 2005) was a Mexican film actress. She appeared in seventeen films during the Golden age of Mexican cinema.

== Selected filmography ==
- Heads or Tails (1937)
- These Men (1937)
- Las mujeres mandan (1937)
- In the Times of Don Porfirio (1940)
- To the Sound of the Marimba (1941)
- The Eternal Secret (1942)
- The Black Angel (1942)
