= List of Mexican films of 1949 =

This is a list of the films produced in Mexico in 1949, ordered alphabetically. (see 1949 in film):

== 1949 ==
Title	Director	Cast	Genre	Notes
1949
Angels of the Arrabal	Raúl de Anda	Sofía Álvarez, David Silva, Carmelita González	Crime	
Bamba	Miguel Contreras Torres	Carmen Montejo, Víctor Manuel Mendoza, Andrés Soler, Tito Junco, Silvia Pinal		
The Black Sheep	Ismael Rodríguez	Fernando Soler, Pedro Infante, Andrés Soler	Drama	
Confessions of a Taxi Driver	Alejandro Galindo	Adalberto Martinez, Lilia Prado, Julio Villarreal	Comedy	
Don't Love Me So Much	Chano Urueta	David Silva, Martha Roth, Arturo Martínez	Crime drama	
The Fallen Angel	Juan José Ortega	Rafael Baledón, Rosita Quintana, Dalia Íñiguez	Drama	
A Family Like Many Others	Alejandro Galindo	Fernando Soler, David Silva, Martha Roth	Drama	
A Galician in Mexico	Julián Soler	Niní Marshall, Joaquín Pardavé, Alma Rosa Aguirre	Comedy	
El gran calavera	Luis Buñuel	Fernando Soler, Andres Soler		
Jalisco Sings in Seville	Fernando de Fuentes	Jorge Negrete, Carmen Sevilla, Jesús Tordesillas	Musical	Co-production with Spain
The Lady of the Veil	Alfredo B. Crevenna	Libertad Lamarque, Armando Calvo, Ernesto Alonso	Drama	
Love in Every Port	Ernesto Cortázar	Blanca Estela Pavón, Domingo Soler, Amalia Aguilar	Musical drama	
Midnight	Tito Davison	Arturo de Córdova, Elsa Aguirre, Marga López	Crime	
Only Veracruz Is Beautiful	Juan Bustillo Oro	Esther Fernández, Antonio Badú, Alfredo Varela	Comedy	
Pueblerina	Emilio Fernández	Columba Domínguez, Roberto Cañedo		
Las puertas del presidio	Emilio Gómez Muriel	David Silva, Blanca Estela Pavón, Andrés Soler, Ferrusquilla, Miguel Manzano		
El rey del barrio	Gilberto Martínez Solares	Tin Tan, Silvia Pinal		
Salón México	Emilio Fernández	Marga López, Miguel Inclán, Rodolfo Acosta	Film noir	
Tender Pumpkins	Gilberto Martínez Solares	Tin Tan, Rosita Quintana, Amalia Aguilar	Comedy	
Dos pesos dejada	Joaquín Pardavé	Sara García, Abel Salazar, Alicia Caro	Comedy drama	
La Malquerida	Emilio Fernández	Dolores del Río, Pedro Armendáriz, Columba Domínguez		
Venus de Fuego	Jaime Salvador	Meche Barba, Fernando Fernández		
Witch's Corner	Alberto Gout	Gloria Marín, Víctor Junco, Armando Silvestre	Drama	
The Woman of the Port	Emilio Gómez Muriel	María Antonieta Pons, Víctor Junco	Drama	
Negra Consentida	Julián Soler	Meche Barba		
El seminarista	Roberto Rodríguez	Pedro Infante, Silvia Derbez, Katy Jurado		
Zorina	Juan José Ortega	Leonora Amar, Rafael Baledón, Luis Aldás		
Una Gallega en México				
Hipócrita	Miguel Morayta	Leticia Palma, Antonio Badú		
Jalisco Sings in Seville	Fernando de Fuentes	Jorge Negrete, Carmen Sevilla		
El Pecádo de Laura	Julián Soler	Meche Barba, Silvia Pinal		
Dicen que soy mujeriego	Roberto Rodríguez	Pedro Infante, Silvia Derbéz, Amalia Aguilar		
The Woman I Lost	Roberto Rodríguez	Pedro Infante, Blanca Estela Pavón, Silvia Pinal	Drama	
Autumn and Spring	Adolfo Fernández Bustamante			
Café de chinos	Carlos Orellana	Carlos Orellana, Abel Salazar, Amanda del Llano		
Canta y no llores...	Alfonso Patiño Gómez	Irma Vila, Carlos López Moctezuma		
Coqueta	Fernando A. Rivero	Ninón Sevilla, Agustín Lara, Víctor Junco		
El colmillo de Buda				
El diablo no es tan diablo	Julián Soler	Sara García, Julián Soler, Amparo Morillo, Fernando Soto		
Eterna agonía		Sara García		
Las tandas del principal	Fernando de Fuentes			
Los amores de una viuda	Julián Soler			
No me defiendas compadre				
Opium	Ramón Peón			
Philip of Jesus	Julio Bracho	Ernesto Alonso, Rita Macedo, Julio Villarreal		
Rough But Respectable	Gilberto Martínez Solares	Germán Valdés, Rosita Quintana		
The Bewitched House	Fernando A. Rivero	David T. Bamberg, Katy Jurado		
The Magician	Miguel M. Delgado	Cantinflas, Leonora Amar, José Baviera		
The Perez Family	Gilberto Martínez Solares	Joaquín Pardavé, Sara García, Manuel Fábregas		
Un cuerpo de mujer				
