= List of Mexican films of 1940 =

This is a list of the films produced in Mexico in 1940, ordered alphabetically (see 1940 in film):

== 1940 ==
Title	Director	Cast	Genre	Notes
1940
Allá en el trópico	Fernando de Fuentes	Tito Guízar, Esther Fernández and Carlos López Moctezuma	Musical comedy drama	
Amor d mis amores	René Cardona	Lili del Callejo, José Cibrián, Josefina Escobedo, Rafael Falcón	Drama	
Borrasca humana	José Bohr	Carlos Orellana	Drama	
El charro Negro	Raúl de Anda	Raúl de Anda, Emilio Fernández, María Luisa Zea, Miguel Ángel Ferriz	Western adventure	
Con su amable permiso	Fernando Soler	Fernando Soler, René Cardona, Virginia Serret, Eduardo Arozamena	Comedy drama	
Diablillos de arrabal	Adela Sequeyro	José Emilio Pineda, Enrique Olivar, Alberto Islas, Antonio Mendoza Botello	Drama	
Harvest of Fate (Odio)	William Rowland	Fernando Soler, Arturo de Córdova, Magda Haller, Antonio Bravo	Romantic drama	
Herencia macabra	José Bohr	Miguel Arenas, Consuelo Frank and Ramón Armengod		
The Hypnotist	Antonio Helú	Carmen Hermosillo, Carlos López Moctezuma		
Hombre o demonio	Miguel Contreras Torres	Arturo de Córdova, Medea de Novara, Narciso Busquets		
I Will Live Again	Roberto Rodríguez	Adriana Lamar, Joaquín Pardavé, David Silva	Drama	
El jefe máximo	Fernando de Fuentes			
Los de abajo	Chano Urueta	Emilio Fernández, Isabela Corona		
The Midnight Ghost (El fantasma de medianoche)	Raphael J. Sevilla	Victoria Blanco, Sergio de Karlo, Carlos López Moctezuma, Emma Roldán	Horror	
Mi madrecita		Sara García		
Miente y serás feliz	Raphael J. Sevilla	Carlos Orellana, Sara García, Emilio Tuero, Josefina Escobedo	Comedy	
The Miracle Song (La canción del huérfano)	Rolando Aguilar	Carlos Orellana, José Lupita Gallardo and Estela Inda	Musical drama	
Mother By Compulsion (Madre a la fuerza)	Robert Quigley	María Conesa, Alfredo del Diestro, Susana Guízar, Tomás Perrín	Drama	
Narciso's Hard Luck (Los apuros de Narciso)	Enrique Herrera	Enrique Herrera	Comedy	
Poor Devil (Pobre diablo)	José Benavides	Fernando Soler, Manolita Saval, Carlos Orellana, Pedro Armendáriz	Comedy drama	
El secreto de la monja		Carlos Orellana		
Viviré otra vez	Roberto Rodríguez	Adriana Lamar, David Silva, Joaquín Pardavé		
You're Missing the Point (Ahí está el detalle)	Juan Bustillo Oro	Cantinflas, Joaquín Pardavé, Sara García		
