= ¡Ay, Jalisco, no te rajes! (film) =

1941 film directed by Joselito Rodríguez

- Directed by: Joselito Rodríguez
- Written by: Ernesto Cortázar; Ismael Rodríguez; Joselito Rodríguez; Roberto Rodríguez; Luis Leal Solares; Aurelio Robles Castillo
- Starring: Jorge Negrete; Gloria Marín; Carlos López; Evita Muñoz; Ángel Garasa
- Edited by: Jorge Bustos
- Music by: Ernesto Cortázar; Manuel Esperón
- Release date: 1941
- Running time: 100 minutes
- Country: Mexico
- Language: Spanish

¡Ay, Jalisco, no te rajes! (English: "Jalisco, don't back down") is a 1941 Mexican film directed by Joselito Rodríguez, and starring Jorge Negrete, Gloria Marín and Carlos López. It is the prequel to the film El Ametralladora, starring Pedro Infante in the role as Salvador Pérez Gómez 'El Ametralladora'. It is based on the book ¡Ay, Jalisco, no te rajes! by Aurelio Robles Castillo. Evita Muñoz was five years old when she played the character Chachita in the film, and also earning her the nickname she was known by for the length of her career. It was released at the Cine Olimpia on November 12, 1941.

Jorge Negrete and Gloria Marín first met at the reading for the film and, although Negrete was already married, they both had chemistry both on and off the camera which became evident in the film. After the movie they remained friends, and when Negrete returned from New York to film his next movie, they began a stormy relationship that lasted several years.

== Songs ==
- ¡Ay, Jalisco, no te rajes! by Manuel Esperón, Ernesto Cortázar
- Traigo un amor
- Fue Casualidad
- Cuando habla el corazón
- Chachita
- La Vibora
- Coplas
- Secreto de amor

== Plot ==
The film takes place in Jalisco, during the turbulent Mexican Revolution. After young Salvador's (Negrete) parents are killed, he is cared for by his godfather Radilla (Bravo) who owns a cantina, and his parents ranch hand Chaflán (López). Radilla teaches Salvador, known as Chavo, how to "play cards, shoot guns, herd cattle, and distrust women". Salvador vows to avenge the death of his parents.

It is now ten years later, El Malasuerte (the Unlucky one) is drinking in Radilla's bar, he has come to see Salvador, now a grown man, to make a deal with him, when he is shot by a man just outside the door. Carmela is crossing the road with her five year old niece, Chachita, when several fast moving horseback riders travel through town. Carmela safely reaches the other side, and is not aware that Chachita is not right behind her. Salvador rushes to the middle of the road and protects the little girl, then carries her to her aunt after the horses have passed through. Salvador hears Carmela call the girl "Chachita", and he asks her if that is her name, and she replies "No, my name is Ana María del Pilar López de la Cadena, but since my name is very long they call me Chachita". Chachita takes a liking to Salvador, who takes the time to talk to her and listen to what she says, while the little girl is busy playing matchmaker.

Later Carmela and Chachita spend time with Salvador in the park, who again is very kind to the little girl. After he has to leave, Felipe Carbajal asks Carmela to marry him, she declines saying she just wants to be friends. Chachita tries to talk to Felipe and he tells her to go away, but Carmela thinks that's a very good idea and the two leave Felipe by himself. General Carbajal (Sala), who is also the mayor and Mr. Salas (Soto Rangel) are discussing a business deal, when Felipe returns home and complains that Carmela has declined to marry him. The general announces that if Mr. Salas' daughter won't marry his son the deal is off. Salas will be forced to coerce Carmela to marry Felipe in order to save their ranch.

El Malasuerte, now recovering in Radilla's private residence in the cantina, proposes a deal with Salvador. He admits to being there when his parents were killed, and would like to money in exchange for the names of those responsible for their deaths.

Salvador, with a list of names from Malasuerte, travels to Guadalajara to kill the men that were responsible for the death of his parents, his rapid shooting style earns him the nickname "El Ametralladora" (the machine gun). When he returns to Jalisco he serenades Caramela outside her window when Felipe arrives, and the two men take turns serenading her in a type of music duel, however Felipe has a proxy sing to her as he doesn't sing.

The general holds a horse race in which Salvador and Felipe will compete for Carmela's hand in marriage. Before the race, with Chachita's intervention, Carmela admits to Salavador that she loves him, he tells her they will go away to Guadalajara. Salavador wins the race and he, Chaflán and Malasuerte confront the general with the inspector present. The inspector admits to being just as guilty and he shoots and kills Malasuerte. Later Salvador and Chaflán ride away alongside Carmela and Chachita in a horse and carriage.

== Cast ==
- Jorge Negrete as Salvador Pérez Gómez 'El Ametralladora'
- Gloria Marín as Carmela
- Carlos López as Chaflán
- Ángel Garasa as El Malasuerte
- Evita Muñoz as Chachita
- Víctor Manuel Mendoza as Felipe Carbajal
- Miguel Inclán as Chueco Gallegos
- Antonio Bravo as Radilla
- Arturo Soto Rangel as Mr. Salas
- Ángel T. Sala as General Carbajal
- Manuel Noriega as the inspector
- Max Langler as El Zorro
- Narciso Busquets as Juancho
- Pepe del Río as Chava (young Salvador)
- Lucha Reyes
- Antonio Badú
- Trío Tariácuri (as Los Tariácuris)
- Trío Ascensio del Rio (as Trío del Río)
- Luis Díaz
- David Valle González
- José Torvay
- Julio Ahuet
- Roberto Cañedo
