= Cupido pierde a Paquita =

- Directed by: Ismael Rodríguez
- Written by: Carlos Orellana; Ismael Rodríguez
- Produced by: Ismael Rodríguez
- Starring: Carlos Orellana; María Victoria
- Cinematography: Manuel Gómez Urquiza
- Edited by: Fernando Martínez
- Music by: Rosalío Martínez
- Production company: Películas Rodríguez
- Release date: October 15, 1955
- Running time: 90 minute
- Country: Mexico
- Language: Spanish

Cupido pierde a Paquita ("Cupid Loses Paquita") is a 1955 Mexican film starring Carlos Orellana and María Victoria. It is the sequel of the film Los paquetes de Paquita (1954).

== Cast ==
- María Victoria as Paquita (as Maria Victoria 'Paquita')
- Julio Aldama as Julio
- Carlos Orellana as don Severo
- Fernando Soto "Mantequilla" as Firulais; Espiridión (as Fernando Soto 'Mantequilla')
- Malú Azcárraga as Rosita
- Carlos Martínez Baena as don Feliciano
- Javier de la Parra as Pepe
- Paz Villegas as doña Sofía
- Carmen Manzano as Juana la charrasqueada
- Lola Casanova as Adela
- Tito Novaro as Muñeco
- José Pardavé as Juan, chofer
