= Las Mañanitas =

Mexican birthday song

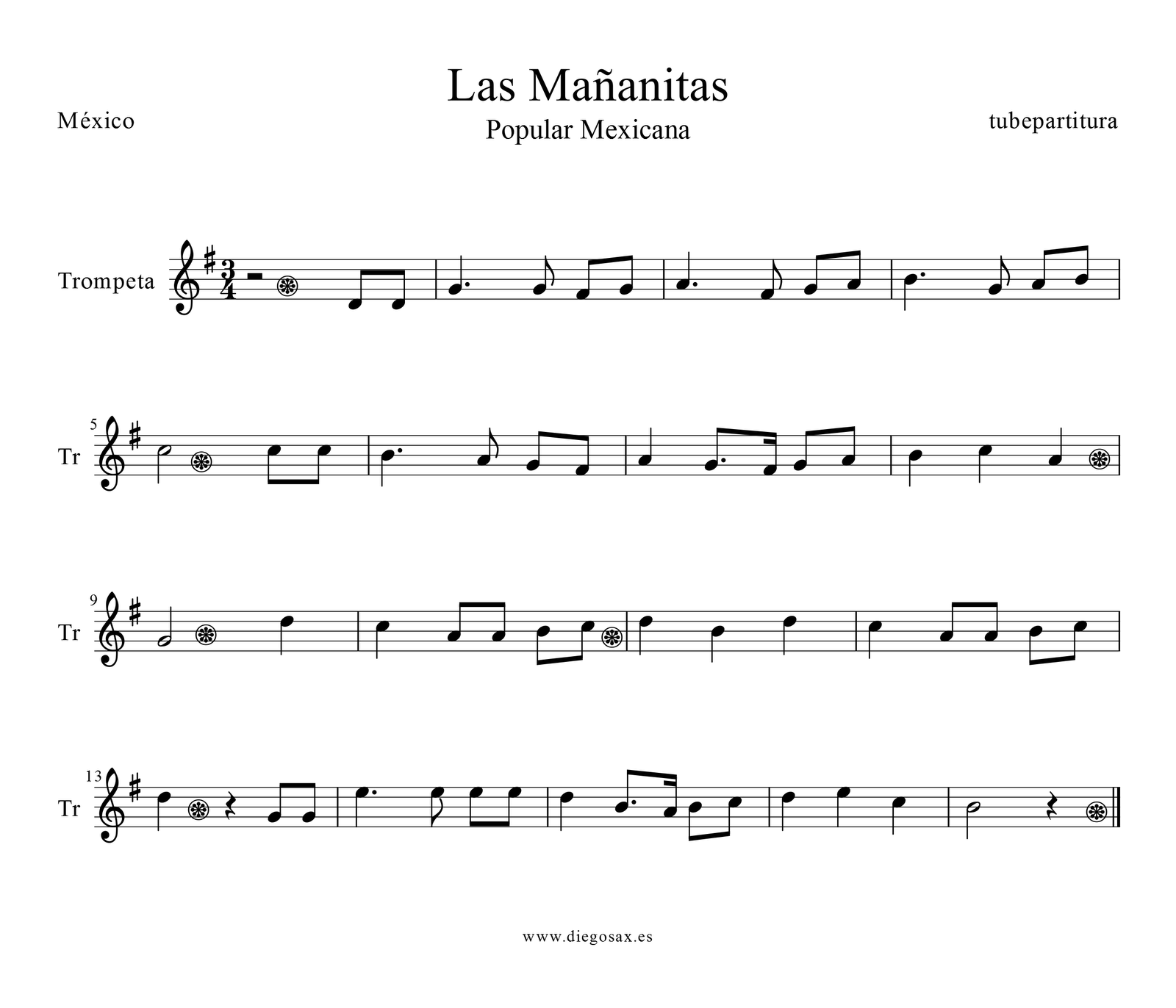

"Las Mañanitas" (Spanish pronunciation: [las maɲaˈnitas]) is a traditional Mexican birthday song written by Mexican composer Alfonso Esparza Oteo. It is popular in Mexico, usually sung early in the morning to awaken the birthday person, and especially as part of the custom of serenading women. A famous rendition of "Las Mañanitas" is sung by Pedro Infante to "Chachita" in the movie Nosotros los pobres. It is also sung in English in The Leopard Man (1943).

== Lyrics ==
Spanish original

Estas son las mañanitas
que cantaba el rey David
hoy por ser tu cumpleaños, te las cantamos a ti.

Despierta, mi bien (o nombre), despierta
mira que ya amaneció,
ya los pajaritos cantan, la luna ya se metió.

Qué linda está la mañana,
en que vengo a saludarte,
Venimos todos con gusto
y placer a felicitarte,

El día en que tú naciste,
nacieron todas las flores,
En la pila del bautismo,
cantaron los ruiseñores,

Ya viene amaneciendo,
ya la luz del día nos dio,
Levántate de mañana,
Mira que ya amaneció.

English translation

These are “The Beloved Mornings”
of which King David used to sing.
Because today is your birthday;
we sing them to you.

Wake up, my love (or name), wake up.
See that it is already dawn,
The little birds are already singing,
The moon has already set.

How pretty is the morning
In which I come to greet you.
We all came with pleasure
and joy to congratulate you.

On the day you were born
All the flowers were born.
At the baptismal font
The nightingales sang.

It is starting to dawn,
The day has given us light.
Get up in the morning,
Look that it has already dawned.

=== Lyrics with melody ===
Often when sung instead of played from a recording, "mi bien" ("my dear") is replaced with the name of the person being greeted, e.g. "Despierta, Jacob, despierta, mira que ya amaneció." Monosyllabic names are stretched across the two original notes, while longer or compound names are often elided to fit the music, such as Guadalupe or José Alberto would be sung "Josealberto", creating a diphthong in the second syllable.

In some regions, the second line of the first stanza is replaced with "...a las muchachas bonitas se las cantamos aquí" ("...to the pretty girls we sing them here"). Years ago, it was custom to name a child after a patron saint whose feast fell on the day they was born (see Calendar of saints).. Another secular alternative is, "hoy por ser tu cumpleaños" ("for today is your birthday").

The song is usually set in the key of A major at a 3/4 time signature at the first 2 stanzas with tempos between 90 and 100 beats per minute, then shifts to a 6/8 time signature for the rest of the song.

== Mexico ==
Every year, on the eve of 12 December, mañanitas are sung to honor Our Lady of Guadalupe by Mexico's most famous and popular artists in the Basilica of Our Lady of Guadalupe.

== United States ==
=== New Mexico ===
In the US State of New Mexico, Las Mañanitas is sometimes sung as an honorary song during birthday celebrations, for both men and women. One such example was during a live performance for Al Hurricane's 75th birthday. During the concert setlist, it was recorded by Al Hurricane Jr. and Christian Sanchez as a rendition alongside the English-language Happy Birthday to You. The concert was later released as an album mastered by Lorenzo Antonio.

=== Puerto Rico ===
Las Mañanitas are also an annual event held in Ponce, Puerto Rico, dedicated to Our Lady of Guadalupe. It consists of a pre-dawn festival parade and a Catholic Mass, followed by a popular breakfast. The celebration started in 1964, but its precise origin is uncertain. Some say it was begun by immigrant Mexican engineers, while others point to Spaniards from Extremadura. The early morning, pre-dawn celebration is attended by over 10,000 people, including mayors and other prominent figures. The civic government of Ponce offers free breakfasts to those present at the historic Ponce City Hall after the Mass.

== See also ==
- List of birthday songs
