= Pepe the Bull =

1953 film

- Spanish: Pepe El Toro
- Directed by: Ismael Rodríguez
- Written by: Carlos Orellana; Ismael Rodríguez; Pedro de Urdimalas
- Starring: Pedro Infante; Evita Muñoz "Chachita"; Amanda del Llano
- Cinematography: Ignacio Torres
- Edited by: Fernando Martínez
- Music by: Manuel Esperón
- Production company: Producciones Rodríguez Hermanos
- Release date: 21 August 1953
- Running time: 120 minutes
- Country: Mexico
- Language: Spanish

Pepe the Bull (Spanish: Pepe El Toro) is a 1953 Mexican sports drama film directed by Ismael Rodríguez and starring Pedro Infante, Evita Muñoz "Chachita" and Amanda del Llano. It was the last part in a trilogy of films featuring Infante and Muñoz playing the father and daughter characters (Pepe El Toro and Chachita, respectively) in the 1948 releases Nosotros los Pobres (We the Poor) and Ustedes los ricos (You the Rich). A planned fourth film in the series was cancelled when Infante died in 1957. The film was nominated for four Ariel Awards.

== Cast ==
- Pedro Infante as Pepe "El Toro"
- Evita Muñoz "Chachita" as Chachita
- Amanda del Llano as Amalia
- Irma Dorantes as Lucha
- Freddy Fernández as Atita
- Fernando Soto "Mantequilla" as Antonio Feliciano de la Rosa
- Juan Orraca as Don Pancho, Coach
- Armando Velasco as Graduate
- Felipe Montoya as Delegate
- Elodia Hernández as Doña Rafaela
- Joaquín Cordero as Lalo Gallardo
- Wolf Ruvinskis as Bobby Galeana
- Pedro Elviro as Lawyer

== Accolades ==
=== Ariel Award ===
Year	Category	Nominee	Result	Ref.
1954	Best Director	Ismael Rodríguez	Nominated	
1954	Best Actor	Pedro Infante	Nominated	
1954	Best Editing	Fernando Martínez Álvarez	Nominated	
1954	Best Young Actor	Freddy Fernández	Nominated	
