= Cuando los hijos odian =

- Directed by: Joselito Rodríguez
- Written by: Carlos Orellana, Joselito Rodríguez
- Produced by: Alfonso Sánchez Tello
- Starring: Carlos Orellana; Amanda del Llano
- Cinematography: José Ortiz Ramos
- Edited by: Fernando Martínez
- Release date: 9 February 1950 (Mexico)
- Running time: 100 minutes
- Country: Mexico
- Language: Spanish

Cuando los hijos odian (When the Children Hate) is a 1950 Mexican film directed by Joselito Rodríguez and starring Carlos Orellana and Amanda del Llano.

== Cast ==
- Carlos Orellana - Tachito
- Amanda del Llano - Lolita
- Eduardo Noriega - José Luis Durán
- Fernando Soto "Mantequilla" - Stoperol, Ceferino Sánchez
- Delia Magaña - Nicolasa
- Miguel Inclán - Ramón González
- Gloria Iturbe - Mamá de José Luis
- Lupe Inclán - Doña Carmelita
- Alfonso Iglesias Padre - Compadre de Ramón
- Salvador Lozano - Doctor Aceves
- Antonio R. Frausto - Fortino
