= Beautiful Michoacán =

1943 film

- Directed by: Ismael Rodríguez
- Written by: Ernesto Cortázar; Álvaro Gálvez y Fuentes
- Starring: Tito Guízar; Gloria Marín; Víctor Manuel Mendoza
- Cinematography: José Ortiz Ramos
- Edited by: Jorge Busto
- Music by: Francisco Domínguez
- Production company: Producciones Rodríguez Hermanos
- Distributed by: Clasa Films Mundiales
- Release date: 1 January 1943
- Running time: 112 minutes
- Country: Mexico
- Language: Spanish

Beautiful Michoacán (Spanish: ¡Qué lindo es Michoacán!) is a 1943 Mexican musical comedy film directed by Ismael Rodríguez and starring Tito Guízar, Gloria Marín and Víctor Manuel Mendoza. It was shot at the Clasa Studios in Mexico City and on location around Michoacán. The film's sets were designed by the art director Ramón Rodríguez Granada.

== Synopsis ==
A wealthy woman travels to Michoacán where she has inherited an estate.

== Cast ==
- Tito Guízar as Ernesto
- Gloria Marín as Gloria Santibáñez
- Víctor Manuel Mendoza as Roque
- Evita Muñoz ("Chachita") as Chachita
- Dolores Camarillo as Nacha
- Jesús Graña as Evaristo
- Manuel Noriega as Padre Francisco
- Arturo Soto Rangel as Licenciado
- Carolina Barret as Julia
- Julio Ahuet as Valentín
- Ángel Garasa as Gastón
- Lupe del Castillo as Pianista
- Emma Duval as Nana

== Bibliography ==
- Ruth Hellier-Tinoco. Embodying Mexico: Tourism, Nationalism & Performance. Oxford University Press, 2011. ISBN 978-0-19-534036-5.
