= Los paquetes de Paquita =

- Directed by: Ismael Rodríguez
- Written by: Carlos Orellana; Ismael Rodríguez
- Produced by: Ismael Rodríguez
- Starring: Carlos Orellana; María Victoria
- Cinematography: Manuel Gómez Urquiza
- Edited by: Fernando Martínez
- Music by: Rosalío Ramírez
- Production company: Películas Rodríguez
- Release date: February 4, 1955
- Running time: 88 minutes
- Country: Mexico
- Language: Spanish

Los paquetes de Paquita ("The Packages of Paquita") is a 1955 Mexican film starring Carlos Orellana and María Victoria. It was followed by a sequel filmed the same year, Cupido pierde a Paquita.
