= The Priest's Secret =

1941 film by Joselito Rodríguez

- Directed by: Joselito Rodríguez
- Written by: Álvaro Gálvez y Fuentes; Luis Leal Solares; Ismael Rodríguez
- Starring: Arturo de Córdova; Alicia de Phillips; Pedro Armendáriz
- Cinematography: Alex Phillips
- Edited by: Jorge Bustos
- Music by: Nikolai Polanko
- Production company: Producciones Rodríguez Hermanos
- Release date: 22 January 1941
- Running time: 124 minutes
- Country: Mexico
- Language: Spanish

The Priest's Secret (Spanish: El secreto del sacerdote) is a 1941 Mexican drama film directed by Joselito Rodríguez and starring Arturo de Córdova, Alicia de Phillips and Pedro Armendáriz. A Catholic priest is conflicted about informing the police of something he heard in confession.

== Cast ==
- Arturo de Córdova
- Alicia de Phillips
- Pedro Armendáriz
- René Cardona
- Miguel Montemayor
- Víctor Urruchúa
- Manuel Noriega
- Evita Muñoz ("Chachita") as Martita
- Armando Soto La Marina
- Amelia Wilhelmy
- Joaquín Coss
- José Torvay
- Lupe Inclán
- Manuel Buendía
- Humberto Rodríguez

== Bibliography ==
- Daniel Biltereyst & Daniela Treveri Gennari. Moralizing Cinema: Film, Catholicism, and Power. Routledge, 2014.
