= Los tres huastecos =

1948 film

- Theatrical release poster
- Directed by: Ismael Rodríguez
- Written by: Rogelio A. González; Ismael Rodríguez
- Cinematography: Jorge Stahl Jr.
- Music by: Raúl Lavista
- Release date: 5 August 1948
- Running time: 120 minutes
- Country: Mexico
- Language: Spanish

Los tres huastecos ("The Three Huastecos") is a 1948 Mexican comedy-drama film directed by Ismael Rodríguez, and starring Pedro Infante, Blanca Estela Pavón and María Eugenia Llamas. This film marked the film debut of the actress and singer, Irma Dorantes.

== Plot ==
Three identical triplet brothers are raised separately in three villages in La Huasteca (a region in northeastern Mexico). Lorenzo, from Tamaulipas, is an atheistic bandolier; Juan de Dios, from San Luis Potosí, is a handsome priest; while Víctor, from Veracruz, is an army captain. Their great physical resemblance is a source of conflict. Juan de Dios tries to solve the problems with his two brothers. Mexican superstar Pedro Infante played three separate roles as each of these three individual triplets.

In the movie, the villain "El Coyote", whose identity is unknown, is killing and robbing the people in Lorenzo's village. His brother Víctor was transferred to the town to catch "El Coyote." Víctor also has a romantic interest in a village girl, Maritoña (Blanca Estela Pavon), who flirts with him at a party while Veracruz song "La Tuza" plays. Maritoña firmly rejects all of Victor's advances after the party.

María Eugenia Llamas, who was only four at the time, made her screen debut in this movie as "La Tucita", a stage name she has used ever since. She played the daughter of the saloon owning and atheist triplet, Lorenzo.

In Tucita's first appearance in the movie, she has a snake and a tarantula as pets, both of which she handles with love. She also pushes around her otherwise hardened father shamelessly. For instance, she shoots at him with a pistol and misses. Then, she starts crying. Her father asks her if she is crying because she got scared. Tucita tearfully responds that she is crying because she didn't kill him, which doesn't make him mad. In another scene, when she is in bed, she keeps pestering her father for one thing after another, to which he always complies, if visibly annoyed. Finally, she calls him in the next room that she is thirsty and demands a glass of water. When he grudgingly brings it, she waters her plant with it instead of drinking it, making him more frustrated but not angry with her.

Her father's stoic acceptance (while sometimes visibly annoyed) of everything Tucita does to him shows the movie audience that he has a soft spot and is not as thoroughly corrupt as he is otherwise portrayed in the first part of the movie. Nevertheless, Juan de Dios is interested in his niece's physical and spiritual welfare. He sometimes puts on a false mustache to disguise himself in the movie as his otherwise identical brother to look in on her, which works in fooling her. She can't figure out why her "father" is acting so differently.

Lorenzo is finally formally accused of being El Coyote. However, Víctor is the one who gets arrested and held in the village jail because, disguised as his brother, he is mistaken for Lorenzo. A mob tries to get to him in his cell to hang him. Lorenzo and Juan de Dios overcome the real Coyote (Alejandro Ciangherotti) while he is trying to kill them and get him to confess in writing that he is El Coyote. They place Tucita's pet tarantula on his chest, which scares the confession out of him. Tucita wags her finger at him and righteously tells him off. "Tan grandote y tan lloron (So big and such a baby.)

When presented to the authorities, that confession absolves Tucita's father and saves Víctor from the clutches of both the mob and the law. After all that, her father turns over a new leaf and takes Tucita to church for the first time. They kneel before the altar, and he lovingly shows her how to make the sign of the cross. As the movie ends, Víctor wins over the Maritoña while Juan de Dios and Lorenzo look on with great joy that all has turned out so well as their brother rides off with his lady love.

== Cast ==
- Pedro Infante as Juan de Dios Andrade/Lorenzo Andrade/Víctor Andrade
- Blanca Estela Pavón as Maritoña
- María Eugenia Llamas as Tucita
- Fernando Soto "Mantequilla" as Cuco
- Alejandro Ciangherotti as Alejandro
- Antonio R. Frausto as Don Damián
- Guillermo Calles as El Bronco
- Salvador Quiroz as Colonel
- Julio Ahuet as Captain
- Roberto Corell as Priest
- Chel López as Soldier
- Hernán Vera as Barman
- Irma Dorantes
- Andrés Huesca
- Leonor Gómez as Nana
