= Del rancho a la televisión =

1953 film by Ismael Rodríguez

- Directed by: Ismael Rodríguez
- Written by: Carlos Orellana
- Starring: Luis Aguilar
- Cinematography: Jack Draper
- Music by: Manuel Esperón
- Release date: 1953
- Running time: 100 minutes
- Country: Mexico
- Language: Spanish

Del rancho a la televisión ("From the Ranch to the Television") is a 1953 Mexican film. It stars Luis Aguilar.

== Plot ==
A young country boy moves to Mexico City to become a singer. A young girl and her father support him and help him on his road to fame. Unfortunately, his success is boycotted by a jealous woman.

== Cast ==
- Luis Aguilar
- Maria Victoria
- Chela Campos
- Carlos Orellana
- Andrés Soler
- Emma Rodriguez
