= Nosotros los Pobres =

Nosotros los pobres
- Film poster
- Directed by: Ismael Rodríguez
- Written by: Carlos González Dueñas; Ismael Rodríguez; Pedro de Urdimalas
- Produced by: Ismael Rodríguez
- Starring: Pedro Infante; Evita Muñoz "Chachita"
- Cinematography: José Ortiz Ramos
- Edited by: Fernando Martínez
- Music by: Manuel Esperón
- Release date: 25 March 1948
- Running time: 128 minutes
- Country: Mexico
- Language: Spanish

Nosotros los pobres ("We, the Poor") is a 1948 Mexican Drama film directed by Ismael Rodríguez, and starring Pedro Infante, Evita Muñoz "Chachita" and Blanca Estela Pavón. This film is the first part in a trilogy of movies, with Ustedes los ricos following in 1948 and Pepe el toro in 1953. All three were produced during the Golden Age of Mexican cinema.

Nosotros los pobres was originally titled Topillos y Planillas (named after two of the characters in the film and before the main character Jose "Pepe el Toro" was created), but later changed after its author Pedro de Urdimalas heard Abel Cureño (who's also in the film and at that time was playing a street vendor selling oranges in the radio show La Banda de Huipanguillo) commenting (in character) about the unfair treatment of the poor people in the city exclaimed: "Nosotros los pobres somos despreciados por la gente; Nosotros los pobres no tenemos nada" ("We the poor are outcast by society; We the poor own nothing"). Although it won no prizes, it remained for many years Mexico's all-time leader in box-office receipts and is often shown on television.

== Plot ==
Pepe el Toro (the bull), a carpenter, lives with his adopted daughter Chachita in a poor neighbourhood in Mexico City. Chachita asks Pepe to promise that he would not date or marry anyone, to honor her beloved mother. Pepe, tries to woo Celia, who lives nearby, without Chachita finding out, but Celia's abusive stepfather Don Pilar disapproves of their romance and tries to prevent it.

On Day of the Dead, Chachita and Celia go to visit Chachita's mother's tomb at the cemetery, but a woman reveals to them that the tomb really belongs to her daughter. Chachita, heartbroken, goes home to confront Pepe, but he refuses to reveal where her mother's tomb is located. Chachita storms out of the room and Celia tries to get the truth from him. Pepe tells Celia that he can't say. Celia tells him that she thinks what the town has been saying about him must be true: that Pepe killed Chachita's mother. Chachita sees them kissing, which then worsens the situation.

On Chachita's birthday, the townspeople encourage Pepe to serenade to Chachita for her birthday, Pepe and the others sing Las Mañanitas and Chachita finally comes to the window, and everyone goes in Pepe's home to celebrate. Celia attempts to give Chachita a gift, but Chachita refuses it and goes outside. Celia tries to reconcile with Chachita, but it doesn't go well. Pepe goes outside to talk to the both of them but sees Yolanda, Chachita's mother, waiting to talk to him. He quickly ushers Yolanda out of sight where she tells him she is going away, but both Celia and Chachita see Pepe with Yolanda. Celia gets extremely jealous and confronts him, Chachita is upset. Pepe sends Chachita home and tries to talk to Celia, then he finally agrees to tell her the truth, that Yolanda is in fact his sister, but says if he tells her that it is over between them, breaking her heart.

At the party, Pepe's friends are arrested for accidentally stealing the food. Montes comes back and gives Pepe $400 so he can buy the wood for the table, and Pepe gives the money to Chachita so she can hide it until he comes back with the wood. As Chachita is hiding the cash, Don Pilar sees her. A few minutes later, Don Pilar enters and steals the money, but Pepe's paraplegic mom sees him, he notices this but ignores her.

Montes sees Celia, he becomes infatuated and offers her a secretarial job, and tries to give her his business card but she refuses to take it, he tosses his business card on the ground. Yolanda sees Celia picking the card up, tears up the card and warns Celia that Montes is not worth the trouble.

Pepe begins to work for Doña Merneciana, a rich woman, to earn the money he needs to repay Montes for the table. Meanwhile a gang led by Ledo, offers him a job helping on a robbery at Merenciana's house but he refuses the offer. That night, Pepe finds Merenciana's dead body and he is blamed for the murder. Montes manages to send him to jail since he is unable to recover his money.

For a few days, Chachita and Celia unsuccessfully try to visit Pepe in jail, because he constantly gets in trouble fighting the other inmates. Celia decides to break with Pepe and stay with Montes so she can earn some money in order to get Pepe out of jail. After Montes and Celia have sex, she feels guilty and runs away to never see Montes again.

Chachita and Pepe's mom are kicked out of their house and the carpentry is closed. Don Pilar and Celia let them stay at their home. However, Don Pilar turns mad since he begins to feel guilty of his actions, and brutally beats Pepe's mother. At jail Pepe hears that his mom is sent to the hospital and breaks out, while at the hospital Chachita begs to the doctor to attend her grandma, but finds out that he is attending a dying Yolanda, she pleads to the Doctor to kill Yolanda and save her grandma instead. Pepe arrives and tells Chachita that Yolanda is her biological mother, both Chachita and Yolanda break down in tears and bid their farewells. Pepe does the same with his mom before turning himself into the authorities.

Back in jail, Pepe encounters Ledo and his gang, he manages to take them to a closed cell, where Pepe manages to defeat the gang and pops Ledo's eye out, then he forces him to confess the truth by screaming "Pepe el Toro is not guilty!"

A few months later, Pepe reunites with Chachita and Celia, with whom he has married and had a baby boy, Emilio Giron, called "El Torito". They go to the cemetery to visit the graves of Pepe's mom and sister, there Chachita encounters the woman again who and asks her "did you mistake the tomb again?" to which Chachita replies: "No, now I have a tomb to cry for".

== Cast ==
- Pedro Infante as José del Toro, 'Pepe el toro' (Pepe the Bull)
- Evita Muñoz "Chachita" as Chachita
- Carmen Montejo as Yolanda, la Tísica (the Tuberculous)
- Blanca Estela Pavón as Celia 'La Romántica' (the Romantic)
- Miguel Inclán as Don Pilar
- Rafael Alcayde as Lawyer Montes
- Katy Jurado as La que se levanta tarde (the one who wakes up late)
- María Gentil Arcos as La Paralítica (the Paralytic)
- Delia Magaña as La Tostada
- Amelia Wilhelmi as Malena, la Guayaba
- Pedro de Urdimalas as Topillos
- Ricardo Camacho as Planillas
- Lucila Franco as Doña Merenciana
- Jorge Arriaga as Ledo
- Abel Asencio as Pinocho
- Jesús García as El Camello, lottery vendor
- Conchita Gentil Arcos as Money lender
- Julio Ahuet as Prisoner

== Trilogy ==
The film was followed by two sequels, Ustedes los ricos (You the Rich) in 1948 and Pepe the Bull (Pepe el toro) in 1953. Rodríguez directed all three films, with Infante and Muñóz returning for both sequels, while Pavón only reprised her character in Ustedes los ricos, as she died in a plane crash in 1949.
