= Borrasca en las almas =

- Directed by: Ismael Rodríguez
- Written by: Carlos Orellana (adaptation), Luis G. Basurto (play)
- Starring: Carlos Orellana, María Elena Marqués, Roberto Cañedo and Gustavo Rojo
- Release date: 24 June 1954 (Mexico)
- Running time: 104 min
- Country: Mexico
- Language: Spanish

Borrasca en las almas (English: Storm in the Soul) is a 1954 Mexican film. It stars Carlos Orellana.

== Cast ==
- María Elena Marqués
- Roberto Cañedo
- Gustavo Rojo
- Carlos Orellana
- Emma Roldán
- Salvador Quiroz
- Carlos Riquelme
- José Luis Aguirre 'Trotsky'
- Eulalio González
- Lidia Franco
- Manuel de la Vega
- Dolores Tinoco
