= Every Madman to His Specialty =

1939 film

- Directed by: Juan Bustillo Oro
- Written by: Juan Bustillo Oro; Humberto Gómez Landero
- Produced by: Jesús Grovas; Juan Bustillo Oro
- Starring: Enrique Herrera; Joaquín Pardavé; Gloria Marín
- Cinematography: Jack Draper
- Edited by: Mario González
- Music by: Max Urban
- Production company: Grovas-Oro Films
- Release date: 15 March 1939
- Running time: 123 minutes
- Country: Mexico
- Language: Spanish

Every Madman to His Specialty (Spanish: Cada loco con su tema) is a 1939 Mexican comedy mystery film directed by Juan Bustillo Oro and starring Enrique Herrera, Joaquín Pardavé and Gloria Marín. It was shot at the Clasa Studios in Mexico City. The film's sets were designed by the art director Carlos Toussaint.

== Cast ==
- Enrique Herrera as Julio César Napoleón
- Joaquín Pardavé as Justiniano conquián
- Gloria Marín as Josefina Larios Conquián
- Antonio R. Frausto as Serafin del Monte
- Alberto Martí as Dr. Germán Casca Conquián
- Natalia Ortiz as Augusta
- Eduardo Arozamena as Severo - Cedronio Conquián
- Adela Jaloma as Lucrecia
- Francisco Jambrina as Arturo Íñigo
- Alberto Galán as Dr. Luis Jiménez
- Wilfrido Moreno as Pedro
- Roberto Banquells as Anselmo Cordero Conquián
- Victoria Argota as Etelvina
- Elvira Gosti as Clarita
- Humberto Rodríguez as Policía
- Honorato Bassoco as Policía
- Gerardo del Castillo as Director sanatorio
- Crox Alvarado as Secretario de notario
- Aurora Ruiz as Sirvienta

== Bibliography ==
- Amador, María Luisa. Cartelera cinematográfica, 1930-1939. Filmoteca, UNAM, 1980.
- Brill, Olaf (ed.) Expressionism in the Cinema. Edinburgh University Press, 2016.
- Richard, Alfred. Censorship and Hollywood's Hispanic image: an interpretive filmography, 1936-1955. Greenwood Press, 1993.
