= Crimen en la alcoba =

- Directed by: Emilio Gómez Muriel
- Written by: Jesús Cárdenas; Emilio Gómez Muriel; Rafael Solana
- Starring: Carlos Orellana
- Cinematography: Raúl Martínez Solares
- Edited by: Jorge Busto
- Release date: 1946
- Country: Mexico
- Language: Spanish

Crimen en la alcoba ("Crime in the Bedroom") is a 1946 Mexican film. It stars Carlos Orellana.
