= My General's Women =

- Directed by: Ismael Rodríguez
- Written by: Joselito Rodríguez; Celestino Gorostiza; Ismael Rodríguez; Pedro de Urdimalas
- Starring: Pedro Infante; Lilia Prado; Chula Prieto
- Cinematography: José Ortiz Ramos
- Edited by: Fernando Martínez
- Production company: Producciones Rodríguez Hermanos
- Release date: 13 July 1951
- Running time: 112 minutes
- Country: Mexico
- Language: Spanish

My General's Women (Spanish: Las mujeres de mi general) is a 1951 Mexican drama film directed by Ismael Rodríguez and starring Pedro Infante, Lilia Prado and Chula Prieto.

The film's sets were designed by the art director José Rodríguez Granada.

== Cast ==
- Pedro Infante as General Juan Zepeda
- Lilia Prado as Lupe
- Chula Prieto as Carlota
- Miguel Manzano as Coronel Domingo Vargas
- Miguel Inclán as Blas
- Arturo Soto Rangel as Don Jelipe
- Lupe Inclán as Tacha
- Alberto Catalá as Marco Polo
- Miguel Ángel López as Romulito
- Pedro de Urdimalas as Salas
- Ángel Infante as Sarmiento, el traidor
- Jorge Mondragon as Fermín Mendoza
- Luis Aragón as Soldado
- Daniel Arroyo as Invitado al baile
- Guillermo Bravo Sosa as Invitado al baile
- José Chávez as Sargento
- Roberto Corell as Alcalde
- Guillermo Cramer as Invitado al baile
- Pedro Elviro as Invitado al baile
- Rogelio Fernández as Soldado
- Jesús Garcia as Notario
- Leonor Gómez as Pueblerina
- Cecilia Leger as Invitada al baile
- Elvira Lodi
- Chel López
- Concepción Martínez as Invitada al baile
- Héctor Mateos as Hacendado, invitado al baile
- José Muñoz as Soldado
- Francisco Pando as Invitado al baile
- Salvador Quiroz as Militar
- Joaquín Roche as Militar
- María Luisa Smith as Invitada al baile
- María Valdealde as Invitada al baile gruñóna
- Domingo Vargas

== Bibliography ==
- Juanita Heredia. Transnational Latina Narratives in the Twenty-first Century. Palgrave Macmillan, 2009.
