= The Three Garcias =

1947 film

- Directed by: Ismael Rodríguez
- Written by: Rogelio A. González; Fernando Méndez; Carlos Orellana; Ismael Rodríguez; Pedro de Urdimalas; Elvira de la Mora
- Produced by: Ismael Rodríguez
- Starring: Pedro Infante; Sara García; Abel Salazar; Marga López
- Cinematography: Ross Fisher
- Edited by: Rafael Portillo
- Music by: Manuel Esperón
- Production company: Producciones Rodríguez Hermanos
- Distributed by: Clasa-Mohme
- Release date: 15 August 1947
- Running time: 118 minutes
- Country: Mexico
- Language: Spanish

The Three Garcias (Spanish: Los tres García) is a 1947 Mexican comedy film by Ismael Rodríguez and starring Pedro Infante, Sara García, Abel Salazar and Marga López. It was shot at the Tepeyac Studios in Mexico City. The film's sets were designed by the art director Carlos Toussaint. A sequel The Garcias Return was released a few months later the same year.

For the film's exterior shots, the Delegation or City of Cuajimalpa (within modern Mexico City), was used, specially Parroquia San Pedro Apostol, which still provides religious services. Pedro Infante fell in love with the town, the locals and countryside, to the point of building a large mansion just outside Cuajimalpa. He lived there until his death in 1957. The house stood there until the 1990s; it was later demolished and Husky Injection Molding Systems Mexico was constructed on the same site. The northwest exterior wall that surrounded Pedro's property still stands to this day.

== Cast ==
- Pedro Infante as Luis Antonio García
- Sara García as Grandma Luisa García
- Marga López as Lupita Smith García
- Abel Salazar as José Luis García
- Víctor Manuel Mendoza as Luis Manuel García
- Carlos Orellana as Priest
- Fernando Soto "Mantequilla" as Tranquilino
- Antonio R. Frausto as Mayor Don Cosme
- Clifford Carr as Mr. John Smith
- Manuel Arvide as Juez calificador
- Luis Enrique Cubillan as Hermano López
- José Muñoz as Juan López
- Manuel Roche as Simón López
- Paco Martínez as Don Julián
- Queta Lavat as Invitada fiesta

== Bibliography ==
- Day, Stuart A. Modern Mexican Culture: Critical Foundations. University of Arizona Press, 2017.
- Egan, Linda & Long, Mary K. (ed.) Mexico Reading the United States. Vanderbilt University Press, 2009.
