= Chela Campos =

Mexican singer and actress

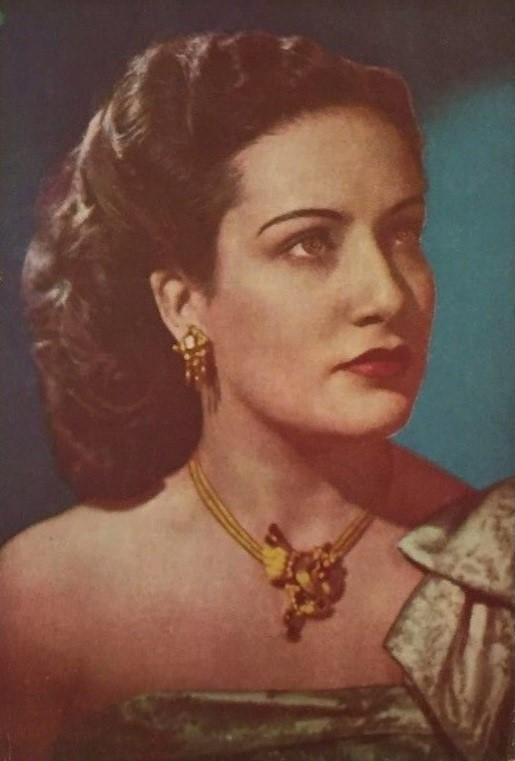
- Chela Campos in 1950

Background information
- Born: Celia Campos Díaz; 6 October 1922; Mexico City, Mexico
- Died: 18 June 1982 (aged 59) Mexico City, Mexico
- Genres: Bolero
- Occupations: Singer; actress
- Instrument: Vocals
- Years active: 1940–1982
- Labels: RCA Víctor; Orfeón

Celia Campos Díaz (6 October 1922 – 18 June 1982), known as Chela Campos, was a Mexican singer and actress.

== Career ==
Campos was a beautiful woman gifted with a sensual voice. Campos rose to fame in the 1940s as a successful bolero performer.

Campos made her radio debut at the XEFO station and later won a contract to sing on the XEW station, where she was known as "La Dama del Bastón de Cristal" (The Lady of the Crystal Cane) for the elegant cane she used. She became one of Mexico's most important bolero singers and also achieved great popularity in Cuba. Her hit singles were released by RCA Víctor Records, and she also recorded a studio album with Orfeón Records.

Campos ventured into acting in films such as La isla de la pasión (1942), La mujer sin alma (1944), and Del rancho a la televisión (1953).

Campos remained active as a singer until 1982.

== Personal life ==
On 06/18/1982, Campos died after a short illness in Mexico City, Mexico. She was 59 years old and was born 10/06/1922.

== Discography ==
=== Singles ===
- "Déjame soñarte" (1941)
- "Altivez" (1941)
- "No volveré a sonreír" (1941)
- "Cuando vuelvan las golondrinas" (1941)
- "Triste recuerdo" (1942)
- "Venganza" (1942)
- "Bésame mucho" (1942)
- "Eclipse" (1943)
- "¿Qué es lo que pasa?" (1944)
- "Hay que vivir el momento" (1945)
- "Arrullos de mar" (1946)
- "Vivir para soñar" (1946)
- "Me dijeron ayer" (1947)
- "Cobardía" (1947)

=== Studio albums ===
- Cosas del ayer (Orfeón, 1965)

=== Compilation albums ===
- Chela Campos (De Colección, 1990)

== Filmography ==
- 1942 Virgen de medianoche
- 1952 Del Rancho a la Television, with Luis Aguilar and Maria Victoria.
