= El hotel de los chiflados =

- Starring: Carlos Orellana
- Release date: 1938
- Country: Mexico
- Language: Spanish

El hotel de los chiflados ("The Hotel of the Stooges") is a 1938 Mexican film. It stars Carlos Orellana.
