= The Sin of a Mother =

- Directed by: Ramón Pereda
- Starring: Adriana Lamar; Ramón Pereda; Carlos Orellana
- Release date: 1944
- Country: Mexico
- Language: Spanish

The Sin of a Mother (Spanish: El pecado de una madre) is a 1944 Mexican film. It stars Adriana Lamar, Ramón Pereda and Carlos Orellana.
