= Narciso's Hard Luck =

- Directed by: Enrique Herrera
- Written by: Enrique Herrera
- Produced by: Archibaldo Burns; Enrique Herrera
- Starring: Enrique Herrera; Gloria Marín
- Cinematography: Ross Fisher
- Edited by: José W. Bustos
- Music by: Armando Rosales
- Release date: 19 July 1940
- Running time: 66 minute
- Country: Mexico
- Language: Spanish

Narciso's Hard Luck (Spanish: Los apuros de Narciso) is a 1940 Mexican comedy film directed by Enrique Herrera, who also stars along with Gloria Marín. The film's sets were designed by Mariano Rodríguez Granada.

== Cast ==
- Daniel Arroyo
- Carolina Barret
- Roberto Corell
- Joaquín Coss
- Gerardo del Castillo
- Pilar Fernandez
- Carlos Font
- Antonio R. Frausto
- Gilberto González
- Enrique Herrera
- Alba del Mar
- Gloria Marín
- Lili Marín
- Wilfrido Moreno
- Roberto Y. Palacios
- Matilde Palou
- Emilio Romero
- Conchita Saenz
- Emma Telmo
- Alfonso Torres
- Víctor Torres

== Bibliography ==
- Paulo Antonio Paranaguá. Mexican Cinema. British Film Institute, 1995.
