= Ustedes los ricos =

- Directed by: Ismael Rodríguez
- Written by: Carlos González Dueñas; Rogelio A. González; Ismael Rodríguez; Pedro de Urdimalas
- Starring: Pedro Infante; Evita Muñoz "Chachita"; Blanca Estela Pavón
- Cinematography: José Ortiz Ramos
- Edited by: Fernando Martínez
- Music by: Manuel Esperón
- Release date: 1948
- Running time: 130 minutes
- Country: Mexico
- Language: Spanish

Ustedes los ricos (You the Rich) is a 1948 Mexican drama film directed by Ismael Rodríguez and starring Pedro Infante, Evita Muñoz "Chachita" and Blanca Estela Pavón. This film is the second part in a trilogy produced during the Golden Age of Mexican cinema, starting with Nosotros los Pobres (We the Poor) earlier in 1948 and followed by Pepe the Bull (Pepe, el toro) in 1953. Ismael Rodríguez directed all three films, with Pedro Infante as Pepe the Bull and Evita Muñoz "Chachita" as his daughter Chachita, while Blanca Estela Pavón only appeared as Celia in the first two, as she died in a plane crash in 1949.

== Plot ==
Pepe el Toro, a poor carpenter, almost gets hit by a car. He begins fighting with passenger that turns out to be Manuel de la Colina y Barcega, the real father of her adoptive daughter Chachita. Revealed that, he and his mother, Doña Charito goes to Pepe's neighborhood in order to talk with her and offer her a better life by taking her away from poverty. However, she is undecided as long as she befriends a silly but loyal boy called El Pichi (The Silly) and she is not getting along about the judgment of their newfound family against her current poor family.

Pepe begins to take distance from his family as long as he has to do some part-time jobs and found an old friend from jail, that began to get closer to him without knowing that he is also a partner from Ledo El Tuerto (The One-Eyed), a delinquent that lost an eye fighting Pepe before and he is looking for revenge.

This provokes Chachita to leave her family and joins the family of her birth father, but she decides to come back home to the surprise of his family when she feels out of the place. Meanwhile, El Camello (The Camel), a hunchback lottery vendor learns that Lido is free, but he is discovered by Lido's henchmen and they throw him onto the tramway rails at the moment the tramway passes, losing his legs in the process. Pepe and his friends are able to find him but he is too weak to say anything before dying.

The vicinity brings El Camello to be buried, but while this is happening, more tragedies are around as long as Lido and his gang sets a fire on Pepe's Carpentry where Chachita and El Torito, Pepe and Delia son, are inside. Manuel is on the place to talk with Chachita and manages to save her but he dies in the process. El Torito is horribly burned to death even with the best efforts of his father to save him.

Some days later, Chachita goes to her grandmother home to find her alone, as long as she found that no one really loved Manuel and they went after their money, losing also his butler in the process. But Chachita is not there to console her, but to get some help as long as Pepe, disconsolate over Torito's fate, stays all day and all night crying over his body remembering the good times with him. Finally Delia convinces him to leave his son to her so she can cry with thim.

Just in this moment, his friend from the jail reveals that Lido was behind the fire and guides him to a trap in the top of the Energy Company building where Pepe has to confront Lido and his henchmen. Lido tries to shoot Pepe but he only manages to hit him in the ear, then the fist fight begins to turn against Pepe, but he manages to push one of the henchmen into a high voltage room killing him, then Lido and his partner closes Pepe to the edge of the roof hanging in one hand, but then Pepe manages to pull both Lido and his partner to fall to their death.

Some time later, a party is done where Pepe and La Chorreada celebrates their new born kid along with the vicinity, then Doña Charito joins the party and wants to live with them in order to learn more about love being more important than money.

== Reception ==
Grace Kingsley of Los Angeles Times wrote "The story's bare recital could not give any idea of the really powerful melodrama nor of the vivid characterization and the many excellent: bits of comedy which embellish it."
