= El crucifijo de piedra =

- Directed by: Carlos Toussaint
- Written by: Mario García Camberos (story), Paulino Masip (screenplay)
- Produced by: Alfonso Rosas Priego
- Starring: Sara García, Rosa Elena Durgel, Fernando Casanova
- Cinematography: Ezequiel Carrasco
- Edited by: Alfredo Rosas Priego
- Music by: Antonio Díaz Conde, Miguel Ángel Pazos
- Release date: 15 June 1956
- Running time: 80 minutes
- Country: Mexico
- Language: Spanish

El crucifijo de piedra ("The Crucifix of Stone") is a 1956 Mexican film. It stars Sara García.
