= The Cha Cha Cha Widows =

Las Viudas del Cha Cha Cha
- Directed by: Miguel M. Delgado
- Written by: Fernando Galiana
- Screenplay by: Miguel M. Delgado
- Story by: Ramón Pérez Peláez
- Produced by: Alberto Galindo
- Starring: Amalia Aguilar; Raúl Martínez; Chula Prieto
- Cinematography: Rosalío Solano
- Edited by: José W. Bustos
- Music by: José de la Vega
- Production company: Filmadora Chapultepec
- Release date: 15 September 1955 (Mexico)
- Running time: 85 min
- Country: Mexico
- Language: Spanish

Las viudas del cha-cha-cha (English: The Cha Cha Cha Widows) is a 1955 Mexican Musical Comedy directed by Miguel M. Delgado and starring Amalia Aguilar, Raúl Martínez and Chula Prieto.

== Cast ==
- Amalia Aguilar
- Raúl Martínez
- Chula Prieto
- Andrés Soler
- Eduardo Alcaraz
- León Barroso
- María Herrero
- Otilia Larrañaga
