= Huapango (film) =

1938 film

- Directed by: Juan Bustillo Oro
- Written by: Juan Bustillo Oro; Humberto Gómez Landero
- Produced by: Salvador Bueno; Juan Bustillo Oro
- Starring: Gloria Morel; Enrique Herrera; Antonio R. Frausto
- Cinematography: Agustín Jiménez
- Edited by: Juan Bustillo Oro; Aniceto Ortega
- Music by: Manuel Castro Padilla
- Production company: Oro Films
- Distributed by: Cinexport Distributing
- Release date: 30 March 1938
- Running time: 85 minutes
- Country: Mexico
- Language: Spanish

Huapango is a 1938 Mexican musical comedy film directed by Juan Bustillo Oro and starring Gloria Morel, Enrique Herrera and Antonio R. Frausto. The film's sets were designed by the art director Ramón Rodríguez Granada. Location shooting took place around Tlacotalpan and elsewhere in the state of Veracruz.

== Cast ==
- Gloria Morel as Aurora
- Enrique Herrera as Refugio Ramírez Ramos
- Juan José Martínez Casado as Ramón Fernández
- Antonio R. Frausto as Juancho el sordo
- Dolores Camarillo as La criada Refugio
- Manuel Noriega as Don Anselmo
- Miguel Wimer as Don Ramiro
- Salvador Quiroz as Don Chico
- Galo Barcelata as El cantador
- Humberto Rodríguez as Juan Valiente
- Conchita Sáenz as La cocinera
- Hernán Vera as Roque
- José Ignacio Rocha as Lencho
- José Eduardo Pérez as Médico
- José Torvay as Autoridad

== Bibliography ==
- Amador, María Luisa. Cartelera cinematográfica, 1930-1939. Filmoteca, UNAM, 1980.
- Gunckel, Colin, Horak, Jan-Christopher & Jarvinen, Lisa. Cinema Between Latin America and Los Angeles: Origins to 1960. Rutgers University Press, 2019.
