= The Blacksmith (1944 film) =

El herrero
- Starring: Carlos Orellana
- Release date: 1944
- Country: Mexico
- Language: Spanish

El herrero ("The Blacksmith") is a 1944 Mexican drama film. It stars Carlos Orellana.
