= Mujeres y toros =

- Starring: Carlos Orellana
- Release date: 1939
- Country: Mexico
- Language: Spanish

Mujeres y toros ("Women and Bulls") is a 1939 Mexican film. It stars Carlos Orellana.
