= Chula Prieto =

Mexican actress

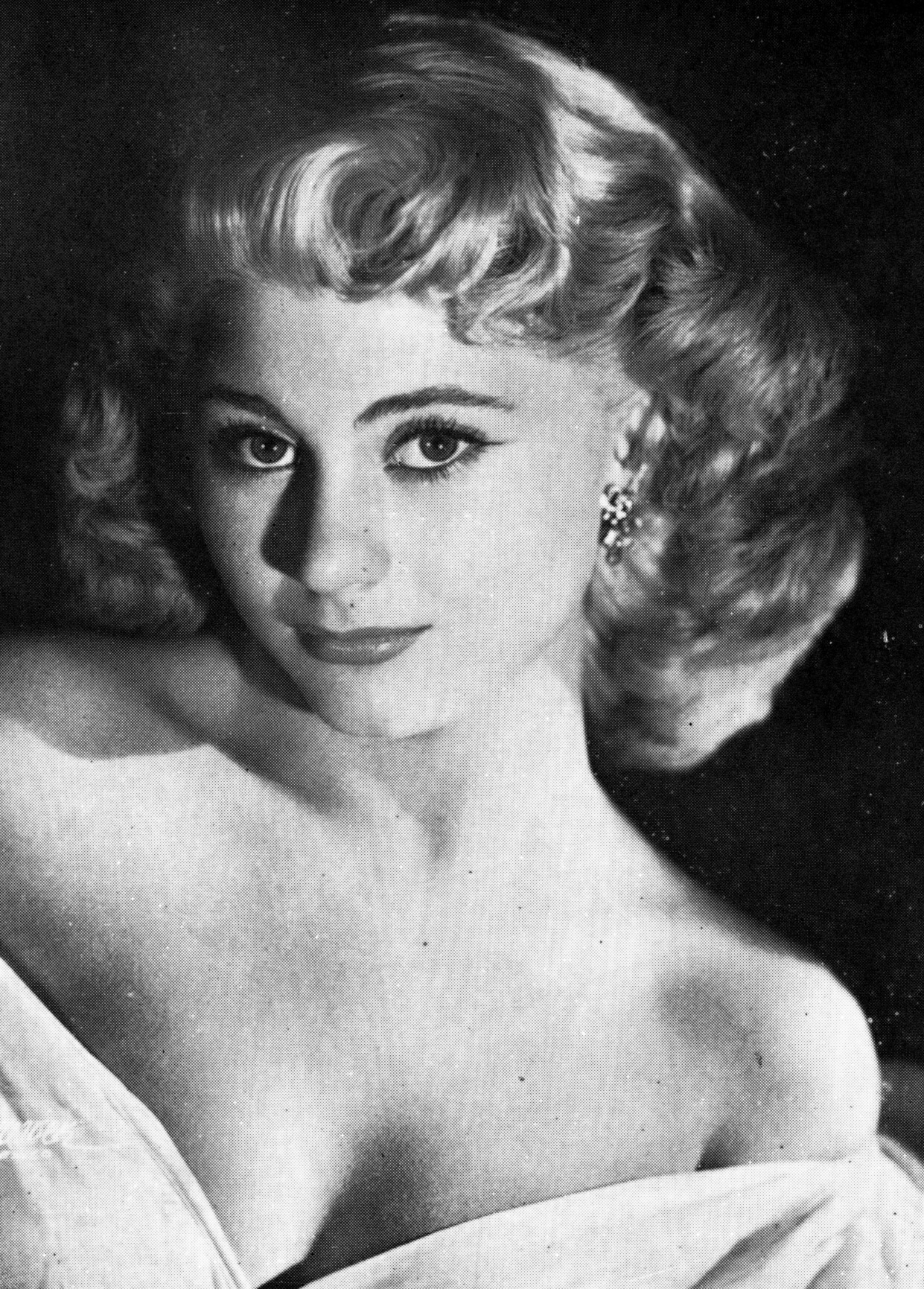
- Chula Prieto in 1954
- Born: 1929; Mexico
- Died: 1960 (aged 30–31); Mexico
- Other name: María del Carmen Prieto Salido
- Occupation: Actress
- Years active: 1947-1958 (film)

Chula Prieto (1929–1960) was a Mexican film actress.

== Selected filmography ==
- My General's Women (1951)
- You Had To Be a Gypsy (1953)
- Your Memory and Me (1953)
- The Plebeian (1953)
- The Cha Cha Cha Widows (1955)

== Bibliography ==
- Rogelio Agrasánchez. Beauties of Mexican Cinema. Agrasanchez Film Archive, 2001.
