= El colmillo de Buda =

- Produced by: Fernando de Fuentes
- Release date: 1949
- Country: Mexico
- Language: Spanish

El colmillo de Buda ("The Tooth of Buddha") is a 1949 Mexican film. It was produced by Fernando de Fuentes. It is based on a play by Pedro Muñoz Seca.
