= The Garcias Return =

1947 film

- Directed by: Ismael Rodríguez
- Written by: Rogelio A. González; Carlos González Dueñas; Carlos Orellana; Ismael Rodríguez; Pedro de Urdimalas
- Produced by: Ismael Rodríguez
- Starring: Pedro Infante; Sara García; Abel Salazar; Marga López
- Cinematography: Ross Fisher
- Edited by: Rafael Portillo
- Music by: Rosalío Ramírez
- Production company: Producciones Rodríguez Hermanos
- Distributed by: Clasa-Mohme
- Release date: 17 November 1947
- Running time: 113 minutes
- Country: Mexico
- Language: Spanish

The Garcias Return (Spanish: ¡Vuelven los García!) is a 1947 Mexican comedy drama film directed by Ismael Rodríguez and starring Pedro Infante, Sara García, Abel Salazar and Marga López. It was shot at the Tepeyac Studios in Mexico City. The film's sets were designed by the art director Carlos Toussaint. It is a sequel to the film The Three Garcias, released earlier the same year.

== Synopsis ==
Luis Antonio, Jose Luis and Luis Manuel are back and seemingly at ease with each other. However, destiny has something in store for them: the spawn of one of the evil Lopezes, siblings Leon and Juan Simon, are looking for vengeance.

== Cast ==
- Sara García as Doña Luisa García
- Pedro Infante as Luis Antonio García
- Abel Salazar as José Luis García
- Víctor Manuel Mendoza as Luis Manuel García
- Marga López as Lupita
- Carlos Orellana as Señor cura
- Clifford Carr as Mr. John Smith
- Fernando Soto "Mantequilla" as Tranquilino
- Antonio R. Frausto as Don Cosme, presidente municipal
- Manuel Arvide as Juez calificador
- Rogelio A. González as León López
- Blanca Estela Pavón as Juan Simón López

== Bibliography ==
- Egan, Linda & Long, Mary K. (ed.) Mexico Reading the United States. Vanderbilt University Press, 2009.
- Mora, Carl J. Mexican Cinema: Reflections of a Society, 1896-2004. McFarland, 2005.
