= María Eugenia Llamas =

Mexican actress

- Llamas, Pedro Infante, and Sara García
- Born: María Eugenia Llamas Andresco; 19 February 1944; Mexico City, Mexico
- Died: August 31, 2014 (aged 70); Guadalajara, Jalisco, Mexico
- Other name: La Tucita
- Occupations: Acting; onstage story telling
- Years active: 1948-2007
- Spouse: Rómulo Lozano (m. 1966; died 1996)
- Children: 3

María Eugenia Llamas Andresco (19 February 1944 – 31 August 2014) was a Mexican actress best known for her roles as "La Tucita" in the Golden Age of Mexican cinema in the late 1940s and in the 1950s. She began appearing in these films in 1948 at the age of four. She was the winner of the Mexican equivalent of the Oscar, the Premio Ariel. While she appeared in many movies after her childhood, she is less known for them. However, she remained popular for her radio and television appearances, for her on-stage story telling talent, and as a live theater actress, and was the 2007 recipient of the Diploma Medalla al Mérito (Medal of Merit) award from the Spanish American Itinerate Academy of Itinerate Oral Narration.

== Introduction ==
Llamas was born in 1944 in Mexico City. There is little published about her parents. Her father, José Maria Llamas Olaran, was Basque, and hailed from the Rioja region in Spain. Her mother, María Dolores Andresco Kuraitis, was born in Paris, France, to a Ukrainian Jewish father and a Lithuanian Roman Catholic mother. They immigrated to Mexico from Spain in 1939 as refugees from the Spanish Civil War and remained advocates of the lost Republican side of that war.

== Los Tres Huastecos (The Three Men from Huasteca) ==
María Eugenia Llamas made her film debut in 1948 during the Golden Age of Mexican cinema in memorable child roles. Llamas was selected for her screen debut when she was only three, at which age first met Pedro Infante, who is still known among his many fans as "The Idol (El Idolo)". When Llamas was only four years old, she co-starred with him as "La Tucita" in the 1948 classic film Los Tres Huastecos (The Three Men from Huasteca). In LLamas' screen debut, her feisty acting style stole scene after scene from no less than the "idol", Pedro Infante himself.

=== Dicen que Soy Mujeriego (They Say I am a Womanizer) ===
Her next movie role, also as Tucita, was in the 1949 classic film Dicen que Soy un Mujeriego (They Say I am a Womanizer). In this film, Llamas co-starred again with Infante. In this comedy, Pedro Infante plays the philandering grandson of "Doña Rosa", a prominent rancher. Doña Rosa is constantly trying to get her grandson to behave properly – without success.

=== Premio Ariel (Mexican Oscar) ===
María Eugenia Llamas was nominated for the Premio Ariel Mexicano (the Mexican equivalent of the Oscar) for her role, but did not win. María Eugenia Llamas did finally win the Ariel Award in 1952 for her role in the 1950 film, Los Niños Miran al Cielo (The Children Look to Heaven). Llamas went on to make many more movies, both as a child and as an adult.

Llamas and Pedro Infante maintained a cordial relationship for the following ten years, until his untimely death on 15 April 1957. Pedro Infante was an avid pilot. He was piloting his own multiengine plane to Mexico City, when it crashed shortly after takeoff from Mérida, Yucatán causing his death, along with the deaths of his co-pilot and the engineer.

== Later life ==
In the 1980s, Llamas served as the Cultural Director of Mexican Social Security (IMSS or Instituto Mexicano del Seguro Social). In 1987, Cuban-born author Francisco Garzón Céspedes persuaded her to take up public story telling, which she started and continued to do until late in life, even after her acting career ended.

Through her on-stage story telling, she became and remains active in the promotion of Mexican culture. She was the 2007 recipient of the prestigious Diploma Medalla al Mérito (Medal of Merit) for her 60 years of creative and successful artistic and cultural achievement. This award comes from the Spanish-American Academy of Itinerate Oral Narration, headquartered in Mexico City and Madrid, and which was founded by Garzón Céspedes.

=== Family ===
Her late sister María Victoria "Mariví" Llamas was a well-known author and telejournalist in Mexico City, who often wrote on feminist topics. She won the Premio Nacional de Periodismo three times and authored five books. Most notable was her collection of short stories entitled "Que Le Cuento (What Can I Tell You)". She also starred in many Spanish-language movies. She appeared in the movies Un Divorcio (A Divorce; 1953), Menores de Edad (Under Aged; 1951), Angelitos Negros (Little Black Angels; 1948), Ya Tengo a Mi Hijo (Now I Hold My Son; 1948). Mariví Llamas died in Mexico City on 5 January 2007, aged 67, from Hepatitis C and liver cancer. Their half brother, José Ángel Llamas, is a retired television actor.

== Last years ==
Llamas lived in Monterrey, Mexico, where she married Rómulo Lozano in 1966, who was a popular announcer and actor in Mexico. Lozano was the emcee and comedian of a variety/talent show called Mira Que Bonito (Look How Nice) for almost 30 years. Lozano also appeared in several movies in the 1980s. Lozano died on 26 January 1996 in Monterrey of heart disease. Llamas has children and grandchildren and described her family as the true success story of her life. Her son, José Fernando Lozano Llamas, aka Fernando Lozano, is an actor and host of TV Azteca's Venga la Alegria. Fernando Lozano appeared on the stage in Defending the Caveman, and with his mother in the theatrical comedy Si Te Casas Te Aplasto (If You Get Married, I Will Crush You). She also had two daughters, Luz Maria Lozano Llamas and María Eugenia Lozano Llamas.

== Death ==
Llamas died at the age of 70 on 31 August 2014 in Guadalajara, Jalisco, from cardiac arrest while visiting her daughter.

== Filmography ==
- Más Allá de Mí/Farther From Me (2008). La Tucita
- El Criminal ... aka El Gatillo de la Muerte (The Criminal aka The Trigger of Death) (USA) (1985)
- Cazador de Asesinos (Hunter of Murderers) (1983) .... Dra. Campos
- El Gatillo de la Muerte (The Trigger of Death) (1980)
- La Edad de la Tentación (The Age of Temptation) (1959) (as María Eugenia Llamas "Tucita")
- Venganza en el Circo (Vengeance in the Circus) (1954) (as María Eugenia Llamas "Tusita") .... Pulguita
- La Segunda Mujer (The Second Woman) (1953) (as María Eugenia Llamas 'Tucita')
- Una Calle Entre Tú y Yo (The Street Between You and Me) (1952) (as Ma. Eugenia Llamas 'Tusita')
- Los Hijos de La Calle (The Sons of the Street) (1951) (as María Eugenia Llamas 'Tusita')
- The Two Orphans (1950) (as María Eugenia Llamas 'Tusita')
- Los Niños Miran al Cielo (The Children Look to Heaven) (1950)
- El Seminarista (The Theological Student) (1949) .... Tucita
- Dicen Que Soy Mujeriego (They Say that I Am a Womanizer) (1949) .... La Tucita
- Los Tres Huastecos (The Three Men from Huasteca) (1948) .... Tucita

== TV shows ==
- ¡Pedro Infante Vive! (Pedro Infante Lives; 2007).... Herself
- La Historia Detrás del Mito (The Story Behind the Myth) .... Herself (1 episode, 2006)
- Estrellas Infantiles del Cine Mexicano (Child Stars of Mexican Cinema) (2006, TV episode) .... Herself
