= Chachita from Triana =

1947 film

- Directed by: Ismael Rodríguez
- Written by: Enrique Bohorques Bohorques; Carlos González Dueñas; Rogelio A. González; Vicente Oroná; Francisco Pando; Ismael Rodríguez; Pedro de Urdimalas
- Produced by: Armando Espinosa
- Starring: Evita Muñoz; Carlos Martínez Baena; René Cardona
- Cinematography: Agustín Jiménez
- Edited by: Fernando Martínez
- Music by: Rosalío Ramírez
- Production company: Producciones Rodríguez Hermanos
- Release date: 5 November 1947
- Running time: 98 minutes
- Country: Mexico
- Language: Spanish

Chachita from Triana (Spanish: Chachita la de Triana) is a 1947 Mexican comedy drama film directed by Ismael Rodríguez and starring Evita Muñoz, Carlos Martínez Baena and René Cardona. The film's sets were designed by the art director Carlos Toussaint.

== Synopsis ==
A Spanish painter and his Mexican dancer wife travel from Spain to visit his father in Mexico to ask for his assistance. As the older man dislikes women and had opposed their marriage, they get their daughter Chachita to dress up as a boy in order to win over her grandfather.

== Cast ==
- Evita Muñoz as Chachita
- Carlos Martínez Baena as Don Carlos
- René Cardona as Don Roberto
- Jorge Reyes as Che
- Florencio Castelló as José mayordomo
- Luana Alcañiz as Rocío
- Luis Manuel Pelayo as Andrés
- Leonor Gómez as Vecina
- Felipe de Flores
- Raquel Díaz de León
- Pedro de Urdimalas
- Alfonso Jiménez
- Ángel Sampedro 'Angelillo'
- La Pandilla Mexicana

== Bibliography ==
- Riera, Emilio García. Historia documental del cine mexicano: 1946-1948. Universidad de Guadalajara, 1992
- Wilt, David E. The Mexican Filmography, 1916 through 2001. McFarland, 2024.
