= Un príncipe de la iglesia =

Un Príncipe de la iglesia
- Directed by: Miguel M. Delgado
- Written by: Charles Bennett, Eduardo Enrique Rios
- Produced by: Manuel Reachi
- Starring: Carlos Orellana, Ernesto Alonso, Armando Arriola, José Baviera
- Cinematography: Raúl Martínez Solares
- Edited by: José W. Bustos
- Music by: Gustavo César Carrión
- Release date: 9 April 1952
- Running time: 85 minutes
- Country: Mexico
- Language: Spanish

Un Príncipe de la iglesia ("A Prince of the Church") is a 1952 Mexican film. It stars Carlos Orellana.

== Cast ==
- Ernesto Alonso
- Armando Arriola
- Jose Baviera
- Lilia del Valle
- Maria Douglas
- Carlos Orellana
- Charles Rooner
- Wolf Ruvinskis
- Domingo Soler
- Julio Villarreal
- Fernando Wagner
