= The Girl's Aunt =

1938 film

- Directed by: Juan Bustillo Oro
- Written by: Juan Bustillo Oro; Humberto Gómez Landero
- Produced by: Jesús Grovas
- Starring: Enrique Herrera; Joaquín Pardavé; Gloria Marín
- Cinematography: Agustín Jiménez
- Edited by: Juan Bustillo Oro; Mario González
- Music by: Manuel Castro Padilla
- Production companies: Producciónes Grovas; Oro Films
- Distributed by: Cinexport Distributing
- Release date: 16 September 1938
- Running time: 114 minutes
- Country: Mexico
- Language: Spanish

The Girl's Aunt (Spanish: La tía de las muchachas) is a 1938 Mexican comedy film directed by Juan Bustillo Oro and starring Enrique Herrera, Joaquín Pardavé and Gloria Marín. It was shot at the Clasa Studios in Mexico City. The film's sets were designed by the art director Carlos Toussaint. It has a cross-dressing theme similar to Charley's Aunt.

== Synopsis ==
After hearing that her aunt plans to marry off the woman he loves to another man, her boyfriend decides to disguise himself as the aunt to throw push him out of the scene.

== Cast ==
- Enrique Herrera as Licenciado Florentino Carrascosa
- Juan José Martínez Casado as Doctor Fernando Rubio
- Joaquín Pardavé as Goyo Becerra
- Antonio R. Frausto as Chema
- Gloria Marín as Lupita
- Lili Marín as Lolita
- Pilar Fernández as María Luisa Calderón
- Humberto Rodríguez as Calixto, conserje
- Joaquín Coss as Gaspar
- Victoria Argota as Florentina
- Tony Díaz as Cobrador
- Manuel Dondé as Lechero

== Bibliography ==
- Amador, María Luisa. Cartelera cinematográfica, 1930-1939. Filmoteca, UNAM, 1980.
- Avila, Jacqueline. Cinesonidos: Film Music and National Identity During Mexico's Época de Oro. Oxford University Press, 2019.
- Richard, Alfred. Censorship and Hollywood's Hispanic image: an interpretive filmography, 1936-1955. Greenwood Press, 1993.
