= Murallas blancas =

Mexican telenovela

- Genre: Telenovela; Drama
- Starring: María Tereza Montoya; Miguel Manzano
- Country of origin: Mexico
- Original language: Spanish

Production
- Executive producer: Ernesto Alonso
- Production locations: Mexico City, Mexico
- Running time: 42-45 minutes
- Production company: Televisa

Original release
- Network: Telesistema Mexicano
- Release: 1960 – 1960

Murallas blancas is a Mexican telenovela that aired on Canal 4, Telesistema Mexicano in 1960. Produced by Ernesto Alonso, the telenovela focuses on a nurse who does everything possible to save her patients at the hospital where she works.

== Plot ==
This telenovela is set in a hospital where a series of clinical cases is. A young nurse serves as a thread while in consecrates his life helping others.

== Cast ==
- María Tereza Montoya
- Miguel Manzano
- Tony Carbajal
- Carmen Molina
- Consuelo Guerrero de Luna
- Dina de Marco
