= Café de chinos =

- Directed by: Joselito Rodríguez
- Written by: Carlos Orellana (story), Joselito Rodríguez (story)
- Produced by: Astor Films
- Starring: Carlos Orellana, Abel Salazar, Amanda del Llano
- Release date: 2 September 1949
- Running time: 107 minutes
- Country: Mexico
- Language: Spanish

Café de chinos ("Chinese Coffee") is a 1949 Mexican film. It stars Carlos Orellana. The film was produced and distributed by Astor Films, S.A.; there is no evidence this company was in any way connected with the American film production-distribution company Astor Pictures, a recent fan publication about that company notwithstanding.
