= Tú y las nubes =

- Starring: Carlos Orellana
- Release date: 1955
- Country: Mexico
- Language: Spanish

Tú y las nubes ("You and the Clouds") is a 1955 Mexican film starring Carlos Orellana.

== Cast ==
- Miguel Aceves Mejía
- Carlos Bravo y Fernández
- Florencio Castelló
- José Chávez
- Vargas de Tecalitlán ... mariachi
- Carmen Flores
- Lola Flores
- Enrique García Álvarez
- Elmo Michel
- Carlos Orellana
- Antonio Padilla 'Pícoro'
- Raúl Ramírez
- Fernando Soto "Mantequilla"
