= La noche del pecado =

- Starring: Carlos Orellana
- Release date: 1933
- Country: Mexico
- Language: Spanish

La noche del pecado ("The Night of Sin") is a 1933 Mexican film. It stars Carlos Orellana.
