= Arriba las mujeres =

- Directed by: Carlos Orellana,
- Written by: Carlos Orellana(script); Teodoro J. Remírez (play); Joselito Rodríguez (uncredited)
- Produced by: José Rodríguez Granada
- Starring: Carlos Orellana
- Cinematography: José Ortiz Ramos
- Music by: Raúl Lavista
- Release date: 1943
- Running time: 82 Minutes
- Country: Mexico
- Language: Spanish

Arriba las mujeres (English: Top Women) is a 1943 Mexican film. It was directed by and starring Carlos Orellana. Also starring in the film are Consuelo Guerrero de Luna, Antonio Badú and Pedro Infante. Although Infante appeared in several films, this is the only film that he did not sing.

== Plot ==
A strong woman, Felicidad (Gerrero de Luna) unites with her daughters to form a women's union in order to rebel against the men, which includes her own husband, Chuy (Infante) who in turn unites with other husbands as a result.

== Cast list ==
- Consuelo Guerrero de Luna as Felicidad
- Carlos Orellana as Laureano
- Antonio Badú as Zaid Bazur
- Amparo Morillo as Luz Tenue
- Pedro Infante as Chuy
- Margarita Cortés
- Víctor Urruchúa as Enrique
- Virginia Zurí as Amalia
- Manuel Noriega Ruiz as Don Próspero (as Manolo Noriega)
- Arturo Soto Rangel as Juez Leobardo (as A. Soto Rangel)
- Carolina Barret as Tacha
- María Luisa Orellana
