= Victoria Argota =

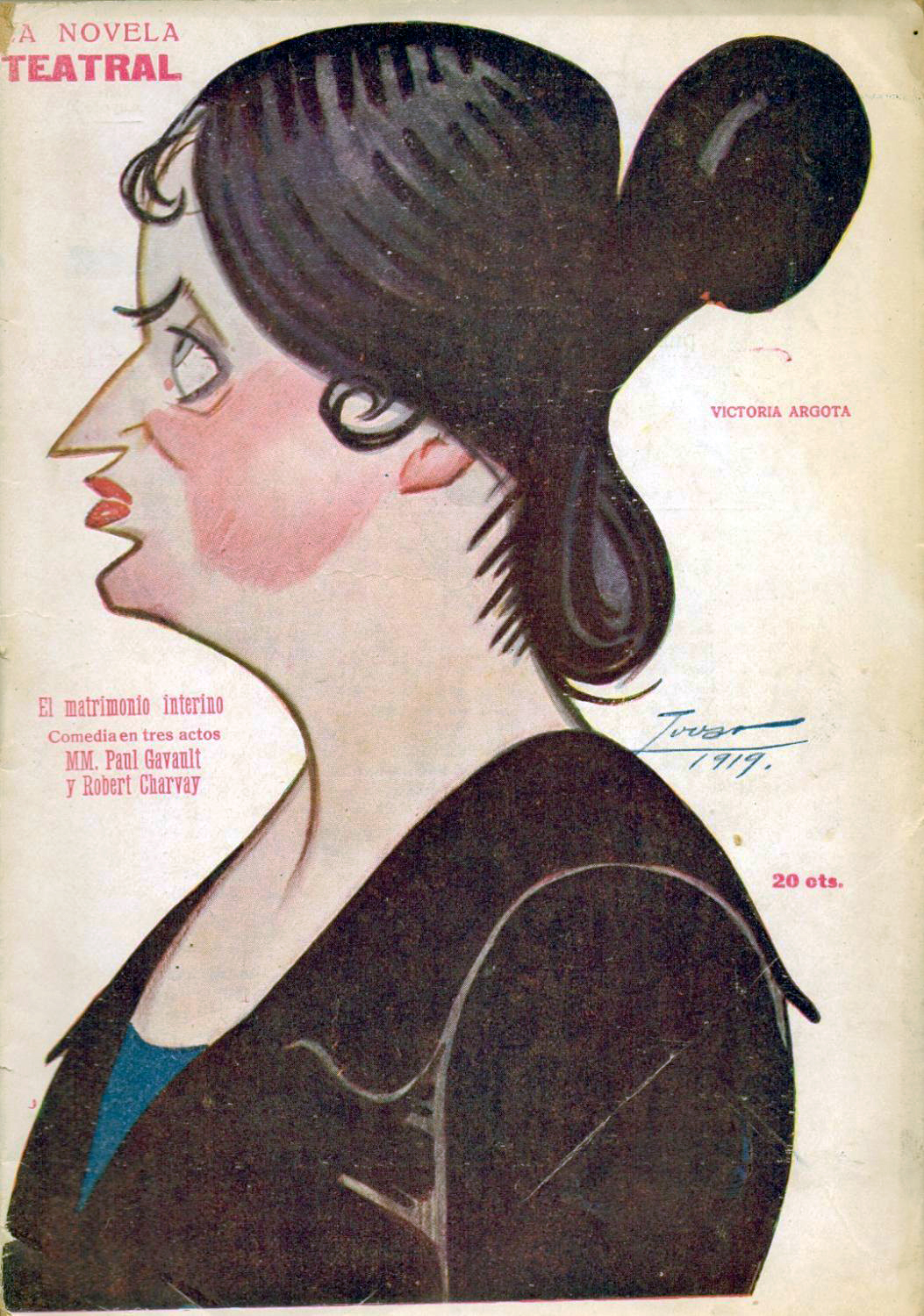
- Born: 23 December 1884; Zaragoza, Aragon, Spain
- Died: January 6, 1959 (aged 74); Mexico City, Mexico
- Occupation: Actress
- Years active: 1938-1955 (film)

Victoria Argota was a Spanish-Mexican film actress.

== Selected filmography ==
- The Girl's Aunt (1938)
- Every Madman to His Specialty (1939)
- In the Times of Don Porfirio (1940)
- Resurrection (1943)
- The Two Orphans (1944)
- Michael Strogoff (1944)
- My Memories of Mexico (1944)
- The Moorish Queen (1955)

== Bibliography ==
- Emilio García Riera. Historia documental del cine mexicano: 1938-1942. University of Guadalajara, 1992.
