= The Woman I Lost =

1949 film

- Directed by: Roberto Rodríguez
- Written by: Carlos González Dueñas; Manuel R. Ojeda
- Starring: Pedro Infante; Blanca Estela Pavón; Silvia Pinal
- Cinematography: Jack Draper
- Edited by: Fernando Martínez Álvarez
- Music by: Raúl Lavista
- Production company: Producciones Rodríguez Hermanos
- Release date: 20 October 1949
- Running time: 94 minutes
- Country: Mexico
- Language: Spanish

The Woman I Lost (Spanish: La mujer que yo perdí) is a 1949 Mexican drama film directed by Roberto Rodríguez and starring Pedro Infante, Blanca Estela Pavón and Silvia Pinal. It was shot at the Tepeyac Studios in Mexico City. The film's sets were designed by the art director Carlos Toussaint.

== Cast ==
- Pedro Infante as Pedro Montaño
- Blanca Estela Pavón as María
- Manuel R. Ojeda as Don Joaquín
- Eduardo Arozamena as Abuelo
- José Luis Jiménez as José Marcos
- Silvia Pinal as Laura
- Aurora Walker as La madrina
- Guillermo Bravo Sosa as Fidel
- Guillermo Calles as Macedonio
- Antonio R. Frausto as Jefe politico
- Conchita Gentil Arcos as Madre de Laura
- Joaquín Roche as Padre de Laura
- Ángel Infante as Marcial
- Salvador Quiroz as Mayor

== Bibliography ==
- Riera, Emilio García. Historia documental del cine mexicano: 1946-1948. Universidad de Guadalajara, 1992
- Wilt, David E. The Mexican Filmography, 1916 through 2001. McFarland, 2024.
