= Evita Muñoz =

Mexican actress (1936–2016)

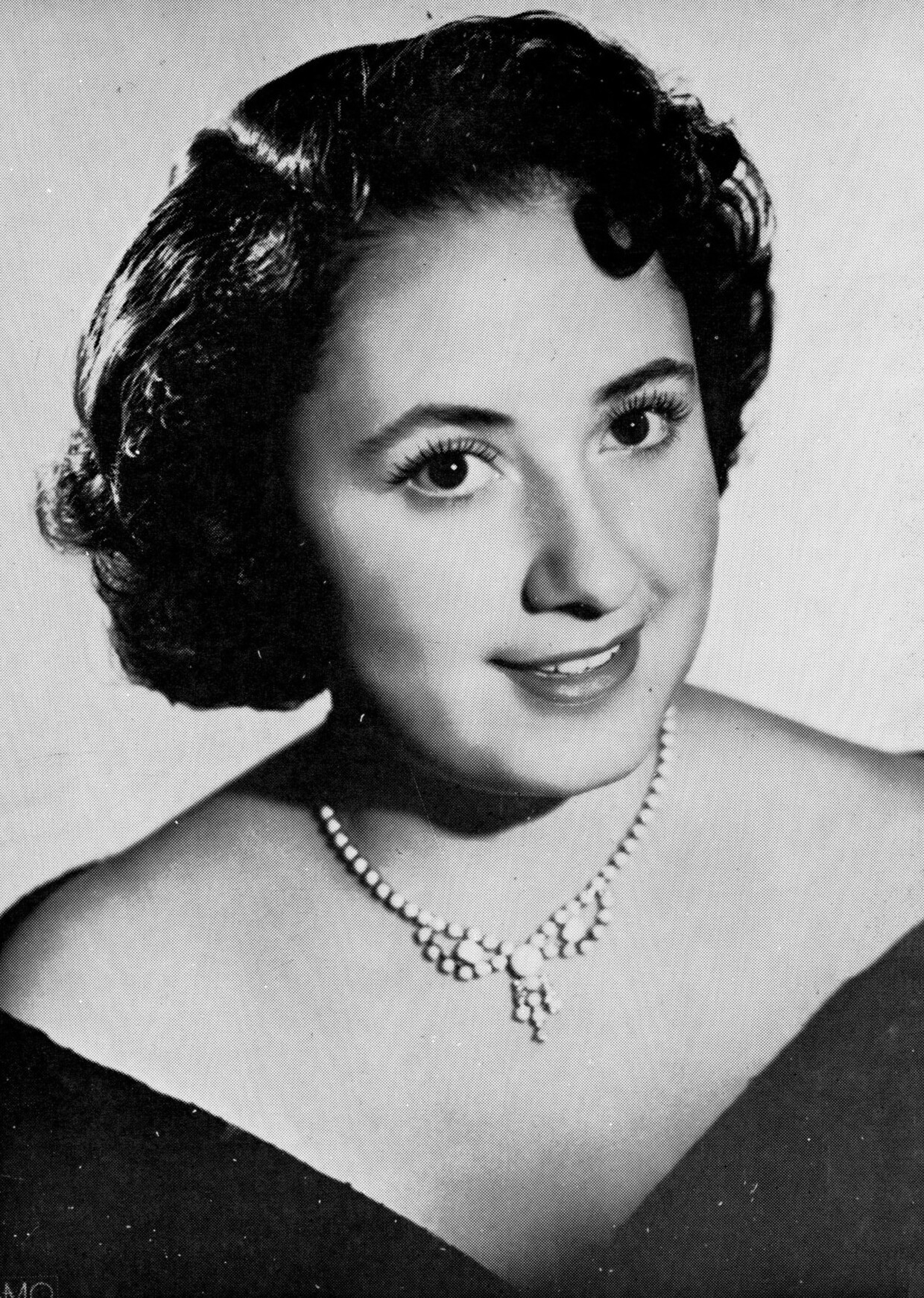
- Muñoz in 1954
- Born: Eva María Muñoz Ruíz; November 26, 1936; Orizaba, Veracruz, Mexico
- Died: August 23, 2016 (aged 79); Mexico City, Mexico
- Occupations: Actress, comedian
- Known for: Chachita in Nosotros los pobres Hermana Carmela in Mundo de juguete Hermelinda Linda in Hermelinda Linda
- Spouse: Hugo Macías (m. 1958)
- Website: m3talentagency.com

Eva María Muñoz Ruíz (November 26, 1936 – August 23, 2016), known professionally as Evita Muñoz "Chachita", was a Mexican actress and comedian. Her professional career began in 1941, when she was only four years old, and she continued performing through, and contributing to, the Golden Age of Mexican cinema. Muñoz was still four years old when she played the character Chachita in her second film, ¡Ay, Jalisco, no te rajes! (Ay! Jalisco, don't back down) (1941), and went on to play Chachita in eight more films and numerous television roles over the subsequent decades, and would be credited as Eva Muñoz "Chachita" in other appearances. For more than 75 years, "Chachita" was recognized as a successful artist in cinema, television, theater, radio, nightclub and circus shows.

== Career ==
At a little under four years old, Muñoz shot her first motion picture, starting a career of starring roles as a child talent; beginning with a minor role in El secreto del sacerdote in 1941. After playing the character Chachita in her second movie, ¡Ay, Jalisco, no te rajes! (1941), she received the nickname "Chachita".

Around 1944, her popularity in starring in her movies led to her starting a radio career in the radio show La legión de madrugadores on the XEQ radio station. In 1947, she signed a contract with CBS in New York to star in the radio serial: Aventuras de una niña, which was broadcast in all Central and South America, and produced by Carlos Montalbán. During the mid-1950s, she played all the female roles in Panzón Panseco's radio sketches, along with Pedro Vargas, and Juan García Esquivel's orchestra (1957): "Ahora es la hora". In the late 1950s, she starred in the show El Risámetro.

To promote her movie La Hija del Payaso (1946), in which she performed along with trained elephants and dogs, Muñoz learned to play the marimba and the xylophone. She made personal appearances with the Atayde Circus when she was only eight years old. During her teenage years, she costarred with Pedro Infante in the trilogy: Nosotros los pobres (1948), Ustedes los ricos (1948) and Pepe el Toro (1952).

She was invited by Pérez Prado as a mambo dancer for a tour all over the Philippines and Japan where she became a sensation. During that tour they also performed in USO shows during the Korean War for the Hispanic-American soldiers.

In the 1970s Muñoz played the role of "Sister Carmela", a novice nun in the Mexican versión of the soap opera Mundo de Juguete. In 1975, she starred in the variety show Un hombre y una mujer with Fernando Allende. She appeared as a guest star on episodes of various American television shows, including Columbo and I Spy, as well as live performances in the Million Dollar Theatre in Los Angeles, California. During the 1980s, she played the role of the witch Hermelinda Linda in several films. On television, she co-starred with Jorge Ortiz de Pinedo in the sitcom Dos mujeres en mi casa. In 1986, she co-starred in the sitcom Nosotros los Gómez.

In the 1990s, Muñoz continued working in a series of soap operas for Televisa, as well as making films such as De lengua me como un plato. She played a nun from northern Mexico in Cambiando el destino with the band Magneto. In the 2000s, Muñoz starred in several episodes of Mujer: Casos de la vida real and lent her voice to CGI animated characters.

=== 2010s ===
In 2008, Muñoz played a role in Televisa's soap opera Cuidado con el ángel that was broadcast all around the globe and appeared in the 2011 season of Sesame Street – Mexico. In 2016, Muñoz celebrated 75 years of an uninterrupted artistic career.

For her countless contributions to the Television, Theater and Motion Picture industries, Muñoz' handprints have been embedded onto the Paseo de las Luminarias in Mexico City.

== Personal life ==
Muñoz married Hugo Macías when she was 22, and they had three children.

Muñoz died in Mexico City, Mexico on August 23, 2016, due to complications from pneumonia. She was 79.

== Filmography ==
=== Cinema ===
- El secreto del sacerdote (1941) – Martita
- ¡Ay, Jalisco, no te rajes! (1941) – Chachita
- Beautiful Michoacán (1943) – Chachita
- Morenita clara (1943) – Chachita
- La pequeña madrecita (1944)
- La hija del payaso (1946)
- ¡Qué verde era mi padre! (1947) – Chachita
- Yo vendo unos ojos negros (1947) – Carmencita Sandoval
- Chachita from Triana (1947) – Chachita
- Nosotros los pobres (1948) – Chachita
- Ustedes los ricos (1948) – Chachita
- Guardián, el perro salvador (1948) – Chachita
- The Two Orphans (1950) – Elvira Pérez
- El Cristo de mi cabecera (1951) – Marcela
- Los hijos de la calle (1951) – Elvira Pérez
- Los pobres siempre van al Cielo (1951) – Lupita
- La hija de la otra (1951) – Lupita
- Una calle entre tú y yo (1952) – Marta
- Pepe el Toro (1952) – Chachita
- Padre Nuestro (1953) – Elisa Molina
- La locura del Rock ´n Roll (1957)
- Así era Pancho Villa (1957) – Remedios
- El hombre que me gusta (1958) – Serafica, criada
- Bajo el cielo de México (1958) – Flora
- Mis padres se divorcian (1959) – Maruja, amiga de Fernando
- Mi niño, mi caballo y yo (1959)
- En cada feria un amor (1961) – Rosaura
- Dos tontos y un loco (1961) – Cuquis
- El dengue del amor (1965)
- Gigantes planetarios (1965) – Frijol
- Cuando el diablo sopla (1966)
- La muerte es puntual (1967) – Creolina
- Faltas a la moral (1970) – Doña Cata, la pulques
- La hermana Trinquete (1970) – Turista gorda
- Cayó de la gloria el diablo (1972) – Nachita
- Peluquero de señoras (1973) – Socorro, gorda
- El padrino... es mi compadre (1974)
- La palomilla al rescate (1976) – Rosa
- La casa prohibida (1981)
- El barrendero (1981) – Pachita
- El que no Corre Vuela (1982) – Doña Chona 'La Gorda'
- Vividores de mujeres (1982) – Julia Ester
- Los fayuqueros de Tepito (1982)
- Las musiqueras (1983) – Chachita Rubiales
- En el camino andamos (1983)
- Romancing the Stone (1984) – Hefty Woman
- Hermelinda Linda (1984) – Hermelinda Linda
- Los humillados (1984)
- El sinaloense (1985)
- Máscara contra bikini (1986)
- Agente 0013: Hermelinda Linda 2 (1986) – Hermelinda Linda
- Dos machos que ládran no muerden (1988)
- Día de madres (1988) – Rosita
- De lengua, me como un plato (1990)
- Cambiando el destino (1992) – Hermana Margarita
- Serafín: La película (2001) – Cocó (voice)
- Meet the Robinsons (2007) – (voice)

=== Television ===
- Columbo - A matter of honor (1975)

==== Soap operas ====
- Gutierritos (1958) – Ana
- Corona de lágrimas (1964)
- El amor tiene cara de mujer (1971)
- Mundo de Juguete (1974–1977) – Hermana Carmela / Tía Vladimira
- Ángeles sin paraíso (1992) – Asunción 'Mamá Chonita'
- Bendita mentira (1996) – Goya
- Gotita de amor (1998) – Lolita
- Serafín (1999) – Coco (voice)
- Nunca te olvidaré (1999) – Benita
- Alma rebelde (1999) – Bernarda
- Siempre te amaré (2000) – Estellita
- Contra viento y marea (2005) – Doña Cruz Cárdenas
- Cuidado con el ángel (2008–2009) – Candelaria
- Como dice el dicho (2011) – Clara
- Qué bonito amor (2012–2013) – Doña Prudencia

==== Situation comedies ====
- Nosotros los Gómez
- Dos Mujeres en mi Casa

==== Video theatre ====
- 'The Imaginary Invalid' (or The Hypochondriac) "Le Malade imaginaire" by Moliere

=== Theatre ===
- (1957) Fin de semana (Hay Fever), by Noël Coward
- (1957) La casa de la primavera, de Fernand Millaud – Yolanda Lambert
- (1958) Mujercitas (Little Women), by Louisa May Alcott – Jo March
- (1959) Las cosas simples, by Héctor Mendoza
- (1962) Despedida de soltera, by Alfonso Anaya B.
- (1964) El segundo aire de mama y papa, by Alfonso Paso
- (1966) Le pondremos talco al niño, by Jean de Létraz
- (1967) Baby shower. Una fiesta embarazosa – Eugenia
- (1972) Doce mil pesos por mi mujer – Carmen
- (1974) Dos naufragos tras el pescado (La pequeña choza), by André Roussin
- (1976) Travesuras de medianoche, by Anthony Marriot – Mónica Johnson
- (1977) Se armó la gorda (Melocotón en almíbar), by Miguel Mihura
- (1978) Fiebre de fin de semana (Hay Fever), by Noël Coward
- (1979) Espíritu travieso (Blithe Spirit), by Noël Coward
- (1980) Vidas privadas (Private Lives), by Noël Coward
- (1981) El médico a palos (Le médecin malgré lui), by Jean Baptiste Poquelin "Molière"
- (1982) Cueros y pieles, by Ray Cooney
- (1983) Los amores criminales de las vampiras Morales, by Hugo Argüelles – Rosa Fulvia
- (1984) Las modelos de Chachita
- (1986) Vengan corriendo que les tengo un muerto, by Varelita
- (1996) Fiebre de fin de semana (Hay Fever), by Noël Coward
- (2001) Máscara contra cabellera, by Victor Hugo Rascón Banda
