= The Miracle Song =

- Directed by: Rolando Aguilar
- Written by: Eduardo Enrique Rios (adaptation), Eduardo Enrique Rios (screenplay)
- Produced by: Promex
- Starring: Carlos Orellana, José Lupita Gallardo and Estela Inda
- Release date: 10 May 1940
- Running time: 85 minutes
- Country: Mexico
- Language: Spanish

The Miracle Song (Spanish: La canción del milagro) is a 1940 Mexican musical drama film directed by Rolando Aguilar. It stars Carlos Orellana.
