= Antonio R. Frausto =

Mexican actor

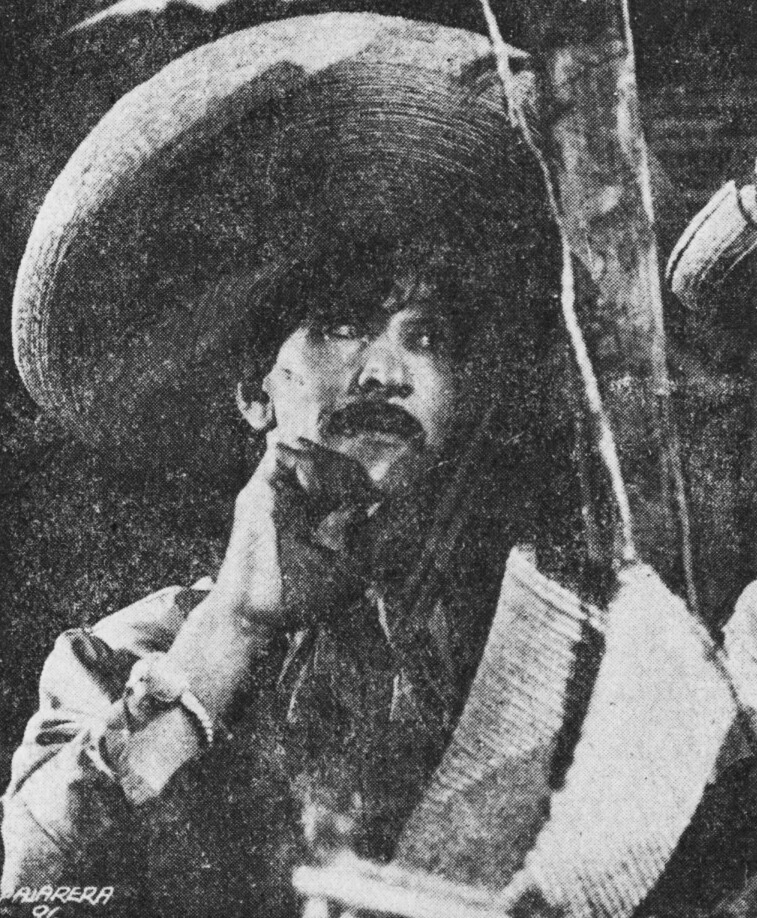
- Antonio R. Frausto in 1945
- Born: 20 September 1897; San Luis Potosi, Mexico
- Died: 29 January 1954 (aged 56); Mexico City, Mexico
- Occupation: Actor
- Years active: 1932–1952 (film)

Antonio R. Frausto (20 September 1897 – 29 January 1954) was a Mexican film actor. A leading character actor he became a familiar face during the Golden age of Mexican cinema, appearing more than ninety films. He played the nineteenth century dictator of Mexico Porfirio Díaz on screen several times.

== Selected filmography ==
- Santa (1932)
- Revolution (1933)
- Godfather Mendoza (1934)
- Juarez and Maximilian (1934)
- Gold and Silver (1934)
- Let's Go with Pancho Villa (1936)
- Such Is My Country (1937)
- Beautiful Mexico (1938)
- Huapango (1938)
- The Girl's Aunt (1938)
- The Coward (1939)
- Every Madman to His Specialty (1939)
- Narciso's Hard Luck (1940)
- I Will Live Again (1940)
- You're Missing the Point (1940)
- Alejandra (1942)
- Father Gets Entangled Again (1942)
- Doña Bárbara (1943)
- Father Morelos (1943)
- Lightning in the South (1943)
- My Memories of Mexico (1944)
- La China poblana (1944)
- The Escape (1944)
- The Hour of Truth (1945)
- Tragic Wedding (1946)
- It's Not Enough to Be a Charro (1946)
- The Three Garcias (1947)
- The Garcias Return (1947)
- Felipe Was Unfortunate (1947)
- Los tres huastecos (1948)
- The Woman I Lost (1949)
- Midnight (1949)
- The Black Sheep (1949)
- Orange Blossom for Your Wedding (1950)
- Anacleto Gets Divorced (1950)
- Over the Waves (1950)
- María Montecristo (1951)
- Now I Am Rich (1952)
- El Enamorado (1952)

== Bibliography ==
- Mora, Carl J. Mexican Cinema: Reflections of a Society, 1896-2004. McFarland, 2005.
