= El secreto de la monja =

- Starring: Carlos Orellana
- Release date: 1940
- Country: Mexico
- Language: Spanish

El secreto de la monja ("The Secret of the Nun") is a 1940 Mexican film. It stars Carlos Orellana.
