= Enrique Herrera (actor) =

Cuban actor

- Born: Angel Enrique Herrera Rodriguez; 5 July 1904; Havana, Cuba
- Died: 28 December 1991 (aged 87); Mexico City, Mexico
- Occupation: Actor
- Years active: 1933 - 1966 (film)

Enrique Herrera (July 4, 1904 – December 28, 1991) was a Cuban film actor who settled in Mexico. He played the role of Emperor Maximilian in the 1934 Mexican historical film Juarez and Maximillian. He wrote, produced and directed the 1940 comedy film Narciso's Hard Luck, his only non-acting credits.

== Selected filmography ==
- Juárez y Maximiliano (1934)
- La paloma (1937)
- Huapango (1938)
- Cada loco con su tema (1938)
- The Girl's Aunt (1938)
- Horse for Horse (1939)
- Every Madman to His Specialty (1939)
- Los apuros de Narciso (1940)
- Mil estudiantes y una muchacha (1941)
- Hotel de verano (1944)
- Una mujer que no miente (1944)
- Yo soy usted (1944)
- Cuando quiere un mexicano (1944)
- Me he de comer esa tuna (1945)
- Lo que va de ayer a hoy (1945)
- El superhombre (1946)
- El conquistador (1947)
- Canasta uruguaya (1951)
- Los dos rivales (1966)

== Bibliography ==
- Herzberg, Bob. Revolutionary Mexico on Film: A Critical History, 1914-2014. McFarland, 2014.
