= Miente y serás feliz =

1940 Mexican film starring Carlos Orellana

- Directed by: Raphael J. Sevilla
- Starring: Carlos Orellana
- Release date: 1940
- Country: Mexico
- Language: Spanish

Miente y serás feliz ("Lie and be Happy") is a 1940 Mexican comedy film directed by Raphael J. Sevilla and starring Carlos Orellana.

== Cast ==
- Carlos Orellana as Don Juan
- Sara García as Constancia
- Emilio Tuero as Luis
- Josefina Escobedo as Pilar
- Eduardo Arozamena as Doctor
- Emma Roldán as Doña Margarita
- José Ortiz de Zárate as Toval
