= Víctor Manuel Mendoza =

Mexican actor

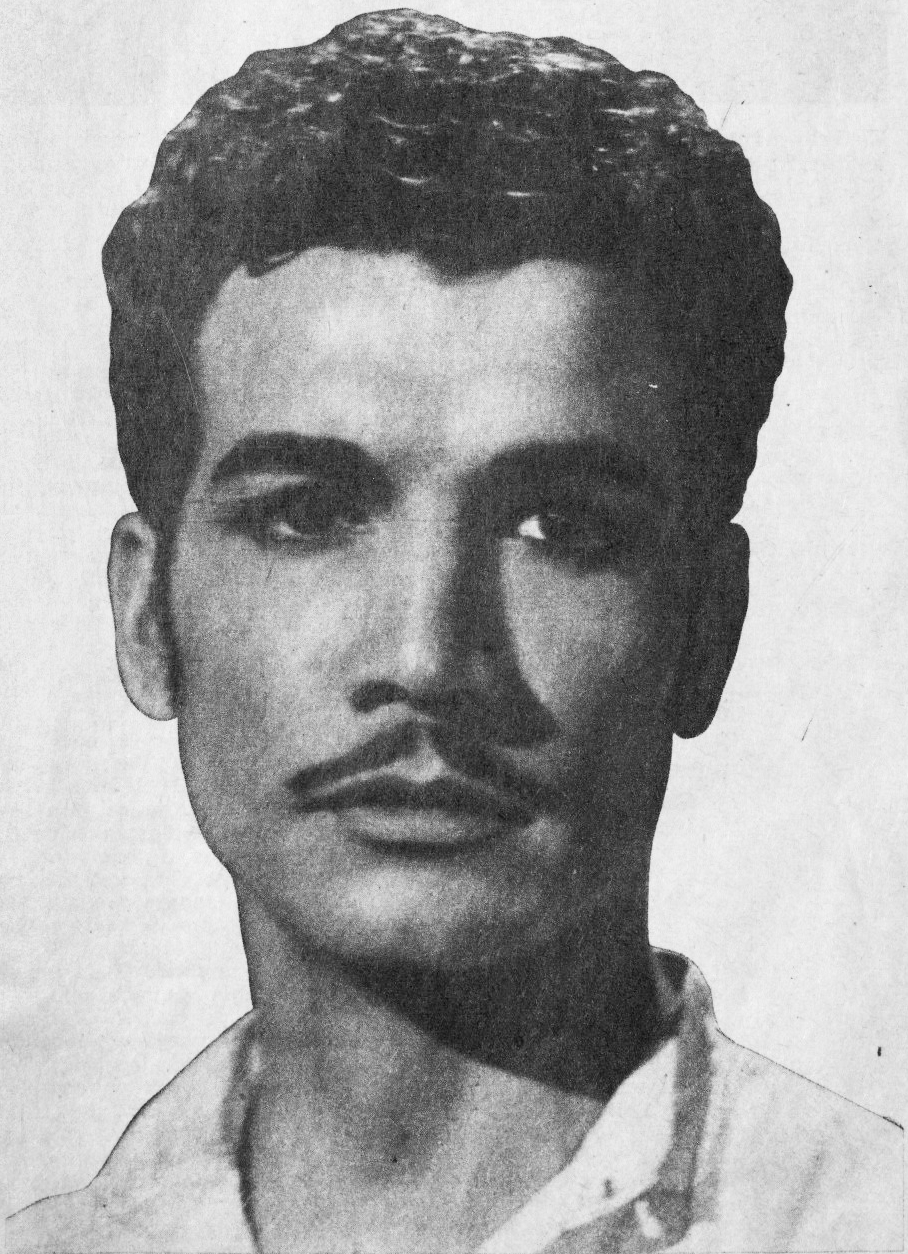
- Víctor Manuel Mendoza in 1948
- Born: 19 October 1913; Tala, Jalisco, Mexico
- Died: 19 July 1995 (aged 81); Mexico
- Occupation: Actor
- Years active: 1937-1991 (film)

Víctor Manuel Mendoza (1913–1995) was a Mexican film actor.

== Selected filmography ==
- Almas rebeldes (1937)
- Ojos tapatios (1938) - Carlos
- Los bandidos de Río Frío (1938) - Juan Robreño
- While Mexico Sleeps (1938)
- Pescadores de perlas (1938) - Ignacio
- Sangre en las montañas (1938)
- Alma norteña (1939) - Agustín
- Rosa de Xochimilco (1939) - husband
- ¡Ay Jalisco... no te rajes! (1941) - Felipe Carbajal
- Águila roja (1942) - Víctor Reyes
- Simón Bolívar (1942) - La Mar
- Beautiful Michoacán (1943) - Roque
- Santa (1943) - Marcelino
- El ametralladora (1943) - Felipe Carvajal
- Cuando habla el corazón (1943) - Cruz González
- Los amores de un torero (1945) - Ernesto
- The Mulatta of Cordoba (1945)
- Recuerdos de mi valle (1946)
- Pervertida (1946) - Humberto
- Cuando lloran los valientes (1947) - Coronel José Luis Arteche
- The Three Garcias (1947) - Luis Manuel García
- The Garcias Return (1947) - Luis Manuel García
- Mi madre adorada (1948)
- Flor de caña (1948) - Román
- Bamba (1949) - Lino Mena
- La panchita (1949) - Benjamín
- Tierra muerta (1949)
- Venus de fuego (1949)
- Veracruz Passion (1950)
- Tacos joven (1950)
- La tienda de la esquina (1951) - Víctor
- Susana (1951) - Jesús
- Nunca debieron amarse (1951) - Agustín
- Cartas a Ufemia (1952) - Ignacio Vélez
- Maria del Mar (1952) - Salvador
- The Strange Passenger (1953) - Rodolfo Castillo
- Reportaje (1953) - García, Press operator
- The Proud and the Beautiful (1954) - Don Rodrigo, Hotel Owner
- Garden of Evil (1954) - Vicente Madariaga
- The Black Pirates (1954) - Castro
- María la Voz (1955) - Pablo Canefa el Espejo
- El Túnel 6 (1955) - Gustavo
- La doncella de piedra (1956) - Demetrio Montiel de los Montieles
- Pueblo, canto y esperanza (1956) - Black man (Colombian episode)
- Talpa (1956) - Tanilo
- Y si ella volviera (1957) - Guillermo Castro
- Cowboy (1958) - Paco Mendoza - Ramrod
- The Wonderful Country (1959) - Gen. Marcos Castro
- La sombra del caudillo (1960) - General Elizondo
- Los hermanos Del Hierro (1961) - Fidencio Cruz
- La soldadera (1966) - Major Castro Virgen
- El caballo Bayo (1969)
- Las puertas del paraíso (1971)
- El tigre de Santa Julia (1974) - the Devil
- La otra virginidad (1975) - Don Luis Romero Bracamontes, Adrián's father
- Pantaleón y las visitadoras (1976)
- Traigo la sangre caliente (1977)
- El tren de la muerte (1979) - Sheriff
- Herencia de muerte (1981) - Rodolfo del Fierro
- La combi asesina (1982) - Old man
- Historia de una mujer escandalosa (1984)
- ¡Ay Carmela! (1990) - Official
- Cartel de la droga (1990)
- Pedro infante vive? (1991) - Victor Manuel Mendoza (final film role)

== Bibliography ==
- Rogelio Agrasánchez. Guillermo Calles: A Biography of the Actor and Mexican Cinema Pioneer. McFarland, 2010.
