= Blanca Estela Pavón =

Mexican film actress and singer (1926–1949)

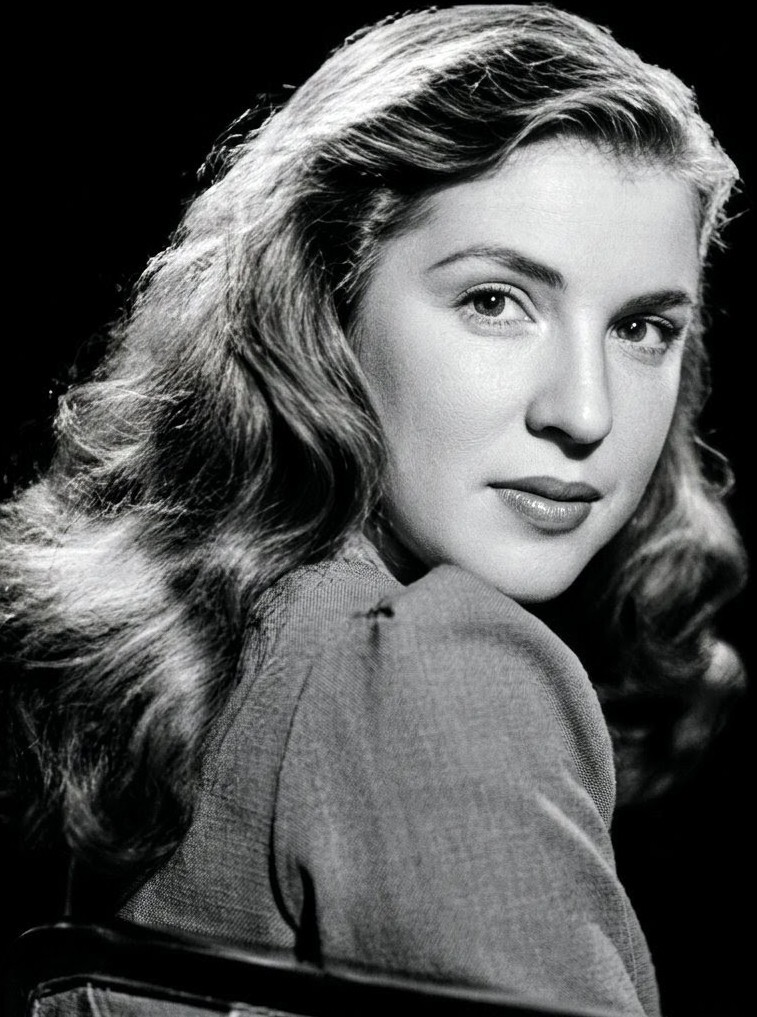
- Blanca Estela Pavón in 1949
- Born: María Blanca Estela Pavón Vasconcelos; February 21, 1926; Minatitlán, Veracruz, Mexico
- Died: September 26, 1949 (aged 23); Popocatépetl, Mexico
- Years active: 1941–1949

María Blanca Estela Pavón Vasconcelos (February 21, 1926 – September 26, 1949) was a Mexican film actress and singer of the Golden Age of Mexican cinema.

She appeared in several classic films of the 1940s. Her career peaked in 1948 and 1949.

She won an Ariel Award for Best Actress in the 1947 film Cuando lloran los valientes (transl: When the brave cry) and was nominated for another due to her successful performances in Mexican films.

She starred alongside Mexican star Pedro Infante in several films, including Nosotros los Pobres in 1948.

On September 26, 1949, she died in a plane crash near the Popocatépetl volcano located between Mexico City and Puebla with her father Francisco and another 22 people on board. There were no survivors.

== Filmography ==
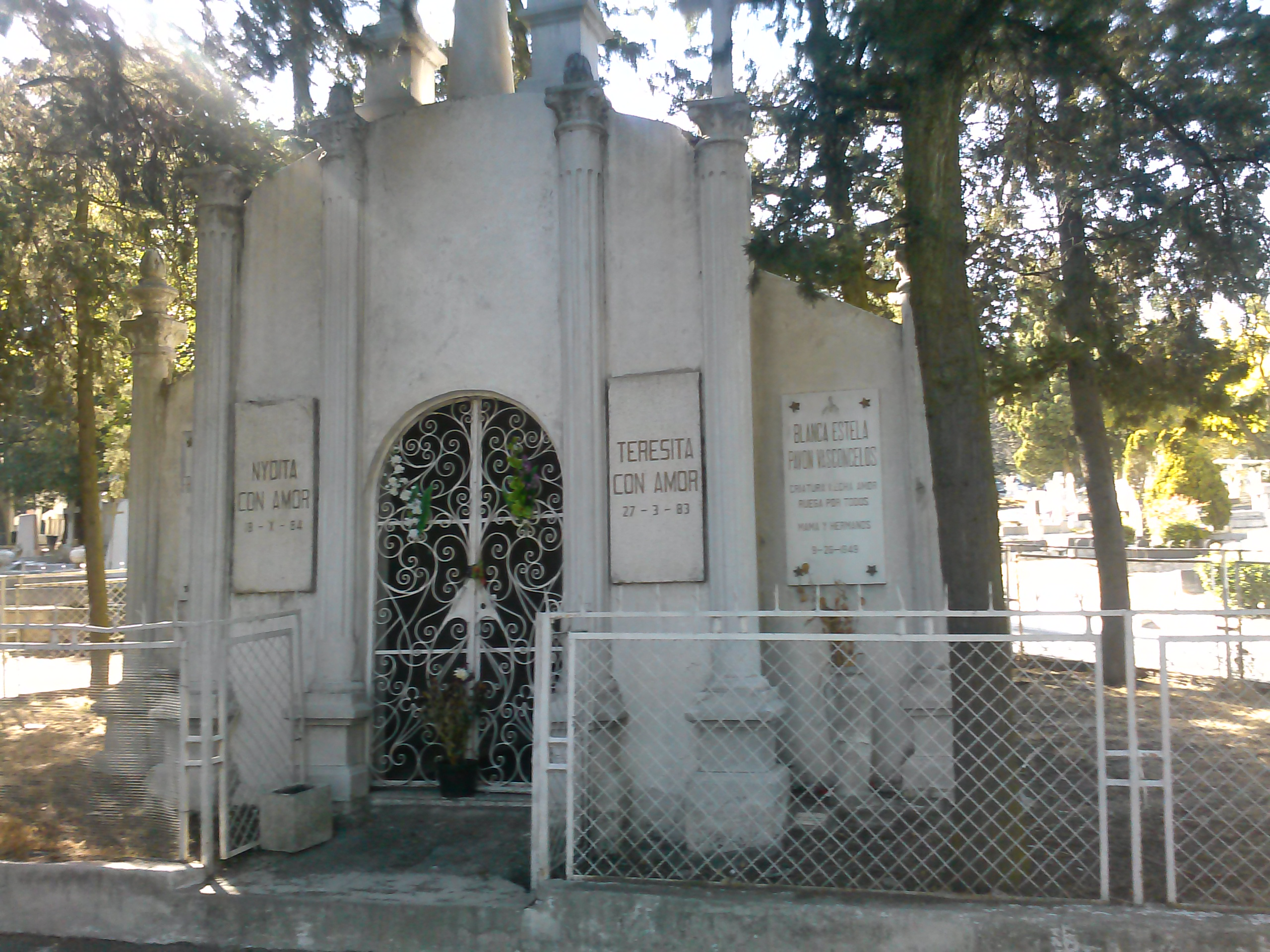
Tomb of Blanca Estela on the Jardín cemetery.

- The League of Songs (1941)
- El Niño de las Monjas (1944)
- Cuando lloran los Valientes (1947)
- The Garcias Return (1947)
- Los Tres Huastecos (1948)
- La bien pagada (1948)
- Nosotros los Pobres (1948)
- Cortesana (1948)
- The Well-paid (1948)
- En los Altos de Jalisco (1948)
- Ustedes los Ricos (1948)
- Love in Every Port (1949)
- Las puertas del presidio (1949)
- The Woman I Lost (1949)
- Ladronzuela (1949)

== Ariel Awards ==
Year	Category	Work	Result
1948	Mejor Actriz	Cuando Lloran los Valientes	Winner
1949	Mejor Actriz	Ustedes los ricos	Nominated
