= Abel Salazar (actor) =

Mexican actor (1917-1995)

- Born: Abel Salazar García; 24 September 1917; Mexico City, Mexico
- Died: 21 October 1995 (aged 78); Cuernavaca, Morelos, Mexico
- Occupations: Actor, film director
- Years active: 1941–1989
- Spouses: Alicia Cárdenas (m. 1944; div. 1950); Gloria Marín (m. 1958; div. 1960); Rosita Arenas (m. 1960)
- Children: 3

Abel Salazar García (24 September 1917 – 21 October 1995) was a Mexican actor, producer and director. He appeared in 70 films between 1941 and 1989.

== Personal life ==
After marriages to Alicia Cárdenas, daughter of former Mexican President Lazaro Cardenas, and Gloria Marín, he married, lastly, Rosita Arenas, who had been briefly married to Spanish actor Jaime de Mora y Aragón. Salazar and Arenas had a daughter, Rosa Salazar Arenas, a Mexican actress and screenwriter.

He died of respiratory failure and Alzheimer's disease in 1995.

== Selected filmography ==
- La casa del Rencor (1941)
- The League of Songs (1941)
- La Virgen morena (1942)
- Capullito de Alhelí (1944)
- The Three Garcias (1947)
- The Garcias Return (1947)
- Mi esposa busca novio (1947)
- The Prince of the Desert (1947)
- La Panchita (1948)
- Aunt Candela (1948)
- Dos pesos dejada (1949)
- Me ha besado un hombre (1949)
- Una viuda sin sostén (1950)
- What Has That Woman Done to You? (1951)
- La Duquesa del Tepetate (1951)
- Canasta uruguaya (1951)
- From the Can-Can to the Mambo (1951)
- Seven Women (1953)
- Mañana cuando amanezca (1954)
- The Coyote (1955)
- El vampiro (1957)
- El hombre y el monstruo (1958)
- The White Renegade (1960)
- El mundo de los vampiros (The World Of The Vampires) (1961)
- The Curse of the Crying Woman (La maldición de la llorona) (1961)
- The Brainiac (El baron del terror) (1962)
- The Adolescents (1968) director
- Tres Mujeres en la Hoguera (1976)
- Ya Nunca Mas (Never Again) (1984) director—marks the film debut of Luis Miguel.
