= Gloria Marín =

Mexican actress (1919–1983)

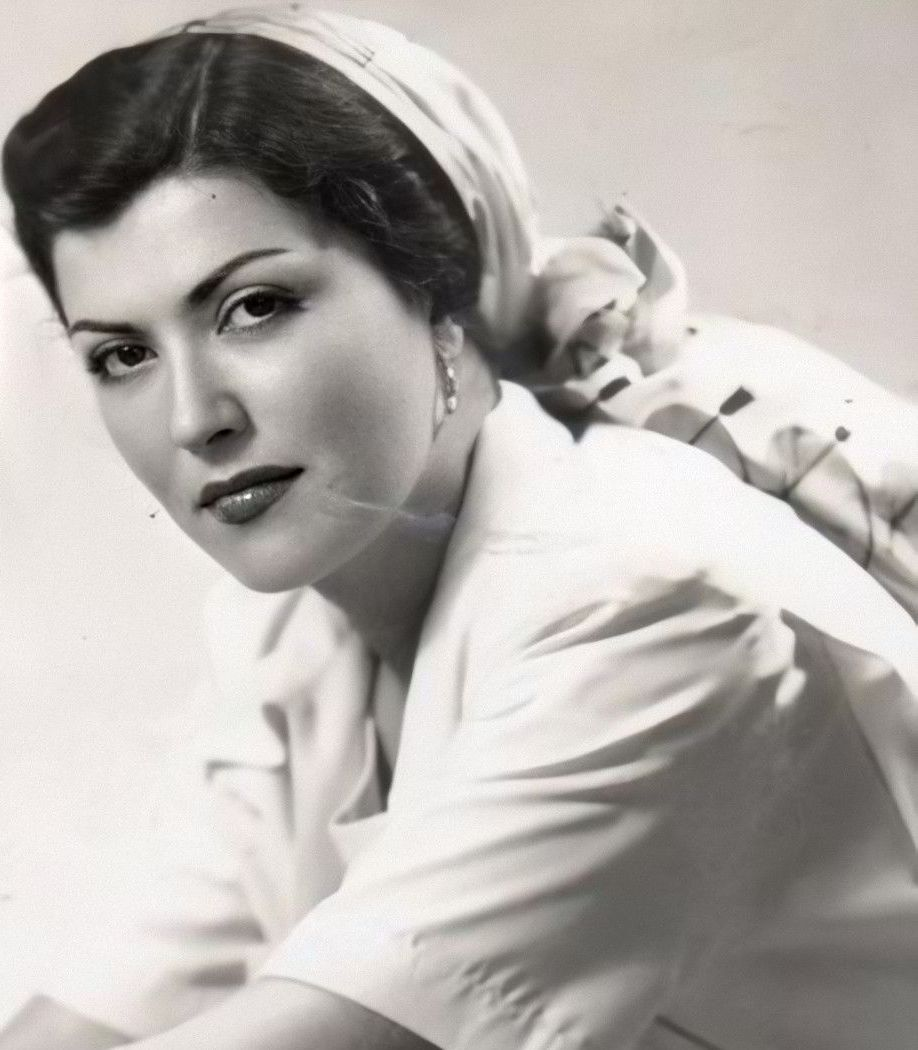
- Marín, c. 1955
- Born: Gloria Méndez Ramos; 19 April 1919; Mexico City, Mexico
- Died: 13 April 1983 (aged 63); Mexico City, Mexico
- Resting place: Panteón Jardín
- Other name: Gloria Ramos Luna
- Occupation: Actress
- Years active: 1938–1983
- Spouse: Abel Salazar (m. 1958; div. 1960)
- Partner: Jorge Negrete (1942-1952)
- Children: 1
- Relatives: Pedro Armendáriz (cousin)

Gloria Méndez Ramos (19 April 1919 – 13 April 1983), known professionally as Gloria Marín, was a Mexican actress. She was considered a celebrated female star of the Golden Age of Mexican cinema.

During her career, Marín appeared in about 100 films and television series. She received an Ariel Award nomination for her leading performance in the 1948 film Si Adelita se fuera con otro.

== Biography ==
Gloria Méndez Ramos was the daughter of dancer María Laura Ramos Luna (who used the artistic name Laura Marín) and businessman Pedro Méndez Armendáriz, and a cousin of actor Pedro Armendáriz. She began her career at age six, alongside her mother who ran a theater company in Mexico City. She also worked later in the Mayab and in the carpa of Santa María la Ribera where the comedian Joaquín Pardavé offers her first opportunity in the cinema.

She debuted in the film Los millones de Chaflán (1939). At age 15, she married the official Arturo Vargas (forwarding agent). She made 19 films between 1938 and 1941. She performed with Cantinflas in El gendarme desconocido in 1941.

That same year she met Jorge Negrete in the filming of ¡Ay, Jalisco, no te rajes!, when she was 22 and he 30 years old. Although Negrete was already married, they both had a chemistry both on and off the camera which became evident in the film. After the movie they remained friends, but when Negrete returned from New York to film his next movie, they began a stormy relationship that lasted ten years. They lived together but never married, talking about their relationship as a 'marriage' and later a 'divorce' after 1952, when they separated. In 1951 they adopted a daughter, Virginia. They co-starred in 10 films together.

Marín was nominated for a Silver Ariel Award for her performance in Si Adelita se fuera con otro. In 1942, she appeared with Fernando Soler in ¡Que hombre tán simpático!. She also appeared with Arturo de Córdova in the films El conde de Montecristo (1942) and Crepúsculo (1945). She married actor Abel Salazar in Mexico City on 31 May 1958; the couple divorced in 1960.

She won two Diosas de Plata Awards for her work in the movies Mecánica nacional (1972) and Presagio (1974). For 30 years, Gloria starred in several telenovelas like La hiena, Los hermanos Coraje and La maldición de La Blonda, among others. She starred in several stage plays such as Debiera haber obispas, Tan cerca del cielo and La jaula de cristal. Her last notable role was as the Mother Superior in the telenovela Mundo de juguete.

== Death ==
Marín died at the Hospital Español in Mexico City on 13 April 1983, six days before her 64th birthday, because of emphysema. She was interred at Panteón Jardín.

== Filmography ==
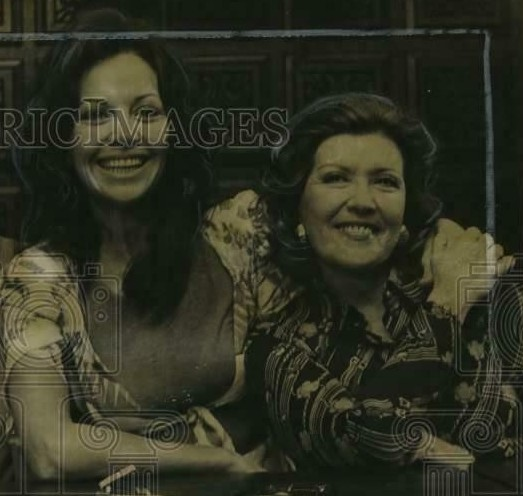
Marín with Isela Vega in 1975.

=== Movies ===
- Cruz de olvido (1983)
- Aquel famoso Remington (That famous Remington) (1982)
- El vuelo de la cigüeña (Flight of the Stork) (1979)
- En la trampa (In the trap) (1979)
- Coyote and Bronca (1978)
- Acto de posesión (Act of possession) (1977)
- Presagio (1975) .... Dueña de la cantina
- Los perros de Dios (God's dogs) (1974)
- National Mechanics (1972) .... Dora
- El festín de la loba (The She-Wolf's Feast) (1972)
- Nadie te querrá como yo (No One Will Love You Like I Will) (1972)
- Ave sin nido (Bird Without a Nest) (1971) (Mexico)
- El criado malcriado (The Ill-Mannered Manservant) (1969) .... Esperanza
- Primera comunión (First communion) (1969)
- Las visitaciones del diablo (Visitations of the Devil) (1968) .... Arminda
- Bromas, S.A. (Jokes, Inc.) (1967)
- La muerte es puntual (Death is punctual) (1967)
- La piel de Zapa (1964)
- La justicia del Coyote (The Coyote's justice) (1956) .... Mara
- El caso de la mujer asesinadita (The Case of the Murdered Little Lady) (1955)
- The Coyote (The coyote) (1955)
- Pecado mortal (Mortal sin) (1955)
- Nuevo amanecer (1954)
- Ley fuga (1954)
- El fantasma se enamora (The ghost falls in love) (1953)
- Ni pobres ni ricos (Neither rich nor poor) (1953)
- Un gallo en corral ajeno (Rooster in a Foreign Corral) (1952)
- El derecho de nacer (The right to be born) (1952) .... María Elena
- Mujer de medianoche (Midnight woman) (1952)
- Hay un niño en su futuro (There is a child in your future) (1952)
- Forever Yours (1952) .... Soledad
- El sol sale para todos (The sun sets for everyone) (1950)
- El pecado de quererte (The sin of loving you) (1950) .... Graciela
- Witch's Corner (1949)
- La venenosa (The poisonous woman) (1949)
- Si Adelita se fuera con otro (If Adelita goes out with another) (1948)
- Bel Ami (1947) .... Magdalena
- En tiempos de la Inquisición (In the times of the Inquisition) (1946)
- La noche y tú (The night and you) (1946)
- The Associate (1946)
- Canaima (1945) .... Maigualida
- Hasta que perdió Jalisco (Until Jalisco loses) (1945)
- Una mujer que no miente (A woman who doesn't lie) (1945)
- Twilight (1945) .... Lucía
- Alma de bronce (Soul of Bronze) (1944)
- Así son ellas (That's How They Are) (1944)
- Una carta de amor (A Love Letter) (1943) .... Marta María Mireles
- Tentación (Temptation) (1943)
- El jorobado (The Hunchback) (1943) .... Aurora de Nevers
- La posada sangrienta (Inn of Blood) (1943)
- Qué hombre tan simpático (1943)
- Beautiful Michoacán (1943)
- La virgen que forjó una patria (The virgin who forged a fatherland) (1942) .... Xochiquiauit
- Historia de un gran amor (Story of a great love) (1942) .... Soledad
- The Count of Monte Cristo (1942)
- Seda, sangre y sol (Silk, blood, and sand) (1942) .... Rosario Gómez
- El que tenga un amor (He who has love) (1942)
- La gallina clueca (1941)
- ¡Ay, Jalisco, no te rajes! (Oh! Jalisco, don't give up!) (1941) .... Carmela
- The Unknown Policeman (1941) with Cantinflas
- Amor chinaco (1941)
- The 9.15 Express (1941)
- Cuando los hijos se van (When the children leave) (1941) .... Mimi
- El jefe máximo (The great boss) (1940)
- Los apuros de Narciso (1940)
- Odio (Hate) (1940)
- Cantinflas ruletero (1940)
- El muerto murió (The dead man died) (1939)
- Every Madman to His Specialty (1939)
- La casa del ogro (1939)
- Cantinflas jengibre contra dinamita (1939)
- The Girl's Aunt (1938)
- Los millones de Chaflán (Chaflán's millions) (1938)

=== Television ===
- "Al rojo vivo" (1980)
- "Cancionera" (1980)
- "Honrarás a los tuyos" (1979)
- "Lágrimas negras" (1979)
- "La hora del silencio" (1978)
- "Mundo de juguete" (1974) ... Madre Superiora
- "La hiena" (1973)
- "Los hermanos coraje" (1972)
- "Una vez, un hombre" (1971)
- "Maldición de La Blonda" (1971)
- "El oficio mas antiguo del mundo" (1970)
- "Prohibido" (1970)
- "Mi amor por ti" (1969)
- "Engañame" (1967)
- "La dueña" (1966)
- "Alma de mi alma" (1965)
- "Puente de cristal" (1965)
- "La piel de Zapa" (1964)
- "Gabriela" (1964)
- "La madrastra" (1962)
- "Un rostro en el pasado" (1960)
