= Carlos Orellana =

Mexican actor, film director and screenwriter

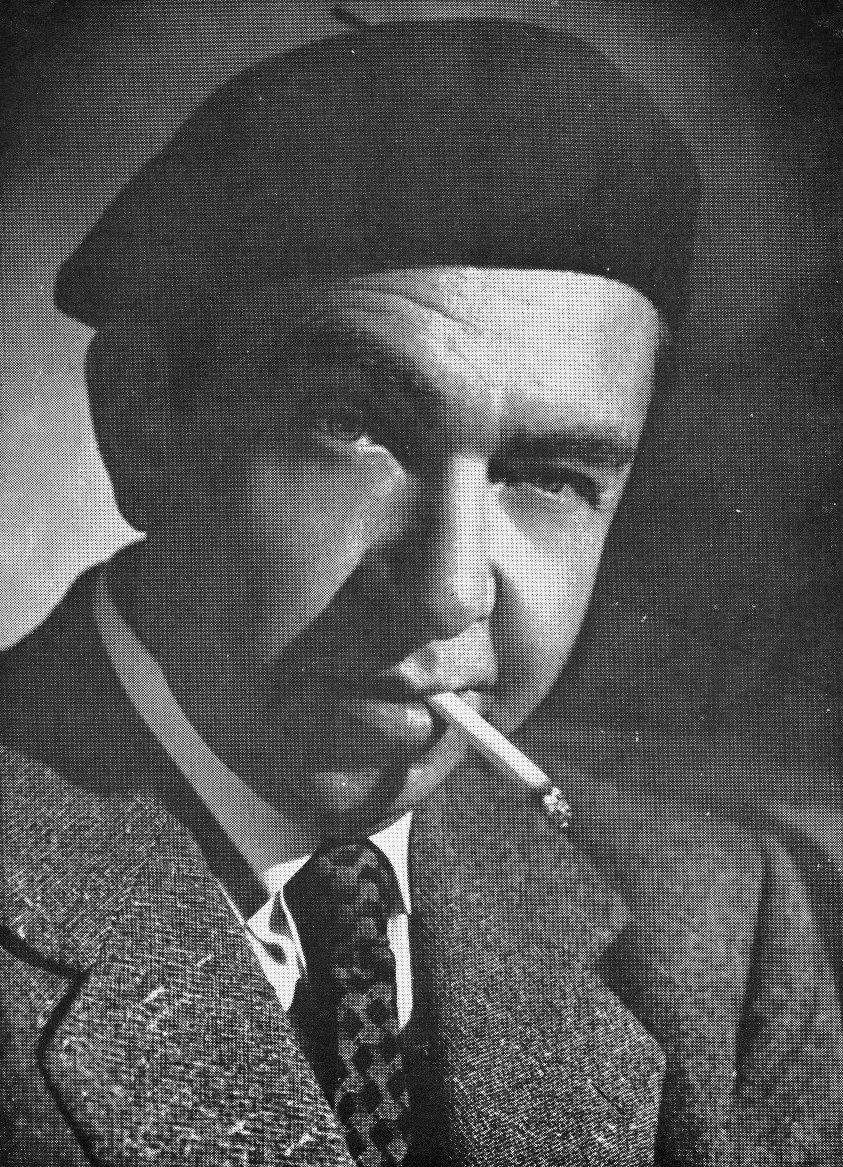
Carlos Orellana in 1954

Carlos Orellana Martínez (28 December 1900 in Hidalgo – 24 January 1960 in Mexico City) was a Mexican actor, film director and screenwriter.

== Filmography ==
=== As actor ===
- 1932: Santa - Hipólito
- 1933: El anónimo - Médico
- 1933: La Llorona - Mario - criado
- 1933: La noche del pecado
- 1934: Juárez y Maximiliano - Doctor Basch
- 1937: No te engañes corazón - Don Boni(facio) Bonafé
- 1937: La Paloma - Coronel Refugio Romero
- 1937: No basta ser madre
- 1938: Sucedió en La Habana
- 1938: El Rosario de Amozoc - Odilón
- 1938: El romance del palmar
- 1939: El capitán aventurero - Sgt. Carrasquilla
- 1939: El hotel de los chiflados - Administrador
- 1939: Three Peasants on a Donkey - Santiago Míguez
- 1939: Calumnia - Dr. Pietro
- 1939: Mujeres y toros
- 1939: El signo de la muerte - Dr. Gallardo
- 1940: Pobre diablo - Ponciano Luque
- 1940: La canción del milagro - Isaac
- 1940: Miente y serás feliz - Don Juan
- 1940: Borrasca humana
- 1940: El secreto de la monja - Don Diego de Carbajal
- 1941: Noche de recién casados
- 1941: Five Minutes of Love - Don Ataulfo
- 1942: Dos mexicanos en Sevilla
- 1942: Simón Bolívar - General José Antonio Páez
- 1942: The Eternal Secret - Don Justo
- 1943: Qué hombre tan simpático - Don Pancho
- 1943: Land of Passions - Salvador Peredo
- 1943: Arriba las mujeres - Laureano
- 1944: El herrero
- 1944: El pecado de una madre - Sargento Pedro Perdiguero
- 1944: The Escape - Neftali
- 1944: El intruso - La Valle
- 1944: Alma de bronce
- 1945: Amor prohibido - Don Pepe
- 1945: La hora de la verdad
- 1945: Escuadrón 201 - Don Matías
- 1945: La Casa de la zorra - Ancona
- 1946: Pepita Jiménez - Padre Belisario
- 1946: Crimen en la alcoba - Don Trinidad Rojas
- 1947: The Golden Boat - Tío Laureano
- 1947: The Three Garcias - Señor cura
- 1947: The Garcias Return - Señor cura
- 1948: Enrédate y verás - Farid
- 1949: Café de chinos - Señor Chang Chong
- 1950: Cuando los hijos odian - Tachito
- 1950: Anacleto Gets Divorced - Anacleto
- 1951: ¡... Y murió por nosotros! - Don Camilo, presidente municipal
- 1951: Get Your Sandwiches Here - Don Chente Mendoza
- 1952: Un Príncipe de la iglesia
- 1952: Cuando los hijos pecan
- 1953: Del rancho a la televisión - Don Cecilio Zárraga
- 1953: Dos tipos de cuidado - Don Elías
- 1953: Reportaje - Policeman
- 1954: Romance de fieras - Don Carlos Narváez
- 1954: Borrasca en las almas - Tío Bartolomé
- 1954: La Calle de los amores - Tío Alejo
- 1954: Maldita ciudad - Lucas
- 1955: Los Paquetes de Paquita - Orlando
- 1955: Cupido pierde a Paquita - don Severo
- 1955: Tú y las nubes
- 1956: Las medias de seda - Pretonio
- 1957: Tizoc: Amor Indio - Don Pancho García
- 1958: El Castillo de los monstruos - Don Melchor
- 1958: Bajo el cielo de México - Don Chavita, cobrador de taxes
- 1959: Dos corazones y un cielo - Don Atanasio Turrubiates (final film role)

=== As director ===
- 1941: Noche de recién casados
- 1942: Dos mexicanos en Sevilla
- 1942: El que tenga un amor
- 1942: The Eternal Secret
- 1943: ¡Arriba las mujeres!
- 1945: El Capitán Malacara
- 1945: Como México no hay dos!
- 1946: Cásate y verás
- 1946: Madman and Vagabond
- 1948: Enrédate y verás
- 1948: La casa de la Troya
- 1948: Flor de caña
- 1948: Mi esposa busca novio
- 1949: Cara sucia
- 1958: El gran premio
- 1960: Un trío de tres
