= Ismael Rodríguez =

Mexican film director

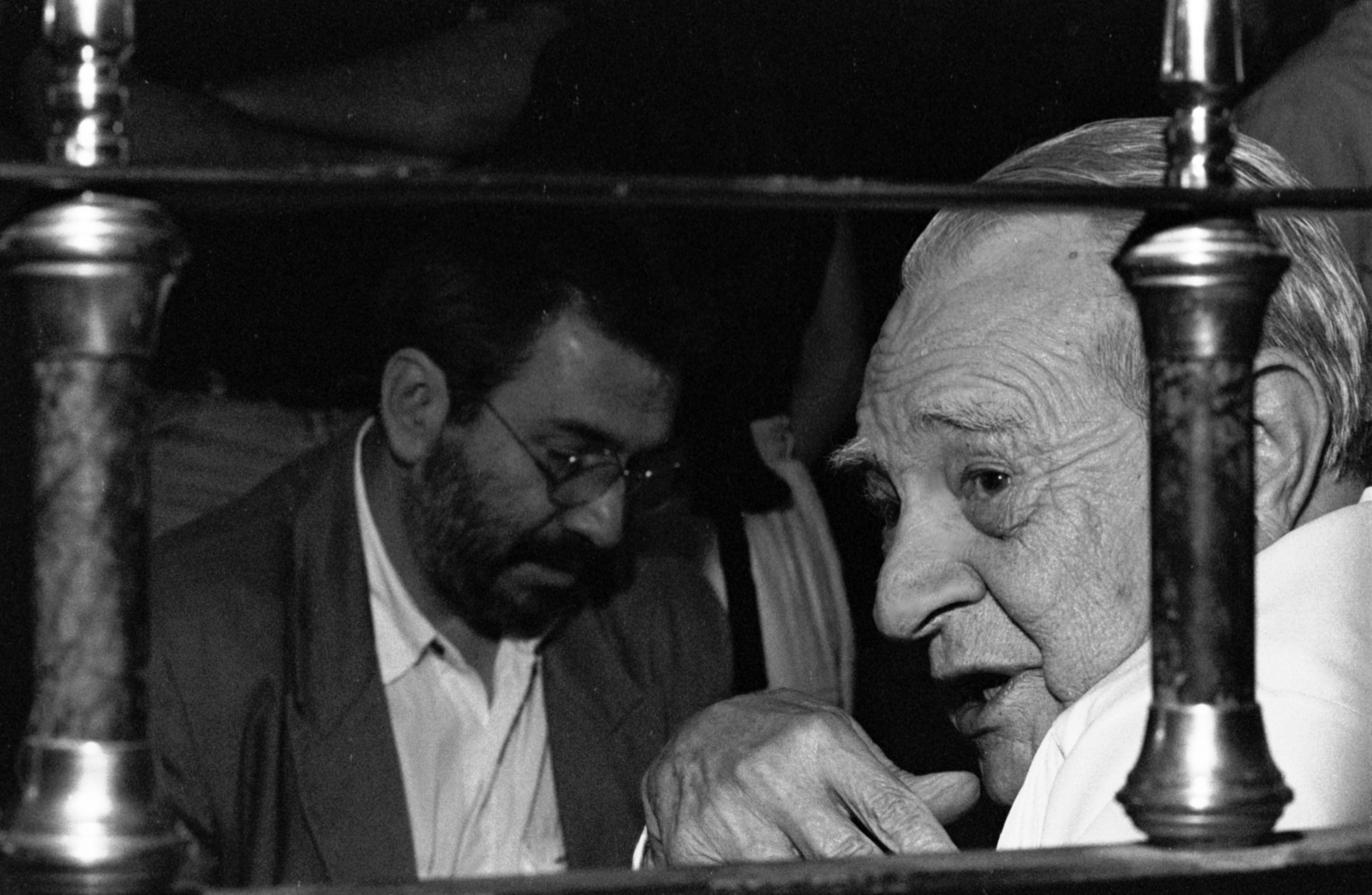
- Born: 19 October 1917; Mexico City, Mexico
- Died: 7 August 2004 (aged 86); Mexico City, Mexico
- Occupation: Film director
- Children: Ismael Rodríguez

Ismael Rodríguez (October 19, 1917 – August 7, 2004) was a Mexican film director.

Rodríguez rose to fame due to the movies he directed starring Pedro Infante, and directed many major stars, including Dolores del Río, María Félix, Toshiro Mifune, Jorge Negrete, Sara García, Luis Aguilar, Tito Guízar, Gloria Marín, Carmelita González, Antonio Aguilar, Columba Domínguez and Flor Silvestre. He directed the film Ánimas Trujano (1961) for which he was nominated for an Oscar for Best Foreign Language Film.

Rodríguez's most renowned international film is Tizoc, in which Pedro Infante starred alongside María Félix. For this role, Infante won the Silver Bear for Best Actor at the 7th Berlin International Film Festival.

He died on 7 August 2004 at the age of 87.

== Selected filmography ==
Film
Year	Title	Notes
1965	El niño y el muro	
1963	The Paper Man	
1962	Ánimas Trujano	
1961	Los Hermanos Del Hierro	
1960	To Each His Life	
1959	The Soldiers of Pancho Villa	
1957	Tizoc	
1956	Daniel Boone, Trail Blazer	
1954	Romance de fieras	
1954	Borrasca en las almas	
1954	Maldita ciudad	
1953	Pepe El Toro	
1953	Dos tipos de cuidado	
1951	What Has That Woman Done to You?	
1951	Full Speed Ahead	
1951	A.T.M. A toda máquina!	
1951	My General's Women	
1951	Kill Me Because I'm Dying!	
1950	Over the Waves	
1950	You Shall Not Covet Thy Son's Wife	
1949	The Black Sheep	
1948	Nosotros los Pobres	
1948	Los tres huastecos	
1948	Ustedes los ricos	
1947	The Three Garcias	
1947	The Garcias Return	
1947	Chachita from Triana	
1943	Mexicanos, al grito de guerra	
