= List of Mexican films of the 1930s =

A list of films produced in the Cinema of Mexico in the 1930s, ordered by year of release, from the year 1930 to 1939. For an alphabetical list of articles on Mexican films see Category:Mexican films.

== 1930s ==
Title	Director	Cast	Genre	Notes
1930
¡Que viva México!	Sergei Eisenstein		Historical Drama	An unfinished epic by Sergei Eisenstein, with later footage assembled into a truncated version.
1931
1932
El anónimo	Fernando de Fuentes	Gloria Iturbe, Carlos Orellana	Drama	
Santa	Antonio Moreno	Lupita Tovar, Juan José Martínez Casado	Melodrama	First Mexican sound film. Based on Federico Gamboa's novel.
Una vida por otra	John H. Auer	Nancy Torres, Julio Villarreal	Drama	
Zitari	Miguel Contreras Torres	Medea de Novara		
1933
La llorona	Ramón Peón	Ramón Pereda, Virginia Zuri, Adriana Lamar	Horror	Based on the legend of a grieving woman turned vengeful spirit, it was the first Mexican horror film with sound.
La calandria	Fernando de Fuentes	Carmen Guerrero		
En la cima del mundo	Roberto Ricardo	Juan Carlos Diego, Virginia Zuri, Paloma Christol		
La noche del pecado		Carlos Orellana		
El prisionero trece	Fernando de Fuentes			
Revolución	Miguel Contreras Torres	Miguel Contreras Torres, Luis G. Barreiro		
Sagrario	Ramón Peón	Ramón Pereda, Adriana Lamar and Julio Villarreal		
El tigre de Yautepec	Fernando de Fuentes			
Sobre las olas	Miguel Zacarías	Adolfo Girón, Carmen Guerrero, René Cardona		

== 1934 ==
Title	Director	Cast	Genre	Notes
Cruz Diablo	Fernando de Fuentes			
El fantasma del convento	Fernando de Fuentes	Enrique del Campo, Marta Roel, Carlos Villatoro, Victorio Blanco		
Godfather Mendoza	Fernando de Fuentes	Alfredo del Diestro, Carmen Guerrero, Antonio R. Frausto, Luis G. Barreiro, Joaquin Busquets, Emma Roldán	Historical	Set during the Mexican Revolution, with elements of Mexican noir.
Juarez and Maximilian	Miguel Contreras Torres	Medea de Novara, Enrique Herrera, Antonio R. Frausto		
Oro y plata	Ramón Peón	Carmen Guerrero, Adolfo Girón, Alfredo del Diestro		
Two Monks	Juan Bustillo Oro	Víctor Urruchúa, Carlos Villatoro, Magda Haller, M. Beltrán de Heder, Emma Roldán	Gothic Drama with elements of Psychological horror	Explores the emotional and moral conflict of two monks who fall in love with the same woman.
La sangre manda	José Bohr	José Bohr, Virginia Fábregas		
El pulpo humano		Sara García		
¡Viva México!		Sara García		
Janitzio	Carlos Navarro	Emilio Fernández, María Teresa Orozco, Gilberto González, Felipe de Flores, Max Langler, Adela Valdés		
Mujeres sin alma	Ramón Peón	Consuelo Moreno, Alberto Martí, Juan Orol, Adela Sequeyro, Francisco Jambrina, Mercedes Moreno, Luis G. Barreiro		
¿Quién mató a Eva?	José Bohr	José Bohr, Julio Villarreal, Miguel M. Delgado, Josefina Velez		
The Woman of the Port	Arcady Boytler	Andrea Palma, Domingo Soler, Stella Inda	Drama	Inspired in the novel Le Port
El vuelo de la muerte	Guillermo Calles	Ramón Pereda, Sara García, Adriana Lamar	Drama and Crime	Centered around a woman who becomes entangled in a dangerous situation involving crime and betrayal.

== 1935 ==
Title	Director	Cast	Genre	Notes
Heroic Silence	Ramón Peón	Alfredo del Diestro, Emma Roldán, René Cardona	Drama	
Luponini (El terror de Chicago)	José Bohr	José Bohr, Anita Blanch, Carlos Villatoro, Isabelita Blanch, Maruja Gómez, Raúl Talán, Manuel Buendía, Arturo Manrique "Panseco"	Police Drama	
Sueño de amor	José Bohr	Claudio Arrau, Julieta Palavicini, Consuelo Frank, Elena D'Orgaz		
Más allá de la muerte	Adela Sequeyro	Adela Sequeyro, Miguel Arenas, Mario Tenorio, Magda Haller, Jorge Cardeña Álvarez, Manuel Noriega, Manuel Buendía		
Madre Querida	Juan Orol	Luisa María Morales, Alberto Martí, Antonio Licéaga, Juan Orol	Drama	
Martín Garatuza	Gabriel Soria	Leopoldo Ortín, Juan José Martínez Casado, Sofía Álvarez	Historical	A cunning man navigating betrayal and power in colonial Mexico.
The Mystery of the Ghastly Face	Juan Bustillo Oro	Carlos Villarías, Beatriz Ramos, Manuel Noriega	Mystery Horror	Centered around a chilling mystery involving a ghostly, pale-faced figure.
Rosario	Miguel Zacarias	Pedro Armendáriz, Gloria Morel, Fanny Schiller	Drama	Story of a young woman's emotional struggles as she faces love, sacrifice, and societal pressures.
La familia Dressel	Fernando de Fuentes			
Sor Juana Inés de la Cruz	Ramón Peón	Andrea Palma, Mimi Derba		

== 1936 ==
Title	Director	Cast	Genre	Notes
Allá en el Rancho Grande	Fernando de Fuentes	Tito Guízar, Esther Fernández	Musical comedy and ranchera genre.	Considered to be the one that started the Golden Age of Mexican Cinema.
Así es la mujer	José Bohr	José Bohr, Barry Norton, René Cardona, Sara García		
Desfile deportivo	Fernando de Fuentes			
Irma la mala	Raphael J. Sevilla	Pedro Armendáriz, Adriana Lamar, Ramón Pereda		
Juan Pistolas	Roberto Curwood	Raúl de Anda, Lucha Ruanova, Javier de la Parra		
Judas	Manuel R. Ojeda	Josefina Escobedo, Carlos Villatoro, Víctor Urruchúa		
María Elena	Raphael J. Sevilla	Pedro Armendáriz, Emilio Fernández		
Malditas sean las mujeres		Adriana Lamar, Ramón Pereda		
Marihuana (El monstruo verde)		Sara García		
Mujeres de hoy	Ramón Peón	Adriana Lamar, Ramón Pereda, Victoria Blanco	Comedy drama	
Petróleo	Fernando de Fuentes			
Redes	Fred Zinnemann	Silvio Hernández, David Valle González, Rafael Hinojosa, Antonio Lara, Miguel Figueroa	Drama and Social Realism film	Film about a fishing community's struggle against exploitation. Employing a non-professional cast and neorealist techniques.
Vámonos con Pancho Villa	Fernando de Fuentes	Fernando Soler, Pedro Armendàriz	Historical Drama	Depicts the Mexican Revolution through the eyes of soldiers who accompany the legendary bandit Pancho Villa.

== 1937 ==
Title	Director	Cast	Genre	Notes
No te engañes corazón	Miguel Contreras Torres	Cantinflas, Carlos Orellana, Sara García, Estanislao Schillinsky	Comedy Drama	First Cantinflas film
Bajo el cielo de México	Fernando de Fuentes	David Silva		
La paloma	Miguel Contreras Torres	Arturo de Córdova, Medea de Novara, Alfredo del Diestro		
Come on Ponciano	Gabriel Soria	Consuelo Frank, Leopoldo Ortín, Carlos López	Historical Drama and Comedy	Follows the story of a man named Ponciano, who becomes involved in the turmoil and struggles of the Mexican Revolution.
Heads or Tails	Arcady Boytler	Mario Moreno (Cantinflas), Manuel Medel, Margarita Mora	Drama Comedy	Explores themes of nationalism and social conflict in post-revolutionary Mexico.
¡Esos hombres!	Rolando Aguilar	Adriana Lamar, Arturo de Córdova and Marina Tamayo		
La honradez es un estorbo	Juan Bustillo Oro	Leopoldo Ortín, Gloria Morel		
Las mujeres mandan	Fernando de Fuentes	Alfredo del Diestro, Marina Tamayo, Sara García		
La Mancha de Sangre	Adolfo Best Maugard	Estela Inda		
No basta ser madre		Carlos Orellana, Sara García		
Jalisco nunca pierde	Chano Urueta	Pedro Armendáriz, Esperanza Baur, Jorge Vélez, Rosita Lepe	Comedy	
Las cuatro milpas	Ramón Pereda	Pedro Armendáriz, Ramón Pereda, Adriana Lamar		
No matarás (Suprema ley)	Miguel Contreras Torres	Adriana Lamar, Ramón Pereda		Co-production with the United States
Nobody's Wife	Adela Sequeyro	Mario Tenorio, José Eduardo Pérez, Eduardo González Pliego	Drama	Exploring themes of love and societal expectations.
Poppy of the Road	Juan Bustillo Oro, Antonio Guzmán Aguilera	Tito Guizar, Andrea Palma, Pedro Armendáriz,	Musical drama, with elements of romance	Tells the story of a young woman’s struggles with love, betrayal, and her journey toward self-discovery.
Such Is My Country	Arcady Boytler	Cantinflas, Manuel Medel, Mercedes Soler	Comedy	Mexican comedy film that humorously portrays the customs and culture of Mexico, reflecting the country's identity during the era.
Ave sin rumbo	Roberto O'Quigley	Andrea Palma, Armando Calvo		
Águila o sol	Arcady Boytler	Cantinflas, Manuel Medel	Drama with elements of family and reunion	Polito Sol and siblings Adriana and Carmelo Águila are abandoned at birth, growing up as the "Águila o Sol" trio. Years later, Polito's father, Don Hipólito, finds them and reunites the family.

== 1938 ==
Title	Director	Cast	Genre	Notes
La golondrina	Miguel Contreras Torres	Miguel Contreras Torres, Medea de Novara, Domingo Soler		
Beautiful Mexico	Ramón Pereda	Adriana Lamar, Antonio R. Frausto	Musical	Portrays the beauty and culture of Mexico through a heartfelt story of love and national pride.
Diablillos de arrabal	Adela Sequeyro	José Emilio Pineda, Enrique Olivar, Alberto Islas, Antonio Mendoza Botello, Parkev Hussian, Saúl Zamora, Arturo Amaro	Comedy	
The Girl's Aunt	Juan Bustillo Oro	Enrique Herrera, Joaquín Pardavé, Gloria Marín	Comedy	
Huapango	Juan Bustillo Oro	Gloria Morel, Enrique Herrera, Antonio R. Frausto	Musical	
Los millones de Chaflán		Pedro Armendáriz		
La Zandunga	Fernando de Fuentes	Lupe Vélez, Arturo de Córdova		
Mi candidato		Pedro Armendáriz, Esther Fernández		
Canto a mi tierra	José Bohr	Pedro Armendáriz, Pedro Vargas		
La Adelita Sabino Estrada		Pedro Armendáriz		
Siboney	Juan Orol	María Antonieta Pons, Juan Orol		
While Mexico Sleeps	Alejandro Galindo	Arturo de Córdova, Gloria Morel, Miguel Arenas	Crime	
Dos cadetes	René Cardona	Sara García, Fernando Soler		
El hotel de los chiflados		Carlos Orellana		
El rosario de Amozoc	José Bohr	Lupita Tovar, Carlos Orellana, Emilio Tuero		
Padre de más de cuatro		Sara García		
Perjura	Raphael J. Sevilla	Sara García		
Pescadores de perlas		Sara García		
Por mis pistolas	José Bohr	Sara García		
Su adorable majadero		Sara García		
Sucedió en La Habana	Ramón Peón	Luana Alcañiz, Juan Torena, Rita Montaner, Carlos Orellana		
La tía de las muchachas	Juan Bustillo Oro	Enrique Herrera, Joaquín Pardavé and Gloria Marín		

== 1939 ==
Title	Director	Cast	Genre	Notes
Café Concordia	Alberto Gout	Janet Alcoriza, David Silva, Tomás Perrín	Drama	
Every Madman to His Specialty	Juan Bustillo Oro	Enrique Herrera, Joaquín Pardavé, Gloria Marín	Comedy mystery	
Father's Entanglements	Miguel Zacarías	Leopoldo Ortín, Sara García, Julián Soler	Comedy	
Horse for Horse	Juan Bustillo Oro	Joaquín Pardavé, Consuelo Frank, Enrique Herrera	Comedy	
El indio	Armando Vargas de la Maza	Pedro Armendáriz, Consuelo Frank, Dolores Camarillo	Drama	
The Night of the Mayas	Chano Urueta	Isabela Corona, Arturo de Córdova, Stella Inda	Drama	
The Queen of the River	René Cardona	Domingo Soler, Pedro Armendáriz, Gloria Morel	Drama	
The Sign of Death	Chano Urueta	Cantinflas, Manuel Medel, Elena D'Orgaz	Mystery	
Three Peasants on a Donkey	José Benavides	Carlos Orellana, Sara García, Joaquín Pardavé	Comedy	
With Villa's Veterans	Raúl de Anda	Domingo Soler, Pedro Armendáriz, Emilio Fernández	War drama	
Una luz en mi camino		Pedro Armendáriz		
La china Hilaria	Roberto Curwood	Pedro Armendáriz, Alicia Ortiz		
Calumnia	Francisco Elías Riquelme	Carlos Orellana		
In the Times of Don Porfirio	Juan Bustillo Oro	Fernando Soler, Marina Tamayo, Emilio Tuero, Joaquín Pardavé	Musical	
Mujeres y toros		Carlos Orellana		
Papacito lindo	Fernando de Fuentes	Sara García, Fernando Soler, Julián Soler, Manuel Noriega, Manolita Saval		
El capitán aventurero	Arcady Boytler	Carlos Orellana, José Mojica, Manolita Saval		
The Cemetery of the Eagles	Luis Lezama	Jorge Negrete, Margarita Mora and José Macip		
The Coward	René Cardona	Julián Soler, Adria Delhort, Josefina Escobedo		
The House of the Ogre	Fernando de Fuentes			
The Whip	José Bohr	José Bohr, Elena D'Orgaz, Domingo Soler		
