= List of Mexican films of 1941 =

This is a list of the films produced in Mexico in 1941, ordered alphabetically. (see 1941 in film):

== 1941 ==
Title	Director	Cast	Genre	Notes
1941
Creo en Dios	Fernando de Fuentes			
Cuando los hijos se van	Juan Bustillo Oro	Fernando Soler, Joaquín Pardavé, Sara García	Drama	
Five Minutes of Love	Alfonso Patiño Gómez	Arturo de Córdova, Mapy Cortés, Carlos Orellana	Comedy	
La isla de la pasión	Emilio Fernández	Pedro Armendáriz, Isabela Corona, Pituka de Foronda		First Emilio Fernandez film
The League of Songs	Chano Urueta	Ramón Armengod, Mapy Cortés, Domingo Soler	Musical comedy	
Neither Blood nor Sand	Alejandro Galindo	Cantinflas, Susana Guízar, Pedro Armendáriz	Comedy	
The 9.15 Express	Alejandro Galindo	Virginia Fábregas, Alfredo del Diestro, Gloria Marín	Drama	
El barbero prodigioso	Fernando Soler	Fernando Soler, Adriana Lamar, Domingo Soler		
¡Ay, Jalisco, no te rajes!	Joselito Rodríguez	Jorge Negrete, Gloria Marín		
Hasta que llovió en Sayula	Miguel Contreras Torres	Carlos López Chaflan, Emma Roldán, Amparo Arozamena		
La epopeya del camino	Francisco Elías	Pedro Armendáriz, María Luisa Zea, Dolores Camarillo		
Oh, What Times, Don Simon!	Julio Bracho	Joaquín Pardavé, Arturo de Córdova, Mapy Cortés	Musical comedy	
To the Sound of the Marimba	Juan Bustillo Oro	Sara García, Fernando Soler, Marina Tamayo	Musical	
The Unknown Policeman	Miguel M. Delgado	Cantinflas, Mapy Cortés, Gloria Marín		
La Torre de los suplicios		Luis Alcoriza		
La gallina clueca	Fernando de Fuentes			
Noche de recién casados		Carlos Orellana		
The Priest's Secret	Joselito Rodríguez	Arturo de Córdova, Alicia de Phillips, Pedro Armendáriz	Drama	
