= Manuel Dondé =

Mexican film actor

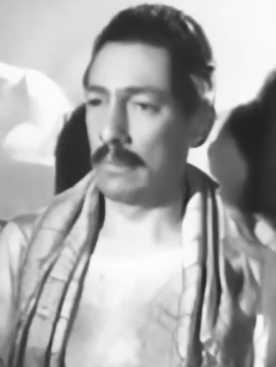
- Dondé in Canaima (1945)
- Born: 5 June 1906; Campeche, Mexico
- Died: 27 May 1976 (aged 69); Mexico
- Occupation: Actor
- Years active: 1933-1976 (film)

Manuel Dondé (1906 – 27 May 1976) was a Mexican film actor. He frequently played villains during his long film career.

== Selected filmography ==
- La llorona (1933)
- Soulless Women (1934) - Policía
- El bastardo (1937)
- The Blood Stain (1937)
- El derecho y el deber (1938) - Antonio
- The Girl's Aunt (1938) - Lechero
- The Coward (1939) - Minor Role (uncredited)
- The Cemetery of the Eagles (1939) - Sirviente (uncredited)
- La China Hilaria (1939) - Pueblerino (uncredited)
- Hombres del aire (1939)
- Los olvidados de Dios (1940) - Presidiario
- Los de abajo (1940) - Soldado federal deserter (uncredited)
- Allá en el trópico (1940)
- El charro Negro (1940) - Hombre en cantina (uncredited)
- El jefe máximo (1940)
- Hombre o demonio (1940)
- Con su amable permiso (1940) - Empleado del periódico (uncredited)
- El Zorro de Jalisco (1941) - Chofer (uncredited)
- Creo en Dios (1941)
- Neither Blood nor Sand (1941) - Miembro cuadrilla (uncredited)
- Adios mi chaparrita (1941) - Vaquero
- The 9.15 Express (1941) - Don Rodrigo (uncredited)
- Amor chinaco (1941)
- The Unknown Policeman (1941) - Amigo vagabundo (uncredited)
- La gallina clueca (1941) - Empleado de Ángel (uncredited)
- ¿Quién te quiere a tí? (1942) - Amigo de Milagros (uncredited)
- El barbero prodigioso (1942) - Pueblerino (uncredited)
- Allá en el bajio (1942) - (uncredited)
- Jesús de Nazareth (1942) - Testigo contra Jesús (uncredited)
- Silk, Blood and Sun (1942) - Espectador estadio (uncredited)
- El conde de Montecristo (1942) - (uncredited)
- Virgen de medianoche (1942)
- Caballería del imperio (1942)
- Simón Bolívar (1942) - Piar
- La venganza del Charro Negro (1942) - Hombre en cantina (uncredited)
- Los tres mosqueteros (1942) - Capitán (uncredited)
- The Saint Who Forged a Country (1942) - Sr. Azteca (uncredited)
- The Rock of Souls (1943) - Macario
- The Circus (1943) - (uncredited)
- La posada sangrienta (1943) - Orejano, mesero (uncredited)
- Morenita clara (1943) - Roque, mayordomo
- Wild Flower (1943) - Úrsulo Torres
- Land of Passions (1943) - Rebelde (uncredited)
- Santa (1943) - Cliente burdel (uncredited)
- El misterioso señor Marquina (1943)
- Doña Bárbara (1943) - Carmelito López
- Lightning in the South (1943) - Valerio Trujano
- El hombre de la máscara de hierro (1943)
- Another Dawn (1943) - Gunman
- A Letter of Love (1943) - Soldado
- Divorced (1943) - Abogado
- Caminito alegre (1944) - Señor (uncredited)
- La vida inútil de Pito Pérez (1944) - Capitán (uncredited)
- Michael Strogoff (1944) - Tártaro
- Como todas las madres (1944)
- La corte de faraón (1944)
- Balajú (1944)
- El rey se divierte (1944)
- Rosa de las nieves (1944)
- Sota, caballo y rey (1944) - Tuerto
- Amok (1944) - Indigena (uncredited)
- Entre hermanos (1945)
- Nosotros (1945) - Marcelo (uncredited)
- Corazones de México (1945)
- Canaima (1945) - Cauchero (uncredited)
- La pajarera (1945) - Charol
- A Day with the Devil (1945)
- Caminos de sangre (1945) - Pedro Gómez (uncredited)
- La selva de fuego (1945) - Tuxpeño
- Symphony of Life (1946)
- Su última aventura (1946) - Hombre pelea con Raúl (uncredited)
- El ahijado de la muerte (1946) - José
- La Otra (1946) - Aguilar, policía
- Enamorada (1946) - Fidel Bernal
- Cuando lloran los valientes (1947) - Soldado
- Mujer (1947) - Detective policía (uncredited)
- Los cristeros (1947) - (uncredited)
- The Treasure of the Sierra Madre (1948) - El Jefe
- Río Escondido (1948) - El Rengo, esbirro de Regino
- El muchacho alegre (1948) - Sabino
- Algo flota sobre el agua (1948) - El zurdo
- Revenge (1948) - Gilberto Acosta
- Maclovia (1948) - Comisario (uncredited)
- Se la llevó el Remington (1948) - Santos
- Hermoso ideal (1948) - Charro (uncredited)
- La norteña de mis amores (1948)
- La vorágine (1949)
- Midnight (1949) - Melquiades
- Ahí viene Vidal Tenorio (1949)
- Pueblerina (1949) - Rómulo
- Rayito de luna (1949) - Tuerto
- The Unloved Woman (1949) - Juez de acordada
- El rencor de la tierra (1949)
- Callejera (1949) - Fidel Juárez
- La posesión (1950) - Don Santiago, presidente municipal
- Cuatro contra el mundo (1950) - El Lagarto
- La mujer que yo amé (1950) - Cliente cantina
- The Dangerous Age (1950) - Pedro Martínez
- Tacos joven (1950)
- El Cristo de mi Cabecera (1951) - Santiago
- Bodas de fuego (1951) - Panfilo
- María Montecristo (1951) - Lic. Suárez
- They Say I'm a Communist (1951) - Camarada Palomera
- El Suavecito (1951) - Esbirro del nene
- Todos son mis hijos!... (1951) - Román
- Con todo el corazón (1952) - Señor Ramírez
- Dos caras tiene el destino (1952) - Chiclero enfermo
- The Martyr of Calvary (1952) - Lázaro
- Passionflower (1952) - Prisionero
- Mexican Bus Ride (1952) - Eladio González
- Carne de presidio (1952) - El llorón
- Por ellas aunque mal paguen (1952) - El Cacomixtle
- El genial Detective Peter Pérez (1952)
- El cuarto cerrado (1952)
- Misericordia (1953) - Yuco
- Él (1953) - Pablo
- Frontera norte (1953)
- La Perversa (1954) - Fiscal
- Reto a la vida (1954) - Empleado (uncredited)
- Garden of Evil (1954) - Cantina Waiter (uncredited)
- El joven Juárez (1954) - Tío Bernardino
- La entrega (1954) - Doctor Medina (uncredited)
- Si volvieras a mi (1954)
- The River and Death (1954) - Zósimo Anguiano
- ¡Vaya tipos! (1955)
- El pueblo sin Dios (1955) - Jugador
- La mujer X (1955) - Leonardo
- La vida no vale nada (1955) - Carmelo
- The Criminal Life of Archibaldo de la Cruz (1955) - Colonel at wedding
- Secreto profesional (1955) - Ernesto
- Drop the Curtain (1955) - Detective de policía (uncredited)
- Los tres Villalobos (1955) - El tuerto
- The Last Frontier (1955) - Red Cloud (uncredited)
- La culpa de los hombres (1955) - Lorenzo
- El fantasma de la casa roja (1956) - Pedro Satan, administrador
- Los gavilanes (1956) - Esbirro asesina a José María
- The Hidden One (1956) - Tuerto (uncredited)
- Death in the Garden (1956) - Telegraph operator (uncredited)
- Policías y ladrones (1956) - Esbirro de chocholoco
- Amor y pecado (1956) - Agustín, padre Miguel
- La huella del chacal (1956) - (uncredited)
- Encrucijada (1956)
- Las medias de seda (1956) - Capataz
- Los amantes (1956)
- Juventud desenfrenada (1956) - Abortionista
- Legítima defensa (1957) - Agente ministerio público II
- Asesinos de la noche (1957) - El chueco
- Morir de pie (1957)
- The New World (1957)
- Swamp of the Lost Souls (1957) - Don Nacho Mendoza
- La justicia del gavilán vengador (1957)
- Secuestro diabolico (1957)
- Tu hijo debe nacer (1958) - Pedro, chofer
- Cabaret trágico (1958) - Mesero
- El látigo negro' (1958) - El Moncho
- Un vago sin oficio (1958)
- El rayo de Sinaloa (La venganza de Heraclio Bernal) (1958) - Gonzalo Cárdenas
- La rebelión de la sierra (1958) - Gonzalo Landeros
- Raffles (1958) - Don Teófilo (uncredited)
- La odalisca No. 13 (1958) - (uncredited)
- El hombre que logró ser invisible (1958)
- Pulgarcito (1958) - Matías
- Ando volando bajo (1959)
- México nunca duerme (1959) - Caimán
- Sonatas (1959) - Campesino
- Los Tigres del ring (1960)
- El tesoro de Chucho el Roto (1960) - Federico Hinojosa
- Calibre 44 (1960) - Pancho, bandido (uncredited)
- Macario (1960) - Enviado de la inquisicion (uncredited)
- El impostor (1960) - Esbirro de Navarro
- El toro negro (1960) - Presidente municipal
- Luciano Romero (1960) - El tuerto, esbirro de Heraclio
- El gato (1961)
- Ellas también son rebeldes (1961) - Agente policía
- Limosneros con garrote (1961) - Dueño de patín de ruedas
- En carne propia (1961) - Velador ladrón
- Ay Chabela...! (1961)
- Juana Gallo (1961) - General Antonio Dávila (uncredited)
- Suicídate mi amor (1961) - Señor juez
- The Curse of Nostradamus (1961) - Dr. Camarena
- Escuela de valientes (1961) - Hombre en cantina (uncredited)
- Barú, el hombre de la selva (1962)
- Martín Santos el llanero (1962)
- Qué perra vida (1962) - El Picaflectos (uncredited)
- Espiritismo (1962) - Espiritualista (uncredited)
- Nostradamus y el destructor de monstruos (1962) - Miembro de la comisión (uncredited)
- El centauro del norte (1962)
- La moneda rota (1962)
- Cazadores de asesinos (1962) - (uncredited)
- La pantera de Monte Escondido (1962) - (uncredited)
- Los falsos héroes (1962)
- ¡En peligro de muerte! (1962) - Indio
- Genii of Darkness (1962) - Dr. Camarena
- Tlayucan (1962) - Mendigo ciego
- La sangre de Nostradamus (1962) - Dr. Camarena (uncredited)
- Dos gallos y dos gallinas (1963)
- Santo contra el cerebro diabólico (1963) - Carlos
- Sangre en la barranca (1963)
- Qué bonito es querer (1963)
- El beso de ultratumba (1963) - Doctor Mariscal
- El hombre de papel (1963) - (uncredited)
- México de mis recuerdos (1963) - Mayordomo
- Herencia maldita (1963) - Esbirro de Carlos
- Las bravuconas (1963)
- Un tipo a todo dar (1963) - Julio
- Torero por un día (1963)
- El río de las ánimas (1964) - El tuerto
- Furia en el Edén (1964)
- Frente al destino (1964)
- El Espadachín (1964)
- Wrestling Women vs. the Aztec Mummy (1964) - Dependiente de hotel (uncredited)
- The Golden Cockerel (1964) - Don Perfecto (uncredited)
- La edad de piedra (1964) - Spy
- El último cartucho (1965)
- El pueblo fantasma (1965) - Alejo, comisario
- Las lobas del ring (1965) - Arena Employee (uncredited)
- Rio Hondo (1965) - (uncredited)
- El rescate (1965)
- La conquista de El Dorado (1965)
- Mar sangriento (1965)
- Amor de adolescente (1965) - Vendedor de fotos
- Alma llanera (1965)
- Santo vs el estrangulador (1965) - Policía encubierto
- Los reyes del volante (1965) - (uncredited)
- Black Wind (1965) - Tata Lupe
- La Valentina (1966) - Revolucionario en el cementerio (uncredited)
- Tierra de violencia (1966)
- Espectro del estrangulador (1966)
- Duelo de pistoleros (1966)
- Los Sánchez deben morir (1966) - Cantinero
- Pacto de sangre (1966)
- Tiempo de morir (1966) - Barber
- Alazán y enamorado (1966) - Señor juez
- Cargamento prohibido (1966) - Don Pablo (uncredited)
- Juan Pistolas (1966)
- El indomable (1966) - (uncredited)
- La cigüeña distraída (1966) - Policia (uncredited)
- Los perversos (1967) - Tio de Tony (uncredited)
- Crisol (1967)
- La leyenda del bandido (1967) - Pancho
- Alma Grande en el desierto (1967)
- Nuestros buenos vecinos de Yucatán (1967) - Doctor
- El silencioso (1967) - Cantinero
- Mujeres, mujeres, mujeres (1967) - (segment "Amor y yoga")
- Operacion 67' (1967) - Police detective
- El escapulario (1968) - Gendarme
- Bajo el imperio del hampa (1968)
- Lucio Vázquez (1968) - Campesino en charreada (uncredited)
- La noche del halcón (1968) - Camilo
- La endemoniada (1968) - Doctor
- Blue Demon destructor de espias (1968) - (uncredited)
- Valentín de la Sierra (1968) - Sargento Paredes (uncredited)
- Los asesinos (1968) - Hombre asesinado
- El caballo Bayo (1969)
- Night of the Bloody Apes (1969) - Doctor (uncredited)
- No juzgarás a tus padres (1969)
- Memories of the Future (1969) - Félix
- El Libro de piedra (1969) - Bruno
- Una noche bajo la tormenta (1969)
- El ojo de vidrio (1969) - Catalino Zúñiga
- Mujeres de medianoche (1969) - Cura de pueblo (uncredited)
- Cazadores de espías (1969)
- Los siete proscritos (1969) - Jugador
- El último pistolero (1969)
- Estafa de amor (1970)
- La captura de Gabino Barrera (1970)
- Su precio... unos dólares (1970)
- La rebelion de las hijas (1970)
- La venganza de Gabino Barrera (1971)
- Para servir a usted (1971) - Grajales
- Jesús, nuestro Señor (1971) - (uncredited)
- Siete Evas para un Adan (1971) - Juez
- La casa del farol rojo (1971) - Agente policía (uncredited)
- Los Beverly de Peralvillo (1971) - El Tuerto (uncredited)
- El negocio del odio (1972)
- Tacos al carbón (1972) - Jefe de taller mecánico (uncredited)
- Tonta, tonta, pero no tanto (1972) - Tata Cruz
- ¡Qué familia tan cotorra! (1973) - Cliente restaurante (uncredited)
- Las cautivas (1973)
- The Holy Mountain (1973) - Wanderer (uncredited)
- Diamantes, oro, y amor (1973) - Señor juez
- Capulina contra las momias (El terror de Guanajuato) (1973) - El muerto
- Uno y medio contra el mundo (1973)
- Poor But Honest (1973) - Publicista (uncredited)
- El primer amor (1974)
- La muerte de Pancho Villa (1974)
- Los leones del ring contra la Cosa Nostra (1974) - (uncredited)
- Rapiña (1975) - Papá de Porfidio
- The Bricklayer (1975) - Velador (uncredited)
- De todos modos Juan te llamas (1976)
- Alucarda (1977) - Wagon Driver
- Cuartelazo (1977) - Jesús Fernández, boticario (final film role)
