= Conchita Gentil Arcos =

Mexican actress

- Born: 1897; Valencia, Spain
- Died: 23 December 1982 (aged 84–85); Mexico
- Other names: Concepción Gentil Arcos; Concha Gentil Arcos; C. Gentil Arcos; Conchita G. Arcos
- Occupation: Actress
- Spouse: Guillermo Haller
- Children: Magda, Conzuelo & Gloria Haller

Conchita Gentil Arcos (1897 – 23 December 1982) was a Mexican actress of the Golden Age of Mexican cinema as a character actress in supporting roles.

== Career ==
She was the sister of María Gentil Arcos, also an actress in the Golden Age of Mexican cinema; Conchita began her work as an actress in 1932, while María did not start her career until 1938. Conchita starred in comedies such as Mi viuda alegre ("My Cheerful Widow") in 1941 or Romeo and Juliet in 1943, as well as in Music, Poetry and Madness in 1947, as the dreamy and romantic aunt by Meche Barba's character, a fan of adventure novels that falls in love with Marcelo Chávez's character, or in The Lost Child, also in 1947, alongside Chávez and Germán Valdés. She also appeared as the usurer who flirts with Pedro Infante's character only to be murdered in Nosotros los Pobres in 1947.

The writer Carlos Monsiváis referred to her (alongside her sister María) as one of the "complementary faces" of Mexican cinema, writing, "After all, they are not many, but their years on the screen make them a tribe..."

== Selected filmography ==
- Una vida por otra (1932)
- La Llorona (1933) as Criada
- The Woman of the Port (1934) as Vecina
- Martín Garatuza (1935) as Catalina
- Poppy of the Road (1937) as Gerarda
- La Zandunga (1938) as Doña Mariquita (uncredited)
- Dos cadetes (1938) as Luz
- Beautiful Mexico (1938) as Doña Ángeles
- Three Peasants on a Donkey (1939) as Antonia Terruel
- Calumnia (1939) as Doña Refugio
- In the Times of Don Porfirio (1940) as Doña Julia
- Poor Devil (1940) as Blandina
- Miente y serás feliz (1940) as Doña Julita
- ¡Que viene mi marido! (1940) as Genoveva
- Here's the Point (1940) as Loretito
- El jefe máximo (1940)
- El secreto de la monja (1940) as Bereguela
- The 9.15 Express (1941) as Toñita, casera (uncredited)
- Simón Bolívar (1942) as Señora del Toro
- The Black Angel (1942) as Doña Meche
- ¡Así se quiere en Jalisco! (1942) as Doña Tula
- The Rock of Souls (1943) as Madame (as Concha Gentil Arcos)
- Land of Passions (1943) as Doña Albina (uncredited)
- Cinco fueron escogidos (1943) as Marfa
- The Rebel (1943) as Criada de don Pablo
- Romeo and Juliet (1943)
- Saint Francis of Assisi (1944)
- My Memories of Mexico (1944) as Tía Blandina
- Michael Strogoff (1944) as Mujer en tren
- Nana (1944) as Zoe
- Gran Hotel (1944) as Doña Estefania
- The Intruder (1944) (uncredited)
- Porfirio Díaz (1944)
- La trepadora (1944) as Cándida (uncredited)
- Alma de bronce (1944)
- El secreto de la solterona (1945) as Federica (as C. Gentil Arcos)
- Mischievous Susana (1945) as Clienta en zapateria
- The Museum of Crime (1945) as Clementina Cardoso de Ramos
- The Devourer (1946) as Jacinta
- El Superhombre (1946)
- Don't Marry My Wife (1947)
- Five Faces of Woman (1947) as Casera de Roberto (as Concha Gentil Arcos)
- The Lost Child (1947) as Pita Torre
- Nosotros los Pobres (1948) as La prestamista
- Music, Poetry and Madness (1948) as Doña Altagracia (as Conchita G. Arcos)
- El cuarto mandamiento (1948) as María Luisa Lucio, enfermera abortista (uncredited)
- A Family Like Many Others (1949) as Doña Jovita, invitada a fiesta (uncredited)
- Philip of Jesus (1949) as Invitada a recital (uncredited)
- Dos pesos dejada (1949) as Doña Refugio
- Confessions of a Taxi Driver (1949) as Doña Remedios
- Love for Love (1950) as Doña Lucecita
- Cuatro contra el mundo (1950) as Doña Trini
- Wife or Lover (1950)
- Rosauro Castro (1950) as Señora Campos
- The Doorman (1950) as Doña Cuca, vecina
- History of a Heart (1951) as Miembro educativo
- Daughter of Deceit (1951) as Toña García
- Woman Without Tears (1951) as Sarita (uncredited)
- Get Your Sandwiches Here (1951) as Manuelita
- The Atomic Fireman (1952) as Vecina de Guadalupe (uncredited)
- The Border Man (1952) as Tía Mechita
- My Adorable Savage (1952)
- Tropical Delirium (1952) as Doña Esperanza
- Neither Rich nor Poor (1953)
- Here Come the Freeloaders (1953) as Señora Correa del Toro Prieto (uncredited)
- Seven Women (1953)
- The Second Woman (1953) as Juliana
- The Photographer (1953) as Mamá de Chelito
- What Can Not Be Forgiven (1953) as Nana Rafaela
- Illusion Travels by Streetcar (1954) as Pasajera con santo
- Romance de fieras (1954) as Tía Remedios
- A Tailored Gentleman (1954) as Doña Manuelita (as Concha Gentil Arcos)
- Los Fernández de Peralvillo (1954) as Doña Esperanza
- The Seven Girls (1955) as Cholita
- Illusion Travels by Streetcar (1956)
- El fantasma de la casa roja (1956) as Romula Feucha
- The King of Mexico (1956) as Dueña de vitrina
- Las medias de seda (1956) as Trabajadora chismosa
- Las aventuras de Pito Pérez (1957) as Espectadora de falso misionero (uncredited)
- Asesinos, S.A. (1957) as Profesora de gimnasia (as Conchita G. Arcos)
- Chucho el Roto (1960)
- Ruletero a toda marcha (1962) as Anciana samaritana
- So Loved Our Fathers (1964)

== Bibliography ==
- RA (2000). "Gentil Arcos, Conchita". Época de Oro del cine mexicano de la A a la Z. Vol. 11. Somos.
- Monsiváis, Carlos (1999). "Rostros Complementarios". Rostros del Cine Mexicano (Third ed.). Américo Arte Editores, S. A. de C. V. ISBN 968-5059-06-3.
