= Petróleo =

Petróleo may refer to:

- Petroleum, crude oil
- Petroleum (film), a 1936 Mexican film
- Petróleo (footballer, born 1961), full name José Carlos de Oliveira, Brazilian footballer
- Petróleo (footballer, born 1993), full name Weverton da Silva Jacinto, Brazilian footballer

== See also ==
- La Petróleo, Spanish vedette
- Petroleum (disambiguation)
