= Consuelo Segarra =

Mexican actress (1876–1946)

- Born: 1876
- Died: April 28, 1946 (aged 69–70); Mexico City
- Occupation: Film actor

Consuelo Segarra Martínez (1876 – April 28, 1946) was a Mexican character actor during the Golden Age of Mexican Cinema. She appeared in sixty films, most prominently as La Comanca, the maternal figure of the title character in El tigre de Yautepec (1933). She also appeared in many stage performances, such as Vincente Morales' Patria y honra o La intervención francesa (c.1905).

Consuelo Segarra died on 28 April 1946 in Mexico City.

== Filmography ==
- La Calandria o Calandria (1933)
- El tigre de Yautepec (1933)
- Chucho el Roto (1934)
- Corazón bandolero (1934)
- Jesús García, el héroe de Nacozari (1934)
- La mujer del puerto (1934)
- La sangre manda (1934)
- Tierra, amor y dolor (1934)
- Luponini de Chicago (1935)
- El primo Basilio (1935)
- El rayo de Sinaloa (Heraclio Bernal) (1935)
- Tu hijo (o Amor de madre) (1935)
- Judas (1936)
- Malditas sean las mujeres (1936)
- Marihuana (El monstruo verde) (1936)
- ¡Ora Ponciano! (1936)
- El rosal bendito (1936)
- ¡Vámonos con Pancho Villa! (1936)
- Jalisco nunca pierde (1937)
- La madrina del diablo (1937)
- Suprema ley (1937)
- La Valentina (1938)
- En un burro tres baturros (1939)
- Los de abajo (Con la División del Norte) (1939)
- La herencia de La Llorona (1946)
