= Cradle Song (1953 film) =

Canción de cuna
- Directed by: Fernando de Fuentes
- Written by: Gregorio Martínez Sierra (play), María Martínez Sierra (story)
- Produced by: Fernando de Fuentes
- Starring: María Elena Marqués; Carmelita González; Alma Delia Fuentes
- Cinematography: Jorge Stahl Jr.
- Edited by: José W. Bustos
- Music by: Gustavo César Carrión
- Production companies: Dyana Films; América (technical unit); Estudios Cinematográficos del Tepeyac (studios and laboratories); RCA (II) (sound system)
- Distributed by: Azteca Films Inc. (1953) (United States-Spanish language)
- Release date: 2 April 1953
- Running time: 94 min
- Country: Mexico
- Language: Spanish

Cradle Song (Spanish: Canción de cuna) is a 1953 Mexican film. It was directed by Fernando de Fuentes. It is one of several films based on a successful play by the Spanish authors Maria and Gregorio Sierra Martinez.

== Plot ==
The daughter of a prostitute is abandoned in a convent where a nun cares for her, as she asks to not be taken to an hospice.

== Cast ==
- María Elena Marqués
- Carmelita González
- Alma Delia Fuentes
- Anita Blanch
- César del Campo
- Sara Guasch
- Fernando Cortés
- Queta Lavat
- Matilde Palou
- Verónica Loyo
- Beatriz Ramos
- Josefina Leiner
- Marcela Quevedo

== Reception ==
In Historia mínima. La cultura mexicana en el siglo XX, Carlos Monsiváis cites the film when describing what he considers a decline in the career of director Fernando de Fuentes: "The decline is incomprehensible: how is the director of Godfather Mendoza capable of committing monstrosities like Cradle Song (1953) and The Children of Maria Morales (1952)? Is it the exhaustion of a director or the crushing effect of an industry that allows neither rest nor the aesthetic ambitions of its creators?" In Historia del cine mexicano, Emilio García Riera quotes the film together with Sor Alegría (1952) as films that "were about compliant, happy, and heavily made-up nuns."
