= Una vida por otra =

1932 film

- Directed by: John H. Auer
- Written by: Fernando de Fuentes
- Cinematography: Alex Phillips
- Edited by: Aniceto Ortega
- Music by: Manuel Sereijo
- Production company: Compañía Nacional Productora de Películas
- Release date: 11 November 1932
- Running time: 85 minutes
- Country: Mexico
- Language: Spanish

Una vida por otra (English: One Life for Another) is a 1932 Mexican film, directed by John H. Auer in his directorial debut.

== Plot ==
The film tells the story of Lucia, who needs money for the treatment of her sick mother. She watches the murder of Joaquin, who blackmailed his former mistress Aurora. Aurora pays Lucia to take the blame. She reports the crime to the police claiming herself to be guilty, but refuses to explain details of the crime. However, when the money arrives at her mother, it no longer helps as she dies. Lucia's lawyer, Rafael, finds out the truth and ultimately resolves to clarify the incident in court, even though Aurora is his wife. When her act is revealed, Aurora commits suicide.

== Cast ==
- Nancy Torres as Lucia Zamora
- Julio Villarreal as Rafael Icaza
- Gloria Iturbe as Aurora
- Rosita Arriaga as Doña Lupita
- Joaquín Coss as Don Pancho Martínez y Martínez
- Alfredo del Diestro as Agente del ministerio público
- Sofía Álvarez as Sofía Arellano
- Víctor Urruchúa as Novio de Lucía
- Emma Roldán as Consuelo - vecina
- Ricardo Carti as Doctor González
- Jorge Peón
- Carlos López
- Jesús Melgarejo
- Beatriz Ramos
- Conchita Gentil Arcos

== Production ==
The film was produced by the companies Cia Nacional Productora de Pelicula and Inter-Americas Cinema. In the United States, Una vida por otra was distributed in Spanish by Cinexport Distributing and Jack Lustberg. John H. Auer was from Hungary and filmed foreign-language films in Hollywood before coming to Mexico. Since he did not speak Spanish, he was assisted by Fernando de Fuentes, with whom he collaborated in dialogue direction and storyboards.

== Bibliography ==
- García Riera, Emilio (1984). Fernando de Fuentes (1894/1958): trabajo colectivo. Cineteca Nacional.
