= La calandria =

La calandria may refer to:

- La calandria (play), a comedy play by Bernardo Dovizi da Bibbiena
- La calandria (1933 film), a 1933 Mexican film
- La calandria (1972 film), a 1972 Italian comedy film directed by Pasquale Festa Campanile
