= Marcela (disambiguation) =

Marcela is a feminine given name. It may also refer to:

- Marcela (TV series), a 1962 Mexican telenovela
- Marcela Paz, a pen name of Chilean writer Esther Huneeus Salas de Claro (1902–1985)
- Marcela (wrestler), ring name of Mexican professional wrestler María Elena Santamaría Gómez (born 1971)
- Achyrocline saturejoides, also known as marcela, a plant species
