= Silver and Gold =

Silver and Gold may refer to:

== Chemistry ==
Electrum, also called white gold, is gold that has silver added to it.

== Music ==
- Silver & Gold (Vanessa Williams album), also featuring the song by Burl Ives
- Silver & Gold (Neil Young album), also title song
- Silver & Gold (Sufjan Stevens album)
- "Silver and Gold" (Dolly Parton song)
- "Silver and Gold", song from the Sun City album by Artists United Against Apartheid, also recorded by U2
- "Silver and Gold", Christmas song by Burl Ives from the Rudolph the Red-Nosed Reindeer soundtrack
- Silver and Gold, album and song by ASAP
- "Silver and Gold", single by T-Pain
- "Silver and Gold, a song by Brooks & Dunn, from the 1994 album Waitin' on Sundown

== Television ==
- Silver and Gold (TV series), a 2017 Japanese TV series

== Video games ==
- Pokémon Silver and Pokémon Gold, two 1999 video games

== See also ==
- Gold and Silver, 1934 Mexican film
- Oro y plata (disambiguation)
