= Oro y plata =

Oro y plata (Spanish for "gold and silver") could refer to:

- Gold and Silver, a 1934 Mexican film
- The state motto of Montana

== See also ==
- Oro, Plata, Mata, a 1982 Philippine film
- Silver and Gold (disambiguation)
