= ¡Viva México! =

1934 film by Miguel Contreras Torres

¡Viva México! - Alma insurgente, El grito de Dolores
- Directed by: Miguel Contreras Torres
- Starring: Sara García
- Release date: 1934
- Running time: 80 minutes
- Country: Mexico
- Language: Spanish

¡Viva México! - Alma insurgente, El grito de Dolores ("Viva Mexico! (The Cry of Delores)") is a 1934 Mexican film about the events that caused the Mexican War of Independence. It stars Sara García.

== Cast ==
- Paco Martínez as Cura Hidalgo
- Sara García as Doña Josefa Ortiz de Domínguez
- Alberto Martí as Allende
- Joaquín Busquets as Capitán Almada
- José Cortés as El corregidor Domínguez
- Rodolfo Navarrete as Abasolo
- Paquita Estrada
- Jesús Melgarejo
- Alfonso Patiño Gómez
- Emma Roldán
