= Alma de bronce =

- Directed by: Dudley Murphy
- Written by: Hector C. Fernandez; Dudley Murphy
- Starring: Pedro Armendáriz; Carlos Orellana
- Release date: 1944
- Country: Mexico
- Language: Spanish

Alma de bronce (English: Soul of Bronze) is a 1944 Mexican film directed by Dudley Murphy. It stars Pedro Armendáriz and Carlos Orellana.

== Cast ==
- Pedro Armendáriz
- José Baviera
- Narciso Busquets
- Chela Castro
- Conchita Gentil Arcos
- Carlos Martínez Baena
- Gloria Marín
- Carlos Orellana
- Tito Renaldo
- Emma Roldán
- Andrés Soler
- Arturo Soto Rangel
