= Heroic Silence =

- Directed by: Ramón Peón
- Production company: La Mexicana
- Release date: 14 November 1935 (Mexico)
- Running time: 90 minutes
- Country: Mexico
- Language: Spanish

Heroic Silence (Spanish: Silencio sublime) is a 1935 Mexican drama film directed by Ramón Peón. It stars Alfredo del Diestro, LeopoldoOrtín, and Adria Delhort.

The film was produced by La Mexicana and Elaboradora de Películas.

== Plot ==
A poor man is imprisoned, but manages to flee just on the day of his daughter's wedding.

== Cast ==
- Alfredo del Diestro as Antonio Rodríguez
- Leopoldo Ortín as Tomás García (as Polo Ortín)
- Adria Delhort as Dolores
- Aurora del Real as Lupita
- Emma Roldán as Teresa
- René Cardona as Ricardo
- Estela Ametler as Doña Leonor
- Carlos López as El Pescado
- Miguel Arenas as Don Guillermo
- Fanny Schiller as Modista
- Manuel Noriega as Manuel, cantinero
- Estela Alicia Epstein as Lupita niña
- Gerardo del Castillo as José López El Seco
- José Escanero as Agente de policía
- José Ignacio Rocha as Agente de policía, preso
- Carlos L. Cabello as Preso
- Chel López as Preso
- Felipe de Flores as Invitado a la boda
- Fausto Alvarez as Preso cantante
