= Allá en el trópico =

1940 film

- Directed by: Fernando de Fuentes
- Release date: 1940
- Running time: 110 minute
- Country: Mexico
- Language: Spanish

Allá en el trópico (English: Back in the Tropics) is a 1940 Mexican comedy musical film directed by Fernando de Fuentes and starring Tito Guízar, Esther Fernández, Sara García and Carlos López.

== Cast ==
- Tito Guízar: José Juan García
- Esther Fernández: Esperanza
- Carlos López: Perico
- Sara García: Doña Panchita
- René Cardona :Felipe Cervantes
