= Verónica Loyo =

Mexican singer and actress

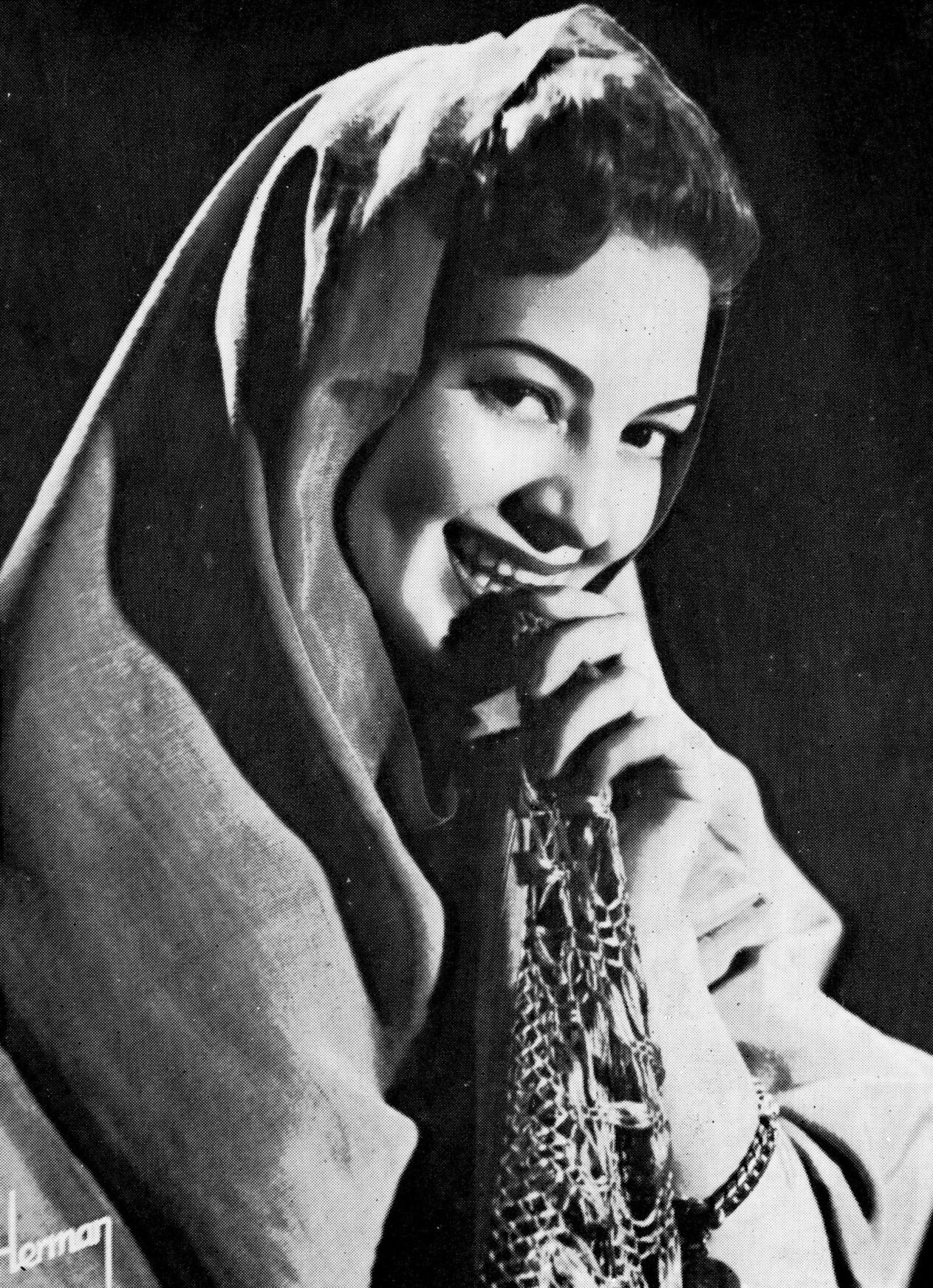
- Verónica Loyo in 1954
- Occupations: Singer, actress
- Years active: 1951–?

Verónica Loyo Nieto is a Mexican singer and actress, specialized in the musical genres of bolero, ranchera, huapango y vals.

== Partial discography ==
- Aires de la provincia (Dimsa DML-8107)

== Filmography ==
- Los hijos de María Morales (1952)
- Canción de cuna (1953)
- Ahí vienen los gorrones (1953)
- Romance de fieras (1954)
- Secreto profesional (1955)
- Pueblo quieto (1955)
- Bluebeard (1955)
- La fiera (1956)
- Rosalba (1956)
- El organillero (1957)
- Fiesta en el corazón (1958)
- Las tres coquetonas (1960)
- Los fanfarrones (1960)
- Locura de terror (1961)
- Un dorado de Pancho Villa (1967)
