= Noche de recién casados =

- Starring: Carlos Orellana
- Release date: 1941
- Country: Mexico
- Language: Spanish

Noche de recién casados ("Night of Newlyweds") is a 1941 Mexican film. It stars Carlos Orellana.
