= Alfonso Teja Zabre =

Mexican writer, historian, and educator (1888–1962)

Alfonso Teja Zabre (1888–1962) was a Mexican writer, historian, and educator. His 1920 novel Alas Abiertas (Open Wings) was adapted into a film directed by Luis Lezama.

He was born in San Luis de la Paz, Guanajuato, Mexico, on 23 December 1888. He wrote books on the history of Mexico, some used in schools, as well as biographies.

He died in Mexico City on 28 February 1962.

== Writings ==
- Vida de Morelos (1917)
- Alas abiertas (1920)
- La esperanza y Hatiké (1922)
- El nuevo Quetzalcóatl (1927)
- Historia de Cuauhtémoc (1934)
- Historia de México (1935)
- Panorama histórico de la Revolución mexicana (1939)
- Guía de la historia de México (1944)
- Breve historia de México (1947)

== Filmography ==
- Alas abiertas (1921), released in 1922 in the U.S. as With Wings Outspread
