= El fantasma de la casa roja =

- Directed by: Miguel M. Delgado
- Starring: Antonio Espino «Clavillazo» Alma Rosa Aguirre
- Release date: 2 February 1956
- Running time: 1h 31min

El fantasma de la casa roja is a 1956 Mexican horror comedy film directed by Miguel M. Delgado and starring Antonio Espino «Clavillazo» and Alma Rosa Aguirre.

== Cast ==
- Alma Rosa Aguirre - Mercedes Benz de Carrera
- Raúl Martínez - Raul Velasco
- Antonio Espino «Clavillazo» - Diogenes Holmes
- Jorge Reyes - Modesto Silvestre
- Guillermina Téllez Girón - Evangelina Buenrostro
- Víctor Alcocer - Licensiado
- Enriqueta Reza - Diana Alegre, ama de llaves
- Armando Arriola - Dr. Hipocrates Piedra
- Conchita Gentil Arcos - Romula Feucha
- Manuel Dondé - Pedro Satan, administrador
