= La Llorona (1933 film) =

- Original release poster
- Directed by: Ramón Peón
- Screenplay by: Carlos Noriega Hope; Fernando de Fuentes
- Story by: Antonio Guzmán Aguilera
- Starring: Ramón Pereda
- Cinematography: Guillermo Baqueriza
- Edited by: Guillermo Baqueriza
- Music by: Max Urban
- Production company: Eco Films
- Release date: May 25, 1933 (Mexico)
- Running time: 73 minutes
- Country: Mexico
- Language: Spanish

La Llorona (lit. 'The Crying Woman') is a 1933 Mexican supernatural horror film directed by Ramón Peón, written by Fernando de Fuentes and Carlos Noriega Hope, and stars Ramón Pereda, Virginia Zurí, Adriana Lamar and Carlos Orellana. It was the first Mexican horror film with sound.

== Plot ==
In Twentieth Century Mexico, a man dies of a heart attack, while at the same time, hearing the wailing of a woman. During the autopsy, many students of Dr. Ricardo de Acuña speculate that there could be some supernatural involvement with the man's death, while Ricardo simply brushes it off as natural causes.

Later, at his son Juanito's fourth birthday party, Ricardo and his wife Ana Maria relish in their happy lifestyle, while the butler Mario takes the fourteenth seat at the kids table to beat out a superstition, much to Juanito's grandfather Don Fernando's embarrassment and scolding. After the party, Fernando takes Ricardo aside into his study to tell him news that he believes the new father should know. Fernando talks about how his first born son was killed at four years old, stabbed to death. He then tells how their family ancestries are connected that of Hernán Cortés, and are therefore cursed. While he discuss this, a hooded figure wearing a strange ring watches them from a hidden passage. Fernando brandishes a large book to provide proof for his claims, which tells a story from the Elizabethan era, and how a previous member of the Acuña had a hand in the curse of the Cortés lineage.

In this story, Viceroy Rodrigo de Cortés of Mexico City is debating whether to or not to name his four-year old illegitimate son with a noblewoman and his mistress named Ana Xiconténcatl, who asks why he couldn't marry her instead of his arranged bride. As he leaves her house, Cortés is accosted by robbers, and Diego de Acuña (played by Pereda in a duel role) comes to his assistance while claiming to be on patrol of the city. As compensation for saving his life, Cortés invites Diego into Ana's home for a drink of wine. Inside, Diego and Ana share a moment before she leaves to gather wine for the three. Diego then reveals he was in the area not because of his patrol, but to see Ana and confess his full love, greatly angering Cortés. The two prepare to duel, but are stopped when Ana returns with the wine. Later, during the arranged marriage between Cortés and his wife, Diego arrives to the wedding with Ana and her son, still unnamed, much to the humiliation of Cortés and his family. Following the wedding disaster, Cortés returns to Ana's house, where he discovers a note where Diego challenges him to a duel, and soon after, Ana appears on the houses balcony. Cortés claims he wants his son, and Ana responds he'll never have the boy. Resolving that no one but her can have her son, Ana kills the boy, using the same ring as the hooded figure and sacrificial knife to kill the unnamed child. Afterwards, she commits suicide, and her wraith rises from her corpse. During this, Diego arrives and duels with Cortés, before the wailing of Ana's spirit causes the duel to end, as well as the story.

Back in the main story, Ricardo claims that the whole story is simply the tale of La llorona, and shouldn't be a cause for concern. Fernando assures him that is better to be safe than sorry, and to keep Juanito safe, all of this being said while the hooded figure continues to watch. Ricardo returns to his Ana Maria and they watch their son sleep while Fernando begins to read a book in the library. Mario and the maid Nana Goya both come to Fernando to be relived for the night, which he begrudgingly allows. During this down time, the hooded figure uses the hidden passage to the library to steal a second book that Fernando intended to show Ricardo. After the theft, the figure sneaks uses the same knife Ana had in the flashback story to kill Fernando, alerting Ricardo and Ana Maria with a scream. While Ricardo investigates, he sends Mario with Ana Maria and Juanito somewhere safe in the house, and finds Fernando's body and has another member of the staff, Francisco alert the police. He then runs back to his wife when he hears her screaming, seeing the hooded figure has kidnapped Juanito, disappearing into one of the passages. Ricardo gives chase, and he's attacked by the figure before they disappear into another passage. The authorities arrive, and Ricardo leads them to the passage where the figure disappeared, and then reveals the second book hidden under small trapdoor and takes place in the Age of Discovery, and gives the origin to the curse, the dagger, and the ring.

The story follows the woman known as Doña Marina or La Malinche during Hernán Cortés' conquest of the Aztecs and their empire. It is revealed that as his mistress, La Malinche had a son with Cortés and when the Spanish suffered a heavy defeat, they blame faulty information by her and sought revenge on La Malinche and her son. In a bid to please either side, Cortés forcefully took her son, driving La Malinche mad with grief. It reached the point where she cursed her former lover and all his children to suffer for all eternity, and later committed suicide with the dagger used in previous scenes in the film, and wearing the strange ring both Ana and the hooded figure wore. After her suicide, her ghost rises into the air, wailing. With this revealed, Ricardo and the police open the passage the figure escaped through and stop them from killing Juanito on a sacrificial altar with the dagger, shooting them dead. They pull the hood back to reveal a person, showing all the supernatural events were heavily orchestrated, though Ricardo now seems more superstitious, believing the person to have been possessed by La Llorona's spirit. Ricardo pulls the hood back to reveal the maid, Nana Goya as the hooded figure.

== Cast ==
Cast adapted from the liner notes of the Indicator home video release of La Llorona.

- Ramón Pereda as Dr. Ricardo de Acuña / Captain Diego de Acuña
- Virginia Zurí as Ana Maria de Acuña
- Carlos Orellana as Mario
- Adriana Lamar as Ana Xiconténcatl
- Alberto Martí as Rodrigo de Cortés
- Esperanza del Real as Nana Goya
- Paco Martínez as Don Fernando de Moncada
- María Luisa Zea as Doña Marina
- Alfredo del Diestro as Chief of Police
- Antonio Frausto as Francisco
- Conchita Gentil Arcos as Criada
- Carlos Vallejo Espinal as the voice of La Llorona

== Production ==
In the 1930s, a cycle of horror films began. In Mexico, the first sound film was released in 1932. La Llorona was one of the 21 sound films created in Mexico in 1933. The film's story is based on that of La llorona, a crying woman from Hispanic folklore who mourns her dead child. According to the newspaper El Universal, the filmmakers found difficulty in finding a voice for the ghost that would be convincing and not encourage laughter from the audience. Journalists of the newspaper noted that great expense was made to recreate the sets in the film to represent New Spain.

== Release and reception ==
Prior to the film's release, Emily Masincup of the Northwestern University stated that the film was highly anticipated due to the number of laudatory articles found and large banner ads found in Mexico prior to its release. La Llorona premiered in Mexico City's Cine Balmori on 25 May 1933.

From contemporary reviews, the Mexican newspaper Excélsior who commented that both horror and mystery films were put out to great difficulty noting the special effects involved, but that La Llorona was more impressive as it had to do that and recreate the period film sets. The film was declared the most serious work put out by Mexico's film industry yet. The liner notes of Indicator's blu-ray release stated that the Excélsior review was a typical response to the film as Mexican press found the film technological achievements was met with a sense of national pride. Among the few dissenting critics, Chano Urueta of Mundo cinematográfico found that the film trivialized Mexican history to create a Hollywood-like story. Harry T. Smith who reviewed the film in 1935 when it showed at Harlem's Teatro Compoamor, who found the film had "Excellent acting by all the principals" and that "some fine scenes of the Mexico of long ago all make the picture well worth seeing."

== Home media ==
La Llorona was believed to be lost for nearly half a century. It was uploaded to YouTube from what Emily Masincup of the Northwestern University described as a "poor quality television broadcast". While most films from the Calderón family studio survived from film negatives, La Llorona existed only as a 16 mm print. Peter Conheim of the Cinema Preservation Alliance stated this print was at least three generation removed from the primary source. Powerhouse Films/Indicator released a Blu-ray based on this print in 2022.

== Legacy ==
Following the release of La Llorona, Guillermo Calles was selected to direct the short feature La Chillona, a parody of La Llorona. The Llorona figure has appeared in several films since the 1933 feature, including dramatic films such as La herencia de la Llorona (1947), the Western The Living Coffin (1958), the luchador film La Venganza de La Llorana (1974) as well as gothic horror films such as La Llorona (1960) and The Curse of the Crying Woman (1961). The character vanished from Mexican cinema for decades only to be resurrected in the new millennium with Kilometer 31 (2006), J-ok'el (2007), and La leyenda de la Llorona (2011).
