= La Mujer sin Alma =

- Directed by: Fernando de Fuentes
- Written by: Alphonse Daudet
- Produced by: Luis Enrique Galindo
- Starring: María Félix; Fernando Soler; Antonio Badú; Andres Soler; Mimí Derba
- Cinematography: Víctor Herrera
- Edited by: Rafael Ceballos
- Music by: Francisco Domínguez
- Distributed by: Cinematogáfica de Guadalajara S.A
- Release date: 1944
- Running time: 129 minutes
- Country: Mexico
- Language: Spanish

La Mujer sin Alma ("The Soulless Woman") is a Mexican drama film of 1944, directed by Fernando de Fuentes and starring María Félix. The movie is an adaptation of an Alphonse Daudet novel.

== Plot ==
Teresa (Félix) is a young and evil woman who uses her beauty to seduce rich men and climb socially.
