= Carlos Noriega Hope =

Mexican writer and journalist

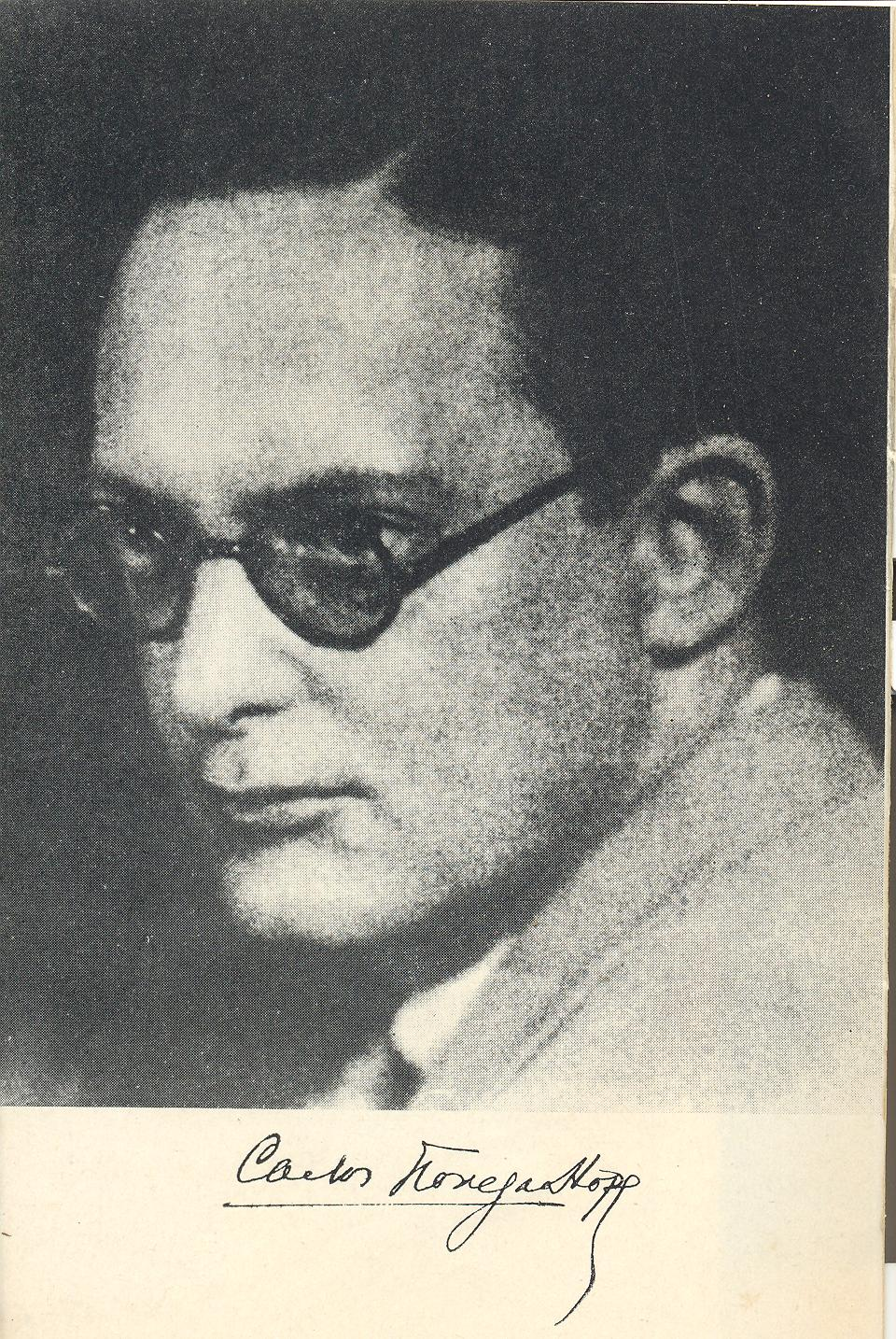
- Born: 6 November 1896; Tacubaya, Distrito Federal (Mexico)
- Died: 15 November 1934 (aged 38); Mexico City
- Occupation: Writer
- Writing career
- Notable work: Santa

Carlos Noriega Hope (Note: In this name that follows Hispanic American naming customs, the first or paternal surname is Noriega and the second or maternal family name is Hope.) (6 November 1896 – 15 November 1934) was a Mexican writer and journalist. Born in Tacubaya, Mexico City, he studied law and became a journalist. In 1919 he traveled to Hollywood to report on the new cinematographic industry. Besides writing the scripts for important films such as Santa (Mexico 1932, Actors: Carlos Orellana, Mimi Derba, Lupita Tovar), based on the book by Federico Gamboa, and Una vida por otra (One life for another, Mexico 1934), he published several short stories where he pictured the early rise of Hollywood. The book was edited under the names La inútil curiosidad and Las experiencias de Miss Patsy (Para qué? – "Ché" Ferrati, inventor—El viejo amigo—Las experiencias de Miss Patsy—La grande ilusión—El tesoro de Cabeza de Vaca—Fracaso—El honor del ridículo)

He edited the literary journal El Universal Ilustrado, which was crucial for the diffusion of Stridentism.
