= Jesús Bracho =

Mexican art director

- Born: 10 July 1910; Mexico
- Died: 1976 (aged 65–66); Mexico
- Occupation: Art director
- Years active: 1942–1963 (film)

Jesús Bracho (1910 – 1976) was a Mexican art director who designed the sets for over a hundred film productions. The young brother of the film director Julio Bracho, he was active during the Golden Age of Mexican cinema (1936-1956).

== Selected filmography ==
- I'm a Real Mexican (1942)
- Divorced (1943)
- Cantaclaro (1946)
- La mujer de todos (1946)
- Salón México (1949)
- The Woman of the Port (1949)
- Immaculate (1950)
- The Woman You Want (1952)
- Women Who Work (1953)
- The Young One (1960)
- My Mother Is Guilty (1960)

== Bibliography ==
- Raymond Durgnat. Luis Bunuel. University of California Press, 1977.
