= Corazón de fiera =

- Directed by: Ernesto Cortázar
- Written by: Ernesto Cortázar (screenplay), Luis Spota (story)
- Produced by: Fernando de Fuentes
- Starring: Antonio Badú, Rita Macedo, Lilia Prado
- Cinematography: Jorge Stahl Jr.
- Edited by: José W. Bustos
- Music by: Manuel Esperón
- Release date: 21 February 1951
- Country: Mexico
- Language: Spanish

Corazón de fiera is a 1951 Mexican film that was produced by Fernando de Fuentes.
