= The Devourer =

1946 film

- Directed by: Fernando de Fuentes
- Written by: Paulino Masip; Fernando de Fuentes
- Produced by: Fernando de Fuentes; Jesús Grovas
- Starring: María Félix; Luis Aldás; Julio Villarreal
- Cinematography: Ignacio Torres
- Edited by: Jorge Bustos
- Music by: Agustín Lara; Rosalío Ramírez
- Production company: Producciónes Grovas
- Release date: 18 April 1946
- Running time: 117 minutes
- Country: Mexico
- Language: Spanish

The Devourer (Spanish: La devoradora) is a 1946 Mexican crime drama film directed by Fernando de Fuentes and starring María Félix, Luis Aldás and Julio Villarreal. It was shot at the Azteca Studios in Mexico City. The film's sets were designed by the art director Vicente Petit. It has been classified as a film noir.

== Cast ==
- María Félix as Diana de Arellano
- Luis Aldás as Miguel Iturbe
- Julio Villarreal as Don Adolfo Gil
- Felipe de Alba as Pablo Ortega
- Arturo Soto Rangel as Don Manuel Ortega
- Conchita Gentil Arcos as Jacinta
- Salvador Quiroz as Inspector
- Manuel Arvide as Ricardo Galván
- Manuel Trejo Morales as Ernesto
- Salvador García as Cantante
- Joaquín Roche as Mayordomo
- Humberto Rodríguez as Gregorio, portero

== Bibliography ==
- Balderston, Daniel, Gonzalez, Mike & Lopez, Ana M. Encyclopedia of Contemporary Latin American and Caribbean Cultures. Routledge, 2002.
- Mraz, John. Looking for Mexico: Modern Visual Culture and National Identity. Duke University Press, 2009.
- Spicer, Andrew. Historical Dictionary of Film Noir. Scarecrow Press, 2010.
- Thornton, Niamh. María Félix: A Mexican Film Star and Her Legacy. Boydell & Brewer, 2023.
