= Divorced (1943 film) =

- Directed by: Alejandro Galindo
- Written by: Ramón Obón; José de Jesús Vizcaino; Alejandro Galindo
- Produced by: Mauricio de la Serna
- Starring: Blanca de Castejón; René Cardona; Milisa Sierra
- Cinematography: Víctor Herrera
- Edited by: Jorge Bustos
- Music by: Raúl Lavista
- Production company: Clasa Films Mundiales
- Release date: 9 December 1943
- Running time: 85 minutes
- Country: Mexico
- Language: Spanish

Divorced (Spanish title: Divorciadas) is a 1943 Mexican drama film directed and co-written by Alejandro Galindo and starring Blanca de Castejón, René Cardona and Milisa Sierra. The film's sets were designed by the art director Jesús Bracho.

== Cast ==
- Blanca de Castejón as Cristina
- René Cardona as Luis Reiner
- Milisa Sierra as Carmen
- Delia Magaña as Juanita
- Juan José Martínez Casado as Dr. Rafael Gálvez
- Virginia Zurí as Elena
- Ramiro Gómez Kemp as Rolando
- Eugenia Galindo as Amparo
- Víctor Velázquez as Robles
- José Ortiz de Zárate
- Alfonso Jiménez
- Manuel Dondé as Abogado
- Lolo Trillo
- Sofía Haller
- Joaquín Roche
- Alfredo Varela as Doctor
- Alicia Reyna]
- Chiquita Escobar
- Camilo Farjat
- Ignacio Peón

== Bibliography ==
- Mora, Carl J. Mexican Cinema: Reflections of a Society, 1896-2004. McFarland, 2005.
