= La Zandunga (film) =

1938 film by Fernando de Fuentes

- Directed by: Fernando de Fuentes
- Written by: Salvador Novo; Rafael M. Saavedra
- Produced by: Pedro A. Calderón
- Starring: Lupe Vélez; Arturo de Córdova; Joaquín Pardavé
- Cinematography: Alex Phillips
- Edited by: Charles L. Kimball
- Music by: Francisco Domínguez
- Distributed by: Clasa Films Mundiales
- Release date: March 18, 1938
- Running time: 107 minutes
- Country: Mexico
- Language: Spanish

La Zandunga is a 1938 Mexican romantic drama film directed by Fernando de Fuentes and starring the "Mexican Spitfire" Lupe Vélez.

== Plot ==
In a little town around Tehuantepec, in Oaxaca, Mexico, lives a beautiful and cheerful girl named Lupe, in love with a stranger marine named Juancho. The man has to go to Veracruz and promises Lupe that he will return and marry her. After several months, Lupe loses hope of seeing him again and accepts the offer of another man to marry.

== Cast ==
- Lupe Vélez as Lupe
- Arturo de Córdova as Juancho
- Joaquín Pardavé as Don Catarino
- María Luisa Zea as Marilú
- Rafael Falcón as Ramón
- Carlos López "El Chaflán" as The Secretary
- Conchita Gentil Arcos as Doña Mariquita

== Production notes ==
This was the first Spanish-speaking movie for Lupe Vélez, who, after a massive career in Hollywood, returned to Mexico to take advantage of her popularity among Hispanic audiences.
