= Revolution (1933 film) =

- Directed by: Miguel Contreras Torres
- Written by: Miguel Contreras Torres
- Produced by: Miguel Contreras Torres
- Starring: Miguel Contreras Torres
- Cinematography: Ezequiel Carrasco; Alex Phillips
- Edited by: José Marino; Fernando C. Tamayo
- Distributed by: Columbia Pictures (U.S.)
- Release date: 8 February 1933 (Mexico)
- Country: Mexico
- Language: Spanish

Revolution, (Spanish: Revolución) also known as La sombra de Pancho Villa, (English: "Pancho Villa's Shadow") is a 1933 Mexican drama film. It was directed by Miguel Contreras Torres, who also starred in the film. The film deals with the Mexican Revolution. It is one of the first Mexican films that dealt with the revolution, and the first sound film to do so.

== Plot ==
Doroteo, engineering student, is in love with Adelita. However, the strongman of the region, Medrano, also desires the young woman and therefore has Doroteo imprisoned. While he is in jail, his ranch is raided and burned down. In this attack, Doroteo's grandmother is killed and his sister is raped. After being released, Doroteo participates in the revolution and joins Pancho Villa. After being defeated in the Battle of Celaya, he returns home, kills Medrano and marries Adelita. Then he rejoins the revolutionary troops.

== Cast ==
- Miguel Contreras Torres as Daniel Romero aka Doroteo Villar
- Luis G. Barreiro as Canuto aka Sanguijela
- Manuel Tamés as Macario aka Sietevidas
- Alfredo del Diestro as Medrano
- Rosita Arriaga as Romero's Widow
- Carmen Guerrero as Adelita
- Sofía Álvarez as Valentina
- Antonio R. Frausto as Pantaleón
- Paquita Estrada as María
- Adalberto Menéndez as Martín
- Emma Roldán as Healer
- Alfonso Sánchez Tello as Villista General
- Ricardo Carti as Villista General
- Ramón Peón as Canteeneer
- Max Langler as Medrano's Minion

== Production ==
Miguel Contreras Torres himself took part in the Mexican Revolution. He fought in the army of Venustiano Carranza. Contreras Torres not only directed and starred the film, he also wrote the script and produced it in his own production company. In the United States, the film was distributed by Columbia Pictures in 1934 without subtitles.
