= By the False Door =

1950 film

- Directed by: Fernando de Fuentes
- Written by: Mauricio Magdaleno; Fernando de Fuentes
- Produced by: Fernando de Fuentes
- Starring: Pedro Armendáriz; Rita Macedo; Andrea Palma
- Cinematography: Jorge Stahl Jr.
- Edited by: José W. Bustos
- Music by: Raúl Lavista
- Production company: Diana Films
- Release date: 16 November 1950
- Running time: 93 minutes
- Country: Mexico
- Language: Spanish

By the False Door (Spanish: Por la puerta falsa) is a 1950 Mexican drama film directed by Fernando de Fuentes and starring Pedro Armendáriz, Rita Macedo and Andrea Palma. The film's sets were designed by the art director Javier Torres Torija.

== Cast ==
- Pedro Armendáriz as Bernardo Celis
- Rita Macedo as Adela Quiroga
- Andrea Palma as doña Abigail Quiroga
- Luis Beristáin as Santitos
- Ramón Gay as Ramón
- Pepe del Río as Pedro
- Antonio R. Frausto as Tirso
- José Muñoz Romualdo
- Enrique Díaz Indiano as Don Santos Quiroga
- Enedina Díaz de León as Candelaria
- Joaquín Roche as don Jorge
- Aurora Ruiz as Sirvienta de Abigail
- Eduardo Vivas as Doctor Torres

== Bibliography ==
- Mora, Carl J. Mexican Cinema: Reflections of a Society, 1896–2004. McFarland, 2005.
- Riera, Emilio García. Historia documental del cine mexicano: 1949–1950. Universidad de Guadalajara, 1992
