= Hasta que perdió Jalisco =

1945 Mexican film

- Directed by: Fernando de Fuentes
- Release date: 1945
- Running time: 115 minute
- Country: Mexico
- Language: Spanish

Hasta que perdió Jalisco ("Until He Lost Jalisco") is a 1945 Mexican musical comedy film. It was directed by Fernando de Fuentes.
