= Esperanza (film) =

- Directed by: Fernando de Fuentes
- Release date: 1946
- Running time: 100 minute
- Country: Mexico
- Language: Spanish

Esperanza ("Hope") is a 1946 Mexican film. It was directed by Fernando de Fuentes.
