= Hipólito, el de Santa =

- Directed by: Fernando de Fuentes
- Written by: Luis Alcoriza
- Starring: José Luis Jiménez
- Release date: 1950
- Running time: 100 minute
- Country: Mexico
- Language: Spanish

Hipólito, el de Santa ("Hippolytis the Saint") is a 1950 Mexican film. It was directed by Fernando de Fuentes and written by Luis Alcoriza.

== Plot ==
Hipolito is a blind cabaret pianist who comes to the aid of a young woman named Santa. He hides from her the fact that he's blind because he doesn't want her pity.

== Cast ==
- José Luis Jiménez
- Esther Fernandez
- Jaime Jimenez Pons
- Emma Roldan
- Jose Torvay
