= ¡Así se quiere en Jalisco! =

1942 film by Fernando de Fuentes

- Directed by: Fernando de Fuentes
- Written by: Carlos Arniches (novel), Fernando de Fuentes and Antonio Guzmán Aguilera
- Produced by: Fernando de Fuentes and Jesús Grovas
- Cinematography: John W. Boyle and Agustín Martínez Solares
- Music by: Manuel Esperón and Juan José Espinosa
- Release date: 1942
- Country: Mexico
- Language: Spanish

¡Así se quiere en Jalisco! ("That's the way we love in Jalisco!") is a 1942 Mexican film directed by Fernando de Fuentes. It was commented that this was the first Mexican film to be shot in colour. However, a black-and-white version of this film is what actually can be seen on television.
