= Josefina Leiner =

Mexican actress

Leiner in a publicity photo

Josefina Leiner, born Josefina Noguera Escobar, (19 March 1928 – February 9, 2017) was a Mexican film and television actress best known for her movie roles during the Golden Age of Mexican cinema, including Los hijos de María Morales in 1952, It Happened in Acapulco in 1953, Los que no deben nacer in 1953, Pablo y Carolina in 1957, and Viva Jalisco que es mi tierra in 1961.

In 1962, she joined the cast of the Televisa telenovela, Marcela, opposite Felipe del Castillo and Bárbara Gil. Marcela marked her last professional role before her retirement from acting.

Josefina Leiner died on February 9, 2017, at the age of 88. Her death was announced by the Instituto Mexicano de Cinematografía.
