= No basta ser madre =

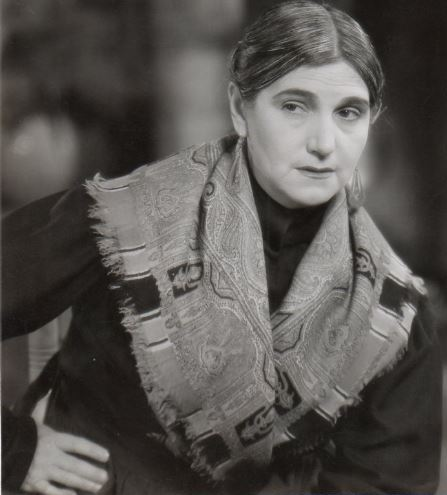
- Sara García as Sebastiana del Puerto
- Starring: Carlos Orellana; Sara García
- Release date: 1937
- Country: Mexico
- Language: Spanish

No basta ser madre ("Not Enough to be Mother") is a 1937 Mexican film. It stars Carlos Orellana and Sara García.
