= La sombra del otro =

La sombra del otro may refer to:

- La sombra del otro (film)
- La sombra del otro (1963 TV series)
- La sombra del otro (1996 TV series)
