= The Children of Maria Morales =

1952 film

- Directed by: Fernando de Fuentes
- Written by: Ernesto Cortázar, Paulino Masip
- Produced by: Fernando de Fuentes, Antonio Matouk
- Starring: Pedro Infante, Antonio Badú, Emma Roldán, Carmelita González, Irma Dorantes, Josefina Leiner, Verónica Loyo.
- Cinematography: Ignacio Torres
- Edited by: José W. Bustos
- Music by: Manuel Esperón
- Production company: Producciones Dyana
- Release date: 14 August 1952
- Running time: 114 minutes
- Country: Mexico
- Language: Spanish

The Children of Maria Morales (Spanish: "Los hijos de María Morales") is a 1952 Mexican comedy drama film directed by Fernando de Fuentes and starring Pedro Infante, Antonio Badú, Emma Roldán, Carmelita González, Irma Dorantes and Josefina Leiner. This film marked the film debut of the actress and singer Verónica Loyo.

== Cast ==
- Pedro Infante as José Morales
- Antonio Badú as Luis Morales
- Emma Roldán as María Morales
- Carmelita González as Gloria Magaña
- Irma Dorantes as María
- Josefina Leiner as Lupe
- Verónica Loyo as Lola Gómez, La Torcasa
- Andrés Soler as Carlos Salvatierra
- Tito Novaro as Tomás Gutiérrez
- José Muñoz as Bandit
- Salvador Quiroz as Don Tacho, the barman
- Lupe Inclán as Chencha
- Pepe Nava as Villager (uncredited)
