= Los que no deben nacer =

1953 film

- Directed by: Agustin P. Delgado
- Written by: Félix B. Caignet - Agustin P. Delgado
- Starring: Sara García
- Cinematography: Rosalio Solano
- Music by: Gonzalo Curiel
- Release date: 7 October 1953
- Country: Mexico
- Language: Spanish

Los que no deben nacer ("Those who shouldn't be born") is a 1953 Mexican film. It stars Sara García.

== Plot ==
A wealthy couple have a child that is born without both legs. To shelter his wife from the pain of knowing that their only child had been born crippled, he convinces their maid to trade the child she is expecting with his. She agrees and out of greed and bitterness she sells the child to the circus. The circus becomes the child's home where he grows up being exploited and exhibited as a human freak.

== Cast ==
- Anita Blanch
- Jaime Calpe
- Alejandro Ciangherotti
- Isabela Corona
- Sara García
- Pituka de Foronda
- Josefina Leiner
- Fernando Luján
- Rafael Montalvo
- Álvaro Ortiz
- Chula Prieto
