= Adam, Eve and the Devil =

1945 film

- Directed by: Alfredo B. Crevenna
- Written by: Edmundo Báez; Francisco Cabrera; Alfredo B. Crevenna
- Based on: The Broken Jug by Heinrich von Kleist
- Produced by: Francisco Cabrera
- Starring: Roberto Soto; Gloria Aguiar; Emma Roldán
- Cinematography: Jorge Stahl Jr.
- Edited by: Gloria Schoemann
- Music by: Manuel Esperón
- Production company: General Cinematografrica
- Distributed by: Clasa-Mohme
- Release date: 10 August 1945
- Running time: 84 minutes
- Country: Mexico
- Language: Spanish

Adam, Eve and the Devil (Spanish: Adán, Eva y el diablo) is a 1945 Mexican comedy film directed by Alfredo B. Crevenna and starring Roberto Soto, Gloria Aguiar and Emma Roldán. The film is based on the play The Broken Jug by Heinrich von Kleist. It was shot at the Azteca Studios in Mexico City. The film's sets were designed by the art director Ramón Rodríguez Granada who was nominated for an Ariel Award his work.

== Cast ==
- Roberto Soto
- Gloria Aguiar
- Emma Roldán
- Lauro Benítez
- Alfredo del Diestro
- Roberto Meyer
- Tito Renaldo
- Enriqueta Reza
- Carlos Riquelme
- Rubén Rojo
- Amelia Wilhelmy

== Bibliography ==
- Elena, Alberto. El cine del tercer mundo: diccionario de realizadores. Turfan, 1993.
- Riera, Emilio García. Historia documental del cine mexicano: 1943-1945. Universidad de Guadalajara, 1992.
