= Jalisco Sings in Seville =

1949 film

- Directed by: Fernando de Fuentes
- Written by: Paulino Masip; Adolfo Torrado; Fernando de Fuentes
- Produced by: Fernando de Fuentes; Miguel Mezquíriz
- Starring: Jorge Negrete; Carmen Sevilla; Jesús Tordesillas
- Cinematography: Víctor Herrera
- Edited by: Juan Serra
- Music by: Manuel L. Quiroga
- Production companies: Chamartín Producciones y Distribuciones; Producciones Diana
- Distributed by: Azteca Films
- Release date: 31 January 1949
- Running time: 113 minutes
- Countries: Mexico; Spain
- Language: Spanish

Jalisco Sings in Seville (Spanish: Jalisco canta en Sevilla) is a 1949 Mexican-Spanish musical comedy film directed by Fernando de Fuentes and starring Jorge Negrete, Carmen Sevilla and Jesús Tordesillas. This film represents the first Mexican-Spanish cinematic co-production. The story and musical numbers emphasize the cultural affinities between Mexico and Spain while warmly celebrating their differences. It was shot at the Chamartín Studios in Madrid and on location in Seville. The film's sets were designed by the art director Sigfrido Burmann.

== Plot ==
The story concerns a handsome charro from Jalisco, and his fat sidekick. The charro receives news that he has inherited a fortune from a distant relative in Spain, and so he must travel to Seville to collect it. A legal technicality impedes the speedy disbursement of his inheritance, so our the two heroes take jobs on a local ranch as farmhands. It turns out that the owner of the ranch was formerly a bullfighter, and has fond memories of Mexico. For this reason he befriends the charro. The charro goes on to win the heart of the ranch owner's daughter, and manages to recover his inheritance with his father-in-law's help.

== Cast ==
- Jorge Negrete as Nacho Mendoza
- Carmen Sevilla as Araceli Vargas
- Armando Soto La Marina as Nopal
- Jesús Tordesillas as Don Manuel Vargas
- Manuel Arbó as José Guseiro
- Antonio Almorós as Salvador Hinojares
- Leonor María
- Ena Sedeño
- Ángel de Andrés
- Arturo Marín
- Gabriel Algara
- Custodia España
- Mercedes Muñoz Sampedro
- Francisco Bernal
- Casimiro Hurtado
- Rufino Inglés
- Trío Calaveras

== Bibliography ==
- Labanyi, Jo & Pavlović, Tatjana. A Companion to Spanish Cinema. John Wiley & Sons, 2012.
- Schroeder, Paul A. Latin American Cinema: A Comparative History. University of California Press, 2016.
