= El fantasma del convento =

The Phantom of the Monastery
- Original Spanish theatrical release poster
- Directed by: Fernando de Fuentes
- Written by: Fernando de Fuentes; Jorge Pezet; Juan Bustillo Oro
- Produced by: Jorge Pezet
- Starring: Marta Roel; Carlos Villatoro; Enrique del Campo; Paco Martinez; Jose Rocha; Victorio Blanco
- Cinematography: Ross Fisher
- Edited by: Fernando de Fuentes
- Music by: Max Urban
- Production company: Producciones FESA (Films Exchange)
- Distributed by: Rayo Films (Argentina); Cinexport Distributing (United States)
- Release date: 27 June 1934 (Mexico City)
- Running time: 85 minutes
- Country: Mexico
- Language: Spanish

El fantasma del convento (lit. The Ghost of the Convent; American release title: The Phantom of the Monastery) is a 1934 Mexican horror film directed by Fernando de Fuentes, who also co-wrote and edited the film.

== Plot ==
One night, Eduardo (Carlos Villatoro), his wife Cristina (Marta Roel) and their friend, Alfonso (Enrique del Campo) lose their way in the mountains and are guided by a mysterious stranger to an eerie monastery inhabited by the Order of the Brothers of Silence. They are allowed to stay the night, but mysterious happenings begin to unnerve them.

A meal with the Brothers is interrupted by a mysterious wind; when the Brothers leave to pray against a supposedly malevolent force, the three find only ashes on the plates that had held food. They follow and watch the monks fervently praying. Returning to the dining hall (where they once again find food on their plates), the old Father Superior (Paco Martinez) tells them the story of Brother Rodrigo, a man who long ago desired his friend's wife; Rodrigo later found the cursed Book of Evil and used it to sell his soul to acquire his desire. When the friend mysteriously died, Rodrigo could not find peace and came to the monastery to become a monk and to later die in his cell, but to never find peace in death, and that his spirit continually returns to the now sealed cursed cell. As the Father Superior tells the story, Cristina secretly scratches the word "coward" on the table for Alfonso to see.

Alfonso, Eduardo and Cristina are escorted back to their chambers. Cristina sneaks into Alfonso's chamber and tries to seduce him; about to give in to her advances, he makes her leave. Changing his mind, he goes to her door and begs her to let him in, but receives no reply. Alfonso goes to the fateful cell and, when the locked door opens of its own accord, enters it. Inside, the sinful monk's mummified corpse gestures towards a book on the stool beside the bed on which it is lying. Alfonso reads the book and finds that it is the Book of Evil that had caused Brother Rodrigo's downfall. As he too is tempted, he speaks Eduardo's name aloud and the pages begin dripping blood, forming the words "will die".

When the mummified body on the bed turns into the cadaver of Eduardo, Alfonso is trapped in the room, which is once again locked, and sinks into a delirium. When he awakens the next morning, he finds himself in the hallway outside the room and is reunited with Cristina, who seems returned to normal, and Eduardo, who is still alive. The trio find out from a custodian that the monastery has been an empty ruin for many years and that the crypt with the mummified monks has become a tourist attraction. Their belief that the whole experience was a dream is shaken when, examining the now dust-covered dining table, they find the word "coward" that Cristina had scratched upon it the night before.

== Cast ==
- Enrique del Campo as Alfonso
- Marta Roel as Cristina
- Carlos Villatoro as Eduardo
- Paco Martínez as Padre Prior
- Victorio Blanco as Monje

== Production ==
El fantasma del convento was co written and produced by Jorge Pezet and directed by Fernando de Fuentes. Development and production for the film began in 1933. Following the success of La Llorona which was based on the legendary spirit of the same name, and was co-written by director Fuentes, the filmmakers quickly decided to follow-up with the film's success with another horror film. The idea for the film came from producer Jorge Pezet. Pezet had recently developed a fascination with the desiccated mummies displayed in Mexico's Museo de El Carmen. Determined to use them for a film, Pezet, along with director Fuentes, and Juan Bustillo Oro developed a screenplay that featured three young adults who are forced to spend the night at a monastery only to discover that their hosts were members of the undead. Filming took place on location in a Teotzotlan monastery.

== Reception ==
Unlike 1933's La Llorona, El Fantasma del Convento was not released to American audiences, though it has amassed a cult following in more recent years with its recent availability on Blu-ray and online purchases, allowing for more reviews to come through to larger audiences. On his website Fantastic Movie Musings and Ramblings, Dave Sindelar called it "one of the best of the Mexican horror movies", praising its striking imagery and use of sound. On IMDb, the film holds a score of 6.9 stars out of 10, resulting in "above average" reviews.

== Home Video ==
The restored film was released on Blu-ray as a Limited Edition with Special Features by the Powerhouse Indicator label on March 21, 2022.
