= El rey se divierte =

- Directed by: Fernando de Fuentes
- Release date: 1944
- Country: Mexico
- Language: Spanish

El rey se divierte ("The Sports King") is a 1944 Mexican comedy film. It was directed by Fernando de Fuentes.
