= El Universal Ilustrado =

Mexican weekly illustrated literary magazine of the 1920s

El Universal Ilustrado was a Mexican weekly illustrated literary magazine of the 1920s which published works from experimental writers and artists. The magazine was published in Mexico City between 1917 and 1928.

== History and profile ==
A cultural supplement to El Universal, the magazine was first published in 1917, and was considered one of Mexico City's most prominent journals. The owner of the magazine was Félix Palavicini.

Carlos Noriega Hope served as the editor of El Universal Ilustrado. He appointed to the post in March 1920 and his term ended in 1925. During the 1920s, the magazine featured works by writers such as Mariano Azuela, Salvador Novo, and Cube Bonifant. It launched Mexico City's first radio station in the 1920s. The magazine folded in 1928.
