= Revolution Trilogy =

The Revolution Trilogy (Spanish: Trilogía de la Revolución) is a series of 1930s movies about the Mexican Revolution by Fernando de Fuentes. The three movies are El prisionero trece (1933), El compadre Mendoza (1934) and Vámonos con Pancho Villa (1936). All three share a disenchanted view of the conflict, as opposed to the more common romantic, folk, and heroic viewpoints present in more well-known productions.

== Three portraits of the same conflict ==
According to Mraz, De Fuentes dedicates each film to one theme of conflict and loss:

- El prisionero trece: Huertistas are represented in the figure of Colonel Julián Carrasco, who descends into alcohol abuse and violence against his family, whom he ultimately destroys.
- El compadre Mendoza: Zapatistas appear in the form of General Felipe Nieto, a fictitious cousin of Emiliano Zapata who enjoys the friendship of Rosalio Mendoza until the last years of the conflict. The only empathy shown by De Fuentes in the trilogy is demonstrated by the Zapatism in this movie.
- Vámonos con Pancho Villa: Villistas are depicted as cruel and cowardly, demystifying Pancho Villa himself and his closer group of soldiers, the Dorados.

== Reception ==
The three movies were not well received by audiences. Particularly ill-met was the 1936 Vámonos con Pancho Villa, which only lasted one week in theatres and ultimately led to the production company's bankruptcy. Nevertheless, thanks to critics and cineclubs, the trilogy was rediscovered and reevaluated during the 1960s as a milestone in Mexican cinema.

In 2010, to commemorate the war's centenary, Filmoteca de la UNAM released a DVD edition of the restored version of the trilogy, the first attempt to popularize these films since their initial release in the 1930s.

== See also ==
- Factions in the Mexican Revolution
