= El vuelo de la muerte =

- Directed by: Guillermo Calles
- Written by: Antonio Guzmán Aguilera (as Guz Aguila)
- Starring: Sara García
- Cinematography: Ezequiel Carrasco
- Music by: Max Urban
- Production company: Pereda Films
- Release date: 17 December 1934 (Mexico)
- Country: Mexico
- Language: Spanish

El vuelo de la muerte (Death Flight) is a 1934 Mexican black and white film directed by Guillermo Calles. It stars Sara García. It is an aviation film with melodramatic developments.

== Release ==
The film was released in 1935 in the United States.

== Cast ==
- Sara Garcia
- Francisco Martínez
- Ramon Pereda
- Luis G. Barreiro
- Jorge Del Moral
- Carlos L. Cabello
- Adriana Lamar
- Rosa Castro
- Julio Villareal
- Pili Castellanos
- Andrés Buchelly
- E. Perdomo
