= Godfather Mendoza =

- Directed by: Fernando de Fuentes
- Written by: Mauricio Magdaleno
- Screenplay by: Fernando de Fuentes; Juan Bustillo Oro
- Produced by: José Castellot Jr.; Rafael Ángel Frías; Antonio Prida Santacilia
- Starring: Alfredo del Diestro; Carmen Guerrero; Antonio R. Frausto
- Cinematography: Ross Fisher
- Edited by: Fernando de Fuentes
- Music by: Manuel Castro Padilla
- Production company: Interamericana Films S.A
- Release date: 1934
- Running time: 85 minutes
- Country: Mexico
- Language: Spanish

Godfather Mendoza (Spanish: El compadre Mendoza) is a 1934 Mexican film. It was directed by Fernando de Fuentes, and is the second of his Revolution Trilogy, preceded by El prisionero trece (1933) and followed by Vámonos con Pancho Villa (1936).

In 1994, the Mexican magazine Somos published a list of "The 100 best movies of the cinema of Mexico" in its 100th edition and choose El compadre Mendoza the 3rd best of all time, just behind Vámonos con Pancho Villa and Los olvidados.

== Plot ==
This is the story of Rosalío Mendoza, a Mexican landowner during the Mexican Revolution of 1910. Rosalío survives by befriending both the army and the revolutionaries. Everyone is welcomed in his ranch, but the situation becomes unbearable and Rosalío must choose whose side he is on.

== Cast ==
Various of main cast appeared in more than one movie of the trilogy:

- Alfredo del Diestro
- Carmen Guerrero
- Antonio R. Frausto
- Luis G. Barreiro
- Emma Roldán
