= Petróleo (footballer, born 1961) =

Brazilian footballer (born 1961)

Personal information
- Full name: José Carlos de Oliveira
- Date of birth: 24 July 1961 (age 65)
- Place of birth: Catanduva, Brazil
- Height: 1.78 m (5 ft 10 in)
- Position: Forward

Senior career*
Years	Team	Apps	(Gls)
1979–1980	América-SP		
1981	América-MG		
1982–1983	Botafogo		
1983–1984	Goytacaz		
1984	Coritiba		
1985	Botafogo		
1986	Ceará		
1987	Comercial-SP		
1987–1988	Braga		
1988–1989	Amarante		
1990	Felgueiras		
1990–1991	Paredes		
1991–1994	Esposende		
1994	Comercial-SP		
1995–1996	Ceará		
1997	Quixadá		
- * Club domestic league appearances and goals as of 5 February 2025

José Carlos de Oliveira (born 24 July 1961), better known as Petróleo is a Brazilian former professional footballer who played as a forward.

== Career ==
A striker, Petróleo began his career at América de Rio Preto in 1979, he also played for América Mineiro until arriving in 1982 at Botafogo FR, the team for which he was most notable. He also played for Coritiba in 1984, and in 1986 he was state champion for Ceará. After playing for Comercial, he played for several years for Portuguese teams, such as SC Braga, Amarante FC, FC Felgueiras, USC Paredes and AD Esposende. He played once again for Comercial-SP and Ceará, and ended his career in 1997 for Quixadá FC.

== Honours ==
Ceará

- Campeonato Cearense: 1986, 1996
