= El jefe máximo =

- Directed by: Fernando de Fuentes
- Release date: 1940
- Running time: 107 minute
- Country: Mexico
- Language: Spanish

El jefe máximo ("The Supreme Leader") is a 1940 Mexican film. It was directed by Fernando de Fuentes.
