= La selva de fuego =

- Directed by: Fernando de Fuentes
- Written by: Tito Davison; Paulino Masip
- Produced by: Mauricio de la Serna
- Starring: Dolores del Río; Arturo de Córdova; Miguel Inclán
- Cinematography: Agustín Martínez Solares
- Edited by: Jose W. Bustos
- Music by: Max Urban
- Distributed by: Producciones Grovas
- Release date: December 27, 1945
- Running time: 76 minutes
- Country: Mexico
- Language: Spanish

La selva de fuego (The jungle of fire) is a 1945 Mexican romantic drama film directed by Fernando de Fuentes and starring Dolores del Río.

== Plot summary ==
The movie develops into the Jungle of Chiapas in Mexico. A beautiful woman named Estrella (Dolores del Río) is lost in a savage zone of the jungle. She is found by a group of men who are being held into the jungle as social outcasts. Their leader, Luciano (Arturo de Córdova) is a man of integrity, but with an inexplicable hatred toward women. The presence of a sensual woman among several alone men causes chaos that only Luciano can save.

== Curiosities ==
According to María Félix in her autobiography (Todas mis Guerras Mexico, 1993), cause of this movie, she and Dolores del Río mistook their paths for only time. The film was written by Félix, but the messenger sent by mistake the film for Dolores. María finished filming the movie Vértigo (written by Dolores).
