= The Dressel Family =

- Directed by: Fernando de Fuentes
- Release date: 1935
- Running time: 90 minute
- Country: Mexico
- Language: Spanish

The Dressel Family (Spanish: La familia Dressel) is a 1935 Mexican film. It was directed by Fernando de Fuentes.
