= The Blood Stain =

- Directed by: Adolfo Best Maugard
- Written by: Miguel Ruiz Moncada; Adolfo Best-Maugard
- Produced by: Francisco Beltrán; Miguel Ruiz Moncada
- Cinematography: Ross Fisher; Agustín Jiménez
- Edited by: Miguel Ruiz Moncada
- Music by: Jose Gamboa Ceballos
- Release date: 1937
- Running time: 70 minutes
- Country: Mexico
- Language: Spanish

The Blood Stain (Spanish:La Mancha de Sangre) is a 1937 Mexican drama film directed by Adolfo Best Maugard and starring Estela Inda, José Casal and Heriberto G. Batemberg. It had serious problems with the Mexican censors due to its portrayal of prostitution. The film's sets were designed by the art director Mariano Rodríguez Granada.

== Cast ==
- Estela Inda
- José Casal
- Heriberto G. Batemberg
- Manuel Dondé
- Lorenzo Diaz Gonzalez
- Elvira Gosti
- Chico Mabarak
- José Muñoz
- Luis Santibanez
- Diego Villalba

== Bibliography ==
- Daniel Biltereyst & Roel Vande Winkel. Silencing Cinema: Film Censorship Around the World. Palgrave Macmillan, 2013.
