= La calandria (1933 film) =

1933 film

- Directed by: Fernando de Fuentes
- Release date: 1933
- Running time: 97 minute
- Country: Mexico
- Language: Spanish

La calandria (The Lark/The Canary (Note: The word technically refers to the Chalk-browed mockingbird but English sources give other translations.)) is a 1933 Mexican film. It was directed by Fernando de Fuentes.

It is based on a novel by Rafael Delgado.

== Plot ==
After the death of her mom, Carmen, who goes by the nick name La Calandria, goes to live with Doña Pancha. She meets a young wealthy man, Alberto, who wants to start a romantic relationship with her. Subsequently, Carmen's boyfriend, Gabriel, confronts her. After leaving the city she realizes she is in love with Gabriel.

== Cast ==
- Carmen Guerrero: Carmen (La calandria)
- Paco Berrondo: Gabriel
- Adria Delhort: Malena
- Francisco Zárraga: Alberto
- Julio Villarreal: Priest González
- Emma Roldán
- Dolores Camarillo: Lupe

== Production ==
The film was shot in the México Film studios from 8 July 1933 onwards. Some scenes were shot on location in Orizaba.

A "tragic love story", it is one of the films made by de Fuentes in an intense period of creativity in the early 1930s, these films being called "all exceptional works of the early sound period." The film has also been described as "a traditionalist and provincial melodrama." It is also one of the Mexican films "set in the time of the nineteenth-century hacienda system" and revolving around the character of a charro.

== Release ==
La calandria was produced by Bustillo Orillo through Hispano Mexicano Cinematográfica and released under the banner of Azteca Films. The film premiered in the United States in San Antonio.

== Reception ==
The film, considered an "impeccable adaptation of a costumbrista novel by Rafael Delgado", established the reputation of de Fuentes as a "good director of genre films". A review in the New York Times noted the "dark beauty of Carmen Guerrero".

Among his own production, it was one of the films that de Fuentes loved best.

Abe Yillah Román Alvarado wrote, "However, the filmmaker did not respect the temporal criteria of the novel of manners, which lost its political and moral dimension on the big screen, as well as its local colour."
