= Cruz Diablo =

- Directed by: Fernando de Fuentes
- Release date: 1934
- Running time: 83 minute
- Country: Mexico
- Language: Spanish

Cruz Diablo is a 1934 Mexican film directed by Fernando de Fuentes. The New York Times called it "one of the best films that ever crossed the Rio Grande".

== Plot ==
The film takes place in 16th century New Spain where a masked swordsman, Cruz Diablo, steals from rich people to give to the poor and in doing so marks people with a cross on their foreheads. Cruz Diablo and Inspector Diego will try to prevent Marcela, the daughter of the Count of Luna, from marrying an old marquis by Diego pretending to be the Count. The young woman is actually in love with Captain Carlos, who is imprisoned and tortured to prevent him from marrying Marcela. Captain Carlos' mother goes mad and tells Cruz Diablo what happened.

== Production ==
Cruz Diablo was filmed in the studios of the Compañía Nacional Productora, then located on Paseo de la Reforma, during six weeks starting on September 13, 1934, at a cost of 200,000 pesos. The production was in charge of Paul H. Bush and the Mex-Art company. The script was by director De Fuentes based on a plot by Uruguayan writer Vicente Orona. Editing was by Fernando de Fuentes, Fernando C. Tamayo and Harry Foster, musical direction by Max Urban, sound by Roberto Rodríguez and Joselito Rodríguez, set design by Jorge Fernández, photography by Alex Phillips, wardrobe by Vicente Tostado and A.X. Peña, make-up by Tillillado and costumes by A.X. Peña. Peña, makeup by Tillie Orozco and weapons master Nicolás Reyero who was a general at the Military College and directed the instruction in the use of weapons such as the sword, foil and saber to actors Chato Ortín, René Cardona, Carlos López "Chaflán", Luis G. Ferreiro, Vicente Orona and Indio Fernández.

As part of the set design work, two production assistants contracted smallpox while handling antique clothing and period furniture, so the Ministry of Health declared the film studio quarantined.

The film led to the founding of the production company Mex-Art (Impulsora Cinematográfica), owned by businessmen Pablo Bush and Alfonso Sánchez Tello.
