= Desfile deportivo =

- Directed by: Fernando de Fuentes
- Release date: 1936
- Country: Mexico
- Language: Spanish

Desfile deportivo ("Sports Parade") is a 1936 Mexican film. It was directed by Fernando de Fuentes.
