= La Petróleo =

Spanish vedette (born 1944)

- Born: 1944 (age 81–82); Cádiz, Spain
- Occupation: Vedette

La Petróleo (born 1944) is a Spanish vedette. (Petróleo means "petroleum" in Spanish,)

== Biography ==
La Petróleo was born in Cádiz in 1944, during the dictatorship of Francisco Franco. She began wearing typically feminine clothing at the age of 13, and from an early age she was accepted by her mother, who was single, as well as by the neighbors in the neighborhood. During the 1960s, La Petróleo was a regular customer of the Bar Constancia, one of the few shelters for the LGBT community during the dictatorship, located in the Santa María neighborhood, where she also met the vedette La Salvaora, with whom she formed a long personal and professional relationship. During the Spanish transition she founded the group Las Folclóricas Gaditanas with her partner La Salvaora. Throughout her career she performed in numerous theaters in Spain, even performing in various Latin American countries with artists such as Rocío Dúrcal, Lola Flores or Rocío Jurado.

== Legacy ==
On 30 July 2022, in commemoration of LGBT Pride month, the Cádiz city council paid tribute to La Petróleo and her partner, vedette La Salvaora with a street named after her. The street, which was previously called San Nicolás street, was renamed Artistas Salvaora y Petróleo street.
