= Calumnia =

- Directed by: Francisco Elías Riquelme
- Starring: Carlos Orellana
- Release date: 1939
- Country: Mexico
- Language: Spanish

Calumnia ("Slander") is a 1939 black and white drama Mexican film directed by Francisco Elías Riquelme starring Carlos Orellana.

== Cast ==
- Carlos Orellana
- Ramón Vallarino
- Eduardo Vivas
- Conchita Gentil Arcos
- Consuelo Segarra
- Sara García
- Gilberto González
- Yolanda Terry
- Chel López
- Hernán Vera
