= Max Urban (composer) =

Mexican composer (1882–1949)

- Born: 1882; German Empire
- Died: 1949 (aged 66–67); Mexico
- Occupation: Composer
- Years active: 1933–1949 (film)

Max Urban (1882–1949) was a German-born Mexican composer active in the Mexican Film Industry during its Golden Age. He began his career writing music for radio but his popularity grew when he began composing film scores for films. He was one of a number of foreign-born figures active in Mexican cinema.

== Selected filmography ==
- Sanctuary (1933)
- Gold and Silver (1934)
- Cruz Diablo (1934)
- El fantasma del convento (1934)
- El vuelo de la muerte (1934)
- The Woman of the Port (1934)
- Horse for Horse (1939)
- In the Times of Don Porfirio (1939)
- Every Madman to His Specialty (1939)
- La selva de fuego (1945)
- Gangster's Kingdom (1948)

== Bibliography ==
- Avila, Jacqueline. Cinesonidos: Film Music and National Identity During Mexico's Época de Oro. Oxford University Press, 2019.
- Brill, Olaf (ed.) Expressionism in the Cinema. Edinburgh University Press, 2016.
- Poppe, Nicolas. Alton's Paradox: Foreign Film Workers and the Emergence of Industrial Cinema in Latin America. State University of New York Press, 2021.
