= Las mujeres mandan =

- Directed by: Fernando de Fuentes
- Release date: 1937
- Running time: 89 minute
- Country: Mexico
- Language: Spanish

Las mujeres mandan (Spanish: The Women Rule) is a 1937 Mexican film. It was directed by Fernando de Fuentes.

== Plot ==
Del Diestro plays Isidoro a bored bank teller, who decides to leave his family to follow a young dancer, Chayito, played by Tamayo. Once in Mexico City they become lovers and she asks him to rob the bank he used to work for.

== Cast ==
- Alfredo del Diestro
- Marina Tamayo
- Sara García
- Joaquin Coss
- Manuel Buendia
- Carmen Conde
