= The 9.15 Express =

1941 film

- Directed by: Alejandro Galindo
- Written by: Marco Aurelio Galindo; Alejandro Galindo
- Produced by: Salvador Elizondo
- Starring: Virginia Fábregas; Alfredo del Diestro; Gloria Marín
- Cinematography: Gabriel Figueroa
- Edited by: Emilio Gómez Muriel
- Music by: Raúl Lavista
- Production company: Clasa Films
- Distributed by: Grovas
- Release date: 11 September 1941
- Running time: 90 minutes
- Country: Mexico
- Language: Spanish

The 9.15 Express (Spanish: El rápido de las 9.15) is a 1941 Mexican drama film directed by Alejandro Galindo and starring Virginia Fábregas, Alfredo del Diestro and Gloria Marín. It was shot at the Clasa Studios in Mexico City. The film's sets were designed by the art director Jorge Fernández.

== Synopsis ==
The film focuses on the differing, unconnected lives of various passengers on an express train that crashes that night.

== Cast ==
- Virginia Fábregas as Susana del Mercado
- Alfredo del Diestro as El Incurable
- Gloria Marín as La Infiel
- Miguel Inclán as El Anticuario
- Carlos López Moctezuma as El Chulo
- Alejandro Cobo as El Tuerte
- Enrique García Álvarez as El Marino
- Edmundo Espino as Nacho
- Carmen Conde as La Novia
- Rafael Baledón as El Novio
- Lucila Bowling as Alberta
- Ángel T. Sala as Tío de Rodolfo
- Lupe Inclán as Esposa de Ulíses
- José Torvay as Secuaz de gobernador
- Manuel Dondé as Don Rodrigo
- Conchita Gentil Arcos as Toñita, casera
- Tito Junco as Rodolfo
- José Elías Moreno as Empleado hotel
- Humberto Rodríguez as Felipe, mayordomo
- Salvador Quiroz as Don Ramón, Padrino de boda
- Arturo Soto Rangel as Papá de novia

== See also ==
- Friday the Thirteenth, a 1933 British film with a similar plotline

== Bibliography ==
- Castro, Francisco Peredo. Alejandro Galindo, un alma rebelde en el cine mexicano. Conaculta/imcine, 2000.
