= Marcela (TV series) =

- Genre: Telenovela
- Country of origin: Mexico
- Original language: Spanish

Original release
- Network: Telesistema Mexicano
- Release: 1962

Marcela is a Mexican telenovela produced by Televisa for Telesistema Mexicano in 1962.

== Cast ==
- Bárbara Gil
- Aldo Monti
- Aurora Walker
- Felipe del Castillo
- Josefina Leiner
- Julio Monterde
- Miguel Manzano
- Blanca Sánchez
