= Marihuana (El monstruo verde) =

- Starring: Sara García
- Release date: 1936
- Country: Mexico
- Language: Spanish

Marihuana (El monstruo verde) ('Marijuana (The Green Monster)') is a 1936 Mexican film. It stars Sara García.
