= Beneath the Sky of Mexico =

- Directed by: Fernando de Fuentes
- Release date: 1937
- Running time: 110 minute
- Country: Mexico
- Language: Spanish

Beneath the Sky of Mexico (Spanish: Bajo el cielo de México) is a 1937 Mexican dramedy film. It was directed by Fernando de Fuentes and starred David Silva.
