= Luis Lezama =

Mexican screenwriter and film director

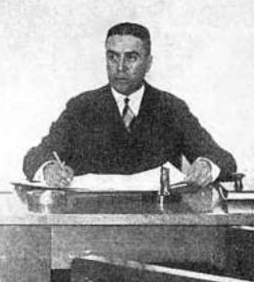
- Occupations: Writer, film producer, director
- Years active: 1919–1953 (film)

Luis Lezama was a Mexican screenwriter and film director.

== Selected filmography ==
=== Director ===
- Tabaré. Traición y Gloria (1919)
- Un Viejo Amor (1919)
- Alas Abiertas, Spread Wings (1921), based on the novel by Alfonso Teja Zabre, re-released in the United States in 1922 as With Wings Outspread
- Los Hijos del Destino (1930)
- The Cemetery of the Eagles (1939)
- Tabaré. Sound version (1946)

== Bibliography ==
- Platas, Alejandro Medrano (1999). Quince directores del cine mexicano: entrevistas [Fifteen Mexican Film Directors: Interviews] (in Spanish). Plaza y Valdes. ISBN 9688566489 – via Internet Archive.
