= El anónimo =

1932 film

- Directed by: Fernando de Fuentes
- Starring: Gloria Iturbe
- Cinematography: Ross Fisher
- Edited by: Aniceto Ortega
- Music by: Manuel Sereijo
- Release date: 1932
- Country: Mexico
- Language: Spanish

El anónimo ("The Anonymous") is a 1932 Mexican film directed by Fernando de Fuentes.

== Plot ==
A drama based on the life of a doctor (Carlos Orellana), who leads a decent life and whose wife (Gloria Iturbe) is an adultress.

== Cast ==
- Gloria Iturbe
- Carlos Orellana
- Julio Villareal
- Gloria Rubio
- Luis G. Barreito
- Elena Valdes
