= Paulino Masip =

Spanish writer (1899–1963)

Paulino Masip Roca
- Born: 11 May 1899; La Granadella
- Died: 21 September 1963 (aged 64); Cholula, Puebla
- Occupation: Director

Paulino Masip Roca (11 May 1899 – 21 September 1963) was a Spanish playwright, screenwriter and novelist. Driven into exile in Mexico in 1939 by the events of the Spanish Civil War, he became involved with the nascent Golden age of Mexican cinema and was the author of over 50 screenplays. Masip is best known for his novel ¨El Diario de Hamlet Garcia¨ which takes place during the Spanish Civil War.

== Selected filmography ==
- When the Stars Travel (1942)
- The Devourer (1946)
- It's Not Enough to Be a Charro (1946)
- Rough But Respectable (1949)
- Jalisco Sings in Seville (1949)
- Doctor on Call (1950)
- Among Lawyers I See You (1951)
- Paco the Elegant (1952)
- The Three Elenas (1954)
- Look What Happened to Samson (1955)
