= The Cemetery of the Eagles =

- Directed by: Luis Lezama
- Written by: Íñigo de Martino; Alfredo Noriega; Rafael M. Saavedra
- Starring: Jorge Negrete; Margarita Mora; José Macip
- Cinematography: Ezequiel Carrasco
- Edited by: Joseph Noriega
- Music by: Alfonso Esparza Oteo
- Production company: Aztla Films
- Distributed by: Aztla Films
- Release date: 1 September 1939
- Running time: 94 minutes
- Country: Mexico
- Language: Spanish

The Cemetery of the Eagles (Spanish: El cementerio de las águilas) is a 1939 Mexican historical war film directed by Luis Lezama and starring Jorge Negrete, Margarita Mora and José Macip. It is set during the Mexican–American War of the 1840s. The film's sets were designed by José Rodríguez Granada. The battles of Churubusco and Chapultepec are recreated for the film. It premiered on 1 September 1939, the same day as the Second World War broke out in Europe. The film's overtly patriotic theme proved very popular at the Mexican box office.

== Cast ==
- Jorge Negrete as Miguel de la Peña
- Margarita Mora as Mercedes de Zúñiga y Miranda
- José Macip as Agustín Melgar
- Silvia Cardell as Ana María de Zúñiga y Miranda
- Alfonso Ruiz Gómez as Rafael Alfaro
- José Ortiz de Zárate as Don Pedro de Zúñiga y Miranda
- Lolo Trillo as Doña Nieves de Zúñiga y Miranda
- Pepe Martínez as Luis Manuel Martínez de Castro
- Miguel Wimer as General Nicolás Bravo
- Ricardo Mondragón as Gral. Monterde
- Adela Jaloma as Elvira
- Miguel Inclán as Gral. Pedro Ma. Anaya
- Manuel Pozos as Jose Ma. Alfaro
- Víctor Velázquez as Juan de la Barrera
- Carlos Mora as Vicente Suárez
- Ricardo Adalid as Juan Escutia
- Paco Castellanos as Francisco Márquez
- Manolo Fábregas as Fernando Montes de Oca
- Crox Alvarado as Capt. Alemán
- Carlos López Aldama as Gen. Santa Ana
- Julio Ahuet as Invitado al baile
- Rafael Baledón as Invitado al baile
- Manuel Dondé as Sirviente
- Tito Junco as Soldado
- Víctor Junco as Soldado
- Paco Martínez as Rejón, el diputado
- Rubén Márquez as Invitado al baile
- Guillermo Rivas
- José Ignacio Rocha as Severiano, cochero

== Bibliography ==
- Wagenen, Michael Van (2012). Remembering the Forgotten War: The Enduring Legacies of the U.S./Mexican War. University of Massachusetts Press. ISBN 978-1-55849-929-4.
