= The House of the Ogre =

- Directed by: Fernando de Fuentes
- Edited by: Charles L. Kimball
- Release date: 1939
- Running time: 110 minute
- Country: Mexico
- Language: Spanish

The House of the Ogre (Spanish: La casa del ogro) is a 1939 Mexican film.
