= Las medias de seda =

- Starring: Carlos Orellana
- Release date: 1956
- Country: Mexico
- Language: Spanish

Las medias de seda ("The Silk Stockings") is a 1956 Mexican film. It stars Carlos Orellana.
