= The Tiger of Yautepec =

- Directed by: Fernando de Fuentes
- Release date: 1933
- Running time: 86 minute
- Country: Mexico
- Language: Spanish

The Tiger of Yautepec (Spanish: El tigre de Yautepec) is a 1933 Mexican film directed by Fernando de Fuentes.

The plot of the film is about a good man and his son who are kidnapped by a bunch of bandits called 'Los Chacales'. Twenty years after, another band of 'banditos' (Los Plateados) terrorizes the region. The leader of 'Los Plateados', El Tigre (Ortiz), is the boy kidnapped 20 years before. El Tigre knows beautiful Dolores (Gallardo) and decides to conquer her... without knowing she's his long-lost sister.
