= Creo en Dios =

- Directed by: Fernando de Fuentes
- Release date: 1941
- Running time: 105 minute
- Country: Mexico
- Language: Spanish

Creo en Dios ("I Believe in God") is a 1941 Mexican film. It was directed by Fernando de Fuentes.
