= La gallina clueca =

- Directed by: Fernando de Fuentes
- Release date: 1941
- Running time: 124 minute
- Country: Mexico
- Language: Spanish

La gallina clueca ("The Broody Hen") is a 1941 Mexican film. It was directed by Fernando de Fuentes.

== Reception ==
El Tiempo was very positive when describing La gallina clueca, saying that its plot had "amazing realism" as well as being "moving" and "interesting".
