= Let's Go with Pancho Villa =

1936 film by Fernando de Fuentes

- DVD cover
- Directed by: Fernando de Fuentes
- Written by: Fernando de Fuentes; Rafael F. Muñoz; Xavier Villaurrutia
- Produced by: Alberto J. Pani
- Starring: Domingo Soler; Antonio R. Frausto; Ramón Vallarino; Manuel Tamés; Carlos López y Valles
- Music by: Silvestre Revueltas
- Release date: 31 December 1936
- Running time: 92 minutes
- Country: Mexico
- Language: Spanish

Let's Go with Pancho Villa (Spanish: Vámonos con Pancho Villa) is a Mexican motion picture directed by Fernando de Fuentes in 1936, the last of the director's Revolution Trilogy, besides El prisionero trece and El compadre Mendoza.

Like the previous films in the trilogy, the film is critical towards propagandist views of the Mexican Revolution by portraying the conflicts as a tragic series of events within Mexican history, emphasized by the characterization of its titular character, general Pancho Villa, being depicted as a cruel leader instead of a national hero.

The movie is thought to have been the first Mexican super-production and led to the bankruptcy of the film company that made it.

== Plot ==
Villa was portrayed by Domingo Soler. Directed by Fernando de Fuentes, the film tells the story of a group of six friends, or rancheros, who hear about the revolution and Villa and decide to join him, only to suffer the cruel reality of war under the command of an apathetic Villa who, despite the observed horror of war, simply does not care about his men.

The movie has two endings: the original ending shows the last surviving friend returning to his home, disenchanted with both Villa and the Revolution.

The second ending, discovered many years later, returns to the same scene ten years later, when an old and weakened Villa tries to recruit the last survivor again; when the father hesitates as he does not want to leave his wife and daughter behind, Villa kills the wife and daughter. The angry father then tries to kill Villa, before another man shoots the father dead. Villa takes the sole survivor, the son, with him.

== Reception ==
The Los Angeles Times Daily Mirror described the movie as "a bleak film of increasingly senseless violence". In a mostly negative review, the author (writing anonymously as they have since left the LA Times) criticizes the lack of character definition in the movie, describes camera movements as "so rough it could be a documentary" and the score to be almost imperceptible several times throughout the movie.

Writing for Slant Magazine, in a more positive review, Aaron Cutler describes the movie's production as "quick, fluid movement, lots of music, smooth unassuming transitions, clean sound, rapid action, and extended colloquial humor". However, he criticizes the dialogue as being typically Hollywood, with dramatic and unrealistic lines that lead the audience to be enamored by the emotion behind the dialogue, rather than the fact.

In honor of the 100th anniversary of the Mexican Revolution, the 2010 New York Film Festival showcased Let's Go with Pancho Villa as one part of a de Fuentes' movie trilogy depicting the Revolution.

== Background ==
Though it was a sizable financial failure when released, interest and professional appreciation of the film experienced a resurgence in the late sixties. Today, it is considered one of the best movies of Mexican cinema, both for its approach to the theme and its technical merits. In 1994, a list of the 100 best films of Mexican cinema was published by Somos magazine: "Let's Go with Pancho Villa" was the number one film on the list.

It stands apart among the many movies made about Villa in that it portrays the man and the Revolution in its cruelty; most other films, like those by Ismael Rodríguez in the 1960s, take an almost idyllic view of both, following the official (government) mythos. "Let's Go with Pancho Villa" was revered for its derisive interpretation of the Mexican government and thematic emphasis on the benefit of peace to the individual citizen.

The movie's soundtrack was composed by Silvestre Revueltas, who makes a cameo appearance. The score was another appeal to critics during the sixties' revival of the film.

The Mexican government contributed the military equipment and soldiers.

== See also ==
- Cinema of Mexico
