= Petroleum (film) =

Petróleo
- Directed by: Fernando Nevot
- Written by: Arturo S. Mom; Antonio Momplet; Fernando de Fuentes
- Release date: 1936
- Running time: 19 minute
- Country: Mexico
- Language: Spanish

Petróleo ("Petroleum") is a 1936 Mexican film directed by Fernando de Fuentes.
