= Allá en el Rancho Grande =

1936 film

- Directed by: Fernando de Fuentes
- Screenplay by: Antonio Guzmán Aguilera (as Guz Aguila); Fernando de Fuentes
- Story by: Antonio Guzmán Aguilera; Luz Guzmán de Arellano
- Starring: Tito Guízar; Esther Fernández; René Cardona
- Cinematography: Gabriel Figueroa
- Edited by: Fernando de Fuentes
- Music by: Lorenzo Barcelata
- Production company: Lombardo Films
- Distributed by: United Artists
- Release date: 6 October 1936 (Mexico)
- Running time: 95 minutes
- Country: Mexico
- Language: Spanish
- Budget: $20,000

Allá en el Rancho Grande (English: Out on the Great Ranch) is a 1936 Mexican romantic drama film directed and co-written by Fernando de Fuentes and starring Tito Guízar and Esther Fernández. The film is considered to be the one that started the Golden Age of Mexican cinema.

== Plot ==
The owner and the general manager of a ranch (Rancho Grande), two good friends, fall in love with the same girl at the same time. The owner tries to 'buy' the girl without knowing she is in love with the manager.

== Cast ==
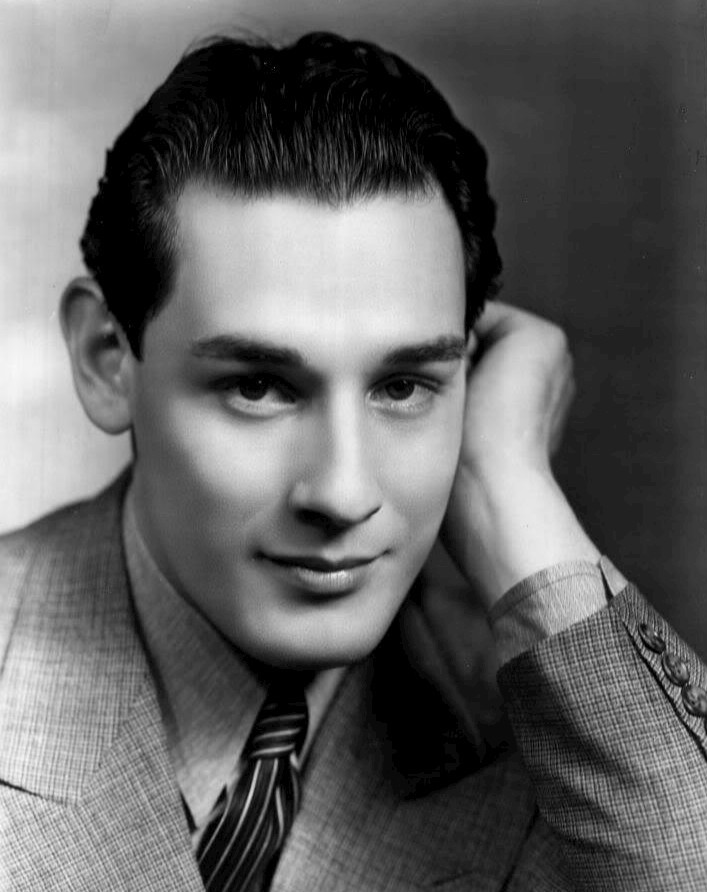
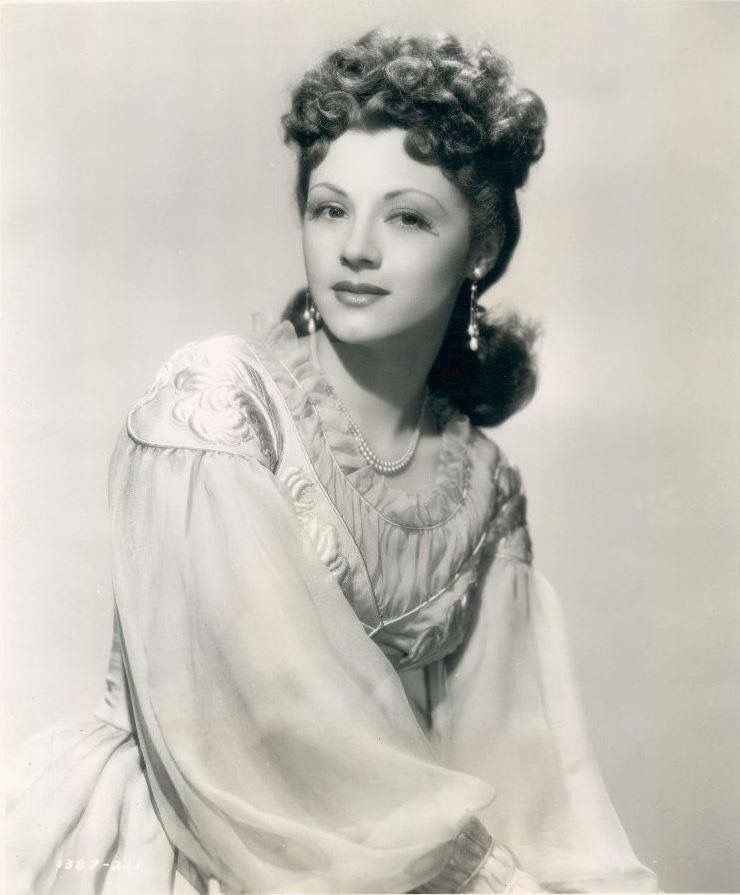
Main stars of the film, Tito Guízar (in 1935) and Esther Fernández (in 1946)
- Tito Guízar as José Francisco
- Esther Fernández as Cruz
- René Cardona as Felipe

== Music ==
- "Allá en el Rancho Grande", sung by Tito Guízar

== Reception ==
The film was a big hit and made a profit of over $400,000.

== Remake ==
In 1949, it was remade by the same director and shot in colour with new principals.
