= Dos cadetes =

- Directed by: René Cardona
- Starring: Sara García
- Production company: Producciones Jorge López Portillo
- Release date: 1938
- Running time: 64 minutes
- Country: Mexico
- Language: Spanish

Dos cadetes ("Two Cadets") is a 1938 black and white Mexican film directed by René Cardona and starring Sara García and Fernando Soler.

== Plot ==
A devoutly religious aunt wants to send her nephew to the seminary. But it all changes when his womanizing uncle sends him to the military instead.

== Cast ==
- Fernando Soler
- Sara García
- María Fernanda Ibáñez
- Carlos López Moctezuma
- José Alcalde
- Julián Soler
