= Emma Roldán =

Mexican character actress

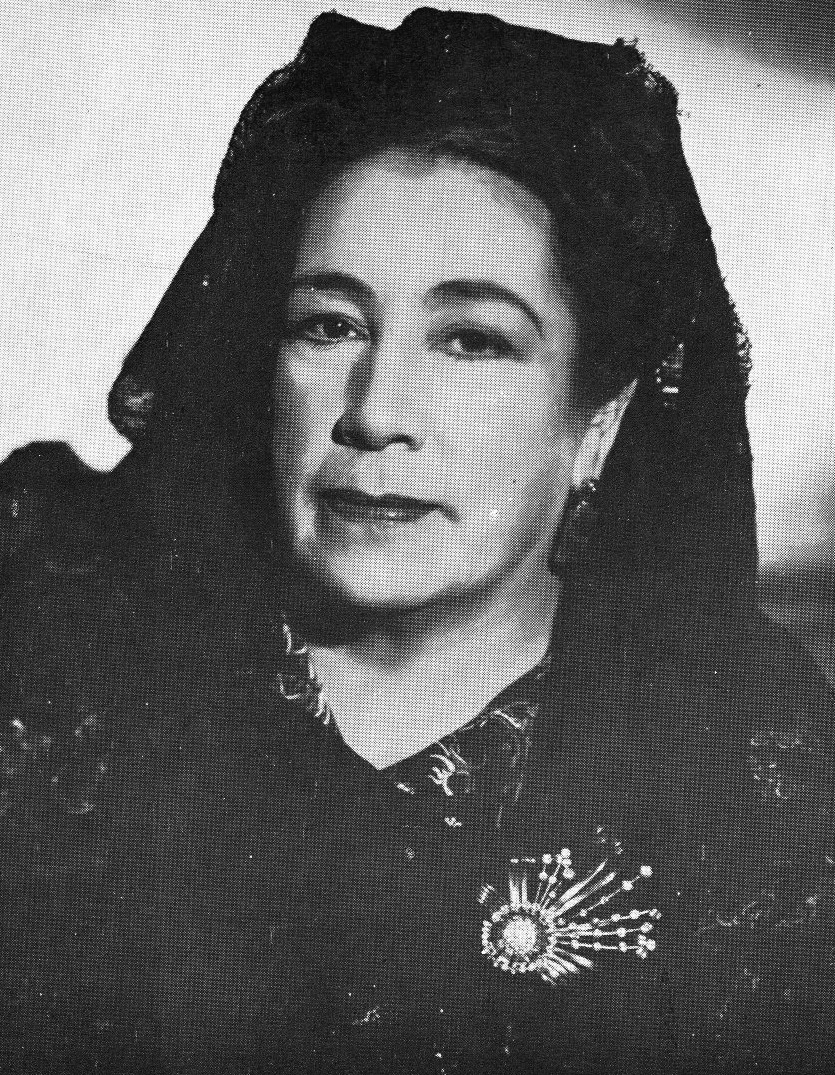
- Roldán in 1954
- Born: Emma Roldán Reyna; February 3, 1893; San Luis Potosí, Mexico
- Died: August 29, 1978 (aged 85); Mexico City, Mexico
- Occupations: Actress, costume designer
- Years active: 1922–1978
- Spouses: Pedro Jesús Ojeda (divorced); Alfredo del Diestro
- Children: 2

Emma Roldán (February 3, 1893 – August 29, 1978) was a Mexican character actress and costume designer. She is remembered as the sharp-tongued, domineering matron of Mexican cinema, and was nominated three times for a Silver Ariel Award.

Acted in some of Fernando de Fuentes most important movies, like El prisionero trece and El compadre Mendoza, both from his Revolution Trilogy, and first Mexican box-office Allá en el Rancho Grande.

== Early life ==
A San Luis Potosí native, Roldán was born Emma Roldán Reyna to hotel owners José María Roldán and Virginia Reyna, the second of four siblings. Her parents' hotel was located in front of the "Teatro de la Paz" in San Luis Potosí, where theatrical companies would perform. It is there where she met her husband Pedro Jesús Ojeda with whom she procreated two children, Emma Ojeda Roldán and Pedro Ojeda Roldán. She and her husband moved to Monterrey, but they would tour across the country, a life she disliked. They later divorced and Roldán relocated to her parents' home in Potosí.

== Selected filmography ==
- El prisionero trece (1933) as Margarita Ramos
- El compadre Mendoza (1934) as the mute
- Allá en el Rancho Grande (1936) as Ángela
- Women of Today (1936)
- These Men (1937)
- Jesusita in Chihuahua (1942) as Tula Tulares de Tulancingo
- Romeo and Juliet (1943)
- Les Misérables (1943)
- Santa (1943)
- The Escape (1944)
- The Hour of Truth (1945)
- Adam, Eve and the Devil (1945)
- The Museum of Crime (1945) as Enfermera
- Dizziness (1946) as Nana Joaquina
- The Queen of the Tropics (1946)
- The Flesh Commands (1948)
- The Newlywed Wants a House (1948)
- Jalisco Fair (1948)
- Rough But Respectable (1949)
- The Masked Tiger (1951)
- Beauty Salon (1951)
- Los hijos de María Morales (1951) as María Morales
- Victims of Divorce (1952)
- A Tailored Gentleman (1954) as Doña Pelos, portera
- The Soldiers of Pancho Villa (1959) as Comadrona
- Beyond All Limits (1959) as Carmela
- Black Skull (1960)
- Chucho el Roto (1960)
- Dangers of Youth (1960)
- Invincible Guns (1960)
- Immediate Delivery (1963)
- El rey del tomate (1963) as Tía Mila
- El miedo no anda en burro (1976) as Doña Paz
- El lugar sin límites (1978) as Ludovinia

== Awards and nominations ==
Year	Ceremony	Award	Result
1947	Ariel Awards	Silver Ariel for Best Actress in a Minor Role for Dizziness	Nominated
1951	Ariel Awards	Silver Ariel for Best Actress in a Minor Role for Vino el remolino y nos levantó	Nominated
1952	Ariel Awards	Silver Ariel for Best Actress in a Minor Role for Cárcel de mujeres	Nominated
1976	Premio ACE	Cinema - Best Supporting Actress for The Passion of Berenice	Won
