= Gold and Silver =

- Directed by: Ramón Peón
- Written by: Ladislao López Negrete; Ramón Peón
- Starring: Carmen Guerrero; Adolfo Girón; Alfredo del Diestro
- Cinematography: Ross Fisher
- Edited by: Ramón Peón
- Music by: Max Urban (composer)
- Production company: Hispano Mexicana Cinematográfica
- Release date: 31 May 1934
- Running time: 85 minutes
- Country: Mexico
- Language: Spanish

Gold and Silver (Spanish:Oro y plata) is a 1934 Mexican drama film directed by Ramón Peón and starring Carmen Guerrero, Adolfo Girón and Alfredo del Diestro.

The film's art direction was by Fernando A. Rivero.

== Cast ==
- Carmen Guerrero as Maruca
- Adolfo Girón as Rubén del Castillo
- Alfredo del Diestro as Don Ridrigo
- Domingo Soler as Juan Antonio
- Julio Villarreal as Don Ricardo del Castillo
- Beatriz Ramos as Violeta
- Antonio R. Frausto as Lencho
- Dolores Camarillo as Pareja de Lencho
- Paco Martinez as Pedro, criado
- Pepe Martínez as Juan
- Manuel Tamés as Basilio
- Pedro Nava F. as Cura
- Fabio Acevedo as Simón
- A.L. Rocha as Colás
- Alfonso Sánchez Tello
- Ricardo Marrero
- El Trío Maya
- Chel López
- Carmen Torreblanca

== Bibliography ==
- Emilio García Riera. Historia documental del cine mexicano: 1929-1937. Universidad de Guadalajara, 1992.
