= Alfredo del Diestro =

Chilean actor and film director

- Born: 7 October 1885; Valparaíso, Chile
- Died: 1951 (aged 65–66)
- Occupations: Actor and director
- Years active: 1922–1949 (film)

Alfredo del Diestro (7 October 1885 – 1951) was a Chilean actor and film director.

== Selected filmography ==
- María (1922)
- Revolution (1933)
- Prisoner 13 (1933)
- Godfather Mendoza (1934)
- The Crying Woman (1933)
- Nothing More Than a Woman (1934)
- Juarez and Maximillian (1934)
- Gold and Silver (1934)
- Heroic Silence (1935)
- Las mujeres mandan (1937)
- Neither Blood Nor Sand (1941)
- The 9.15 Express (1941)
- Father Morelos (1943)
- Adam, Eve and the Devil (1945)

== Bibliography ==
- Charles Ramírez Berg. The Classical Mexican Cinema: The Poetics of the Exceptional Golden Age Films. University of Texas Press, 2015.
