= Prisoner 13 =

- Directed by: Fernando de Fuentes
- Written by: Miguel Ruiz; Fernando de Fuentes
- Cinematography: Ross Fisher
- Edited by: Aniceto Ortega
- Release date: 1933
- Running time: 76 minute
- Country: Mexico
- Language: Spanish

Prisoner 13 (Spanish: El prisionero trece) is a 1933 Mexican film. It was directed by Fernando de Fuentes.

== Plot ==
The film is a part of the trilogy of films made by Fernando Fuentes concerning the Mexican Revolution, the other two films being El compadre Mendoza (1934) and Vámonos con Pancho Villa (1936).

The film centers on the drunkard Colonel Carrasco, whose wife Marta leaves him taking his young son. The child, Juan, grows into an admirable and well-mannered young man. Having been promoted to a higher rank of power amidst the Mexican Revolution, the indulgent and corrupt Colonel accepts a bribe to free a revolutionary, Felipe Martinez, from his prison. Martinez has been sentenced to execution at the hands of a firing squad. Carrasco asks to have the revolutionary replaced by absolutely anyone. In a twist of fate, that anyone turns out to be his own long lost son Juan. Upon receiving this news, Marta races to the prison and explains the predicament to Carrasco. He subsequently desperately attempts to prevent the gunning down of his son by his very own government officials.
