= Fernando de Fuentes =

Mexican film director

- Born: December 13, 1894; Veracruz, Veracruz, Mexico
- Died: July 4, 1958 (aged 63); Mexico City, Mexico
- Occupations: Film director, screenwriter, film producer
- Years active: 1932–1958
- Notable work: El prisionero trece (1933); El compadre Mendoza (1933); El fantasma del convento (1934); Allá en el Rancho Grande (1936); Vámonos con Pancho Villa (1936); Doña Bárbara (1943)

Fernando de Fuentes Carrau (Note: In this Mexican name, the surname is de Fuentes and the second or maternal family name is Carrau.) (December 13, 1894 – July 4, 1958) was a Mexican film director, considered a pioneer in the film industry worldwide. He is perhaps best known for directing the films El prisionero trece, El compadre Mendoza, and Vámonos con Pancho Villa, all part of his Revolution Trilogy on the Mexican Revolution.

== Biography ==
=== Early life and education ===
De Fuentes Carrau was born in Veracruz on December 13, 1894, and spent part of his adolescence in Monterrey. He studied philosophy and engineering at Tulane University in New Orleans.

=== Career ===
On his return to Mexico he worked as executive assistant of Venustiano Carranza during the Mexican Revolution. After his marriage in 1919, he moved to Washington, D.C., and worked at the Mexican Embassy. Back in Mexico, he wrote poetry and undertook journalism as a hobby, and worked in the film industry in exhibition. In 1932 he made his first film, El Anónimo, and in the same year Una Vida por Otra, in 1933 El prisionero trece, La calandria, El Tigre de Yautepec and El compadre Mendoza, considered one of his masterpieces, in the Mexican Revolution Trilogy, (El Compadre Mendoza, Vámonos con Pancho Villa and El prisionero trece).

In 1934 he directed El Fantasma del Convento, and Cruz Diablo. In 1935 he made Vámonos Pancho Villa, and La Familia Dressel, in 1936 Las Mujeres Mandan and one of the greatest hits in the history of the Mexican cinema, Alla en el Rancho Grande – a film that developed a complete new genre the "comedia ranchera", with this film he was awarded the Medalla al Mérito Cinematográfico by President Lázaro Cárdenas. This film also won first place at the Venice Film Festival in 1938. It was the first International award won by a Mexican film.

Described as "the Mexican John Ford" (New York Times), Fernando de Fuentes was by far the most talented filmmaker of early Mexican sound cinema. This tragic trilogy set during the Mexican Revolution was possibly his greatest achievement. Prisoner 13 (1933, 76 mins.) concerns a son who pays for his father's faults and a desperate mother who tries at all costs to save her son's life. El Compadre Mendoza (1933, 85 mins.) examines the corrupted ideals of the Revolution by way of an opportunistic landowner, who must choose between remaining loyal to a general in Zapata's army (and facing financial ruin) or saving his own skin. Lastly, Fuentes' sweeping epic Let's Go with Pancho Villa (1936, 92 mins.) follows the adventures of six young men who leave their rural homes to join Pancho Villa's army, enduring hardship, loss, and disillusionment over the Revolution in the process. Shot by Gabriel Figueroa (The Fugitive), one of the world's most gifted black and white cinematographers.

His filmography covers almost all the different genres from drama, comedy, horror, family, historical, to classics and documentaries.

=== Marriage and children ===
De Fuentes married Magdalena Reyes Moran in San Antonio, Texas, in 1919. They had two children, Magdalena and Fernando.

=== Death ===
Fernando de Fuentes died on July 4, 1958, in Mexico City, aged 63.

== Filmography ==
=== Director ===
- El anónimo (1932)
- El prisionero trece (1933)
- La calandria (1933)
- The Tiger of Yautepec (1933)
- El compadre Mendoza (1934)
- El fantasma del convento (1934)
- Cruz Diablo (1934)
- La familia Dressel (1935)
- Petróleo (1936)
- Desfile deportivo (1936)
- Allá en el Rancho Grande (1936)
- Vámonos con Pancho Villa (1936)
- Las mujeres mandan (1937)
- Bajo el cielo de México (1937)
- La Zandunga (1938)
- La casa del ogro (1939)
- Papacito lindo (1939)
- Allá en el trópico (1940)
- El jefe máximo (1940)
- Creo en Dios (1941)
- La gallina clueca (1941)
- ¡Así se quiere en Jalisco! (1942)
- Doña Bárbara (1943)
- La mujer sin alma (1944)
- El Rey se divierte (1944)
- Hasta que perdió Jalisco (1945)
- La selva de fuego (1945)
- Esperanza (1946)
- The Devourer (1946)
- Allá en el Rancho Grande (1949)
- Jalisco Sings in Seville (1949)
- Hipólito, el de Santa (1950)
- Por la puerta falsa (1950)
- Crimen y castigo (1951)
- Los hijos de María Morales (1952)
- Canción de cuna (1953)
- Tres citas con el destino (1954)

=== Producer ===
- La familia Dressel (1935)
- Petróleo (1936)
- Allá en el Rancho Grande (1936)
- La casa del ogro (1939)
- Papacito lindo (1939)
- Allá en el trópico (1940)
- El jefe máximo (1940)
- Creo en Dios (1941)
- ¡Así se quiere en Jalisco! (1942)
- Doña Bárbara (1943)
- El rey se divierte (1944)
- La devoradora (1946)
- Si Adelita se fuera con otro (1948)
- Allá en el Rancho Grande (1949)
- Jalisco canta en Sevilla (1949)
- El colmillo de Buda (1949)
- Las tandas del principal (1949)
- No me defiendas compadre (1949)
- Hipólito, el de Santa (1950)
- Doctor on Call (1950)
- Por la puerta falsa (1950)
- Corazón de fiera (1951)(productor ejecutivo)
- Entre abogados te veas (1951) (productor ejecutivo)
- Crimen y castigo (1951)
- Paco the Elegant (1952)
- Las locuras de Tin-Tan (1952)
- Los hijos de María Morales (1952)
- Canción de cuna (1953)
- La intrusa (1954)
- Escuela de vagabundos (1955)
- Las aventuras de Pito Pérez (1957)
- Que me toquen las golondrinas (1957)
- La sombra del otro (1957)
- Escuela para suegras (1958)
- A Thousand and One Nights (1958)
- ¡Paso a la juventud..! (1958)
- Amor se dice cantando (1959)
- Farewell to Marriage (1968)

=== Writer ===
- Una vida por otra (1932)
- El anónimo (1933)
- La llorona (1933)
- El prisionero trece (1933)
- La calandria (1933) (guionista y dialogo)
- El tigre de Yautepec (1933)
- El compadre Mendoza (1934) (guionista)
- El fantasma del convento (1934)
- Cruz Diablo (1934)
- La familia Dressel (1935)
- Petróleo (1936)
- Allá en el Rancho Grande (1936) (guionista)
- Vámonos con Pancho Villa (1936) (adaptation)
- Las mujeres mandan (1937)
- Bajo el cielo de México (1937)
- La zandunga (1938) (guionista y dialogo)
- La casa del ogro (1939)
- Allá en el trópico (1940)
- El jefe máximo (1940)
- Creo en Dios (1941)
- La gallina clueca (1941)
- ¡Así se quiere en Jalisco! (1942)
- Doña Bárbara (1943)
- La mujer sin alma (1944)
- El rey se divierte (1944)
- Hasta que perdió Jalisco (1945)
- La selva de fuego (1945) (guionista)
- La devoradora (1946)
- Allá en el Rancho Grande (1949) (adaptation y dialogo)
- Jalisco canta en Sevilla (1949)
- Hipólito, el de Santa (1950) (guionista)
- Por la puerta falsa (1950)
- Casa de vecindad (1951)
- La hija del ministro (1952)
- Escuela de vagabundos (1955) (adaptation)
- Las aventuras de Pito Pérez (1957) (adaptation)
- Que me toquen las golondrinas (1957)
- La sombra del otro (1957) (adaptation)
- Las mil y una noches (1958) (adaptation)
- Aladino y la lámpara maravillosa (1958)
- Angustia de un secreto (1959)
- La casa del terror (1960) (sin créditos)
- Face of the Screaming Werewolf (1964) (secuencias del lobo)
- El dinero tiene miedo (1970)

=== Editor ===
- Águilas frente al sol (1932)
- La calandria (1933)
- El tigre de Yautepec (1933)
- El compadre Mendoza (1934)
- El fantasma del convento (1934)
- Cruz Diablo (1934)
- La familia Dressel (1935)
- Allá en el Rancho Grande (1936)
