= Carlos López y Valles =

- Born: 4 November 1887; Durango, Mexico
- Died: 13 February 1942 (aged 54); Tapachula, Mexico
- Other name: Carlos Chaflan Lopez y Valles
- Occupations: Actor and Singer
- Years active: 1930–1942 (film)

Carlos López y Valles (4 November 1887 – 13 February 1942), better known as Chaflán, was a Mexican comedian, singer, and film actor of the Golden Age of Mexican cinema. He should not be mistaken for Carlos López Moctezuma, another Mexican actor.

== Selected filmography ==
- The Treasure of Pancho Villa (1935)
- Women of Today (1936)
- Let's Go with Pancho Villa (1936)
- While Mexico Sleeps (1938)
- Guadalajara (1943)

== Bibliography ==
- Herzberg, Bob. Revolutionary Mexico on Film: A Critical History, 1914–2014. McFarland, 2014.
