= List of Mexican films of 1951 =

A list of the films produced in Mexico in 1951 (see 1951 in film):

== 1951 ==
Title	Director	Cast	Genre	Notes
1951
The Absentee	Julio Bracho	Rosita Quintana, Arturo de Córdova, Andrea Palma	Drama	Entered into the 1952 Cannes Film Festival
Among Lawyers I See You	Adolfo Fernández Bustamante	Armando Calvo, Carmen Montejo, Isabel del Puerto	Drama	
Arrabalera	Joaquín Pardavé	Marga López, Fernando Fernández, Freddy Fernández	Comedy	
Beauty Salon	José Díaz Morales	Emilio Tuero, Rita Macedo, Andrea Palma	Drama	
The Chicken Hawk	Rogelio A. González	Pedro Infante, Lilia Prado, Antonio Badú	Western comedy	
Crime and Punishment	Fernando de Fuentes	Roberto Cañedo, Lilia Prado, Elda Peralta	Crime drama	
The Cry of the Flesh	Zacarías Gómez Urquiza	Fernando Soler, Rosario Granados, Gustavo Rojo	Drama	
Daughter of Deceit	Luis Buñuel	Fernando Soler, Alicia Caro, Rubén Rojo	Comedy drama	
Desired	Roberto Gavaldón	Dolores del Río, Jorge Mistral, Anabel Gutiérrez	Drama	
Doña Perfecta	Alejandro Galindo	Dolores del Río, Esther Fernández, Carlos Navarro	Drama	Based on the Benito Pérez Galdós novel
Engagement Ring	Emilio Gómez Muriel	Martha Roth, David Silva, Carmen Montejo	Drama	
From the Can-Can to the Mambo	Chano Urueta	Joaquín Pardavé, Abel Salazar, Rosita Fornés	Musical	
Full Speed Ahead	Ismael Rodríguez	Pedro Infante, Luis Aguilar, Aurora Segura	Comedy	
A Galician Dances the Mambo	Emilio Gómez Muriel	Niní Marshall, Joaquín Pardavé, Silvia Pinal	Comedy	
Get Your Sandwiches Here	Juan Bustillo Oro	Sara García, Meche Barba, Carlos Orellana	Drama	
Girls in Uniform	Alfredo B. Crevenna	Irasema Dilián, Marga López, Alicia Caro	Drama	
Good Night, My Love	Fernando A. Rivero	Ramón Armengod, Emilia Guiú, Gloria Ríos	Drama	
The Guests of the Marquesa	Jaime Salvador	Amalia Aguilar, Ramón Armengod, Carlota Solares	Musical comedy	
In the Flesh	Alberto Gout	Rosa Carmina, Crox Alvarado, Rubén Rojo	Drama	
In the Palm of Your Hand	Roberto Gavaldón	Arturo de Córdova, Leticia Palma, Carmen Montejo	Drama	
Lost Love	Miguel Morayta	Amalia Aguilar, Víctor Junco, Eduardo Alcaraz	Drama	
The Lovers	Fernando A. Rivero	Emilia Guiú, David Silva, Luis Aldás	Drama	
El revoltoso	Gilberto Martínez Solares	Tin Tan, Rebeca Iturbide, Perla Aguiar	Comedy	
Love for Sale	Joaquin Pardave	Meche Barba, Fernando Fernández, Óscar Pulido	Comedy	
Love Was Her Sin	Rogelio A. González	Elsa Aguirre, Jorge Mistral, Alma Rosa Aguirre	Drama	
Maria Islands	Emilio Fernández	Pedro Infante, Rosaura Revueltas, Jaime Fernández	Drama	
The Masked Tiger	Zacarías Gómez Urquiza	Luis Aguilar, Flor Silvestre, Aurora Segura	Western	
La bienamada	Emilio Fernández	Columba Domínguez, Roberto Cañedo		
La estatua de carne	Chano Urueta	Elsa Aguirre, Miguel Torrúco, Silvia Pinal		
My General's Women	Ismael Rodríguez	Pedro Infante, Lilia Prado, Chula Prieto	Drama	
My Goddaughter's Difficulties	Fernando Méndez	Rafael Baledón, Carmelita González, Domingo Soler	Comedy	
My Husband	Jaime Salvador	Armando Calvo, Rita Macedo, Dalia Íñiguez	Comedy	
My Wife Is Not Mine	Fernando Soler	Fernando Soler, Alicia Caro, Luis Aldás	Comedy	
Oh Darling! Look What You've Done!	Gilberto Martínez Solares	Tin-Tan, Rebeca Iturbide, Marcelo Chávez	Comedy	
Peregrina	Chano Urueta	Jorge Mistral	Drama	
Port of Temptation	René Cardona	Emilia Guiú, Ramón Armengod, Gloria Ríos	Crime drama	
Radio Patrol	Ernesto Cortázar	David Silva, Emilia Guiú, Arturo Soto Rangel	Crime drama	
Sensuality	Alberto Gout	Ninón Sevilla, Fernando Soler, Andrea Palma	Crime drama	
Serenade in Acapulco	Chano Urueta	Martha Roth, Roberto Romaña, Óscar Pulido	Musical comedy	
She and I	Miguel M. Delgado	Pedro Armendáriz, Miroslava, Miguel Aceves Mejía	Comedy	
The Shrew	Fernando Méndez	Rosita Arenas, Domingo Soler, Carlos López Moctezuma	Comedy	
El Siete Machos	Miguel M. Delgado	Cantinflas, Alma Rosa Aguirre, Delia Magaña, Miguel Ángel Ferriz		
Stolen Paradise	Julio Bracho	Arturo de Córdova, Irasema Dilián, María Douglas	Drama	
Streetwalker	Matilde Landeta	Miroslava, Ernesto Alonso, Elda Peralta	Drama	
El suavecito	Fernando Méndez	Víctor Parra Aurora Segura		
Susana	Luis Buñuel	Rosita Quintana, Fernando Soler		
Tenement House	Juan Bustillo Oro	David Silva, Meche Barba, Andrés Soler	Drama	
They Say I'm a Communist	Alejandro Galindo	Adalberto Martínez, María Luisa Zea, Miguel Manzano	Comedy	
Vìctimas del Pecado	Emilio Fernández	Ninón Sevilla, Rodolfo Acosta, Rita Montaner	Drama	
What Has That Woman Done to You?	Ismael Rodríguez	Pedro Infante, Luis Aguilar, Rosita Arenas	Comedy	
What Idiots Men Are	Juan Orol	Rosa Carmina, Víctor Junco, Aurora Segura	Drama	
Women of the Theatre	René Cardona	Emilia Guiú, Rosita Fornés, María Victoria	Musical	
Woman Without Tears	Alfredo B. Crevenna	Libertad Lamarque, Marga López, Ernesto Alonso	Drama	
Women Without Tomorrow	Tito Davison	Leticia Palma, Carmen Montejo, Andrea Palma	Drama	
Women's Prison	Miguel M. Delgado	Sara Montiel, Miroslava, Katy Jurado	Drama	
A Gringo Girl in Mexico	Julián Soler	Antonio Badú, Martha Roth, Óscar Pulido		
Canasta uruguaya	René Cardona	Abel Salazar, Alma Rosa Aguirre, Jorge Reyes		
Doña Clarines	Eduardo Ugarte	Sara García, Ricardo Adalid, Lupe Carriles		
El papelerito	Agustín P. Delgado	Sara García, Domingo Soler		
History of a Heart	Julio Bracho	Rosario Granados, Albert Carrier, Alma Delia Fuentes		
Kill Me Because I'm Dying!	Ismael Rodríguez	Germán Valdés, Yolanda Montes		
La duquesa del Tepetate	Juan José Segura	Sara García, Abel Salazar, Gloria Lozano		
La reina del mambo	Ramón Pereda	María Antonieta Pons, Sara García, Gustavo Rojo		
Los enredos de una gallega	Fernando Soler	Niní Marshall, Fernando Soto		
María Cristina	Ramón Pereda	María Antonieta Pons, Carlos Cores		
Negro es mi color	Tito Davison	Marga López, Rita Montaner	Musical	
Road of Hell	Miguel Morayta	Pedro Armendáriz, Leticia Palma, Wolf Ruvinskis		
Stronghold	Steve Sekely	Veronica Lake, Zachary Scott, Arturo de Córdova		
We Maids	Zacarías Gómez Urquiza	Alma Rosa Aguirre, Domingo Soler, Rubén Rojo		
¡... Y murió por nosotros!	Joselito Rodríguez	Eduardo Arozamena, Jorge Arriaga, Felipe de Alba		

== See also ==
- 1951 in Mexico
