= Que Dios me perdone =

- Directed by: Tito Davison
- Written by: Tito Davison; José Revueltas; Xavier Villaurrutia
- Starring: María Félix; Fernando Soler; Julián Soler
- Cinematography: Alex Phillips
- Edited by: Mario González
- Music by: Manuel Esperón
- Production company: Cinematográfica Filmex S.A
- Release date: 24 March 1948 (Mexico)
- Running time: 97 min
- Country: Mexico
- Language: Spanish

Que Dios me perdone (English title: May God Forgive Me), is a 1948 Mexican film produced by Cinematográfica Filmex S.A and directed and co-written by Tito Davison, starring María Félix, Fernando Soler and Julián Soler.

== Plot ==
Lena is a sinister spy who manages to seduce several wealthy men to obtain information. Meanwhile, unexplained deaths happen that only a psychologist will discover.

== Cast ==
- María Félix as Sofía / Lena Kovach
- Fernando Soler as Don Esteban Velasco
- Julián Soler as Dr. Mario Colina Vázquez
- Tito Junco as Ernesto Serrano
- Ernesto Vilches as Medina
- Carmelita González as Alicia
- Fanny Schiller as Olga
- José Baviera as Luigi Martino
- Pepe Martínez as Jeweler
- Armando Velasco as Sebastián, the butler
- Nicolás Rodríguez as Martínez
- Hernán Vera as Inn owner
- Victorio Blanco as Bellboy
- Paco Martínez as Notary public
- Daniel Arroyo as Man asking Esteban (uncredited)
- Fernando Casanova as Fernando (uncredited)
- Gloria Lozano as Empleada hotel (uncredited)
- Ignacio Peón as Transeúnte (uncredited)
- Joaquín Roche as Gerente hotel (uncredited)
