= Dona Mariquita of My Heart =

1953 film by Joaquín Pardavé

- Directed by: Joaquín Pardavé
- Written by: José Muñoz Román (play); Ramón Obón
- Produced by: Gregorio Walerstein
- Starring: Joaquín Pardavé; Silvia Pinal; Fernando Fernández
- Cinematography: Agustín Martínez Solares
- Edited by: Rafael Ceballos
- Music by: Sergio Guerrero
- Production company: Cinematográfica Filmex
- Release date: 5 June 1953
- Running time: 100 minutes
- Country: Mexico
- Language: Spanish

Dona Mariquita of My Heart (Spanish: Doña Mariquita de mi corazón) is a 1953 Mexican comedy film directed by Joaquín Pardavé and starring Pardavé, Silvia Pinal and Fernando Fernández.

== Cast ==
- Joaquín Pardavé as Ubaldo
- Silvia Pinal as Paz Alegre
- Fernando Fernández as Adolfo; Javier
- Perla Aguiar as Mari Tere
- Agustín Isunza as Leo
- Óscar Pulido as Rogelio
- Fanny Schiller as doña Micaela
- Alfredo Varela as José Luis
- Gloria Mange as Marisa
- Emperatriz Carvajal as doña Mariquita
- José Chávez
- María Herrero as Rosa, sirvienta
- Francisco Llopis
- Carlos Robles Gil as Hombre bailando en cabaret
- Manuel Trejo Morales
- Hernán Vera

== Bibliography ==
- Rogelio Agrasánchez. Beauties of Mexican Cinema. Agrasanchez Film Archive, 2001.
