= Pepe Martínez (actor) =

Mexican actor

- Born: José Martínez Grifell; 9 March 1905; Mexico City, Mexico
- Died: 13 November 1955 (aged 50); Mexico City, Mexico
- Other name: Pepito Martínez
- Occupation: Actor
- Years active: 1933–1955

José Martínez Grifell (9 March 1905 – 13 November 1955), known professionally as Pepe Martínez or Pepito Martínez, was a Mexican stage and film actor. He worked primarily in supporting roles during the Golden Age of Mexican cinema.

== Life and career ==
Martínez was born in Mexico City and was the son of actress Prudencia Grifell. He also performed in the theatre. Archival research concerning the company of Catalan actress Assumpció Casals identifies Martínez as its principal comic actor.

In film, Martínez generally portrayed supporting characters. Among his credited roles were Luis Manuel Martínez de Castro in The Cemetery of the Eagles, Curro in The Road to Sacramento, a jeweller in Que Dios me perdone, Pedro Olmos in Los viejos somos así, and a priest in Dos pesos dejada.

He appeared alongside Maruja Grifell in the 1949 comedy La Panchita. One of his later screen appearances was in Luis Buñuel's La ilusión viaja en tranvía.

== Selected filmography ==
- Gold and Silver (1934)
- Malditas sean las mujeres (1936)
- Por mis pistolas (1938)
- La Valentina (1938)
- The Cemetery of the Eagles (1939)
- Caminito alegre (1944)
- The Road to Sacramento (1946)
- Que Dios me perdone (1948)
- The Flesh Commands (1948)
- Corner Stop (1948)
- The Genius (1948)
- Los viejos somos así (1948)
- Negra consentida (1949)
- The Magician (1949)
- Dos pesos dejada (1949)
- Angels of the Arrabal (1949)
- The Doorman (1950)
- Over the Waves (1950)
- María Montecristo (1951)
- They Say I'm a Communist (1951)
- Women Without Tomorrow (1951)
- Full Speed Ahead (1951)
- Sacrificed Women (1952)
- Forbidden Fruit (1953)
- The Unfaithful (1953)
- The Three Elenas (1954)
- Take Me in Your Arms (1954)

== Bibliography ==
- García Riera, Emilio. Historia documental del cine mexicano: 1945. Ediciones Era, 1969.
