= Forgotten Faces =

Forgotten Faces may refer to:

- Forgotten Faces (1928 film), American silent drama
- Forgotten Faces (1936 film), American sound remake of above
- Forgotten Faces (1946 film), Greek film
- Forgotten Faces (1952 film), Mexican film
- "Forgotten Faces" (song), by American heavy metal band Avenged Sevenfold
