= Irma Vila =

Musical artist (1916–1993)

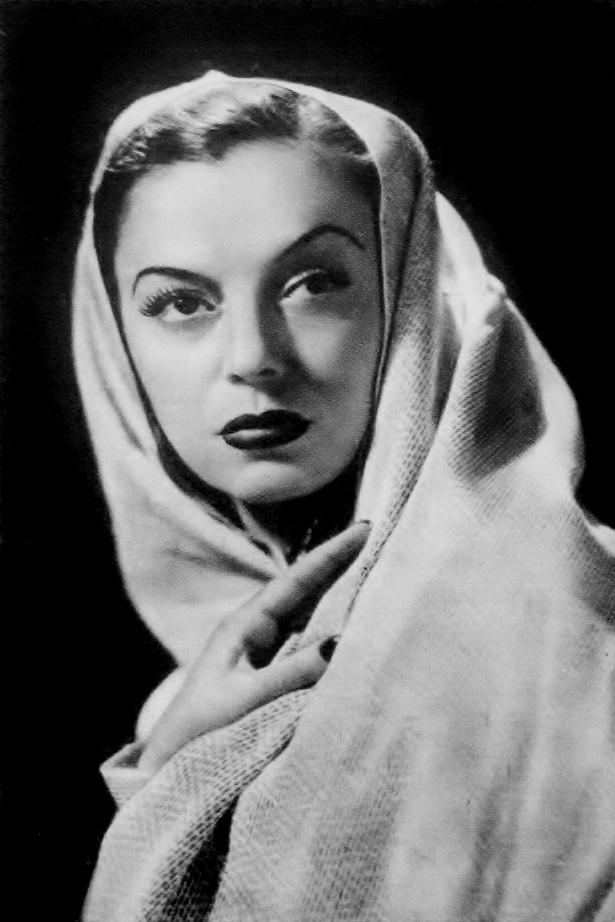
- Born: Armida Rojo Gamboa; 14 September 1916; San Blas, Sinaloa, Mexico
- Died: 22 May 1993 (aged 76); Mexico City, Mexico
- Occupation(s): Singer, actress
- Musical career
- Genres: Ranchera
- Instrument: Vocals

Armida Rojo Gamboa (14 September 1916 – 22 May 1993), known by her stage name Irma Vila, was a Mexican singer and actress.

She became famous in the 1940s and was one of the first female performers of ranchera music. Her extraordinary falsetto (falsete in Spanish) earned her the nickname "La Reina del Falsete" (The Queen of Falsetto). She made several successful tours of Spain, France, and North Africa. Upon her return to Mexico, she starred the film Canta y no llores... (1949) and sang songs in Canasta uruguaya (1951).
