= The Little House (1950 film) =

1950 film by Roberto Gavaldón

- Directed by: Roberto Gavaldón
- Written by: José Revueltas; Roberto Gavaldón
- Produced by: Gregorio Walerstein
- Starring: Dolores del Río; Roberto Cañedo; Miroslava
- Cinematography: Alex Phillips
- Edited by: Rafael Ceballos
- Music by: Antonio Díaz Conde
- Production company: Filmex
- Release date: 9 February 1950
- Running time: 115 minutes
- Country: Mexico
- Language: Spanish

The Little House (Spanish: La casa chica) is a 1950 Mexican drama film directed by Roberto Gavaldón and starring Dolores del Río, Roberto Cañedo and Miroslava. It was shot at the Churubusco Studios in Mexico City. The film's sets were designed by the art director Jorge Fernández.

== Plot ==
Fernando Mendoza, an eminent doctor, falls in love with Amalia, a sweet woman that fully reciprocates. But Fernando is engaged to marry Lucila, a frivolous woman who uses a thousand wiles to keep him.

Over the years, the stormy relationship between Fernando and Amalia becomes more complicated. She finishes her medical studies and becomes a very prestigious scientist. Amalia agrees to become Fernando's lover and collaborates with him in his laboratory as his "assistant". They share an apartment, "the house of the other", where they enjoy their pure and sincere love.

== Cast ==
- Dolores del Río as Amalia Estrada
- Roberto Cañedo as Dr. Fernando Mendoza
- Miroslava as Lucila del Castillo
- Domingo Soler as Professor Alfaro
- María Douglas as Nelly Gutiérrez
- José Elías Moreno as Carlos Villanueva
- Julio Villarreal as Señor del Castillo
- Arturo Soto Rangel as Dr. Carrasco
- Nicolás Rodríguez as Sacerdote
- Enriqueta Reza as Sirvienta de Nelly
- Manuel de la Vega as Fernando Jr. niño
- Raúl Farell as Fernando Mendoza Jr.
- Raúl Meraz as Invitado a fiesta
