= Forgotten Faces (1952 film) =

1952 film

- Directed by: Julio Bracho
- Written by: Neftali Beltrán (story and adaptation); Julio Bracho (story and adaptation)
- Produced by: Salvador Elizondo (producer); Alfonso Patiño Gómez (executive producer)
- Starring: Libertad Lamarque; Julián Soler; Alicia Caro; Ramón Gay
- Cinematography: Alex Phillips
- Edited by: Jorge Bustos
- Music by: Raúl Lavista
- Production company: Clasa Films Mundiales
- Release date: 24 July 1952 (Mexico)
- Running time: 113 minutes
- Country: Mexico
- Language: Spanish

Forgotten Faces (Spanish: Rostros olvidados) is a 1952 Mexican drama film directed by Julio Bracho and starring Libertad Lamarque, Julián Soler, Alicia Caro and Ramón Gay.

== Plot ==
Rosario Velázquez (Libertad Lamarque) is a singer who has an affair with Roberto Casahonda (Julián Soler), a married man, with whom she has a daughter. After accidentally leaving her daughter behind on a train, Rosario believes the girl dead when the train crashes, making Rosario lose her sanity and leading to her being committed to a psychiatric institution. Upon leaving the institution, Rosario is reunited with the now-widowed Roberto, who reveals the truth to her: Their daughter is alive, and Roberto raised her alongside the two daughters of his marriage. Rosario tries to discover which of the three is his daughter by becoming close to them; although Rosario manages to befriend two of them easily, Martha (Martha Roth) is reluctant towards her. Rosario becomes especially determined to gain Martha’s respect after seeing history repeat itself when she discovers that Martha is about to have an affair with a married man, Manuel Lezcano (Ramón Gay). Rosario intervenes and pretends to be Manuel’s mistress when Roberto comes looking for his daughter at Manuel’s office. Roberto leaves heartbroken. Later Martha breaks up the relationship with Manuel and thanks Rosario for taking the blame. The three girls go boating out at sea and their boat capsizes resulting in Martha’s death. Roberto confesses that Martha had explained everything having to do with Manuel and Rosario. Roberto further confesses to Rosario that Martha was not actually her daughter.

== Cast ==
- Libertad Lamarque as Rosario Velázquez
- Julián Soler as Roberto Casahonda
- Alicia Caro as Claudia
- Ramón Gay as Manuel Lezcano
- Anabelle Gutiérrez as Julieta (as Anabelle)
- Pedro Vargas as Singer
- Jesús Valero as Telegraphist
- Martha Roth as Marta

== Production ==
The film's executive producer, Alfonso Patiño Gómez, stated that he viewed the combination of director Julio Bracho and leading actress Libertad Lamarque as "strange", describing them as "very heterogeneous elements", since "he is not the characteristic type to direct melodramas and she is the best interpreter of this type".

== Reception ==
Jesús Ibarra in Los Bracho: tres generaciones de cine mexicano said regarding contemporary reception of the film that "the criticism was very benevolent", and that it "meant a new box office success" for director Julio Bracho. However, a retrospective review by Carlos Fuentes in Pantallas de plata described it as an "unclassifiable melodrama," "with Libertad Lamarque in her umpteenth interpretation of the mater dolorosa."
