= Victorio Blanco =

Mexican actor

- Born: September 18, 1893; Alvarado, Veracruz, Mexico
- Died: October 1, 1977 (aged 84); Mexico City, Mexico
- Occupation: Actor
- Years active: 1933–1977

Victorio Blanco (1893–1977) was a Mexican film actor. He enjoyed a lengthy and prolific career, appearing in around three hundred films.

== Selected filmography ==
- Judas (1936)
- The Midnight Ghost (1940)
- Simón Bolívar (1942)
- The Magician (1949)
- Another Spring (1950)
- The Doorman (1950)
- Cabaret Shangai (1950)
- The Two Orphans (1950)
- Aventurera (1950)
- Traces of the Past (1950)
- Los Olvidados (1950)
- Love for Sale (1951)
- Serenade in Acapulco (1951)
- They Say I'm a Communist (1951)
- María Montecristo (1951)
- Women Without Tomorrow (1951)
- The Masked Tiger (1951)
- Los enredos de una gallega (1951)
- Kill Me Because I'm Dying! (1951)
- My Darling Clementine (1953)
- The Player (1953)
- A Tailored Gentleman (1954)
- Tehuantepec (1954)
- The Sin of Being a Woman (1955)
- The Bandits of Cold River (1956)

== Bibliography ==
- Emilio García Riera. Historia documental del cine mexicano: 1929-1937. Universidad de Guadalajara, 1992.
