= A media luz los tres =

- Directed by: Julián Soler
- Written by: Luis Alcoriza; Miguel Mihura (play)
- Produced by: Gregorio Walerstein
- Starring: Arturo de Córdova, Lilia Prado, María Elena Marqués
- Cinematography: Agustín Martínez Solares
- Edited by: Rafael Ceballos
- Music by: Gustavo César Carrión
- Release date: March 26, 1958 (México)
- Running time: 93 minutes
- Country: Mexico
- Language: Spanish

A media luz los tres is a 1958 Mexican film directed by Julián Soler. It was written by Luis Alcoriza, adapted from the 1953 play of the same name (A media luz los tres (play)) by Miguel Mihura.

Commenting on the film, a contemporary reviewer stated: "Julián Soler has opted for Spanish works, even if they are not very good, to avoid the problems that seem inevitable with translations and translators."

== Cast ==
- Arturo de Córdova
- Lilia Prado
- María Elena Marqués
- Martha Roth
- Sofía Álvarez
- Wolf Ruvinskis
- Guillermo Orea
- Pedro de Aguillón
- Luis Aragón
- Carlota Solares
- José Peña
- Rosa María Moreno
- Carlos Martínez Baena
- Luis Otero
- Silvia Carrillo
