= Young People (1961 film) =

1961 film

- Directed by: Luis Alcoriza
- Written by: Luis Alcoriza
- Produced by: Gregorio Walerstein
- Starring: Teresa Velázquez, Julio Alemán, Adriana Roel, Rafael del Río, Dacia González, Fanny Schiller
- Cinematography: Agustín Martínez Solares
- Edited by: Rafael Ceballos
- Release date: 28 September 1961
- Running time: 100 minutes
- Country: Mexico
- Language: Spanish

Young People (Spanish: Los jóvenes) is a 1961 Mexican crime film written and directed by Luis Alcoriza and starring Teresa Velázquez, Julio Alemán, Adriana Roel, Rafael del Río, Dacia González and Fanny Schiller. It was entered into the 11th Berlin International Film Festival.

== Cast ==
- Teresa Velázquez - Olga (as Tere Velazquez)
- Julio Alemán - El Gato
- Adriana Roel - Alicia
- Rafael del Río - Gabriel
- Dacia González - Amiga de Alicia
- Fanny Schiller - Carmelita, Madre de 'El Gato'
- Miguel Manzano - Don Fernando
- Leopoldo Salazar
- Óscar Cuéllar
- Rosa María Gallardo - Amiga rubia de Alicia (as Rosa Ma. Gallardo)
- Arcelia Larrañaga
- Miguel Suárez - Amigo de Raúl
- Sonia Infante - Amiga de Alicia
- Lupe Carriles
- David Hayat
- Miguel Zaldivar - (as Miguel Zaldivar R.)
- Nicolás Rodríguez
- Guillermo Herrera - Bobby
- Enrique Rambal - Don Raúl, padre de Gabriel
- Carmen Montejo - Rosa, Madre de Alicia
