= Francisco Marco Chillet =

- Occupation: Art director
- Years active: 1945-1970 (film)

Francisco Marco Chillet was a Mexican art director. He designed the sets for over a hundred films and worked on a number of productions during the Golden Age of Mexican cinema.

== Selected filmography ==
- The Shack (1945)
- Juan Charrasqueado (1948)
- Spurs of Gold (1948)
- Hypocrite (1949)
- In the Flesh (1951)
- Women of the Theatre (1951)
- Port of Temptation (1951)
- En La Palma de Tu Mano (1951)
- We Maids (1951)
- In the Palm of Your Hand (1951)
- My Adorable Savage (1952)
- Private Secretary (1952)
- The Seven Girls (1955)
- The Bandits of Cold River (1956)

== Bibliography ==
- Román Gubern. El Cine Español en el Exilio. Lumen, 1976.
