= Bel Ami (1947 film) =

1947 film

- Directed by: Antonio Momplet
- Written by: Leopoldo Baeza y Aceves; Tito Davison; Francisco Navarro; Xavier Villaurrutia
- Based on: Bel Ami by Guy de Maupassant
- Produced by: Gregorio Walerstein
- Starring: Armando Calvo; Gloria Marín; Andrea Palma
- Cinematography: Alex Phillips
- Edited by: Jorge Bustos; Mario González
- Music by: Rosalío Ramírez; Federico Ruiz
- Production company: Filmex
- Distributed by: Clasa-Mohme
- Release date: 27 February 1947
- Running time: 102 minutes
- Country: Mexico
- Language: Spanish

Bel Ami is a 1947 Mexican historical drama film directed by Antonio Momplet and starring Armando Calvo, Gloria Marín and Andrea Palma. The film's sets were designed by the art director Edward Fitzgerald. It is an adaptation of the 1885 novel Bel Ami by Guy de Maupassant. It is also known by the alternative title El buen mozo.

== Cast ==
- Armando Calvo as Jorge Duroy
- Gloria Marín as Magdalena Forestier
- Andrea Palma as Virginia Walter
- Emilia Guiú as Clotilde de Marelle
- Patricia Morán as Susana
- José Baviera as Sr. Walter
- Jorge Mondragón as Sr. Forestier
- Nicolás Rodríguez as Varenne
- Rafael Banquells as Jacobo Rival - Periodista
- Juan Calvo as Coronel Duclos
- Carlos Aguirre as Márques de Cassolles

== Bibliography ==
- Amador, María Luisa & Blanco, Jorge Ayala . Cartelera cinematográfica, 1940–1949. Centro Universitario de Estudios Cinematográficos, Universidad Nacional Autónoma de México, 1982.
- De España, Rafael. Directory of Spanish and Portuguese film-makers and films. Greenwood Press, 1994.
- Riera, Emilio García . Historia documental del cine mexicano: 1946–1948. Universidad de Guadalajara, 1992.
