= Neftali Beltrán =

Mexican screenwriter (1916–1996)

- Born: 16 May 1916; Alvarado, Veracruz, Mexico
- Died: 17 September 1996 (aged 80); Veracruz, Veracruz, Mexico
- Occupation: Screenwriter
- Years active: 1941–1959 (film)

Neftali Beltrán (1916–1996) was a Mexican poet and screenwriter. He was active during the Golden Age of Mexican Cinema.

== Selected filmography ==
- Oh, What Times, Don Simon! (1941)
- Summer Hotel (1944)
- The Daughter of the Regiment (1944)
- Mischievous Susana (1945)
- Love Makes Them Crazy (1946)
- Don't Marry My Wife (1947)
- Ritmos del Caribe (1950)
- The Absentee (1951)
- She and I (1951)
- The Cry of the Flesh (1951)
- Forgotten Faces (1952)
- Rossana (1953)
- The Magnificent Beast (1953)

== Bibliography ==
- Foster, David William (ed.) Mexican Literature: A History. University of Texas Press, 2010.
- Salazkina, Masha. In Excess: Sergei Eisenstein's Mexico. University of Chicago Press, 2009.
