= The Lottery Ticket Seller =

1953 film by Raphael J. Sevilla

- Directed by: Raphael J. Sevilla
- Written by: Nina Wilcox Putnam; Raphael J. Sevilla
- Produced by: Armando Cuspinera; Luis Lezama; Henry A. Lube; Juan G. Valdés
- Starring: David Silva; Esther Fernández; Rodolfo Acosta
- Cinematography: Enrique Wallace
- Edited by: Juan José Marino
- Music by: Gonzalo Curiel
- Production company: Cinematografica Cuauhtemoc
- Release date: 28 January 1953
- Country: Mexico
- Language: Spanish

The Lottery Ticket Seller (Spanish: El billetero) is a 1953 Mexican drama film directed by Raphael J. Sevilla and starring David Silva, Esther Fernández and Rodolfo Acosta.

== Cast ==
- David Silva as Pedro
- Esther Fernández as Lupita
- Rodolfo Acosta as Marcos Aguirre Torres
- Raphael Sevilla hijo as Chiquilín
- Arturo Martínez as Agente Silvano Bravo
- Antonio Díaz as Crescencio
- Gloria Iturbe as Rosita, la viuda Sánchez
- Lupe Carriles as Doña Chona
- Carmen Manzano as La güerita
- Lilian Plancarte as Luchi
- Felipe de Flores as Chente
- Miguel Ángel Valdés
- Hernán Vera as Cantinero
- Jorge Casanova as Don Agustín
- Víctor Velázquez as Jefe de policía
- Enrique Cancino
- Maria Aurelia de Torres as Billetera anciana
- Moises Esteves
- Alfonso Esteves
- Carlos Aclemar
- Antonio Dávila
- Alejandro Plancarte
- Hilda Grey
- Roberto Y. Palacios as Jugador Chino
- José Escanero as Comisario
- Leonor Gómez as Puestera
- Isabel Herrera as Puestera
- Ignacio Peón as Melquiades
- María Luisa Smith as Doña Quirinita, billetera anciana
- Enrique Zambrano as Doctor

== Bibliography ==
- Rogelio Agrasánchez. Cine Mexicano: Posters from the Golden Age, 1936-1956. Chronicle Books, 2001.
