= The Midnight Ghost =

- Directed by: Raphael J. Sevilla
- Produced by: Raphael J. Sevilla
- Starring: Victoria Blanco; Sergio de Karlo; Carlos López Moctezuma
- Production company: Rex Films
- Release date: 6 June 1940
- Running time: 72 minutes
- Country: Mexico
- Language: Spanish

The Midnight Ghost (Spanish:El fantasma de medianoche) is a 1940 Mexican mystery film directed by Raphael J. Sevilla and starring Victorio Blanco, Sergio de Karlo and Carlos López Moctezuma.

== Cast ==
- Victorio Blanco
- Sergio de Karlo
- Carlos López Moctezuma
- Emma Roldán
- Natalia Ortiz
- Miguel Weimer
- Crox Alvarado
- Ricardo Mondragon
- Amalia Ferriz
- Victorio Blanco
- Manuel Sánchez Navarro
- Parkey Hussain
- Humberto Rodríguez

== Bibliography ==
- José de Paco Navarro. José Crespo: memorias de un actor. Editora Regional de Murcia, 1994.
