= Nosotras las taquígrafas =

- Directed by: Emilio Gómez Muriel
- Screenplay by: Alfonso Patiño Gómez (adaptation)
- Based on: Nosotras las taquígrafas by Sarah Batiza
- Starring: Alma Rosa Aguirre, Lilia del Valle, Blanca de Castejón
- Release date: 1950
- Country: Mexico

Nosotras las taquígrafas ("We the Stenographers") is a 1950 Mexican film directed by Emilio Gómez Muriel and starring Alma Rosa Aguirre, Lilia del Valle, and Blanca de Castejón. It is based on a 1949 novel by Sarah Batiza, adapted for the screen by Alfonso Patiño Gómez.

The film's sets were designed by art director Jesús Bracho.
