= Entre Monjas Anda el Diablo =

- Directed by: René Cardona
- Starring: Vicente Fernández, Angélica María, Sara García, Alma Rosa Aguirre
- Release date: 1973
- Country: Mexico

Entre Monjas Anda el Diablo is a 1973 Mexican musical comedy film directed by René Cardona, and starring Vicente Fernández, Angélica María, Sara García and Alma Rosa Aguirre. This film features the last appearance of Aguirre in her film role.
