= Massacre (1956 film) =

1956 film by Louis King

- Directed by: Louis King
- Screenplay by: D.D. Beauchamp
- Based on: Fred Freiberger; William Tunberg (from a story by)
- Produced by: Robert L. Lippert Jr. Olallo Rubio Gandara (co-producer)
- Starring: Dane Clark; James Craig; Martha Roth
- Cinematography: Gilbert Warrenton
- Edited by: Carl Pierson
- Music by: Gonzalo Curiel
- Color process: Anscocolor
- Production company: Lippert Pictures
- Distributed by: 20th Century Fox
- Release dates: March 29, 1956 (Mexico City); June 1, 1956 (New York City)
- Running time: 75 minutes
- Countries: United States; Mexico
- Language: English

Massacre is a 1956 American-Mexican Western film directed by Louis King and starring Dane Clark, James Craig, and Martha Roth.

It was known as Charge of the Rurales.

== Plot ==
A tribe of hostile Indian goes on the warpath slaughtering white men with guns sold to them by mercenary outlaws.

== Cast ==
- Dane Clark as Capitán Ramón
- James Craig as Teniente Ezparza
- Martha Roth as Angélica Chávez
- Miguel Torruco as Miguel Chávez
- Jaime Fernández as Juan Pedro (as Jamie Fernandez)
- Ferrusquilla as Vincent
- Enrique Zambrano as Munez
- José Muñoz as Macario
- José Pulido as Self

== Production ==
The film was originally to have been a co-production between Robert Lippert and Guatemala with the film to be shot on location under the title Charge of the Rurales. Serious troubles forced the production to Mexico.
