= Women of the Theatre =

1951 film

- Directed by: René Cardona
- Written by: José Carbo
- Produced by: Guillermo Calderón; Pedro A. Calderón; Alberto López
- Starring: Emilia Guiú; Rosita Fornés; María Victoria
- Cinematography: Agustín Jiménez
- Edited by: Alfredo Rosas Priego
- Music by: Antonio Díaz Conde
- Production company: Cinematográfica Calderón
- Release date: 10 November 1951
- Running time: 86 minutes
- Country: Mexico
- Language: Spanish

Women of the Theatre (Spanish: Mujeres de teatro) is a 1951 Mexican musical film directed by René Cardona and starring Emilia Guiú, Rosita Fornés and María Victoria. The film's sets were designed by the art director Francisco Marco Chillet.

== Cast ==
- Emilia Guiú as Emilia
- Rosita Fornés as Rosita
- María Victoria as María Victoria
- Armando Silvestre as Esteban
- Carlos Valadez as Leandro Rosas
- Jorge Mondragón as Curro
- Roberto Cobo as Jarocho
- Celia Viveros
- Pedro González Rojas
- Luis Arcaraz
- Carmen Guillén as Empleada teatro
- Su Muy Key as Bailarina
- Kiko Mendive
- Humberto Rodríguez as Empleado teatro
- Acela Vidaurri as Empleada teatro

== Bibliography ==
- Rogelio Agrasánchez. Beauties of Mexican Cinema. Agrasanchez Film Archive, 2001.
