= Quiéreme porque me muero =

1953 film by Chano Urueta

- Directed by: Chano Urueta
- Written by: Arduino Maiuri
- Produced by: Julio Valdovinos
- Starring: Abel Salazar, Martha Roth, Andrés Soler
- Cinematography: Víctor Herrera
- Edited by: Jorge Bustos
- Music by: Jorge Perez
- Release date: July 16, 1953
- Running time: 97 minutes
- Country: Mexico
- Language: Spanish

Quiéreme porque me muero ("Love Me Because I Die") is a 1953 Mexican film directed by Chano Urueta and produced by Julio Valdovinos.

== Cast ==
- Abel Salazar
- Martha Roth
- Andrés Soler
- Arturo Martínez
- Roberto Meyer
- Nacho Contla
- Amparo Arozamena
- Josefina Leiner
- Francisco Pando
- Camilo Pérez 'Bulldog'

(as Camilo Perez 'Bull Dog')
