= A Galician in Mexico =

1949 film by Julián Soler

- Directed by: Julián Soler
- Written by: Joaquín Pardavé
- Produced by: Gregorio Walerstein
- Starring: Niní Marshall; Joaquín Pardavé; Alma Rosa Aguirre
- Cinematography: Agustín Martínez Solares
- Edited by: Rafael Ceballos
- Music by: Manuel Esperón
- Production company: Cinematográfica Filmex
- Release date: 31 December 1949
- Running time: 103 minutes
- Country: Mexico
- Language: Spanish

A Galician in Mexico (Spanish: Una Gallega en México) is a 1949 Mexican comedy film directed by Julián Soler and starring Niní Marshall, Joaquín Pardavé, and Alma Rosa Aguirre. It was shot at the Azteca Studios in Mexico City. The film's sets were designed by the art director Jorge Fernández.

== Cast ==
- Niní Marshall as Doña Cándida
- Joaquín Pardavé as Don Robustiano
- Alma Rosa Aguirre as Aurora
- Pepe del Río as Rodolfo
- Armando Soto La Marina as Morongo
- Lilia Prado as Ernestina
- Los Panchos as Cantantes
- Trío Calaveras as Cantantes
- Willy Chevalier as Cantante
- Jorge Negrete as Jorge Negrete
- Lupe Carriles as Vecina
- Fernando Casanova as Ricardo
- Roberto G. Rivera as Cantante
- Irma Dorantes as Chica en mercado

== Bibliography ==
- Riera, Emilio García. Historia documental del cine mexicano: 1949-1950. Universidad de Guadalajara, 1992
- Wilt, David E. The Mexican Filmography, 1916 through 2001. McFarland, 2024.
