= Víctor Alcocer =

Mexican actor (1917–1984)

Víctor Alcocer Gómez (March 23, 1917 – October 2, 1984) was a Mexican actor of film, television and voice-over. He dubbed many American TV characters into Spanish; "Herman Munster" from The Munsters is one of the most recognizable.

== Selected filmography ==
- Gangster's Kingdom (1948)
- Red Rain (1950)
- Cabaret Shanghai (1950)
- Treacherous (1950)
- In the Palm of Your Hand (1951)
- María Montecristo (1951)
- The Chicken Hawk (1951)
- Women Without Tomorrow (1951)
- Love Was Her Sin (1951)
- The Guests of the Marquesa (1951)
- A Galician Dances the Mambo (1951)
- Angélica (1952)
- Tropical Delirium (1952)
- Hotel Room (1953)
- The Sword of Granada (1953)
- I Want to Live (1953)
- Black Ace (1954)
- Drop the Curtain (1955)
- Spring in the Heart (1956)
- Corazón salvaje (1956)
- So Loved Our Fathers (1964)
- La Valentina (1966) ... Coronel
- Corazón salvaje (1968)
- Capulina Speedy Gonzalez (1970) ... El padre
- National Mechanics (1972)
- Length of War (1976)
