= I Don't Deny My Past =

1952 film

- Directed by: Alberto Gout
- Written by: Álvaro Custodio
- Produced by: Guillermo Calderón; Pedro A. Calderón
- Starring: Ninón Sevilla; Roberto Cañedo; Luis Aldás
- Cinematography: Rosalío Solano
- Edited by: Alfredo Rosas Priego
- Music by: Antonio Díaz Conde
- Production company: Producciones Calderón
- Release date: 4 March 1952
- Running time: 92 minutes
- Country: Mexico
- Language: Spanish

I Don't Deny My Past (Spanish: No niego mi pasado) is a 1952 Mexican drama film directed by Alberto Gout and starring Ninón Sevilla, Roberto Cañedo and Luis Aldás. It was shot at the Churubusco Studios in Mexico City. The film's sets were designed by the art directors Manuel Fontanals. It was part of the group of Rumberas films popular during the Golden Age of Mexican Cinema.

== Cast ==
- Ninón Sevilla as Rosa / Luisa
- Roberto Cañedo as Octavio Gómez Castro
- Luis Aldás as Leonardo
- Agustín Isunza as Don Nicasio
- César del Campo as Posturita
- José Baviera as Ramón Valdés
- Jorge Mondragón as Complice de Rosa
- Aurora Walker as Doña Engracia
- Jorge Treviño as Donato
- Manuel Sánchez Navarro as Don Julio
- Elodia Hernández as Mamá de Octavio
- Kiko Mendive as Cantante
- Juan Bruno Tarraza as Pianista
- Fello Vergara as Pianista
- Pascual García Peña as Pascual
- Nicolás Rodríguez as Mesero

== Bibliography ==
- Coerver, Don M. Pasztor, Suzanne B. and Buffington, Robert. Mexico: An Encyclopedia of Contemporary Culture and History. Bloomsbury Publishing, 2004.
- Gilabert, Rosa Peralt. Manuel Fontanals, escenógrafo: teatro, cine y exilio. Editorial Fundamentos, 2007.
- Paranaguá, Paulo Antonio . Mexican Cinema. British Film Institute, 1995.
