= La criada bien criada =

- Directed by: Fernando Cortés
- Written by: Fernando Cortés
- Based on: La criada bien criada
- Produced by: Fernando Cortés; Fernando de Fuentes, Jr.
- Starring: María Victoria
- Cinematography: Xavier Cruz
- Edited by: Sergio Soto
- Music by: Rafael de la Paz
- Production companies: Diana Films; Teleprogramas Acapulco
- Release date: February 3, 1972 (Mexico)
- Running time: 95 minutes
- Country: Mexico
- Language: Spanish

La criada bien criada ("The Well-Made Maid") is a 1972 Mexican comedy film based on the television series of the same name. It was directed by Fernando Cortés and stars María Victoria and Guillermo Rivas.

== Plot ==
Inocencia has left her pueblo to find a job at Mexico City. In Mexico City, Inocencia meets two men, a deliveryman and a postman, who fight for her love. The postman finds a babysitting job for Inocencia. Inocencia has to take care of Bebito, who is more "grown up" than she expected.

== Cast ==
- María Victoria as Inocencia
- Chabelo as Bebito
- Guillermo Rivas as the delivery man
- Alejandro Suárez as the postman
- Jorge Lavat
- Arturo Castro
- Alfonso Zayas
- Joaquin Garcia Vargas "Borolas"
