= ¡... Y murió por nosotros! =

1951 film by Joselito Rodríguez

- Directed by: Joselito Rodríguez
- Produced by: Alfonso Sánchez Tello
- Starring: Eduardo Arozamena; Jorge Arriaga; Felipe de Alba
- Release date: 15 March 1951
- Running time: 95 minutes
- Country: Mexico
- Language: Spanish

¡... Y murió por nosotros! ("...He Died for Us!") is a 1951 Mexican film. It stars Carlos Orellana.

The film contributed to a 1950s wave of religious cinema in Mexico.

== Plot ==
A local teacher tries to stop the abusive and poor working conditions in a mining town.
