= Orange Blossom for Your Wedding =

1950 film

- Directed by: Julián Soler
- Written by: Julián Soler; Mauricio Magdaleno
- Based on: Such Is Life by Nicolás de las Llanderas and Arnaldo Malfatti
- Produced by: Gregorio Walerstein
- Starring: Fernando Soler; Sara García; Marga López
- Cinematography: Agustín Martínez Solares
- Edited by: Rafael Ceballos
- Music by: Rosalío Ramírez; Federico Ruiz
- Production company: Filmex
- Distributed by: Clasa-Mohme
- Release date: 19 July 1950
- Running time: 115 minutes
- Country: Mexico
- Language: Spanish

Orange Blossom for Your Wedding (Spanish: Azahares para tu boda) is a 1950 Mexican historical comedy drama film directed by Julián Soler and starring Fernando Soler, Sara García and Marga López. It was shot at the Azteca Studios in Mexico City. The film's sets were designed by the art director Jorge Fernández. It is a remake of the 1939 Argentine film Such Is Life.

== Synopsis ==
It portrays a conservative middle-class family in the years before the Mexican Revolution onwards. The father forbids the marriage of his daughter Felicia to one of her suitors.

== Cast ==
- Fernando Soler as Ernesto
- Sara García as Eloísa
- Joaquín Pardavé as Don Bodroz
- Marga López as Felicia
- Domingo Soler as Alberto
- Andrés Soler as Sr. Cabrera
- Fernando Soto "Mantequilla" as Rosendo
- Rodolfo Landa as Luis
- Hortensia Constance as Adela
- Margarita Cortés as Felipa
- Florencio Castelló as Amigo español del tendero
- Anabelle Gutiérrez as Margarita
- Antonio R. Frausto as Porfirio Díaz
- Freddy Fernández as Eduardo - young
- Joaquín Cordero as Eduardo - adult
- Eduardo Noriega as Carlos
- Silvia Pinal as Tota
- Queta Lavat as Nieta
- Nicolás Rodríguez as Tendero Español
- Lupe Carriles as Sirvienta fea
- Alfonso Zayas

== Bibliography ==
- Amador, María Luisa. Cartelera cinematográfica, 1950-1959. UNAM, 1985.
- Stock, Anne Marie (ed.) Framing Latin American Cinema: Contemporary Critical Perspectives. University of Minnesota Press, 1997.
