= The Naked Woman (film) =

1953 film by Fernando Méndez

- Directed by: Fernando Méndez
- Written by: Luis Manrique; Pedro de Urdimalas; Gregorio Walerstein
- Produced by: Luis Manrique; Gregorio Walerstein
- Starring: Meche Barba; Antonio Aguilar; Elda Peralda; María Victoria
- Cinematography: Agustín Martínez Solares
- Edited by: Rafael Ceballos
- Music by: Sergio Guerrero
- Production company: Cinematográfica Filmex
- Distributed by: Clasa-Mohme
- Release date: 25 March 1953
- Running time: 90 minutes
- Country: Mexico
- Language: Spanish

The Naked Woman (Spanish: La mujer desnuda) is a 1953 Mexican drama film directed by Fernando Méndez and starring Meche Barba, Antonio Aguilar and Aurora Segura. It is part of the genre of Rumberas film popular during the Golden Age of Mexican Cinema. It was shot at the San Ángel Studios in Mexico City. The film's sets were designed by the art director Jorge Fernández.

== Plot ==
A cabaret dancer, daughter of a circus clown, marries a famous singer. When both seem to be happy, a former lover of the young woman returns from her past and blackmails her to not reveal her dark past.

== Cast ==
- Meche Barba as Magda
- Antonio Aguilar as Tony Aguilar
- Miguel Torruco as David
- Carlos López Moctezuma as Don Pedro
- Aurora Segura as Carmen
- Fanny Schiller as Violeta Bello
- María Victoria as María Victoria
- Marión Inclán as Cantante
- Titina Romay as Magda, niña
- Lupe Carriles as Doña Chole
- Pascual García Peña as Portero

== Reviews ==
In this film, Meche Barba does not appear naked as the title suggests, but she was painted gold, and then dressed in expensive fur coats in a gruesome story with a melodramatic ending. The film was vetoed by the now defunct League of Decency. The great photography of Agustín Martínez Solares stands out and gives a touch of Film noir with the singer Antonio Aguilar as a sort of Mexican Victor Mature who gives a tremendous beating to the villain Miguel Torruco.

== Bibliography ==
- Alfaro, Eduardo de la Vega. Fernando Méndez, 1908-1966. Universidad de Guadalajara, 1995.
- Vitali, Valentina. Capital and Popular Cinema: The Dollars are Coming!. Manchester University Press, 2016.
