= When the Night Ends =

1950 film

- Directed by: Emilio Gómez Muriel
- Written by: Jesús Cárdenas; Isaac Díaz Araiza; Pedro de Urdimalas
- Produced by: Alfredo Ripstein Jr.
- Starring: David Silva; Lilia Prado; Óscar Pulido
- Cinematography: Ezequiel Carrasco
- Edited by: Carlos Savage
- Music by: Manuel Esperón
- Production company: Alameda Films
- Distributed by: Películas Nacionales
- Release date: 14 June 1950
- Running time: 88 minutes
- Country: Mexico
- Language: Spanish

When the Night Ends (Spanish: Cuando acaba la noche) is a 1950 Mexican crime thriller film directed by Emilio Gómez Muriel and starring David Silva, Lilia Prado and Óscar Pulido. It was shot at the Azteca Studios in Mexico City. The film's sets were designed by the art director Jorge Fernández.

== Cast ==
- David Silva as Gabriel Moreno
- Lilia Prado as Consuelo González
- Óscar Pulido as Fotógrafo
- Carlos Múzquiz as Enrique
- Enriqueta Reza as Madre de Gabriel
- Aurora Segura as Señorita Meneses
- Pedro de Urdimalas as Preso
- Jorge Arriaga as Bernabé
- Mercedes Soler as Ana María
- Juan Orraca as Gangster
- Lucha Palacios as Amelia
- Gaspar Henaine as Vecino
- Rafael Baledón as Federico García Briseño
- Armando Velasco as Director del penal
- Caridad Vázquez as Bailarina
- Mercedes Vázquez as Bailarina

== Bibliography ==
- Navitski, Rielle & Poppe, Nicolas (ed.) Cosmopolitan Film Cultures in Latin America, 1896–1960. Indiana University Press, 2017.
- Riera, Emilio García. Historia documental del cine mexicano: 1949-1950. Universidad de Guadalajara, 1992
