= Pascual García Peña =

Mexican actor

- Born: 17 September 1910; San Luis Potosi, Mexico
- Died: 1977 (aged 66–67)
- Occupation: Actor
- Years active: 1946-1976 (film)

Pascual García Peña (1910–1977) was a Mexican film actor.

He was married to actress Hortensia Santoveña.

== Selected filmography ==
- Felipe Was Unfortunate (1947)
- Madam Temptation (1948)
- The Big Steal (1949)
- Midnight (1949)
- Angels of the Arrabal (1949)
- The Woman of the Port (1949)
- Hypocrite (1949)
- In the Palm of Your Hand (1951)
- Love Was Her Sin (1951)
- Oh Darling! Look What You've Done! (1951)
- The Masked Tiger (1951)
- Love for Sale (1951)
- Arrabalera (1951)
- My Man and I (1952)
- The Atomic Fireman (1952)
- Hot Rhumba (1952)
- Paco the Elegant (1952)
- The Justice of the Wolf (1952)
- I Don't Deny My Past (1952)
- The Beautiful Dreamer (1952)
- Passionflower (1952)
- City of Bad Men (1953)
- Genius and Figure (1953)
- The Naked Woman (1953)
- A Life in the Balance (1955)
- The Beast of Hollow Mountain (1956)
- The Black Scorpion (1957)
- The Boxer (1958)
- Black Skull (1960)

== Bibliography ==
- Rogelio Agrasánchez. Guillermo Calles: A Biography of the Actor and Mexican Cinema Pioneer. McFarland, 2010.
