= The Sin of Being a Woman =

1955 film by Zacarías Gómez Urquiza

- Directed by: Zacarías Gómez Urquiza
- Written by: Rafael García Travesi; Zacarías Gómez Urquiza
- Story by: Tito Guízar
- Produced by: Guillermo Calderón; Pedro A. Calderón; Tito Guízar
- Starring: Tito Guízar; Alma Rosa Aguirre
- Cinematography: Manuel Gómez Urquiza
- Edited by: José W. Bustos
- Music by: Antonio Díaz Conde
- Production company: Producciones Calderón S.A.
- Release date: 26 May 1955
- Country: Mexico
- Language: Spanish

The Sin of Being a Woman (Spanish: El pecado de ser mujer) is a 1955 Mexican drama film directed by Zacarías Gómez Urquiza and starring Tito Guízar and Alma Rosa Aguirre. The film's sets were designed by art director Javier Torres Torija.

== Plot ==
Javier Morales (Tito Guízar) is a singer-songwriter who seduces a young woman, María Luisa (Alma Rosa Aguirre), who he gets pregnant and then abandons. Twenty years later, Javier falls into poverty. After he's mistakenly declared dead, he ends up going to his own funeral, without knowing that he is going to face his own past.

== Cast ==
- Tito Guízar as Javier Morales
- Alma Rosa Aguirre as María Luisa Aguirre
- Ricardo Román as Javier Aguirre
- Armando Velasco as Señor Romero
- Emilio Brillas as Fernando
- Roberto G. Rivera as Radio show announcer
- Carlos Bravo y Fernández as Costume party guest
- Ángel Merino as Carlos Patiño
- Estela Matute as Felisa Dieguez, reporter
- Tito Guízar hijo as Javier Aguirre (child)
- Daniel Arroyo as Man in airport (uncredited)
- León Barroso as Theater employee (uncredited)
- Victorio Blanco as Costume party guest (uncredited)
- Guillermo Bravo Sosa as Beggar run over (uncredited)
- Javier de la Parra as Reporter (uncredited)
- Enedina Díaz de León as Landlady (uncredited)
- Leonor Gómez as Puestera (uncredited)
- Ana María Hernández as Theater viewer (uncredited)
- Salvador Lozano as Dr. Enrique Ruiz (uncredited)
- Chel López as Taxi driver (uncredited)
- Rubén Márquez as Costume party guest (uncredited)
- Óscar Ortiz de Pinedo as Reporter (uncredited)
- Alberto Pedret as Costume party announcer (uncredited)
- Carlos Robles Gil as Theater viewer (uncredited)
- Joaquín Roche as Theater viewer (uncredited)
- Manuel Sánchez Navarro as Man at funeral (uncredited)
- Christa von Humboldt as Javier's mistress (uncredited)

== Bibliography ==
- Amador, María Luisa. Cartelera cinematográfica, 1950–1959. UNAM, 1985.
- García Riera, Emilio. Historia documental del cine mexicano: 1952. Ediciones Era, 1969.
- Alcerreca, Rafael. Un regard sur les studios churubusco. Estudios Churubusco Azteca, 2002.
