= Agustín Martínez Solares =

Mexican cinematographer (1902–1965)

- Born: 7 August 1902; Mexico City, Mexico
- Died: 8 February 1965 (aged 62); Mexico City, Mexico
- Occupation: Cinematographer
- Years active: 1938–1965 (film)

Agustín Martínez Solares (1902–1965) was a Mexican cinematographer. He worked prolifically during the Golden Age of Mexican Cinema. He was the brother of the film director Gilberto Martínez Solares and the cinematographer Raúl Martínez Solares. He was married to the actress Blanca Rosa Otero. He was twice nominated for the Ariel Award for Best Cinematography.

== Selected filmography ==
- Beautiful Mexico (1938)
- The League of Songs (1941)
- ¡Así se quiere en Jalisco! (1942)
- The Count of Monte Cristo (1942)
- Alejandra (1942)
- Santa (1943)
- Land of Passions (1943)
- The Lady of the Camellias (1944)
- La selva de fuego (1945)
- Marina (1945)
- Caribbean Rose (1946)
- The Stronger Sex (1946)
- Strange Appointment (1947)
- Five Faces of Woman (1947)
- The Newlywed Wants a House (1948)
- The Perez Family (1949)
- Tender Pumpkins (1949)
- A Galician in Mexico (1949)
- Rough But Respectable (1949)
- Orange Blossom for Your Wedding (1950)
- Red Rain (1950)
- María Montecristo (1951)
- A Galician Dances the Mambo (1951)
- Love for Sale (1951)
- Women Without Tomorrow (1951)
- Love Was Her Sin (1951)
- A Place Near Heaven (1952)
- My Wife and the Other One (1952)
- Now I Am Rich (1952)
- The Lie (1952)
- The Naked Woman (1953)
- The Three Perfect Wives (1953)
- You've Got Me By the Wing (1953)
- The Island of Women (1953)
- Remember to Live (1953)
- My Darling Clementine (1953)
- Dona Mariquita of My Heart (1953)
- If You Came Back to Me (1954)
- The Rapture (1954)
- A media luz los tres (1958)
- Where Are Our Children Going? (1958)
- Young People (1961)
- Alma llanera (1965)

== Bibliography ==
- Riera, Emilio García. Historia documental del cine mexicano: 1946-1948. Universidad de Guadalajara, 1992.
- Wilt, David E. The Mexican Filmography, 1916 through 2001. McFarland, 2024.
