= My Adorable Savage =

1952 film

- Directed by: Jaime Salvador
- Written by: Jaime Salvador
- Produced by: Felipe Cabero
- Starring: Armando Calvo; Rita Macedo; Prudencia Grifell
- Cinematography: Enrique Wallace
- Edited by: Carlos Savage
- Music by: Nacho García
- Release date: 21 March 1952
- Running time: 91 minutes
- Country: Mexico
- Language: Spanish

My Adorable Savage (Spanish: Mi adorado salvaje) is a 1952 Mexican comedy film directed by Jaime Salvador and starring Armando Calvo, Rita Macedo and Prudencia Grifell. The film's sets were designed by the art director Francisco Marco Chillet.

== Synopsis ==
When her relations back in Spain organise a marriage for their niece, she pretends to already be married and ropes in man to act as her husband while her folks are visiting Mexico.

== Cast ==
- Armando Calvo
- Rita Macedo
- Nono Arsu
- Juan Calvo
- Prudencia Grifell
- Rosa Carballo
- Conchita Gentil Arcos
- Lupe Llaca
- Pepita Morillo
- Virginia Nemer
- Luis Pérez Meza
- Enrique Zambrano
- Dalia Íñiguez

== Bibliography ==
- Pierce, David. Motion Picture Copyrights & Renewals, 1950-1959. Milestone, 1989.
- Riera, Emilio García. Historia documental del cine mexicano: 1951-1952. Universidad de Guadalajara, 1992
