= Canta y no llores... (1949 film) =

- Directed by: Alfonso Patiño Gómez
- Screenplay by: Alfonso Patiño Gómez
- Story by: Mane Sierra; A. Guzmán Aguilera; Carlos Ortega
- Produced by: Salvador Elizondo
- Starring: Irma Vila; Carlos López Moctezuma
- Narrated by: Irma Vila
- Cinematography: Agustín Martínez Solares
- Edited by: Jorge Bustos
- Music by: José de Pérez; Federico Ruiz; Rosalío Ramírez
- Production company: Estudios Clasa
- Release date: 19 October 1949 (Mexico)
- Running time: 79 minutes
- Country: Mexico
- Language: Spanish

Canta y no llores... ('Sing and Don't Cry...') is a 1949 Mexican musical film directed by Alfonso Patiño Gómez and starring ranchera singer Irma Vila and Carlos López Moctezuma.

== Cast ==
- Irma Vila as Rosario "La Tapatía"
- Carlos López Moctezuma as Enrique
- Rodolfo Landa as Gabriel
- Nelly Montiel as Altagracia
- Felipe de Alba as Chuy Anaya
- María Gentil Arcos as Rosario's mother
- Manolo Noriega as Rosario's grandfather

== Songs ==
- "Feria de las Flores", written by Chucho Monge
- "México lindo", written by Chucho Monge
- "Me das una pena", written by Chucho Monge
- "Besando la Cruz", written by Chucho Monge
- "Guadalajara", written by Pepe Guízar
- "Paloma blanca", written by Miguel Lerdo de Tejada
- "Campanero", written by Federico Ruiz
- "Amor en Swing", written by Federico Ruiz
- "La Tequilera", written by Alfredo D'Orsay
- "Cielito lindo", written by Manuel Castro Padilla
