= The Island of Women =

1953 film by Rafael Baledón

- Directed by: Rafael Baledón
- Written by: Janet Alcoriza; Luis Alcoriza; Ramón Obón
- Produced by: Gregorio Walerstein
- Starring: Germán Valdés; Lilia del Valle; Aurora Segura; Carlota Solares
- Cinematography: Agustín Martínez Solares
- Edited by: Juan José Marino
- Music by: Carlos Tirado
- Production company: Cinematográfica Filmex
- Release date: 16 April 1953
- Running time: 90 minutes
- Country: Mexico
- Language: Spanish

The Island of Women (Spanish: La isla de las mujeres) is a 1953 Mexican comedy film written by Janet Alcoriza and Luis Alcoriza, directed by Rafael Baledón, and starring Germán Valdés "Tin-Tan", Lilia del Valle, Aurora Segura, Carlota Solares and The Julian Sisters.

== Cast ==
- Germán Valdés as Tin Tan
- Lilia del Valle as Orana
- Fernando Soto "Mantequilla" as Uru Uru
- Marcelo Chávez as Toronga
- Carlota Solares as Matriarca
- Pedro de Aguillón as Tacaroa
- Araceli Julián as Flora
- Elena Julián as Maroma
- Rosalía Julián as Caroa
- Joaquín García "Borolas" as Isleño
- Luz María Núñez as La que no tiene nombre
- Omar Jasso as Isleño
- Estela Matute as Subastadora
- Pepe Ruiz Vélez as Anunciador
- Aurora Segura as Mujer de Tacaroa
- Gregorio Acosta as Hombre de isla vecina
- Guillermo Bravo Sosa as Encargado de funeraria
- Alfonso Carti as Isleño
- Manuel Casanueva as Isleño
- José Chávez as Isleño
- Juan García as Isleño
- Jesús Gómez as Isleño
- Elvira Lodi as Isleña
- Velia Lupercio as Espectadora de avión
- José Ortega as Cliente de Tin Tan
- José Pardavé as Piloto
- Ángela Rodríguez as Guardia isleña
- Alta Mae Stone as Isleña

== Bibliography ==
- Baugh, Scott L. Latino American Cinema: An Encyclopedia of Movies, Stars, Concepts, and Trends: An Encyclopedia of Movies, Stars, Concepts, and Trends. ABC-CLIO, 2012.
