= In the Palm of Your Hand =

1951 film by Roberto Gavaldón

- Mexican theatrical release poster
- Directed by: Roberto Gavaldón
- Screenplay by: José Revueltas; Roberto Gavaldón
- Produced by: Felipe Mier; Óscar J. Brooks
- Starring: Arturo de Córdova; Leticia Palma; Carmen Montejo
- Cinematography: Alex Phillips
- Edited by: Charles L. Kimball
- Music by: Raúl Lavista
- Production companies: Mier and Brooks Productions
- Distributed by: Azteca Films
- Release date: June 21, 1951
- Running time: 113 minutes
- Country: Mexico
- Language: Spanish

In the Palm of Your Hand (Spanish: En la Palma de Tu Mano) is a 1951 Mexican crime drama film directed by Roberto Gavaldón. The film received eleven nominations and won eight Ariel Awards in 1952, including Best Picture and Best Director. It was shot at the Churubusco Studios in Mexico City. The film's sets were designed by the art director Francisco Marco Chillet.

== Cast ==
- Arturo de Córdova as Jaime Karín
- Leticia Palma as Ada Cisneros de Romano
- Carmen Montejo as Clara Stein
- Ramón Gay as León Romano
- Consuelo Guerrero de Luna as Señorita Arnold
- Enriqueta Reza as Carmelita
- Manuel Arvide as Inspector de policia
- Bertha Lehar as Señora del Valle
- Lonka Becker as Dueña de restaurante
- José Arratia as Notario
- Nicolás Rodríguez as Abogado
- Guillermo Ramírez as Policía en carretera
- Ignacio García as Organista
- Pascual García Peña as Pajarero
- Víctor Alcocer as Policía

== Awards ==
=== Ariel Awards ===
The Ariel Awards are awarded annually by the Mexican Academy of Film Arts and Sciences in Mexico. En la Palma de Tu Mano received eight awards out of eleven nominations.

| Year | Nominee / work | Award | Result |
|---|---|---|---|
| 1952 | Producciones Mier y Brooks | Best Picture | Won |
| 1952 | Roberto Gavaldón | Best Director | Won |
| 1952 | Arturo de Córdova | Best Actor | Won |
| 1952 | Tana Lynn | Best Actress in a Minor Role | Nominated |
| 1952 | Luis Spota | Best Original Story | Won |
| 1952 | José Revueltas, Roberto Gavaldón | Best Adapted Screenplay | Nominated |
| 1952 | Alex Phillips | Best Cinematography | Won |
| 1952 | Charles L. Kimball | Best Editing | Won |
| 1952 | Raúl Lavista | Best Score | Nominated |
| 1952 | Rodolfo Benítez | Best Sound | Won |
| 1952 | Francisco Marco Chillet | Best Set Design | Won |

== Bibliography ==
- Hernandez-Rodriguez, R. Splendors of Latin Cinema. ABC-CLIO, 2009.
- Wilt, David E. Stereotyped Images of United States Citizens in Mexican Cinema, 1930-1990. University of Maryland at College Park, 1991.
