= Nicolás Rodríguez (actor) =

Spanish-born Mexican actor

- Born: Nicolás Rodríguez Menéndez; 21 January 1898; Madrid, Spain
- Died: 26 February 1966 (aged 68); Mexico City, Mexico
- Occupation: Actor
- Years active: 1927–1967

Nicolás Rodríguez Menéndez (21 January 1898 – 26 February 1966) was a Spanish-born Mexican actor. He appeared in more than one hundred films from 1927 to 1967.

== Selected filmography ==
Year	Title	Role	Notes
1936	The Lady from Trévelez		
1945	Espoir: Sierra de Teruel		
1947	Five Faces of Woman		
1947	A Gypsy in Jalisco		
1947	Ecija's Seven Children		
1947	The Secret of Juan Palomo		
1947	Bel Ami		
1947	Strange Appointment		
1948	Que Dios me perdone		
1948	Little Black Angels		
1948	Beau Ideal		
1949	Tender Pumpkins		
1950	The Two Orphans		
1950	Orange Blossom for Your Wedding		
1950	Mi querido capitán		
1950	Immaculate		
1950	The Devil Is a Woman		
1951	Engagement Ring		
1951	In the Palm of Your Hand		
1951	Women Without Tomorrow		
1951	Love Was Her Sin		
1951	Kill Me Because I'm Dying!		
1951	Crime and Punishment		
1953	Las locuras de Tin-Tan		
1953	The Beautiful Dreamer		
1953	I Don't Deny My Past		
1953	The Loving Women		
1954	When I Leave		
1954	The White Rose		
1955	Bluebeard		
1956	The King of Mexico		
1956	The Bandits of Cold River		
1957	Pablo and Carolina		
1961	Young People		
