= Felipe de Alba =

Mexican actor (1924–2005)

- De Alba circa 1950
- Born: April 29, 1924; Mexico City, Mexico
- Died: November 15, 2005 (aged 81); New York City, New York, U.S.
- Occupation(s): Attorney, character actor
- Years active: 1945–1954, 2002–2003
- Spouse: Zsa Zsa Gabor (m. 1983; ann. 1983)

Felipe de Alba (April 29, 1924 – November 15, 2005) was a Mexican attorney and character actor from the 1940s and 1950s. He appeared in films such as Robinson Crusoe (1954, directed by Luis Buñuel) and Real Women Have Curves (2002).

De Alba is also known for being briefly married to actress Zsa Zsa Gabor. His marriage to Gabor is considered one of the shortest celebrity marriages in history; they were married 13 April 1983, and their marriage was annulled the next day on 14 April 1983.

== Personal life ==
De Alba was briefly married to the actress Zsa Zsa Gabor. The wedding, however, was declared invalid, since the actress's prior marriage to Michael O'Hara had not been properly dissolved. The de Alba-Gabor union was annulled and they did not stay together. De Alba relocated to New York City, and died there in 2005.

== Filmography ==
Year	Title	Role	Notes
1945	Bugambilia	Invitado a fiesta	
1946	Bailando en las nubes		
1946	The Devourer	Pablo Ortega	
1946	El puente del castigo		
1947	A Gypsy in Jalisco		
1948	Si Adelita se fuera con otro	Rafael	
1948	¡Ay, Palillo, no te rajes!	Nicoás Soto	
1948	El gallero	Flavio	
1949	Yo dormí con un fantasma	Ricardo Rodrigo	
1949	Contra la ley de Dios		
1949	A Family Like Many Others	Héctor Cataño	
1949	Cuando los padres se quedan solos	Miguel	
1949	La familia Pérez	Roberto	
1949	Rough But Respectable	Enrique Méndez	
1949	Eterna agonía	Vallegomez	
1949	Canta y no llores...	Chuy Anaya	
1950	Love for Love	René	
1950	Mi querido capitán	Fernando	
1951	¡... Y murió por nosotros!	Don Salvador, el maestro	
1951	Red Fury	Maximiliano	
1951	Stronghold		
1951	Engagement Ring	Guillermo Ruiz (Memo)	
1952	The Martyr of Calvary	Andrés	
1952	Aquellos ojos verdes	Gustavo Real	
1952	Mujer de medianoche		
1953	Cinnamon Skin	Dr. Jorge Morales	
1953	The Loving Women	Fernando Mendoza Hijo	
1954	Robinson Crusoe	Captain Oberzo	
2002	Real Women Have Curves	Grandfather	
2003	El sueño de Elias	Elias	(final film role)

Husband of a Gabor Sister
Preceded by Michael O'Hara	Zsa Zsa - Eighth; April 13, 1983 – April 14, 1983; Annulled	Succeeded by Frédéric Prinz von Anhalt
