= Aurora Segura =

Mexican actress (1923–2002)

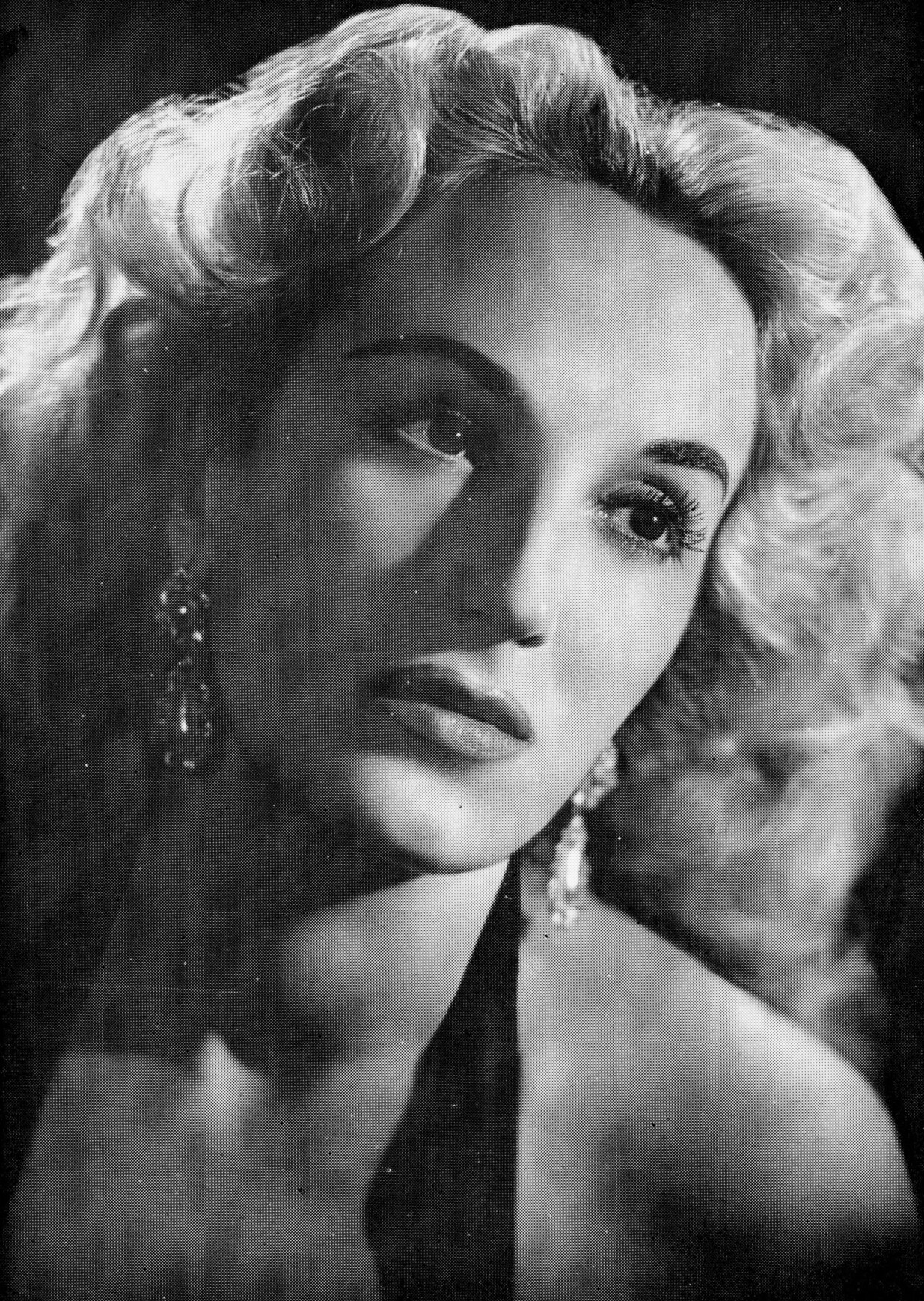
- Aurora Segura in 1954
- Born: 29 December 1923; Navarre, Spain
- Died: 2002 (aged 78–79)
- Occupation: Actress
- Years active: 1942–1962 (film)

Aurora Segura Lizuain (29 December 1923 – 2002) was a Mexican actress of the Golden Age of Mexican cinema.

Segura died in 2002.

== Selected filmography ==
- When the Night Ends (1950)
- Full Speed Ahead (1951)
- The Masked Tiger (1951)
- What Idiots Men Are (1951)
- The Island of Women (1953)
- The Naked Woman (1953)
- The Player (1953)
- The Vagabond (1953)
- You've Got Me By the Wing (1957)

== Bibliography ==
- Rogelio Agrasánchez. Guillermo Calles: A Biography of the Actor and Mexican Cinema Pioneer. McFarland, 2010.
