= María Victoria =

Mexican singer, actress and comedian (born 1923)

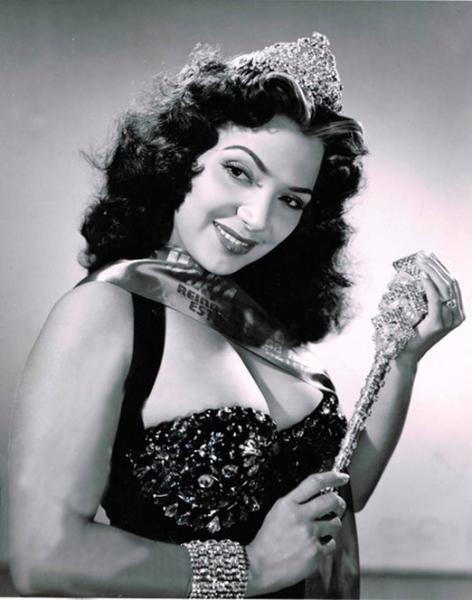
- María Victoria, c. 1950s
- Born: María Victoria Gutiérrez Cervantes; 26 February 1923 (age 103); Guadalajara, Jalisco, Mexico
- Other names: La Sirena de México (spanish for, "The Mermaid of Mexico")
- Occupations: Actress; comedian; singer
- Years active: c. 1940–2013
- Spouse: Rubén Zepeda Novelo (m. 1957; died 1974)
- Children: 3
- Musical career
- Genres: Bolero; Pop
- Instruments: Vocals
- Website: Official website (via Wayback Machine)

María Victoria Gutiérrez Cervantes (born 26 February 1923) is a Mexican actress, comedian and singer. Regarding music, she is known for her specialty in the genres of bolero and pop, using a distinctive vocal style that led her to be known as "pujiditos" (spanish for, "strain") when she sang.

Her figure, physical attractiveness and peculiar singing gave her considerable popularity, so in 1942, she entered the motion picture industry and debuted as an actress in the film Canto a las Américas, released in 1943. Following this, she established herself as a member of the Golden Age of Mexican Cinema, a period in which she stood out for productions such as: Mujeres de teatro (1951), Por qué peca la mujer (1952), Del rancho a la televisión (1953), Había una vez un marido (1953), Al son del charlestón (1954), Estoy taan enamorada (1954), Viva la juventud! (1956) and Pensión de artistas (1956). During and after the Golden age of Cinema, she faced constant censorship from the Decency League, a group of people with conservative ideas who disapproved of her lyrics, her dresses and her way of singing, as they considered it to be in bad taste for supposedly emphasizing the "immoral". In addition to this, her style and presence for singing, as well as her striking tight dresses, some of which used to have a cut at the bottom resembling the tail of a mermaid, gave her the nickname "La Sirena de México" (spanish for, "The Mermaid of Mexico") and positioned her as a sex symbol in 20th century Mexico.

Best remembered for playing Inocencia de la Concepción de Lourdes Escarabarzaleta de la Barquera y Dávalos Pandeada Derecha in the La criada bien criada franchise, her career spanned for 73 years, beginning around 1940 and ending in 2013. During her active path, she was part of the radio, the cinema, and the birth and early stages of television in Mexico.

== Early life ==
María Victoria Gutiérrez Cervantes was born in Guadalajara, Jalisco, the daughter of Leovigildo Gutiérrez Peña, a tailor dedicated to men's clothing design, and Maura Cervantes Prieto, a housewife. With accredited documents, it was believed that she was born in 1927, but in 2025, her grandchildren revealed that she was actually born in 1923. This fact was later supported by a Facebook page called "El Mundo de Elioth" (spanish for "Elioth's World"), which shared a screenshot of her birth certificate, revealing that it occurred on 26 February 1923.

She had five siblings, of whom she was the youngest and whose names were Julio, Martín, José, Esperanza and Elvira, but it is unknown who were from their mother's first marriage and who were from her second, since she married twice after becoming a widow.

== Career ==
As a singer, she specialised in the bolero and pop music genres, with hits such as "Cuidadito, cuidadito", "Así así", "Como un perro", "17 años", "Que divino", "Bien hecho", among others.

From 2011 to 2013, she was part of the cast of the play Perfume de Gardenia, after which she retired from the entertainment industry.

== Filmography ==
=== Film ===
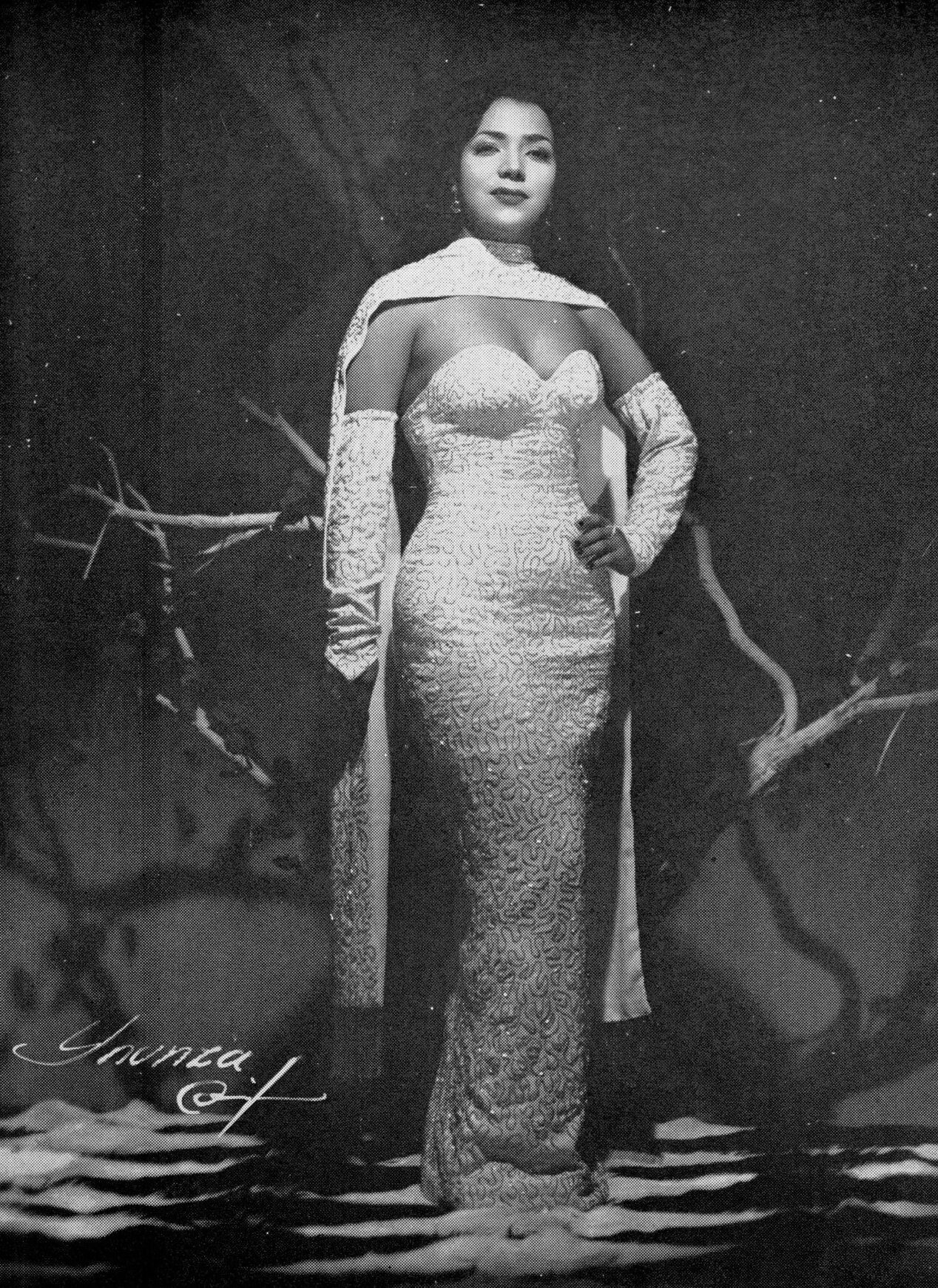
María Victoria in 1954

- Canto a las Américas (1942)
- Monte de Piedad (1950)
- Amor perdido (1951)
- Puerto de Tentación (1950)
- Serenata en Acapulco (1951)
- Mujeres de teatro (1951)
- Por qué peca la mujer (1951)
- Cuando los hijos pecan (1952)
- Póker de ases (1952)
- Sí... Mi vida (1952)
- Del rancho a la televisión (1952)
- Había una vez un marido (1952)
- La mujer desnuda (1953)
- Solamente una vez (1953)
- Al son del charlestón (1954)
- Estoy taan enamorada (1954)
- Los paquetes de Paquita (1954)
- Maldita ciudad (un drama cómico) (1954)
- Cupido pierde a Paquita (1954)
- Viva la juventud! (1955)
- Música en la noche (1955)
- Una movida chueca (1955)
- Pensión de Artistas (1956)
- Muertos de risa (1957)
- Pepito y los robachicos (1958)
- Mientras el cuerpo aguante (1958)
- Cada quién su música (1958)
- Tres Balas Perdidas (1960)
- Cucurrucucú Paloma (1964)
- La criada bien criada (1970)
- A fuego lento (1977)
- La criada maravilla (1978)
- Unos granujas decentes / Sor Metiche (1980)
- Las noches del Blanquita (1981)
- Welcome Maria (1990)
- Las mil y una aventuras del metro (1993)

=== Television ===
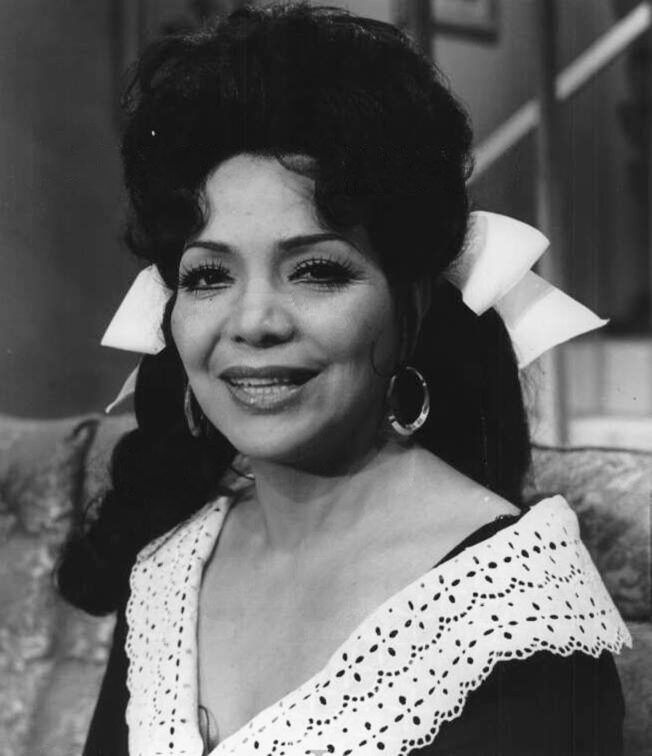
María dressed for La criada bien criada in 1974

- Domingos Herdez (1962)
- Enigma (1964)
- Premier Orfeon (1964)
- Estudio 1 (1966)
- La criada bien criada (1963-1980)
- Mis huéspedes (1980)
- La pasión de Isabela (1984)
- Las travesuras de Paquita (1984)
- Salón de belleza (1985)
- Baila conmigo (1992)
- María José (1995)
- Desencuentro (1997–1998)
- Cuento de Navidad (1999)
- Siempre te amaré (2000)
- La hora pico (2002)
- De pocas, pocas pulgas (2003)
- Mujer, casos de la vida real (2006)
- Sortilegio (2009)
- El minuto que cambió mi destino (2021)
- Mañanitas a la Virgen de Guadalupe (Televisa) (2021, 2022)

== See also ==
- List of centenarians (actors, filmmakers and entertainers)
