= Stronghold (film) =

1951 film by Steve Sekely

- Directed by: Steve Sekely
- Written by: Wells Root
- Produced by: Olallo Rubio
- Starring: Veronica Lake; Zachary Scott; Arturo de Córdova
- Narrated by: Olallo Rubio Gandara
- Cinematography: Stanley Cortez
- Edited by: Charles L. Kimball
- Music by: Antonio Díaz Conde
- Production company: Producciones Mexico
- Distributed by: Lippert Pictures
- Release dates: October 25, 1951 (Mexico); January 31, 1952 (Los Angeles)
- Running time: 72 minutes
- Countries: Mexico; United States
- Language: English

Stronghold is a 1951 American-Mexican Western historical film directed by Steve Sekely and starring Veronica Lake, Zachary Scott and Arturo de Córdova. A separate Spanish-language version titled Red Fury was also released. The cost of both films was $519,000.

== Plot ==
In 1865, Señora Stevens and her American daughter Maria leave the U.S. to return to Stevens' homeland of Mexico along with their servant Caesar. They hope to live peacefully under Emperor Maximilian. Maria's father and brother were killed fighting on opposite sides of the Civil War.

Maria, her mother and Caesar are kidnapped by the bandit Ignacio "Nacho" López as soon as they arrive in Mexico. Señora Stevens fakes a collapse, which allows Caesar to attack Lopez and the women to escape. They arrive at the estate of Don Pedro Álvarez, the son of an old friend of Señora Stevens and an ally of Benito Juárez, who is leading the fight against Maximilian.

Pedro sends Señora Stevens to Taxco but keeps Maria hostage until he receives a load of silver that he can trade for supplies. Eventually the silver arrives, along with Maria's maid Lupe, who gives her a note from Don Navarro asking her to bring Pedro with her when she is released. Pedro agrees to accompany her to Taxco. On the way, he shows Maria some of the suffering caused under Maximilian and she becomes more sympathetic to his plight.

Navarro's men attack Pedro but are ambushed by Pedro's troops and he escapes. In Taxco, Navarro invites Maria to a ball. On the way, Pedro abducts Maria briefly, but Navarro recaptures her. Maria meets Maximilian and Carlotta and asks them to help the poor. Lupe tells Maria that her mother has died. The empress secretly instructs her guards to send men to Taxco to hang Pedro so that Maria will marry Navarro, who will capture the Stevens' money.

Pedro is arrested at Señora Stevens' funeral. He escapes, but Navarro orders the detonation of explosives in the cavern to catch them, threatening the lives of numerous mine workers.

Pedro is about to be hanged when peasants arrive to rescue him, and the revolution against Maximilian begins.

== Cast ==
- Veronica Lake as Mary Stevens
- Zachary Scott as Don Miguel Navarro
- Rita Macedo as Beatriz Vega
- Arturo de Córdova as Don Pedro Alvarez
- Alfonso Bedoya as Ignacio "Nacho" López
- Yadira Jiménez as Lupe
- Fanny Schiller as Señora Stevens
- Gilberto González as José Vega
- Carlos Múzquiz as Diego Sánchez
- Frederick A. Mack as Caesar
- Roc Galván as Gustavo Rojo
- Iren Agay as Empress Carlotta
- Felipe de Alba as Emperor Maximilian

== Production ==
The film was Zachary Scott's first after he had finished his contract with Warner Bros. It was financed by Filmadora Studios, a Mexican company.

Filming started in April 1950 at Churubusco Studios in Mexico City and wrapped by June.

In the Spanish-language version, titled Red Fury, Sarita Montiel plays María, Emilia Guiú plays Beatriz Vega, Carlos López Moctezuma plays Don Miguel Navarro and Juan José Laboriel plays Caesar. Many of the supporting actors appear in both versions. Although Gustavo Rojo is billed in the English-language version, he does not appear in the film, as his character was eliminated.

== Reception ==
In the New York Daily News, critic Wanda Hale wrote: "Actually, 'Stronghold' is not a lengthy picture but it seems as though it takes about two hours in getting to the point of ousting the ruler and getting Miss Lake to switch from Zachary Scott's to Arturo de Cordova's side."

The Monthly Film Bulletin called the film "shoddy" with "none of the qualities one expects of Mexican productions. Little use is made of the natural beauties or the local inhabitants... Hard to follow and unconvincing".

== Legacy ==
Rights to the film transferred to Nacional Financiera SA, a Mexican government-controlled corporation. In 1962, a lawsuit was filed against the company claiming unpaid salaries of $142,375 plus interest. The claimants included Veronica Lake, Zachary Scott, Stanley Cortez, Steve Sekeley and Wells Root. Nacional Financiera SA asserted that the $13,628 that had been paid to the claimants in 1956 and 1958 represented payment in full. Lake's original claim was for $47,500.

== Bibliography ==
- Ronald L. Davis. Zachary Scott: Hollywood's Sophisticated Cad. Univ. Press of Mississippi, 2009.
