= A Gringo Girl in Mexico =

- Directed by: Julián Soler
- Written by: Janet Alcoriza; Luis Alcoriza; Alejandro Ciangherotti; Carlos León; Antonio Monsell
- Produced by: Alfredo Ripstein hijo
- Starring: Antonio Badú; Martha Roth; Óscar Pulido
- Cinematography: Rosalío Solano
- Edited by: Carlos Savage
- Music by: Gustavo César Carrión; Rosalío Ramírez
- Production company: Royal Films
- Release date: 27 April 1951
- Running time: 90 minutes
- Country: Mexico
- Language: Spanish

A Gringo Girl in Mexico (Spanish: Una gringuita en México) is a 1951 Mexican comedy film directed by Julián Soler and starring Antonio Badú, Martha Roth and Óscar Pulido.

== Cast ==
- Antonio Badú as Pablo
- Martha Roth as Barbara Smith
- Óscar Pulido as Atenogenes
- Fanny Schiller as Tía Rosa
- Aurora Walker as Doña Julia
- Roberto Coboa s Gabucho
- Amada Dosamantes as Benita, sirvienta
- Beatriz Saavedra as Silvia
- Roc Galván
- Wolf Ruvinskis
- Ernesto Finance
- Jaime Valdés
- Manuel Tamés hijo
- Enrique Zambrano
- Francisco Fuentes as Madaleno
- Estela Matute
- José Chávez
- Margarita Luna
- Hernán Vera
- José Pardavé
- Lupe Carriles
- Cecilia Leger
- Humberto Rodríguez

== Bibliography ==
- David E. Wilt. Stereotyped Images of United States Citizens in Mexican Cinema, 1930-1990. University of Maryland at College Park, 1991.
