= María Montecristo =

- Directed by: Luis César Amadori
- Written by: Grisha Malinin; Gabriel Peña
- Produced by: Gregorio Walerstein
- Starring: Zully Moreno; Arturo de Córdova; Carlos López Moctezuma
- Cinematography: Agustín Martínez Solares
- Edited by: Rafael Ceballos
- Production company: Cinematográfica Filmex
- Release date: 16 May 1951
- Running time: 120 minutes
- Country: Mexico
- Language: Spanish

María Montecristo is a 1951 Mexican drama film directed by Luis César Amadori and starring Zully Moreno, Arturo de Córdova and Carlos López Moctezuma.

The film's art direction was by Jorge Fernández.

== Main cast ==
- Zully Moreno as María Montecristo
- Arturo de Córdova as Hugo Galarza
- Carlos López Moctezuma as Avila
- Andrés Soler as Doctor Segura
- Jorge Reyes as Miguelito
- Dolores Tinoco as Renee
- Felipe Montoya as Señor cura
- Eduardo Arozamena as Professor Fabré
- Manuel Dondé as Lic. Suárez
- Pepe Martínez as Toño
- Antonio R. Frausto as Tomás
- José Muñoz as Boticario
- Maria Luisa Malvido
- Jorge Arriaga
- Juan Orraca
- Víctor Alcocer as Doctor
- Manuel Noriega

== Bibliography ==
- Goble, Alan. The Complete Index to Literary Sources in Film. Walter de Gruyter, 1999.
