= Love Was Her Sin =

1951 film

- Directed by: Rogelio A. González
- Written by: Rogelio A. González; Gregorio Walerstein
- Produced by: Gregorio Walerstein
- Starring: Elsa Aguirre; Jorge Mistral; Alma Rosa Aguirre
- Cinematography: Agustín Martínez Solares
- Edited by: Rafael Ceballos
- Music by: Antonio Díaz Conde
- Production company: Filmex
- Distributed by: Clasa-Mohme
- Release date: 11 October 1951
- Running time: 90 minutes
- Country: Mexico
- Language: Spanish

Love Was Her Sin (Spanish: Amar fue su pecado) is a 1951 Mexican drama film directed by Rogelio A. González and starring Elsa Aguirre, Jorge Mistral and Alma Rosa Aguirre. It was shot at the Azteca Studios in Mexico City. The film's sets were designed by the art director Jorge Fernández.

== Cast ==
- Elsa Aguirre as Elena
- Jorge Mistral as Jorge
- Alma Rosa Aguirre as Berta
- Andrés Soler as Padrino
- José Baviera as Mendoza
- Arturo Soto Rangel as Juez
- Delia Magaña as Empleada
- Salvador Quiroz as Juez
- Nicolás Rodríguez as Pintor
- Ramón Gay
- Víctor Alcocer
- Jorge Arriaga
- Pascual García Peña
- Humberto Rodríguez

== Bibliography ==
- Riera, Emilio García. Los hermanos Soler. Universidad de Guadalajara s, 1990
- Wilt, David E. The Mexican Filmography, 1916 through 2001. McFarland, 2024.
