= Sergio Guerrero (composer) =

Mexican composer (1921–2008)

- Born: 9 December 1921; Mexico City, Mexico
- Died: 26 January 2008 (aged 86); Mexico City, Mexico
- Other name: Sergio Guerrero Calderón
- Occupation: Composer
- Years active: 1950-1983 (film)

Sergio Guerrero (1921–2008) was a Mexican composer of film scores.

== Selected filmography ==
- Love for Sale (1951)
- Arrabalera (1951)
- A Galician Dances the Mambo (1951)
- Full Speed Ahead (1951)
- What Has That Woman Done to You? (1951)
- The Masked Tiger (1951)
- Passionflower (1952)
- The Naked Woman (1953)
- Genius and Figure (1953)
- The Spot of the Family (1953)
- Black Ace (1954)
- Magdalena (1955)
- Spring in the Heart (1956)
- Yesenia (1971)
- Roots of Blood (1978)

== Bibliography ==
- Ronald Schwartz. Latin American Films, 1932-1994: A Critical Filmography. McFarland, 2005.
