= The Absentee (1951 film) =

1951 film

- Directed by: Julio Bracho
- Written by: Neftali Beltrán; Julio Bracho
- Produced by: Julio Bracho
- Starring: Arturo de Córdova
- Cinematography: Alex Phillips
- Edited by: José W. Bustos
- Release date: 1951
- Running time: 112 minute
- Country: Mexico
- Language: Spanish

The Absentee (Spanish: La ausente) is a 1951 Mexican drama film directed by Julio Bracho. It was entered into the 1952 Cannes Film Festival.

== Plot ==
Jorge de la Cueva (Arturo de Córdova) is in great pain after his wife's death in a car accident. Hoping to discover what really happened, he decides to investigate the circumstances of the accident.

== Cast ==
- Arturo de Córdova - Jorge de la Cueva
- Rosita Quintana - Monica Sandoval
- Andrea Palma - Cecilia
- María Douglas - Magdalena
- Ramón Gay - Jaime
- Mimí Derba - Doña Elena, mother of isabel
- Natalia Ortiz - Maria, maid
- Carlos Riquelme - mechanic
- Manuel Sánchez Navarro - Rafael, butler
- Enrique Díaz 'Indiano' - father of Isabel
- Angélica María - Rosita
- Felipe Montoya - Dr Beltrán
