= Love for Sale (1951 film) =

1951 film

- Directed by: Joaquín Pardavé
- Written by: Luis Manrique; Joaquín Pardavé
- Produced by: Luis Manrique
- Starring: Fernando Fernández; Meche Barba; Óscar Pulido
- Cinematography: Agustín Martínez Solares
- Music by: Sergio Guerrero
- Production company: Filmex
- Release date: 7 February 1951
- Running time: 99 minutes
- Country: Mexico
- Language: Spanish

Love for Sale (Spanish:Amor vendido) is a 1951 Mexican musical crime drama film directed by Joaquín Pardavé and starring Fernando Fernández, Meche Barba and Óscar Pulido.

== Cast ==
- Fernando Fernández as Raúl
- Meche Barba as Adriana
- Óscar Pulido as Temístocles
- Sara Guasch as La Mamy
- Manolo Hernandez as Manolo
- Carlos Múzquiz as Detective Policía
- Eva Garza as Cantante
- Pascual García Peña as Don Pedro Nolasco
- Armando Velasco as Doctor de la Fuente
- Jorge Mondragon as Juez
- Carlos Valadez as Carlos Vela, el perfumado
- Freddy Fernández as Pichi
- Toña la Negra as Cantante
- Víctor Manuel Castro as Concursante baile
- Rafael Icardo as Don Fernando
- Inés Murillo as Vecina
- Juan Orraca as Detective policía
- Sergio Prado
- Victorio Blanco as Custodio
- Flora Alicia Campos as Vecina
- Rogelio Fernández as Complice del Perfumado
- Salvador Godínez as Complice del perfumado
- Georgina González as Espectadora juicio
- Ángel Infante as Mesero
- Carmen Manzano as Vecina
- Ignacio Peón as Vecino
- Roberto G. Rivera as Detectove policía
- José Wilhelmy as Concursante baile

== Bibliography ==
- Deborah R. Vargas. Dissonant Divas in Chicana Music: The Limits of la Onda. University of Minnesota Press, 2012.
