= José Baviera =

Spanish actor

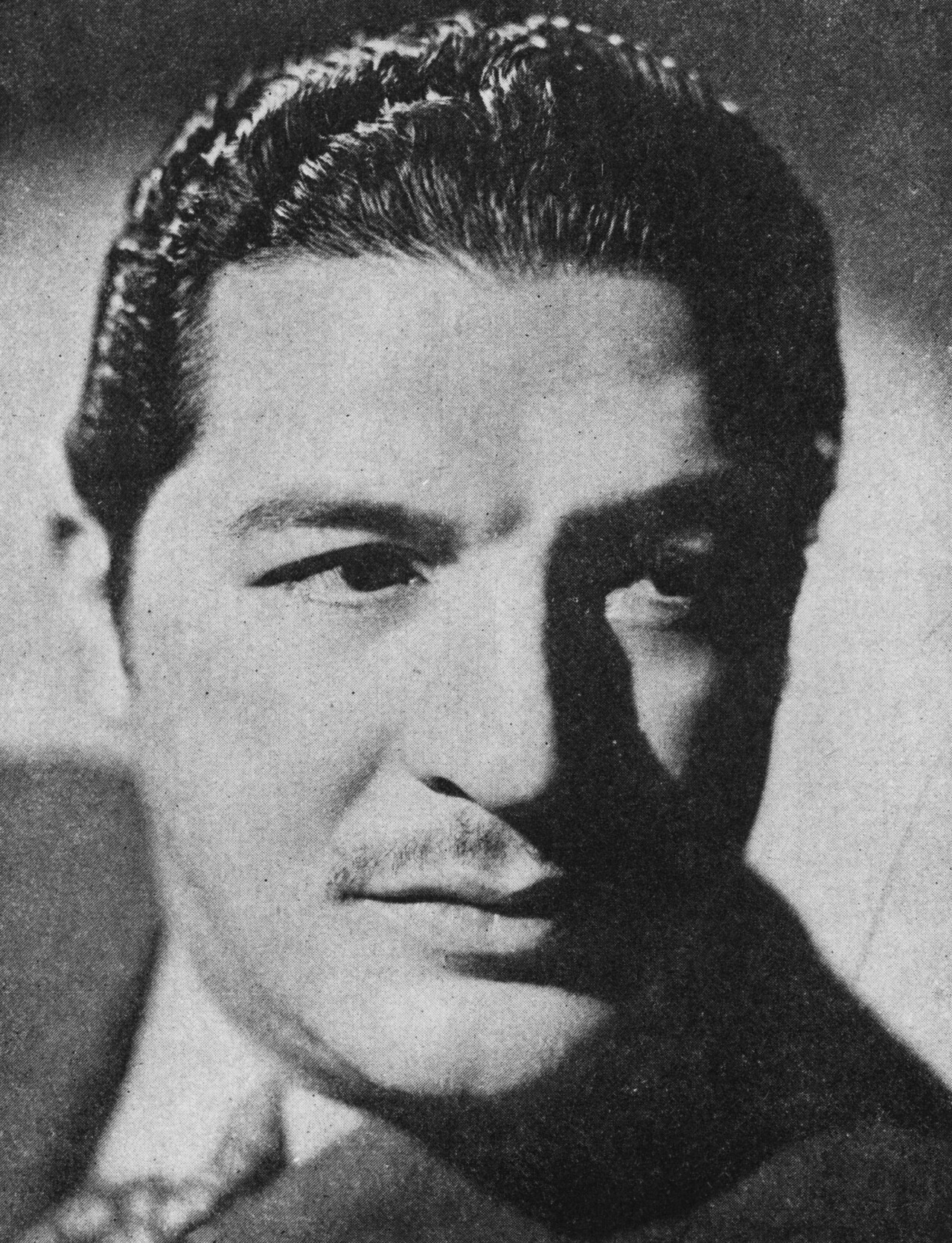
- Baviera in 1945
- Born: 17 August 1906; Valencia, Spain
- Died: 13 August 1981 (aged 74); Mexico City, Mexico
- Occupation: Actor
- Years active: 1924–1979

José Baviera (17 August 1906 – 13 August 1981) was a Spanish film actor. He appeared in more than 190 films and television shows between 1924 and 1979. He starred in Luis Buñuel's 1962 film The Exterminating Angel.

== Selected filmography ==
- The Cursed Village (1930)
- Barrios bajos (1937)
- Jesús de Nazareth (1942)
- Lightning in the South (1943)
- Christopher Columbus (1943)
- Land of Passions (1943)
- The Mulatta of Cordoba (1945)
- The Shack (1945)
- Caribbean Rose (1946)
- María Magdalena: Pecadora de Magdala (1946)
- Bel Ami (1947)
- Arsène Lupin (1947)
- Don't Marry My Wife (1947)
- You Have the Eyes of a Deadly Woman (1947)
- The Private Life of Mark Antony and Cleopatra (1947)
- Reina de reinas: La Virgen María (1948)
- Dueña y señora (1948)
- Beau Ideal (1948)
- The Last Night (1948)
- La familia Pérez(1949)
- Lola Casanova (1949)
- Philip of Jesus (1949)
- The Magician (1949)
- The Devil Is a Woman (1950)
- The Doorman (1950)
- El derecho de nacer (1951)
- A Galician Dances the Mambo (1951)
- Desired (1951)
- Love Was Her Sin (1951)
- Beauty Salon (1951)
- The Martyr of Calvary (1952)
- I Don't Deny My Past (1952)
- The Plebeian (1953)
- When You Come Back to Me (1953)
- The Price of Living (1954)
- It Happened in Mexico (1958)
- The Exterminating Angel (1962)
- The Partisan of Villa (1967)
- Corazón salvaje (1968)
- La endemoniada (1968)
