= A.T.M. ¡A toda máquina! =

- Directed by: Ismael Rodríguez
- Written by: Ismael Rodríguez; Pedro de Urdimalas
- Produced by: Luis Leal Solares
- Starring: Pedro Infante; Luis Aguilar; Aurora Segura; Alma Delia Fuentes
- Cinematography: Jack Draper
- Edited by: Rafael Portillo
- Music by: Sergio Guerrero; Raúl Lavista
- Release date: 13 September 1951
- Running time: 120 minutes
- Country: Mexico
- Language: Spanish

A.T.M. ¡A toda máquina! or ¡A toda máquina! (transl. Full Speed Ahead) is a 1951 Mexican police comedy film, produced, written, and directed by Ismael Rodríguez, and starring Pedro Infante, Luis Aguilar, Aurora Segura and Alma Delia Fuentes. It was followed by a sequel filmed the same year, ¿Qué te ha dado esa mujer?, which also featured actresses Carmen Montejo, Rosita Arenas, and Gloria Mange.

The story follows two young motorcycle traffic policemen, Pedro and Luis, in Mexico City. While close friends, they are also intense rivals, navigating humorous situations, romantic confusions, and lively musical performances. Set in mid-20th-century Mexico City, the film captures the charm of its characters and setting.

== Plot ==
Pedro Chávez is a drifter trying to rebuild his life, while Luis Macías is searching for a genuine friend. They meet during a motorcycle test for entry into the traffic academy—Luis as a participant, and Pedro as a mere spectator.

Despite having been taken advantage of many times before, Luis decides to give the drifter a chance. After they move in together, Luis is accepted into the squad for earning the highest score in the test. Pedro, inspired, decides to join as well, and through a mix of boldness and determination, he manages to get in.

From there, the trouble begins: it turns out Pedro is also an expert motorcyclist. The two start competing for the position of commander, a title that will go to whoever wins a major event to be held in Plaza México a few weeks later. Their rivalry extends far beyond work, affecting every aspect of their lives, turning their cohabitation into complete chaos.

As if that weren't enough, Pedro carries a "curse" he's had since childhood—anyone he shows affection to ends up suffering misfortune, whether it's a dog, a schoolteacher, or a woman. In fact, he was once imprisoned after admitting that a woman had been killed "because of him," after he showed her kindness.

Though both are looking for a sincere friendship, life's hardships have made them suspicious and overly sensitive. They constantly test each other's loyalty with tricks and pranks, sparking an endless cycle of revenge in which they're always "getting even."

Eventually, the day of the squad's big event arrives. Determined to outshine one another, they repeatedly go off-script with improvised stunts. When their rivalry puts the entire event at risk, both are suspended. But they decide to defy the punishment and perform the final act anyway: "the house on fire," a stunt where they must ride through a burning wooden house. They fire up their motorcycles and charge into the tunnel, each trying to beat the other. As they enter the flaming house, it explodes. Both are rushed to the hospital in an ambulance.

Badly injured, they finally drop their defenses and admit that all their animosity had really masked a deep, long-sought friendship. Pedro reaches out to Luis—just as the ambulance crashes. Despite the dramatic accident, both survive. Ignoring Pedro's so-called curse, they shake hands once again.

== Cast ==
- Pedro Infante as Pedro Chávez
- Luis Aguilar as Luis Macías
- Aurora Segura as Guillermina
- Alma Delia Fuentes as Anita
- Delorice Archer as the little American girl
- Emma Rodríguez as Doña Angustias
- Carlos Valadez as Tarcisio
- Consuelo Pastor as María Luisa
- Amelia Wilhelmy as the old lady motorist
- Pedro de Urdimalas as the announcer
- Ángel Infante as the commander
- Salvador Quiroz as the general
- Luis Leal Solares as the commander
- Alfonso Carti as the police officer
- Jorge Casanova as the scandalous man
- José Chávez as Pépe's minion
- Manuel de la Vega as Pépe, the jealous boyfriend
- Magda Donato as Mrs. Hayworth
- Pedro Elviro as the begar
- Ana María Hernández as the club patron
- Rogelio 'Frijolitos' Jiménez Pons as Doña Angustias' son
- Myron Levine as the club patron
- Blanca Marroquín as the ambulance nurse
- Pepe Martínez as the majordomo
- Héctor Mateos as the majordomo at the quinceañera
- Francisco Pando as the guest
- Carlos Rincón Gallardo as Angustias' husband
- Ismael Rodríguez as the man who hangs up the phone
- Ángela Rodríguez as the passenger in Guillermina's car
- Beatriz Saavedra as the passenger in Guillermina's car
- Salvador Terroba as Pépe's minion
- Manuel Trejo Morales as the ambulance doctor
- Hilda Vera as guest

== Reception ==
This film holds the 55th spot on the list of the 100 greatest films in Mexican cinema, according to a panel of 25 critics and film experts in Mexico, as published by Somos magazine in July 1994.

== Bibliography ==
- Juanita Heredia. Transnational Latina Narratives in the Twenty-first Century. Palgrave Macmillan, 2009.
