= Los viejos somos así =

- Directed by: Joaquín Pardavé
- Starring: Joaquín Pardavé, Elsa Aguirre, Alma Rosa Aguirre
- Release date: 1948
- Running time: 89 minute
- Country: Mexico
- Language: Spanish

Los viejos somos así is a 1948 Mexican comedy-drama film directed by Joaquín Pardavé, and starring Pardavé, alongside the Aguirre sisters, Elsa Aguirre and Alma Rosa Aguirre.
