= Alma Rosa Aguirre =

Mexican actress (1929–2025)

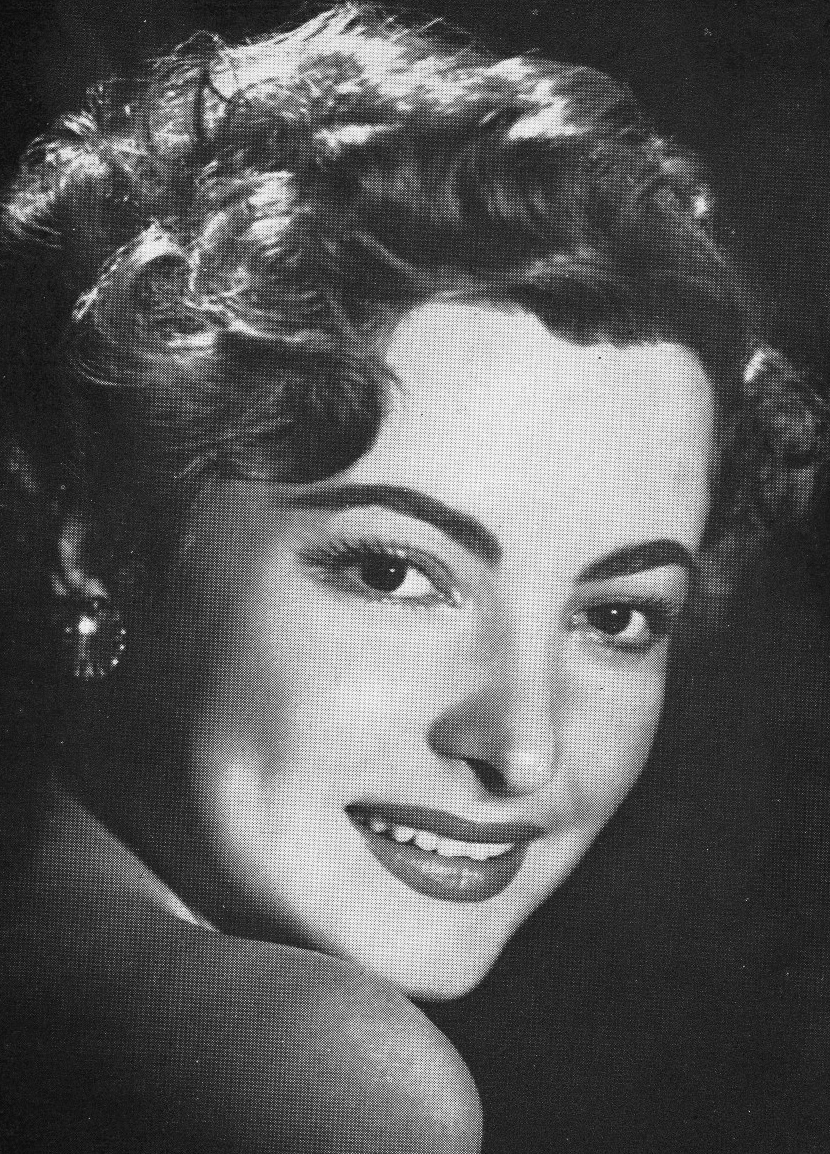
- Aguirre in 1954
- Born: Alma Rosa Aguirre Juárez; 7 February 1929; Ciudad Juárez, Chihuahua, Mexico
- Died: 27 January 2025 (aged 95); Mexico City, Mexico
- Occupation: Actress
- Years active: 1946–1973
- Children: 1
- Family: Elsa Aguirre (sister)

Alma Rosa Aguirre Juárez (7 February 1929 – 27 January 2025) was a Mexican actress. Aguirre died in Mexico City on 27 January 2025, at the age of 95. At the time of her death, she was one of the last surviving stars from the Golden Age of Mexican Cinema.

== Selected filmography ==
- El Sexo Fuerte (1946)
- El Pasajero Diez Mil (1946)
- Los viejos somos así (1948)
- La familia Pérez (1949)
- A Galician in Mexico (1949)
- Nosotras las Taquígrafas (1950)
- El Siete Machos (1951)
- Canasta uruguaya (1951)
- Love Was Her Sin (1951)
- We Maids (1951)
- The Border Man (1952)
- Seven Women (1953)
- The Sin of Being a Woman (1955)
- El fantasma de la casa roja (1956)
- Entre Monjas Anda el Diablo (1972)
