= Jorge Mondragón (actor) =

Mexican actor

Jorge Mondragón Roldán (April 30, 1903 in Mexico City – April 30, 1997 in Mexico City) was a Mexican actor. His best-known television roles were in Una mujer marcada, Yo no pedí vivir, and Bodas de odio. He also appeared in several historical soap operas by Ernesto Alonso, such as El carruaje, in the role of Melchor Ocampo, and played the characters Valentín Gómez Farías and Eulogio Gillow in El vuelo del águila.

== Selected filmography ==
- Bel Ami (1947)
- Ecija's Seven Children (1947)
- The Secret of Juan Palomo (1947)
- Five Faces of Woman (1947)
- A Gypsy in Jalisco (1947)
- The Prince of the Desert (1947)
- The Desire (1948)
- The Magician (1949)
- Lost (1950)
- My General's Women (1951)
- Love for Sale (1951)
- What Idiots Men Are (1951)
- The Atomic Fireman (1952)
- I Don't Deny My Past (1952)
- The King of Mexico (1956)
- The Aztec Mummy (1957)
- His First Love (1960)
- The Pulque Tavern (1981)
