= Arturo de Córdova =

Mexican actor

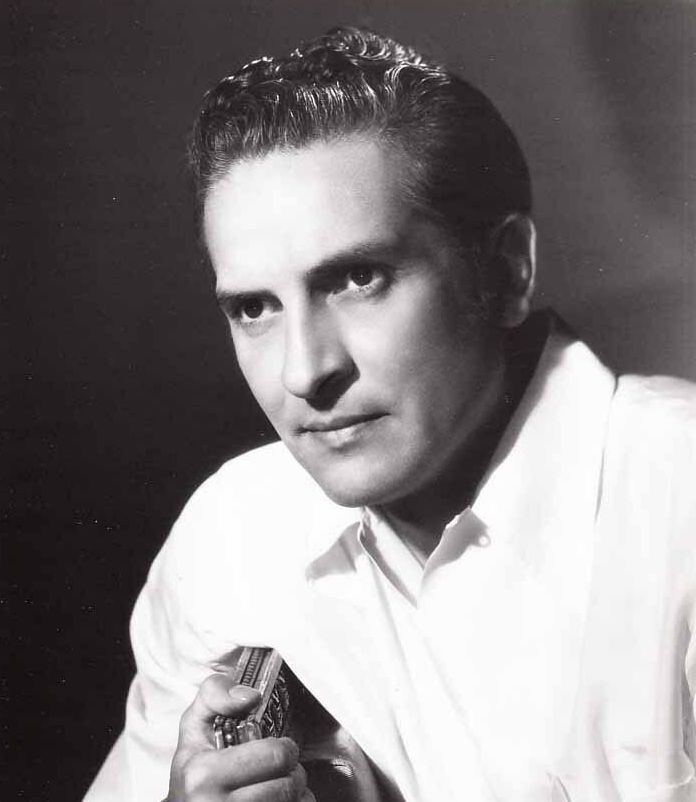
- Arturo de Córdova, 1948
- Born: Arturo García Rodríguez; 8 May 1908; Mérida, Yucatán, Mexico
- Died: 3 November 1973 (aged 65); Mexico City, Mexico
- Occupation: Actor
- Years active: 1930s–1973
- Spouse: Enna Arana (m. 1933; div. 1963)
- Partner: Marga López (1964–1973)
- Awards: Ariel Award for Best Actor (1952) – En la palma de tu mano; Ariel Award for Best Actor (1954) – Las tres perfectas casadas; Ariel Award for Best Actor (1958) – Feliz año, amor mío

Arturo García Rodríguez (8 May 1908 – 3 November 1973), known professionally as Arturo de Córdova, was a Mexican actor who appeared in over a hundred films.

== Biography ==
=== Career ===
Arturo García Rodríguez was born in Mérida, Yucatán on 8 May 1908. Most of Córdova's films were made in Mexico and he became a major motion picture actor in Latin America and Spain, winning three Silver Ariels and received four other nominations. Córdova starred in several American films during the 1940s including For Whom the Bell Tolls (1943), Frenchman's Creek (1944), Incendiary Blonde (1945), and New Orleans (1947).

=== Personal life and death ===
He was married to Enna de Arana and in a relationship with actress Marga López from 1964 until his death. Córdova died from a stroke in Mexico City in 1973.

== Filmography ==
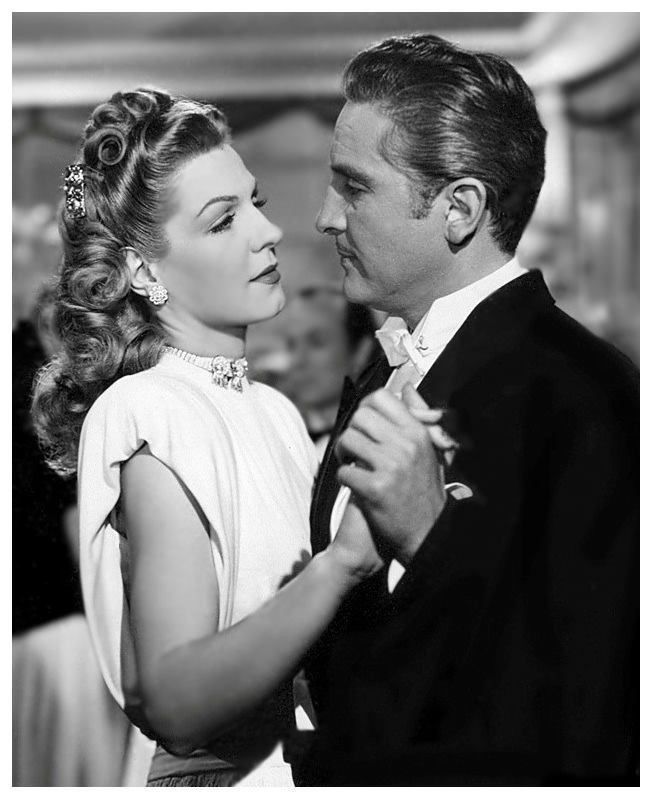
Arturo and Zully Moreno in Dios se lo pague (May God Reward You) (1947).

Year	Title	Role	Notes
1936	Celos	Federico	
1936	Cielito lindo	Felipe Vélez	
1937	¡Esos hombres!	Fernando de la Peña	
1937	Ave sin rumbo	Fernando Noriega "Juan Torres"	Alternative title: Wandering Bird
1937	La paloma	Capitán Montero	
1938	La Zandunga	Juancho	
1938	While Mexico Sleeps	Federico La Cierva	
1938	Refugiados en Madrid	Carlos	
1938	Hombres del mar	Emilio	
1938	Mientras México duerme	Federico La Cierva	
1938	Canto a mi tierra		Uncredited
1939	The House of the Ogre	El gato encerrado	
1939	La bestia negra	Toño	
1939	El milagro de la calle mayor	Carlos	
1939	La noche de los mayas	Uz	
1940	Odio		
1940	¡Que viene mi marido!	Lázaro Bermejo	
1940	Mala yerba	Gertrudis	
1940	Hombre o demonio		
1941	El secreto del sacerdote		
1941	El milagro de Cristo	Rolando Miguel	
1941	Oh, What Times, Don Simon!	Miguel	
1941	Five Minutes of Love	Rafael de la Torre	
1942	¿Quién te quiere a tí?	Manolo / Manuel San Juan	
1942	¡Cuando la tierra tembló!	El escéptico	
1942	The Count of Monte Cristo	Edmundo Dantés / Conde de Montecristo	
1942	Alejandra	Ricardo	
1943	For Whom the Bell Tolls	Agustín	
1943	Hostages	Paul Breda	
1944	Frenchman's Creek	Jean Benoit Aubrey	
1945	Twilight	Alejandro Mangino	
1945	A Medal for Benny	Joe Morales	
1945	Incendiary Blonde	Bill Romero Kilgannon	
1945	Duffy's Tavern	Himself	
1945	Masquerade in Mexico	Manolo Segovia	
1945	La selva de fuego	Luciano	
1946	Su última aventura	Raúl Llanos	
1947	Five Faces of Woman	Roberto	
1947	New Orleans	Nick Duquesne	
1947	The Kneeling Goddess	Antonio Ituarte	
1948	Adventures of Casanova	Casanova	
1948	God Reward You	Mario Alvarez	
1948	Algo flota sobre el agua	Manuel	
1948	Passport to Rio	Ramón Machando	
1949	Midnight	Daniel Benitez	
1949	Yo no elegí mi vida		
1950	Nacha Regules	Fernando Monsalvat	
1950	Fascinación		Alternative title: Fascination
1950	The Yacht Isabel Arrived This Afternoon		
1950	The Man Without a Face	Juan Carlos Lozano	
1950	Fuego sagrado		
1951	María Montecristo	Hugo Galarza	
1951	In the Palm of Your Hand	Profesor Jaime Karin	
1951	Stolen Paradise	Doctor Carlos de la Vega	
1951	Red Fury	Don Pedro Álvarez	
1951	Stronghold	Don Pedro Álvarez	
1952	My Wife and the Other One	Antonio del Villar	
1952	The Absentee	Jorge de la Cueva	
1952	Te sigo esperando	Arturo Montesinos	
1952	Soledad's Shawl	Dr. Alberto Robles	
1952	When the Fog Lifts	Pablo	
1953	The Three Perfect Wives	Gustavo Ferran	
1953	Forbidden Fruit	Marcos Villarreal	
1953	Él	Francisco Galván de Montemayor	
1953	Reportaje	Bernardo, newspaper's owner	
1954	The Price of Living		
1954	La entrega	Alejandro Gómez	
1954	Soledad		
1955	Un extraño en la escalera	Alberto Nuñez	
1955	Amor en cuatro tiempos	Arturo Celis	
1955	The Red Fish	Hugo Pascal	
1955	Mãos Sangrentas	Adriano / Rick Marson	
1955	Leonora of the Seven Seas		
1956	La herida luminosa	Dr. Enrique Molinos	
1956	Bodas de oro		
1956	Canasta de cuentos mexicanos	Pierre Duval	(segment "Solución inesperada, Una")
1957	Feliz año, amor mío	Ricardo Caso	
1957	La ciudad de los niños	Padre Álvarez	
1958	A media luz los tres	Alfredo	
1958	Miércoles de ceniza	Dr. Federico Lamadrid	
1958	Ama a tu prójimo	Nicolás Ramiro Diez	
1958	El hombre que me gusta	Sergio Garza González	
1958	El hombre que logró ser invisible	Carlos / Charles Hill	
1959	Mi esposa me comprende		
1959	Mis padres se divorcian	Fernando Guerrero	
1959	Isla para dos	Miguel Reyes	Alternative title: Island for Two
1960	El amor que yo te di	Andres Banister	
1960	El esqueleto de la señora Morales	Dr. Morales	Alternative title: Skeleton of Mrs. Morales
1960	La cigüeña dijo sí		
1961	Hay alguien detrás de la puerta	Carlos	
1961	Los hermanos Del Hierro	Narrator	
1962	El amor de los amores	Fernando	
1962	Pecado de juventud	Lic. Gumersindo Durán	
1962	Cena de matrimonios	Carlos	
1965	El amor no es pecado (El cielo de los pobres)	Juan	
1965	El pecador	Mario	Alternative title: Sinful
1965	The Gangster	Antonio Paredes / Tony Wall	
1966	Despedida de soltera	Narrador	
1966	La recta final	Narrador	
1966	¿Qué haremos con papá?	Juan José Gómez	
1966	Juventud sin ley	Licenciado Luis Ordorica	
1966	Matar es fácil	Ángel Urquiza	
1967	Los perversos	Padre Miguel Antonio	
1969	Cuando acaba la noche	Doctor Mario Salinas	
1970	La agonía de ser madre	Luis García	Alternative title: Agony to Be a Mother
1971	El profe	Gobernador	Alternative title: The Professor (final film role)

== Awards and nominations ==
Year	Award	Result	Category	Film
1946	Ariel Award	Nominated	Best Actor (Mejor Actuación Masculina)	La selva de fuego
1950	Ariel Award	Nominated	Best Actor (Mejor Actuación Masculina)	Medianoche
1951	Ariel Award	Nominated	Best Actor (Mejor Actuación Masculina)	El hombre sin rostro
1952	Ariel Award	Won	Best Actor (Mejor Actuación Masculina)	En la palma de tu mano
1953	Ariel Award	Nominated	Best Actor (Mejor Actuación Masculina)	Mi esposa y la otra
1954	Ariel Award	Won	Best Actor (Mejor Actuación Masculina)	Las tres perfectas casadas
1958	Ariel Award	Won	Best Actor (Mejor Actuación Masculina)	Feliz año, amor mío
