= Canasta uruguaya =

- Directed by: René Cardona
- Written by: Luis Alcoriza; Janet Alcoriza; Edmundo Báez; Egon Eis
- Produced by: Gustavo A. Campomanes; Oscar Prieto Montanari; Olallo Rubio Gandara
- Starring: Abel Salazar; Alma Rosa Aguirre; Jorge Reyes
- Cinematography: Domingo Carrillo
- Edited by: George Crone
- Music by: Felipe Bermejo, Antonio Díaz Conde
- Release date: 1 November 1951 (Mexico)
- Running time: 91 min
- Country: Mexico
- Language: Spanish

Canasta uruguaya ("Uruguayan Basket") is a 1951 Mexican film. It was written by Luis Alcoriza.

== Cast ==
- Abel Salazar
- Alma Rosa Aguirre
- Jorge Reyes
- Sara Montes
- Sara Guasch
- Dolores Camarillo
- Florencio Castelló
