= The Masked Tiger =

- Directed by: Zacarías Gómez Urquiza
- Written by: Zacarías Gómez Urquiza; Luis Manrique
- Starring: Luis Aguilar; Flor Silvestre; Aurora Segura
- Cinematography: Raúl Martínez Solares
- Edited by: Juan José Marino
- Music by: Sergio Guerrero
- Production company: Producciones Luis Manrique
- Release date: 13 September 1951
- Running time: 90 minutes
- Country: Mexico
- Language: Spanish

The Masked Tiger (Spanish:El tigre enmascarado) is a 1951 Mexican western film directed by Zacarías Gómez Urquiza and starring Luis Aguilar, Flor Silvestre and Aurora Segura.

The film's art direction was by Jorge Fernández.

== Cast ==
- Luis Aguilar as Luis Landa, El tigre enmascarado
- Flor Silvestre as Rosita
- Aurora Segura as Rigoleta
- Francisco Avitia as Don Pepe
- Emma Roldán as Doña Rebeca
- Pascual García Peña as Picardia
- Carlos Valadez as El Cortado
- Roberto G. Rivera
- José L. Murillo as Justo
- Agustín Fernández as Don Tomás
- Victorio Blanco as Don Raúl
- Rogelio Fernández as Espectador
- Eufrosina García as Soledad
- José René Ruiz as Enano

== Bibliography ==
- Pitts, Michael R. Western Movies: A Guide to 5,105 Feature Films. McFarland, 2012.
