= A Galician Dances the Mambo =

1951 film

- Directed by: Emilio Gómez Muriel
- Written by: Gregorio Walerstein; Joaquín Pardavé
- Produced by: Gregorio Walerstein
- Starring: Niní Marshall; Joaquín Pardavé; Silvia Pinal
- Cinematography: Agustín Martínez Solares
- Edited by: Rafael Ceballos
- Music by: Sergio Guerrero
- Production company: Filmex
- Distributed by: Clasa-Mohme
- Release date: 18 May 1951
- Running time: 93 minutes
- Country: Mexico
- Language: Spanish

A Galician Dances the Mambo (Spanish: Una gallega baila mambo) is a 1951 Mexican comedy film directed by Emilio Gómez Muriel and starring Niní Marshall, Joaquín Pardavé and Silvia Pinal. It was shot at the Azteca Studios in Mexico City. The film's sets were designed by the art director Jorge Fernández.

== Synopsis ==
Cándida, a Spaniard from an aristocratic background, moved to Mexico many years before with her husband. She now lives there with her daughter, and pretends that her long-dead husband is still alive in order to keep receiving a stipend from his family back home.

== Cast ==
- Niní Marshall as Cándida
- Joaquín Pardavé as Cleofas Martínez
- Silvia Pinal as Carmina
- Pepe del Río as Gilberto Sánchez
- Miguel Arenas as don Fernando de la Colina
- José Pulido as Ricardo
- Antonio Bravo as Martín, mayordomo
- Celia Viveros as Maurelia
- Los Panchos as Themselves
- Toña la Negra as Cantante
- Víctor Alcocer as Jefe de chofer
- José Baviera as don Leoncio
- María Gentil Arcos as Compañera de juego de Cándida
- Ana María Hernández as Invitada a graduación
- Elodia Hernández as doña Gertrudis
- Francisco Pando as don Fabián
- Aurora Walker as Señorita directora

== Bibliography ==
- Posadas, Abel. Niní Marshall: desde un ayer lejano. Ediciones Colihue SRL, 1993.
