= Women Without Tomorrow =

- Directed by: Tito Davison
- Written by: Julio Alejandro; Jesús Cárdenas; Tito Davison
- Produced by: Óscar J. Brooks; Ernesto Enríquez; Felipe Mier
- Starring: Leticia Palma; Manolo Fábregas; Carmen Montejo
- Cinematography: Agustín Martínez Solares
- Edited by: Rafael Ceballos
- Music by: Carlos Tirado
- Production company: Mier y Brooks
- Release date: 5 September 1951
- Running time: 115 minutes
- Country: Mexico
- Language: Spanish

Women Without Tomorrow (Spanish: Mujeres sin mañana) is a 1951 Mexican drama film directed by Tito Davison and starring Leticia Palma, Manolo Fábregas and Carmen Montejo.

The film's art direction was by Edward Fitzgerald.

== Cast ==
- Leticia Palma as Margot / María Elena
- Manolo Fábregas as Willy Stevens
- Carmen Montejo as Marta
- Carlos Cores as Antonio
- Andrea Palma as Olga / Ángela Ederly
- Andrés Soler as don Ángel Serrano
- Conchita Carracedo as Beatriz / Nuria
- Rebeca Iturbide as La Beba
- Irma Dorantes as Alicia
- Ramón Gay as Eduardo
- Armando Sáenz as Carlos
- Francisco Jambrina as Horacio
- Wolf Ruvinskis as Juan
- Amada Dosamantes as Eugenia
- Nicolás Rodríguez as Cliente de cabaret
- Jorge Arriaga as Domingo, guardaespaldas
- Julio Ahuet as Justino, guardaespaldas
- Juan Pulido as Jacobo
- Olga Donoso as Titina
- Eva Garza as Cantante
- Víctor Alcocer as Cliente de cabaret
- Daniel Arroyo as Cliente cabaret
- Stephen Berne as Cliente gringo cabaret
- Victorio Blanco as Mesero
- Julio Daneri as Manejador de juegos
- Manuel de la Vega as Cliente cabaret
- Héctor Godoy as Quique
- Bertha Lehar as Amiga de Maruja
- Pepe Martínez as Mesero
- Ángel Merino as Cliente de cabaret
- Consuelo Monteagudo as Maruja
- José Muñoz as Ernesto, cantinero
- Jesús Valero as don Alfonso

== Bibliography ==
- Deborah R. Vargas. Dissonant Divas in Chicana Music: The Limits of la Onda. University of Minnesota Press, 2012.
