= Óscar Pulido =

Mexican actor

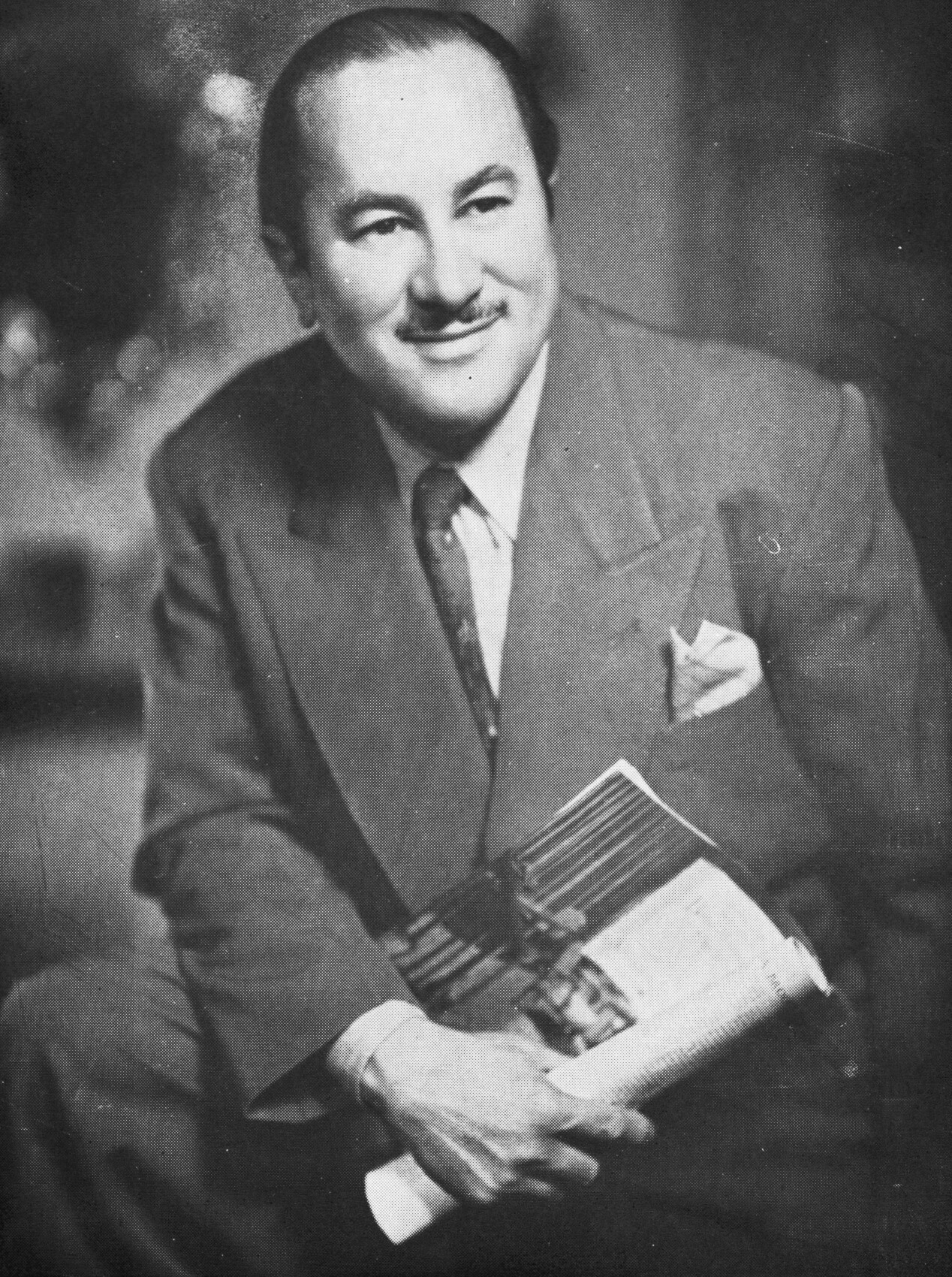
Óscar Pulido in 1954

Óscar Pulido (2 February 1906–16 May 1974) was a Mexican actor who acted in over 100 Mexican films.

In the National Association of Actors gave him the Virginia Fábregas medal as a lifetime achievement recognition.

== Selected filmography ==
- The Unknown Policeman (1941)
- A Day with the Devil (1945)
- The Game Rooster (1948)
- The Last Night (1948)
- Two of the Angry Life (1948)
- Rough But Respectable (1949)
- Autumn and Spring (1949)
- The Magician (1949)
- Love for Love (1950)
- When the Night Ends (1950)
- The Doorman (1950)
- A Gringo Girl in Mexico (1951)
- Serenade in Acapulco (1951)
- Kill Me Because I'm Dying! (1951)
- Love for Sale (1951)
- Hot Rhumba (1952)
- School for Tramps (1955)
- Barefoot Sultan (1956)
- Golden Legs (1958)
- A Thousand and One Nights (1958)
- Three Black Angels (1960)
- Chucho el Roto (1960)
