= Gregorio Walerstein =

Mexican film producer

- Born: Gregorio Walerstein Weinstock; 22 February 1913; Mexico City, Mexico
- Died: 24 January 2002 (aged 88); Mexico City, Mexico
- Occupations: Film producer Screenwriter
- Years active: 1941–1989
- Children: Mauricio Walerstein (1945–2016)
- Relatives: Marcela Walerstein (granddaughter)

Gregorio Walerstein Weinstock (22 February 1913 – 24 January 2002) was a Mexican film producer and screenwriter of Jewish descent. He produced 193 films between 1941 and 1989. His productions include Ash Wednesday (1958), which was entered into the 8th Berlin International Film Festival, and La Valentina (1966), his last collaboration with actress María Félix. He also discovered actresses Flor Silvestre, Ofelia Montesco, and Hilda Aguirre.

== Selected filmography ==
- Alejandra (1942)
- The Count of Monte Cristo (1942)
- My Memories of Mexico (1944)
- The Two Orphans (1944)
- Everybody's Woman (1946)
- The Operetta Queen (1946)
- The Road to Sacramento (1946)
- The Thief (1947)
- Bel Ami (1947)
- The Private Life of Mark Antony and Cleopatra (1947)
- Maclovia (1948)
- Midnight (1949)
- A Galician in Mexico (1949)
- The Perez Family (1949)
- The Devil Is a Woman (1950)
- Primero soy mexicano (1950)
- Orange Blossom for Your Wedding (1950)
- Red Rain (1950)
- The Little House (1950)
- A Galician Dances the Mambo (1951)
- María Montecristo (1951)
- Love Was Her Sin (1951)
- Now I Am Rich (1952)
- A Place Near Heaven (1952)
- The Island of Women (1953)
- The Naked Woman (1953)
- You've Got Me By the Wing (1953)
- The Three Perfect Wives (1953)
- Camelia (1954)
- Un extraño en la escalera (1955)
- Ash Wednesday (1958)
- La fièvre monte à El Pao (1959)
- Young People (1961)
- La Valentina (1966)
- The Bricklayer (1975)
- Spicy Chile (1983)
