= Serenade in Acapulco =

1951 film

- Directed by: Chano Urueta
- Written by: Eduardo Galindo; Chano Urueta
- Produced by: Pedro Galindo
- Starring: Martha Roth; Óscar Pulido; Andrés Soler
- Cinematography: Víctor Herrera
- Edited by: José W. Bustos
- Music by: Jorge Pérez
- Production company: Filmadora Chapultepec
- Distributed by: Clasa-Mohme
- Release date: 23 February 1951
- Running time: 106 minutes
- Country: Mexico
- Language: Spanish

Serenade in Acapulco (Spanish: Serenata en Acapulco) is a 1951 Mexican musical comedy film directed by Chano Urueta and starring Martha Roth, Óscar Pulido and Andrés Soler. The film's sets were designed by the art director Ramón Rodríguez Granada.

== Cast ==
- Martha Roth as Alicia del Valle
- Roberto Romaña as Luis Bravo
- Óscar Pulido as Don Ramón Constancia
- Andrés Soler as Don Aurelio del Valle, gerente hotel
- Raúl Martinez as Raúl
- Joaquín García "Borolas" as Pancho
- Alfonso Iglesias Padre as Aniceto, administrador hotel
- Glòria Martí as La rorra Benitez
- Trío Calaveras as Trio
- Dolly Sisters as Bailarinas
- María Victoria as Cantante
- Los Diamantes as Cantantes
- Chelo La Rue
- Dámaso Pérez Prado as Pérez Prado
- Arturo Castro 'Bigotón' as Señor Félix Martínez
- Enrique del Castillo as Alfonso
- Pedro Elviro as Huesped hotel
- Georgina González as Huesped hotel
- Manuel Trejo Morales as José, empleado hotel

== Bibliography ==
- Amador, María Luisa. Cartelera cinematográfica, 1950-1959. UNAM, 1985.
- Izaguirre, Rodolfo. El cine: belleza de lo imposible. Editorial Panapo, 1995.
- Riera, Emilio García. Los hermanos Soler. Universidad de Guadalajara s, 1990
