= Martha Roth =

Italian born Mexican actress (1932–2016)

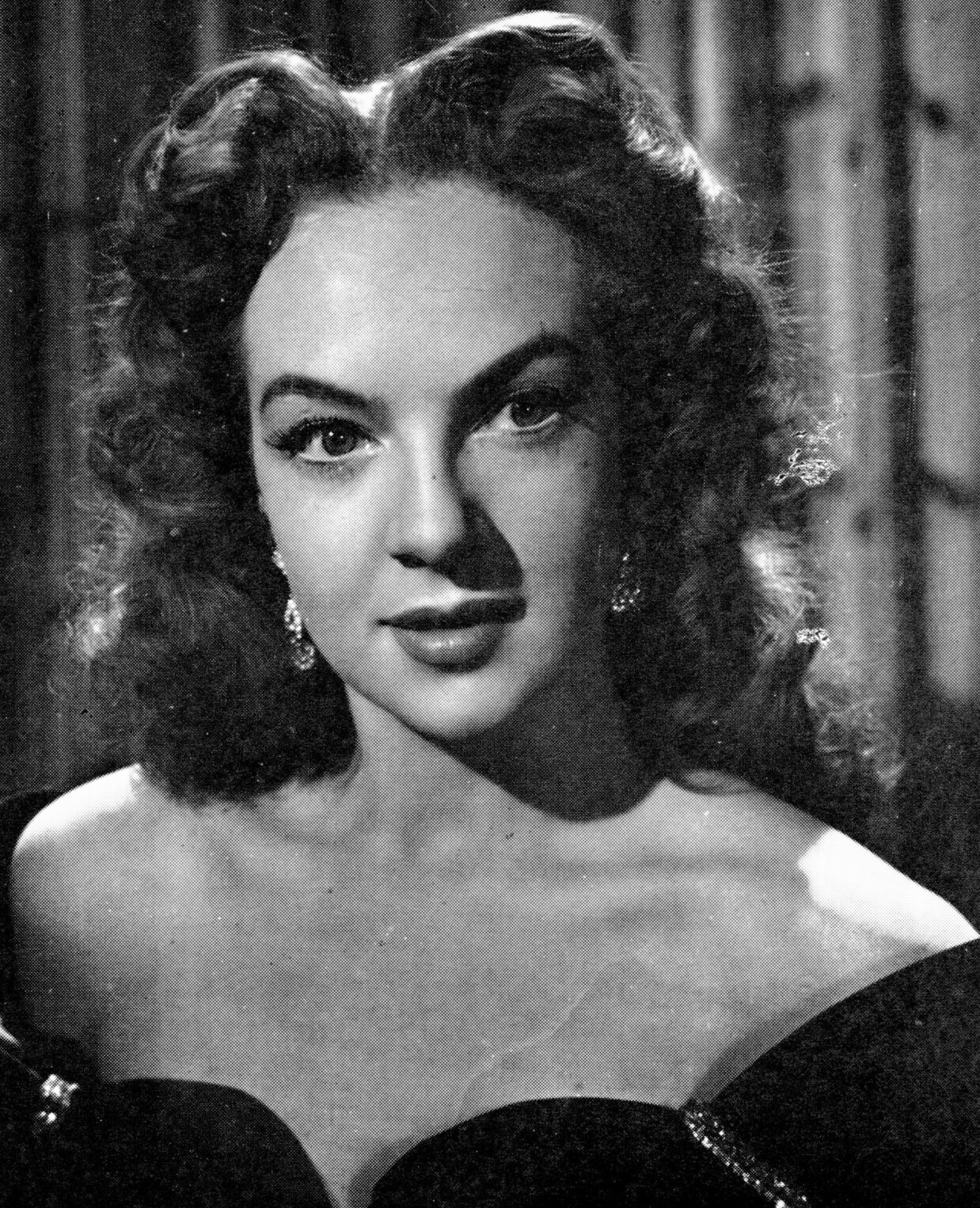
- Roth in 1954
- Born: Martha Roth Pizzo; 29 May 1932; Padua, Italy
- Died: 7 October 2016 (aged 84); Mexico City, Mexico
- Occupation: Actress
- Years active: 1948–2007

Martha Roth (29 May 1932 – 7 October 2016) was an Italian-born Mexican film actress. She became a star during the Golden age of Mexican cinema.

== Early life ==
Roth was born as Martha Roth Pizzo in Padua, Italy to an Italian mother and a Hungarian Jewish father, Sándor Róth, a violinst. When Roth was seven years-old, she moved with her family moved to Mexico. There she studied music and received her first training in acting.

== Selected filmography ==
=== Film ===
- A Family Like Many Others (1949)
- Ventarrón (1949)
- Don't Love Me So Much (1949)
- The Lost City (1950)
- My Favourite (1950)
- A Gringo Girl in Mexico (1951)
- Engagement Ring (1951)
- Serenade in Acapulco (1951)
- Quiéreme porque me muero (1953)
- The Black Pirates (1954)
- Romance de fieras (1954)
- Massacre (1956)
- The White Renegade (1960)
- My Mexican Shivah (2007)

=== Television ===
- 2007 Destilando Amor – Doña Pilar Gil Vda. de Montalvo
- 2001 La intrusa – Norma Iturbide Vda. del Bosque
- 2001 El noveno mandamiento – Eugenia D'Anjou de Betancourt
- 1999 Mujeres engañadas – Doña Catalina Cortés Vda. de Duarte
- 1998 Gotita de amor – Dalila
- 1997 Mi pequeña traviesa – Elena
- 1990 En carne propia – Leda Dumont
- 1988 El pecado de Oyuki – Lady Elizabeth Pointer
- 1985 Los años pasan, Mercedes
- 1984 Eclipse – Amalia
- 1981 Nosotras las mujeres – Mónica
- 1973 Penthouse
- 1969 De turno con la angustia – Elena

== Bibliography ==
- R. Hernandez-Rodriguez. Splendors of Latin Cinema. ABC-CLIO, 2009.
