= Julián Soler =

Mexican actor and film director (1907–1977)

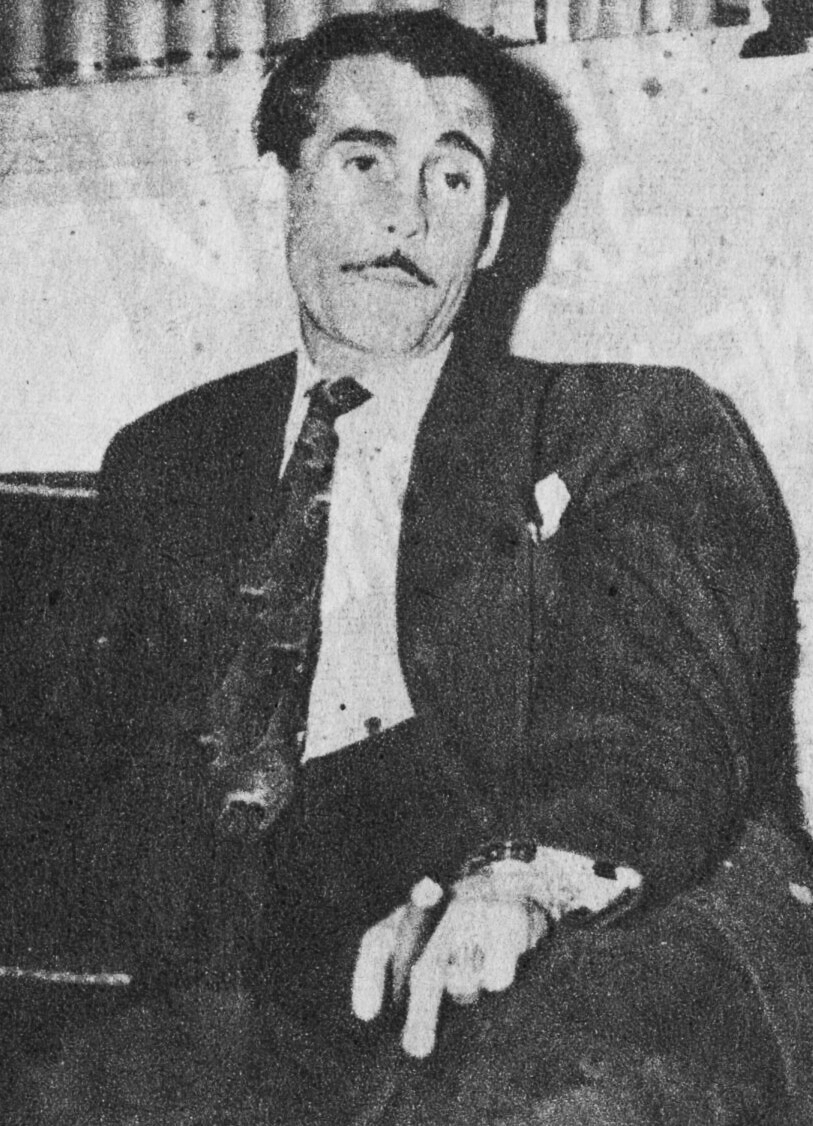
- Julián Soler in 1945
- Born: Julián Díaz Pavia; 17 February 1907; Ciudad Jiménez, Chihuahua, Mexico
- Died: 5 May 1977 (aged 70); Mexico City, Mexico
- Occupations: Film director actor screenwriter
- Years active: 1928–1977

Julián Díaz Pavia (17 February 1907 – 5 May 1977), better known by the stage name Julián Soler, was a Mexican film director, actor, and screenwriter of the Golden Age of Mexican cinema. In his career spanning half a century, Soler received two Ariel Award nominations.

== Early life ==
Julián Soler was born in Ciudad Jiménez, Chihuahua, as Julián Díaz Pavía on 17 February 1907 to Domingo Díaz García, a Galician actor, and Irene Pavía Soler, a Valencian actress. His parents were Spanish theater actors who had come to Mexico with a theatrical company. He was the elder brother of Mercedes Soler and the younger brother of Fernando Soler, Andrés Soler, and Domingo Soler. His family is known as the Soler Dynasty.

== Selected filmography ==
=== Actor ===
- Cruz Diablo (1934)
- Por mis pistolas (1938)
- The Coward (1939)
- Father's Entanglements (1939)
- The Whip (1939)
- Simón Bolívar (1942)
- Doña Bárbara (1943)
- Michael Strogoff (1944)
- The Two Orphans (1944)
- Amok (1945)
- He Who Died of Love (1945)
- Ecija's Seven Children (1947)
- The Secret of Juan Palomo (1947)
- Rostros olvidados (1952)

=== Director ===
- Aunt Candela (1948)
- A Galician in Mexico (1949)
- Orange Blossom for Your Wedding (1950)
- La miel se fue de la luna (1951)
- A Gringo Girl in Mexico (1951)
- The Three Happy Compadres (1952)
- Platillos Voladores
- A media luz los tres (1958)
- The Castle of the Monsters (1958)
- The Miracle Roses (1960)
- My Mother Is Guilty (1960)
- If I Were a Millionaire (1962)
- Casa de Mujeres (1966)
- El Jibarito Rafael (1969)
