= List of Mexican films of 1952 =

A list of the films produced in Mexico in 1952 (see 1952 in film):

== 1952 ==
Title	Director	Cast	Genre	Notes
1952
Acapulco	Emilio Fernández	Elsa Aguirre, Armando Calvo, Miguel Torruco	Comedy	
Angélica	Alfredo B. Crevenna	Irasema Dilián, Carlos Navarro, Ramón Gay,	Drama	
The Atomic Fireman	Miguel M. Delgado	Cantinflas, Miguel Manzano, Gilberto González	Comedy	
The Beautiful Dreamer	Gilberto Martínez Solares	Tin Tan, Lilia del Valle, Wolf Ruvinskis, Marcelo Chávez	Comedy	
The Border Man	Miguel M. Delgado	Alma Rosa Aguirre, Raúl Martínez, Andrés Soler	Comedy	
The Children of Maria Morales	Fernando de Fuentes	Pedro Infante, Antonio Badú, Emma Roldán	Comedy drama	
Chucho the Mended	Gilberto Martínez Solares	Tin-Tan, Alicia Caro, Perla Aguiar	Comedy	
Cuando los híjos pécan	Joselito Rodríguez	Meche Barba, Fernando Fernández, Silvia Pinal		
El Derecho de Nacer	Zacarías Gómez Urquiza	Gloria Marín, Jorge Mistral		
El Enamorado	Miguel Zacarías	Pedro Infante, Sara Montiel		
Forever Yours	Emilio Fernández	Jorge Negrete Gloria Marín, Tito Junco	Drama	
Forgotten Faces	Julio Bracho	Libertad Lamarque, Julián Soler, Alicia Caro	Drama	
Here Comes Martin Corona	Miguel Zacarías	Pedro Infante, Sara Montiel, Eulalio González	Comedy	
Hot Rhumba	Gilberto Martínez Solares	Adalberto Martínez, Lilia Prado, Óscar Pulido	Musical comedy	
I Don't Deny My Past	Alberto Gout	Ninón Sevilla, Roberto Cañedo, Luis Aldás	Drama	
If I Were a Congressman	Miguel M. Delgado	Cantinflas, Gloria Mange, Andrés Soler	Comedy	
Las interesadas	Rogelio A. González	Lilia del Valle, Lilia Prado, Amalia Aguilar		
The Justice of the Wolf	Vicente Oroná	Dagoberto Rodríguez, Flor Silvestre, Rosa de Castilla	Western	
The Lie	Juan José Ortega	Marga López, Jorge Mistral, Gina Cabrera	Drama	
The Lone Wolf	Vicente Oroná	Dagoberto Rodríguez, Flor Silvestre, Arturo Martínez	Western	
The Martyr of Calvary	Miguel Morayta	Enrique Rambal, Manolo Fábregas, Consuelo Frank	Drama	Entered into the 1954 Cannes Film Festival
Mexican Bus Ride	Luis Buñuel	Lilia Prado, Roberto Cobo, Manuel Dondé	Comedy	
The Minister's Daughter	Fernando Méndez	Luis Aguilar, Rosita Arenas, Víctor Parra	Comedy	
Mujer de medianoche	Victor Urruchua	Gloria Marín, Ernesto Alonso, Katy Jurado, Silvia Pinal		
My Adorable Savage	Jaime Salvador	Armando Calvo, Rita Macedo, Prudencia Grifell	Comedy	
My Wife and the Other One	Alfredo B. Crevenna	Arturo de Córdova, Marga López, Ramón Gay	Drama	
The Night Falls	Roberto Gavaldon	Pedro Armendariz, Anita Blanch, Rebeca Iturbide	Crime	
The Night Is Ours	Fernando A. Rivero	Jorge Mistral, Emilia Guiú, Ramón Gay	Drama	
Nobody's Children	Carlos Véjar	David Silva, Carmelita González, Dagoberto Rodríguez	Drama	
Now I Am Rich	Rogelio A. González	Pedro Infante, Marga López, Antonio Aguilar	Drama	
Paco the Elegant	Adolfo Fernández Bustamante	Antonio Badú, Emilia Guiú, Carlos Cores	Crime	
A Place Near Heaven	Rogelio A. González	Pedro Infante, Marga López, Silvia Pinal	Comedy drama	
Private Secretary	José Díaz Morales	Emilio Tuero, Alma Delia Fuentes, Carlos Martínez Baena	Drama	
Sister Alegría	Tito Davison	Rosita Quintana, Carmen Montejo, Andrea Palma	Comedy	
Snow White	Gilberto Martínez Solares	Tin-Tan, Alicia Caro, Andrés Soler	Comedy	
Soledad's Shawl	Roberto Gavaldón	Pedro Armendáriz, Arturo de Córdova, Stella Inda	Drama	
The Three Happy Compadres	Julián Soler	Pedro Armendáriz, Jorge Negrete, Andres Soler	Comedy	
The Three Happy Friends	Tito Davison	Lilia del Valle, Lilia Prado, Amalia Aguilar	Musical comedy	
The Trace of Some Lips	Juan Bustillo Oro	Rosario Granados, Carlos López Moctezuma, Rubén Rojo	Mystery thriller	
Tropical Delirium	Miguel Morayta	Amalia Aguilar, Víctor Alcocer, Beatriz Ramos	Musical drama	
Victims of Divorce	Fernando A. Rivero	Luis Aguilar, Esther Fernández, Emilia Guiú	Comedy drama	
When the Fog Lifts	Emilio Fernández	Columba Domínguez, Arturo de Córdova, María Elena Marqués	Mystery thriller	
The Wolf Returns	Vicente Oroná	Dagoberto Rodríguez, Flor Silvestre, Tito Novaro	Western	
A Woman Without Love	Luis Buñuel	Rosario Granados, Tito Junco	Drama	
The Woman You Want	Emilio Gómez Muriel	Irasema Dilián, Jorge Mistral, Eduardo Noriega	Drama	
Carne de presidio	Emilio Gómez Muriel	Pedro Armendáriz, Martha Roth, José María Linares-Rivas		
La miel se fue de la luna	Julián Soler	Abel Salazar, Alma Rosa Aguirre, Sara García, Julio Villarreal		
Las locuras de Tin-Tan	Gilberto Martínez Solares	Germán Valdés, Carmelita González, Marcelo Chávez		
Passionflower	Joaquín Pardavé	Meche Barba, Fernando Fernández, Freddy Fernández		
Sacrificed Women	Alberto Gout	Ninón Sevilla, Roberto Cañedo, Víctor Junco		
Un príncipe de la iglesia	Miguel M. Delgado	Carlos Orellana, Ernesto Alonso, Armando Arriola, José Baviera		
Viajera	Alfonso Patiño Gómez	Rosa Carmina, Fernando Fernández, Miguel Manzano		

== See also ==
- 1952 in Mexico
