= Vejar =

Vejar or Véjar may refer to:

== People ==
- Brayan Véjar (born 1995), Chilean footballer
- Carlos Véjar hijo (1906–1994), Mexican film director and screenwriter
- Mike Vejar (born 1943), American television director
- Sergio Véjar (1928–2009), Mexican cinematographer and screenwriter

== Places ==
- Vejar, Trebnje, a village in the Municipality of Trebnje, southeastern Slovenia
