= Northern Border (film) =

- Directed by: Vicente Oroná
- Written by: Raúl de Anda
- Produced by: Raúl de Anda
- Starring: Fernando Fernández; Evangelina Elizondo; Víctor Parra
- Cinematography: Ignacio Torres
- Edited by: Carlos Savage
- Production company: Cinematográfica Intercontinental
- Release date: 9 October 1953
- Running time: 85 minutes
- Country: Mexico
- Language: Spanish

Northern Border (Spanish: Frontera norte) is a 1953 Mexican crime film directed by Vicente Oroná and starring Fernando Fernández, Evangelina Elizondo, and Víctor Parra.

== Cast ==
- Fernando Fernández as Carlos Gómez
- Evangelina Elizondo as Rosaura
- Víctor Parra as El baby
- Dagoberto Rodríguez as Roberto Gómez
- Gloria Mestre as Gloria
- Arturo Martínez as Esbirro del baby
- Raúl de Anda Jr. as Cato
- Elisa Asperó as Sra. Gómez, madre de Carlos
- Antonio Bravo as Abogado
- Gilberto González as El Zurdo
- Jaime Fernández as Jimmy
- Federico Curiel as Detective policía
- Roberto G. Rivera as Teodoro
- Julio Sotelo as Comandante
- María Gentil Arcos as Madre Lolita
- Manuel Dondé
- Jorge Arriaga as Ronco
- Enrique del Castillo as Policía secreto
- Agustín de Anda as Bolero / policía secreto
- Lupe Carriles as Sirvienta en Tijuana
- Manuel Casanueva as Jefe Durán
- Arturo Cobo as Bailarín
- Enedina Díaz de León as Sirvienta
- Agustín Fernández as Esbirro del baby
- Jaime González Quiñones as Pablito
- Juan José Hurtado as Juan, contrabandista
- José L. Murillo as Leo García, agente 19
- José Muñoz as Comandante en Tijuana
- Roberto Y. Palacios as Wong Lee
