= The Genius (film) =

- Directed by: Miguel M. Delgado
- Written by: Jean Bernard-Luc; Alex Joffé; Íñigo de Martino; Jaime Salvador
- Produced by: Jacques Gelman; Santiago Reachi
- Starring: Mario Moreno «Cantinflas» Perla Aguiar; Aurora Walker; Carmen Novelty
- Cinematography: Raúl Martínez Solares
- Edited by: Jorge Bustos
- Music by: Gonzalo Curiel
- Production company: Posa Films
- Release date: 4 September 1948
- Country: Mexico
- Language: Spanish

The Genius (Spanish:El supersabio) is a 1948 Mexican comedy film directed by Miguel M. Delgado and starring Mario Moreno «Cantinflas», Perla Aguiar, Aurora Walker and Carmen Novelty. The film's sets were designed by the art director Gunther Gerszo.

== Plot ==
Cantinflas is an assistant to a leading scientist. He is pursued by a gang who wish to discover the secret formula for a cheaper fuel that his boss has allegedly discovered.

== Cast ==
- Mario Moreno as Cantinflas
- Perla Aguiar as Marisa Miranda
- Carlos Martínez Baena as Professor Archimedes Monteagudo
- Alejandro Cobo as Octavio
- Aurora Walker as Angélica Montes
- Alfredo Varela as Pepe Montes
- José Pidal as Doctor Inocencio Violante
- Eduardo Casado as Presidente de directorio petroleo
- Francisco Jambrina as Fiscal
- Pepe Martínez as Lic. Remigio Paredes
- Felipe Montoya as Señor Humberto Moya
- Rafael Icardo asAgustín Montes
- Carmen Novelty as Hija de Angélica Montes
- Armando Arriola as Ayudante de el Rosca
- Jorge Treviño as El Rosca
- José Ortiz de Zárate as Juez
- Julio Ahuet as Detective
- Julio Daneri as Miembro directivo petroleo
- Julián de Meriche as Italiano en directivo petroleo
- Lupe del Castillo as Portera
- Pedro Elviro as Empleado corte
- Edmundo Espino as Doctor
- Enrique García Álvarez as Señor director
- Leonor Gómez as Mujer en turba
- Miguel Manzano as Reportero
- Paco Martínez as Professor
- Héctor Mateos as Miembro directivo petroleo
- Kika Meyer as Espectadora corte
- José Muñoz as Plomero
- Manuel Noriega Ruiz as Professor
- Roberto Y. Palacios as Plomero
- José Pardavé as Fotógrafo
- Remigio Paredes as Invitado
- Luis Manuel Pelayo as Reportero
- Ignacio Peón as Miembro jurado
- Francisco Reiguera as Professor Peralta
- Humberto Rodríguez as Velador

== Bibliography ==
- Peter Standish & Steven M. Bell. Culture and Customs of Mexico. Greenwood Publishing Group, 2004.
