= The Player (1953 film) =

1953 film

- Directed by: Vicente Oroná
- Written by: Rubén A. Calderón; Vicente Oroná; Luis Enrique Vergara
- Produced by: Antonio R. Cabrera; Andrés Vergara; Luis Enrique Vergara
- Starring: David Silva; Carmelita González; Aurora Segura
- Cinematography: Manuel Gómez Urquiza
- Edited by: Charles L. Kimball
- Music by: Jorge Pérez
- Release date: 24 July 1953
- Running time: 89 minutes
- Country: Mexico
- Language: Spanish

The Player (Spanish: El jugador) is a 1953 Mexican crime film directed by Vicente Oroná and starring David Silva, Carmelita González and Aurora Segura.

== Cast ==
- David Silva as Alberto Maciel
- Carmelita González as Alicia Ramírez (Licha)
- Aurora Segura as Yolanda
- José María Linares-Rivas as Don Genaro
- Julio Villarreal as Don Gervasio, padre de Licha
- Dagoberto Rodríguez as Francisco Martínez
- Elisa Asperó as Doña Eduviges, madre de Licha
- Federico Curiel as Víctor, amigo de Alberto
- Queta Lavat as Hortensia, esposa de Francisco
- Fernando Wagner as Esposo de Yolanda
- Victorio Blanco as Empleado de Alberto
- Rodolfo Calvo as Asociado del produrador
- Alfonso Carti as Cantinero
- Jorge Chesterking as Jugador en casa de juego
- José Chávez as Amigo de Alberto
- Chayo García as Cantante
- Hilda Grey as Cantante
- Ana Bertha Lepe as Sofía, amiga de Licha
- Blanca Marroquín as Puestera
- Álvaro Matute as Hombre en casa de juego
- Irlanda Mora as Amiga de Licha
- Alfonso Morquecho
- Luis Mussot hijo as Eugenio
- Francisco Pando as Rosalio Hernández
- Pepe del Río as Agente de policía
- Salvador Terroba as Cliente de Alberto
- Acela Vidaurri as Amiga de Licha

== Bibliography ==
- María Luisa Amador. Cartelera cinematográfica, 1950-1959. UNAM, 1985.
