= De Anda =

de Anda or DeAnda is a Spanish surname. Notable people with the surname include:

- Alfonso de Anda (born 1974), Mexican television host
- Agustín de Anda (1933–1960), Mexican singer
- Carlos de Anda (1908–1995), Mexican sprinter
- Cuauhtémoc Anda Gutiérrez (born 1938), Mexican politician
- Francisco Gabriel de Anda (born 1971), Mexican footballer and sports analyst
- Francisco Javier Valdés de Anda (born 1956), Mexican politician
- Gilberto Gazcón de Anda (1929–2013), Mexican film director, screenwriter and producer
- James DeAnda (1925–2006), American judge
- Pablo de Anda Padilla (1830–1904), Mexican Catholic priest
- Paula DeAnda (born 1989), American singer
- Pedro de Anda (c. 1551–1619), Spanish conquistador
- Raúl de Anda (1908–1997), Mexican film director, screenwriter and film producer
- Rodolfo de Anda (1943–2010), Mexican actor
- Simón de Anda y Salazar (1709–1776), Spanish politician
- Tamara De Anda (born 1983), Mexican blogger and journalist
