= Veracruz Passion =

1950 film

- Directed by: Carlos Véjar hijo
- Written by: José Gutiérrez Zamora; Carlos Véjar hijo
- Produced by: Carlos Véjar hijo
- Starring: Víctor Manuel Mendoza; Irma Torres; Nora Veryán
- Cinematography: Ezequiel Carrasco
- Edited by: José Marino
- Distributed by: Clasa-Mohme
- Release date: 14 May 1950
- Running time: 88 minutes
- Country: Mexico
- Language: Spanish

Veracruz Passion (Spanish: Pasión jarocha) is a 1950 Mexican musical drama film directed by Carlos Véjar hijo and starring Víctor Manuel Mendoza, Irma Torres and Nora Veryán. The film's sets were designed by the art director José Rodríguez Granada. The plot revolves around the conflict between two Veracruz towns over labour disputes in the sugar cane fields.

== Cast ==
- Víctor Manuel Mendoza as Omar
- Irma Torres as Rosalinda
- Rafael Lanzetta as Hugo
- Bertha Lomelí as Cándida
- Nora Veryán as Ana Julia Orozco
- Salvador Quiroz as Don Esteban
- María Gentil Arcos as Mamá de Hugo
- Edmundo Espino as Don José
- Rogelio Fernández as Hilario
- Esteban Mayo as Toño
- Agustín Fernández as Macario
- Lupe Carriles as Mujer de Andrés

== Bibliography ==
- Navitski, Rielle & Poppe, Nicolas (ed.) Cosmopolitan Film Cultures in Latin America, 1896–1960. Indiana University Press, 2017.
- Riera, Emilio García. Historia documental del cine mexicano: 1949-1950. Universidad de Guadalajara, 1992
