= Malditas sean las mujeres =

- Written by: Juan Bustillo Oro, Antonio Helu
- Starring: Adriana Lamar; Sara García
- Release date: 1936
- Country: Mexico
- Language: Spanish

Malditas sean las mujeres, also known as Malditas serán las mujeres ("Cursed be the Women") is a 1936 Mexican film. It stars Adriana Lamar.

== Cast ==
- Adriana Lamar - Julia de Ambrosaliet
- Ramón Pereda - Alejandro del Valle
- Polo Ortín - Francisco, criado
- Manuel Noriega - Señor de Velasco
- René Cardona - Conde Osvaldo de Valdemar
- Juan José Martínez Casado - Gilberto de Velasco
- Sara García - Señora de Ambrosaliet
- Miguel Arenas - Ernesto
- Joaquín Coss - Director de escuela
- Miguel Wimer - Losange
- Dolores Camarillo - María, sirvienta
- Paco Martínez - Señor de Ambrosaliet
- Pepe Martínez - Secretario
