= Road of Hell (1951 film) =

- Directed by: Miguel Morayta
- Written by: Miguel Morayta; Luis Spota
- Produced by: Óscar J. Brooks; Felipe Mier
- Starring: Pedro Armendáriz; Leticia Palma; Wolf Ruvinskis
- Cinematography: Ignacio Torres
- Edited by: José W. Bustos
- Music by: Luis Hernández Bretón
- Production company: Mier y Brooks
- Release date: 29 June 1951
- Running time: 90 minutes
- Country: Mexico
- Language: Spanish

Road of Hell (Spanish: Camino del infierno) is a 1951 Mexican thriller film directed by Miguel Morayta and starring Pedro Armendáriz, Leticia Palma and Wolf Ruvinskis.

The film's art direction was by Gunther Gerszo.

== Cast ==
- Pedro Armendáriz as Pedro Uribe
- Leticia Palma as Leticia
- Wolf Ruvinskis as Tony
- Ramón Gay as León
- Arturo Soto Rangel as Dr. Fausto
- Manuel Calvo as El Chueco
- Lupe Inclán as Doña Chole
- Dora María as Cantante
- Armando Velasco as Don Fermín
- Pascual García Peña as Bruno Landeros, esbirro de Pedro
- Ignacio Villalbazo
- Guillermo Samperio as Detective de policía
- Fernando Galiana as Taquillero en cine
- Edmundo Espino as Jefe de detectives
- José Chávez as Joselito, esbirro de Pedro
- Francisco Pando as Juanito, cantinero
- Julio Daneri as Cantinero
- Kika Meyer as Mujer de la calle
- Joaquín Roche as Empleado cabaret

== Bibliography ==
- Rogelio Agrasánchez. Carteles de la época de oro del cine mexicano. Archivo Fílmico Agrasánchez, 1997.
