= Wolf Ruvinskis =

Mexican actor and professional wrestler

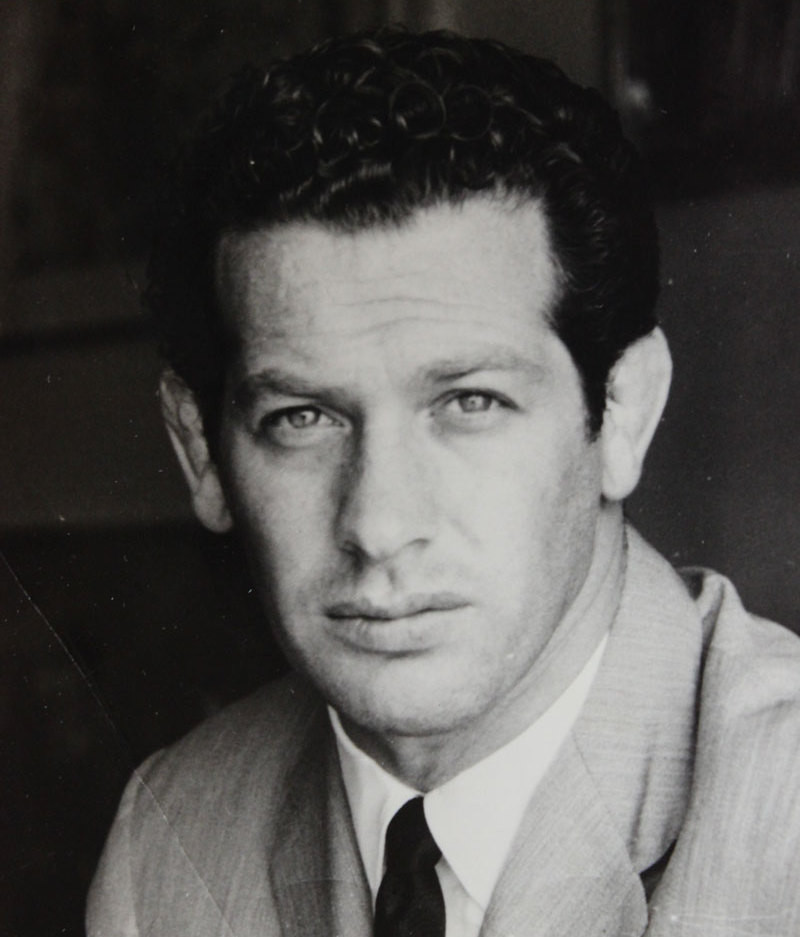
- Ruvinskis, c. 1950s

Personal information
- Born: Wolf Ruvinskis Manevics; October 31, 1921 Riga, Latvia
- Died: November 9, 1999 (aged 78) Mexico City, Mexico

Professional wrestling career
- Ring name(s): Wolf Ruvinskis; Neutrón; Wolf Rubinsky; Wolf Rubinski
- Billed height: 1.65 m (5 ft 5 in)
- Billed weight: 80 kg (176 lb)

Wolf Ruvinskis (October 31, 1921 – November 9, 1999), born Wolf Ruvinskis Manevics, was a Latvian-Mexican actor and professional wrestler. He was married to dancer Armida Herrera. Born to a Latvian mother and a Ukrainian father, of Jewish background, they relocated to Argentina in 1923. In spite of living in extreme poverty he excelled in sports and as a professional wrestler he toured South America, the United States and Mexico. This last country became his place of residence where he stayed in the ring well into the 1960s, wrestling El Santo, Black Shadow, El Médico Asesino and Lobo Negro. As a professional wrestler he was introduced to the Cinema of Mexico playing professional wrestlers, in particular a masked character he created called Neutrón. He also belongs to the Golden Age of Mexican cinema.

== Biography ==
Ruvinskis was born on October 31, 1921 in Riga, Latvia. His parents emigrated to Argentina in 1923. The Ruvinskis family lived in poverty in Argentina, forcing a very young Wolf Ruvinskis to begin wrestling professionally as a way to help provide for his family.

=== Professional wrestling career ===
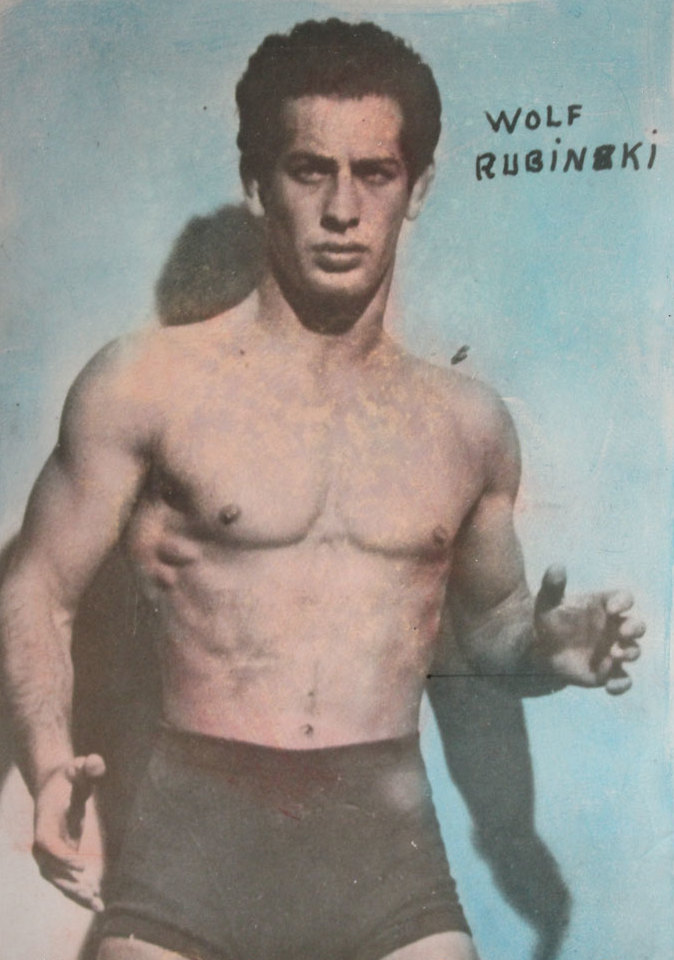
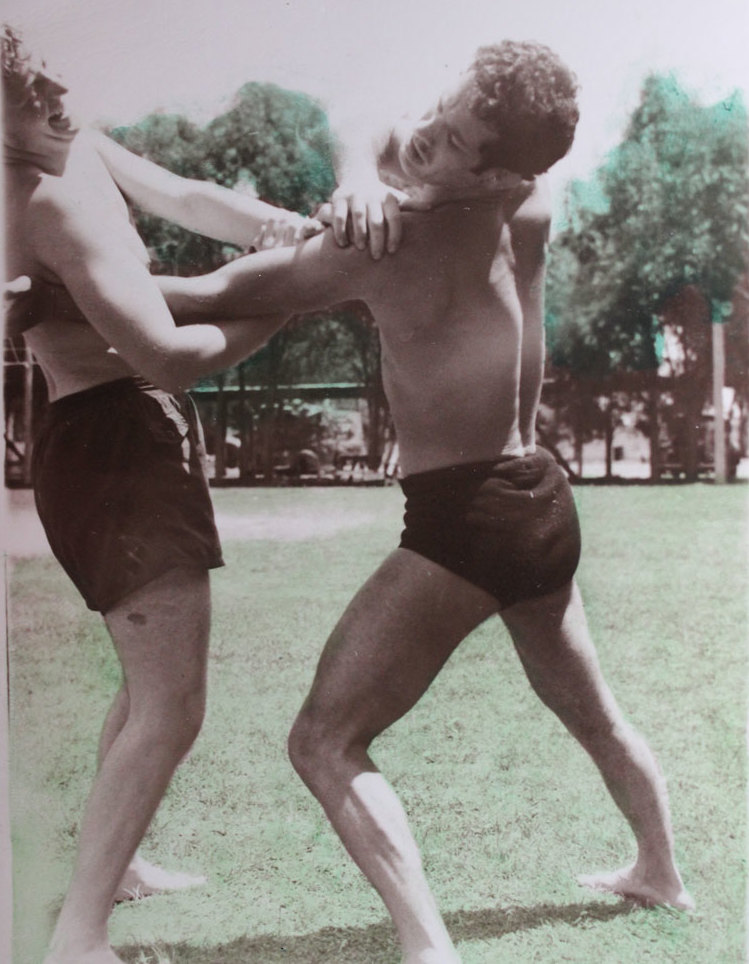
Ruvinskis in a publicity photo as wrestler (left) and during a match/training (right), c. 1940s

Ruvinskis quickly became a proficient Rudo (bad guy) in wrestling, which led him to be booked on tours of South America and later on both Mexico and the United States. When he came to Mexico he was originally slated for a short tour of the country before moving on, but he fell in love with the country and settled there soon after. He also met and married a Mexican woman and started a family. In the ring he played a savage, vicious Rudo character which was very successful and manage to draw large crowds wherever he went as everyone wanted the local top tecnico ("good guy") to defeat the savage El Lobo Letonia ("The Latvian Wolf"). His promising wrestling career was cut short around 1950 when accumulated injuries forced him to stop wrestling.

=== Acting career ===
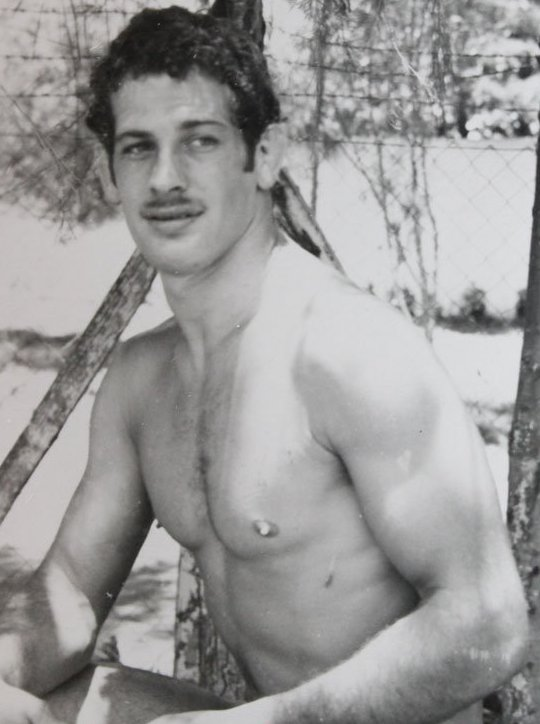
Ruvinskis, c. 1940s

After his retirement Ruvinskis focused on his second passion, acting. He had already played smaller parts in movies before retirement but after he retired he went into the acting business full-time. One of his most memorable roles was in the movie La bestia magnífica ("The Magnificent Beast") from 1953. With his background in wrestling it was only a matter of time before he became involved in the Mexican Lucha film genre. He played the lead role in the 1956 cult classic El Ladron de Cadaveres, which is now considered the first true Mexican Wrestling/ Horror film. Ruviniskis also played the part of a masked wrestling character/ superhero called Neutrón in a series of movies between 1960 and 1964. His acting career ended in 1996 (at age 74) with the movie La mujer de los dos ("The Woman for the Two"). In recent years Lucha movies have been shown regularly on Mexican television leading to a bit of a revival of Wolf Ruvinskis' memory, reminding fans that Ruviniski was both a great wrestler and a great actor. For some reason, he is credited variously in reference books and in film credits as "Wolf Ruvinskis", "Wolf Ruvinski", "Wolf Rubinski" or "Wolf Rubinskis".

=== Late life ===
After he stopped acting Ruvinskis opened a restaurant and became a very hands-on, passionate restaurateur who oversaw a couple of Argentinian restaurants in Mexico City named "El Rincón Gaucho". While he played a hated villain in wrestling his real persona was a complete opposite, described as a gentleman who lived to entertain diners with conversation and jokes, or at times even an Argentinian Tango. Wolf Ruviniskis died on November 9, 1999, in Mexico City. He was 78.

== Acting Awards ==
- Ariel Award by the Mexican Academy of Film

- Best supporting actor for Juego limpio (1996)

== Filmography ==
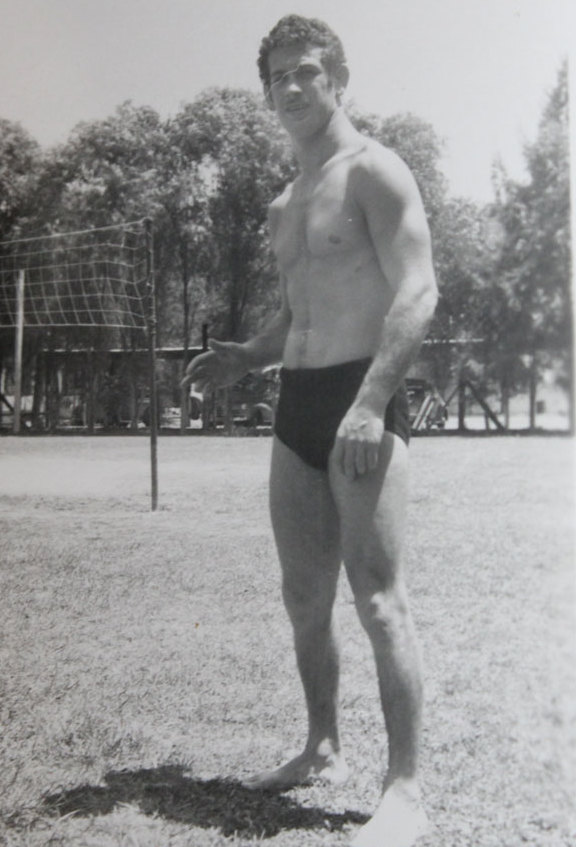
Ruvinskis, c. 1940s

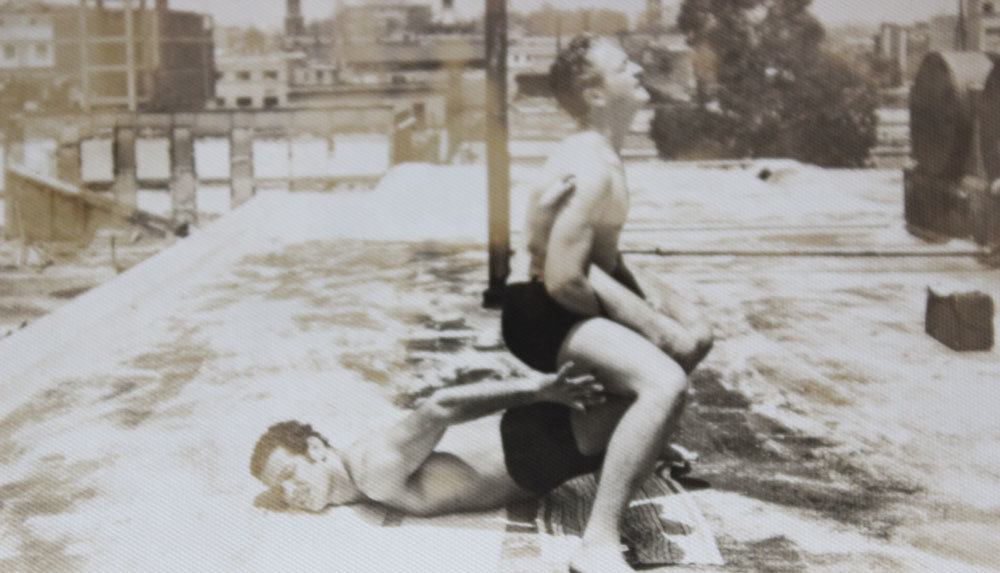
Ruvinskis (on the floor) during what it looks to be a wrestling training/match, c. 1940s

=== As a producer ===
- La última lucha (1959)

=== As an actor ===
- La mujer de los dos (1996)
- Juego limpio (1996)
- Un Ángel para los Diablillos (1993)
- Días de combate (1987)
- Rosa de dos aromas (1989)
- La Mafia tiembla (1987)
- The Kidnapping of Lola (1986)
- La fuga de Carrasco (1983)
- Nocaut (1983) – as don Saúl
- El Patrullero 777 (1977)
- El Mexicano (1976) – as lieutenant José Alvarado
- El Hombre del puente (1975) – as the military dictator
- Acapulco 12-22 (1971) – as Claude, yacht captain
- El crepúsculo de un dios (1968) – as Charles González
- Esclava del deseo (1967) – as Bronco
- Santo, el Enmascarado de Plata vs. los villanos del ring / Santo vs the Villains of the Ring (1966) – as Rodolfo Labra
- Santo, el Enmascarado de Plata vs. la invasión de los marcianos / Santo vs the Martian Invasion (1966) – as Argos
- Cargamento prohibido (1965) – as Carlos Aguilar
- El señor doctor (1965) – as Beto's father
- Jinetes de la llanura (1964) – as Andrés Menchaca
- Neutrón Movie series as Neutrón

- Neutrón contra los asesinos del karate / Neutron vs the Karate Killers (1965)
- Neutrón contra el criminal sádico / Neutron vs the Maniac (1964)
- Neutrón contra el doctor Caronte / Neutron vs the Amazing Dr. Caronte (1960)
- Los autómatas de la muerte / Neutron vs the Death Robots (1960)
- Neutrón el Enmascarado Negro / Neutron, the Man in the Black Mask (1960)

- El Rapto de las Sabinas (1960) – as Rómulo
- Las canciones unidas (1960) – as soviet delegate
- Vivo o muerto (1959) – as Crisanto Medina
- La estrella vacía (1958) – as Tomás Téllez
- La última lucha / The Last Fight (1958) – as Lobo
- Los Tigres del Ring series / Tigers of the Ring (1957) – as Mario or Rafael

- El torneo de la muerte
- Furias desatadas
- Secuestro diabólico
- Los tigres del ring

- El superflaco (1957) – as Rudy
- Paso a la juventud (1957) – as Rodolfo
- A media luz los tres (1957) – as Sebastián Reyes
- Asesinos, S.A. (1957)
- Ladrón de cadáveres / The Body Snatcher (1956) – as Guillermo Santana (one of the earliest Mexican / Wrestling horror films)
- Los tres mosqueteros... y medio (1956) – as Aramís
- Puss Without Boots (1957) – as Humberto Carrasco
- The Medallion Crime (1956) – as Ramón Torres
- El túnel seis (1955) – as Ricardo Álvarez
- Los Gavilanes (1954) – as Rómulo
- Barefoot Sultan (1954) – as Hilario Trujeque
- La vida no vale nada (1954) – as El Caimán
- Caballero a la Medida (1954) – as Chucho el Sacristán
- La gitana blanca (1954) – as Yaco
- ¿Por qué ya no me quieres? (1953) – as the gangster
- A Tailored Gentleman (1953) – as Chucho
- Reportaje (1953) – as policeman
- La sexta carrera (1953) – as horseracer
- The Magnificent Beast (1953)
- The Vagabond (1953) – as Hércules
- Pepe el Toro (1952) – as Bobby Galeana
- El plebeyo (1952) – as Lobo
- You've Got Me By the Wing (1953) – as Mayordomo
- The Photographer (1953) – as Esbirro principal
- When the Fog Lifts (1952) – as sick man
- The Three Happy Compadres (1952) – as Diana's lover
- The Three Happy Friends (1952) – as Tranquilino
- Las locuras de Tin-Tan (1952)
- The Beautiful Dreamer (1952) / The Sleeping Beauty (1952) – as Tracatá/doctor Heinrich Wolf
- El Bello Durmiento (1952)
- La bestia magnífica / The Magnificent Beast (1952) – as Carlos (one of the earliest Mexican wrestling films)
- Las locuras de Tin Tan (1951) – as crazy strong guy
- La noche avanza (1951) – as Bodoques
- Women Without Tomorrow (1951) – as Juan
- El revoltoso (1951) – as Roberto
- Trotacalles (1951) – as Carlos
- Camino del infierno (1950) – as Tony
- Sinbad the Seasick (1950) – as Mary's boyfriend
- The Man Without a Face (1950) – as monstruo
- Amor salvaje (1949) – as marinero
- The Black Sheep (1949) – as the boxer El Campeón Asesino
- Hipócrita (film) (1949) – as El Rayas
- No me defiendas, compadre (1949) – as the wrestler El Enmascarado

== Television roles ==
- I Spy (March 4, 1968, episode #321 Shana) as Andreyev
