= Opium (1949 film) =

- Directed by: Ramón Peón
- Written by: Ramón Peón
- Cinematography: Gabriel Figueroa
- Edited by: Gloria Schoemann
- Music by: Gonzalo Curiel
- Production company: Maya Films
- Release date: 4 June 1949
- Country: Mexico
- Language: Spanish

Opium (Spanish: Opio) is a 1949 Mexican crime film directed by Ramón Peón.

The film's sets were designed by Ramón Rodríguez Granada.

== Cast ==
- Carolina Barret
- Chela Castro]
- Tito Junco
- Héctor Mateos
- Gelacio Ponce
- Juan Pulido
- Rosita Quintana
- Titina Romay
- Fanny Schiller
- Domingo Soler
- Eduardo Vivas
- Mazando Yamada

== Bibliography ==
- Rogelio Agrasánchez. Carteles de la época de oro del cine mexicano. Archivo Fílmico Agrasánchez, 1997.
