= Adriana Lamar =

Mexican actress (1909–1946)

- Born: Amparo Gutiérrez Hernández; 9 May 1908; Celaya, Guanajuato, Mexico
- Died: 30 January 1946 (aged 37); Mexico City, Mexico
- Other name: Monina Lamar
- Occupation: Actress
- Years active: 1933–1946 (film)
- Spouse: Ramón Pereda

Adriana Lamar (born Amparo Gutiérrez Hernández; 9 May 1908 (Note: Her birth date is unclear. Most sources give 1908; others range from 1906 to 1909; while the claim that she died in January 1946 at the age of 38 would indicate 1907 or early 1908.) – 30 January 1946) was a Mexican film actress active during the Golden Age of Mexican Cinema. Known by the pet name Monina, in her early work she was sometimes credited as Monina Lamar.

Born in Celaya, Guanajuato, Lamar appeared in 35 films, including 1933's La Llorona, Mexico's first horror film with sound. In the 1930s, she also performed at Teatro Colón in El Paso, Texas, demonstrating how love and fight scenes were filmed.

She was married to the actor Ramón Pereda, with whom she co-starred in several films and who directed her in others. In 1946, during the filming of Ramón Peón's Rocambole, she underwent emergency surgery and died on 30 January at the age of 38. She was buried in Mexico City's Panteón Español.

In 2023, alongside Diego Rivera, José Alfredo Jiménez and María Grever, Lamar was portrayed on the tickets for issue No. 2790 of the National Lottery's Sorteo Superior draw, commemorating prominent artistic figures from the state of Guanajuato on the occasion of its 200th anniversary.

== Selected filmography ==
- Cheri-Bibi (1931, directed by Carlos F. Borcosque)
- Sanctuary (1933, directed by Ramón Peón)
- La Llorona (1933, directed by Ramón Peón)
- El vuelo de la muerte (1934, directed by Guillermo Calles)
- Chucho el Roto (1934, directed by Gabriel Soria)
- No matarás (1935, directed by Miguel Contreras Torres)
- Women of Today (1936, directed by Ramón Peón)
- Irma la mala (1936, directed by Raphael J. Sevilla)
- Malditas sean las mujeres (1936, directed by Juan Bustillo Oro)
- These Men (1937, directed by Rolando Aguilar)
- Beautiful Mexico (1938, directed by Ramón Pereda)
- I Will Live Again (1940, directed by Roberto Rodríguez)
- Jesus of Nazareth (1942, directed by José Díaz Morales), as Mary Magdalene
- Arsène Lupin (1947, directed by Ramón Peón)
- You Have the Eyes of a Deadly Woman (1947, directed by Ramón Peón)

== Bibliography ==
- Lisa Jarvinen. The Rise of Spanish-Language Filmmaking: Out from Hollywood's Shadow, 1929–1939. Rutgers University Press, 2012.
