= Northern Border =

Northern Border or North Border may refer to:

- Mexico–United States border, the international border between Mexico and the United States
- Canada–United States border, the international border between Canada and the United States
- Northern Border (film), a 1953 Mexican crime film
