= Leticia Palma =

Mexican actress

- Born: Zoyla Gloria Ruiz Moscoso; December 23, 1926; Paraíso, Tabasco, Mexico
- Died: December 4, 2009 (aged 82); Mexico City, México
- Occupation: Actress
- Years active: 1946–1954

Zoyla Gloria Ruiz Moscoso (December 23, 1926 – December 4, 2009), better known by her stage name Leticia Palma, was an actress who worked in Mexican cinema. She was most famous for her role in Roberto Gavaldón's En la palma de tu mano, which ranked 70th on Somos magazine's 1994 list of the 100 best Mexican films.

== Biography ==
Born in Paraíso, Tabasco, Palma starred in a dozen films and was married to a wealthy American. A dispute with actor-singer Jorge Negrete, then president of the National Association of Actors (ANDA), led to her being banned from the Mexican film industry.

According to Palma, she and Negrete were nearly involved in a traffic accident on the Paseo de la Reforma in the summer of 1952. Negrete claimed that he was not involved and that he just happened to be nearby at the time. When Palma talked to the press afterwards, not only did she comment on Negrete's driving, but she also took advantage of the opportunity to accuse Negrete of using his influence in the union to attempt to sabotage her career.

Negrete argued that union sanctions were placed due to her stealing her own contract files from the offices of ANDA. Palma campaigned actively for Mario Moreno "Cantinflas" in the struggle between him and Negrete over leadership of the union.

On January 10, 1953, ANDA held a special assembly to judge Palma. Cantinflas argued on her behalf, attempting to negotiate a settlement. Palma could never prove her accusations against Negrete, and the majority of ANDA members voted in favor of her expulsion, thus ending her career.

Cinema historian Emilio García Riera described her as "one of the most interesting presences" on the Mexican silver screen. She died on December 4, 2009, in Cuernavaca, México.

== Filmography ==
- Apasionada (1952)
- Por qué peca la mujer (1951)
- Women Without Tomorrow (1951)
- In the Palm of Your Hand (1951)
- Road of Hell (1950)
- También de dolor se canta (1950) (as herself)
- Vagabunda (1950)
- Cuatro contra el mundo (1949)
- Hipócrita..! (1949) (credited as Nazira or Nacira de Tello)
- Escuela para casadas (1949) (credited as Nazira or Nacira de Tello)
- El hombre de la máscara de hierro (1943)
- I Danced with Don Porfirio (1942)
