= She, Lucifer and I =

1953 film by Miguel Morayta

- Directed by: Miguel Morayta
- Written by: Alberto Insúa (novel); Miguel Morayta
- Produced by: Modesto Pascó; Emilio Tuero
- Starring: Sara Montiel; Abel Salazar; Carlos López Moctezuma
- Cinematography: Ezequiel Carrasco
- Edited by: Fernando Martínez
- Production company: Argel Films
- Release date: 18 March 1953
- Running time: 90 minutes
- Country: Mexico
- Language: Spanish

She, Lucifer and I (Spanish: Ella, Lucifer y yo) is a 1953 Mexican comedy film directed by Miguel Morayta and starring Sara Montiel, Abel Salazar and Carlos López Moctezuma.

== Cast ==
- Sara Montiel as Isabel
- Abel Salazar as Jorge
- Carlos López Moctezuma as Lucifer / Productor
- Dalia Íñiguez as Matilde
- Nono Arsu as himself
- Luis Manuel Pelayo as Agente
- Luis Aragón
- Roberto Spriu
- Lidia Franco
- María Herrero
- Ángel Merino as Eusebio
- Trío Calaveras as Themselves

== Bibliography ==
- Pierce, David. Motion Picture Copyrights & Renewals, 1950-1959. Milestone, 1989.
