= Black Skull (film) =

1960 film

- Directed by: Joselito Rodríguez
- Starring: Luis Aguilar; Dagoberto Rodríguez; Pascual García Peña
- Production company: Producciones Universal
- Release date: 14 December 1960
- Running time: 87 minutes
- Country: Mexico
- Language: Spanish

Black Skull (Spanish: La calavera negra) is a 1960 Mexican western film directed by Joselito Rodríguez and starring Luis Aguilar, Dagoberto Rodríguez and Pascual García Peña.

== Cast ==
- Luis Aguilar as El Ranchero Solitario
- Dagoberto Rodríguez as Manuel Noriega López
- Pascual García Peña as Comisario
- José Eduardo Pérez as Remigio García
- Esperanza Issa as Médica
- Irma Castillón as Hija de Manuel
- Fanny Schiller as Esposa de Remigio
- Emma Roldán as Hermana de Remigio
- Enrique Zambrano
- José Luis Rojas
- Vicente Lara
- Ramón Bugarini as Ayudante de Comisario

== Bibliography ==
- Emilio García Riera. Historia documental del cine mexicano: 1959-1960. Universidad de Guadalajara, 1994.
