= Sanctuary (1933 film) =

1933 film by Ramón Peón

- Directed by: Ramón Peón
- Written by: Carlos L. Cabello; Quirico Michelena
- Produced by: Gabriel Flores; Guillermo Tardiff
- Starring: Ramón Pereda; Adriana Lamar; Julio Villarreal
- Cinematography: Alex Phillips
- Edited by: Ramón Peón
- Music by: Manuel Sereijo; Max Urban
- Production company: Aspa Films
- Distributed by: Películas Mexicanas
- Release date: 28 September 1933
- Running time: 71 minutes
- Country: Mexico
- Language: Spanish

Sanctuary (Spanish:Sagrario) is a 1933 Mexican drama film directed by Ramón Peón and starring Ramón Pereda, Adriana Lamar and Julio Villarreal.

== Cast ==
- Ramón Pereda as Dr. Horacio Rueda
- Adriana Lamar as Elena Rivero
- Julio Villarreal as Juan Rivero
- María Luisa Zea as Sagrario Rivero
- Luis G. Barreiro as Dr. Gutiérrez
- Juan Orol as Carmelo
- Consuelo Moreno as Concha
- Pili Castellanos as Sagrario, niña
- María Valdealde as Doña Lupe
- Jesús Melgarejo as Don Chencho
- María Luisa Armit as Criada
- Francisco Lugo as Arturo
- Fabián Villar as Detective
- Carlos L. Cabello as Preso

== Bibliography ==
- Daniel Balderston, Mike Gonzalez & Ana M. Lopez. Encyclopedia of Contemporary Latin American and Caribbean Cultures. Routledge, 2002.
