= Dalia Íñiguez =

Cuban actress

- Born: 1 May 1901; Havana, Cuba
- Died: 4 October 1995 (aged 94); Mexico City, Mexico
- Occupation: Actress
- Years active: 1946–1965 (film & TV)

Dalia Íñiguez (1901–1995) was a Cuban film and television actress. She appeared in a number of films during the Golden Age of Mexican Cinema, later appearing largely in telenovelas. She was married to the actors Rafael Bertrand and Juan Pulido.

== Selected filmography ==
- El puente del castigo (1946)
- El ropavejero (1949)
- The Fallen Angel (1949)
- The Black Sheep (1949)
- Zorina (1949)
- The Devil Is a Woman (1950)
- My Goddaughter's Difficulties (1951)
- My Husband (1951)
- Nobody's Children (1952)
- My Adorable Savage (1952)
- Marejada (1952)
- The Strange Passenger (1953)
- She, Lucifer and I (1953)
- The White Rose (1954)
- ...Y mañana serán mujeres (1955)
- Corazón salvaje (1956)
- Los Cuervos están de luto (1965)

== Bibliography ==
- Cuadriello, Jorge Domingo. Una mirada a la vida intelectual cubana: (1940-1950). Editorial Renacimiento, 2014.
- Garcia, Rupert. Posters from the Golden Age of Mexican Cinema. Galeria de la Raza/Studio 24, 1979.
- Irwin, Robert & Ricalde, Maricruz. Global Mexican Cinema: Its Golden Age. British Film Institute, 2013.
