= Vicente Oroná =

Uruguayan film director

- Born: 27 September 1904; Dolores, Uruguay
- Occupations: Actor, screenwriter, director
- Years active: 1924–1968 (film)

Vicente Oroná (born 1904) was a Uruguayan actor, screenwriter and film director. He was active during the Golden Age of Mexican Cinema. In 1952 he directed a trilogy of films featuring Dagoberto Rodríguez as The Wolf.

== Selected filmography ==
- I Will Live Again (1940)
- Chachita from Triana (1947)
- Tierra muerta (1949)
- The Lone Wolf (1952)
- The Justice of the Wolf (1952)
- The Wolf Returns (1952)
- The Player (1953)
- Northern Border (1953)
- El jinete (1954)
- La sombra de Cruz Diablo (1955)
- El tesoro de Isla de Pinos (1956)

== Bibliography ==
- Poppe, Nicolas. Alton's Paradox: Foreign Film Workers and the Emergence of Industrial Cinema in Latin America. State University of New York Press, 2021.
- Riera, Emilio García. Breve historia del cine mexicano: primer siglo, 1897–1997. Instituto Mexicano de Cinematografía, 1998.
- Wilt, David E. The Mexican Filmography, 1916 through 2001. McFarland, 2024.
