= Women of Today (film) =

- Directed by: Ramón Peón
- Produced by: E. Hidalgo Álvarez
- Starring: Adriana Lamar; Ramón Pereda; Victoria Blanco; Carlos López y Valles
- Production company: La Mexicana
- Release date: 15 October 1936
- Running time: 75 minutes
- Country: Mexico
- Language: Spanish

Women of Today (Spanish: Mujeres de hoy) is a 1936 Mexican comedy drama film directed by Ramón Peón and starring Adriana Lamar, Ramón Pereda and Victoria Blanco.

== Cast ==
- Adriana Lamar as Amparo Balboa
- Ramón Pereda as Licenciado Eloy Pineda
- Victoria Blanco as Margot Delgado
- Juan José Martínez Casado as Alfonso
- Adria Delhort as Chabela Nizán
- Emma Roldán as Doña Adelaida
- Joaquín Coss as Don Plútarco
- Paco Martínez as Don Otilio
- Carmen Hermosillo as Lupe Zapico
- Paulina Azcoitia as Crispina, sirvienta
- Mimí Derba as Doña Elvira
- José Eduardo Pérez as Federico Plat
- Rodolfo Calvo as Fernando Mendoza
- Carlos Aganza as Ramoncito Beltrán
- Carmen Vale
- Lolita Téllez Wood as Bailarina
- Carlos López as Policía

== Bibliography ==
- Alfred Charles Richard. Censorship and Hollywood's Hispanic image: an interpretive filmography, 1936-1955. Greenwood Press, 1993.
