= Hudeje =

- Location in Slovenia
- Coordinates: 45°56′6.11″N 15°1′12.39″E
- Country: Slovenia
- Traditional region: Lower Carniola
- Statistical region: Southeast Slovenia
- Municipality: Trebnje

Area
  - Total: 1.7 km^{2} (0.66 sq mi)
- Elevation: 288.5 m (947 ft)

Population (2015)
  - Total: 72

Hudeje (pronounced [xuˈdɛːjɛ] or [xuˈdeːjɛ]) is a settlement north of Trebnje in eastern Slovenia. Historically the area was part of Lower Carniola and the entire Municipality of Trebnje is now included in the Southeast Slovenia Statistical Region.

== History ==
In 2014, Vejar (formerly the hamlet of V blatih) was administratively separated from the village and made a separate settlement.
