= ¡Paso a la juventud..! =

- Directed by: Gilberto Martínez Solares
- Written by: Gilberto Martínez Solares
- Produced by: Fernando de Fuentes
- Release date: 1958
- Country: Mexico
- Language: Spanish

¡Paso a la juventud..! ("Pass to the Youth") is a 1958 Mexican comedy film written and directed by Gilberto Martínez Solares and starring Germán Valdés "Tin-Tan", Ana Bertha Lepe and Erna Martha Bauman. The film marked the film debut of Joaquín Capilla and also features of which there is a special participation of Flor Silvestre, Maricarmen Vela, Lilia Guízar, Elsa Cárdenas, Lucy González and Virma González.
