= Hypocrite (film) =

1949 film

Hipócrita
- Directed by: Miguel Morayta
- Written by: Miguel Morayta; Luis Spota
- Produced by: Óscar J. Brooks
- Starring: Antonio Badú; Leticia Palma; Carmen Molina; Luis Beristáin
- Cinematography: Víctor Herrera
- Edited by: José W. Bustos
- Music by: Luis Hernández Bretón
- Release date: 12 October 1949
- Country: Mexico
- Language: Spanish

Hypocrite (Spanish: Hipócrita..!) is a 1949 Mexican thriller film directed by Miguel Morayta and starring Antonio Badú, Leticia Palma, Carmen Molina and Luis Beristáin. The film included the song "Hipócrita". The film's sets were designed by the art director Francisco Marco Chillet.

== Cast ==
- Antonio Badú as Pepe el sabroso
- Leticia Palma as Leticia
- Carmen Molina as Aurora
- Luis Beristáin as Gerardo
- Pascual García Peña as Ricardito
- Elda Peralta as Vendedora de cigarros
- Francisco Reiguera as Don Simón
- Wolf Ruvinskis as El rayas
- Julián de Meriche as El soplón
- Edmundo Espino as Juanito
- Ricardo Adalid as Doctor
- León Barroso as Policía
- José Chávez as Preso
- Felipe de Flores as Anunciador
- Alfonso Díaz Landa
- Emilio Garibay as Leandro
- Ramón Gay as El ronco
- María Gentil Arcos as Mamá de Aurora
- Leonor Gómez as Presa
- Los Panchos as Cantantes
- Joaquín Roche as El Argentino, papá de Leticia
- Hernán Vera as Mesero

== Bibliography ==
- Rogelio Agrasánchez. Carteles de la época de oro del cine mexicano. Archivo Fílmico Agrasánchez, 1997.
