= Beautiful Mexico =

- Directed by: Ramón Pereda
- Written by: Ramón Pereda; Ramón Pérez Peláez
- Produced by: Ramón Pereda
- Starring: Adriana Lamar; Ramón Pereda; Antonio R. Frausto
- Cinematography: Agustín Martínez Solares; Gilberto Martínez Solares
- Edited by: Mario de Lara; Juan José Marino
- Music by: Tomás Ponce Reyes
- Production company: Pereda Films
- Release date: 29 September 1938
- Running time: 90 minutes
- Country: Mexico
- Language: Spanish

Beautiful Mexico (Spanish:México lindo) is a 1938 Mexican musical film directed and co-written by Ramón Pereda and starring Pereda, Adriana Lamar and Antonio R. Frausto. This film marked the acting debut of Fernando Soto "Mantequilla".

The film's sets were designed by the art director Fernando A. Rivero.

== Cast ==
- Ramón Pereda as Manuel Morales
- Adriana Lamar as Rosario
- Antonio R. Frausto as Mamerto
- Leopoldo Beristáin as Don Chema González
- Luis G. Barreiro as Licenciado Lángara
- Juanita Barceló as Polí Ponce
- Chucha Camacho as Chucha
- Antonio Bravo as Serafín
- Conchita Gentil Arcos as Doña Ángeles
- Fernando Soto "Mantequilla" as Taxista
- Trío Calaveras as Ensemble

== Bibliography ==
- Andrew Grant Wood. Agustin Lara: A Cultural Biography. OUP USA, 2014.
