= It Happened in Mexico =

- Directed by: Ramón Pereda
- Written by: Rafael López de Haro (novel); Ramón Pereda
- Produced by: Ramón Pereda
- Starring: María Antonieta Pons; Joaquín Cordero; Carmelita González
- Cinematography: Agustín Jiménez
- Edited by: Alberto Valenzuela
- Music by: Manuel Esperón
- Production company: Pereda Films
- Release date: 15 August 1958
- Running time: 90 minutes
- Country: Mexico
- Language: Spanish

It Happened in Mexico (Spanish: Sucedió en México) is a 1958 Mexican musical film directed by Ramón Pereda and starring María Antonieta Pons, Joaquín Cordero and Carmelita González.

The film's sets were designed by the art director Jorge Fernández.

== Cast ==
- Luis Aguilar
- José Baviera
- Lola Beltrán
- Antonio Bribiesca
- Sara Cabrera
- Humberto Canos
- Manuel Casanueva
- Joaquín Cordero
- Orquesta de Ingeniería
- Carmelita González
- Manolo
- Raúl Meraz
- José Peña
- Ignacio Peón
- María Antonieta Pons
- Silvestre
- Cuco Sánchez
- Tabaquito
- Trío Avileño
- Mariachi Vargas
- Nora Veryán

== Bibliography ==
- Riera, Emilio García . Historia documental del cine mexicano: 1957-1958. Universidad de Guadalajara, 1992.
