= Susana (film) =

- Theatrical poster
- Directed by: Luis Buñuel
- Written by: Luis Buñuel; Jaime Salvador; Rodolfo Usigli
- Based on: Susana by Manuel Reachi
- Produced by: Sergio Kogan; Manuel Reachi
- Starring: Rosita Quintana; Fernando Soler
- Cinematography: José Ortiz Ramos
- Edited by: Jorge Bustos
- Music by: Raúl Lavista
- Release date: 1951
- Running time: 82 minutes
- Country: Mexico
- Language: Spanish

Susana (Spanish: Susana, demonio y carne; also The Devil and the Flesh) is a 1951 film directed by Luis Buñuel. It is the story of a girl of questionable mental stability who escapes from incarceration and ends up at a plantation where she disrupts a working family's daily routines and chemistry. Susana includes several characterizations, dynamics, and scenes that reflect Buñuel's frequent mockery of Christian religiosity.

== Plot ==
Susana, is a beautiful inmate of a reformatory. When first seen, Susana is thrown into a solitary cell with bats and rats for misbehaving and the correction officer says Imagine, she's been here two years and is worse than ever!. In her cell, she asks for God's help, facing a shadow of the cross formed by the window bars across which a spider crawls away. She manages to pull the bars across the window away from the rotting walls and escapes into the stormy night.

Ending up at a ranch, she is offered shelter after she gives an invented history. She soon entices the men, who become obsessed with possessing her and end up fighting over her: Jesús, the ranch foreman; Alberto, the family's teenage son; and Guadalupe, Alberto's father, "a God-fearing man and the faithful husband of the beautiful, patient Dona Carmen."

== Cast ==
- Fernando Soler as Don Guadalupe
- Rosita Quintana as Susana
- Víctor Manuel Mendoza as Jesús
- María Gentil Arcos as Felisa
- Luis López Somoza as Alberto
- Matilde Palou as Doña Carmen
- Rafael Icardo as Don Severiano, veterinary
- Enrique del Castillo as Reformatory official

== Analysis ==
Gilles Deleuze in his work Cinema 1: The Movement Image talks about the impulse-image in Susana "that achieves the complete exhaustion of a milieu: mother, servant, son and father. The impulse must be exhaustive. It is not even sufficient to say that the impulse contents itself with what a milieu gives it or leaves to it. This contentment is not resignation, but a great joy in which the impulse rediscovers its power of choice, since it is, at the deepest level, the desire to change milieu, to seek a new milieu to explore, to dislocate, enjoying all the more what this milieu offers, however low, repulsive or disgusting it may be. The joys of the impulse cannot be measured against the affect, that is, against the intrinsic qualities of the possible object."

== Critical response ==
In his 2015 publication of movie ratings, Leonard Maltin wrote 'Well handled and staged by Buñuel till the cop-out finale.

== Release ==
Susana was released on DVD on 27 November 2007.
