= A Girl from Chicago =

- Directed by: Manuel Mur Oti
- Written by: Noel Clarasó; Manuel Martínez Remís; Manuel Mur Oti
- Produced by: Francisco Fernández de Rojas
- Starring: Ana Bertha Lepe; Javier Armet; Rafael Durán
- Cinematography: José F. Aguayo; Godofredo Pacheco
- Edited by: Antonio Gimeno
- Music by: José Pagán; Antonio Ramírez Ángel
- Production company: Planeta Films
- Distributed by: Buhigas Films
- Release date: 27 June 1960
- Running time: 104 minutes
- Country: Spain
- Language: Spanish

A Girl from Chicago (Spanish: Una chica de Chicago) is a 1960 Spanish comedy film directed by Manuel Mur Oti and starring Ana Bertha Lepe, Javier Armet and Rafael Durán.

== synopsis ==
A Spanish girl educated in Chicago comes back to her little town and starts a feminist movement. The male hillbillies are confused and scared, so they beg help to a lawyer, the mayor's son.

== Cast ==
- Ana Bertha Lepe
- Javier Armet
- Rafael Durán
- Roberto Rey
- José María Lado
- Ángel Ter
- Porfiria Sanchíz
- Joaquín Roa
- Tony Soler
- Manuel Bermúdez 'Boliche'
- Luana Alcañiz
- Manuel Requena
- Lola Alba
- Pilar Gómez Ferrer
- Julia Pachelo
- Ángel Calero
- Josefina Bejarano
- Ramón Giner
- Félix Briones
- Fernando San Clemente
- Pilar Sanclemente
- Marisa Prado
- José Marco Davó

== Bibliography ==
- Labanyi, Jo & Pavlović, Tatjana. A Companion to Spanish Cinema. John Wiley & Sons, 2012.
