= The Devil Is a Woman (1950 film) =

1950 film

- Directed by: Tito Davison
- Written by: Edmundo Báez; Tito Davison; Luis Fernández Ardavín; Ricardo López Méndez
- Produced by: Victor Purcell; Joseph Satinsky; Gregorio Walerstein
- Starring: María Félix
- Cinematography: Alex Phillips
- Edited by: Rafael Ceballos
- Release date: 28 January 1950
- Running time: 95 minutes
- Country: Mexico
- Language: Spanish

The Devil Is a Woman (Spanish: Doña Diabla) is a 1950 Mexican drama film directed by Tito Davison. It was entered into the 1951 Cannes Film Festival.

== Cast ==
- María Félix - Angela
- Víctor Junco - Adrian Villanueva
- Crox Alvarado - Esteban
- José María Linares-Rivas - Lic. Octavio Sotelo Vargas
- Perla Aguiar - Angélica
- Dalia Íñiguez - Gertrudis
- Luis Beristáin - Cura
- José Baviera - Ernesto Solar Fuentes
- Beatriz Ramos - Carmela
- Nicolás Rodríguez (actor) - Pepe Luis
- Salvador Quiroz - Amante Viejo
- Alejandro Cobo - El Cojo
- Juan Orraca - Policia
- Isabel del Puerto - Clara
- Carlos Múzquiz - Martínez, de la casa de juegos
