= Los Fernández de Peralvillo =

- Directed by: Alejandro Galindo
- Written by: Juan H. Durán, Casahonda, Alejandro Galindo
- Produced by: Alianza Cinematografica Mexicana S.A. de C.V.
- Starring: Victor Parra, David Silva, Sara García
- Music by: Gustavo César Carrión
- Release date: 1954
- Country: Mexico
- Language: Spanish

Los Fernández de Peralvillo is a 1954 Mexican film directed by Alejandro Galindo. The film is based in the play of Juan H. Durán and Casahonda. It stars Sara García, Victor Parra, and David Silva.

== Synopsis ==
Mario is a fatherless and lives in Peralvillo with his two sisters and his mother. As he has no studies, he is related to some thugs, with whom he becomes rich and powerful. However, Mario ends up despising his people, and little by little, loneliness takes over him. One night, intending to make amends, he takes a walk around Peralvillo, his old neighborhood, but fate prepares to collect his debts, and there he meets a guy he despised long ago, who ends his life.

== Prizes and awards ==
Los Fernández de Peralvillo received six Ariel Awards, included Best Movie and Best Director. The movie also received nine nominations.

Year	Award	Category	Nominee	Result
1955	Ariel	Best Movie		Won
1955	Ariel	Best Director	Alejandro Galindo	Won
1955	Ariel	Best Actor	Victor Parra	Won
1955	Ariel	Best Supporting Actor	Andrés Soler	Nomination
1955	Ariel	Best Picture Actress	Leonor Llausás	Won
1955	Ariel	Best Original Screenplay	Juan Durán y Casahonda	Won
1955	Ariel	Best Adapted Screenplay	Marco Aurelio Galindo	Won
1955	Ariel	Best Movie Edition	Gloria Schoemann	Nomination
1955	Ariel	Best Sound	Manuel Topete	Nomination
