= Untouched (film) =

1954 film by Roberto Gavaldón

- Directed by: Roberto Gavaldón
- Written by: Luis Alcoriza; Rafael García Travesi; Roberto Gavaldón; José Revueltas
- Based on: Sombra Verde by Ramiro Torres Septién
- Produced by: Guillermo Calderón; Pedro A. Calderón
- Starring: Ricardo Montalbán; Ariadna Welter; Víctor Parra
- Cinematography: Alex Phillips
- Edited by: Gloria Schoemann
- Music by: Antonio Díaz Conde
- Production company: Producciones Calderón
- Release date: 23 December 1954
- Running time: 85 minutes
- Country: Mexico
- Language: Spanish

Untouched or Green Shadow (Spanish: Sombra verde) is a 1954 Mexican adventure thriller film directed by Roberto Gavaldón and starring Ricardo Montalbán, Ariadna Welter and Víctor Parra. It was made at the Churubusco Studios in Mexico City. The film's sets were designed by the art director Manuel Fontanals. Location shooting took place around El Tajín and Papantla in Veracruz.

== Synopsis ==
A young scientist employed by a pharmaceutical company Federico Gascón heads out to a remote party Mexico in search of barbasco roots to be used in the production of cortisone. This soon proves to an extremely dangerous trek through jungle and mountain in a high attempts are made on his life. He also falls in love with Yáscara, a beautiful villager.

== Cast ==
- Ricardo Montalban as Federico Gascón
- Ariadne Welter as Yáscara
- Víctor Parra as Don Ignacio Santos, padre de Yáscara
- Jorge Martínez de Hoyos as Pedro González
- Miguel Inclán as Máximo
- Jaime Fernández as Bernabé
- Roberto G. Rivera as Teniente
- Enriqueta Reza as Victoriana
- Ana María Villaseñor as Juanita
- Francisco Jambrina as Jefe de Federico

== Bibliography ==
- Amador, María Luisa. Cartelera cinematográfica, 1950-1959. UNAM, 1985.
- Sánchez, Francisco. Crónica antisolemne del cine mexicano. Universidad Veracruzana, 1989.
