= The Fallen Angel (1949 film) =

1949 film

- Directed by: Juan José Ortega
- Written by: Francisco Navarro; Ramón Obón; Ramón Peón
- Produced by: Juan José Ortega; Ramón Peón
- Starring: Rafael Baledón; Rosita Quintana; Dalia Íñiguez
- Cinematography: Jorge Stahl Jr.
- Edited by: Rafael Ceballos
- Music by: Gonzalo Curiel
- Production company: Compañía Cinematográfica Mexicana
- Release date: 16 June 1949
- Running time: 92 minutes
- Country: Mexico
- Language: Spanish

The Fallen Angel (Spanish: El ángel caído) is a 1949 Mexican drama film directed by Juan José Ortega and starring Rafael Baledón, Rosita Quintana and Dalia Íñiguez. The film's sets were designed by the art director Ramón Rodríguez Granada.

== Cast ==
- Rafael Baledón as Ingeniero Carlos Linares
- Rosita Quintana as Alicia
- José María Linares-Rivas as Menéndez
- Dalia Íñiguez as Emeterio's wife
- Carlos Riquelme as Carbajal
- Ernesto Finance as Don Emeterio
- Sonora Matancera as Themselves
- Jesús Alvariño as Self
- Luis Echegoyen as Self
- Daniel Santos as Self
- Aníbal de Mar asSelf
- Leopoldo Fernández as Self
- Mimí Cal as Self

== Bibliography ==
- Johannessen, Lene M. Site-Seeing Aesthetics: California Sojourns in Five Installations. BRILL, 2020.
- Riera, Emilio García. Historia documental del cine mexicano: 1946-1948. Universidad de Guadalajara, 1992
