= You Have the Eyes of a Deadly Woman (1947 film) =

1947 film

- Directed by: Ramón Peón
- Written by: Ramón Pereda; Carlos Sampelayo
- Based on: You Have the Eyes of a Deadly Woman by Enrique Jardiel Poncela
- Produced by: Ramón Pereda
- Starring: Ramón Pereda; Adriana Lamar; Luana Alcañiz
- Cinematography: Jesús Hernández
- Edited by: Alfredo Rosas Priego
- Music by: Leo Cardona
- Production company: Pereda Films
- Distributed by: Perada Films
- Release date: 14 July 1947
- Running time: 85 minutes
- Country: Mexico
- Language: Spanish

You Have the Eyes of a Deadly Woman (Spanish: Usted tiene ojos de mujer fatal) is a 1947 Mexican romantic comedy film directed by Ramón Peón and starring Ramón Pereda, Adriana Lamar and Luana Alcañiz. The film's sets were designed by the art director Ramón Rodríguez Granada. It is an adaptation of the 1926 Spanish play by Enrique Jardiel Poncela. The play was adapted into a 1962 Spanish film You Have the Eyes of a Deadly Woman.

== Cast ==
- Ramón Pereda as Osidori
- Adriana Lamar as Elena Fortún
- Luana Alcañiz as Pepita
- Elena D'Orgaz as Francisca
- Carolina Barret as Enamorada de Sergio
- Maruja Grifell as Condesa de San Isidro
- Margarita Carbajal as Adelaida
- Micaela Castejón as Esposa de Reynaldo
- María Elena de la Cruz as Leonor
- Anita Villalaz as Pariente
- Eleanor Stadie as Nita Nurmi
- Yolanda Reyes as Nina
- José Baviera as Sergio Hernán
- José Goula as Reynaldo Pantecosti
- Jesús Valero as Arturito
- Rafael Acevedo as Indalecio Cruz
- Fernando Flaquer as Pariente
- Francisco Reiguera as Roberto
- Paulino Quevedo as Felipe

== Bibliography ==
- Riera, Emilio García. Historia documental del cine mexicano: 1943-1945. Universidad de Guadalajara, 1992
- Wilt, David E. The Mexican Filmography, 1916 through 2001. McFarland, 2024.
