= Jalisco Fair =

1948 film by Chano Urueta

- Directed by: Chano Urueta
- Written by: Chano Urueta
- Produced by: Eduardo Quevedo
- Starring: Ramón Armengod; Ninón Sevilla; Perla Aguiar
- Cinematography: Ignacio Torres
- Edited by: Carlos Savage
- Music by: José de la Vega
- Distributed by: Azteca Films
- Release date: 20 May 1948
- Running time: 100 minutes
- Country: Mexico
- Language: Spanish

Jalisco Fair (Spanish: La feria de Jalisco) is a 1948 Mexican musical comedy film directed by Chano Urueta and starring Ramón Armengod, Ninón Sevilla and Perla Aguiar. The film's sets were designed by the art director Javier Torres Torija.

== Cast ==
- Ramón Armengod
- Ninón Sevilla
- Perla Aguiar
- Andrés Soler
- Emma Roldán
- Aurora Walker
- Enrique García Álvarez
- José Eduardo Pérez
- Alicia Ravel
- José Pulido

== Bibliography ==
- Riera, Emilio García. Historia documental del cine mexicano: 1946-1948. Universidad de Guadalajara, 1992.
