= Nobody's Children (1952 film) =

1952 film

- Directed by: Carlos Véjar hijo
- Written by: Carlos Villatoro
- Produced by: Mário Gutiérrez Roldán
- Starring: David Silva; Carmelita González; Dagoberto Rodríguez
- Cinematography: Rosalío Solano
- Edited by: Carlos Savage
- Music by: Federico Baena
- Production company: Producciones Independientes
- Release date: 1 September 1952
- Running time: 85 minutes
- Country: Mexico
- Language: Spanish

Nobody's Children (Spanish: Los hijos de nadie) is a 1952 Mexican crime drama film directed by Carlos Véjar hijo and starring David Silva, Carmelita González and Dagoberto Rodríguez. It was shot at the Churubusco Studios in Mexico City. The film's sets were designed by the art director José Rodríguez Granada.

== Cast ==
- David Silva as José López Martínez
- Carmelita González as María
- Dagoberto Rodríguez as Raúl
- Marina Herrera as Rosa
- Dalia Íñiguez as Doña Jovita Martínez vda. de López
- Rodolfo Landa as Luis Molina
- Aurora Walker as Profesora Marin
- Federico Curiel as Pichirilo
- Mario Humberto Jiménez Pons as Pepito
- Miguel Funes hijo as Luisito
- Lucha Elsa Quinoñes as Rosa
- Guillermo Bravo Sosa as Simón
- Roberto Meyer as Don Roberto
- Ana María Hernández as Patrona de María
- María Luisa Smith as Doña Camilita
- Luis Mussot as Don Juve
- Humberto Rodríguez as Don Martiniano
- Javier de la Parra as Competidor de arboleda en billar
- Elvira Villaseñor as Lola
- Agustín Fernández as Motorista borracho
- Humberto Osuna as Juez en conmpetencia

== Bibliography ==
- Amador, María Luisa. Cartelera cinematográfica, 1950-1959. UNAM, 1985.
- Riera, Emilio García . Historia documental del cine mexicano: 1952. Ediciones Era, 1969.
