= The Ship of Monsters =

- Directed by: Rogelio A. González
- Written by: Alfredo Varela, Jr. (adaptation)
- Story by: José María Fernández Unsáin
- Produced by: Jesús Sotomayor Martínez
- Starring: Eulalio González «Piporro» Ana Bertha Lepe; Lorena Velázquez; Consuelo Frank
- Cinematography: Raúl Martínez Solares
- Edited by: Carlos Savage
- Music by: Sergio Guerrero
- Production company: Producciones Sotomayor
- Release date: 22 January 1960 (Mexico City)
- Running time: 81 minutes
- Country: Mexico
- Language: Spanish

The Ship of Monsters (Spanish: La nave de los monstruos) is a 1960 Mexican comic science fiction film, based on a story by José María Fernández Unsáin, directed by Rogelio A. González and starred Eulalio González «Piporro», Ana Bertha Lepe, Lorena Velázquez and Consuelo Frank.

In the film, two Venusian women are in search of potential mates. They land in Mexico and fall for a singing cowboy.

== Plot ==
Two Venusian women, Gamma (Lepe) and Beta (Velázquez), are sent on a mission by their queen (Consuelo Frank) to search for males to repopulate the planet. Along the way, they and their servant, Tor the robot, acquire a colorful array of male extraterrestrial creatures in their "ship of monsters", including Martian prince Tagual, Uk the cyclops, Utirr the spider and skeletal Zok.

Landing in Mexico, Gamma and Beta become enamored with singing cowboy Lauriano (Eulalio González «Piporro»).

== Cast ==
- Eulalio González «Piporro» as Lauriano Treviño Gómez
- Ana Bertha Lepe as Gamma
- Lorena Velázquez as Beta
- Consuelo Frank as Regente de Venus
- Manuel Alvarado as Ruperto
- Heberto Dávila, Jr. as Chuy Treviño Gómez
- Mario García "Harapos" as Borracho
- José Pardavé as Atenógenes
- Jesús Rodríguez Cárdenas

== Reception ==
Filmstruck critic Jeff Stafford called it "one of the more exotic genre hybrids that emerged from Mexico in the early sixties, mixing sci-fi, horror and Western elements into something uniquely original".

Beth Accomando of KPBS praised the film, saying, "You'll find deliciously low budget sets Ed Wood would die for; a know-it-all robot; babes in bathing suit space uniforms; and a refreshing Mexican take on American sci-fi conventions".
