= Carolina Barret =

Mexican actress (1916–2010)

- Born: 21 October 1916
- Died: 13 October 2010 (aged 93); Mexico
- Occupation: Actress
- Years active: 1937-1988 (film)

Carolina Barret (21 October 1916 – 13 October 2010) was a Mexican film actress.

== Selected filmography ==
- Such Is My Country (1937)
- Poppy of the Road (1937)
- Narciso's Hard Luck (1940)
- The Unknown Policeman (1941)
- Five Minutes of Love (1941)
- Alejandra (1942)
- La razón de la culpa (1942)
- María Eugenia (1943)
- Santa (1943)
- Land of Passions (1943)
- Beautiful Michoacán (1943)
- Cruel Destiny (1944)
- Tragic Wedding (1946)
- Five Faces of Woman (1947)
- You Have the Eyes of a Deadly Woman (1947)
- Fly Away, Young Man! (1947)
- Opium (1949)
- Doctor on Call (1950)
- Hotel Room (1953)
- Black Ace (1954)
- Tívoli (1974)
- 41, el hombre perfecto (1982)

== Bibliography ==
- Rogelio Agrasánchez. Guillermo Calles: A Biography of the Actor and Mexican Cinema Pioneer. McFarland, 2010.
