= The Magnificent Beast =

1953 film by Chano Urueta

- Directed by: Chano Urueta
- Written by: Chano Urueta (screenplay), Neftalí Beltrán (screen story)
- Produced by: Fidel Pizarro
- Starring: Miroslava, Crox Alvarado, Wolf Ruvinskis, José Elías Moreno, Irma Dorantes, Miguel Manzano
- Cinematography: Agustín Jiménez
- Edited by: Jorge Bustos
- Music by: José de la Vega
- Distributed by: Películas Nacionales
- Release date: 22 May 1953
- Running time: 128 minutes
- Country: Mexico
- Language: Spanish

La bestia magnífica (Lucha libre) ("The Magnificent Beast (Wrestling)") is a 1953 Mexican film directed by Chano Urueta. It tells the story of two good friends who become wrestlers to leave poverty behind, but the arrival of an ambitious woman will tragically change their destiny.

Director Urueta was so enthusiastic about the project that he filmed three fights in their entirety, and the final cut came to 128 minutes, which was very unusual in the Mexican film industry. The production is regarded as the film that started the genre of "wrestling movies", which became immensely popular in Mexico for many decades.

José Elías Moreno won the Ariel Award for Best Supporting Actor and Jorge Bustos for Best Film Editing.

== Cast ==
- Crox Alvarado: David
- Wolf Ruvinskis: Carlos
- José Elías Moreno: 'Maravilla' López
- Irma Dorantes: Teresita
- Miguel Manzano: Benjamín Aguilar
- José Luis Rojas: Luis Rojas
- Ismael Pérez: Poncianito
- Enrique Llanes: Wrestler
- Rito Romero: Wrestler
- Miroslava: Meche
