= Luana Alcañiz =

Spanish actress

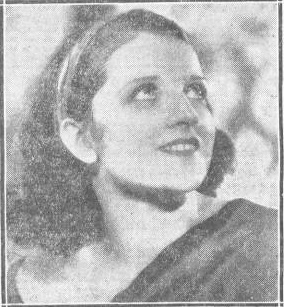
- Born: 8 May 1906; Madrid, Spain
- Died: 24 July 1991 (aged 85); Madrid, Spain
- Occupation: Actress
- Years active: 1930–1965 (film)

Luana Alcañiz (1906–1991) was a Spanish actress. She appeared in a number of films during the Golden Age of Mexican Cinema. Her final uncredited, appearance was in the 1965 film Doctor Zhivago by David Lean.

== Selected filmography ==
- Primavera en otoño (1933)
- Nothing More Than a Woman (1934)
- Frontiers of '49 (1939)
- Verbena Tragica (1939)
- The Shack (1945)
- María Magdalena (1946)
- Chachita from Triana (1947)
- You Have the Eyes of a Deadly Woman (1947)
- Nobody's Wife (1950)
- A Girl from Chicago (1960)
- Doctor Zhivago (1965)

== Bibliography ==
- Mora, Carl J. Mexican Cinema: Reflections of a Society, 1896-2004. McFarland, 2005.
- Finkielman, Jorge. The Film Industry in Argentina: An Illustrated Cultural History. McFarland, 2003.
- Castelli, Louis P. & Cleeland, Caryn Lynn. David Lean: A Guide to References and Resources. G.K. Hall, 1980.
