= Arsène Lupin (1947 film) =

1947 film

- Directed by: Ramón Peón
- Written by: Antonio Helú; Ramón Pereda
- Based on: Arsène Lupin by Maurice Leblanc
- Produced by: Ramón Pereda
- Starring: Ramón Pereda; Adriana Lamar; Juan Pulido; José Baviera
- Cinematography: Jesús Hernández
- Edited by: Alfredo Rosas Priego
- Music by: Leo Cardona
- Production company: Pereda Films
- Distributed by: Azteca Films
- Release date: 19 November 1947
- Running time: 77 minutes
- Country: Mexico
- Language: Spanish

Arsène Lupin (Spanish: Arsenio Lupin) is a 1947 Mexican mystery crime film directed by Ramón Peón and starring Ramón Pereda, Adriana Lamar, Juan Pulido and José Baviera. It was shot at the Azteca Studios in Mexico City. The film's sets were designed by the art director Ramón Rodríguez Granada. The plot is based on the Arsène Lupin stories by Maurice Leblanc.

== Cast ==
- Ramón Pereda as Arsenio Lupin / René Belmont
- Adriana Lamar as Isabel
- Juan Pulido as Inspector Ganimard
- José Baviera as Sherlock Holmes
- José Goula as Víctor Leclerc
- Jesús Valero as Daguerre
- Alejandro Cobo as Julio Lacombe
- Margarita Carbajal as Carlota Leclerc
- Rafael Banquells as Montigny
- Joaquín Coss as Anticuario Levin
- Luis Mussot as Doctor
- Francisco Reiguera as Napoleón Malicornio
- Ernesto Monato as Agente Mathier
- Joaquín Roche as Agente policía
- Roberto Cañedo as Rodier
- Herminia de la Fuente as Sra. Lacombe
- Juan Orraca as Agente policía
- Félix Samper as Márques estafado
- Manuel Trejo Morales as Invitado tertulia
- Jorge Arriaga as Ladrón
- Roberto Banquells Sr. as Anciano asaltado calle
- José Escanero as Dueño casa robada
- Freddy Fernández as Niño mensajero

== Bibliography ==
- Pitts, Michael R. Famous Movie Detectives II. Scarecrow Press, 1991.
- Riera, Emilio García. Historia documental del cine mexicano: 1945. Ediciones Era, 1969.
