= I Will Live Again =

1940 film

- Directed by: Roberto Rodríguez
- Written by: Vicente Oroná; Ismael Rodríguez; Roberto Rodríguez
- Produced by: Ismael Rodríguez; Roberto Rodríguez
- Starring: Adriana Lamar; Joaquín Pardavé; David Silva
- Cinematography: Alex Phillips
- Music by: Raúl Lavista
- Production company: Producciones Rodríguez Hermanos
- Distributed by: Cinexport Distributing
- Release date: 26 April 1940
- Running time: 98 minutes
- Country: Mexico
- Language: Spanish

I Will Live Again (Spanish: Viviré otra vez) is a 1940 Mexican drama film directed by Roberto Rodríguez and starring Adriana Lamar, Joaquín Pardavé and David Silva. The film's sets were designed by the art directors Mariano Rodríguez Granada and Ramón Rodríguez Granada.

== Cast ==
- Adriana Lamar as Margot
- Joaquín Pardavé as Chufas
- Alicia de Phillips as Consuelo Ledesma
- David Silva as José
- Miguel Arenas as Don Rafael de Ledesma
- Ramón Armengod as Mario Ledesma
- Luis G. Barreiro as Mayordomo Justo
- Miguel Ángel Ferriz as Don Gonzalo
- Carlos López Moctezuma as Martí
- Aurora Walker as Señora Ledesma
- Dolores Camarillo as Nana Tomasa
- Joaquín Coss as Director de la prisíon
- Manuel Noriega as Dr. Guzman
- Blanca Rosa Otero as Esperanza
- Gerardo del Castillo as Investigador
- Antonio R. Frausto as Borracho
- David Valle González as El pistolas

== Bibliography ==
- Wilt, David E. The Mexican Filmography, 1916 through 2001. McFarland, 2024.
