= Autumn and Spring =

1949 film by Adolfo Fernández Bustamante

Autumn and Spring (Spanish: Otoño y primavera) is a 1949 Mexican drama film directed by Adolfo Fernández Bustamante.

The film's sets were designed by Ramón Rodríguez Granada.

== Cast ==
- Perla Aguiar
- Irma Bonola
- Eva Calvo
- Milagros Carrillo
- Micaela Castejón
- Prudencia Grifell
- Luis Alfonso Lavalle
- Rita Macedo
- Paco Martinez
- Pablo Mendizábal
- José Luis Menéndez
- Lina Montes
- Carmen Novelty
- Elvia Pedroza
- Óscar Pulido
- Josette Simo
- Emilio Tuero

== Bibliography ==
- Román Gubern. El Cine Español en el Exilio. Lumen, 1976.
