= Cuatro contra el mundo =

- Directed by: Alejandro Galindo
- Written by: Alejandro Galindo; Gunther Gerszo
- Produced by: César Santos Galindo
- Starring: Víctor Parra; Leticia Palma
- Cinematography: Agustín Martínez Solares
- Edited by: Carlos Savage
- Music by: Gustavo César Carrión
- Release date: 6 April 1950
- Running time: 100 minutes
- Country: Mexico
- Language: Spanish

Cuatro contra el mundo (Spanish: Four Against the World) is a 1950 Mexican film noir crime drama film directed by Alejandro Galindo, who also wrote the screenplay alongside Gunther Gerzso, and starring Víctor Parra and Leticia Palma, about a gang that raids a van that carries money. The film is considered a prototype for Mexican film noir.

== Cast ==
- Víctor Parra as Paco Mendiola
- Leticia Palma as Lucrecia
- Tito Junco as Máximo
- José Pulido as Antonio Gil Tony
- Manuel Dondé as El Lagarto
- Conchita Gentil Arcos as Doña Trini
- Salvador Quiroz as El general
- Sara Montes as Novia de Tony
- José Elías Moreno as Comandante Canseco
- Bruno Márquez as Don Romulo (as Bruno T. Marquez)
- Manuel de la Vega as Domínguez, agente policía
- Ángel Infante as Manejador de cerveceria
- Carlos Bravo y Fernández as Periodista (uncredited)
- Ramón Bugarini as Detective (uncredited)
- Rafael Estrada as Periodista (uncredited)
- Jesús García as Empleado de sastre (uncredited)
- Emilio Garibay as Policía (uncredited)
- Leonor Gómez as Vecina de Lucrecia (uncredited)
- Rafael Icardo as Señor Mantecol (uncredited)
- Jorge Martínez de Hoyos as Don Nacho (uncredited)
- Manuel Trejo Morales as Maestro Flaves, sastre (uncredited)
- Alfredo Varela as Empleado de cerveceria (uncredited)
- Hernán Vera as Velador de cerveceria (uncredited)

== Themes ==
Film critic Emilio García Riera states that the film has a strong influence on the left-wing politics of director Alejandro Galindo. He stated that the film allowed him to represent a crime in a relatively small scenario as an expression of reactionary tendencies.

== Production ==
Cuatro contra el mundo is considered a prototype for a Mexican version of film noir, a genre popularized in the United States in the 1940s.

== Restoration ==
Cuatro contra el mundo has been restored in cooperation with the film library of the National Autonomous University of Mexico, Fundación Televisa, the Cineteca Nacional and the Morelia International Film Festival. The restored version was part of the Forum section of the 65th Berlin International Film Festival in 2015, after the head of this section, Christoph Terhechte, had seen it at the Morelia International Film Festival.

== Bibliography ==
- Ayala Blanco, Jorge. Cartelera cinematográfica 1950–1959.
- García Riera, Emilio. Historia Documental del Cine Mexicano.
