= Evangelina Elizondo =

Mexican actress and singer (1929–2017)

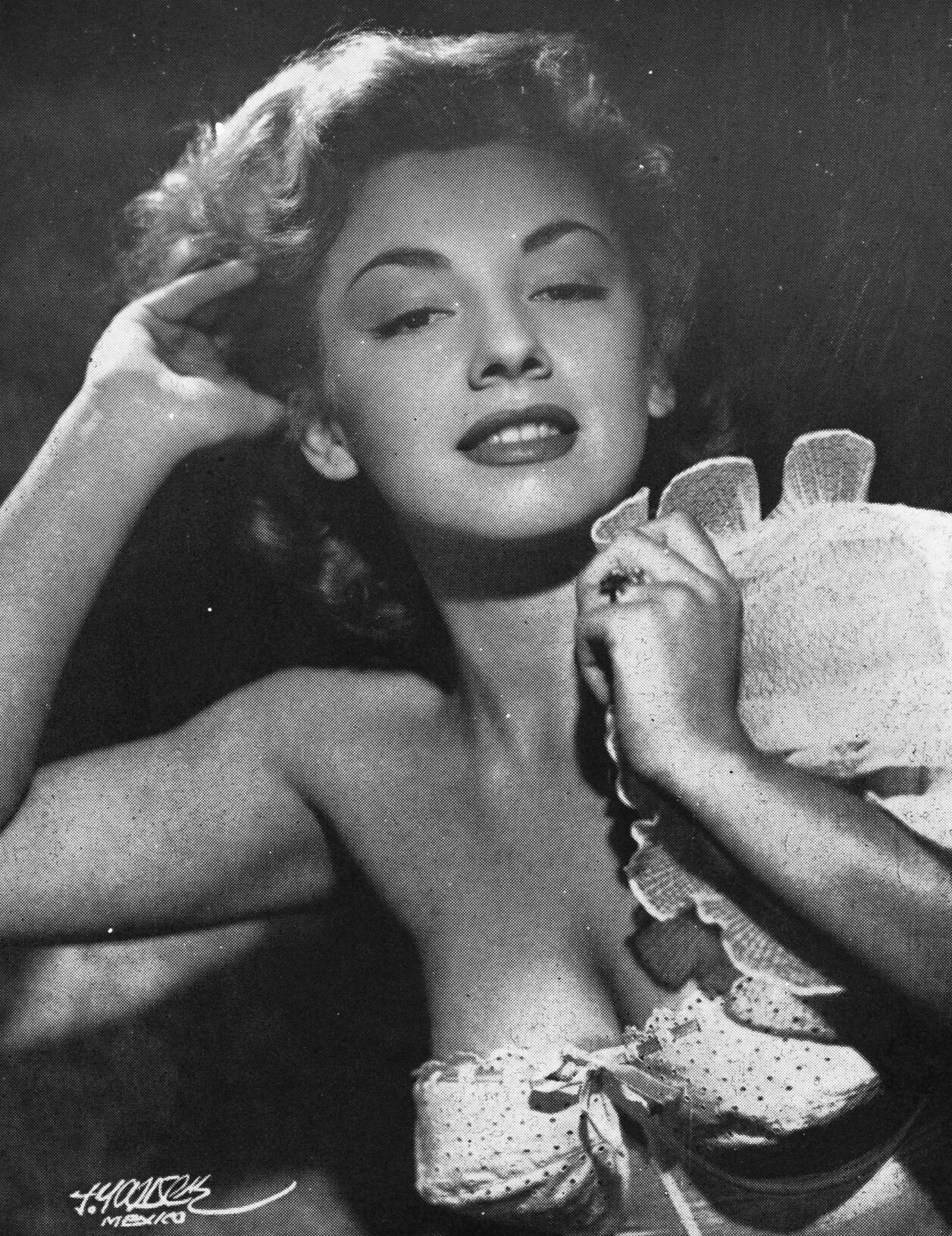
- Elizondo in 1954
- Born: Gloria Evangelina Elizondo López-Llera; 28 April 1929; Mexico City, Mexico
- Died: 2 October 2017 (aged 88); Mexico City, Mexico
- Other name: Las piernas más bonitas de México
- Occupations: Actress, singer, writer, painter
- Years active: 1948–2016
- Website: evangelinaelizondo.com

Gloria Evangelina Elizondo López-Llera (28 April 1929 – 2 October 2017), known as Evangelina Elizondo, was a Mexican actress and singer from the Golden Age of Mexican cinema. She starred in movies, television and theater. She was an accomplished artist having studied at the National School of Painting and had a degree in theology. She wrote two books and recorded numerous albums. In 2014, she received a Premios Arlequín (Harlequin Prize) for her contributions to Mexican culture.

== Biography ==
Gloria Evangelina Elizondo López-Llera was born on 28 April 1929 in Mexico City. Her mother, Evangelina López Llera, was a painter. At the age of 21, she won a contest to become the voice of Cinderella in the original Spanish-language release of the Walt Disney feature film. Her first acting performance, at the Teatro Margo was as a dancer in the 1950 production of Los de abajo by Mariano Azuela. From that starting point, she went on to participate in many stage productions including Mame, Yo y mi Chica, Dónde está el Tenor, and La viuda alegre.

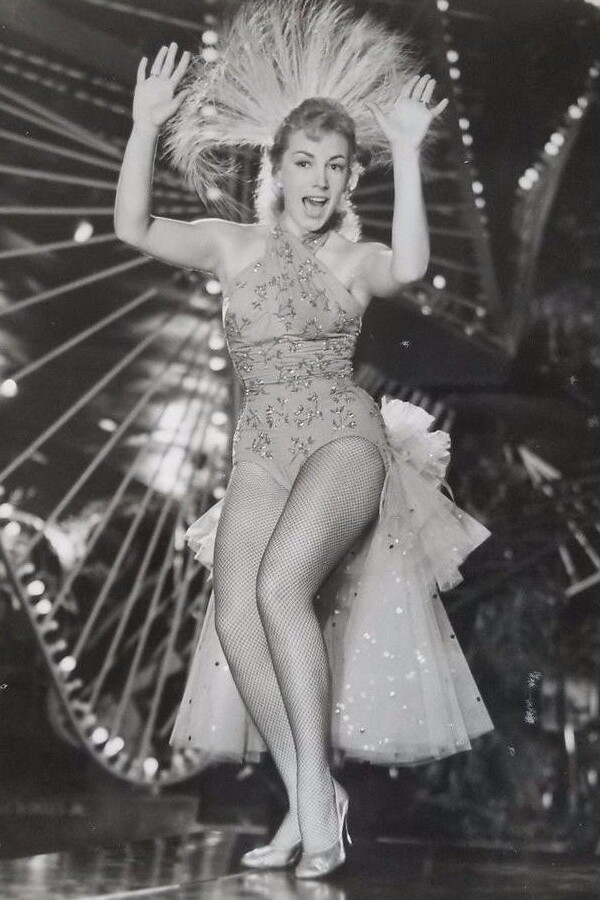
Elizondo during a performance in the Tropicana Club located at Habana, Cuba, c. 1950s

Her first film was Las locuras de Tin-Tan with Germán Valdés made in 1951. After that, some of her favorite films were Frontera Norte (1953), Educando a Papá (1954), Pueblo de Proscritos (1955), and Los Platillos Voladores (1956).

From 1954-55, she filmed nine pictures in Cuba and when she returned she made Tropicana (1956), Superflaco (1957) and El Castillo de los Monstrous (1958). The last two were personal favorites, one because it was a musical and the other because it was an Abbott and Costello-type film and the actors in it were enjoyable to work with. In her later career, Elizondo filmed El Mistero de los Hongos Alucinantes (1967), Noche de Terror (1987), and the English-language film, A Walk in the Clouds (1994). She made over 75 films, mostly comedies and musicals, as she did not like dramatic works.

In 1959, she married an engineer, José Luis Paganoni. They separated in 1960. On 27 May 1960, Elizondo, who was participating in the play 30 minutos de amor at the Rotunda Theatre with Ramón Gay, had gone to dinner with Gay after their performance. The couple was accosted by Paganoni, and during the argument, Gay was shot. Elizondo called for an ambulance and Gay was taken to Rubén Leñero Hospital. He succumbed to his wounds on 28 May 1960.

Shortly after that event, she recorded her first musical album, La sensacional Evangelina, which was released in 1961 and she has recorded numerous LPs and CDs. Her music spans from children's songs, to opera, to inspirational songs. She was the first woman to lead an orchestra, which she did for over 12 years.

Elizondo also performed in several telenovelas for both Televisa and TV Azteca. La frontera, El pecado de Oyuki, El abuelo y yo, Tres veces Sofía, Besos prohibidos and Mirada de Mujer, el regreso. In the last two, she performed as the character "Mamá Lena", who has become a cultural icon in Mexico. "Mama Lena" is the personification of traditional values meeting the modern world and the emotions that accompany the clashes that inevitably occur. In addition to serials, Elizondo has filmed several commercials, including commercials for American television. In 1996, she did a commercial for the California Milk Commission.

She studied various art media: acrylic with Froylán Ojeda, murals with Ignacio Aguirre, oils with Jorge Quiroz, who also taught her how to paint hands, and attended the National School of Painting "La Esmeralda". She studied with the master painter, José Bardasano Baos and in 1973, she held her first solo exhibition of her artworks. Initially her style was surrealistic with bold use of color, but her later works are more realistic depictions of animals, landscapes and people. As of 2014, she had participated in 64 group art showings and 15 solo exhibitions.

She studied theology and graduated with a bachelor's degree in theology in 1993 from La Salle University. She has written a book about art, as well one about philosophy, entitled "Pensamiento Abierto," and published numerous articles.

In 2004, Elizondo began working full-time at the National Association of Actors (ANDA) as Secretary of Labor and Conflicts but was dismissed in 2012. She sued and won her case for wrongful termination in 2013.

Elizondo was the recipient of a 2014 Premios Arlequín (Harlequin Prize) for her contributions to Mexican culture.

== Death and legacy ==
Elizondo died on 2 October 2017 in Mexico City, aged 88. A Google Doodle on 28 April 2019 commemorated Elizondo’s 90th birth anniversary.

== Published works ==
=== Books ===
- "Evangelina Elizondo: pintura" Instituto Nacional de Bellas Artes, Mexico City (1963) (in Spanish) (OCLC #176183788)
- "Pensamiento abierto: se puede ser feliz aun—en un mundo de hombres" Editorial Grad, Mexico City (1999) (in Spanish) (ISBN 978-9-686-21047-7)

=== Albums ===
- La sensacional Evangelina, Coro (1961) (in Spanish)
- Evangelina Elizondo, Cisne (1963) (in Spanish)

== Filmography ==
=== Film ===
- Las locuras de Tin-Tan (1952) - Paloma
- Swingtime in Mexico (1952, RKO Screenliner) - Band Singer
- Amor, qué malo eres (1953) - Lilia de la Cueva
- Genius and Figure (1953) - Victoria
- Frontera norte (1953) - Rosaura
- La intrusa (1954, Cuba) - Tania
- Los tres Villalobos (1954, Cuba)
- Educando a papá (1955, Cuba)
- Amor de lejos (1955, Cuba) - Adela
- El tren expreso (1955, Cuba) - Novia de Mario
- Qué bravas son las costeñas (1955, Cuba) - Beatriz
- Música, espuelas y amor (1955, Cuba) - Evangelina
- Los tres Villalobos (1955) - Betty
- La venganza de los Villalobos (1955, Cuba) - Betty
- Fugitivos: Pueblo de proscritos (1955) - Chabela
- Mi canción eres tú (1956) - Chui
- Viva la juventud (1956) - Walipolera
- No me platiques más (1956)
- Los Platillos Voladores (also known as Llegaron los Marcianos) (1956, Cuba) - Saturnina
- Los platillos voladores (1956) - Saturnina
- Las zapatillas verdes (1956) - Rosalinda
- Rapto al sol (1956)
- Tropicana (1957)
- Te vi en tv (1958) - Rita
- Tú y la mentira (1958) - María Veléz
- Música en la noche (1958)
- Manos arriba (1958) - Gloria
- El castillo de los monstruos (1958) - Beatriz
- El superflaco (1959) - Rebeca; Brigida Loyo
- Ángel del infierno (1959)
- Verano violento (1960) - Sofía
- Una canción para recordar (1960)
- México lindo y querido (1961)
- Tres balas perdidas (1961) - Bárbara
- La furia del ring (1961)
- Los falsos héroes (1962)
- La chacota (1962)
- Días de otoño (1963) - Rita
- Un hombre en la trampa (1965) - Sra. Fuentes
- El amor no es pecado (1965) - Pilar, la chalupa
- Pistoleros del oeste (1965)
- Un callejón sin salida (1965) - Patricia
- El tragabalas (1966) - Luz
- Esta noche no (1966) - Berta
- Domingo salvaje (1967)
- Un novio para dos hermanas (1967)
- Don Juan 67 (1967)
- El misterio de los hongos alucinantes (1968)
- El matrimonio es como el demonio (1969) - Señora Ancira
- El hombre de negro (1969) - Mary
- Gregorio and His Angel (1970)
- La generala (1971) - Raquel
- Te quiero (1979)
- Don't Panic (1988) - Reception Nurse
- ¿Nos traicionará el presidente? (1988) - Señora Rodriguez
- Romero (1989) - Josephina Gatedo
- A Walk in the Clouds (1995) - Guadelupe Aragon
- There Is No Pain in Paradise (1995) - Dona Carlota
- Alta tensión (1997)
- E pur si muove (2003, Short)
- Las Buenrostro (2005) - Brigida
- Me late chocolate (2013) - Abuela Moni
- Princesa, una historia verdadera (2018) - María (final film role)

=== Telenovelas ===
- Frontera (1967)
- El pecado de Oyuki (1988) - Diana
- El abuelo y yo (1992) - Sofia
- Mirada de mujer (1997–1998) - Doña Elena viuda de Domínguez "Mamálena"
- Tres veces Sofía (1998) - Magnolia
- Besos prohibidos (1999) - Cristina
- Cuando seas mia (2001–2002) - Doña Inés Ugarte Vda. de Sánchez Serrano
- Mirada de mujer: El regreso (2003) - Doña Elena viuda de Domínguez "Mamálena"
- La heredera (2004)
- Amores cruzados (2006) - Sara
- Pasión Morena (2009–2010) - Doña Josefina Vda. de Sirenio

=== Television series ===
- La hora marcada (Episodio: Pin pon papas) (1989)
