= Ramón Rodríguez Granada =

Mexican art director

- Occupation: Art director
- Years active: 1934 - 1970 (film)

Ramón Rodríguez Granada was a Mexican art director. He designed the sets for more than two hundred films during his career.

== Selected filmography ==
- Poppy of the Road (1937)
- Huapango (1938)
- I Will Live Again (1940)
- The Eternal Secret (1942)
- Alejandra (1942)
- Beautiful Michoacán (1943)
- Cruel Destiny (1944)
- Adam, Eve and the Devil (1945)
- Caribbean Rose (1946)
- A Woman of the East (1946)
- You Have the Eyes of a Deadly Woman (1947)
- Arsène Lupin (1947)
- Opium (1949)
- Autumn and Spring (1949)
- Don't Love Me So Much (1949)
- The Fallen Angel (1949)
- Love in Every Port (1949)
- The Lost City (1950)
- My Favourite (1950)
- Cabaret Shanghai (1950)
- To the Sound of the Mambo (1950)
- Beauty Salon (1951)
- Serenade in Acapulco (1951)
- Good Night, My Love (1951)
- Lost Love (1951)
- The Chicken Hawk (1951)
- The Guests of the Marquesa (1951)
- My Husband (1951)
- What Idiots Men Are (1951)
- The Border Man (1952)
- The Justice of the Wolf (1952)
- The Lone Wolf (1952)
- The Wolf Returns (1952)
- Tropical Delirium (1952)
- The Unknown Mariachi (1953)
- My Three Merry Widows (1953)
- Black Ace (1954)

== Bibliography ==
- Aaker, Everett. George Raft: The Films. McFarland, 2013.
