= El revoltoso =

- Directed by: Gilberto Martínez Solares
- Written by: Gilberto Martínez Solares; Juan García
- Produced by: Óscar J. Brooks; Ernesto Enríquez; Felipe Mier
- Starring: Germán Valdés; Rebeca Iturbide; Perla Aguiar
- Cinematography: Jorge Stahl Jr.
- Edited by: José W. Bustos
- Music by: Luis H. Breton
- Release date: August 16, 1951 (Mexico)
- Running time: 90 minutes
- Country: Mexico
- Language: Spanish

El Revoltoso ("The Troublemaker") is a 1951 Mexican comedy film written and directed by Gilberto Martínez Solares, and starring Germán Valdés "Tin-Tan", Rebeca Iturbide and Perla Aguiar. This film marked the acting debut de Antonio "El Ratón" Valdés, Tin-Tan's brother.

== Plot ==
A well-intentioned man always creates trouble for other people, sometimes on purpose and sometimes by accident. He is of humble origins and his job is shining shoes. He has a girlfriend, Lupita, who is also poor. After many adventures, he finally makes enough money and is able to marry Lupita.
