= Aurora Walker =

Mexican actress

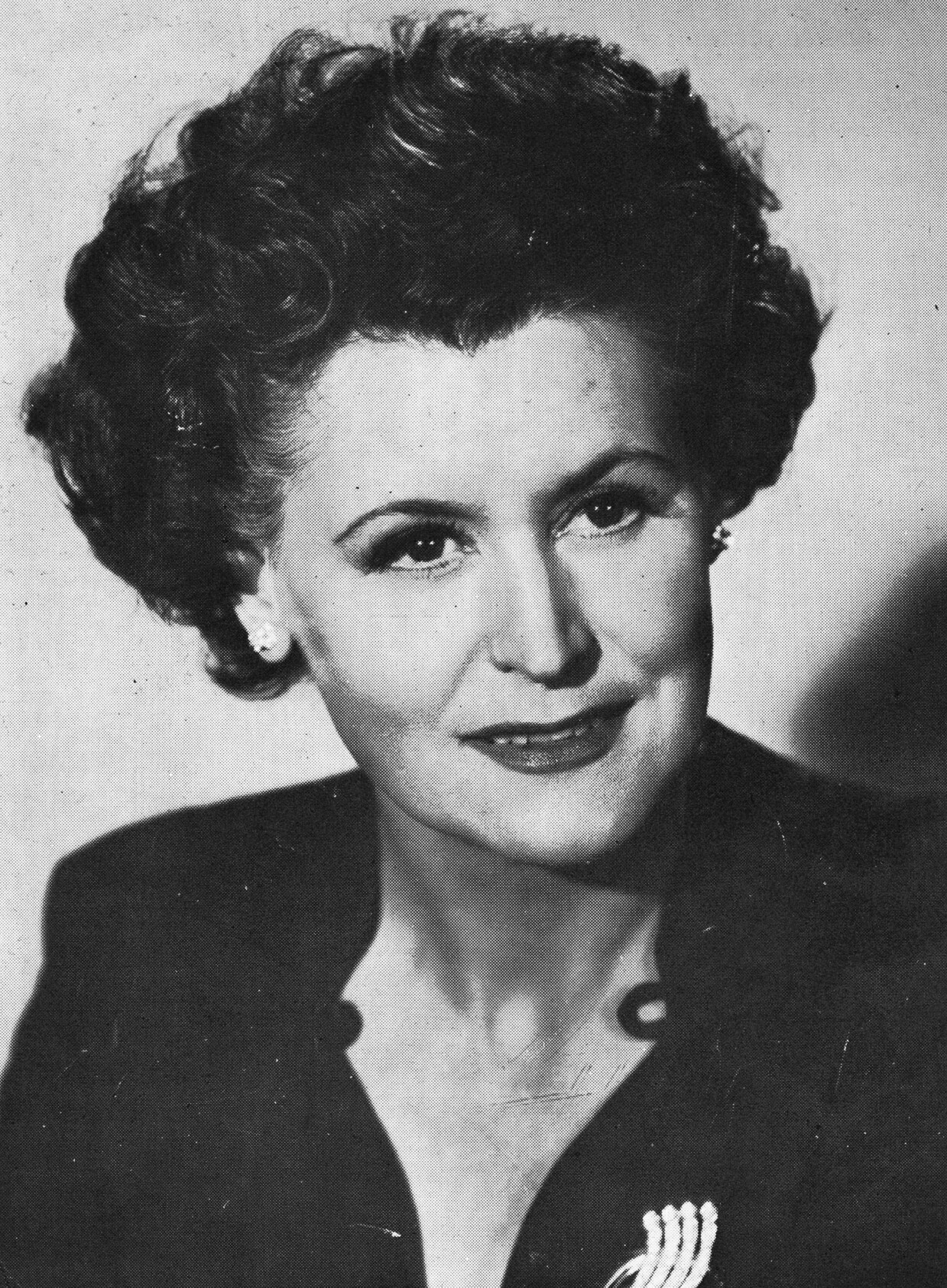
- Aurora Walker in 1954
- Born: 28 July 1904; Mexico City, Mexico
- Died: 2 January 1964 (aged 59); Mexico City, Mexico
- Occupation: Actress
- Years active: 1934 - 1964 (film)

Aurora Walker García (1904–1964) was a Mexican film actress. She appeared in more than a hundred and twenty films during her career. She was married to Mexican actor Julio Taboada until her death (suicide by electrocution) 2 January 1964. Their son is Mexican movie writer and director Carlos Enrique Taboada.

== Selected filmography ==
- With Villa's Veterans (1939)
- I Will Live Again (1940)
- Voices of Spring (1947)
- The Game Rooster (1948)
- Beau Ideal (1948)
- Jalisco Fair (1948)
- The Woman I Lost (1949)
- Red Rain (1950)
- The Lone Wolf (1952)
- The Justice of the Wolf (1952)
- I Don't Deny My Past (1952)
- The Wolf Returns (1952)
- Nobody's Children (1952)
- The Night Is Ours (1952)
- Sister Alegría (1952)
- Genius and Figure (1953)
