= Lucy González =

Colombian singer

- Also known as: La Cieguita
- Born: Lucía Inés González Bedoya; 14 September 1933; Ciénaga de Oro, Colombia
- Died: 20 October 1994 (aged 61) Ciénaga de Oro, Colombia

Lucía Inés González Bedoya (Note: In this Spanish name, the first or paternal surname is González and the second or maternal family name is Bedoya.) (1933–1994), known as Lucy González, was a Colombian singer. González was blind from birth, and sang with Antolín Lenes and Lucho Campillo. She is particularly remembered for her recordings of the songs "Sonia", "El Polvorete", and "La Tabaquera".

== Biography ==
González was born on 14 September 1933 in Ciénaga de Oro, in the Colombian department of Córdoba. She was born blind.

González' debut as a singer is debated, but from the age of 10 she was singing with groups including Lucho Campillo's Los Reales Orenses and with the Sonora Panaguá led by Johnny Saenz. González sang in a trio with her brother Manuel Antonio González and cousin Cruz del Carmen González, who were both also blind, on backing vocals and accordion respectively. At the age of 13 she started singing with the Combo Los Galleros, led by Antolín Lenes, who later married her sister Bertilda. González went on to sing with other groups led by Lenes, including the Sonora Cienaguera and Antolín y su Combo Orense.

González is particularly remembered for her recordings of the songs "Sonia", "El Polvorete" (a merengue written by her brother Manuel Antonio), and "La Tabaquera". She died on 20 October 1994 in Ciénaga de Oro.
