= Perla Aguiar =

Cuban-Mexican actress (1932–2015)

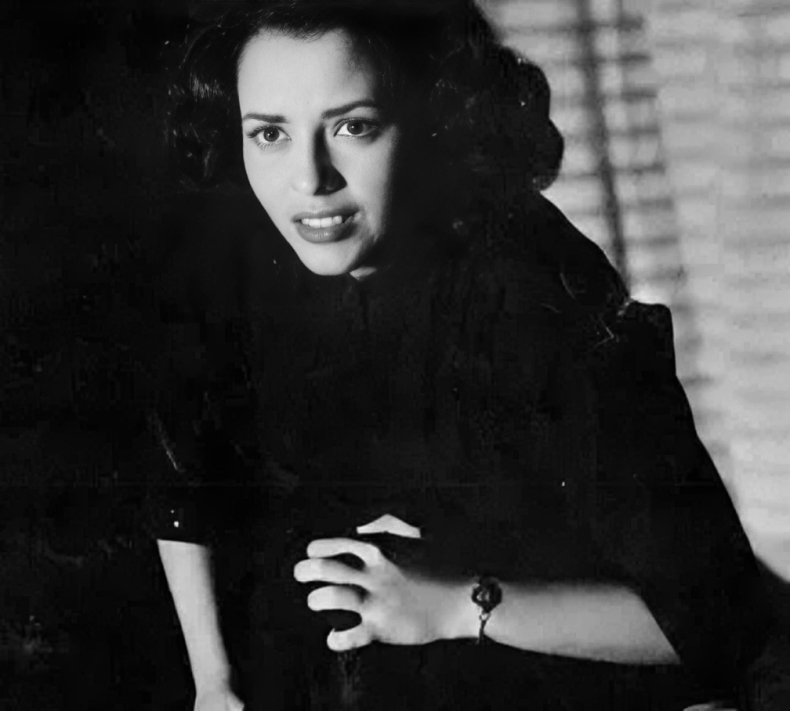
- Perla Aguiar in The Devil Is a Woman (1950)
- Born: Perla Fernández Aguiar; 30 June 1932; New York City, New York, U.S.
- Died: 9 October 2015 (aged 83); State of Mexico, Mexico
- Occupation: Actress
- Years active: 1946–1954

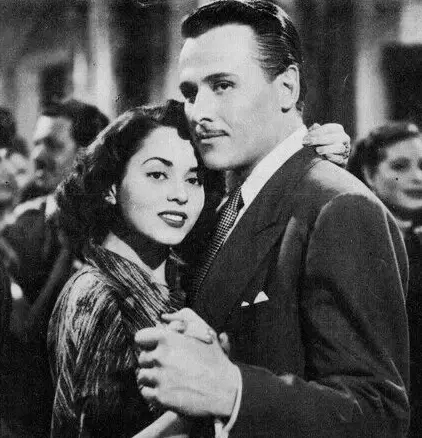
Perla Aguiar and Víctor Junco in The Devil Is a Woman (1950)

Perla Fernández Aguiar (30 June 1932 – 9 October 2015) was a Cuban actress best known for her roles in films during the Golden Age of Mexican cinema, such as The Genius (1948), The Devil Is a Woman (1950) and Chucho the Mended (1952).

Aguiar died at the State of Mexico on 9 October 2015, aged 83.

== Selected filmography ==
- Jalisco Fair (1948)
- The Genius (1948)
- Autumn and Spring (1949)
- The Devil Is a Woman (1950)
- El revoltoso (1951)
- Chucho the Mended (1952)
- Dona Mariquita of My Heart (1953)

== Bibliography ==
- Abad, Gracia. Quién es quién en el teatro y el cine español e hispanoamericano. Vol. 1. Centro de Investigaciones Literarias Españolas e Hispanoamericanas (CILEH), BPR Publishers, 1990. ISBN 978-8-4874-1100-7
- Aviña, Rafael. Aquí está su pachucote— ¡Noooo!: una biografía de Germán Valdés. Dirección General de Publicaciones, Consejo Nacional para la Cultura y las Artes, 2009. ISBN 978-6-0745-5139-6
- Pilcher, Jeffrey M. Cantinflas and the Chaos of Mexican Modernity. Rowman & Littlefield, 2001. ISBN 978-0-8420-2771-7
