= Tropical Delirium =

1952 film

- Directed by: Miguel Morayta
- Written by: Sidney T. Bruckner; Carlos Fernández Galán; Miguel Morayta
- Produced by: Sidney T. Bruckner
- Starring: Amalia Aguilar; Víctor Alcocer; Beatriz Ramos
- Cinematography: Ezequiel Carrasco
- Edited by: José W. Bustos
- Music by: Gabriel Ruiz; José de la Vega
- Production company: Producciones Espada
- Release date: 25 June 1952
- Running time: 80 minutes
- Country: Mexico
- Language: Spanish

Tropical Delirium (Spanish: Delirio Tropical) is a 1952 Mexican musical drama film directed by Miguel Morayta and starring Amalia Aguilar, Víctor Alcocer and Beatriz Ramos. It was part of the tradition of Rumberas films popular during the Golden Age of Mexican Cinema. It was shot at the Clasa Studios in Mexico City. The film's sets were designed by the art director Ramón Rodríguez Granada.

== Cast ==
- Amalia Aguilar as María Acosta
- Carlos Valadez as Carlos Madariaga
- Lupe Llaca as Paula García
- Víctor Alcocer as Manuel Morales
- Bertha Lomelí as Francisca
- Beatriz Ramos as Marta
- Conchita Gentil Arcos as Doña Esperanza
- Juan Pulido as Padre Juan
- Salvador Quiroz as Empresario
- Armando Velasco as Don Felipe
- Guillermo Calles as Mateo el brujo
- Ignacio Solorzano as Compadre de Manuel
- Miguel Ángel López as Tomás

== Bibliography ==
- Riera, Emilio García. Historia documental del cine mexicano: 1951-1952. Universidad de Guadalajara, 1992.
- Wilt, David E. The Mexican Filmography, 1916 through 2001. McFarland, 2024.
