= The Wolf Returns =

1952 film

- Directed by: Vicente Oroná
- Written by: Gilberto Gazcón; Adolfo Torres Portillo; Raúl de Anda
- Produced by: Raúl de Anda
- Starring: Dagoberto Rodríguez; Flor Silvestre; Rosa de Castilla
- Cinematography: Ignacio Torres
- Edited by: Carlos Savage
- Music by: Gustavo César Carrión
- Production company: Cinematográfica Jalisco
- Distributed by: Clasa-Mohme
- Release date: 24 July 1952
- Running time: 80 minutes
- Country: Mexico
- Language: Spanish

The Wolf Returns (Spanish: Vuelve el lobo) is a 1952 Mexican western adventure film directed by Vicente Oroná and starring Dagoberto Rodríguez, Flor Silvestre and Rosa de Castilla. The film's sets were designed by the art director Ramón Rodríguez Granada. It was last part of a trilogy of western films based in the character of El Lobo, including The Lone Wolf and The Justice of the Wolf.

== Cast ==
- Dagoberto Rodríguez as Jorge de Alba 'El Lobo'
- Flor Silvestre as Lupita Gutiérrez
- Tito Novaro as Rodrigo Hernández
- Federico Curiel as Pichirilo
- Rosa de Castilla as Marta de Alba
- Gloria Mange as Laura
- Aurora Walker as Nana
- José L. Murillo as Comisario
- Enrique del Castillo as Fernando Rojas

== Bibliography ==
- Riera, Emilio García. Historia documental del cine mexicano: 1951-1952. Universidad de Guadalajara, 1992.
- Wilt, David E. The Mexican Filmography, 1916 through 2001. McFarland, 2024.
