= The Justice of the Wolf =

1952 film

- Directed by: Vicente Oroná
- Written by: Gilberto Gazcón; Adolfo Torres Portillo; Carlos David Ortigosa
- Produced by: Raúl de Anda
- Starring: Dagoberto Rodríguez; Flor Silvestre; Rosa de Castilla
- Cinematography: Ignacio Torres
- Edited by: Carlos Savage
- Music by: Gustavo César Carrión
- Production company: Cinematográfica Jalisco
- Distributed by: Clasa-Mohme
- Release date: 12 June 1952
- Running time: 80 minutes
- Country: Mexico
- Language: Spanish

The Justice of the Wolf (Spanish: La justicia del lobo) is a 1952 Mexican western adventure film directed by Vicente Oroná and starring Dagoberto Rodríguez, Flor Silvestre and Rosa de Castilla. This film marked the film debut of Ana Bertha Lepe. It was shot at the Churubusco Studios in Mexico City. The film's sets were designed by the art director Ramón Rodríguez Granada. It was the second part of a trilogy of western films based in the character of El Lobo, including The Lone Wolf and The Wolf Returns.

== Cast ==
- Dagoberto Rodríguez as Jorge de Alba 'El Lobo'
- Flor Silvestre as Lupita Gutiérrez
- José María Linares-Rivas as Robles
- Federico Curiel as Pichirilo
- Rosa de Castilla as Marta de Alba
- Pepe del Río as Alfonso
- Aurora Walker as Nana
- José L. Murillo as Comisario
- Ana Bertha Lepe as Soledad
- Pascual García Peña as Juez
- Lupe Carriles as Mujer campesina

== Bibliography ==
- Riera, Emilio García. Historia documental del cine mexicano: 1951-1952. Universidad de Guadalajara, 1992.
- Wilt, David E. The Mexican Filmography, 1916 through 2001. McFarland, 2024.
