= Vejar, Trebnje =

Vejar
- Location in Slovenia
- Coordinates: 45°55′43.23″N 15°0′41.74″E
- Country: Slovenia
- Traditional region: Lower Carniola
- Statistical region: Southeast Slovenia
- Municipality: Trebnje

Area
  - Total: 0.2 km^{2} (0.077 sq mi)
- Elevation: 288.0 m (944.9 ft)

Population (2015)
  - Total: 255

Vejar (pronounced [ˈʋeːjaɾ]) is a settlement north of Trebnje in eastern Slovenia. Historically the area was part of Lower Carniola and the entire Municipality of Trebnje is now included in the Southeast Slovenia Statistical Region.

== History ==
Vejar became a separate settlement in 2014, when it was administratively separated from Hudeje. It is a Roma settlement. As a hamlet of Hudeje, it was previously known as V blatih.
