= Ana Bertha Lepe =

Mexican actress and model

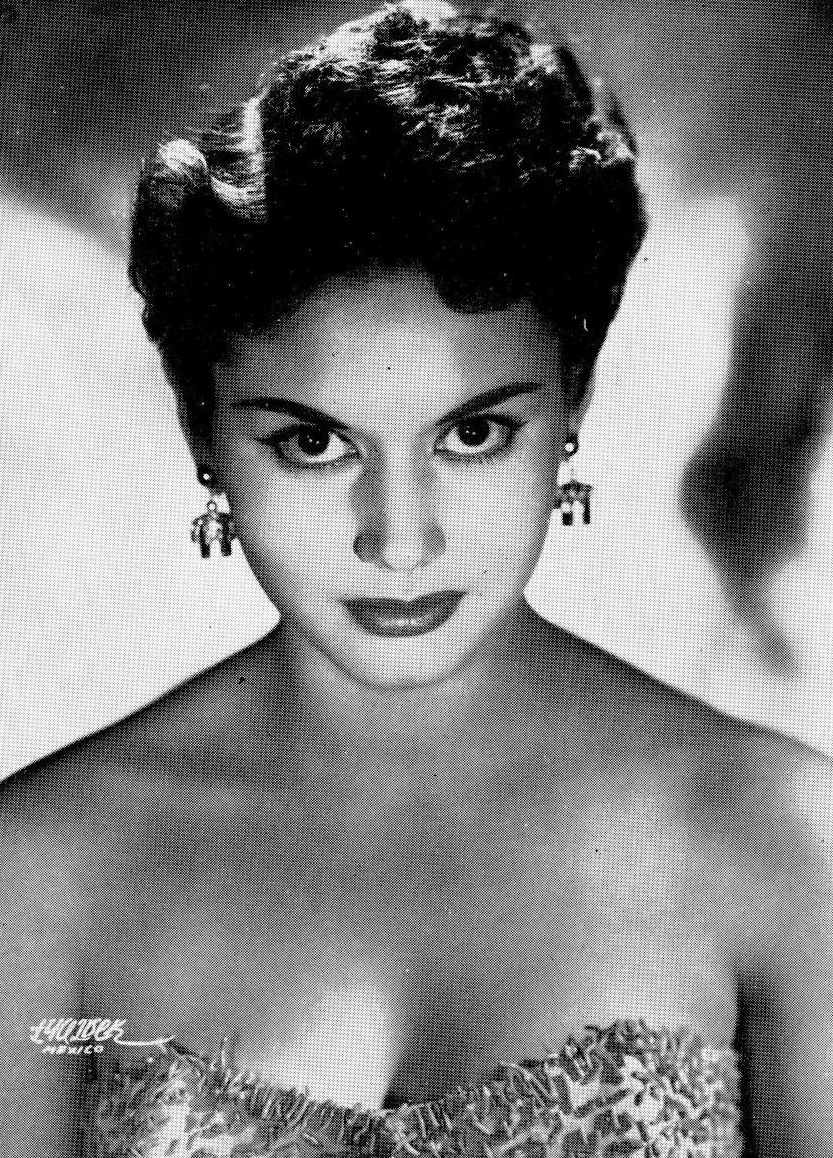
- Lepe in 1954
- Born: Ana Bertha Lepe Jiménez; 12 September 1934; Tecolotlán, Jalisco, Mexico
- Died: 24 October 2013 (aged 79); Mexico City, Mexico
- Occupations: Actress, Model
- Title: Miss México 1953

Ana Bertha Lepe Jiménez (Spanish pronunciation: [ˈana ˈβeɾta ˈlepe]; 12 September 1934 – 24 October 2013) was a Mexican actress and beauty pageant titleholder. In 1953 she was crowned Miss México and the third runner-up at the Miss Universe 1953.

== Career ==
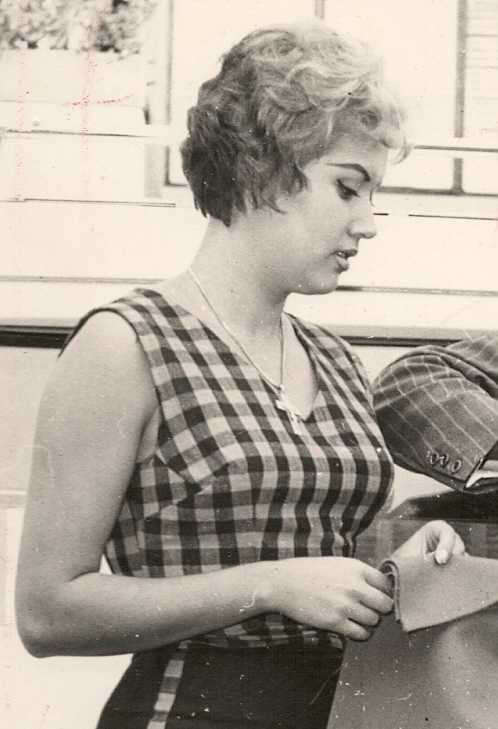
Lepe in January 1959

She made her film debut in La justicia del lobo (1952) her first of many films. Lepe then won the Miss Mexico contest before becoming the first Mexican contestant to finish in the top 5 of the Miss Universe pageant in 1953. In 1955, she starred in the Cuban film, Una gallega en La Habana. In 1959, she participated in Señoritas with Christiane Martel. She is internationally known for her starring role as Gamma in La nave de los monstruos (1960), a classic science fiction comedy co-starring Eulalio González "Piporro" and Lorena Velázquez. In 1960, Lepe's father shot and killed her fiancé, actor Agustín de Anda and she disappeared from show business for several years. In 1977, she acted in the first of many telenovelas, Pacto de amor.

== Personal life ==
Her personal life was marked by tragedy, notably in 1960 when her father shot and killed her fiancé, actor Agustín de Anda, causing her to withdraw from show business

== Death ==
Ana Bertha Lepe died on October 24, 2013. At the age of 79, in a hospital in Mexico City. Her death was caused by complications arising from surgery to repair an abdominal hernia, following a period of declining health since 2006, which included issues with alcoholism.

== Selected filmography ==
- The Justice of the Wolf (1952)
- The Spot of the Family (1953)
- The Viscount of Monte Cristo (1954)
- Kid Tabaco (1955)
- Look What Happened to Samson (1955)
- ¡Paso a la juventud..! (1958)
- La Feria de San Marcos (1958)
- Where Are Our Children Going? (1958)
- La nave de los monstruos (1960)
- A Girl from Chicago (1960)
- Rebel Without a House (1960)
- Los valientes no mueren (1962)
- Tin-Tan El Hombre Mono (1963)
- El tesoro del Rey Salomon (1964)
- Mundo de juguete (TV) (1974)
- El patrullero 777 (1978)
- Sentimientos Ajenos (TV) (1996)
- Ángela (TV) (1998)
