= Ramón Peón =

Cuban actor, screenwriter and film director

- Born: 5 June 1897; Havana, Cuba
- Died: 2 February 1971 (aged 73); San Juan, Puerto Rico
- Occupations: Actor, director, screenwriter, editor, producer
- Years active: 1920 - 1967 (film)

Ramón Peón (1897–1971) was a Cuban actor, screenwriter and film director. He also produced and edited some of his films.

== Selected filmography ==
- Dios Existe (1920)
- El veneno de un beso (1929)
- Road of Hell (1931)
- Sanctuary (1933)
- La Llorona (1933)
- Heroic Silence (1935)
- Women of Today (1936)
- A Dangerous Adventure (1939)
- Rocambole (1946)
- Arsène Lupin (1947)
- You Have the Eyes of a Deadly Woman (1947)
- Opium (1949)
- The Fallen Angel (1949)

== Bibliography ==
- Joanne Hershfield & David R. Maciel. Mexico's Cinema: A Century of Film and Filmmakers. Rowman & Littlefield, 1999.
