= Ramón Pereda =

Spanish actor (1897–1986)

- Born: 30 August 1897; Santander, Spain
- Died: 19 June 1986 (aged 88); Mexico City, Mexico
- Other name: Ramón Pereda Saro
- Occupations: Actor, Director, Producer, Writer
- Years active: 1927–1972 (film)
- Spouse(s): María Antonieta Pons, Adriana Lamar

Marcelo Ramón Pereda Saro (30 August 1897 – 19 June 1986) was a Spanish-Mexican actor, screenwriter, film producer and film director. He was married to the actresses María Antonieta Pons and Adriana Lamar. He appeared in the 1930 Spanish-language version of the revue film Paramount on Parade.

== Selected filmography ==
=== Actor ===
- Resurrection (1931)
- Contrabando (1931)
- Carne de Cabaret (1931)
- Sanctuary (1933)
- The Crying Woman (1933)
- Women of Today (1936)
- Beautiful Mexico (1938)
- The Hawk (1940)
- Arsène Lupin (1947)
- You Have the Eyes of a Deadly Woman (1947)
- Romance en Puerto Rico (1962)

=== Director ===
- María Cristina (1951)
- It Happened in Mexico (1958)

== Bibliography ==
- Rogelio Agrasánchez. Guillermo Calles: A Biography of the Actor and Mexican Cinema Pioneer. McFarland, 2010.
