= Víctor Parra =

Mexican actor and producer (1920–1994)

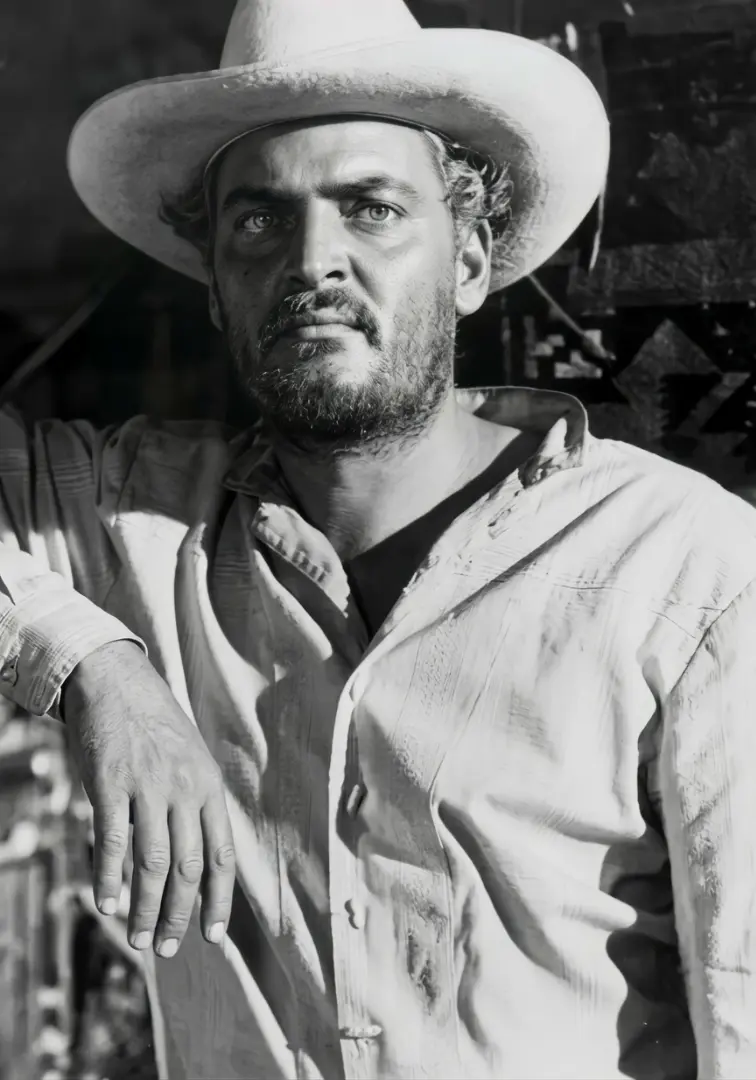
- Víctor Parra in Sombra verde (1954)
- Born: Víctor Parra Reyes; 10 January 1920; Atotonilco de Tula, Hidalgo, Mexico
- Died: 20 February 1994 (aged 74); Mexico City, Mexico
- Education: School of Philosophy and Literature (UNAM)
- Occupations: Actor & Producer
- Years active: 1944–1968

Víctor Parra Reyes (10 January 1920 – 20 February 1994) was a Mexican actor and producer. During his career, he won three Ariel Awards.

== Selected filmography ==
=== As an actor ===
- Champion Without a Crown (1946)
- Sucedió en Jalisco (1947)
- El cuarto mandamiento (1948)
- Corner Stop (1948)
- Yo maté a Juan Charrasqueado (1949)
- Angels of the Arrabal (1949)
- Cuatro contra el mundo (1950)
- El suavecito (1951)
- The Minister's Daughter (1952)
- Los dineros del diablo (1953)
- Northern Border (1953)
- Reportaje (1953)
- Untouched (1954)
- Los Fernández de Peralvillo (1954)
- Espaldas mojadas (1955)
- El Túnel 6 (1955)
- Morir de pie (1957)
- El jinete negro (1958)
- Herencia trágica (1960)
- El Asaltacaminos (1962)
- La Muerte en el desfiladero (1963)

=== As a producer ===
- Secuestro diabólico (1957)
- Furias desatadas (1957)
- Los Tigres del ring (1960)
- El Torneo de la muerte (1960)

== Awards and nominations ==
Year	Award	Category	Nominated work	Result
1949	Ariel Awards	Best Supporting Actor	El muchacho alegre	Won
1950	Ariel Awards	Best Supporting Actor	Angels of the Arrabal	Won
1955	Ariel Awards	Best Actor	Los Fernández de Peralvillo	Won
