= The Lone Wolf (1952 film) =

1952 film

- Directed by: Vicente Oroná
- Written by: Gilberto Gazcón; Adolfo Torres Portillo; Carlos David Ortigosa; Raúl de Anda
- Produced by: Raúl de Anda
- Starring: Dagoberto Rodríguez; Flor Silvestre; Rosa de Castilla
- Cinematography: Ignacio Torres
- Edited by: Carlos Savage
- Music by: Gustavo César Carrión
- Production company: Cinematográfica Jalisco
- Distributed by: Clasa-Mohme
- Release date: 17 January 1952
- Running time: 90 minutes
- Country: Mexico
- Language: Spanish

The Lone Wolf (Spanish: El lobo solitario) is a 1952 Mexican western adventure film directed by Vicente Oroná and starring Dagoberto Rodríguez, Flor Silvestre and Rosa de Castilla. It was shot at the Churubusco Studios in Mexico City. The film's sets were designed by the art director Ramón Rodríguez Granada. It was the first part of a trilogy of western films based in the character of El Lobo, including The Justice of the Wolf and The Wolf Returns.

== Cast ==
- Dagoberto Rodríguez as Jorge de Alba 'El Lobo'
- Flor Silvestre as Lupita Gutiérrez
- Arturo Martínez as Juan Aparicio
- Rosa de Castilla as Marta de Alba
- Federico Curiel as Pichirilo
- Aurora Walker as Nana
- Ángel Infante as Raymundo
- Jorge Arriaga as Lencho
- Salvador Quiroz as Don Jorge
- Nora Veryán as La Prieta
- José L. Murillo as Comisario

== Bibliography ==
- Riera, Emilio García. Historia documental del cine mexicano: 1951-1952. Universidad de Guadalajara, 1992.
- Wilt, David E. The Mexican Filmography, 1916 through 2001. McFarland, 2024.
