= Rosita Quintana =

Mexican actress (1925–2021)

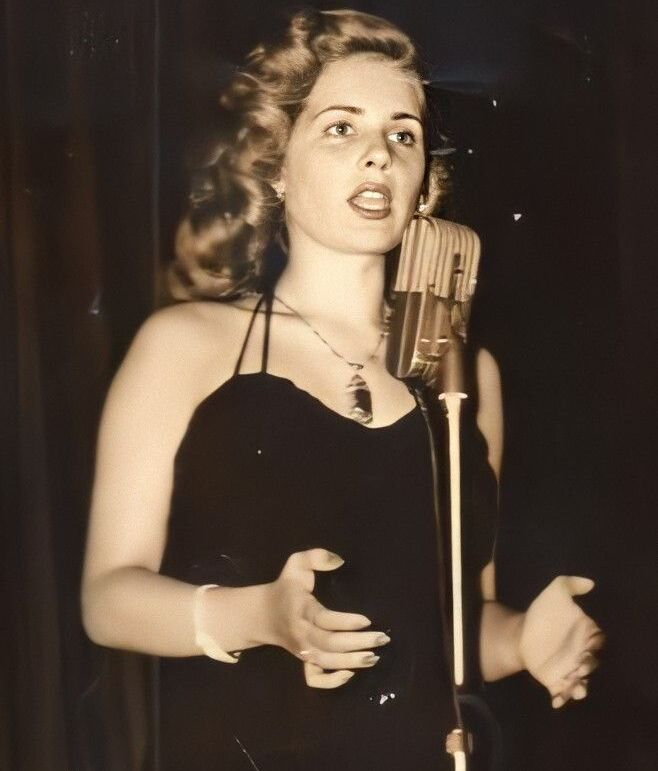
- Quintana performing in 1957
- Born: Trinidad Rosa Quintana Muñoz; 16 July 1925; Buenos Aires, Argentina
- Died: 23 August 2021 (aged 96); Mexico City, Mexico
- Years active: 1948–2021
- Spouse: Sergio Kogan
- Children: 2 (one adoptive daughter)

Trinida Rosa Quintana Muñoz (16 July 1925 – 23 August 2021), known as Rosita Quintana, was an Argentine-Mexican actress, singer and songwriter. She was one of the top leading ladies of the Golden Age of Mexican cinema. She starred in Luis Buñuel's Susana (1951) and musical films such as Serenata en México (1956) and Cuando México canta (1958). Her performances earned her acting awards from Mexico, Argentina, Russia, and Spain. In 2016, she received the Mexican Academy of Film Arts and Sciences' Golden Ariel Award for career achievement.

== Life and career ==
Quintana was born Trinidad Rosa Quintana Muñoz in the Saavedra neighborhood of Buenos Aires, Argentina. Her parents enrolled her in the conservatory of brothers Emilio and José De Caro, where she studied singing and acting.

In 1942, she debuted as a tango vocalist at the Café Nacional in Buenos Aires. She performed in a revue by Carlos A. Petit and Rodolfo Sciammarella at the Teatro Casino, and in 1946, she began a tour of Chile and Bolivia. In Mexico, she signed a contract to perform for a month at El Patio, Mexico City's top nightclub. She made her first record, "Bonita", in 1949.

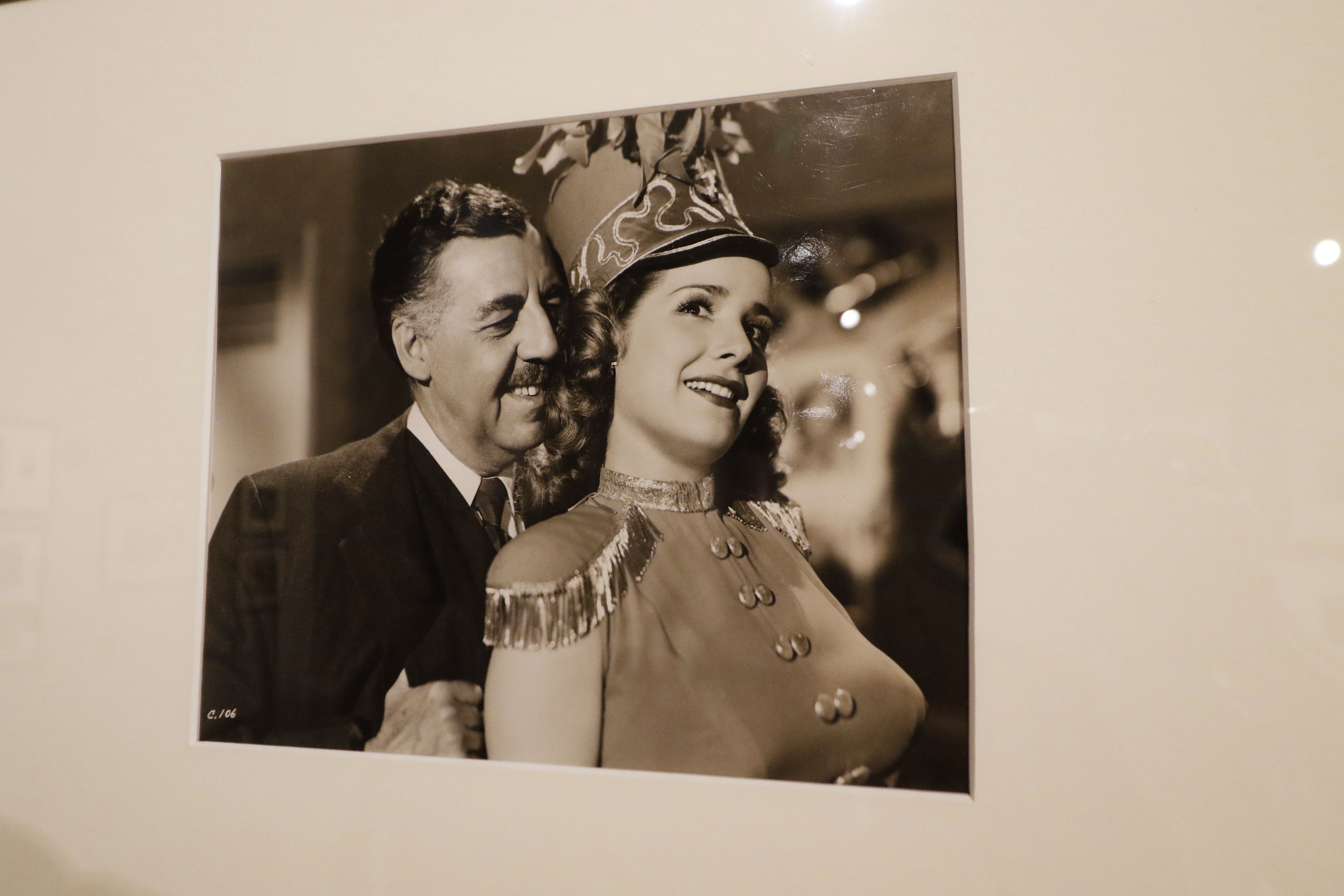
Quintana with Fernando Soler in Mi querido capitán (1950)

Quintana is remembered for her participation in numerous Mexican films between 1948-1960. She starred in movies like Calabacitas Tiernas (1949); Susana (1951); El Mil Amores (1954), and many others. In 2005, she returned to films with Club Eutanasia. As a singer, she is remembered in notable tangos and boleros, such as "Bendita mentira".

== Personal life ==
Quintana married Mexican film director and producer Sergio Kogan. They had a son, Nicolás, and an adopted daughter, Paloma. In 2016, she described Kogan as "a great man".

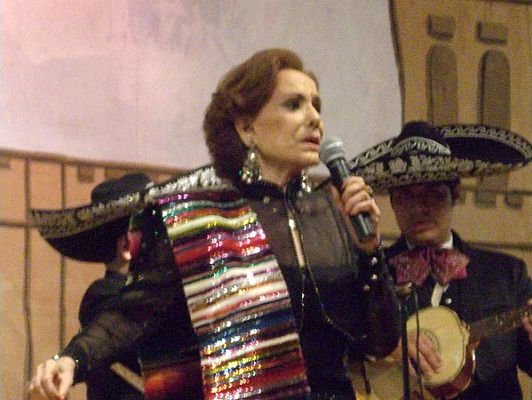
Quintana performing at New York in 2007

In 2001, Quintana announced her intention to write her autobiography, La otra verdad. She said: "I am surprised by the number of people I met, like Libertad Lamarque or Jorge Negrete, and I want all that to be in a book that I am trying to piece together little by little". However, in 2016, she wrote a newspaper article that says: "I once thought about writing my memoirs, but I never did. You know my life as an actress. My personal life is mine".

== Death ==
Quintana died in Mexico City on 23 August 2021, after undergoing surgery to remove a tumor in her thyroid. She was 96.

== Selected filmography ==
- The Last Night (1948)
- Tender Pumpkins (1949)
- Rough But Respectable (1949)
- The Fallen Angel (1949)
- Yo quiero ser tonta (1950)
- Susana (1951)
- Sister Alegría (1952)
- Women Who Work (1953)
- El mil amores (1954)
- The Price of Living (1954)
- To the Four Winds (1955)
- Serenata en México (1956)
- ¡Cielito Lindo! (1957)
- Cuando México canta (1958)
- Club eutanasia (2005)

== Television ==
- La intrusa (1987)
- Atrapada (1991)
- La Dueña (1995)
- El secreto de Alejandra (1997)
- Rencor apasionado (1998)
- Abrázame muy fuerte (2000)
- Peregrina (2005)

== Discography ==
=== Studio albums ===
- Música de la película Cuando México canta (Musart)
- Canciones festivas con Rosita Quintana (Musart)
- Rosita y Rosita (RCA Victor)
- Siempre se vuelve al primer amor... (Odeon)

== Bibliography ==
- Agrasánchez Jr., Rogelio (2001). Bellezas del cine mexicano/Beauties of Mexican Cinema. Archivo Fílmico Agrasánchez. ISBN 968-5077-11-8.
