= Edmundo Espino =

Mexican actor

- Born: July 19, 1894; Mazapil, Zacatecas, Mexico
- Died: December 24, 1964 (aged 70); Mexico City, Mexico
- Occupation: Actor
- Years active: 1941–1964 (film)

Edmundo Espino (July 19, 1894 – December 24, 1964) was a Mexican film actor.

== Selected filmography ==
Year	Title	Role	Notes
1944	The Escape	Campesino	
1945	Adultery	Alcalde	
1947	The Tiger of Jalisco	Señor juez	
1947	Fly Away, Young Man!	Redactor de periódico	Uncredited
1948	The Genius	Doctor	
1949	Hypocrite	Juanito	
1950	The Two Orphans	Boticario	
1950	Over the Waves	Himself	

== Bibliography ==
- Rogelio Agrasánchez. Guillermo Calles: A Biography of the Actor and Mexican Cinema Pioneer. McFarland, 2010.
