= Federico Curiel =

- Born: 19 February 1917; Monterrey, Nuevo León, Mexico
- Died: 17 June 1985 (aged 68); Cuernavaca, Mexico
- Education: University of Guadalajara
- Occupations: Actor, writer, director

Federico Curiel (19 February 1917 – 17 June 1985) was a Mexican filmmaker, writer and actor during the Golden Age of Mexican cinema.

Curiel was born in Monterrey, Mexico, he moved to Guadalajara, Jalisco as a child and attended the University of Guadalajara.

== Selected filmography ==
- The Lone Wolf (1952)
- The Justice of the Wolf (1952)
- The Wolf Returns (1952)
- The Curse of Nostradamus (1960)
- The Blood of Nostradamus (1960)
- Los autómatas de la muerte (1962) a.k.a. Neutron vs the Death Robots
- Cazadores de cabezas (1962) a.k.a. Santo in The Headhunters
- The Mummies of Guanajuato (1972)
