= Agustín de Anda =

Mexican actor (1933–1960)

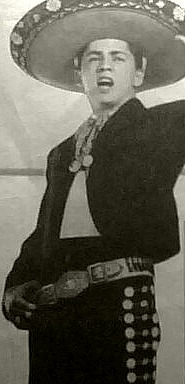
- Born: 13 August 1933; Mexico City, Mexico
- Died: 29 May 1960 (aged 26)
- Cause of death: Murder
- Known for: Acting
- Father: Raúl de Anda

Agustín de Anda (13 August 1933 – 29 May 1960) was a Mexican actor and one of the sons of actor and producer Raúl de Anda.

== Biography and career ==
de Anda was born on 13 August 1933, in Mexico City, the eldest of Raul de Anda's five sons. He launched his career with small roles in his father's films. His starring debut was in 1956 in the film "Bataclán mexicano'' alongside former Miss Universe Christiane Martel. In 1958, he worked in the movie "Los Desarraigados", a film based on the play of the same name by author José Humberto Robles. In 1959, he starred in "Remolino'' alongside Luis Aguilar and José Elias Moreno. At the beginning of 1960, he starred alongside Pedro Armendariz and Sonia Furio in "La cárcel de Cananea'', a film for which he won the award for Best Male Performance at the IX International Film Festival of San Sebastian in 1961.

== Murder ==
On the night of 29 May 1960, de Anda accompanied his girlfriend Ana Bertha Lepe to the cabaret "La Fuente'' located in Insurgentes Sur, where the actress was presenting her show. Le[e went to her dressing room and de Anda to a table where Guillermo Lepe, his girlfriend's father, was already seated. They began to talk but soon after they got into a heated argument before separating. Soon after, Lepe fatally shot De Anda on the stairs of the cabaret. After Agustín's murder, Ana Bertha Lepe's career was severely affected; as she suffered a boycott led by her late boyfriend's father Raúl de Anda, which was joined by all the film producers, and she was no longer given work.

== Filmography ==
- Frontera norte (1953)
- El diablo a caballo (1955)
- La venganza del Diablo (1955)
- Enemigos (Los valientes de Jalisco) (1956)
- Bataclán mexicano (1956)
- Las manzanas de Dorotea (1957)
- La máscara de carne (1958)
- Quietos todos (1959)
- Estampida (1959)
- Los desarraigados (1960)
- La cárcel de Cananea (1960)
- Remolino (1961)
