= Carlos Véjar hijo =

Mexican director and writer

- Born: 28 December 1906; Colimba, Mexico
- Died: 27 September 1994 (aged 87); Mexico City, Mexico
- Occupations: Director, Writer
- Years active: 1933–1955 (film)

Carlos Véjar hijo (1906–1994) was a Mexican film director and screenwriter. He was active during the Golden Age of Mexican Cinema.

== Selected filmography ==
- Dos tenorios de barrio (1949)
- Veracruz Passion (1950)
- Monte de piedad (1951)
- Nobody's Children (1952)
- Tres hombres en mi vida (1952)
- The Sword of Granada (1953)
- Solamente una vez (1954)

== Bibliography ==
- Navitski, Rielle & Poppe, Nicolas (ed.) Cosmopolitan Film Cultures in Latin America, 1896–1960. Indiana University Press, 2017.
- Riera, Emilio García . Historia documental del cine mexicano: 1941. Ediciones Era, 1969.
