= Dagoberto Rodríguez =

Mexican actor (1916–1974)

- Born: May 15, 1912; Calvillo, Aguascalientes, Mexico
- Died: March 16, 1974 (aged 61); Mexico City, Mexico
- Other name: Dagoberto Rodríguez Delgado
- Occupation: Actor
- Years active: 1944–1974 (film)

Dagoberto Rodríguez (1912–1974) was a Mexican film actor.

== Selected filmography ==
- Witch's Corner (1949)
- Treacherous (1950)
- In the Flesh (1951)
- The Lone Wolf (1952)
- The Justice of the Wolf (1952)
- Nobody's Children (1952)
- The Wolf Returns (1952)
- The Player (1953)
- The Bandits of Cold River (1956)
- Black Skull (1960)
- Romance in Puerto Rico (1962)

== Bibliography ==
- Joaquín Garcia. Historia del Cine Puertorriqueo. Palibrio, 2014.
