= The Hidden One =

1956 film

- Directed by: Roberto Gavaldón
- Written by: Roberto Gavaldón; Gunther Gerzso; Miguel N. Lira; José Revueltas
- Produced by: Samuel Alazraki
- Starring: María Félix; Pedro Armendáriz
- Cinematography: Gabriel Figueroa
- Edited by: Jorge Bustos
- Music by: Raúl Lavista
- Release date: 18 July 1956
- Running time: 100 minutes
- Country: Mexico
- Language: Spanish

The Hidden One (Spanish: La escondida) is a 1956 Mexican drama film directed by Roberto Gavaldón. It was entered into the 1956 Cannes Film Festival.

== Cast ==
- María Félix - Gabriela
- Pedro Armendáriz - Felipe Rojano
- Andrés Soler - General Nemesio Garza
- Arturo Martínez - Don Cosme
- Domingo Soler - Tata Agustino Rojano
- Jorge Martínez de Hoyos - Máximo Tepal
- Carlos Agostí - Octavio Montero
- Sara Guasch - Hortensia
- Miguel Manzano - Don Chente
- Carlos Riquelme - Doctor Herrerías
- Eduardo Alcaraz - Señor Ariza
- Rafael Alcayde - Ranch Master (as Rafael Alcaide)
- Alfredo Wally Barrón - Don Ventura (uncredited)
- Lupe Carriles - Woman in mourning (uncredited)
- Arturo Castro - Train conductor (uncredited)
- José Chávez - Train employee (uncredited)
- Alicia del Lago - Woman who throws stone at Gabriela (uncredited)
- Manuel Dondé - One-Eyed Man (uncredited)
- Lidia Franco - Gossipy woman in window (uncredited)
- Emilio Garibay - Capitain (uncredited)
- Elodia Hernández - Gossipy woman in window (uncredited)
- Héctor Mateos - Court of Justice Chief (uncredited)
- Raúl Meraz - Capitain Romero (uncredited)
- Inés Murillo - Maid of Doctor (uncredited)
- Manuel Sánchez Navarro - Deputy (uncredited)
- Cuco Sánchez - Singer (uncredited)
- Hernán Vera - Sales Collector (uncredited)
- Nora Veryán - Woman who sells mead to Gabriela (uncredited)
