= If I Were a Congressman =

1952 film

- Directed by: Miguel M. Delgado
- Written by: Mario Moreno «Cantinflas»; Carlos León; Jaime Salvador
- Produced by: Jacques Gelman
- Starring: Mario Moreno «Cantinflas»; Gloria Mange; Andrés Soler
- Cinematography: José Ortiz Ramos
- Edited by: Jorge Busto
- Music by: Raúl Lavista
- Production company: Posa Films
- Distributed by: Columbia Pictures
- Release date: 30 January 1952
- Running time: 95 minutes
- Country: Mexico
- Language: Spanish

If I Were a Congressman (Spanish: Si yo fuera diputado) is a 1952 Mexican political satire comedy film directed by Miguel M. Delgado and starring Mario Moreno «Cantinflas», Gloria Mange and Andrés Soler.

The film's art direction was by Gunther Gerszo.

== Plot ==
Cantinflas is poor barber who struggles at his job. He burns a customer, misunderstands a mother's directions and shaves her daughter bald, but has a keen ability to recall obscure clauses and codes in Mexican Law and civil ordinance which he applies to numerous situations he encounters in his daily life.

While he is giving a haircut to the Diputado (local Congressional representative), Don Procuro, he overhears an altercation between a single mother with children and lawyers who have come to evict them because of overdue rent payments. They are taking her belongings out of the house. He successfully defends the mother, claiming that the warrant they are acting on does not give them permission to do so, and they leave.

His "uncle" Juan, a lawyer, is aging and seeks a replacement in his craft. He takes an interest in Cantinflas and talks to him about a case he is working on where a woman was wrongfully accused of murdering her husband. In court, Cantinflas' charisma appeals to both the jury and the accused woman. He successfully argues that the woman could not be guilty because the killer was left-handed.

Reading about the case's success in the newspaper, an old man tracks down his barbershop. Under the guise of giving his dog a haircut, he explains that he suspects his much younger wife, an opera singer, is having an affair with her orchestra conductor. The two devise a plan for him to sneak into their next concert and spy on the conductor to gather evidence for an adultery trial.

Cantinflas rents a suit and top hat to pose as a musician. At the concert, he is stopped at the backstage entrance by a watchful guard. He distracts the guard long enough to sneak in, but is chased throughout the area.

He walks in on the man's daughter and the conductor beginning to kiss, but suddenly cannot find the legal notification papers and instead locks them in their rehearsal room as he escapes the guards. Running through the backstage area, he ends up on stage right when the concert was supposed to be starting and the conductor supposed to be arriving. He is instead mistaken by the public for the conductor; he cannot escape as the security guards have lined up on both sides.

Being an avid classical music enjoyer as well as a mandolin player, Cantinflas (to his own surprise) is able to conduct all the songs in the program perfectly. At the end, the crowd (including the guards who were supposed to arrest him) give him a standing ovation.

Juan and his friends have bigger aspirations for him. They want to elect him to be the next Diputado, as he has already become a folk hero and gained substantial popularity among the public. Cantinflas takes a high-interest loan to upgrade his barbershop's equipment, yet is still unable to provide good service.

At a local town hall, both Procuro and Cantinflas give speeches. The entire hall applauds and cheers Cantinflas, while only Procuro's own bodyguards and goons applaud his. Procuro's goons resort to sabotage, framing his campaign for illegal advertising and plotting out voter fraud.

Due to unpaid debts, most of Cantinflas' barbershop's gear is repossessed. He is later arrested for the advertising he was framed for, only for Juan's daughter to post bail and set him free. Juan gives a speech asking the people for money, and they quickly crowdfund his release. At the polling place, everyone is voting for Cantinflas, and an attempt by Proculo's goons to dump the ballot box is thwarted by a crowd of Cantinflas's supporters.

Cantinflas wins the election by a landslide and gives a victory speech pledging to be an honest congressman and listen to the desires of his constituents.

== Cast ==
- Mario Moreno as Cantinflas
- Gloria Mange as Sarita
- Andrés Soler as Don Juan
- Emperatriz Carvajal as Lucía
- Alejandro Ciangherotti as Juliano Fraschetti
- Ernesto Finance as Don Proculo L. de Guevara
- Rafael Icardo as Don Melquiades
- Eduardo Alcaraz as Doctor
- María Cristina Lesser as Fátima, acusada de asesinato
- Edmundo Espino
- Armando Velasco as Agente del ministerio público
- Gregorio Acosta as Empleado del teatro (uncredited)
- Ricardo Adalid as Empleado del teatro (uncredited)
- Víctor Alcocer as Martín Sánchez (uncredited)
- Armando Arriola as Abogado en derecho (uncredited)
- Daniel Arroyo as Miembro del jurado (uncredited)
- Stephen Berne as Espectador (uncredited)
- Lupe Carriles as Mujer de vecindad (uncredited)
- Alberto Catalá as Señor González (uncredited)
- Pedro Elviro as Amigo de Cantinflas (uncredited)
- José Escanero as Amigo de Cantinflas (uncredited)
- Jesús Gómez as Policía (uncredited)
- Regino Herrera as Cargador (uncredited)
- Carmen Manzano as Madre de la pelona (uncredited)
- Roberto Meyer as Comisario (uncredited)
- Bruno Márquez as Violinista (uncredited)
- José Ortiz de Zárate as Juez (no acreditaddo)
- José Pardavé as Cliente de Cantinflas (uncredited)
- Ignacio Peón (uncredited)
- Salvador Quiroz as Farmacéutico (uncredited)
- Humberto Rodríguez as Don Remigio (uncredited)
- Félix Samper as Cliente de Sarita (uncredited)
- Alfredo Varela padre as Amigo de Cantinflas (uncredited)

== Bibliography ==
- Eric Zolov. Iconic Mexico: An Encyclopedia from Acapulco to Zócalo. ABC-CLIO, 2015.
