= Lavat =

Lavat is a surname. It may refer to:

- Adriana Lavat (born 1974), Mexican actress and television host
- Jorge Lavat (1933−2011), Mexican film and television actor
- José Lavat (1948–2018), Mexican voice actor
- Queta Lavat (born 1929), Mexican film and television actress
