= Drop the Curtain =

1955 film

- Home video poster
- Directed by: Miguel M. Delgado
- Written by: Jaime Salvador
- Produced by: Jacques Gelman
- Starring: Mario Moreno «Cantinflas»; Christiane Martel; Beatriz Saavedra
- Cinematography: Víctor Herrera
- Edited by: Jorge Bustos
- Music by: Federico Ruiz
- Production company: Posa Films
- Distributed by: Columbia Films
- Release date: 31 August 1955
- Running time: 106 minutes
- Country: Mexico
- Language: Spanish

Drop the Curtain (Spanish: Abajo el telón) is a 1955 Mexican comedy film directed by Miguel M. Delgado and starring Mario Moreno «Cantinflas», Christiane Martel and Beatriz Saavedra. The film's art direction was by Gunther Gerszo.

== Plot ==
A man (Cantinflas) who works as a window cleaner in the city is eventually presented with the opportunity to clean the windows of a famous French actress, Lulu Duval (Christiane Martel), who is starring in a musical revue in an important theater. The actress's agent Julián (Alejandro Ciangherotti) steals her most precious jewel, a very valuable necklace, and the window cleaner is unjustly accused because he was cleaning the windows at the time, though the assistant and confidant of the famous actress, Anita (Beatriz Saavedra) believes in his innocence.

The thief negotiates the necklace with the head of a criminal band that strikes the city (Rafael Alcayde). The Police Commissioner (Víctor Alcocer) convinces the window cleaner to serve as a spy against the band in exchange for his freedom. The window cleaner accepts, and is infiltrated as an employee of the theater where the famous actress and her agent are. In the theater, the window cleaner is pursued in many occasions by several members of the band of jewel thieves who want to kill him, because they suspect he works for the police, and theater workers, who chase him for the mischief and difficulties he originates in the work at the theater.

== Cast ==
- Mario Moreno as Cantinflas
- Christiane Martel as Lulu Duval
- Beatriz Saavedra as Anita
- Alberto Catalá as Asistente de Cantinflas
- Víctor Alcocer as Comandante
- Tito Novaro as Actor en teatro
- María Herrero as Secretaria
- Alejandro Ciangherotti as Julián
- Rafael Alcayde as Jefe de la banda criminal (as Rafael Alcaide)
- Miguel Manzano as Peralta
- Ernesto Finance as Empleado del teatro
- Ketty Clavijo as Bailaora (as Kety Clavijo)
- José Luis Aguirre "Trotsky" as Bailarín delicadote (uncredited)
- Eduardo Alcaraz as Artista en teatro (uncredited)
- Jorge Arriaga as Detective de policía (uncredited)
- Armando Arriola as Empleado del teatro (uncredited)
- Magdaleno Barba as Empleado teatro (uncredited)
- León Barroso as Obdulio (uncredited)
- Antonio Bravo as Señor director de empresa (uncredited)
- Manuel Casanueva as Empleado de casa de juegos (uncredited)
- Nacho Contla as Don Cástulo, empresario (uncredited)
- María Luisa Cortés as Clienta de casa de juegos (uncredited)
- Julio Daneri as Conductor de música del teatro (uncredited)
- Ángel Di Stefani as Empleado del teatro (uncredited)
- Manuel Dondé as Detective de policía (uncredited)
- Guillermo Hernández as Asesino miembro de la banda (uncredited)
- Velia Lupercio as Espectadora en teatro (uncredited)
- Lucrecia Muñoz as Clienta de casa de juegos (uncredited)
- Rubén Márquez as Cliente de casa de juegos (uncredited)
- Pepe Nava as Actor en escena (uncredited)
- Óscar Ortiz de Pinedo as Fritz (uncredited)
- Carlos Robles Gil as Espectador en teatro (uncredited)
- Humberto Rodríguez as Pedro (uncredited)
- Ángela Rodríguez as Espectadora en teatro (uncredited)
- Alfonso Torres as Empleado de casa de juegos (uncredited)
- Rafael Torres as Agente de policía (uncredited)
- María Valdealde as Espectadora teatro (uncredited)
- Christa von Humboldt as Rubia en casa de juegos (uncredited)

== Bibliography ==
- Crespo, Miguel Angel. Crónica Cinematográfica: Una Historia de Cine... Miguel Angel Crespo, 2013.
- Amador, María Luisa. Cartelera cinematográfica, 1950-1959. Centro Universitario de Estudios Cinematográfico, Dirección General de Difusión Cultural, Dirección Editorial, UNAM, 1985.
- Lezcano, José Alberto. El actor de cine: arte, mito y realidad. Instituto Cubano de Arte e Industria Cinematográficos, 2009.
