= The Doorman (1950 film) =

1950 film by Miguel M. Delgado

- Directed by: Miguel M. Delgado
- Written by: Miguel M. Delgado; Carlos León; Jaime Salvador; M. de Los Angeles
- Starring: Mario Moreno «Cantinflas» Silvia Pinal; Josefina del Mar
- Cinematography: Raúl Martínez Solares
- Edited by: Jorge Bustos
- Music by: Gonzalo Curiel
- Production company: Posa Films
- Distributed by: Columbia Films
- Release date: 3 May 1950
- Running time: 113 minutes
- Country: Mexico
- Language: Spanish

The Doorman (Spanish: El portero), also known as Puerta, joven (Spanish: Door, Young Man or The Door, Please), is a 1950 Mexican comedy film directed by Miguel M. Delgado and starring Mario Moreno «Cantinflas», Silvia Pinal and Josefina del Mar. It was shot at the Churubusco Studios in Mexico City. The film's sets were designed by the art director Gunther Gerszo.

== Plot ==
The portero or doorman of a humble neighborhood (Cantinflas) also writes letters to his neighbors for extra money. He falls in love with his beautiful neighbor, Rosita (Pinal), who cannot walk, while a young military man is also in love with the girl. The doorman wants his neighbor to be happy, so he writes letters to her, but signing as her military admirer. Meanwhile, the doorman has a plan for her to walk again, by earning money at the horse races to pay for her operation.

== Cast ==
- Mario Moreno as Cantinflas
- Silvia Pinal as Rosa María ("Rosita")
- Carlos Martínez Baena as Don Sebastián
- Óscar Pulido as Elpidio
- Josefina del Mar as La vecina bailarina
- Fernando Casanova as Raúl
- José Baviera as Dr. Perfecto Lozano
- Conchita Gentil Arcos as Doña Cuca, vecina
- Pepe Martínez as Profesor examinador
- Pitouto as Don Fortino
- Ricardo Adalid as Amigo de Raúl en fiesta (uncredited)
- Luis Badillo as El turco (uncredited)
- Stephen Berne as Masajista (uncredited)
- Victorio Blanco as Hombre en velorio (uncredited)
- Carmen Cabrera as Miembra del patronato (uncredited)
- Jaime Calpe as Estudiante inteligente (uncredited)
- Rodolfo Calvo as Hombre en velorio (uncredited)
- Flora Alicia Campos as Clienta sirvienta del portero (uncredited)
- Lupe Carriles as Vecina chismosa (uncredited)
- Enrique Carrillo as El tarzán, vecino pachuco (uncredited)
- Mario Castillo as Felipe León Bravo, el diputado (uncredited)
- Jorge Chesterking as John, amigo de Perfecto (uncredited)
- Felipe de Flores as Amigo de Raúl en fiesta (uncredited)
- Lupe del Castillo as Vecina (uncredited)
- Edmundo Espino as Esposo de Guadalupe (uncredited)
- María Gentil Arcos as Vecina chismosa (uncredited)
- Elodia Hernández as Doña Guadalupe (uncredited)
- Regino Herrera as Vecino (uncredited)
- Rafael Icardo as Secretario (uncredited)
- Jaime Jiménez Pons as Estudiante (uncredited)
- Paco Martínez as Miembro del patronato (uncredited)
- José Luis Moreno as Estudiante (uncredited)
- José Pardavé as Lechero (uncredited)
- Ismael Pérez as Estudiante (uncredited)
- Jorge Pérez as Estudiante (uncredited)
- Salvador Quiroz as Empleado de carrera de caballos (uncredited)
- Humberto Rodríguez as Empleado de secretaría (uncredited)
- Félix Samper as Miembro del patronato barbudo (uncredited)
- María Valdealde as Miembra del patronato (uncredited)

== Themes and analysis ==
John Mraz noted that the film was one of two in which Cantinflas made "disparaging, if humorous remarks" about the pachuco style popularized by fellow comedian Germán Valdés ("Tin-Tan"), the other being If I Were a Congressman. Neufeld, Matthews and Beezley cite the film as an example of comedians imitating and making fun of the same themes, such as macho characters drowning their sorrows in ranchera films.

== Bibliography ==
- García Berumen, Frank Javier (2016). Latino Image Makers in Hollywood: Performers, Filmmakers and Films Since the 1960s. McFarland. ISBN 978-1-4766-1411-3.
- Mraz, John (2009). Looking for Mexico: Modern Visual Culture and National Identity. Duke University Press. ISBN 978-0-8223-9220-0.
- Neufeld, Stephen; Matthews, Michael; Beezley, William H. (2015). Mexico in Verse: A History of Music, Rhyme, and Power. University of Arizona Press. ISBN 978-0-8165-3132-5.
- Pilcher, Jeffrey M. (2001). Cantinflas and the Chaos of Mexican Modernity. Rowman & Littlefield. ISBN 978-0-8420-2771-7.
