= Mercy (1953 film) =

1953 film by Zacarías Gómez Urquiza

- Directed by: Zacarías Gómez Urquiza
- Written by: Zacarías Gómez Urquiza; Benito Pérez Galdós (novel)
- Produced by: Manuel Altolaguirre
- Starring: Sara García; Carmen Montejo; Anita Blanch
- Cinematography: Manuel Gómez Urquiza
- Edited by: Carlos Savage
- Production company: Producciones Isla
- Release date: 13 March 1953
- Running time: 85 minutes
- Country: Mexico
- Language: Spanish

Mercy (Spanish: Misericordia) is a 1953 Mexican drama film directed by Zacarías Gómez Urquiza and starring Sara García, Carmen Montejo and Anita Blanch.

== Cast ==
- Sara García as Benigna
- Carmen Montejo as Juliana
- Anita Blanch as Doña Francisca Zapata y Pruneda
- Ángel Garasa as Don Carchito
- Manuel Dondé as Yuco
- José Baviera as Don Romualdo, sacerdote
- Alberto Mariscal as Antonio
- Francisco Reiguera as Don Carlos Moreno Trujillo
- Beatriz Saavedra as Obdulia
- Ana Bertha Lepe as Celedonia
- Lupe Carriles as Limosnera chismosa
- Manuel Casanueva as Notario
- Enedina Díaz de León as Doña Florita, limosnera
- Pedro Elviro as Limosnero
- Gilberto González as Limosnero
- Jesús Gómez as Policía
- Leonor Gómez as Limosnera
- Isabel Herrera as Mujer sale iglesia
- Ramón Sánchez as Herrero
- Paz Villegas as Doña Bernarda

== Bibliography ==
- María Luisa Amador. Cartelera cinematográfica, 1950-1959. UNAM, 1985.
