= Corona de lágrimas =

Corona de lágrimas (English: Crown of tears) may refer to:

- Corona de lágrimas (film), a 1968 Mexican film starring Marga López and Enrique Lizalde
- Corona de lágrimas (1965 TV series)
- Corona de lágrimas (2012 TV series)
