= It Happened in Acapulco =

1953 film by Alejandro Galindo

- Directed by: Alejandro Galindo
- Written by: Daura Caramelia; Ramón Pérez Peláez
- Produced by: Jesús Galindo; Eduardo Galindo
- Starring: Martha Roth; Raúl Martínez; Domingo Soler
- Cinematography: Rosalío Solano
- Edited by: Jorge Busto
- Music by: Gonzalo Curiel
- Production company: Producciones Galindo Hermanos
- Release date: 21 October 1953
- Running time: 80 minutes
- Country: Mexico
- Language: Spanish

It Happened in Acapulco (Spanish: Sucedió en Acapulco) is a 1953 Mexican comedy drama film directed by Alejandro Galindo and starring Martha Roth, Raúl Martínez and Domingo Soler. It was shot at the Churubusco Studios in Mexico City. The film's sets were designed by the art director Ramón Rodríguez Granada.

== Cast ==
- Martha Roth as Licha
- Raúl Martínez as Raúl Montalvo
- Domingo Soler as Don Sostenes
- Angélica María as Maruca
- Esther Luquín as Lolita
- Alfredo Varela as Alberto
- Maruja Grifell as Tía Sonia
- José Jasso as Leyva, chantajista
- Beatriz Saavedra as Alicia, nana
- Salvador Quiroz as Señor juez
- José Muñoz as Tío Laureano
- Josefina Leiner as Sirvienta
- Joaquín Roche as Conductor de tren
- José Chávez as Manos brujas
- Felipe de Flores as Anunciador radio
- Bruno Márquez as Marido de Lolita
- Ramón Bugarini as Mesero
- Luz María Aguilar as Fan de Raúl
- Ana Bertha Lepe as Fan de Raúl

== Bibliography ==
- Mora, Carl J. Mexican Cinema: Reflections of a Society, 1896-2004. McFarland & Co, 2005.
