= Beauty Salon (film) =

1951 film

- Directed by: José Díaz Morales
- Written by: José G. Cruz; José Díaz Morales; Fernando A. Rivero; Carlos Sampelayo
- Produced by: Emilio Tuero
- Starring: Emilio Tuero; Rita Macedo; Andrea Palma
- Cinematography: Ezequiel Carrasco
- Edited by: Fernando Martínez
- Music by: Gonzalo Curiel
- Production company: Argel Films
- Distributed by: Cinematografistas Unidos
- Release date: 16 November 1951
- Running time: 98 minutes
- Country: Mexico
- Language: Spanish

Beauty Salon (Spanish: Salón de belleza) is a 1951 Mexican drama film directed by José Díaz Morales and starring Emilio Tuero, Rita Macedo and Andrea Palma. It was shot at the Clasa Studios in Mexico City. The film's sets were designed by the art director Ramón Rodríguez Granada.

== Cast ==
- Emilio Tuero as Román Alcocer
- Rita Macedo as Katy
- Andrea Palma as Doña Marta
- Elda Peralta as Socorro
- Liliana Durán as Elisa Manci
- María Douglas as Sandra
- Gloria Mange as Rosa Luz
- José Baviera as Arnoldo
- Emma Roldán as Tía de Socorro
- José Pidal as Don Samuel
- Fanny Schiller as Doña Susana
- Rosario Gálvez as Almira
- Kika Meyer as Lilia
- Roberto Spriu as Marido de Lilia
- Juan Orraca as Armando
- José Pulido as Carlos Sandoval
- Carlota Solares as Alegre divorciada
- Magda Donato as Doña Delia de Montealto
- Lidia Franco as Clienta chismosa
- Teresa Carvajal as Manicurista
- Francisco Pando as Mayordomo de Elisa
- Armida Bracho as Empleada salón
- Francisco Reiguera as Esposo de Delia
- Lupe Carriles as Clienta salón
- José Luis Rojas as Amante de Lilia
- Mariano Requena as Doctor
- Pedro Elviro as Novio alegre divorciada

== Bibliography ==
- Amador, María Luisa. Cartelera cinematográfica, 1950-1959. UNAM, 1985.
- Ibarra, Jesús. Los Bracho: tres generaciones de cine mexicano. UNAM, 2006.
