= The Criminal Life of Archibaldo de la Cruz =

Ensayo de un Crimen The Criminal Life of Archibaldo de la Cruz
- Poster
- Spanish: Ensayo de un crimen
- Directed by: Luis Buñuel
- Screenplay by: Luis Buñuel; Eduardo Ugarte
- Based on: Ensayo de un crimen (1944 novel) by Rodolfo Usigli
- Produced by: Alfonso Patiño Gómez
- Starring: Miroslava; Ernesto Alonso; Rita Macedo; Ariadna Welter; Andrea Palma; Leonor Llausás
- Cinematography: Agustín Jiménez
- Edited by: Jorge Bustos
- Music by: Jorge Pérez
- Production company: Alianza Cinematográfica
- Distributed by: Películas Nacionales
- Release date: 19 May 1955 (Mexico)
- Running time: 89 minutes
- Country: Mexico
- Language: Spanish

The Criminal Life of Archibaldo de la Cruz (Spanish: Ensayo de un crimen, lit. 'Rehearsal for a Crime') is a 1955 Mexican crime comedy film directed and co-written by Luis Buñuel and starring Miroslava, Ernesto Alonso, Rita Macedo, Ariadna Welter, Andrea Palma and Leonor Llausás. This film features the film debut of the actress Ariadna Welter and also the last appearance of Miroslava, in her film role, two months after her death in the same year. It is based on a 1944 novel by Rodolfo Usigli.

It tells the story of a would-be serial killer whose female victims keep dying before he has the chance to murder them.

== Plot ==
Wealthy man Archibaldo de la Cruz tells a story about his childhood to a nun. During the Mexican Revolution, Archibaldo's indulgent mother gave him her special music box, which his stern governess said had the power to cause the death of one's enemies. To test the magic, Archibaldo wound up the box, and his governess was almost immediately struck by a stray bullet, leaving Archibaldo convinced that he killed her. Admitting he liked how powerful this made him feel, Archibaldo threatens the nun with a straight razor, but she runs away, only to fall down an open elevator shaft. When Archibaldo is called in by a judge investigating the incident, he confesses that he killed the nun, and she is not his first victim. Archibaldo then tells the judge a story:

A few weeks earlier, Archibaldo hears his music box playing in an antique shop. An attractive woman named Lavinia and her elderly fiancé are looking at it, but Archibaldo convinces the salesman to sell it to him instead by saying it belonged to his mother and was stolen during the Revolution. Back at home, Archibaldo plays the box and cuts himself shaving, the blood bringing back images of his governess' dead body.

Outside the home of Carlota Cervantes, a young woman he is courting, Archibaldo runs into Patricia Terrazas, who recognizes him from a gambling parlor they both used to frequent. Carlota's mother sees Archibaldo and warns Carlotta, who is with her married lover, the architect Alejandro Rivas. Archibaldo gives Carlota a vase he made and says he has feelings that scare him, but believes he can be saved by her purity. A jealous Alejandro wants to interrupt, so, to avoid a scene, Carlota's mother says Carlota has to leave.

At the gambling parlor, Archibaldo sees Patricia. He hears her argue with her lover, Willy Corduran, and follows when she storms off. She crashes Willy's car, and Archibaldo offers to drive her home, stopping at his house to get his razor. While Patricia pours them drinks, Archibaldo imagines killing her and prepares to do it for real, but Willy enters, interrupting his plan. Patricia admits she was just trying to make Willy jealous, and Archibaldo leaves when the couple begin to kiss, though they are already arguing by the time he walks out the door. In the morning, a police detective tells Archibaldo that Patricia has committed suicide.

Carlota avoids a phone call from Archibaldo, so he goes to a bar alone. He sees Lavinia and is transfixed, as she appears to be surrounded by the flames from her drink. Lavinia comes over, mostly to get a break from the American tourists she is showing around. Her fiancé arrives, and she gives Archibaldo an address where she can be contacted, before excusing herself.

Archibaldo visits Carlota and proposes, but she says she needs a month or two to decide. He goes to the address Lavinia gave him and discovers it is a dress shop. No one has heard of Lavinia, but there is a mannequin that looks just like her. Remembering that, as well as a tour guide, she mentioned working as a model for artists, he asks who made the mannequin and visits the artist's studio. Lavinia is there and is impressed he found her. After being reassured he does not live alone, she agrees to come to his home, supposedly to model.

Carlota visits Alejandro at work to tell him they have to break up, even though she still loves him, since his wife refuses to grant a divorce. He guesses that Archibaldo proposed and says he will not let Carlota go so easily.

The day Lavinia is to visit, Archibaldo sends his servants away. He introduces her to the cousin he said lives with him, and she is amused to discover the "cousin" is really the mannequin, which he purchased. While he is out of the room firing up his kiln and getting drinks, Lavinia swaps clothes with the mannequin to play a trick on Archibaldo. He tries to kiss her, but she resists, so he kisses the mannequin, and then Lavinia kisses him. She begins to remove her clothes from the mannequin, but Archibaldo asks her to leave them and keep the mannequin's more-expensive clothes.

Archibaldo has Lavinia look at a childhood photo album and is sneaking up behind her when the doorbell rings. He answers it, and a group of tourists burst in. Lavinia innocently claims she invited them to tour his pottery studio, but he is angered by her trick. She says she is getting married, so she is quitting her job and will not see him again.

After Lavinia leaves with the tourists, Archibaldo takes the mannequin and puts it in his kiln, watching with a perverse glee as it melts. Carlota and her mother arrive to say Carlota has accepted the proposal, which overjoys Archibaldo, though Carlota seems ambivalent, and her mother bursts into tears.

Shortly before the wedding, Archibaldo gets a letter telling him to go to Alejandro's apartment. He watches from outside as Carlota enters and Alejandro closes the blinds. She asks Alejandro not to interfere in her wedding, to which he agrees, but he also says he feels something will keep them from being parted. Disappointed that Carlota does not seem to be as pure as he thought, Archibaldo fantasizes about shooting her on their wedding night in her wedding gown after making her pray, but this plan is foiled when, just after the ceremony, Alejandro shoots her instead.

Having heard Archibaldo's confession, the judge says that, while Archibaldo has the potential to be a criminal, he has committed no crimes. Still feeling responsible for the women's deaths, Archibaldo returns home and listens to the music box. Suddenly, he stops it, goes to a park, and throws it in a lake. Immediately, he feels better. He runs into Lavinia, and learns she did not get married after all. They link arms and walk away together.

== Cast ==
- Ernesto Alonso as Archibaldo de la Cruz
  - Rafael Banquells Jr. as Archibaldo as a boy (uncredited)
- Miroslava as Lavinia, a tour guide and artists' model
- Rita Macedo as Patricia Terrazas, an emotionally volatile associate of Carlota
- Ariadna Welter as Carlota Cervantes, Archibaldo's fiancée
- Andrea Palma as Mrs. Cervantes, Carlota 's mother
- Rodolfo Landa as Alejandro Rivas, Carlota's married lover
- José María Linares-Rivas as Willy Corduran, Patricia's boyfriend
- Leonor Llausás as Archibaldo's childhood governess
- Eva Calvo as Señora de la Cruz, Archibaldo's mother
- Enrique Díaz 'Indiano' as Señor de la Cruz, Archibaldo's father
- Carlos Riquelme as the police inspector who investigates Patricia's death and is a guest at the wedding
- Chabela Durán as Sister Trinidad, Archibaldo's nurse
- Carlos Martínez Baena as the priest at the wedding
- Manuel Dondé as the colonel at the wedding
- Armando Velasco as the judge to whom Archibaldo confesses

Uncredited

- Roberto Meyer as the doctor who gives the judge a statement
- Francisco Ledesma as an employee at the antique shop
- Antonio Bravo as the antiques dealer
- Enrique García Álvarez as Chucho, Lavinia's elderly fiancé
- José Peña as Esteban, the older of Archibaldo's servants
- Lupe Carriles as the Cervantes' maid
- Eduardo Alcaraz as "Gordo" Azuara, who runs a gambling parlor
- Ángel Di Stefani as the police detective who questions Archibaldo in his workshop
- Ángel Merino as the police handwriting expert
- Leonor Gómez as the waitress who gets Archibaldo to sign a book
- Janet Alcoriza as a tourist from Oklahoma
- Jorge Chesterking as a tourist from Oklahoma
- Elodia Hernández as the owner of the dress shop

== Academic criticism ==
Ensayo de un crimen has been analyzed and studied by academics and critics such as Victor Fuentes, Gerardo T. Cummings, Marsha Kinder, and Ilan Stavans. Fuentes, a retired professor from the University of California, Santa Barbara, included chapters dedicated to the detailed analytical study of the film in his book, La mirada de Buñuel (Spain: Tabla Rasa Libros y Ediciones, 2006), finding correlations between Ensayo de un crimen and Él. In 2004, Cummings published an article in the Puerto Rican journal Revista Horizontes, in which he analyzed the intertextual connections between the film and its literary source, the novel of the same name by Rodolfo Usigli (this article was part of a larger dissertation chapter on the echoes of the novel in the film).

The film's exploration of obsessive desire has been compared to Alfred Hitchcock's Vertigo (1958).

In 2002, Slant Magazine called the film "a twisted tragicomedy on male obsession [...] the closest Spanish auteur Luis Buñuel ever came to directing a bona fide suspense thriller."

Buñuel briefly references the production of Ensayo de un crimen in his 1983 autobiography Mon dernier soupir (My Last Breath). In it, he recounts how he was syndicated into orchestrating an original composition for the movie, and that, when the members of the orchestra disrobed due to heat, he saw that "at least 3/4ths of them carried holstered guns". Later in the book, Buñuel sadly recalls the ironic parallel between a scene where the protagonist cremates a wax mannequin based on Miroslava, and Miroslava's actual cremation following her suicide shortly after production wrapped.
