= Rita Macedo =

Mexican actress (1925–1993)

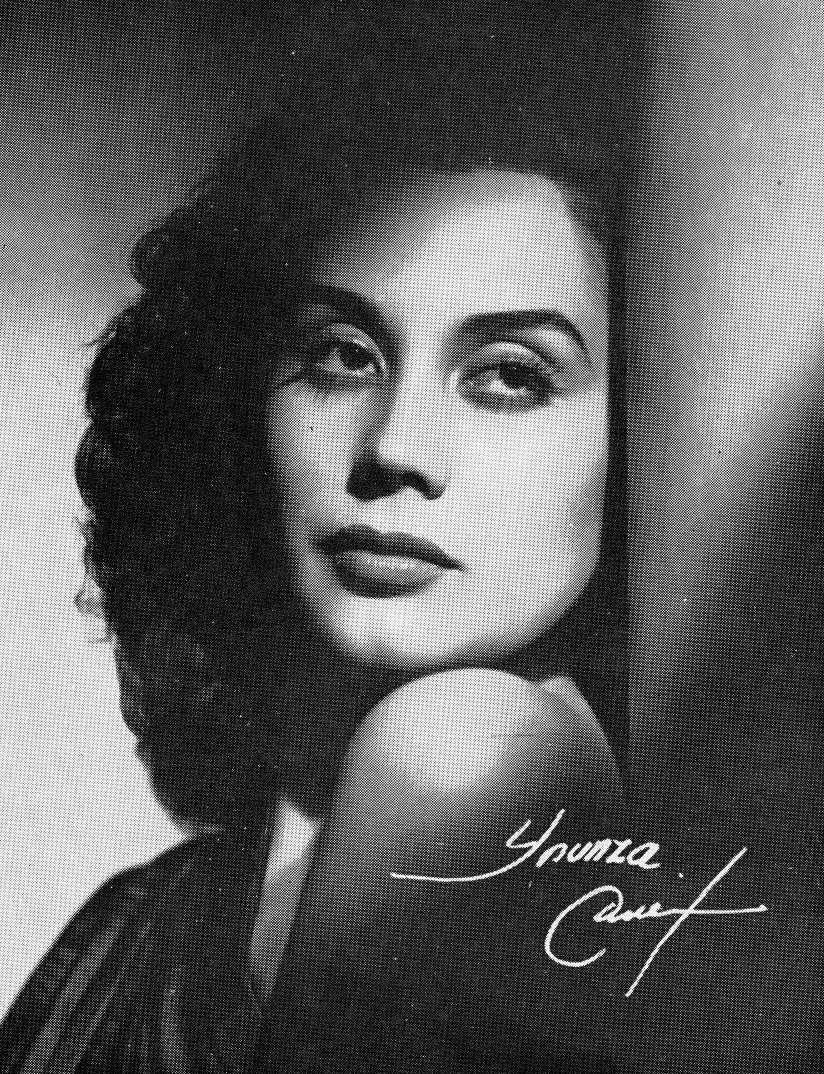
- Macedo in 1954
- Born: María de la Concepción Macedo Guzmán; April 21, 1925; Mexico City, Mexico
- Died: December 5, 1993 (aged 68); Mexico City, Mexico
- Occupations: Actress dressmaker
- Years active: 1942–1993
- Children: 3, including Julissa and Luis de Llano Macedo

Rita Macedo (April 21, 1925 – December 5, 1993) was a Mexican actress and dressmaker. She was nominated for an Ariel Award for her 1956 performance in "Ensayo de un crimen" and in 1991 for a TVyNovelas Prize for "Alcanzar una estrella". She won the Best Actress Ariel Award in 1972 for "Tú, yo, y nosotros". She was married to a pioneer of Mexican radio, television and film, Luis de Llano Palmer, by whom she had two children, Julissa, an actress and musician, and Luis de Llano Macedo, renowned telenovela producer. She also was instrumental in bringing many works of international writers to the Mexican stage.

== Biography ==
María de la Concepción Macedo Guzmán was born in Mexico City, Mexico on April 21, 1925 to Miguel Macedo and Julia Guzmán, a celebrated writer. Her childhood was difficult, having grown up away from her parents attending boarding schools. When they divorced, she became estranged from her father.

She initially used the stage name Conchita, but later changed it to Rita. Macedo began her career at age 15 under film director Mauricio de la Serna, in a film starring Mapy Cortés and Domingo Soler, which was entitled "Las Cinco Noches de Adan" ("The Five Nights of Adam"). The film was very popular and eventually led to appearances in more than 60 movies. Though, Macedo acknowledged that poor reviews on other early films forced her to work hard at her craft and do live theater. She traveled to New York City and Paris and bought scripts like "Réquiem para una monja" (Requiem for a Nun) and "Santuario" (Sanctuary) by Faulkner and brought them to Mexico with successful performances.

Macedo's films included "Rosenda" (1948), "Felipe de Jesús" (1949), "El rencor de la Tierra" (1949), "Joya perdida", "Manos de seda" (1951), "Las infieles" (1953), "El enmascarado de plata" (1954), "Los bandidos de Río Frío" (1956), "Pies de gato" (1957), "El hombre de papel" (1963) and "La maldición de la llorona" (1963). She was nominated for an Ariel Award as Best Co-Starring Actress for "Ensayo de un crimen" in 1956. and "Nazarin," which was directed by the Spanish director Luis Buñuel in 1958 was well received. In 1972, she won the Best Actress Ariel Award for "Tu, Yo y Nosotros" and completed the film "El castillo de la pureza".

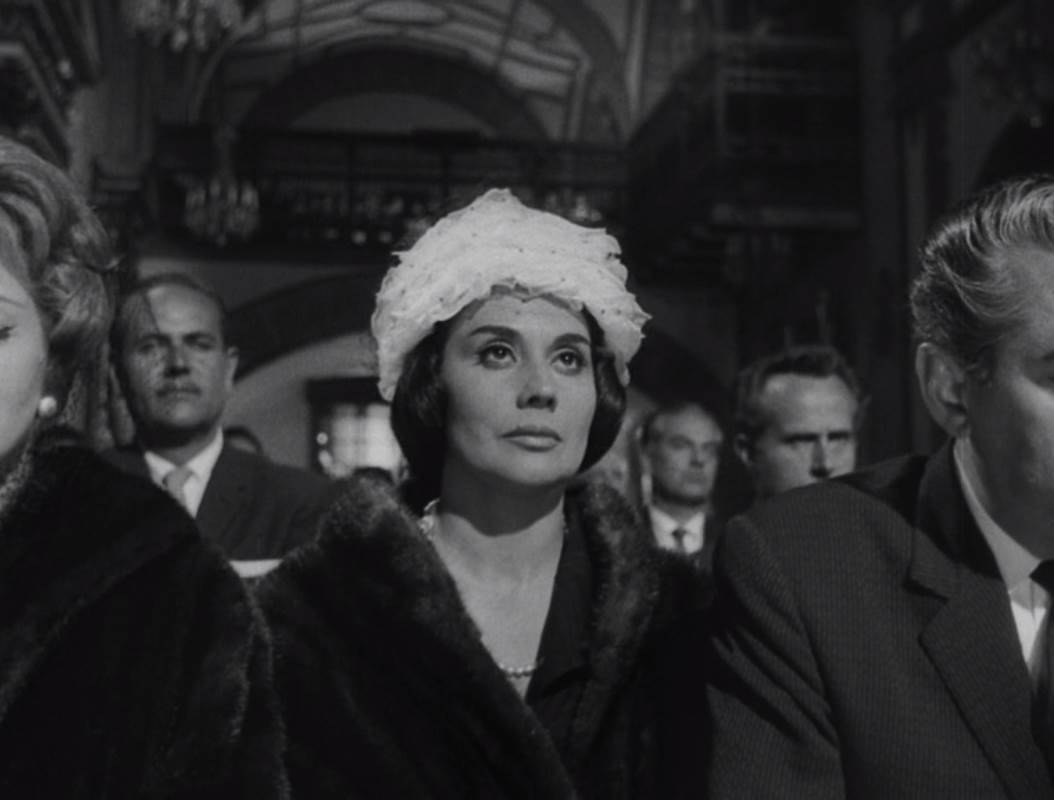
Macedo in El ángel exterminador (1962)

Increasingly she performed more on stage and in television. She brought "Las Criadas" a play by Jean Genet to Mexican audiences, as well as "La mala semilla" (The Bad Seed), which was later successfully acted in by Angélica María and María Rojo. She also premiered in the play "El tuerto es rey" by her husband, Carlos Fuentes, in Barcelona, under the direction of Ricard Salvat. Her performance in Terence Rattigan's "Mesas separadas" (Separate Tables) with Salvador Novo was noted.

Macedo and her son Luis de Llano Macedo were both nominated in 1991 for a TVyNovelas Prize for "Alcanzar una estrella". He won his nomination, she did not.

Her first husband was radio, television and theater producer Luis de Llano Palmer with whom she had two children: actress Julissa, one of Mexico's first rock stars. and the producer Luis de Llano Macedo. She was then briefly married to Pablo Palomino, and after their divorce married the writer Carlos Fuentes, with whom she had a daughter Cecilia Fuentes Macedo.

== Personal life and death ==
Macedo was diagnosed with cancer. She killed herself on December 5, 1993.

== Awards ==
- "Ensayo de un crimen" (1956), nominated for Best Supporting Actress, Ariel Awards
- "Tú, yo, y nosotros" (1972), WON Best Actress, Ariel Awards
- "Alcanzar una estrella" (1991), nominated for Best Actress, TVyNovelas Prize

== Filmography ==
=== Films ===
- Las cinco noches de Adán (1942)
- El ángel negro (1942)
- Cambiando el destino (1942)
- Internado para señoritas (1943) (released as Girls Boarding School in the US in 1944)
- El ropavejero (1947)
- Five Faces of Woman (1947)
- Felipe Was Unfortunate (1947)
- La casa colorada (1947)
- Rosenda (1948)
- Adventures of Casanova (1948)
- El gallero (1948)
- Autumn and Spring (1949)
- Philip of Jesus (1949)
- El rencor de la tierra (1949)
- Duel in the Mountains (1950)
- Las joyas del pecado (1950)
- Por la puerta falsa (1950)
- My Husband (1951)
- Corazón de fiera (1951)
- El señor gobernador (1951)
- Manos de seda (1951)
- Por querer a una mujer (1951)
- Stronghold (1951)
- Beauty Salon (1951)
- My Adorable Savage (1952)
- Las infieles (1953)
- Ensayo de un crimen (1955)
- La mujer ajena (1955)
- The Medallion Crime (1956)
- The Bandits of Cold River (1956)
- Pueblo, canto y esperanza (1956)
- Pies de Gato (1957)
- Las últimas banderas (1957)
- Nazarín (1958)
- La estrella vacía (1958)
- Quinceañera (1958)
- La reina del cielo (1959)
- Una Bala es mi testigo (1960)
- La Rosa Blanca (1961)
- El globero (1961)
- The Guns of Juana Gallo (1962)
- Cielo rojo (1962)
- El ángel exterminador (1962)
- A Bullet for Billy the Kid (1963)
- El hombre de papel (1963)
- La maldición de la llorona (1963)
- En la mitad del mundo (1964)
- Neutron vs. the Maniac (1964)
- El fugitivo (1966)
- Nosotros los jóvenes (1966)
- Hombres de roca (1966)
- Paula (1969)
- Los corrompidos (1971)
- El juicio de los hijos (1971)
- Jesús, nuestro Señor (1971)
- Una mujer honesta (1972)
- Victoria (1972)
- Tú, yo, nosotros (1972)
- El castillo de la pureza (1972)
- Los ángeles de la tarde (1972)
- Había una vez un pillo (1974)
- La otra virginidad (1975)
- Espejismo de la ciudad (1976)
- Divinas palabras (1977)
- Los indolentes (1979)
- Ángel del barrio (1981)
- Veneno para las hadas (1984)
- Cambiando el destino (1992)

=== Television ===
- La mujer dorada (1960)
- Donde comienza la tristeza (1960)
- Las modelos (1963)
- Traicionera (1963)
- La impostora (1965)
- La casa de las fieras (1967)
- Secreto para tres (1969)
- Las máscaras (1971)
- Hermanos Coraje (1972-1974)
- Entre brumas (1973)
- Los lunes... Teatro (1974)
- El manantial del milagro (1974)
- La tierra (1974)
- El milagro de vivir(1975)
- Paloma (1975)
- Mundos opuestos (1976)
- Pasiones encendidas (1978)
- Mi amor frente al pasado (1979)
- Otra vuelta de tuerca (1981) Mini-Series
- Una limosna de amor (1981)
- Soledad (1980)
- Videocosmos (1983)
- Herencia maldita (1986)
- Nuevo amanecer (1988)
- Alcanzar una estrella (1991)
- Baila conmigo (1992)
