= Mi amor frente al pasado =

Mi amor frente al pasado may refer to:

- Mi amor frente al pasado (1960 TV series), a Mexican telenovela
- Mi amor frente al pasado (1979 TV series), a Mexican telenovela
