= The Photographer (1953 film) =

- Directed by: Miguel M. Delgado
- Written by: Jaime Salvador (adaptation and dialogue); Miguel M. Delgado (technical screenplay)
- Story by: Gustavo Pacheco M.
- Starring: Mario Moreno «Cantinflas»; Rosita Arenas; Rebeca Iturbide
- Cinematography: Gabriel Figueroa
- Edited by: Jorge Busto
- Music by: Raúl Lavista
- Production company: Posa Films
- Distributed by: Columbia Pictures
- Release date: 2 September 1953 (Mexico)
- Running time: 100 minutes
- Country: Mexico
- Language: Spanish

The Photographer or Mr. Photographer (Spanish: El señor fotógrafo) is a 1953 Mexican comedy thriller film directed by Miguel M. Delgado and starring Mario Moreno «Cantinflas», Rosita Arenas, Rebeca Iturbide and Ángel Garasa.The film's art direction was by Gunther Gerszo.

== Plot ==
An apprentice of photography (Cantinflas) is accidentally involved in an international complot when he ends up being left in charge of a chemical engineer (Ángel Garasa) who went insane after he invents a bomb and an attempt is made against his life.

== Cast ==
- Mario Moreno as Cantinflas
- Rosita Arenas as Chelito
- Ángel Garasa as Raúl Penagos
- Rebeca Iturbide as Diana Alvírez
- Fernando Wagner as Jefe de villanos
- Julio Villarreal as Roberto Alvírez
- Wolf Ruvinskis as Lepka
- José Pidal as Doctor Saldívar
- Beatriz Ramos as Enfermera de Dr. Saldívar
- Eduardo Alcaraz as Coronel
- Conchita Gentil Arcos as Mamá de Chelito
- Salvador Quiroz as Don Ole
- María Herrero as Ana María Méndez
- Héctor Mateos as Pablo, mayordomo
- Pitouto as Novio fotografiado
- Víctor Alcocer as Hombre gordo fotografiado (uncredited)
- Armando Arriola as Policía (uncredited)
- León Barroso as Señor Mendieta, paciente del manicomio (uncredited)
- Ada Carrasco as Enfermera (uncredited)
- Lupe Carriles as Cliente fea (uncredited)
- Antonio Raxel as Felón (uncredited)
- Hernán Vera as Don Florentino, cantinero (uncredited)

== Reception ==
The film set an opening day record in Mexico grossing $5,810 at the Cine Roble.

== Bibliography ==
- Shaw, Lisa & Dennison, Stephanie. Popular Cinema in Brazil. Manchester University Press, 2004.
