= Eduardo Alcaraz =

Chilean-Mexican actor (1915–1987)

- Born: Alfredo Vergara Morales; 13 April 1915; Santiago, Chile
- Died: 18 April 1987 (aged 72); Mexico City, Mexico
- Occupation: Actor

Alfredo Vergara Morales (13 April 1915 – 18 April 1987), best known by the stage name Eduardo Alcaraz, was a Chilean-Mexican actor. Born in Santiago, he was based in Mexico since 1951. He appeared in films such as Escuela de rateros (1958) alongside Pedro Infante. He also worked as voice actor in many movies and cartoons.

In 1949, while working at Radio Quito in Ecuador, he participated in an adaptation of The War of the Worlds, similar to how Orson Welles had done a decade earlier in the United States. Alcaraz was in charge of the script of this new version, which like Welles's version represented the events narrated as if it were a true transmission. When it was revealed that it was a fictional story, a crowd made their way to the El Comercio newspaper building, where the radio worked, and set it on fire. Six people died.

== Selected filmography ==
=== Film ===
- Hollywood es así (1944)
- Lost Love (1951)) - Don Paco
- Woman Without Tears (1951) - Señor cura
- Women's Prison (1951) - Teniente
- She and I (1951) - Agente viajero
- Los enredos de una gallega (1951) - Don León
- Las locuras de Tin-Tan (1952) - Señor Landa (uncredited)
- If I Were a Congressman (1952) - Doctor
- Dos caras tiene el destino (1952) - Agente de policía (uncredited)
- Chucho the Mended (1952) - Amante de Margot
- Te sigo esperando (1952) - (uncredited)
- es:Mi campeón (1952) - Señor Maccini (uncredited)
- Carne de presidio (1952) - Señor director carcel
- Now I Am Rich (1952) - Dr. Velasco
- The Atomic Fireman (1952) - Sargento Policía
- Sister Alegría (1952) - Apostador hipódromo
- Tío de mi vida (1952) - Don Roque
- Pompey the Conqueror (1953) - Señor Berremundo, gerente hotel (uncredited)
- Forbidden Fruit (1953) - Felipe, mayordomo
- The Bachelors (1953) - Gerente hotel
- The Unfaithful (1953) - Aurelio (uncredited)
- Quiéreme porque me muero (1953) - Doctor (uncredited)
- Nunca es tarde para amar (1953) - Empresario brasileño (uncredited)
- The Photographer (1953) - Coronel
- Orquídeas para mi esposa (1954) - L.G. Castro (uncredited)
- Camelia (1954) - (uncredited)
- Casa de muñecas (1954) - Joyero (uncredited)
- La ladrona (1954) - Luigi
- Hijas casaderas (1954)
- El gran autor (1954) - Amigo de Sergio (uncredited)
- When I Leave (1954) - Sr. Dobie (uncredited)
- Se solicitan modelos (1954) - Señor Silvanito
- La visita que no tocó el timbre (1965) - Don Francisco Delgado
- Maldita ciudad (1954) - Director cinematográfico
- Un minuto de bondad (1954) - Gaspar, mayordomo
- La desconocida (1954)
- La rebelión de los colgados (1954) - Doctor
- The Seven Girls (1955) - Empresario
- Tu vida entre mis manos (1955) - Nicolas, cantinero
- School for Tramps (1955) - Audifas
- El vendedor de muñecas (1955)
- To the Four Winds (1955) - Modisto
- Historia de un abrigo de mink (1955) - Sr. Rosenblum
- Amor de lejos (1955) - Señor juez
- The Criminal Life of Archibaldo de la Cruz (1955) - Gordo Azuara (uncredited)
- Drop the Curtain (1955) - Artista en teatro (uncredited)
- La barranca de la muerte (1955) - (uncredited)
- Las viudas del cha-cha-cha (1955)
- Look What Happened to Samson (1955) - Padre de Dalila
- Tres melodías de amor (1955)
- Silent Fear (1956) - Dr. Rivas
- Pura Vida (1956) - Febronio
- La pequeña enemiga (1956) - Doctor Olivo
- The Medallion Crime (1956) - Ramiro
- Viva la juventud! (1956) - Don Rodrigo
- La sierra del terror (1956)
- The Third Word (1956) - Administrador Roldán
- The Hidden One (1956) - Señor Ariza
- Bataclam Mexicano (1956) - (uncredited)
- Spring in the Heart (1956) - Arturo Dávila
- ¡Que seas feliz! (1956) - Maestro
- Una lección de amor (1956)
- The Brave One (1956) - Ticket seller (uncredited)
- Esposas infieles (1956)
- La adúltera (1956) - Amigo de Raúl (uncredited)
- Dos diablitos en apuros (1957) - Conductor tren
- Las aventuras de Pito Pérez (1957) - Padre Pureco
- El campeón ciclista (1957) - Don Cosme Morales
- Pablo and Carolina (1957) - Guillermo, mayordomo
- Cómicos de la Legua (1957) - El abandonado
- Ladrón de cadáveres (1957) - Jefe policía
- Vainilla, bronce y morir (Una mujer más) (1957) - Papá de Enrique
- Mi desconocida esposa (1958) - Gregorio Salas
- Escuela para suegras (1958) - Segismundo
- Refifí entre las mujeres (1958) - Don Julián
- Trip to the Moon (1958) - Presidente
- Escuela de rateros (1958) - Toño
- Tú y la mentira (1958)
- Música en la noche (1958)
- La mafia del crimen (1958)
- Aladino y la lámpara maravillosa (1958) - Genio de la lámpara
- Siete pecados (1959) - Armando
- Los hijos ajenos (1959) - Miguel
- Mis secretarias privadas (1959) - Don Luis
- Yo pecador (1959) - Señor Ricaldi
- The White Renegade (1960)
- Chucho el Roto (1960)
- El violetero (1960) - Lic. Vidales
- The Phantom of the Operetta (1960) - Don Quique
- Ojos tapatios (1961) - don Giuseppe
- Caperucita y sus tres amigos (1961)
- Matrimonios juveniles (1961) - Félix, mayordomo
- Aventuras de Chucho el Roto (1961)
- La captura de Chucho el Roto (1961)
- El pecado de una madre (1962) - Fito, empresario
- Nuestros odiosos maridos (1962)
- El cara parchada (1962) - El presidente
- Las recién casadas (1962) - Sr. Campos
- Pilotos de la muerte (1962) - El Barbas
- La entrega de Chucho el Roto (1962)
- Si yo fuera millonario (1962)
- Cri Cri el grillito cantor (1963) - Empresario De Carpa
- Frente al destino (1964)
- Napoleoncito (1964) - Presidente del banco
- Canta mi corazón (1965) - Don Beto
- Sangre en el Bravo (1966) - Krauss
- El pícaro (1967)
- Su Excelencia (1967) - Don Salustio Menchaca, embajador de Los Cocos
- Dos pintores pintorescos (1967) - Profesor italiano
- Por mis pistolas (1968) - Don Chuchito
- Valentín de la Sierra (1968) - (uncredited)
- Un nuevo modo de amar (1968)
- El matrimonio es como el demonio (1969) - Antonio Ancira
- Cuernos debajo de la cama (1969)
- La gran aventura (1969)
- Un Quijote sin mancha (1969) - Licenciado en delegación
- Como perros y gatos (1969) - Don Juan
- El aviso inoportuno (1969) - Doctor
- Las aventuras de Juliancito (1969) - Maestro
- Capulina corazón de leon (1970)
- Fray Don Juan (1970)
- El cuerpazo del delito (1970) - (segment "La insaciable")
- La mujer de oro (1970)
- El tunco Maclovio (1970) - Tadeo Moncada
- Departamento de soltero (1971)
- Una vez, un hombre... (1971)
- En estas camas nadie duerme (1971)
- Mama Dolores (1971) - Víctor
- ¡Cómo hay gente sinvergüenza! (1972) - Don Antonio Meopende
- Los ángeles de la tarde (1972)
- Quién mató al abuelo? (1972)
- La Martina (1972) - Don Fernando
- Peluquero de señoras (1973) - Méndez
- Conserje en condominio (1974) - Lic. Rufino
- La muerte de Pancho Villa (1974)
- El carita (1974)
- Una noche embarazosa (1977) - Sacerdote
- La viuda negra (1977)
- La güera Rodríguez (1978)
- Xoxontla (1978) - Don Jesús Pichardo
- El cuatro dedos (1978)
- The Bees (1978) - Representative at the United Nations - Israel
- El circo de Capulina (1978)
- El año de la peste (1979) - Dr. Luis Mario Zavala
- Vivir para amar (1980)
- Rigo es amor (1980) - El Gallino
- Ay Chihuahua no te rajes! (1980)
- El testamento (1981) - Don Agustín
- Mi nombre es Sergio, soy alcohólico (1981) - Dr. Armando Camarena
- Zorro, The Gay Blade (1981) - Don Jose
- El barrendero (1982) - Don Chafas
- Los cuates de la Rosenda (1982)
- Buenas, y con... movidas (1983)
- El mexicano feo (1984)

=== Television ===
- El otro (1960)
- Marianela (1961)
- Leyendas de México (1968)
- La Gata (1970) - El Francés
- Muchacha italiana viene a casarse (1971) - Vittorio Maglione
- La señora joven (1972) - Federico Ricarte
- Donde termina el camino (1978)

== Bibliography ==
- Monsiváis, Carlos. Pedro Infante. Las leyes del querer. Penguin Random House Grupo Editorial México, 2012.
