= Women's Prison (1951 film) =

1951 film

- Theatrical release poster
- Directed by: Miguel M. Delgado
- Written by: Max Aub; Rogelio Barriga Rivas; Mauricio Magdaleno
- Produced by: José Luis Busto; Tito Junco; Sergio Kogan
- Starring: Miroslava; Sara Montiel; Katy Jurado
- Cinematography: Raúl Martínez Solares
- Edited by: Jorge Bustos
- Music by: Raúl Lavista
- Production company: Internacional Cinematográfica
- Distributed by: Internacional Cinematográfica
- Release date: 28 September 1951
- Running time: 83 minutes
- Country: Mexico
- Language: Spanish

Women's Prison (Spanish: Cárcel de mujeres) is a 1951 Mexican drama film directed by Miguel M. Delgado and starring Miroslava, Sara Montiel and Katy Jurado. The film's sets were designed by the art director Gunther Gerszo.

== Cast ==
- Miroslava as Evangelina
- Sara Montiel as Dora
- Katy Jurado as Lupe
- María Douglas as La Mayora
- Mercedes Soler as Rosa
- Elda Peralta as Prisionera
- Emma Roldán as Petrona
- Eufrosina García as La Chicle
- Pepita Morillo as Prisionera rubia
- Gloria Morel as Gloria, prisionera
- María Gentil Arcos as Guardia
- Luis Beristáin as Júlio
- Eduardo Alcaraz as Teniente
- Miguel Manzano as Doctor
- Tito Junco as Alberto Suárez
- Lupe Carriles as Esther, prisionera
- Lidia Franco as Guardia
- Eva Garza as Cantante
- Leonor Gómez as Prisionera
- Ana María Hernández as Visitadora
- Elodia Hernández as Guardia
- Isabel Herrera as Prisionera
- Ángel Infante as Esposo de Gloria
- Cecilia Leger as Guardia
- Carmen Manzano as Enfermera
- Blanca Marroquín as Prisionera
- Arturo Martín del Campo
- Kika Meyer as Prisionera en biblioteca
- Inés Murillo as Prisionera
- José Pardavé as Taxista
- Salvador Quiroz as Vigilante de Prison
- Isabel Vázquez 'La Chichimeca' as Prisionera

== Bibliography ==
- Mira, Alberto. Historical Dictionary of Spanish Cinema. Scarecrow Press, 2010.
