= Beatriz Saavedra =

Mexican actress

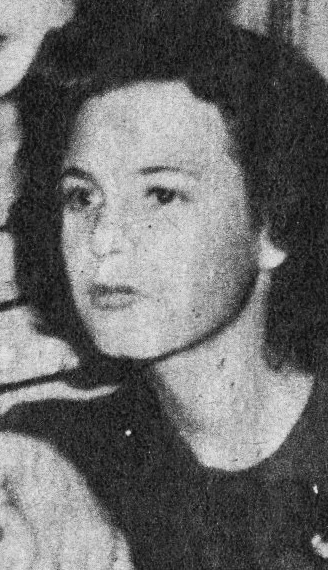
- Beatriz Saavedra in 1951
- Born: Beatriz Saavedra Fuentes; 1933; Mexico City, Mexico
- Died: 20 June 2005 (aged 72); Mexico City, Mexico
- Occupation: Actress
- Years active: 1949–1957

Beatriz Saavedra Fuentes (1933 — 20 June 2005) was a Mexican actress, best known for appearing in films such as Monte de piedad (1951), Tres hombres en mi vida (1952), Tío de mi vida (1952), It Happened in Acapulco (1953), La ladrona (1954), Madame X (1955), Drop the Curtain (1955), La doncella de piedra (1956), and La culta dama (1957).

== Selected filmography ==
- Confessions of a Taxi Driver (1949)
- Witch's Corner (1949)
- A Gringo Girl in Mexico (1951)
- The Cry of the Flesh (1951)
- Full Speed Ahead (1951)
- La miel se fue de la luna (1952)
- When the Fog Lifts (1952)
- The Plebeian (1953)
- Mercy (1953)
- The Magnificent Beast (1953)
- It Happened in Acapulco (1953)
- Dreams of Glory (1953)
- Se solicitan modelos (1954)
- Madame X (1955)
- Drop the Curtain (1955)

== Bibliography ==
- García Riera, Emilio (1969a). Historia documental del cine mexicano: 1949. Ediciones Era.
- de la Vega Alfaro, Eduardo (1998). El cine de Marga López. Universidad de Guadalajara.
- García Riera, Emilio (1997). Historia documental del cine mexicano, Volumen 18. Universidad de Guadalajara.
- Peredo Castro, Francisco (2000). Alejandro Galindo, un alma rebelde en el cine mexicano. Conaculta/Imcine.
- García Riera, Emilio (1969b). Historia documental del cine mexicano: 1952. Ediciones Era.
- García Riera, Emilio (1990). Los hermanos Soler. Universidad de Guadalajara.
- García Riera, Emilio; Macotela, Fernando (1984). La guía del cine mexicano de la pantalla grande a la televisión, 1919–1984. Editorial Patria.
- Amador, María Luisa (1985). Cartelera cinematográfica, 1950–1959. UNAM.
- García Riera, Emilio (1993). Historia documental del cine mexicano: 1955–1956. Universidad de Guadalajara.
