= Corona de lágrimas (1965 TV series) =

Mexican telenovela

- Created by: Manuel Canseco Noriega
- Directed by: Jesús Valero
- Country of origin: Mexico
- Original language: Spanish

Production
- Executive producer: Valentín Pimstein

Original release
- Network: Telesistema Mexicano
- Release: 1965

Corona de lágrimas is a Mexican telenovela, written and produced by Manuel Canseco Noriega and Valentín Pimstein for Telesistema Mexicano in 1965. It stars Prudencia Grifell, Enrique del Castillo and Jorge Lavat.

== Plot ==
It is the story of a mother who suffers from her three children, and one of her sons despises her and does not support the poverty in which his family live.

== Cast ==
- Prudencia Grifell as Refugio Moncada de Chavero "Doña Cuca"
- Enrique del Castillo as Ignacio Chavero Moncada
- Jorge Lavat as Edmundo "Dandy" Chavero Moncada
- Evita Muñoz as Olga Ancira
- Raúl Meraz as Fernando Chavero Moncada
- Pilar Sen as Julieta de Fuentes
- Aurora Alvarado as Lucero Fuentes

== Versions ==
In 1968, a film version with the same name was made, also written by Canseco Noriega and adapted and directed by Alejandro Galindo. In 2012, a free version of the same soap opera adaptation of Jesús Calzada and produced by José Alberto Castro was performed.
