= De turno con la angustia =

- Genre: Telenovela
- Written by: Ignacio Parera
- Directed by: Arturo Salgado
- Starring: Lucy Gallardo; Aarón Hernán; Martha Roth; Gregorio Casal
- Country of origin: Mexico
- Original language: Spanish

Original release
- Network: Televisa

De turno con la angustia, is a 1969 Mexican telenovela produced by Raúl Astor and directed by Arturo Salgado by Televisa. Michoacán Its setting was to Mexico City starting the history of the telenovela February 8, 1957, in Michoacan and then spent 11 years after 1968.

== Cast ==
- Lucy Gallardo as Susana Correa
- Aarón Hernán as Miguel Cossio
- Martha Roth as Elena Barbosa
- Gregorio Casal as Antonio Borghetti
- Marina Baura as María Gabriela de Borghetti
- Carlos Amador as Fernández
- Jorge Lavat as Rosendo Galván
- Rosenda Monteros as Lydia
- Marina Marín as Mayra
- Raúl Boxer as Guardiàn
- Miguel Suárez as Tomás
- Ángela Villanueva as Ivette
