= The Bachelors (1953 film) =

1953 film by Miguel M. Delgado

- Directed by: Miguel M. Delgado
- Written by: Ernesto Cortázar; Miguel M. Delgado; Fernando Galiana
- Produced by: Sergio Kogan
- Starring: Luis Aguilar; Rosita Arenas; Andrés Soler
- Cinematography: Agustín Jiménez
- Edited by: Jorge Busto
- Music by: Rosalío Ramírez; Federico Ruiz
- Production company: Internacional Cinematográfica
- Release date: 30 April 1953
- Running time: 100 minutes
- Country: Mexico
- Language: Spanish

The Bachelors (Spanish: Los solterones) is a 1953 Mexican musical comedy film directed by Miguel M. Delgado and starring Luis Aguilar, Rosita Arenas, and Andrés Soler.

== Partial cast ==
- Luis Aguilar as Gonzalo
- Rosita Arenas as Sebastiana
- Andrés Soler as Don Rafael Gandia
- Carlos Agostí as Carlos
- Carlota Solares as Eva Mariño
- Eduardo Alcaraz as Gerente hotel
- José Muñoz
- José Pardavé
- Enrique Díaz 'Indiano' as Don Procopio
- Elisa Quintanilla
- Pedro Elviro
- Rafael Icardo as Don Lauro
- Álvaro Matute
- Elena Luquín
- Carmen Ignarra as Magda

== Bibliography ==
- María Luisa Amador. Cartelera cinematográfica, 1950-1959. UNAM, 1985.
