= Alberto Mariscal =

American actor

- Born: March 10, 1926; Chicago, Illinois, United States
- Died: April 24, 2010 (aged 84); Los Angeles, California, United States
- Occupations: Actor, director
- Years active: 1946–2000 (film)

Alberto Mariscal (March 10, 1926 – April 24, 2010) was an American-born Mexican actor and film director.

== Partial filmography ==
- Su última aventura (1946) - Reportero (uncredited)
- Barrio de pasiones (1948)
- Corner Stop (1948) - Mecánico (uncredited)
- La Mancornadora (1949)
- Carta Brava (1949) - Policia
- Hay lugar para... dos (1949)
- Confessions of a Taxi Driver (1949) - Constantino Escamilla Cejudo (Tino)
- Ventarrón (1949) - Alfredo
- Amor de la calle (1950) - Memo
- Vagabunda (1950) - Marcial
- El amor no es ciego (1950) - Joe Flores
- El sol sale para todos (1950)
- Flor de sangre (1951)
- Los hijos de la calle (1951) - Manos suave
- We Maids (1951) - Manuel
- The Martyr of Calvary (1952) - Anás el Joven
- Angélica (1952) - Mario
- The Lie (1952)
- María del Mar (1952)
- I Want to Live (1953) - Secuaz de Ángel
- Mercy (1953) - Antonio
- Padre nuestro (1953) - Enrique Molina
- Dreams of Glory (1953) - Ingeniero Ricardo Rojas
- El Monstruo resucitado (1953) - Mischa
- El aguila negra en 'El vengador solitario' (1950)
- Me perderé contigo (1954)
- La venganza del Diablo (1955) - Carlos
- Sierra Baron (1958) - Lopez
- Pistolas de oro (1959)
- The Wonderful Country (1959) - (uncredited)
- La pandilla en acción (1959) - Assistante pelicula (uncredited)
- Que me maten en tus brazos (1961)
- Cazadores de cabezas (1962) - Carlos
- Servicio secreto (1962) - Locutor (uncredited)
- Dinamita Kid (1962) - Esbirro de Zarda (uncredited)
- El muchacho de Durango (1962) - Cantante
- Sangre en el ring (1962) - Gangster
- La barranca sangrienta (1962) - (uncredited)
- Santo contra el rey del crimen (1962)
- El tesoro del rey Salomón (1963) - Cazador (uncredited)
- Aventuras de las hermanas X (1963) - Renato Estrada
- Neutron vs. the Maniac (1964) - Captain Julio Fuentes
- El hijo de Gabino Barrera (1965)
- Bromas, S.A. (1967) - Rubén
- Primera comunión (1969)
- Las aventuras de Juliancito (1969) - Dr. Ramírez
- Los problemas de mamá (1970) - Director
- El sabor de la venganza (1971) - Director
- Tívoli (1974) - Alcalde
- The Return of a Man Called Horse (1976) - Red Cloud
- Chicano (1976)
- El último disparo (1985)
- El gorra prieta (1993) - (final film role)

== Bibliography ==
- Rogelio Agrasánchez. Guillermo Calles: A Biography of the Actor and Mexican Cinema Pioneer. McFarland, 2010.
