= Donde comienza la tristeza =

Mexican telenovela

- Genre: Telenovela; Drama
- Starring: Rita Macedo; Carlos Cores
- Country of origin: Mexico
- Original language: Spanish

Production
- Production locations: Mexico City, Mexico
- Running time: 42-45 minutes
- Production company: Televisa

Original release
- Network: Canal 4, Telesistema Mexicano
- Release: 1960 – 1960

Donde comienza la tristeza is a Mexican telenovela that aired on Canal 4, Telesistema Mexicano in 1960.

== Cast ==
- Rita Macedo
- Carlos Cores
- Jesús Valero

== Production ==
- Original Story: Raúl Astor
- Adaptation: Raúl Astor
- Managing Director: Rafael Banquells
