= Raúl Astor =

Mexican actor

- Born: Raúl Ignacio Spangenberg Parera; January 10, 1925; Buenos Aires, Argentina
- Died: June 22, 1995 (aged 70); Buenos Aires, Argentina
- Occupations: Actor, director, producer, announcer
- Years active: 1950–1995
- Spouse: Chela Castro (1955–1995) (his death)

Raúl Astor (January 10, 1925 – June 22, 1995), born Raúl Ignacio Spangenberg Parera, was an Argentine-born Mexican actor, director, producer and announcer.

== Personal life ==
On Christmas Day 1955, he was married to actress Chela Castro and never had children.

== Filmography ==
Actor, Screenwriter, Producer, Director
Year	Title	Role	Notes
1954	El Calavera		
1960	Donde comienza la tristeza		Producer
1960	Pecado mortal		Producer
1960	Pecado mortal		Director
1960	Pensión de mujeres		Screenwriter
1960	María Guadalupe		Screenwriter
1960	María Guadalupe		Director
1960	El hombre de oro		Screenwriter
1960	La ambiciosa		Director
1965	Perdóname mi vida	Sr. Perales	Telenovela
1966	Amor a ritmo de go go	Don Guillermo	Telenovela
1967	Mujeres, mujeres, mujeres		Episode: "El trikini colorado"
1967	Cómo pescar marido	Sr. Duarte	Telenovela
1968	Simplemente vivir		Director
1969	De turno con la angustia		Producer
1969	De turno con la angustia		Screenwriter
1969	Concierto de almas		Producer
1969	Las fieras	Don Lorenzo del Valle	Telenovela
1970	Simplemente vivir		Screenwriter
1970	La cosquilla		Telenovela
1972	Me llaman Martina Sola		Producer
1974	Fe, esperanza y caridad	Don Sandro	Telenovela
1978	Sábado loco, loco		Comedy
1982	No empujen		Telenovela
1994	El día que me quieras		Screenwriter
