= She and I (film) =

1951 film

- Directed by: Miguel M. Delgado
- Written by: Neftali Beltrán
- Produced by: Sergio Kogan
- Starring: Pedro Armendáriz; Miroslava; Francisco Fuentes
- Cinematography: Raúl Martínez Solares
- Edited by: Jorge Bustos
- Music by: José de la Vega
- Production company: Internacional Cinematográfica
- Distributed by: Clasa-Mohme
- Release date: 3 October 1951
- Running time: 88 minutes
- Country: Mexico
- Language: Spanish

She and I (Spanish: Ella y yo) is a 1951 Mexican romantic comedy drama film directed by Miguel M. Delgado and starring Pedro Armendáriz, Miroslava and Francisco Fuentes. It was shot at the Clasa Studios in Mexico City. The film's sets were designed by the art director Gunther Gerszo. It is part of the tradition of Ranchera films.

== Cast ==
- Pedro Armendáriz as Pedro Muñoz
- Miroslava as Irene Garza
- Manuel Tamés hijo as Regulo
- Francisco Fuentes as Madaleno
- Miguel Aceves Mejía as Cantante
- Consuelo Guerrero de Luna as Enedina Garza
- Alejandro Ciangherotti as Andrés
- Lupe Llaca as Lupita
- Los Xochimilcas as Grupo musical
- Eduardo Alcaraz as Agente viajero
- Enrique García Álvarez as Señor cura
- Ángel Infante as Amigo de Pedro
- Pedro Padilla as Amigo de Pedro
- Pedro Elviro as Profesor
- Conchita Gentil Arcos as Doña Tacha
- Lupe Carriles as Hermana Jiménez

== Bibliography ==
- Amador, María Luisa. Cartelera cinematográfica, 1950-1959. UNAM, 1985.
- Baugh, Scott L. Latino American Cinema: An Encyclopedia of Movies, Stars, Concepts, and Trends. ABC-CLIO, 2012.
- Berumen, Frank Javier Garcia. Brown Celluloid: 1894-1959. Vantage Press, 2003.
- Riera, Emilio García. Historia documental del cine mexicano: 1951-1952. Universidad de Guadalajara, 1992
