= They Say I'm a Communist =

1951 film

- Directed by: Alejandro Galindo
- Written by: Alejandro Galindo; Gunther Gerszo
- Produced by: César Santos Galindo
- Starring: Adalberto Martínez «Resortes» María Luisa Zea
- Cinematography: Raúl Martínez Solares
- Edited by: Fernando Martínez
- Music by: Gustavo César Carrión
- Production company: Estudios Churubusco Azteca
- Release date: 12 July 1951
- Country: Mexico
- Language: Spanish

They Say I'm a Communist (Spanish: Dicen que soy comunista) is a 1951 Mexican comedy film directed by Alejandro Galindo and starring Adalberto Martínez «Resortes» and María Luisa Zea.

== Cast ==
- Adalberto Martínez «Resortes» as Benito Reyes
- María Luisa Zea as Berta
- Miguel Manzano as Macario Carrola
- Joaquín Roche hijo as Huicho
- Charles Rooner as don Guillermo
- Salvador Quiroz as Teófilo Mendieta
- Arturo Castro 'Bigotón' as Nabor Méndez
- Jorge Arriaga as Camarada Buenaventura
- Manuel Dondé as Camarada Palomera
- Bruno Márquez as Anunciador en concurso
- Carmen Manzano as Doña Lolita
- Josefina del Mar as Olga Figueroa
- Jaime Jiménez Pons as Amigo de Huicho
- Armando Acosta as Hombre en baile
- Jorge Alzaga as Miembro del comité
- Daniel Arroyo as Cliente restaurante
- Augusto Benedico as Don Federico, jefe de Benito
- Victorio Blanco as Miembro del comité
- Lupe Carriles as Vecina
- Enrique Carrillo as Cliente fonda
- Alfonso Carti as Policía
- José Chávez as Hombre en baile
- Nacho Contla as Gildardo Molina, señor gobernador
- Enedina Díaz de León as Doña Brigida
- Jesús Garcia as Compañero Ruiz
- Emilio Garibay as Camarada
- Carmen Guillén as Mujer del censo
- Leonor Gómez as Vecina
- Chel López as Camarada Ruelas
- Jorge Martínez de Hoyos as Miembro del comité
- Pepe Martínez as Dueño fonda
- Héctor Mateos as don Pablo
- Gloria Oropeza as Vecina
- Antonio Padilla 'Pícoro' as Miembro del comité
- Ignacio Peón as Transeúnte
- José Pulido as Camarada Leobardo Tolentino
- Guillermo Ramirez as Esbirro de Guillermo
- Ignacio Retes as Francisco Rodríguez Franco
- Ángela Rodríguez as Mujer en concurso
- Gilda Selva
- Manuel Trejo Morales as Marcelo, maître d'
- Manuel 'Loco' Valdés as Hombre en baile
- Alfredo Varela padre as Cliente fonda
- Hernán Vera as don Roque

== Bibliography ==
- Rogelio Agrasánchez. Cine Mexicano: Posters from the Golden Age, 1936-1956. Chronicle Books, 2001.
