= Witch's Corner =

1949 film

- Directed by: Alberto Gout
- Written by: Alberto Gout
- Produced by: Alberto Gout
- Starring: Gloria Marín; Víctor Junco; Armando Silvestre
- Cinematography: José Ortiz Ramos
- Edited by: Alfredo Rosas Priego
- Music by: Rosalío Ramírez
- Production company: Constelación
- Release date: 2 November 1949
- Running time: 90 minutes
- Country: Mexico
- Language: Spanish

Witch's Corner (Spanish: Rincón brujo) is a 1949 Mexican drama film directed by Alberto Gout and starring Gloria Marín, Víctor Junco and Armando Silvestre. It was made at the Azteca Studios in Mexico City. The film's sets were designed by the art director José Rodríguez Granada. Location shooting took place in Chiapas in the south of Mexico.

== Synopsis ==
During the Mexican Revolution, gun runners being pursued by government forces take shelter in the town of Rincón brujo (Witch's Corner).

== Cast ==
- Gloria Marín as Rosalba
- Víctor Junco as Vicente
- Armando Silvestre as Teniente Eligio
- Dagoberto Rodríguez as Capitán Gilberto
- Arturo Soto Rangel as don Pedro
- Josefina Ortega as Chepa
- José Muñoz as Teniente Felipe Sánchez
- Cecilia Leger as Mamá de Vicente
- Beatriz Saavedra as Rosita
- Magda Monzón as Carmen

== Bibliography ==
- Alfaro, Eduardo de la Vega. Alberto Gout (1907-1966). Cineteca Nacional, 1988.
- Riera, Emilio García. Historia documental del cine mexicano: 1949. Ediciones Era, 1969.
