= Confessions of a Taxi Driver =

1949 film

- Directed by: Alejandro Galindo
- Written by: Gunther Gerszo; Alejandro Galindo
- Produced by: César Santos Galindo
- Starring: Adalberto Martínez «Resortes» Lilia Prado; Conchita Gentil Arcos; Maruja Grifell
- Cinematography: Domingo Carrillo
- Edited by: Carlos Savage
- Music by: Raúl Lavista
- Production company: Producciones Azteca
- Release date: 16 December 1949
- Running time: 100 minutes
- Country: Mexico
- Language: Spanish

Confessions of a Taxi Driver (Spanish: Confidencias de un ruletero) is a 1949 Mexican comedy film directed by Alejandro Galindo and starring Adalberto Martínez «Resortes», Lilia Prado, Conchita Gentil Arcos and Maruja Grifell.

== Cast ==
- Adalberto Martínez «Resortes» as Lauro Escamilla Cejudo
- Lilia Prado as Rosa
- Julio Villarreal as Sr. Legazpi
- Conchita Gentil Arcos as Doña Remedios
- Maruja Grifell as Madame Mimi
- Isabel del Puerto as Elizabeth de Legazpi
- Jorge Arriaga as Matón asesinado
- Elvia Salcedo as Rita
- Salvador Terroba as Pablo, chofer
- Alberto Mariscal as Constantino Escamilla Cejudo
- Manuel de la Vega as Arturo
- Jorge Martínez de Hoyos as Luis
- León Barroso as Federico
- Guillermo Bravo Sosa as Cobrador de letra
- Chela Castro as Conchita
- Nacho Contla as Comandante Godínez
- César del Campo as Empleado de Mimi
- Enedina Díaz de León as Doña Cholita
- Luis Mario Jarero as Agente 22 policía
- Beatriz Jimeno as Pasajera taxi
- Cecilia Leger as Amante casada de Rigoberto
- Miguel Manzano as Compadre de Sanchitos
- Héctor Mateos as Mayordomo de Legazpi
- Álvaro Matute as El muertito
- Kika Meyer as Pasajera taxi
- Jenaro Núñez
- José Pardavé
- Salvador Quiroz as Sanchitos, pasajero taxi
- Francisco Reiguera as Joyero
- Enrique Rosado
- Beatriz Saavedra as Mané
- María Valdealde as Sra. de Montejo, clienta de Mimi
- Armando Velasco as Agente policía

== Bibliography ==
- Rogelio Agrasánchez. Cine Mexicano: Posters from the Golden Age, 1936-1956. Chronicle Books, 2001.
