= A Day with the Devil =

1945 film

- Film poster
- Directed by: Miguel M. Delgado
- Written by: Jaime Salvador
- Produced by: Jacques Gelman; Santiago Reachi
- Starring: Mario Moreno «Cantinflas» Susana Cora; Andrés Soler; Miguel Arenas
- Cinematography: Gabriel Figueroa
- Music by: Rosalío Ramírez
- Production company: Posa Films
- Release date: 30 November 1945
- Running time: 100 minutes
- Country: Mexico
- Language: Spanish

A Day with the Devil (Spanish: Un día con el Diablo) is a 1945 Mexican comedy film directed by Miguel M. Delgado and starring Mario Moreno «Cantinflas», Susana Cora, Miguel Arenas and Andrés Soler.

== Cast ==
- Mario Moreno as Cantinflas / Juan Pérez
- Susana Cora as Coronel's daughter
- Miguel Arenas as Coronel
- Andrés Soler as Devil / Police
- Susana Cora
- Lauro Benítez
- Roberto Corell
- Manuel Dondé
- Pedro Elviro
- Juan García
- Rafael Icardo
- Pepe Nava
- Óscar Pulido
- José Eduardo Pérez
- Salvador Quiroz
- Humberto Rodríguez
- Ángel T. Sala
- Estanislao Shilinsky
- Hernán Vera as Nerón
- Roberto Cañedo

== Bibliography ==
- Stavans, Ilan. The Riddle of Cantinflas: Essays on Hispanic Popular Culture, Revised and Expanded Edition. UNM Press, 2012.
