= I Want to Live (1953 film) =

1953 film by Alberto Gout Àbrego

- Directed by: Alberto Gout
- Written by: Alberto Gout; Luis Spota
- Produced by: Rodolfo Rosas Priego
- Starring: Jorge Mistral; Meche Barba; Julio Villarreal
- Cinematography: Alex Phillips
- Edited by: Alfredo Rosas Priego
- Music by: Antonio Díaz Conde
- Production company: Rosas Films
- Release date: 29 January 1953
- Running time: 90 minutes
- Country: Mexico
- Language: Spanish

I Want to Live (Spanish: Quiero vivir) is a 1953 Mexican crime film directed by Alberto Gout and starring Jorge Mistral, Meche Barba and Julio Villarreal.

The film's sets were designed by Manuel Fontanals.

== Cast ==
- Jorge Mistral as Rubén Iturbe
- Meche Barba as Mercedes Rios
- Julio Villarreal as Comandante Rodolfo Saldívar
- Víctor Alcocer as Ángel
- Lupe Llaca as Alicia
- Celia Viveros as Angélica
- Roberto Galvez as El ronco Gómez
- Charles Rooner as Doctor
- Alberto Mariscal as Secuaz de Ángel
- Andrea Palma as Andrea
- Daniel Arroyo as Invitado a fiesta
- Manuel de la Vega as Tomás
- Enrique Díaz Indiano as Samuel, mayordomo
- Salvador Godínez as Esbirro de Ángel
- Álvaro Matute as Agente de policía
- Ángel Merino as Agente de policía
- Luis Mussot hijo as Manuel
- Salvador Quiroz as Invitado a fiesta
- Acela Vidaurri as Clara, empleada cabaret

== Bibliography ==
- María Luisa Amador. Cartelera cinematográfica, 1950–1959. UNAM, 1985.
