= Manuel Palacios (actor) =

Mexican actor

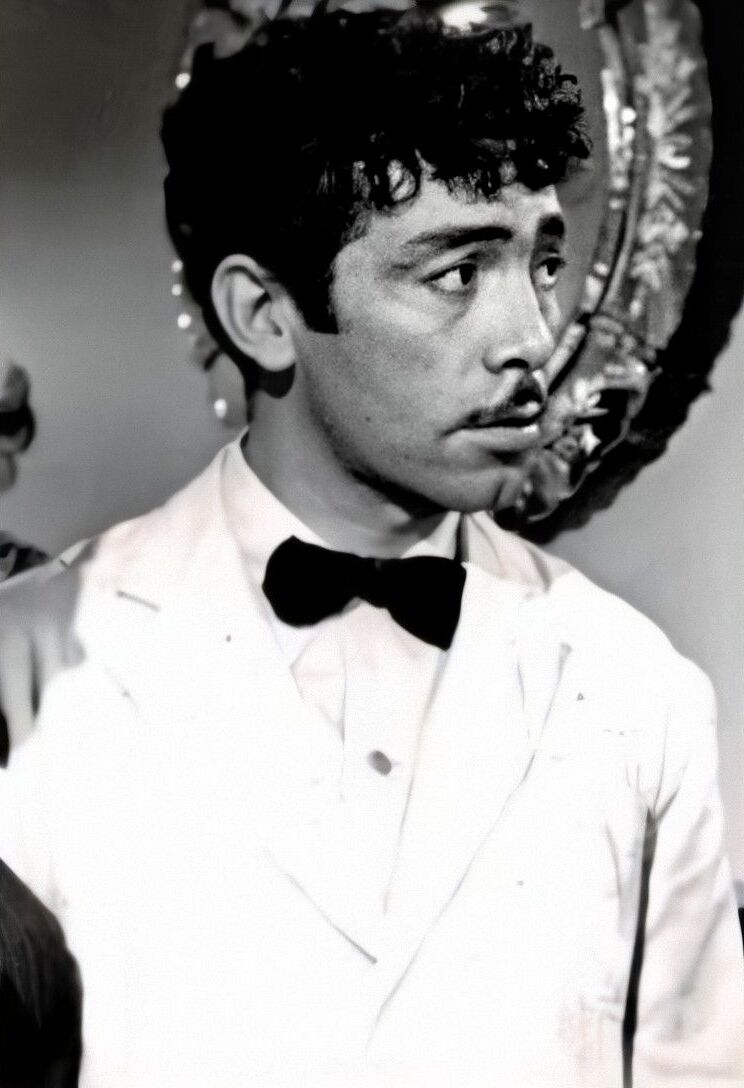
- Born: 24 May 1918; Mexico City, Mexico
- Died: 25 March 1977 (aged 58); Mexico City, Mexico
- Occupation: Actor
- Years active: 1941–1977 (film)

Manuel Palacios (1918–1977) was a Mexican comedian and film actor. Frequently known by his stage name Manolín, he worked for many years with Estanislao Shilinsky in a comedy partnership.

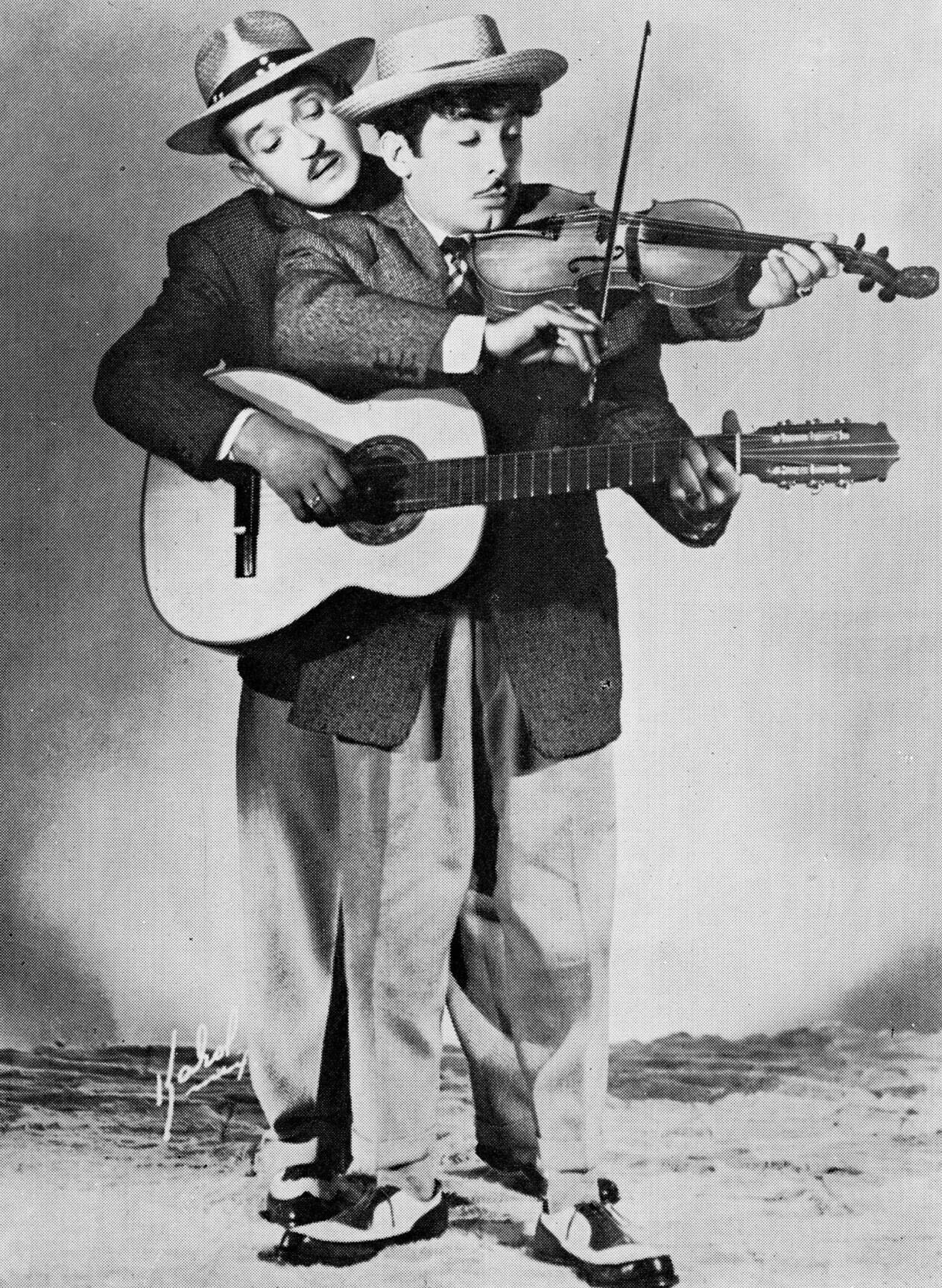
Manolín and Shilinsky in 1954

== Selected filmography ==
- ¡Ay Jalisco... no te rajes! (1941)
- Two of the Angry Life (1948)
- Fíjate qué suave (1948)
- Here Come the Freeloaders (1953)
- The Seven Girls (1955)
- Pancho López (1957)

== Bibliography ==
- Hershfield, Joanne; Maciel, David R. Mexico's Cinema: A Century of Film and Filmmakers. Rowman & Littlefield Publishers, 1999.
