= Dreams of Glory =

1953 Mexican drama film

- Directed by: Zacarías Gómez Urquiza
- Written by: Zacarías Gómez Urquiza
- Produced by: Olallo Rubio Gandara
- Starring: Miroslava; Luis Aguilar; Gloria Mange; Beatriz Saavedra
- Cinematography: Rosalío Solano
- Edited by: Carlos Savage
- Music by: Federico Baena
- Production company: Filmadora Internacional
- Release date: 10 December 1953
- Running time: 88 minutes
- Country: Mexico
- Language: Spanish

Dreams of Glory (Spanish: Sueños de gloria) is a 1953 Mexican drama film written and directed by Zacarías Gómez Urquiza, and starring Miroslava Stern, Luis Aguilar, Gloria Mange and Beatriz Saavedra. This film marked the film debut of the spanish actress and singer Elvira Quintana.

== Cast ==
- Miroslava Stern as Elsa
- Luis Aguilar as Luis de la Mora
- José Baviera as Don Guillermo Fernández
- Alberto Mariscal as Ingeniero Ricardo Rojas
- Gloria Mange as Coque
- Quintín Bulnes as Chilaquil
- Beatriz Saavedra as Esperanza
- María Herrero as Amiga de Elsa
- Javier de la Parra
- Jorge Casanova as Alberto
- Víctor Alcocer as Locutor
- Daniel Arroyo as Anunciador comienzo carrera de autos
- Manuel Casanueva as Cliente taller
- Jorge Martínez de Hoyos as Jerónimo
- Enrique Zambrano as Miembro comité organizador

== Bibliography ==
- María Luisa Amador. Cartelera cinematográfica, 1950-1959. UNAM, 1985.
