= Pensión de mujeres =

- Genre: Telenovela; Drama
- Starring: Amparo Rivelles; Fanny Schiller; Fernando Rey
- Country of origin: Mexico
- Original language: Spanish
- No. of episodes: 43

Production
- Running time: 42-45 minutes
- Production company: Televisa

Original release
- Network: Telesistema Mexicano
- Release: 1960 – 1960

Pensión de mujeres is a Mexican telenovela that aired on Telesistema Mexicano in 1960. It was the original story and adaptation of Raúl Astor. It had forty-three episodes, and starred Amparo Rivelles.

== Cast ==
- Amparo Rivelles
- Fanny Schiller
- Fernando Rey
- Mapita Cortés
- Prudencia Grifell
- Rosa Elena Durgel

== Production ==
- Original story: Raúl Astor
- Adaptation: Raúl Astor
