= Estanislao Shilinsky =

Lithuanian-born Mexican comedian

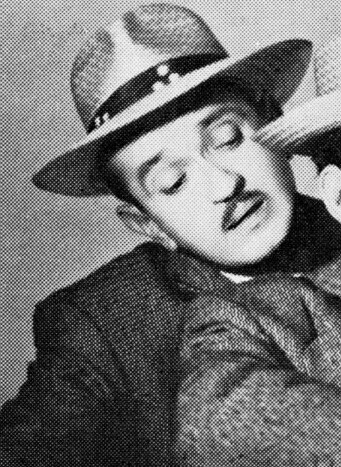
- Shilinsky in 1954
- Born: Estanislao Schillinsky Bachanska; 10 August 1911; Baisogala, Lithuania
- Died: 27 September 1985 (aged 74); Mexico City, Mexico
- Other name: Shilinsky
- Occupations: Actor, comedian and screenwriter

Estanislao Schillinsky Bachanska (10 August 1911 – 27 September 1985), known as Estanislao Shilinsky or simply Shilinsky, was a Lithuanian-born Mexican comedian and the half of the 1940–1970 comedy duo Manolín y Shilinsky with Manuel Palacios "Manolin".

== Career ==
Estanislao Shilinsky and his brother moved to Mexico as members of a Russian circus troup.

His career started in the carpa circuit when he met Grigori Ivanov who introduced him to the Carpa Valentina that he owned. In 1929 he coached Mario Moreno and helped him improve his Cantinflas character. He later married Olga Subarev, the daughter of Ivanov, while Cantinflas married her sister Valentina Ivanova who the carpa was named after.

One of Shilinsky's singular characteristics as a Mexican actor was his remnant Russian accent.

His sidekick Manuel Palacio Sierra eventually lost his voice and died in poverty in 1977.

== Filmography ==
=== As actor ===
- Don't Fool Yourself Dear (1937)
- Jengibre vs Dinamita (1939)
- Cantinflas boxeador (1940)
- Cantinflas y su prima (1940)
- Here's the Point (1940)
- The Unknown Policeman (1941)
- Neither Blood nor Sand (1941)
- The Three Musketeers (1942)
- The Circus (1942)
- Romeo and Juliet (1943)
- Gran Hotel (1944)
- A Woman's Diary (1944)
- A Day with the Devil (1945)
- Adultery (1945)
- The House of the Fox (1945)
- I Am a Fugitive (1946)
- Fly Away, Young Man! (1947)
- Fíjate que suave (1948)
- Two of the Angry Life (1948)
- Pobres pero sinvergüenzas (1949)
- Vivillo desde chiquillo (1951)
- Here Come the Freeloaders (1953)
- The Seven Girls (1955)

=== As script writer ===
- Cantinflas boxeador (1940)
- Cantinflas y su prima (1940)
- Siempre listo en las tinieblas (1939)

== Portrayals ==
Shilinsky was portrayed by Luis Gerardo Méndez in the 2014 film Cantinflas.
