= The Seven Girls =

1955 film

- Directed by: Roberto Rodríguez
- Written by: Carlos González Dueñas; Ricardo Parada de León; Roberto Rodríguez
- Produced by: Aurelio García Yévenes
- Starring: Manuel Palacios «Manolín» Estanislao Schillinsky; Rosa de Castilla
- Cinematography: Ezequiel Carrasco
- Edited by: Fernando Martínez
- Music by: Rosalío Ramírez
- Production company: Producciones Rodríguez Hermanos
- Release date: 6 January 1955
- Running time: 96 minutes
- Country: Mexico
- Language: Spanish

The Seven Girls (Spanish: Las nenas del siete) is a 1955 Mexican comedy film written and directed by Roberto Rodríguez, and starring Manolín and Shilinsky, Rosa de Castilla and Luz María Aguilar. This is the last installment of the Manolín and Shilinsky film franchise.

It was shot at the Churubusco Studios in Mexico City. The film's sets were designed by the art director Francisco Marco Chillet.

== Cast ==
- Manuel Palacios as Manolín/Don Manolo
- Estanislao Schillinsky as Schillinsky
- Rosa de Castilla as Quica
- Luz María Aguilar as Cuca
- Eduardo Alcaraz as Empresario
- Lucha Palacios as Eulalia
- José Jasso "El Ojón" as Profe
- Lupe Carriles as Doña Merencianita
- Conchita Gentil Arcos as Cholita
- Azucena Rodríguez as Raterita
- Guillermo Álvarez Bianchi as Dueño de cabaret
- Cecilia Leger as Clienta de tienda
- Francisco Pando as Abarrotero
- Enrique Carrillo as Policía
- Silvia Carrillo as Corista
- Kika Meyer as Cobradora
- Ignacio Solorzano as El cojo
- Julio Sotelo as Médico

== Bibliography ==
- Amador, María Luisa. Cartelera cinematográfica, 1950-1959. UNAM, 1985.
- Riera, Emilio García . Historia documental del cine mexicano: 1952. Ediciones Era, 1969.
