= Gloria Mange =

Mexican actress (1931–2023)

- Born: 18 June 1931; Los Angeles California, Estados Unidos.
- Died: 8 July 2023 (aged 92); Mexico City, Mexico
- Occupation: Actress
- Years active: 1950–1954 (film)

Gloria Mange Figueroa (18 June 1931 – 8 July 2023) was a Mexican film actress active during the Golden Age of Mexican cinema.

Mange died on 8 July 2023, at the age of 92.

== Selected filmography ==
- Primero soy mexicano (1950)
- A Decent Woman (1950)
- From the Can-Can to the Mambo (1951)
- Beauty Salon (1951)
- What Has That Woman Done to You? (1951)
- If I Were a Congressman (1952)
- The Wolf Returns (1952)
- The Unknown Mariachi (1953)
- Sueños de gloria (1953)

== Bibliography ==
- Emilio García Riera. Historia documental del cine mexicano: 1949-1950. Universidad de Guadalajara, 1992.
