= María Guadalupe =

Mexican telenovela

- Genre: Telenovela; Drama
- Starring: Luz María Aguilar; Guillermo Murray
- Country of origin: Mexico
- Original language: Spanish

Production
- Production locations: Mexico City, Mexico
- Running time: 42-45 minutes
- Production company: Televisa

Original release
- Network: Canal 4, Telesistema Mexicano
- Release: 1960 – 1960

María Guadalupe is a Mexican telenovela that aired on Canal 4, Telesistema Mexicano in 1960, with episodes lasting 30 minutes. Directed by and starring Raúl Astor Luz Maria Aguilar.

== Cast ==
- Luz María Aguilar as María Guadalupe
- Guillermo Murray
- Alejandro Ciangherotti
- Judy Ponte
- Antonio de Hud

== Production ==
- Original Story: Raúl Astor
- Adaptation: Raúl Astor
- Managing Director: Raúl Astor
