= To the Four Winds =

1955 film

- Directed by: Adolfo Fernández Bustamante
- Written by: Adolfo Fernández Bustamante
- Produced by: Sergio Kogan
- Starring: Rosita Quintana; Miguel Aceves Mejía; Joaquín Pardavé
- Cinematography: Víctor Herrera
- Edited by: Jorge Busto
- Music by: Federico Ruiz
- Production company: Internacional Cinematográfica
- Release date: 22 April 1955
- Running time: 94 minutes
- Country: Mexico
- Language: Spanish

To the Four Winds (Spanish: A los cuatro vientos) is a 1955 Mexican musical film directed by Adolfo Fernández Bustamante and starring Rosita Quintana, Miguel Aceves Mejía and Joaquín Pardavé. The film's sets were designed by the art director Gunther Gerzso.

== Cast ==
- Rosita Quintana as Paloma Vargas
- Miguel Aceves Mejía as Pablo Gálvez
- Joaquín Pardavé as Don Manuel, padrino
- Alberto Catalá as Empleado teatro
- Eduardo Alcaraz as Modisto
- Carlos Riquelme as Doctor
- Guillermo Álvarez Bianchi
- María Valdealde as Asistente camerino de Paloma
- Patricia de Morelos as Acompañante celosa de Emilio
- Eva Calvo as Amante de Pablo
- Norma Ancira as Luz, cantante
- René Cardona as Don Emilio

== Bibliography ==
- María Luisa Amador. Cartelera cinematográfica, 1950-1959. UNAM, 1985.
