= School for Tramps =

- Directed by: Rogelio A. González
- Written by: adapted by Fernando de Fuentes from 1938 screenplay by John Jevne
- Produced by: Fernando de Fuentes
- Starring: Pedro Infante; Miroslava Stern; Blanca de Castejón; Oscar Pulido; Anabelle Gutiérrez
- Cinematography: Rosalío Solano
- Edited by: José W. Bustos
- Music by: Manuél Esperón
- Distributed by: Diana Films (1955 release); Televisa Home Entertainment (DVD release)
- Release date: 27 January 1955
- Running time: 100 minutes
- Country: Mexico
- Language: Spanish

School for Tramps (Spanish: Escuela de vagabundos) is a 1955 Mexican comedy film produced and written by Fernando de Fuentes, directed by Rogelio A. González and starring Pedro Infante, Miroslava Stern, Blanca de Castejón, Oscar Pulido and Anabelle Gutiérrez. It's considered one of the finest comedies of Mexican cinema, and is adapted from the screenplay for the MGM movie Merrily We Live (1938).

== Plot ==
In a mansion outside a nameless city (apparently Mexico City), lives the wealthy Valverde family: the patriarch Miguel (Oscar Pulido) a businessman; Emilia (Blanca de Castejón), his wife, a fun and good-hearted but slightly deranged woman; and their two daughters: the oldest, Susi, short for Susana, (Miroslava) and Lala, a nickname for Laura (Anabelle Gutiérrez). Emilia often picks up tramps in the hope of reforming them into productive men, but they always disappear after stealing anything they can in the house.

Alberto Medina (Pedro Infante), a famous songwriter, is on a vacation hunting trip in the surrounding woods. The old car he's driving starts heating up and shooting vapor through the radiator; Alberto gets out of the car to search for water. The car then starts going downhill in reverse until it falls off a cliff and gets destroyed, so he has to walk to find help and ends up in Valverde's home, asking to make a phone call; because of his dirty and ragged clothes, Emilia takes him for a tramp and invites him to stay with them. After catching a glimpse of Susi (Miroslava), Alberto accepts, despite the protests of Emilia's family and their butler Audifás. In the following days, he proves to be more than a regular homeless man: helping Miguel when he arrives home drunk, enchanting the heart of Susi, and especially during a business dinner where he secures Miguel's financial investment support from a bank manager but also making Susi jealous after the manager's daughter, Patricia, insists on dating him the next day.

Alberto ends up having a date with Patricia, first at a country club and later at an undisclosed place. During that day, two patrolmen find the destroyed car in the wreckage and find the owner, who confirms that Alberto was driving the vehicle, and they assume he died in the accident. Later that night, Alberto goes back to the Valverde's and, realizing he has no key falls asleep in the back room. The following day when they look for Alberto, they don't find him in the bedroom, then Miguel reads a note in the newspaper where they are informed he died in a car accident, causing a chaotic chain of faints and madness around the house. During the confusion, Alberto finally finds Susi (who fainted first). He kisses her declaring their love after being briefly interrupted by Audifás, who becomes a tramp after seeing all the luck they have.

== Cast ==
- Pedro Infante – Alberto Medina
- Miroslava – Suzi Valverde
- Oscar Pulido – Miguel Valverde
- Blanca de Castejón – Emilia de Valverde
- Anabelle Gutiérrez – Lala Valverde
- Oscar Ortiz de Pinedo – Humberto Vértiz
- Eduardo Alcaraz – Audifás, the Butler
- Fernando Casanova – Mauricio
- Liliana Durán – Patricia Vértiz
- Ramón Valdés – Taxista
- Dolores Camarillo – Pancha, a Servant

== Reception and legacy ==
The film met with positive reviews from contemporary critics upon release and proved a commercial success.

During the 1955 Ariel Awards, the film won two Silver Ariels, one for Best Supporting Actress (Blanca de Castejón) and one for Best Young Actress (Anabelle Gutiérrez).

It is considered one of the most beloved comedy films of all time and is often broadcast on television. It has the distinction to be the last film premiered during Miroslava's lifetime; she committed suicide five weeks after the film opened.

== Music ==
Pedro Infante sang five songs in this movie:

Song	Author	Singer
Cucurrucucú paloma	Tomás Méndez S.	Pedro Infante
¿Quién será?	Pablo Beltrán Ruiz	Pedro Infante
Grito prisionero	Gabriel Ruiz Galindo and L. de la Fuente	Pedro Infante
Nana Pancha	Fernando Estenoz, Miguel Medina and Antonio Medina	Pedro Infante
Dumont y Lucrecia	Federico Curiel and Rosendo Ruiz	Pedro Infante
