= La casa de las fieras =

Mexican telenovela

- Genre: Telenovela
- Country of origin: Mexico
- Original language: Spanish

Original release
- Network: Telesistema Mexicano
- Release: 1967

La casa de las fieras is a Mexican telenovela produced by Teleprogramas Acapulco, SA and originally transmitted by Telesistema Mexicano.

== Cast ==
- Lucy Gallardo
- Rita Macedo
- Beatriz Baz
- Alicia Bonet
