= Añoranza =

Mexican telenovela

- Genre: Telenovela
- Created by: Mimí Bechelani
- Directed by: Martha Zavaleta
- Starring: Marga López; Jorge Lavat
- Country of origin: Mexico
- Original language: Spanish
- No. of episodes: 20

Production
- Executive producer: Irene Sabido
- Cinematography: Karlos Velázquez

Original release
- Network: Canal de las Estrellas
- Release: 1979

Añoranza is a Mexican telenovela produced by Irene Sabido for Televisa in 1979.

== Cast ==
- Marga López
- Jorge Lavat
- Jaime Garza
- Dolores Beristáin
- María Rojo
- Varelita
- Erika Buenfil
- José Flores
