= Here Come the Freeloaders =

1953 film

- Directed by: Gilberto Martínez Solares
- Written by: Juan García; Gilberto Martínez Solares
- Produced by: Jesús Grovas
- Starring: Antonio Espino «Clavillazo» Lilia del Valle; Manuel Palacios «Manolín» Estanislao Schillinsky; Eulalio González «Piporro» Fernando Soto «Mantequilla» Yolanda Montes «Tongolele» Verónica Loyo; Celia Viveros; Amparo Arozamena; José René Ruiz «Tun-Tun»
- Cinematography: Jorge Stahl Jr.
- Edited by: Gloria Schoemann
- Music by: Manuel Esperón
- Production company: Cinematográfica Grovas
- Release date: 2 April 1953
- Running time: 93 minutes
- Country: Mexico
- Language: Spanish

Here Come the Freeloaders (Spanish: Ahí vienen los gorrones) is a 1953 Mexican comedy film directed by Gilberto Martínez Solares and starring Antonio Espino «Clavillazo», Manuel Palacios «Manolín», Estanislao Schillinsky, Eulalio González «Piporro», Fernando Soto «Mantequilla», Lilia del Valle, Verónica Loyo, Celia Viveros, Amparo Arozamena y Yolanda Montes «Tongolele» with José René Ruiz «Tun-Tun».

== Cast ==
- Lilia del Valle as Rosita Rios
- Antonio Espino «Clavillazo» as Martín
- Manuel Palacios «Manolín» as Aniceto
- Estanislao Schillinsky as Miguel Hernández
- Fernando Soto «Mantequilla» as Cachetes
- Yolanda Montes «Tongolele» as Bailarina
- Verónica Loyo as Lola
- Celia Viveros as Eufrosina
- Juan García as Don Octaviano
- Elisa Berumen as Doña Febronia
- Los Tatos
- Amparo Arozamena as Artemisa
- Diana Ochoa as Mujer busca nodriza
- Armando Arriola as Gonzalo
- Federico Curiel «Pichirilo» as Abogado
- Eulalio González «Piporro» as Comisario
- Ildefonso Sánchez Curiel
- Dumbo y Yáñez
- Petrolini
- Ismael Larumbe as Actor en escena
- Carlos Sánchez Hurtado
- Chel López
- José René Ruiz «Tun-Tun» as Pequeño César

== Bibliography ==
- María Luisa Amador. Cartelera cinematográfica, 1950-1959. UNAM, 1985.
