= Hermanos Coraje =

Mexican television series

- Genre: Telenovela
- Created by: Janete Clair
- Directed by: Martin Clutet
- Starring: Jaime Fernández; Fernando Larrañaga; Jorge Lavat
- Country of origin: Mexico
- Original language: Spanish

Production
- Executive producer: José P. Delfin

Original release
- Network: Televisión Independiente de México
- Release: 1972

Hermanos Coraje is a Mexican telenovela produced by José P. Delfin for Televisión Independiente de México in 1972.

== Cast ==
- Jaime Fernández as Juan Coraje
- Fernando Larrañaga as Lalo Coraje
- Jorge Lavat as Jeronimo Coraje
- Julissa as Clara Barros /Diana Lemos / Marcia
- Edna Necoechea as Rita Massiel de Coraje
- Gloria Marin as Josefa
- Ana Luisa Pelufo as Mamá Ana Coraje
- Pilar Sen as Margarita Rosa de Castilla
- Sonia Amelio as Lina
- Luis Aragón
- Carlos Riquelme
- Luis Miranda
- Jorge Mistral as Pedro Barros #1
- Armando Calvo as Pedro Barros #2
- Pedro Armendáriz Jr.
- Rita Macedo
- Emma Roldán as Dominga
- Victor Alcocer
- Carmelita González
- Aurora Clavel
- Yerye Beirute
- Ada Carrasco
- Carlos Cardona
- Jaime Vega as Comisario
- Ramiro Hernández A
