= Miroslava Stern =

Mexican actress

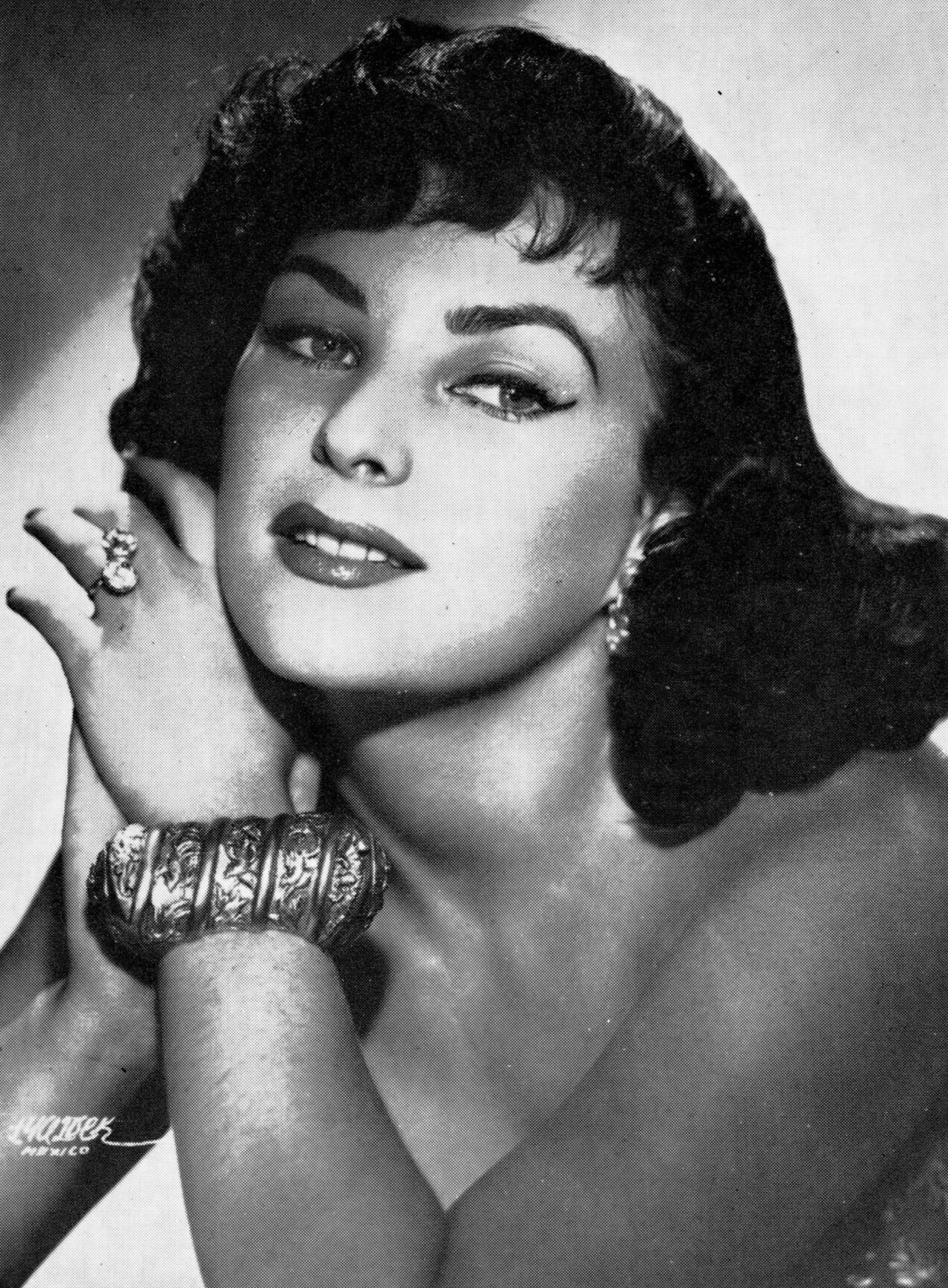
- Stern in 1954
- Born: Miroslava Stanclová; 26 February 1926; Prague, Czechoslovakia
- Died: 9 March 1955 (aged 29); Mexico City, Mexico
- Resting place: Panteón Francés de San Joaquín; Mexico City, Mexico
- Other names: Miroslava Šternová; Miroslava Stern
- Spouse: Jesús Jaime Obregón

Miroslava Šternová (née Stanclová; 26 February 1926 – 9 March 1955), known mononymously as Miroslava, was a Mexican actress.

== Biography ==
Born in interwar Prague as Miroslava Stanclová, her father died and she was adopted by a Jewish doctor, the psychoanalyst Dr. Oskar Leo Stern (1900–1972) who married her mother, Miroslava (née Becka; 1898–1945), and became known as Miroslava Šternová. Dr Stern and his wife had a son, Ivo (1931–2011), the actress's half-brother. The family was, at one point, interned in a concentration camp after they fled their native Czechoslovakia in 1939. They sought refuge in various Scandinavian countries before emigrating to Mexico in 1941. Her mother died of cancer four years later.

After winning a national beauty contest, Miroslava began to study acting. She worked steadily in films produced in Mexico, from 1946 to 1955, as well as three Hollywood films during that period. She filmed her last Mexican film, Ensayo de un crimen (The Criminal Life of Archibaldo de la Cruz), in 1955, directed by Luis Buñuel. Stranger on Horseback with Joel McCrea marked her last Hollywood film appearance.

== Death ==
Miroslava died by suicide in March 1955 by overdosing on sleeping pills, her body found lying outstretched over her bed. According to Miroslava's friends, she had a portrait of bullfighter Luis Miguel Dominguín in one hand, and they stated that her suicide was due to unrequited love for Dominguín, who had recently married Italian actress Lucia Bosè. Others, such as actress Katy Jurado, claimed that the picture that Miroslava had between her hands was of Mexican comedian Cantinflas and that her unrequited love was for Cantinflas, but her artistic manager Fanny Schatz exchanged the photo for that of the Dominguín. Jurado based this claiming she was the first to find the body; another source states that her body was found by actress Ninón Sevilla. Despite a lack of evidence to support it, a rumor persisted that she actually died in a plane crash when traveling with Mexican businessman Jorge Pasquel, and her body was moved to her bedroom and made to look like a suicide.

In his 1983 autobiography, Mon dernier soupir (My Last Breath), Buñuel called Miroslava's cremation following her suicide ironic, as in a scene in Ensayo de un crimen, her last film, the protagonist cremates a wax reproduction of her character. Her life is the subject of a short story by Guadalupe Loaeza, which was adapted by Alejandro Pelayo for his 1992 Mexican film called Miroslava, starring Arielle Dombasle.

== Filmography ==
=== Mexico ===
==== Documentaries ====
- El charro inmortal (1955)
- Torero (1956)

==== Feature films ====
- Tragic Wedding (1946) as Amparo
- Five Faces of Woman (1947) as Beatriz
- Fly Away, Young Man! (1947) as María
- Juan Charrasqueado (1947) as María
- Nocturne of Love (1948) as Marta Reyes
- Adventure in the Night (1948) as Elena
- Adventures of Casanova (1948) as Cassandra's sister
- Secreto entre mujeres (1948) as Claudia
- La liga de las muchachas (1949) as Marta
- La posesión (1949) as Rosaura
- The Little House (1950) as Lucila del Castillo
- La muerte enamorada (1950) as Tacia, la muerte
- Monte de piedad (1950) as Elena
- Streetwalker (1951) as Elena
- Cárcel de mujeres (1951) as Evangelina Ocampo
- She and I (1951) as Irene Garza
- El puerto de los siete vicios (1951) as Colomba
- Dos caras tiene el destino (1951) as Anita
- The Magnificent Beast (1952) as Meche
- Sueños de gloria (1952) as Elsa
- Música, mujeres y amor (1952) as Elisa Méndez
- The Three Perfect Wives (1953) as Leopoldina
- Más fuerte que el amor (1953) as Bárbara
- El monstruo resucitado (1953) as Nora
- Reportaje (1953) as Nurse
- La visita que no tocó el timbre (1954) as Emma
- Escuela de vagabundos (1954) as Susana o Susi
- Ensayo de un crimen (1955) as Lavinia

=== United States ===
- Adventures of Casanova (1948) as Cassandra's sister
- The Brave Bulls (1951) as Linda de Calderón
- Stranger on Horseback (1955) as Amy Lee Bannerman

== See also ==
- Foreign-born artists in Mexico

== Sources ==
- Agrasánchez Jr., Rogelio (2001). Bellezas del cine mexicano/Beauties of Mexican Cinema. Archivo Fílmico Agrasánchez. ISBN 968-5077-11-8.
