= Susana Cora =

Mexican actress

- Occupation: Actress
- Years active: 1938–1972 (film)

Susana Cora was a Mexican film actress. She appeared in eighteen films, mostly during the Golden Age of Mexican cinema where she appeared in mixture of leading and supporting roles. She was the daughter of General Luis Amezcua and married Charles (Chick) Hill, the brother of Virginia Hill, the last girlfriend of Bugsy Siegel.

== Selected filmography ==
- With Villa's Veterans (1939)
- Jesusita in Chihuahua (1942)
- Cuando habla el corazón (1943)
- A Day with the Devil (1945)
- Adventure in the Night (1948)

== Bibliography ==
- Vogel, Michelle. Lupe Velez: The Life and Career of Hollywood's "Mexican Spitfire". McFarland, 2012.
