= El hombre de oro =

Mexican telenovela

- Genre: Telenovela; Drama
- Starring: Rafael Banquells; Magda Guzmán; Angelines Fernández
- Country of origin: Mexico
- Original language: Spanish

Production
- Running time: 42-45 minutes
- Production company: Televisa

Original release
- Network: Canal 4, Telesistema Mexicano
- Release: 1960 – 1960

El hombre de oro is a Mexican telenovela that aired on Canal 4, Telesistema Mexicano in 1960.

== Cast ==
- Rafael Banquells
- Magda Guzmán
- Angelines Fernández
- Beatriz Aguirre
- María Idalia
- Carlos Navarro

== Production ==
- Original Story: Raúl Astor
- Adaptation: Raúl Astor
