= My Husband =

1951 film

- Directed by: Jaime Salvador
- Written by: Jaime Salvador
- Based on: El Caballero Audaz by José María Carretero
- Produced by: Modesto Pascó
- Starring: Armando Calvo; Rita Macedo; Dalia Íñiguez
- Cinematography: Agustín Jiménez
- Edited by: Carlos Savage
- Music by: Alfredo A. González
- Distributed by: Clasa-Mohme
- Release date: 9 February 1951
- Running time: 98 minutes
- Country: Mexico
- Language: Spanish

My Husband (Spanish: Mi marido) is a 1951 Mexican comedy film directed by Jaime Salvador and starring Armando Calvo, Rita Macedo and Dalia Íñiguez. The film's sets were designed by the art director Ramón Rodríguez Granada.

== Synopsis ==
Isabel is besieged by suitors and to get some peace she applies to a matrimonial agency to find her a husband in name only. They produce a composer Gustavo who agrees to the arrangement in exchange for her financial support for his career. However, when he enjoys success and becomes close to the singer Gloria, Isabel considers a divorce.

== Cast ==
- Armando Calvo as Gustavo Duarte y Luque
- Rita Macedo as Isabel
- Dalia Íñiguez as Luisa
- Armando Soto La Marina as Don Sebastián
- Esmeralda as Gloria
- Carlos Valadez as Romero
- Juan Calvo as Juan, eposo de Luisa
- Roberto Meyer as Don Julián, licenciado
- Luz María Núñez as Admiradora de Gustavo
- Elodia Hernández as Beatriz, sirvienta
- Manuel Sánchez Navarro as Maître d'
- Daniel Arroyo as Invitado a boda
- Lupe Carriles as Sirvienta poco atractiva
- Pedro Elviro as Marido prospecto económico

== Bibliography ==
- Riera, Emilio García. Historia documental del cine mexicano: 1949. Ediciones Era, 1969.
- Wilt, David E. The Mexican Filmography, 1916 through 2001. McFarland, 2024.
