= Jorge Lavat =

Mexican actor (1933–2011)

- Born: Jorge Lavat Bayona; 3 August 1933; Mexico City, Mexico
- Died: 14 September 2011 (aged 78); Mexico City, Mexico
- Occupation: Actor
- Years active: 1958–2011
- Spouse: Rebeca Manríquez
- Children: 4; including: Adriana Lavat

Jorge Lavat Bayona (3 August 1933 − 14 September 2011) was a Mexican film and television actor.

== Life and work ==
Born in Mexico City, Mexico, he appeared in more than 25 serialized telenovelas over the decades between 1958 and 2001, including his participation in Senda prohibida, the first telenovela ever produced in Mexico. He was also known for his recordings combining music and the spoken word, particularly a single he released for the essay-poem Desiderata.

He was married four times: first with Ana María Torres, then with Silvia Burgos, his third marriage was once again with Ana María Torres and finally he was the husband of the actress Rebeca Manríquez. He had two sons and two daughters. One of them, Adriana Lavat, also became an actress. He is also related to the Mexican telenovela actress Queta Lavat, his sister, and his brother, José Lavat, was also an actor and voice actor

== Death ==
He died on September 14, 2011; after a back operation, he suffered a severe infection; he was kept in a coma and was never able to recover. He died from complications of a respiratory infection in a Mexico City hospital; his remains were cremated.

== Filmography ==
=== Films ===
Year	Title	Role	Notes
1958	A Thousand and One Nights		
1959	El que con niños se acuesta	Empleado de Chon	Uncredited
1959	Dos corazones y un cielo	Representante de auditorio	Uncredited
1961	El proceso de las señoritas Vivanco	Empleado hotel	Uncredited
1961	Chicas casaderas	Policía	
1961	Azahares rojos		
1963	Una joven de 16 años		Uncredited
1964	Napoleoncito	Marcos	
1964	El gallo de oro	Jugador de cartas	
1965	Los chicos de la noche	Padre adoptivo de Gabriela	
1965	¡Ay, Jalisco, no te rajes!	Juan	
1965	Especialista en chamacas		
1966	La Valentina	Erasmo	
1967	Qué hombre tan sin embargo	Amigo de Raúl	Uncredited
1967	Domingo salvaje		
1968	El escapulario	Capitán	
1968	Cuatro hombres marcados		
1969	Flor marchita	Bernardo Molina	
1969	La marcha de Zacatecas	Capitán Agustín Tovar	
1969	Las impuras	Capitán	
1969	El aviso inoportuno	Cliente gasolineria	
1969	El criado malcriado	Alejandro	
1970	La hermanita Dinamita	Dr. Miranda	
1970	Las figuras de arena		
1971	Rosario	Lorenzo	
1971	El ídolo		
1971	Yesenia	Osvaldo	
1971	Secreto de confesión	Esteban	
1971	Dos mujeres y un hombre	Mario Christie	
1972	La criada bien criada	Ricardo Montes	
1972	Sucedió en Jalisco	Cornelio	
1972	Triángulo	Miguel Escontria	
1972	La gatita	Daniel	
1973	Besos, besos y más besos		Segment: "Dos veces por semana"
1973	Santo y el águila real	Manuel Villafuerte	
1973	La tigresa	Manuel Villafuerte	
1974	Algo es algo dijo el diablo		
1975	Eva, ¿qué hace ese hombre en tu cama?	César	
1977	Sor Tequila	Ignacio	
1978	Duro pero seguro	Armando Flores	
1980	El perdón de la hija de nadie		
1981	La Jorobada		
1981	La casa prohibida		
1982	Vividores de mujeres		
1983	Las modelos de desnudos		
1983	El amor es un juego extraño		
1984	El billetero		
1985	La caravana de la muerte	Elmo	
1985	Los malvivientes		
1985	Los guaruras		
1991	Infamia		
1992	Inventando un crimen	Christián González	
2009	El estudiante	Chano	
2010	Marcelino, pan y vino	Fray Malo	

=== Television ===
Year	Title	Role	Notes
1958	Senda prohibida		Television debut
1964	Corona de lágrimas		
1965	Un grito en la obscuridad		
1966	La sombra del pecado		
1967	El usurpador		
1967	Obsesión		
1967	Deborah		
1967	Anita de Montemar		
1968	Cynthia		
1968	Cruz de amor	Marcos Belmar	
1969	Una plegaria en el camino	Roberto	
1969	La familia		
1969	De turno con la angustia		
1970	Yesenia	Oswaldo Leroux	
1970	La constitución	Jaime López	
1971	Cristo negro		
1972	Hermanos Coraje	Jeronimo Coraje	Lead role
1973	El honorable Señor Valdez	Héctor	
1976	Mi hermana la nena	Jorge	
1978	Julia		
1979	Añoranza		
1981	El periquillo sangriento		
1982	Lo que el cielo no perdona		
1983	El amor ajeno	Charlie	
1986	Monte calvario	Armando	
1987	Yesenia		
1987	Quinceañera	Roberto Villanueva	
1991	Muchachitas	Guillermo Sánchez-Zúñiga	
1998	Perla	César	
1999	La vida en el espejo	Don Omar	
2001	Cara o cruz	Melchor Hidalgo	
2002	La Virgen de Guadalupe	Agustin Xolotl	TV mini-series
2008	La historia detrás del mito	Himself	TV series documentary
2010	Vidas al límite	Himself	Episode: "El jugoso negocio del refrito"
2010	Grandes finales de telenovelas	Roberto Villanueva	Archive footage
2010	Eva Luna	Julio Arisméndi	
