= Jacques Gelman =

Mexican film producer

- Born: San Petersburgo, Russia

Jacques Gelman (1909 or 1911 – July 22, 1986) was a producer of Mexican films and a collector of Mexican Art.

Gelman was born in Saint Petersburg, Russia to a rich Jewish family who emigrated to Germany during the October Revolution (1917) . During the 1920s, he worked as a still photographer in Europe at a motion picture studios, and became a distributor of French films. He arrived in Mexico just before the outbreak of World War II, and as a result of the conflict, found himself stranded there. In 1943, he became the third partner of Posa Films, along with Mario Moreno and Santiago Reachi Fayad. The company's prime asset was Moreno's (Cantiflas) comedic talent, and the three partners crafted and marketed the image of Cantinflas. It was Gelman who proposed the recreation of European classics as a way to appeal to audiences outside Latin America. Los tres mosqueteros and Romeo y Julieta were produced during this period, and Los tres mosqueteros was selected to be screened at the first Cannes Film Festival in 1946. The endorsement of Charlie Chaplin secured the feature's billing, but in the eyes of French critics it failed to live up to Chaplin's proclamation that Moreno was the leading comic of the era. The public however, were not as hostile to "Cantinflas", seeing in him a Mexican version of their Fernandel. In 1958, a rift between Gelman and Reachi concerning some issues in contracts with Columbia Pictures by Gelman and Moreno, allowed Gelman to produce the film without Reachi as a producer, dubbing it into French over the objections of Reachi who warned him about the possible poor reception of Moreno's dialect by Europeans. The imitative efforts at universalization failed to appeal to non-Spanish-speaking audiences.

Gelman stood alongside Moreno throughout his career, accompanying him during the filming of Around the World in 80 Days and to the Golden Globe Awards. When the three partners separated in 1960 over the creation of Pepe and Reachi formed a new company named Posa Films Internacional, S.A. 1959, all assets of Posa Films, S.A and its obligations werre transferred to the new company in 1961. After Reachi retired as producer, president and partner of Posa Films INTERNACIONAL S.A. in 1963, Gelman had the opportunity to change his status as a manager to a new producer of Cantinflas movies.

Jacques Gelman died on July 22, 1986, in Houston, Texas, where he was undergoing a heart operation.

He and his wife Natasha were avid collectors of Mexican art, and became its patrons when they commissioned Diego Rivera to paint her portrait. Mexican painter Gunther Gerzso, a friend of Gelman, painted his portrait and gave it to him as a gift. Upon Mrs. Gelman's death in 1998, their collection was donated to the Metropolitan Museum of Art, New York, and has since been exhibited at the Seattle Art Museum and New York City's Museo del Pueblo. A great part of their collection is also on exhibit in the newly founded museum "Muros" in Cuernavaca, Mexico, following Natasha Gelman's wish.

== Selected filmography ==
- A Day with the Devil (1945)
