= Francisco Reiguera =

Spanish actor (1899–1969)

- Born: Francisco Reiguera Pérez; November 9, 1899; Madrid, Spain
- Died: March 15, 1969 (aged 69); Mexico City, Mexico
- Occupation: Actor

Francisco Reiguera Pérez (November 9, 1899 – March 15, 1969) was a Spanish actor, long based in Mexico. He was known as a character actor during the Golden Age of Mexican Cinema, as well as for playing the title role in Orson Welles’ unfinished film version of Don Quixote.

== Life and career ==
Born in Madrid in 1899, Reiguera began his acting career at the age of 8 in the Arte Español theatre company. The Cineteca Nacional de Mexico states he worked as a bit part actor and extra during the silent era in Europe and Hollywood, making his debut in the 1913 French film Germinal. However, these credits are not well-documented.

At some point residing in Paris, he emigrated to Mexico in 1940 shortly before the Nazi German occupation of France. Reiguera became a prolific and well-known character actor during the Golden Age of Mexican Cinema, appearing in over 100 films between 1942 and 1969. He worked with many of the major directors of Mexican cinema, including Luis Buñuel, Emilio Fernández, and Fernando Cortés. He also wrote screenplays and directed two films: 1944's Yo soy usted (featuring Amparo Arozamena) and 1954's Ofrenda (with Carlos López Moctezuma and Carmelita González).

In 1957, Reiguera was cast by Orson Welles to play the title character in his never-to-completed film adaptation of Don Quixote. Principal photography took place on-and-off between 1957 and 1969. By 1968, the ailing Reiguera asked Welles to finish shooting his scenes before his health gave out. Shortly after his scenes were completed, Reiguera died. Spanish filmmaker and former Welles collaborator Jesús Franco released a version of the project in 1992.

== Selected filmography ==
- The Noiseless Dead (1946)
- Arsène Lupin (1947)
- Don't Marry My Wife (1947)
- You Have the Eyes of a Deadly Woman (1947)
- Adventure in the Night (1948)
- Beau Ideal (1948)
- Marked Cards (1948)
- Nocturne of Love (1948)
- The Genius (1948)
- Tender Pumpkins (1949)
- Confessions of a Taxi Driver (1949)
- Hypocrite (1949)
- The Brave Bulls (1951)
- Beauty Salon (1951)
- Kill Me Because I'm Dying! (1951)
- Engagement Ring (1951)
- Tenement House (1951)
- Snow White (1952)
- Las locuras de Tin-Tan (1952)
- You've Got Me By the Wing (1953)
- The Black Pirates (1954)
- Asesinos, S.A. (1957)
- Juan Polainas (1960)
- Three Black Angels (1960)
- Chucho el Roto (1960)
- The Phantom of the Operetta (1960)
- Juan Polainas (1960)
- Pegando con tubo (1961)
- Viva Maria (1965)
- Tarzan and the Valley of Gold (1966)
- Guns for San Sebastian (1968)
- Shark! (1969; posthumous release)
