= Pedro Elviro =

Spanish actor (died 1971)

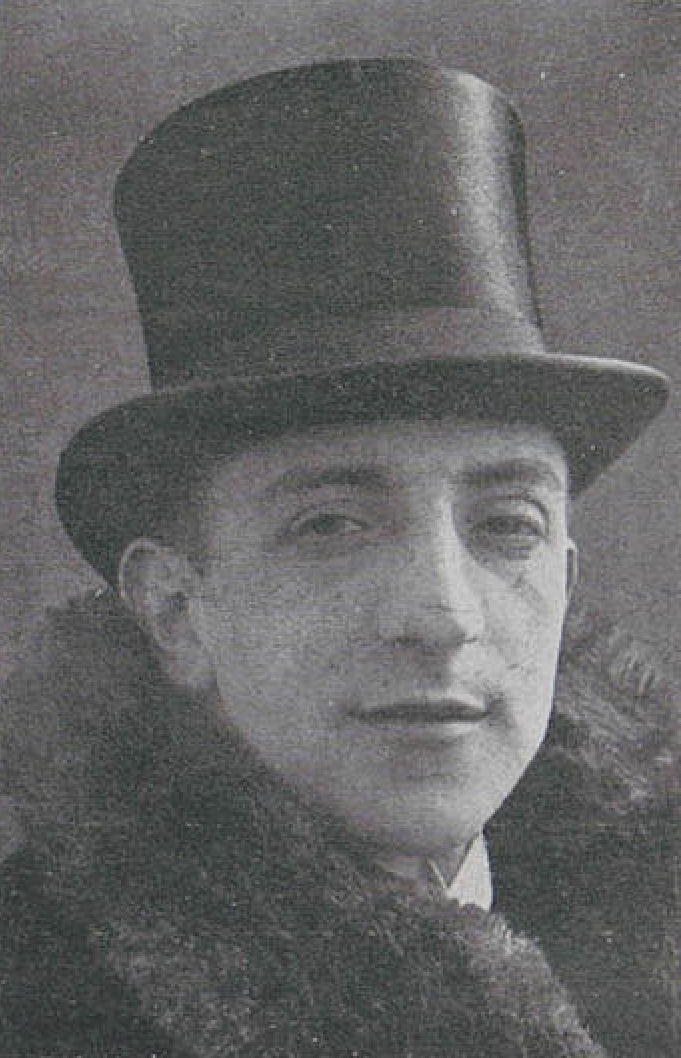
- Born: Pedro Elviro Rodríguez; Valencia de Alcántara, Spain
- Died: 24 August 1971; Mexico
- Other name: Pitouto
- Occupation: Actor

Pedro Elviro Rodríguez (died 24 August 1971), also known as Pitouto, was a Spanish actor. He appeared in more than 170 films, released between 1924 and 1972, a large part of them in France and Mexico.

== Selected filmography ==
- The Darling of Paris (1931) as Author's assistant
- Le Million (1931) as Stage manager
- Mistigri (1931)
- The Unknown Singer (1931)
- The Train of Suicides (1931) as Nobody, the clown
- A Gentleman in Tails (1931)
- The Woman Dressed As a Man (1932)
- The Champion Cook (1932) as Achille
- Sailor's Song (1932) as Jeff
- The Picador (1932)
- Fog (1932)
- Ciboulette (1933) as Arthur et Meyer
- High and Low (1933) as Bretzel, the sweeper
- Le Roi des Champs-Élysées (1934)
- Last Hour (1934)
- The Crisis is Over (1934) as Hercule
- La Bandera (1935) as Floor boy
- Rigolboche (1936)
- Maria of the Night (1936)
- Paid Holidays (1938)
- The Puritan (1938) as Security Officer
- The Unknown Policeman (1941) as Secuaz de Riquelme
- The Three Musketeers (1942) as Mesero / Posadero
- The Circus (1943)
- Romeo and Juliet (1943)
- The Daughter of the Regiment (1944)
- Mischievous Susana (1945) as Mesero
- A Day with the Devil (1945)
- Boom in the Moon (1946)
- Love Makes Them Crazy (1946)
- María Magdalena: Pecadora de Magdala (1946) as Man mocking Jesus
- I Am a Fugitive (1946) as Esbirro chaparro del jefe
- Five Faces of Woman (1947) as Gendarme
- The Private Life of Mark Antony and Cleopatra (1947) as Ministro Egipcio
- Fly Away, Young Man! (1947) as Periodista
- The Golden Boat (1947) as Empleado de Chabela
- Two of the Angry Life (1948) as Pantaleon
- The Newlywed Wants a House (1948) as Tío Urbano
- Reina de reinas: La Virgen María (1948) as Man mocking Jesus
- The Genius (1948) as Empleado corte
- The Lady of the Veil (1949) as Man in court
- The Doorman (1950) as Don Fortino
- Over the Waves (1950) as Levy, prestamist
- Serenade in Acapulco (1951) Huesped hotel
- Full Speed Ahead (1951) as Mendigo
- Red Fury (1951) as Miembro de la corte
- My Husband (1951)
- She and I (1951) as Profesor
- If I Were a Congressman (1952) as Amigo del barbero
- Mexican Bus Ride (1952)
- The Atomic Fireman (1952) as Secretario
- Mercy (1953) as Limosnero
- The Bachelors (1953)
- Pepe the Bull (1953) as Abogado
- The Photographer (1953) as Novio fotografiado
- A Tailored Gentleman (1954) as Secretario de comisaría
- Bluebeard as Empleado de don Agustín
- Puss Without Boots (1957) as Hombre en estadio
- Sube y baja (1959)
- Rebel Without a House (1960) as Cuidador
- Pegando con tubo (1961)
- Un Quijote sin mancha (1969)
