= Se solicitan modelos =

- Directed by: Chano Urueta
- Written by: Ernesto Cortázar, Eduardo Galindo
- Starring: Sara Montiel; Raúl Martínez
- Cinematography: Ignacio Torres
- Edited by: José W. Bustos
- Music by: Gonzalo Curiel
- Release date: 1954
- Country: Mexico
- Language: Spanish

Se solicitan modelos ("Models are Sought") is a 1954 Mexican comedy film film directed by Chano Urueta and starring Sara Montiel, Chula Prieto and Domingo Soler. It was one of the last films Montiel made in Mexico before being called by Hollywood; after a brief spell in the United States, she would focus her film career on her native Spain.

== Plot ==
A clothing store is about to go bankrupt because of its conservative way of modeling the dresses, so they hire new models.

== Cast ==
- Sara Montiel - Rosina
- Raúl Martínez - Raúl
- Chula Prieto - Reyna
- Domingo Soler - Don Lázaro
- Antonio Espino «Clavillazo» - Facundo
- Amparo Arozamena - Laura
- Maruja Grifell - Dueña escuela modelos
- Eufrosina García - Señora Silvanito
- Carlota Solares - Doña Luisa
- Beatriz Saavedra - Amiga de Reyna
- León Barroso

== Reception ==
R. Hernandez-Rodriguez in Splendors of Latin Cinema listed the film among films of the era that were "more entertaining, but definitely less preocupied with contemporary issues" that their contemporaries.
