= Adriana Lavat =

Mexican actress and television host

- Born: Adriana Lavat Rodríguez; September 7, 1974 (age 52); Mexico City, Mexico
- Occupations: Actress, television host
- Years active: 1990s–present
- Notable work: A Que No Te Atreves (1999)
- Spouse: Rafael Márquez (m. 2003; div. 2007)
- Children: 2
- Parent(s): Jorge Lavat (father) (Note: Mexican actor); Chuti Rodríguez (mother)

Adriana Lavat Rodríguez (born September 7, 1974) is a Mexican actress and television host.

Lavat is the daughter of Mexican actor Jorge Lavat. Her mother, Chuti Rodríguez, is also an actress.

She plays small roles in Mexican telenovelas. In 1999, she hosted a television show called "A Que No Te Atreves" next to Sofía Vergara.

Lavat married Mexican soccer player Rafael Márquez in December 2003, and had two children, Santiago and Rafaella, before separating in early 2007 due to rumors of the soccer player having an affair with Mexican model Jaydy Michel, whom he married in 2011. According to Lavat, the only communication she currently has with Márquez concerns their children.
