= Mi amor frente al pasado (1979 TV series) =

- Genre: Telenovela
- Created by: Francis Lai
- Directed by: Carlos S. Zuñiga
- Starring: Blanca Sánchez; Arturo Beristain
- Opening theme: "Un hombre una mujer" by Francis
- Country of origin: Mexico
- Original language: Spanish
- No. of episodes: 20

Original release
- Network: Canal de las Estrellas
- Release: 1979

Mi amor frente al pasado is a Mexican telenovela directed by Carlos S. Zuñiga for Televisa in 1979.

== Cast ==
- Blanca Sánchez
- Arturo Beristáin
- Martha Navarro
- Roberto Cañedo
- Rita Macedo
- Lili Inclán
- Alma Delfina
