= Alejandro Galindo (director) =

- Born: 14 January 1906; Monterrey, Nuevo Leon, Mexico
- Died: 1 February 1999 (aged 93); Mexico City, Mexico
- Other name: Hector Alejandro Galindo Amezcua
- Occupations: Director; Screenwriter
- Years active: 1935–1999 (film)

Héctor Alejandro Galindo Amezcua (January 14, 1906 – February 1, 1999), better known as Alejandro Galindo, was a Mexican screenwriter and film director.

== Selected filmography ==
=== Director ===
- While Mexico Sleeps (1938)
- The 9.15 Express (1941)
- Neither Blood Nor Sand (1941)
- Red Konga (1943)
- Beau Ideal (1948)
- A Family Like Many Others (1949)
- Confessions of a Taxi Driver (1949)
- Doña Perfecta (1951)
- They Say I'm a Communist (1951)
- Los dineros del diablo (1953)
- The Last Round (1953)
- Golden Legs (1958)
- The Life of Agustín Lara (1959)

=== Screenwriter ===
- Land of Passions (1943)

== Bibliography ==
- Spicer, Andrew. Historical Dictionary of Film Noir. Scarecrow Press, 2010.
