= Lupe Carriles =

Mexican character actress

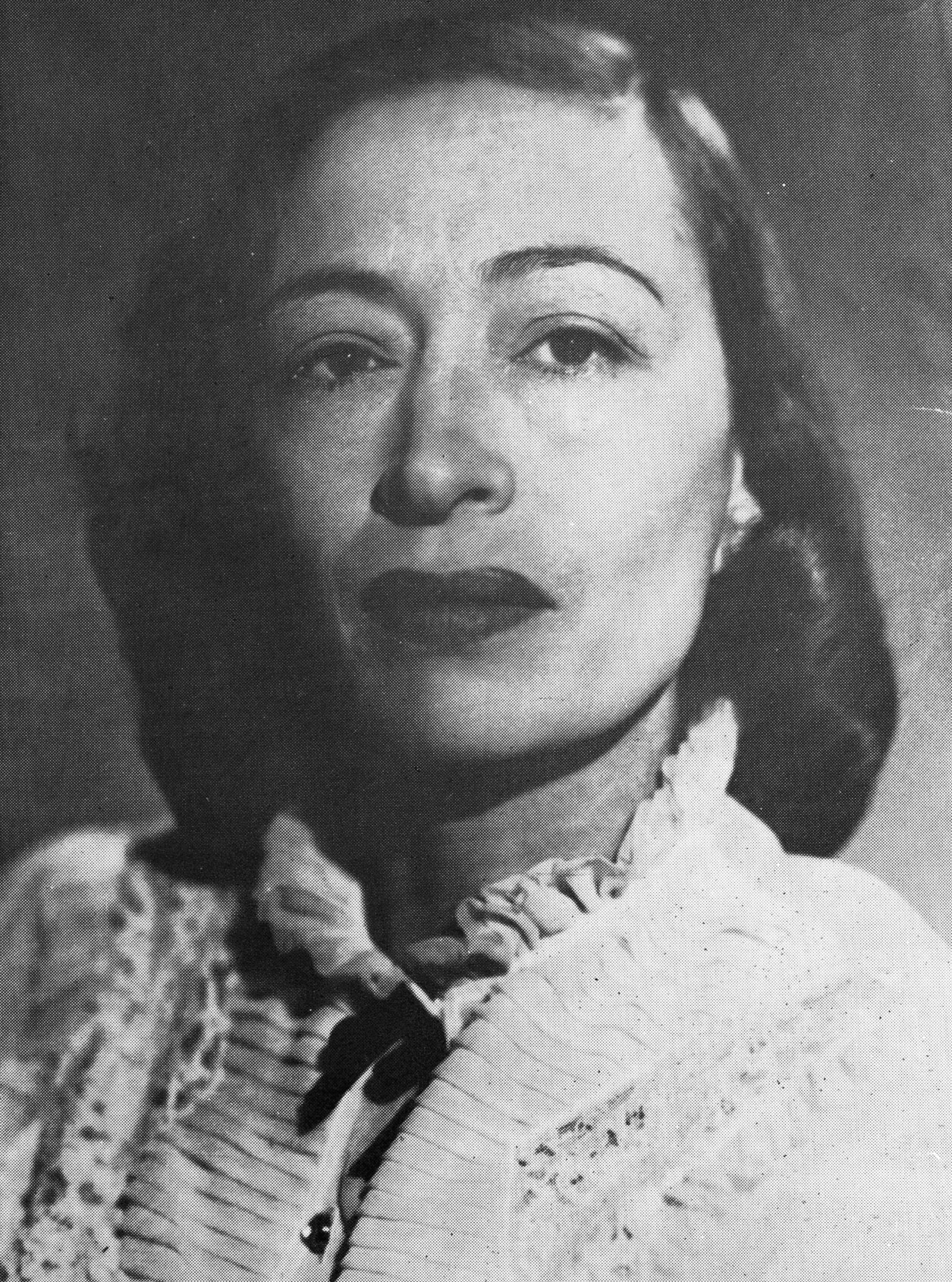
- Carriles in 1954
- Born: María Guadalupe Carriles; 25 December 1913; Guadalajara, Jalisco, Mexico
- Died: 6 February 1964 (aged 50); Mexico City, Mexico
- Occupation: Actress

María Guadalupe Carriles, known as Lupe Carriles (25 December 1913 – 6 February 1964), was a Mexican character actress.

== Career ==
One of her many memorable roles is as "La Trompeta" in La cucaracha (1959), starring María Félix. Although she acted in more than 159 films, she often portrayed servants.

== Selected filmography ==
- The Woman of the Port (1949)
- A Galician in Mexico (1949)
- The Doorman (1950)
- It's a Sin to Be Poor (1950)
- Duel in the Mountains (1950)
- Between Your Love and Heaven (1950)
- The Two Orphans (1950)
- Veracruz Passion (1950)
- Orange Blossom for Your Wedding (1950)
- She and I (1951)
- My Husband (1951)
- Get Your Sandwiches Here (1951)
- Women's Prison (1951)
- They Say I'm a Communist (1951)
- Girls in Uniform (1951)
- Beauty Salon (1951)
- Good Night, My Love (1951)
- Paco the Elegant (1952)
- The Justice of the Wolf (1952)
- Sister Alegría (1952)
- My Wife and the Other One (1952)
- The Unknown Mariachi (1953)
- Made for Each Other (1953)
- El Bruto (1953)
- The Naked Woman (1953)
- Your Memory and Me (1953)
- The Spot of the Family (1953)
- A Tailored Gentleman (1954)
- The Seven Girls (1955)
- The Beast of Hollow Mountain (1956)
- Puss Without Boots (1957)
- Se los chupó la bruja (1958)
- The Soldiers of Pancho Villa (1959)
- Young People (1961)
- El tejedor de milagros (1962)
- The Bloody Vampire (1962)
- El rey del tomate (1963)
