= Gunther Gerzso =

Hungarian-Mexican artist

- Born: Gunther Gerzso; June 17, 1915; Mexico City, Mexico
- Died: April 21, 2000 (aged 84); Mexico City, Mexico
- Education: Cleveland Play House
- Known for: Painting, production design, screenwriting, theatre
- Movement: Surrealism (early works); Abstract art
- Awards: Guggenheim Fellowship (1973); Premio Nacional de Bellas Artes (1978); 5 × Ariel Award for Production Design

Gunther Gerzso (June 17, 1915 – April 21, 2000) was a Mexican painter, designer and director and screenwriter for film and theatre.

== Biography ==
Gerzso was born in Mexico City, in the times of the Revolution. His parents were Oscar Gerzso (Hungarian: Gerzsó Oszkár), a Hungarian immigrant, and Dore Wendland, German by birth. After his father's death a few months after Gunther was born, his mother married a German jeweler. The economic crisis during the revolution caused the family to flee to Europe in 1922. The family returned to Mexico two years later and her mother divorced. Not being able to provide for the children, she sent Gunther to Lugano, Switzerland to live with his uncle Dr. Hans Wendland, who was an influential name in the art world. Gunther, then a teenager, met Paul Klee and lived among his uncle's collection of paintings which included works by Pierre Bonnard, Rembrandt, Paul Cézanne, Eugène Delacroix and Titian. During his time in Lugano, he also met Nando Tamberlani, noted set designer who would introduce him to the world of theater.

In 1931, due to the impact of the Great Depression in Europe, Dr. Wendland sent the boy back to his mother in Mexico City. Back home he started doing sketches for set designs and writing plays influenced by Mr. Tamberlani. Two years later he started working in a local theater production company run by Fernando Wagner. In 1935 he was offered a scholarship to study at the Cleveland Play House where he made more than 50 set designs over the course of four years. During the 1940s and '50s he made various set designs for Mexican, French and American films. He won a total of five Premios Ariel (The Mexican Equivalent of the Oscars) for Best Production Design as well as two more honorary Ariel Awards in 1994 and 2000. During this time he collaborated with directors like Emilio "El Indio" Fernández in Un Día de Vida (1950), Luis Buñuel in Susana (1951), Una Mujer sin Amor (1952) and El rio y la muerte (1955), Yves Allégret in Les Orgueilleux (1953), and John Huston in Under the Volcano (1984).

In the late 1930s Gerzso also started painting as a hobby. The steady parade of beautiful actresses and interesting people he met in show business provided him with a great inspiration for his canvases which showed a mix of European and Mexican influences. His friend, Bernard Pfriem, convinced him to enter the annual Art Exhibition at the Cleveland Museum of Art where two of his works were selected. It was then that Gunther Gerzso started considering himself a painter more than a set designer. In 1941 Gerzso and his wife moved permanently to Mexico City and in 1944 he joined a group of surrealist painters that had taken refuge from the Second World War in Mexico. These artists were Benjamin Péret, Leonora Carrington, Remedios Varo, Alice Rahon and Wolfgang Paalen. His works from this period show a clear surrealist influence, which he later abandoned when he started working his famous abstracts.

According to Octavio Paz, Gunther Gerzso was one of the greatest Latin American painters, since it was he, along with Carlos Mérida and Rufino Tamayo, who opposed the ideologist aesthetic movement into which muralism had degenerated.

Gunther Gerzso was awarded the Guggenheim Fellowship in 1973 and later in 1978 he was the recipient of the Premio Nacional de Bellas Artes. Gunther Gerzso died on April 21, 2000.

== Selected filmography ==
- Santa (1943)
- The Newlywed Wants a House (1948)
- The Shadow of the Bridge (1948)
- Beau Ideal (1948)
- A Family Like Many Others (1949)
- Confessions of a Taxi Driver (1949)
- The Magician (1949)
- Rosauro Castro (1950)
- Between Your Love and Heaven (1950)
- They Say I'm a Communist (1951)
- She and I (1951)
- The Atomic Fireman (1952)
- Sister Alegría (1952)
- The Photographer (1953)
- The Price of Living (1954)
- The River and Death (1955)
- To the Four Winds (1955)
- The King of Mexico (1956)
- El ataúd del Vampiro (1958)
- Sonatas (1959)
