= List of Mexican films of 1954 =

A list of the films produced in Mexico in 1954 (see 1954 in film):

== 1954 ==
| Title | Director | Cast | Genre | Notes |
|---|---|---|---|---|
1954
| Abismos de pasión | Luis Buñuel | Irasema Dilián, Arturo de Córdova, Lilia Prado | | Mexican version of Wuthering Heights |
| Aventuras de Robinson Crusoe | Luis Buñuel | Daniel O'Herlihy, Jaime Fernández | Adventure | |
| Black Ace | Fernando Méndez | Antonio Badú, Meche Barba, René Cardona | Crime drama | |
| Camelia | Roberto Gavaldón | María Félix, Jorge Mistral, Ramón Gay | Drama | |
| Cuidado con el amor | Miguel Zacarías | Pedro Infante, Elsa Aguirre | | |
| Un extraño en la escalera | Tulio Demicheli | Silvia Pinal, Arturo de Córdova | | |
| If You Came Back to Me | Alfredo B. Crevenna | Libertad Lamarque, Silvia Pinal, Miguel Torruco | Drama | |
| La ilusión viaja en tranvía | Luis Buñuel | Lilia Prado, Carlos Navarro, Fernando Soto "Mantequilla" | | |
| Maldita Ciudad | Ismael Rodríguez | Fernando Soler, Anita Blanch | | |
| El mil amores | Rogelio A. González | Pedro Infante, Rosita Quintana, Joaquín Pardavé | | |
| Mulata | Gilberto Martínez Solares | Ninón Sevilla, Pedro Armendáriz | | |
| The Price of Living | Tito Davison | Arturo de Córdova, Rosita Quintana, María Douglas | Drama | |
| El rapto | Emilio Fernández | María Félix, Jorge Negrete | | |
| La rebelión de los Colgados | Alfredo B. Crevenna | Pedro Armendáriz, Ariadne Welter | | |
| Sandra, La Mujer de Fuego | Juan Orol | Rosa Carmina, Juan Orol | | |
| El sindicato del crimen | Juan Orol | Rosa Carmina, Juan Orol | | |
| Untouched | Roberto Gavaldón | Ricardo Montalbán, Ariadna Welter, Víctor Parra | Adventure thriller | |
| El Vizconde de Montecristo | Gilberto Martínez Solares | Tin Tan, Ana Bertha Lepe, Andrés Soler | | |
| A Tailored Gentleman | Miguel M. Delgado | Cantinflas, Martha Valdés, Ángel Garasa | | |
| Borrasca en las almas | Ismael Rodríguez | Carlos Orellana, María Elena Marqués, Roberto Cañedo, Gustavo Rojo | | |
| El casto Susano | Joaquín Pardavé | Joaquín Pardavé, Silvia Pinal, Fernando Fernández | | |
| El hombre inquieto | Rafael Baledón | Germán Valdés, Martha Valdés, Sara García | | |
| La Bruja | Chano Urueta | Lilia del Valle, Ramón Gay, Julio Villarreal | | |
| La Calle de los amores | Raphael J. Sevilla | Armando Calvo, Esther Fernández, Elda Peralta | | |
| La intrusa | Miguel Morayta | Rosario Granados, Eduardo Fajardo, Evangelina Elizondo | | |
| La visita que no tocó el timbre | Julián Soler | Miroslava, Abel Salazar, Manuel Fábregas | | |
| Los Fernández de Peralvillo | Alejandro Galindo | Víctor Parra, David Silva, Sara García | | |
| Romance de fieras | Ismael Rodríguez | Armando Calvo, Martha Roth, Joaquín Cordero | | |
| Se solicitan modelos | Chano Urueta | Sara Montiel, Chula Prieto, Domingo Soler | | |
| Sitting Bull | Sidney Salkow | Dale Robertson, Mary Murphy, J. Carrol Naish | | |
| Take Me in Your Arms | Julio Bracho | Ninón Sevilla, Armando Silvestre | | |
| Tehuantepec | Miguel Contreras Torres | Katy Jurado, Gustavo Rojo, Enrique Rambal | | |
| The River and Death | Luis Buñuel | Columba Domínguez, Miguel Torruco, Joaquín Cordero, Víctor Alcocer ,Jaime Fernández | | |
| The Three Elenas | Emilio Gómez Muriel | Amelia Bence, Manolo Fábregas, Domingo Soler | | |
| La rosa blanca | Emilio Fernández | Rebeca Iturbide, Roberto Cañedo | | |
| Tres citas con el destino | Fernando de Fuentes | Manuel Arbó | | |
| When I Leave | Tito Davison | Libertad Lamarque, Miguel Torruco, Prudencia Grifell | | |

== See also ==
- 1954 in Mexico
