= Caminito de Gloria =

- Original poster
- Directed by: Luis César Amadori
- Written by: Luis César Amadori
- Produced by: Luis César Amadori
- Starring: Libertad Lamarque
- Cinematography: John Alton; José María Beltrán
- Edited by: Nicolás Proserpio
- Music by: Juan de Dios Filiberto; Alfredo Malerba; Mario Maurano
- Distributed by: Argentina Sono Film
- Release date: 20 September 1939 (Argentina)
- Running time: 97 minutes
- Country: Argentina
- Language: Spanish

Caminito de Gloria is a 1939 Argentine musical melodrama film written and directed by Luis César Amadori during the Golden Age of Argentine cinema. The film stars Libertad Lamarque, who sings "Caminito", the celebrated 1926 tango composed by Juan de Dios Filiberto with lyrics by Coria Peñaloza originally popularized by Carlos Gardel and Ignacio Corsini. In 1960 Amadori remade this film under the title Mi último tango (English "My Last Tango "), starring Sara Montiel in the role previously played by Lamarque.

== Cast ==
- Roberto Airaldi
- Emperatriz Carvajal
- Miguel Gómez Bao
- Libertad Lamarque
- Percival Murray
- José Antonio Paonessa
- Semillita
- Rodolfo Zenner
