= Gabino Coria Peñaloza =

Argentine poet and lyricist

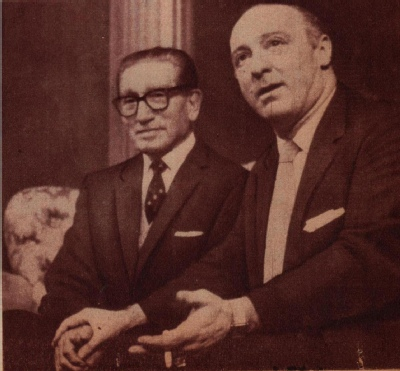
- Gabino Coria Peñaloza (left) and interviewer Jorge Julio Nelson
- Born: February 19, 1881; La Paz, Mendoza
- Died: October 31, 1975 (aged 94); Chilecito

Gabino Coria Peñaloza (February 19, 1881 – October 31, 1975) was an Argentine poet and lyricist.

Gabino Coria Peñaloza was born in La Paz, Mendoza, in 1881. His family relocated to Buenos Aires, and Coria eventually settled into a post as a tax collector for the city. His artistic inclinations stoked an interest in literature, poetry and narration - particularly a form of narration known in the Argentine countryside as coplas, ten-line verses rich in metaphor and aphorisms.

His knowledge of the mountainous La Rioja Province by way of his mother helped secure him a post as vineyards inspector. His friendships with a number of rising figures in Argentine tango, especially composer Juan de Dios Filiberto and vocalist Carlos Gardel, later prompted him to write his first tango, El Pañuelito ("The Handkerchief") in 1920. Made into music by Filiberto, this began one of the genre's best-known collaborations over the years.

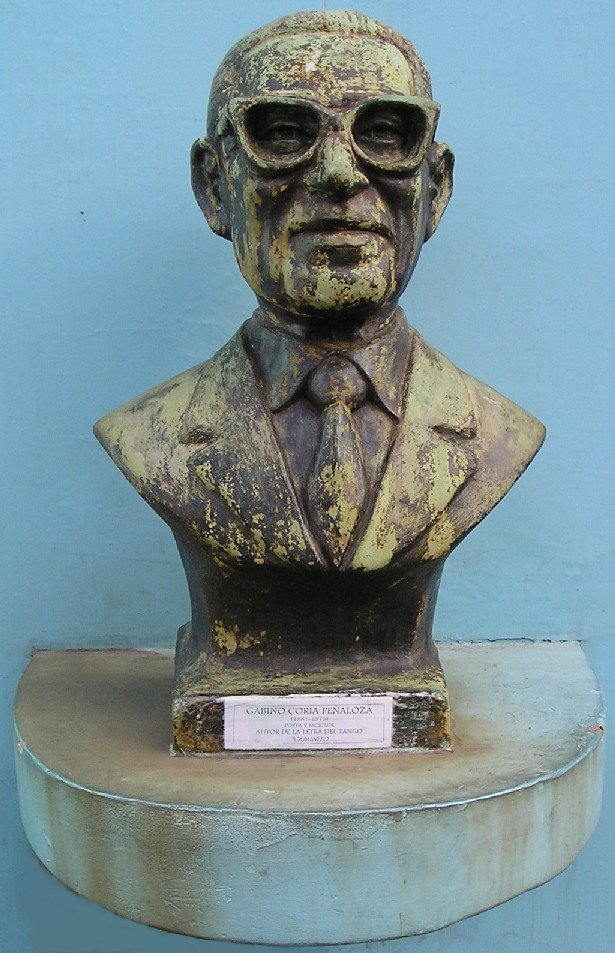
Bust of Gabino Coria Peñaloza, made by Euzer Díaz and placed along Buenos Aires' Caminito.

He named and created lyrics for a number of tangos, including El besito ("Little Kiss"), La cartita ("The Letter"), La Vuelta de Rocha ("Rocha's Bend", a corner in La Boca) and El ramito ("The Bouquet"), among others. His most celebrated creation, however, became a reminiscence of his days in La Rioja, and of a torrid love affair with a pretty young pianist who was forced to leave him after she became pregnant: Caminito - the "Little Path."

Coria Peñaloza later wrote two tangos with Juan Carlos Moreno González: Margaritas ("Daisies"), recorded by Carlos Gardel in 1929 and Mi casita ("My Little House"), with no recordings. Following this disappointment, he relocated to Chilecito, a valley town situated high in the Andes mountains in La Rioja Province. There, he published three books of poetry in subsequent years: El Profeta Indio ("The Indian Prophet"), Cantares ("Ballads"), and La canción de mis canciones ("Song of My Songs").

Caminito, for its part, helped inspire Benito Quinquela Martín's restoration of a derelict La Boca shortcut by the same name during the mid-1950s. The restored, pedestrian street's designation by that name by Mayor Hernán Giralt in 1959 was not attended by Coria, however, who disapproved on the grounds that his lyrics referred to the La Rioja Province road, instead.

He remained in Chilecito with his wife, though unable to locate the son or daughter he was told to have fathered from his youthful fling. Gabino Coria Peñaloza died in Chilecito in 1975, at age 94.
