= The Lady of the Veil =

1949 Mexican drama film

- Directed by: Alfredo B. Crevenna
- Screenplay by: Edmundo Báez (adaptation); Egon Eis (adaptation)
- Based on: a play by Egon Eis
- Produced by: Rodolfo Lowenthal
- Starring: Libertad Lamarque; Armando Calvo; Ernesto Alonso
- Cinematography: Jack Draper
- Edited by: Rafael Portillo
- Music by: Raúl Lavista
- Production company: Fama Films
- Distributed by: Azteca Films Inc.
- Release date: 1 July 1949 (Mexico)
- Running time: 104 minutes
- Country: Mexico
- Language: Spanish

The Lady of the Veil (Spanish: La dama del velo) is a 1949 Mexican drama film directed by Alfredo B. Crevenna and starring Libertad Lamarque, Armando Calvo and Ernesto Alonso. The film's sets were designed by the art director Jesús Bracho.

The film is the first of five productions that Lamarque made with Crevenna, followed by Otra primavera (1950), Huellas del pasado (1950), La mujer sin lágrimas (1951), and Si volvieras a mi (1954).

== Plot ==
Andrea del Monte (Libertad Lamarque) is a singer who falls in love with Esteban Navarro (Armando Calvo), a failed actor who is also alcoholic and married. In a fit of rage, Esteban ends up killing his wife. Unable to relinquish her feelings for him, Andrea decides to go to prison to visit Esteban, but aware of the risk of ruining her reputation in such an act, she uses a veil to hide her identity. Esteban's defense attorney, Cristóbal (Ernesto Alonso), desires to find out who that mysterious lady is.

== Cast ==
- Libertad Lamarque as Andrea del Monte
- Armando Calvo as Esteban Navarro
- Ernesto Alonso as Lic. Cristobal Gómez Peña
- José Baviera as Prosecutor
- Bárbara Gil as Lolita - Laura Camarena
- Tana Lynn as Teresa
- Juan Pulido as School Principal
- Miguel Córcega as Víctor Gómez Peña
- María Gentil Arcos as Andrea's assistant
- Armando Velasco as Police detective
- José María Pedroza
- Héctor López Portillo as Waiter
- Ignacio Peón as Judge
- Joaquín Roche as Prison guard
- Héctor Mateos as Waiter
- Carmen Cabrera as Minister's wife (uncredited)
- Enrique Carrillo as Police officer (uncredited)
- Julio Daneri as Minister (uncredited)
- Irma Dorantes as Party guest (uncredited)
- Pedro Elviro as Man in court (uncredited)
- José Escanero as Juvenile court judge (uncredited)
- Leonor Gómez as Woman in court (uncredited)
- Ana María Hernández as Party guest (uncredited)
- Ismael Larumbe (uncredited)
- Margarito Luna as Member of the jury (uncredited)
- Consuelo Monteagudo as Party guest (uncredited)
- Salvador Quiroz as Impresario (uncredited)
- Hernán Vera (uncredited)

== Production ==
Filming of the movie took place at Estudios Churubusco. Lamarque recorded the music and songs for the film after recovering from a throat condition.
