= My Last Tango =

- Directed by: Luis César Amadori
- Written by: Luis César Amadori; Jesús María de Arozamena
- Produced by: Cesáreo González; Benito Perojo
- Starring: Sara Montiel; Maurice Ronet; Isabel Garcés
- Cinematography: Antonio L. Ballesteros
- Edited by: Antonio Ramírez de Loaysa
- Production companies: Producciones Benito Perojo; Suevia Films
- Distributed by: Suevia Films
- Release date: 29 August 1960
- Running time: 122 minutes
- Country: Spain
- Language: Spanish

My Last Tango (Spanish: Mi último tango) is a 1960 Spanish drama film directed by Luis César Amadori and starring Sara Montiel, Maurice Ronet and Isabel Garcés. A former maid enjoys success as a tango performer in Argentina.

Amadori had previously made this film in 1939 as the musical melodrama Caminito de Gloria, starring Libertad Lamarque.

== Cast ==
- Sara Montiel as Marta Andreu
- Maurice Ronet as Dario Ledesma
- Isabel Garcés as Clarisa
- Laura Granados as Luisa Marival
- Milo Quesada as Carlos Gardel
- Luisa de Córdoba as Adelina
- Alfonso Godá
- Rafael Bardem as Maestro Andreu
- Juan Cortés as Dr, Eladio Ferrer
- María del Puy as Patricia
- Mario Morales as Card Player
- José María Labernié
- Diego Hurtado
- Manuel Guitián as Stage Manager
- Josefina Serratosa as Too Potent Singer
- Rufino Inglés
- Teófilo Palou as Well Travelled Man
- Anotonio Vela as Boy giving bird cage to blind Sarita
- Agustín González as Manager of Teatro Esmeralda

== See also ==
- Caminito de Gloria (1939)

== Bibliography ==
- Bentley, Bernard. A Companion to Spanish Cinema. Boydell & Brewer, 2008.
