= Caminito =

Street located in La Boca, Buenos Aires, Argentina

Coordinates: 34°38′21″S 58°21′46″W

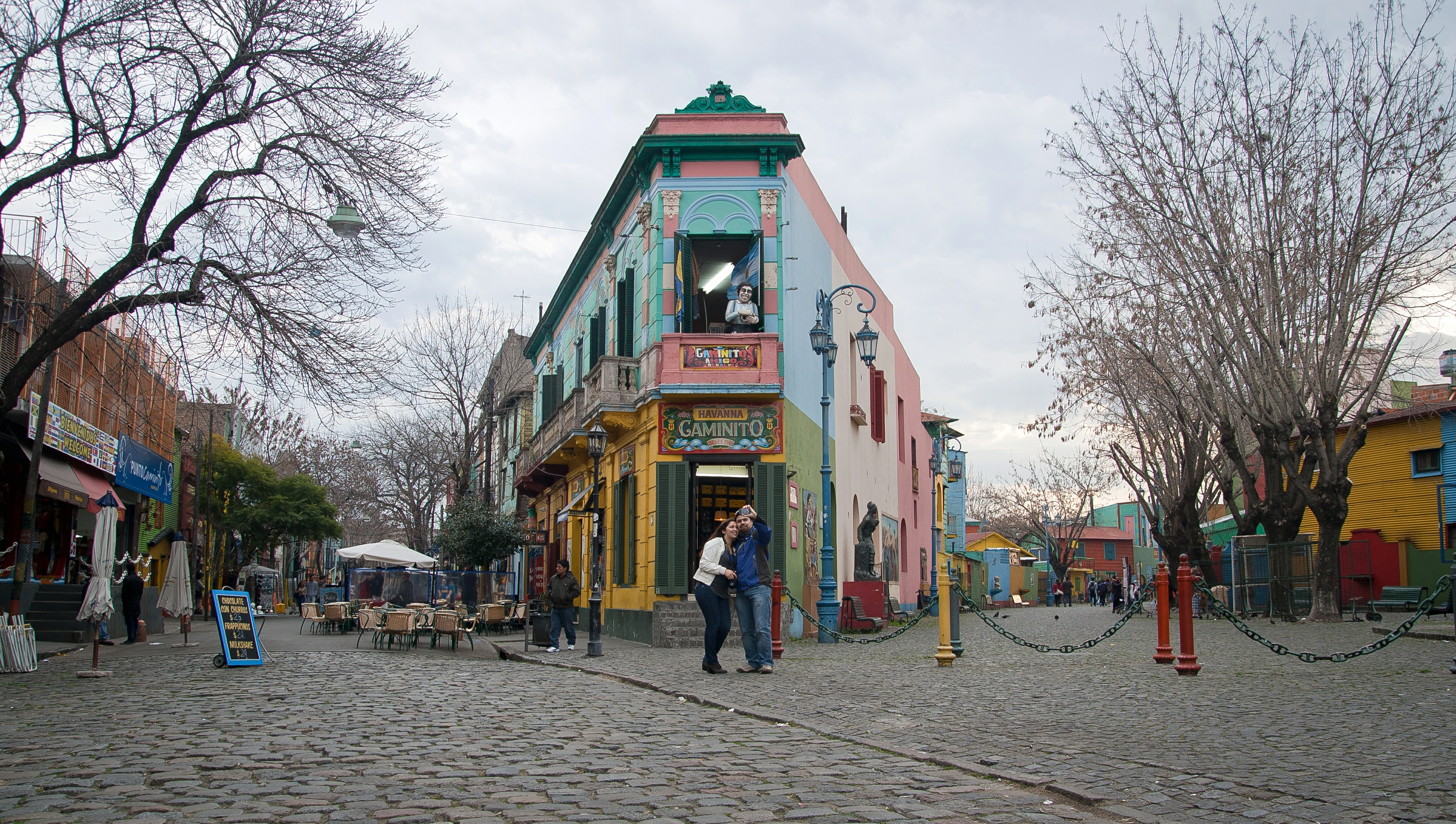
- Typical images of Caminito Location in Buenos Aires
- Interactive map of Caminito
- Length: 100 m (330 ft)
- Northwest end: Gral. G. Araoz De Lamadrid and Garibaldi
- Southeast end: Magallanes and Dr. Del Valle Iberlucea

Caminito ("little walkway" or "little path" in Spanish) is a street museum and a traditional alley, located in La Boca, a neighborhood of Buenos Aires, Argentina. The place acquired cultural significance because it inspired the music for the famous tango "Caminito (1926)", composed by Juan de Dios Filiberto.

Nearby is the Vuelta de Rocha, historic place of Buenos Aires City.

== History ==
During the 1800s, a small stream flowing into the Riachuelo River ran along the same route where the Caminito is now. Later that century, this area of the stream became known as the Puntin, the Genoese diminutive term for bridge (a small bridge allowed people to cross the stream there). When the stream dried up, tracks for the Ferrocarril Buenos Aires y Puerto de la Ensenada were installed at the site. Disused tracks remain at the end of Caminito, along Garibaldi Street.

In 1954, the railroad closed, and the area where Caminito was became a landfill and the neighborhood's eyesore. Over the following three years, Argentine artist Benito Quinquela Martín who lived nearby, painstakingly prepared the walls facing the abandoned street, applying pastel colors, and by 1960 had a stage put up at the southern end; the wooden-plank stage was replaced with a nearby theatre house in 1972. The artist was a personal friend of Argentine tango composer Juan de Dios Filiberto, who created a well-known 1926 tune by the same name.

Caminito
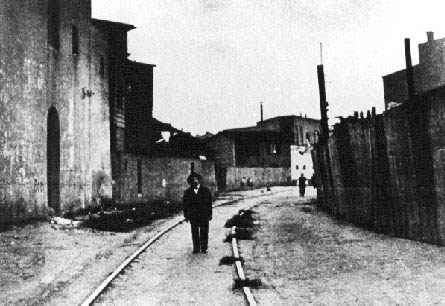
The Caminito in its days as a railway lot, 1939

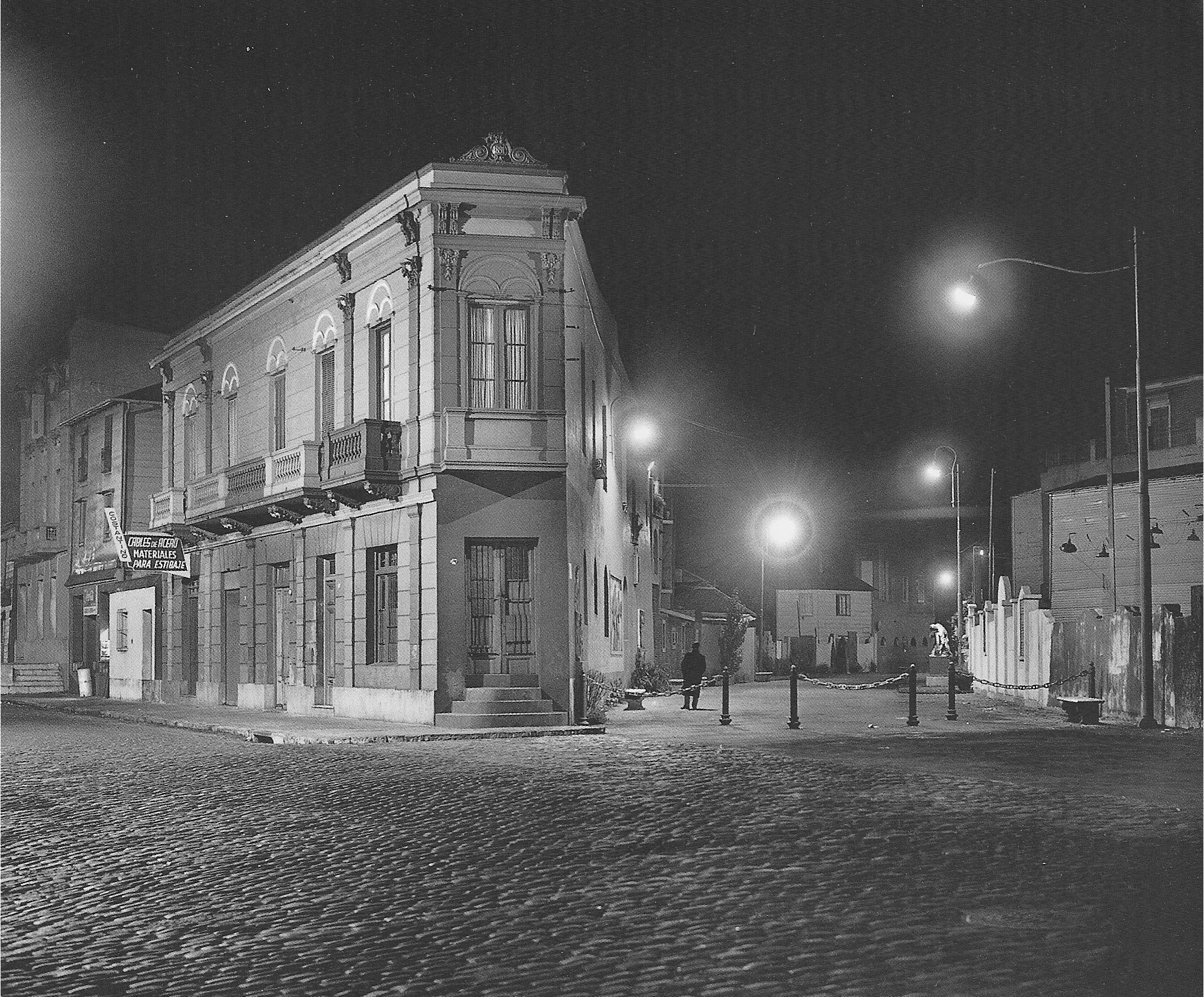
The Caminito in 1960, newly restored

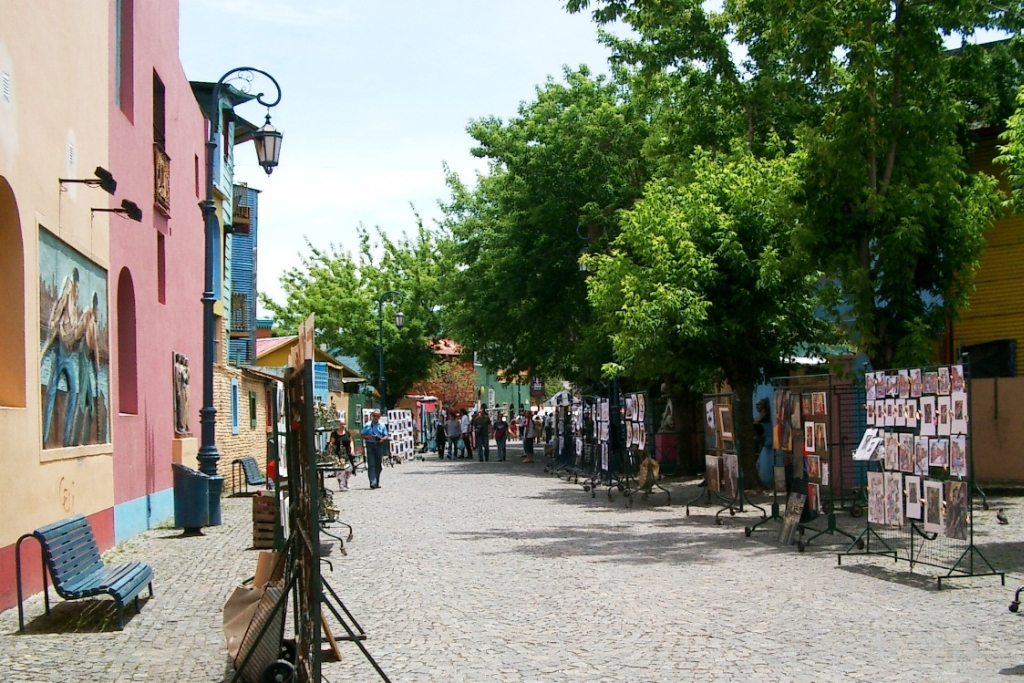
The lyric Caminito, immortalized in song by Juan de Dios Filiberto

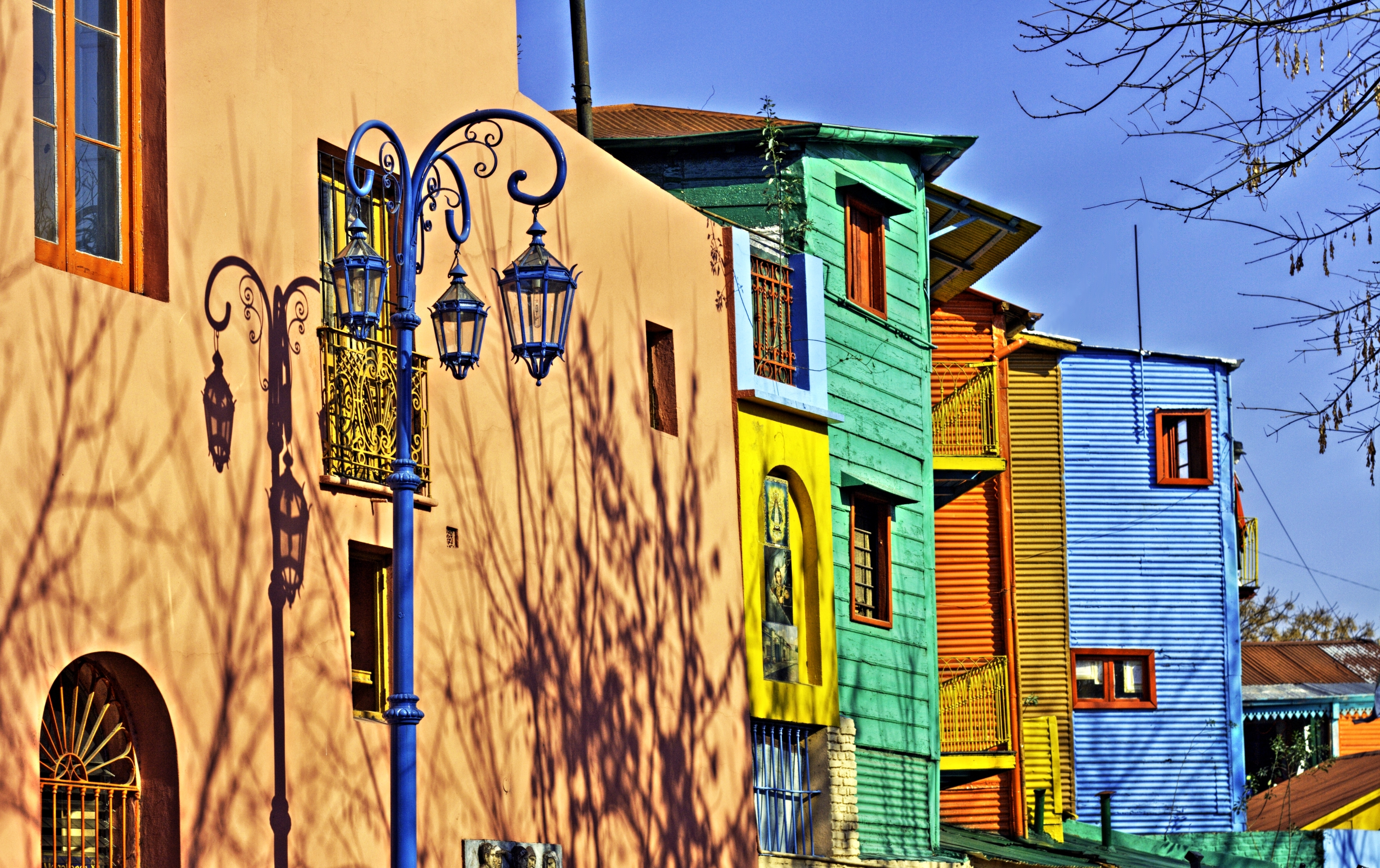
Pastel hues in Caminito

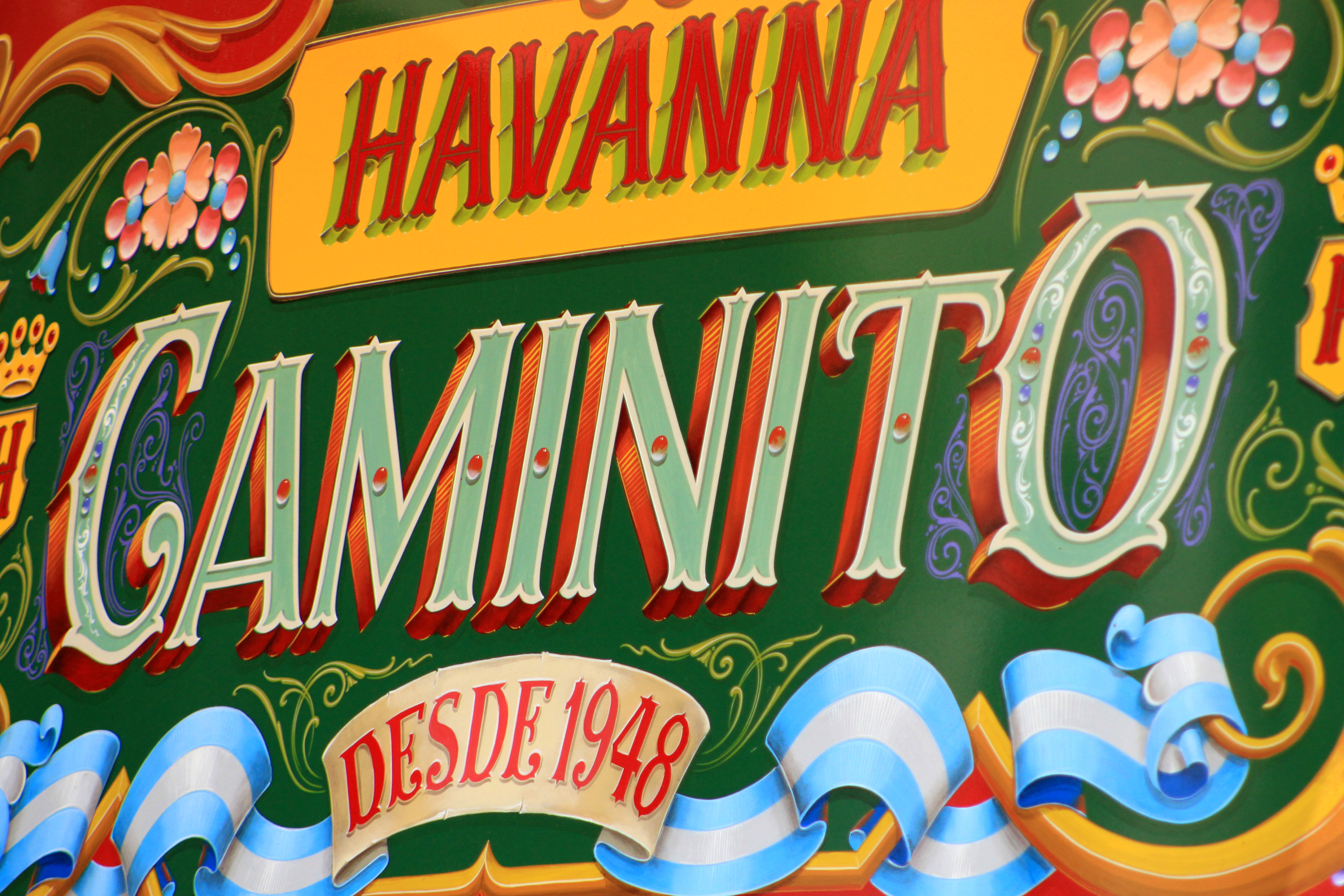
Sign at the Havanna store in Caminito
