= Alfredo Malerba =

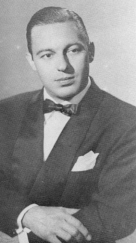
Alfredo Malerba

Alfredo Malerba (24 September 1909 in Rosario – 9 January 1994 in Mexico) was an Argentine pianist, musician, producer, and screenwriter with an illustrious career. He composed several notable tangos, such as Besos brujos, Te lloran mis ojos, Canción de cuna, Cuando el amor muere, Un amor, Cosas del amor and Vendrás alguna vez.

He was married to Libertad Lamarque from 24 December 1945 until his death in 1994.

== Filmography ==
- 1936: Ayúdame a vivir
- 1937: La ley que olvidaron
- 1937: Besos brujos
- 1938: Madreselva
- 1938: Puerta cerrada
- 1939: La vida de Carlos Gardel, donde se lo puede ver en el film.
- 1939: Caminito de gloria
- 1940: Cita en la frontera
- 1941: Una vez en la vida
- 1970: Rosas blancas para mi hermana negra
- 1972: La sonrisa de mamá
- 1978: La mamá de la novia
