= Pellizco =

Argentine chocolate confection

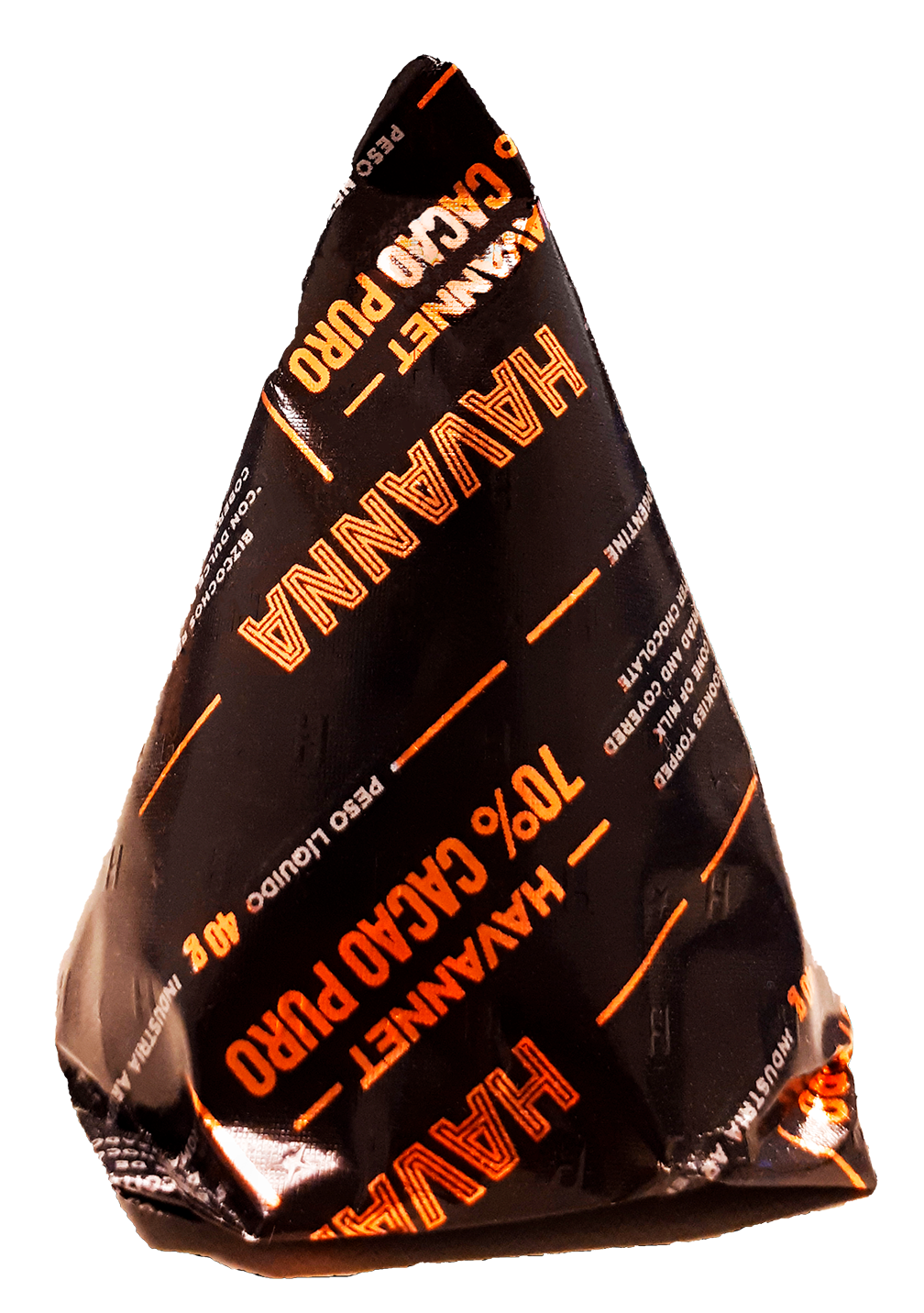
- Havannet, a pellizco marketed by Havanna.
- Alternative names: Conito
- Type: Confectionery
- Place of origin: Argentina
- Region or state: Quequén and Necochea
- Main ingredients: Chocolate, dulce de leche

Pellizco, or conito (Spanish: little cone), is a type of chocolate typical of Argentina, produced mainly in the cities of Quequén and Necochea.

It is a cone approximately two centimeters in diameter at the base and three centimeters high; its interior is filled with dulce de leche and covered with a thin layer of dark chocolate. They achieved national recognition thanks to the Havanna alfajor factory, originally from Mar del Plata, which markets them under the name Havannets.

More elaborate varieties of pellizco include those with dulce de leche mixed with cream or small amounts of distilled alcoholic beverages, or with the addition of pieces of walnut, peanut, almond, hazelnut, cashew, etc.
