= Juan Pulido =

Spanish actor and singer

- Born: 19 June 1891; Las Palmas, Canary Islands, Spain
- Died: 23 November 1972 (aged 81); Mexico City, Mexico
- Occupations: Actor, singer
- Years active: 1930–1955 (film)

Juan Pulido (1891–1972) was a Spanish singer and film actor. Born in the Canary Islands, he lived in New York City, Cuba and other Latin American nations. Settling in Mexico, he regularly appeared in films during the Golden Age of Mexican Cinema. He was married to the actress Dalia Íñiguez.

== Selected filmography ==
- Paramount on Parade (1930)
- The Associate (1946)
- The Tiger of Jalisco (1947)
- Arsène Lupin (1947)
- Five Faces of Woman (1947)
- The Flesh Commands (1948)
- Angelitos negros (1948)
- Zorina (1949)
- The Lady of the Veil (1949)
- Dicen que soy mujeriego (1949)
- Opium (1949)
- Philip of Jesus (1949)
- Another Spring (1950)
- The Cry of the Flesh (1951)
- What Idiots Men Are (1951)
- Good Night, My Love (1951)
- Women Without Tomorrow (1951)
- Kill Me Because I'm Dying! (1951)
- Crime and Punishment (1951)
- Engagement Ring (1951)
- If You Came Back to Me (1954)

== Bibliography ==
- Kanellos, Nicolás. A History of Hispanic Theatre in the United States: Origins to 1940.
- Wade, Peter. Music, Race, and Nation: Musica Tropical in Colombia. University of Chicago Press, 2000.
