= Guillermina Téllez Girón =

Mexican actress (born 1934)

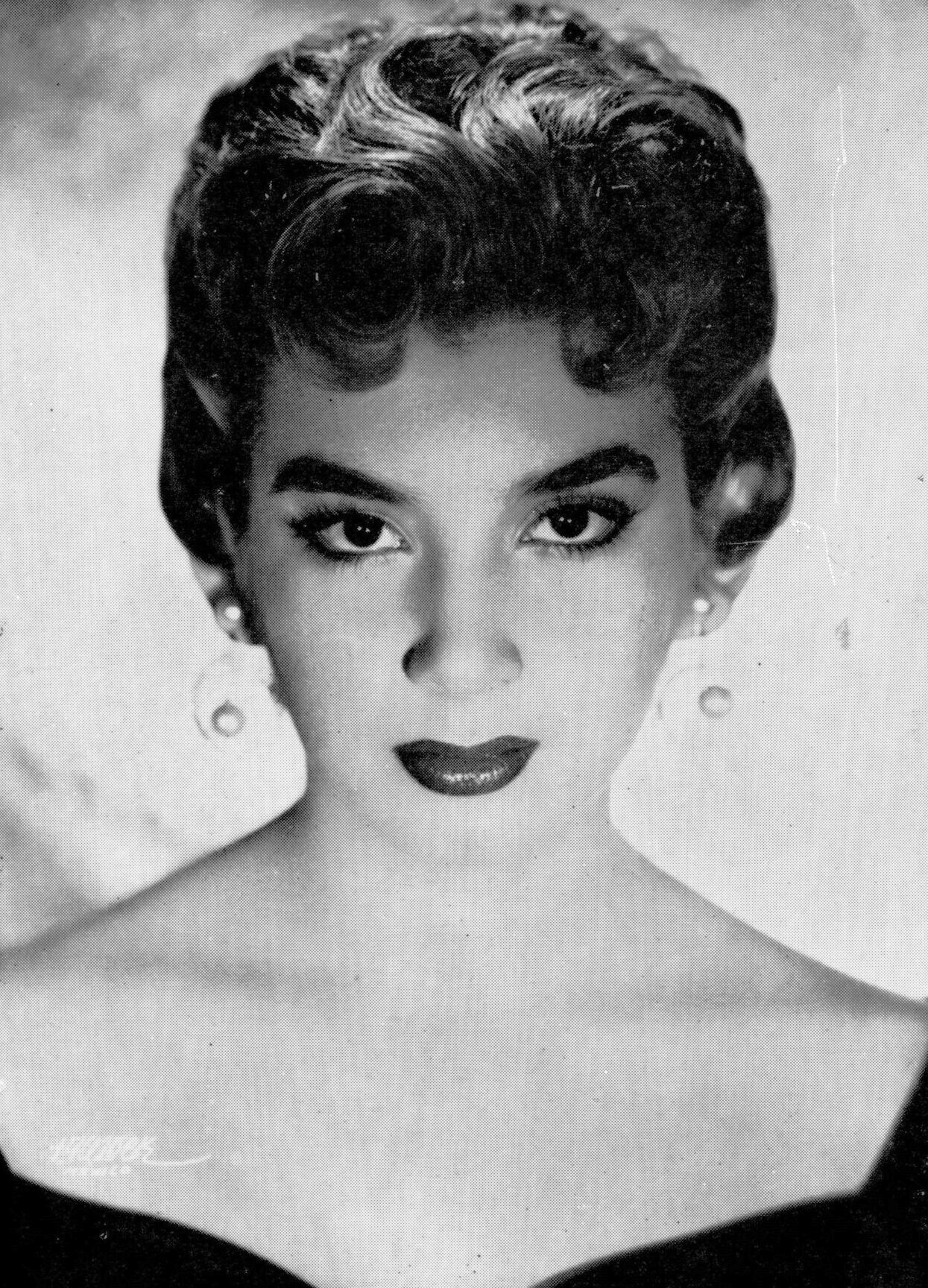
- Téllez Girón in 1954
- Born: Guillermina Téllez Girón Gómez; 6 May 1935 (age 91); Mexico City, Mexico
- Occupation: Actress
- Years active: 1949–1965
- Spouse: Juan Carlos López
- Children: 3

Guillermina Téllez Girón Gómez (born 6 May 1935) is a Mexican actress.

== Career ==
She studied acting at the Andrés Soler Academy, of the National Association of Actors (ANDA). Girón was one of the earliest people to work for Mexican television in 1950, hired as a model for XHTV Channel 4. Active during the Golden Age of Mexican Cinema, she worked as a film actress from 1949 to 1965. She debuted in cinema with the feature La mujer del puerto (1949) and retired with the adventure drama Diablos en el cielo (1965).

In 1950, she was elected "Queen of Sports", gaining attention from actor Germán Valdés, who chose her to work with him in small roles on the films La marca del Zorrillo and Simbad el mareado.

== Personal life ==
She married Juan Carlos López, with whom she had three children. In 1996, one of her children died, a son who was also named Juan Carlos, who took his own life at the age of 38.

== Filmography ==
- La mujer del puerto (1949)
- El diablo no es tan diablo (1949)
- El charro y la dama (1949)
- Lluvia roja (1950)
- Perdida (1950)
- La marca del Zorrillo (1950)
- Azahares para tu boda (1950)
- Médico de guardia (1950)
- La loca de la casa (1950)
- Simbad el mareado (1950)
- Mi querido capitán (1950)
- Especialista en señoras (1951)
- El gran autor (1954)
- Si volvieras a mí (1951)
- La bruja (1954)
- Los aventureros (1954)
- Dos mundos y un amor (1954)
- Tres bribones (1955)
- Yo fui novio de Rosita Alvírez (1955)
- La barranca de la muerte (1955)
- La venganza del Diablo (1955)
- Mi noche de bodas (1955)
- El fantasma de la casa roja (1956)
- Ay, Chaparros... ¡Cómo abundan! (1956)
- Pancho López (1957)
- Bolero inmortal (1958)
- A sablazo limpio (1958)
- Viva la parranda (1960)
- Peligros de juventud (1960)
- El extra (1962)
- El mundo de las drogas (1964)
- Diablos en el cielo (1965)
