= Romance de fieras =

- Directed by: Ismael Rodríguez
- Written by: Asunción Aiza Banduni(novel), Ismael Rodríguez (screenplay)
- Starring: Carlos Orellana, Armando Calvo, Martha Roth, Joaquín Cordero
- Release date: 24 June 1954
- Running time: 92 minutes
- Country: Mexico
- Language: Spanish

Romance de fieras ("Romance of Beasts") is a 1954 Mexican film. It stars Carlos Orellana.

== Cast ==
- Armando Calvo - Ricardo Narváez
- Martha Roth - Gabriela de Alba
- Joaquín Cordero - Lic. Javier Ponce
- Carlos Orellana - Don Carlos Narváez
- Verónica Loyo - Patricia
- Emma Rodríguez - Magda
- María Gentil Arcos - Tía Milagros
- Conchita Gentil Arcos - Tía Remedios
- Guillermo Bravo Sosa - Juan el Capataz
- Agustín de la Lanza - Luisito
- Julio Daneri - Federico de Alba
- Julio Sotelo - Juez
