= The Woman Who Had No Childhood =

- Directed by: Tito Davison
- Written by: Edmundo Báez; Tito Davison; Fernando Galiana; José Luis Galiana
- Produced by: Alberto Hernández Curiel (as A. Hernandez C.); Jesús Sotomayor Martínez
- Starring: Libertad Lamarque; Pedro Armendáriz; Elsa Cárdenas; Freddy Fernández; Andrea Palma
- Cinematography: José Ortiz Ramos
- Edited by: Carlos Savage
- Music by: Sergio Guerrero
- Production company: Producciones Sotomayor
- Release date: 25 July 1957 (Mexico)
- Running time: 92 minutes
- Country: Mexico
- Language: Spanish

The Woman Who Had No Childhood (Spanish: La mujer que no tuvo infancia) is a 1957 Mexican comedy drama film directed by Tito Davison and starring Libertad Lamarque and Pedro Armendáriz.

== Plot ==
When her husband dies, a woman (Libertad Lamarque) inherits his fortune, but enters a deep emotional crisis that makes her act like a child. Her lawyer (Pedro Armendáriz) will be in charge of protecting her interests against those of her late husband's selfish and fortune-seeking relatives while helping her recover from her condition, since he is secretly in love with her.

== Cast ==
- Libertad Lamarque as Rosaura
- Pedro Armendáriz as Lic. Alberto Garza Cifuentes
- Elsa Cárdenas as Luisa
- Freddy Fernández as Alberto hijo
- Andrea Palma as Matilde
- Anita Blanch as Clotilde
- José Baviera as Andrés
- Carlos Martínez Baena as Board Representative
- Ignacio Peón as Nicolás, butler
- Nicolás Rodríguez as José de la Vega, adviser
- Emilio Gaete as Dr. Salazar
- Armando Arriola as Alejandrito
- José Pardavé as Ice Cream Seller
- Rogelio Jiménez Pons as Pepito (as Niño Rogelio Jiménez Pons)
- Magda Donato as La nena Rendón
- Sara Cabrera as Eduviges
- Enrique Díaz Indiano as Doctor
- Armando Velasco as Dr. Andrade
- Daniel Arroyo as Daniel Treviño de Velasco (uncredited)
- León Barroso as Waiter (uncredited)
- Lonka Becker como Gringa in restaurant (uncredited)
- Alfonso Carti como Waiter (uncredited)
- Roy Fletcher como Announcer (uncredited)
- Pepita González como Matilde's Friend (uncredited)
- Leonor Gómez como Cook (uncredited)
- Ana María Hernández como Matilde's Friend (uncredited)
- Bertha Lehar como Juanita, maid (uncredited)
- Elvira Lodi como Woman in restaurant (uncredited)
- Miguel Manzano como Judge (uncredited)
- Concepción Martínez como Carmencita (uncredited)
- Álvaro Matute como Man in restaurant (uncredited)
- Consuelo Monteagudo como Chelito, Matilde's friend (uncredited)
- Carlos Robles Gil como Council Member (uncredited)
- Aurora Ruiz como Crescencia, Alberto's maid (uncredited)
