= Caminito (song) =

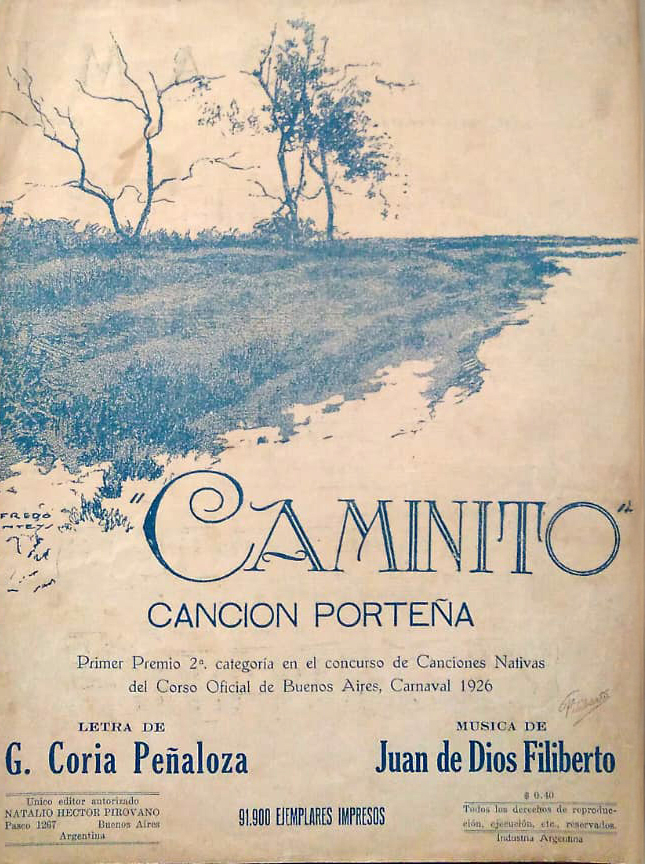

Song by Carlos Gardel
- Language: Spanish
- Recorded: 26 November 1926
- Genre: Tango
- Length: 2:28
- Label: Odeón
- Composer: Juan de Dios Filiberto
- Lyricist: Gabino Coria Peñaloza

"Caminito" is a tango with music composed in 1926 by Juan de Dios Filiberto (music) and lyrics by Gabino Coria Peñaloza (lyrics). It was initially recorded by Carlos Gardel but gained popularity through a performance by Ignacio Corsini.

The lyrics of the song—written before the music—are inspired by the Caminito de Olta, a rural path in the town of Olta, in what is now the General Belgrano Department, in the province of La Rioja. It was part of an old rural path that led from the town to the nearby village of Loma Blanca. The music, on the other hand, is inspired by the Caminito in the La Boca neighborhood of Buenos Aires.

It is considered the third most famous tango in the world, after La cumparsita and El choclo. It has been performed by artists of many different styles and nationalities, with a notable version by The Three Tenors.

== Lyrics ==
Widely known and readily identifiable throughout Argentina and neighboring Uruguay, the lyrics are in themselves a classically structured poem with strophes made up of two verses and one refrain:

Caminito que el tiempo ha borrado, que juntos un día nos viste pasar, he venido por última vez he venido a contarte mi mal. Caminito que entonces estabas bordado de trébol y juncos en flor, una sombra ya pronto serás una sombra lo mismo que yo. refrain: Desde que se fue triste vivo yo, caminito amigo yo también me voy. Desde que se fue nunca más volvió, seguiré sus pasos, caminito, adiós.	Little path the years swept away you saw us together go by I've come to you one last time I've come to tell you and cry. Little path once you were covered covered in clover and rushes in bloom you will soon be only a shadow a shadow as I am too. refrain: Since she went away I live in pain little path, my friend, I'll go away as well - She went away and has never returned I shall trace her footsteps, little path, farewell.

== History ==
Gabino Coria Peñaloza and Juan de Dios Filiberto met in 1920, introduced by the painter Quinquela Martín. They formed a strong creative partnership and together composed a number of successful tangos, such as El pañuelito (1920), La cartita (1921), and La Vuelta de Rocha (1924), among others.

Coria Peñaloza recounted that one afternoon in 1925, in a café on Florida Street in the 300 block, Filiberto hummed a melody he had composed, inspired by a path in his neighborhood, La Boca, and asked Coria Peñaloza to write lyrics for it. At that moment, the poet sketched the melody on a piece of paper but later lost it. Filiberto kept insisting:

“Four months later, I met up with Filiberto again and he asked me once more for the lyrics. I saw how eager he was to finish his tango, so I went to the boarding house and started searching through all the papers—old poems, publications, etc.—and I found a verse: it was Caminito, a love poem.” Gabino Coria Peñaloza

It was a poem written more than twenty years earlier, inspired by the end of a love affair Coria Peñaloza had in his twenties in the town of Olta, in La Rioja, where his mother was from. At the time, the poet had fallen in love with a local music teacher named María, whose full identity he never wanted to reveal. They had a passionate romance, but the young woman's family sent her away to prevent the relationship. Coria Peñaloza then wrote those verses, referring to the Caminito (little path) in Olta where they used to meet. The melody created by Filiberto came from a similar emotional place. The composer himself once said:

“In 1904, I would walk past this bend... I was on my way to work... I worked as a mechanic... Many years later, as a musician, in 1923, I passed by one evening, nostalgic for those times; I remembered a girl who used to appear at a window, and a few bars of the song El caminito came to me, which I didn’t finish until 1926.”

Apparently, Filiberto tried to change the lyrics slightly to better fit the melody, but Coria Peñaloza refused, so Filiberto ended up adjusting the melody to match the poem’s original meter. The piece premiered that same year, 1926, at the Native Songs Contest of the Carnaval de Buenos Aires. It won the contest but didn’t initially impress the public. That same year, Carlos Gardel recorded it for the Odeón label, but the song didn’t yet stand out.

The following year, on May 5, playwright Alberto Novión premiered a sainete (a short comedic play) titled Facha Tosta (from Italian, meaning "shameless"). In that sainete, Ignacio Corsini performed Caminito, and this time, the song achieved resounding success; Gardel, a good friend of Corsini, then handed it over to him.

In the following years, Caminito fell somewhat into obscurity, especially after Corsini’s major success with La pulpera de Santa Lucía. In 1930, the mayor of Buenos Aires, José María Cantilo, organized a major tribute to Filiberto, during which Corsini reintroduced Caminito, solidifying its popularity.
