= If You Came Back to Me =

1954 film

- Directed by: Alfredo B. Crevenna
- Screenplay by: Julio Alejandro de Castro
- Story by: Henry Bordeaux
- Produced by: Gregorio Walerstein
- Starring: Libertad Lamarque; Silvia Pinal; Miguel Torruco; Maricruz Olivier
- Cinematography: Agustín Martínez Solares
- Edited by: Rafael Ceballos
- Music by: Manuel Esperón
- Production company: Filmex
- Release date: 1 October 1954 (Mexico)
- Running time: 100 minutes
- Country: Mexico
- Language: Spanish

If You Came Back to Me (Spanish: Si volvieras a mí) is a 1954 Mexican drama film directed by Alfredo B. Crevenna and starring Libertad Lamarque, Silvia Pinal, Miguel Torruco and Maricruz Olivier. It was shot at the San Ángel Studios in Mexico City. The film's sets were designed by the art director Jorge Fernández.

== Plot ==
Alejandra (Libertad Lamarque) is married to doctor Pedro (Miguel Torruco) and they have a daughter, Eva (Maricruz Olivier). When Eva is a young woman, she travels with her mother to the capital to meet Pedro, where they discover that he has set up a luxury hospital alongside a partner, Lidia (Silvia Pinal). Alejandra realizes that Lidia has stolen her husband's love and is doing the same with her daughter, whom she uses to try to kill her own mother without knowing she is poisoning her with medication.

== Cast ==
- Libertad Lamarque as Alejandra
- Silvia Pinal as Lidia Kane
- Miguel Torruco as Pedro Cuenca
- Maricruz Olivier as Eva
- Arturo Soto Rangel as Alejandra's Father
- Manuel Dondé
- Agata Rosenow
- Eduardo Acuña
- María Herrero
- Guillermina Téllez Girón
- Victorio Blanco (uncredited)
- Fernando Casanova as Fabián Altamirano (uncredited)
- Martha Mijares as Student (uncredited)
- Juan Pulido as Doctor (uncredited)
- Enedina Díaz de León as Old Woman (uncredited)
