= Another Spring =

1950 Mexican drama film

- Directed by: Alfredo B. Crevenna
- Screenplay by: Edmundo Báez (adaptation); Egon Eis (adaptation)
- Based on: Otra primavera by Rodolfo Usigli
- Produced by: Óscar Dancigers
- Starring: Libertad Lamarque; Ernesto Alonso; Patricia Morán
- Cinematography: José Ortiz Ramos
- Edited by: Carlos Savage
- Music by: Manuel Esperón
- Production company: Ultramar Films
- Release date: 27 April 1950 (Mexico)
- Running time: 93 minutes
- Country: Mexico
- Language: Spanish

Another Spring (Spanish: Otra primavera) is a 1950 Mexican drama film directed by Alfredo B. Crevenna and starring Libertad Lamarque and Ernesto Alonso.

The film is one of five productions that Lamarque made with Crevenna, the others being La dama del velo (1949), Huellas del pasado (1950), La mujer sin lágrimas (1951), y Si volvieras a mí (1954).

== Plot ==
Arturo (Ernesto Alonso), after becoming a widower, thinks that at last he will be able to spend his life with Amelia (Libertad Lamarque), his mistress and the woman he always loved, and recognize the children they had together. Amelia, however, fears that people will start talking badly about her and especially that her children will question her. For her part, Arturo's daughter is upset with the arrival of Amelia and her children and promises to make their lives impossible, while doubts about the circumstances of the death of Arturo's previous wife remain.

== Cast ==
- Libertad Lamarque as Amelia
- Ernesto Alonso as Arturo Montesinos
- Patricia Morán as Cristina
- Alberto Galán as Javier
- Alicia Grau as Adult Marta
- Carlos Navarro as Adult Raúl
- Héctor López Portillo as Eugenio
- Carlos Martínez Baena as Amelia's father
- María Gentil Arcos as Faustina, maid
- Paco Martínez as Dionisio, butler (as Francisco Martínez)
- Azucena Rodríguez as Child Marta
- Luis Rodríguez as Child Raúl
- Daniel Arroyo as Party guest (uncredited)
- Ricardo Avendaño as Man in funeral (uncredited)
- Victorio Blanco as Wedding guest (uncredited)
- Jorge Chesterking as Party guest (uncredited)
- Irma Dorantes as Party guest (uncredited)
- Enedina Díaz de León as Maid (uncredited)
- José Luis Fernández as Man among crowd (uncredited)
- Lidia Franco as Doña María del Carmen (uncredited)
- Ana María Hernández as Party guest (uncredited)
- Velia Lupercio as Guest at reception (uncredited)
- Concepción Martínez as Wedding guest (uncredited)
- Álvaro Matute as Police officer (uncredited)
- Rubén Márquez as Party guest (uncredited)
- Ignacio Peón as Feliciano (uncredited)
- Juan Pulido as Council president (uncredited)
- María Valdealde as Party guest (uncredited)
