= Remember to Live (film) =

1953 film

- Directed by: Roberto Gavaldón
- Written by: Edmundo Báez Roberto Gavaldón; Mauricio Magdaleno; Alejandro Verbitzky; Gregorio Walerstein
- Produced by: Gregorio Walerstein
- Starring: Libertad Lamarque; Carmen Montejo; Miguel Torruco
- Cinematography: Agustín Martínez Solares
- Edited by: Rafael Ceballos
- Music by: Manuel Esperón
- Production company: Cinematográfica Filmex
- Release date: 5 February 1953
- Running time: 111 minutes
- Country: Mexico
- Language: Spanish

Remember to Live (Spanish: Acuérdate de vivir) is a 1953 Mexican drama film directed by Roberto Gavaldón and starring Libertad Lamarque, Carmen Montejo and Miguel Torruco.

== Main cast ==
- Libertad Lamarque as Yolanda
- Carmen Montejo as Leonora
- Miguel Torruco as Manuel Iturbide
- Joaquín Cordero as Jorge, adulto
- Elda Peralta as Marta
- Yolanda Varela as Silvia
- Luis Rodríguez as Andrés
- Tito Novaro as José Eduardo Pacheco
- Dolores Camarillo as Margarita
- Juan Orraca Jr. as Andrés, niño
- Nicolás Rodríguez Jr. as Jorge, niño
- Bárbara Gil as Esther
- Tito Junco as Ingeniero Raúl Fuentes

== Bibliography ==
- Darlene J. Sadlier. Latin American Melodrama: Passion, Pathos, and Entertainment. University of Illinois Press, 2009.
