= Havanna (Argentine company) =

Argentine manufacturer of food products

Havanna Holding S.A.

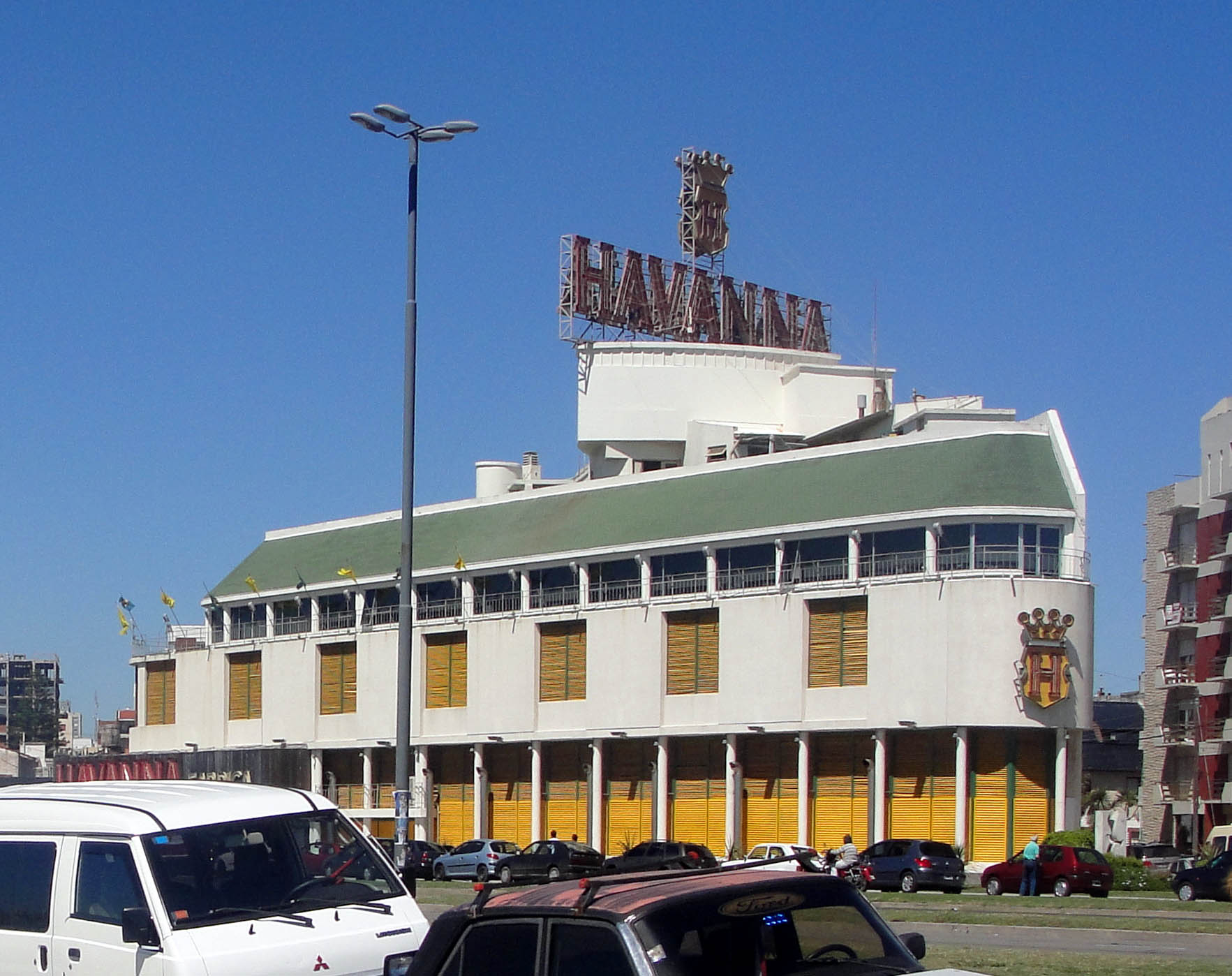
- Havanna headquarters and former factory, photographed in January 2011
- Company type: S.A.
- Traded as: BCBA: HAVA
- Industry: Food
- Founded: 1948; 78 years ago
- Founder: Benjamín Sisterna; Demetrio Elíades; Luis Sbaraglini
- Headquarters: Mar del Plata, Argentina
- Products: Alfajores, cone-shaped alfajores, dulce de leche, cookies, puddings, coffee
- Brands: Havanet
- Revenue: AR$3,140 million (2020)
- Net income: 139,815,118 Argentine convertible peso (2019)
- Total assets: 2,974,690,524 Argentine convertible peso (2019)
- Number of employees: 70–80 (2020)
- Parent: Exxel Group (1998–2003); DyG Group (2003–present)
- Website: havana.com.ar

Havanna Holding S.A. (mostly known for its trade name Havanna) is an Argentine manufacturer of food products, mostly known for its alfajores. The firm was founded in 1948 by Benjamín Sisterna, Demetrio Elíades, and Luis Sbaraglini and began its activities as a producer of alfajores in the city of Mar del Plata.

The company also operates its own system of franchise coffee stores and exports its products to Bolivia, Brazil, Chile, Costa Rica, France, Israel, Mexico, Paraguay, Peru, Spain, the United Kingdom, the United States, Uruguay and Venezuela.

== History ==
=== First years and expansion ===
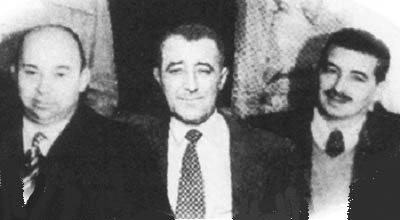
Fltr: Demetrio Elíades, Luis Sbaraglini, Benjamín Sisterna, founders of Havanna

Benjamín Sisterna had worked in several bakeries in his home town, Santa Fe, until he arrived in Buenos Aires at 18, where he worked at traditional "Confitería Los Dos Chinos". Siserna then joined Luis Sbaraglini to manufacture alfajores, creating their own brand, "Santa Mónica", whose products were briefely commercialised in Buenos Aires. In the 1940s, Sisterna went to Mar del Plata, where he soon formed a team with Demetrio Elíades, the owner of "Confitería Havanna", a Cuban-style restaurant situated in downtown Mar del Plata. It was said that the name "Havanna" was an homage to the capital city of Cuba but the reason why the name was written with a double "n" is still unclear. As Elíades was not satisfied with his business, he decided to join Sisterna and Sbaraglini to start a new one focused on the manufacture of alfajores to compete with "Gran Casino", the main company in the city by then. Alfajores Havanna was registered in 1947, operating in the former restaurant which was completely refurbished, turning into a factory. The first products were sold in January 1948.

The products of Confitería Havanna were made to the same formula used today. Following the success of the chocolate-flavoured alfajores, other varieties were added. By the 1950s, Havanna had eight stores in the city. For a long time Havanna's alfajores were chosen by the tourists who spent their vacations at the resort and the Havanna brand became representative of the city and of Argentina as a national product.

During the 1960s, Havanna consolidated its position as the top seller in the city, overpassing direct competitor "Gran Casino" alfajores, which business was purchased by Havanna itself. As Sbaraglini died in 1963 and Elíades in 1966, the company was taken over by their descendants and share holders.

=== Company purchase ===
In 1998 Havanna was sold to local company Exxel Group for about US$85 million. At the time of purchase, Havanna produced 5,5 million dozen alfajores per year in its two industrial plants located in Mar del Plata. The company also had 130 shops in both cities, Buenos Aires and Mar del Plata, employing 300 people (increasing to 600 in summer, when most visitors go to Mar del Plata). Under the ownership of Exxel Group, Havanna started its expansion outside Mar del Plata, opening stores along Argentina.

By 2003 Havanna had increased its debt to more than US$30 million because of the collapse of the economy in Argentina between 1999 and 2002. As a consequence, the Exxel Group sold the company to a group of private investors called "Grupo de Desarrollo y Gestión" (DyG Group), for only US$5 million. In hands of DyG Group, Havanna's became a global company, mainly in Latin America with presence in Brazil, Chile, Perú, Bolivia, Paraguay, Brasil, Ecuador, Venezuela, but also opening points of sales in Miami and Spain.

In 2018, Havanna had incomes for AR$4,000 million only in Argentina, producing 40,000 dozens of alfajores per day. In 2020, Havanna had 370 subsidiaries, 250 in Argentina and 120 in other countries.

=== Expanding the business: the coffee stores ===
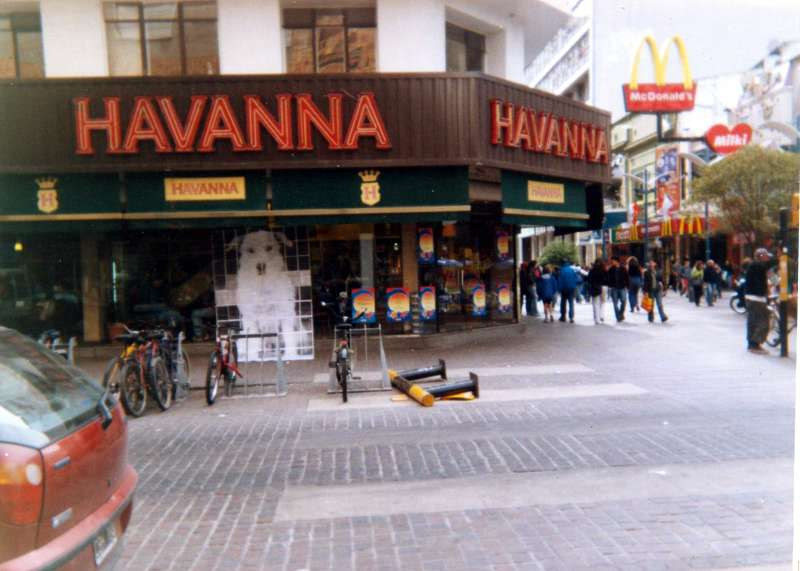
Havanna store in Mar del Plata, November 2005

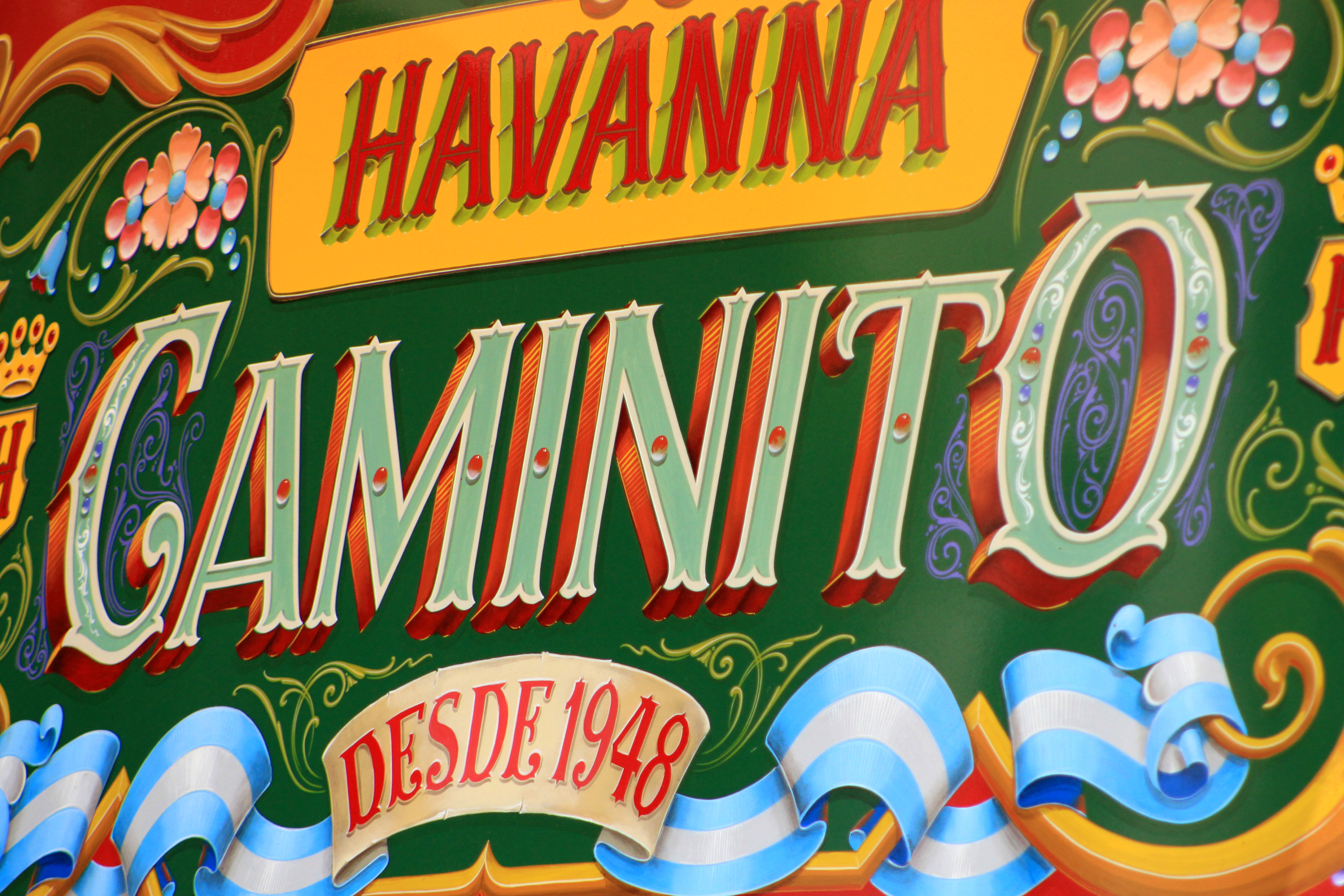
Sign at the Havanna store in Caminito, La Boca, Buenos Aires

One key to Havanna's long presence in the market has been the opening of coffee stores (which sell not only different varieties of coffee, but also the classic and popular Havanna products like alfajores, lemon cookies, brownies, cakes and other chocolate and dulce de leche desserts). The concept was named "Café Havanna" and the business expanded successfully, with 230 points-of-sale throughout Argentina and in other Latin American countries, in Spain and the United States.

While many restaurants closed because of low sales, the franchise stores increased considerably. The greatest success has been the coffee stores, selling their products under different brand names, according to a report written by the Argentine Franchise Association

Havanna was cited as the biggest success among the coffee stores. After financial problems during the economic crisis in 2001, the company successfully positioned its brand and became one of the leaders in franchising stores outside Argentina.

One reason for the success of Havanna stores is the high per capita consumption of coffee in Buenos Aires (about 1 kg per person in a year). This average is higher than 2009 statistics but below the record reached in 1969 (1.7 kg). On the other hand, in the rest of the provinces of Argentina the consumption of coffee decreases, due to people there preferring other beverages (like mate) rather than coffee.

In December 2016, the company opened a new plant in Parque Industrial of Batán, near Mar del Plata. With a surface of 55,000 m2, it was expected to increase production by 50%. By that time, Havanna had 200 franchised stores in Argentina, producing more than 100 million alfajores per year.

== Products ==
The following is a list with the most representative products manufactured by Havanna:

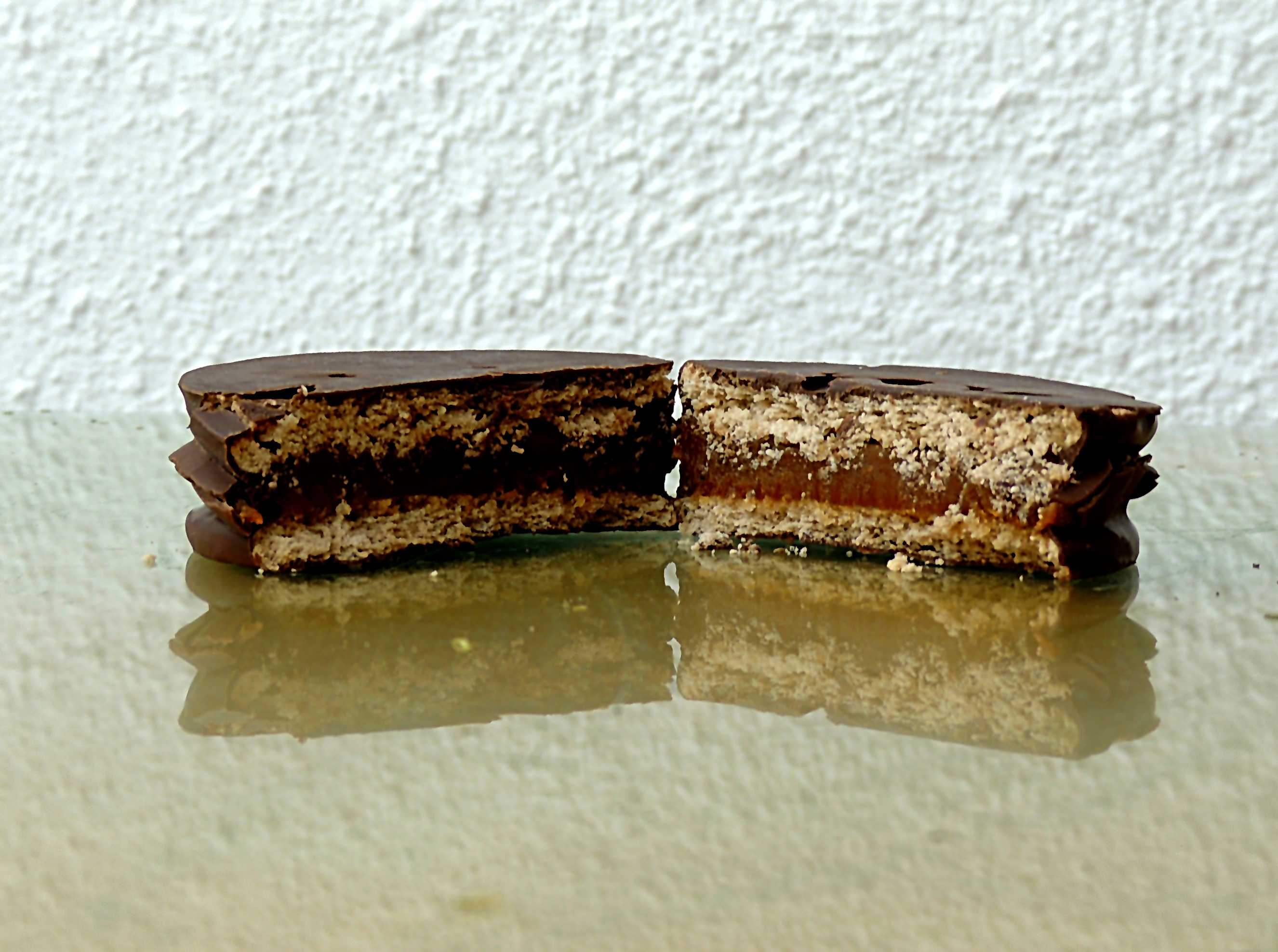
Havanna Chocolate alfajor (filled with Dulce de Leche)

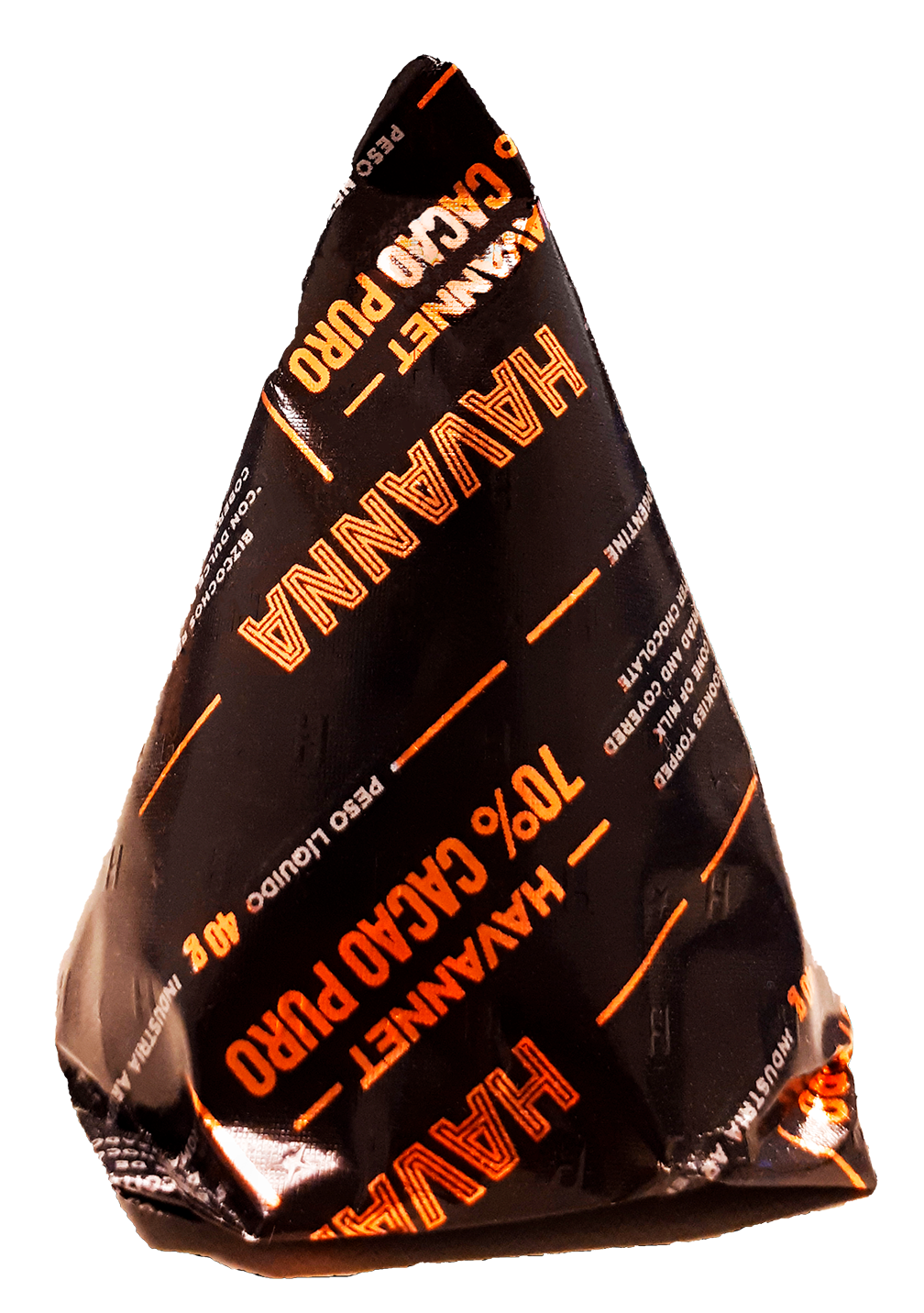
Havannets, 70% cocoa chocolate flavor

Product	Flavour
Alfajor	Chocolate, 70% cocoa chocolate, dulce de leche, chocolate mousse, white chocolate (filled with dulce de leche), white chocolate with nut (filled with dulce de leche), quince jam.
Havannet	Chocolate, 70% cocoa chocolate
Cookies	Lemon, chocolate
Giant-size alfajor	Chocolate
Cakes	Chantilly cream
Easter eggs (seasonal)	Chocolate
Puddings	Traditional recipe
Dulce de leche	Traditional recipe
Coffee	Espresso

== See also ==
- List of coffeehouse chains
