= When I Leave =

1954 Mexican film

- Directed by: Tito Davison
- Written by: Ernesto Cortázar; Tito Davison; Fernando Galiana
- Starring: Libertad Lamarque; Miguel Torruco; Prudencia Grifell
- Cinematography: José Ortiz Ramos
- Edited by: Carlos Savage
- Music by: Manuel Esperón
- Production company: Mier y Brooks
- Release date: 4 June 1954
- Running time: 110 minutes
- Country: Mexico
- Language: Spanish

When I Leave (Spanish: Cuando me vaya) is a 1954 Mexican musical drama film directed by Tito Davison and starring Libertad Lamarque, Miguel Torruco and Prudencia Grifell. It portrays the life of the bolero composer María Grever.

== Cast ==
- Libertad Lamarque as María Grever
- Miguel Torruco as León Grever
- Lilia Martínez 'Gui-Gui' as Laurita
- Prudencia Grifell as Doña Generosa
- Alberto Carrière as Ralph
- María Gentil Arcos as Doña Julia
- Miguel Ángel Ferriz as Doctor Fuentes
- Hortensia Santoveña as Mercedes
- Héctor Godoy as Carlos Grever
- José Pidal
- Marion del Valle as Claudia
- Norma Ancira as Amiga de Claudia
- Julián de Meriche as Maestro de orquesta
- Andrés Soler as Locutor radio
- Alfonso Ortiz Tirado as Cantante
- Chucho Martínez Gil as Cantante
- Nestor Mesta Chayres as Cantante
- Juan Arvizu as Cantante
- Eduardo Alcaraz as Sr. Dobie
- Daniel Arroyo as Invitado ceremonia
- Manuel Arvide as Don Alejandro Castillo
- Stephen Berne as Cargador
- Carmen Cabrera as Invitada en compromiso
- Rodolfo Calvo as Hombre en subasta
- Manuel Casanueva as Doctor
- Jorge Chesterking as Cole Porter
- Julio Daneri as Señor Davis
- Felipe de Flores as Amigo de Mojica
- Rosario Gálvez
- Ana María Hernández as Amiga de María en Nueva York
- Cecilia Leger as Invitada a compromiso
- Elvira Lodi as Secretaria
- Chel López as Chofer
- Paco Martinez as Fotógrafo
- Héctor Mateos as Subastador
- Álvaro Matute as Dr. Wilson
- Martha Mijares
- Felipe Montoya as Señor Anselmi
- Rubén Marquez as Hombre en subasta
- Salvador Quiroz as Don Matías
- Joaquín Roche as Mensajero del señor Mojica
- Nicolás Rodríguez as Doctor
- Manuel Sánchez Navarro as Hombre en subasta
- Hernán Vera
- Fernando Yapur as Cargador
- Enrique Zambrano as Anunciador cerem

== Bibliography ==
- Robert Irwin & Maricruz Ricalde. Global Mexican Cinema: Its Golden Age. British Film Institute, 2013.
