= La Calle de los amores =

1954 Mexican film by Raphael J. Sevilla

- Directed by: Raphael J. Sevilla
- Written by: Ladislao López Negrete (novel), Raphael J. Sevilla
- Produced by: Antonio Matouk
- Starring: Carlos Orellana
- Cinematography: Ezequiel Carrasco
- Edited by: Fernando Martínez
- Release date: 18 August 1954
- Running time: 102 minute
- Country: Mexico
- Language: Spanish

La Calle de los amores ("The Street of Love") is a 1954 Mexican film. It stars Carlos Orellana.

== Cast ==
- Luis Beristáin
- Victorio Blanco
- Armando Calvo
- Jorge Casanova
- Felipe de Flores
- Teresa de Sevilla
- Rafael Estrada
- Jacqueline Evans
- Esther Fernández
- Maria Antonieta Herrera
- María Herrero
- Juan José Hurtado
- José Luis Jiménez
- Cecilia Leger
- Álvaro Matute
- Carlos Orellana
- Elda Peralta
- Lilian Plancarte
- Beatriz Ramos
- Raúl Ramirez
- Emma Roldán
- Raphael J. Sevilla
- Virginia Sánchez Navarro
