= Alfredo B. Crevenna =

Mexican film director

- Born: 22 April 1914; Frankfurt, Germany
- Died: 30 August 1996 (aged 82); Mexico
- Occupations: Film director, screenwriter
- Years active: 1939-1995

Alfredo B. Crevenna (22 April 1914 – 30 August 1996) was a German-born Mexican film director and screenwriter. He directed more than 150 films between 1945 and 1995.

== Selected filmography ==
- The Night of the Mayas (dir. Chano Urueta, 1939)
- Neither Blood Nor Sand (dir. Alejandro Galindo, 1941, screenwriter only)
- Santa (dir. Norman Foster, 1943)
- Adam, Eve and the Devil (1945)
- The Lady of the Veil (1949)
- Another Spring (1950)
- Traces of the Past (1950)
- Girls in Uniform (1951)
- Woman Without Tears (1951)
- Angélica (1952)
- My Wife and the Other One (1952)
- Forbidden Fruit (1953)
- Orquídeas para mi esposa (1954)
- The Rebellion of the Hanged (1954)
- If You Came Back to Me (1954)
- Una mujer en la calle (1955)
- Talpa (1956)
- Where the Circle Ends (1956)
- Yambaó (1957)
- Adventure at the Center of the Earth (1965)
- La venus maldita (1967)
- No se mande, profe (1969)
- Yesenia (1971)
- La Satánica (1973)
- Puerto maldito (1977)
- El secuestro de un policía (1991)

== Bibliography ==
- Mora, Carl J. (2015). Mexican Cinema: Reflections of a Society, 1896-2004 (3rd ed.). McFarland. ISBN 978-0-7864-9187-2.
