= Juan de Dios Filiberto =

Argentine musician (1885–1964)

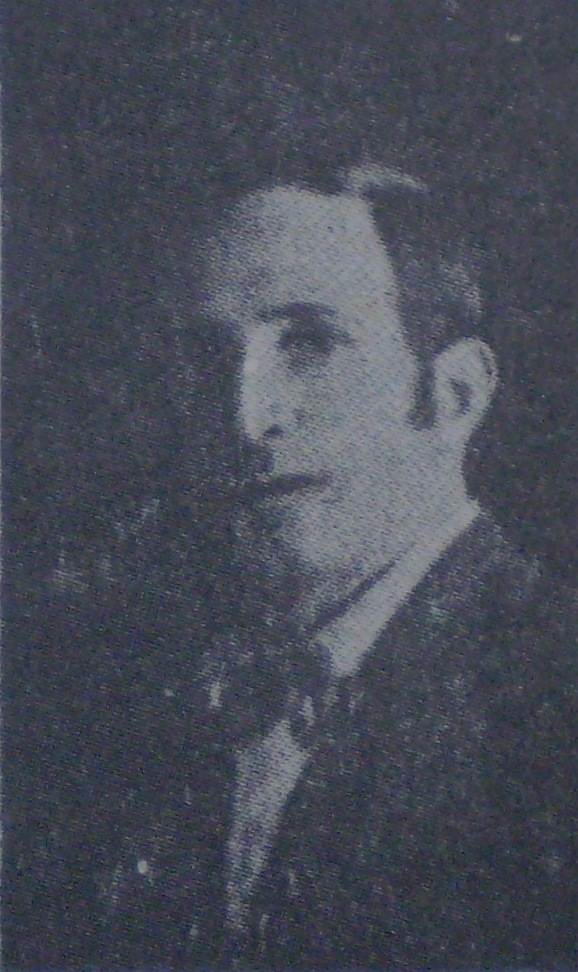
Juan de Dios Filiberto

Juan de Dios Filiberto (8 March 1885 – 11 November 1964) was an Argentine violinist, conductor, poet and composer who became prominent in the Argentine tango genre.

== Life and work ==
He was born Óscar Juan de Dios Filiberti in 1885 to Josefa Roballo, a mestizo descendant of one of the founding fathers of Argentina, Martín Rodríguez, and Juan Filiberti, a Genoese immigrant.

An uncle introduced him to tango at the age of six, though he was forced to leave school at age nine, entering the labor force as a newsie and, later, bricklayer. He later worked as a stevedore and, eventually, shift supervisor for the local Mihánovich shipyards.

The advent of organized labor in Argentina and poor working conditions helped lead Filiberto and most of his colleagues to join the stevedores' union affiliated with the Argentine Workers' Federation, where he supported an anarchist line and actively participated in a series of strikes in 1907.

Given his first music lessons by Héctor Polzinetti, a carpenter at the dockyards, Filiberto and a number of friends created a musical ensemble known as "Orfeón Los del Futuro" ("The Orpheum of the Future"), for whom he played a pipe organ in theatres. A gift of a ticket to a Teatro Coliseo performance of Amilcare Ponchielli's opera La Gioconda resulted in an argument the following day, when Filiberto's negative opinion of the tenor's voice met with his friend's dismissive reply. Dejected, Filiberto made it a goal to become a trained musician, and, in his words, "at that moment I made up my mind about my future."

He secured a post as a machine assistant at Buenos Aires' famed Colón Theater, where a performance of Ludwig van Beethoven's Ninth Symphony inspired him to join the local Pezzini-Stianessi music conservatory, in 1909. There, he studied the violin, music theory and solfège and eventually, he was granted a scholarship to attend maestro Alberto Williams' prestigious National Conservatory, where he was given lessons on counterpoint, piano and guitar.

Chronic health problems and the advice of Dr. José Ingenieros, his friend and a prominent local physician, led Filiberto to relocate to the dry climes of Guaymallén, a suburb of Mendoza. The name of the town inspired the title of his first composition, Guaymallén, written in 1915 in homage to a group of friends. A tango with distinctly indigenous chords, Filiberto crafted music which could "emphasize the nativist character of the new Argentine musician."

His health recovered, he returned to Buenos Aires in 1920, where local tango orchestra leader Eduardo Arolas agreed to play a number of his compositions. Some of his early tangos written for Arolas were: "Cura segura" ("Sure Medicine"), "De mi tierra" ("From My Land"), "Suelo argentino" ("Argentine Soil"), "Se recomienda solo" ("It's Better Alone"), "Quejas de bandoneón" ("The Bandoneón's Woes"), among numerous others. A well-known name in tango by 1921, he wrote: "El besito" ("The Little Kiss"), "La porteñita" ("Little Girl from Buenos Aires"), "Clavel del aire" ("A Carnation from the Wind"), and his most enduring composition, "Caminito" ("Little path").

With lyrics by Gabino Coria Peñaloza, the 1926 ode to a La Rioja Province rural road to which sentimental memories were attached, it became one of the most recognizable tangos. In 1955, it helped inspire local artist Benito Quinquela Martín to restore a La Boca neighborhood alley, the Caminito, creating an enduring city landmark.

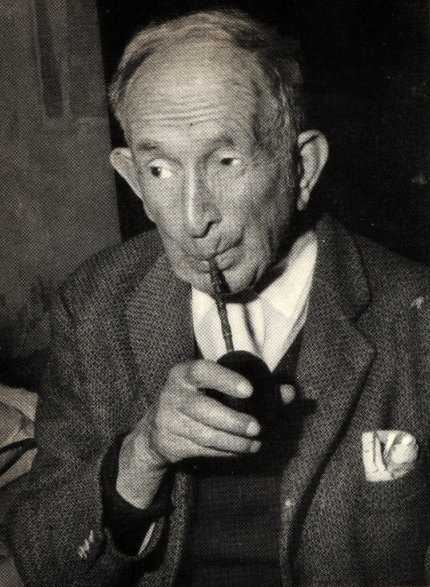
Filiberto sipping yerba mate in later life.

Following this success and that of "Botines viejos" ("Old lace shoes") in 1932, Filiberto formed his own group, the "Orquesta Porteña". A departure from the normal "Orquesta típica" format, his included uncommon instruments to the genre at the time, such as clarinets and flutes. He made his debut with this group at the Café Tortoni, performing in the city's numerous theatres and in Mar del Plata, during the summer tourist season. His orchestra was brought on for Luis Moglia Barth's ¡Tango!, a 1933 film notable for its being the first made with Movietone sound in Argentina.

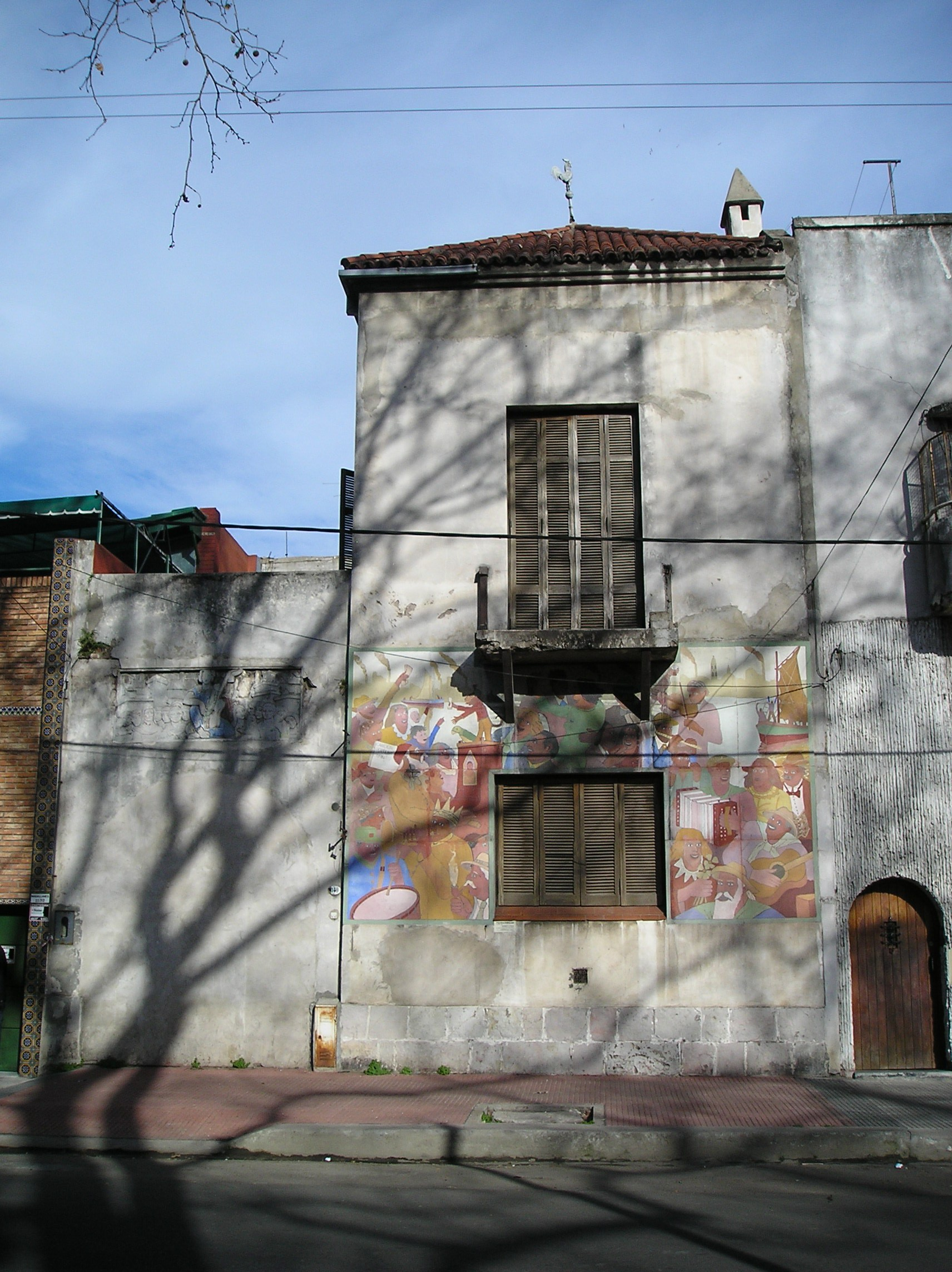
Filiberto's home was acquired by the city in 2007.

His orchestra became a fixture on Buenos Aires radio stations, during the 1930s, and they recorded twenty-five numbers for the Odeon label, between 1932 and 1936. RCA Victor recorded twenty more between 1941 and 1959, almost all of them were instrumentals, and featuring Patrocinio Díaz and, later, Jorge Alonso as lead vocalists. A vigorous advocate of Copyright Law, he was a founding member of the Argentine Society of Authors and Music Composers (SADAIC), in 1936.

The creation of the Municipal Popular Orchestra of Folk Art in 1939 led to Filiberto's appointment as its director, a position he kept when President Juan Perón made it the National Popular Music Orchestra (Pops), in 1948. His retirement as director on October 18, 1959 was honored with an homage at Caminito Street, closing with the unveiling of a bust of the artist at the site of an open-air art gallery.

== Death ==
Filiberto died in 1964, at age 79. Ten years after his death and in his honor, the Juan de Dios Filiberto National Orchestra of Argentine Music was founded.

== Legacy ==
His modest home on 1140 Magallanes Street was acquired by the city in April 2007. His address in La Boca from 1932 until his death, the house was notable also for a mural created for him by his friend, artist Benito Quinquela Martín.
