= La Bruja (film) =

- Directed by: Chano Urueta
- Written by: Alfredo Salazar (story), Chano Urueta
- Produced by: Sergio Kogan
- Starring: Lilia del Valle, Ramón Gay, Julio Villarreal
- Cinematography: Víctor Herrera
- Edited by: Jorge Bustos
- Music by: Raúl Lavista
- Release date: 6 October 1954
- Running time: 82 minutes
- Country: Mexico
- Language: Spanish

La Bruja ("The Witch") is a 1954 Mexican film. It was directed by Chano Urueta.

== Plot ==
A brilliant doctor creates an incredible formula but refused to sell it to an important pharmaceutical company and the company in revenge, kills the doctor's daughter. The scientist consumed by a terrible pain, decided to plan a sinister vengeance. In order to do so he found a horrible woman known as the witch. He used all his scientific knowledge to create a system to convert the woman into a beauty. The witch is introduced to the pharmaceutical company with success and she fell in love with one of the top executives, but the problem is that the formula only lasts for a short period of time.

The ending will be anything but happy...

== Cast ==
- Lilia del Valle - La Bruja (The Witch)
- Ramón Gay
- Julio Villarreal
- Charles Rooner
- Fernando Wagner
- Luis Aceves Castañeda
- José René Ruiz - Rene Ruiz 'Tun Tun'
- Ángel Di Stefani - Angel Stefani
- Guillermo Hernández - Guillermo Hernandez Lobo Negro
- Guillermina Téllez Girón
- Diana Ochoa
- Emilio Garibay
- José Pardavé
