= The River and Death =

1954 film

- Film poster
- Spanish: El río y la muerte
- Directed by: Luis Buñuel
- Written by: Luis Alcoriza
- Produced by: J. Ramón Aguirre, Armando Orive Alba
- Starring: Columba Domínguez; Miguel Torruco; Joaquín Cordero; Víctor Alcocer; Jaime Fernández
- Cinematography: Raúl Martínez Solares
- Edited by: Jorge Bustos
- Music by: Raúl Lavista
- Release date: September 1954
- Running time: 91 minutes
- Country: Mexico
- Language: Spanish

The River and Death (Spanish: El río y la muerte) is a 1954 Mexican film. It was written by Luis Alcoriza and directed by Luis Buñuel. The film is an adaptation of Miguel Álvarez Acosta's 1952 novel Muro blanco en roca negra (White Wall on a Black Rock).

== Cast ==
- Columba Domínguez as Mercedes
- Miguel Torruco as Felipe Anguiano
- Joaquín Cordero as Gerardo Anguiano
- Jaime Fernández as Romulo Menchaca
- Víctor Alcocer as Polo Menchaca
- Silvia Derbez as Elsa
- José Elías Moreno as Don Nemesio
- Carlos Martínez Baena as Don Julian
- Alfredo Varela as Chinelas (as Alfredo Varela Jr.)
- Miguel Manzano as don Anselmo

== Background ==
The film, an adaptation of a novel about blood revenge that has lasted for several generations, is so country-specific that the audience at the Venice Film Festival thought it was a comedy. Buñuel takes great pains in his autobiography to show that the despicable events portrayed in the film were even surpassed by reality.
