= Cita en la frontera =

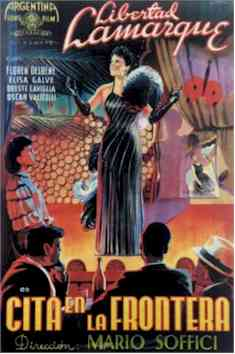
- Directed by: Mario Soffici
- Written by: Enrique Amorim, Carlos A. Olivari
- Release date: 1940
- Running time: 90 minute
- Country: Argentina
- Language: Spanish

Cita en la frontera is a 1940 Argentine film of the Golden Age of Argentine cinema directed by Mario Soffici and starring Libertad Lamarque.

== Cast ==
- Orestes Caviglia
- Floren Delbene
- Maria Esther Duckse
- Elisa Galvé
- Eliseo Herrero
- Libertad Lamarque
- Claudio Martino
- José Otal
- Oscar Valicelli
