= Miguel Torruco =

Mexican film actor (1920–1956)

Miguel Torruco Castellanos
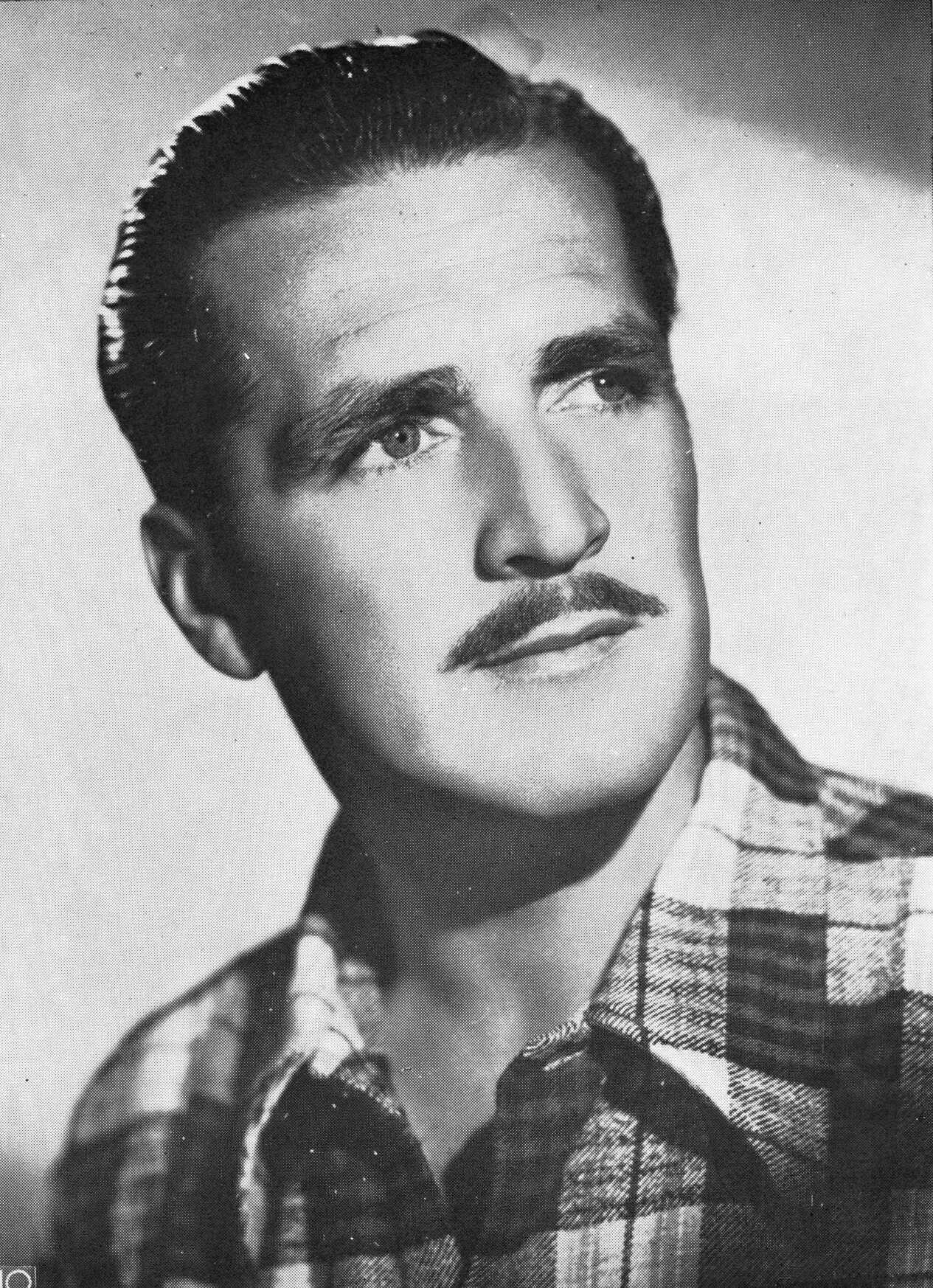
- Miguel Torruco in 1954
- Born: 20 January 1920; Palenque, Chiapas, Mexico
- Died: 22 April 1956 (aged 36); Orizaba, Veracruz, Mexico
- Occupation: Actor
- Years active: 1951–1956 (film)

Miguel Torruco Castellanos (1920–1956) was a Mexican film actor. He was one of the stars of the Golden Age of Mexican cinema until his sudden death at the age of thirty six after falling off a horse. He was married to the actress María Elena Marqués, with whom he had two children, Marisela Torruco Marqués and Miguel Torruco Marqués.

== Selected filmography ==
- Acapulco (1952)
- The Naked Woman (1953)
- Remember to Live (1953)
- The River and Death (1954)
- When I Leave (1954)

== Bibliography ==
- Goble, Alan. The Complete Index to Literary Sources in Film. Walter de Gruyter, 1999.
