= Woman Without Tears =

1951 Mexican historical drama film

- Directed by: Alfredo B. Crevenna
- Written by: Edmundo Báez; Egon Eis
- Produced by: Óscar Dancigers
- Starring: Libertad Lamarque; Marga López; Ernesto Alonso
- Cinematography: José Ortiz Ramos
- Edited by: Carlos Savage
- Music by: Manuel Esperón
- Production company: Ultramar Films
- Release date: 30 August 1951
- Country: Mexico
- Language: Spanish

Woman Without Tears (Spanish: La mujer sin lágrimas) is a 1951 Mexican historical drama film directed by Alfredo B. Crevenna and starring Libertad Lamarque, Marga López and Ernesto Alonso.

== Cast ==
- Libertad Lamarque as Consuelo
- Marga López as Beatriz
- Ernesto Alonso as Carlos
- Francisco Jambrina as Alejandro
- Maruja Grifell as Claudia
- Eduardo Alcaraz as Señor cura
- Miguel Ángel López as Javier
- Alma Delia Fuentes as Rita
- Daniel Arroyo as Coronel
- Carmen Cabrera as Profesora
- Lupe Carriles as Doña Pachita
- Ethel Carrillo as Jerónima
- Enedina Díaz de León as Sirvienta de Beatriz
- Conchita Gentil Arcos as Sarita
- Georgina González as Invitada a boda
- Ana María Hernández as Invitada al recital
- Elodia Hernández as Antonia, sirvienta
- Cecilia Leger as Pueblerina
- Inés Murillo as Enfermera
- Diana Ochoa as Belinda

== Bibliography ==
- Darlene J. Sadlier. Latin American Melodrama: Passion, Pathos, and Entertainment. University of Illinois Press, 2009.
