= Libertad Lamarque =

Argentine actress (1908–2000)

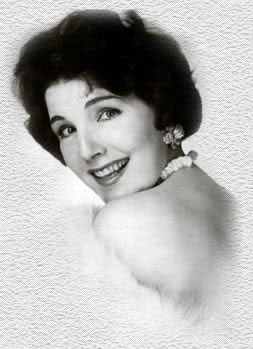
- Lamarque c. 1950
- Born: Libertad Lamarque Bouza; 24 November 1908; Rosario, Santa Fe, Argentina
- Died: 12 December 2000 (aged 92); Mexico City, Mexico
- Citizenship: Argentina; Mexico
- Occupations: Actress; singer
- Years active: 1925–2000
- Spouses: Emilio Romero (m. 1926; sep. 1935) Alfredo Malerba (m. 1945; died 1994)
- Children: 1
- Awards: Golden Ariel Award 2000
- Musical career
- Genre: Tango
- Instrument: Vocals

Libertad Lamarque Bouza (Spanish pronunciation: [liβeɾˈtað laˈmaɾke]; 24 November 1908 – 12 December 2000) was an Argentine actress and singer, specialized in the musical genre of tango. Lamarque became one of the most iconic stars of the Golden Age of cinema in both Argentina and Mexico. She achieved fame throughout Latin America, and became known as "La Novia de América" ("The Girlfriend of America"). By the time she died in 2000, she had appeared in 65 films (21 filmed in Argentina, 45 in Mexico and one in Spain) and six telenovelas, had recorded over 800 songs and had made innumerable theatrical appearances.

== Biography ==
Libertad Lamarque was born in Rosario, Santa Fe, Argentina to Gaudencio Lamarque (1874-1947), an Uruguayan of French descent, and a widow of Spanish origin, Josefa Bouza (1863-1932). She was named Libertad (which means "Liberty") because at the time of her birth, her father, an anarchist, was imprisoned and pleading for release.

=== Early career ===
At the age of 7, Lamarque won first prize in a stage competition, and participated with a group of street singers that made tours of nearby cities. In 1923, she appeared in her first professional role, the stage show Madre Tierra.

Her local acclaim convinced her parents that the family should relocate to Buenos Aires, where her chances of a career would be better. The family hung their hopes on a letter of introduction from a local journalist to the owner of the National Theatre, Pascual Carcavallo. It proved successful, as in 1926 Libertad was hired to sing in the choir and given a one-year contract. Her debut was in a play called La muchacha de Montmartre (The Girl from Montmartre) by José A. Saldías, where she sang as part of a trio with Olinda Bozán and Antonia Volpe, to the guitar accompaniment of Rafael Iriarte. Within a couple of months, she had begun singing on Radio Prieto, and was signed for record production with Victor Records, which released her first album, Gaucho Sol, on 26 September 1926, as well as the single Chilenito.

In 1929, she began working in Alberto Vaccarezza's, El conventillo de la Paloma ("The Tenement of the Dove"), which was about the life of a girl Doce Pesos, living in an immigrant tenement house. After two years and 1,000 performances, Lamarque quit the show to focus on her music career. She traveled through several provinces of Argentina and through neighboring Paraguay accompanied by three. In 1930, following this tour she entered a competition held at the Teatro Colón in Buenos Aires, won first prize for her performances of the tangos "La cumparsita" and "Tocaneando", and earned the title "Queen of Tango". She capped this cycle by performing Oscar Straus's Tres valses (Three Waltzes), an adaptation of the operetta, with Chilean singer Choly Mur.

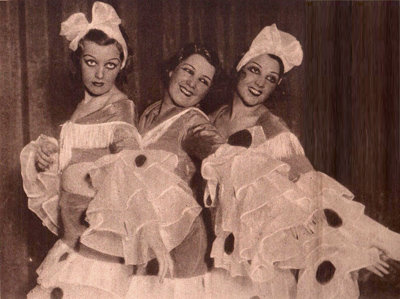
Libertad Lamarque and other actresses of her time in a revista porteña at the Teatro Maipo in 1933

In the mid-1930s Lamarque was accompanied by a trio of musicians including bandoneon player Héctor María Artola, violinist Antonio Rodio, and pianist, Alfredo Malerba, who would become her second husband. She shone in works that were painful and romantic, such as En esta tarde gris (In this gray afternoon), Sombras, nada más (Shadows, nothing else), Tristezas de la calle Corrientes (Sorrows of Corrientes Street) or Caserón de tejas (Mansion of Tiles), Canción desesperada (Desperate Song) and Sin palabras (Without words). Many of her best songs were by composer Enrique Santos Discepolo because they particularly suited her style.

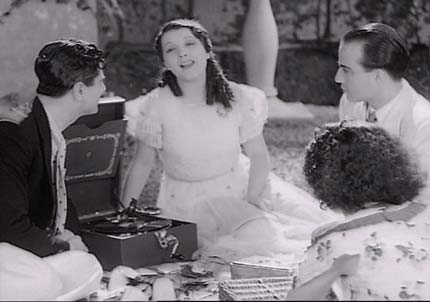
Libertad Lamarque in Ayúdame a vivir (1936)

She filmed Adiós, Argentina, which was directed by Italian Mario Parpagnoli in 1929, which was released the following year, and the first Argentine film with sound ¡Tango! in 1932, which resulted in her being the first singer to be recorded for a sound film in Argentina. Lamarque was a light soprano with a vocal range from approximately middle C (C4) to "high A" (A5). After ¡Tango!'s release in 1933, a string of films followed, including El alma del bandoneon (1935), Ayúdame a vivir (1936), Besos brujos (1937), La ley que olvidaron (1937), Madreselva (1938), Puerta cerrada (1939), Caminito de la gloria (1939), La casa del recuerdo (1940), Cita en la frontera (1940), Una vez en la vida (1941), Yo conocí a esa mujer (1942), En el viejo Buenos Aires (1942), Eclipse de sol (1942), El fin de la noche (1944), La cabalgata del circo (1945) and many more.

=== Legendary rift with Eva Perón ===
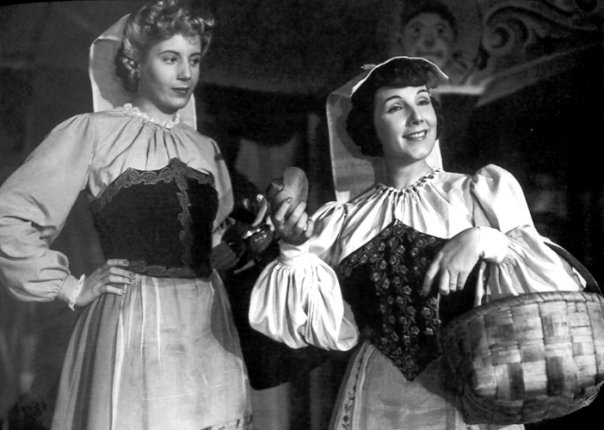
Eva Perón and Libertad Lamarque in film La cabalgata del circo (1945)

Legend has it that Lamarque left Argentina because she had been blacklisted by its First Lady Eva Perón. Marysa Navarro and Nicholas Frasier, authors of Evita: The Real Life of Eva Perón, however, contend this is unlikely. They argue that Lamarque moved to Mexico, where she was adored by the audiences because Mexican cinema was in a better state during the 1940s and 1950s than Argentine cinema. The authors add that Lamarque traveled freely between Argentina and Mexico during the lifetime of Eva Perón and beyond, which does not support the blacklisting legend.

Lamarque denied during her lifetime certain aspects of the legend, especially the reports that she had slapped Eva on the set of La cabalgata del circo. In her 1986 autobiography, she flatly denied the allegations and explained that she was simply mortified by Eva's lack of discipline during production of the film.

According to Lamarque, Eva refused to take her work seriously and always arrived late or stalled the filming for trivial or personal reasons. Complaints to either the producer or the director produced no result as they were giving Eva preferential treatment as the girlfriend of Juan Perón.

By 1946, Eva and Juan Perón were ensconced in the Presidential Palace, rumors circulated that Evita had forbidden radio stations and film studios to play Lamarque's music or hire her, and Lamarque's films, music and publicity in Argentina seemed to have come to an end.

=== Relocation to Mexico ===
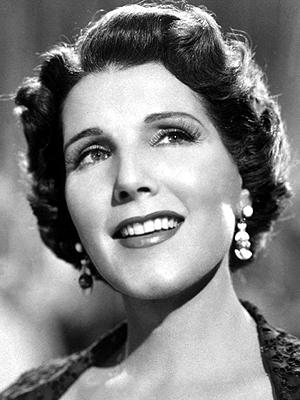
Lamarque, c. 1947

Between January and February 1946, Lamarque appeared in her first tour of Cuba, which was listed as the artistic event of the season. On 7 January, she debuted in the Teatro América with a varied repertoire, but closed the show with "Facundo" by Cuban composer Eliseo Grenet to much applause. She performed shows daily, sometimes twice a day and on her final performance at Teatro América, 20 January, she held three performances. She performed at Camagüey, Ciego de Ávila, Santa Clara, Holguín, and Santiago de Cuba; visited hospitals and schools; and her farewell performance at the Municipal Amphitheatre of Havana was said to have been attended by 20,000 fans. It was on this trip that the Cuban press first dubbed her "America's Sweetheart."

Just before the Cuban trip, Hollywood had offered Lamarque a seven-year contract but she refused it as she did not speak English and was afraid she would be taken advantage of. Despite her fears of working in the U.S., Lamarque sold out Carnegie Hall for a 1947 performance. When Mexico, on the other hand, offered her a picture deal to appear with legendary Spanish filmmaker Luis Buñuel, she agreed, and moved to Mexico in 1946. The picture, Gran Casino, co-starring Jorge Negrete was a flop, but other roles followed, such as Soledad (1947), La dama del velo (1948), Huellas de un pasado (1950), Mujeres sin lágrimas (1951), Nunca es tarde para amar (1952), Ansiedad (1952), and Rostros olvidados (1952). Some of her best work during this period was in Otra primavera, filmed in 1949, La loca (1951) and Cuando me vaya (1953); for each of these she was nominated for an Ariel Award for Best Actress in 1951, 1953, and 1955, respectively.

Some of her last movies included Bodas de oro (1955), Amor de sombra (1959), Yo pecador (1959), Rosas blancas para mi hermana negra (1969), with Cuban singer Eusebia Cosme and her last two Argentine films, La sonrisa de mamá (1972) and La mamá de la novia (1978). But as she wound down her movie career, she began touring with music again. In the late 1950s, she did a concert tour with Puerto Rican singer Jesús Quiñones Ledesma and worked in Chile, Puerto Rico, Venezuela, Dominican Republic, Guatemala, El Salvador, Honduras and returned to Cuba to do theater and record several albums.

She returned to Argentina after Evita's death and was the first person to bring a Spanish version of Hello Dolly to Latin audiences at a 1967 performance at the Teatro Nacional in Buenos Aires, which she also later performed in Mexico in 1968 staged by Manolo Fabregás.

In 1982, she starred in the musical revue, Libertad Lamarque, ¿es una mujer de suerte? at the Teatro Lola Membrives in Buenos Aires. She wrote the script, which was adapted by Nicolás Carreras under the musical direction of Oscar Cardozo Ocampo. In 1988, Lamarque participated in the season at Mar del Plata's Teatro Opera with the musical A todo tango II under the direction of José Colángelo.

In the 1960s she appeared in several episodes of a television show called Saturday Circular with Nicholas Mancera and in 1961, she filmed Así era mi madre, her only Spanish film. Her first venture into soap operas came in Venezuela, when she was offered a role in Esmeralda in 1972. That was followed by another Venezuelan production called Mamá.

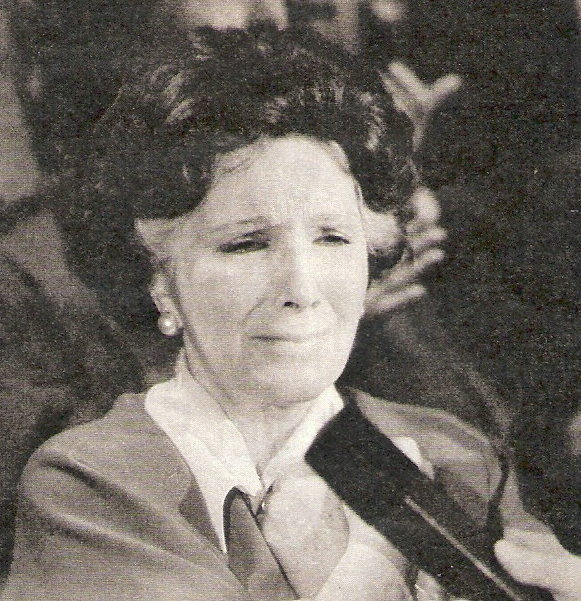
Lamarque in 1982

In 1980, she began the first of her Mexican telenovelas, Soledad, followed by her role in Carita de Angel at the age of 91 where she played a Mother superior. Her last role, as la abuela Piedad in La Usurpadora (The Usurper) was in 1998 – two years before her death.

Lamarque received an award in 1978 from Venezuelan President Carlos Andres Perez for her contributions to Latin American culture and in 1980 she shared a Critic's Choice Award with María Félix. In 1985, she received the Konex Platinum Award for Best Tango Singer in Argentina. In 1988, she put her hand prints on the "Walk of Fame of the Hermitage Hotel".

In 1989, she was honored at the Festival of San Sebastián, Spain, for her film achievements and was recognized by the Caesar Awards given by the Association of American theater to Latin American artists in Los Angeles. That same year, a tile bearing her name was placed in the "Sidewalk of Latin Stars" in Miami and a tribute was held for her at the Autumn Festival of Paris.

She was appointed "Illustrious citizen of the city of Buenos Aires" in 1990 and on 15 November 1991, a few days before her birthday, the Municipal Council of Rosario granted her a similar distinction. Lamarque was honored in 1993 by Celebrando Magazine, a Spanish-language publication which is nationally distributed in the U.S., for her 70 years in film, theater and music and her philanthropy.

In 1998, she was appointed as Honorary Cultural Advisor and designated as a Cultural Legend in Buenos Aires.

=== Last years and death ===
In 1996 Libertad moved to the United States and settled in her Coral Gables home in Miami, Florida. She often flew to Mexico City and Buenos Aires to attend her professional appointments as well. Her daughter, grandsons and great-grandsons lived in Argentina.

In 1998 Lamarque was featured in the soap opera La usurpadora, which was a huge success in Mexico and in many countries in Latin America. Her last role on TV was on the telenovela Carita de Ángel, where she played Mother Superior.

In early December 2000, Libertad Lamarque was rushed to Santa Elena Hospital in Mexico City, after feeling sick and experiencing breathing difficulties. She died aged 92 on 12 December 2000 in Mexico City, Mexico from pneumonia. Her daughter, Mirtha Libertad Lamarque Romero Deluca, died on 19 October 2014, aged 86.

=== Personal life ===
In 1926, Lamarque married Emilio Romero and had a daughter, Mirtha, with him before divorcing in 1945. Divorce was not possible at that time in Argentina and although the marriage was quickly over, it took 12 years to officially be ended. In 1935, she suffered several personal crises which led to a suicide attempt in Chile. She attempted to throw herself out of a hotel window, but an awning broke her fall. Shortly thereafter, her estranged husband kidnapped their daughter and took Mirtha to Uruguay. A group of friends, including Alfredo Malerba, and her attorney were able to help her regain custody. Lamarque's second husband was Alfredo Malerba, with whom she was married for nearly 50 years, until his death.

== Awards ==
- Best Foreign Actress, Puerta cerrada, 1940, Zagreb WON
- Best Actress, Otra primavera, 1951, Ariel nomination
- Best Actress, La loca, 1953, Ariel nomination
- Best Actress, Cuando me vaya, 1955, Ariel nomination
- Critic's Choice Award, Won shared award with María Félix, 1980
- Konex Platinum Award, Best Tango Singer, 1985, Argentina WON
- Lifetime Achievement, 2000 Ariel WON

== Filmography ==
=== Films in Argentina ===
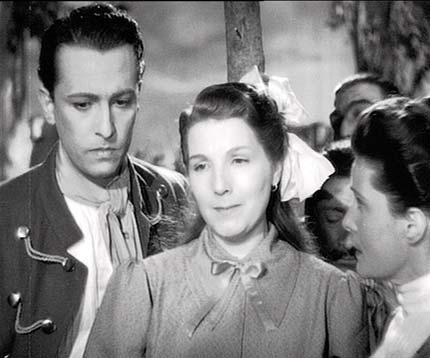
Libertad Lamarque and Hugo del Carril in La cabalgata del circo (1945)

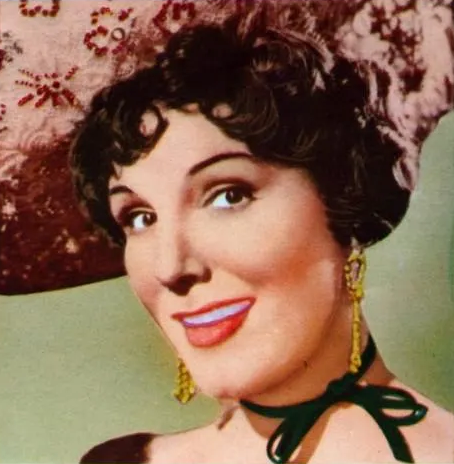
Lamarque, c. 1963

- ¡Tango! (1933)
- Musical Romance (1947)

=== Films in Mexico ===
- Gran Casino – 1946
- Soledad – 1947
- The Lady of the Veil – 1948 ... Andrea del Monte
- Another Spring – 1949 ... Amelia
- La marquesa del barrio – 1950 ... Cristina Payares/La Marquesa
- Traces of the Past – 1950
- Te sigo esperando – 1951 ... Elena Montenegro
- La loca – 1951 ... Elena Prim viuda de Villaseñor
- Woman Without Tears – 1951 ... Consuelo
- Ansiedad – 1952 ... María de Lara
- Nunca es tarde para amar – 1952 ... Malisa Morales
- Acuérdate de vivir – 1952 ... Yolanda
- Forgotten Faces – 1952 ... Rosario Velazquez
- If You Came Back to Me – 1953 ... Alejandra
- When I Leave – 1953 ... María Grever
- La Infame – 1953 ... Cristina Ferrán
- Anxiety – 1953
- Reportaje – 1953
- La mujer X – 1954
- Bodas de oro – 1955
- Música de siempre – 1955
- Historia de un amor – 1955 ...Elena Ramos
- Escuela de música – 1955 ... Laura Galván
- Bambalinas – 1956
- Mis padres se divorcian – 1957 ... Diana Váldes
- A Few Drinks – 1957 ... Eugenia Pavel
- The Woman Who Had No Childhood – 1957 ... Rosaura
- Sabrás que te quiero – 1958 ... Amelia Rey/Mónica/Gabriela
- Love in the Shadows – 1959 ... Claudia
- Yo, pecador – 1959 ... Doña Virginia
- El pecado de una madre – 1960 ... Ana María
- La cigüeña dijo sí – 1960
- El cielo y la tierra – 1962 ... Sor Lucero/Sister María de la Luz
- Canción del alma – 1963 ... María Maragón
- Los hijos que yo soñé – 1964 ... Mariana
- Canta mi corazón – 1964 ... Luisa Lamas
- Arrullo de Dios – 1966 ... Luz
- El hijo pródigo – 1968 ... Alegría Román
- Rosas blancas para mi hermana negra – 1969 ... Laura
- Hoy he soñado con Dios – 1971 ... Lina Alonso
- La loca de los milagros – 1973 ... Aurora Durban
- Negro es un bello color – 1973 ... Eugenia

=== Films in Spain ===
- Lovely Memory – 1961 ... Lucy

== Other media productions ==
=== Music ===
- "Gaucho sol" – LP (1926)
- "Chilenito" – single (1926)
- "Botellero" / "Mi Caballo Jerezano" – single (1927)
- "Mate Amargo" / "Idilio Trunco" – single (1928)
- "La Dolores" / "Tanita De La Proa" – single (1929)
- "Sol De Mi Tierra" / "No Seas Así" – single (1929)
- "El Niño De Las Monjas" / "Doña Nicanora" – single (1930)
- "No Has Perdido La Vergüenza" / "Goya" – single (1930)
- "Soñar Y Nada Más" / "Tristeza Marina" – single (1943)
- "Delicias Musicales" – LP (?)
- "Delicias Musicales (Volumen II)" – LP (1958)
- "Chansons Du Film Mon Ami Joselito" – EP (1962)
- "Ayúdame A Vivir / Caminito / Besos Brujos / Madreselva" – EP (1969)
- "Libertad Lamarque Canta Los Tangos De Agustín Lara" – LP (1969)
- "Somos Novios" – LP (1973)
- "Los Tangos de Agustin Lara" – LP (1977)
- "Delicias Musicales" – LP (1985)
- "Libertad Lamarque Sings Songs Of Maria Grever" – LP (1986)
- "En 1988 !Canta Así!" – LP (1990)

=== Telenovelas ===
- Esmeralda – 1970 ... Sister Piedad
- Mamá – 1975 ... Soledad
- Soledad – 1980 ... Soledad González/Cristina Palermo
- Amada – 1983 ... Amada
- La Usurpadora – 1998 ... Doña Piedad Vda. de Bracho
- Carita de Ángel – 2000 ... Mother Superior Piedad de la luz

=== Autobiography ===
- Lamarque, Libertad. Libertad Lamarque, Javier Vergara Publishing: Buenos Aires, Argentina, 1986 (in Spanish) (ISBN 950-1-505-995)
