= Lola Casanova =

1948 film

- Directed by: Matilde Landeta
- Written by: Enrique Cancino; Matilde Landeta; Francisco Rojas González
- Starring: Meche Barba; Isabela Corona; Enrique Cancino
- Cinematography: Ezequiel Carrasco
- Edited by: Gloria Schoemann
- Music by: Francisco Domínguez
- Production company: Tacma
- Release date: 25 May 1948
- Running time: 91 minutes
- Country: Mexico
- Language: Spanish

Lola Casanova is a 1948 Mexican western film directed by Matilde Landeta and starring Meche Barba, Isabela Corona and Enrique Cancino. The film's sets were designed by Luis Moya.

== Synopsis ==
The movie traces the history of a creole woman who starts living with an Indian man to help the Indian community in their dealings with society.

== Cast ==
- Meche Barba as Lola Casanova
- Isabela Corona as Tortola parda
- Enrique Cancino as Lobo zaino
- Armando Silvestre as Coyote Iguana
- José Baviera as Don Nestor
- Carlos Martínez Baena as Don Diego Casanova
- Ernesto Vilches
- Guillermo Calles
- Ramón Gay as Juan Vega
- Jaime Jiménez Pons as Indalecio
- Miguel Montemayor as Romerito
- Enriqueta Reza as Nana
- Agustín Fernandez as Cuna de gato
- Salvador Godínez as Casahuate
- Enedina Díaz de León
- Carlos Villarías
- Lupe Inclán as Lagartija
- Emma Rivero
- Elisa Christy as Totoaba
- Angeles Arreola
- Aurora Izquierdo
- Consuelo Múgica
- Jesús Chávez
- Felipe de Flores
- Genaro de Alba
- César del Campo
- Rodolfo Moreno
- Rogelio Fernandez as Águila blanca
- Lidia Franco as Otilia

== Bibliography ==
- Dever, Susan. Celluloid Nationalism and Other Melodramas: From Post-Revolutionary Mexico to fin de siglo Mexamerica. SUNY Press, 2012.
