= Mexicans in the Korean War =

Mexicans and Mexican Americans in the Korean War
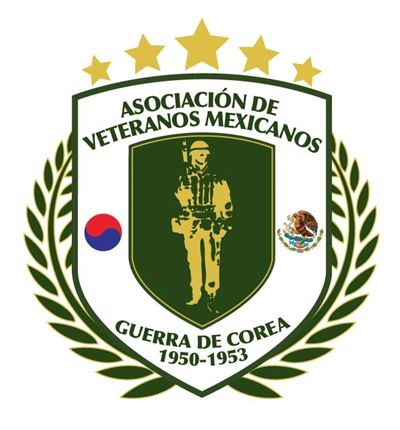
- Logo of the Association of Mexican Veterans of the Korean War
Date	1950-1953
Location	Korean Peninsula
Result	More than 100,000 Mexicans and Mexican Americans fought in the Korean War. The United States National Archives report 3,734 casualties of Hispanic or Latino origin, from which at least 2,400 were from Mexican origin.

Founding members of the Association of Mexican Veterans of the Korean War (established in 2021)
Roberto Sierra Barbosa	Jesús Cantú Salinas	Alberto Fernandéz Almada	José Villarreal Villarreal

More than 100,000 Mexican and Mexican American soldiers participated in the Korean War (1950–53) under the flag of the United Nations and the command of the United States Armed Forces. Their presence took place due to various factors, including the enrollment of young Mexicans and Americans of Mexican descent who were living in the United States between the late 1940s and 1953. Other Mexicans crossed the border into the United States to join the military as volunteers. An agreement between Mexico and the United States on military service, dating from 1943, allowed Mexicans who entered the United States Armed Forces not to lose their Mexican nationality. Soldiers of Mexican origin fought on numerous fronts in Korea, and many received US medals recognizing their bravery. After the World War II, Mexico followed a policy of non-alignment and neutrality regarding the rivalry between the two superpowers of that time, the United States and the Soviet Union. Therefore, the Mexican government did not participate in the Korean War by providing military support; however, it sent humanitarian aid to South Korea, donating food and medicine.

== Background ==
The United States' demographic composition of the 1950s and the migration of Mexicans to that country explains the large number of soldiers of Mexican descent in the United States Armed Forces.

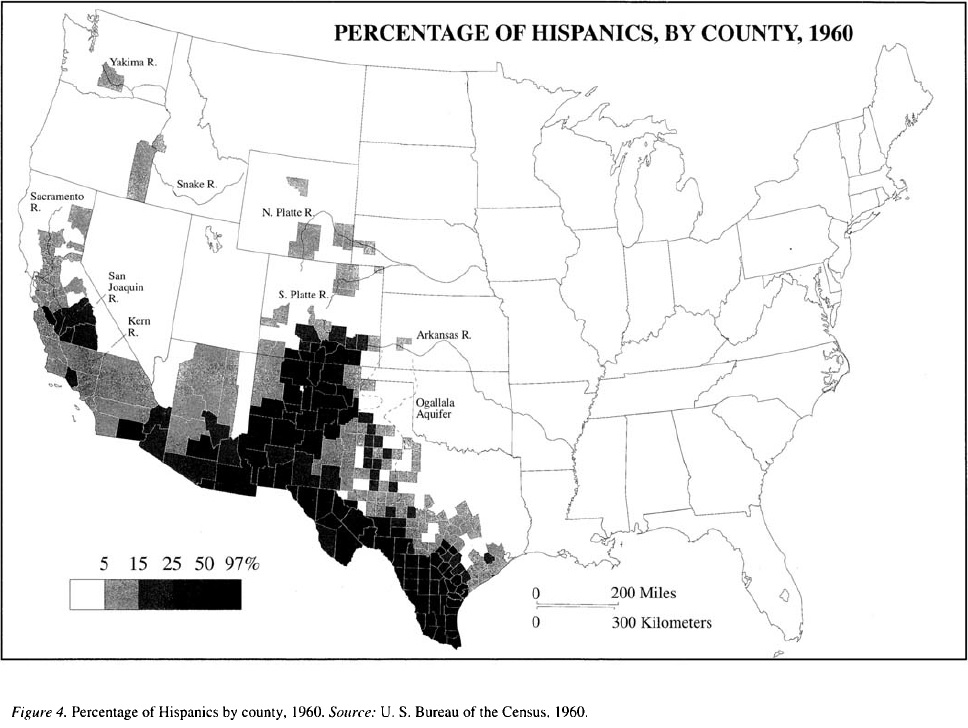
Percentage of Hispanic people per county in the United States of America, 1960.

=== Mexicans in the United States and Mexican migration ===
Before 1848, the southwestern territory of the United States was part of Mexico. After the Mexican–American War (1846–1848), Mexico lost that portion of land, but many Mexicans remained. More than 80% of them lived in the states of California and Texas.

During and after the Mexican Revolution (1910-1920), the emigration from Mexico to the United States increased. It is estimated that from 1910 to 1930 around a million Mexicans emigrated to the United States. Before the establishment of the United States Border Patrol and the system of entry quotas imposed by the US government (1924), no immigration paper or permit was required to enter the United States. Many of the migrants who crossed over with their families had American-born sons who were called to arms during World War II and the Korean War.

When there was a shortage of workers during World War II, the United States negotiated a series of agreements with Mexico focusing on the recruitment of Mexican labor to perform mainly agricultural jobs in its territory.[5] These agreements were called the Bracero Program, which permitted the legal crossing of approximately 4.5 million male workers from 1942 to 1964.[6] After their working contracts expired, many of them decided to join the United States Army as volunteers.

=== Bilateral Treaty regarding the military service ===
The participation of Mexicans in the Korean War was facilitated by the Agreement between Mexico and the United States Regarding Military Service by Nationals of Either Country Residing in the Other. Such agreement was placed in force through an exchange of diplomatic notes signed by Ezequiel Padilla, Secretary of Foreign Affairs of Mexico, and Herbert S. Bursley, Chargé d'Affaires a. i. of the United States in Mexico. The agreement was effective from January 22, 1943 to October 28, 1952; it was not renewed after that date. The agreement was negotiated after Mexico declared war against Germany and the Axis countries and it allowed Mexicans recruited into the United States Army not to lose their Mexican citizenship. According to the Article 37 of the Political Constitution of the United Mexican States, being recruited by another country is a cause of loss of nationality. Thus, the agreement stipulated that " the nationals of either country resident within the territory of the other may be registered and inducted into the armed forces of the country of their residence on the same conditions as the nationals thereof unless otherwise provided herein." and without losing their nationality.

== The Mexican Government and the Korean War ==
Even though Mexico joined the allied forces in World War II since May 1942, during the Cold War following WWII, the Mexican government decided to follow the principle of non-intervention, abstaining from aligning itself with any power and being neutral. Therefore, Mexico did not participate with military forces in the Korean war and has not participated in any other war since the end of World War II. However, the Mexican government provided humanitarian aid to South Korea in 1951 by donating food and medical supplies with a value of $350,000 of the time.

Another form of Mexican cooperation was the participation of doctors in the UN campaigns to eradicate infectious diseases such as smallpox, typhus, and typhoid in the Korean peninsula. Doctors Guillermo López Nava and Gustavo A. Rovirosa were recognized for their work.

On the other hand, the Mexican government proposed a diplomatic initiative at the United Nations to resolve the dispute over the exchange or destination of the thousands of prisoners of war, known as "The Mexican agreement onwar" or the "Alemán's Initiative" because it was promoted at the United Nations on behalf of the Mexican president Miguel Alemán Valdés. This pressing dispute prevented the parties in conflict from signing the armistice and prolonged the war for more than a year. While the People's Republic of China and North Korea demanded the return of their prisoners, South Korea and the United Nations Coalition had a voluntary case by case repatriation approach based on humanitarian reasons. The Mexican representative to the United Nations and future Secretary of Foreign Affairs, Luis Padilla Nervo, served as president of the Sixth General Assembly (September 1951 - June 1952) and presented the Mexican proposal. It was based on offering the non-repatriated North Korean and Chinese prisoners' temporary asylum and working permit in United Nations member states who were willing to receive them. Despite having the support of France, the United Kingdom, Canada, Brazil, Argentina and the United States, this proposal was not successful as it was rejected by the People's Republic of China and North Korea.

== Number of Soldiers of Mexican origin ==
=== Estimated number of soldiers ===
There is no official source, neither in Mexico nor in the United States, that specifies the number of Mexican and Mexican-descent soldiers who participated in the Korean War. Only individual records of each soldier in the archives of the United States Department of Defense indicate their place of birth. However, those who have researched on the deceased Latinos in Korea found some inconsistencies in their birthplace records. For example, seven of these, such as Sergeant Vincent Mauro Wade and Leopoldo V. Castillo, were wrongly recorded as coming from the Virgin Islands; when other sources, such as the Genaro Estrada Historical Archive of the Ministry of Foreign Relations of Mexico and the Korean War Project, list Mexico as their country of origin. At that time, Mexico had no relationship or direct communication with the Virgin Islands.

During that time, there was a racial classification on the recruitment file; most Mexicans or their descendants were registered as "Caucasian" or "white", in the absence of a specific classification for them. Other Mexicans modified their names, making it difficult to identify their origin. For example, Raúl Álvarez del Castillo, originally from Guadalajara, Jalisco, and buried in the cemetery of that city, was registered as "Ralph A. Castle". Many José became "Joe", and Juan "John", "Johnny" or "J".

The United States Department of Veterans began to use the classification of "Hispanics" (Hispanic) or "Latinos" after the Korean War. This category includes all soldiers whose ancestors spoke Spanish ("Hispanic") or are of Latin American origin ("Latino"). The first time the US Federal Government used the word "Hispanic" in a census was in 1980. "Latinos" and "Hispanics" are used interchangeably in this text, depending on the sources consulted.

The Mexican government did not have the capacity to carry out a registry of its nationals who enlisted in the United States Army. It was only aware of the deceased soldiers who returned to the country, and there is no known source nor file that collected that information.

The non-profit organization Latino Advocates for Education, in Orange, California, after years of research estimated by extrapolations of lists of soldiers that more than one hundred eighty thousand Latino soldiers participated in the Korean War. In a letter dated on November 10, 2007, addressed to Korean veterans, the US Congresswoman for California, Loretta Sánchez, stated that ""over 180,000 Hispanics Americans served in this war".

It is estimated that of the 180,000 soldiers mentioned, at least 100,000 were of Mexican origin, given that they were the most important group of Hispanics in the United States. According to figures from the Department of Defense about 61,000 were from Puerto Ricans. The rest came from other countries in Latin America, the Caribbean and Spain, which at that time had a very small demographic presence in the United States. Broadly speaking, two-thirds of the Hispanic soldiers in the Korean War were from Mexican origin and a third of them were originally from Puerto Rico.

According to data from the 1990 Census, compiled by the Department of Veterans, in that year 4.9 million veterans of the Korean War were still alive, from the original of 6.8 million soldiers. Of these, "there were an estimated 133,500 Hispanics", which corresponded to 3% of the surviving veterans.

=== Deceased Mexicans and Mexican Americans ===
According to death records in the United States National Archives, 3,734 of a total of 36,574 casualties were of "Hispanic or Latino" origin. This number represents just over 10% of US casualties. Considering that 734 Puerto Ricans lost their lives, following the proportion indicated above of one third of Puerto Rican soldiers and almost two thirds of Mexican origin, at least 2,400 casualties were of Mexican origin.

Latino Advocates for Education documents only 1,286 Latinos from the United States who died in Korea, and 734 Puerto Ricans, for a total of 2,020. The difference must lie in the use of different databases.

If Mexican and Mexican American soldiers are considered as a separate category, they rank third in the United Nations country casualties in the Korean War, after South Korea, with 227,800 deaths and the United States, with 54,246 deaths. Mexican and Mexican American casualties are followed by the United Kingdom, with 710 soldiers killed, and Australia, with 297 dead soldiers.

=== Motivations for joining the US Army ===
According to the laws of the United States, every person born in its territory is automatically an American. Therefore, every boy of a Mexican born person in the United States had the right to both nationalities and upon reaching the age of 18, when military service was compulsory in that country, he had to comply with it. The Mexican government did not recognize dual citizenship until 1998. Therefore, during the years of the Korean War, those who were born in the United States to a Mexican father or mother, had to renounce to their US nationality if they wanted to maintain their Mexican nationality. They had to decide when they reached the age of majority, which at that time was 21 years old. This means that all those who were enlisted in the army before that age had not yet decided their final nationality. Young people of Mexican origin born in the United States had the possibility of crossing the border to Mexico to evade the obligation to fulfill their mandatory military service and serve in the Korean War. However, the vast majority chose to stay, as war veteran Raúl R. Morin points out: "even with the constant discrimination and continued denial of equal opportunities, when war came to the United States, no one could accuse us of draft dodging or fleeing to Mexico to avoid military service as charged in World War I".

In the case of Mexicans born in Mexico and who were in the United States for any given reason, enlistment in the army was not mandatory. However, in the late 1940s and during the Korean War, various depositions indicate that some Mexican nationals were forced to enlist. The Genaro Estrada Historical Archive of the Secretariat of Foreign Affairs keeps various files that report protests by Mexican consuls for arbitrary detentions of nationals. These reports include those of workers under the Bracero Program, who managed to communicate with the nearest consulate before being forced join the army.

Many Mexicans also voluntarily enlisted in the United States Army at the end of their employment contract, to maintain an income and not returning to Mexico, where job opportunities were uncertain. Most of the volunteers enlisted with the hope of obtaining the US citizenship at the end of their three-year military conscription, including those who had entered the United States without legal paperwork. At that time, granting the nationality to foreigners who concluded their military service with honor was almost automatic.

Other motivations of a psychological nature have been registered. José Villarreal, from Tlalnepantla de Baz, Mexico, narrates in his unpublished memoirs that he decided to cross to the United States and enlist in the army "to return as a hero" in the eyes of his family and friends who were living in Mexico City at the time. When he enlisted, Villarreal spoke rudimentary English and, during his training in California, had to take English language courses with other Mexican, Puerto Rican, and Native American soldiers. On the other hand, César Augusto Borja Ochoa mentions that his enlistment in the army was a way of rebuilding the damaged relationship he had with his father, wanting to show him that he could be "a good man".

== Mexicans and Mexican Americans in the Korean War ==
During the Korean War, soldiers of Mexican origin fought on multiple fronts. The existence of a Mexican squad and some of the first records of casualties and prisoners are highlighted below:

=== The Mexican Squad ===
According to the memoirs of Corporal Jesús Rodríguez, from Los Angeles, California, there was a squad made up exclusively of Mexicans and Mexican Americans during the Korean War. He narrates that this Mexican squad, under the command of Sergeant Baker, "was moving and doing it right. Sergeant Baker changed his colors and he really liked having the Mexican squad because they followed orders and they moved out when ordered." This squad was part of Company "A" of the Combat Team of the 35th Regiment of the 25th Division. This was possible because during that time, the United States Army used to group soldiers by "race" or national origin. It is estimated that there must have been more squads or platoons like the one described in the memoirs of Corporal Rodriguez due to the high number of Mexican and Mexican origin soldiers in the army. José Villarreal's documents confirm Rodríguez's observation since they contain two photographs of a unit made up of Mexicans before their enlistment and in their civilian clothes, and another of the same group in formation and with their military uniform.

=== First Casualties and Prisoners ===
Just three days after the start of the conflict, on June 28, 1950, a reconnaissance plane of the US forces that had taken off from Japan flew over the Korean peninsula and crashed in the Yellow Sea due to an engine failure. Sergeant Joe Campos, a Mexican American from Miami, Arizona, was in it. His body was collected almost three years later. It was one of the first foreign casualties of the War.

A few days later, the first encounter between US and North Korean troops took place in Osan-ni, known as the "Battle of Osan". The first combat casualties happened there, as well as the first captures of prisoners of war, who would return to their places of origin more than three years later. Florentino Gonzales, from Chicago, Illinois, son of Mexicans, was in that group of soldiers who suffered the prison camps of North Korea.

== Renown Veterans ==
=== Recognition from the US Government ===
Some Mexican and Mexican American soldiers have been recognized for their work and performance during the Korean War. They received some of the highest decorations from the United States government. Among the decorations received, fifteen Congressional Medals of Honor were awarded to Hispanics, ten of them to Mexican Americans, and five Crosses of Naval Merit. It is estimated that the Distinguished Service Cross was awarded to 37 Hispanics and the Silver Star to about 498 Hispanic soldiers.

A school in the state of California and a ship of the US Navy bear the name of Medal of Honor winner Eugene Obregon, who sacrificed his life to save that of his companions on September 26, 1950 during the assault on the city of Seoul. In addition, Richard Edward Cavazos fought in Korea as a lieutenant and decades later became the first four-star general of Mexican origin in the United States Army.

US President Lyndon B. Johnson recognized Mexican-American soldiers in the foreword to Raul Morin's book Among the Valiant (he was Vice President at the time): "the American soldiers of Mexican origin served with distinction. They fought courageously. They gave their lives, when need be, valiantly. [...] Evidence of their valor and their patriotic devotion to duty is contained in the official records of many combat units and in the distinguished roll of winner of the Congressional Medal of Honor".

=== Recognition from the Republic of Korea ===
The South Korean government has also recognized these soldiers and given decorations to some of them. In July 2020, the Embassy of Korea in Mexico launched the campaign "Search for Mexican Veterans of the Korean War" through the media. In October 2020, the Vice Minister of Foreign Affairs of South Korea, Kim Gunn, visited the Mexican veteran José Villareal at his home and presented him with the Apostle of Peace Medal from the Ministry of Patriots and Veterans Affairs. The Korean Military Attaché in Mexico, Kim Yoon Joo, also presented the Apostle of Peace Medal to veteran Jesús Cantú Salinas at his home in Monterrey, Nuevo León, on April 21, 2021. The Korean government is expected to deliver more of these medals to Mexican veterans who are alive or to their families.

On July 27, 2024, Prime Minister Han Duck Soo bestowed the Chungmu Order of Military Merit upon Veteran Alberto Jesús Fernández Almada, on behalf of President Yoon Suk-yeol, in Seoul.

On June 28, 2022, the Korean Minister of Patriots and Veterans, Park Minshik, inaugurated the exhibition "Mexicans and Mexican Americans: The Forgotten Soldiers of the Korean War" at the Korean War Memorial Museum, with the presence of veterans Roberto Sierra Barbosa, Alberto Jesús Fernández Almada and Antonio Lozano Bustos. In his speech, he mentioned that this is the first time that Mexican veterans have been invited to Korea since the war and emphasized that "In the future, I would like to invite at least one more UN veteran, including Mexican veterans, to express my gratitude and pass on that noble love for humanity to future generations, I will do my best."

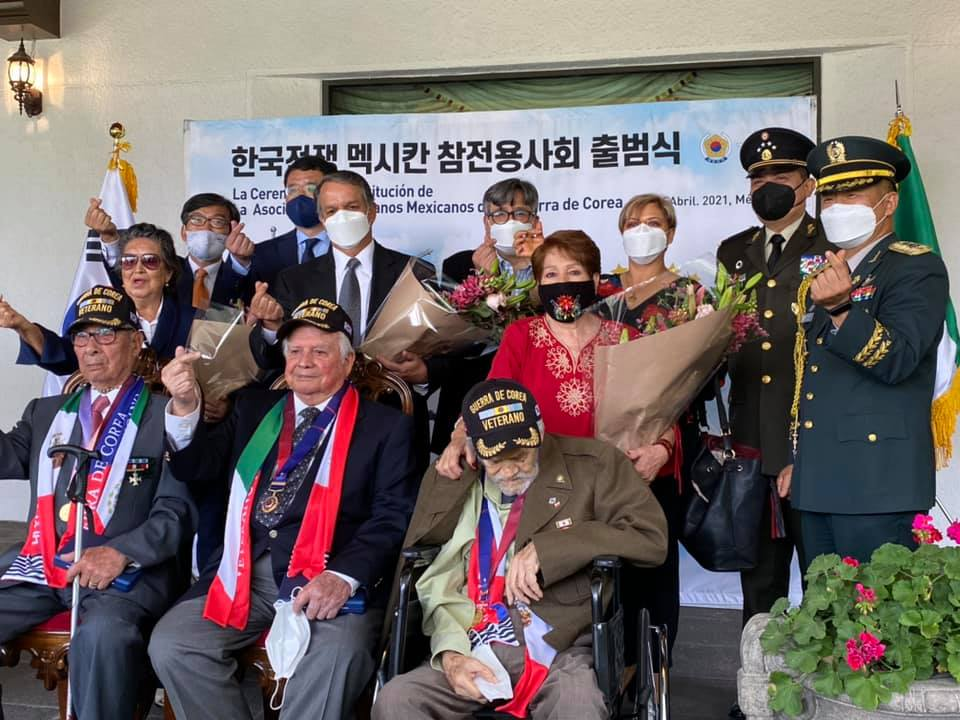
Ceremony for the establishment of the Mexican Association of Veterans of the Korean War, April 2021. This Association seeks to recognize the Mexican soldiers who fought in this conflict under the command of the US Army.

== Establishment of the First Mexican Association of Veterans of the Korean War ==
On April 24, 2021, the Association of Mexican Veterans of the Korean War was established at the residence of the Ambassador of the Republic of Korea in Mexico. Three veterans attended the event: Roberto Sierra Barbosa (Zapopan, Jalisco), José Villarreal Villarreal (Tlalnepantla de Baz, State of Mexico) and Alberto Fernández Almada (Ciudad Obregón, Sonora), while veteran Jesús Cantú Salinas, from Monterrey, Nuevo León, participated through videoconference. Secretary of National Defense of Mexico, General Luis Cresencio Sandoval González, the First Vice Minister of Foreign Affairs of the Republic of Korea, Choe Jong-kun and Korean Ambassador to Mexico Suh Jeong-in were witnesses of honor. Family members of five deceased veterans also participated in the event. Furthermore, the Korean Ministry of Patriot and Veteran Affairs donated masks against COVID-19 to celebrate the constitution of aforementioned association.

The first president of the association, José Villarreal Villarreal, died on May 1, 2021.

== The Korean War in Mexican cinematography ==
The Korean War left a mark on Mexican society in the 1950s. Three movies from that decade mention the war from different perspectives.

"En la palma de tu mano", (In the Palm of Your Hand) directed in 1950 by Roberto Gavaldón and released in 1951, mentions the loss of a son in the war. In one of the scenes in the film, Mrs. Carmelita (Enriqueta Reza), who is illiterate, asks Professor Jaime Karín (Arturo de Córdova) to read her a letter that she received from her son. In it, "the Secretary of the Army" informs that her son, Private First-Class Arturo García Luna, "was killed in combat in Incheon, Korea." Professor Karín lies so as not to make her suffer and tells her that they have changed her son's regiment and that he is very far away, "in the most beautiful place he has ever known", but that he cannot say where because "his superiors do not allow it".

"En la palma de tu mano" was awarded in 1952 with the Ariel Award by the Mexican Academy of Cinematographic Arts and Sciences for Best Film, Direction, Actor, Photography, Original Storyline, Editing, Production Design and Sound.

The movie "¡Ay amor... cómo me has puesto!" (Oh Darling! Look What You've Done To Me!) directed by Gilberto Martínez Solares in 1951, deals with the issue of war in a comical way. After suffering a heart break, the actor Tin Tan (Germán Valdés) shouts to his friends: "What I'm going to do, is go to the Korean War!" After admiring his bravery, they all decide to accompany him to what turns out to be a cabaret with that name.

"¡Me gustan valentones!" (I Like Them Brave!) directed by Julián Soler (1959), deals with the theme of courage as an essential value of masculinity in the Mexican countryside. José González (Luis Aguilar) is a Mexican resident of the United States who marries by "power of attorney" a ranchera, Chela (Rosita Quintana), who hopes to receive a "very macho" husband. When José arrives at San Valentín de la Sierra, Chela is disappointed because her husband does not respond to the taunts and provocations of the town men. In the climax of the film she explodes, reproaching him that he is a coward and a "little man". José opens in front of her a small coffer of his property and spills out photographs, press clippings in English and medals. He responds to her that he was in the Korean War, that he was "a poor sergeant of Mexican origin who deserved the Congressional [United States] Medal for ... his cowardice!", that he used "all weapons invented by men", and his hands "have killed thousands of men". Ever since, he vowed to never fight again and had gone in search of the peace "which men apparently despise". Immediately afterwards he leaves the ranch, goes to the town, and beats those who had wronged him.

== The Korean War in Mexican Painting, Literature and Music ==
Diego Rivera, one of the most renowned Mexican artists of the first half of the 20th century, alludes to the Korean War in the mural Nightmare of war and dream of peace. This work was executed between 1951 and 1952 and has 19 meters long and 5 high. It includes among others a North Korean soldier allegedly crucified by South Korean forces in Tchdonindo; an atomic bomb; the leaders of the Soviet Union, Joseph Stalin, and of the People's Republic of China, Mao Zedong, offering a dove of peace to impersonations of the United States, United Kingdom, and France. In another space on the canvas, Frida Kahlo, wife of Diego Rivera, in a wheelchair, collects signatures in support of the call for peace and for the prohibition of the atomic bomb launched from Stockholm in April 1950 by the Permanent Committee of Supporters of the Peace. This Mural, commissioned by the Mexican government to tour several European countries, was not accepted due to its political content, so it was sold or given by the painter to the People's Republic of China and then disappeared. Currently, only photographs taken during the production process or sketches on paper survive.

The prominent Mexican writer José Revueltas published the short novel "Los motivos de Caín", (Cain's Motives) in 1957. He was also co-writer of the film En la palma de tu mano. The novel is a tragic allegory of humanity in the middle of the 20th century, focused on the theme of fratricide, with an explicit biblical reference in the title to the story of the brothers Cain and Abel. Through the main character, the Mexican-American and army deserter Jack Mendoza, the novel deals with the two Koreas at war, the incident known as the Zoot Suit Riots that opposed Anglo-American and Mexican-American soldiers in Los Angeles, California, and finally Jack Mendonza's surprising encounter on a Korean battlefield with North Korean soldier Kim, born in Mexico to a Korean father and a Mexican mother.

The Korean War was also present in the Mexican music of the 50s. The famous trio "Los tres Caballeros" recorded in 1953, under the RCA Victor label, "Carta de Corea", in which a Mexican soldier writes to his mother that he is badly wounded and asks the Virgin to relieve him and grant him back to this side. Humorously in "Vamos a Corea", the group Los Xochimilcas only repeats, at the end of the musical piece with Boogie-woogie rhythm: "let's go to Korea, I don't know why they fight".

The Texas composer Daniel Garcés and his group "Los Tres Reyes" (not to be confused with the famous trio of the same name, founded by the Puente brothers in Mexico) recorded "Voy pa' Corea" (I'm going to Korea) under the Wolf Recordings brand, where he sings "I'm going to war because the government calls me" and adds: "I'm going to teach them that a Latin American never gives up, neither in his own land nor in a foreign one". Other musical pieces from both Mexico and the southern United States refer to the same theme: the polka "Recuerdos de Corea" (Memories from Korea) by Conjunto Arizmendez; "I'm leaving for Korea", by the Imperial Trio; "A letter to Korea", by the Alamo Complex in San Antonio, Texas.

== See also ==
- Mexico–South Korea relations
- South Korea–United States relations
