= Mexico–South Korea relations =

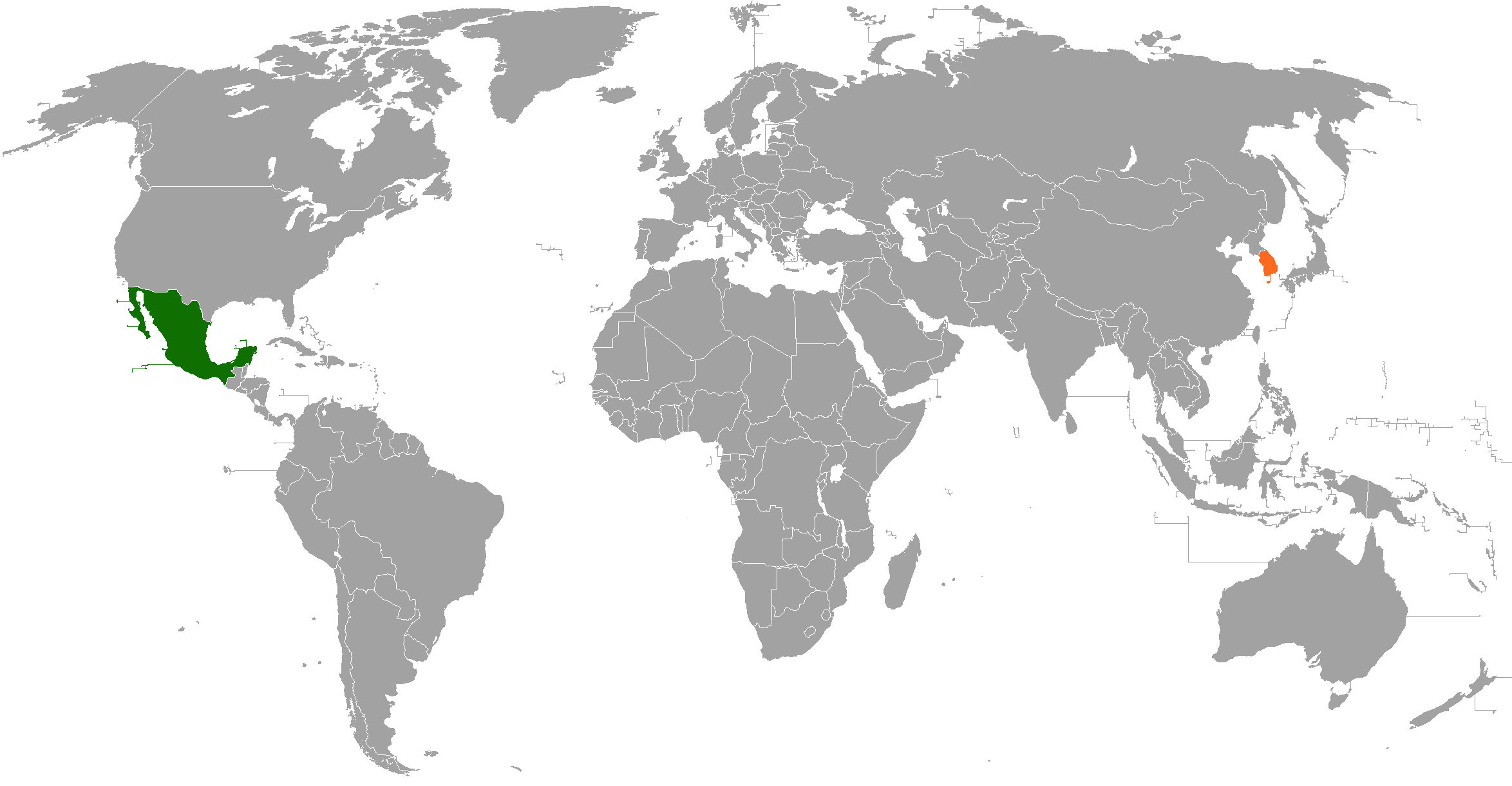

- Mexico: South Korea

The nations of Mexico and South Korea established diplomatic relations in 1962. Both nations are members of the Asia-Pacific Economic Cooperation, Forum of East Asia–Latin America Cooperation, G-20 major economies, Organisation for Economic Co-operation and Development and the United Nations.

== History ==
The first contact between the peninsula of Korea and Mexico took place when Spanish born and Mexican born Jesuits from New Spain (modern-day Mexico) arrived to Korea to preach Christianity. Since initial contacts, there would be almost no further direct contact between the two nations and any contact at all would have been done with Korean trading ships coming to Manila (capital of the Spanish crown in the Philippines) and their goods and merchandise traveling by Spanish galleons to present day Mexico. In 1905, a Korean ship called the Ilford arrived in southern Mexico carrying approximately 1,033 Korean migrants. These migrants eventually settled in the Mexican state of Yucatán.

During the Korean War, unlike several Latin American nations, Mexico decided to remain neutral and not send troops to the Korean peninsula, however, approximately 100,000 Mexicans (and of Mexican descent) did fight in Korea under the command the United States Armed Forces as well as under the United Nations flag.

On 26 January 1962, Mexico and South Korea formally established diplomatic relations. That same year, South Korea opened an embassy in Mexico City. Initially, Mexico conducted relations with South Korea from its embassy in Tokyo, Japan. In March 1968, South Korea dedicated a Friendship Pavilion to Mexico and placed it in Chapultepec Park. In 1978, Mexico opened an embassy in Seoul.

In 1991, South Korean President Roh Tae-woo became the first South Korean head of state to visit Mexico and Latin-America. In 1996, Mexican President Ernesto Zedillo reciprocated the visit to South Korea. Since then, there have been several high level visits between the two nations.

In 2017, both nations celebrated 112 years since the first Korean migration to Mexico. In 2021, the Mexican Government created the Establishment of the Association of Mexican Veterans of the Korean War.

In 2022, both nations celebrated 60 years of diplomatic relations. In July of that same year, Mexican Foreign Secretary Marcelo Ebrard paid a visit to South Korea to continue the conversations for a free trade agreement between both nations that were initiated in 2012.

In August 2026, Mexican Foreign Secretary Roberto Velasco Álvarez paid a visit to South Korea and met with his counterpart Cho Hyun. In September 2026, South Korean President Lee Jae Myung paid a State visit to Mexico. During the visit, President Lee met with President Claudia Sheinbaum and the two leaders signed 17 bilateral agreements including agreements on minerals, AI, defense and space.

== High-level visits ==
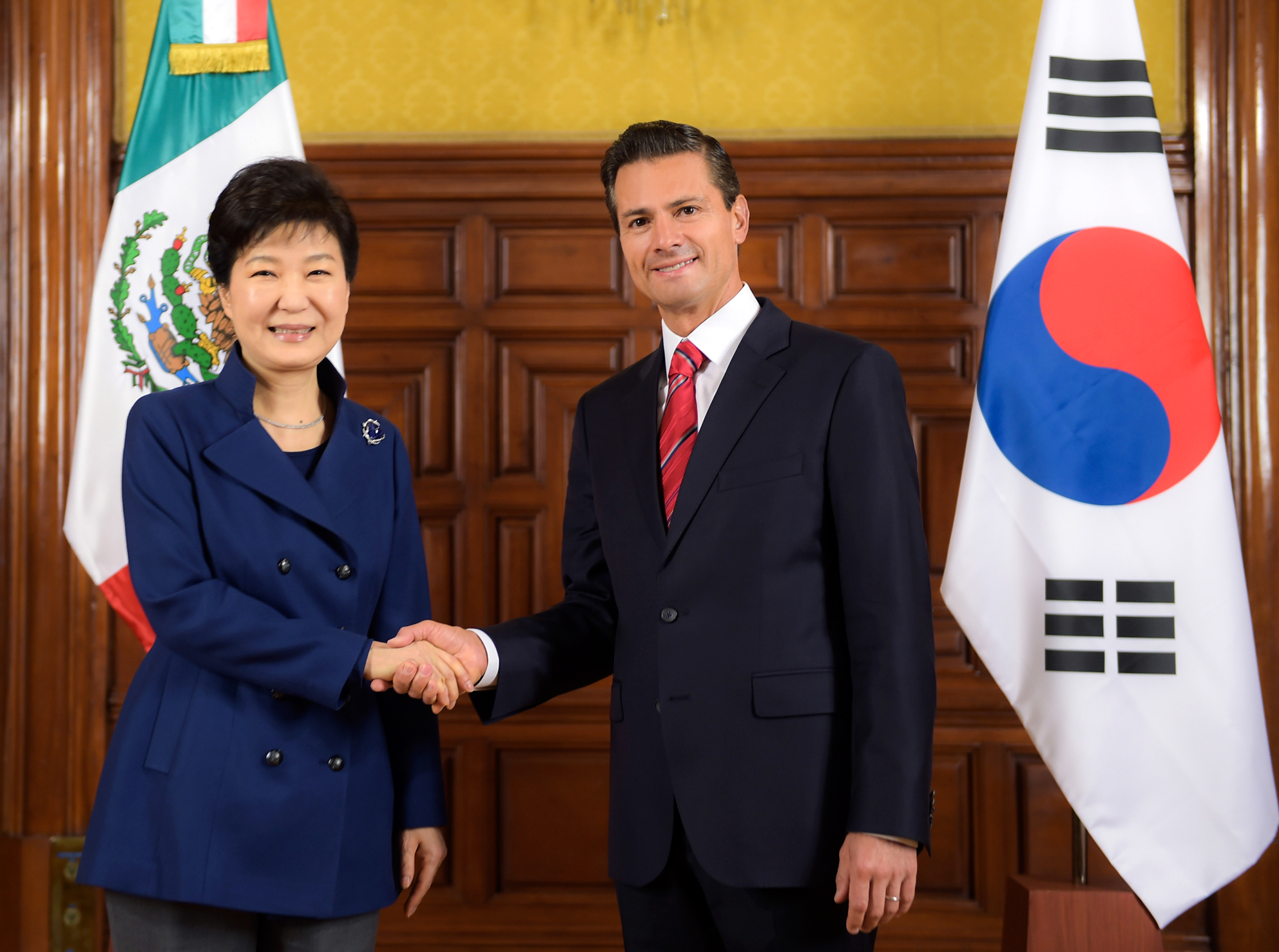
Mexican President Enrique Peña Nieto and South Korean President Park Geun-hye in Mexico City, 2016.

High-level visits from Mexico to South Korea

- President Ernesto Zedillo (1996)
- President Vicente Fox (2001, 2005)
- President Felipe Calderón (2010)
- Foreign Secretary Marcelo Ebrard (2022)
- Foreign Undersecretary Carmen Moreno Toscano (2022)
- Secretary of the Economy Marcelo Ebrard (2025)
- Foreign Secretary Roberto Velasco Álvarez (2026)

High-level visits from South Korea to Mexico

- Foreign Minister Pak Tongjin (1977)
- President Roh Tae-woo (1991)
- President Kim Young-sam (1997)
- President Kim Dae-jung (2002)
- President Roh Moo-hyun (2005)
- President Lee Myung-bak (2010, 2012)
- President Park Geun-hye (2016)
- President Lee Jae Myung (2026)

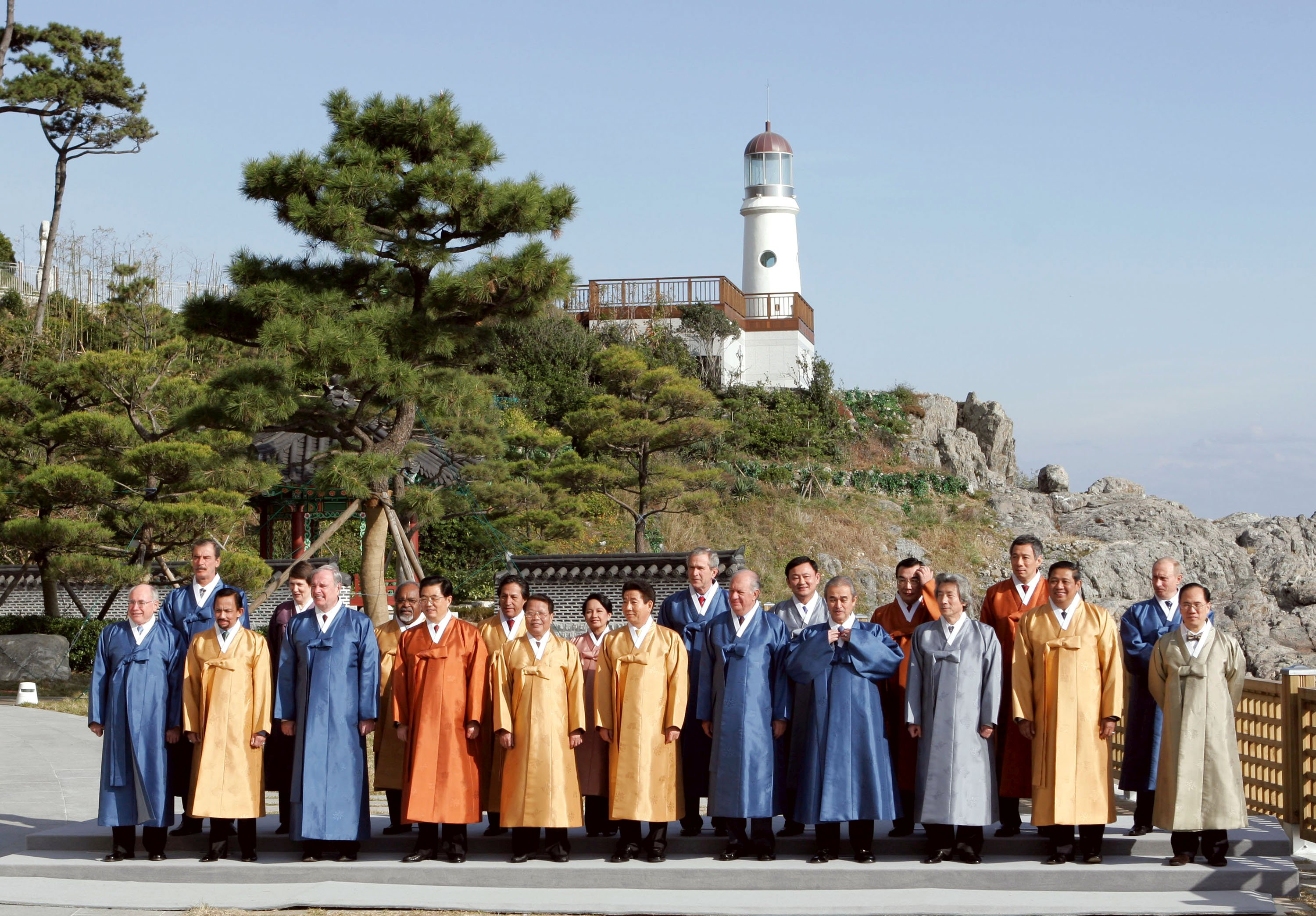
President Roh Moo-hyun and President Vicente Fox in Busan; November 2005.

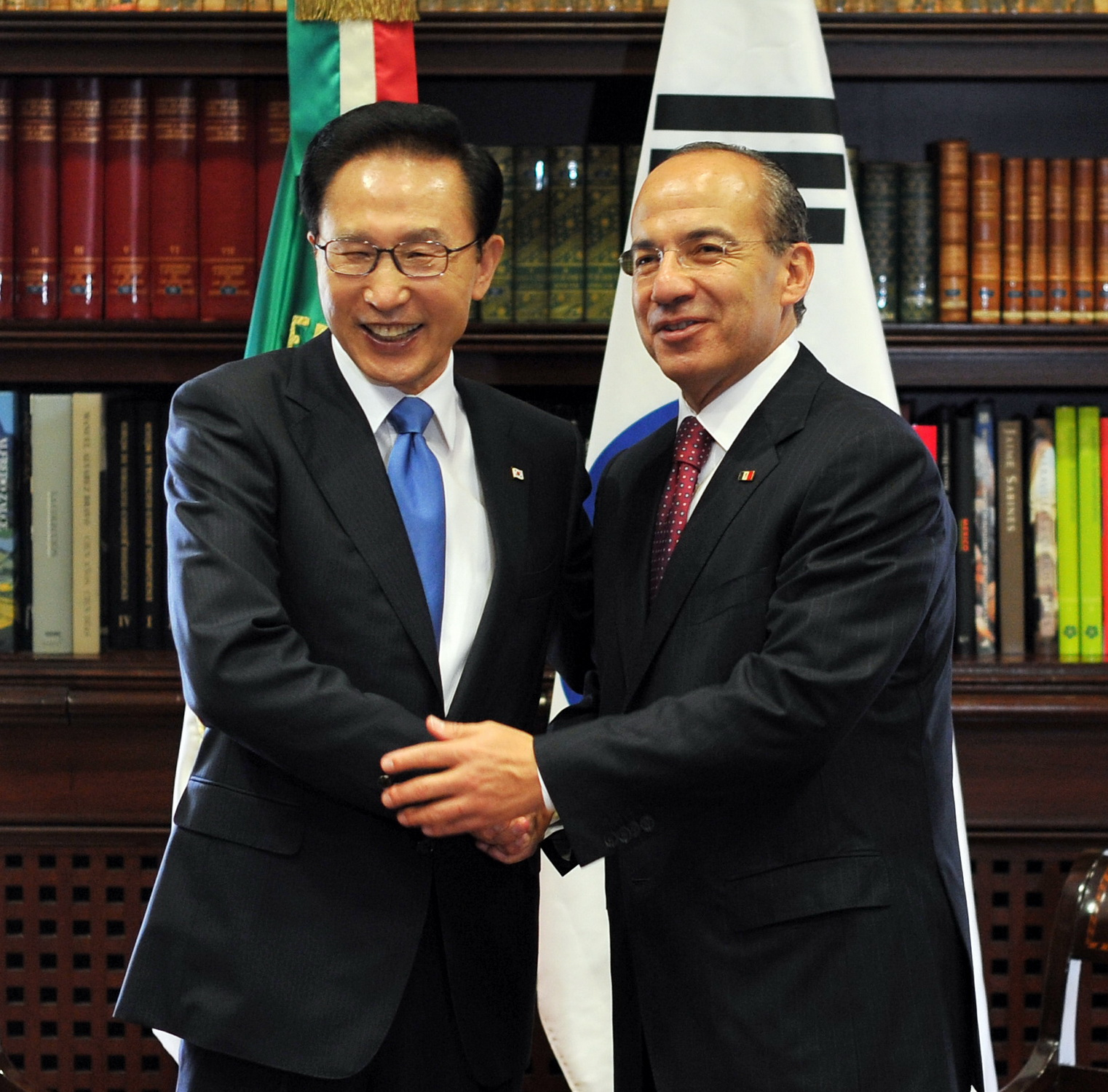
President Felipe Calderón with President Lee Myung-bak in Mexico City; July 2010.

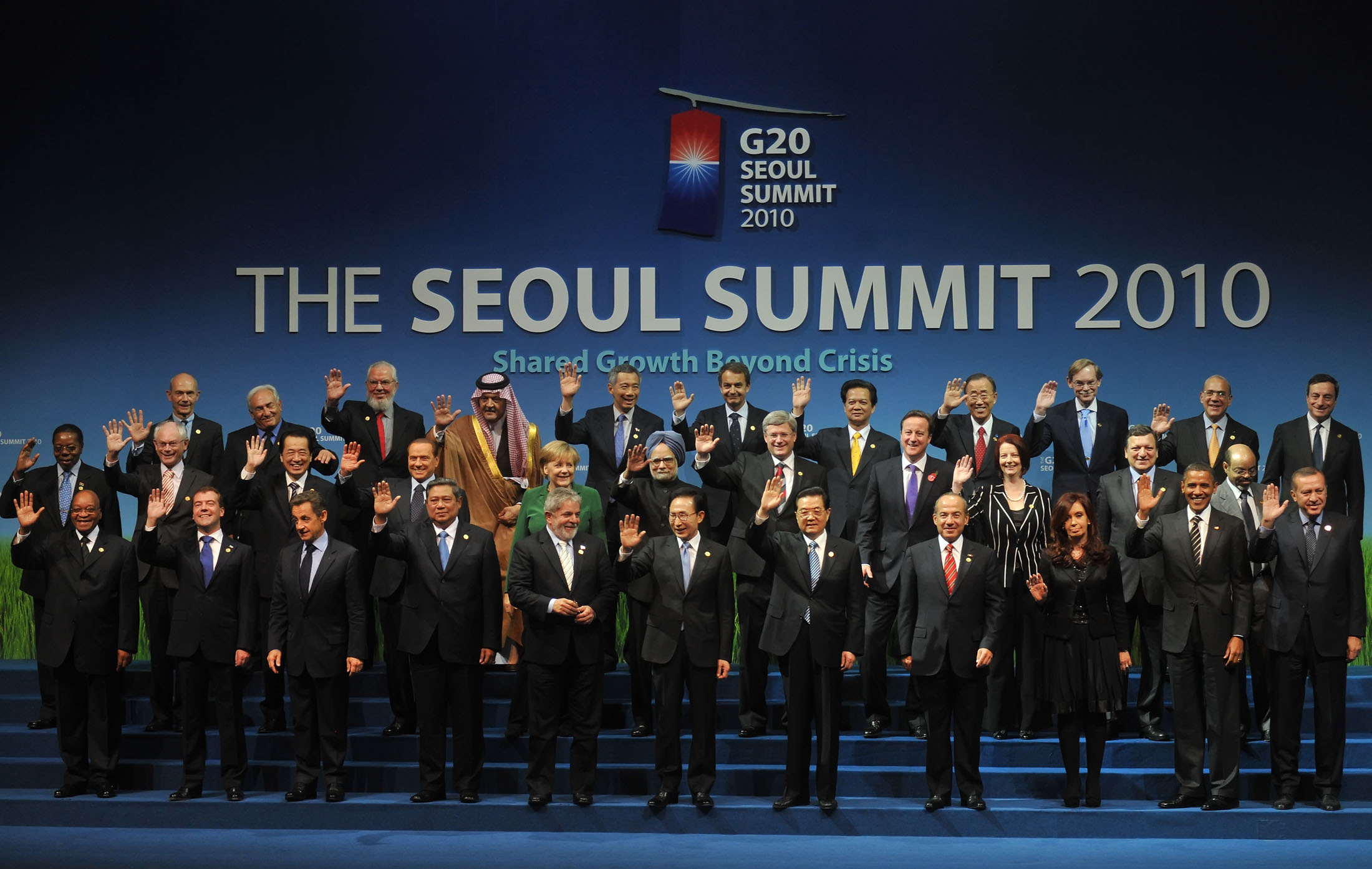
President Lee Myung-bak and President Felipe Calderón in Seoul; November 2010.

== Bilateral agreements ==
Both nations have signed several bilateral agreements such as an Agreement on Cultural Cooperation (1966); Agreement on Trade (1966); Agreement on Air Transportation (1988); Agreement on Economic, Scientific and Technical Cooperation (1989); Agreement to Avoid Double Taxation and Prevent Fiscal Evasion with respect to Income Taxes (1994); Extradition Treaty (1996); Agreement on Tourism Cooperation (1996); Agreement on the Promotion and Reciprocal Protection of Investments (2000); Agreement on Mutual Legal Assistance in Criminal Matters (2005); Agreement on Cooperation and Mutual Assistance in Customs Matters (2005) and an Agreement for Cooperation in the Peaceful Uses of Nuclear Energy (2012).

== Tourism and transportation ==
In 2018, 130,000 South Korean citizens visited Mexico for tourism. In 2017, over 8,000 Mexican citizens visited South Korea for tourism. There are direct flights between both nations with Aeroméxico.

== Trade ==
In 2012, Mexico and South Korea began negotiations on a free trade agreement. In 2023, trade between the two nations amounted to US$23.2 billion. Mexico's main exports to South Korea include: piston and rotary engines, parts and accessories of motor vehicles, aluminum, rubber and tires, chemical based products, fruits and vegetables, meat, and alcohol. South Korea's main exports to Mexico include: machinery, electronic equipment, cars, parts and accessories for motor vehicles, video games and consoles, iron and steel, chemical based products, and food based products.

South Korea is Mexico's sixth biggest trading partner globally and South Korean foreign direct investment in Mexico between 1999 and 2023 amounted to over US$10.5 billion. There are 2,032 South Korean companies investing in Mexico. Several South Korean multinational companies operating in Mexico include: LG, Hyundai, KEPCO, Kia Motors, KOGAS, Posco and Samsung (among others). Mexican multinational companies such as Grupo Bimbo, Grupo Promax, Katcon, KidZania and Vitro (among others) operate in South Korea.

== Resident diplomatic missions ==
- Mexico has an embassy in Seoul.
- South Korea has an embassy in Mexico City.
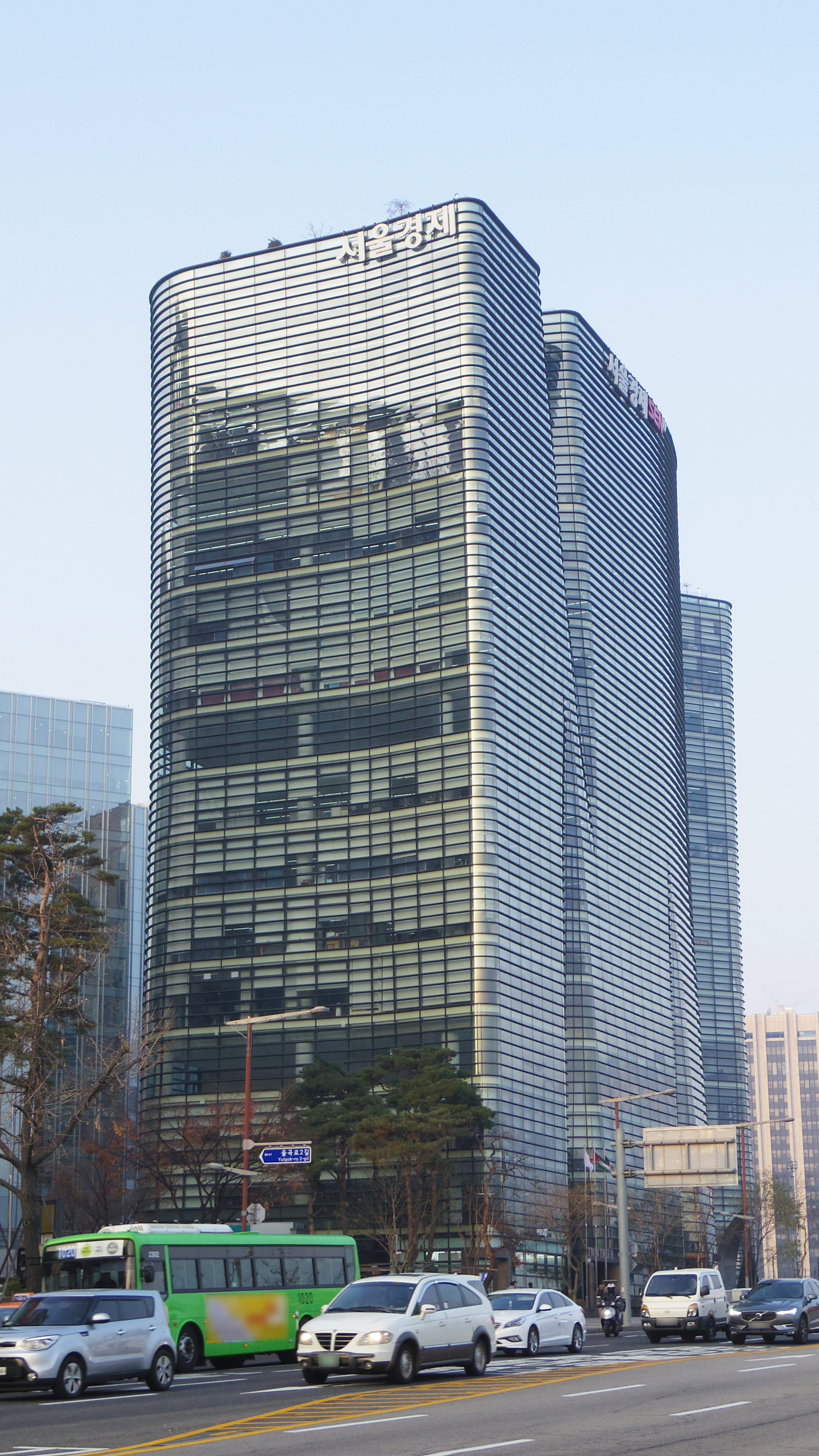
Building hosting the Embassy of Mexico in Seoul

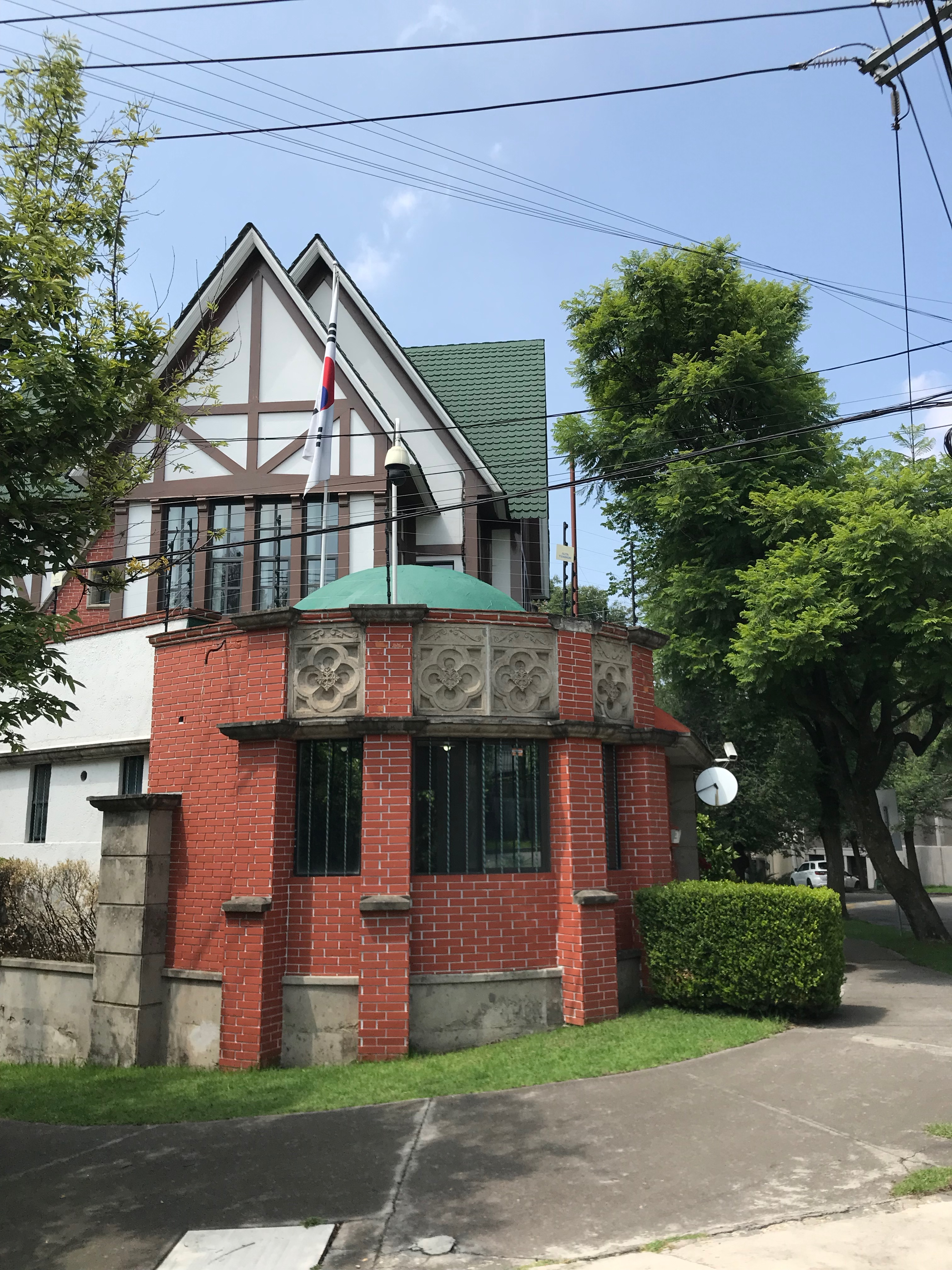
Embassy of South Korea in Mexico City

== Gallery ==
Korean Pavilion in Chapultepec Park in Mexico City

Monument commemorating the centennial of Korean migration to Mexico in Mérida, Mexico

Korean Cultural Center in Mexico City

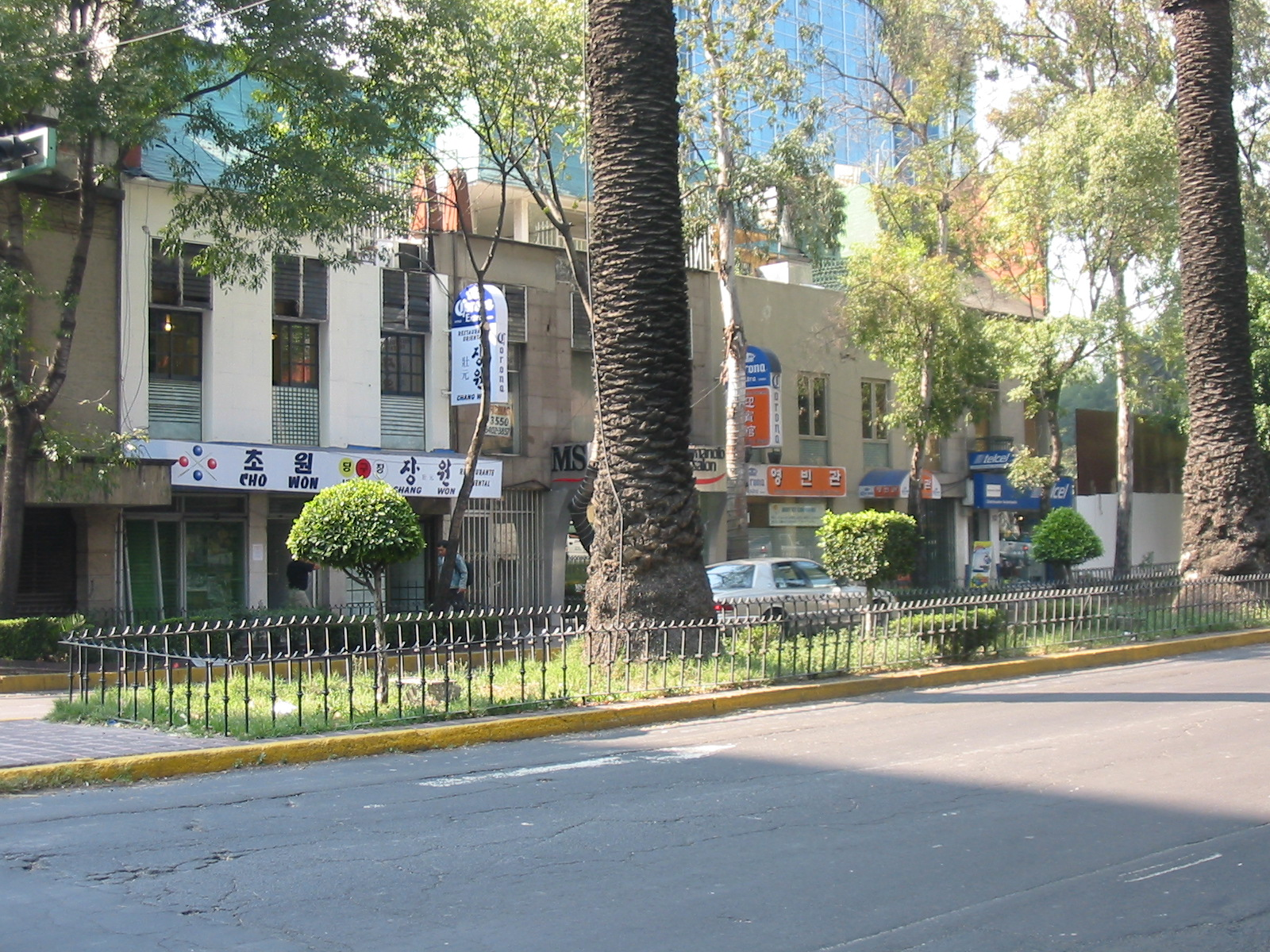
Korean restaurants in Mexico City

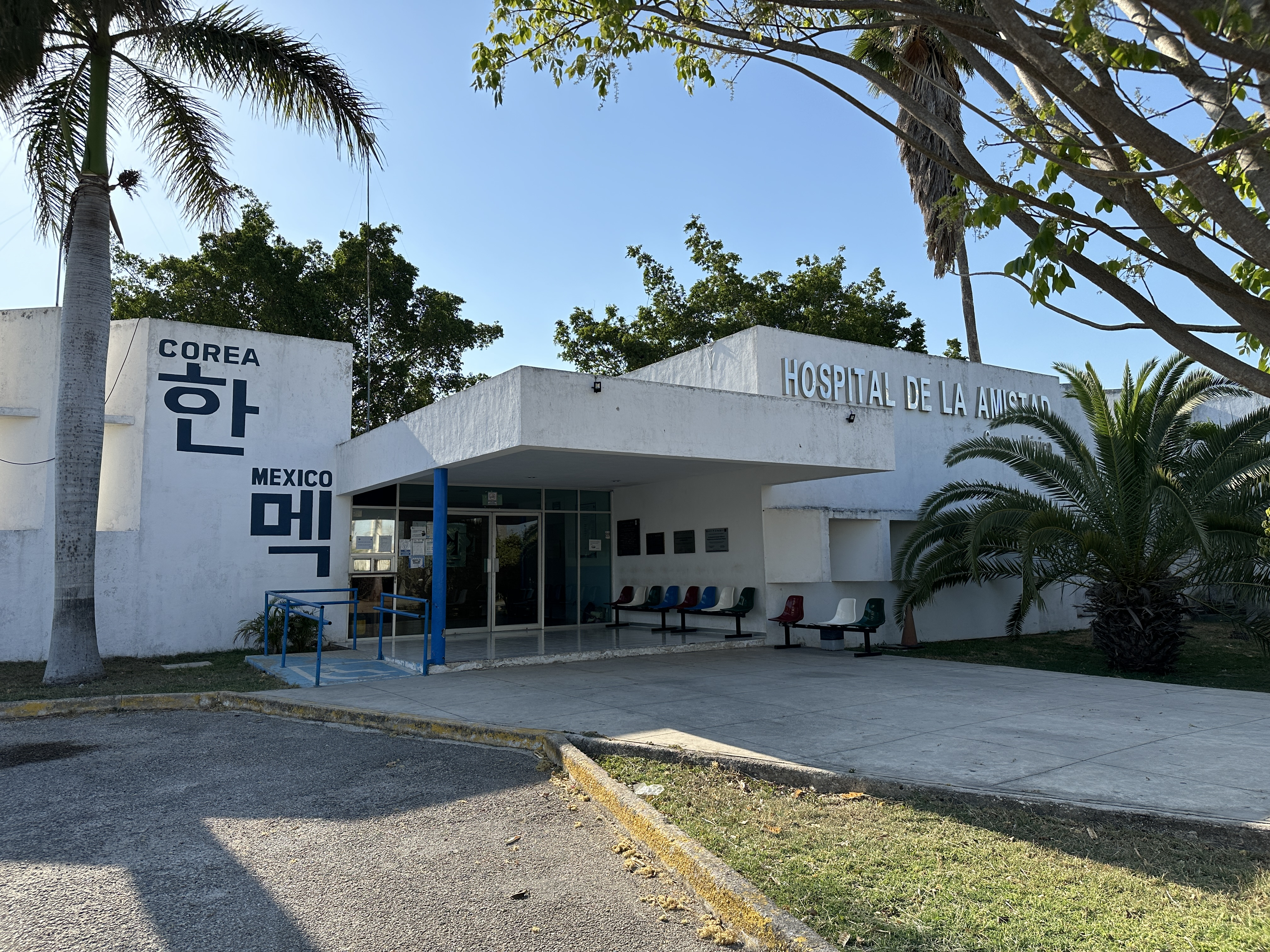
Korea–Mexico Friendship Hospital in Mérida, Mexico

Mexican President Claudia Sheinbaum with Korean band BTS at the National Palace in Mexico City

== See also ==
- Koreans in Mexico
- Korean Cultural Center, Mexico City
- Mexicans and Mexican Americans in the Korean War
- Pequeño Seúl
