= Elda Peralta =

Mexican actress (1932–2024)

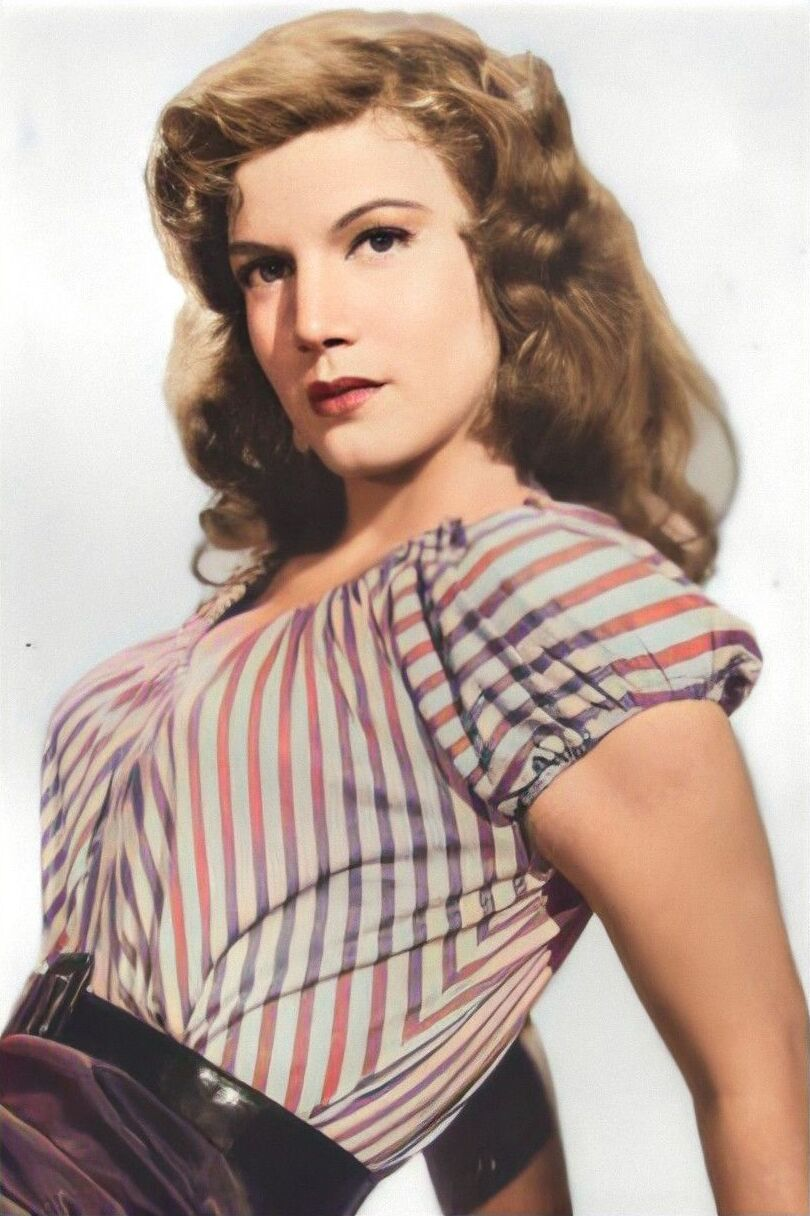
- Peralta, c. 1960s
- Born: 28 July 1932; Hermosillo, Sonora, Mexico
- Died: May 2024 (aged 91); Mexico City, Mexico, Mexico
- Occupation: Actress
- Years active: 1947–2002

Elda Peralta Ayala (28 July 1932 – May 2024) was a Mexican actress and writer.

Her death at the age of 91 was confirmed by National Association of Actors on 15 May 2024.

== Selected filmography ==
- Hypocrite (1949)
- Black Angustias (1950)
- Immaculate (1950)
- The Cry of the Flesh (1951)
- Women's Prison (1951)
- Beauty Salon (1951)
- Streetwalker (1951)
- Crime and Punishment (1951)
- The Minister's Daughter (1952)
- A Woman Without Love (1952)
- My Darling Clementine (1953)
- Remember to Live (1953)
