= Matilde Landeta =

Mexican filmmaker (1913–1999)

- Born: 20 September 1913; Mexico City, Mexico
- Died: 26 January 1999 (aged 85)
- Occupations: Filmmaker, screenwriter

Matilde Soto Landeta (20 September 1913 – 26 January 1999) was a Mexican filmmaker and screenwriter, the first woman to serve in those roles during the Golden Age of Mexican cinema (1936-1956). Her films focused on the portrayal of strong, realistic female protagonists in a patriarchal world.

== Early life ==
Landeta was born on 20 September 1913 in Mexico City (Note: Some sources give her birth date as 20 September 1910.) to a wealthy family, the daughter of Gregorio Soto Conde and Matilde Landeta Dávalos. After the death of her mother when she was three years of age, Landeta moved to San Luis, Potosí, where she was raised by her aunt and grandmother. She then moved back to Mexico City where she continued her studies in a monastery for Dominican mothers. Her love for film was born when she watched the film Old San Francisco during a trip to the United States.

Growing up in San Luis, she would play theater with her brother and friends, going so far as to hitting the other children if they didn't memorize their lines. Born with the soul of a director, she knew that once she embarked on her film making career, she would direct.

During the Mexican Revolution, when she was about six years old, she witnessed a group of women and children scavenging for rice that had fallen on its way to her grandmother's estate. Having seen this, Landeta begged for her grandmother to feed the poor some of their stored rice. This led her to realizing the social class differences in Mexico. This experience left a huge impression on her and grew up aligning herself, and her films, toward the "Left." Her goal was to show the poverty happening in her country.

== Career ==
In 1931, her brother, Eduardo Landeta, began his career as an actor when he got hired to play a secondary character in a film directed by Arcady Boytler. Matilde's love for film kept her coming back to visit her brother on set. During one of her visits, Miguel Zacarias offered her a job as a make-up artist. In 1932, Miguel decided to give Matilde a chance as script supervisor. Due to her gender, she had to prove that she was capable of doing the job when applying for the position of assistant director. She was forced to reach out to the Sindicato de Trabajadores de la Produccion Cinematografica in order to get the job.

The struggle for Landeta to become a director was an arduous task that included union opposition and financial problems. At the time, women were rarely allowed to work in departments outside of makeup or wardrobe, but she had an edge that allowed her to become a script supervisor- she could speak English. In 1945 she became an assistant director and worked with some of the best directors of the time. These included Emilio Fernández, Julio Bracho, and Roberto Gavaldón. Her exclusive contract with Films Mundiales during Mexico's Golden Age of Cinema allowed her to learn all aspects of film making by working on some of the most well known films of the time.

Directing demanded a sense of authority, according to Landeta, so she believed the natural progression toward directing was to become an assistant director. In order to do this, she had to confront the union of assistant directors who argued that being an assistant director was no job for a woman. She sought to find a legitimate reason stating her inability to become an assistant director, so she approached the Secretary of Labor. She was never given a reason why she couldn't become an A.D. Using her tremendous sense of humor, Landeta dressed as a man, going so far as to wear a fake mustache to the set of La Guerra de los Pasteles. Upon arriving on set, Landeta began shouting "SILENCE," just as an assistant director would do before beginning a new take. The decision was made before a general meeting of the union that Landeta could be put to the task of becoming an assistant director, a position she held between 1945 and 1947. From there, she began her plans to move toward becoming a Director. However, despite working in the industry for many years, she received no support. Production companies refused to finance her films, and the labor union refused to back her as well.

Landeta's first full feature, Lola Casanova (1948), based on the anthropological novel by Rojas González was set to cost 16,000 pesos. Since she could find no financial support, she alongside her brother and González, began the production company TACMA S.A. De C.V. Landeta and her brother sold their cars, asked family for help and Landeta even mortgaged her house. Landeta chose Lola Casanova as the topic for her directorial debut because she felt strongly about what the story represented. It dealt with the lives and customs of indigenous Mexicans and a strong willed woman's effort to mediate their transition into society. However, distribution companies boycotted her film, once she was done shooting it. An entire roll of filmed negatives were lost by the studio and Landeta was forced to wait for the release her film over a year after it was completed. Even then, the studio premiered her film as a B-movie on a Tuesday during Semana Santa.

Her second feature film, La Negra Angustias, was not only boycotted like her first film, but also received very harsh criticism from her colleagues in the industry. From here on out, her name and reputation as a Director began to decline exponentially within the industry. Landeta was to direct Tribunal de Menores. However, when she asked Eduardo Garduaño, a member of the National Bank of Cinematography for help, he convinced Landeta to sell her screenplay She took his advice sold the film to director Alfonso Corona Blake who renamed the film El camino de la vida. They tried to exclude her name from the credits but she ended proceeded to sue them and maintained recognition for her screenplay. However, due to this incident, the National Bank of Cinematography stopped supporting her. Due to her current position, Landeta suffered from a shortage of talent crew and money, which made it nearly impossible for her to continue her work.

In her third film, Trotacalles Landeta deals with the topic of infidelity. Here, a rich banker named Faustino is cheated on by Elena. When asked why Faustino doesn't redeem the fallen Elena, Landeta responded with her trademark regard for feminine strength. "In general, in films made by men, the men redeem the women. They forgive their transgressions and move forward with them to the point they turn them into saints. I don’t believe this is true. Women redeem themselves when they want! There is no man that is capable of redeeming them. Instead of making a history of selfless women, I wanted to create a history of women who had done something in life. I wanted to make my films about women I know and feel are true."

Upon finishing her third film, Landeta decided to take a break from film making. She was hired by an American corporation to translate American television shorts into Spanish for syndication across Latin America. "At first, I was enthusiastic to take a break from all the fighting, get paid well for a while, and recuperate what I had invested [in my films]. I spent over a year making these half hour shorts for the Americans. They were these oddly named shorts called Howdy Doody (1953), a name that in Spanish mean absolutely nothing."

Matilde Landeta finished translating the shorts and decided to go back to film making. Unfortunately, she was barred from any attempt to make another film. It wasn't until 1991 that she made her final feature-length film Nocturno a Rosario (1991). Based on a poem by Manuel Acuña, Landeta modeled the film around Acuña's poem and a significant moment in Mexican history when Mexico was overtaken by French rule. "What interested me about this history was the manner in which the people were suffering at the hands of the intellectuals who brought this foreign rule."

== Personal life ==
Matilde grew up in a household that did not support her decision to become a filmmaker. This created a very strong conflict that damaged her family ties. During one of her interviews, however, she talks about how this was resolved one Christmas where she visited her family during the holidays.

In 1933, Landeta married a colonel from Sonora who went by the name of Martín Toscano Rodríguez. When Martín proposed, she made it clear that she had a commitment to her career as a filmmaker to which the colonel claimed to have no issues with. They got divorced 10 years later because Landeta expressed no wish to have a family with her husband. In one of her interviews she talks about an unplanned pregnancy which resulted in a sick baby who died after three days of giving birth. She said that she had no desire to be a mother.

== Awards and recognition ==
Landeta won an Ariel Award in 1957 for Best Original Story for the film El camino de la vida which she co-wrote with her brother Eduardo. The film also won the 1957 Golden Ariel, the Silver Ariel Film of Major National Interest and Best Direction and two other awards in 1956 in the Berlin International Film Festival under the name of Alfonso Corona Blake.

In 1975, Landeta was recognized for her film La negra Angustias in the Women Directors category for the International Women's Year. This was the first recognition she received including many others such as: the Italian Festival de Cine Femenino that paid homage to Landeta and showed her films in 1987; the Ariel Awards that gave her an honorary award for Lifetime Achievement in 1992 and many more between those years. Landeta also taught at the Instituto Cinematográfico, the first film school in Mexico; and she presided the Academy of Motion Picture Arts and Sciences of México twice.

1979: Special prize for Directing in Radio, Television and Film for meritorious service to the Mexican film industry. 1983–86: President of Awards Commission for the Academy of Motion Picture Arts and Sciences Mexico. 1986: Tribute; Kitchen of Images film festival, Mexico City; "Tribute to female pioneers of film' Havana Film Festival. 1987: Tribute; Feminist Film Review, Incontri Internazionale del Cinema, Sorrento, Italia. 1988: Tribute by Collective for Living Cinema, New York. 1989: Retrospective of Latin American Women Filmmakers, National Film Theater, London. Films des Femmes Festival, Créteil, France. 1989–1990: Included in the series " Révolte, Révolution, Cinéma" in the Centro Georges Pompidou, París; paid homage to on a variety of occasions throughout the 1990s.

In 2004, the Matilde Landeta Cultural Association was created to award screenwriters annual scholarships.

== Filmography ==
Her first and second feature films were adaptations of Francisco Rojas González's novel Lola Casanova (1948) and La Negra Angustias (1949). She also co-wrote and directed Trotacalles (1951)

Year	Film	Role
1933	El Compadre Mendoza	script supervisor
1933	El Prisionero Trece	script supervisor
1933	La Calandria	script supervisor
1933	Su Ultima Canción	script supervisor
1935	La Familia Dressel	script supervisor
1935	Vamonos Con Pancho Villa	script supervisor
1937	Aguila o Sol	script supervisor
1938	El Cobarde	script supervisor
1939	Con los Dorados de Villa	script supervisor
1940	Amor de los Amores	script supervisor
1942	Jesuita en Chihuahua	script supervisor
1942	Maria Eugenia	script supervisor
1943	Distinto Amanecer	script supervisor
1943	El as Negro	script supervisor and assistant director
1943	El Espectro de la Novia	script supervisor and assistant director
1943	Flor Silvestre	script supervisor
1943	La Corte del Faraón	script supervisor
1943	La Guerra de los Pasteles	script supervisor
1943	La Mujer sin Cabeza	script supervisor and assistant director
1943	Maria Candelaria	script supervisor
1944	Adan, Eva y el Diablo	assistant director
1945	Cantaclaro	script supervisor
1945	Espinas de una Flor	assistant director
1945	Flor de un Dia	assistant director
1945	Sinfonia de una Vida	script supervisor
1945	Soltera y con Gemelos	script supervisor
1946	Carita de Cielo	assistant director
1946	Don Simon de Lira	assistant director
1946	El Cocinero de mi Mujer	assistant director
1946	Extraña Obsecion	assistant director
1946	La Fuerza de la Sangre	assistant director
1946	La Herencia de la Llorona	assistant director
1946	Rocambole	assistant director
1946	Se Acabaron Las Mujeres	assistant director
1947	El Precio de la Gloria	assistant director
1947	La Mala Gueña	assistant director
1947	Pecadora	assistant director
1948	Ahi Vienen los Mendoza	assistant director
1948	Lola Casanova	writer, producer, director
1950	Black Angustias	writer, producer, director
1951	Trotacalles	writer, producer, director
1956	El camino de la vida	writer
1958	Siempre estaré contigo	writer
1976	Ronda Revolucionaria	writer
1986	Rescate de las islas Revillagigedo	writer, producer, director
1991	Nocturno a Rosario	writer, producer, director
