= Guillermo Calles =

Mexican film actor and director

- Born: 25 June 1893; Chihuahua, Mexico
- Died: 28 February 1958 (aged 64); Mexico City, Mexico
- Other name: Guillermo Calles Guerrero
- Occupations: Screenwriter, Director
- Years active: 1913 - 1958 (film)

Guillermo Calles (25 June 1893 – 28 February 1958) was a Mexican film actor, producer and director.

== Selected filmography ==
- Behind Two Guns (1924)
- Dios y Ley (1929)
- El vuelo de la muerte (1934)
- Such Is My Country (1937)
- Rosalinda (1945)
- The Shadow of the Bridge (1948)
- Lola Casanova (1949)
- The Woman I Lost (1949)
- The Magician (1949)
- The Torch (1950)
- Black Angustias (1950)
- Kill Me Because I'm Dying! (1951)
- Here Comes Martin Corona (1952)
- Tropical Delirium (1952)

== Bibliography ==
- Rogelio Agrasánchez. Guillermo Calles: A Biography of the Actor and Mexican Cinema Pioneer. McFarland, 2010.
