= Statue of Francisco Rojas González =

Statue in Guadalajara, Jalisco, Mexico

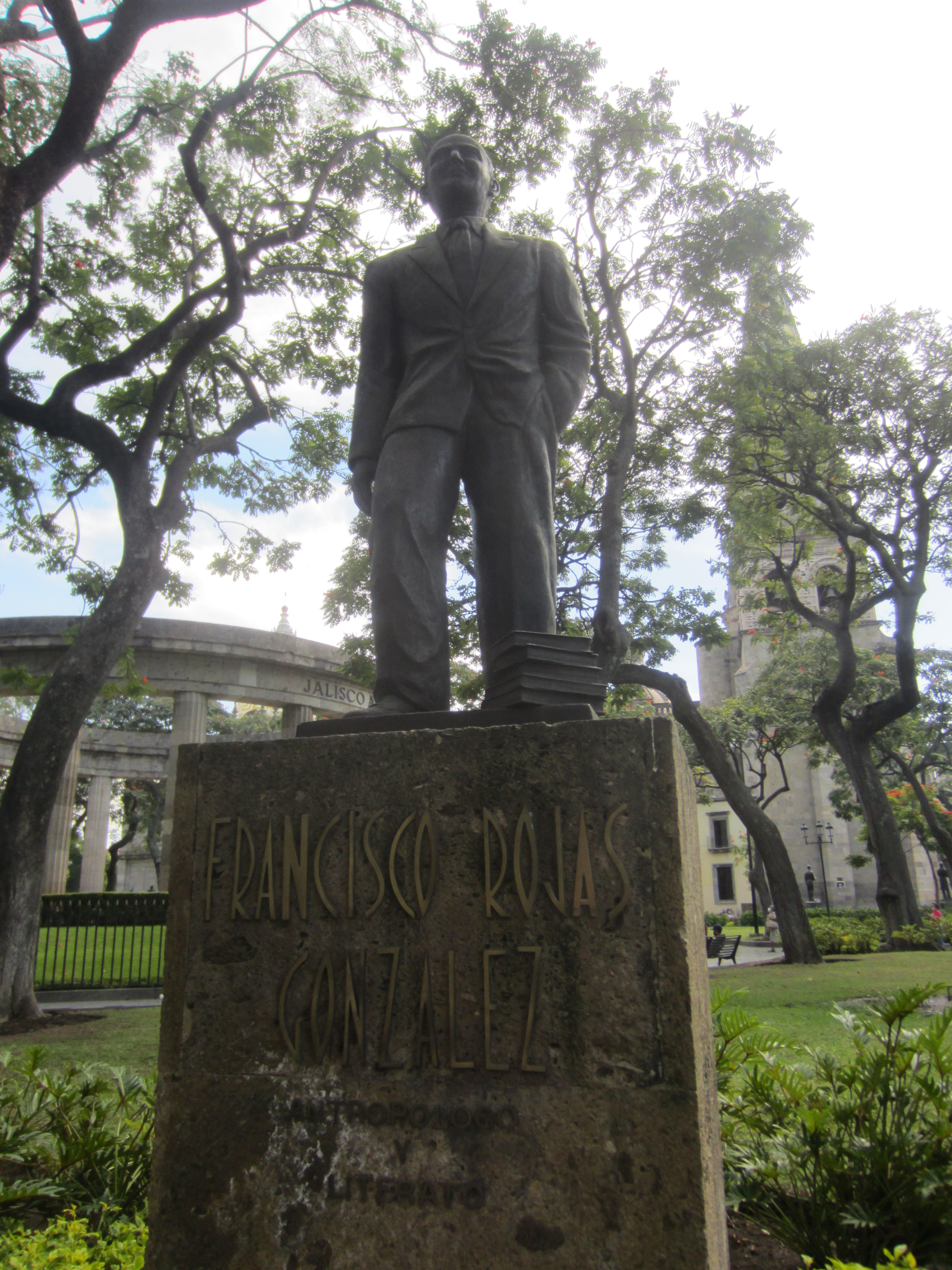
- The statue in 2021
- Subject: Francisco Rojas González
- Location: Guadalajara, Jalisco, Mexico; 20°40′40.9″N 103°20′49.9″W

A bronze statue of Francisco Rojas González is installed along the Rotonda de los Jaliscienses Ilustres, in Centro, Guadalajara, in the Mexican state of Jalisco.

In the early morning of 6 November 2017, two men were arrested after being caught removing the engraved letters.
