= Streetwalker (film) =

1951 film

- Directed by: Matilde Landeta
- Written by: José Aguila; Matilde Landeta; Luis Spota
- Produced by: Eduardo Soto Landeta
- Starring: Miroslava; Ernesto Alonso; Elda Peralta
- Cinematography: Rosalío Solano
- Edited by: Alfredo Rosas Priego
- Music by: Gonzalo Curiel
- Production company: TACMA
- Distributed by: Distribuidora Mexicana de Películas
- Release date: 22 June 1951
- Running time: 101 minutes
- Country: Mexico
- Language: Spanish

Streetwalker (Spanish: Trotacalles) is a 1951 Mexican drama film directed by Matilde Landeta and starring Miroslava, Ernesto Alonso and Elda Peralta. It was shot at the Clasa Studios in Mexico City. The film's sets were designed by the art director Luis Moya.

== Cast ==
- Miroslava as Elena
- Ernesto Alonsoas Rodolfo
- Elda Peralta as Maria; Azalea
- Miguel Ángel Ferriz as Don Faustino Irigoyen
- Aurora Izquierdo
- Enedina Díaz de León as Amiga anciana de Ruth
- Juan Orraca as Cura
- Adolfo Ramirez
- Rogelio Fernández as Secuaz de Rodolfo
- Salvador Godínez as Secuaz de Rodolfo
- Isabela Corona as Ruth
- Rodolfo Calvo as Embajador
- Jorge Cobián
- Beatriz Jimeno as Amiga de Elena
- Cecilia Leger as Esposa del embajador
- Kika Meyer as Amiga de Elena
- Diana Ochoa as Amiga de Ruth
- Carlos Rincón Gallardo as Mesero
- Wolf Ruvinskis as Carlos
- Eduardo Solís as Cantante
- Consuelo Vidal as Cantante
- Enrique Zambrano as Médico

== Bibliography ==
- Dever, Susan. Celluloid Nationalism and Other Melodramas: From Post-Revolutionary Mexico to fin de siglo Mexamerica. SUNY Press, 2012.
