= Korean Friendship Pavilion, Mexico =

Korean Friendship Pavilion
- Pabellón Coreano de la Amistad

General information
- Location: Chapultepec, Mexico City, Mexico
- Coordinates: 19.4253°N 99.1916°W

The Korean Friendship Pavilion (Spanish: Pabellón Coreano de la Amistad) is a Korean pavilion gifted to Mexico from South Korea, located in the park Chapultepec, Mexico City, Mexico. It was gifted as part of an international exchange program during the 1968 Summer Olympics, which was hosted in Mexico City. It was inaugurated on March 8, 1968.

The building is a miniature version of the iconic pagoda in Tapgol Park in Seoul. That original pagoda was the location that the 1919 Korean Declaration of Independence was issued as part of the Korean independence movement in the Japanese colonial period. The building was painted and carved in South Korea, then assembled at the final location. The South Korean diplomatic mission in Mexico is responsible for the upkeep of the building.

It is located in a part of the park reserved for people over the age of 60, to reflect the Korean Confucian values of respecting elders.

== See also ==
- Mexico–South Korea relations
- Pequeño Seúl – a nearby Koreatown in Mexico City
- Korean Cultural Center, Mexico City
- Dancheong – coloring style on the pavilion
- Ruta de la Amistad
