= Tales of Manhattan =

1942 film by Julien Duvivier

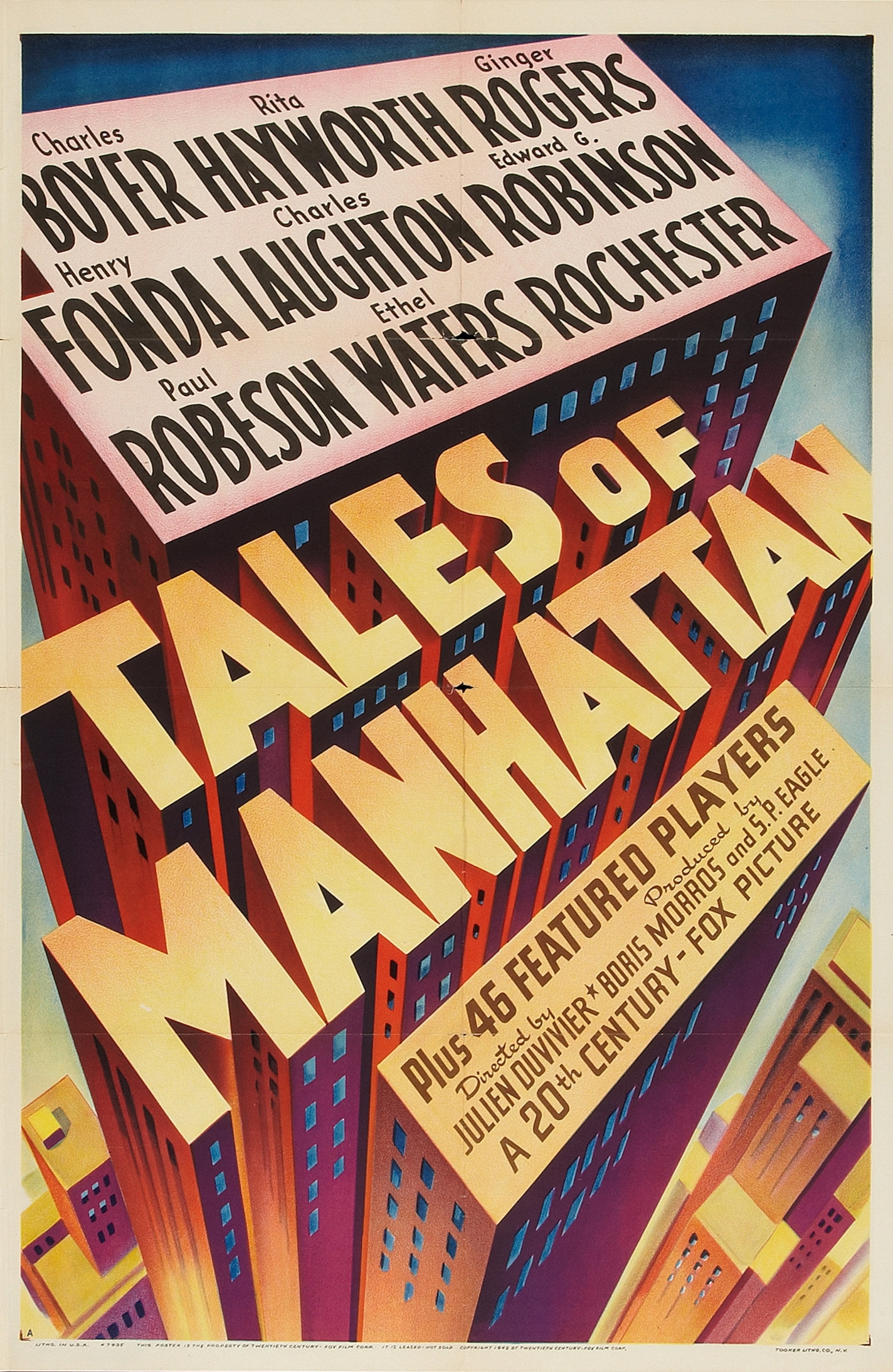
- Theatrical release poster
- Directed by: Julien Duvivier
- Written by: Ben Hecht; Alan Campbell; Ferenc Molnár; Samuel Hoffenstein; Donald Ogden Stewart; Lamar Trotti; László Görög; László Vadnay; Buster Keaton (uncredited)
- Produced by: Boris Morros; Sam Spiegel
- Starring: Charles Boyer; Rita Hayworth; Ginger Rogers; Henry Fonda; Charles Laughton; Edward G. Robinson; Ethel Waters; Paul Robeson; W. C. Fields
- Cinematography: Joseph Walker
- Edited by: Robert William Bischoff; Gene Fowler Jr.
- Music by: Sol Kaplan
- Distributed by: 20th Century Fox
- Release date: August 5, 1942
- Running time: 118 minutes 127 minutes (restored version)
- Country: United States
- Language: English
- Box office: $2.6 million (U.S. rentals)

Tales of Manhattan is a 1942 American anthology film directed by Julien Duvivier. Thirteen writers, including Ben Hecht, Alan Campbell, Ferenc Molnár, Samuel Hoffenstein, and Donald Ogden Stewart, worked on the six stories in this film. Based on the Mexican writer Francisco Rojas González's novel, Historia de un frac ("Story of a Tailcoat"), which he was not credited for, the stories follow a black formal tailcoat cursed by a cutter as it goes from owner to owner, in five otherwise unconnected stories.

== Plot ==
The tailcoat is custom made for renowned stage actor Paul Orman, who seeks to rekindle a romance with former flame Ethel, who is receptive. However, she is now married, and her husband John finds them together. John offers to show Paul his weapon collection, in particular his favorite hunting rifle. He deliberately loads it. Paul makes no move to escape and is shot by the jealous husband. As Paul feigns death, John claims to his wife, the sole witness, that it was an accident. Ethel finally realizes she loves John and tells him so; she agrees to support his story. Paul comes back to life, surprising the couple and telling them that John missed completely. Paul then leaves the couple, but later collapses in his limousine. He instructs his valet Luther to take him to the hospital to be treated.

Later Luther offers the topcoat, complete with a bullet hole, as collateral for a $10 loan from his friend Edgar. Edgar is the butler of Harry Wilson, who is about to marry Diane. However, Diane's friend Ellen, who is divorcing her husband for infidelity, dares her to examine the contents of Harry's topcoat. She finds a love letter from someone called "Squirrel" to her "passionate lion". Harry overhears and persuades his best man George to pretend that he took Harry's topcoat by mistake after a party last night and that the letter is actually his. George, who has feelings for Diane himself, reluctantly agrees. Diane is completely fooled ... and begins to see George (whom she thought of as "dim") in an entirely different, much more romantic light. Diane learns the truth when Squirrel shows up. She dumps Harry and leaves with George.

Afterward, Luther and Edgar pawn the topcoat for $10. It eventually ends up with Charles Smith, an unknown classical music composer. A friend arranges a meeting with famed conductor Arturo Bellini, who is impressed with his composition. He is offered the opportunity to conduct the premiere of his work at Carnegie Hall. At the last minute, he is informed he must be properly attired. Elsa hurriedly buys the topcoat for him, but it is a very tight fit. When he conducts, it rips at both shoulders and the audience erupts with laughter. Charles is brought to tears. However, Bellini stands up in his concert box, pointedly removes his own tailcoat and asks him to continue; one by one, the "gentlemen" in the audience remove their own tailcoats. After the triumphant performance, Charles donates the topcoat to charity.

Joe, who runs a mission for the poor, delivers a letter to alcoholic panhandler Larry Browne. It is an invitation to his 25th anniversary college reunion, held at the Waldorf Astoria Hotel. Joe convinces Larry to attend, hoping it will help him rebuild his life. Larry manages to convince his former classmates that he is successful, even getting a job offer, but one of them, Williams, knows that Larry was a shady lawyer in Chicago who was disbarred. When one man cannot find his wallet, the group hold a mock trial, with Larry as the defendant and Williams as the prosecutor. In the end, Larry ultimately tells everything and leaves. The next morning, however, three of his classmates come to the mission to let him know the job is still his.

The topcoat ends up in a second-hand shop, has an adventure with a tale featuring W. C. Fields, Phil Silvers and Margaret Dumont [see below]; where it is stolen by a thief. He wears it to get into an upscale illegal gambling parlor to rob the patrons. In his escape by plane, the jacket catches on fire and the panicked thief throws it out, with $43,000 of loot in the pockets. It lands by Luke and Esther, a poor Black couple. They take it to their minister, and they decide to give it to their congregation to buy whatever they have prayed for. An old farmer tells Luke that the only thing he prayed for is a scarecrow, so Luke gives him the now ragged jacket to make one.

== Cast ==
- Charles Boyer as [Paul] Orman
- Rita Hayworth as Ethel [Halloway]
- Ginger Rogers as Diane
- Henry Fonda as George
- Charles Laughton as Charles Smith
- Edward G. Robinson as [Avery "Larry" L.] Browne
- Paul Robeson as Luke
- Ethel Waters as Esther
- Eddie "Rochester" Anderson as Rev. Lazarus
- Thomas Mitchell as [John] Halloway
- Eugene Pallette as Luther
- Cesar Romero as Harry [Wilson]
- Gail Patrick as Ellen
- Roland Young as Edgar
- Marion Martin as Squirrel
- Elsa Lanchester as Mrs. [Elsa] Smith
- Victor Francen as Arturo Bellini
- George Sanders as Williams
- James Gleason as "Father" Joe
- Harry Davenport as Professor Lyons
- J. Carrol Naish as Costello
- The Hall Johnson Choir as Themselves
- Frank Orth as Second-hand Clothes Dealer
- Christian Rub as Wilson
- Sig Arno as Piccolo Player
- James Rennie as Hank Bronson
- Harry Hayden as David
- Morris Ankrum as Judge
- Don Douglas as Henderson
- Mae Marsh as Molly
- Clarence Muse as Grandpa
- George Reed as Christopher
- Cordell Hickman as Nicodemus
- Paul Renay as "Spud" Johnson
- Barbara Lynn as Mary
- Adeline De Walt Reynolds as Grandmother (as Adeline DeWalt Reynolds)
- Helene Reynolds as Actress

== Deleted sixth tale ==
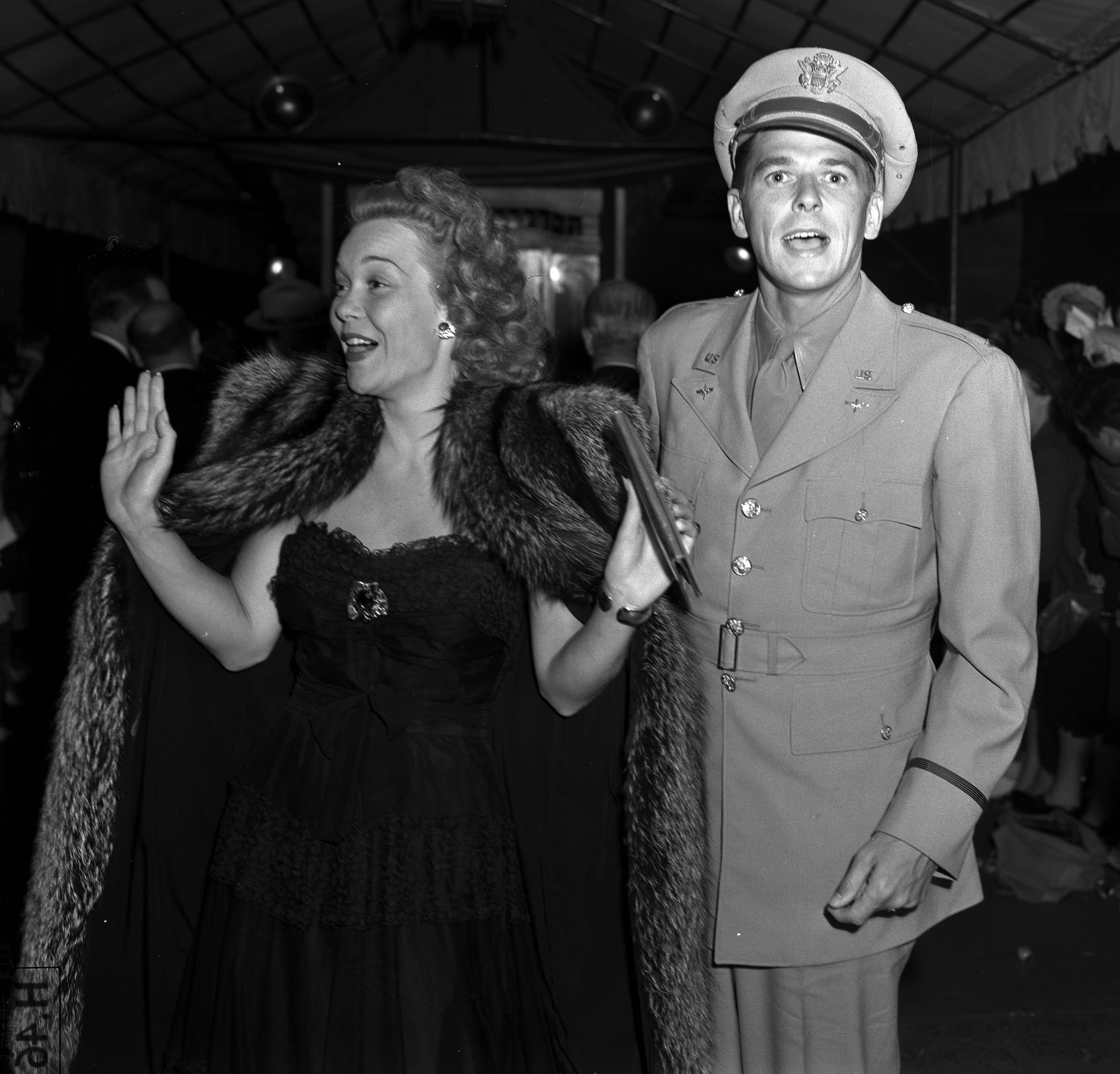
25-year-old Jane Wyman with husband and fellow actor Ronald Reagan at the film's premiere in Los Angeles in August 1942

A sixth tale featured W. C. Fields, Phil Silvers and Margaret Dumont. A conman (Fields) buys the jacket from the second-hand store that acquired it from the rescue mission of the fourth tale, thinking that it is stuffed with money from its former owner, who, according to the crooked shop salesman (Silvers), was "a millionaire". The conman wears the jacket to a lecture he is to give on abstinence from alcohol at the home of a wealthy woman (Dumont), where the coconut milk served as an alcohol alternative has been spiked with booze by her husband—turning the lecture into a drunken party.

The sequence was written primarily by Bert Lawrence, Anne Wigton, William Morrow and Edmund Beloin, with director Mal St. Clair "advising (Duvivier) on gags and comedy routines for Fields and other comics." This tale was fifth in the sequence and was supposedly cut because the film was too long. It was the easiest to remove without losing continuity and ironically, it was by far the funniest. Some sources indicate that excising the scene to reduce the film's running time was a convenient excuse; others among the cast were unhappy about being upstaged by Fields and wanted the scene cut.

The Fields sequence was discovered in the Fox vaults in the mid-1990s, seemingly intact. It appeared in Kevin Burns' Hidden Hollywood II: More Treasures from the 20th Century Fox Vaults, a 1997 television documentary spotlighting cut sequences from the studio's films. It was later included as a supplement on the VHS release of the film. The Fox Movie Channel runs the film in its entirety, with all six tales intact and in their intended sequence.

== Controversy surrounding fifth tale upon 1942 release ==
The final tale, starring Paul Robeson and Ethel Waters, depicted what were considered racial stereotypes, even in 1942. It came under severe criticism from both Edward G. Robinson and Robeson, who was a champion of good film roles for Black actors. Tales of Manhattan was Robeson's final attempt to work within Hollywood, after making only 12 movies and refusing lucrative film offers for over three years. Robeson was deeply disappointed with the sequence, which featured musical numbers by Robeson and the Hall Johnson choir.

Robeson initially thought that he and his associates could use the depiction of the plight of the rural Black poor—shown in the film as investing the bulk of their windfall in communal land and tools—to demonstrate a share-and-share-alike way of life. Although Robeson attempted to change some of the film's content during production, in the end he found it "very offensive to my people. It makes the Negro childlike and innocent and is in the old plantation hallelujah shouter tradition ... the same old story, the Negro singing his way to glory." To Robeson, it was a matter of human dignity, and outweighed what he considered his duty to promote communal ownership, inserted into the storyline for Robeson by screenwriter Donald Ogden Stewart.

Some reviewers and black entertainers (including Clarence Muse) noted that the film exposed Blacks' living conditions under the sharecropping system, but Robeson was so dissatisfied that he attempted to buy up all the prints and take the film out of distribution. Following its release, he held a press conference announcing that he would no longer act in Hollywood films because of the demeaning roles available to Black actors. Robeson also said he would gladly picket the film along with others who found the film offensive.

== Reception ==
Bosley Crowther wrote in The New York Times that "Tales of Manhattan is one of those rare films—a tricky departure from the norm, which, in spite of its five-ring-circus nature, achieves an impressive effect. Neither profound nor very searching, it nevertheless manages to convey a gentle, detached comprehension of the irony and pity of life, and it constantly grapples one's interest with its run of assorted incidents."
