= Black Angustias =

1950 film

- Directed by: Matilde Landeta
- Written by: Matilde Landeta; Francisco Rojas González
- Produced by: Eduardo S. Landeta
- Starring: María Elena Marqués; Agustín Isunza; Eduardo Arozamena
- Cinematography: Jack Draper
- Edited by: Gloria Schoemann
- Music by: Gonzalo Curiel
- Production company: Tacma
- Release date: 19 January 1950
- Running time: 82 minutes
- Country: Mexico
- Language: Spanish

Black Angustias (Spanish: La negra Angustias) is a 1950 Mexican war drama film directed by Matilde Landeta and starring María Elena Marqués, Agustín Isunza and Eduardo Arozamena. It was shot at the Churubusco Studios in Mexico City.

== Synopsis ==
Following the death of her father Angustias, a young Afro-Mexican woman joins the Mexican Revolution. She becomes the leader of a force of Zapatistas battling against the government.

== Cast ==
- María Elena Marqués as Angustias
- Agustín Isunza as Huitlacoche
- Eduardo Arozamena as Antón Farrera
- Gilberto González as Efren el picao
- Enriqueta Reza as Crescencia
- Fanny Schiller as Doña Chole
- Ramón Gay as Manuel de la Reguera
- Noemí Beltrán as Angustias niña
- Esteban Mayo as Compadre de Melitón
- Agustín Fernández as Hijo de revolucionario
- Guillermo Calles as Padre revolucionario
- Carlos Riquelme as Enrique Pérez
- Felipe de Flores as Revolucionario
- Lola Tinoco as Dueña burdel
- Elda Peralta as Novia del ingeniero
- Genaro de Alba as Modesto
- Rogelio Fernández as Hijo de revolucionario
- Salvador Godínez as Hijo de revolucionario

== Bibliography ==
- De la Mora, Sergio. Cinemachismo: Masculinities and Sexuality in Mexican Film. University of Texas Press, 2009.
- Riera, Emilio García. Historia documental del cine mexicano: 1949. Ediciones Era, 1969.
