= Korean Cultural Center, Mexico City =

Cultural organization in Mexico

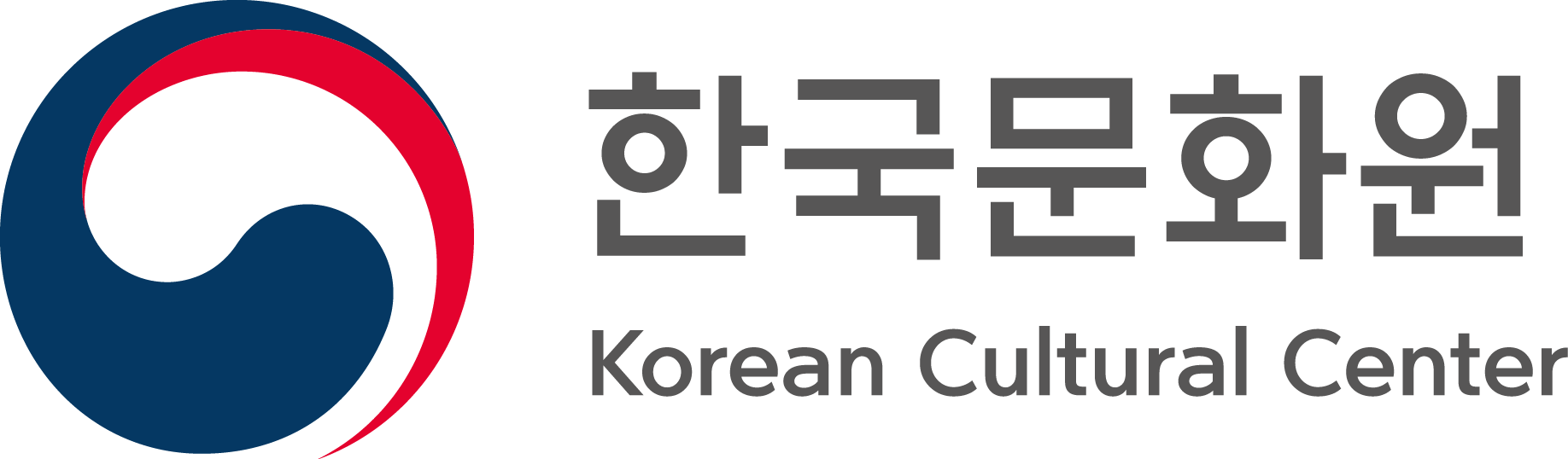

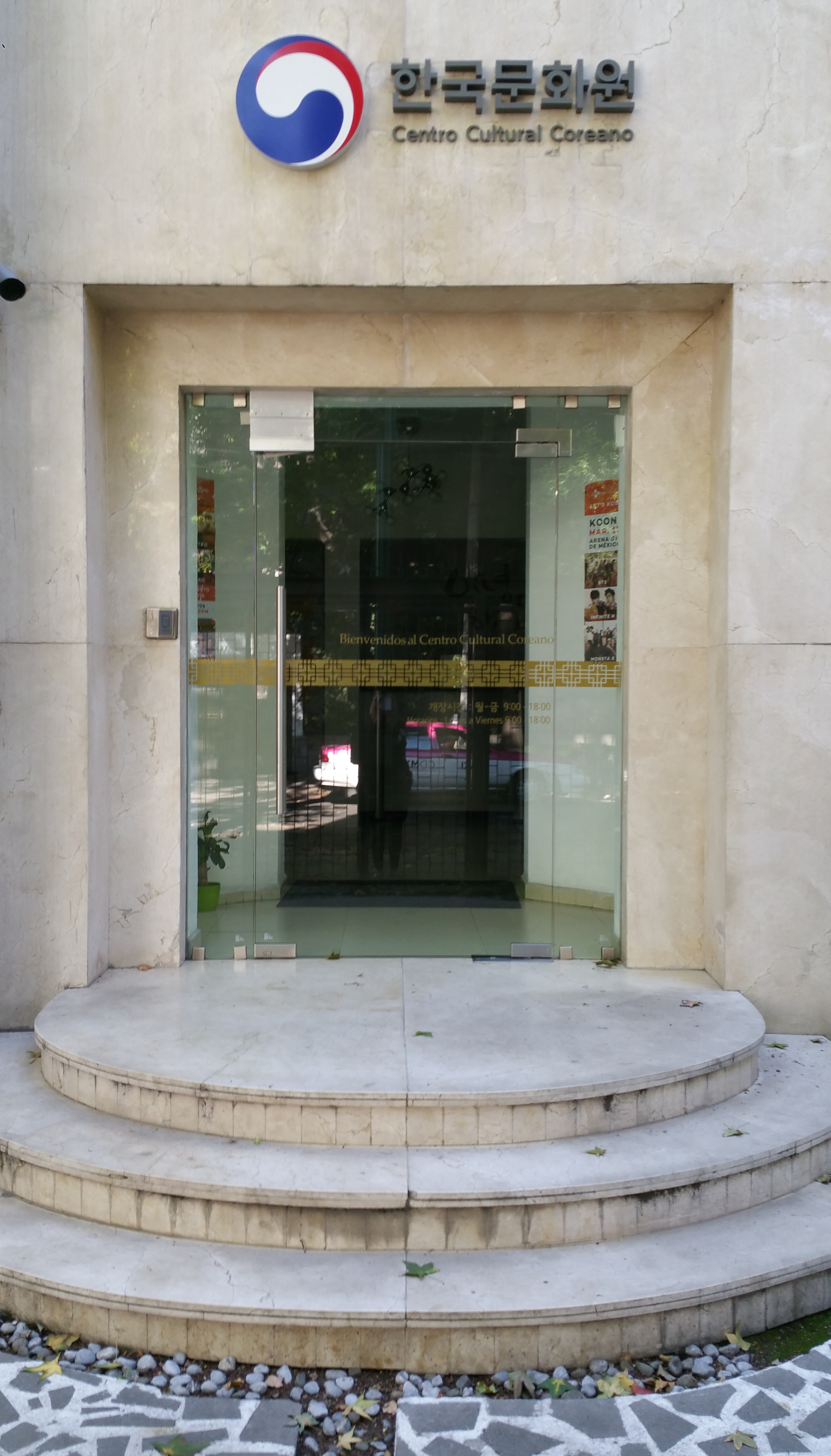
- March 20, 2017
- Native name: Centro Cultural Coreano, Ciudad de México
- Type: Cultural Center
- Founded: March 13, 2012; 14 years ago
- Founder: Ministry of Culture, Sports and Tourism
- Headquarters: Temístocles 122, Polanco, Mexico City, Mexico
- Key people: Ki Jin-song (current Director); Seo Nam-gyo (past Director)
- Services: Movie theater, library, exhibitions, language education, culinary arts
- Website: mexico.korean-culture.org/es/welcome

The Korean Cultural Center, Mexico City (Spanish: Centro Cultural Coreano, Ciudad de México, Korean: 멕시코 시티 한국문화원), is a non-profit Korean language and cultural exchange center in Polanco, Mexico City. It is supported by the South Korean Ministry of Culture, Sports and Tourism and run by their KOCIS organization. The center opened on March 13, 2012, coinciding with the 50th anniversary of diplomatic ties between South Korea and Mexico. It was the twenty-third Korean Cultural Center opened in the world, and the fourth in North America. With approximately 30,000 K-pop fans in Mexico City at the time, the Ministry projected that the new center would "combine forces with them to spread K-pop to all over the country and play a role as a bridge between the two cultures".

== History and background ==
=== 2012 opening and other centers ===
On March 10, 2012, the center held a pre-opening event in commemoration of the 50th anniversary of the 1962 diplomatic relations established with Mexico, and included performances of samul nori, fusion gugak, breakdancing and taekwondo. The March 13 opening was attended by South Korean Ambassador to Mexico, Hong Seong-heo, the Secretariat of Tourism's Assistant Secretary of Planning, Jorge Mezher Rage the Minister of Culture, Sports and Tourism Choe Kwang-shik, the National Council for Culture and Arts President Consuelo Sáizar, and about 200 dignitaries from both countries.

The Polanco location, the 23rd cultural center established worldwide and the fourth in North America; was preceded by the February opening of one in Hungary, and followed by a June opening in India. To the south, the first South American center was opened in Buenos Aires, Argentina in 2006, and in São Paulo, Brazil in 2013. By October 2018, there were 32 centers worldwide in 27 countries, with seven centers in the Americas - Argentina, Brazil, Canada, Mexico, and three in the U.S. (Korean Cultural Center, Los Angeles, Korean Cultural Center New York, and Washington, D.C.).

=== Korean culture in Mexico City ===
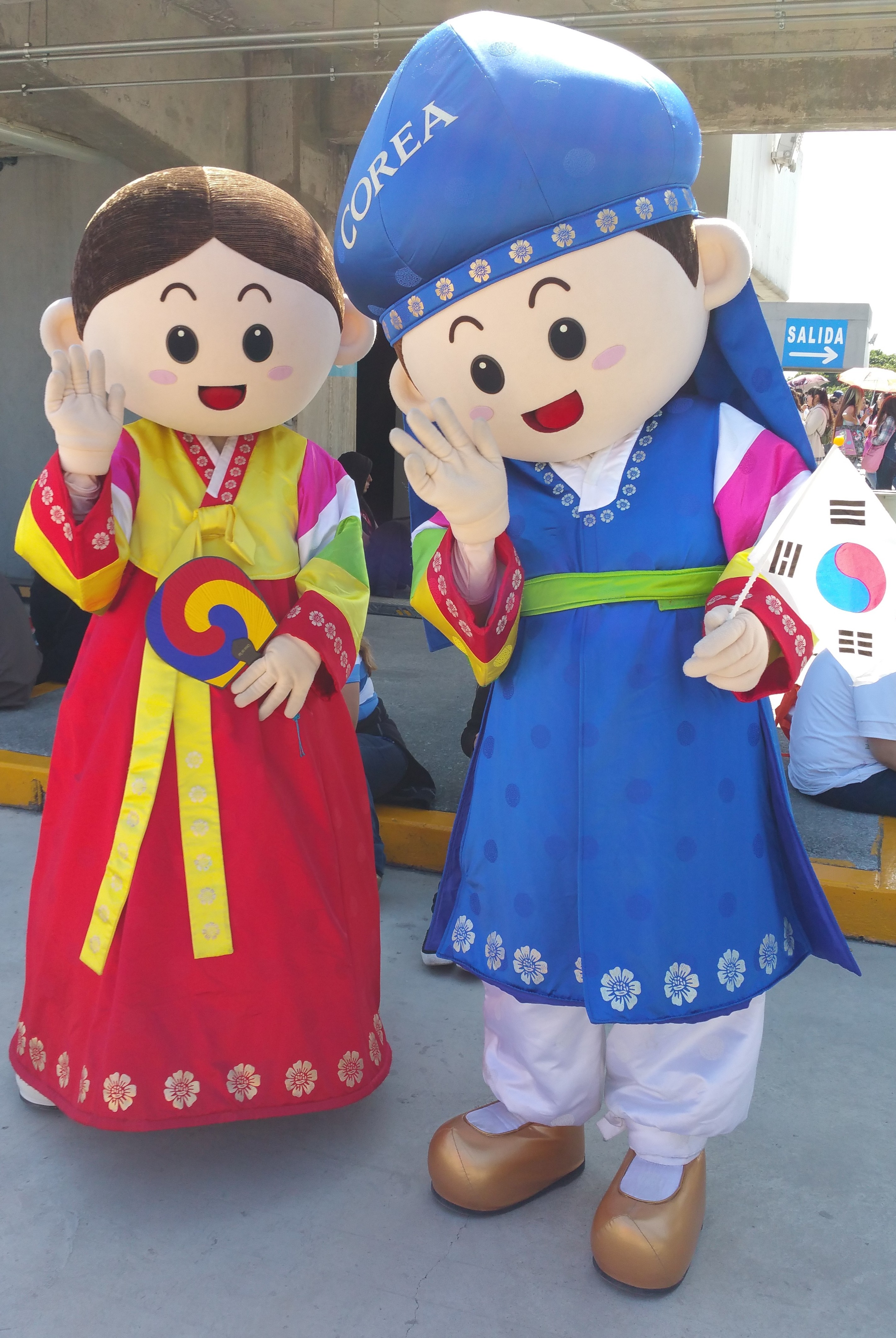
KCON Mexico 2017, Mexican-Coreano good will ambassadors.

The first recorded large-scale migration of Koreans to Mexico was a boat of 1,000 that sailed from Incheon in 1905, to the port of Salina Cruz. By 2003, the National Institute of Migration reported 15,000 South Koreans residing in Mexico, about 8,000 in the capital, with most of them in Tepito, a high crime area known as "barrio bravo" or the "wild neighbourhood", and also running businesses in the Zona Rosa. In September, 2013, The New York Times reported that the Korean center calculated 12,000 Koreans living in Mexico.

In January, 2011, Cynthia Arvide, a Mexican writer for Chilango described her attempts, and failure, to interview a Korean business woman in the Zona Rosa area, between Chapultepec and Reforma, partially due to the language barrier. She wrote, "I discovered that the little Korea of the DF (Distrito Federal) is a trip to the other side of the world without leaving home", and "Its inhabitants do not speak or write like us, they do not eat the same thing, they listen to another type of music and they watch soap operas where no one kisses".

Time Out's Alberto Acuña welcomed the Mexico City center in 2013, a year after its opening, referencing the existing "Little Seoul" (Pequeño Seúl) neighborhood of the Zona Rosa, which had already been a tourist attraction for a decade due to its restaurants and entertainment. He said the cultural center had added "an attractive agenda of artistic activities (exhibitions, traditional music concerts, craft fairs) and academics (language and history courses). South Korean)", and premiers of blockbuster films and those by Kim Ki-duk and Bong Joon-ho.

The center's founding Director Seo Nam-gyo said that one of the center's main activities would be to teach the Korean language to Mexican children, youths and adults. In April, 2017, Eva Ocaña Islas of the School of High Studies (FES) Acatlán and Fabián Robles, Director of the Asociación Cultural para la Investigación sobre Asia (ACIA) included the center's Sejong Institute in their list of Korean language programs (also with TOPIK) available in and around Mexico City, along with older programs, such as one at Escuela Nacional de Lenguas, Lingüística y Traducción which began teaching Korean in 1995, and another at ACIA which started in 2003.

In October, 2017, two of the center's teachers spoke about their transition to life in Mexico in interviews with K-Magazine, which reports on Korean culture in Mexico and Latin America. Choi Hee-jung, a Korean language teacher at the center's Sejong Institute, in Mexico since 1996, said that one of the first barriers was speaking the Spanish language, which she knew, but was not fluent in. Oh Jung-a, a gastronomy teacher at the center, moved to Mexico in 2011, and also had to learn Spanish. She described the similarities of Mexicans wrapping food with tortillas and Koreans wrapping food with leaves of vegetables.

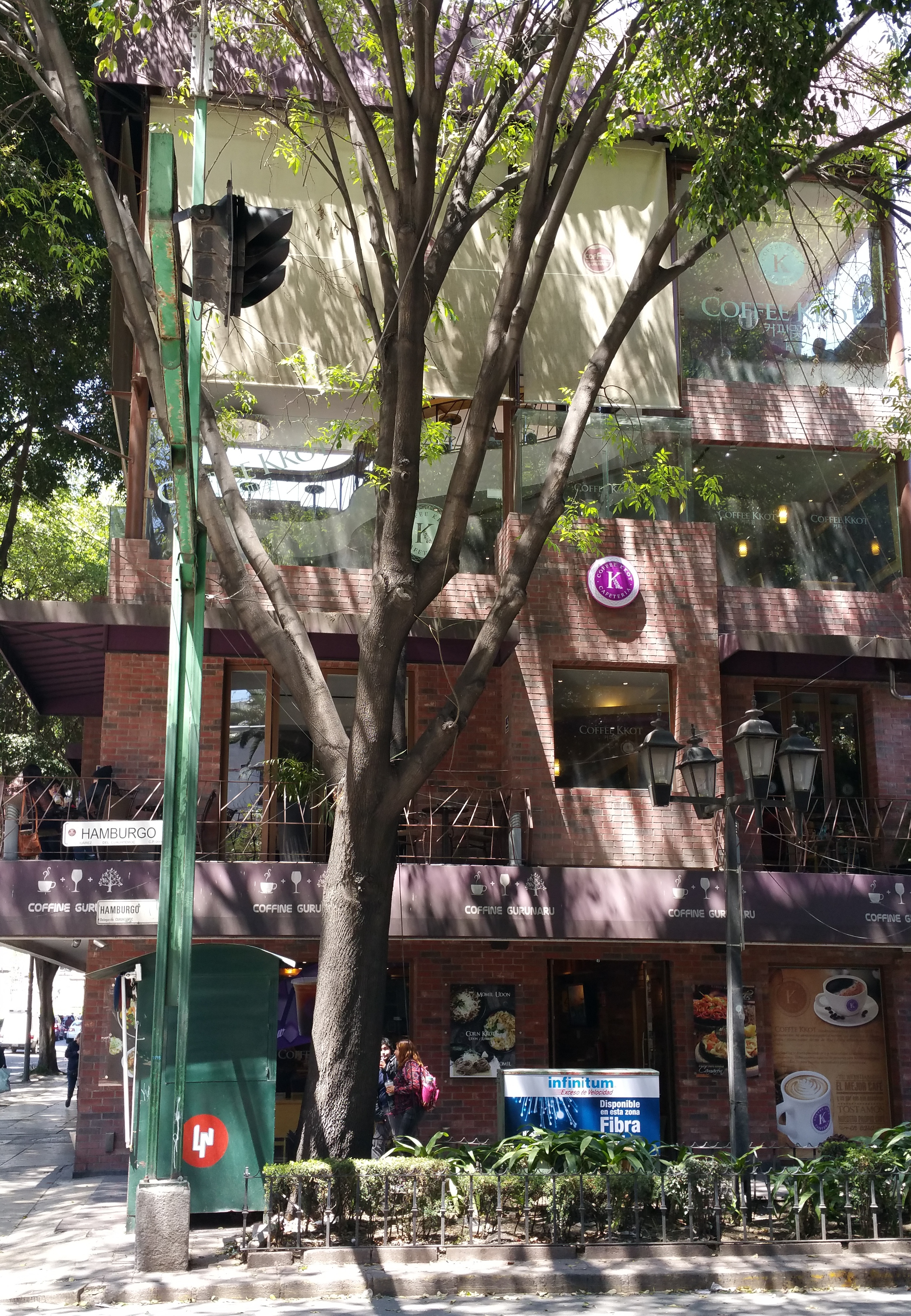
Coffee Kkot, corner of Hamburgo and Florencia, Pequeño Seúl, 2017

=== 2016 first festival held ===
On December 3–4, 2016, the center and the Mexico City government held the first Korean culture festival in the Zona Rosa, in Pequeño Seúl, with support from the Ministry of Foreign Affairs and KOCIS. The main stage was set up between Hamburgo and Genova streets and events included samu nori, taekwondo demonstrations, K-pop music and a piano concert. Street stalls displayed Korean food, Korean calligraphy, Korean Art, hanbok, hanji and baduk. Writer Susan Velasquez applauded the Mexico City government's recognition of the Korean community's efforts and abilities to attract tourists and the cultural exchange between Mexicans and Koreans, but called the effects limited, "After the Korean stalls and vendors that clearly marked the presence of Pequeño Seúl were taken down, the space returned to being one part of Zona Rosa, a part that is a fragmented landscape of Korean symbols scattered along the streets".

== Effects of Hallyu ==
=== Selection of Mexico City ===
The selection of Mexico City and other cities for the location of new centers in 2012 were determined partly by a calculated tracking of Hallyu and its financial effects on South Korea. KOCIS Director Seo Kang-soo said the "ripple effect of K-Pop fever is expanding as a growing number of youths in Latin America, Europe and the U.S. can enjoy Korean songs and music videos through You Tube". He also said KOCIS realizes the strengthening of soft power through culture. A Korea Customs Service report, that compared South Korea's export growth rates in hallyu countries to non-hallyu countries during the 2005-2010 period, showed growth in hallyu countries. The Latin American hallyu countries of Mexico, Peru and Brazil showed high percentages of growth; while non-hallyu countries Guatemala, Colombia and Venezuela did not. The ministry said the hallyu popularity of K-pop and Korean dramas had grown in Europe and America in 2011, and centers would be set up in developing countries which had the greater demands. However, critics have questioned what kind of national brand is being portrayed by using hallyu, and the effects, if any, of soft power's socio-political benefits; but remain optimistic for a short-term economic impact.

The Latin American country with the oldest cultural center, Argentina, hosted its first K-pop contest in October, 2010, with fans from ten different Latin American countries participating. In the Mexico City center's opening year, 2012, the ministry said there were already more than 30,000 fans of Korean pop culture in the city. In September, 2013, The New York Times reported there were 70 fan clubs for Korean pop music in Mexico, with at least 60,000 members. In April, 2018, Chilango magazine reported that Mexico was second only to Chile with the number of K-pop fans, and had held concerts for bands such as Super Junior, Red Velvet and Exo.

=== K-pop academy and world K-pop dance contests ===
On June 7, 2016, the center announced a training course that would give fans a chance to see what it would be like to be a Korean pop star (Korean idol), dubbed the "K-pop Academy". Sponsored by the ministry, it was offered at the center and the Instituto Nacional de Bellas Artes. Howon University, in charge of the 10-week training program, selected professional vocal trainers and choreographers who had worked with top groups like TVXQ, JYJ and Girls' Generation; and over 400 applicants applied for 40 available spots.

The center hosts annual global singing and dance competitions whose finalists travel to Seoul for final competitions; the K-Pop World Festival for a number of years, and K-pop Cover Dance Festival for the second time in 2018.

== Facilities ==
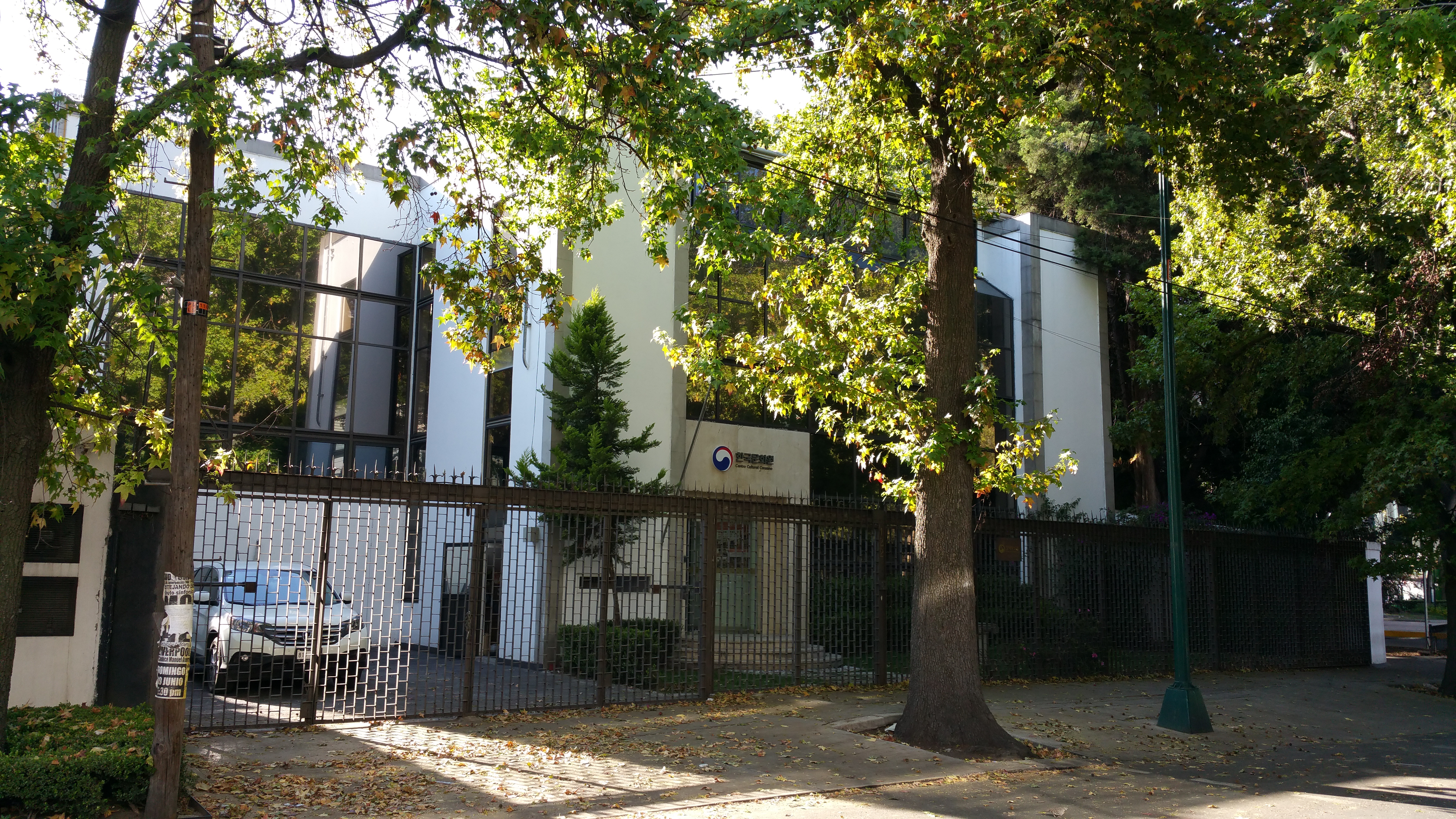
Centro Cultural Coreano main entrance

The center is an 800 meter building with three floors, with a capacity of a thousand people and the following floor layout:

- Exhibition hall - 1st
- Audiovisual room - 1st
- Traditional music workshop - 1st
- Auditorium - 2nd
- Management offices - 2nd
- Kitchen workshop - 2nd
- Library- 3rd
- Classroom - 3rd
- Boardroom - 3rd
- Terrace - 3rd

== See also ==
- Mexico–South Korea relations
- Koreans in Mexico
- Pequeño Seúl
- Korean Friendship Pavilion, Mexico
- Korean art
- Culture of Korea
