= Pequeño Seúl =

Koreatown in Mexico City, Mexico

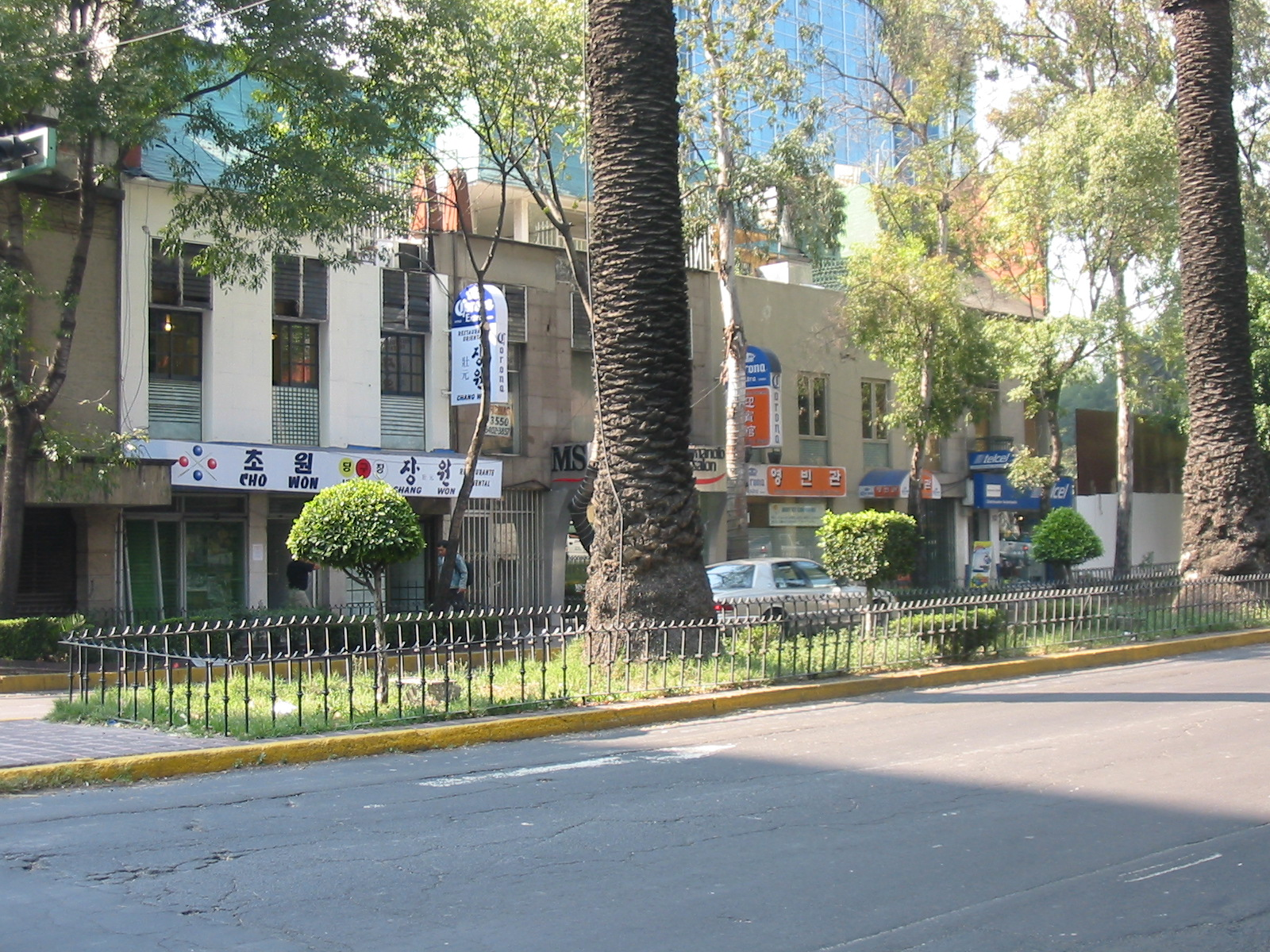
- Korean businesses on Florencia Street (2007)

- Location within Mexico City
- Coordinates: 19.4244°N 99.1686°W

Pequeño Seúl (Korean: 작은 서울; RR: jageun seoul; lit. 'Little Seoul') is a Koreatown in Mexico City. Most of the city's Korean population lives in and around the Zona Rosa.

According to the newspaper Reforma, there are at least 5,000 Koreans living in Zona Rosa and about 6,000 total in Colonia Juárez, the larger officially recognized neighborhood of which the Zona Rosa is a part of. Many Korean residents do not speak Spanish and are relatively isolated from their Mexican neighbors. The area around Hamburgo, Praga, Berna and Biarritz streets have converted into "Pequeño Seul," or Little Seoul, with Biarritz Street's residents almost 90% Korean. The number of Korean residents in the colonia continues to increase even as the number of younger people in general decreases.

== History ==
There are an estimated 9,000 Korean nationals living in Mexico City. Most immigrated to Mexico in the 1990s and first decade of the 21st century, as a result of commercial agreements signed by the Mexican government and those of Korea and Taiwan, allowing companies such as Daewoo to bring workers over from Asia. However, according to some sources, such as Alfredo Romero, professor of the Faculty of Political and Social Sciences at UNAM, a large percentage of Koreans living in Mexico have questionable immigration status.

Most Koreans are business owners with establishments such as restaurants, video rental places, bars and saunas, many of which cater exclusively to the Korean population, with signs and menus in Korean. There have been conflicts between Korean-owned businesses and Mexican neighbors over noise and sanitation issues, with some Mexicans complaining that the Koreans do not want to adapt to Mexican society. Another issue has been legal problems, both with the status of merchandise and the status of employees. A store owned by Koreans was shut down by police for selling imported merchandise of questionable origin in 2002, with 33 workers detained.

The Korean community has a weekend school aimed at preserving knowledge of the Korean language: the Escuela Coreana en México, located on Liverpool street in the Zona Rosa. For two decades it occupied a variety of rented facilities, but in 2010 it was able to acquire its own premises thanks to US$850,000 in donations by companies and other benefactors to the Asociación de Residentes Coreanos en México.

== See also ==
- Koreans in Mexico
- Korean Cultural Center, Mexico City
- Korean Friendship Pavilion, Mexico
