= Francisco Rojas González =

Mexican anthropologist and writer (1904–1951)

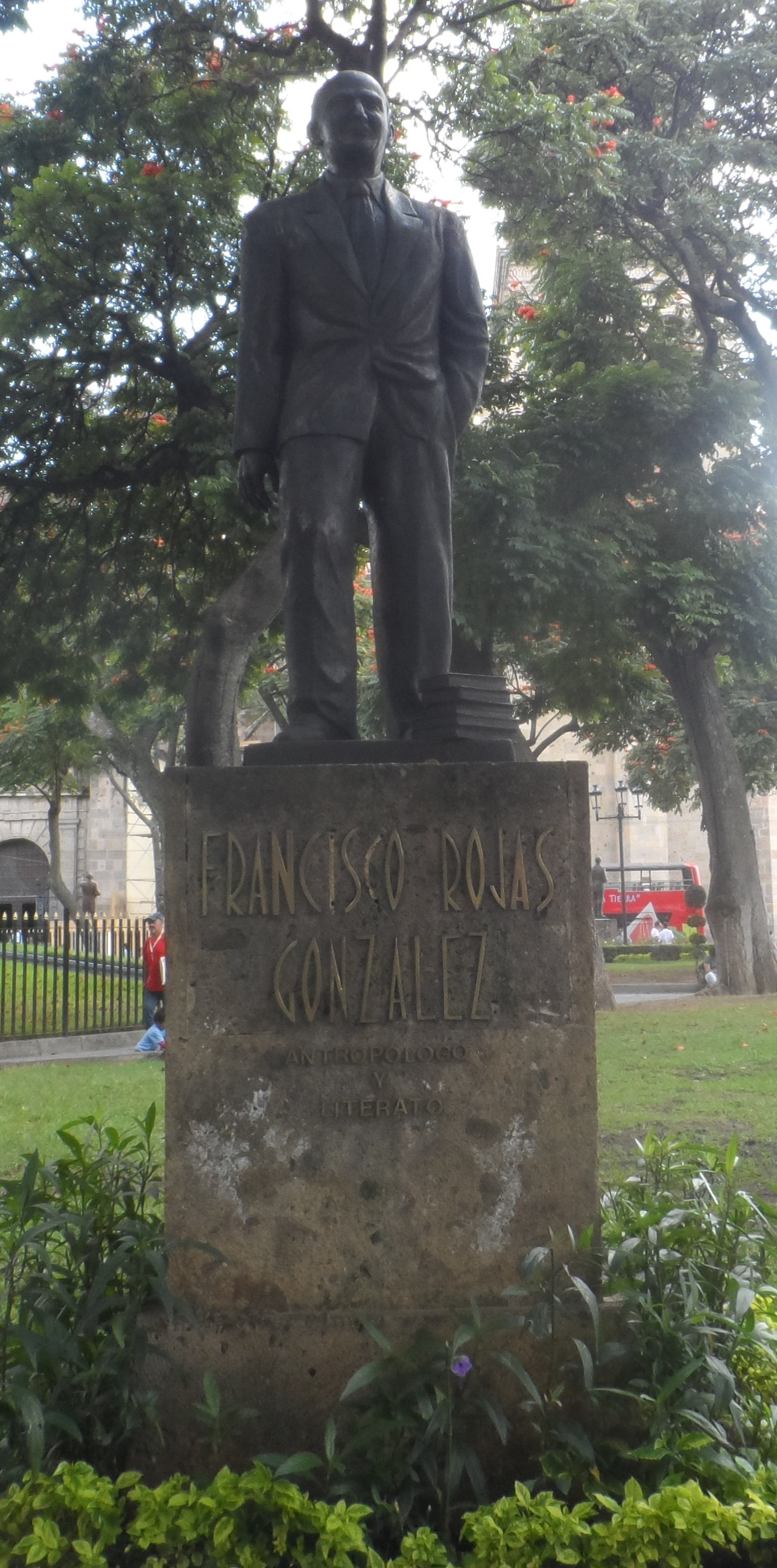
- Statue of Francisco Rojas González in Guadalajara
- Born: August 11, 1904; Guadalajara, Jalisco, Mexico
- Died: December 11, 1951 (aged 47); Guadalajara, Jalisco, Mexico
- Occupations: Writer, ethnologist, screenwriter, author
- Spouse: María Lilia Lozano Tejeda
- Writing career
- Language: Spanish
- Genres: Novel, short story, screenplay
- Notable works: La negra Angustias; El diosero

Francisco Rojas González (August 11, 1904 – December 11, 1951) was a Mexican writer, ethnologist, and screenwriter. He was particularly noted as an author of essays, short stories, and novels. He received the National Prize for Literature in 1944.

== Biography ==
Rojas González was born in the Nueve Esquinas neighborhood of Guadalajara, but spent much of his childhood in La Barca, Jalisco, where his family moved. He completed his primary education there. He later studied commerce and administration in Mexico City and ethnography at the National Museum. He served as foreign minister in Guatemala and as consul in Salt Lake City, Denver, and San Francisco. In 1935, he retired from the Foreign Service and joined the Institute of Social Research at the National Autonomous University of Mexico (UNAM). Rojas González collaborated on numerous ethnographic works, including "Four Geographical Maps of the Languages of Mexico," "Ethnological Studies of the Mezquital Valley," "Ethnological Study of Ocoyoacac," "The Zapotecs," "The Tarascans," "Ethnographic Caste of Mexico," and "Ethnographic Atlas of Mexico." He was an editor for the magazine "Crisol" and a contributor to the country's leading newspapers and magazines.

His short story "The Story of a Tailcoat" (1930) (orig. Historia de un frac) was adapted for the Hollywood screen in 1942 in a film by French director Julien Duvivier, Tales of Manhattan. Since he was not given credit, Rojas accused the producers of plagiarism. 20th Century Fox, the movie studio that produced the film, blamed the co-producer, who became insolvent.

In addition to "The Story of a Tailcoat," his novels Lola Casanova and La negra Angustias were adapted and brought to the big screen by Mexican director Matilde Landeta. The novel La negra Angustias earned him the National Literature Prize in 1944.

The writer Juan de Dios Bojórquez, known as Djed Bórquez, also published a biographical tribute to Francisco Rojas González in the Revista de la Universidad de México in 1953. The author describes him as an observant man deeply in love with Mexican culture, a love reflected in works such as "El Diosero," with its many stories that proudly describe the traditions and colors of different peoples and regions of the country; La negra Angustias, which faithfully portrays the times of the Revolution and the lives of the soldaderas; and in his many essays that address the history of Mexico's peoples and ethnic groups.

In a Mexico City church, he married María Lilia Lozano Tejeda (1915–1996), with whom he started a family. He died in Guadalajara on December 11, 1951.

== Works ==
- History of a Tailcoat (short story, 1930)
- On the Literature of the Revolution (essay published in the magazine Crisol in 1934)
- The Mexican Short Story: Its Evolution and Its Values (essay published in the magazine Tiras de Colores in 1944)
- La negra Angustias (1944)
- Tales of Yesterday and of Today (1946)
- Lola Casanova (1947)
- On the Route of the Mexican Short Story (published in the magazine Mexico in Art in 1950)
- The God-Maker (posthumously edited book of indigenous short stories, 1952)
- Complete Stories, Fondo de Cultura Económica (1971)
- Uncollected Stories, Ministry of Culture of Jalisco, Guadalajara (1992)

== See also ==
- Statue of Francisco Rojas González in the Rotonda de los Jaliscienses Ilustres, Guadalajara
- La negra Angustias (film), 1950 motion picture adaptation of his novel
