= Enriqueta Reza =

Mexican actress (1893–1968)

- Born: María Enriqueta Reza Casals; 3 April 1893; Acapulco, Guerrero, Mexico
- Died: 17 September 1968 (aged 75)
- Notable work: Una familia de tantas
- Title: Actress
- Spouse: Miguel Inclán

Enriqueta Reza (3 April 1893 – 17 September 1968) was a Mexican actress, performing during the Golden Age of Mexican cinema. She acted in a total of 67 films and won the Ariel Award for A Family Like Many Others in 1950.

== Biography ==
Enriqueta Reza was born on 3 April 1893. Her first cinema appearance was in 1943 in the movie Toros, Amor y Gloria. She acted in a total of 67 movies.

In her youth she had established her own theater company and managed to create unforgettable characters for the Mexican scene.

She won the Ariel Award as a best supporting actress in 1950 with the movie Una famila de tantas. Her most notable films were "In the palm of your hand", "La maquerida", "El siete Machos", "Los bandidos de Rio Frio", "El ahijado de la muerte", and "Lluvia roja" The last part she took in a film was during 1968 – "Los recuerdos del porvenir".

=== Legacy ===
Annually, in Mexico, there is a film festival de San Sebastian in which movies from the Golden Age of Mexican Cinema are viewed. Pictures and movies of the actress are presented there in front of the audience.

== Selected filmography ==
Year	Movie
1945	Adam, Eve and the Devil
1947	Strange Appointment
1949	La malquerida
1950	Rosauro Castro
1950	Black Angustias
1950	Red Rain
1950	The Little House
1951	En la palma de tu mano
1951	Deseada
1951	El siete machos
1954	Untouched

=== Ariel Awards ===
Year	Category	Film	Result
1947	Best Female Role	Canaima	Nominated
1950	Best Supporting Actress	Una familia de tantas	Won
