= Villa Olímpica (Mexico City) =

Coordinates: 19.298410°N 99.186957°W

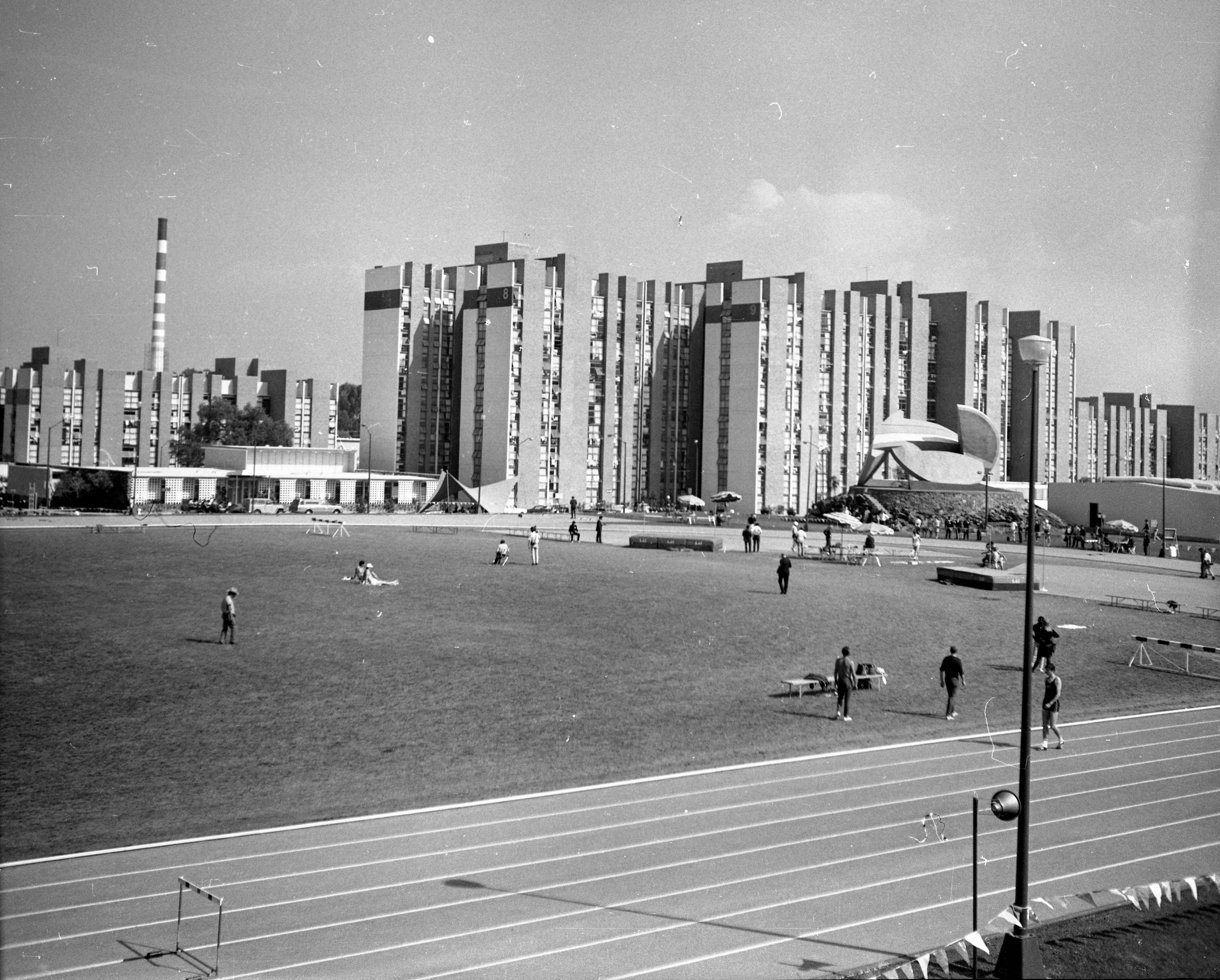
Villa Olímpica in 1968

The Villa Olímpica (English: Olympic Village) is a residential complex located in the southern part of Mexico City, constructed for the 1968 Summer Olympic Games. Originally, the 29 buildings served as accommodation for athletes, officials of international sports federations, and members of the international press. Following the conclusion of the Games, it was systematically converted into a permanent residential community.

== Planning and construction ==
The Olympic Village was built on an area originally covering approximately nine hectares, which belonged to the state-owned Banco Nacional de Obras y Servicios Públicos (National Public Works and Services Bank). The site was later expanded by around twenty thousand square meters donated by the Loreto y Peña Pobre paper factory. The location in the Tlalpan area was particularly suitable due to its volcanic subsoil, which allowed for rapid and stable construction.

Construction began on May 2, 1967, under the observation of national and international media. The construction period lasted approximately five hundred days, representing a remarkable logistical achievement given the scale of the project. The complex was officially inaugurated in September 1968. Financing was carried out through a combination of public institutions, with the residential section funded by the Banco Nacional de Obras y Servicios Públicos and the remaining infrastructure financed by the Ministry of Public Works.

== Architecture and structure ==
The Villa Olímpica Libertador Miguel Hidalgo (Note: Named for Miguel Hidalgo y Costilla.) was designed as a multifunctional complex that would meet both the specific requirements of a temporary Olympic village and those of a permanent residential development. The complex consisted of 29 high-rise buildings of varying heights, a church, and temporary structures for the administration of the village. 16 of the housing units have six floors, while 13 rise to ten floors.

The residential complex comprises a total of 904 apartments with 5,044 rooms. The buildings were named after figures from Greek mythology, including Zeus, Hera, Apollo, Athena, and Prometheus, symbolically linking the complex to the ancient Olympic tradition. (Note: The names given were Iris, Heracles, Aquiles, Teseo, Ulises, Eros, Atlas, Prometeo, Zeus, Hera, Apolo, Poseidón, Artemisa, Atenea, Hermes, Hefestos, Hestia, Urano, Gea, Cronos, Cibeles, Cloris, Higia, Temis, Heba, Eolo, Aristeo, Tritón and Selene.)

The site is divided into several functional zones. In addition to residential buildings, it includes training facilities, outdoor sports areas, administrative buildings, commercial zones, and medical services. The main entrance is located at a plaza along Avenida de los Insurgentes Sur, which serves as a key connection to the rest of the city.

== Architects ==
The team of architects consisted of Manuel González Rul, Agustín Hernández Navarro, Ramón Torres Martínez, Carlos Ortega Viramontes, and Héctor Velázquez.

== Use during the 1968 Olympic Games ==
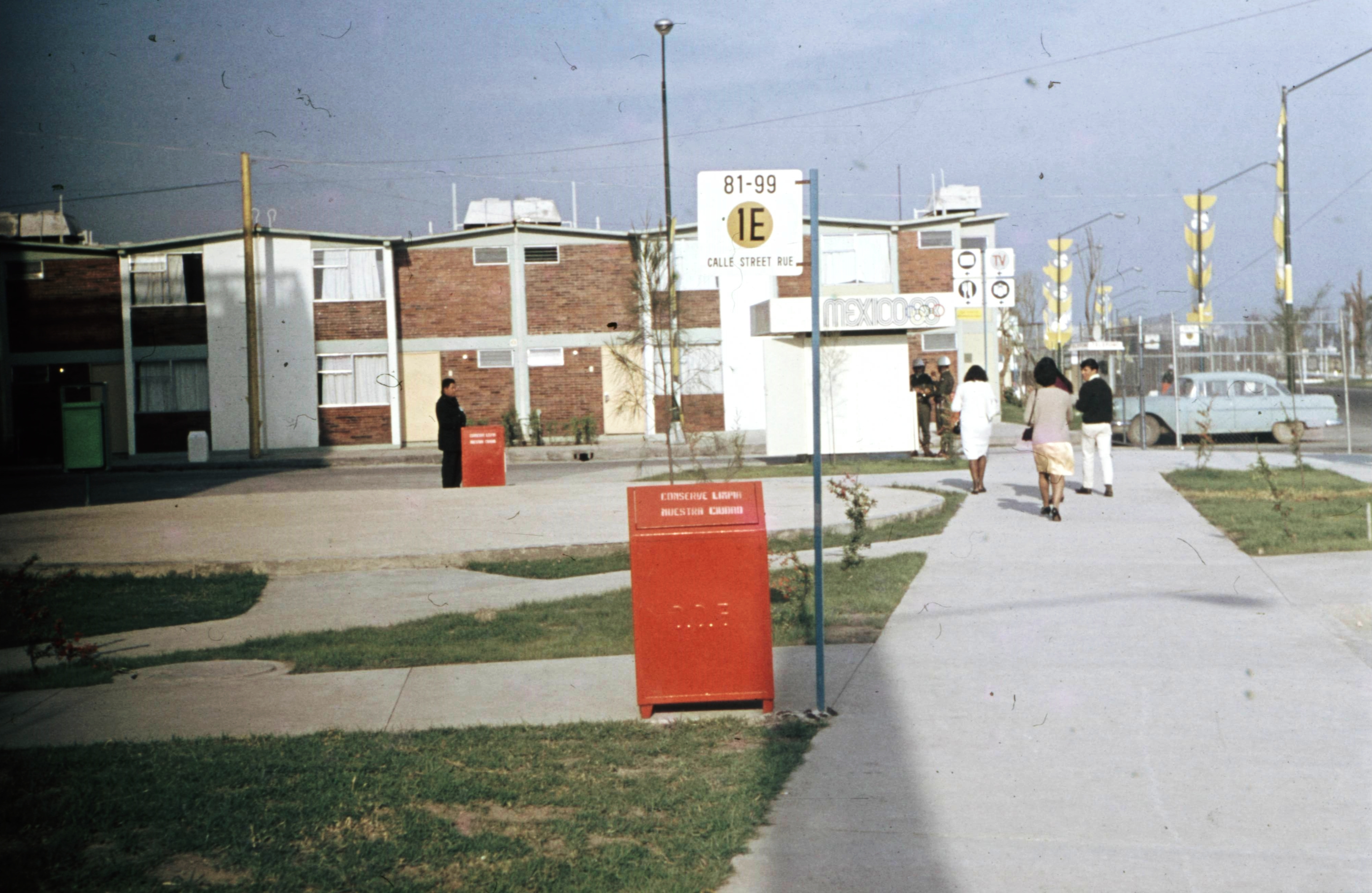
Section 1E

During the Olympic Games, the village was divided into clearly separated sections. Twenty-four buildings formed the area for the men, while three buildings were reserved for female athletes. Two additional buildings were designated for members of the press. This spatial separation followed the regulations of the International Olympic Committee (IOC) at the time.

The complex was organized as a fully self-sufficient unit. It included an administration and registration center, medical facilities, training halls, a press center, and extensive dining services. Six large dining halls provided daily meals for more than six thousand athletes as well as thousands of other participants. Operations were supported by over one thousand staff members, modern kitchen equipment, and a dedicated quality control laboratory.

In addition to athletic preparation, social life played a central role. The International Club served as a meeting place for athletes and hosted cultural events, film screenings, and recreational activities. Religious facilities were also available, offering services for multiple faiths.

In the end, a total of 13,835 guests spent an average of twenty days in the Olympic village. For that, more than 6,000 personal were employed in the operation of the venues.

== Archaeological Discoveries and Cultural Integration ==
During construction, significant remains of the pre-Columbian Cuicuilco culture were discovered, which had been buried by lava flows from the Xitle volcano. Under the direction of the National Institute of Anthropology and History (INAH), these structures were excavated, restored, and partially integrated into the design of the complex. Some of the reconstructed structures were incorporated into public spaces such as open-air theaters and green areas, creating a unique integration of modern architecture and archaeological heritage. These spaces were also used as part of the Cultural Olympiad of 1968.

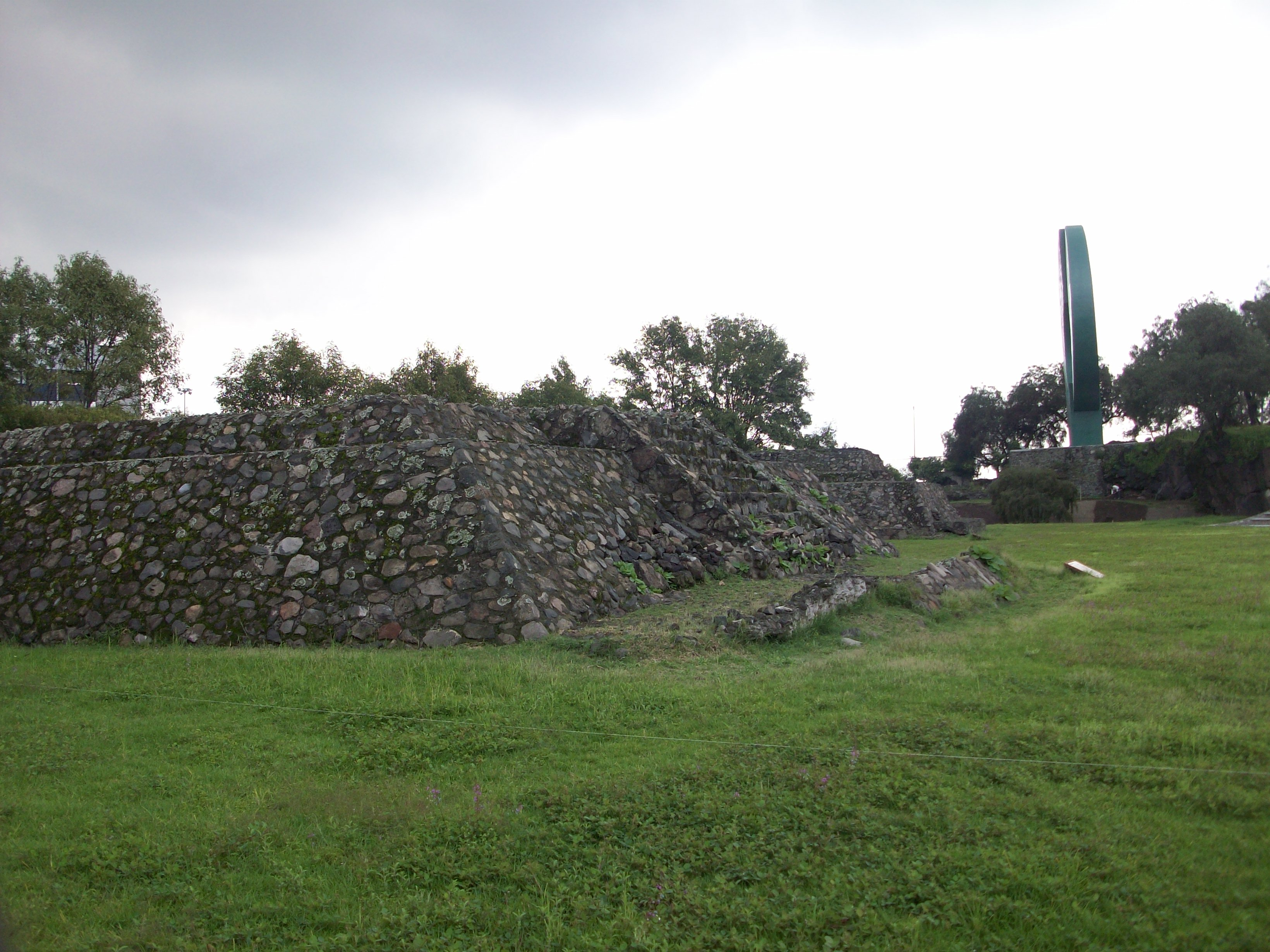
Remains of "Cuicuilco B" within the sport center, visible in the background the sculpture Disco Solar

Some of the reconstructed structures were incorporated into public spaces such as open-air theaters and green areas, creating a unique integration of modern architecture and archaeological heritage. These spaces were also used as part of the Cultural Olympiad of 1968.

== Location ==
The Villa is located in the Colonia Miguel Hidalgo in the Tlalpan borough in the southern part of Mexico City. Its location was deliberately chosen to ensure proximity to key Olympic venues. It lies near the archaeological site of Cuicuilco, along the "Route of Friendship", and is directly connected to Ciudad Universitaria and the Olympic Stadium via Avenida de los Insurgentes Sur.

== Villa Coapa ==
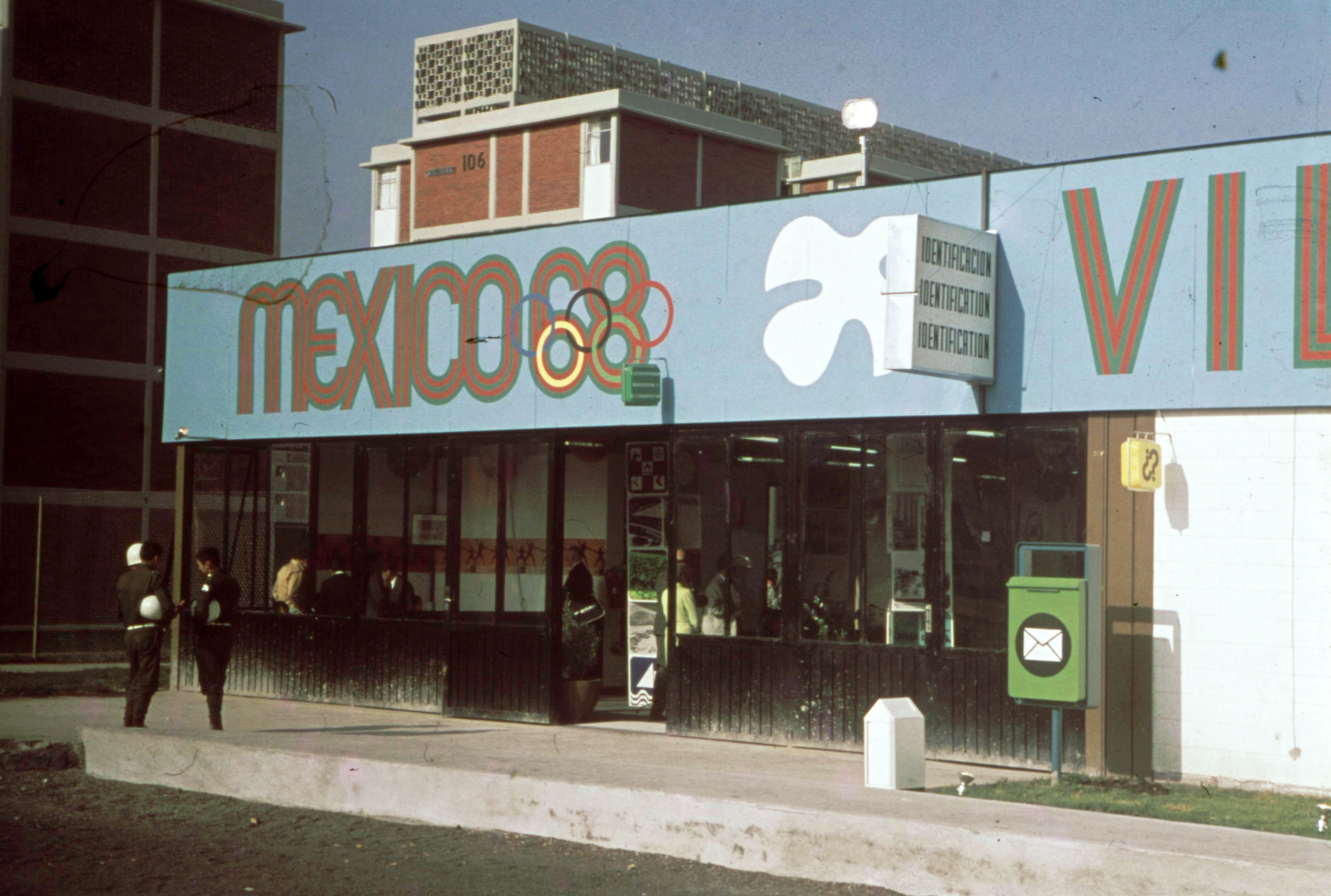
The entrance to the Coapa Village in 1968

In addition to the Villa Olímpica, a second residential complex, officially known as the Villa Cultural "Narciso Mendoza" (Note: Narciso Mendoza was an insurgent who fought under José María Morelos in the 1812 siege of Cuautla.) but more commonly referred to as Villa Coapa, was constructed for the Olympic Games. Located several kilometers away in the southeastern part of the city, it served as supplementary accommodation for officials, judges, cultural participants, and members of the press.

Villa Coapa was also designed as a self-sufficient unit. It included 686 houses and 470 apartments with a total of 3,474 rooms and offered family-type accommodations in low-rise buildings. The complex was divided into different sections assigned to specific user groups, including sports officials, participants in cultural programs, and media representatives.

Like the Villa Olímpica, Villa Coapa featured extensive infrastructure, including dining facilities, auditoriums, rehearsal spaces for cultural groups, medical services, and commercial areas. After the Olympic Games, the complex was also converted into a civilian residential community.

== Post-Olympic use ==
After the conclusion of the Olympic Games, the Villa was systematically transformed into a residential complex. The apartments were sold as private property (condominium), and the area developed into a gated community. Today, it officially bears the name Unidad Habitacional Villa Olímpica Libertador Miguel Hidalgo, although it is simply referred to as Villa Olímpica.

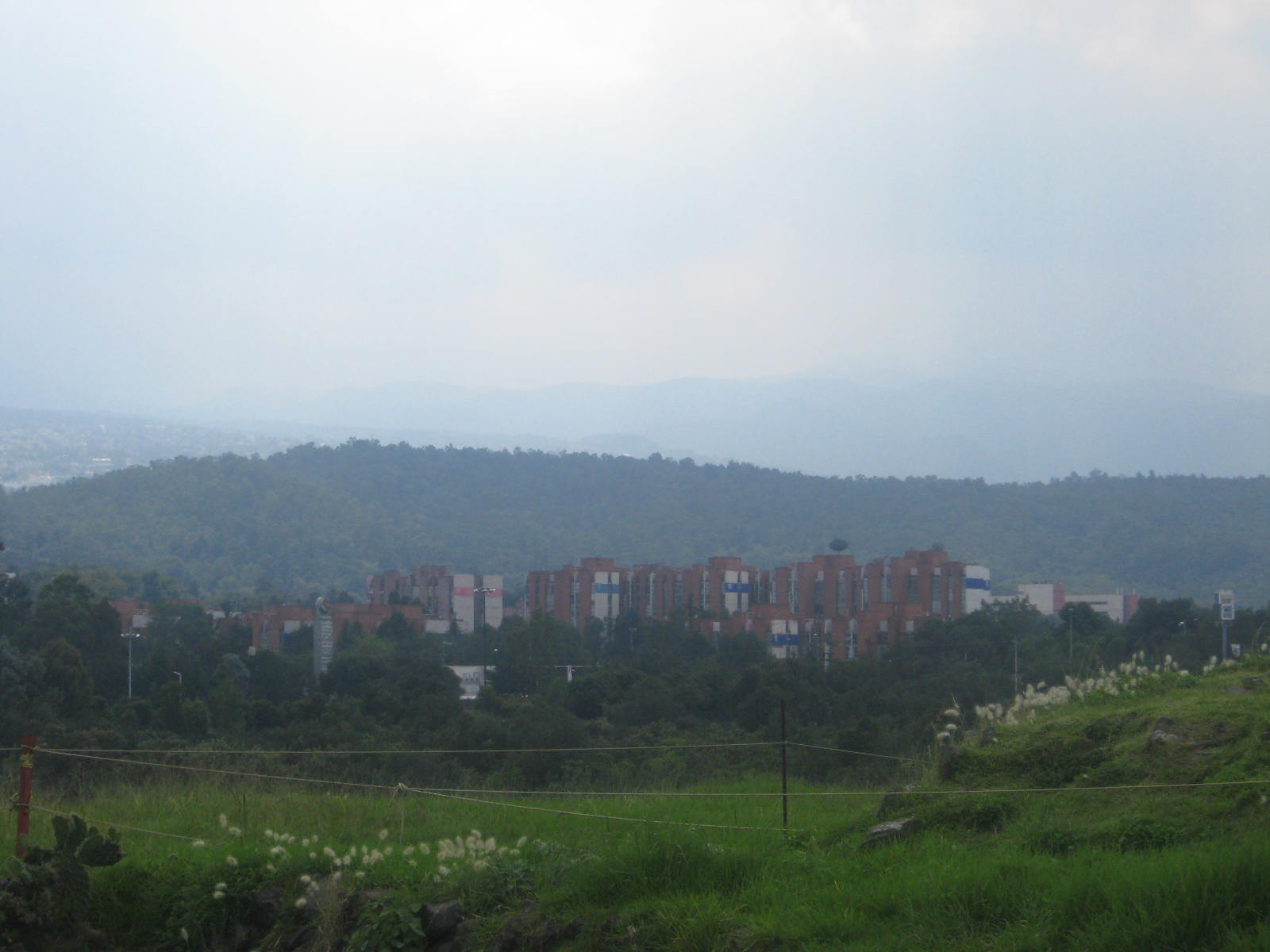
View of modern-day Villa Olímpica from the top of the pyramide of "Cuicuilco A"

The sports facilities are not part of the residence but have remained in use and are accessible to both residents and the general public. These include football and baseball fields, a running track, swimming facilities, and fitness areas.

== Public transport and landmark ==
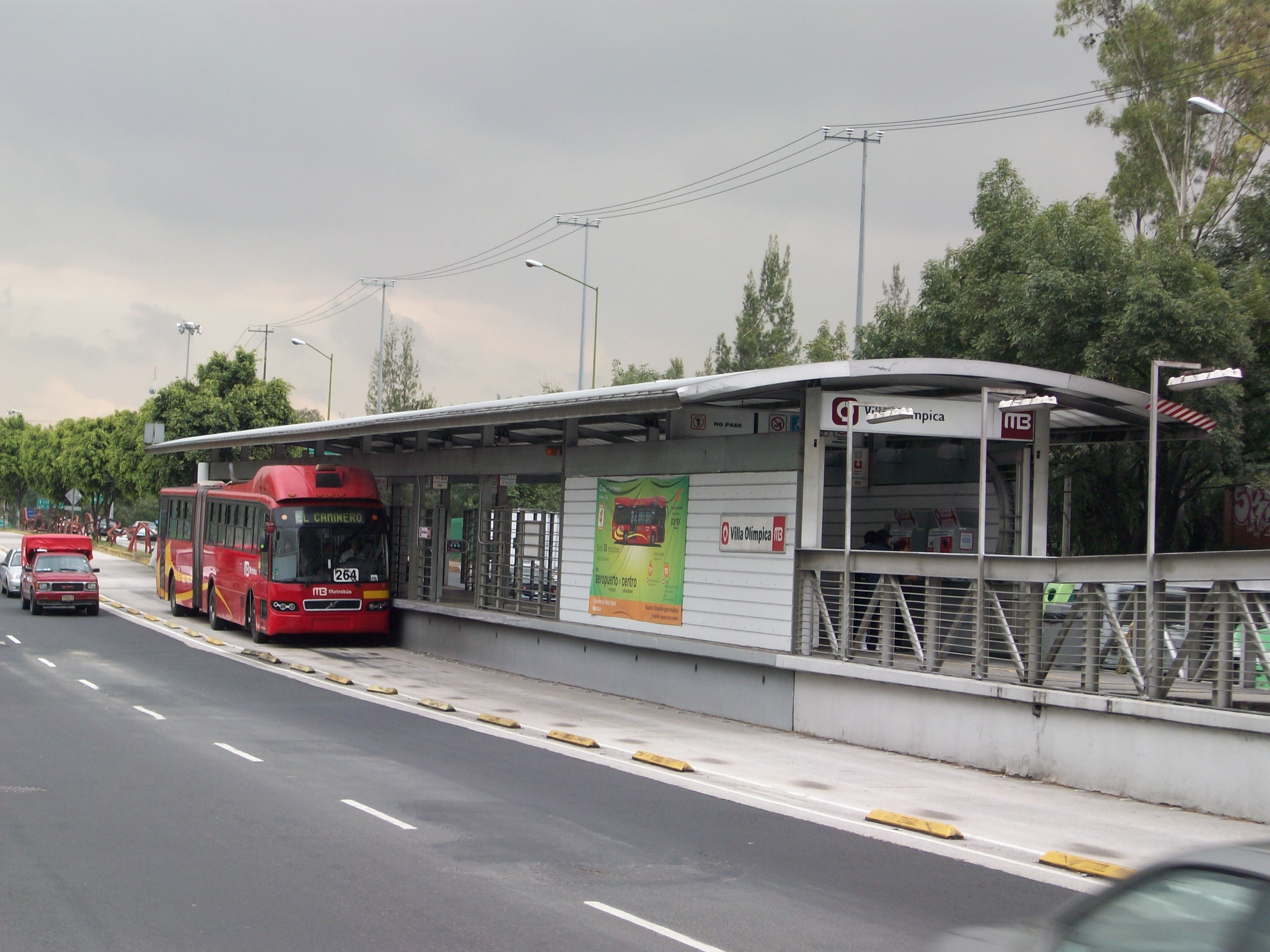
The station serving the area

In front of the complex is a station of Mexico City's Metrobús system, named Villa Olímpica, commemorating the site’s original purpose. The station’s icon depicts a prominent sculpture known as the “Solar Disc” (Disco Solar), a more than 17 m tall, dark green, circular artwork created by artist Jacques Moeschal for the Olympic Games at the entrance to the village. It remains one of the most recognizable landmarks in the area today.

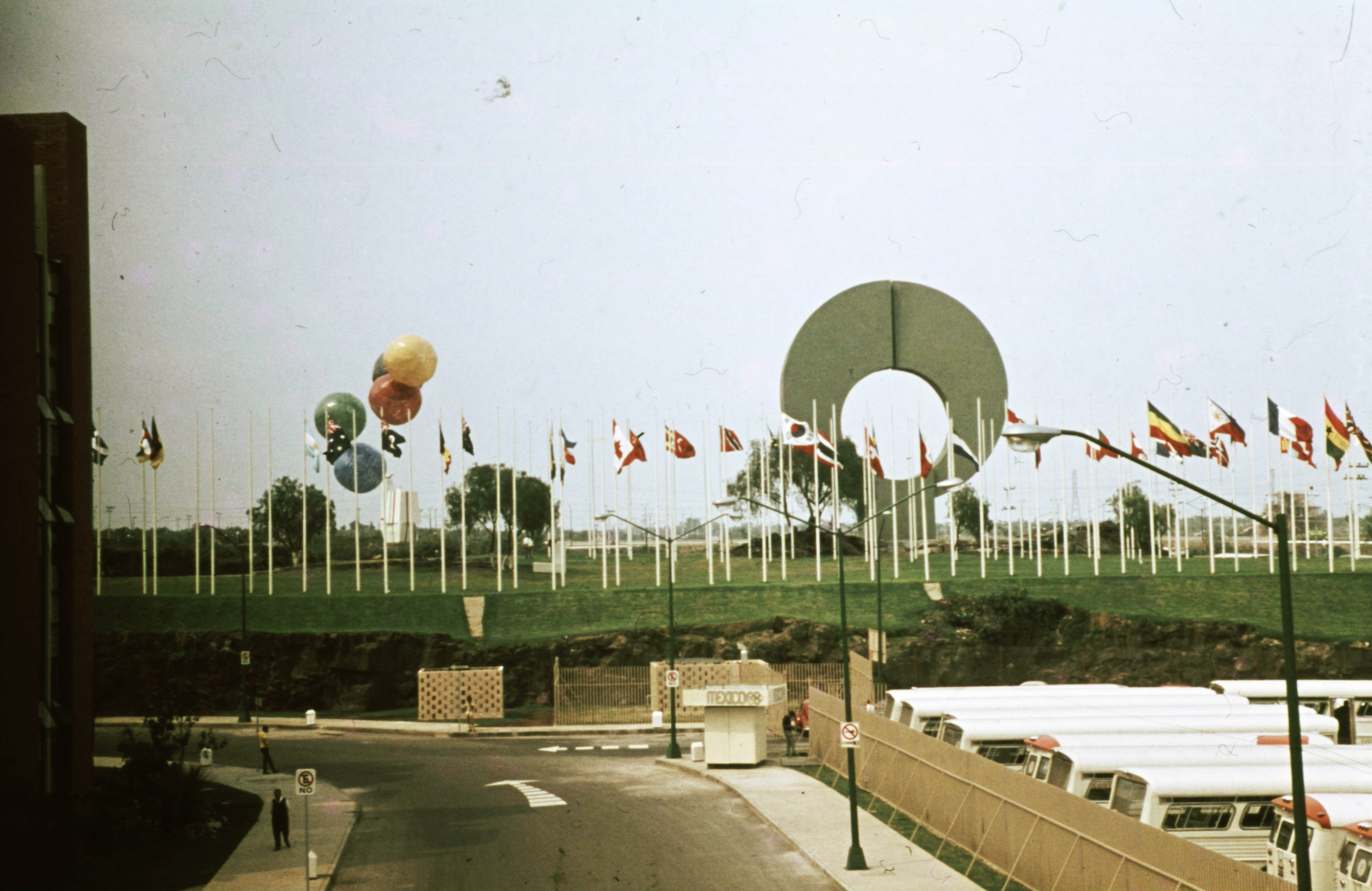
Disco Solar by Jacques Moeschal

== Bibliography ==
- José Rogelio Alvarez, MEXICO 68. Official Report of the 1968 Olympic Games. Produced by the Organizing Committee of the Games of the XIX Olympiad. Volume 1–5 (4+1 Official Souveniers[sic]), Mexico City 1969. (French/English, Spanish/German) Supplement: Volume 2b – Final report, Mexico City 1969. (Spanish)
- Organizing Committee of the Games of the XIX Olympiad, MEXICO 68: The Olympic Villages. Official Report of the 1968 Olympic Games. Volume 2 – The organization. Mexico City 1969, p. 187–242. (French/English)
- Organizing Committee of the Games of the XIX Olympiad, MEXICO 68: Villas Olímpicas. Official Report of the 1968 Olympic Games. Supplement: Volume 2b – Final report. Mexico City 1969, p.99–125. (pdf archived 05.03.2016, Spanish)
