= Jacques Moeschal =

Jacques Moeschal may refer to:

- Jacques Moeschal (footballer) (1900–1956), Belgian international footballer
- Jacques Moeschal (architect) (1913–2004), Belgian architect and sculptor
