= Héctor Velázquez Moreno =

Mexican architect (1922–2006)

- Born: 25 December 1922; Tampico, Tamaulipas
- Died: 2006 (aged 83–84)
- Education: Faculty of Architecture, Harvard University, Massachusetts Institute of Technology
- Occupation: Architect

Héctor Velázquez Moreno (born Mexico City, 1922 – died 2006) was a Mexican architect.

== Biography ==
Velázquez studied at the Faculty of Architecture of the Universidad Nacional Autónoma de México (UNAM) after 1949, and afterwards at Harvard University and at the Massachusetts Institute of Technology. Due to a scholarship he was enabled to visit also the École nationale supérieure des Beaux-Arts in Paris.

In the 1950s, he designed together with notable architects the Ciudad Universitaria of the UNAM. He designed several religious buildings as well as accommodation and commercial buildings, also in other countries He co-designed the 1957 Plaza Jacaranda shopping center in the Zona Rosa, Mexico City, a hub for the city's fashion-conscious and artist scenes.

He was president of the Colegio de Arquitectos de la Ciudad de México (CAM) in the Sociedad de Arquitectos de México from 1963 to 1965. He was head of social housebuilding in the Distrito Federal de México, director of architecture and urban planning in the Secretaría de Obras Públicas and general commissioner of construction and redevelopment at the UNAM.

Together with Ramón Torres Martínez he founded the architecture bureau Torres y Velázquez Arquitectos y Asociados, and was co-founder of the Despacho de Arquitectos HV. S.A. de C.V. in 1990.

== Works ==
Source: Julieta Boy

- Pasaje Jacaranda, Zona Rosa, Mexico City, with (1957)
- New building of the National Lottery (Mexico) (1974)
- Villa Olímpica housing (1968)
- Conjunto San Juan de Aragón housing (1965)
- Postgraduate building of the Faculty of Medicine, National Autonomous University of Mexico (1995)
