= Ruta de la Amistad =

Sculpture trail in Mexico City

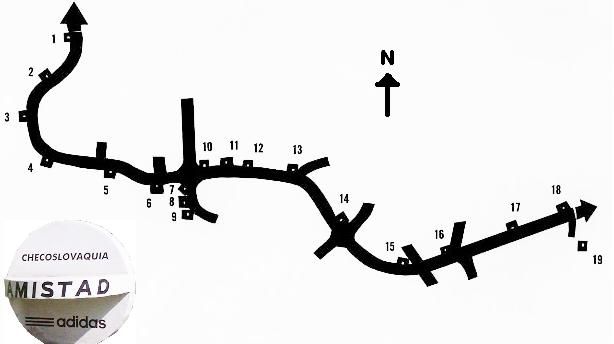
The route along Periférico

Ruta de la Amistad (English: Friendship Route) is a sculpture corridor in Mexico City located along the southern section of the Anillo Periférico highway. The route was inaugurated in 1968 as part of that year Summer Olympics, has a length of 17 kilometers and nineteen sculptures (also called stations) by artists from seventeen countries.

There are also three guest sculptures that are not located on the main route, but in three main venues of the Summer Olympics: El Sol Rojo by American Alexander Calder in the Estadio Azteca, Hombre Corriendo by Mexican Germán Cueto in the Olympic Stadium and Osa Mayor by Mathias Goeritz in the Palacio de los Deportes.

== History ==
Ruta de la Amistad was conceived by Mexican painter and sculptor Mathias Goeritz in 1967 as a public art project part of the 1968 Cultural Olympiad. The project was approved by architect Pedro Ramírez Vázquez, President of the Organising Committee of the Games of the XIX Olympiad in Mexico City. Construction happened in 1968 between 17 June and 1 August with the participation of 22 sculptors from seventeen countries.

After the 1968 Olympics the route was partially abandoned and subjected to vandalism. Some sculptures were removed from its original locations due to urban growth and infrastructure works, such as the enlargement of the Anillo Periférico highway. Patronato Ruta de la Amistad, a privately funded organization aimed to protect the route, was established in 1994 and has since helped to maintain and restore the sculptures.

== List of sculptures ==
=== Located on the route ===
Table featuring sculptures in the National Statuary Hall Collection
Station	Sculpture	Image	Country	Sculptor	Original location	Current location	Ref.
1	Señales (Signs)		Mexico	Ángela Gurría	San Jerónimo roundabout	Intersection of Anillo Periférico and Avenida de los Insurgentes	
2	El Ancla (The Anchor)		Switzerland	Willi Gutmann	Anillo Periférico and Luis Cabrera Avenue	Intersection of Anillo Periférico and Avenida de los Insurgentes	
3	Las Tres Gracias (The Three Graces)		Czechoslovakia	Miloslav Chlupáč	Pedregal	Intersection of Anillo Periférico and Avenida de los Insurgentes	
4	Sol (Sun)		Japan	Kiyoshi Takahashi	Anillo Periférico and Camino Santa Teresa	Intersection of Anillo Periférico and Avenida de los Insurgentes	
5	El Sol Bípedo (The Biped Sun)		Hungary	Pierre Székely	Anillo Periférico and Paseo del Pedregal		
6	Torre de los Vientos (The Biped Sun)		Uruguay	Gonzalo Fonseca	Anillo Periférico and Zacatépetl Avenue		
7	Hombre de paz (Man of Peace)		Italy	Constantino Nivola	Miguel Hidalgo Olympic Village	Intersection of Anillo Periférico and Avenida de los Insurgentes	
8	Disco Solar (Solar Disc)		Belgium	Jacques Moeschal	Olympic Village and Cuicuilco		
9	Círculo mágico (Magic Circle)		United States	Todd Williams	Miguel Hidalgo Olympic Village		
10	Reloj solar (Sundial)		Poland	Grzegorz Kowalski	Intersection of Anillo Periférico and Avenida de los Insurgentes		
11	México (Mexico)		Spain	Josep Maria Subirachs	Intersection of Anillo Periférico and Avenida de los Insurgentes		
12	Janus		Australia	Clement Meadmore	Pedregal de Carrasco	Intersection of Anillo Periférico and Avenida de los Insurgentes	
13	Muro Articulado (Collapsible Wall)		Austria	Herbert Bayer	Anillo Periférico	Intersection of Anillo Periférico and Avenida de los Insurgentes	
14	Tertulia de Gigantes (Giants' Tertulia)		Netherlands	Joop Beljon	Intersection of Anillo Periférico and Viaducto Tlalpan		
15	Puerta de Paz (Door of Peace)		Israel	Yitzhak Danziger	Anillo Periférico and Mexico-Xochimilco Avenue		
16	Martine		France	Olivier Seguin	Tepepan		
17	Charamusca Africana (African Charamusca)		Morocco	Mohamed Melehi	Anillo Periférico Muyuguarda Avenue	Intersection of Anillo Periférico and Viaducto Tlalpan	
18	Sin título (Untitled)		Mexico	Jorge Dubon	Xochimilco		
19	Puertas al Viento (Doors to the Wind)		Mexico	Helen Escobedo	Xochimilco	Intersection of Anillo Periférico and Viaducto Tlalpan	

=== Located outside the route ===
Table featuring sculptures in the National Statuary Hall Collection
No.	Sculpture	Image	Country	Sculptor	Location	Ref.
1	El Sol Rojo (Red Sun)		United States	Alexander Calder	Estadio Azteca	
2	Hombre Corriendo (Running Man)		Mexico	Germán Cueto	Olympic Stadium	
3	Osa Mayor (Ursa Major)		Mexico	Mathias Goeritz	Palacio de los Deportes	

== See also ==
- Korean Friendship Pavilion, Mexico
