= Helen Escobedo =

Mexican sculptor (1934–2010)

- Helen Escobedo, 1960 photographed by Kati Horna
- Born: July 28, 1934; Mexico City, Mexico
- Died: September 16, 2010 (aged 76); Mexico City, Mexico
- Known for: Sculpture
- Spouses: Fredrik Kirsebom (m. 1957–1977) Hans-Jürgen Rabe (m. 1995)

Helen "Elena" Escobedo (July 28, 1934 – September 16, 2010) was a Mexican sculptor and installation artist. She has had her work displayed all over the world from Mexico, Latin America, the United States, and Canada to the United Kingdom, Germany, Israel and New Zealand.

Her career as an artist spanned for more than fifty years. It explores ecological and urban problems through land art. Her works are site-oriented and ephemeral.

== Early life ==
Escobedo was born on July 28, 1934, to a Mexican lawyer father and an English mother in Mexico City. She was educated in her home in a small neighborhood setting with her younger brother Miguel, taught by a French governess until the age of ten. At a young age, she learned ballet until she outgrew it. She was taught violin by Sander Roth, who at the time was a member of the world-famous Lener Quartet. Even though she became proficient with her violin skills, Escobedo eventually decided to switch to art.

== Education ==
At the age of 15 in 1949, she decided to enroll at the Mexico City College and attended art classes in the afternoon twice a week. At Motolinia University, she took art classes under an abstract sculptor, Germán Cueto where she experimented with many different materials. Impressed by her work, Professor John Skeaping, a British sculptor from the Royal College of Art, encouraged her to pursue sculpture. He offered her a one-year grant to study in London at his institution, where she attended eventually with a three-year scholarship. She studied under the guidance of Frank Dobson, Henry Moore, Jacob Epstein, Leon Underwood, and for a short time, Ossip Zadkine. In her second year, she wrote her thesis: Renoir and Degas: Two Impressionists in Sculpture.

She got her bachelor's degree in Humanities at Motolinia University in Mexico and her master's degree in Sculpture from the Royal College of Art in London, U.K. by 1954 at the age of 20.

== Career ==
Aside from sculptor, Escobedo was also a painter, printmaker, installation and performance, writer, lecturer, curator, and museum director during her lifetime.

Escobedo accepted the position be the head and served as director of the Museo de Arte Moderno and the Department of Museums and Galleries at the Universidad Nacional Autonoma de Mexico (UNAM) in 1960, where she worked until 1978, organizing exhibitions. As she worked as director, she continued her craft and completed commissions as well as exhibitions of her own work. She would go on to serve as the Director of the Museum of Modern art between 1982 and 1984. From 1985 to 1989, she worked as an art curator of the Museum of the UNAM, specializing in international exhibitions. Having left her directorial role in art administration, Escobedo decided to concentrate on her own work.

=== Exhibitions ===
Her first solo exhibition was held in 1956 at the Galeria de Arte Mexicano in Mexico City. It included her works made of bronze, drawings, and paintings. After marrying Fredrik Kirsebom, a Norwegian, they moved to Sweden where Escobedo spent two years learning about her new home and making some religious sculptures that would be shown in her second solo exhibition at the Galería de Arte Mexicano when she returned to Mexico two years later.

In 1968, Mathias Goeritz invited her to participate in the Ruta de la Amistad (Route of Friendship) for the XIX 1968 Summer Olympics in Mexico City, for which she made the sculpture called Puertas al Viento (Gateway to the Wind). The Route of Friendship was constructed to be an Olympic highway consisting of monumental sculptures made by selected artists. It was her first large-scale sculpture piece. In the same year, Escobedo set up an exhibition, self-produced and curated by Willoughby Sharp featuring fifteen large-scale environments made by many individual international artists.

When Escobedo mounted her Dynamic Walls exhibition, it traveled to different cities starting in Prague but eventually became lost on its journey to Rome. It reappeared in 1971 in poor condition that resulted in her method of creating temporary or ephemeral works at the location for a one-time installation rather than let her work travel and become ruined again. This would become her signature, known internationally, to create site-oriented ephemeral sculptures using materials that are available at or near the site.

Escobedo created a paper mural at the Galería Pecanins in Barcelona in 1973. The following year, she held another exhibit at the Museum of Modern Art and at this point, was also the director of the Department of Museums and Galleries.

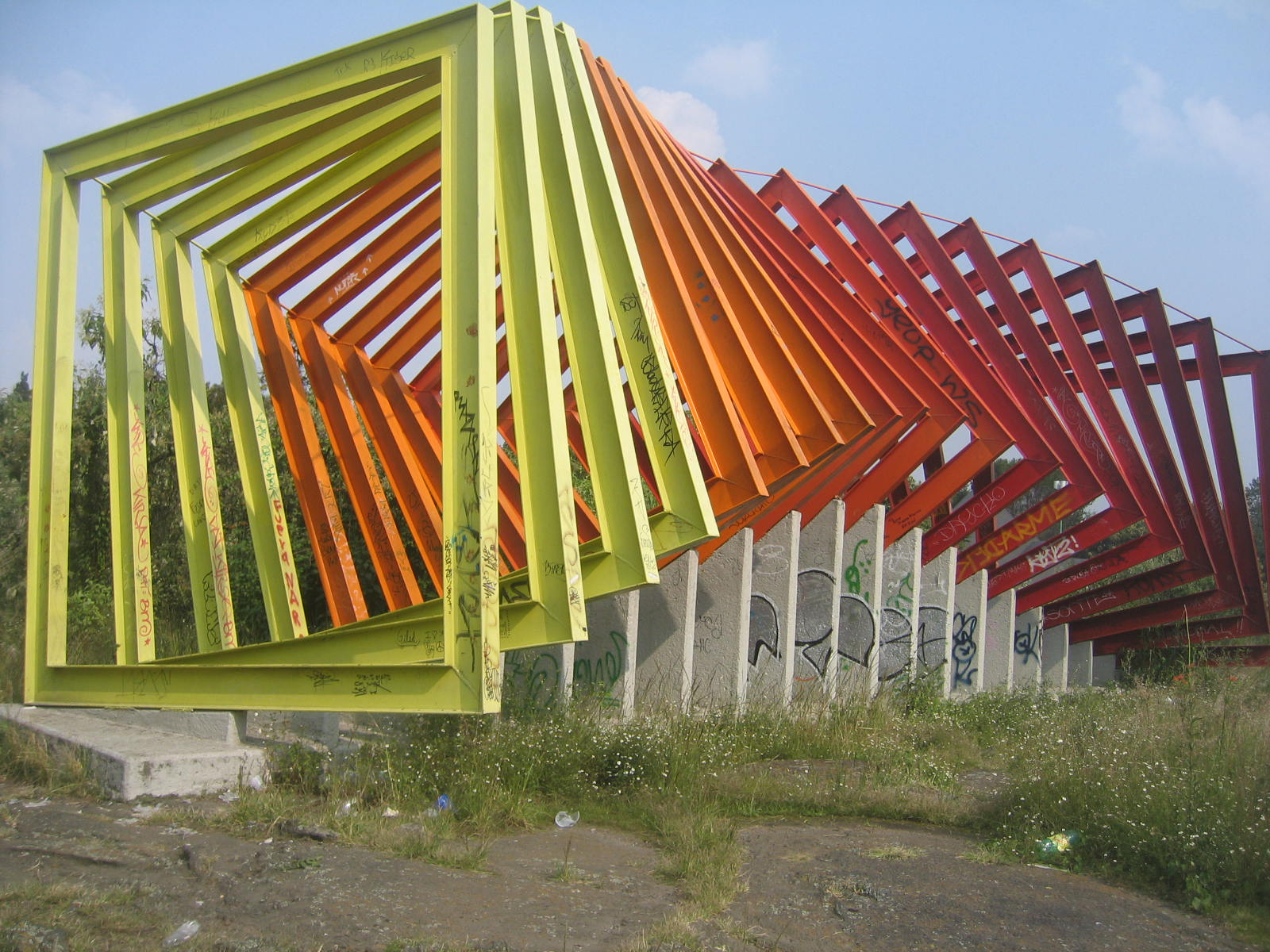
Coátl

In 1978, Escobedo created Coatl, at the University Cultural Center of UNAM in Mexico City, out of steel girders painted yellow to orange to red measuring to 15 meters.

As a statement, her exhibit called Negro basura, negro mañana (Black garbage, black tomorrow) in 1991 was made up of painted black garbage, three meters wide stretching at one hundred feet inside Chapultepec Park in Mexico City that lasted three days. As the years go by, she participated in many other exhibitions throughout the world.

Her next solo exhibition show was called Estar y no estar and was displayed at the University Museum in 2000. Two years later, she did three exhibitions, one in Mexico City called Salón Bancomer and the other two in Germany called Die Fluctlinge: The Refugees and Bicycle Taxi. The following year she returned to her home of Mexico City for her escasr Ríos Perenes exhibit.

Through 2007 to 2008, Escobedo continued her exhibitions in various locations with another in Germany as well as another four in Mexico. At Wakefield in the United Kingdom, she had a solo exhibition called Summer Field. In 2010, she would have her last solo exhibition in her home of Mexico City under her own name.

=== Awards ===
Escobedo competed in the UNAM sculpture competition and was awarded a prize in 1976. Entering with a small team of two other architects to design a building in 1980, they received the outstanding achievement Reaseguradora Patria for winning.

She was awarded the Guggenheim Fellowship for Creative Arts, Latin America & Caribbean in 1991. In 1999, she was awarded the FONCA creators’ grant.

=== Publications ===
Escobedo was also a writer whose works were published in public collections. She even conceived and coordinated a book in 1989 called Mexican Monuments: Strange Encounters that was printed in both Spanish and English that was met with equal success. It was her way of recording her Mexican heritage with the help of Paolo Gori. In 1999, she contributed an article entitled, “Work as process or work as product: a conceptual dilemma” to the compilation of Mortality Immortality?: The Legacy of 20th-century.

In 2004, Graciela Schmilchuk wrote a book filled with Escobedo's s installations called Helen Escobedo: Steps on the Sand with a prologue written by Dore Ashton.

== Later life ==
Escobedo had two children with Fredrik Kirsebom, Andrea in 1962 and a son, Michael in 1964. She obtained a divorce in 1977. Her mother died following the 1985 Mexico City earthquake. By 1987, Escobedo decided to split her year, six months at a time between living in Mexico and in Germany with her partner Hans-Jürgen Rabe whom she married in 1995. In 2003, Escobedo had a hip-bone replacement due to a sudden fall. Her first granddaughter was born as she celebrated her seventieth birthday in 2004. She lived in Mexico City, Sweden, Germany, Hamburg, and Berlin

On September 16, 2010, Helen Escobedo died in her hometown of Mexico City at the age of 76.
