= Pasaje Jacaranda =

Former shopping center in Mexico City

- Centro Comercial Plaza Jacaranda
- Location: Zona Rosa, Colonia Juárez, Cuauhtémoc, Mexico City
- Coordinates: 19.42530°N 99.16340°W
- Address: Génova, Londres and Liverpool streets
- Opened: 1959
- Demolished: After 1985, gradually
- Architect: Ramón Torres Martínez and Héctor Velázquez Moreno
- Num. of stores: 32
- Floor area: 4,000 m^{2} (43,000 sq ft)
- Floors: 1
- Parking: 150 (rooftop)

Pasaje Jacaranda (also Pasaje Jacarandas), officially Centro Comercial Plaza Jacaranda and also called Plaza Jacaranda, Plaza Jacarandas or Plaza Comercial Plaza Jacaranda, was an open-air shopping center in the Zona Rosa in Mexico City's Colonia Juárez that opened in 1959. It was located along the east side of Génova street, between Londres and Liverpool streets, and designed by architects Ramón Torres Martínez and Héctor Velázquez Moreno. The project was published in the magazines Arquitectura México (1959) and Arquitectura of Madrid (1962). In 2008 architectural historian Louise Noelle of the UNAM called it a symbol of the Mexican architecture of its time and of a way of life. Plaza Universidad (1969), anchored by Sears and Sanborns, is usually called the city's first shopping mall; some writers say that Pasaje Jacaranda was the first, an open-air center with no anchor store. Its heyday was the '60s and '70s, when the Zona Rosa was considered the hippest and most cosmopolitan district of the city. After that it declined, store by store, until it disappeared.

== Etymology ==
Jacarandas in bloom in Mexico City

Jacaranda mimosifolia is a common flowering tree in Mexico City. The plans called for a jacaranda in the central plaza.

== History ==
=== Development ===
Torres and Velázquez set up their firm, Torres y Velázquez Arquitectos y Asociados, in 1954. In the 1950s they went looking for a site for a shopping center like the ones being built abroad, and settled on the Zona Rosa. There they found four adjoining lots in a block on the southeast side of the Zona Rosa, near the intersection of Reforma and Insurgentes. Each lot was narrow and very deep, and so not profitable on its own. The architects proposed to the owners that they merge the lots into one shopping center, each owner keeping title to their own lot, so that their land would be worth much more once the pasaje was built. Pedestrian passages linked the three streets and met at a central plaza.

=== Design ===
The complex was single-story with a concrete structure, and covered about 4,000 m^{2} (43,000 sq ft). Arquitectos de México published a perspective drawing of the project in 1957, and Arquitectura México ran an article on it in its March 1959 issue (no. 65), with photographs by Guillermo Zamora. In 1962 Arquitectura, the magazine of the Colegio Oficial de Arquitectos de Madrid (Madrid's architects' association), also ran a piece on it, describing its open-air pedestrian passages and small interior plaza.

Parking was on the roof with a capacity for 150 cars, designed so that cars never blocked the stores, and people could walk through from one street to the next. The stores had full-height glass fronts, similar to Ludwig Mies van der Rohe's Farnsworth House and Crown Hall. The glass panels were custom-made and split by a horizontal bar at the height of the top of the doors. Tenants had to keep any advertising behind the glass and put their signs on a solid parapet along the top. Noelle writes that behind the continuous glass front, each tenant could give their store its own identity. It was the Zona Rosa's example of the International Style in a commercial building.

There were 32 stores, lined up along the party walls and flush with the street. The front of each store was at street level; the back had a sunken level (−1.20 m) and a mezzanine (+1.20 m). The Madrid magazine noted that these half levels below and above the sidewalk nearly doubled the retail area of each store, and that using the depth of the lots in this way gave more frontage for stores.

=== Tenants ===
The pasaje drew the city's young people; Noelle calls it a symbol of the social life of the period.

Restaurants included Le Bistrot, with French food and Art Nouveau decor, and Alfredo, which The New York Times called the best Italian restaurant in Mexico City. Alfredo's Sicilian-born owner liked to chat with diners on the terrace. La Trucha Vagabunda and the Toulouse-Lautrec café were also there, as well as La Cabaña.

The Toulouse-Lautrec had tables under colorful aluminum umbrellas. Its regulars included Mathias Goeritz, Carlos Monsiváis, José Luis Cuevas and Alejandro Jodorowsky. El Carmel, a café known for its Austrian pastries, drew Monsiváis, José Emilio Pacheco and Huberto Batis. It had a terrace on Londres Street and held poetry readings and shows by then-young artists Lilia Carrillo, Pedro Coronel and Manuel Felguérez.

Mathias Goeritz, German-born sculptor and painter

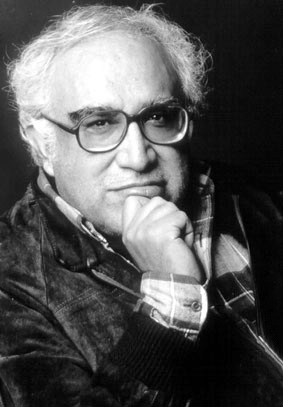
Carlos Monsiváis, writer and chronicler of Mexico City

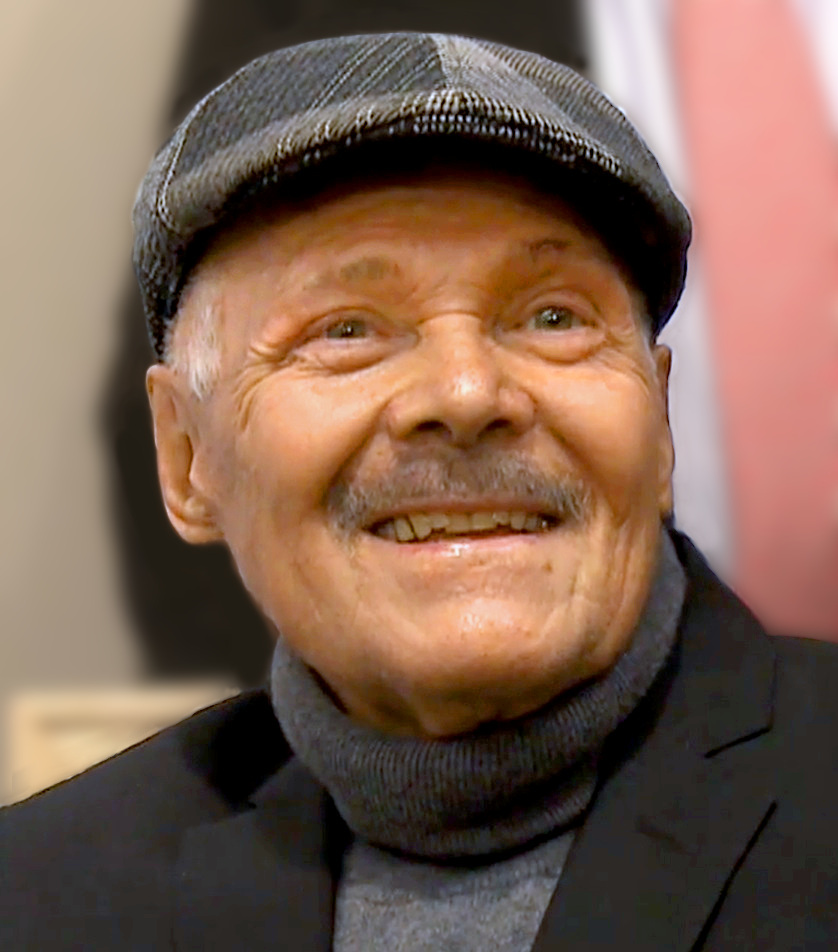
José Luis Cuevas, painter and printmaker

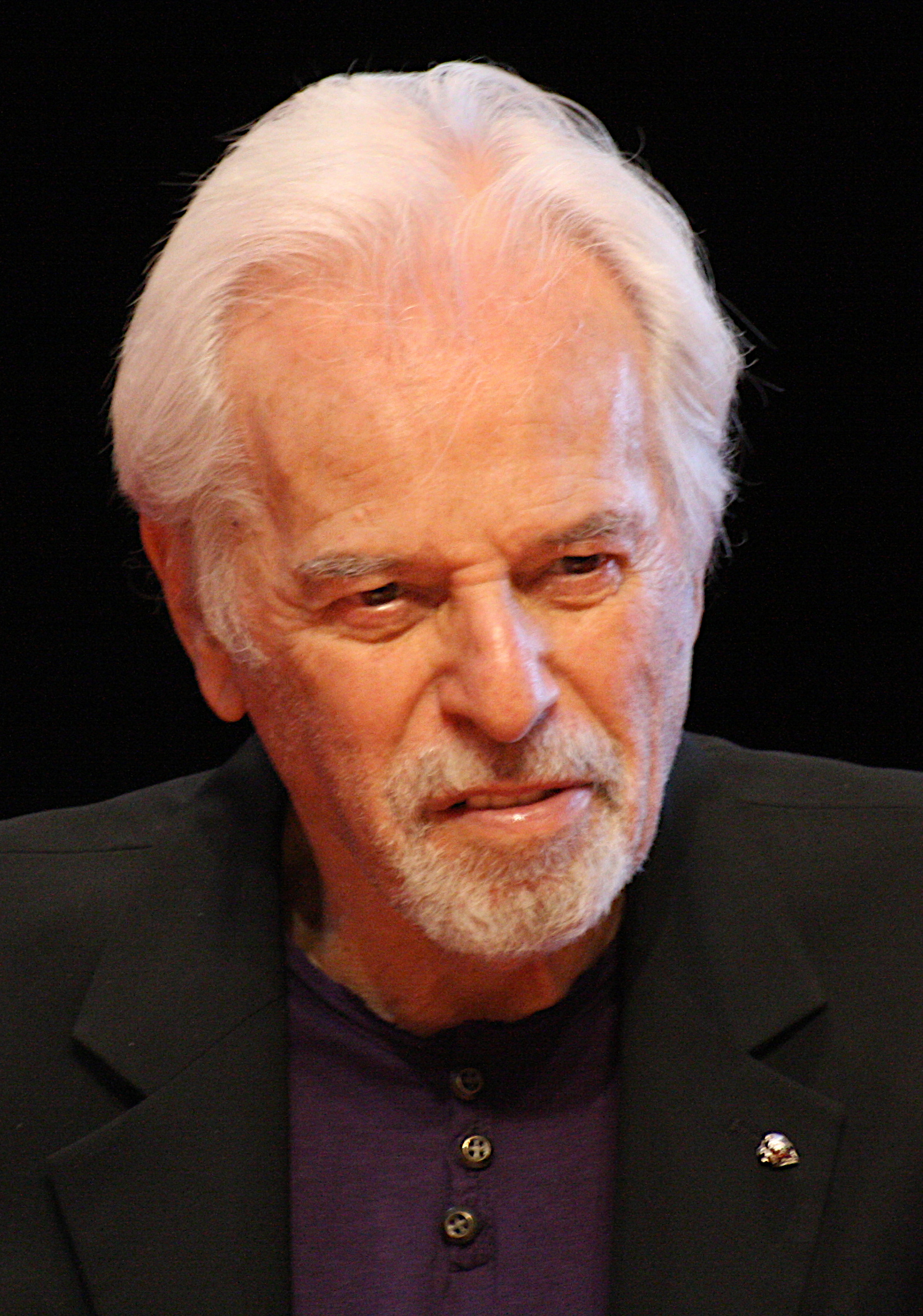
Alejandro Jodorowsky, filmmaker and comics writer

José Emilio Pacheco, poet and novelist

There were also bars such as La Llave de Oro, and nightclubs, the 2+2 and the Jacarandas, with orchestras and live bands. Alex Duval's Oso Blanco Gallery showed art on easels facing the windows. There were also furniture, jewelry and clothing stores, most of them selling Mexican-made clothes. Guadalajara jeweler Ernesto Paulsen had his workshop at the front of his store, where customers could watch work take place.

The record store Discos Zorba was located at one of the entrances. In the '70s and '80s it was one of the busiest record stores in the Zona Rosa and in the city. The Zona Rosa then had several stores selling imported records: Briyus and El Sonido Discoteque were also on Génova, and Hip 70 was in the Plaza del Ángel. El Universal gives Zorba's address as Liverpool 123. A customer of the early '80s remembered that the store was up a flight of stairs, and that it gave out plastic bags with blue stripes. Zorba was a chain that specialized in imported vinyl not found in ordinary stores. Writer Daniel Salinas Basave, who worked at its Interlomas branch (opened 1991), called the Zona Rosa store a "sanctuary" for music lovers. The chain no longer exists. A MixUp store later took over Zorba's space, at Génova 76.

=== In film and the press ===
The pasaje was a filming location for Las dos Elenas (1964), starring Julissa, directed by José Luis Ibáñez and based on a Carlos Fuentes story, and Jóvenes de la Zona Rosa (1970), starring Alberto Vázquez and directed by Alfredo Zacarías. The architecture magazines Calli, Arquitectura México and Arquitectos de México wrote about the pasaje, and Claudia, a women's magazine, ran ads for the center's stores with slogans like "Distinction in Modern Dresses".

=== Decline ===
Pasaje Jacaranda declined along with the Zona Rosa. Many blame the building of the Mexico City Metro, begun in 1967, which brought crowds of new, working-class foot traffic to the area. Chronicler José Joaquín Blanco wrote that once the Metro arrived, many Zona Rosa stores and restaurants fled to Polanco. Others tie the decline to the repression that followed the 1968 Tlatelolco massacre. After the 1985 Mexico City earthquake, many residents and workers left the Zona Rosa, and the buildings of the complex were torn down.

In Mexico City shopping center history, Pasaje Jacaranda was followed by Plaza Universidad (1969) and Plaza Satélite (1971), both by Juan Sordo Madaleno. Unlike the pasaje, they were closed off from the street, sat on major roads with big parking lots, and had anchor stores such as Sears and Sanborns.

=== Today ===
None of the buildings survive. By 2021, the site had a Carl's Jr., a KFC, a Circle K, and branches of Líneas, Tacontento and Salón Corona. A MixUp store, slightly above street level, was at that time likely the only reminder of the pasaje, standing where the parking lot used to be. The MixUp was in the space that had been Discos Zorba. It closed on February 15, 2025.
