= Cuicuilco =

Archaeological site in Mexico

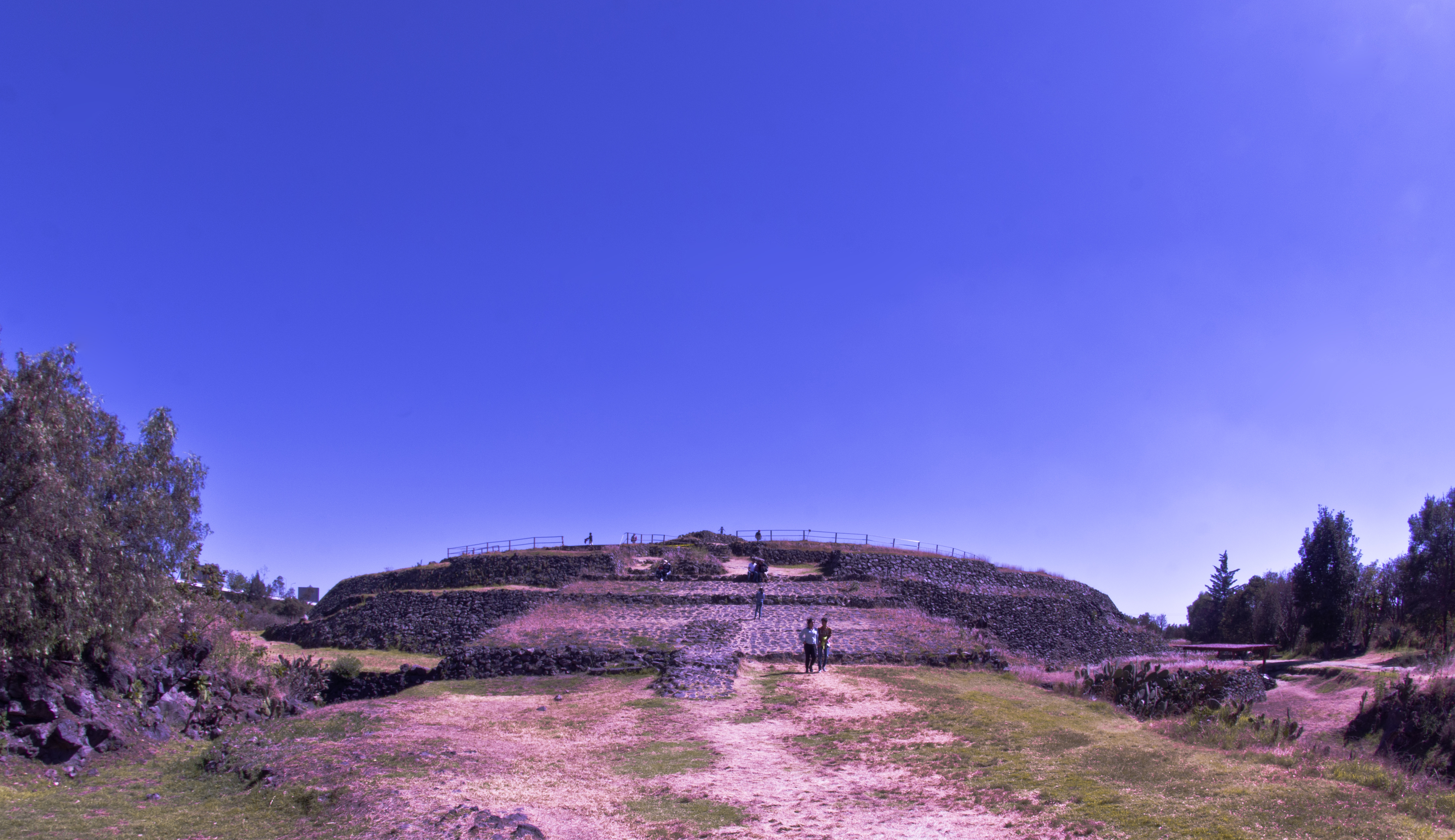
- Western side of the circular pyramid at Cuicuilco.

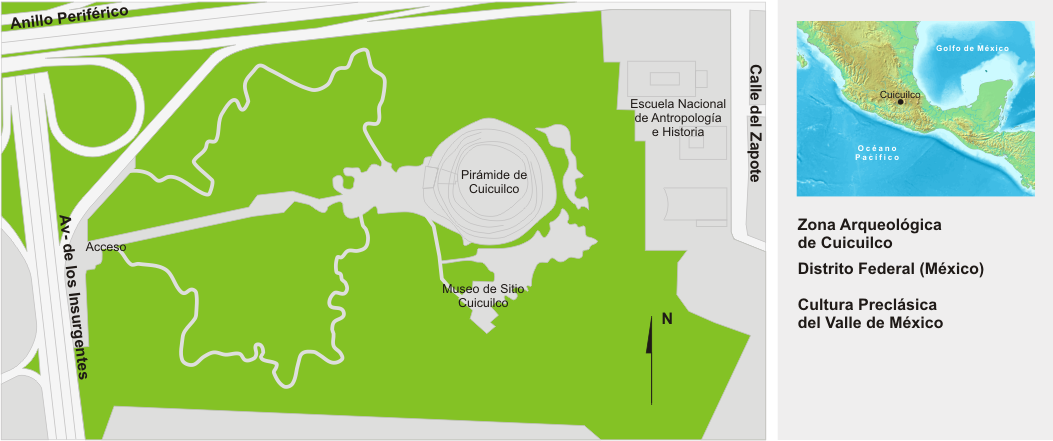

- Location within Mesoamerica
- 19°18′06″N 99°10′54″W
- Periods: Preclassic to Early Classic
- Location: Valley of Mexico, Mexico
- Region: Valley of Mexico

History
- Built: Around 1000 BCE
- Abandoned: 2nd–3rd century CE

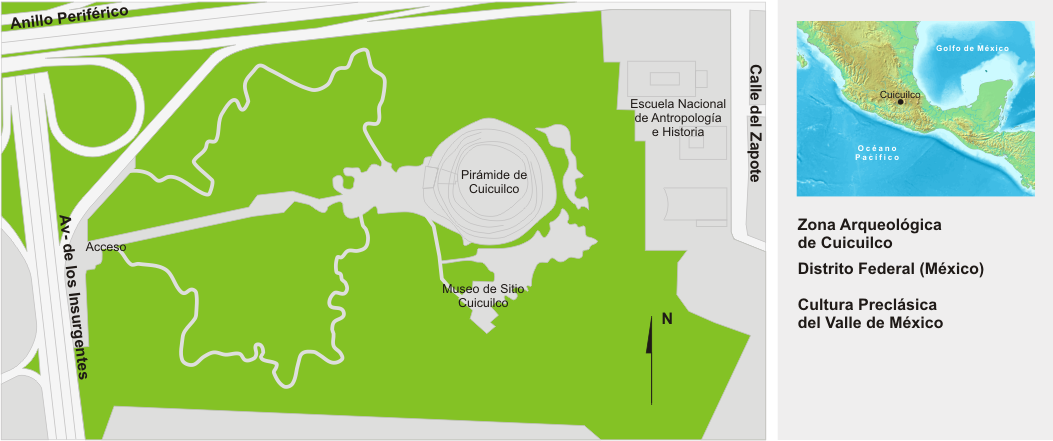
Map of the archaeological site

Cuicuilco is an archaeological site located on the southern shore of Lake Texcoco in the southeastern Valley of Mexico, in what is today the borough of Tlalpan in Mexico City.

Construction of the Cuicuilco pyramid began a few centuries BCE, during the Late Preclassic period of Mesoamerican history. The site was occupied until its destruction by the eruption of Xitle, sometime between 245 and 315 CE.

Based on its date of occupation, Cuicuilco may be the oldest city in the Valley of Mexico and was roughly contemporary with, and possibly interacting with, the Olmecs of Mexico's Gulf Coast region (also known as the Olmec heartland).

== Importance ==
Based on known facts, it was the first important civic-religious center of the Mexican Highlands, its population probably including all the social strata and cultural traits that would characterize the altépetl (city-state) of classical Mesoamerica.

Cuicuilco also represents one of the early sites in Mesoamerica to show state formation. There is evidence of a four-tier settlement hierarchy as well as having made investments in architectural projects. It became a rival of Teotihuacan which was also located in the Valley of Mexico (about 60 km to the northeast). Their interactions were mostly hostile and were characterized by both cities taking defensive positions against each other throughout the Valley of Mexico.

It was destroyed and abandoned following the eruption of the volcano Xitle, causing migrations and changes to the population and culminating in the consolidation of Teotihuacan as the ruler of the Central Highlands during the Early Classic period.

At the site are eight of the many housing and religious buildings that once existed and the remains of a hydraulic system that supplied water to the city. One of the pyramids was built in a strategic position, representing early prehispanic attempts to link religious concepts with cosmic events through building construction.

== Etymology ==
Though the etymology is unknown, according to Mexico's Instituto Nacional de Antropología e Historia (National Institute of Anthropology and History, INAH), American archaeologist and anthropologist Zelia Nuttall (1857–1933) believed that Cuicuilco means: “Place where songs and dances are made”.

== History ==
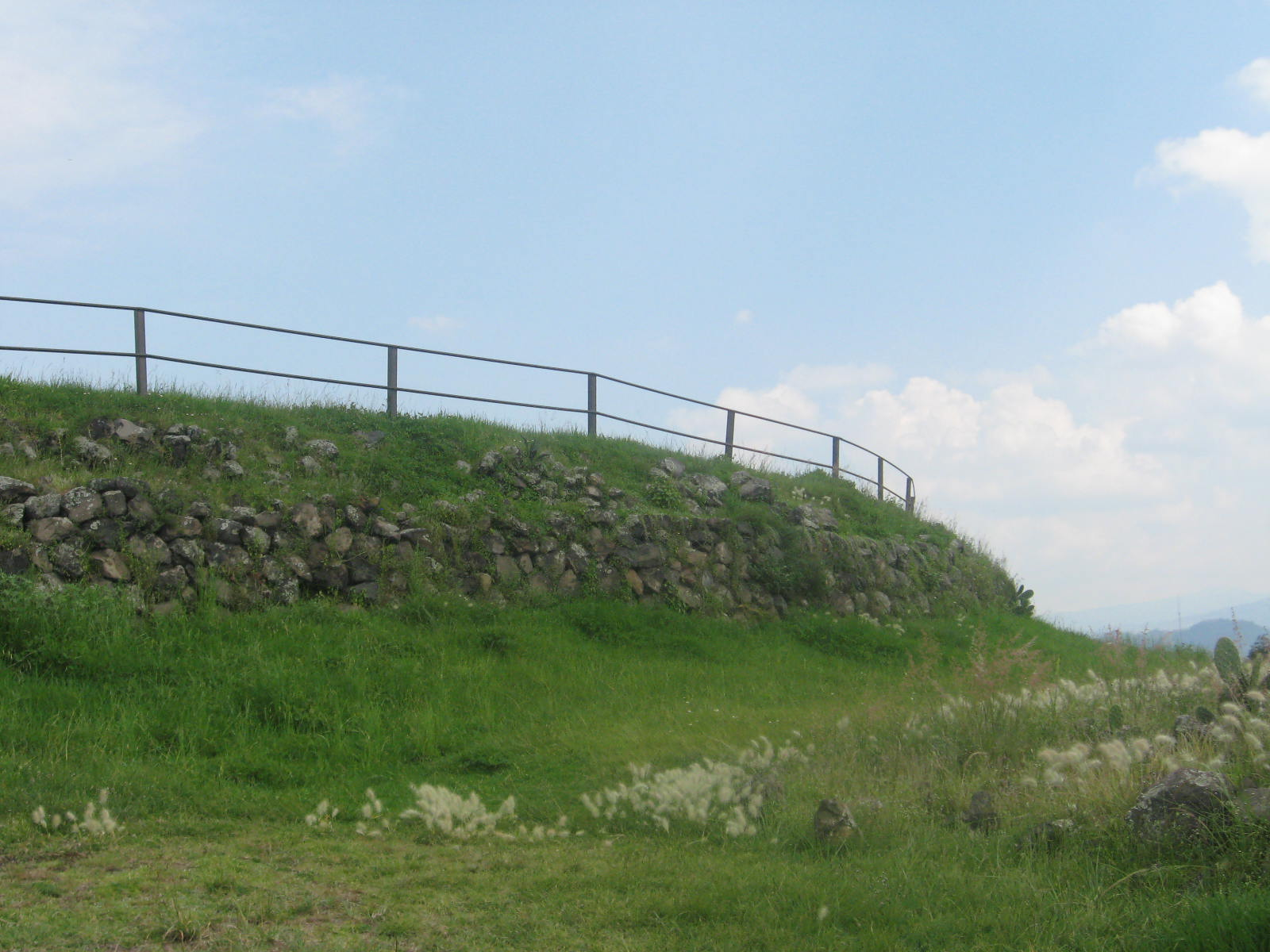
Top ring of the main pyramid as seen from stairs leading to top.

Cuicuilco was founded as a farming village, but provides evidence of early religious practices, including stone offerings and the use of ceramics as grave goods. The city grew around a large ceremonial center with pyramids and an associated urban area that included plazas and avenues bordering a series of small, shallow pools. These pools were fed by runoff from the nearby hills of Zacayuca and Zacaltepetl. The population at the city's peak is estimated at 20,000 people. The features of the site include terraces, various buildings, fortifications, and irrigation ditches and canals. The main known structure is a pyramidal basement built about 800–600 BCE.

Although this site produced a new ceramic tradition (around 600–200 BCE), it is considered that the overall site area was developed over several generations of inhabitants.

Archaeological evidence, ceramic and structures, indicate that Cuicuilco developed during the first millennium BCE, during the Preclassic, as a small settlement, its inhabitants interacting with other sites in the Basin of Mexico as well as relatively distant regions, e.g. Chupicuaro to the west and Monte Albán southeast.

Estimated occupation periods for Cuicuilco may be considered tentative at best. The earliest occupation is estimated in 1200 BCE, and included many farming villages of similar configuration and space distribution. During the period 1000–800 BCE, conical structures with an oval base were built. Specialists call these sites regional capitals, considering that they had higher hierarchy and functioned as integration centers, eventually becoming larger regional capitals.

If the great pyramid of Cuicuilco is an expression of this growth, then this level of development was reached between 800 and 600 BC, when it was built. If true, these proto-urban characteristics might have extended into the late Preclassic, with Cuicuilco weakening between 100 BCE and 1 CE, the time when Teotihuacan began to develop, later becoming an important urban center in the Classic period.

=== Beginning of the culture ===
In the mid-Preclassic (c. 800 BCE), settlements emerged in the area, which slowly evolved and grew, becoming cities, subsequently developing into a major civic-ceremonial urban centers in the late Preclassic (c. 100 CE). With twenty thousand inhabitants, complex ritual systems, and social stratification, comparable to Teotihuacan during the Late Formative period.

Some experts theorize that the development of the site, from its foundation, was due to its strategic location near the pass of Toluca, and near the shores of Lake Texcoco.

Under this perspective, although the place produced (around 600–200 BCE) a new ceramic tradition, is also evident that the region was configured by successive generations.

=== Culture growth ===
Towards the late Preclassic period, around 150 BCE, Cuicuilco became an urban regional center, with a population estimated at 20,000 inhabitants, comparable with Teotihuacan at that time (cf. Sanders, 1981). Cuicuilco's development was affected by the eruption of the Xitle volcano, which formed a layer of lava that partially or completely covered the city's structures, whose extension is inferred to have reached nearly 400 hectares (cf. ibid.).

=== Physiological characteristics of the culture ===
The inhabitants had round heads affected by direct or oblique tubular cranial deformation, the first being more common. Dental mutilation was practised. The average life span was 51 years, affected mainly by diseases like osteomyelitis.

=== Agriculture and food ===
From their location, inhabitants had access to natural resources, as they were located approximately 4 km from Lake Xochimilco, and near the Sierra de las Cruces and Ajusco (cf. Sanders 1981: 173); In addition there were water springs and streams. Prehispanic groups managed to produce food. The economic base was centered on agriculture, probably supplemented by hunting, fishing and gathering; access to wood had to be simple, from nearby forests, and agricultural land in the vicinity of the nuclear portion of the site, buried today under meters of volcanic lava and modern buildings.

=== End of the culture ===
The decline began in the early 1st century BCE, with the rise of Teotihuacan as a center of cultural and religious influence. By the year 400 CE, the Xitle volcano, located in the vicinity of Ajusco (Nahuatl: atl, xochitl, co, “water”, “flower”, “place”; “place of flowers in water”), and part of the Sierra de Ajusco-Chichinauhtzin, erupted, burying and destroying what still remained of Cuicuilco and Copilco (another important ceremonial center). This disaster led to the dispersion of Cuicuilca culture towards Toluca and Teotihuacan, which hosted a large part of the Cuicuilcas and incorporated many features of their culture.

It is considered that Cuicuilco's decline (100 BCE to 1 CE) had a minor recovery in 1–150 CE, due to the presence of representations of fire deities.

Also, according to some other sources, a series of volcano eruptions and the destruction of Cuicuilco took place in the 1st century BC.

In spite of the abandonment of Cuicuilco as an important ceremonial center, people continued making offerings even after the site was covered by lava from the Xitle volcano, which happened around 400 CE or in the range 245 to 315 AD.

With Cuicuilco in ruins, Xitle erupted once again, covering much of the city in lava. This lava flow is evident based on excavation around the main pyramid. Excavations show a layer of lava separating the modern surface from the original, ancient surface. This shows much of the city was completely destroyed by the lava flows. This series of eruptions gave rise to Teotihuacan as the center of the Basin of Mexico.

From the beginning of the last century, “El Pedregal” was an attractive place to define the predecessor cultures of the Teotihuacan y Mexica cultures in the México basin. Investigations at Cuicuilco B demonstrated that the site's development was as a consequence of internal dynamics.

Archaeologists conclude that Cuicuilco was a prominent community prior to the emergence of Teotihuacan as an urban center, noting that the six small communities which some archeologists believe eventually combined to become Teotihuacan were founded and showing evidence of modest growth at the same time that Cuicuilco was building pyramids and public monuments. The city seems to have been abandoned around AD 150 to 200 after the eruption of a nearby volcano, Xitle, although the territory was reoccupied at a much later date. Pottery and other evidence suggest that refugees from the volcanic disaster migrated north and became part of the population pool of Teotihuacan, near the northern shore of the Lake Texcoco.

== Archaeological site ==
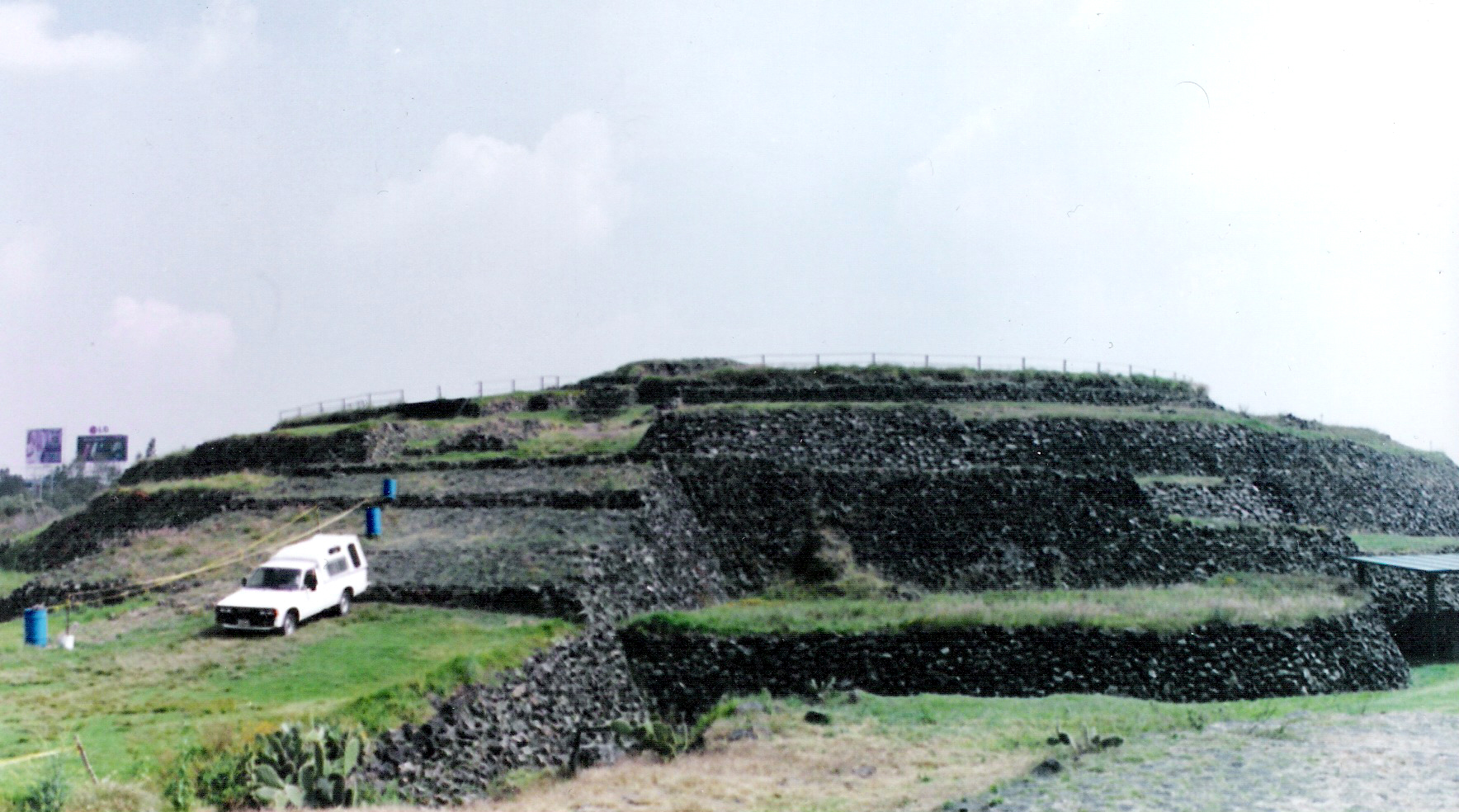
Front part of the pyramid of Cuicuilco

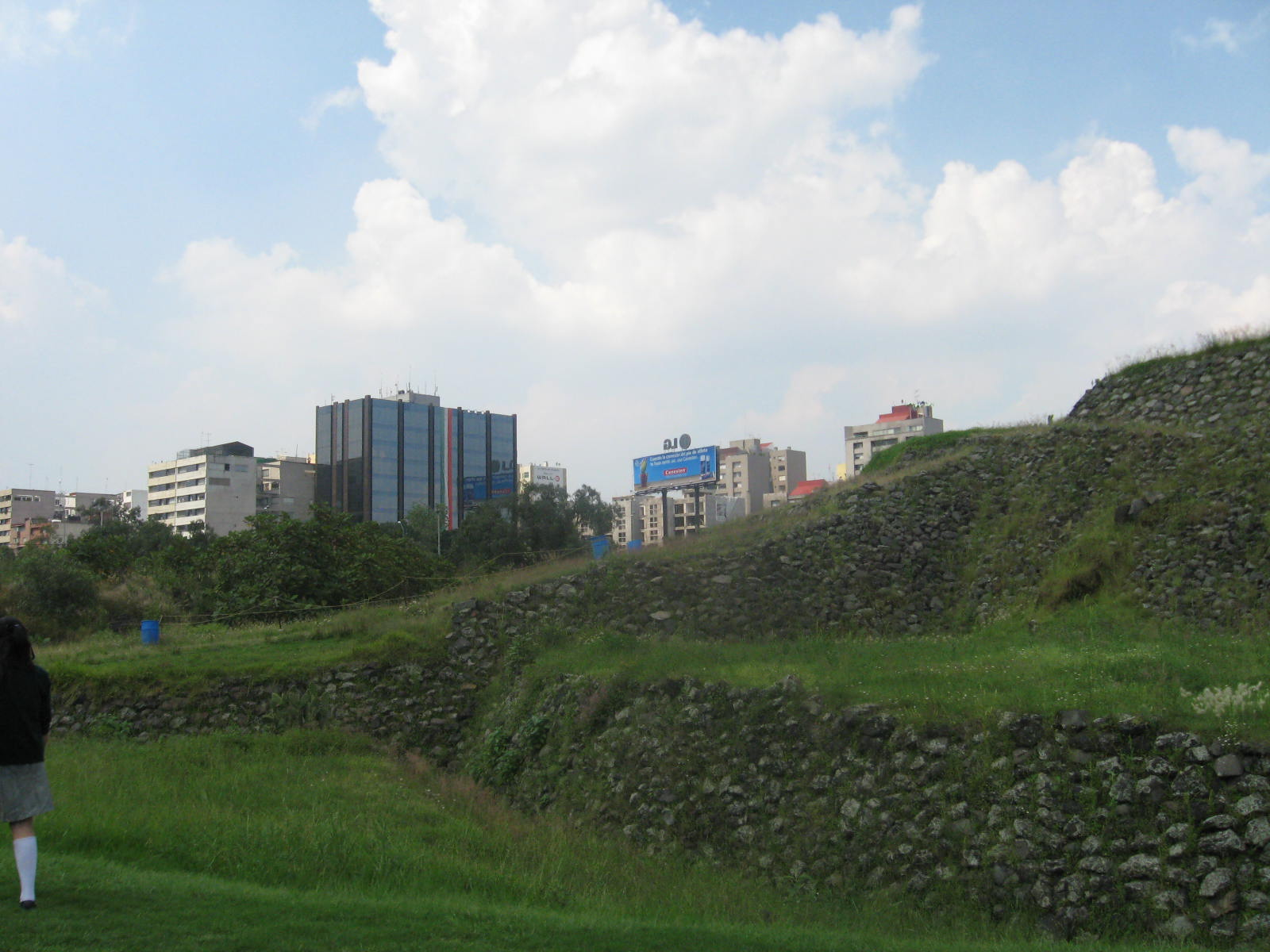
Stairway portion of the Cuicuilco pyramid with modern buildings of the Coyoacán borough in the background

The site of Cuicuilco is covered by a dense volcanic lava field known as the Pedregal de San Ángel. The lava covers an area of approximately 80 km^{2}, including the foothills of the Ajusco mountain range and extending down to a nearby lake shore. A 1956 study concluded that the uneven lava deposits, reaching a depth over 10 m in areas, were a major factor in the preservation of Cuicuilco. The site is also inside a modern urban area, and is partially covered by buildings associated with the National University of Mexico. Only partial archaeological investigation has been possible, and modern building techniques have damaged the prehistoric city. Several 1990 archaeological finds at Cuicuilco, consisting of a circular pyramid constructed within a plaza with smaller structures associated with the agricultural system, were destroyed for the construction of a multi-storied office complex. Consequently, the true size and complexity of Cuicuilco may be difficult to ascertain.

=== Other investigations ===
The prehispanic settlement and its surroundings, upon being covered by lava, were sealed and preserved. Archaeological materials above the lava were affected differently during the last 2000 years.

The lava flow sealed off the northern shore of the lake and appears to have created a marshy peat deposit in the eastern section. Multiple layers of volcanic ash from Xitle and possibly from Popocatepetl have been detected in the peat.

It has also been suggested that other volcanoes in the area may have played a role.

"No geological evidence under the Xitle flow suggests an earlier eruption, but another monogenetic volcano, Chichinautzin, was also active in the area prior to Xitle and is believed to have had a similarly large flow and to have resulted in similar ecological changes. The Yololica volcano also erupted at about the same time as Xitle, and its lava flows are only a few kilometers from Cuicuilco".

During Byron Cummings' 1922–1925 exploration, ceramics were found from phases preceding the eruption. Eduardo Noguera (1939) excavated burials in the proximity of the pyramidal sector known as Cuicuilco A, corresponding to the preclassical archaeological site. In 1957, investigations by Heiser and Bennyhoff provided relevant information to refine the chronological sequence of the main building basement (cf. Schávelzon, 1983)

Between 1966 and 1968, important complexes of architectural structures were found as well as a series of conical formations, a group called Cuicuilco B, where more than 300,000 ceramic pots were rescued (Müller, 1990). Based on analysis of archaeological ceramics of Cuicuilco B, Florence Müller determined that the occupation of the settlement continued after the Xitle eruption, during the Classical, Epiclassical, postclassical periods until the Spanish conquest, even though the importance of the site as well as the number of inhabitants dropped radically.

In 1990, in the sector known as Cuicuilco C, Rodríguez identified predominant preclassical ceramic materials, as well as, to a lesser extent, pots from later periods, including colonial and modern (Rodriguez, 1994).

Stratigraphy has determined that, after the Xitle eruption, materials were deposited on a layer of lava cushions associated with a body of water, which demonstrate the presence of settlements or villages from approximately 200 to 950 CE, according to the preliminary analysis of ceramic layer

Features of archaeological materials allow inferring the context of the natural and cultural training processes. Inhabitants discarded vases and fragments in the vicinity of the body of water, and many pots were trapped in the lava, especially domestic pieces such as pans, pots, pitchers, dishes, boxes and comales, even if it does not preclude the possibility that at the end of the life of these vessels, they were simply thrown into the water, considered as trash. On the other hand, the presence of braziers fragments, miniature pieces and Tlaloc vases indicates that these were thrown into the water as offerings as part of rites similar to those recorded by Spanish chroniclers as Sahagún (1989) and Duran (1967) in the twin cities of Tenochtitlan and Tlatelolco as well as in other settlements in late postclassical Mexico.

Many ceramic materials identified in the preliminary analysis correspond to phases of Teotihuacan's apogee during the classical period (Tlamimilolpa and Xolalpan phases), between 200 and 650 CE. According to recently adjusted chronology based on radiocarbon dating (cf. Rattray, 1991); predominant types are temporarily located in the epiclassical period, 650-950 CE, Coyotlatelco tradition (cf. Rattray, 1966), and are contemporaneous with the Tula Chico occupation (cf. Cobean, 1990), as well as other important settlements in the Valley of Mexico, as Cerro de la Estrella and Azcapotzalco (altepetl). There are also materials, although in low percentages, whose production and consumption starts in the epiclassical (based recent research made in the Tula region) but have been associated with the Tula apogee. According to ethno-historical sources and some radiocarbon dating, it is located chronologically between 950 and 1150 CE. (cf. Cobean, 1990)

These archaeological materials indicate strong social interaction between the Valley of Mexico and other regions under the hegemonic power of Teotihuacan, as well as the conformation of sociopolitical units after the decline of said Empire, also as evidence of socio-economic aspects associated with the emergence of the Toltec State.

It is a restricted area where deposits were affected by activities of the 20th century, fragments found of Aztec ceramics from the end of the late postclassical, materials of the colonial period (native and Spaniards) as well as 19th-century European fine earthenware. This material provides evidence of a settlement or village in Cuicuilco from the Tepaneca-Aztec empire, before the Spaniards' arrival, continuing the occupation of land owners such as Bernal Díaz del Castillo and other.

== Current situation ==
Due to its location, Cuicuilco is in a difficult situation. Among the issues are modern planning and economic interests of the place, as well as disputes on conservation and legislation of the archaeological heritage.

Known Cuicuilco is divided into two zones. The first is known as Cuicuilco A, where the ceremonial center is located. The other is called Cuicuilco B and lies West of Cuicuilco A, in the Olympic village Sports Centre.

Its importance is recognized by all historians and archaeologists; however it has barely been studied, especially when compared with other archaeological sites, such as Teotihuacan and Tula. The main investigation obstacle is that the area is covered almost entirely with a lava layer of about 9 to 10 meters thick. This difficulty is compounded by urbanization of the area, with constructions directly above the archaeological site, such as the Telmex building and the Cuicuilco commercial Plaza in 1997.

The existing Cuicuilco Site Museum is the design of renowned Mexican architect Luis Macgregor Krieger.

== Other photos ==
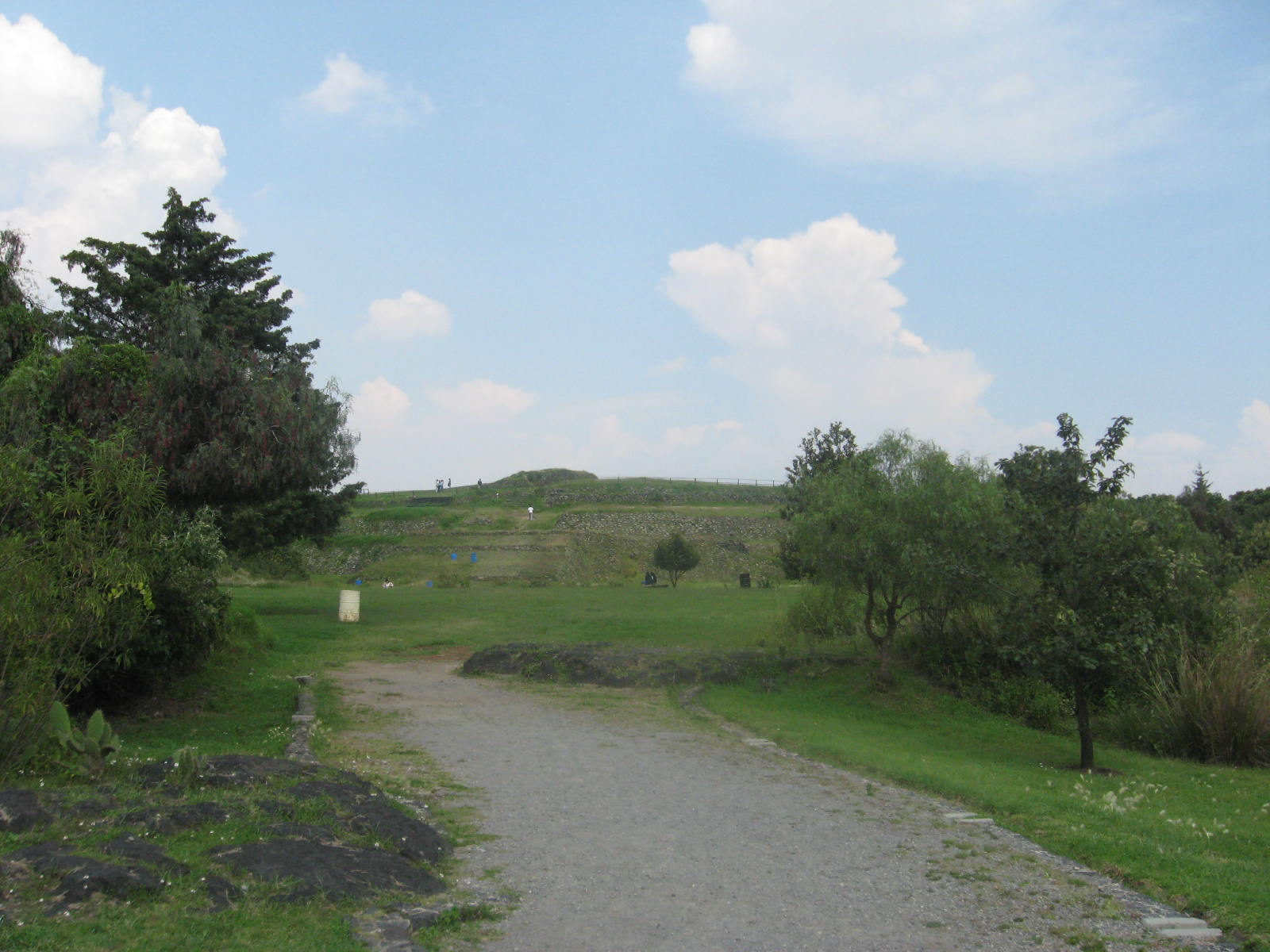
Path and stairs leading up the main pyramid of Cuicuilco

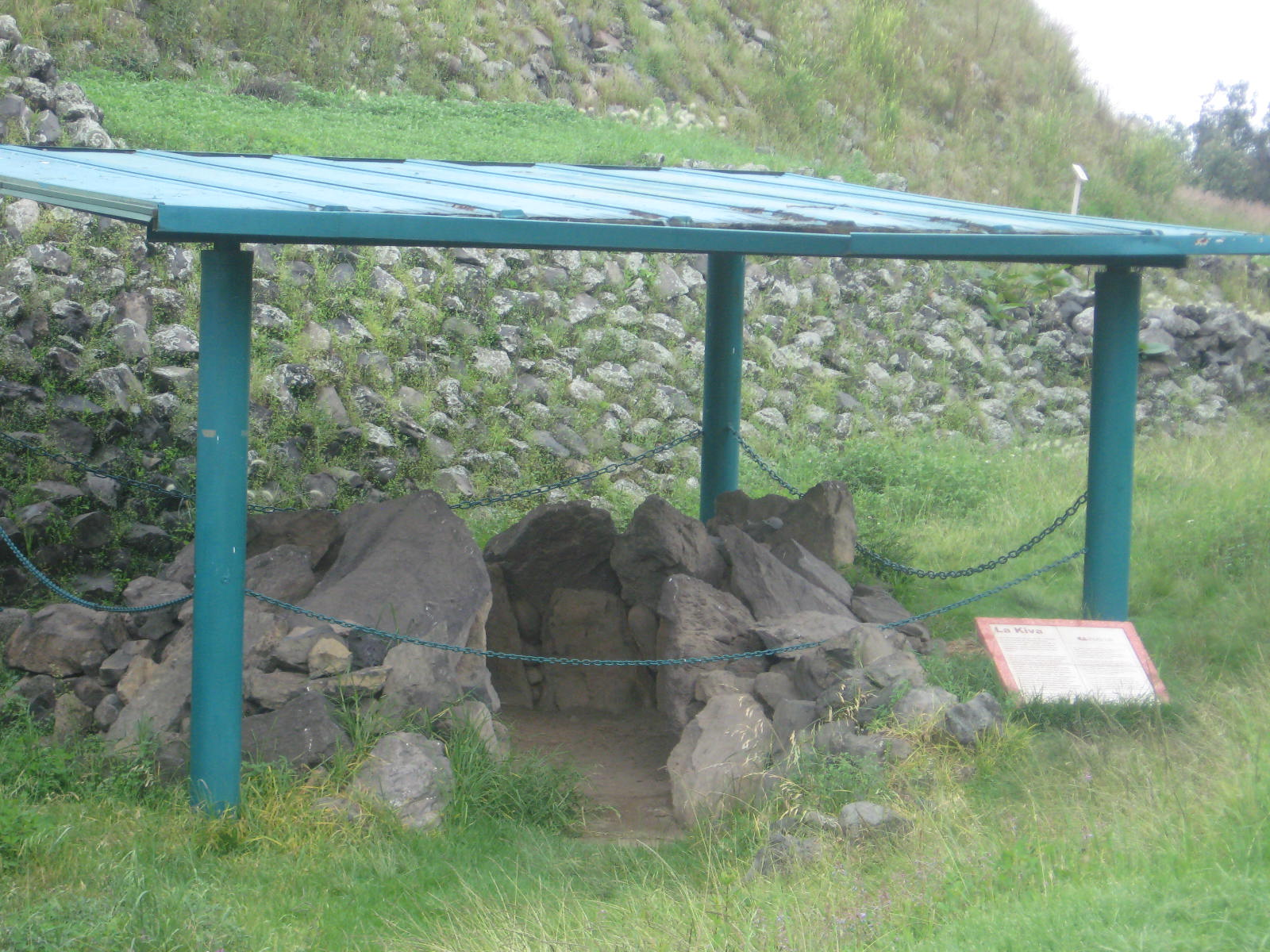
This "kiva" was discovered and named by archeologist Byron Cummings, who likened it to semi-buried round chambers found in the SW U.S. Its ritual purpose is unknown.

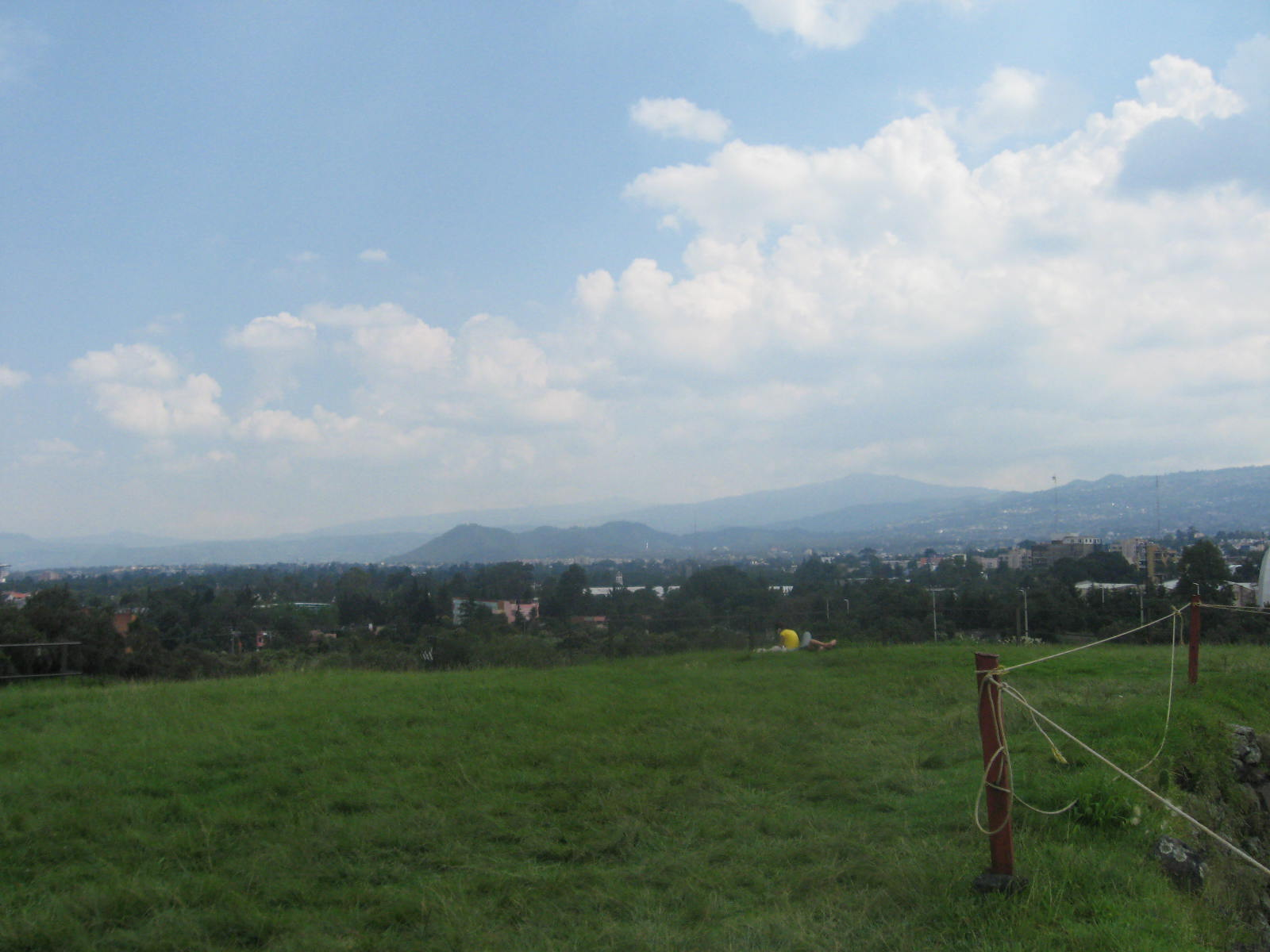
Looking southeast from the top of the main pyramid of Cuicuilco toward the boroughs of Tlalpan and Xochimilco

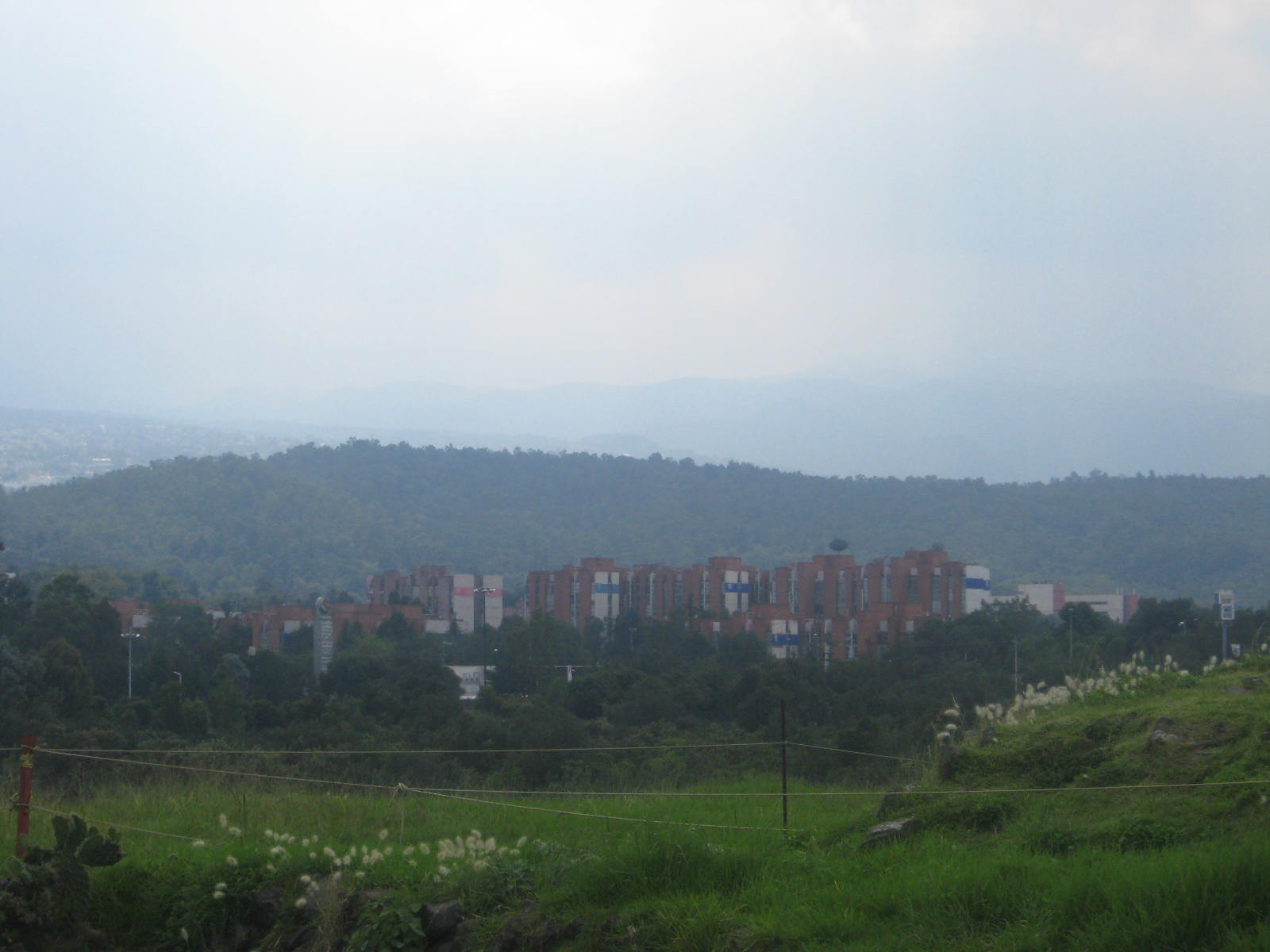
Looking southwest from the top of the pyramid with the Villa Olímpica (now housing) built for the 1968 Summer Olympics

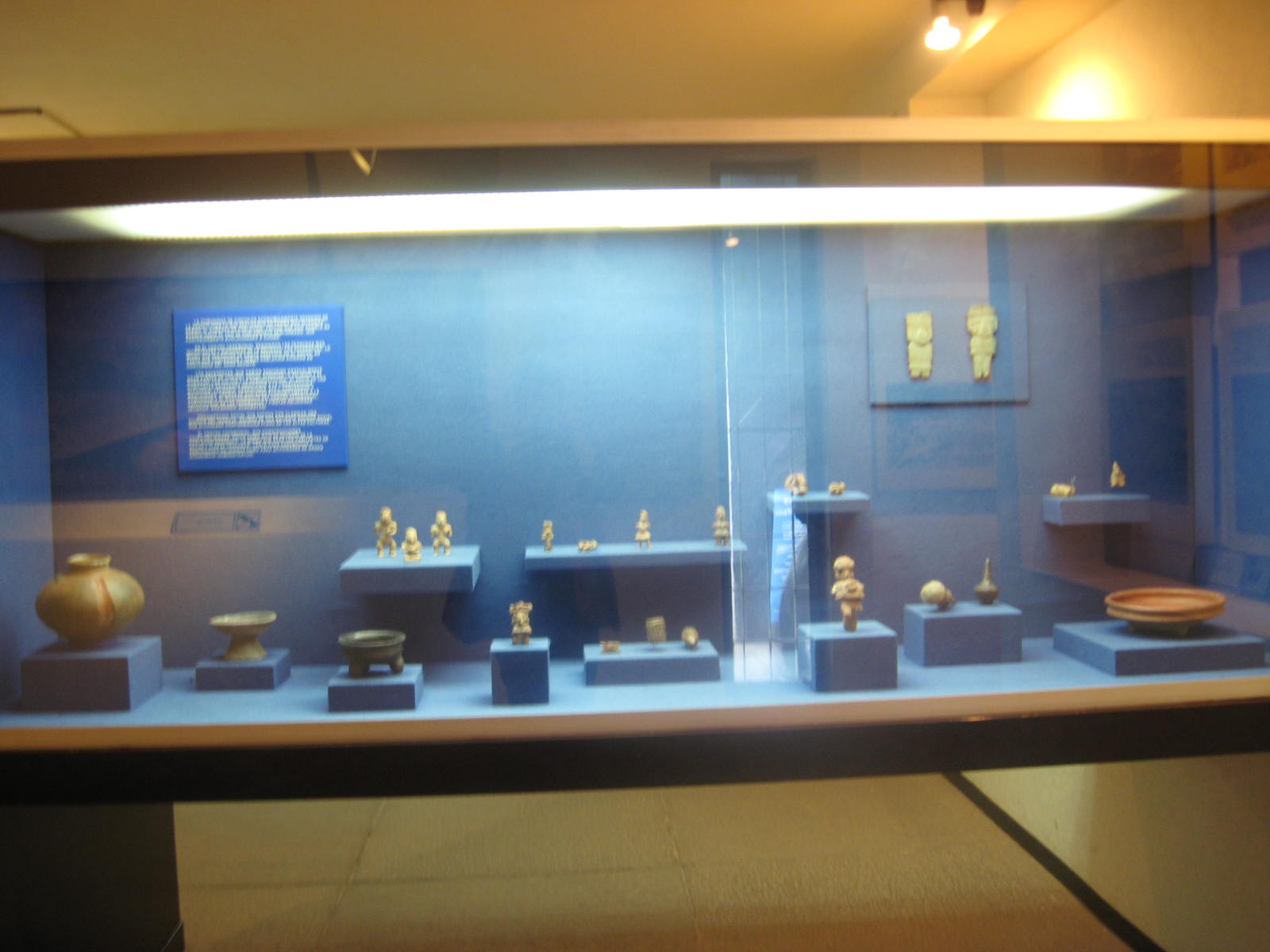
Cuicuilco Museum showcase with clay figurines and pots.

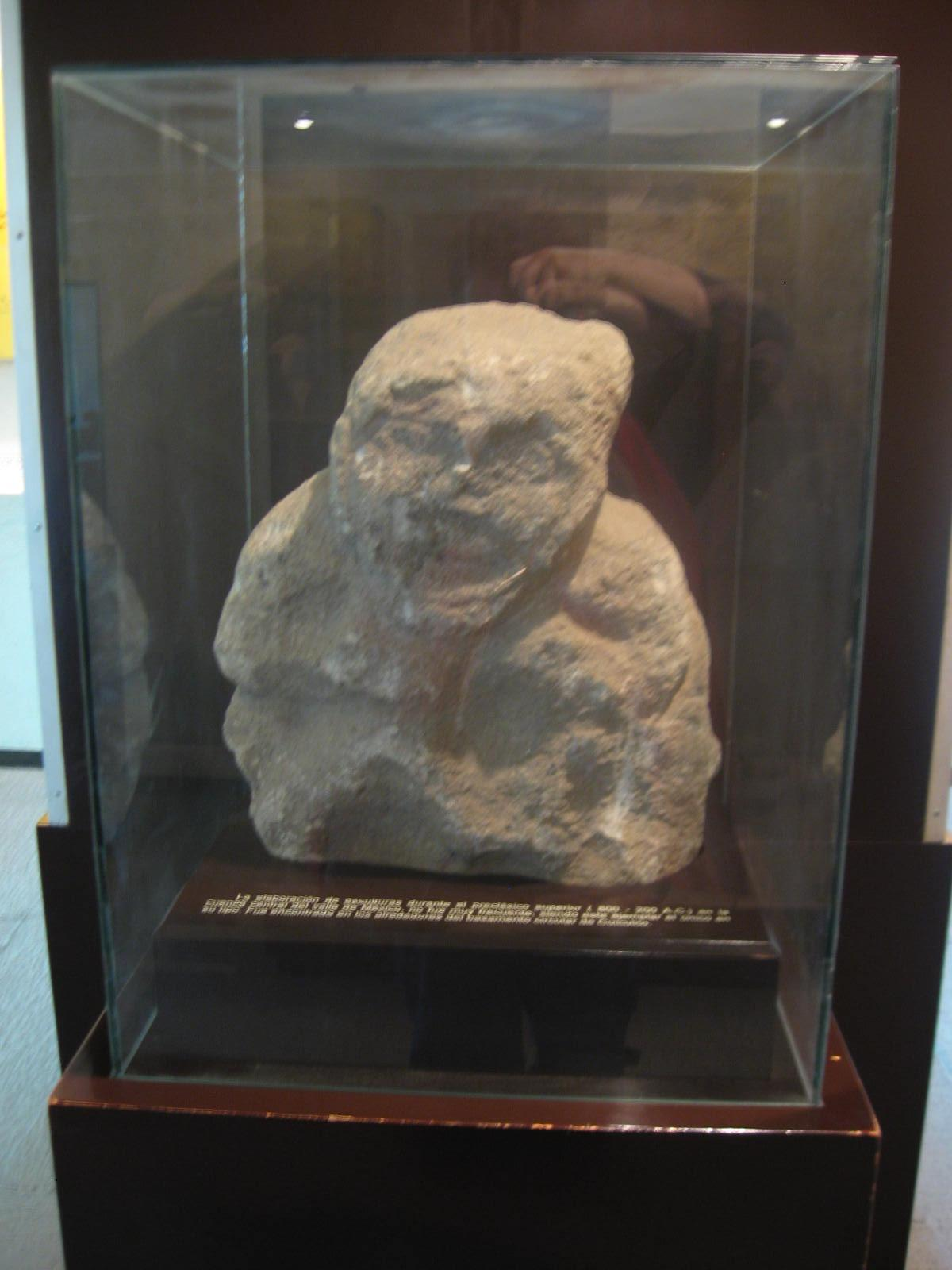
A stone sculpture found at the base of the great pyramid. It is the only one ever found dating to the High Classic Period of Mesoamerica (800 BC – 200 AD)

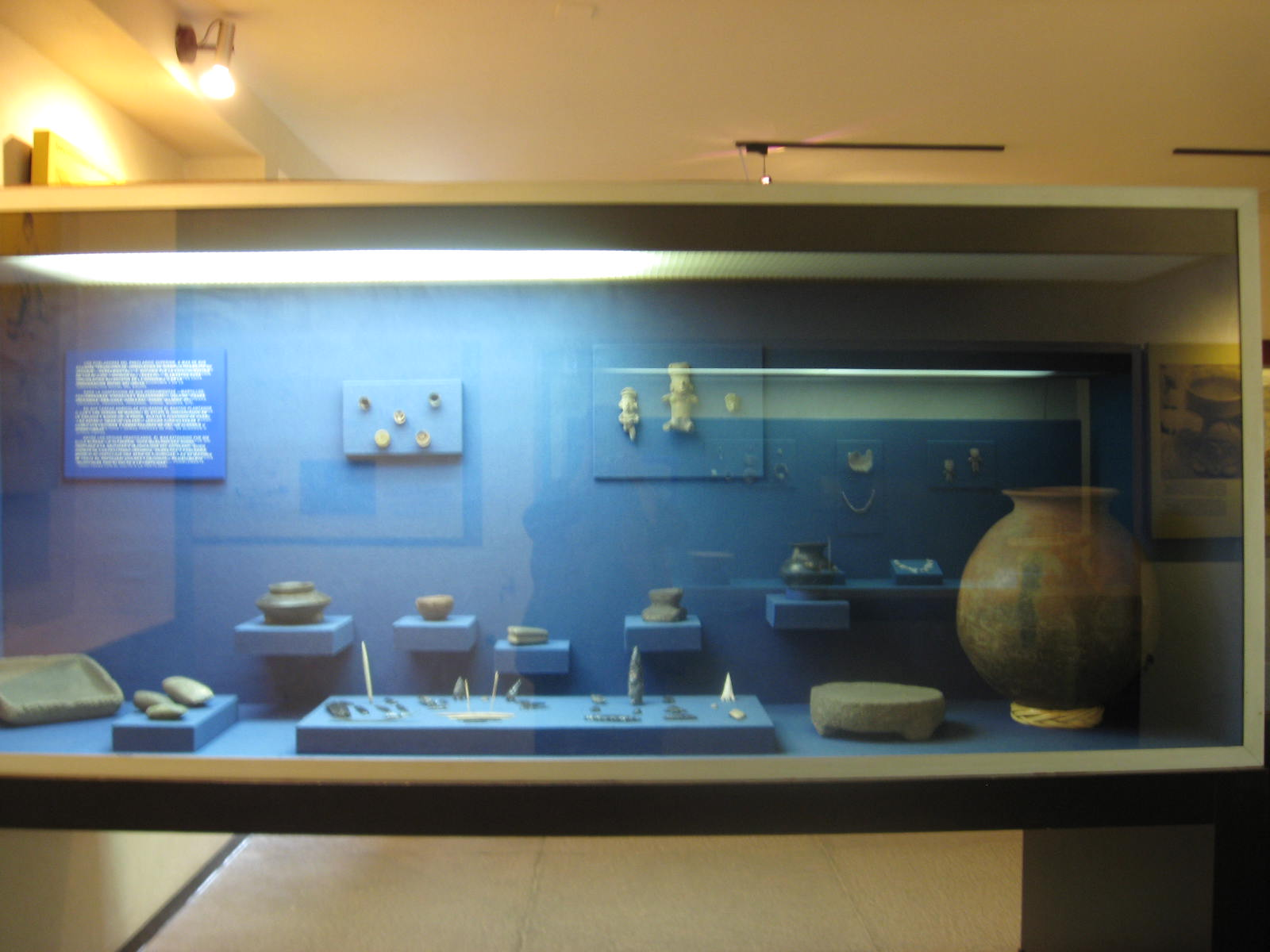
Showcase at the Cuicuilco Museum displaying tools such as mortars, blades and pots

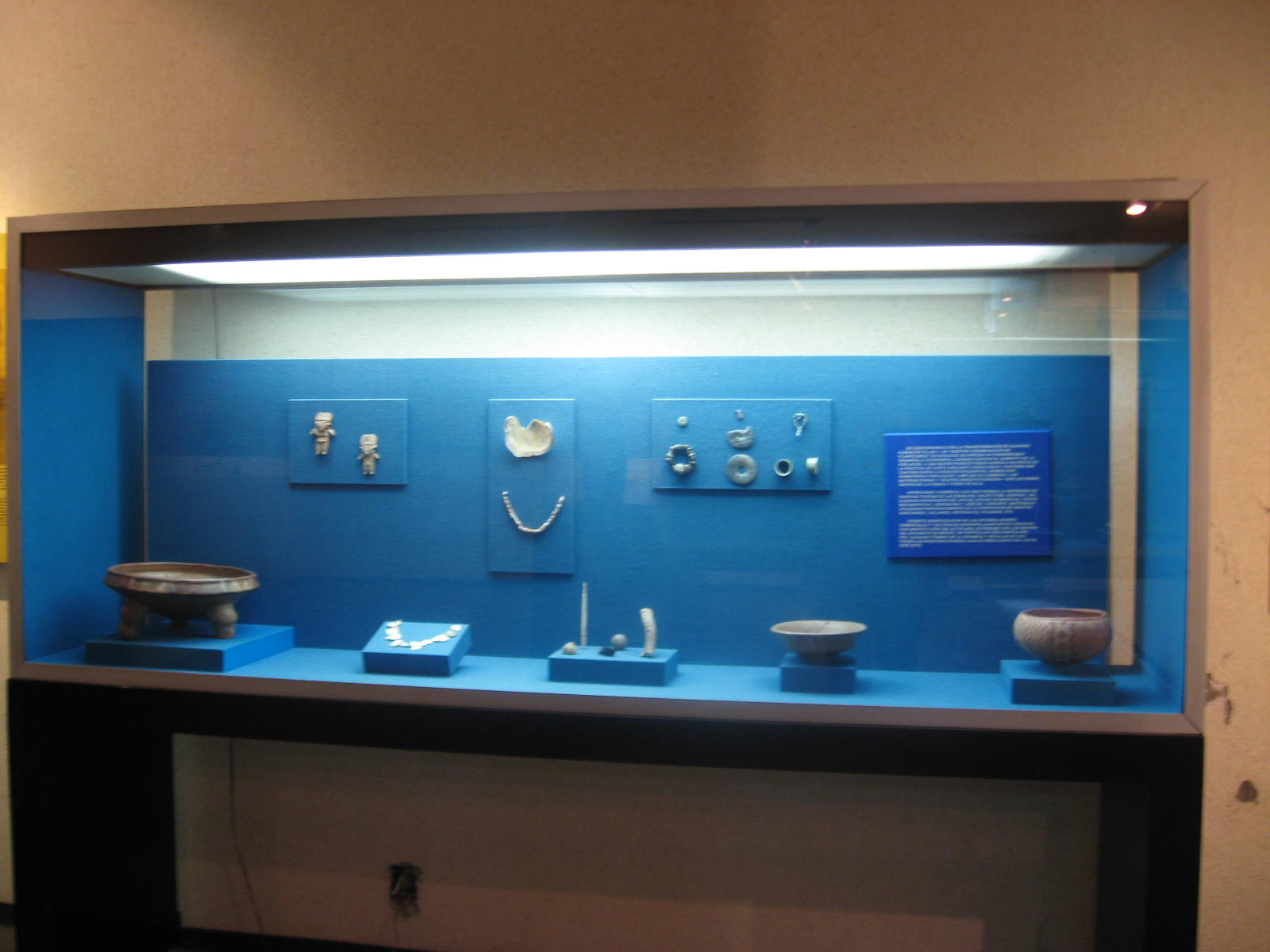
Showcase with jewelry, among other items

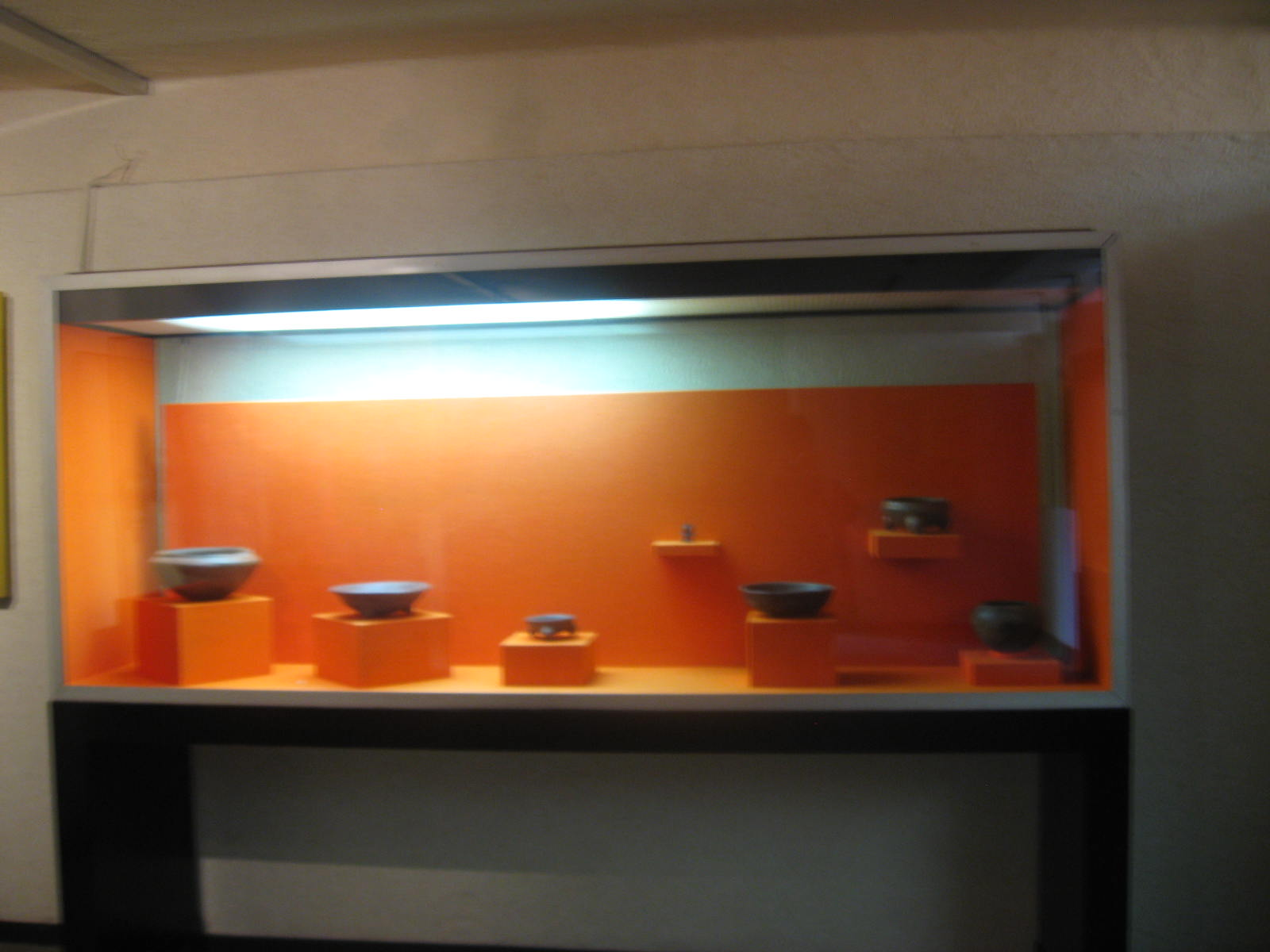
Showcase with bowls

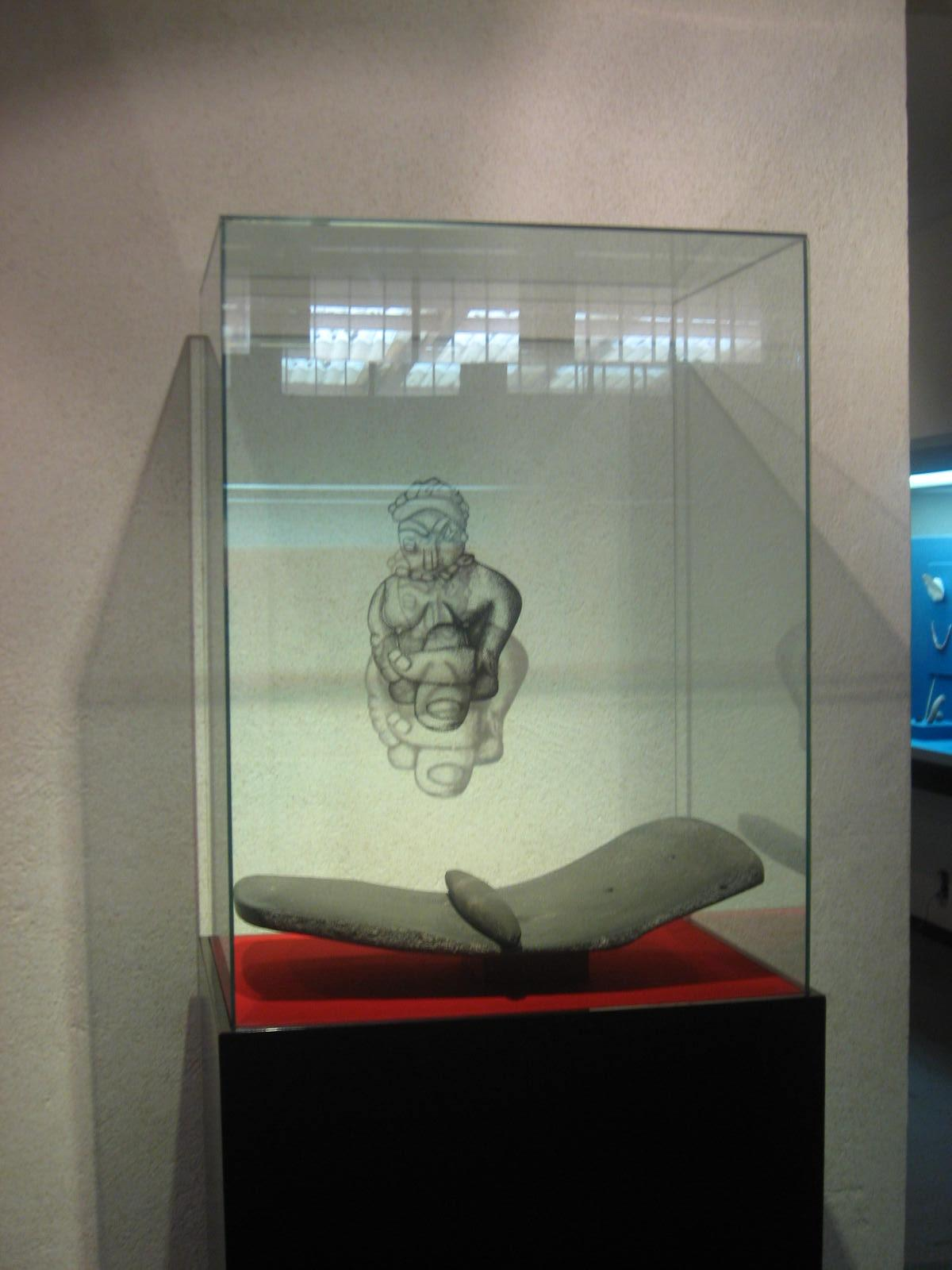
Showcase with a type of "metate" used to grind corn. The drawing above illustrates how this tool was used.

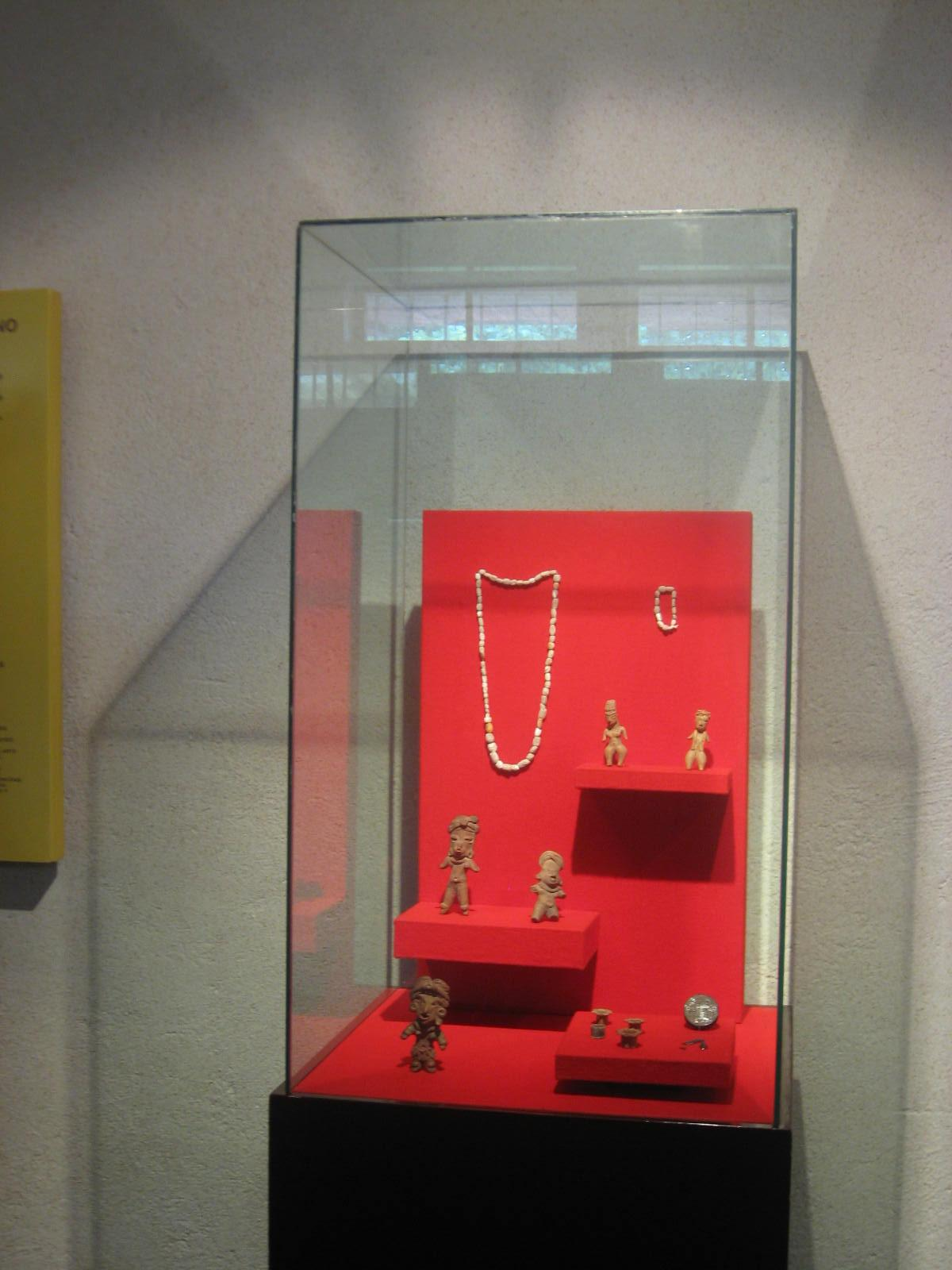
Clay figurines adorned with jewelry like that on display

== Sources ==
- Adams, Richard E. W. "Prehistoric Mesoamerica." University of Oklahoma Press, Norman, Oklahoma, 1991.
- Cobean, Robert H. 1990 La cerámica de Tula, Hidalgo . Instituto Nacional de Antropología e Historia, México. (Spanish)
- Durán, Diego de 1967 Historia de las Indias de Nueva España e islas de la Tierra Firme. 3 vols. Editorial Porrúa, S.A., México. (Spanish)
- Müller, Jacobs Florencia 1990 La cerámica de Cuicuilco B. Un rescate arqueológico. Instituto Nacional de Antropología e Historia, México. (Spanish)
- Lenz, Hanz 1990 Historia del papel en México y cosas relacionadas. 1525-1950 . Miguel Angel Porrúa, México. (Spanish)
- Pastrana, Alejandro, and Patricia Fournier. "Cuicuilco." In The Oxford Encyclopedia of Mesoamerican Cultures. : Oxford University Press, 2001
- Rattray, Evelyn C. 1966 An archaeological and stylistic study of Coyotlatelco pottery. Mesoamerican Notes 7-8:87-193. Universidad de las Américas, Puebla, México.
- 1991 Fechamientos por radiocarbono en Teotihuacan. Arqueología, segunda época 6:3-18. Instituto Nacional de Antropología e Historia, México. (Spanish)
- Rodríguez, Ernesto 1994 Cuicuilco "C". Un rescate arqueológico en el sur de la Ciudad de México. Tesis de Licenciatura en Arqueología, Escuela Nacional de Antropología e Historia, México. (Spanish)
- Sanders, William T. 1981 Ecological adaptations in the Basin of Mexico: 23,000 B.C. to the present. En Supplement to the Handbook of Middle American Indians, vol I, Archaeology, ed. por J.A. Sabloff, pp. 147–197. University of Texas Press, Austin.
- Schávelzon, Daniel 1983 La pirámide de Cuicuilco. Fondo de Cultura Económica, México.
- Sahagún, Bernardino de 1989 Historia general de las cosas de la Nueva España. Consejo Nacional para la Cultura y las Artes, México. (Spanish)
- Wolf, E. and A. Palerm. "Sistema de riego en el Pedregal." In "Agricultura y Civilización en Mesoamerica, Secretaria de Educación Pública", colección SepSetentas, México, 1972.
