= National lottery =

National Lottery may refer to:

- National Lottery (Ireland), the state lottery of Ireland
- National Lottery (United Kingdom), the lottery franchise in the United Kingdom
- South African National Lottery, established in 2000
- A number of countries conduct games designated national lottery (in the singular), or national lotteries (in the plural), see Countries with a national lottery

National lottery may also refer to:

- The National Lottery Awards, Annual awards issued to National Lottery Good Causes projects in the United Kingdom
- The National Lottery Draws, a program shown on BBC One showing the drawing of the United Kingdom's National Lottery.
