= Ramón Torres Martínez =

Mexican architect

Ramón Torres Martínez (November 22, 1924 - September 4, 2008) was a Mexican architect.

His 1950s designs were influenced by the Bauhaus movement. Together with Héctor Velázquez Moreno he founded the architecture bureau Torres y Velázquez Arquitectos y Asociados, and was director of the Faculty of Architecture of the Universidad Nacional Autónoma de México (UNAM). He co-designed Plaza Jacaranda shopping center in Zona Rosa, Mexico City, opened in 1957.

== Awards ==
- 2005 Premio Nacional de Arquitectura
- 2007 "Antonio Attolini Lack" medal
- 2007 Honor award, "Iconos de Diseño", Architectural Digest México
