= Jacques Moeschal (architect) =

Belgian architect and sculptor

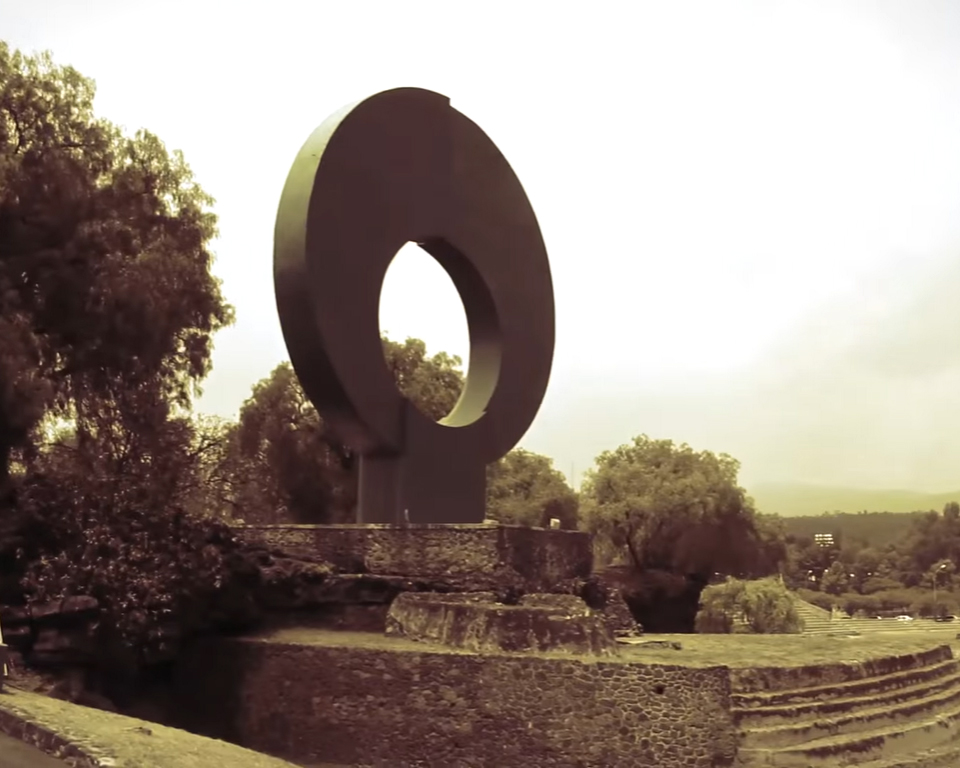
Solar Disk, a sculpture by Jacques Moeschal on Route of Friendship in Mexico City.

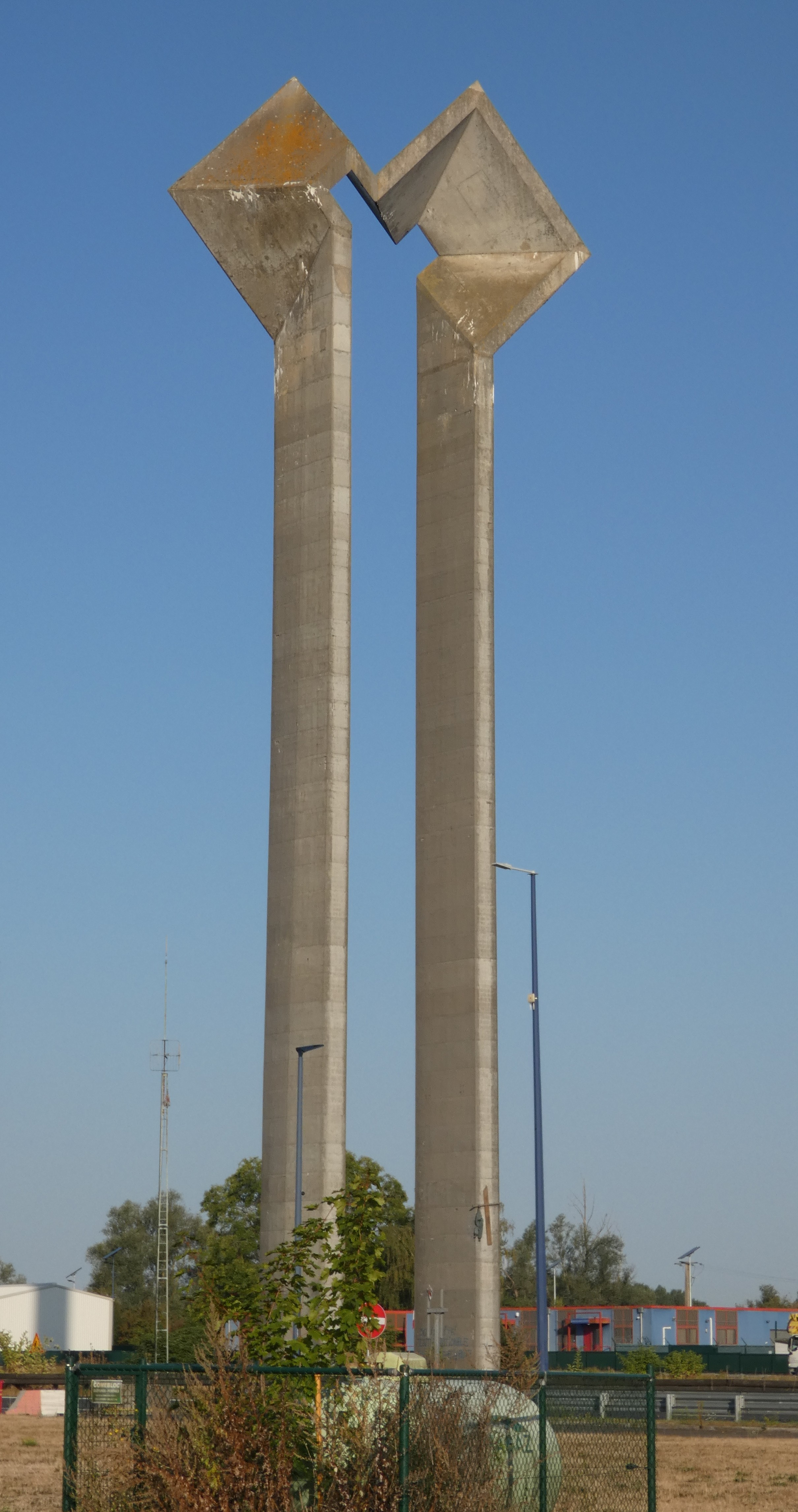
Signal d'Hensies.

Jacques, Knight Moeschal (1913–2004) was a Belgian architect and sculptor.

== Education ==
He studied architecture and later trained as a sculptor at the Royal Academy of Fine Arts in Brussels.

== Work ==
Moeschal's signature works often featured large-scale concrete sculptures that were both abstract and geometric, reflecting his architectural background. His work is a part of the University Library in Leuven, Belgium. The library has a sculpture of an eagle catching a fish sculpted by him.

Moeschal's international recognition began with his design of the Arrow of Civil Engineering for Expo 58 in Brussels, a monumental structure symbolizing modern engineering. Following this success, he created numerous iconic sculptures displayed along highways in Belgium, such as the Signal of Zellik.
