= South Korea–United States relations =

- South Korea: United States

Diplomatic mission
- South Korean Embassy, Washington D.C.: United States Embassy, Seoul

Envoy
- Ambassador Kang Kyung-hwa: Ambassador Michelle Steel

Diplomatic relations between South Korea and the United States commenced in 1949. The United States helped establish the modern state of South Korea, officially the Republic of Korea, and fought on its UN-sponsored side in the Korean War (1950–1953). During the subsequent decades, South Korea experienced tremendous economic, political and military growth. To date, the United States recognizes the ROK as the sole legitimate government of Korea.

South Korea has a long military alliance with the United States, aiding the U.S. in every war since the Vietnam War, including the Iraq War. At the 2009 G20 London summit, then-U.S. president Barack Obama called South Korea "one of America's closest allies and greatest friends". In 1987, South Korea was among the first batch of countries to be designated as a major non-NATO ally. In June 2023, South Korean president Yoon Suk Yeol said that he had upgraded the country's alliance with the United States to one that is "nuclear-based" in the face of North Korea's growing military threat.

According to a 2026 Pew Research poll, 45% of South Koreans had a favorable view of the United States, while 55% had a negative view. According to a 2018 Gallup poll, 77% of Americans had a favorable view of South Koreans, while 22% had a negative view.

== Country comparison ==
Leaders of South Korea and the United States from 1950

== History ==
=== Background ===
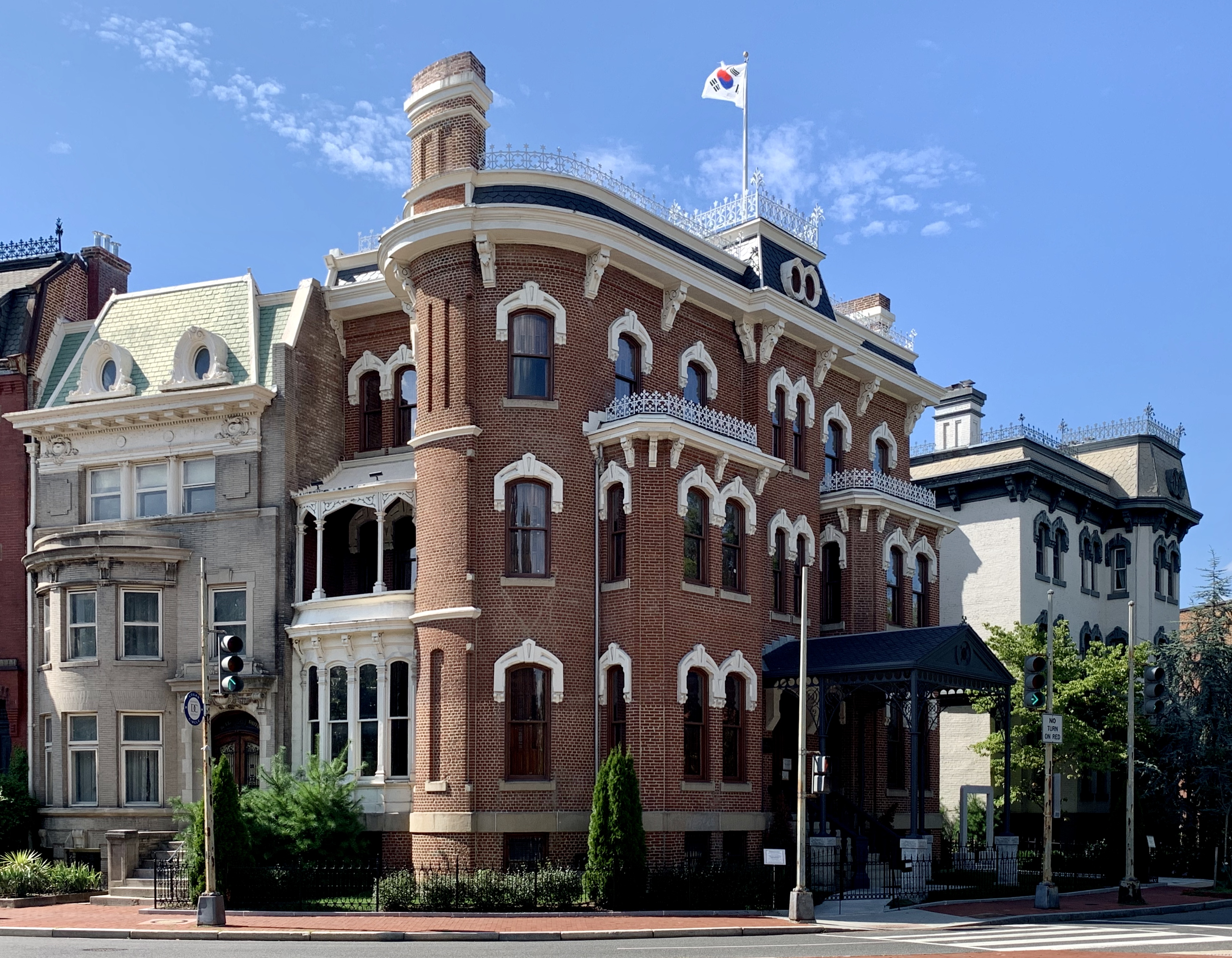
The Old Korean Legation Museum in Washington, D.C. is where the Korean legation was housed from 1889 to 1905.

Following the United States expedition to Korea in 1871, the United States and Joseon established diplomatic relations under the 1882 Treaty of Peace, Amity, Commerce, and Navigation. In 1883, Joseon sent the first ever Korean special mission to the United States, also known in Korean as Bobingsa (보빙사; 報聘使). However, Japan assumed direction over Korean foreign affairs in 1905 and in 1910 began a 35-year period of colonial rule over Korea.

In 1945, Japan surrendered to the Allies at the end of World War II. The United States proposed to the USSR that they could share responsibility of the Korean peninsula, dividing the Korean peninsula at the 38th parallel into two occupation zones, with the United States in the South and the Soviet Union in the North. This was intended to be a temporary measure.

Each half was polarized politically: the USSR-backed North was led by the Communist Party, while U.S. General John Hodge handpicked far-right Syngman Rhee to lead the South. Initial talks in 1945–6 to achieve a unified, independent Korea were not successful. The U.S. petitioned the United Nations to find a resolution, and the UN concluded that elections should be held. In reality, only the South held an election, as the North refused to allow UN officials entry to supervise the election. Syngman Rhee was officially elected after ruling the South for several years already, and in turn Stalin's regime appointed Communist Kim Il-Sung without an election.

In 1948, two separate nations were established: the Republic of Korea (ROK) in the South, and the Democratic People's Republic of Korea (DPRK) in the North. On January 1, 1949, the United States officially recognized the Republic of Korea as the sole legitimate government of Korea and established diplomatic relations on March 25 of that year.

=== Korean War 1950-1953 ===
Cross-border skirmishes and raids at the 38th Parallel escalated into open warfare when the North Korean forces started to invade South Korea on June 25, 1950. In response, 16 member countries of the United Nations, led by the United States, came to the defense of South Korea. It was the first significant armed conflict of the Cold War with extensive deployment of U.S. and other troops. The Korean War was a major Cold War military clash fought up and down the peninsula of Korea, finally leading to a stalemate in 1953 that restored the boundaries to nearly what they were at the start, along the 38th parallel. The war was initiated by Kim Il-sung of the Democratic People's Republic of Korea (North Korea), with assistance from China and the Soviet Union[1] were arrayed against the Republic of Korea (South Korea), supported by the United States of America and a multinational United Nations force.

The war began with an invasion by North Korea in June 1950, followed by an unexpected American entry. North Korean forces had pushed the South Koreans and Americans back into a small perimeter around the port of Pusan. In September 1950, an amphibious landing at Inchon, followed by a breakout from the Pusan Perimeter, turned the tide. The North Korean People's Army (NKPA) disintegrated as the allies moved north, with UN approval, to unify the country. Unexpectedly the Chinese then sent in large numbers of infantry, and in the bitter cold of November-January 1950-51 pushed the UN forces out of the north. Communist supply lines were fragile, especially in the face of heavy American bombing, so the lines stabilized close to the 38th parallel in 1951. Two more years of static warfare followed, with the issue of returning reluctant Communist prisoners of war held by the UN the major sticking point. Finally an armistice was reached in summer 1953; the prisoners were exchanged and fighting ended in an uneasy truce that continues into the 21st century.

The war was limited in size and scope, but casualties were heavy on both sides. In the U.S., the political consequences of the war contributed to the defeat of the Truman administration and his Democratic party in the 1952 election of General Dwight D. Eisenhower, the Republican candidate who promised to end the war. For Americans and Chinese it is a "forgotten war", neglected on the timeline between the twin cataclysms of World War II and Vietnam. For the Koreans it is the central event of their modern history, and efforts to reunify the land continue.

=== Origins of the South Korea–United States alliance ===
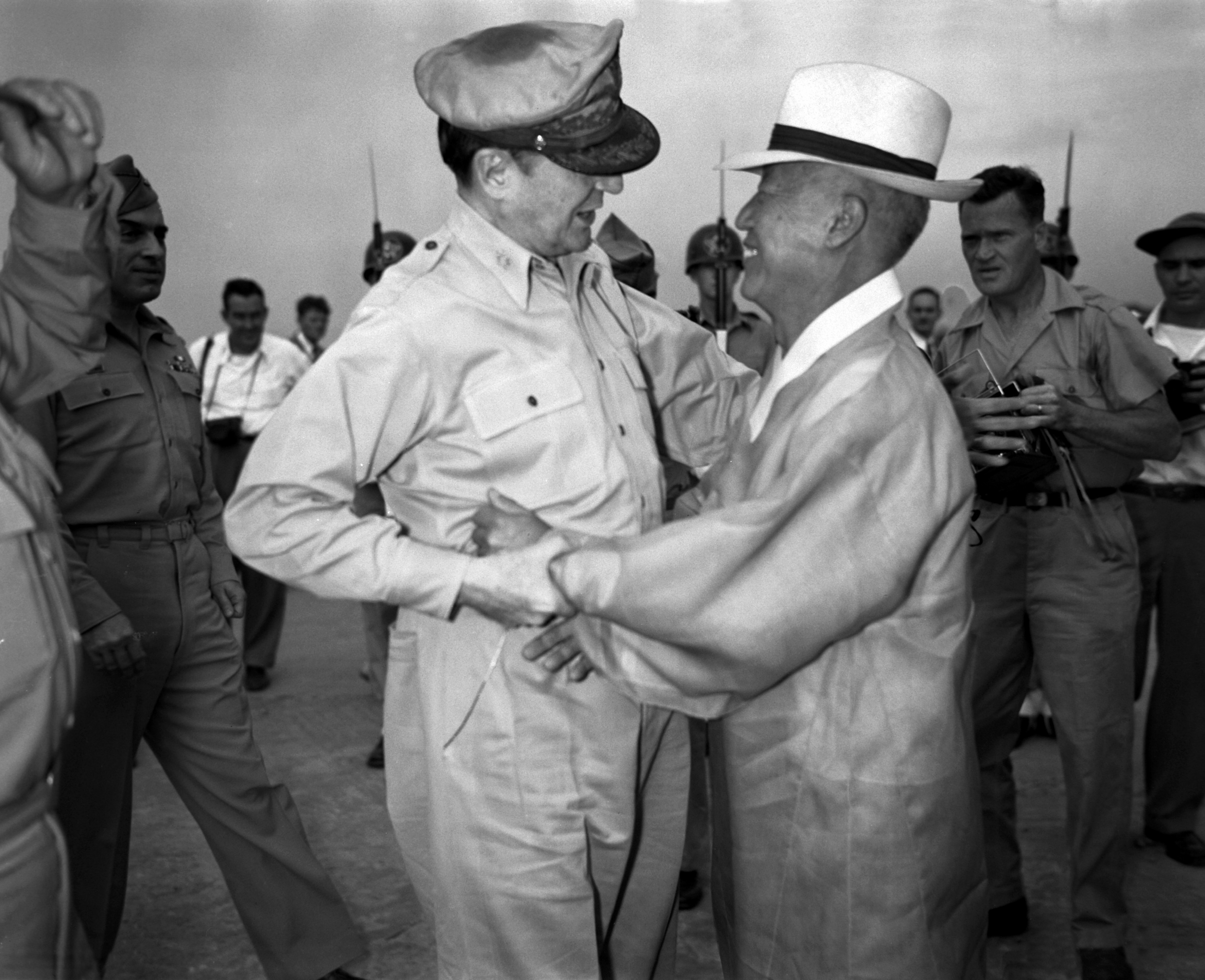
General Douglas MacArthur and Syngman Rhee, Korea's first President

In 1953, following the end of the Korean War, the United States established a bilaterial alliance pact with South Korea.

Moreover, the "U.S. alliance with South Korea would consequently have three functions. First, it would serve as part of a network of alliances and military installations designed to ring the Soviet threat in the Pacific. Second, it would deter a second North Korean attack, with U.S. ground troops serving as the 'tripwire' guaranteeing U.S. involvement. Third, it would restrain the South from engaging in adventurism".

The United States and South Korea are allies under the 1953 Mutual Defense Treaty. Under the agreement, U.S. military personnel have maintained a continuous presence on the Korean peninsula.

=== Issues and recent history ===
==== U.S. military and the sex trade ====
In 1953, at the end of the Korean War, the number of prostitutes in South Korea was estimated as about 350,000, with about 60 percent working near U.S. military camps. In the post-Korean War period, the U.S. military continued to contribute significantly to the South Korean economy, providing an estimated 1 percent of the South Korean GNP in 1991, including the sex industry. Despite the world-wide growth of women's human rights advocacy since the 1990s, and the shift towards foreign workers providing sex services for U.S. troops, (particularly women trafficked from the Philippines and the former Soviet Union), prostitution via "juicy bars" remains an issue near U.S. bases in South Korea.

==== 1992 Yun Geum-i murder ====
In 1992, Yun Geum-i, a 26-year-old woman, was brutally killed by a U.S. serviceman, Private Kenneth L. Markle, in Dongducheon. In August 1993, the U.S. government compensated the victim's family with a payment of about US$72,000. Markle was sentenced by a South Korean court to life imprisonment, later reduced to 15 years. Professor Katharine Moon notes that the murder was not unique, and did not spark a national debate about the presence of U.S. forces. However, it did become a "call to action" for some Koreans, and led to the establishment of the "National Campaign for the Eradication of Crimes by U.S. troops."

==== Environmental degradation ====
In July 2000, the Eighth U.S. Army apologized for an incident where formaldehyde, a toxic fluid, was released into the Han River in February of that year. In a report released in 2017 detailing spill incidents from 1995 to 2015 at the US garrison in Yongsan, South Korean environmentalist groups expressed concern about the lack of transparency and the possibility of continued water contamination, as well as who would take responsibility for cleanup of the site.

==== Yangju highway incident ====
On 13 June 2002, two 14-year-old South Korean schoolgirls were crushed to death by a 50-ton United States Army vehicle in Yangju. Anti-Americanism was pervasive after the driver and the navigator of the vehicle were both acquitted in U.S. courts-martial on charges of negligent homicide. There was resentment from protesters towards the U.S.–South Korea Status of Forces Agreement, which restricted South Korea from having jurisdiction over alleged crimes that occurred when American soldiers were on official duty. South Korean presidential candidate Lee Hoi-chang called on United States President George W. Bush to "apologize to soothe the pain of the Korean people and to prevent any escalation in anti-American sentiment". American ambassador to South Korea Thomas C. Hubbard apologized on behalf of Bush.

==== 2008 beef protests in South Korea ====
The Government of South Korea banned imports of U.S. beef in 2003 in response to a case of mad cow disease in Washington state. In 2008, protests were held against U.S. beef that were reminiscent of the student "pro-democracy" movements of the 1980s. Nevertheless, by 2010, South Korea had become the world's third largest U.S. beef importer. With its strong import growth, South Korea surpassed Japan for the first time to become the largest market for U.S. beef in Asia; in 2016, U.S. beef imports in Korea reached a value of $1 billion.

==== 2015 attack on the United States Ambassador ====
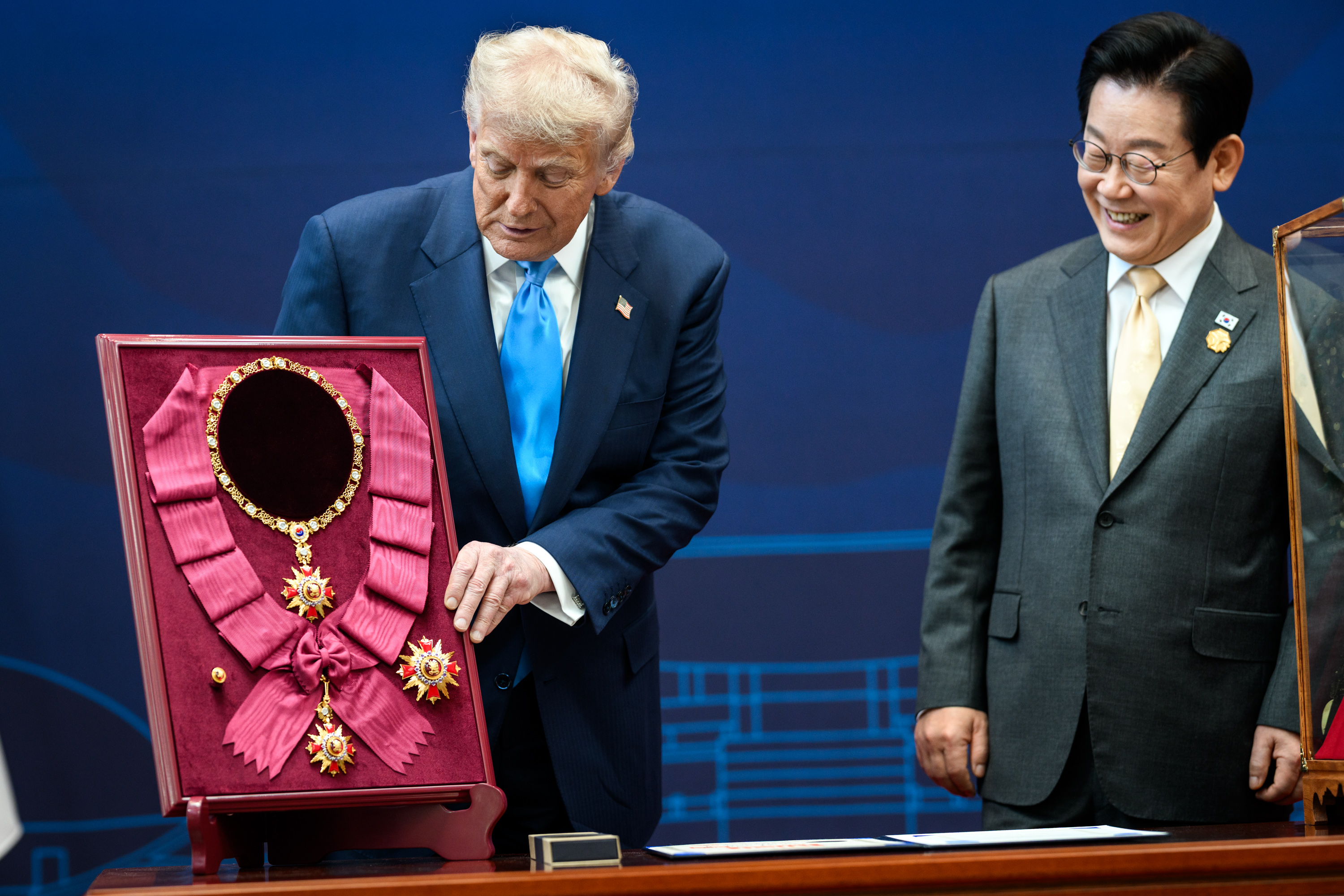
President Donald Trump is awarded the Grand Order of Mugunghwa in October 2025, the first U.S. President to ever receive this award.

At around 7:40 a.m. on March 5, 2015, United States Ambassador to South Korea Mark Lippert was attacked by a knife-wielding man at a restaurant attached to Sejong Center in downtown Seoul, where he was scheduled to give a speech at a meeting of the Korean Council for Reconciliation and Cooperation. The assailant, Kim Ki-jong, is a member of Uri Madang, a progressive cultural organization opposed to the Korean War. He inflicted wounds on Lippert's left arm as well as a four-inch cut on the right side of the ambassador's face, requiring 80 stitches. Lippert underwent surgery at Yonsei University's Severance Hospital in Seoul. While his injuries were not life-threatening, doctors stated that it would take several months for Lippert to regain use of his fingers. A police official said that the knife used in the attack was 10 inches (25 cm) long and Lippert later reported that the blade penetrated to within 2 cm of his carotid artery. ABC News summarized the immediate aftermath of the attack as follows: "Ambassador Lippert, an Iraq war veteran, defended himself from the attack. Lippert was rushed to a hospital where he was treated for deep cuts to his face, his arm, and his hand. ... [He] kept his cool throughout the incident."

During the attack and while being subdued by security, Kim screamed that the rival Koreas should be unified and told reporters that he had attacked Lippert to protest the annual United States–South Korean joint military exercises. Kim has a record of militant Korean nationalist activism; he attacked the Japanese ambassador to South Korea in 2010 and was sentenced to a three-year suspended prison term. On September 11, 2015, Kim was sentenced to twelve years in prison for the attack.

==== Opposition to THAAD ====
The rollout of the Terminal High Altitude Area Defense (THAAD) has been met with domestic opposition in South Korea. The opposition has been on the grounds that the North Korean threat has gone, and on environmental grounds. THAAD was deployed under the administration of ROK President Park Geun-hye. Her opponents accused her of "bow[ing] too readily to America's requests." According to South China Morning Post, when Prime Minister Hwang Kyo-ahn visited Seongju to appease the local backlash against THAAD, demonstrators blocked Hwang's buses and pelted him with eggs and water bottles. The progressive People's Party also opposes the deployment.

==== 2025 Trade Agreement ====
As part of President Donald Trump's Liberation Day tariffs in April 2025, the United States announced a trade deal with South Korea that called for tariffs of up to 25% on their goods. Rather than retaliating with tariffs of their own, South Korea pursued a proactive negotiation strategy, sending officials frequently to Washington to create a framework for a deal that would reduce the US tariff rate. As a result, the US lowered their tariffs on South Korea to 15%, while South Korea pledged a $350bn investment fund for US-owned companies within their country.

Following the September 2025 Georgia Hyundai plant immigration raid where 300 Korean workers were detained, President Lee Jae Myung warned that concerns over the treatment of Korean technicians in the United States were making businesses hesitant to invest directly, further complicating the trade negotiations. “We will not make a decision that goes against our national interests,” he said, adding, “We will not engage in negotiations that are not rational or just.”

==== Reduction of yearly joint military exercises ====
In August 2026, US President Donald Trump ordered the Pentagon to reduce yearly Ulchi-Freedom Guardian joint exercises with South Korea, saying that the ally's refused to help with the 2026 Iran war and citing his good relationship with North Korean leader Kim Jong Un and the high cost of the exercises. On 26 August, the U.S. Pacific Command announced that the United States will conduct trilateral military exercises with South Korea's armed forces and Japan's self-defense forces despite U.S. president Trump scaling back on the recent Ulchi-Freedom Guardian exercises.

== The United States military in Korea ==
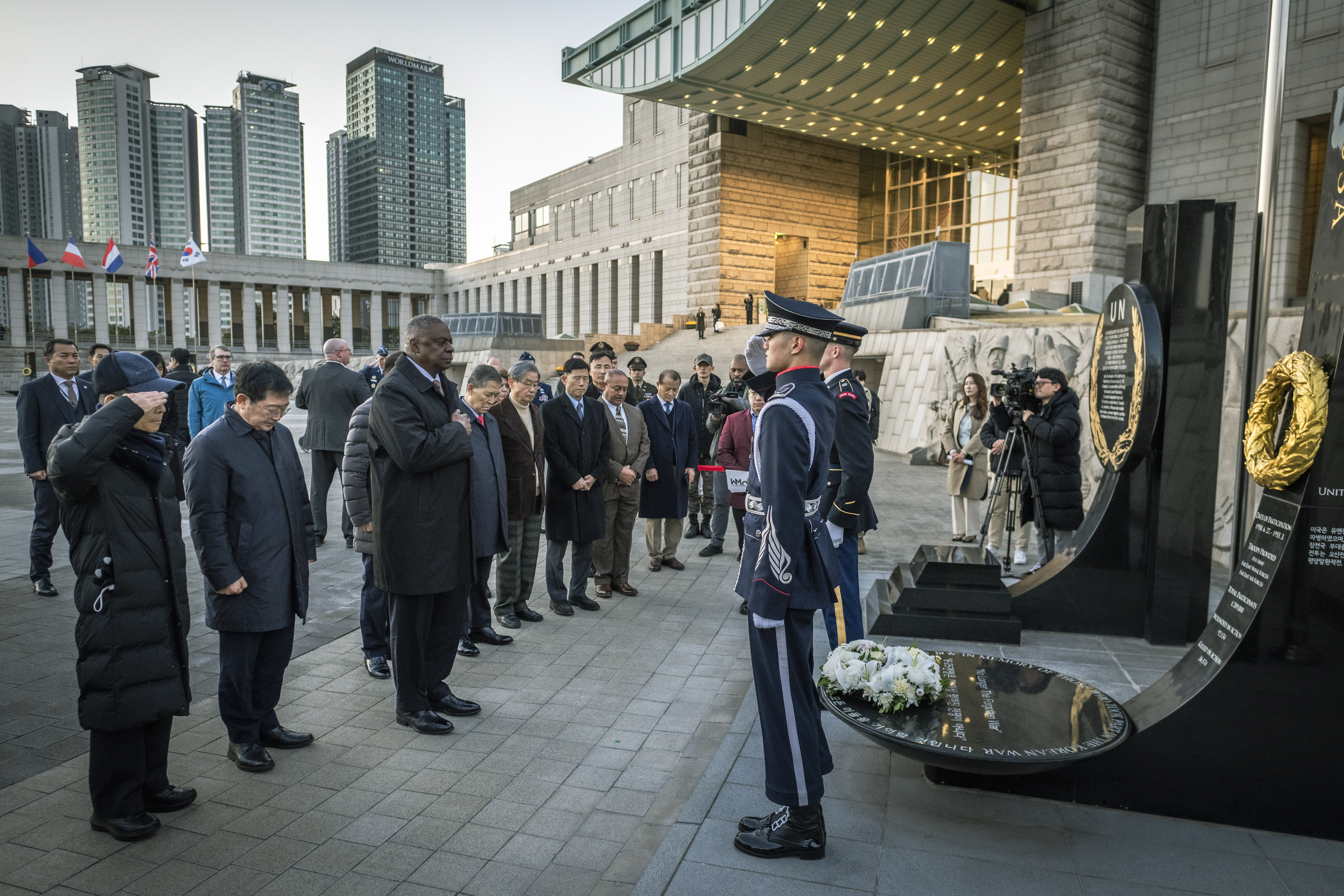
US Secretary of Defense Lloyd Austin lays a wreath at the War Memorial of Korea

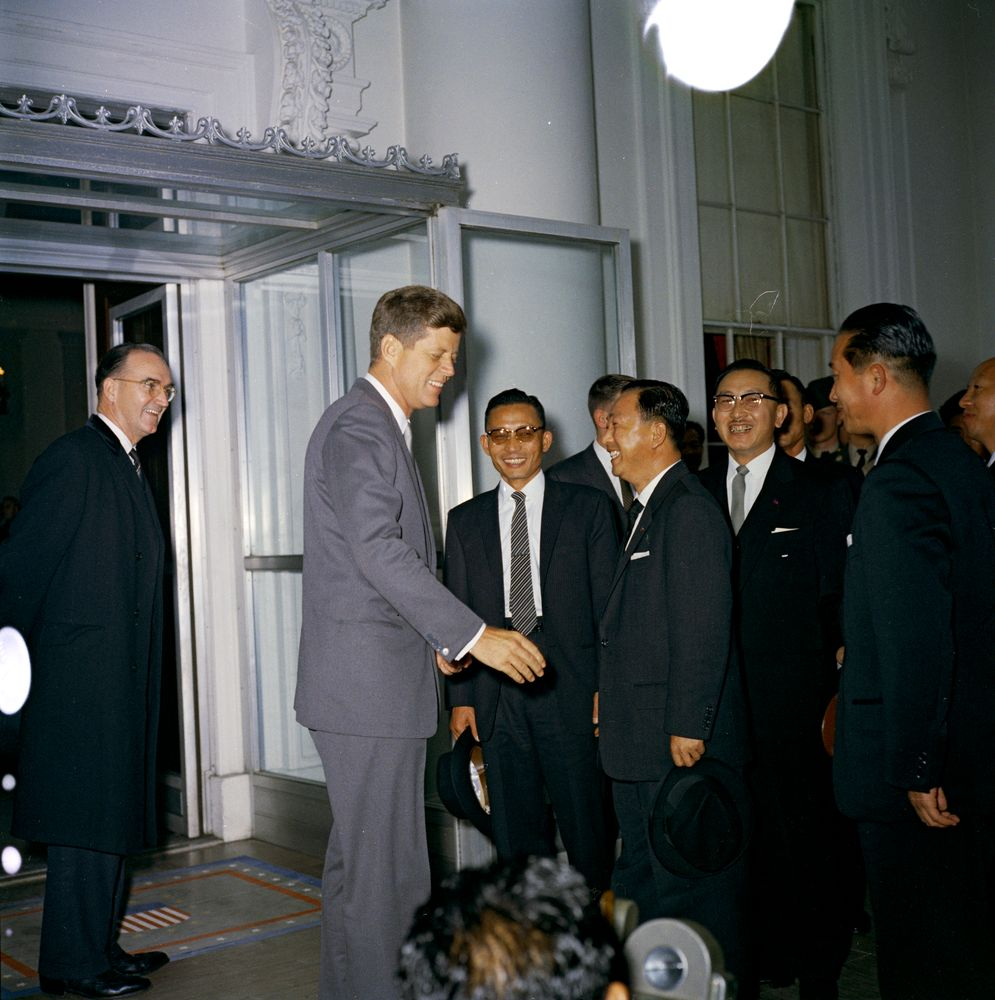
President John F. Kennedy greets General Park Chung Hee, November 1961

South Korea and the United States agreed to a military alliance in 1953. They called it "the relationship forged in blood". In addition, roughly 29,000 United States Forces Korea troops are stationed in South Korea. In 2009, South Korea and the United States pledged to develop the alliance's vision for future defense cooperation. Currently, South Korean forces would fall under United States control should the war resume. As of September 2023, the transfer of this war time control to South Korea is on an indefinite “conditions-based” timeline. Proposals to modernize the alliance include increasing South Korea’s defense budget to 3.5–3.8% of GDP, enhancing cost-sharing for U.S. Forces Korea, and maintaining a clear transfer plan for wartime operational control while ensuring continued U.S. military presence and extended nuclear deterrence.

At the request of the United States, President Park Chung Hee sent troops to Vietnam to assist American troops during the Vietnam War, maintaining the second largest contingent of foreign troops after the United States. In exchange, the United States increased military and economic assistance to South Korea. In 2004, President Roh Moo-hyun authorized dispatching a small contingent of troops to Iraq at the request of U.S. President George W. Bush.

Since 2009, air forces of South Korea and the U.S.A. have conducted annual joint exercises under the name "Max Thunder". In 2018, the drills began on May 11 and continued until May 17.

At a Cabinet meeting in Seoul on 10 July 2018, the government decided not to hold that year's Ulchi drill, scheduled for June 2018. The Government said the decision was made in line with recent political and security improvements on the peninsula and the suspension of South Korea-U.S. joint military exercises.

Former South Korean President Moon Jae-in, elected in May 2017, has said he supports the continuation of sanctions against North Korea if it is aimed at bringing North Korea out of its state of isolation and to the negotiating table. He also argued, at the same time, that he was against a "sanctions-only" approach toward North Korea. His approach to North Korea is similar to Kim Dae-jung's Sunshine Policy, which only continued up to the Roh Mu-hyun's administration.

In 2018, there were several rounds of talks regarding sharing the cost of U.S. forces in South Korea. These reflect Washington's desire for South Korea to share a "greater burden" of the costs of the military deployment.

On 12 June 2018, during the 2018 Trump–Kim summit, U.S. president Donald Trump and Kim Jong Un signed a Joint Statement which reaffirmed the Panmunjom Declaration.

The U.S. Ambassador to South Korea, Harry B. Harris Jr., arrived in Seoul on July 7, 2018. The post had been vacant since President Donald Trump took office in January 2017. Harris, a former head of the U.S. military's Pacific Command, has expressed his resolve to work as an ambassador to strengthen the alliance between the United States and South Korea.

On February 10, 2019, South Korea and the United States confirmed that a year long deal for keeping American troops, numbering 28,500, in South Korea had been made. This was in exchange for South Korea paying 925 million dollars to the United States.

In terms of American leadership, Bill Clinton and George W. Bush both emphasized the Middle East over North Korea. Clinton had deep emotional ties with Israel but neglected North Korea issues and never built strong personal relations with South Korean leaders. Bush, whose religious fundamentalism led him to divide the world into good and evil, had a personalized hatred for North Korean leader Kim Jong Il, but he also had frosty relations with South Korean leaders.

In his 2021 New Year's press conference on January 18, President Moon Jae-in stated that the two Koreas might be able to discuss the U.S.-South Korea military drills through a joint inter-Korean military committee. However, U.S. officials expressed that it is not a topic to be decided by Pyongyang, and that scaling down the exercises was not desirable.

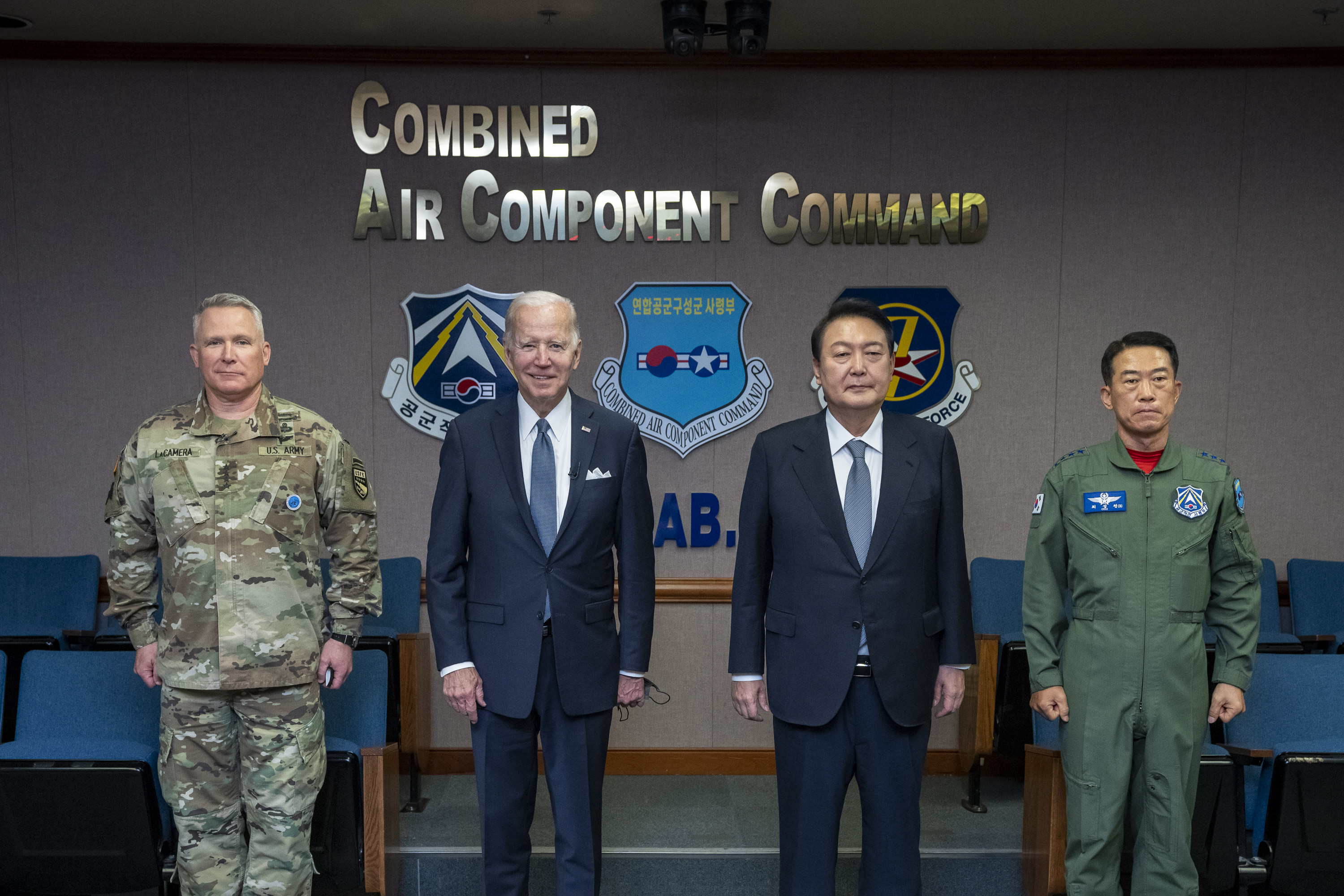
President Joe Biden greets President Yoon Suk Yeol, U.S. Army Commander Gen. Paul LaCamera and Lieutenant General Sung Chun Choi at the Air Operations Center of Osan Air Base in Seoul, South Korea on 22 May 2022

In May 2022, President Joe Biden and President Yoon Suk Yeol agreed in talks to begin discussions on restarting and potentially expanding joint military training on and around the Korean Peninsula. The move was a signal that Biden was changing course from former President Donald Trump's positions in Asia.

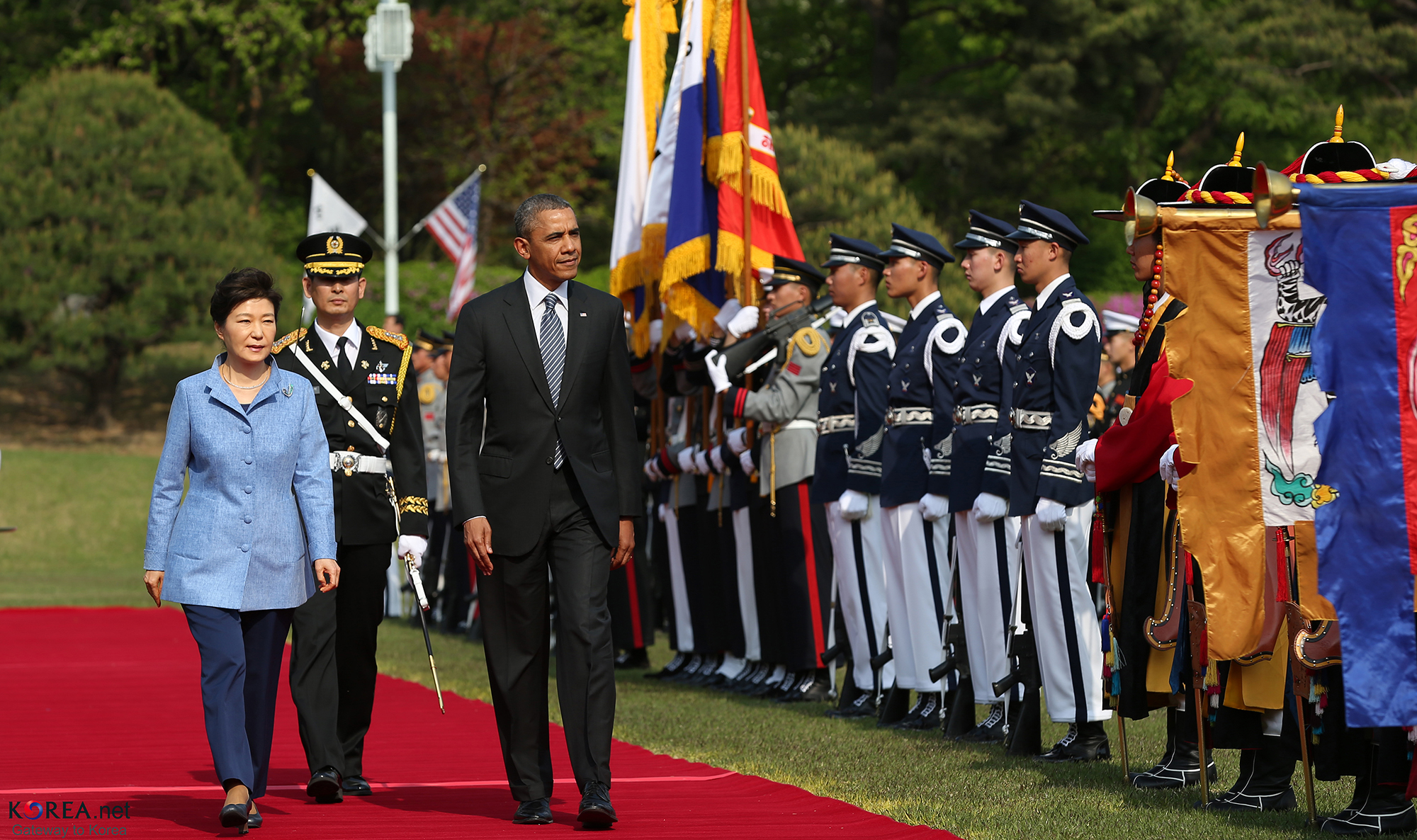
State visit by US President Barack Obama at the Blue House

In April 2023 a visit by Yoon to Washington produced a nuclear deterrence plan aimed at North Korea. Joe Biden said the deal allowed nuclear submarines to dock in South Korea. This capability had not been seen since 1991. Biden said: "A nuclear attack by North Korea against the United States or its allies and partners is unacceptable, and will result in the end of whatever regime were to take such an action." The so-called Washington Declaration came after nearly 50 years had passed since Korea signed the Nuclear Non-Proliferation Treaty and gave up its nuclear ambitions.

In August 2024 The US and South Korea South Korea initiated military exercises, to boost their joint readiness to fend off North Korea's weapons and cyber threats.

On 9 October 2024, South Korean Defence Minister Kim Yong-hyun called for enhanced joint military drills with the U.S. to ensure a strong defence against North Korean threats. In talks with U.S. Admiral Samuel Paparo, they agreed to hold a second "Freedom Edge" exercise and expressed concerns about the security risks posed by North Korea-Russia military collaboration.

On November 6, 2024, South Korea's presidential office said on Wednesday that it will build a "perfect" security partnership with a new U.S. administration. Seoul is a strong U.S. ally in the region, with around 28,500 American troops stationed in South Korea.

In February 2025, the U.S. and South Korean militaries conducted their first joint air drill of President Donald Trump's second term, featuring at least one U.S. B-1B bomber along with South Korean F-35 and F-15 jets and U.S. F-16s. Germany, US, South Korean, and Japanese diplomats reaffirmed military cooperation and sanctions to counter North Korea’s nuclear ambitions. North Korea condemned the USA, South Korea, and Japan for pursuing denuclearization, vowing to expand its nuclear arsenal under Kim Jong Un's leadership.

On March 2, 2025, the U.S. aircraft carrier USS Carl Vinson arrived in Busan, marking the first such visit since President Donald Trump's second term began in January. The visit, part of extended deterrence efforts, was accompanied by the USS Princeton and USS Sterett. Rear Admiral Michael S. Wosje emphasized joint training to strengthen ties. North Korea, which recently tested strategic cruise missiles, has condemned U.S. military deployments.

== Nuclear and missile diplomacy ==
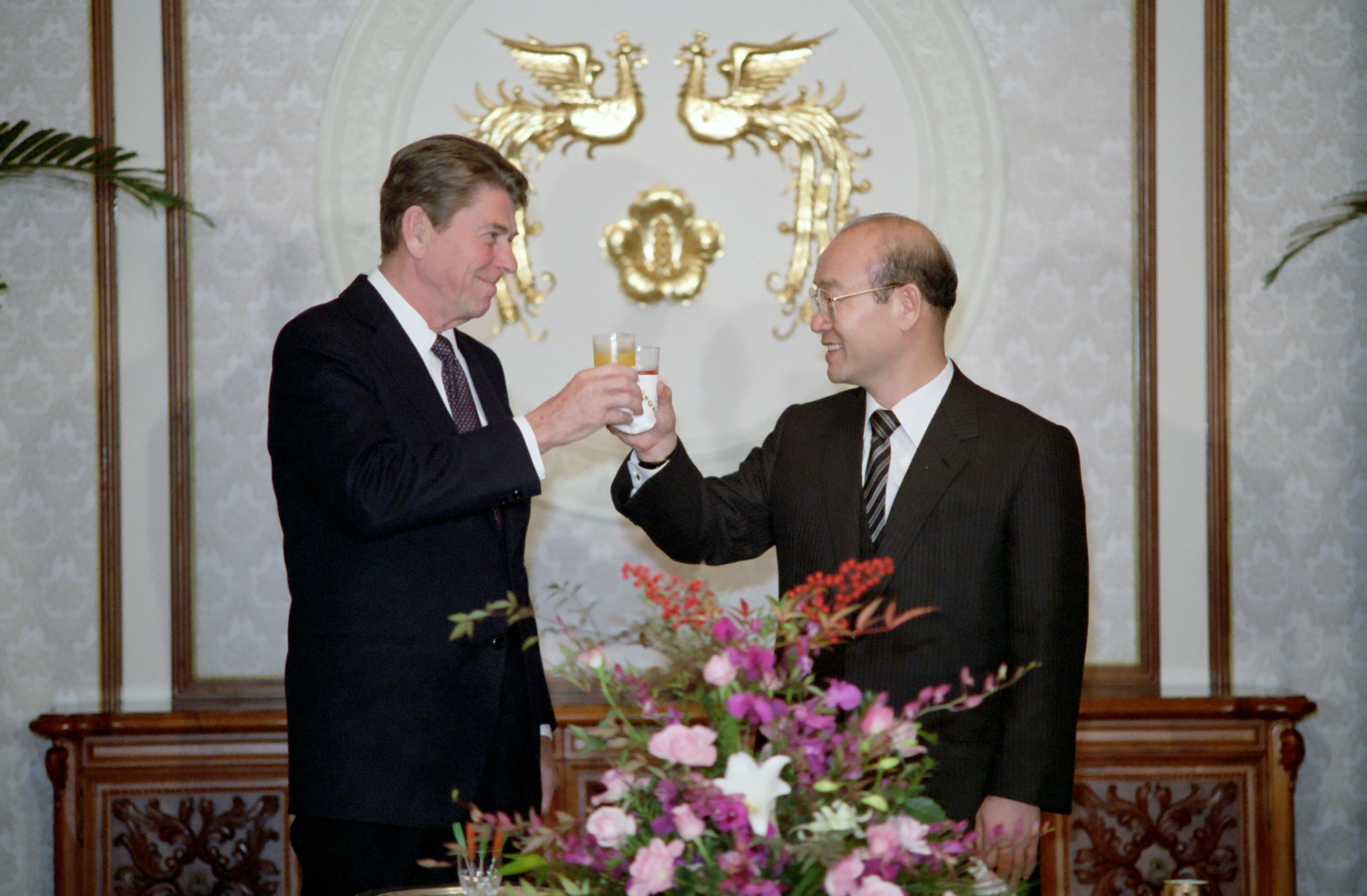
South Korean President Chun Doo Hwan with U.S. President Ronald Reagan, November 1983

Between 1958 and 1991, the United States based a variety of nuclear weapons in South Korea. The number reached a peak of 950 warheads in 1967. Since 1991, when President George H. W. Bush announced the withdrawal of all tactical nuclear weapons based abroad, the Korean peninsula has seen ongoing efforts by the U.S. to negotiate an end to North Korea's own nuclear and missile development. These efforts have been characterized by "stalemates, crises and tentative progress." Despite the ongoing tensions, the U.S. has not redeployed nuclear weapons, although one recent press report suggests a majority of South Koreans are in favor of developing their own nuclear weapons. South Korea announced the deployment of the Terminal High Altitude Area Defense anti-ballistic missile defense system at the end of 2017.

== Opinion polls ==
According to Pew Research Center in 2026, 45% of South Koreans have a favorable view towards the United States, while 55% have an unfavorable opinion. On the political side, the United States supported South Korea after 1945 as a "staunch bastion against communism", even when the ROK itself was ruled by a US-backed dictatorship. According to Pew Research Center in 2026, 77% of South Koreans have little or no confidence on U.S. President Donald Trump, while 22% have some or a lot of confidence. In 2025, a poll by the Korea Institute for National Unification showed that 65.7% of South Koreans agreed that the United States "does not consider South Korea’s interests". According to a KStatResearch poll in October 2025, 56% of South Koreans had favorable opinions of the United States, while 40% had a negative opinion; most commonly cited reasons for negative opinions were Trump administration's erratic policies (46%), economic burden imposed by the US (26%), and the America First policy (20%). Additionally, only 27% of respondents said that "some national interests should be sacrificed" for the sake of the alliance with the United States, while 68% responded that "national interests should be the top priority".

As relations with Korea waxed hot and cold under President Donald Trump, American public opinion regarding North Korea likewise fluctuated sharply, and no clear picture emerges.

== Economic relations ==
US companies were actively involved in the development of the South Korean automotive industry. After Hyundai entered the automobile business in 1967, Ford provided technical assistance. A joint venture between General Motors and Shinjin Motor Company began car production in 1972.

In the 1980s, there were dozens of agreements in which US semiconductor companies sold or licensed chip technology to South Korean companies. The transfers occurred amidst the dominance of Japanese companies and a slump in the industry.

In 2011, President Lee Myung-bak signed the United States–Korea Free Trade Agreement.

US policy under Joe Biden such as the 2022 Inflation Reduction Act (IRA) and CHIPS and Science Act attracted South Korean businesses in industries such as electric vehicles, batteries, semiconductors, and solar panels to build production facilities in the US. These investments were mainly in southern states. Although the IRA initially created discord in relations, the US government accommodated South Korean corporate interests. Donald Trump, however, revoked most Biden-era tax credits in the One Big Beautiful Bill Act, replacing them with tariffs. Various joint ventures between US automakers and South Korean battery makers were consequently dissolved. In September 2025, the US government detained hundreds of South Korean nationals in a raid of a Hyundai-LG battery plant in Georgia state. A poll found that a majority of South Koreans surveyed found the crackdown to be excessive.

“Halt investments in the U.S. immediately. Restore the dignity of the workers. If not, this will inevitably happen again,” said Um Mi-kyung, the KCTU’s acting secretary general. “We will fight to the very end to put an end to these U.S. investments that are destroying Korea’s domestic economy and dismantling our manufacturing industry.”

The South Korean government's response to Coupang's 2025 data breach created tension with the US government.

South Korea's export-driven economy and competition with domestic U.S. producers in certain fields of products have led to some trade friction with the United States. For example, imports of certain steel and non-steel products have been subject to U.S. anti-dumping and countervailing duty investigations. A total of 29 U.S. imports from South Korea have been assessed. There have also been major trade disputes between South Korea and the U.S. in areas such as telecommunications, automotive industry, intellectual property rights issues, pharmaceutical industry, and the agricultural industry.

=== Trade volume ===
U.S. trade deficit (in billions, goods only) by country in 2014

South Korea Exports to United States was US$110.17 Billion during 2022, according to the United Nations COMTRADE database on international trade. In 2022, South Korea mainly exported Vehicles other than railway and tramway to the United States.

US-South Korea goods trade in billions of U.S. dollars (1985−2025)
	1985	1990	1995	2000	2005	2010	2015	2020	2025
US exports to South Korea	6.0	14.4	25.4	27.8	27.6	38.8	43.5	51.0	57.5
US imports from South Korea	10.0	18.5	24.2	40.3	43.8	48.9	71.8	76.0	104.7
Trade balance	−4.0	−4.1	1.2	−12.5	−16.2	−10.1	−28.3	−25.0	−47.2

=== Direct investment ===
The U.S. (US$8.73 billion) is one of the top destinations for Korean FDI.

== Space cooperation ==
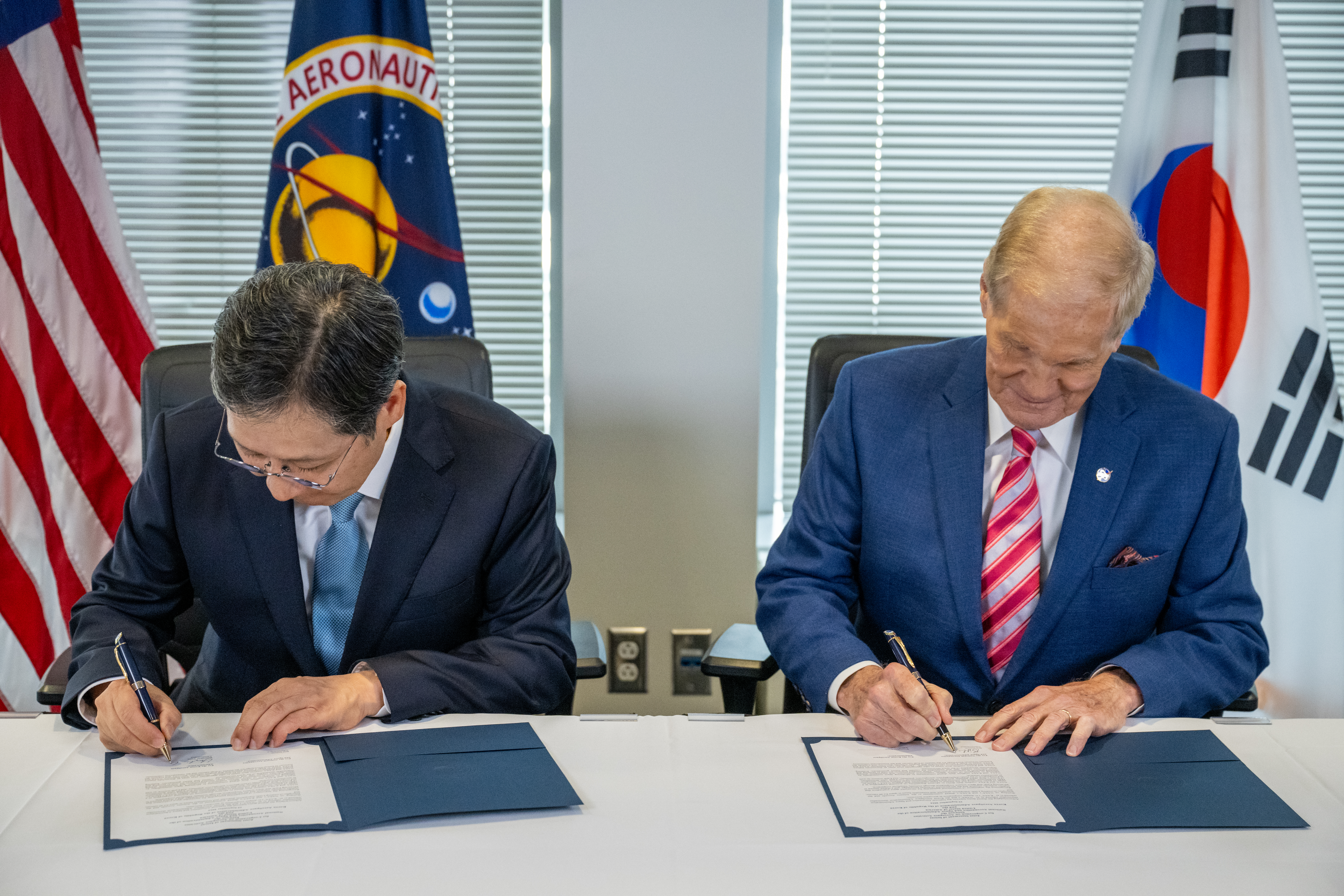
Bilateral meeting and joint statement signing between the Korea AeroSpace Administration (KASA) and NASA

The two countries are deepening space cooperation by signing a bilateral space agreement in 2016. In April 2023, President Yoon visited the Goddard Space Flight Center with U.S. Vice President Kamala Harris, and agreed to work to strengthen the space alliance between South Korea and the United States. In July 2024, Pamela Melroy, Deputy Administrator of the NASA, visited South Korea to discuss space cooperation.

== Cultural exchange ==
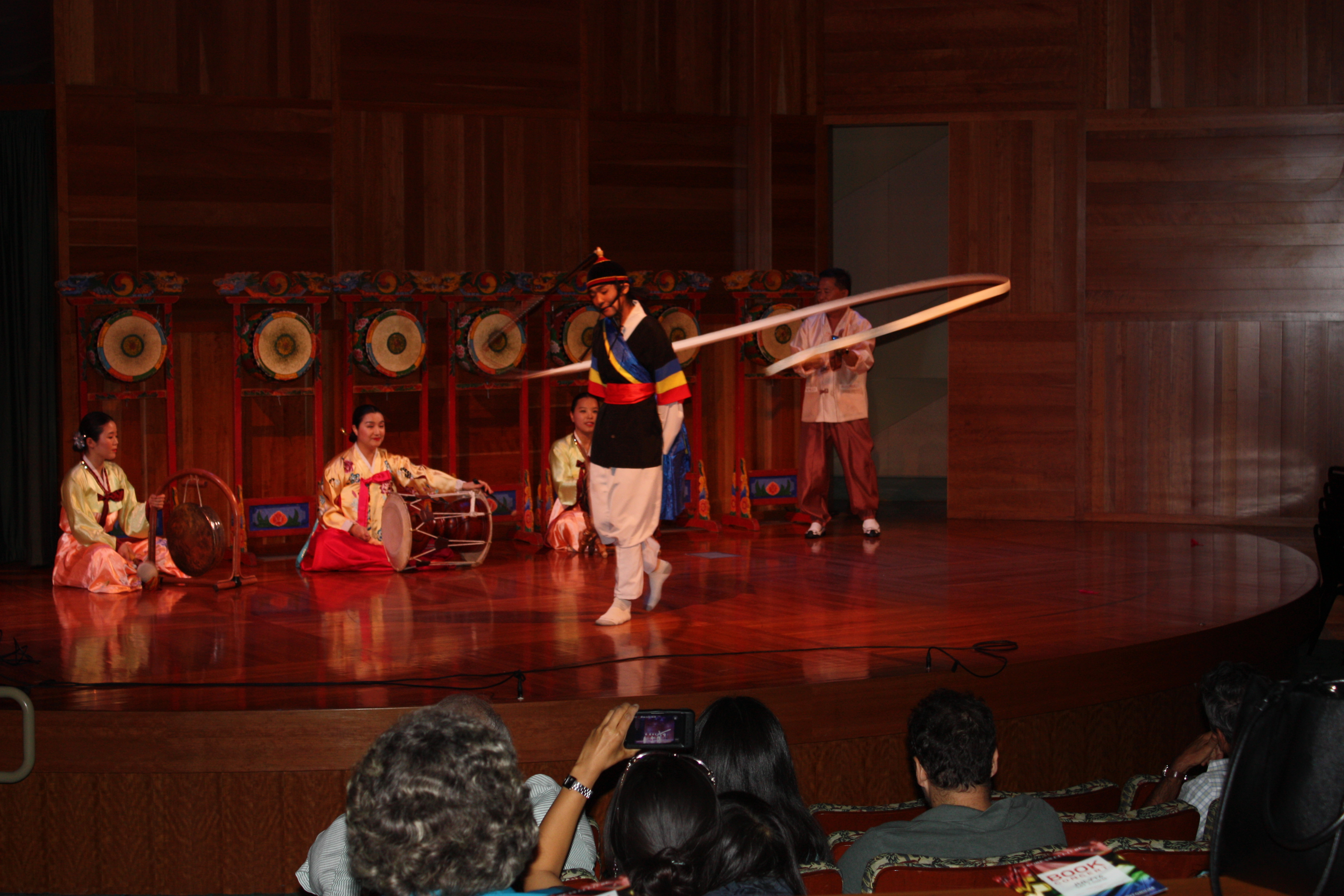
Korean Cultural Center in Los Angeles in 2011

The South Korean government maintains Korean cultural education centers in Wheeling, Illinois (in the northwest suburbs of Chicago), Houston, New York City, Los Angeles, San Francisco, and Washington, D.C.

South Korea has a total of three Korean Cultural Centers in the United States.

- Korean Cultural Center, Los Angeles
- Korean Cultural Center New York
- Korean Cultural Center Washington D.C.

=== K-pop ===
K-pop and Korean cultural festivals are held in the U.S. regularly across different regions. KCON, the world's largest Hallyu (Korean Wave) festival (organized by CJ ENM), surpassed 1.5 million cumulative on-site visitors by the 18th edition. The achievement came 11 years after its first event in Irvine, California in 2012 and just 4 years after it reached the milestone of 1 million attendees in 2019.

As of 2023, The U.S. is one of the top three countries for K-pop albums.

=== Korean language education ===
Korean language is one of the only three in the U.S. university foreign language enrollment rate to rise from 2016 to 2021. The number of Korean language learners increased from 13,900 in 2016 to 19,300 in 2021.

== Gallery ==
=== Submits and state visits ===
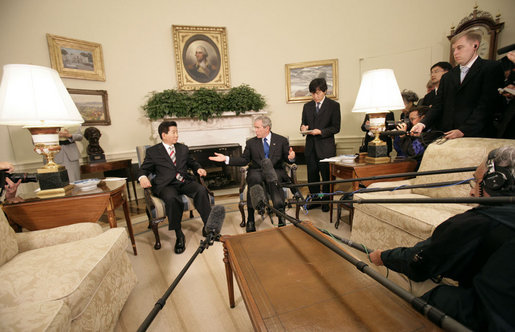
President Roh Moo-hyun and George W. bush in September 2006

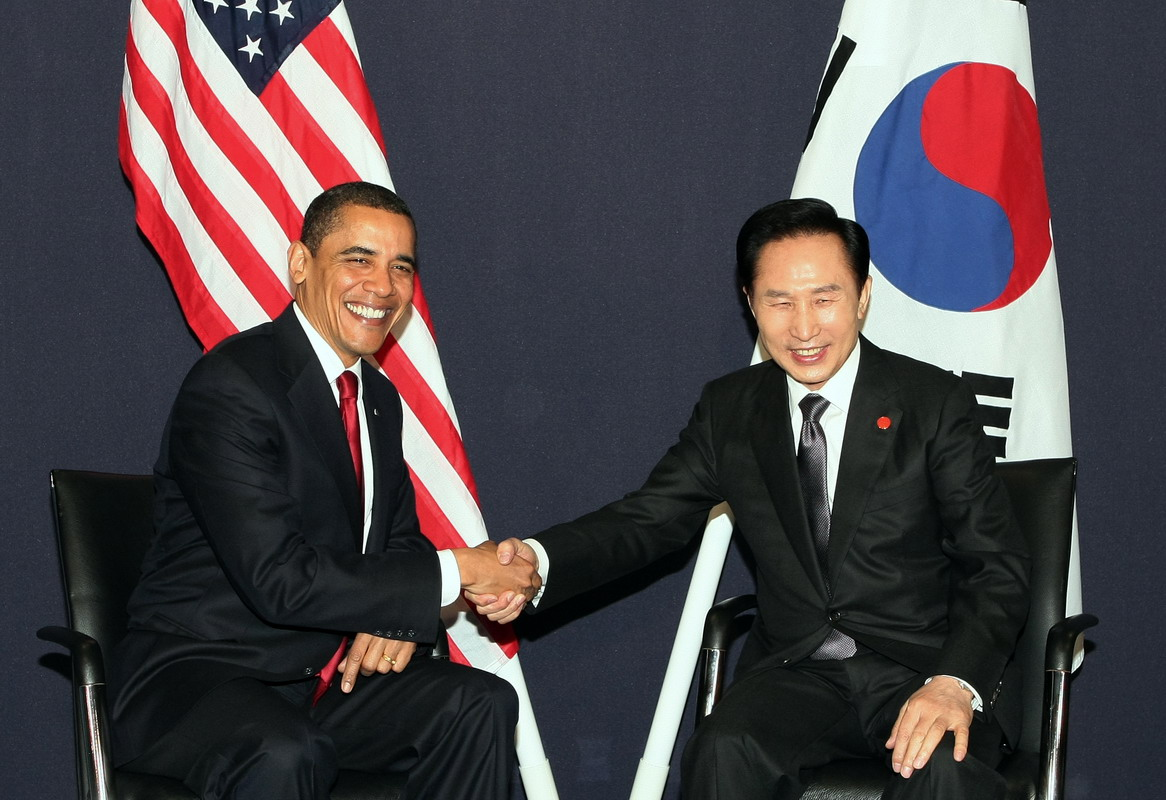
President Lee Myung-bak and Barack Obama in April 2009

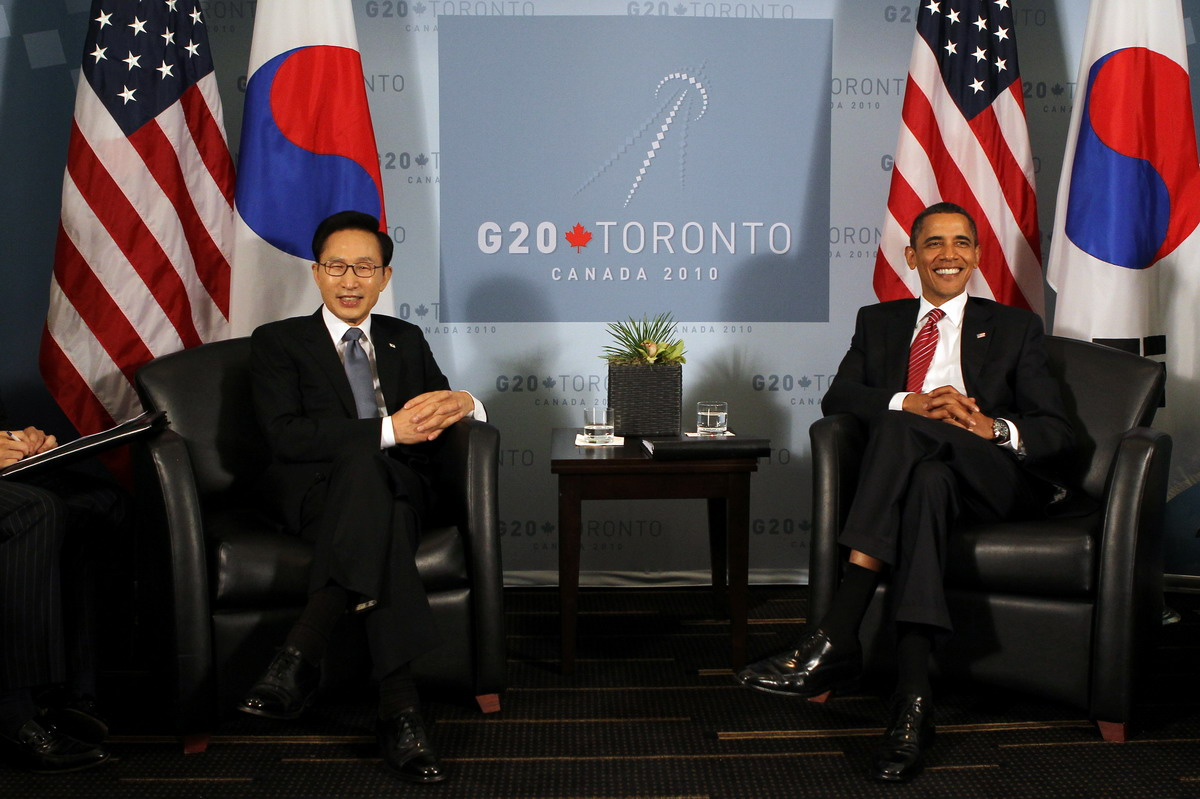
President Lee Myung-bak and Barack Obama in June 2010

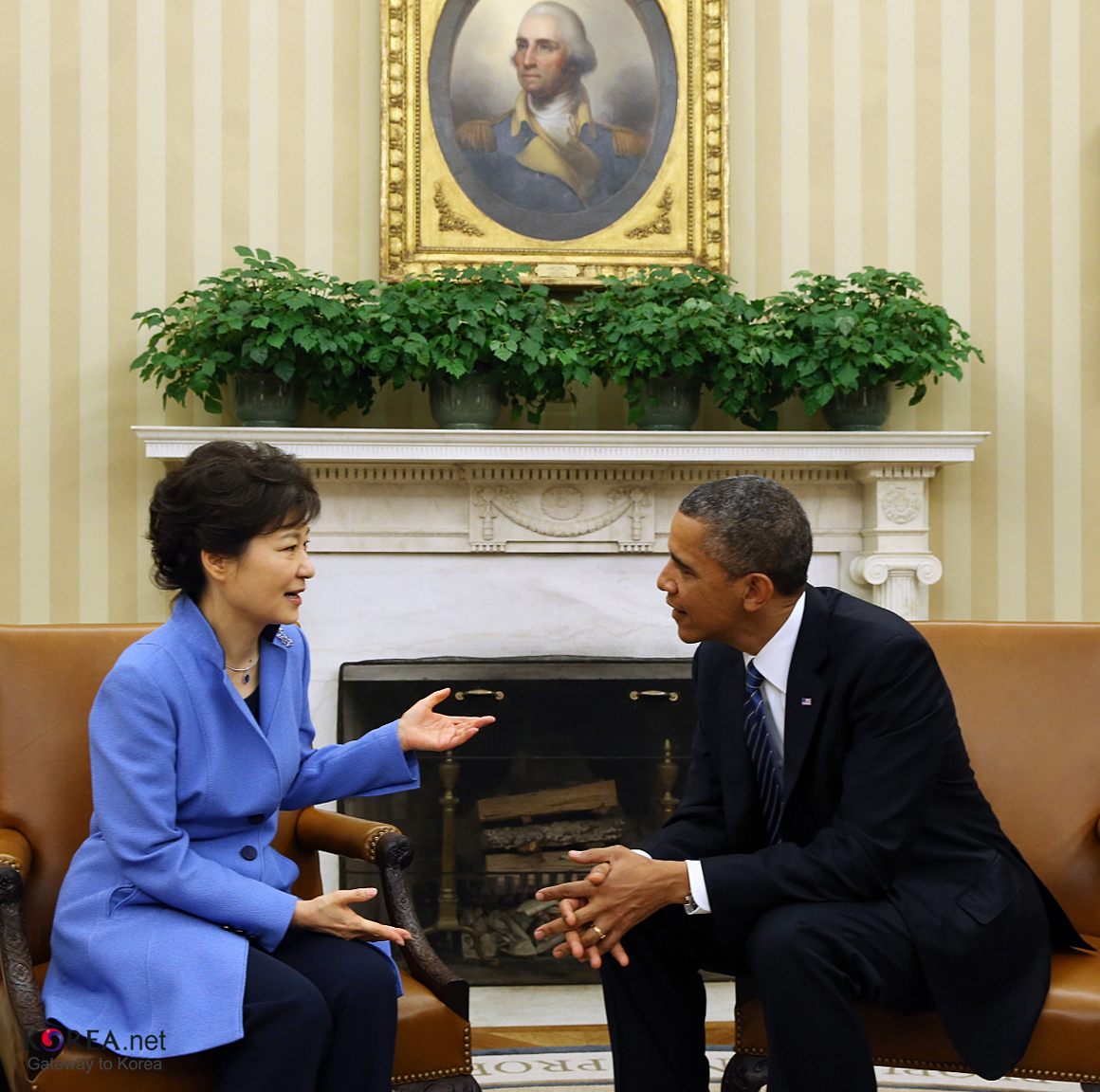
President Park Geun-hye and Barack Obama in May 2013

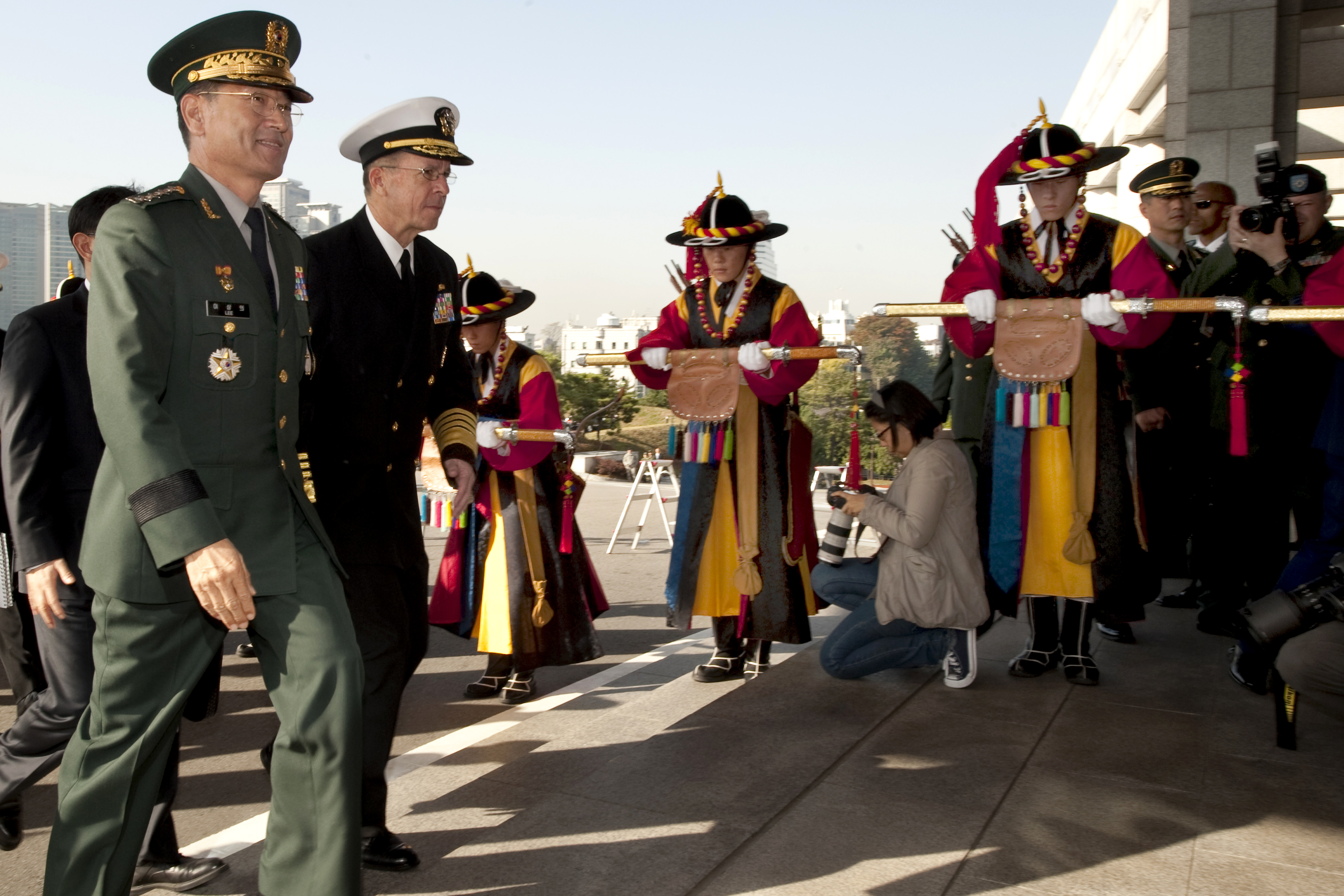
Army General Lee Sang-Eui, chairman of the Joint Chiefs of Staff welcomes US Navy Admiral Michael Mullen, chairman of the Joint Chiefs of Staff

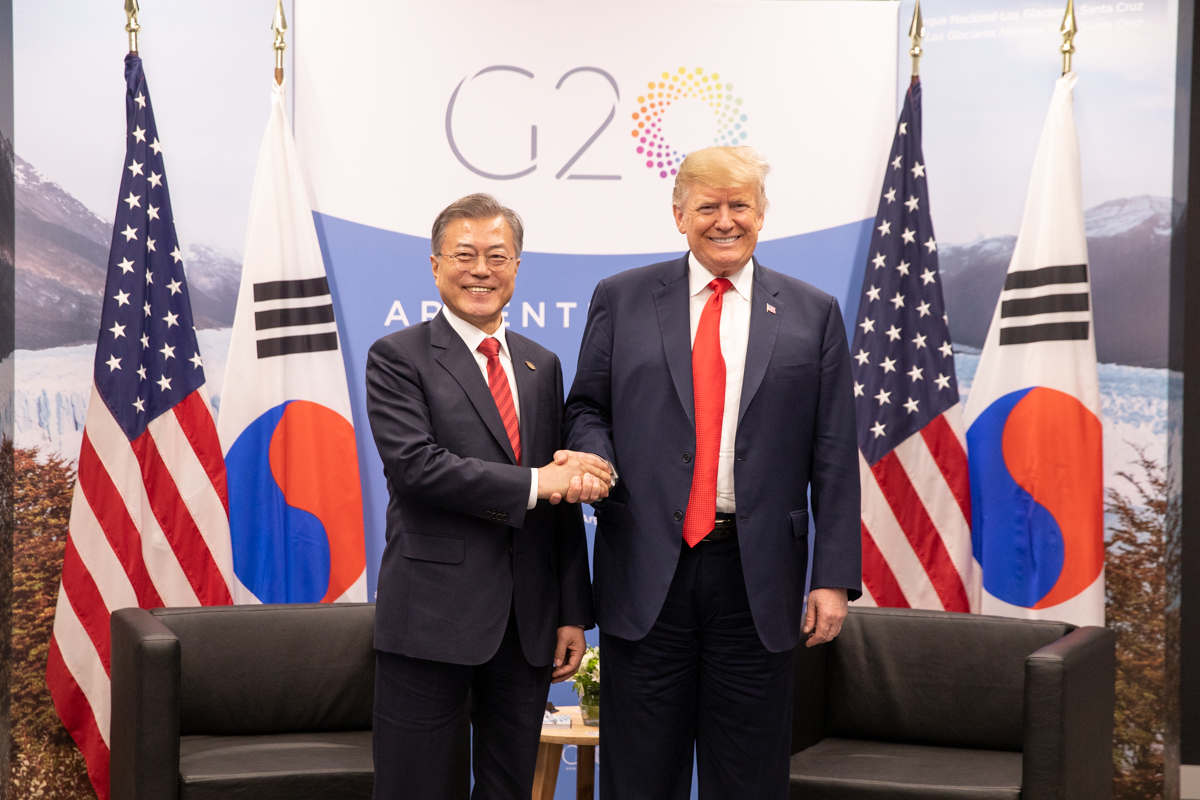
President Moon Jae-in and President Donald Trump in November 2018

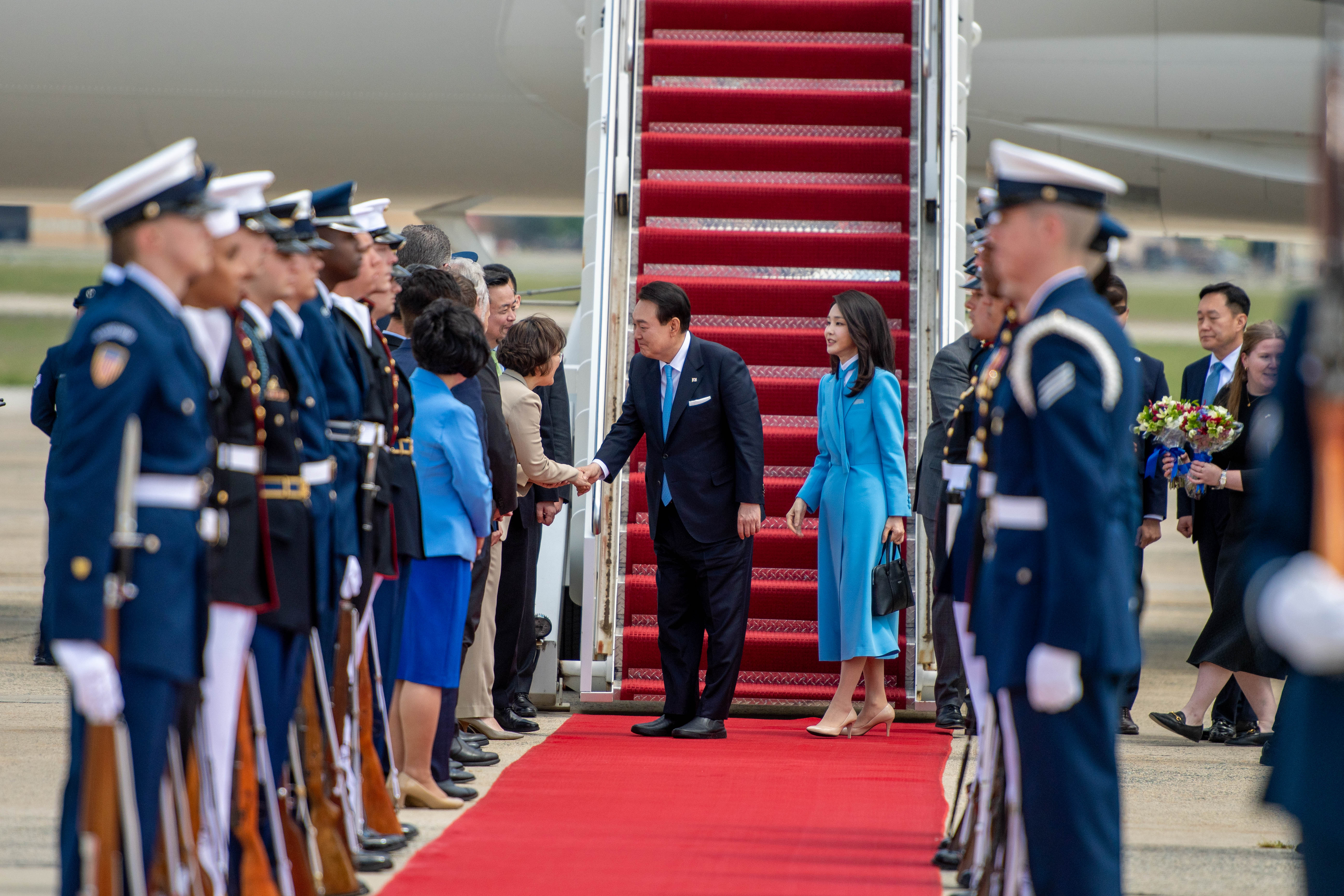
Welcome of President Yoon Suk Yeol to the United States (2023)

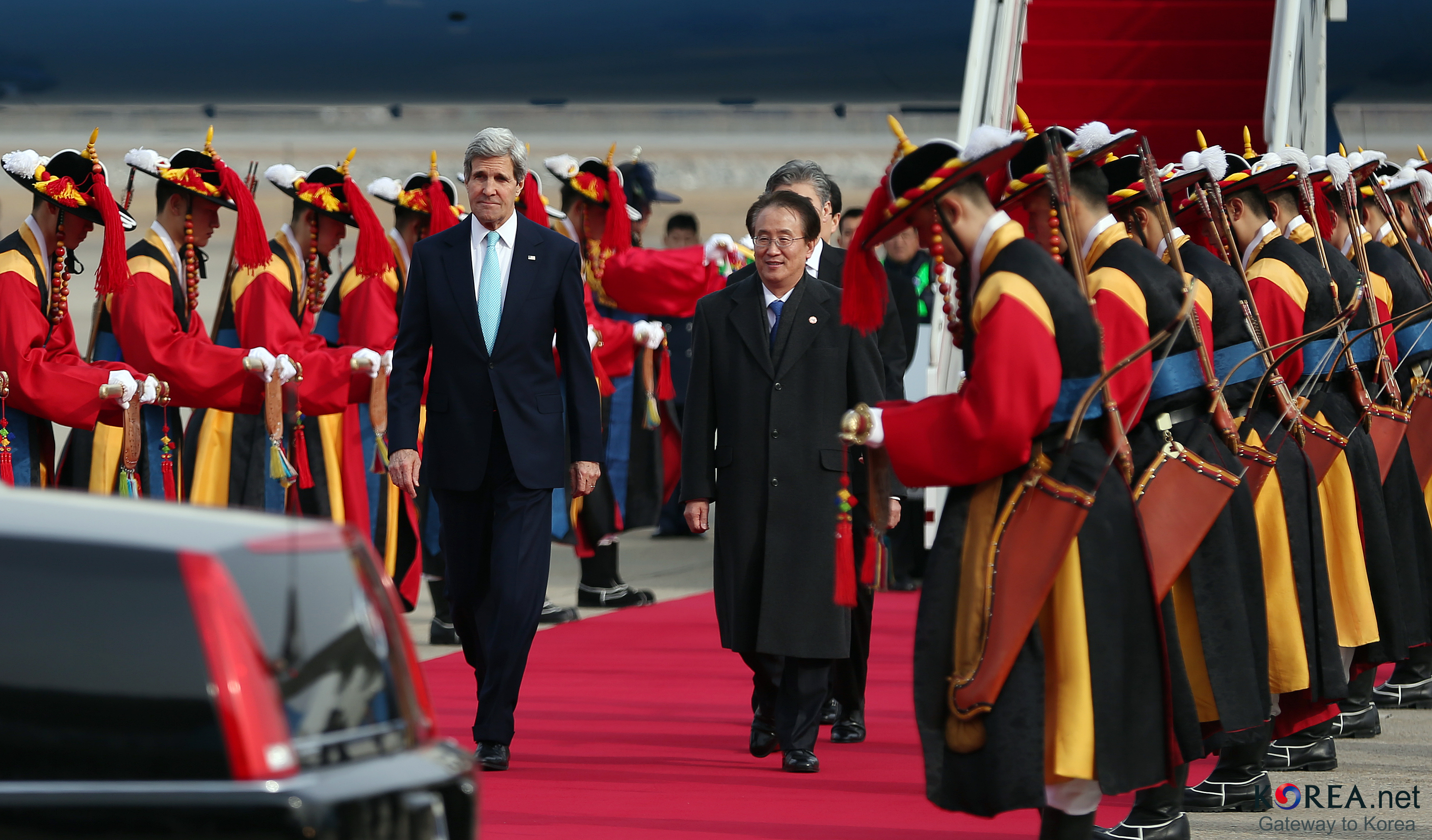
Welcome of US Secretary of State John Kerry to South Korea (2014)

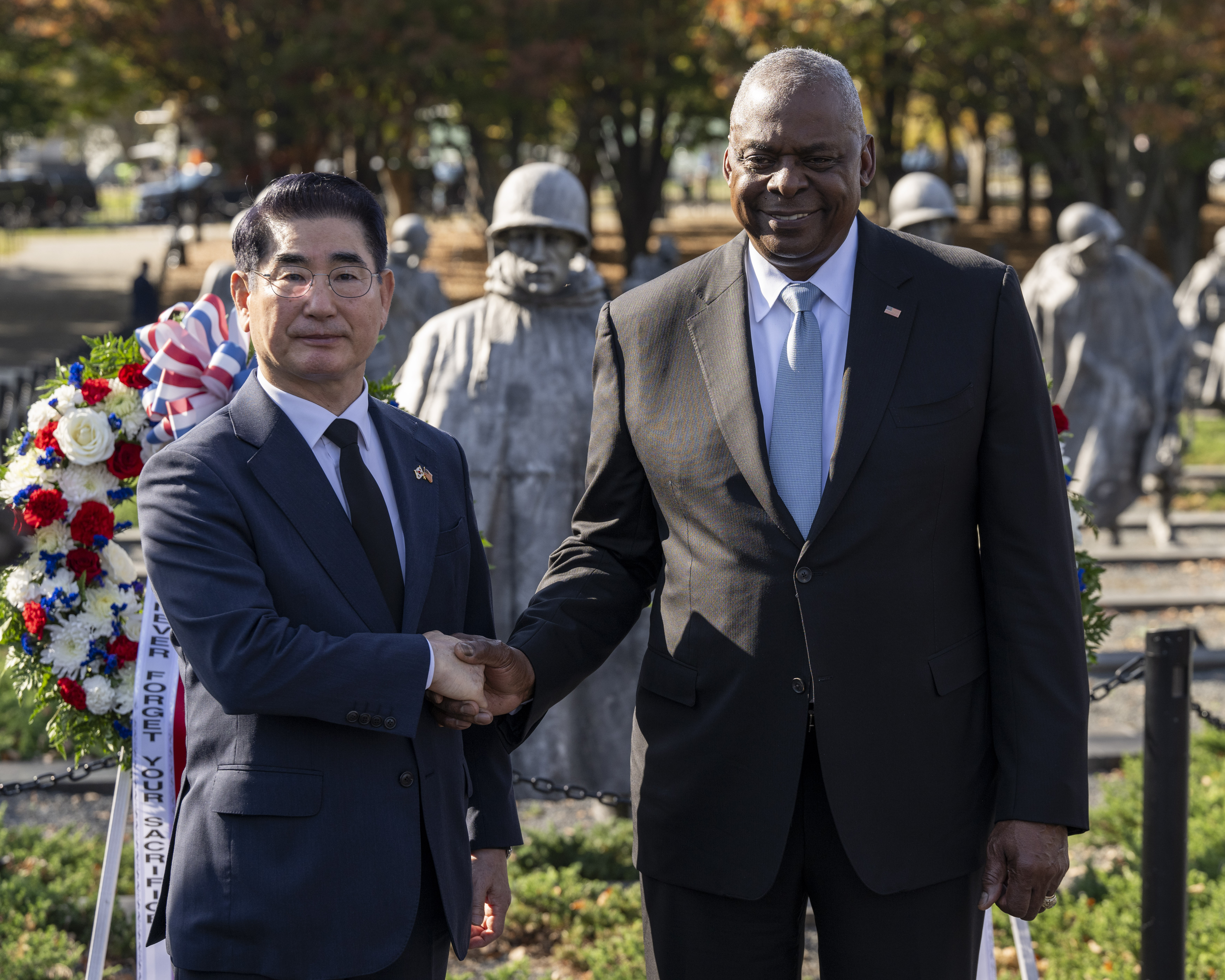
Secretary Lloyd Austin and Minister Kim Yong-hyun participate in a wreath-laying ceremony at the Korean War Veterans Memorial in October 2024

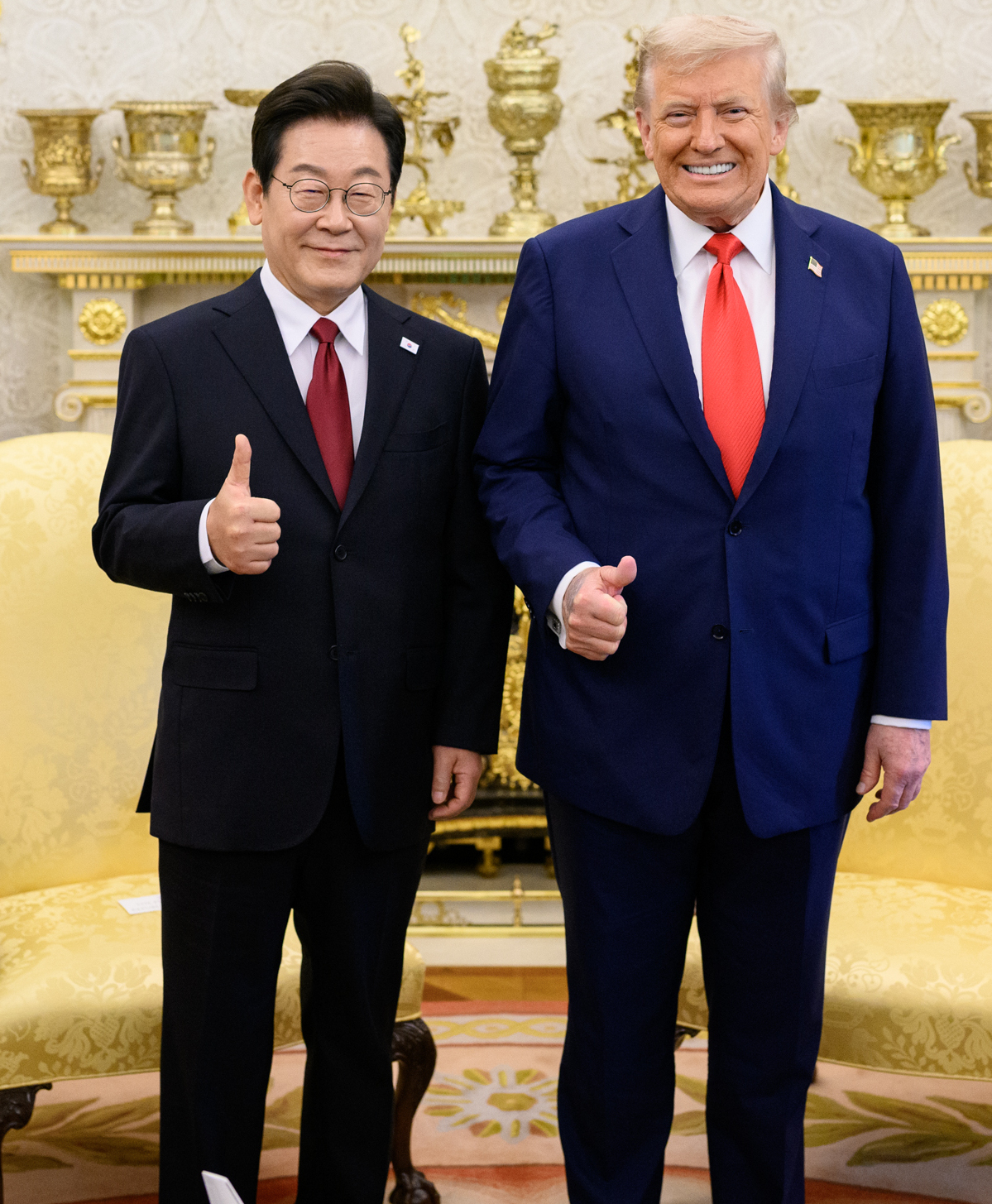
President Donald Trump and President Lee Jae Myung in August 2025

=== Koreatown ===
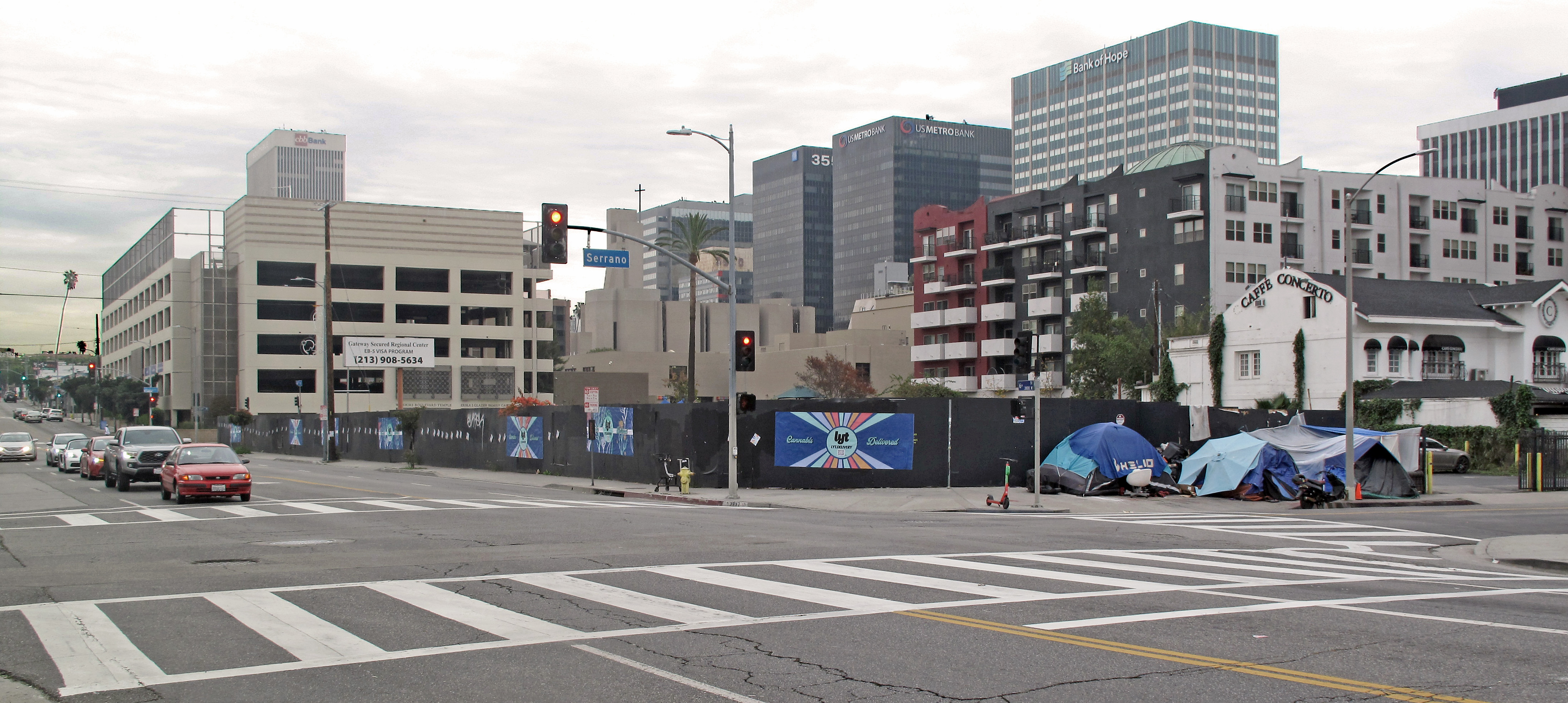
Korea Town (called also K Town) in Los Angeles

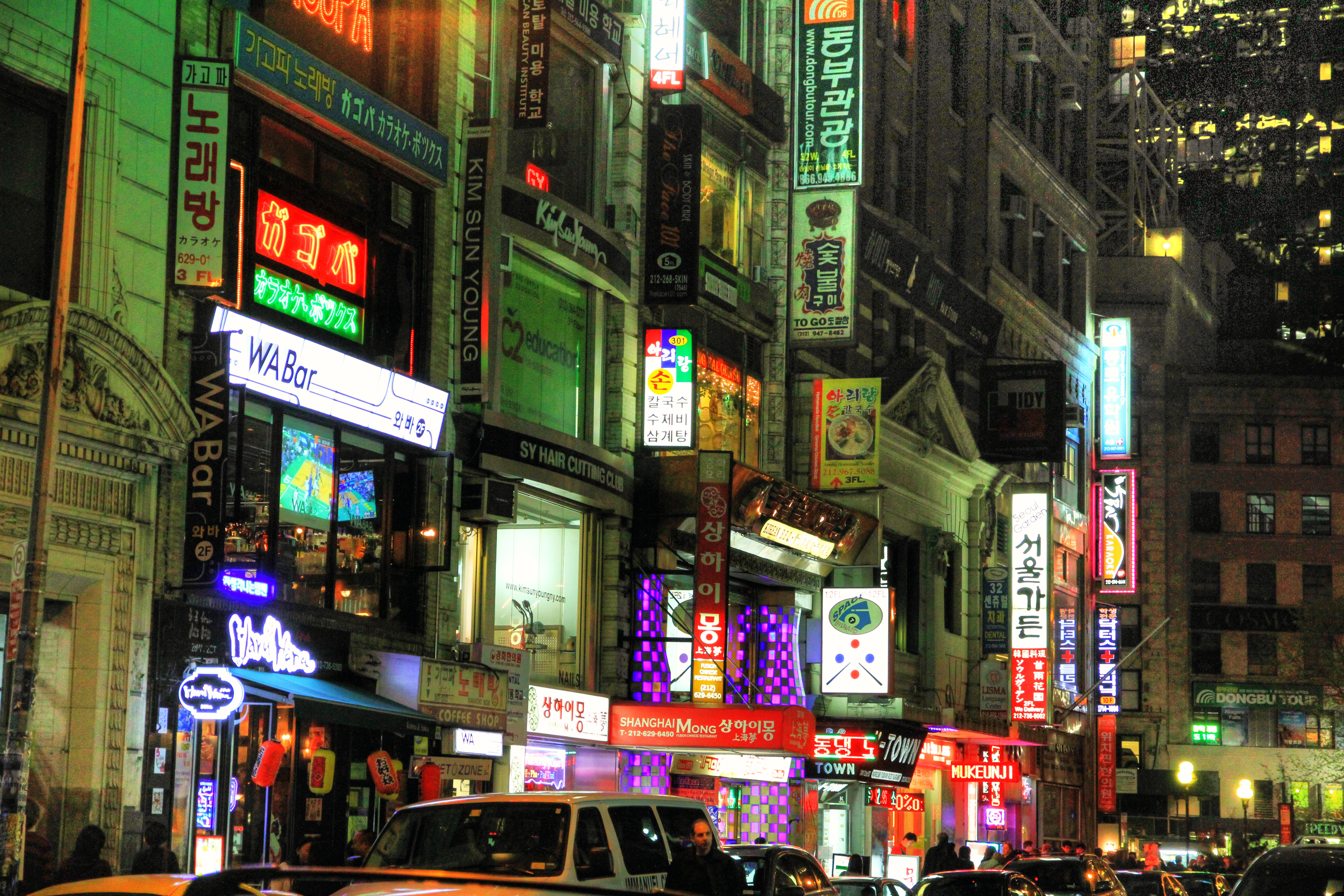
Koreatown, Manhattan

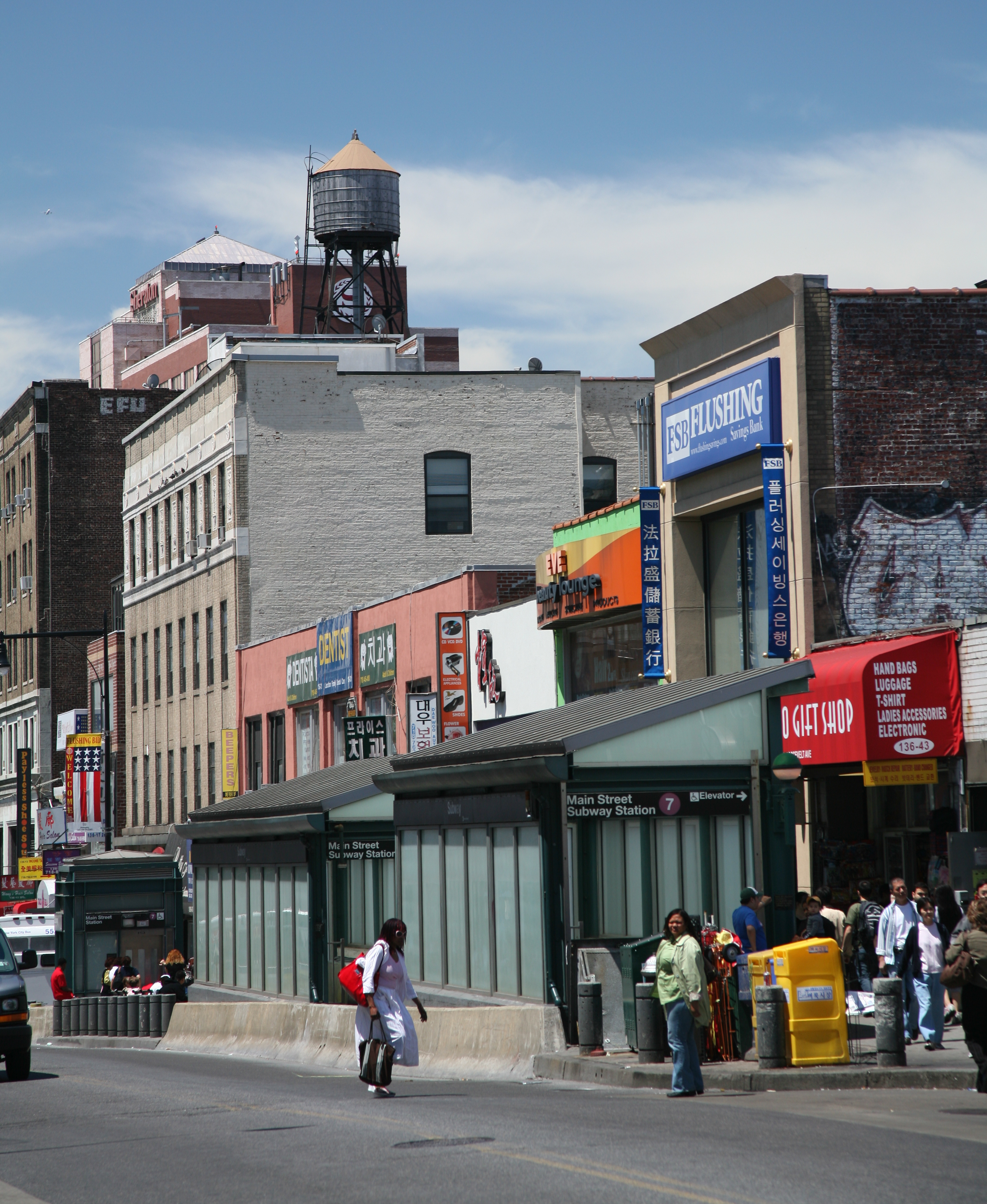
Koreatown, Queens

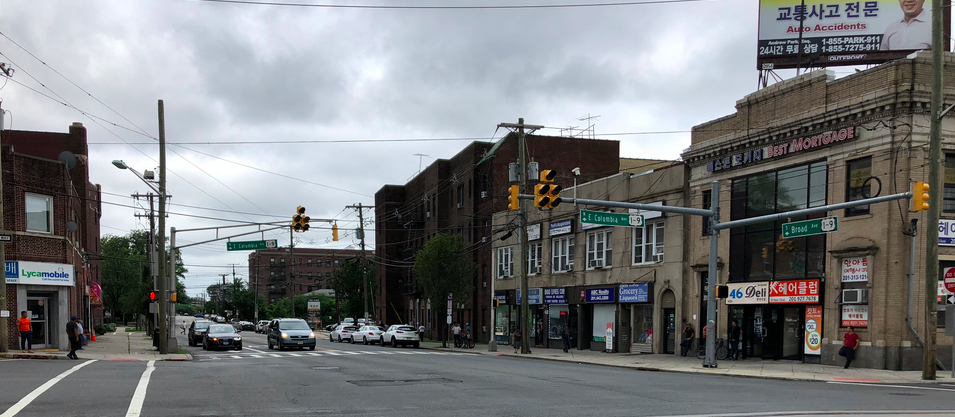
Bergen County, New Jersey

=== Kpop concerts ===
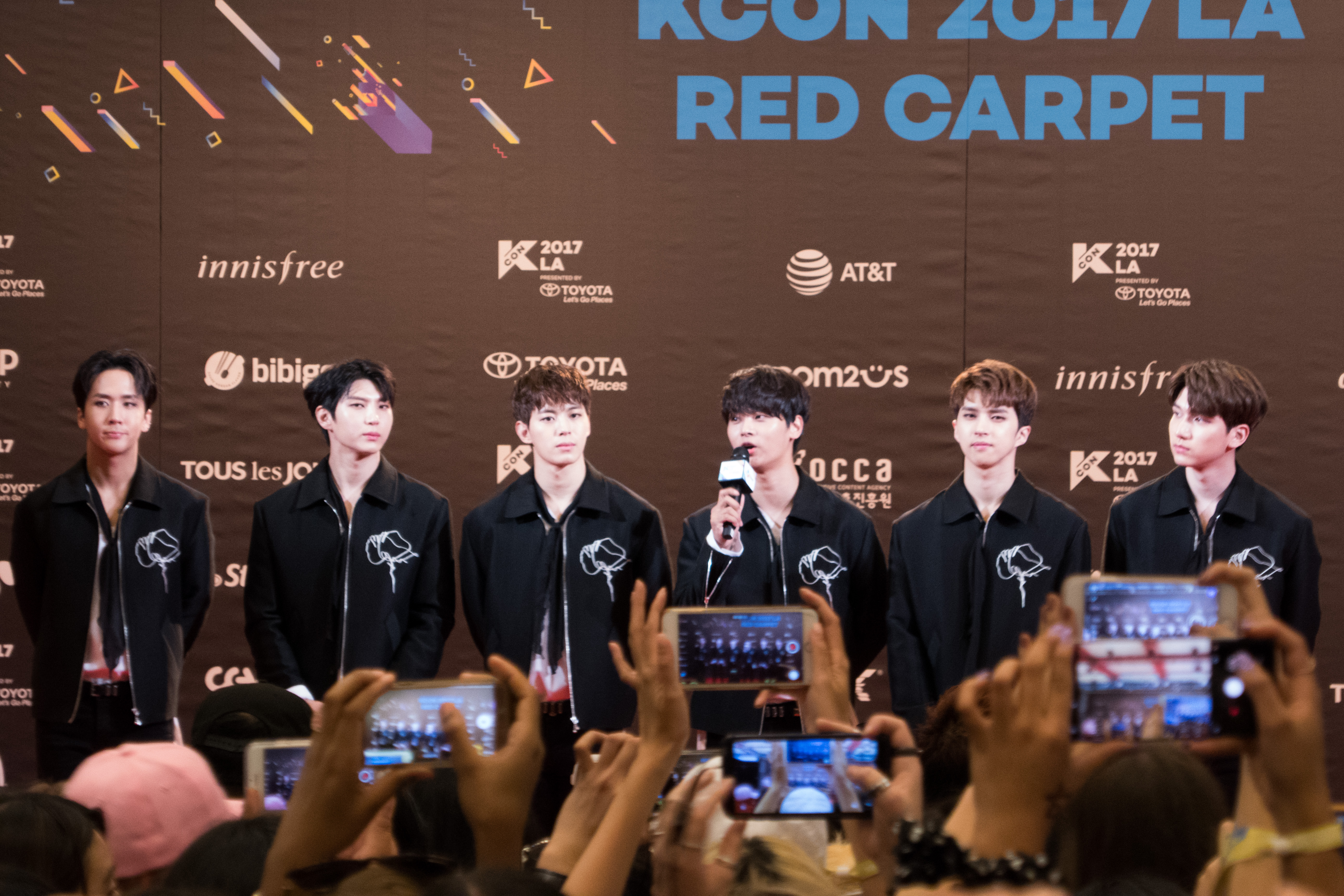
VIXX at KCON 2017 Los Angeles

== See also ==
- Korean Americans
- United States–Korea Free Trade Agreement
- United States Army Military Government in Korea (USAMGIK, 1945–1948)
- Six-party talks
