= Nigeria–South Korea relations =

- Nigeria: South Korea

Diplomatic mission
- Embassy of Nigeria, Seoul: Embassy of Korea, Lagos

Nigeria and South Korea have had formal diplomatic ties since February 1980. Bilateral trade volume reached US$1.27 billion in 2020. By that year, Nigeria was South Korea's third-largest trading partner in Africa. South Korean firms are working to build liquefied natural gas facilities in Nigeria, as well as infrastructure to transport and store crude oil.

In 2006, South Korean president Roh Moo-hyun visited Nigeria's capital Abuja. Nigerian president Goodluck Jonathan visited South Korea to attend the 2012 Nuclear Security Summit.

In May 2010, the Korean Cultural Center, Nigeria was established in Abuja. It is a branch of the Korean Cultural Centers that are operated by the Korean Culture and Information Service. The center hosts various cultural exchange programs, including taekwondo lessons, vocal training, and Korean language classes and competitions.
