= Korean Cultural Center, Nigeria =

South Korean organization in Abuja

The Korean Cultural Center, Nigeria (KCCN; Korean: 한국문화원 나이지리아) is a branch of the Korean Cultural Centers located in Abuja, Nigeria. It was established in May 2010. As with the other Korean Cultural Centers, it is operated by the Korean Culture and Information Service (KOCIS), which is operated by the South Korean government.

The center hosts various cultural events for the general public. For example, in September 2023 for the Chuseok holiday, the center hosted taekwondo (Korean martial art) classes. It also hosts Korean language and speaking classes and contests. The center runs an annual music and art mentorship program, where South Korean talent provide mentorship to Nigerian talent. It also hosts K-pop dance classes.

== See also ==
- Nigeria–South Korea relations
