= Korean Cultural Center New York =

Cultural center in New York City

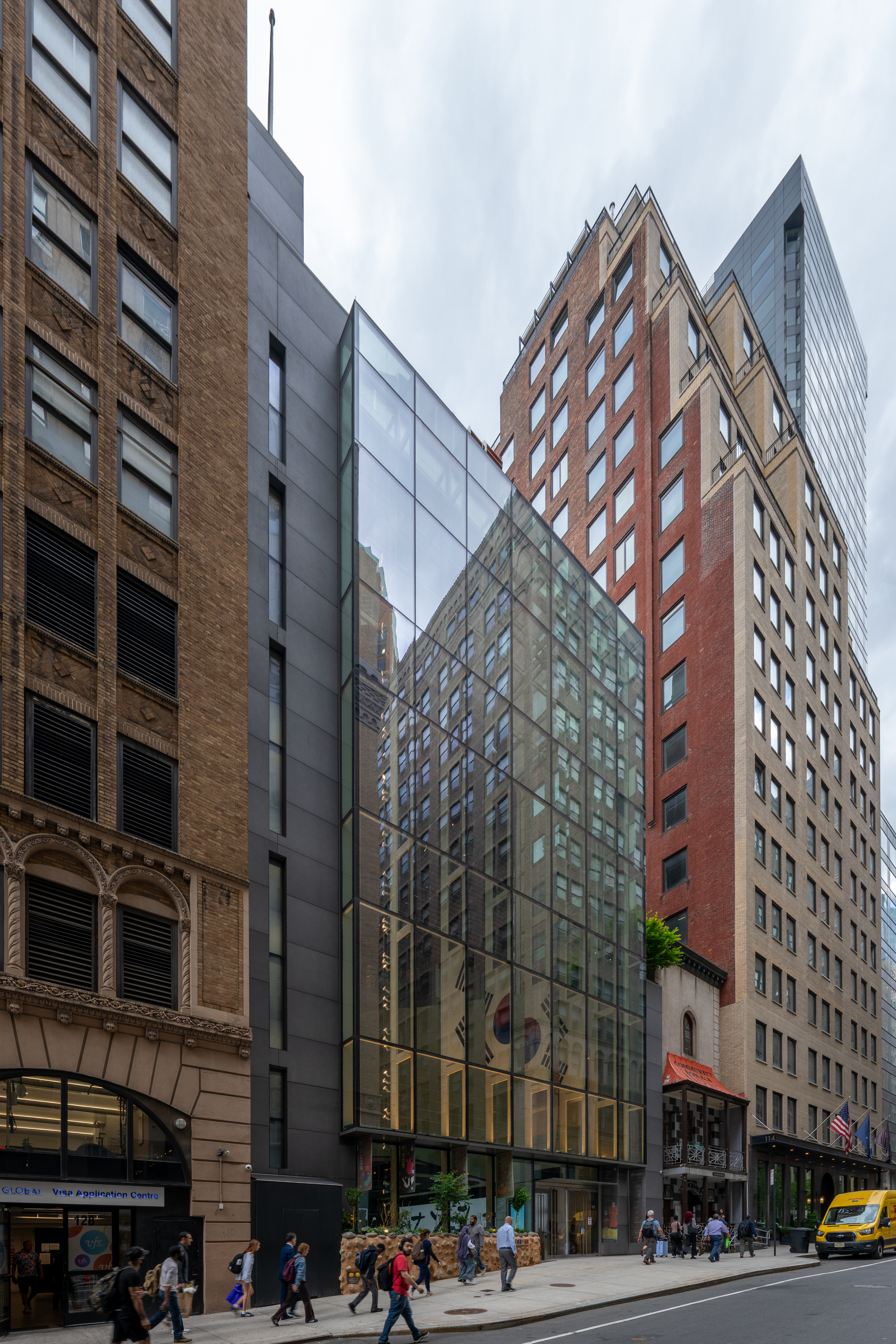

- Location within New York
- Alternative names: Korean Cultural Service New York (Previous)

General information
- Type: Cultural Center
- Location: 122 E 32nd Street, New York, NY 10016, New York City, United States
- Coordinates: 40.7620°N 73.9710°W
- Completed: 1979
- Client: Korean Ministry of Culture, Sports and Tourism
- Owner: Ministry of Culture, Sports, and Tourism of the Republic of South Korea

Website
- www.koreanculture.org

The Korean Cultural Center New York (KCCNY; Korean: 뉴욕한국문화원) is a branch of the Korean Cultural Centers aligned with the South Korean government and located in New York City, New York, United States.

Inaugurated in December 1979, KCCNY works to establish and promote Korean culture and aesthetics in New York through diverse cultural and artistic activities including gallery exhibitions, performing arts concerts, film festivals, and educational programs. The current executive director is Cheon-soo Kim.

== History ==
The Korean Culture and Information Service launched in 1971 as an arm of the Ministry of Culture, Sports, and Tourism to serve as a communication bridge to promote Korea overseas and shed light on international cultural exchanges. As of 2017, it is operating 31 cultural centers in 28 countries around the world, with the Korean Cultural Center New York being inaugurated in 1979.

Since its opening, KCCNY has focused its efforts on broadening the understanding of Koreans and supporting the relationship between South Korea and the United States through cultural activities and events. It faced many limitations early on, but is now equipped with improved facilities and strong relations with global institutions and local organizations in New York that aids in the center's expanding roles.

== Slogan ==
The official slogan of KCCNY is “A Korea In New York,” which symbolizes the center's desire to promote Korean content to the communities in New York and surrounding area. The need for this slogan was recognized due to the overall lack of awareness of Korea and Korean culture throughout the US. With “A Korea in New York,” KCCNY aims to proactively share “Korea” in a manner that can best contribute and give back to New York and the United States as a whole.

== Initiatives ==
As part of an effort to spread and promote Korean culture throughout the city of New York, KCCNY organizes many programs and events under diverse categories.

=== Film ===
KCCNY annually presents “Korean Movie Night New York,” a program consisting of free film screenings showcasing specially curated Korean films ranging from top grossing hits to recent indie releases. In addition, KCCNY is in support of the New York Asian Film Festival and hosts exciting programs, such as "Master Series," to further share Korean film to US audiences.

=== Performing Arts ===
KCCNY engages and promotes diverse performing arts events that can introduce both traditional and modern dance, music, and Korean aesthetic styles to New York. The Performing Arts department aims to provide a stage for top performing artists ranging from time-honored court music performances to rising contemporary dance programs who can reinterpret, localize, and globalize Korean traditional music-inspired performances that exemplify the highest tier of performance.

=== Sports ===
KCCNY proudly supports athletes of all Korean sports as well as athletes of Korean background active in the world. 2017 and 2018 are particularly exciting years as the world prepares for the 2018 Winter Olympics and Paralympics hosted by Pyeongchang, South Korea. The official games will take place from February 9 to 25, and KCCNY will be hosting various programs and campaigns in New York in support of the upcoming Olympics.

=== Cuisine ===
KCCNY is the annual host and sponsor of top Korean food competitions such as the Global Taste of Korea Contest. In addition, KCCNY holds special workshops featuring top chefs showcasing Korean cooking techniques and cuisine that shares the depth and flavors of Korea.

=== Library/Education ===
The library located inside the Korean Cultural Center New York location holds a collection of over 20,000 books and DVDs in both English and Korean. It is open to the public and its materials are available online.

=== Exhibition ===
Gallery exhibitions are organized by Gallery Korea, a division within KCCNY. Artists of various backgrounds and disciplines have presented their artwork in line with the mission to promote cultural exchange through art. Past exhibitions include "Haenyeo" "The Movement of HERstory: Korean Embroidery" and "Re:visioning HANJI".

On March 17, 2021, the exhibition “Creation Continua: Park Joon Photo Portraits of Korean Artist Diaspora in Greater New York” opened at KCCNY, as part of Asia Week New York 2021. The exhibition displays photographs of 50 Korean immigrant artists who came to the U.S. in the late 20th century. The portraits were taken by Korean American photographer, Park Joon, who immigrated to the US in 1984. The exhibition runs until April 30, 2021.

== Directors ==
=== Current ===
Cheon-soo Kim: March 2023

=== Former ===
- Jae Hong Lee: August 18, 1979
- Tae Wan Yoo: April 1, 1981
- Young Mo Ahn: October 16, 1984
- Shin Il Park: July 1, 1985
- Chan Yong Yi: September 1, 1987
- Djun Kil Kim: June 1, 1990
- Young Gil Park: September 10, 1993
- Hong Sok Lee: April 28, 1998
- Byong Suh Lee: March 1, 1999
- Yang Woo Park: August 19, 2002
- Jin Yung Woo: August 8, 2005
- Soo Keun Song: October 11, 2007
- Woo Sung Lee: October 1, 2010
- Seung Je Oh: August 26, 2015

== See also ==
- Korean Cultural Center
