= Korean Cultural Center, Sakhalin =

Center in Yuzhno-Sakhalinsk, Russia

- Корейский культурный центр, Сахалин

General information
- Location: ул 693001, Fizkul'turnaya Ulitsa, 42, Yuzhno-Sakhalinsk, Sakhalin Oblast, Russia, 693001
- Coordinates: 46.9681°N 142.7408°E
- Opened: October 2006
- Cost: ¥500 million

Technical details
- Floor count: 3

The Sakhalin Korean Cultural Center (Russian: Корейский культурный центр, Сахалин; Korean: 사할린한인문화센터) is a branch of the South Korean Korean Cultural Centers in Yuzhno-Sakhalinsk, Sakhalin Oblast, Russia. It is meant for the community of Sakhalin Koreans who have lived on the island since the Japanese colonial period.

== History ==
The foreign ministers of South Korea and Japan agreed to construct the center in November 1997. Japan would fund the construction of the building. There was some controversy around the time of the center's construction. In November 2001, it was reported that Japan wanted the cultural center to be housed in an annex to the Sakhalin Rozina Cultural Center. However, the local Korean residents and the South Korean government protested against this, as they felt it would be too small for the community's needs and that the Rozina Cultural Center was too old and isolated.

The project was managed by the Korean Association of Sakhalin (사할린한인협회). The building cost 500 million yen. The land for the center was leased for 49 years from the Russian government. The rent for the property is partially paid for by the Overseas Koreans Foundation.

It was opened in October 2006. It has two floors above ground and one underground. It houses a number of facilities and organizations for the local residents, including the Korean Association of Sakhalin, a museum, and a medical center.

In 2022, they finished construction on a new sarangbang for the elderly and remodeled their medical facilities. By that year, there were around 30,000 ethnic Koreans on Sakhalin.

The center coordinated the repatriation process for first generation Sakhalin Koreans who wished to go to South Korea.
