= Korean Cultural Center, Los Angeles =

American cultural organization

Korean Cultural Center Los Angeles (KCCLA) (LA한국문화원)
- Founded: April 11, 1980
- Type: Government
- Location: 5505 Wilshire Blvd., Los Angeles California, U.S.
- Key people: Sangwon Jung (정상원)
- Website: www.kccla.org

The Korean Cultural Center Los Angeles (KCCLA) is an annex of the Consulate General of the Republic of Korea in Los Angeles and is operated by the South Korean government's Ministry of Culture, Sports and Tourism. KCCLA's mission is to broaden Korea-U.S. relations through cultural and educational activities.

== History ==
1980: Korean Cultural Center of Los Angeles was founded on April 11, 1980.

1992: The area around was burned in the Rodney King riots, while the center was protected by armed guards.

2001: Reopening of remodeled KCCLA Library on May 24, 2001.

2006: Collaborated organization with the Korean Government's Ministry of Culture and Tourism, and the Korean Culture & Content Agency.

== Facilities ==
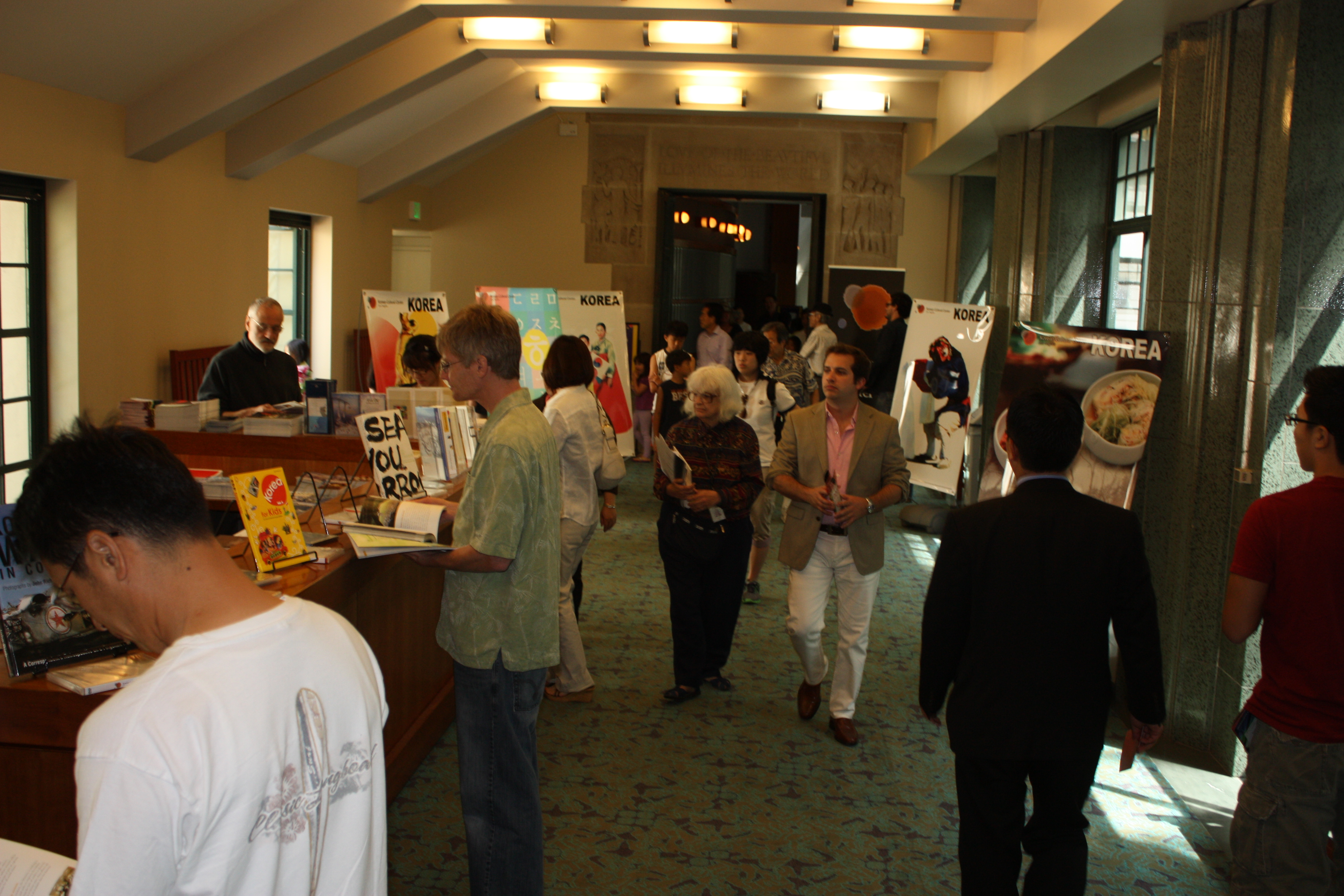
Book Concert

- Folk Museum – The museum features a permanent exhibition titled, "Emerging Country in East Asia - Elegant Life of the Noble Class during the Joseon Period." Visitors get a glimpse into the lives of Korean Confucian aristocracy through the traditional sarangbang (husband's quarter) and anbang (wife's quarter) rooms. A variety of traditional crafts, embroidery and relics are also on display.
- Art Gallery – The second floor features a gallery with several exhibits each year of local and internationally renowned artists in both traditional and contemporary art.
- Library – The library features more than 17,000 books, videotapes, DVDs, and CDs. Both in English and Korean.
- Auditorium – The Ari Hall is a venue for movies, lectures and presentations.
- The Exhibitions features historical pieces for display based on reference to Korea.

== See also ==
- Korean Art
- Culture of Korea
- Korean Wave
- Korean Cultural Centers
