= Korean Cultural Centers =

South Korean government organizations

Korean Cultural Center
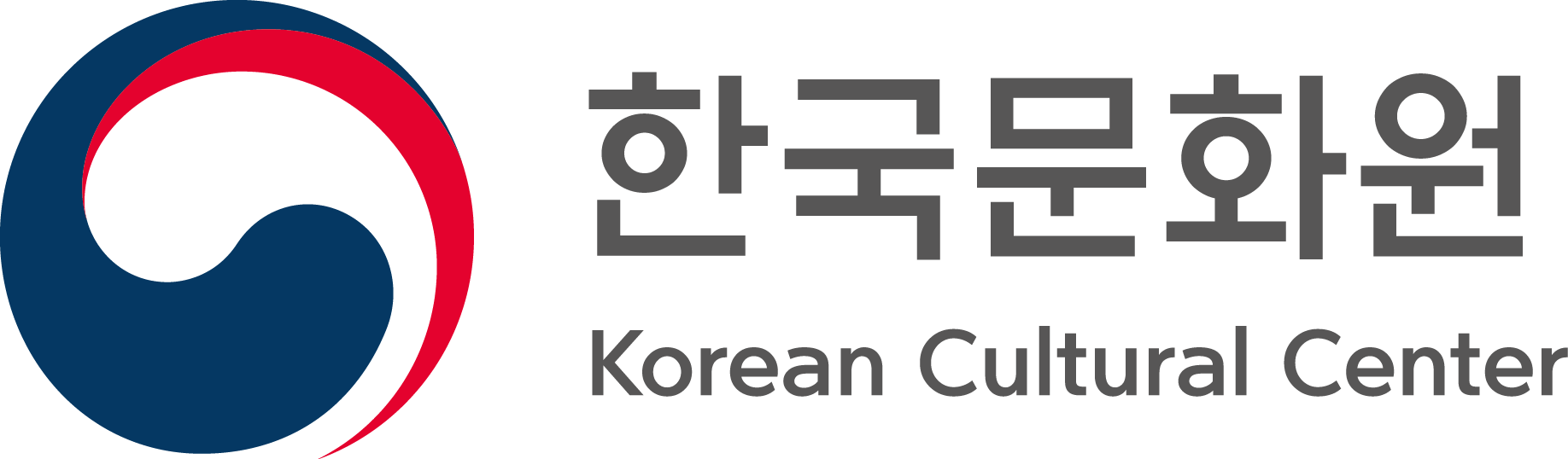
- Founded: 2009
- Founder: Korean Culture and Information Service
- Type: Cultural institution
- Purpose: Korean culture
- Region served: Worldwide

Korean Cultural Centers (Korean: 한국문화원; Hanja: 韓國文化院) are non-profit institutions aligned with the government of South Korea that aim to promote Korean culture and facilitate cultural exchanges.

== History ==
Starting from 2009, the Korean Culture and Information Service began setting up Korean Cultural Centers around the world.

== Overview ==
The centers are run by the Korean Culture and Information Service, a subdivision of South Korea's Ministry of Culture, Sports and Tourism.

=== Initiatives ===
As part of efforts to introduce and spread interest in diverse aspects of Korean culture, the centers have organized many programs under the categories of arts, music, literature, film and cuisine.

== List ==
Countries with at least one Korean Cultural Center South Korea

As of 2024, there are 37 Korean Cultural Centers in 30 countries.

=== Asia-Pacific ===
- Australia – Sydney
- China
  - Beijing
  - Shanghai
- Hong Kong
- India – New Delhi
- Indonesia – Jakarta
- Japan
  - Tokyo
  - Osaka
- Kazakhstan – Astana
- Philippines – Taguig
- Thailand – Bangkok
- Vietnam – Hanoi

=== Europe ===
- Austria – Vienna
- Belgium – Brussels
- France – Paris
- Germany – Berlin
- Hungary – Budapest
- Italy – Rome
- Poland – Warsaw
- Russia
  - Moscow
  - Ussuriysk
  - Sakhalin
- Spain – Madrid
- Sweden – Stockholm
- United Kingdom – London

=== Americas ===
- Argentina – Buenos Aires
- Brazil – São Paulo
- Canada – Ottawa
- Mexico – Mexico City
- United States
  - Washington D.C.
  - Los Angeles
  - New York City

=== Middle East and Africa ===
- Egypt – Cairo
- Nigeria – Abuja
- South Africa – Pretoria
- Turkey – Ankara
- United Arab Emirates – Abu Dhabi

== Gallery ==
Korean Cultural Centers

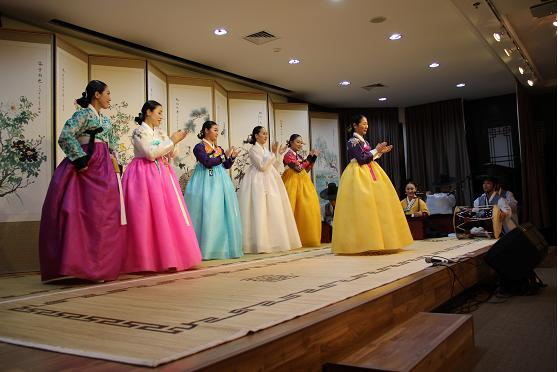
Korean Cultural Center in Indonesia

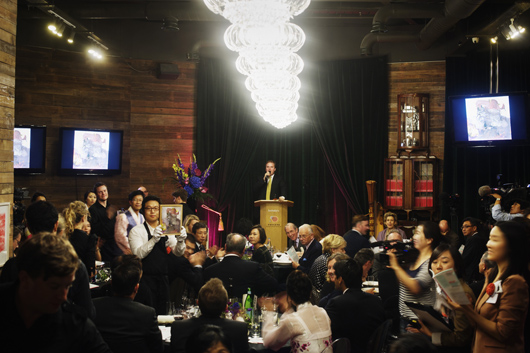
Korean Cultural Center in London

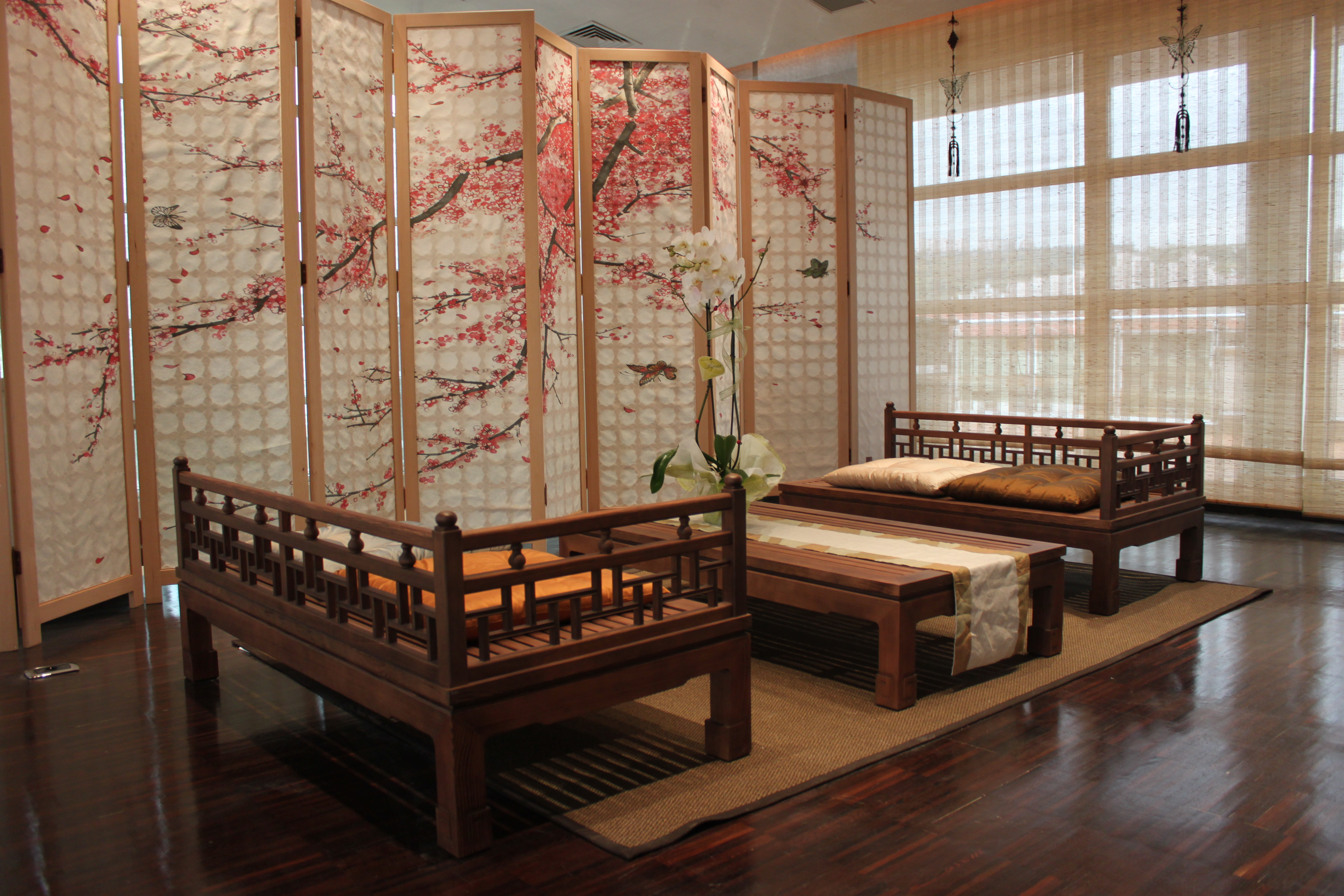
Korean Cultural Center in Turkey

== See also ==
- Culture of Korea
- Korean Wave
- Korea Foundation
- King Sejong Institute
