= Korean Culture and Information Service =

South Korean cultural promotion organization

- Founded: 1971; 55 years ago
- Founder: Government of South Korea
- Type: Cultural institution
- Purpose: Korean culture, Korean language
- Location: Government Complex-Sejong, 408, Galmae-ro, Sejong-si 30119, Republic of Korea
- Region served: 27 Countries
- Key people: Park Jung-Youl (Director)
- Website: www.kocis.go.kr/eng/main.do#

The Korean Culture and Information Service (KOCIS; Korean: 해외문화홍보원; Hanja: 海外文化弘報院) is an affiliated organization of the Ministry of Culture, Sports and Tourism of the South Korean government and runs 32 Korean cultural centers in 27 countries. The goal of the organization is to further enhance the image of Korea's national brand by promoting Korean heritage and arts through these cultural centers.

In its early years, as the Korean Overseas Information Service (KOIS), it also issued foreign-language propaganda reports about military affairs, such as on the Third Tunnel of Aggression.

It was announced in January 2024 that the service would shut down and become a part of the Ministry of Culture, Sports and Tourism.

== History ==
- December 1971 — Inaugurated as the Korean Overseas Information Service (KOIS) under the Ministry of Culture and Information.
- January 1990 - Affiliated with the Ministry of Information upon the division of the Ministry of Culture and Information into two separate ministries.
- February 1998 - Affiliated with the Ministry of Culture and Tourism upon the disbandment of the Ministry of Information, and its name changed to the Korean Overseas Culture and Information Service (KOCIS).
- May 1999 - Affiliated with the newly launched Government Information Agency, and its name reverted to Korean Overseas Information Service(KOCIS)
- February 2008 - Affiliated with the Ministry of Culture, Sports and Tourism (MCST) in accordance with a revision to the Government Organization Act, and its name changed to the Korean Culture and Information Service (KOCIS).
- February 2012 - Transferred responsibilities for the missions and tasks entrusted with the Korean Cultural Centers and Culture and Information Officers to the International Cultural Affairs Division of the MCST
- September 2013 - Reassumed responsibilities for supporting and evaluating the Korean Cultural Centers and Culture and Information Officers as well as for specific executions of the Centers' programs from the International Cultural Affairs Division of the MCST
- January 2015 - Reassumed the full remaining responsibilities for the work of the Korean Cultural Centers and Culture and Information Officers form the International Cultural Affairs Division of the MCST

== Initiatives ==
=== Web portal ===
KOCIS manages KOREA.net, the official web portal of the South Korean government.
