= Parish of the Holy Child of Peace =

- Parroquia del Santo Niño de la Paz
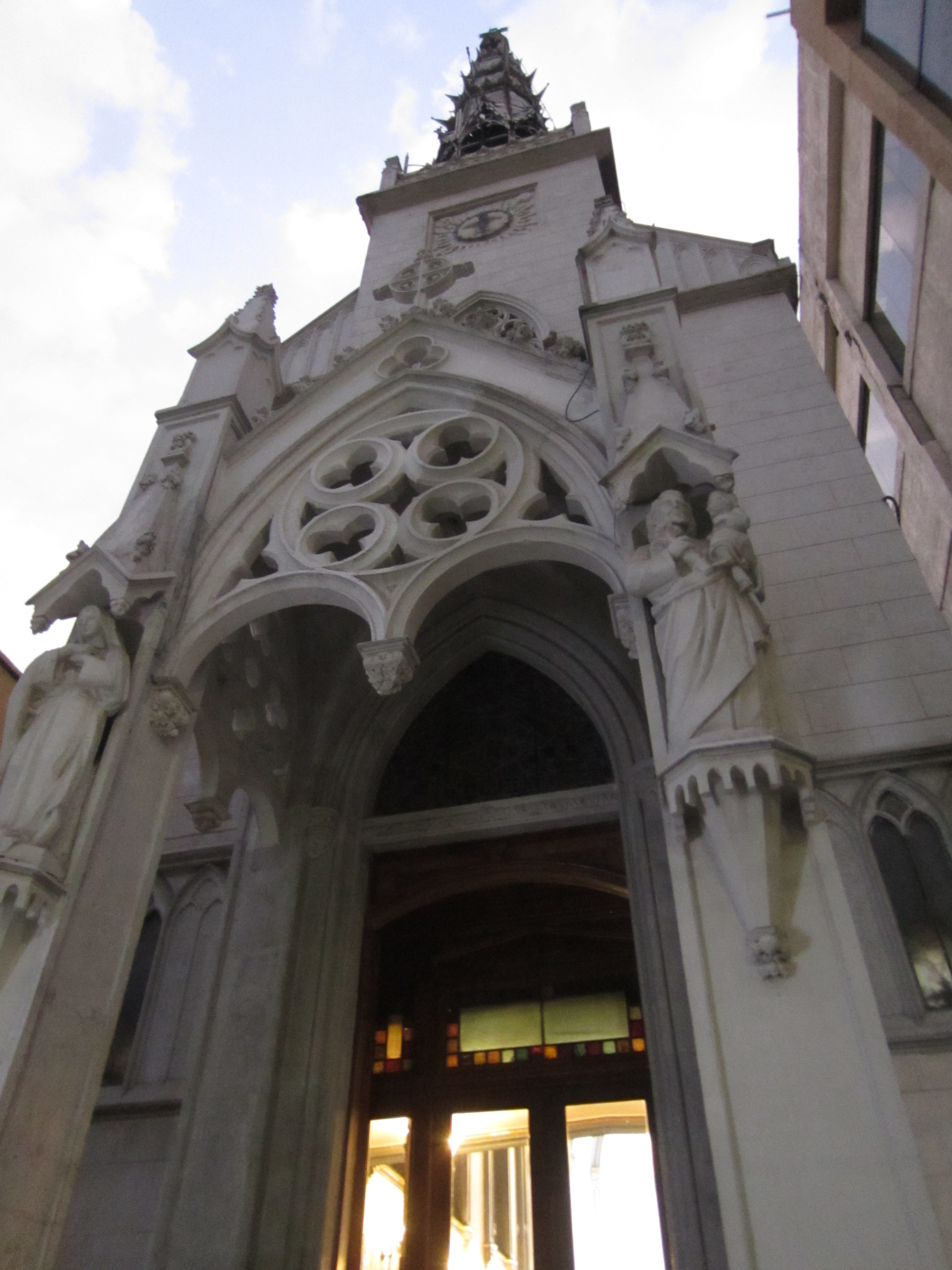
- The church's exterior, 2018
- Parish of the Holy Child of Peace
- 19°25′29.5″N 99°10′12″W
- Location: Praga 11, Cuauhtémoc, Mexico City
- Country: Mexico

The Parish of the Holy Child of Peace (Spanish: Parroquia del Santo Niño de la Paz) is a historic church located near Paseo de la Reforma and Zona Rosa in Cuauhtémoc, Mexico City, Mexico. It is also known as Praga Parish (Spanish: Parroquia de Praga) because it is found on Praga 11 Street. The church is known for its German neogothic architecture and was recognized as a temple by the Secretariat of the Interior in 1931.
