= Avenida República de Corea =

Avenue in Mérida, Yucatán, Mexico

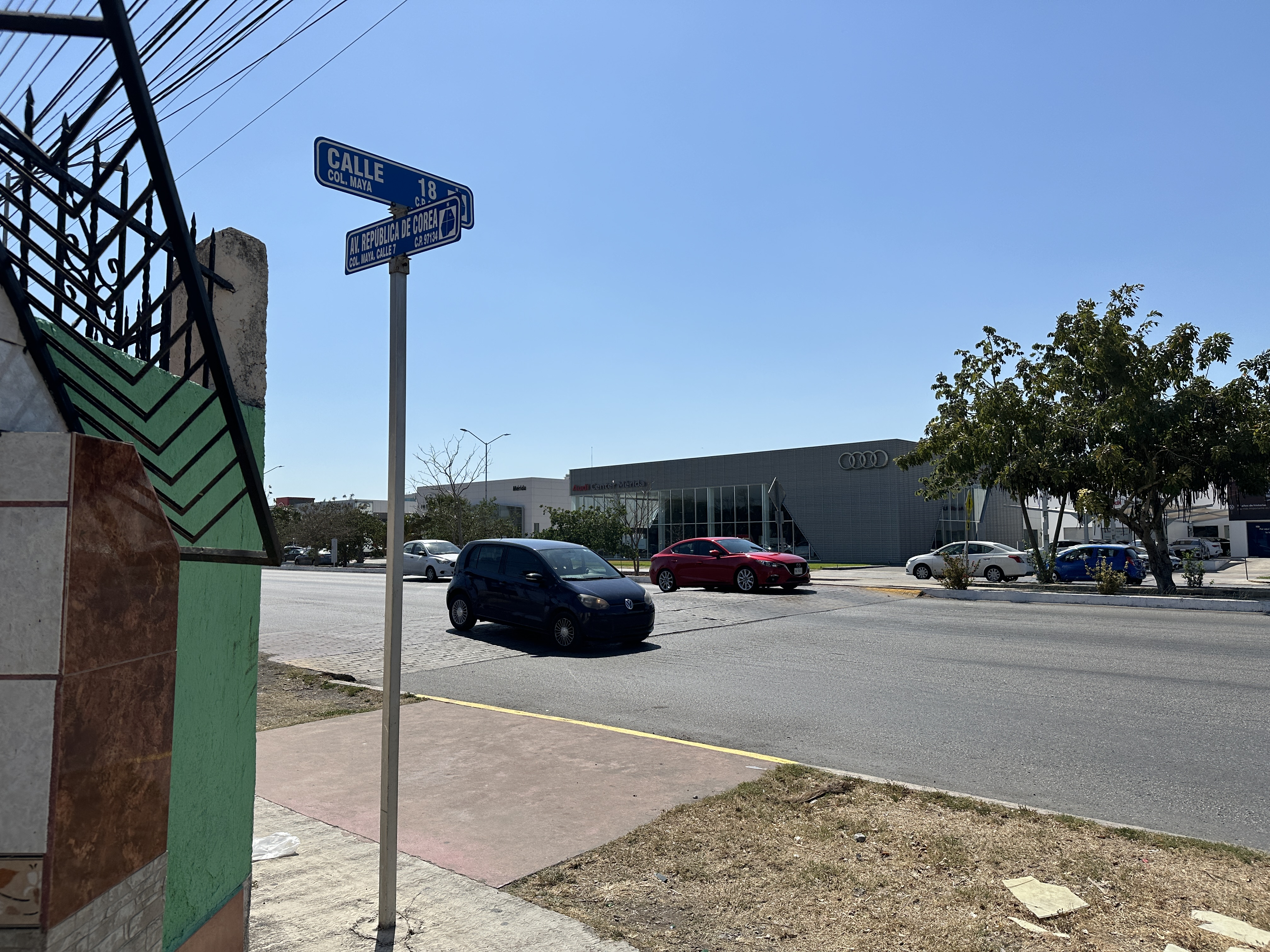
Part of the road, with road sign visible (2024)

Avenida República de Corea (lit. 'Republic of Korea Avenue'; Korean: 대한민국로) is a major avenue in Mérida, Yucatán, Mexico. It was previously named Avenida 7 (lit. 'Avenue 7'), but was renamed in honor of South Korea in 2017. The local government unanimously approved the new name for the avenue on 19 August of that year. This followed South Korean investments in road infrastructure in the city. As thanks for the gesture, South Korea offered to install a monument in the future highlighting the friendship between the two countries. The monument was unveiled on 17 March 2021; it is one in a series of statues called Greetingman, which depict a six-meter-tall humanoid figure bowing respectfully.

== See also ==
- Korea–Mexico Friendship Hospital – A hospital in Mérida built with South Korean funding
