= Chun Beeho =

South Korean diplomat

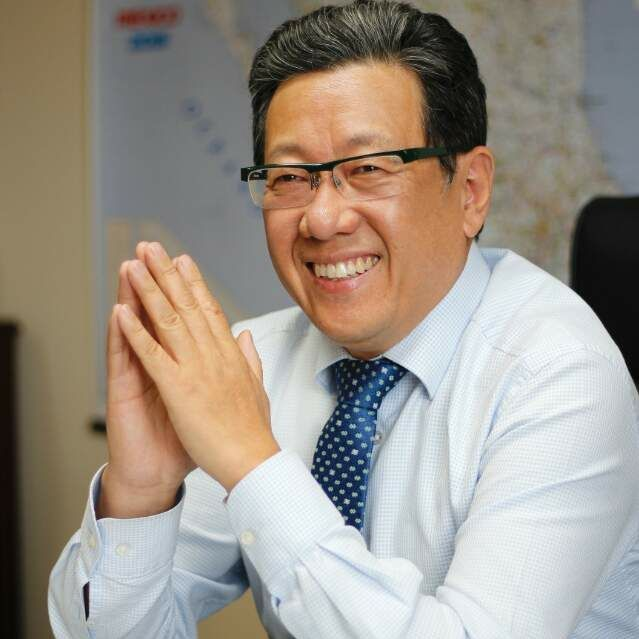
Ex-Ambassador Chun Beeho

Chun Beeho (Korean: 전비호; born 1957) is a South Korean diplomat, professor and global business consultant. He served as ROK's plenipotentiary ambassador to Mexico from May, 2015 to December, 2017 as well as plenipotentiary ambassador to Bulgaria from 2010 to 2013. He has been a distinguished/visiting professor of Sungkyunkwan University in Seoul in the Republic of Korea since March 2018, giving a lecture on global supply chain crisis and global business strategy.

Currently, he is serving as the vice president of the Korean Council on Foreign Relations, of which members are incumbent and retired diplomats and ambassadors.

He is the CEO of MnM Institute Limited, giving business consulting. He is an administrative attorney and an External Director of JW Pharmaceutical Co. and President of Organizing Committee and Chair of international cooperation of International Robot Olympiad (IRO).

== Education ==
Dr. Chun Beeho holds a bachelor's degree in political science at the Sungkyunkwan University in Seoul, a master's degree in European Community studies from the Polytechnic University of Madrid (Universidad Politecnica de Madrid) in Spain, and a PhD. in Political Sciences and Sociology of the Complutense University of Madrid (Universidad Complutense de Madrid), Spain. His master's thesis included an Analysis on Trade between the European Community and Newly industrialized Developing Countries in Asia (Polytechnic University of Madrid, Spain, 1990), and his Doctoral Thesis was related to an Analysis on the integration of the European Union and its Political and Economic implications to Asia (Complutense University of Madrid, Spain 2001). He holds a degree of doctor honorary causa in philology science from Sofia University of Bulgaria and a degree of doctor honorary causa from Bulgaria Science Academy. Currently, he is a distinguished professor of College of Engineering of Sungkyunkwan University in Seoul. He served as the Director of International Cooperation Development Center of the University.

== Professional career ==
Chun's diplomatic career began in 1980 joining the Ministry of Foreign Affairs of the Republic of Korea after having passed the Diplomatic Service Examination in the same year. Following the Ambassador Extraordinary and Plenipotentiary to Bulgaria and Mexico, since 2018 he served as Distinguished Professor of Sungkyunkwan University in Seoul.

Since 2015, he represented the Diplomatic Mission of the Republic of Korea in the United States of Mexico. Presenting on June 19, 2015 Credentials to the President of the United Mexican States, Enrique Peña Nieto.

Referring to his diplomatic legacy in Mexico he served for the promotion of an FTA between the Republic of Korea and Mexico; the promotion of Foreign Direct Investments of Korean Companies in Mexico headed by Kia, Hyundai Motors and Promotion of National Content in Mexican Exports; the Creation of Academic Industrial Cooperation Centers (ICC) for the technology transfer between State of Mexico, Mexico and the Republic of Korea; Academic, scientific, technological and cultural cooperation between the Republic of Korea and Universities in Mexico; Promotion of the First Direct Flight between South Korea and Mexico, operated by Aeromexico; The naming of Avenue Republic of Korea by the Major of Mérida, Yucatán.

As a South Korean diplomat, he served as visiting lectureres in Bulgaria, Costa Rica, Cuba, France, Indonesia, Mexico, South Korea, Spain and Thailand. He has participated as Academic Lecturer in prestigious universities as Mines Paris ("South Korea: France's Strategic Partner in Asia", 2004), the Monterrey Institute of Technology and Higher Education Campus Monterrey ("Free Trade Strategy between South Korea and Mexico", 2017), Colmex in Mexico City ("The Foreign Trade Policy of Korea and the Impetus for Free Trade between Korea and Mexico", 2017), the Sungkyunkwan University in Seoul ("Analysis on the Korea's FTA strategy towards Asia", 2007; "Economic Integration in the East Asia Region", 2008), and the University of Sofia in Bulgaria ("Government Policy Review of the Republic of Korea", 2010; "South Korea as Crossroads of Asia", 2012).

== Academic articles, dissertations and books ==
- Analysis on the trade between the European Community and Newly industrialized developing countries in Asia (Master's Thesis, Polytechnic University of Madrid, España 1990).
- The Single Market of the European Community and Developing Countries (Dissertation, 1991).
- Analysis on the integration of the European Union and its political and economic relations with Asia (PHD Degree Thesis, Complutense University of Madrid, España 2001).
- Innovation & The Academy: The Case of South Korea.
- A Bulgarian View of the Republic of Korea.
- Information Book on the shipbuilding negotiations between the European Union and the Republic of Korea (2000).
- Analysis on the external relations of the European Community (Contemporary international politics by Dr. Yoon Keon-shik, 1991).
- The Small and Medium enterprise policy of the European Community (1992, KITA).
- The integration of the European Community and the trade policy recommendation to the Korean Government (1992, KITA).
- The facts of the Korea-US Free Trade Agreement: meaning and expected effect (March 2006).
- The status and strategy of Korea's FTA policy toward Asia (East Asia Brief by the Sungkwonkwan University, 2007).
- The way to train global sports leaders for strengthening Sports Diplomacy (2008).
- "Evolution of Bilateral Relations between the Republic of Korea and the Republic of Bulgaria" (Conference paper collection of "Korea as Crossroads of Asia", national conference on Korean studies, University of Sofia, 2012).
- Let's prepare for Yeosu EXPO assessment (Maritime Economic Newspaper, March 17, 2007).
- Reasons to turn eyes to the East of Balkan region (Hankyung newspaper, February 2010).
- Bulgaria waiting for Korea (Munhwa Daily, December 2010).
- Bulgaria as new ground for Green industry (Hankooki daily, February 2011).
- Han wave on the Balkans (Munhwa Daily, September 2011).
- Korea-Bulgaria Policy Forum 2012 (Editor, Embassy of the Republic of Korea, Sofia University, May 30, 2012)
- Mexico, FTA Hub where Foreign Direct Investments are rushing (Hankyung, January 16, 2016)

== Awards ==
- Service Merit Medal, Republic of Korea (December 2007)
- Order of Stara Planina 1st Class, Bulgaria (May 2013)
- Red Stripes Order of Service Merit, Republic of Korea (June 2018)
- Order of Aguila Azteca, Mexico (September 2018)
- Doctor honoris causa from the University of Sofia

== See also ==
- List of diplomatic missions of South Korea
- Politics of South Korea
- Korean immigration to Mexico
- Culture of South Korea
