= Museo Conmemorativo de la Inmigración Coreana a Yucatán =

Museum in Mérida, Yucatán, Mexico

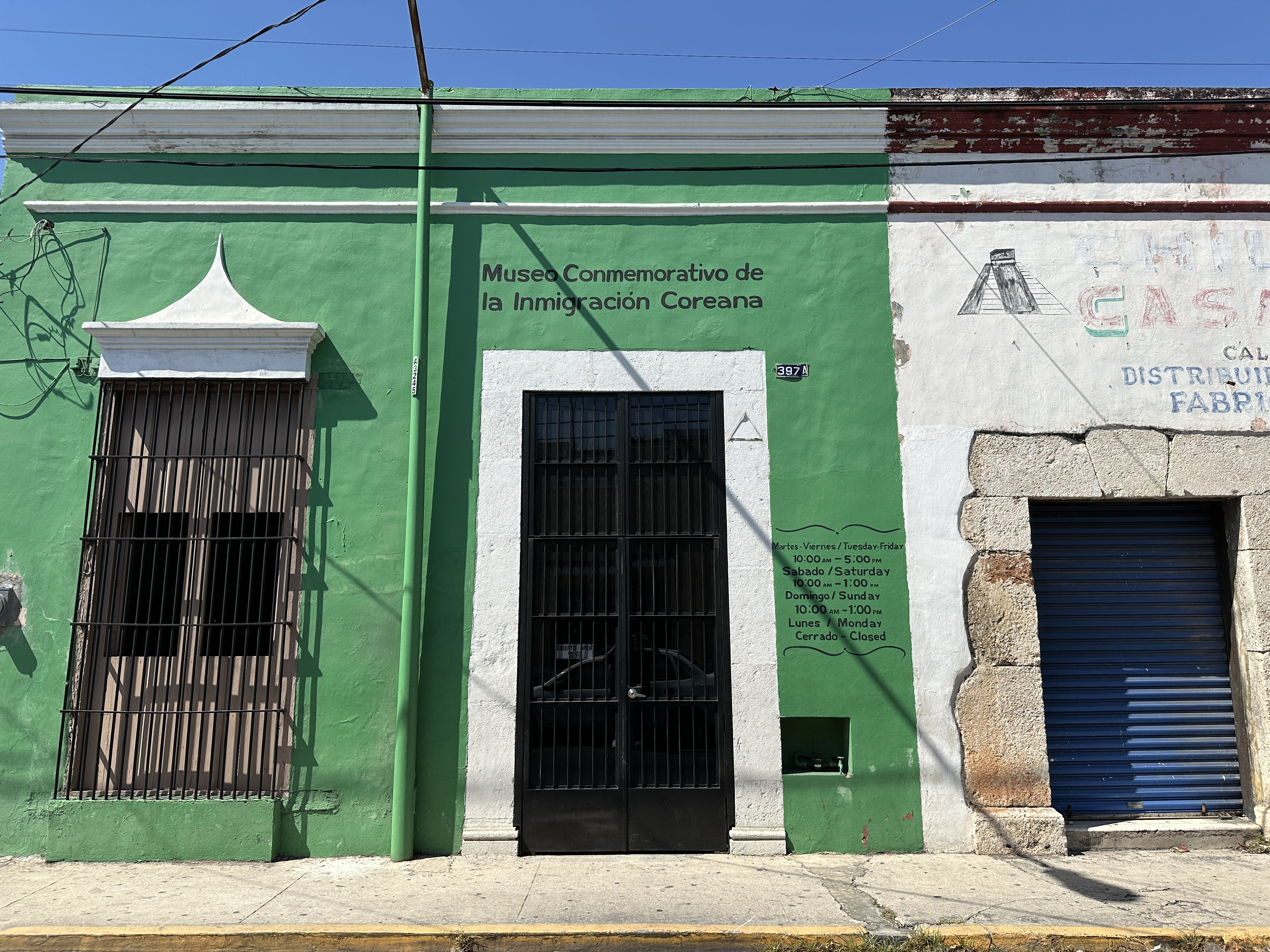
- The museum (2024)
- Established: February 26, 2005
- Location: Mérida, Yucatán, Mexico
- Coordinates: 20.9632°N 89.6136°W
- Director: Dolores García Escalante

The Museo Conmemorativo de la Inmigración Coreana a Yucatán (lit. 'Museum Commemorating the Immigration of Koreans to Yucatán'; Korean: 한국 이민사 박물관) is a museum in Mérida, Yucatán, Mexico. It was established on either February 26, 2005 or May 15, 2007, and focuses on the history and culture of Koreans in Mexico, particularly in Mérida. As of 2022, the director of the museum was Dolores García Escalante.

The museum was established as part of celebrations of the 100th anniversary of Koreans arriving in Mexico. It was established with the joint effort and funding of the Mexican and South Korean governments. The building used to house the headquarters of the Yucatán branch of the Korean National Association, from around 1930 to 1960.

The museum covers the Korean Mexicans' role in the Korean independence movement during the Japanese colonial period. The names of many of the original migrants are written on plaques in the museum. It houses many historic artifacts from the local community, including photographs, documents, and objects. Elements of Korean culture, including clothing (hanbok) and a historic warship replica (turtle ship) are displayed in the museum. Exhibits identify similarities between Mexican and Korean history and culture, as well as the harsh realities of the difficult labor the early Korean laborers were subjected to in Mexico. They also highlight the diversity that developed in the community, with children speaking more Mayan than they could Korean.

== See also ==
- Korean migration to Mexico centennial monument – A memorial tower, also in Mérida and also created in 2005
- Pequeño Seúl – The Koreatown in Mexico City
- Koreans in Cuba – Descendents of the Mexican population of Koreans
- Korea–Mexico Friendship Hospital – A hospital, also in Mérida and also created in 2005
