= Mexico–North Korea relations =

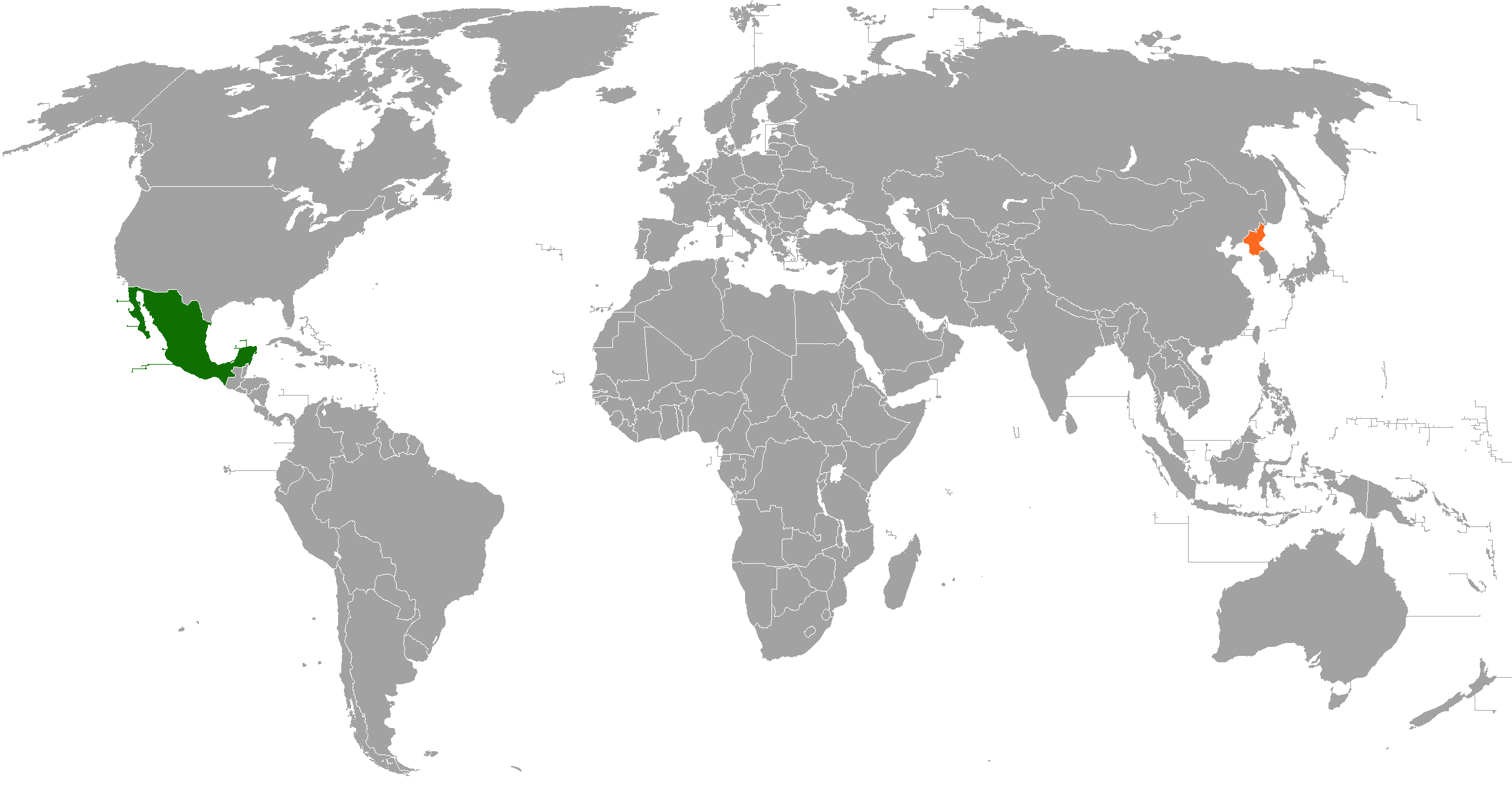

- Mexico: North Korea

The nations of Mexico and the Democratic People's Republic of Korea (North Korea) established diplomatic relations in 1980. Both nations are members of the United Nations.

== History ==
Mexico and North Korea established diplomatic relations on 4 September 1980; 27 years after the end of the Korean War. In 1993, North Korea opened an embassy in Mexico City. Initial diplomatic relations between both nations were cordial. North Korea has collaborated in projects throughout Mexico, particularly in the Mexican states of Durango, Nayarit, Oaxaca, Puebla, San Luis Potosí and the State of Mexico.

In 2003, relations between both nations hit a low when North Korea withdrew from the Treaty on the Non-Proliferation of Nuclear Weapons. Since then, Mexico has repeatedly condemned all missile launches from North Korea. In June 2009, as a non-permanent member of the United Nations Security Council, Mexico voted in favor of Security Council Resolution 1874 which imposed further economic and commercial sanctions on North Korea and encouraged UN member states to search North Korean cargo ships. In July 2014, a North Korean merchant ship called the Mu Du Bong ran aground and damaged nearly an acre of coral reefs near the Mexican state of Veracruz. Mexico detained the ship after discovering that it belongs to a blacklisted shipping firm. The merchant ship was never released back to North Korea and in 2016 Mexico began scrapping the ship and released the crew members back to their home country.

Throughout 2017, Mexico has condemned all missile launches from North Korea. On 7 September 2017, the Mexican Ministry of Foreign Affairs declared persona non grata the Ambassador of North Korea in Mexico, Kim Hyong-gil, and expelled him from the country within 72 hours. This decision followed the sixth nuclear test carried out by Pyongyang.

On 12 June 2018, through a statement from the Mexican Ministry of Foreign Affairs, the Mexican government considered the meeting held between the President of the United States, Donald Trump and the North Korean Leader, Kim Jong-un to be of great importance for peace between the two nations. In December of that same year, Kim Yong-nam, President of the Presidium of the Supreme People's Assembly of North Korea arrived in Mexico City to attend the inauguration of President Andrés Manuel López Obrador.

In September 2020, President Obrador accepted the credentials of the new resident North Korean Ambassador, Sun-Ryong Song, to Mexico.

== Bilateral Agreements ==
Both nations have signed a few bilateral agreements such as an Agreement on Education and Cultural Cooperation (2008) and an Agreement of Cooperation in Public Health and Traditional Medicine (2009).

== Trade ==
In 2023, total trade between both nations amounted to US$459,000. Mexico's exports to North Korea include: essential oils used for soaps, perfumes and waxing; inorganic luminophore, splints and fracture appliances. North Korea's exports to Mexico include: acrylic polymers, glass, plastic, photographic and cinematographic equipment, insecticides and pasta.

In 2015, Mexico was North Korea's most important trading partner in Latin America with purchasing 1% of North Korea's total exports.

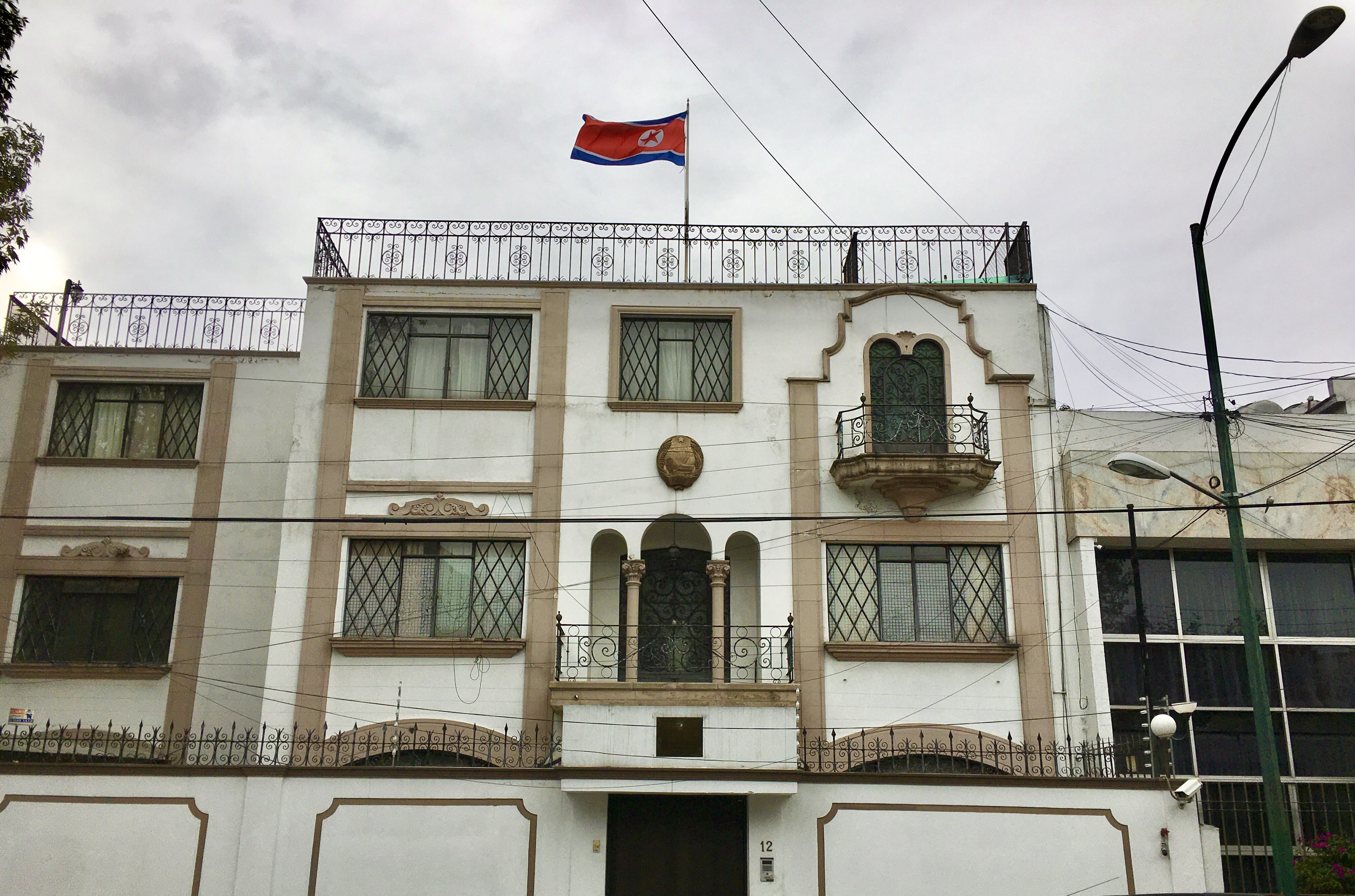
The Embassy of North Korea in Mexico City

== Diplomatic missions ==
- Mexico is accredited to North Korea from its embassy in Seoul, South Korea.
- North Korea has an embassy in Mexico City.

== See also ==
- Koreans in Mexico
- List of North Korean ambassadors to Mexico

| Diplomatic agrément/ Diplomatic accreditation | Ambassador | Observations | Leader of North Korea | Head of state of Mexico | Term end |
|---|---|---|---|---|---|
| September 4, 1980 | | *The governments in Pyongyang and Mexico City established diplomatic relations. | Kim Il Sung | José López Portillo | |
| February 1, 1983 | Pak Yong-se | Pak Yong-se, 28 New DPRK Ambassador to Mexico Pak Yongse presents his credentials to President Miguel de la Madrid Hurtado. | Kim Il Sung | Miguel de la Madrid Hurtado | |
| March 1, 1988 | Pak Jung-guk | (†October 1, 1996) since Oct. 28, 1987 residence in Havana, concurrently Ambassador to Mexico and Venezuela. | Kim Il Sung | Carlos Salinas de Gortari | |
| September 20, 1993 | Kim Sung-ryong | North Korean Ambassador to Mexico Kim Sung-ryong told an in interview with the Mexican press on September 22 that the North Korean embassy in Mexico opened on September 20, 1993. | Kim Jong Il | Carlos Salinas de Gortari | |
| February 16, 1998 | Kim Chang-shik | North Korean Ambassador to Mexico Kim Chang-shik was deported February 13 by the Mexican government in connection with recent cocaine smuggling involving two North Korean diplomats residing in Mexico. | Kim Jong Il | Ernesto Zedillo Ponce de León | |
| January 1, 2003 | Ri Kang-se | | Kim Jong Il | Vicente Fox Quesada | |
| February 14, 2005 | So Jae-myong | Feb. 14 The Korean Central News Agency says that the Presidium of the Supreme People's Assembly appoints him as ambassador to Mexico, replacing Ri Kang-se. | Kim Jong Il | Vicente Fox Quesada | |
| December 5, 2011 | Kun Song-an | DPRK Ambassador to Mexico An Kun Song (An Ku'n-so'ng) greets Mexico's new president Enrique Peña Nieto. | Kim Jong Un | Felipe Calderón | |
| June 21, 2016 | Kim Hyong-gil | | Kim Jong Un | Enrique Peña Nieto | September 8, 2017 |
| September 29, 2020 | Sun-Ryong Song | | Kim Jong Un | Andrés Manuel López Obrador | Current |
