= Pesquería =

Coordinates: 25°47′06″N 100°03′04″W

- Municipality
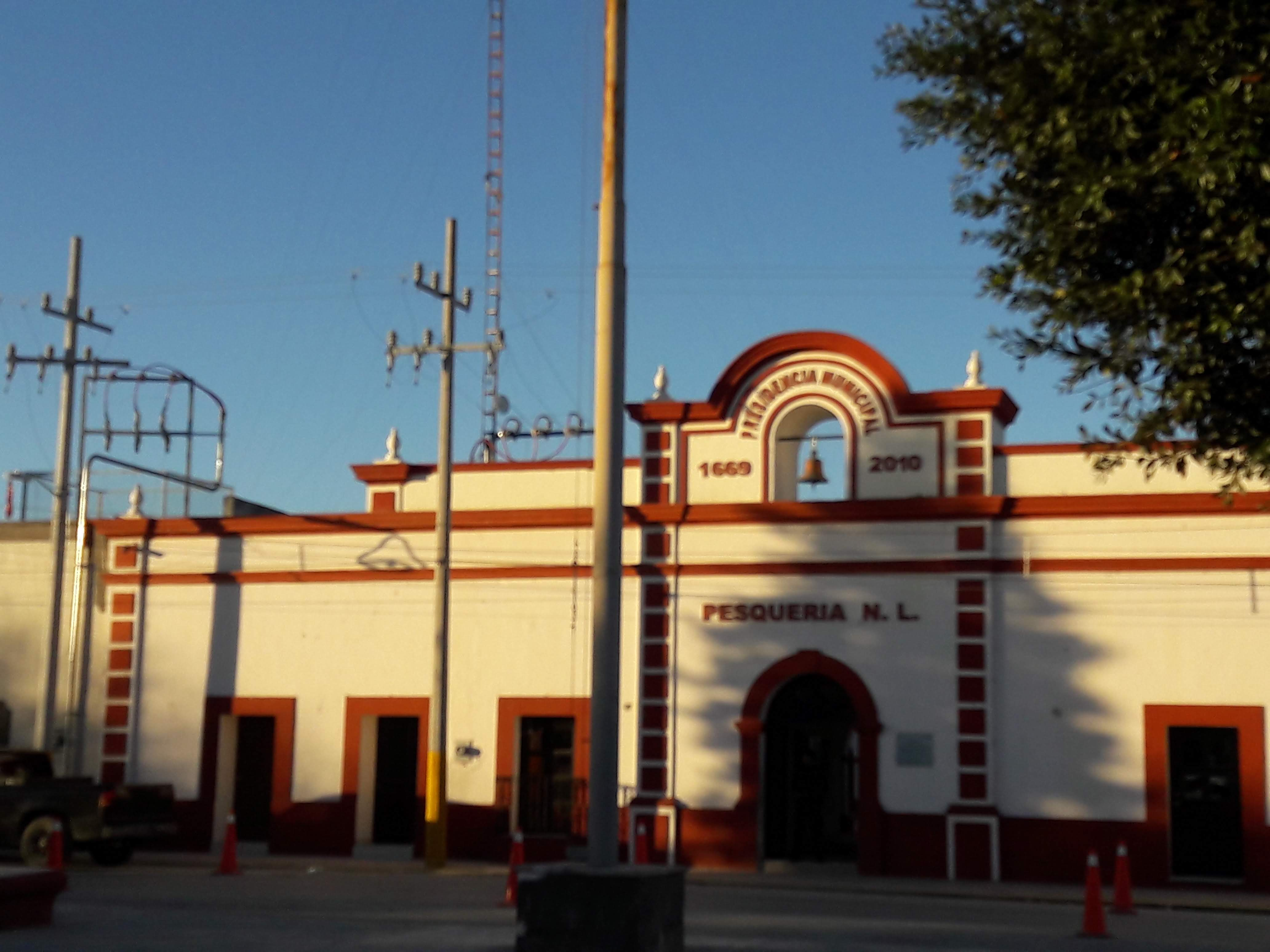
- Town hall

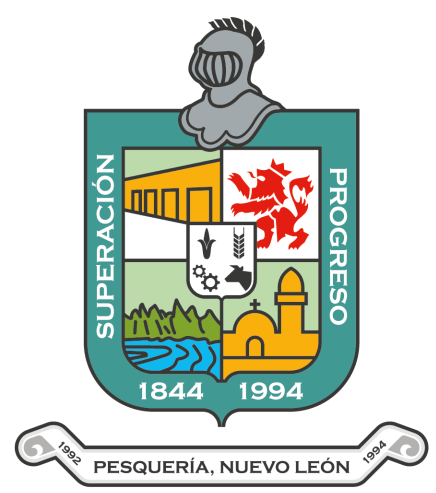
- Coat of arms
- Interactive map of Pesquería
- Country: Mexico
- State: Nuevo León

Government
  - Federal electoral district: Nuevo León's 14th

Area
  - Total: 322.8 km^{2} (124.6 sq mi)

Population (2020 census)
  - Total: 147,624
  - Density: 457.3/km^{2} (1,184/sq mi)
- Time zone: UTC-6 (Zona Centro)

Pesquería is a municipality of the state of Nuevo León in Mexico. It is located at 25º47´N 100º3´W and 330 metres (1,080 ft) above sea level. It is part of the suburban area of the Monterrey Metropolitan area. Its distance to the Monterrey city downtown area is 36 kilometres (22 mi). To the east of Pesquería is Los Ramones, to the north is Doctor González, to the west are Apodaca and Monterrey International Airport, and to the south is Cadereyta Jiménez, all of which are in Nuevo León.

The river Pesquería flows through the region.

== Demographics ==
The creation of a new automotive plant by KIA has led to an influx of South Korean immigrants and workers to the area. Colloquially, Pesquería has even been referred to as "Pescorea", a portmanteau of "Pesquería" and "Corea", the Spanish word for Korea.

== Localities ==
Name	Population (2020)	Area
Pesquería	48,069	6.27 km^{2}
Valle de Santa María	40,703	3.33 km^{2}
Colinas del Aeropuerto	33,108	2.48 km^{2}
Ladrillera (Entronque Pesqueria)	10,178	2.17 km^{2}
Las Haciendas	5,692	0.35 km^{2}
Paseo de San Javier	2,178	0.15 km^{2}
Los Olmos	1,292	0.09 km^{2}

== Economy ==
The most important economic activities in the municipality of Pesqueria are cattle-breeding (about 20,000 hectares) and agriculture (about 10,000 hectares).

Suitable clay deposits enabled founding of some works producing bricks and tiles of good quality for local consumption as well as for export.

An automotive plant was built by the Korean KIA Motors company in 2016 for a planned production of 300,000 cars annually.

== See also ==
- Pequeño Seúl
