= Pescorea =

Ethnic group in Pesquería, Mexico

Pescorea is the name given to the immigrant community from the Korean Peninsula settled in the city of Pesquería, in the Mexican state of Nuevo León. The term is therefore a portmanteau for the name of this town and the peninsula. These Korean immigrants generally come from South Korea.

Thousands of Korean immigrants who arrived in Mexico have established everything from homes to businesses in Pesquería and other cities in Nuevo León, giving rise to a greater influence of the "Pescorea" phenomenon, as well as a cultural exchange between both countries. As of 2020, the population of the municipality is 147,624 inhabitants, which represents a growth of 608% compared to 2010.

== History ==
Pesquería is a town located in the central part of the state of Nuevo León, at 25°47′ north latitude and 100°3′ west longitude, at an average altitude of 330 meters above sea level. It borders the so-called Monterrey metropolitan area. The town has been attracted to South Korean immigrants largely by major international companies from that country and the quality of life it offers.

In 2014, the South Korean multinational Kia Motors, along with the Japanese company Toyota, were in negotiations with the then governor of Nuevo León, Rodrigo Medina, to boost the automotive industry in the state. However, unlike Toyota, due to a lack of agreements, Kia Motors opened its plant in July 2015. Another major South Korean automaker established there is Hyundai Motor Company.

According to the Secretariat of Economy, Pesquería was the municipality that attracted the most foreign direct investment, even more than Mexico City, between 2018 and 2020.

=== Culture ===
Mu Kung Hwa (무궁화) Korean restaurant, located on the road to Santa Maria, is a frequent spot for local residents and Korean immigrants.

== See also ==
- Koreans in Mexico
