= Greetingman =

Series of sculptures by Yoo Young-ho

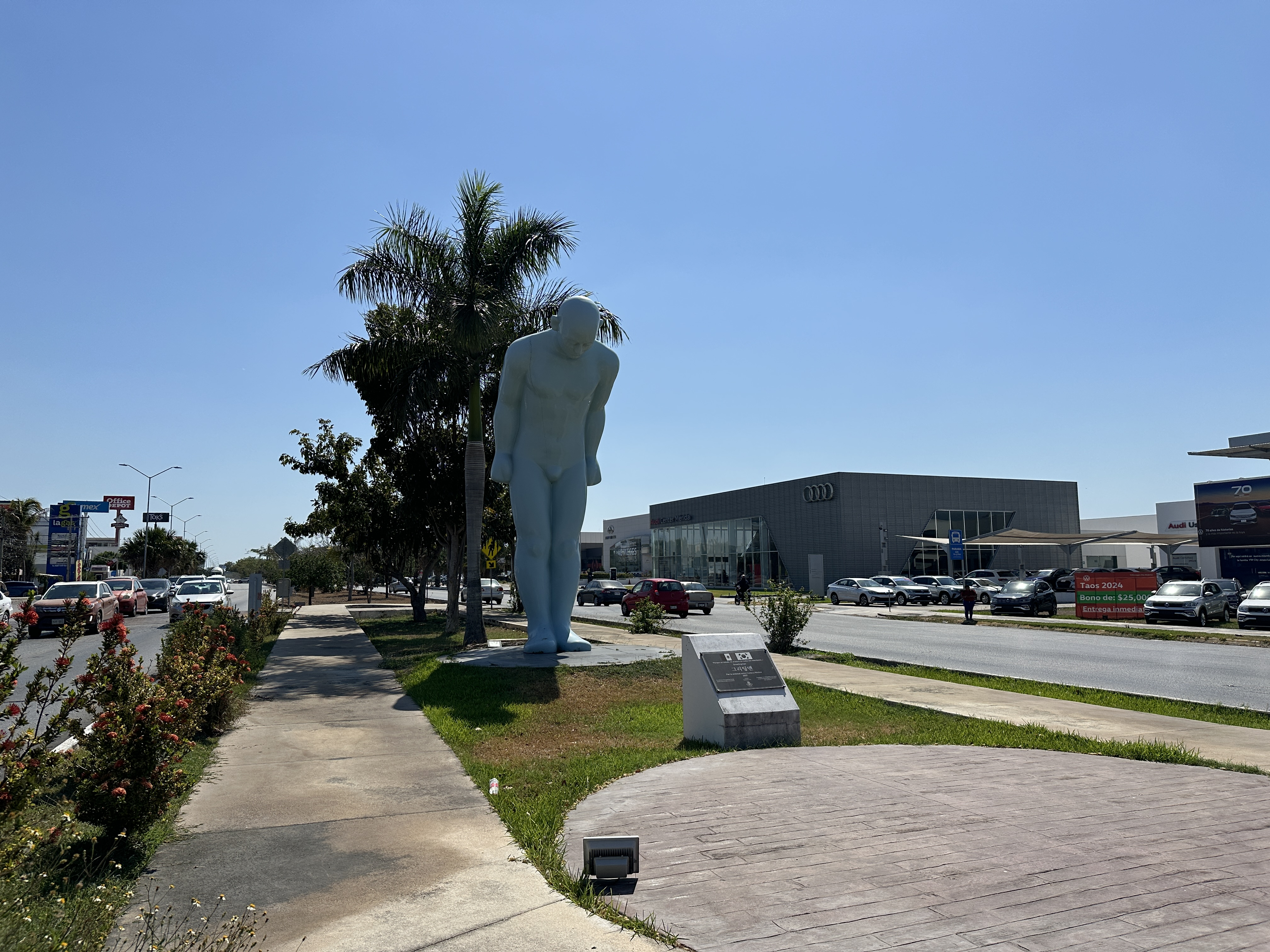
The statue in Mérida, Yucatán, Mexico (2024)

Greetingman (Korean: 그리팅맨) is a South Korean modern sculpture project. Its main artist is sculptor Yoo Young-ho. The concept provides a man, 6 meters high, bowing in a typically Asian greeting gesture. The blue color symbolizes a lack of prejudice.

A series of these statues were intended to be installed, to symbolize South Korea's friendship with various countries around the world. In October 2012, the first such statue was unveiled in the neighbourhood of Buceo, Montevideo, Uruguay. South Korea is the antipode (opposite side of the earth) of Uruguay, which adds symbolic meaning to the statue. The second statue was unveiled in October 2013 in South Korea, near the Korean Demilitarized Zone, in Haean, Yanggu County, Gangwon. A third statue was unveiled in January 2016 in Panama City, Panama, the second to be unveiled in Latin America. Another statue was built in Merida, Yucatan, Mexico on March 17, 2021. It commemorates the large Korean community that was started by the first wave in 1905 of henequen laborers.

== See also ==
- Korean sculpture
- Public art in South Korea
- Koreans in Mexico
- Mexico–South Korea relations
- Korean migration to Mexico centennial monument
