= Korean migration to Mexico centennial monument =

Memorial in Mérida, Yucatán, Mexico

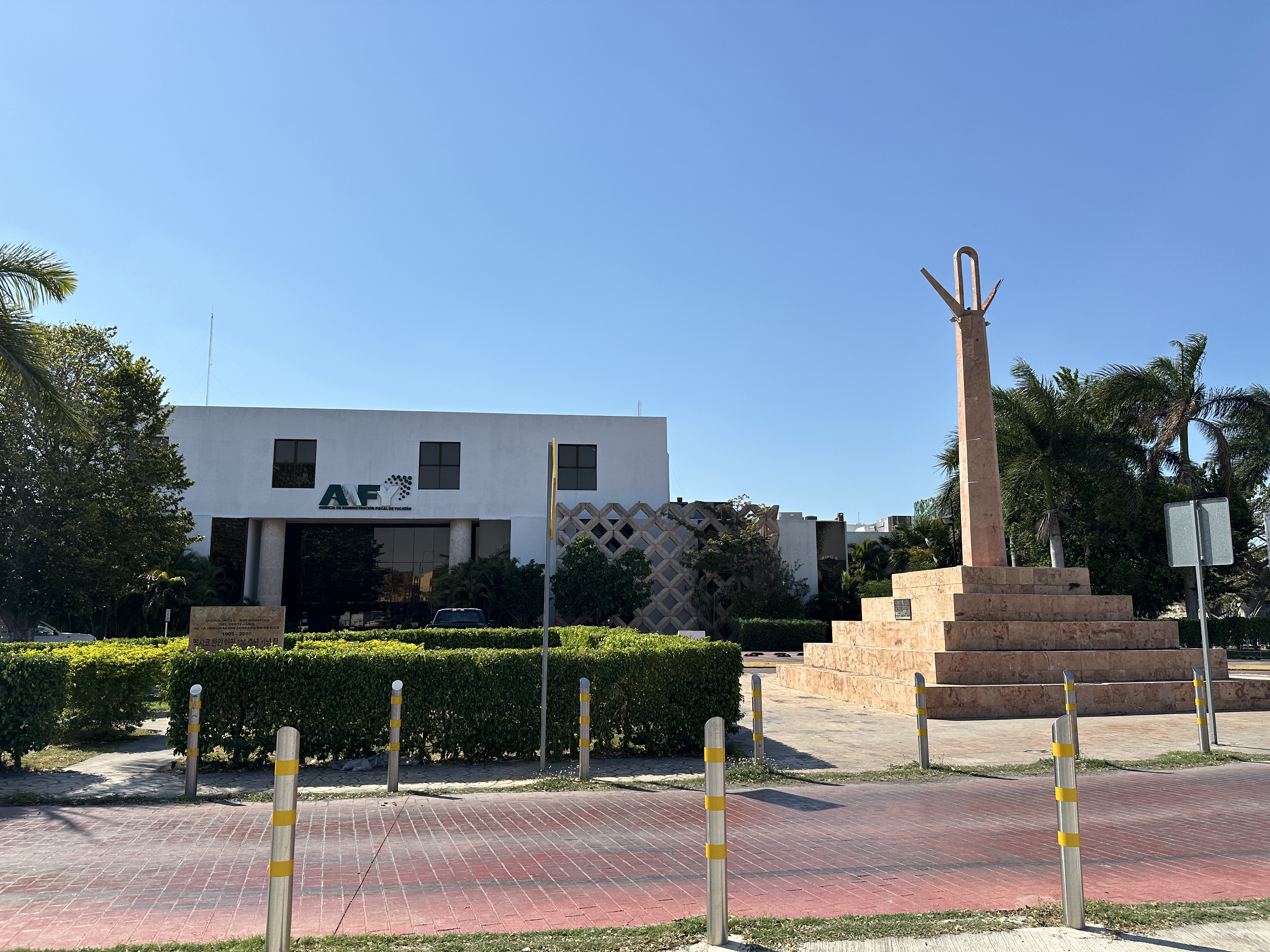
- The monument (right) and corresponding plaque (left) (2024)
- 21.0326°N 89.6278°W
- Location: Mérida, Yucatán, Mexico
- Inauguration date: 2005

There is a monument (Spanish: Monumento conmemorativo del Centenario de la Inmigración Coreana en México, lit. 'Monument Commemorating the Centennial of Korean Immigration to Mexico') in Mérida, Yucatán, Mexico that commemorates the 100th anniversary of Korean laborers arriving in Mexico. It consists of a small tower and plaque.

Korean laborers first arrived as contract laborers in Mexico in 1905. They arrived in the Port of Progreso, and settled in various farms and plantations in the area. However, their labor was exploited, and they never earned enough to return to Korea as they had once intended. This gave rise to a population of Koreans in Mexico.

In the 2000s, the South Korean government emphasized its link with its diaspora in Mexico to better ties with its Mexican counterpart. On the 100th anniversary of the first arrival, the two governments coordinated on various memorial events to mark the occasion. This monument was produced as part of those efforts. It is located in a fairly busy part of the city, and is prominently visible. The monument has been restored to a somewhat different appearance since its original construction.

== See also ==
- Greetingman – One copy of this South Korean statue is also in Mérida
- Museo Conmemorativo de la Inmigracion Coreana a Yucatan – History museum covering Koreans in Mexico established in Mérida in 2005
- Korea–Mexico Friendship Hospital – Hospital established in Mérida in 2005
