= Statue of Tin Tan =

Statue in Mexico City, Mexico

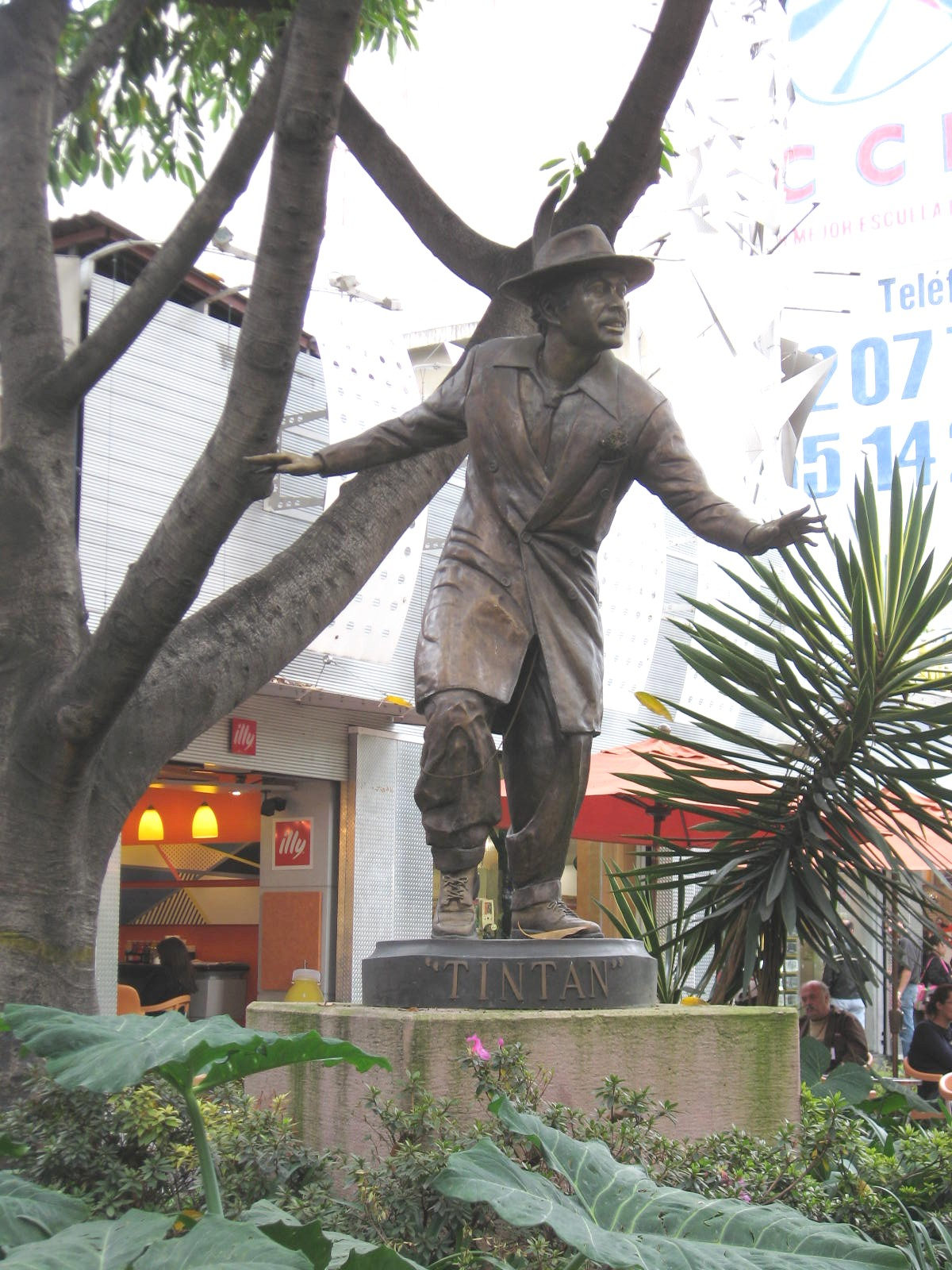
- The statue in 2008
- Subject: Germán Valdés (Tin Tan)
- Location: Mexico City, Mexico; 19°25′30.7″N 99°9′48.3″W

The statue of Germán Valdés, also known as Tin Tan, is installed along Genova Street in Zona Rosa, Mexico City, Mexico.
