= Yoo Young-ho =

South Korean sculptor

- Born: 1965 (age 60–61); Gangwon
- Occupation: Sculptor
- Years active: 1991–present

Korean name
- Hangul: 유영호
- RR: Yu Yeongho
- MR: Yu Yŏngho

Yoo Young-ho (Korean: 유영호, born 1965) is a South Korean sculptor.

== Career ==
He graduated in 1991 from the College of Fine Arts, Seoul National University. Later he studied at the Kunstakademie Düsseldorf in Germany.

One of his sculptures is located in Seoul's Digital City subsection. It is known as Square-M Communication, a piece of large-scale installation art that resembles a man looking at his own image on a screen. It is 7m in length, 6m in width, and 6m in height using blue-painted stainless steel, representing peace and neutrality. The sculpture is seen briefly in Marvel's The Avengers: Age of Ultron.

He became famous with his Greetingman project, consisting in huge blue-colored statues of a bowing person. One statue was installed in Montevideo, Uruguay. Yoo's intention was to start the project at the farthest place from Korea.

Yoo's idea is to promote peace around the world with his artistic concept; one of his statues has been erected near the Korean Demilitarized Zone, in Haean, Yanggu County, Gangwon, which was the battleground of one of the fiercest battles of the Korean War. Yoo plans to further erect 1000 statues in places like Vietnam, Berlin, and Palestine.

== Awards ==
- 2004 Kim Sejung Sculpture Award for Young Sculptors
- 2005/2006 Residence Program, National Museum of Contemporary Art, Seoul, Korea

== See also ==
- Greetingman
