= Korea–Mexico Friendship Hospital =

Hospital in Mérida, Yucatán, Mexico

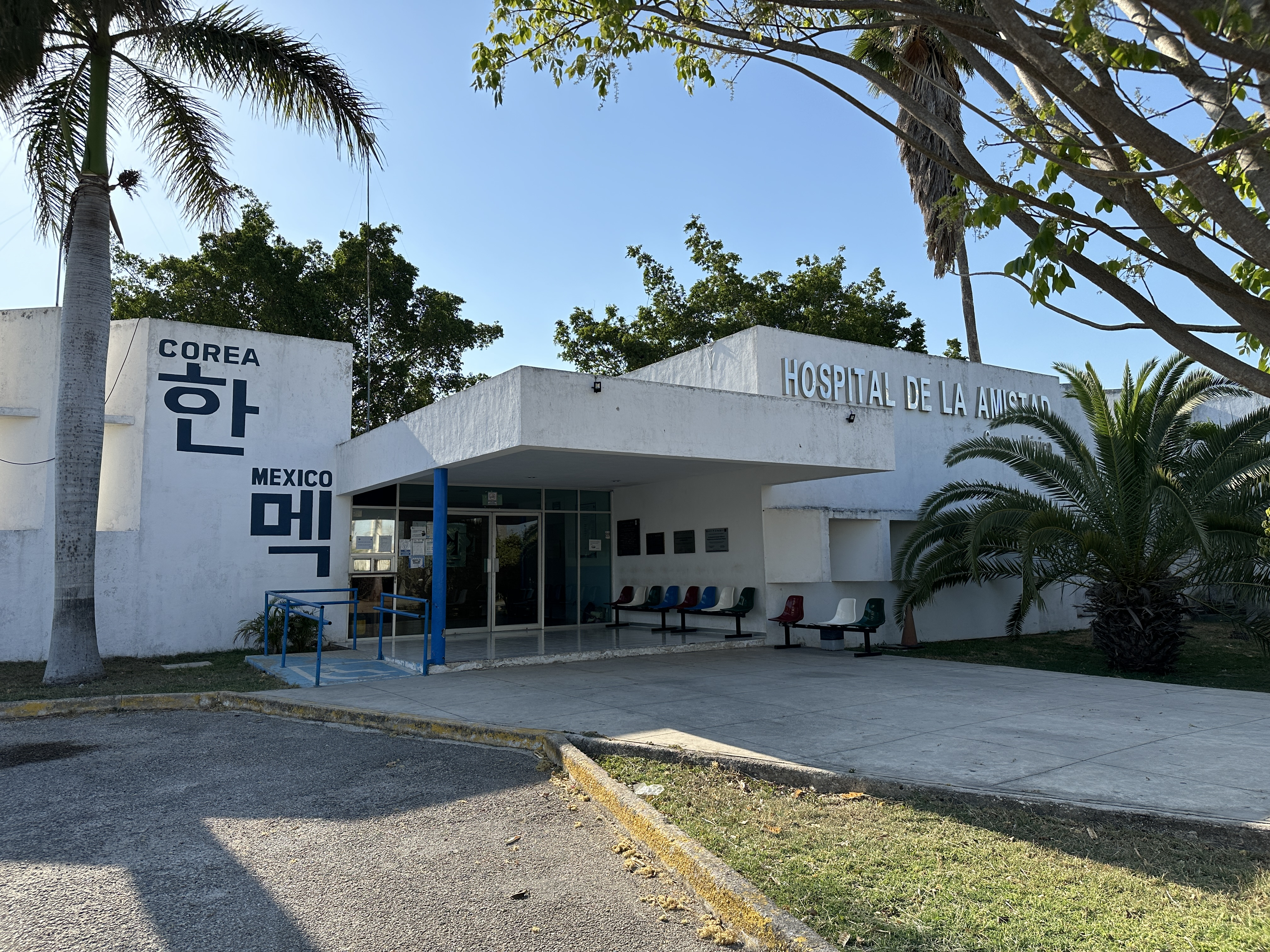
- The hospital (2024)

Geography
- Location: Calle 60 466, Sin Nombre de Col 16, 97000 Mérida, Yucatán, Mexico
- Coordinates: 20.9023°N 89.6395°W

History
- Opened: July 6, 2005

Links
- Website: hospitalamistad.yucatan.gob.mx (in Spanish)

The Korea–Mexico Friendship Hospital (Spanish: Hospital de la Amistad Corea-México; Korean: 한·멕 우정병원) is a hospital in Mérida, Yucatán, Mexico. It first opened on July 6, 2005.

It was established as part of commemorations for the 100th anniversary of Koreans arriving in Mexico. Land was provided by the Mexican government for the construction of the hospital. The South Korean government invested around US$1 million for the construction of the hospital. The hospital has since continued to receive hundreds of thousands of dollars in donations, as well as equipment from the South Korean government.

It has since become a notable hospital for treating children in the region, and played a significant role in combatting the COVID-19 pandemic.

== See also ==
- Koreans in Mexico
- Museo Conmemorativo de la Inmigracion Coreana a Yucatan – A museum on Koreans in the area, also in Mérida and also created in 2005
- Korean migration to Mexico centennial monument – A monument also in Mérida and also created in 2005
