= Koreans in Cuba =

Ethnic group

Korean Cubans
Coreano Cubanos 한국계 쿠바인

Total population
- 800

Regions with significant populations
- Havana · Matanzas

Languages
- Cuban Spanish

Related ethnic groups
- Korean Mexicans

Korean Cubans (Spanish: Coreano Cubanos, Korean: 한국계 쿠바인; RR: Hangukgye kubain) are citizens of Cuba of Korean ancestry. Most of them are descendants of Korean immigrant farmers from Mexico who left to Cuba in search of a better life. Today about 800 descendants of the Korean farmers live around Havana, Matanzas and other areas of Cuba.

== History of migration ==
The first ethnic Koreans to arrive in Cuba came from Mexico's Yucatán Peninsula in search of a better life. In 1905, 1,033 Koreans set sail on a cargo ship from Incheon to Yucatán. Upon arrival, instead of the riches they had been promised, all they found was the most menial type of labor. They were sold to 22 landlords and became sugarcane and hemp (henequen) cutters, toiling from sun-up till sundown in the dry and harsh tropical sun.

Korean immigrant Lim Cheontaek wrote a history book called Cubaiminsa in 1954 that describes the history of Korean immigrants living in Cuba.

== Language ==
Most Korean Cubans today speak the Spanish language. A Cuba-Korea culture center was built in 1921 that taught Korean writing and history in an attempt to remind the descendants of their heritage. But lack of funding shuttered the center and now it is hard to find a descendant of the Korean immigrants who can speak the Korean language.

== See also ==
- Asian Latin Americans
- Asian Hispanic and Latino Americans
- Chinese Cubans
- Japanese Cubans
