= Koreans in Mexico =

Ethnic group

Korean Mexicans
Mexicanos Coreanos 재멕시코 한국인
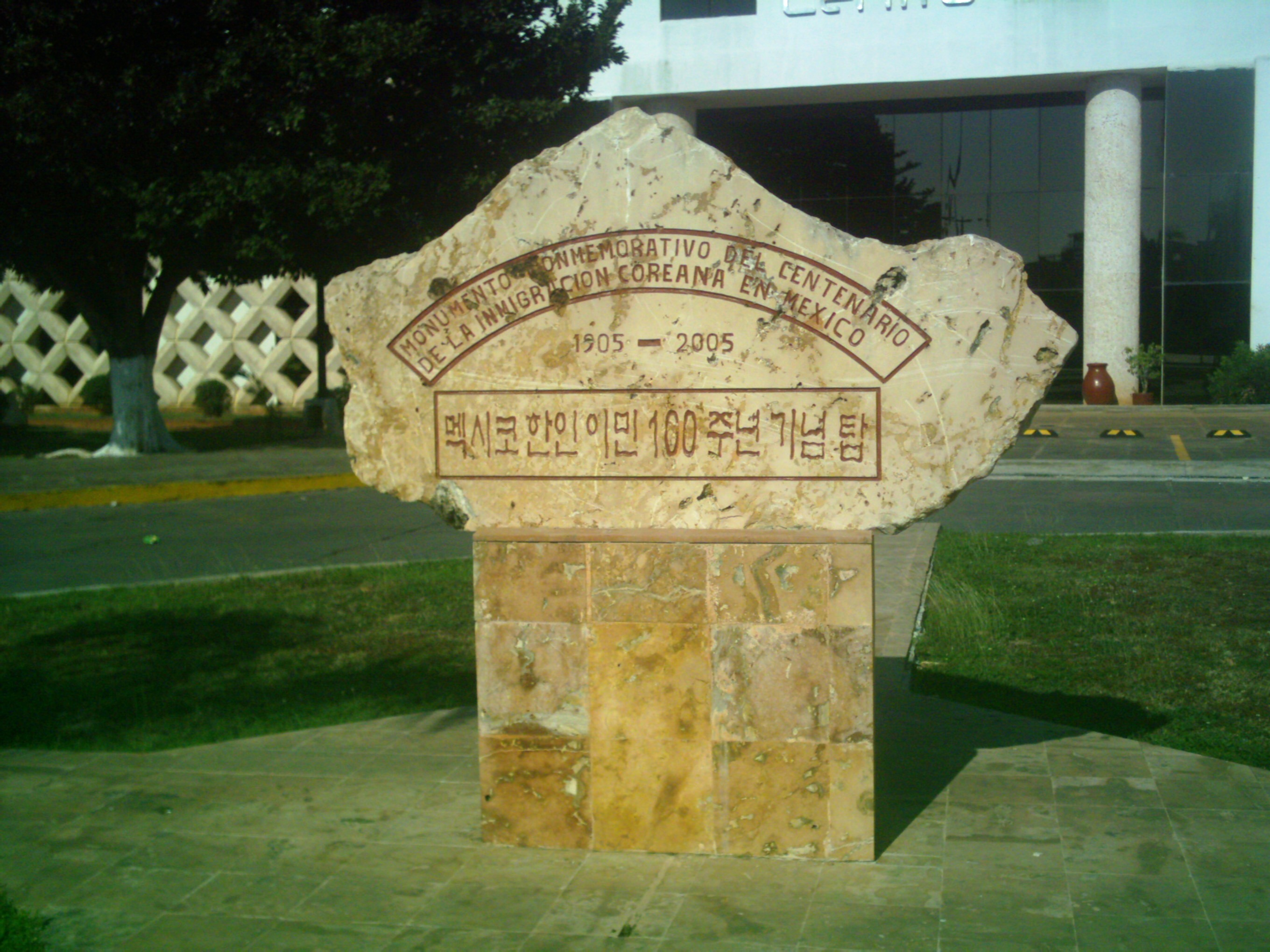
- Korean migration to Mexico centennial monument in Mérida, Yucatán (2012)

Total population
- 11,800 (resident S. Korean nationals, 2011 est.)

Regions with significant populations
- Yucatán, Coatzacoalcos, Salina Cruz, Mexico City, Guadalajara, Monterrey, León, Querétaro, Puebla, Tlaxcala, Ecatepec, Chiconcuac, Colima, Nayarit, Aguascalientes, Toluca, Valle de Bravo, Tijuana

Languages
- Korean, Spanish

Religion
- Christianity, Mahayana Buddhism

Related ethnic groups
- Korean diaspora, Asian Mexicans

Korean immigration to Mexico began in 1905. The first Korean migrant workers settled in Yucatán, while more recent migrants from South Korea often choose Mexico City as their destination. According to an embassy estimate, as of 2011, approximately 11,800 Korean nationals live in Mexico, with thousands more Mexican nationals of full or partial Korean descent.

== Migration history ==
=== Early 20th century ===
In the late 19th century, social instability and natural disasters in Korea resulted in increasing emigration from the country. At first, emigrants chose nearby destinations such as Northeast China and the Russian Far East. By the early 20th century they began going farther afield, for example in 1902 to Hawaii. However, increasing Japanese influence on the Korean peninsula made this controversial: Japanese labor brokers were opposed to Koreans choosing Hawaii as their destination, believing this would interfere with Japanese migration there and they lobbied Japanese foreign minister Komura Jutarō to address the situation. Meanwhile, in Mexico, there was increasing interest in hiring workers from Asia to address labor shortages in the agricultural sector, but the Japanese government placed restrictions on the recruitment of labor migrants for Mexico due to the expectation of poor conditions and the Chinese government was also opposed due to previous experiences with poor treatment of Chinese workers in Peru.

It was against this background that labor brokers began advertising in newspapers in the Korean port city of Incheon in 1904 for workers willing to go to Mexico to work on henequen plantations for four or five-year contracts. Working conditions proved to be harsh with workers being beaten or jailed for either not working or not producing the status quo. A total of more than one thousand were recruited and departed from port of Chemulpo, present (Jung District), Incheon on board a British cargo ship on 4 April 1905, despite efforts by the Korean government to block their departure. They arrived at the Mexican port of Salina Cruz, Oaxaca about a month later on 8 May 1905, from there taking trains to their final destination: Progreso, Yucatán.

By the time their contracts ended, most had not even saved enough money to pay for the return voyage to Korea, despite earlier promises of high wages by recruiters, and furthermore saw little attraction in going back to their no-longer-independent homeland. Most thus settled in Mexico, either continuing to work on henequen plantations or moving to various cities in the country. Some made efforts at onward migration: a Korean American community organization in San Francisco tried to bring some of them to Hawaii, but to no avail. In 1921, after the collapsing demand for henequen fiber threatened their livelihoods, 288 Koreans set off for Cuba from the port of Campeche. About eight hundred of their descendants still live in Cuba.

=== Late 20th and early 21st centuries ===
A new wave of Korean migrants began coming to Mexico in the 1970s. These consisted both of people coming straight from South Korea, as well as members of Korean diaspora communities in other countries of the Americas—particularly from Paraguay and from Argentina—seeking to try their luck in Mexico. Up until the late 1980s their numbers seem to have remained quite small; the Asociación Coreana en México counted only 64 families and 15 or 20 single people among its members. Larger numbers began arriving in the 1990s: according to South Korean government statistics, the size of the community reached its peak in 1997 with around 19,500 individuals before falling to 14,571 by 2005.

== Demography ==
=== Population estimates ===
According to the 2011 report of South Korea's Ministry of Foreign Affairs and Trade on overseas Korean populations, 11,800 overseas Koreans resided in Mexico, down by 2% since the 2009 report. Among them were 876 Mexican citizens, 1,607 South Korean citizens with Mexican permanent resident status, 388 South Korean international students, and the remainder being South Korean citizens with other types of visas. Mexico City was their most common area of residence, with 6,340 recorded as living there; 1,300 others lived in Jalisco state, with the remainder in other locations.

The 2010 Mexican census recorded 3,960 people who responded that their place of birth was South Korea, up from 327 in the previous census in 2010. This made South Korea the 18th-largest foreign country of origin in Mexico, but those born in South Korea comprised only about 0.4% of the 961,121 total foreign-born persons the census found to be residing in the country. A 2012 report by Mexico's National Institute of Migration, based on 2009 statistics, stated that 534 North Korean citizens and 6,028 South Korean citizens lived in Mexico. A plurality but not a majority of each of those groups (258 and 2,261) lived in Mexico City. By migration status, 317 of the North Koreans and 2,970 of the South Koreans were non-immigrants. Each group had a sex ratio somewhat imbalanced towards males.

Other sources also report a wide variety of population estimates. A September 2013 article in The New York Times, citing officials at the Korean Cultural Center, Mexico City, stated that "at least 12,000 Koreans now call Mexico home". The article stated that in 2010 the Korean population in Mexico was ten times as large as the said population in 2000. In contrast, a 2008 report from the Los Angeles Times claimed that the descendants of early henequen plantation laborers alone might number as many as thirty thousand.

=== Centers of Korean population ===
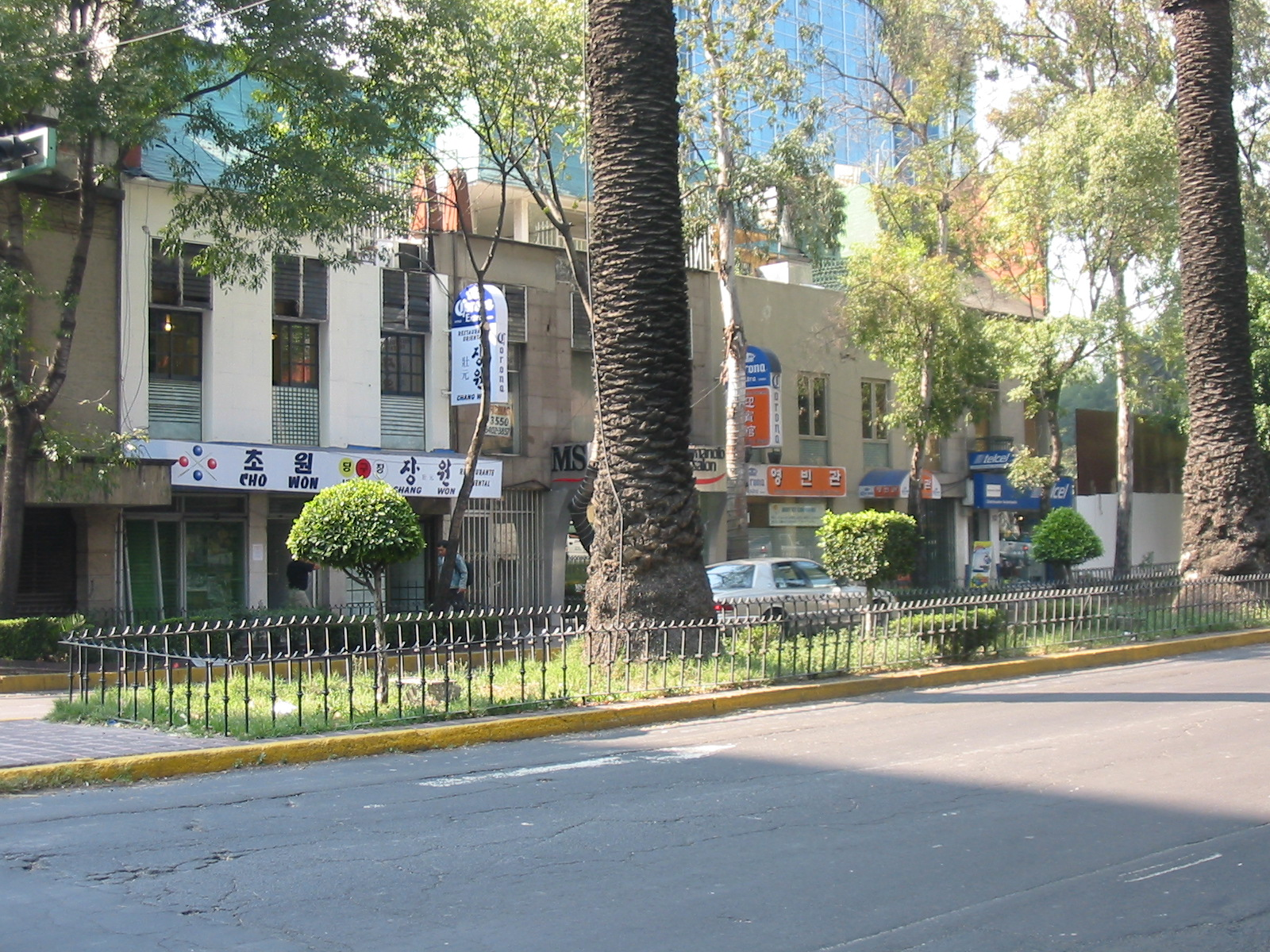
Korean businesses in Pequeño Seúl (2007)

Mexico City's Zona Rosa district has a Koreatown known as Pequeño Seúl (Little Seoul), filled with businesses established by the new migrants. There, many Korean restaurants can be found as well as hair salons, bakeries, and daycare centers. In the 1990s, others also set up shop in Tepito. Other districts in Mexico City where Koreans live include Colonia Juárez, Santa Fe, Interlomas, Polanco and Anzures.

Other centers of Korean population include:

- Yucatán, where there can be found descendants of Korean immigrants who worked as indentured laborers on the henequen plantations in the late 19th and early 20th century. These Koreans, many of whom are of mixed Korean and local descent, are often called aenikkaeng (Korean: 애니깽) after the henequen plantations on which they worked.
- Tijuana in Baja California where, for example, the Chuseok Harvest Festival is celebrated
- In the north-central states of Jalisco, Colima, Aguascalientes, and Nayarit, a community of about a thousand Koreans; within Jalisco, Koreans are concentrated in Guadalajara and Zapopan. The University of Nayarit offers Korean language course and a degree in Korean studies, the only one in Latin America.
- The Monterrey Metropolitan area suburb of Huinalá, Apodaca) has a new Koreatown filled with businesses in Korean and Spanish.
- Juriquilla, Querétaro, north of Querétaro City, where a Korean community has established itself in the area for foreign investment, like the Samsung plant located at the Parque Industrial Juriquilla, north of Querétaro City.
- Pesquería, Nuevo León is a town in the north of Mexico where Kia motors opened a plant. 6,000 South Koreans arrived the area. South Korean businesses, and Korean and Spanish text billboards, abound in the city, and the town is referred to as "Pescorea".

== Culture ==
=== Language and education ===
Henequen plantation workers, initially seeing Mexico solely as a place of sojourn rather than of settlement, initially made little effort to learn either Spanish or the local indigenous languages. However, as their stay in the country became permanent, they slowly began to abandon the Korean language, and their descendants speak only Spanish. In contrast, more recent migrants retain Korean as their dominant language. A 2006 survey of 160 Korean migrants in Mexico City, both those from South Korea and those from other Korean diaspora populations of the Americas, found that 92% used Korean as the language of communication with their families; 6% used both Korean and Spanish, and only the remaining 2% used Spanish exclusively or English as well. With regards to their command of Spanish, 21% stated that they could understand newspapers, 52% stated that they could hold simple conversations, and the remaining 27% stated that they could only make simple greetings or had no command of the language.

There is a weekend school aimed at preserving knowledge of the Korean language among heritage speakers: the Escuela Coreana en México, located in Mexico City. For two decades from the 1990s up until 2010 it occupied a variety of rented facilities, but that year it was able to acquire its own premises thanks to US$850,000 donations by companies and other benefactors to the Asociación de Residentes Coreanos en México. It is currently located in Zona Rosa.

The Korean-language paper newspaper Hanin Diario (Korean: 한인신문; Hanja: 韓人新聞; RR: Hanin Sinmun) has been published in Mexico City since the 1990s.

=== Religion ===
Early Korean migrants to Mexico included a few Christians whose emigration was motivated by the desire to find a place to freely practice their religion. Among more recent arrivals, both Christians and Buddhists are present. The former planted many churches in the 1990s, while the latter established two temples in the 2000s.

Branches of the World Mission Society Church of God, a South Korea-based church, are present in Estado de México, Morelos, Puebla, Nuevo León, and Jalisco, with the Mexican headquarters in Tacuba, Mexico City.

=== Other organizations ===
The Korean Association in Mexico (Spanish: Asociación Coreana en México, Korean: 멕시코 한인회) organizes concerts, protests at the North Korean embassy, and other activities.

In Polanco, Mexico City, there is a Korean cultural center, Korean Cultural Center, Mexico City, with activities both artistic (exhibitions, traditional music concerts, folk art shows) and academic (language and Korean history courses).

Mérida, Yucatán is host to a number of things related to Korea, including the Museum of Korean Immigration (Museo Conmemorativo de la Inmigración Coreana a Yucatán), the Korea–Mexico Friendship Hospital, the Korean migration to Mexico centennial monument, and the road Avenida República de Corea.

=== In literature ===
One literary portrayal of the early Korean community in Mexico was Kim Young-ha's 2003 Korean-language novel Black Flower, translated into English by Charles La Shure. The book won Kim the 2004 Dong-in Literary Award as well as a nomination for the 2012 Man Asian Literary Prize.

== Notable individuals ==
Dai-won Moon is a South Korean-born, naturalized Mexican martial artist and is known as the "Father of Mexican Taekwondo".

Ssoni Park is a hair stylist with a salon in Pequeño Seúl (Zona Rosa) who attracts clients from across the country including many models, actors and singers, including the Banda el Recodo, Klezmeron, friends of architect Michel Rojkind, and those who sought her services after she appeared in the credits of a short film by Raquel Romero Monterrubio.

Digital creator Sujin Kim, better known as Chingu Amiga, is also one of the best-known Koreans in Mexico and Latin America. She moved from South Korea to Monterrey in 2016 to work in the Mexican headquarters of Korean companies as a graduate economist. She studied International relations at the Autonomous University of Nuevo León in the Faculty of Political Sciences and International Relations. Kim also worked as a Korean-language teacher at the same university and on her own website. In 2021, she gained recognition on social media with short videos in which she shared her life and her experiences as a Korean living in Mexico, gaining more than 20 million followers on TikTok and 7 million on YouTube.

== See also ==
- Mexico–North Korea relations
- Mexico–South Korea relations
- Pequeño Seúl
- Pescorea
