= Zona Rosa, Mexico City =

Zona Rosa
- Neighborhood
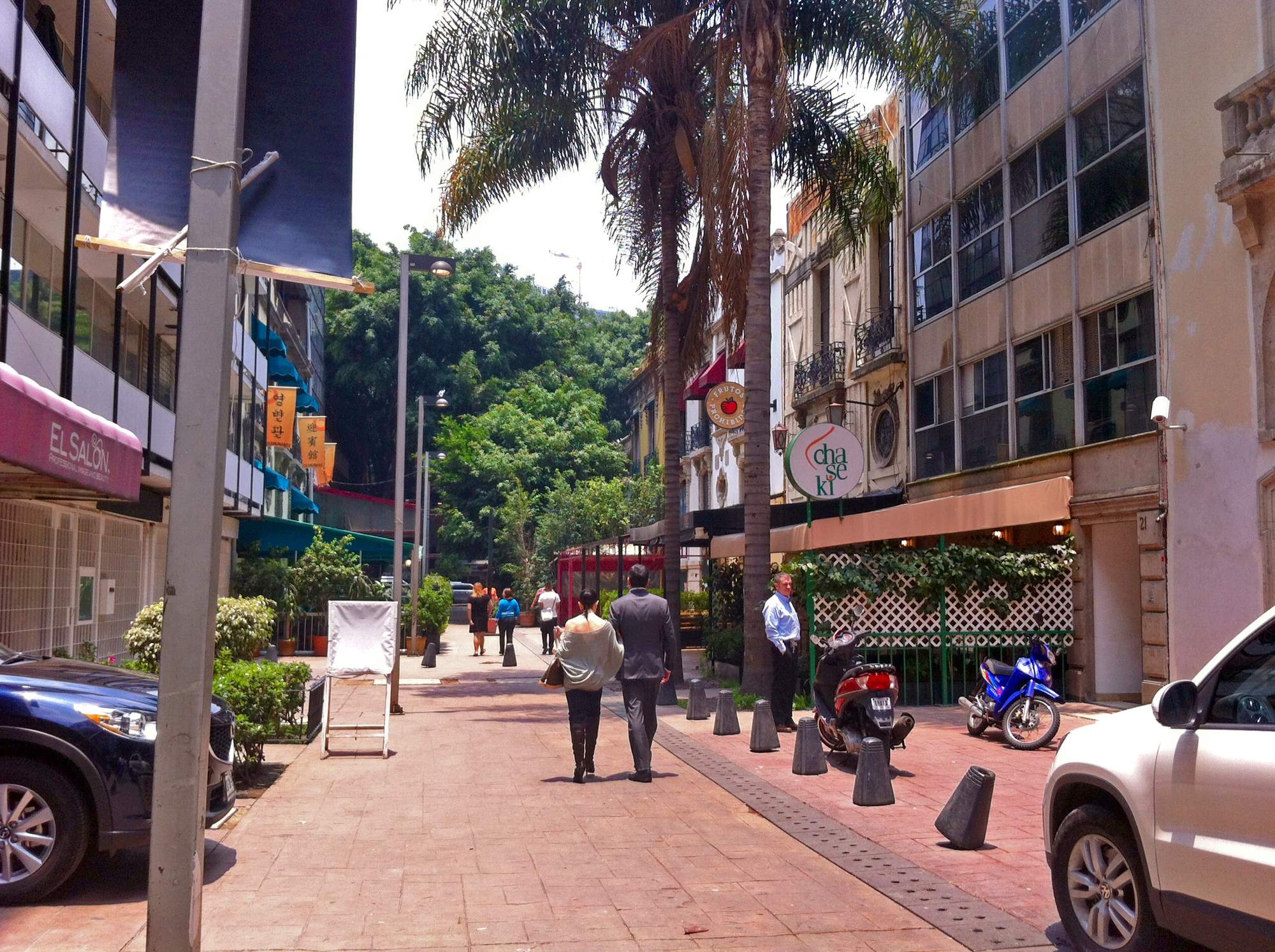
- A Zona Rosa street scene

- Location in Mexico City
- Coordinates: 19°25′32.87″N 99°9′50.94″W
- Country: Mexico
- City: Mexico City
- Borough: Cuauhtémoc

Population
  - Total: ≈3,000

The Zona Rosa as defined by Publimetro (see References below): Paseo de la Reforma (north), Avenida Insurgentes (east), Avenida Chapultepec (south) and Varsovia (west)

Zona Rosa ('Pink Zone') is an area in Mexico City which is known for its shopping, nightlife, LGBT community, and its recently established Korean community. The larger official neighborhood it is part of is Colonia Juárez, located just west of the historic center of Mexico City.

The area's history as a community began when it was developed as a residential district for wealthy foreigners and Mexico City residents looking to move from the city center. The development of the area stalled during and after the Mexican Revolution. From the 1950s to 1980s the neighborhood was revitalized by artists, intellectuals and the city's elite who repopulated the area, gave it a bohemian reputation and attracted exclusive restaurants and clubs for visiting politicians and other notables. It was during this time that the area received the name of Zona Rosa, from José Luis Cuevas. The era ended in the 1980s, when many of the upscale businesses moved out and tourism, men's clubs, prostitution and crime moved in.

Although the area declined during the 1980s, it is still a major shopping and entertainment district and has also become a major tourist attraction for the city, one that the city has worked to preserve and rehabilitate since the 2000s, with mixed success. From the 1990s, the area has also become home to Mexico City's gay community, which is prominent around Amberes Street and sponsors an annual pride parade on Paseo de la Reforma.

Its neighbours Colonia Roma to the south create one of the major hotspots for nightlife, dining and culture in the city.

== Etymology ==
The origin of the name Zona Rosa ("pink zone"), according to Cuauhtémoc borough, stems from the fact that several buildings were painted pink, a detail mentioned by author Carlos Fuentes in La región más transparente ("Where the Air Is Clear").

This mix of bohemian and propriety prompted artist José Luis Cuevas to commend "Es demasiado ingenua para ser roja, pero demasiado frívola para ser blanca, por eso es precisamente rosa (is too naive to be red, but too frivolous to be white, for this reason it is precisely pink)", that is, the area is a red-light district at night and a "white-light district" during the day.

A third theory is that the name is a tribute to the Cuban-Mexican actress Rosa Carmina. Other sources attribute the name to the journalist and television presenter Agustín Barrios Gómez Méndez (not to be confused with his son, politician Agustín Barrios Gómez Segués).

== History ==
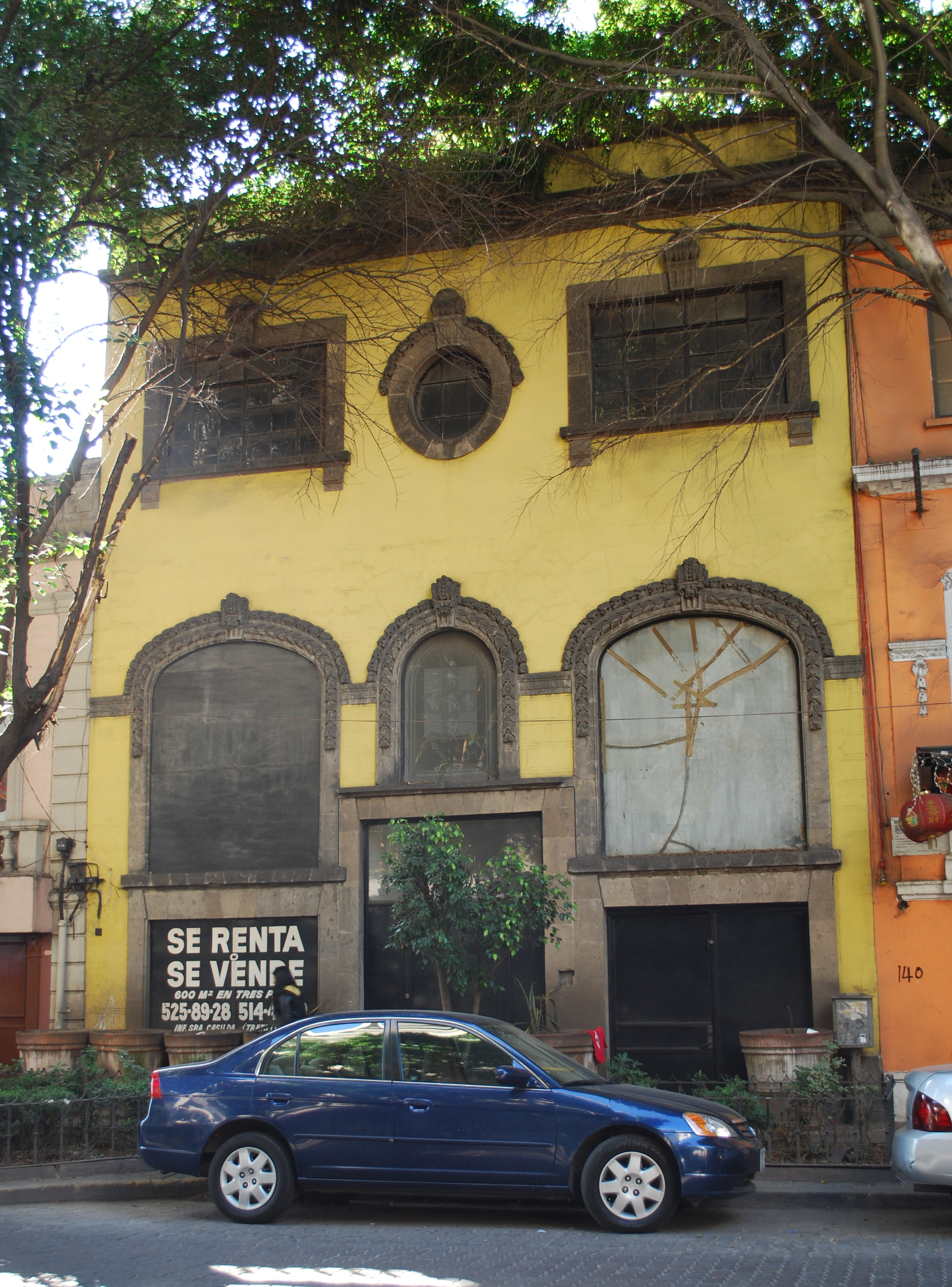
Abandoned house from the early 20th century on Hamburgo Street

Zona Rosa began to be developed along with the rest of Colonia Juárez in the mid-19th century; however, it has always had an independent identity. Originally the area was called “La Teja”, then “La Zona Americana” or “Colonia Americana”, as presidents from Benito Juárez to Porfirio Díaz promoted it for foreign investment and residency up until the early 20th century. The area also attracted Mexico City's elite who were looking to escape the city center. During this time, the area was filled with cafes, pastry shops, and a number of green areas designed to create a European atmosphere. For this reason the streets were named after European cities such as Hamburg (Hamburgo), London (Londres), Copenhagen (Copenhague), Genoa (Genova), Nice (Niza), and Liverpool. The Mexican Revolution put an end to the building here and the initial mansions remained, but many were abandoned.

Nevertheless, the area remained one of the more glamorous zones for most of the 20th century. Expensive cafes and restaurants, art galleries, and jewelry stores continued to attract wealthy residents, although on a reduced scale.

=== Bohemian appeal ===
In the 1950s, the area was repopulated and reinvigorated by artists and intellectuals attracted to its location between the historic center and Chapultepec Park. This period saw the opening of trendy bars, clubs, restaurants, cafes, bookstores, and art galleries which gave the area a bohemian feel.

Pasaje Jacaranda—sometimes considered Mexico City's first shopping center—opened on Genova Street in the 1959 and featured floor-to-ceiling glass windows and other innovative, contemporary architecture, designed by Ramón Torres Martínez and Héctor Velázquez Moreno, and its restaurants and cafés were gathering places for the creative class.

By the 1960s, politicians such as Adolfo López Mateos, Adolfo Ruiz Cortines, and Miguel Alemán, as well as painters such as José Luis Cuevas and writers such as Carlos Fuentes and Carlos Monsivais, lived, worked and visited the clubs here such as Café Kineret. Fine restaurants were established such as Focolare in 1953, La Gondola in 1958 and Passy, also in 1958. These three don't exist anymore. Clubs and restaurants were exclusive, with dress codes. However, there were also several clubs known for chorus girls. One of these was the Can-can, on the corner of Hamburgo and Genova Streets.

Architect José Luis Benlliure Galán commented in 1960 on:

[the] extremely high price of the land, as part of it cost 10,000 [pesos (800 U.S. dollars) per] square meter, the highest figure to date in Mexico. The area is currently the highest quality in the city: large hotels, luxury retail, embassies, restaurants, etc.… [The price of real estate along] Niza [street] is equivalent to that of the Calle de Serrano in Madrid, the Via Veneto in Rome, the Rue de la Paix in Paris, etc. Equivalent. I am not saying it is comparable in beauty to the Via Veneto, for example.

In 1967, Cuevas created a mural on a rooftop in Zona Rosa only to destroy it seconds afterwards. This event was meant to rebel against the social and political content of most of Mexico's post-Revoluction mural movement. In 2003, a reproduction of Cuevas’ “ephemeral mural” was placed on the same rooftop on which the artist created and destroyed the original. This era of Zona Rosa's development continued until the 1980s. During this time many galleries, bohemian bars and restaurants opened. The area was considered to be tolerant, intellectual and cosmopolitan. It even had its own literary magazine called Zona Rosa.

=== Decline ===
Problems in the area began as early as 1968, when the construction of the Mexico City Metro caused the area to lose its exclusiveness and crime increased. Real deterioration began when the older, finer businesses such as boutiques and galleries moved out, mostly due to the economic crisis of the 1980s and the 1985 Mexico City earthquake, which substantially damaged the area. Many of the more exclusive businesses were replaced by men's clubs, gay bars, and massage parlors, which has made Zona Rosa more “red” than “pink”. As the area was promoted for tourism, fast-food places, nightclubs, and bars sprung up, which have engendered problems with underage drinking and prostitution.

La Ronda was an establishment visited by intellectuals such as Guadalupe Amor and Manuel Felgueres, but today it is a men's club named Foxy's. Other establishments, such as a bar named Tirol once located in one of the area's old mansions, have simply shut down and their buildings remain deserted. Many of the stores selling jewelry, arts and other fine merchandise have been converted into stores with more mass-produced items and souvenirs. Another change occurred in the vicinity of Amberes Street, where bars, clubs and other businesses catering to the gay community have appeared. These are distinguished by the use of rainbow colors on their facades.

Most of the decline of the area occurred in the 1980s and 1990s, when the city was governed by appointees of the federal government. In the late 1990s, the city government began to be elected by residents and in 1997, the ruling PRI lost power in the city to the PRD. The new city government was more interested in promoting and restoring the neighborhood. Tourist police were implemented, and efforts to better regulate businesses, control prostitutions, repair infrastructure and promote tourism were undertaken at various times during the 2000s.

These efforts have had mixed success. The city has conducted some high-profile raids of clubs such as the Bar Continental DJ Club, searching for drugs and minors. This operation eventually led to the expropriation of the property on Florencia Street as well as another club on Berna Street. They mayor stated it was part of ongoing operations and meant to be a warning to other club owners in the area. The expropriated building on Florence Street now houses a contingent of the Mexico City police. There have also been other raids in response to complaints about underage drinking and illegal gambling.

In late 2005, serial killer Raúl Osiel Marroquín frequented the area in search of gay men to kidnap. Marroquín, who expressed deep hatred for gay men, kidnapped and brutally tortured six men, killing four of them. He was arrested in January 2006 and sentenced to 280 years in prison. Due to targeting gay men, Marroquín is known as The Rainbow Killer.

In 2007, a public-private venture was started to connect and promote Zona Rosa along with the historic center as the Reforma-Centro Historico corridor. Crime has decreased, but residents and businesses continue to move out, while more “red” businesses move in. In 2004, two theaters were opened exclusively to show erotic movies under the name of Contempo Cinema. According to the owners, the movies shown are not pornography but rather films such as Last Tango in Paris, Basic Instinct and Wild Orchid, which do not have explicit sex scenes meriting an XXX rating. The new venues have about 200 seats each with a bar, restaurants and film store.

Work on infrastructure has been completed, mostly on Genova and Hamburgo Streets, but residents complain that the work is too slow, hurting their businesses. There are fears that these interventions, along with those scheduled between 2010 and 2012, will not be enough to save the area.

=== Current renaissance ===
Between 2010 and 2026, Zona Rosa finally came out of its long period of decay and re-established itself as a cultural and commercial node. After decades of deteriorated sidewalks and drainage problems, the Cuauhtémoc borough launched a more-than-12 million-dollar overhaul in 2017, resurfacing 15 streets with hydraulic concrete and renovasting water lines. In the 2020s, the borough partially pedestrianized and repaved Amberes and Génova streets, introduced targeted policing efforts in order to reduce extortion and street crime. By 2026, preparations for the 2026 FIFA World Cup and private investment resulted in renovated boutique hotels, more nightlife, and the opening of ethnic-Korean commercial establishments along Florencia and Hamburgo streets, forming the area's current multifaceted identity as Pequeño Seúl ("Little Seoul", the city's Koreatown) , ground zero for Mexico City's LGBT community, in addition to its continued status as a center of nightlife and hotels, albeit no longer the city's most prestigious, and as an area attracting many visitors.

== Description ==
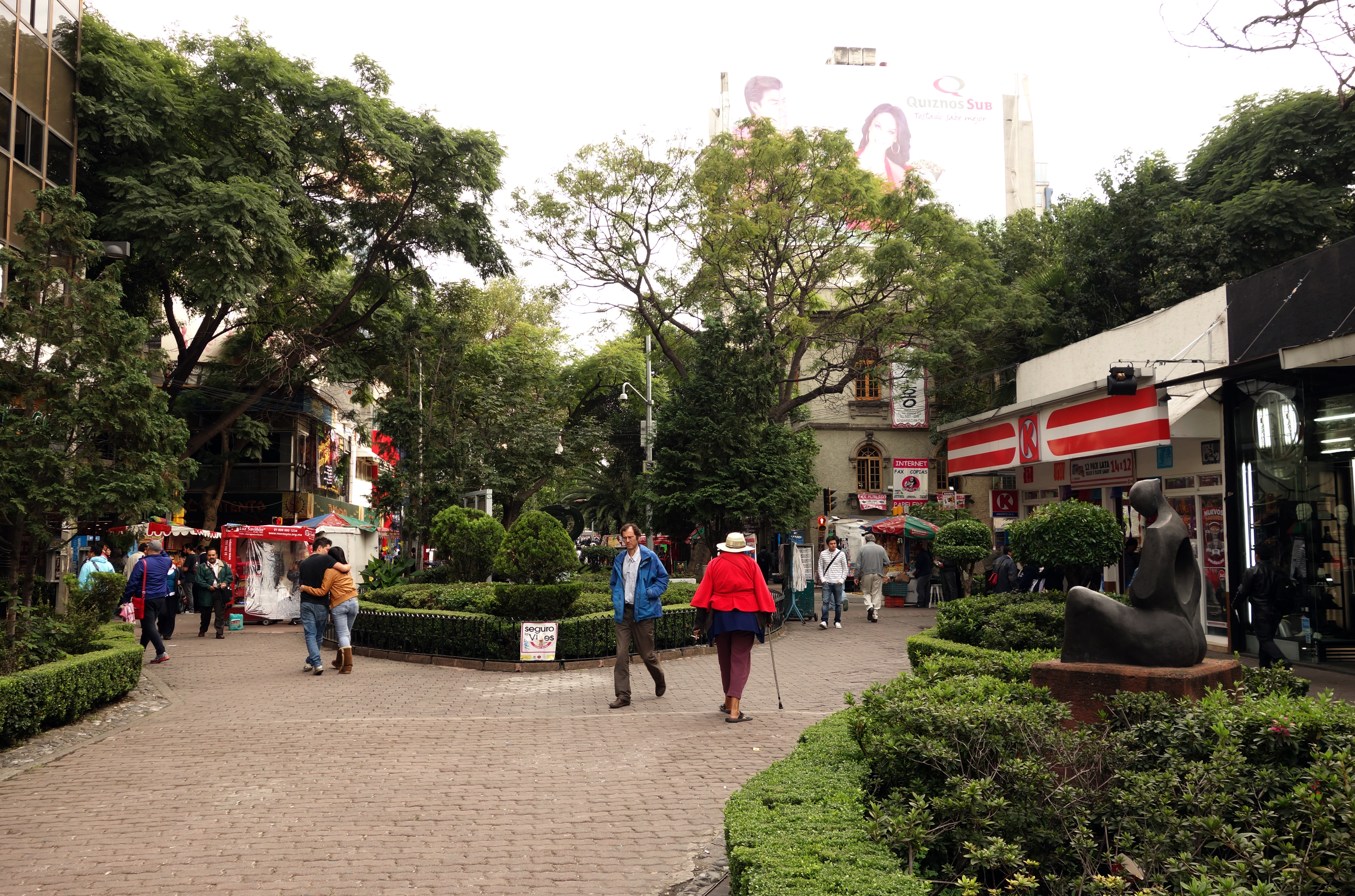
Genova Street in Zona Rosa

Zona Rosa is a portion of the official neighborhood of Colonia Juárez, comprising 24 of the colonia's 99 city blocks. The borders of the area are formed by Paseo de la Reforma to the north, Varsovia Street to the west, Avenida Insurgentes to the east and Chapultepec Avenue and Metro Insurgentes to the south. Most of the streets in the area are named after European cities. A number of these streets are made of cobblestone, with two pedestrian-only. About 40 sculptures – 17 created by young artists from the Escuela Nacional de Artes Plasticas of UNAM – have been installed on various streets, sponsored by the Rotary Club of Zona Rosa.

The area is one of Mexico City's primary shopping districts and nightclub areas. Streets are filled with bars and nightclubs, which fill on weekends. Among these clubs, men's clubs with table dances and gay bars stand out. In total, there are 714 businesses in the area, 137 of which are restaurants, which cater to foreign and Mexican visitors as well as businessmen who work on nearby Paseo de la Reforma. From its bohemian and intellectual heritage, there are also art galleries, bookstores and the like.

One echo from the area's past are a number of early 20th-century mansions built when the area was an exclusive residential area for Mexico City's wealthy. These homes were designed to look European, especially French. Some of these still remain, such as the one at 115 Hamburgo Street, but most are abandoned.

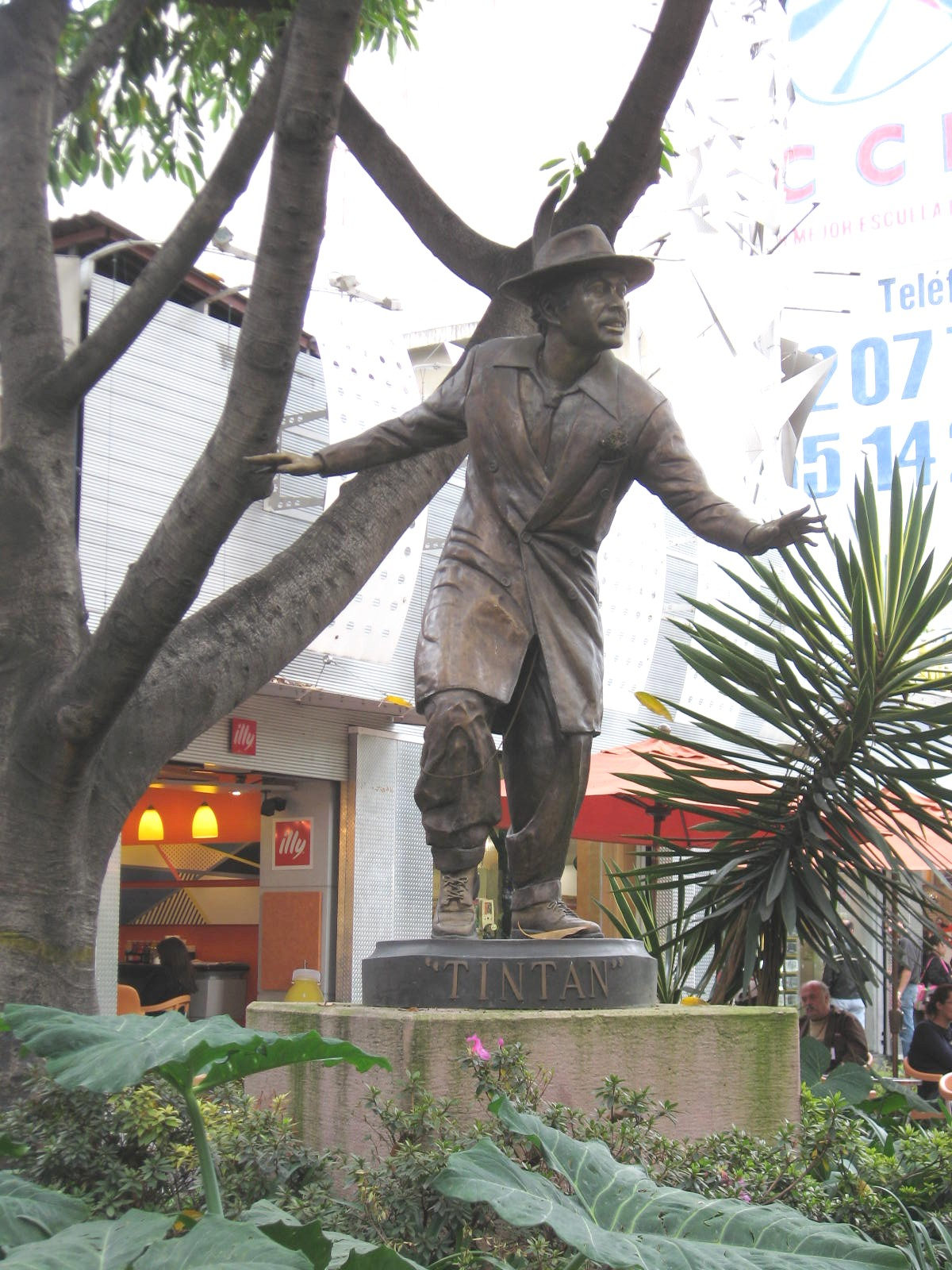
Statue of Tin Tan, or Germán Valdés, on Genova Street

Leading to the area from the Insurgentes Metro is Genova Street, a pedestrian mall lined with eateries, 13 of which own areas on the street on which to put tables. It is popular with both locals and foreign visitors. Here, dozens of people handing out flyers stop pedestrians and drivers advertising gay bars and men's clubs, some of which operate illegally. It is also the site of the Corridor de Arte José Luis Cuevas, which occurs on weekends when an average of 40 artists display their works for sale. On this street stand around 40 sculptures created by young artists of the Escuela Nacional de Artes Plasticas of UNAM.

Despite the installation of tourist police and other efforts, crime is still a problem in the area. The streets with the most problems are Londres, Hamburgo, Florencia, Liverpool, Niza, Amberes and Genova.

=== Gay community ===
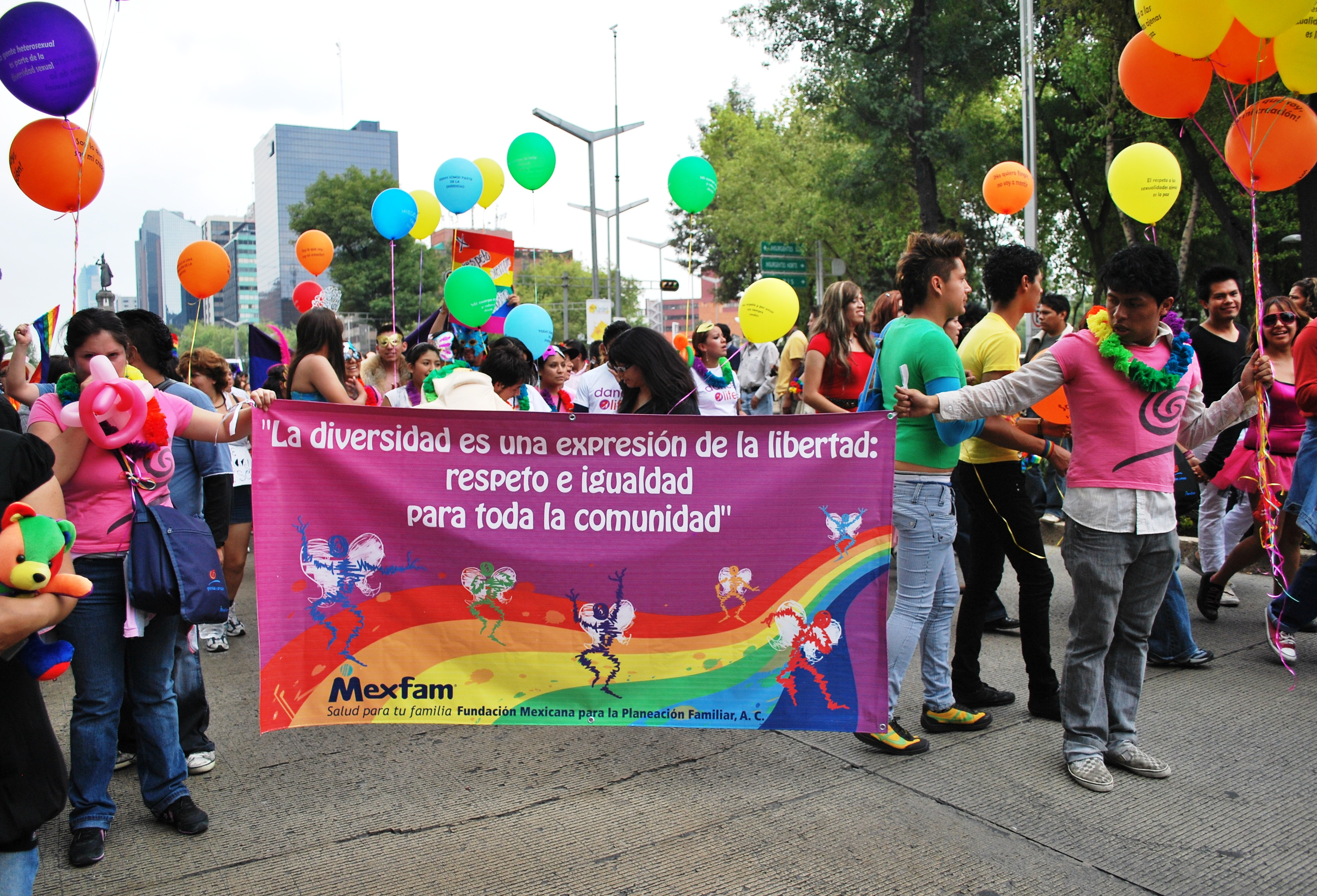
Marchers at the 2009 Gay Pride Parade

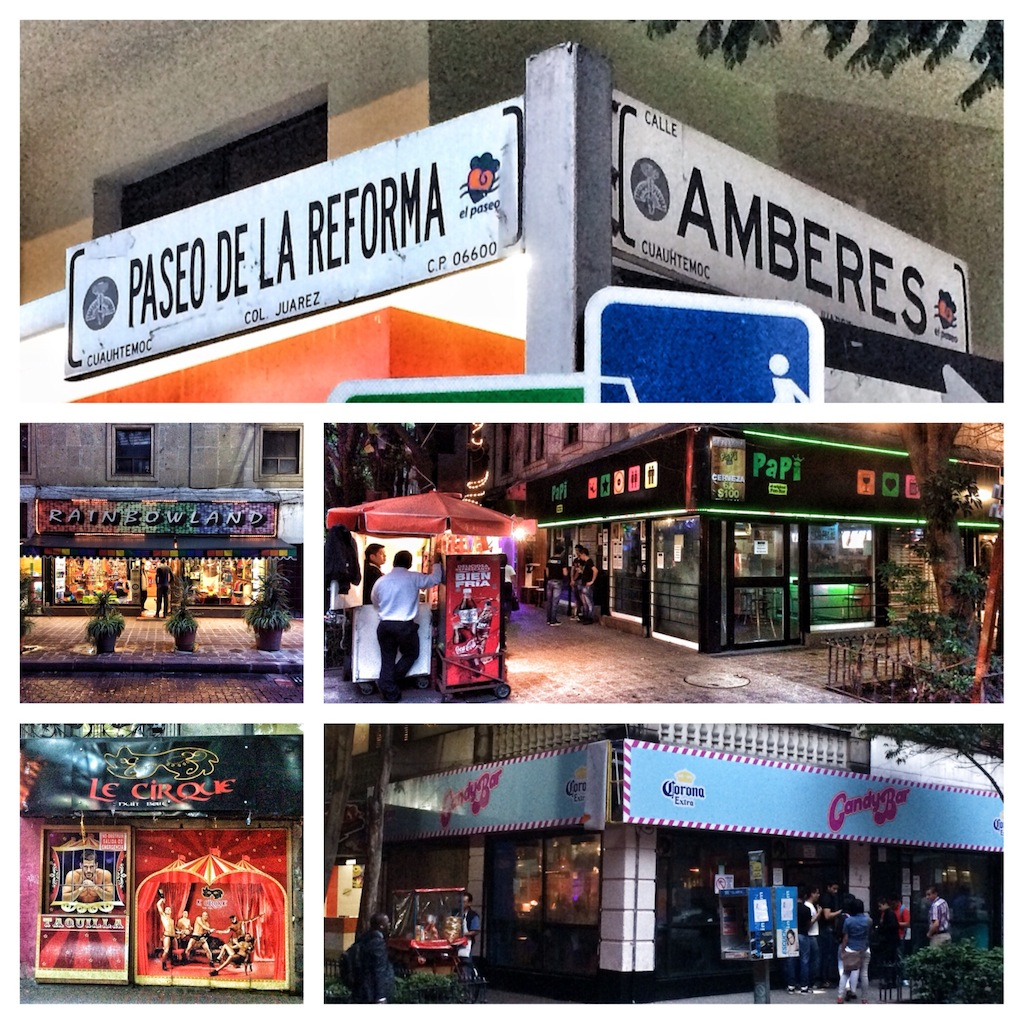
Amberes street in Mexico City's Zona Rosa is lined with gay bars.

Another prominent area is Amberes Street, home to Mexico City's gay community. This community was established in the 1990s due to the area's overall tolerance and the fact that police here did not extort members of the gay community. Today, homosexuality on Amberes Streets and the rest of Zona Rosa is fairly open with handholding and kissing among same-sex couples. This has led it to be compared to Barrio de Chueca in Madrid and the Castro District in San Francisco. It is famous for being a gay encounter area, especially for young gay men, with some being minors. A number of gay men make money through prostitution, mostly younger men soliciting older men. In 2010, the city opened a consulting office for homosexuals wishing to take advantage of Mexico City's law allowing them to marry.

Zona Rosa is one of three areas in Mexico City where gay bars and other businesses operate, along with Plaza Garibaldi and an area on Avenida Insurgentes South. However, Zona Rosa is the largest of these and considered to be the gay community's business center, with over 200 businesses spread over 16 blocks. These bars, clubs, and other entertainment places mostly cater to younger crowds and play reggaeton, psycho-punk, etc., with lasers, strobe lights and other typical decor. However, these businesses are usually marked with rainbow colored flags or other decorations on the facade. Singles and couples dance sensually and sometimes a cloud of generated smoke covers the dance floor. Touching and kissing between couples of the same sex is highly tolerated in many of these clubs. Some also have “dark rooms” where patrons can find privacy for more intimate acts. A number also have unofficial dress codes.

Zona Rosa's annual pride parade is officially called the Marcha del Orgullo Lésbico, Gay, Bisexual, Transgénero, Travesti, Transsexual e Intersexual (LGBTTTI) (March of Lesbian, Gay, Bisexual, Transgender, Transvestite, Transsexual and Intersexual Pride). It was first held in 1978 with about 300 people participating. During this event, the nightclubs, discothèques and bars of Zona Rosa fill with members of the LGBT community starting at midday. Many businesses, whether they cater to gays or not, are decorated with rainbow colored balloons, streamers and other items. Despite the crowds, police presence is not significantly heightened.

The parade usually marches along Paseo de la Reforma from Puerta de los Leones to the Glorieta de la Palma, with the entire stretch completely closed to traffic for the event. The city has even participated, offering free AIDS tests to attendees. In 2003, there were more than 20,000 participants. The 2010 march adopted the theme of "Marcha del Bicentenario, Marcha de las Libertades" (March of the Bicentennial, March of Liberties) and extended from the Angel of Independence to the Alameda Central. The march in Mexico City was paralleled in 25 other Mexican cities.

Despite its prominence, the existence of a large, open gay community in Zona Rosa still creates controversy. Some, such as the president of the Agrupacion de Comericantes de la Zona Rosa (Acozoro), Mariano Molina, state that the presence of an open gay community drives away visitors and customers who are not accustomed to seeing gay couples in public. Others state that the government will not work to save the area because of the gay bars and Mexico's ethic of machismo.

While male and female prostitution exists in Zona Rosa, there have been complaints of the prostitution of minors in the gay community, despite efforts since the 1990s to eradicate it. Residents and business owners complain that this prostitution is very open and can be very aggressive, centered on the various gay bars that can be found on and around Ambares Street. However, business owners in the gay community state that the prostitution issue, including that of minors, is not the problem that neighbors say it is; rather it is that some have a problem with having an open gay community. These businesses state that gays have a high level of purchasing power and many own their own businesses that employ thousands in the city. They also state that the gay community attracts visitors from other parts of the city and even internationally. This is particularly true on Gay Pride Day, when the city holds a parade on Paseo de la Reforma and at Christmastime.

=== Korean community ===
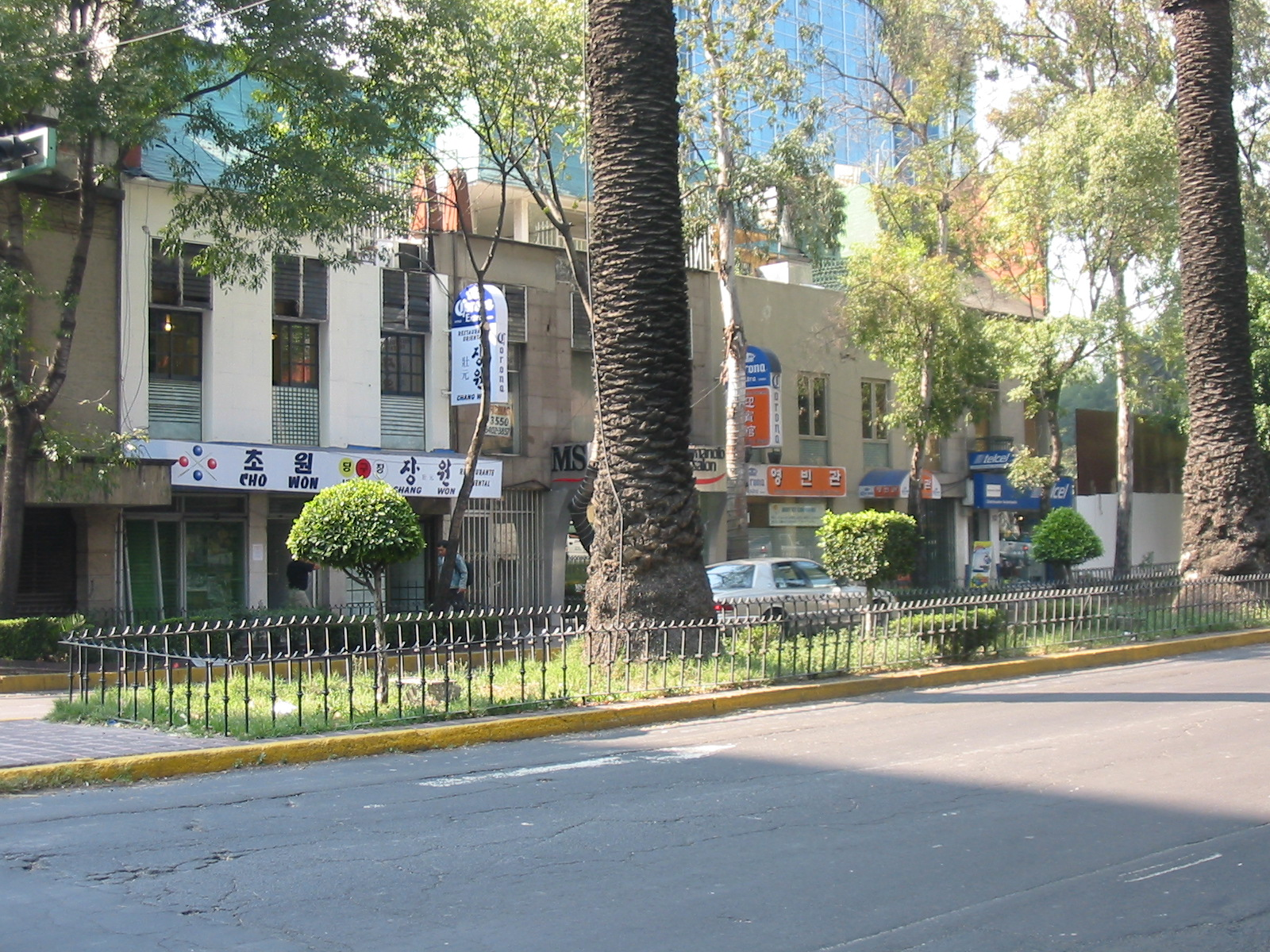
Korean businesses on Florencia Street

Most of Mexico City's Korean population of about 9,000 lives in and around Zona Rosa. According to the newspaper Reforma, there are at least 1,000 Koreans living in Zona Rosa proper and about 3,000 total in Colonia Juárez. In Zona Rosa, especially west of Florencia Street, barber shops, restaurants, and Internet cafes with signs in Korean dot the area.

Many Korean residents do not speak Spanish and are relatively isolated from their Mexican neighbors. The area around Hamburgo, Praga, Berna and Biarritz streets has been converted into “Pequeño Seúl” (Little Seoul), with Biarritz Street's residents almost 90% Korean.

The number of Korean residents in the colonia continues to increase even as the number of younger people in general decreases. Most immigrated to Mexico in the 1990s and the first decade of the 21st century, as a result of commercial agreements signed by the Mexican government with Korea and Taiwan, allowing companies such as Daewoo to bring workers over from Asia. However, according to some sources such as Alfredo Romero, professor of the Faculty of Political and Social Sciences at UNAM, a large percentage of Koreans living in Mexico have questionable immigration status. There have been conflicts between Korean-owned businesses and Mexican neighbors over noise and sanitation issues, with some Mexicans complaining that the Koreans do not want to adapt to Mexican society. Another issue has been legal problems, both with the status of merchandise and the status of employees. A store owned by Koreans was shut down by police for selling imported merchandise of questionable origin in 2002, with 33 workers detained.

== Economy and tourism ==
Most of the business conducted in Zona Rosa is through retail establishments. The area is home to 714 businesses, which include 137 restaurants and 37 parking garages. It is still one of the city's primary entertainment and shopping districts. It contains stores (especially clothing stores), cafes, hotels, chain stores, fast-food places, restaurants, major hotels, airline offices, banks, clubs and more. There is an antiques mall on Londres Street, and a large handicrafts and souvenir market called Mercado Insurgentes between Liverpool and Londres street, where a number of shopkeepers speak English and some take U.S. dollars. Approximately 100,000 people pass through the area each day, and an estimated 12,000,000 pesos is spent here each day.

Another prominent retail segment includes businesses that cater to Mexico City's gay community. Since they were established in the 1990s, these businesses have grown in size and number and include sex shops, bookstores, movie theaters and exclusive hotels, as well as bars and nightclubs. These total over 200 businesses spread over 16 blocks, which is now considered to be the community business center. Most customers in Zona Rosa's businesses are visitors from other parts of the city, foreign tourists, and businessmen who come from nearby office buildings concentrated on or near Paseo de la Reforma. The area that connects Metro Insurgentes with Zona Rosa tends to become crowded with street peddlers selling tamales, perfumes, handicrafts, unlicensed CDs/DVDs and more to passerby groups.

The attractions of the area for tourists, especially foreign ones, are the shopping, the cafes, and the nightclubs. However, these nightclubs, especially the men's clubs, have a reputation for attracting prostitution, underage drinking, illegal gambling, and other crime, which has a detrimental effect on tourism. The general deterioration of the area, both in physical infrastructure, crime, and types of businesses, has been problematic for the area as well. Although the area is still heavily promoted by the city, its secretary of tourism has admitted that it has lost much of its international prestige and can no longer be assured of its status as a tourist attraction.

While there are about 38 bars and 10 men's clubs known to police that report good business, they also create problems for the area. Many are linked to illicit activities such as prostitution, both male and female, which noticeable on the streets after 10 pm seven days a week. Another problem is “tarjeteros”, who crowd the area's streets day and night (especially Genova Street), handing out cards and flyers to passersby advertising bars, clubs and other businesses. While this activity is legal, these tarjeteros have been accused of bothering area visitors and being associated with small-scale drug trafficking.

To counter its decline, the city has worked to rehabilitate the area, linking it with the more popular historic center through the Reforma-Centro Historico tourism corridor in 2005. There have been efforts to improve the area through the 2000s, which are projected to continued at least until 2012. This area was designated as a "Barrio Mágico" by the city in 2011.

Luxury hotels in the area include Maria Isabel Sheraton, Galeria Plaza, Plaza Florencia, Cristal Rosa, Geneve, Marquis, Aristos, Royal and Marco Polo. Despite the area's problems, the 24 hotels in the area report an average occupancy rate of 80%, mostly from foreign tourists, year-round.

== Education ==
The Center for the Teaching of Foreign Languages (CELE) of the National Autonomous University of Mexico (UNAM) has a venue at Milán Street, partially sponsored by Fundación UNAM.
