= Flor Silvestre filmography =

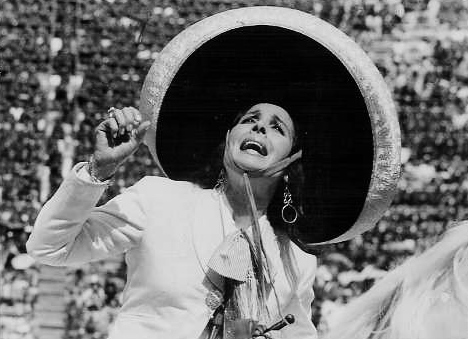
Flor Silvestre in 1974

Mexican singer Flor Silvestre, one of the most iconic performers of Mexican and Hispanic music, is also a prolific and versatile actress of Mexican cinema's "golden age". In her 40-year acting career, she played leading and supporting roles in more than 70 feature films of various genres. She was one of the most sought-after actresses of the late 1950s, and, as a result, 30 of her films were released in only four years (1957–1960). She worked with film directors Zacarías Gómez Urquiza, Vicente Oroná, Miguel M. Delgado, Jaime Salvador, Chano Urueta, Roberto Gavaldón, Gilberto Martínez Solares, Miguel Contreras Torres, Rogelio A. González, Ismael Rodríguez, Gilberto Gazcón, Benito Alazraki, Miguel Zacarías, René Cardona, and Mario Hernández.

== Filmography ==
Year	Title	Role	Notes
1950	Te besaré en la boca	Singer	Special appearance
1950	Primero soy mexicano	Lupe	Acting debut
1951	The Masked Tiger	Rosita	
1952	The Lone Wolf	Lupita Gutiérrez	
1952	The Justice of the Wolf	Lupita Gutiérrez	
1952	The Wolf Returns	Lupita Gutiérrez	
1956	La doncella de piedra	Cantaralia Barroso	
1956	La huella del chacal	Amapola	
1956	Rapto al sol	Liliana	
1957	La virtud desnuda	Singer	Special appearance
1957	El bolero de Raquel	Leonor	
1957	El jinete sin cabeza	Margarita	
1957	La justicia del gavilán vengador	Azucena	
1957	La marca de Satanás	Margarita	
1957	La cabeza de Pancho Villa	Margarita	
1958	Fiesta en el corazón	Florecita	Special appearance
1958	El rayo de Sinaloa	Bernardina	
1958	La rebelión de la sierra	Bernardina	
1958	Los muertos no hablan	Alondra	
1958	¡Paso a la juventud..!	Jovita	Special appearance
1959	Quietos todos	Chabela	
1959	Mi mujer necesita marido	Hortencia	
1959	Kermesse	Blanca	
1959	Tan bueno el giro como el colorado	Carmen Aguilar	
1959	Pueblo en armas	Lolita Vargas	
1959	El hombre del alazán	Reina	
1959	El ciclón	Lupe Ayala	
1959	La cucaracha	Lola	
1959	Escuela de verano	Yolanda Jiménez	
1960	El gran pillo	María	
1960	Dos locos en escena	Cristal	
1960	Las hermanas Karambazo	Otilia Karambazo	
1960	Poker de reinas	Paloma	
1960	Las tres coquetonas	Luisa	
1960	Vivo o muerto	María	
1960	De tal palo tal astilla	Elena	
1960	Los fanfarrones	Flor Mendoza	
1960	¡Viva la soldadera!	Lolita Vargas	
1960	Venganza fatal	Reina	
1961	Juan sin miedo	Isabel Zertuche	
1962	Ánimas Trujano	Catalina	
1962	La venganza de la sombra	Anita	
1962	La trampa mortal	Rosita	
1963	Aquí está tu enamorado	Flor	
1964	Tres muchachas de Jalisco	Flor	
1964	El revólver sangriento	Rosa	
1965	Escuela para solteras	Elisa / Felisa	
1965	El rifle implacable	Luisa Vélez	
1965	Alma llanera	Lucía	
1966	El tragabalas	Lola	
1966	El alazán y el rosillo	Maura Torres	
1966	Juan Colorado	Singer	Special appearance
1968	Caballo prieto azabache	Genoveva Larios	
1968	El as de oros	Rosario	
1969	Lauro Puñales	Rosenda Rodríguez	
1969	El ojo de vidrio	María "La Coralillo"	
1970	Vuelve el ojo de vidrio	María "La Coralillo"	
1971	Los marcados	Mercedes	
1973	Valente Quintero	Rafaela	Special appearance
1973	La yegua colorada	Rocío Villegas	
1974	La muerte de Pancho Villa	Soledad	
1974	Peregrina	Isabel Palma	
1975	Simón Blanco	Singer	Special appearance
1975	Don Herculano enamorado	Gabriela	
1977	El moro de Cumpas	Dolores	
1977	Mi aventura en Puerto Rico	Herself	
1978	Los triunfadores	Herself	Special appearance
1979	Benjamín Argumedo, el rebelde	Delfina	
1979	Mi caballo el cantador	Guillermina	
1980	Albur de amor	Singer	Special appearance
1980	Sabor a sangre	Señora Arteaga	
1980	Persecución y muerte de Benjamín Argumedo	Delfina	
1991	Triste recuerdo	Susana Guzmán	Filmed in 1990
