= 15 éxitos, vol. 2 (Flor Silvestre album) =

Greatest hits album by Flor Silvestre
- Released: 1989 (original LP release); 1998 (CD reissue)
- Recorded: 1959–1972
- Genre: Ranchera; bolero
- Length: 44:00
- Label: Musart

15 éxitos, vol. 2 is a greatest hits album by Mexican singer Flor Silvestre, released in 1989 by Musart Records. It includes fifteen of Flor Silvestre's hits from the late 1950s to the late 1960s. Originally released as an LP record, it has been reissued several times on compact cassette, CD, and digital download.

== 1989 LP track listing ==
Side one

No.	Title	Writer(s)	Accompaniment	Length
1.	"Mi destino fue quererte"	Felipe Valdés Leal	Benjamín Correa (guitar), harmonica	3:30
2.	"Desolación"	Manuel S. Acuña	Mariachi México de Pepe Villa	3:02
3.	"Para morir iguales"	José Alfredo Jiménez	Mariachi México de Pepe Villa	2:51
4.	"Caricia y herida"	Chucho Monge		2:14
5.	"Qué bonito amor"	José Alfredo Jiménez	Mariachi México de Pepe Villa	2:35
6.	"Lágrimas del alma"	Bony Villaseñor	Mariachi México de Pepe Villa	2:36
7.	"Miel amarga"	Cuco Sánchez	Mariachi México de Pepe Villa	2:37
8.	"No vuelvo a amar"	I. Barraza	Antonio Bribiesca (guitar)	2:48

Side two

No.	Title	Writer(s)	Accompaniment	Length
1.	"Toda una vida"	Osvaldo Farrés	Benjamín Correa (guitar)	2:48
2.	"Amar y vivir"	Consuelo Velázquez	Benjamín Correa (guitar)	2:48
3.	"Cachito de mi vida"	Pepe Albarrán	Mariachi Los Mensajeros	3:12
4.	"Gracias"	Augusto Algueró (music); Antonio Guijarro (lyrics)	Mariachi México de Pepe Villa	3:05
5.	"Aquel amor"	Agustín Lara	Benjamín Correa (guitar), harp	3:27
6.	"Cariño santo"	Cuco Sánchez	Benjamín Correa (guitar), harmonica	3:46
7.	"Perdámonos"	Mario de Jesús	Mariachi México de Pepe Villa	2:55
