= 15 éxitos (Flor Silvestre album) =

- 1989 CD reissue cover

Greatest hits album by Flor Silvestre
- Released: 1984 (original LP release); 1989 (first CD reissue); 3 February 2015 (Sony Music reissue)
- Recorded: 1958–1976
- Genre: Ranchera, bolero
- Length: 43:51
- Label: Musart; Sony Music Latin (2015 reissue)

15 éxitos (English: 15 Hits) is a greatest hits album by Mexican singer Flor Silvestre, released in 1984 by Musart Records. The 1989 CD reissue and most recent releases of this compilation include "Mi destino fue quererte" as the first track.

== 1984 LP track listing ==
Side one

| No. | Title | Writer(s) | Accompaniment | Length |
|---|---|---|---|---|
| 1. | "Cielo rojo" | Juan Záizar | Mariachi México de Pepe Villa | 3:39 |
| 2. | "Renunciación" | Antonio Valdés Herrera | Mariachi México de Pepe Villa | 2:35 |
| 3. | "El peor de los caminos" | José Alfredo Jiménez | Mariachi México de Pepe Villa | 2:53 |
| 4. | "Amémonos" | Manuel María Flores (lyrics); Carlos Montbrun Ocampo (music) | Mariachi Zapopan | 2:35 |
| 5. | "Celosa" | Pablo Rodríguez | Mariachi México de Pepe Villa | 3:02 |
| 6. | "Viejo nopal" | Cuates Castilla | Benjamín Correa (guitar), harmonica | 3:34 |
| 7. | "Aquel inmenso amor" | Roberto Cantoral | Mariachi México de Pepe Villa | 2:42 |

Side two

| No. | Title | Writer(s) | Accompaniment | Length |
|---|---|---|---|---|
| 1. | "Pa' todo el año" | José Alfredo Jiménez | Mariachi México de Pepe Villa | 3:08 |
| 2. | "El mar y la esperanza" | Alfonso Villagómez | Mariachi México de Pepe Villa | 2:11 |
| 3. | "La basurita" | Juan Záizar | Mariachi Oro y Plata de José Chávez | 2:30 |
| 4. | "Gaviota traidora" | Margarito Estrada | Mariachi México de Pepe Villa | 2:43 |
| 5. | "Mi casita de paja" | Víctor Cordero | Benjamín Correa (guitar), harp | 3:19 |
| 6. | "Las noches las hago días" | Rafael Rosales | Trio and rhythms | 2:42 |
| 7. | "Cruz de olvido" (feat. Antonio Aguilar) | Juan Záizar | Mariachi Oro y Plata de José Chávez | 2:55 |
| 8. | "Una limosna" | Indalecio Ramírez | Mariachi Los Mensajeros | 2:24 |

== 1989 CD track listing ==
| No. | Title | Writer(s) | Length |
|---|---|---|---|
| 1. | "Mi destino fue quererte" | Felipe Valdés Leal | 3:30 |
| 2. | "Cielo rojo" | Juan Záizar | 3:39 |
| 3. | "Renunciación" | Antonio Valdés Herrera | 2:35 |
| 4. | "El peor de los caminos" | José Alfredo Jiménez | 2:53 |
| 5. | "Amémonos" | Manuel María Flores (lyrics); Carlos Montbrun Ocampo (music) | 2:35 |
| 6. | "Celosa" | Pablo Rodríguez | 3:02 |
| 7. | "Viejo nopal" | Cuates Castilla | 3:34 |
| 8. | "Aquel inmenso amor" | Roberto Cantoral | 2:42 |
| 9. | "Pa' todo el año" | José Alfredo Jiménez | 3:08 |
| 10. | "El mar y la esperanza" | Alfonso Villagómez | 2:11 |
| 11. | "La basurita" | Juan Záizar | 2:30 |
| 12. | "Gaviota traidora" | Margarito Estrada | 2:43 |
| 13. | "Mi casita de paja" | Víctor Cordero | 3:19 |
| 14. | "Las noches las hago días" | Rafael Rosales | 2:42 |
| 15. | "Cruz de olvido" (feat. Antonio Aguilar) | Juan Záizar | 2:55 |
| Total length: | | | 43:51 |
