= El disco de oro de Flor Silvestre =

Greatest hits album by Flor Silvestre
- Released: 1977
- Recorded: 1961–1975
- Genre: Ranchera; bolero
- Label: Musart

El disco de oro de Flor Silvestre (Flor Silvestre's Gold Record) is a greatest hits album by Mexican singer Flor Silvestre, released in 1977 by Musart Records.

== Track listing ==
Side one

No.	Title	Writer(s)	Accompaniment	Length
1.	"Cielo rojo"	Juan Záizar	Mariachi México de Pepe Villa	3:39
2.	"Caricia y herida"	Chucho Monge	Conjunto	2:14
3.	"Sólo con las estrellas"	Juan Vicente Torrealba	Mariachi Oro y Plata de José Chávez	2:45
4.	"Cuatro vidas"	Justo Carrera	Mariachi Oro y Plata de José Chávez	2:20
5.	"Pesares"	José Barros	Mariachi México de Pepe Villa	2:20

Side two

No.	Title	Writer(s)	Accompaniment	Length
1.	"Mi destino fue quererte"	Felipe Valdés Leal	Benjamín Correa, harmonica	3:30
2.	"Cachito de mi vida"	Pepe Albarrán	Mariachi Los Mensajeros	3:12
3.	"Estrellita marinera"	Alfonso Esparza Oteo	Mariachi Oro y Plata de José Chávez	2:26
4.	"Con mis propias manos"	Antonio Valdés Herrera	Mariachi Oro y Plata de José Chávez	2:43
5.	"Renunciación"	Antonio Valdés Herrera	Mariachi México de Pepe Villa	2:35
