= Canciones con alma =

Studio album by Flor Silvestre
- Released: 1972
- Genre: Bolero
- Label: Musart

Flor Silvestre chronology
La voz que acaricia (1972)	Canciones con alma (1972)	La onda norteña de Flor Silvestre (1973)

Canciones con alma (Songs with Soul) is a studio album by Mexican singer Flor Silvestre, released in 1972 by Musart Records. It is Flor Silvestre's second bolero album.

== Critical reception ==
Billboard included the album in its Top Album Picks section and gave it a positive review: "A good solid LP overall of love ballads. Best cuts: 'Vuelve,' 'Tormento,' 'Quisiera.'"

== Track listing ==
Side one

No.	Title	Writer(s)	Length
1.	"Vuelve"	Hnos. Martínez Gil	2:45
2.	"Somos diferentes"	Pablo Beltrán Ruiz	2:12
3.	"Contraste"	Agustín Lara	2:13
4.	"La hiedra"	D'Aquisto; Seracini	2:10
5.	"¿A qué negar?"	Guty Cárdenas	2:18
6.	"Tormento"	Abel Domínguez	2:48

Side two

No.	Title	Writer(s)	Length
1.	"Desvelo de amor"	Rafael Hernández	2:25
2.	"Presentimiento"	Emilio Pacheco	2:22
3.	"Para olvidarte"	Cárdenas; Padrón	2:33
4.	"Quisiera"	Guty Cárdenas	2:37
5.	"Caricia y herida"	Chucho Monge	2:14
6.	"Sé muy bien que vendrás"	Antonio Núñez	2:14

== Personnel ==
- Salomón Jiménez – arranger
- Gustavo A. Santiago – director
