= La sentimental Flor Silvestre =

Studio album by Flor Silvestre
- Released: 1964
- Genre: Ranchera; bolero
- Label: Musart

Flor Silvestre chronology
| Flor Silvestre con el Mariachi México, vol. 2 (1964) | La sentimental Flor Silvestre (1964) | La acariciante voz de Flor Silvestre (1965) |

Singles from La sentimental Flor Silvestre
- 1. "Mi destino fue quererte" Released: 1964; 2. "Mi casita de paja" Released: 1964

La sentimental Flor Silvestre is a studio album by Mexican singer Flor Silvestre, released in 1964 by Musart Records. It features both ranchera and bolero songs, all of which became hits. The album's guitarist is Benjamín Correa.

== Track listing ==
Side one

| No. | Title | Writer(s) | Length |
|---|---|---|---|
| 1. | "Aquel amor" | Agustín Lara | 3:29 |
| 2. | "Cariño santo" | Cuco Sánchez | 3:49 |
| 3. | "El tren sin pasajeros" | Tomás Méndez | 2:19 |
| 4. | "Mi destino fue quererte" | Felipe Valdés Leal | 3:30 |
| 5. | "Viejo nopal" | Cuates Castilla | 3:33 |
| 6. | "Mi casita de paja" | Víctor Cordero | 3:22 |

Side two

| No. | Title | Writer(s) | Length |
|---|---|---|---|
| 1. | "Pensando en ti" | Alfonso Torres | 3:03 |
| 2. | "Toda una vida" | Osvaldo Farrés | 2:50 |
| 3. | "Falsa" | Juan B. Leonardo | 2:43 |
| 4. | "Amar y vivir" | Consuelo Velázquez | 2:48 |
| 5. | "Mi pensamiento" | Alfredo Núñez de Borbón | 2:49 |
| 6. | "Ya no te quiero" | Rafael Hernández | 3:24 |

== Chart ==
| Chart (1966) | Peak position |
|---|---|
| Record World Latin American LP Hit Parade | 9 |
