= Flor Silvestre, vol. 6 =

Studio album by Flor Silvestre
- Released: 1967
- Genre: Ranchera; bolero
- Label: Musart

Flor Silvestre chronology
Boleros rancheros con la acariciante voz de Flor Silvestre (1967)	Flor Silvestre, vol. 6 (1967)	Flor Silvestre, vol. 7 (1968)

Singles from Flor Silvestre, vol. 6
- 1. "Traicionera" Released: 1967; 2. "Perdámonos" Released: 1967; 3. "La cruz negra" Released: 1967; 4. "Cansancio" Released: 1967; 5. "Una noche más sin ti" Released: 1967

Flor Silvestre, vol. 6 is a studio album by Mexican singer Flor Silvestre, released in 1967 by Musart Records.

== Track listing ==
Side one

No.	Title	Writer(s)	Length
1.	"Perdámonos"	Mario de Jesús	2:59
2.	"Infierno" (with the Mariachi México of Pepe Villa)	Mario de Jesús	2:46
3.	"Traicionera" (with the Mariachi México of Pepe Villa)	Jaime R. Echeverría	2:15
4.	"Una noche más sin ti"	Laura Herrera de Marchett	2:30
5.	"De la gloria al olvido" (with the Mariachi México of Pepe Villa)	Mario de Jesús	2:39
6.	"Cansancio"	Antonio Valdés Herrera	2:14

Side two

No.	Title	Writer(s)	Length
1.	"La cruz negra"	Ángela Ríos Valenzuela	2:50
2.	"Yo que no vivo sin ti" (with the Mariachi México of Pepe Villa)	Pino Donaggio; Vito Pallavicini	2:05
3.	"Alitas rotas"	Rogelio González	2:38
4.	"Amor callado" (with the Mariachi México of Pepe Villa)	Jorge Ortega; Víctor Manuel Mato	2:35
5.	"Mi golondrina"	Irene Pintor	2:50
6.	"El patito feo" (with the Mariachi México of Pepe Villa)	Cuco Sánchez	2:46
