= Flor Silvestre y las canciones de sus tríos favoritos =

Studio album by Flor Silvestre
- Released: 1970
- Genre: Bolero
- Label: Musart

Flor Silvestre chronology
Amor, siempre amor (1970)	Flor Silvestre y las canciones de sus tríos favoritos (1970)	Las noches las hago días (1971)

Flor Silvestre y las canciones de sus tríos favoritos (Flor Silvestre and Her/Your Favorite Trio Songs) is a studio album by Mexican singer Flor Silvestre, released in 1970 by Musart Records. It features Flor Silvestre's versions of twelve boleros that were popularized by Mexican trios in the 1950s.

== Critical reception ==
Cashbox included the album in its Latin Picks section, praising it as a "masterpiece for lovers of Latin boleros". It lauded Flor Silvestre's soulful, sentimental singing style: "Multi-talented vocalist Flor Silvestre gives her heart and soul on this album of love songs. Most of the songs are old Latin standards. This LP was recorded in Mexico and the songs are beautifully suited to her style of singing". The review also noticed that Flor Silvestre "is backed by a fantastic trio with beautiful background vocals behind her", but warned that the "trio is not mentioned in the album liner notes".

== Track listing ==
Side one

No.	Title	Writer(s)	Length
1.	"Un siglo de ausencia"	Alfredo Gil	2:56
2.	"El reloj"	Roberto Cantoral	2:59
3.	"Sin ti"	Pepe Guízar	2:23
4.	"Mar y cielo"	Julio Rodríguez Reyes	2:30
5.	"Historia de un amor"	Carlos E. Almarán	2:28
6.	"Venganza"	Lupicinio Rodríguez	3:11

Side two

No.	Title	Writer(s)	Length
1.	"Condición"	Gabriel Ruiz; Gabriel Luna de la Fuente	2:31
2.	"La barca"	Roberto Cantoral	3:08
3.	"Amor mío"	Álvaro Carrillo	2:20
4.	"Contigo"	Claudio Estrada	2:28
5.	"Sabrá Dios"	Álvaro Carrillo	2:20
6.	"Luna de octubre"	José Antonio Michel	2:37

== Release history ==
Title	Label	Format	Catalog
Y las canciones de sus tríos favoritos	Musart	LP record	EDM-1511
Sus canciones favoritas con... Flor Silvestre	Oasis (Musart)	LP record	OA-321
Boleros	Musart Premier	Compact Cassette	CMP-735
Mis boleros favoritos	Globo Musart	Compact disc	CDG-2761
