= Antonio Bribiesca =

Antonio Bribiesca (January 23, 1905 - January 9, 1980) was a Mexican song composer and guitarist, performing in the mariachi and ranchera genres. He is noted for his recordings playing guitar in a supporting role for Chavela Vargas.

== Early life ==
He was born to Antonio Bribiesca Toledo and María Luisa Castellanos. Bribiesca had lessons in music from an early age, and wrote his first melodies at age nine. His education did not progress beyond high school and he joined the Bohemian music scene in Mexico.

== Professional life ==
He appeared in several Mexican films – several from 1950 to 1963, mainly as guitar player. Among the few credited references is his participation in the film Ahí viene Martín Corona in which he accompanied Pedro Infante on guitar singing "Paloma Querida". He also participated in television, in a program sponsored by the La Central matchsticks called "Guitarras".

Among his best-known works is “Dos de abril,” as for several years he played this piece to open the XEW radio station programming.[1] He accompanied Flor Silvestre on the album Flor Silvestre, vol. 8 with the guitar and arrangements of Antonio Bribiesca (1968) and Irma Serrano on the album Irma Serrano with the romantic guitar of Antonio Bribiesca (1973).

== Recognition and influence ==
Bribiesca has influenced musicians such as Miguel Peña and Juan Carlos Allende (better known as Los Macorinos, exemplary guitar accompaniments of Chavela Vargas and more recently of Natalia Lafourcade), who claim that his music is not only a continuation of Bribiesca's style, but that it was he who forged the nostalgic character of Cuco Sánchez's music.

== Recordings ==
He recorded as a lead artist for Columbia, Orfeón and Peerless. He also appeared as a sideman for Cuco Sanchez, Chavela Vargas, Silvestre Vargas, David Zaizar, among others.

== Selected filmography ==
- Ahí viene Martín Corona (1952)
- Nacida para amar (1959) -guitar solo
- El hombre del alazán (1959) -guitar performance
- Las cuatro mil pas (1960)
- Guitarras lloren guitarras (1963) -composer
