= Boleros rancheros con la acariciante voz de Flor Silvestre =

Studio album by Flor Silvestre
- Released: 1967
- Genre: Bolero; ranchera
- Label: Musart

Flor Silvestre chronology
Celosa con Flor Silvestre y otros éxitos (1966)	Boleros rancheros con la acariciante voz de Flor Silvestre (1967)	Flor Silvestre, vol. 6 (1967)

Singles from Boleros rancheros con la acariciante voz de Flor Silvestre
- 1. "El despertar" Released: 1966; 2. "Hambre" Released: 1966; 3. "Me tienes en el olvido" Released: 1967; 4. "Amor y traición" Released: 1967

Boleros rancheros con la acariciante voz de Flor Silvestre is a studio album by Mexican singer Flor Silvestre, released in 1967 by Musart Records.

== Critical reception ==
Music critic Tomás Fundora, in his Record World column, commended the album: "Flor Silvestre's [most recent] recording for Musart is very good, containing 'El Despertar', 'Hambre', 'Aunque me Hagas Llorar', 'Pídele a Dios', and '¿Quién es?', among others".

== Track listing ==
Side one

1. "El despertar"
2. "Miel amarga"
3. "La enramada"
4. "Hambre"
5. "Me tienes en el olvido"
6. "Aunque me hagas llorar"

Side two

1. "Corazón salvaje"
2. "Noche callada"
3. "Amor y traición
4. "Una imploración"
5. "Pídele a Dios"
6. "¿Quién es?"

== Personnel ==
- Mariachi México – accompaniment
