= The League of Songs =

1941 film

- Directed by: Chano Urueta
- Written by: Ernesto Cortázar; Jorge Reyes; Domingo Soler; Chano Urueta
- Produced by: Emilio Azcárraga; Mauricio de la Serna; Alfonso Sánchez Tello
- Starring: Ramón Armengod; Mapy Cortés; Domingo Soler
- Cinematography: Agustín Martínez Solares
- Music by: Manuel Esperón
- Production company: America Films
- Release date: 13 September 1941
- Running time: 105 minutes
- Country: Mexico
- Language: Spanish

The League of Songs (Spanish: La liga de las canciones) is a 1941 Mexican musical comedy film directed by Chano Urueta and starring Ramón Armengod, Mapy Cortés and Domingo Soler, with the musical participation of La Panchita. It was shot at the Azteca Studios in Mexico City. The film's sets were designed by the art director José Rodríguez Granada. It was part of the tradition of Ranchera films, popular during the Golden Age of Mexican Cinema.

== Cast ==
- Ramón Armengod as Ramón Rios
- Mapy Cortés as Mapy
- Domingo Soler as Don Asdrubal Santacana
- Fernando Cortés as René Mares
- Jorge Reyes as Alberto Arroyo
- Clifford Carr as Mr. Johnson
- Fanny Schiller as Doña Gertrudis
- María Elena Galindo as Margarita
- Paco Miller as Ventrílocuo
- Marina Herrera as Marilú
- La Panchita as Cantante
- Abel Salazar as Presidente conferencia
- Eduardo Noriega as Asistente de Johnson
- Roberto Cañedo as Huesped hotel
- Blanca Estela Pavón as Bailarina

== Bibliography ==
- Avila, Jaqueline. Cinesonidos: Film Music and National Identity During Mexico's Época de Oro. Oxford University Press, 2019.
- Riera, Emilio García. Historia documental del cine mexicano: 1941. Ediciones Era, 1969.
