= Celosa con Flor Silvestre y otros éxitos =

Studio album by Flor Silvestre
- Released: 1966
- Genre: Ranchera
- Label: Musart

Flor Silvestre chronology
La acariciante voz de Flor Silvestre (1965)	Celosa con Flor Silvestre y otros éxitos (1966)	Boleros rancheros con la acariciante voz de Flor Silvestre (1967)

Singles from Celosa con Flor Silvestre y otros éxitos
- 1. "La señal de la cruz" Released: 1964; 2. "Celosa" Released: 1966; 3. "Canción desesperada" Released: 1966; 4. "Por qué, Dios mío" Released: 1967

Celosa con Flor Silvestre y otros éxitos (Celosa with Flor Silvestre and Other Hits) is a studio album by Mexican singer Flor Silvestre, released in 1966 by Musart Records.

== Track listing ==
Side one

No.	Title	Writer(s)	Length
1.	"Celosa"	Pablo Rodríguez
2.	"Sinceridad"	Gastón Pérez
3.	"Llorando por amor"	Jorge Villamil
4.	"La noche de mi amor"	Dolores Durán
5.	"¿Por qué, Dios mío?" (feat. Mariachi Los Mensajeros)	Matías Peña Flores
6.	"Luna y lejanía"	Juan Vicente Torrealba

Side two

No.	Title	Writer(s)	Length
1.	"Cachito de mi vida" (feat. Mariachi Los Mensajeros)	Pepe Albarrán
2.	"Te necesito"	Luis Demetrio
3.	"La señal de la cruz"	M. Vigo
4.	"Río crecido"	R. Fuentes; R. Méndez
5.	"Vámonos" (feat. Mariachi Los Mensajeros)	José Alfredo Jiménez
6.	"Canción desesperada"	Enrique Discépolo

== Charts ==
Chart (1966)	Peak position
Record World Latin American LP Hit Parade	11
