= Adoro a mi tierra =

Song written by Artemio Santoyo

"Adoro a mi tierra" ("I Adore My Land") is a song written by Artemio Santoyo at the request of singer Flor Silvestre, who wanted to pay tribute to her hometown, Salamanca, Guanajuato, Mexico. She recorded the song in 1950 for Columbia Records, accompanied by Rubén Fuentes' mariachi. It became one of her first hits. Okeh Records, Columbia's subsidiary label, reissued the recording in the compilation album Flor Silvestre canta sus éxitos (1964), and Sony Music reissued it in digital format in 2016.
