= Amor, siempre amor =

Studio album by Flor Silvestre
- Released: 1970
- Genre: Ranchera
- Label: Musart

Flor Silvestre chronology
Flor Silvestre, vol. 8 (1968)	Amor, siempre amor (1970)	Flor Silvestre y las canciones de sus tríos favoritos (1970)

Singles from Amor, siempre amor
- 1. "Sin rebeldías" Released: 1970; 2. "Como un remolino" Released: 1970

Amor, siempre amor (English: Love, Always Love) is a studio album by Mexican singer Flor Silvestre, released in 1970 by Musart Records.

== Critical reception ==
Record World gave the album a rave review and described it in two words: "Superb repertoire!" It also wrote that "Flor Silvestre is one of the best 'ranchera' singers in Mexico and is selling big in California, Colorado, Arizona, Mexico, New York and Texas".

== Track listing ==
Side one

1. "La cruz de lo imposible" (Guadalupe Ramos) – 2:09
2. "La mitad de mi orgullo" (José Alfredo Jiménez) – 2:58
3. "Cantares de amor" (Sebastián Curiel) – 2:32
4. "Paredes viejas" (Antonio Valdés Herrera) – 2:37
5. "Necesito un corazón" (Felipe "Indio" Jiménez, Guillermo Acosta) – 2:31
6. "Tu amargura" (Laureano Martínez Smart) – 2:28

Side two

1. "Como un remolino" (Rubén Méndez del Castillo) – 3:04
2. "Aprendí a llorar" (Ángel Cabral, Carlos Medina) – 2:21
3. "Dos corazones" (arranged by Rubén Méndez del Castillo) – 2:45
4. "Tanto amor que abandoné" (Rubén Méndez del Castillo) – 2:21
5. "Tus acacias" (Indalecio Ramírez) – 1:55
6. "Adiós al fin" (Rubén Méndez del Castillo) – 2:39

== Personnel ==
- Mariachi Guadalajara – accompaniment
