= La acariciante voz de Flor Silvestre =

Studio album by Flor Silvestre
- Released: 1965
- Genre: Ranchera; bolero; pasillo
- Label: Musart

Flor Silvestre chronology
La sentimental Flor Silvestre (1964)	La acariciante voz de Flor Silvestre (1965)	Celosa con Flor Silvestre y otros éxitos (1966)

Singles from La acariciante voz de Flor Silvestre
- 1. "Gaviota traidora" Released: 1964; 2. "Probé el dolor" Released: 1964; 3. "Una limosna" Released: 1965; 4. "Espumas" Released: 1966

La acariciante voz de Flor Silvestre (English: The Caressive Voice) is a studio album by Mexican singer Flor Silvestre, released in 1965 by Musart Records.

== Track listing ==
Side one

No.	Title	Writer(s)	Accompaniment	Length
1.	"Gaviota traidora"	Margarito Estrada	Mariachi México
2.	"Amor se escribe con llanto"	Álvaro Dalmar	Trío Los Albinos
3.	"Volver a verte"	Algueró; Antonio Guijarro	Mariachi Internacional
4.	"La puerta blanca"	Indalecio Ramírez	Mariachi México
5.	"Vengo a saber"	A. M. Brambila	Mariachi México
6.	"Para adorarte"	Fidel A. Vista	Mariachi Internacional

Side two

No.	Title	Writer(s)	Accompaniment	Length
1.	"Una limosna"	Indalecio Ramírez	Mariachi Los Mensajeros
2.	"El mar y la esperanza"	Alfonso Villagómez	Mariachi México
3.	"Espumas"	Jorge Villamil	Trío Los Albinos
4.	"Mi última canción"	Rubén Fuentes; Stringolo	Mariachi México
5.	"Y quedarme sin mi"	José Rubén Márquez	Mariachi México
6.	"Probé el dolor"	Avellaneda; Moncada	Mariachi Internacional

== Personnel ==
- Mariachi México – accompaniment
- Mariachi Internacional – accompaniment
- Mariachi Los Mensajeros – accompaniment
- Trío Los Albinos – accompaniment
