= Flor Silvestre, vol. 8 =

Studio album by Flor Silvestre
- Released: 1968
- Genre: Ranchera
- Label: Musart

Flor Silvestre chronology
Flor Silvestre, vol. 7 (1968)	Flor Silvestre, vol. 8 (1968)	Amor, siempre amor (1970)

Singles from Flor Silvestre, vol. 8
- 1. "Ojos negros nunca engañan" Released: 1968; 2. "No vuelvo a amar" Released: 1968

Flor Silvestre, vol. 8 is a studio album by Mexican singer Flor Silvestre, released in 1968 by Musart Records.

== Track listing ==
Side one

No.	Title	Writer(s)	Length
1.	"Los náufragos"	N. Barraza	2:26
2.	"Sin cadenas"	María de la Paz	1:58
3.	"Aunque pasen los años"	Alarcón Leal	2:46
4.	"Ojos negros nunca engañan"	Ramiro Cavazos	2:51
5.	"No vuelvo a amar"	I. Barraza	2:48
6.	"El último mensaje"	Benjamín Sánchez Mota	2:19

Side two

No.	Title	Writer(s)	Length
1.	"Mi amigo el viento"	Emilio Jiménez	2:30
2.	"Pobre de mi corazón"	Margarito Estrada	1:55
3.	"Tú, sólo tú"	Felipe Valdés Leal	3:52
4.	"No es tan fácil"	Antonio Valdés Herrera	2:21
5.	"Dolencias"	Antonio Valdés Herrera	2:28
6.	"Golondrina"	Salvador Velázquez	3:03

== Personnel ==
- Antonio Bribiesca – guitarist, arranger
- Gustavo A. Santiago – arranger
