= Flor Silvestre, vol. 7 =

Studio album by Flor Silvestre
- Released: 1968
- Label: Musart

Flor Silvestre chronology
Flor Silvestre, vol. 6 (1967)	Flor Silvestre, vol. 7 (1968)	Flor Silvestre, vol. 8 (1968)

Singles from Flor Silvestre, vol. 7
- 1. "Cariño malo" Released: 1968; 2. "Reconciliación" Released: 1968; 3. "Mi nombre" Released: 1968

Flor Silvestre, vol. 7 is a studio album by Mexican singer Flor Silvestre, released in 1968 by Musart Records. It features the Mariachi México and the Mariachi Los Mensajeros.

== Track listing ==
Side one

No.	Title	Writer(s)	Length
1.	"Reconciliación"	Acrelio Carrillo C.	2:34
2.	"Cenizas de amor"	José M. Class	2:06
3.	"Ódiame"	Rafael Otero	2:38
4.	"Mátame de amor (Cristina)"	Roberto Cantoral	2:48
5.	"Y te sigo queriendo todavía"	Rosendo Montiel	2:52
6.	"Mi nombre"	Felipe "Indio" Jiménez	2:17

Side two

No.	Title	Writer(s)	Length
1.	"Cariño malo"	Augusto Polo Campos	2:57
2.	"Triunfamos"	Rafael Cárdenas; F. Baena	2:10
3.	"Tres días"	Tomás Méndez	2:50
4.	"Mil perdones"	Felipe "Indio" Jiménez; G. Acosta	2:10
5.	"Yo te pido"	Luis Demetrio	2:56
6.	"Reminiscencias"	L. Aguirre Pintado	2:29

== Personnel ==
- Mariachi México – accompaniment
- Mariachi Los Mensajeros – accompaniment
