= Flor Silvestre canta sus éxitos =

Greatest hits album by Flor Silvestre
- Released: 1964
- Recorded: 1950 (original recordings)
- Genre: Ranchera; son tapatío
- Label: Okeh

Flor Silvestre canta sus éxitos (Flor Silvestre Sings Her Hits) is a greatest hits album by Mexican singer Flor Silvestre, released in 1964 by Okeh Records. It features ten successful songs that the singer recorded for Columbia Records in 1950. It was reissued in 2016 by Sony Music.

== Track listing ==
Side one

No.	Title	Writer(s)	Length
1.	"Con un polvo y otro polvo" (with the Mariachi of Rubén Fuentes)	Rubén Fuentes; Rubén Méndez	3:09
2.	"Imposible olvidarte" (with the Mariachi of Gilberto Parra)	Alberto M. Brambila	2:53
3.	"La presentida" (with the Mariachi of Rubén Fuentes)	Capitán Chinaco	3:13
4.	"Adoro a mi tierra" (with the Mariachi of Rubén Fuentes)	Artemio Santoyo	3:02
5.	"Guadalajara" (with the Mariachi of Gilberto Parra)	Pepe Guízar	2:37

Side two

No.	Title	Writer(s)	Length
1.	"Siempre el amor" (with the Mariachi of Rubén Fuentes)	Ramón Salas	3:00
2.	"Oye morena" (with the Mariachi of Rubén Fuentes)	Emilio Lara Brobb	2:46
3.	"Llorar amargo" (with the Mariachi of Rubén Fuentes)	Capitán Chinaco	3:06
4.	"Viejo nopal" (with the Mariachi of Gilberto Parra)	Cuates Castilla	3:11
5.	"Que Dios te perdone (Dolor de ausencia)" (with the Mariachi of Gilberto Parra)	Gilberto Parra	2:29

== Release history ==
Date	Label	Format	Catalog
1964	Okeh (Columbia/CBS subsidiary)	LP record	OKL-10016
1 September 2016	Sony Music Entertainment México	Music download	—N/a
