= La Llanera Vengadora =

Publication information
- Publisher: Ediciones Latinoamericanas

In-story information
- Alter ego: Flor Silvestre
- Species: Human
- Place of origin: Las Cruces, Mexico
- Partnerships: Fausto (brother)
- Abilities: Marksmanship
La Llanera Vengadora
Publication information
- Genre: Masked heroine
- Main character(s): Flor Silvestre
Creative team
- Penciller(s): José Suárez Lozano; Salvador Lavalle

La Llanera Vengadora (The Avenging Plainswoman) is a Mexican comic book series published by Ediciones Latinoamericanas. The main character, Flor Silvestre "La Llanera Vengadora", was based on and portrayed by the Mexican singer and actress Flor Silvestre.
