= Lupe Silva =

- Born: María Guadalupe Silva Cosío
- Died: 2012
- Genres: Bolero
- Occupations: Singer, actress
- Instrument: Vocals
- Labels: Peerless; Musart

María Guadalupe Silva Cosío, known professionally as Lupe Silva, was a Mexican singer and actress. She was the last singer who collaborated with songwriter and pianist Agustín Lara. Her sister, singer Rebeca Silva Cosío, also collaborated with Lara.

== Career ==
She began her career singing at the Café Francés with Los Bribones and Lupita Corazón. She recorded one of her first albums, Mil recuerdos y una voz, for Peerless Records. In the 1960s, Musart Records hired her to record two albums with compositions by Agustín Lara: Evocando "La hora azul" de Lara and Canciones de Lara. For the Musart label she also recorded an album with compositions by Gabriel Ruiz.

== Career as an actress ==
As an actress, she played the role of Eduviges in the film La trenza (1975). In 1992, she sang at the Teatro de la Ciudad in the musical Solamente una vez, which was produced by the National Association of Actors as a tribute to Agustín Lara. In 1993, she sang in Gran gala de la canción romántica, a series of musical shows that she organized at the Teatro Reforma of the Mexican Social Security Institute. The shows also featured famous performers of Mexican bolero songs.

== Death ==
Lupe Silva died in 2012.

== Discography ==
- Mil recuerdos y una voz (Peerless)
- Evocando la hora azul de Lara (Musart)
- Canciones de Lara (Musart)
- Lupe Silva interpreta a Gabriel Ruiz (Musart)
