= Gaviota traidora =

Song by Flor Silvestre

from the album La acariciante voz
- Language: Spanish
- Released: 1965
- Genre: Corrido
- Length: 2:42
- Label: Musart
- Songwriter: Margarito Estrada

"Gaviota traidora" (Traitorous Seagull) is a corrido written by Margarito Estrada and popularized by Mexican singer Flor Silvestre in the mid-1960s. It was featured in the 1969 film El ojo de vidrio.
