= Cielo rojo (song) =

Song by Flor Silvestre
- Language: Spanish
- Released: 1957 (first version); 1961 (second version)
- Genre: Huapango
- Label: RCA Víctor (first version); Musart (second version)
- Songwriter: Juan Záizar

"Cielo rojo" (Red Sky) is a huapango song written by Juan Záizar, a singer-songwriter from the Mexican state of Jalisco. It is one of Mexican singer Flor Silvestre's greatest hits and also one of her signature songs. She first recorded it in 1957 with the Mariachi Vargas de Tecalitlán for the RCA Víctor label. Four years later, in 1961, she recorded a new version with the Mariachi México of Pepe Villa for the Musart label. The success of her interpretation of this song became the breakthrough of her musical career. She sang it in the film El ciclón (1959), where it was used as a theme song, and as a duet with Luis Aguilar in Juan sin miedo (1961).

== Other versions ==
"Cielo rojo" has been covered by two of Flor's granddaughters, Majo Aguilar and Ángela Aguilar. Majo recorded it as a single in 2016 and included it in her first extended play, Tributo (2017). Ángela recorded it as a single in 2018 and included it in her second studio album, Primero Soy Mexicana.
