= Eduardo Arozamena Medal =

- Awarded for: Fifty years in Mexican cinematic industry
- Country: Mexico
- Presented by: National Association of Actors
- First award: 1951
- Website: www.ANDA.org.mx

The Eduardo Arozamena Medal, (Spanish: Medalla Eduardo Arozamena), is an accolade bestowed by the National Association of Actors to honor actors who have contributed fifty years to the industry of Mexican cinema. Another familiar prize called the Virginia Fábregas Medal awards actors who have twenty-five years.

The medal was originally instituted by singer-actor Jorge Negrete, who was the association's secretary-general in 1951, and who wanted to honor the memory of actor Eduardo Arozamena who died that same year.

== List of Eduardo Arozamena Medal winners ==
=== 1968 ===
María Tereza Montoya.

=== 1996 ===
Julio Monterde

=== 2001 ===
On November 14, 2001; the association held a ceremony in the Teatro Jorge Negrete. It was hosted by Jacqueline Andere and Ricardo Blume.

- José Luis Aarón
- Luis Moya
- Nora Gatica
- Fernando Casanova
- Flor Silvestre
- Antonio Aguilar
