= Guadalajara (song) =

Mariachi song

"Guadalajara" is a well-known mariachi song written and composed by Pepe Guízar in 1937. Guízar wrote the song in honor of his hometown, the city of the same name and state capital of the Mexican state of Jalisco.

== Versions ==
The song was first popularized by Lucha Reyes, a Mexican singer who was born in Guadalajara and is often regarded as the "mother of ranchera music".

In the 1940s, Mexican singer Irma Vila recorded the song and sang it in the musical film Canta y no llores... (1949). Her rendition was later remastered and released in the compilation album Irma Vila, La Reina del Falsete: Todos sus éxitos.

In 1950, Mexican singer Flor Silvestre recorded the song for Columbia Records; her version also became a success and was included in several compilation albums, including Canciones mexicanas, vol. 1, Fandango ranchero, and Flor Silvestre canta sus éxitos (1964).

There have been many notable non-Mexican interpreters of this song. Demetrio González, a Spanish-born singer of Mexican music, performed the song in the film Los cinco halcones (1962). One of the most popular interpretations outside of Mexico was that of Elvis Presley in the final scene of the film Fun in Acapulco (1963). Other popular renditions were performed by Nat King Cole on his album More Cole Español (1962),, Percy Faith on Viva the Music of Mexico (1958),, Desi Arnaz on The Best of Desi Arnaz: The Mambo King, and Spanish-American bandleader Xavier Cugat. Cugat recorded countless albums and appeared in numerous motion pictures in the 1930s and 1940s. He both recorded and performed "Guadalajara" in several movies with his lead singer Lina Romay, the most notable being Week-End at the Waldorf, released in 1945.

Among other notable Mexican interpreters are Rafael Jorge Negrete, Esquivel and His Orchestra and Vicente Fernández.

== Lyrics ==
The entire lyrics are published below. Many performers omit some of the verses. For example, Pedro Infante only sang the first two verses.

Spanish	English translation
Guadalajara, Guadalajara. Guadalajara, Guadalajara. Tienes el alma de provinciana, Hueles a limpia rosa temprana A verde jara fresca del rio, Son mil palomas tu caserio, Guadalajara, Guadalajara, Hueles a pura tierra mojada. Ay ay ay ay! Colomitos lejanos. Ay! Ojitos de agua hermanos. Ay! Colomitos inolvidables, Inolvidables como las tardes En que la lluvia desde la loma No nos dejaba ir a Zapopan.. Ay ay ay ay! Tlaquepaque Pueblito. Tus olorosos jarritos Hacen mas fresco el dulce tepache Junto a la birria con el mariachi Que en los parianes y alfarerias Suena con triste melancolia. Ay ay ay ay! Laguna de Chapala. Tienes de un cuento la magia, Cuento de ocasos y de alboradas, De enamoradas noches lunadas, Quieta, Chapala, es tu laguna, Novia romántica como ninguna. Ay ay ay ay! Zapopitan del alma, Nunca escuché otras campanas Como las graves de tu convento, Donde se alivian mis sufrimientos Triste Zapopan, Misal abierto donde son frailes mis sentimientos. Ay ay ay ay! Guadalajara hermosa. Quiero decirte una cosa: Tu que conservas agua del pozo Y en tus mujeres el fiel rebozo, Guadalajara, Guadalajara; Tienes el alma mas mexicana. Guadalajara, Guadalajara.	Guadalajara, Guadalajara. Guadalajara, Guadalajara. You are the heart of the province, You smell like the pure early rose, Like the fresh green river, You are homeland of a thousand doves. Guadalajara, Guadalajara, You smell like pure moist soil. Ay ay ay ay! Colomitos lejanos. Ay! Familiar water eyes. Ay! Unforgettable Colomitos, Unforgettable like the afternoons On which the rain from the hills does Not let us go to Zapopan. Ay ay ay ay! Tlaquepaque village. Your odorant jugs Provide for the freshest sweet tepache With birria and mariachi That in the markets and pottery shops Do sound with sad melancholy. Ay ay ay ay! Lake Chapala. You are an enchanting romance; A romance of sunsets and sunrises, Of romantic nights in the moonlight. Calm, Chapala, is your lake. Incomparably romantic like nothing else. Ay ay ay ay! Cordial little Zapopan, I have never heard more beautiful bells Than the ones of your cloister Where my suffering is eased. Nostalgic Zapopan, Like an open missal my feelings are those of monks (devout, pure, dedicated with respectful love;also refers to its peaceful, holy atmosphere). Ay ay ay ay! Beautiful Guadalajara. One thing I have to tell you: Your well water is eternally Like the devoted rebozo of your women. Guadalajara, Guadalajara. You're the actual heart of Mexico. Guadalajara, Guadalajara.
