= The Soldiers of Pancho Villa =

- Theatrical release poster
- Directed by: Ismael Rodríguez
- Screenplay by: Ismael Rodríguez; José Luis de Celis; Ricardo Garibay; Antonio Méndez
- Story by: José Bolaños Prado
- Based on: "La Cucaracha"
- Produced by: Ismael Rodríguez
- Starring: María Félix; Dolores del Río
- Cinematography: Gabriel Figueroa
- Edited by: Fernando Martínez
- Music by: Raúl Lavista
- Production company: Películas Rodríguez
- Release date: November 12, 1959 (Mexico)
- Running time: 97 minutes
- Country: Mexico
- Language: Spanish

The Soldiers of Pancho Villa (Spanish: La Cucaracha) is a 1959 Mexican epic historical drama film co-written, produced, and directed by Ismael Rodríguez, inspired by the popular Mexican Revolution corrido "La Cucaracha". It stars María Félix and Dolores del Río in the lead roles, and features Emilio Fernández, Antonio Aguilar, Flor Silvestre, and Pedro Armendáriz in supporting roles.

The film was nominated for a Golden Palm award at the 1959 Cannes Film Festival. It was named the ninety-sixth best film of Mexican cinema by Somos magazine. Filming took place in Zacatecas and in Sierra de Órganos National Park in the town of Sombrerete, México

== Plot ==
When the Mexican Revolution was exploding, there was a woman who made history, her name was "La Cucaracha" (María Félix). Her great passion was the Revolution, but her downfall was a man: Colonel Antonio Zeta (Emilio Fernández), who has eyes for another woman, Isabel, the widow (Dolores del Río). The rivalry between both women explodes.

== Cast ==
- María Félix as Refugio "La Cucaracha"
- Dolores del Río as Isabel
- Emilio Fernández as Colonel Antonio Zeta
- Antonio Aguilar as Captain Ventura
- Flor Silvestre as Lola
- Ignacio López Tarso as Trinidad
- Cuco Sánchez as Soldier
- Irma Torres as Soldadera
- Miguel Manzano as Gabriel Fuentes
- Lupe Carriles as "Trompeta"
- Humberto Almazán as Soldier
- Alicia del Lago as Pregnant soldadera
- Emma Roldán as Midwife
- Tito Novaro as Jacobo Méndez
- Manuel Trejo Morales as Mayor
- Antonio Haro Oliva as Revolutionary priest
- David Reynoso as Colonel Ricardo Zúñiga
- Amado Zumaya as Soldier
- Luis Mario Jarero as Don Lupe
- Manuel Vergara as Soldier
- Guillermo Hernández as Soldier
- Magdaleno Barba
- Armando Gutiérrez as Priest
- José Carlos Méndez as Pinguico
- Pedro Armendáriz as Colonel Valentín Razo
- Los Dorados as Performers at cantina
- Dueto América as Singing revolutionary duet

== Release ==
La Cucaracha premiered at the Robles and Ariel theaters in Mexico City on November 12, 1959 for five weeks. It premiered in the United States at New York City's Tivoli Theatre on November 1, 1961.

=== Critical reception ===
Howard Thompson of The New York Times gave La Cucaracha a positive review by writing: "Although the film never rises in stature above its melodramatic plane and romantic embellishments, it is well acted, crisply directed by producer Ismael Rodríguez and graphically photographed by Gabriel Figueroa... Both Señorita Félix, as the amoral spitfire, and Señorita Del Río, as her aristocratic adversary, are persuasively passionate. Señor Fernández, as their manly quarry, is excellent. Even minus real depth, there is much to be said for a melodramatic eye-filler as tough and tangy as this one. Neighbors below, let's have more."

== Accolades ==
Award	Category	Name	Outcome
Cannes Film Festival	Palme d'Or	Ismael Rodríguez	Nominated
Menorah Awards	Best Actress	María Félix	Won
Menorah Awards	Best Director	Ismael Rodríguez	Won
