= Tres muchachas de Jalisco =

- Directed by: Emilio Gómez Muriel
- Screenplay by: Alfredo Ruanova; Emilio Gómez Muriel
- Story by: Alfredo Ruanova; Emilio Gómez Muriel
- Produced by: Emilio Gómez Muriel
- Starring: Elvira Quintana; Flor Silvestre; María Duval
- Cinematography: Ezequiel Carrasco
- Edited by: Jorge Bustos
- Music by: Antonio Díaz Conde
- Production company: Producciones Cinetelmex
- Release date: January 30, 1964 (Mexico)
- Running time: 100 minutes
- Country: Mexico
- Language: Spanish

Tres muchachas de Jalisco is a 1964 Mexican musical comedy film, produced, written and directed by Emilio Gómez Muriel, and starring Elvira Quintana, Flor Silvestre and María Duval. It is the sequel of the film Tres palomas alborotadas (1963), in which also acted Duval and Quintana alongside Lucha Villa.

== Cast ==
- Elvira Quintana as Elvira
- Flor Silvestre as Flor
- María Duval as María
- Álvaro Zermeño as Manuel
- Carlos López Moctezuma as don Pepe
- León Michel as Mauricio
- Chucho Salinas as Apolonio
- Adolfo Garza as Álvaro
- Sofía Álvarez as doña Lupe
