= Cuco Sánchez =

Mexican singer, songwriter, guitarist, and actor

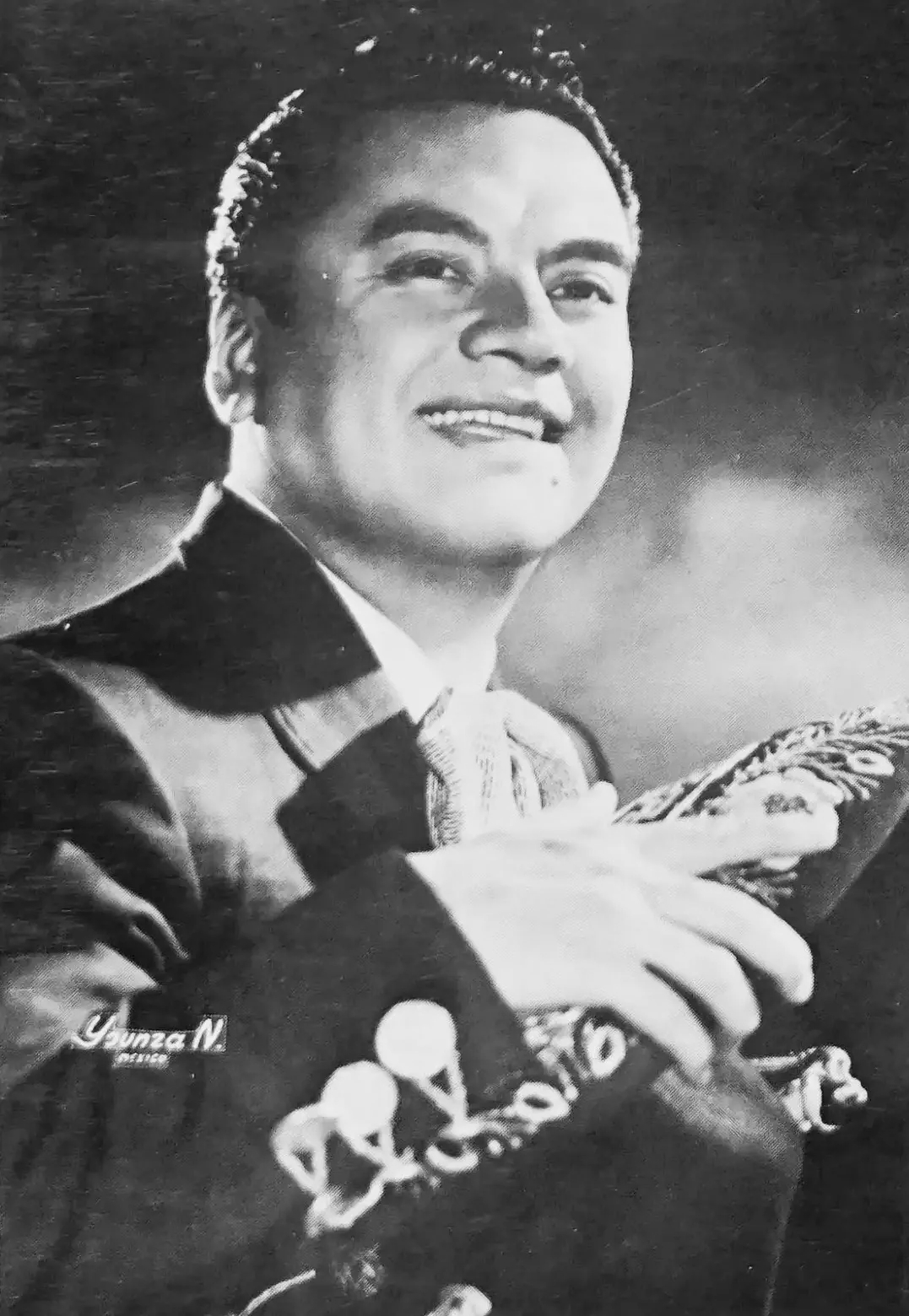
- Cuco Sánchez in 1961

Background information
- Born: José Refugio Sánchez Saldaña; 3 May 1921; Altamira, Tamaulipas, Mexico
- Died: 5 October 2000 (aged 79) Mexico City, Mexico
- Genres: Ranchera, corrido
- Occupations: Singer, songwriter, musician, actor
- Years active: 1937–1997
- Labels: Columbia Records, Caytronics
- Spouse: María Teresa de la Vega

José Refugio "Cuco" Sánchez Saldaña (3 May 1921 – 5 October 2000) was a Mexican singer, songwriter, musician, and actor.

Sánchez was one of Mexico's most popular singers and recorded most of his singles and studio albums for Columbia Records. He is also one of Mexico's most famous and prolific songwriters. His songs include "Anillo de compromiso", "Anoche estuve llorando", "Por qué peca esa mujer", "Fallaste, corazón", "La cama de piedra", "Siempre hace frío", "Arrieros somos", "No soy monedita de oro", "Del cielo cayó una rosa", "Cariño santo", "Nuestro gran amor", "Grítenme, piedras del campo", and "¡Qué manera de perder!".

He also acted in films and television series.

== Life and career ==
Sánchez was born in Altamira, a port city on the Gulf of Mexico, to José Refugio Sánchez and Felipa Saldaña Cabello. He began writing verses in his early years and later learned how to play the guitar. In 1937, at age 15, he wrote his first hit song, "Mi chata", which was recorded by the duet Las Serranitas. In the same year he began singing on the XEW radio station, where he eventually had his own program. Because of his young age and overnight success as a songwriter, he came to be known as El Benjamín de los Compositores (literally "The Benjamin of Songwriters", or "The Youngest of Songwriters").

Mr. Emilio Azcárraga Vidaurreta [the owner of XEW] helped me a lot. My songs came to Lucha Reyes and then all the famous singers sang them, which flattered me, for only then could I really regard myself as a songwriter.

— Cuco Sánchez, 1996 interview

Some of his early songs were "¡Qué rechulo es querer!", "Óigame, compadre", and "Yo también soy mexicano".

His songs were performed, recorded, and made famous by himself and various recording artists, such as Pedro Infante, Miguel Aceves Mejía, La Panchita, Amalia Mendoza, Verónica Loyo, Flor Silvestre, Antonio Aguilar, Dora María, Lucha Villa, Vikki Carr, Linda Ronstadt, Selena, and Chavela Vargas.

Sánchez was married to María Teresa de la Vega. He died of kidney failure on 5 October 2000 in Mexico City.

== Selected filmography ==
- Engagement Ring (1951)
- The Minister's Daughter (1952)
- Pablo and Carolina (1957)
- It Happened in Mexico (1958)
- The Soldiers of Pancho Villa (1959)

== See also ==
- Ranchera
