= Primero soy mexicano =

- Directed by: Joaquín Pardavé
- Screenplay by: Joaquín Pardavé
- Based on: "M'Hijo el Dotor" by Florencio Sánchez
- Produced by: Gregorio Walerstein
- Cinematography: Agustín Martínez Solares
- Edited by: Rafael Ceballos
- Music by: Manuel Esperón
- Production company: Filmex
- Release date: 1 November 1950 (Mexico City)
- Country: Mexico
- Language: Spanish

Primero soy mexicano ("First I am Mexican") is a 1950 Mexican drama-comedy film starring Joaquín Pardavé (who also wrote and directed it), Luis Aguilar, and Flor Silvestre.

== Synopsis ==
Old hacendado don Ambrosio awaits the return of his son Rafael after ten years of studying medicine in the US. The hitherto illiterate Ambrosio is taught reading and writing by his orphaned goddaughter Lupe. When Rafael arrives, he seems to forget to be mexicano ("Mexican") and to be ashamed of his Mexican roots, for he refuses to be served "mole" and asks, rather, for ham and eggs. He is suddenly attracted by Lupe, his father's goddaughter and seduces her. Ambrosio learns that she is pregnant, unbeknownst to Rafael. When Rafael plans to marry Sarita, a high-class lady, Ambrosio and Lupe head to Mexico City to reveal the truth and to prevent Rafael from marrying. He eventually does not marry Sarita, but Fabián (Ambrosio's foreman) is in love with Lupe and is willing to marry her, even though the child is Rafael's. In the end Rafael again recognises his Mexicanness and then proposes marriage to Lupe; Ambrosio is content.

== Cast ==
- Joaquín Pardavé as don Ambrosio Fuentes
- Luis Aguilar - Rafael Fuentes
- Flor Silvestre - Lupe
- Arturo Soto Rangel - don Matías
- Lupe Inclán - Chona
- Felipe Montoya
- Francisco Avitia - Fabián
- José Chávez (uncredited)
- José Escanero (uncredited)
- Raúl Guerrero (uncredited)
- Elodia Hernández - Sarita's mother (uncredited)
- Gloria Mange - Sarita (uncredited)
- Pepe Nava (uncredited)
- Humberto Rodríguez (uncredited)
- Hernán Vera (uncredited)

== Production ==
The film marks singer Flor Silvestre's first starring role, after having appeared in Te besaré en la boca (1950) in a small role. Primero soy mexicano also appears to have been Francisco "Charro" Avitia's first incursion in Mexican cinema. The film was the thirteenth Pardavé directed; it was filmed with a Mitchell camera.
