= El rifle implacable =

1965 film

- Directed by: Miguel M. Delgado
- Written by: José María Fernández Unsáin (story and screenplay)
- Produced by: Heberto Dávila Guajardo (executive producer); Jesús Sotomayor Martínez (producer)
- Starring: Antonio Aguilar, Flor Silvestre, Olivia Michel
- Cinematography: Agustín Martínez Solares
- Edited by: Carlos Savage
- Music by: Sergio Guerrero
- Release date: 1965
- Country: Mexico
- Language: Spanish

El rifle implacable ("The Unforgiving Rifle") is a 1965 Mexican western film written by José María Fernández Unsáin, directed by Miguel M. Delgado and starring Antonio Aguilar, Flor Silvestre and Olivia Michel. This film features the last appearance of the actress Olivia Michel.

It centers on two recently orphaned sisters who hire a wrongly-accused man to help them to overcome a group of bandits.

== Cast ==
- Antonio Aguilar as Martín Peréz
- Flor Silvestre as Luisa Veléz
- Olivia Michel as Ana Veléz
- Víctor Junco as Don Pedro
- Tito Junco as Second sheriff
- Crox Alvarado
- Ramón Bugarini
- Emilio Garibay
- Ramón Valdés as Roque (as Ramon Valdes Castillo)
- Manuel Alvarado as Licenciado Donisio
- Carlos León as First sheriff
- Victorio Blanco (uncredited)
- Noé Murayama as "El Puma" (uncredited)
