= De tal palo tal astilla =

- Directed by: Miguel M. Delgado
- Written by: José María Fernández Unsáin; Eulalio González «Piporro» Alfredo Varela, Jr. Miguel M. Delgado
- Produced by: Jesús Galindo
- Starring: Eulalio González «Piporro» Luis Aguilar; Flor Silvestre; Marina Camacho
- Cinematography: Agustín Jiménez
- Edited by: Jorge Bustos
- Music by: Manuel Esperón
- Production company: Estudios Churubusco
- Distributed by: Filmadora Chapultepec
- Release date: October 20, 1960 (Mexico)
- Running time: 88 minutes
- Country: Mexico
- Language: Spanish

De tal palo tal astilla (English translation: A Chip Off the Old Block) is a 1960 Mexican western comedy film written by José María Fernández Unsáin, directed by Miguel M. Delgado and starring Eulalio González «Piporro», Luis Aguilar, Flor Silvestre and Marina Camacho.

== Cast ==
- Eulalio González «Piporro» as Gumaro Malacara (as Lalo Gonzalez 'Piporro')
- Luis Aguilar as Miguel Marmolejo
- Flor Silvestre as Elena
- Marina Camacho as Rosa
- León Barroso as Sóstenes Morales
- José Jasso "El Ojón" as Cantinero
- Roberto Meyer as Juez de Registro Civil
- Armando Gutiérrez as Notario
- José Chávez as Chalío (credited as Jose T. Chavez)
- Francisco Meneses
- Carlos Guarneros as Mensajero de Chalío
- Aurelio Salinas
- Lupe Carriles as Doña Eulalia

== Production ==
Principal photography began on June 1, 1959, in Estudios Churubusco.

== Release ==
De tal palo tal astilla premiered at the Orfeón theater in Mexico City on October 20, 1960 during one week.
