= Mi destino fue quererte =

Song by Flor Silvestre

from the album La sentimental
- Language: Spanish
- Released: 1964
- Genre: Ranchera
- Length: 3:30
- Label: Musart
- Songwriter: Felipe Valdés Leal

"Mi destino fue quererte" (English: "My Fate Was to Love You") is a ranchera song written by Felipe Valdés Leal in 1940.

== Recordings ==
It was recorded by ranchera singer and actress Flor Silvestre for her studio album La sentimental (1964) and became one of her greatest hits and signature songs.

== Chart ==
Chart (1966)	Peak position
Record World Latin American Single Hit Parade	4
