= Pepe Guízar =

Mexican musician (1906–1980)

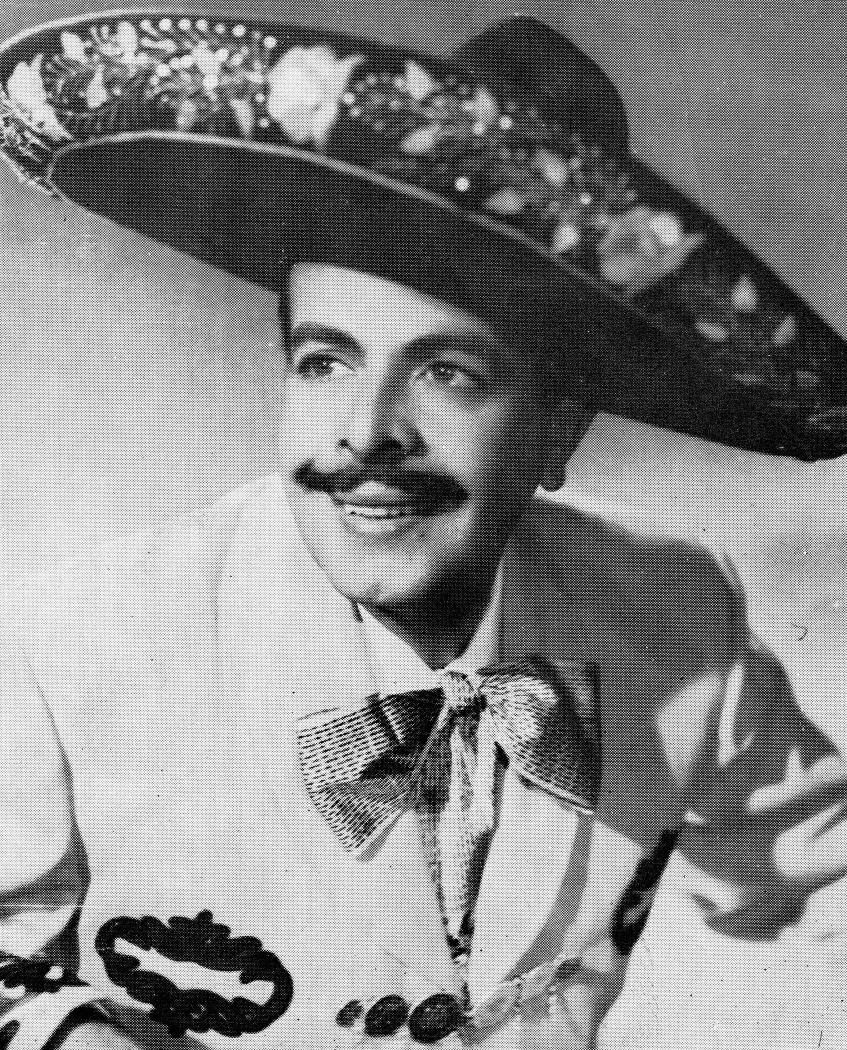
Pepe Guízar in 1954

José Guízar Morfín, better known as Pepe Guízar (February 12, 1906 – 27 September 1980), was a Mexican composer, poet and musician. He composed the song "Guadalajara", a popular mariachi song. His tune, "A Poco No", can be heard in the 1941 film, Citizen Kane.

== Biography ==
Pepe Guízar was the son of Luis Guízar Valencia and Maria Morfín. His early studies were done in the Don Atilano Zavala School and Instituto de Ciencias de Jalisco. In 1928 he moved to Mexico City and entered the National Preparatory School. Later was the first three years of law degree from the Faculty of Law and Social Sciences. He also studied music and recitation at the National Conservatory being started in music and piano by maestro J. Jesus Estrada. Professor Erasmo Castellanos Quinto infected him with a taste for poetry.

Guízar was nicknamed "The musical painter of Mexico" by XEW radio because his compositions draw the musical geography of Mexico. He was a folkloric composer who strove to "dress up" Mexican music, moving it from the streets and bars to enter the concert halls, making it compete with tango and bolero, when they were fashionable. Enamored of the Mexican provincial life and his songs run deep with national roots of Mexico, its people, mariachi, and the people of Jalisco. Besides Guadalajara he wrote Corrido del Norte, Como México no hay dos, and Tehuantepec, all hits that marked an epoch in the life of Mexican music. Pepe Guízar gave validity to an entire musical movement interested in restoring values and life of its people beyond the capital.

The Jalisco state government granted him the Castle of the Colomos to live in, but his poor health did not allow him to inhabit it for long. He traveled frequently to Mexico City to feel surrounded by people and died in one of these trips on September 17, 1980. Today the castle, no longer of "distant Colomitos", bears his name. His remains rest in the Panteón Jardín in Mexico City.

== Select compositions ==
- "Guadalajara"
- "Tehuantepec"
- "El mariachi"
- "Chapala"
- "Sin Ti"
- "A Poco No"

Orson Welles heard "A Poco No" in Mexico, and the tune was used for the jaunty campaign song, "Oh, Mr. Kane", in Citizen Kane (1941). Special lyrics were written by Herman Ruby. The song is also heard in the trailer for the film. He worked in Hollywood and appears in Down Argentine Way (1940).
