= Lucha Reyes (Mexican singer) =

Mexican singer

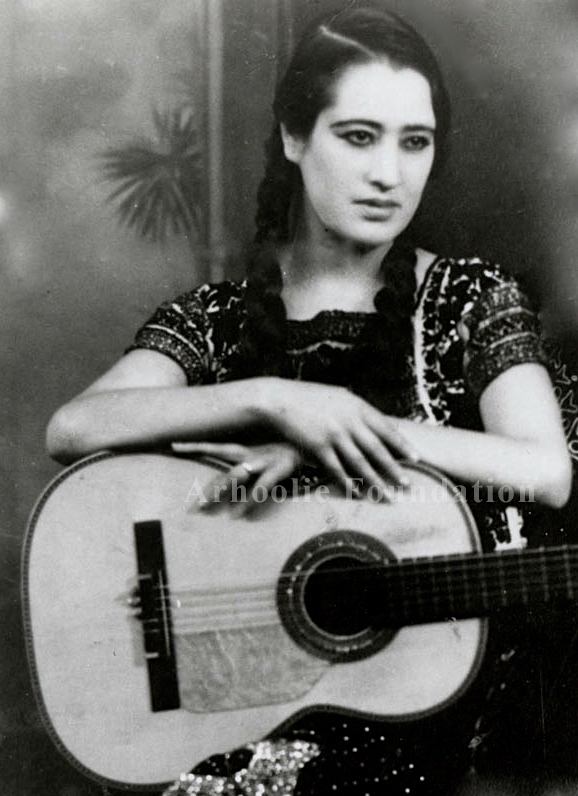
- Reyes in the 1930s
- Born: María de la Luz Flores Aceves; 23 May 1906; Jalisco, Mexico
- Died: 25 June 1944 (aged 38); Mexico City, Mexico
- Other names: "Ranch Queen", "La Reina de la Canción Ranchera", Elvira Luz Reyes,
- Occupations: Singer, actress
- Years active: 1920–1944
- Musical career
- Genres: Ranchera, Mariachi, Mexicana, Regional Mexican music, Pop
- Instrument: Vocals
- Label: RCA Víctor Mexicana

María de Luz Flores Aceves (23 May 1906 – 25 June 1944), known by her stage name Lucha Reyes, was a Mexican singer and actress. Born in Guadalajara, Jalisco, she was popular in the 1930s and 1940s and was called the "Queen of Ranchera".

== Early life ==
Reyes, the daughter of Miguel Ángel Flores and Victoria Aceves, lost her father when she was still small. She took the surname Reyes from her mother's second husband, who took care of her until she was a teenager. Soon after, she moved with her family to Mexico City, where they lived in a modest house in Colonia Morelos. Because of the family's financial problems, she never finished primary school. Later she joined the church choir at Iglesia de Carmen. Her career began at the age of 13, when she performed in a tent in the Plaza San Sebastián near her house in the Federal District, alternating with comedians like Amelia Wilhelmy, José Limón, and the Acevedo Brothers.

== Career ==
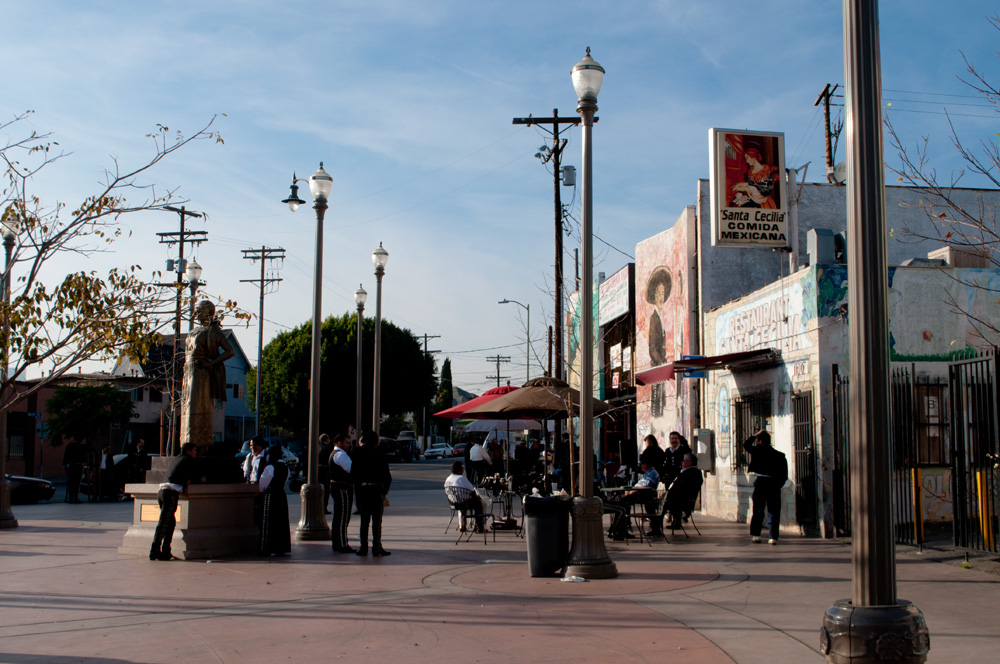
Mariachi Plaza in Boyle Heights, where the Mexican influence of East Los Angeles continues to predominate. The statue commemorates Lucha Reyes (1906–1944).

Reyes traveled to the United States to study voice, and in 1920 went on tour to several states, where she became an icon among the local Hispanics. She teamed up with Nancy Torres, and decided to stay in Los Angeles. It was during this tour that she met the journalist Gabriel Navarro, and they were married shortly after. Reyes suffered a miscarriage, lost the child, and they divorced. In 1924, she returned to Mexico.

Reyes would eventually decide to launch a solo career, and she became popular with Mexican radio listeners, while keeping a busy theater schedule. In 1927, she tried to conquer Europe, joining Juan N. Torreblanca on a tour of that continent. It was cancelled when it reached Berlin, for unpublicized reasons. A popular piano player who travelled with them had to play one night at an infamous local bar for her to be able to afford an air ticket back to Mexico. One positive aspect about this tour was that Reyes was able to record her first record, one of the first records to introduce Mexican music to European audiences. Reyes was not a ranchera singer during this period of her career, she was rather a soprano. Reyes had taken light clothing with her for her European tour; this, combined with the cold weathers of Europe when compared to Mexico, caused her to get sick and, eventually, to lose her voice. Her voice ailment was the cause of a voice change, and, upon returning, she started singing "rancheras". One of her first songs in the ranchera genre, "Guadalajara", became a classic.

In 1928, Reyes launched a career as a solo artist, and a year later began her best years as an artist, achieving successes with songs like "La Tequilera", "¡Ay Jalisco, no te rajes!", "El corrido de Chihuahua", "El herradero", "La Panchita", "Traigo un amor", "Juan Colorado", "El castigador", "Rayando el sol", "Caminito de Contreras", and more. In 1930, the entrepreneur Frank Founce contracted with her to perform several concerts on the stage of the Million Dollar Theater in Los Angeles.

Reyes also appeared in films. She played supporting roles in Con los dorados de Villa (1939) and El Zorro de Jalisco (1941). Her last film appearances were musical guest roles in ¡Ay Jalisco... no te rajes! (1941) and Flor silvestre (1943).

== Personal life and death ==
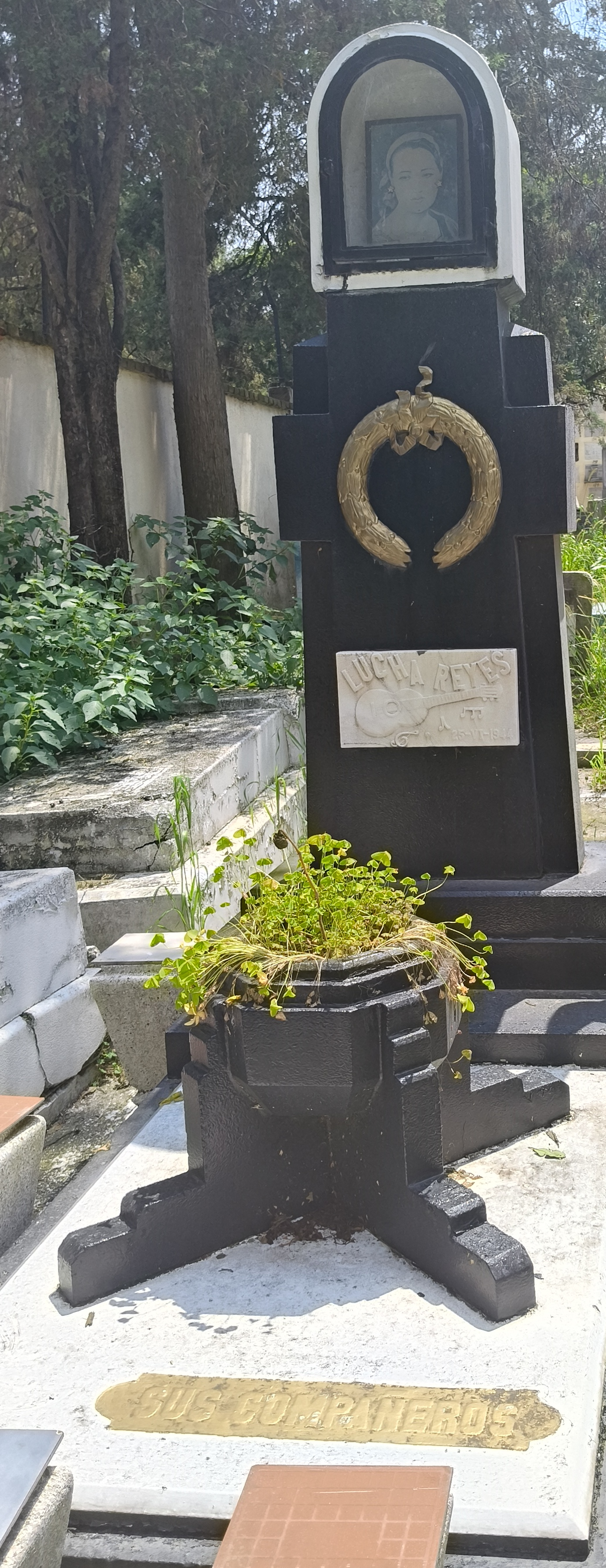
Grave of Lucha Reyes in 2025

Reyes married three times. In 1934, she married her second husband, producer Félix Martín Cervantes. At the time of her death, she was married to Antonio Vega Medina, a pilot.

Like many of her contemporary stars, such as Jorge Negrete, Pedro Infante, José Alfredo Jiménez and Javier Solís, she had a short life. She died on 25 June 1944 of an "acute intoxication" caused by an "unknown substance, probably barbiturates (Nembutal)".

== Legacy ==
She has a statue in East Los Angeles, California as she visited the city many times during her career. The statue is located in Mariachi Plaza in the east Los Angeles area of the city, a predominantly Hispanic neighborhood.
