= Guty Cárdenas =

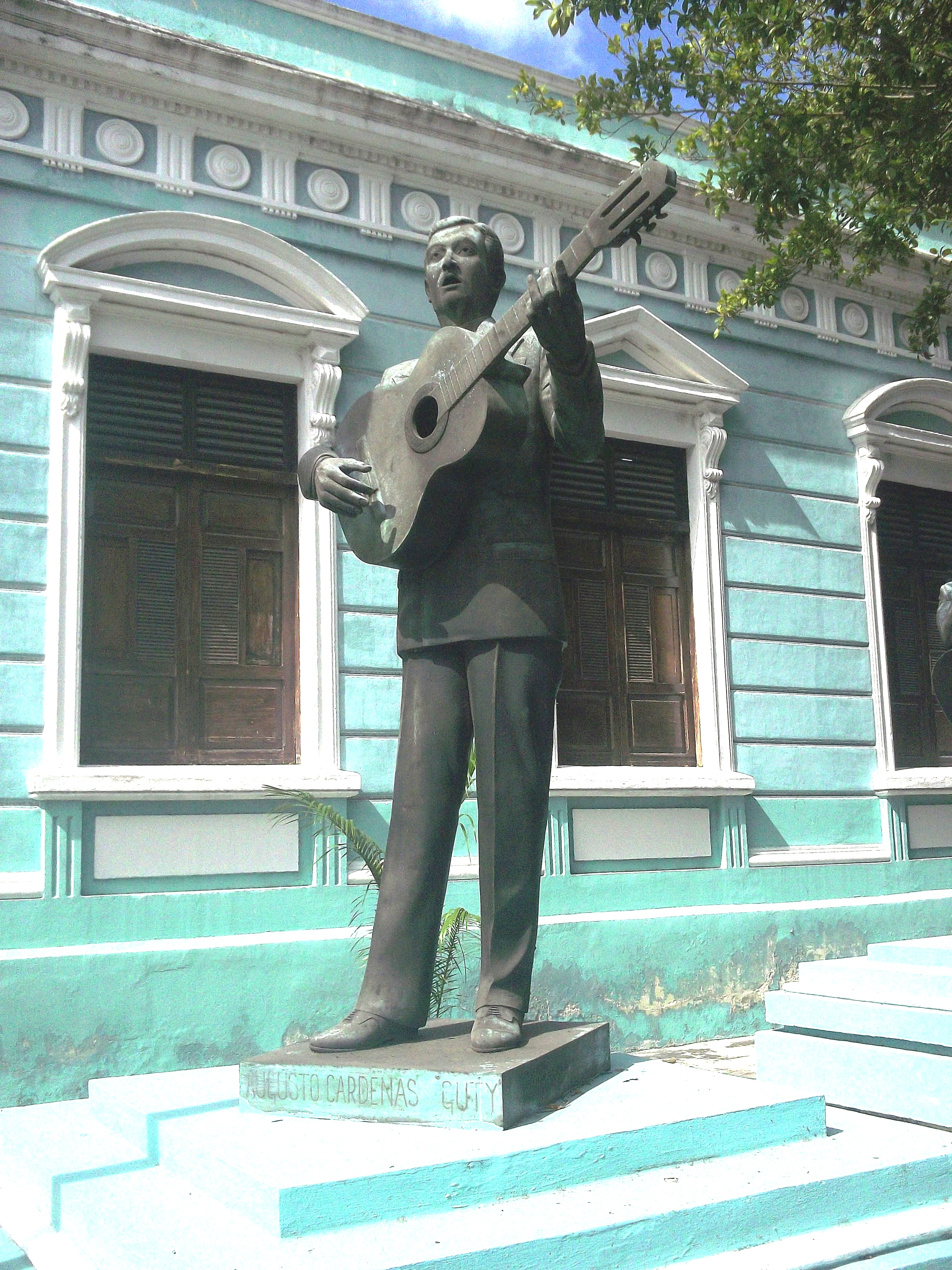
- Statue of Guty Cárdenas in Mérida, Yucatán

Background information
- Birth name: Augusto Alejandro Cárdenas Pinelo
- Born: 12 December 1905; Mérida, Yucatán, Mexico
- Died: 5 April 1932 (aged 26); Mexico City, Mexico
- Occupation(s): Composer, guitarist, troubadour
- Labels: Columbia Records

Guty Cárdenas (1905–1932; full name Augusto Alejandro Cárdenas Pinelo) was a Mexican composer, singer and guitarist, noted as a representative of the cancion yucateca style of music. His well-known works include "Nunca", with lyrics by Ricardo López Méndez. He spent several years in the US, recording with Columbia Records.

He was killed, at the age of 27, by a stray bullet during a gunfight in a Mexico City bar.

The 1989 Aki Kaurismäki film Leningrad Cowboys Go America is dedicated to his memory. Kaurismaki also prominently featured his song “Dile a Tus Ojos” in his film Shadows in Paradise.
