= Chucho Monge =

Mexican composer

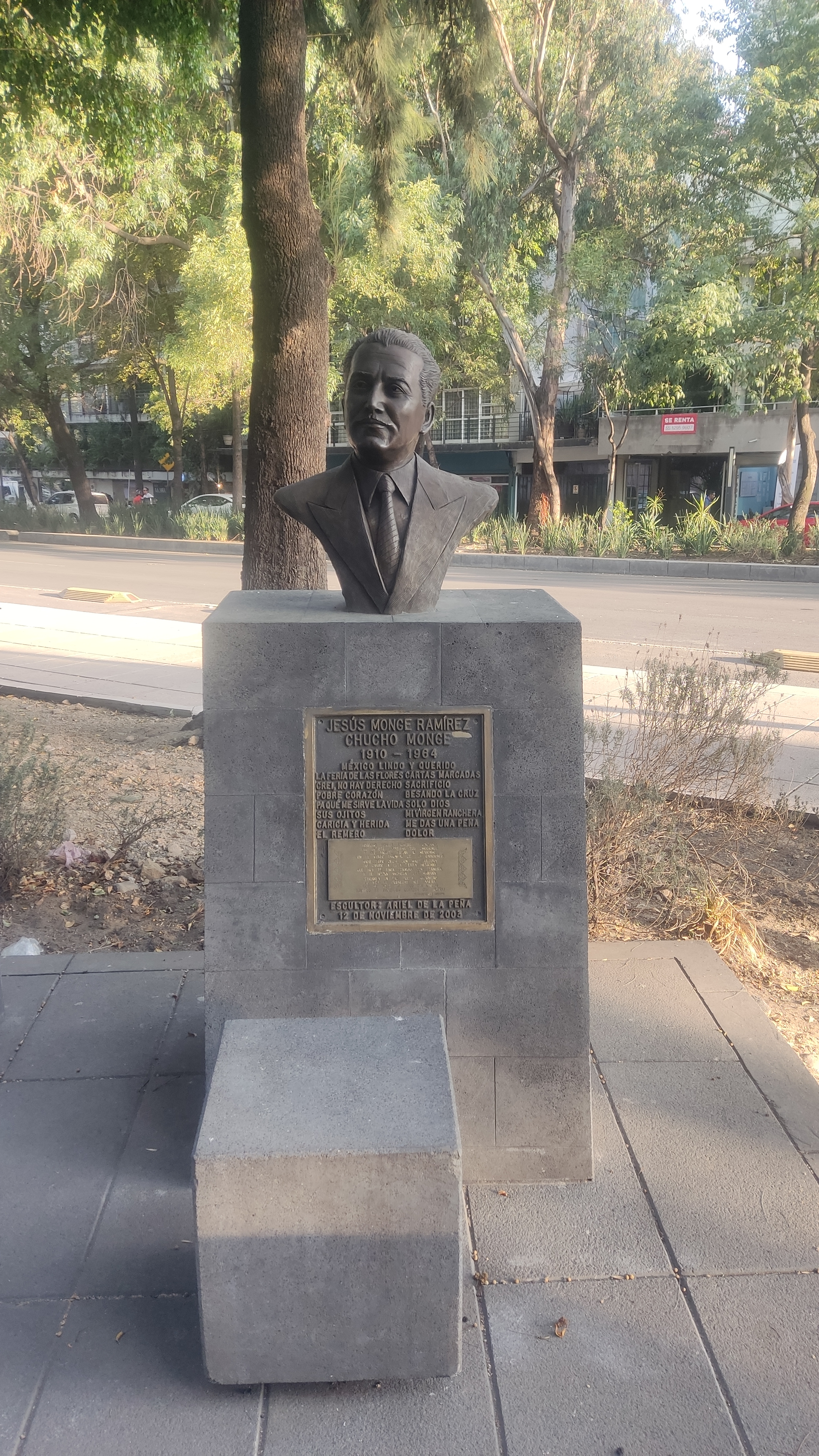
Bust in Plaza de los Compositores

Jesús Monge Ramírez (November 9, 1910 – August 9, 1964), better known as Chucho Monge, was a Mexican composer best known for writing traditional songs. Born in Morelia, Michoacán, he is the writer of several well-known songs, including "México Lindo y Querido", "La Feria de las Flores", "Pobre Corazón", and "Cartas Marcadas", among others.

Monge started his musical career competing against other composers like Agustín Lara and Alfonso Esparza Oteo in waltz composition contests. Later on, he became a radio artist in XEQ, XEW and XEB stations.

He developed a partnership with Lucha Reyes, who helped popularize his song “La Feria de las Flores”. The song was inspiration for a Disney movie that never happened, for legal reasons.

He co-founded the Sociedad de Autores y Compositores de Música de México (Society of Authors and Composers of Music of Mexico), alongside composers Gonzalo Curiel, Alfonso Esparza Oteo, and Tata Nacho.
