= La Panchita =

Mexican singer (??–2014)

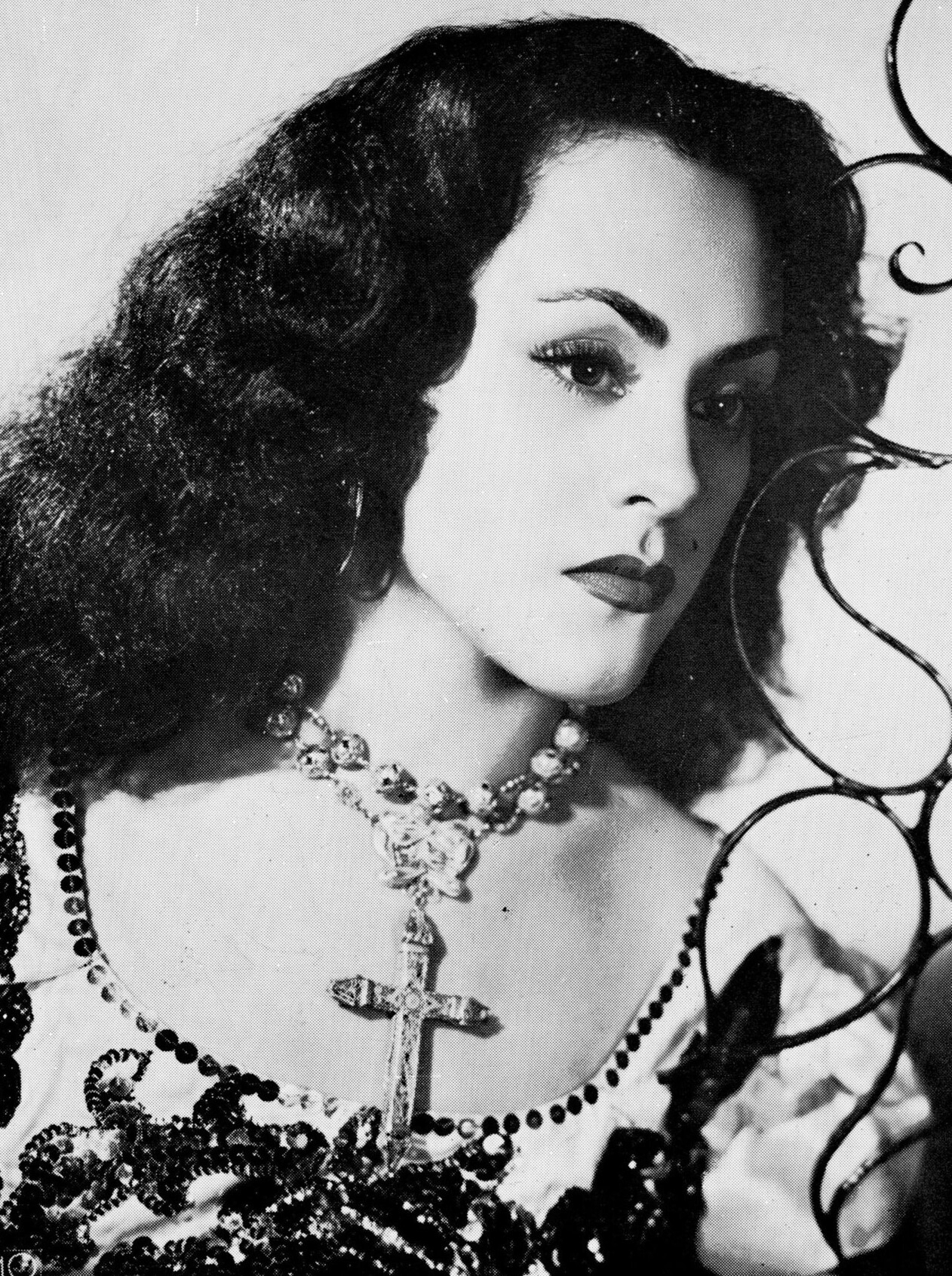
- Born: María de los Ángeles Muñoz Rodríguez
- Died: 8 November 2014; Monterrey, Nuevo León, Mexico
- Occupation: Singer
- Spouse: Paco Miller
- Musical career
- Genres: Ranchera; bolero; Peruvian waltz
- Instrument: Vocals
- Labels: Peerless; RCA Víctor; Musart

María de los Ángeles Muñoz Rodríguez, known by her stage name La Panchita, was a Mexican singer specialized in the musical genres of ranchera, bolero and Peruvian waltz.

She took her stage name from the song of the same name by Joaquín Pardavé. She began her career singing rancheras, but after a tour of South America, she brought new songs to her repertoire, such as the Peruvian waltz "Nube gris". In the 1940s and 1950s, she recorded many songs for the Peerless and RCA Víctor labels, with the Mariachi Vargas de Tecalitlán.

She married the Ecuadorian ventriloquist Paco Miller. She died on 8 November 2014 in Monterrey, Nuevo León, Mexico.

== Partial discography ==
=== Peerless ===
- "La pajarera" (1947)
- "Sabe Dios" (1947)
- "Decepcionado" (1947)
- "La rejega" (1947)
- "Dos luceros" (1948)
- "Las tres "efes"' (1948)
- "El aburrido" (1948)
- "El sauce y la palma" (1948)

=== RCA Víctor ===
- "Corazón, no te rajes" (1951)
- "Nube gris" (1951)
- "Estrellita del sur" (1952)
- "El buque fantasma" (1952)
- "La campesina" (1952)
- "En mi pensamiento" (1952)
- "Mi aventura" (1952)
- "Alma, corazón y vida" (1953)
- "Corazón, ¿por qué?" (1953)
- "Corazón" (1953)
- "Nuestro amor" (1953)
- "Desafío" (1954)
- "Los dos perdimos" (1954)
- "Arrieros somos" (1955)
- "El andariego" (1955)
- "La casita blanca" (1955)

=== Musart ===
- "Mis noches sin ti"
- "Nube gris" (second version)
- "Si nos dejan"
- "Alma, corazón y vida" (second version)
- "Dime adiós sin llorar"
- "Verdad amarga"
- "Extráñame"
- "Bella sultana"
- "Materia"
- "Estrellita del sur" (second version)
- "Por qué, Dios mío"
- "Destino amargo"
- "Así paso"
- "Hazme morir"
- "Vida vacía"
- "Peligro"
- "Gota a gota"
- "Flor encantada"
- "El roble"
- "Lamparita"

== Filmography ==
- La liga de las canciones (1941)
