= Chamín Correa =

Mexican musician (1929–2020)

Chamin Correa
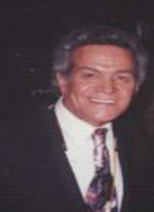

Background information
- Also known as: "El Mejor Requinto de América"
- Born: Benjamin Correa Pérez de León; 4 December 1929; Mexico City, Mexico
- Died: 14 January 2020 (aged 90) Cuernavaca, Morelos
- Genre: Romantic Music
- Occupations: Musician, Artist, Record producer
- Instruments: Requinto guitar
- Years active: 1950–2020
- Labels: Producciones Chamin Correa, I.M. Records
- Formerly of: Chamin Correa y los Tres Caballeros
- Website: www.chamincorrea.com.mx

Benjamín "Chamín" Correa (4 December 1929 – 14 January 2020) was a Mexican guitarist. He was renowned in the Spanish-speaking world for his traditional romantic music. Member of Los Tres Caballeros together with Roberto Cantoral and Leonel Gálvez from 1954. In 1957 they gained 4 golden discs for being the trio of major success on a global scale. He died in Cuernavaca, Morelos at the age of 90.

== Career ==
He was only 5 years old when his father Don Manuel Escamilla, director of the Fine Arts Symphony, introduced him to the beautiful world of the guitar. Later he took classical guitar lessons with his maternal grandfather Judge Enrique Pérez de León.

Chicago Tribune: "Chamin Correa Perez de León learned classical guitar when he was kneehigh from his grandfather and by the time he was 11 he was plugged in and gigging all over Mexico City."

His career spans over six decades and he has released 150 records on vinyl and in CD format. They call him the "Requinto De Oro" which translates to "Golden Requinto" because of his talent of playing the Requinto Guitar.

On his own web site there are a number of videos, one shows him singing in a lead role in a black-and-white movie from the 1950s. Another video shows him in a recent concert performing with Gloria Estefan. This shows how long he has performed at the forefront of the genre of traditional Latin-American music.

Chamin Correa has released many albums, both solo and with groups - including Los Tres Caballeros. He has also recorded with many famous artists, including El Tri, Dave Brubeck, Joan Baez, Gloria Estefan, José José, Enrique Guzmán, Luis Miguel, Victor Yturbe El Piruli, and Marco Antonio Muñiz. His main instrument is a nylon-stringed concert guitar.

His most popular songs include 'El reloj', 'La barca', 'Donde estás', 'Poquita Fe', 'Regalame esta noche', 'Alma de Cristal' and 'Noche no te vayas'.

Unfortunately Chamín Correa died in a hospital in Mexico City at around 7:00 PM January 14, 2020. Chamín died in his sleep, the cause of death was Pulmonary emphysema. They interviewed his daughter shortly after the news came out of his death. Chamín had some health issues in his later years and he was in really bad condition in his last months.

Famous singer Rodrigo De La Cadena made a tribute for Chamín Correa held at Teatro De La Ciudad on February 9, 2020. Various artists collaborated with Rodrigo such as Chamin's family.

== Producer, arranger, artist ==
For thirty years as artistic director he directed and produced with his arrangements for artists such as Enrique Guzman, Oscar Chavez, Julio Iglesias, Tehua, Lucho Gatica, Olga Guillot, Flor Silvestre, Tony Aguilar, Luis Miguel, Gloria Estefan, Simon, Juan Gabriel, Vicente Fernandez, Rocio Durcal, Tania Libertad, José José and Victor Iturbe "El Piruli" among others.

In his role as guitarist in IM Records, he sold over 5 million of the instrumental album "Cuerdas, Amor y Guitarra" playing different kinds of guitars such as the fife, acoustics, electro- acoustic, country, steel, electrical and even different types of electric bass. He has been awarded four golden records and for eight consecutive years "The Golden Guitar" award at the Festival of Pezzaro in Italy.

In May 1967 Correa appeared with Dave Brubeck and his quartet in a series of live performances in Mexico City. The concerts were issued on the album Bravo! Brubeck! in 1967.

== Guitars produced branded with his name ==
A line of guitars is produced which bears his name, "Correa Chamin Guitars," and has a wide variety of high quality models supervised by him personally.

== Discography ==
=== Solo releases ===
- Cuerdas, amor y guitarra, Vol. 5(2005)
- Éxitos, Vol. 2 (2002)
- 30 grandes éxitos (2000)
- 20 éxitos (2000)
- Cuerdas, amor y guitarra (2000)
- Cuerdas, amor y guitarra, Vol. 2 (2000)
- A mi amigo José (1999)
- Colección de Oro (1999)
- Bolero (1995)
- En Vivo, Vol. 1 (?)

=== Appearances ===
- El Tri, 4 décadas en vivo (2008)
- Su historia y éxitos musicales, Vol. 1 (2004)
- Su historia y éxitos musicales, Vol. 2 (2004)
- De qué manera te olvido/Lobo herido, Vol. 11 (2003)
- El Príncipe con trío, Vol. 3 (2003)
- El Príncipe con trío, Vol. 2 (2003)
- El Príncipe con trío, Vol. 1 (2003)
- Colección RCA: 100 años de música (2002)
- Canciones inéditas de María (2001)
- Greatest Hits, Vol. 2 (2001)
- Dulce romance (2000)
- 30 éxitos (2000)
- 15 éxitos (2000)
- Latinoamor (2000)
- 20 éxitos (2000)
- Lobo herido (2000)
- Todo o nada (1998)
- Te deseo, amor, Vol. 2 (1997)
- Me vas a extrañar (1994)
- Te deseo, amor (1993)
- Time Signatures: A Career Retrospective (1992)
- El dueto del siglo (?)
- Serie Platino (?)
- Mi tierra (?)
- Bravo! Brubeck! (Columbia, live, 1967)
