= Musart Records =

Discos Musart
- LP released by Musart.
- Parent company: Craft Recordings
- Founded: 1948
- Genre: Mexican music
- Country of origin: United States
- Location: Miami, Florida
- Official website: discosmusart.com

Discos Musart, known as Musart Records in English, is a Mexican record label founded in 1948 in Mexico City. It is headquartered in Miami, Florida, and is an independent producer, publisher and distributor of Latin music, managing over 72,000 copyrights and 5,000 master recordings with a particular emphasis on the regional Mexican genre. Musart has long been the centerpiece of the music industry in Mexico, with a catalog of classic songs from artists such as Joan Sebastian, Antonio Aguilar, Chalino Sánchez, Pepe Aguilar, Paquita la del Barrio and Grupo Laberinto. Originally founded by Eduardo Baptista Covarrubias, the Baptista family built the Group into a vehicle for both well-established and developing Mexican artists.

Until Capitol Records opened in Mexico in 1965, recordings by the Beatles were released by Musart Records in Mexico.

The Group's Recorded Music Division, consisting of four labels—Discos Musart, Balboa Records, Panart, and Top Hits, is a full-service producer and distributor of Latin music. While Musart is particularly strong in regional Mexican music, the Group also produces and licenses music across salsa, merengue, mariachi, ranchera, tropical and other contemporary genres, making it the top independent producer in the Latin music marketplace.

Musart was acquired by Concord Bicycle Music (now Concord) in 2016.

== Notable artists ==
The following artists have been part of the Musart roster:

- Alberto Vázquez
- Angélica María
- Antonio Aguilar
- Avelina Landín
- Cuisillos de Arturo Macias
- Carmela Rey
- Carmela y Rafael
- César Costa
- Chalino Sanchez
- Cornelio Reyna
- Dora María
- El Piporro
- Esmeralda
- Flor Silvestre
- Gloria Lasso
- Irma Dorantes
- Joan Sebastian
- Juan Torres
- La Panchita
- Lisa Lopez
- Lorenzo Antonio
- Lucerito
- Lucha Villa
- Lupe Silva
- Manolo Muñoz
- María Dolores Pradera
- María Enriqueta
- Mercedes Castro
- Olga Guillot
- Pancho Barraza
- Paquita la del Barrio
- Pepe Aguilar
- Rosa de Castilla
- Rosita Quintana
- Sylvester James
- Uberto Zanolli

== See also ==
- List of record labels
