= Paint Me a Road Out of Here =

2024 documentary

- Directed by: Catherine Gund
- Produced by: Tanya Selvaratnam
- Starring: Faith Ringgold; Mary Enoch Elizabeth Baxter
- Release date: 2024

Paint Me a Road Out of Here is a 2024 documentary film featuring artist and activist Faith Ringgold and interdisciplinary artist Mary Enoch Elizabeth Baxter. It was directed by Catherine Gund. The film uncovers the whitewashed history of Faith's masterpiece "For the Women's House" and follows its 50-year journey from Rikers Island to the Brooklyn Museum in a heartbreaking, funny and true parable for a world without mass incarceration.
