= Selva (name) =

Selva is a unisex given name. People with the name include:

- Selva (actor), Indian film actor
- Selva (director), Indian director
- Selva Almada (born 1973), Argentine writer
- Selva Casal (1927–2020), Uruguayan poet
- Selva Erdener, Turkish operatic soprano singer
- Selva Orejón (born 1981), Spanish cybersecurity and digital identity consultant
- Selva Rasalingam (born 1968), British actor
- Selva Selvaratnam, British businessman
- Selva Kumar Silvaras, also spelt Selvar Kumar Silvaras, Singaporean convicted murderer
- Selva Lewis Burdette,

Went by Lew Burdete, professional baseball player for the Boston Braves

== See also ==
- Selva (disambiguation)
- Selva (surname)
