= La Macorina =

Cuban prostitute

- Born: María Constancia Caraza Valdés; 1892; Guanajay, Captaincy General of Cuba, Spanish Empire
- Died: 15 June 1977 (aged 84–85); Havana, Cuba
- Other names: María Calvo Nodarse
- Occupation: Prostitute
- Years active: 1917–1934

María Calvo Nodarse (1892 in Guanajay – 15 June 1977, in Havana), better known as La Macorina, was a Cuban prostitute who was a friend of ex-president José Miguel Gómez, whom she supported during the Chambelona War. She was the first woman to hold a driving license in the Americas.

== Biography ==
La Macorina was born María Constancia Caraza Valdés in 1892 in Guanajay, Cuba, then in Pinar del Río Province. She was of Afro-Chinese heritage. At 15 she left home and moved to Havana with her boyfriend. Although her parents tried to get her to return, she stayed in Havana. Facing financial hardship, La Macorina turned to prostitution. She assumed the name María Calvo Nodarse and moved to Galiano Street, near the Malecón, a popular location in Havana at the time, including for prostitution.

Her beauty, elegance and personality helped La Macorina enter the most select circles of Cuban society at the time. She was selective of her clients and in an interview by Guillermo Villarronda for Bohemia magazine in 1958, she said "more than a dozen men were at my feet, full of money, and begging for love.” She wore her hair short in the Garzón style, which was considered scandalous at the time, and smoked cigars.

By the time she retired in 1934 she had amassed a fortune. She owned mansions in Havana, Calzada, Linea and San Miguel, race horses, expensive furs, a large collection of valuable jewellery and 9 cars.

=== Chambelona War ===
General, later president, José Miguel Gómez was one of her protectors. La Macorina supported him during the Chambelona War. When Gómez was imprisoned in the Castillo del Príncipe, La Macorina retained her loyalty. She visited him and campaigned for his release and ferried his supporters around in her cars. La Macorina herself was imprisoned for 25 days in Havana prison during the period for her opposition to President Mario García Menocal. Although Menocal had ordered her to be treated harshly in prison, warden Andrés Hernández arranged for her to have separate quarters and, in her words, "treated me like a queen".

=== Decline and death ===
La Macorina retired in 1934 when the country's economics took a downturn and, at 42, her looks had started to fade. Although she had amassed a fortune, she was spending two thousand pesos a month and subsequently had to begin selling her assets. Her previous friends distanced themselves from her and she eventually ended up living in poverty in a rented room in Havana. La Macorina died in Havana on 15 June 1977.

== In popular culture ==
Macorina

Put your hand here, Macorina,
put your hand here.
Your feet left the mat
and your saya ran away
looking for the guard
that when your size was so fine,
the sugarcanes
were thrown down the road
so that you could grind them
as if you were a mill.
Your breasts, flesh of anon,
your mouth a blessing
of ripe soursop,
and your thin waist was
the same as that
hot danzon of that danzon.
Then the dawn
that carries you from my arms,
and I without knowing what to do
with that smell of woman,
mango and new cane
with which you filled me to the
warm sound of that danzón.

—Poem by Alfonso Camín
-Recorded as a song by Chavela Vargas

The Asturian Alfonso Camín wrote a poem about her, "Macorina", which was later recorded as a song by Chavela Vargas, one of the best-known songs of her career. The chorus is a suggestive "Put Your Hand Here Macorina ...". Vargas met La Macorina in Havana "getting out of a white car" and was struck by her "slanted eyes and fierce hair." She later said of La Macorina “She was a beautiful woman. Black mixed from China. I saw her and I was speechless.” The song became the "lesbian hymn" and was banned in Spain during Francoism.

La Macorina frequently drove around Havana in a red convertible Hispano-Suiza. Artist Cundo Bermúdez portrayed her in that setting in a painting from memory in 1978, the year after her death. The red car also featured in the modified lyrics of the 1950s recording of "Macorina" by Abelardo Barroso.

Poet Vigil Díaz wrote enthusiastically about La Macorina in his "Fatamorgana" column for the Dominican newspaper Listín Diario.

In his novel Las Impuras, Miguel de Carrion based the main character La Aviadora on La Macorina.

In the brass bands parade during the Charangas de Bejucal annual festival, La Macorina was honoured as one of the parade's characters by a doll with a mask of her face. The doll has been preserved. La Macorina is still one of the characters of the Charangas, usually being present on the floats of "La Espina de Oro" and the "La Ceiba de Plata".

== Origin of "La Macorina" ==
The nickname La Macorina is reputed to have come from a drunken young man. Whilst walking past the Acera del Louvre (the terrace of the Louvre cafe where Cuba's literati and baseball players met), the young man on seeing her beauty said "there goes La Macorina!". He had meant to say "La Fornarina", mistaking her for the famous Spanish cupletista, Consuelo Bello, who was commonly called La Fornarina after the famous painting of the same name by Italian master Raphael of his lover Margarita Luti.

== Cars and driving ==
La Macorina's first car, a Ford, was presented to her as compensation by an influential politician who had run her over in his car. Having the car, she applied and was issued with a Havana driving licence in 1917 under the name of María Calvo Nodarse, the first woman in the Americas to be issued with a licence.

At the time, licences could be denied if the applicant was of an "immoral character". It has been speculated that sexual favours were given by La Macorina to obtain her licence. There are anecdotal reports that La Macorina had problems with the police soon after she obtained her licence due to her poor driving.

By the time of her retirement in 1934 she owned 9 cars, mostly European brands, including a red Mercedes and two from Hispano-Suiza, one white and one a red convertible. She was often seen driving around Havana in one of the Hispano-Suizas with popular music of the time playing loudly. The current owners of her cars sometimes bring them together as the "La Macorina Club" for exhibitions in Havana.

== See also ==
- Prostitution in Cuba

== Bibliography ==
- Alfonso, Vanessa (12 April 2016). "The True History of La Macorina". www.radiometropolitana.icrt.cu (in European Spanish). Archived from the original on 3 December 2019.
- Bono, Ferran (8 October 2013). "Chavela Vargas y la deslumbrante belleza de Macorina" [Chavela Vargas and the dazzling beauty of Macorina]. El País (in Spanish).
- del Castillo Pichardo, José (18 November 2017). "Ponme la mano aquí Macorina" [Put your hand here Macorina]. www.diariolibre.com (in European Spanish).
- Cooke, Julia (2014). The Other Side of Paradise: Life in the New Cuba. Basic Books. ISBN 978-1-58005-532-1.
- Echevarria, Roberto Gonzalez (2001). The Pride of Havana: A History of Cuban Baseball. Oxford University Press. ISBN 978-0-19-534917-7.
- Iglesias, Gema Rull (24 April 2008). "La primera mujer que condujo un auto y que obtuvo una licencia de conducción" [The first woman to drive a car and obtain a license from driving] (PDF). www.sld.cu (in Spanish).
- Nodal, Leonel (24 February 2019). "Macorina, el nombre de una leyenda" [Macorina, the name of a legend]. Excelencias del Motor (in Spanish).
- Ortega, Josefina (2008). "La Macorina". La Jiribilla (in Spanish). Archived from the original on 18 November 2019.
- Ramos-Kittrell, Jesús A. (2019). Decentering the Nation: Music, Mexicanidad, and Globalization. Rowman & Littlefield. ISBN 978-1-4985-7318-4.
- Ross, Ciro Bianchi (2017). Cuba: A different Story. RUTH. ISBN 978-959-211-427-2.
- Schweid, Richard (2009). Che's Chevrolet, Fidel's Oldsmobile: On the Road in Cuba. Univ of North Carolina Press. ISBN 978-0-8078-8862-9.
- Valenzuela, Lídice (2004). "Los almendrones: museo rodante de La Habana" [Los almendrones: rolling museum of Havana]. www.cmbfradio.cu. Archived from the original on 31 May 2009.
