= Macorina =

1961 song by Chavela Vargas

Single by Chavela Vargas
- Songwriters: Chavela Vargas (music), Alfonso Camín (underlying poem)

"Macorina" is a song written by Mexican singer Chavela Vargas and based on a poem by Alfonso Camín. It was first recorded by Vargas in 1961. The song was controversial due to its reference to romantic longing between women and became a "lesbian hymn."

== La Macorina ==
The song is based on a poem written by Alfonso Camín (1890–1982) about María Calvo Nodarse (1892–1977), a Cuban woman who became known as La Macorina. La Macorina gained fame in Cuba for her beauty, personality, and scandalous lifestyle, which included smoking cigars, driving a red convertible, wearing her hair short, and working as one of the most elegant prostitutes in Havana. Camín's poem, titled "Macorina", was published in 1931.

== Chavela Vargas ==
Chavela Vargas (1919–2012) was a Costa Rica-born singer who moved to Mexico as a teenager. She sang on the streets and later became a professional singer. In addition to her music, she became known for her lifestyle, which included dressing as a man, smoking cigars, carrying a gun, drinking heavily and wearing a red poncho. She publicly came out as a lesbian at age 81.

== The song ==
Vargas met La Macorina in Havana and was struck by her beauty. Vargas recalled: "I saw her and I was speechless." Vargas later wrote music to accompany the words of Camín's poem. Prior to Vargas' version, the Cuban bandleader Abelardo Barroso had a hit song about La Macorina.

Vargas recorded the song in 1961 for her first record, Noche Bohemia. It became one of her most famous songs. Indeed, Marvette Perez, curator of Latin-American Culture and Music for the Smithsonian Museum of American History, described it as the song that made Vargas famous. Perez noted: "I don't think there could be a more queer song for a woman to sing. The song says, 'Ponme la mano aqui, Macorina.' Put your hand right here, Macorina. And whenever she sang the song, she put such sexuality, desire and kind of sensuality into it that you knew why she was singing, why she was singing and to who she was singing it. She was singing it to a woman."

Vargas' live performances of the song were described as "openly suggestive of lesbian desire." When singing the line, "Put your hand right here," Vargas would place her hand between her legs, engage the gaze of a woman in the audience, and "emulate the sexual pleasure of feeling the lover's hand."

"Macorina" has been described as "the first erotic song that one woman dedicated to another." It became "the lesbian hymn". Due to its homoerotic message, the song was banned in Francoist Spain.

== Performances by others ==
The song has also been recorded by others, including Susana Baca on her 2000 album Eco de Sombras.
