= Selvaratnam =

Selvaratnam may refer to

- Daniel Selvaratnam Thiagarajah, Sri Lankan Tamil bishop.
- Karu Selvaratnam, Malaysian sprinter.
- Rohan Selvaratnam, Malaysian cricketer.
- Selva Selvaratnam, British businessman.
- Tanya Selvaratnam, Author and activist.
- Saravana Selvaratnam, Branch of Saravana stores.
