= La Selva =

La Selva (Spanish for the jungle) may refer to:

- La Selva Beach, California
- La Selva Biological Station, in Costa Rica, one of the Organization for Tropical Studies research stations
- La Selva de Mar, a municipality in the comarca of the Alt Empordà in Catalonia, Spain
- La Selva del Camp, municipality in Tarragona, Spain
- La Selva, 1998 field recordings album by Francisco López

== People ==
- Anita La Selva, Canadian actress
- Roberto de la Selva (1895–1957), Mexican artist, brother of Salomón de la Selva
- Salomón de la Selva (1893–1959), Nicaraguan poet
- Vincent La Selva (1929–2017), American conductor

== See also ==
- Selva (disambiguation)
- Selva (comarca), a coastal comarca (county) in Catalonia, Spain
