= Aggie (film) =

- Official poster
- Directed by: Catherine Gund
- Produced by: Catherine Gund; Tanya Selvaratnam
- Cinematography: Catherine Gund; Rachel Lears; Karen Song
- Edited by: Gil Seltzer
- Music by: Jason Moran
- Production companies: Aubin Pictures; Just Films; Ford Foundation; Artemis Rising Foundation; Bloomberg Philanthropies; Sim; Robert Rauschenberg Foundation
- Distributed by: Strand Releasing
- Release dates: January 24, 2020 (Sundance); October 7, 2020 (United States)
- Running time: 92 minutes
- Country: United States
- Language: English

Aggie is a 2020 American documentary film, directed and produced by Catherine Gund. The film follows the story of art collector Agnes Gund, exploring the nexus of art, race, and justice.

The film had its world premiere at the Sundance Film Festival on January 24, 2020. It was released on October 7, 2020, by Strand Releasing.

== Synopsis ==
Aggie looks at the upbringing and career of collector and philanthropist Agnes "Aggie" Gund, focusing on when she sold a painting from her collection to fund criminal-justice reform. Roy Lichtenstein's Masterpiece sold for $165 million and Aggie's nonprofit initiative—the Art for Justice Fund—was born, bridging “blue chip” art and serving the common good. Ava DuVernay, Bryan Stevenson, Thelma Golden, John Waters, Glenn Ligon, Jamie Bennett, Abigail Disney, Teresita Fernández and Marina Abramović appear in the film.

== Release ==
The film had its world premiere at the Sundance Film Festival on January 24, 2020. In May 2020, Strand Releasing acquired U.S. distribution rights to the film. It was released on October 7, 2020.

== Critical reception ==
Aggie holds a 75% approval rating on review aggregator website Rotten Tomatoes, based on eight reviews, with an average of 6.8/10. On Metacritic, the film holds a rating of 57 out of 4 reviews, indicating "mixed or average" reviews.

Ordoga of the Los Angeles Times writes that "Aggie is a well-made portrait of an admirable woman."
