= Grotto Calgeron =

Natural cavity in Italy

Coordinates: 46.0074°N 11.6193°E

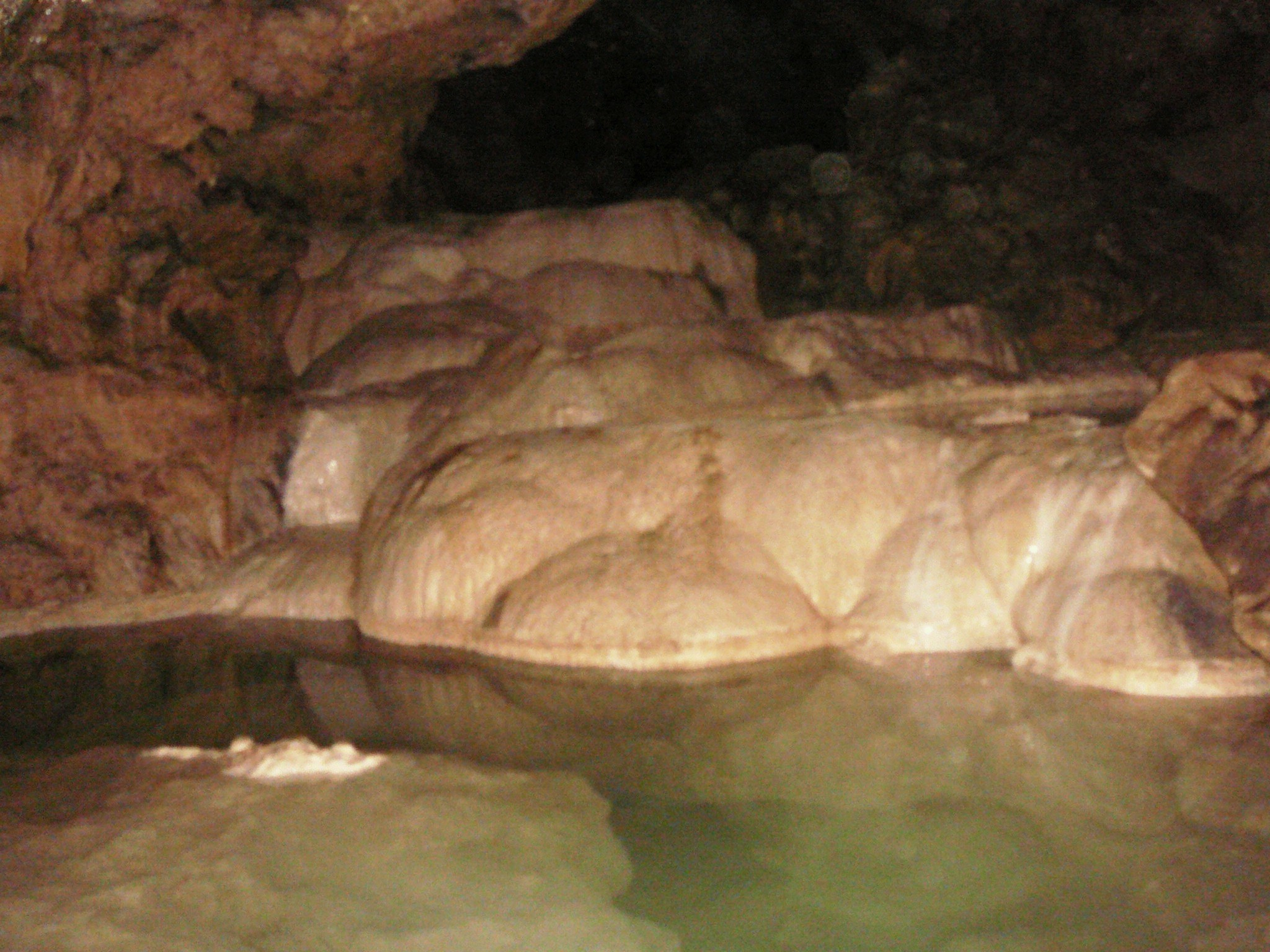
- Interactive map of Grotto Calgeron
- Location: Italy
- Entrances: 1

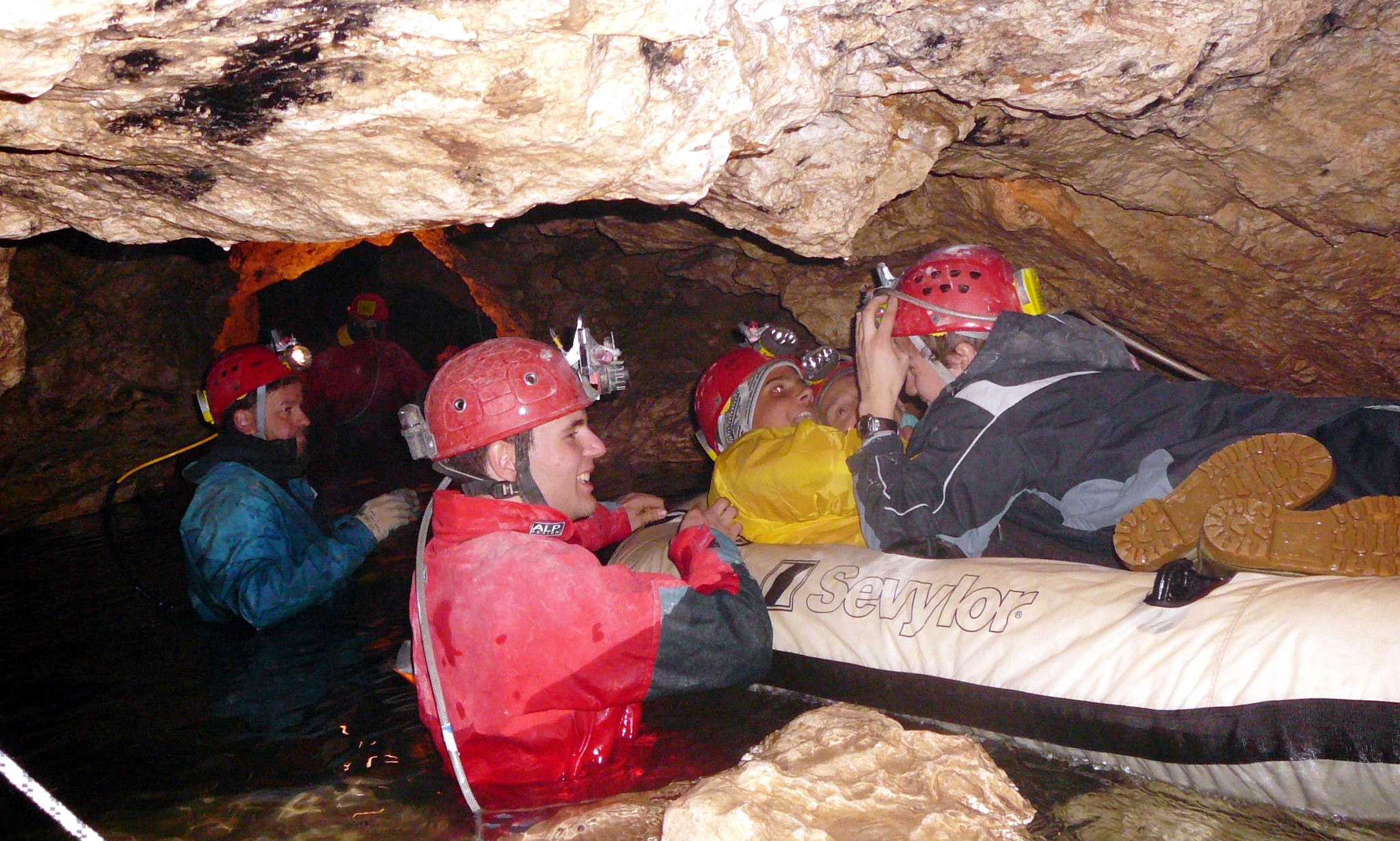
The entrance to the cave with the aid of an inflatable boat

Grotto Calgeron (cave of Calgeron), also known as the GB Trener cave, is a natural cavity that is located near the village of Grigno in Valsugana in Trentino.

== Location ==
Access to the cave is on the right side slope of the Brenta River, near Selva (Grigno), in Valsugana. Once you reach Grigno, you cross the river, turning right, and there is parking where you begin the path leading to the opening. From the parking area you take a path that initially rises, and then crosses the mountain; in just over 30 minutes it was at the entrance of the cavity (470m above sea level).

The entrance is sometimes inaccessible, since the water level sometimes ends up closing both the main entrance.

== The Cavity ==
The cave has a development of 3,600 meters (mostly horizontal), of which only the first 2 kilometers can be visited throughout the year; The rest of the cave is accessible only in periods of greatest drought and only to experienced and equipped staff.

The cavity counts several caves, dug in the dolomite, with 11 ponds and a series of candle concretation stairs at the entrance of the cave. The cave has a depth of between + 250 and -130 m (380 meters in total).

Among the wonders of this cave is a cave of 80 meters long, and a lake (the seventh: the "Pasa lake"), with a depth of 4 meters and a length of 40.

Probably this cave is connected to the well-known Grotto of Bigonda, which is not far away. Together, the two cavities would form a large cavity complex.

A layer of white clay lying in the cavity can suggest that the cave refers to the Riss glaciation, or 250,000 years ago.

The cave has some areas that have been given a name for their peculiarities:

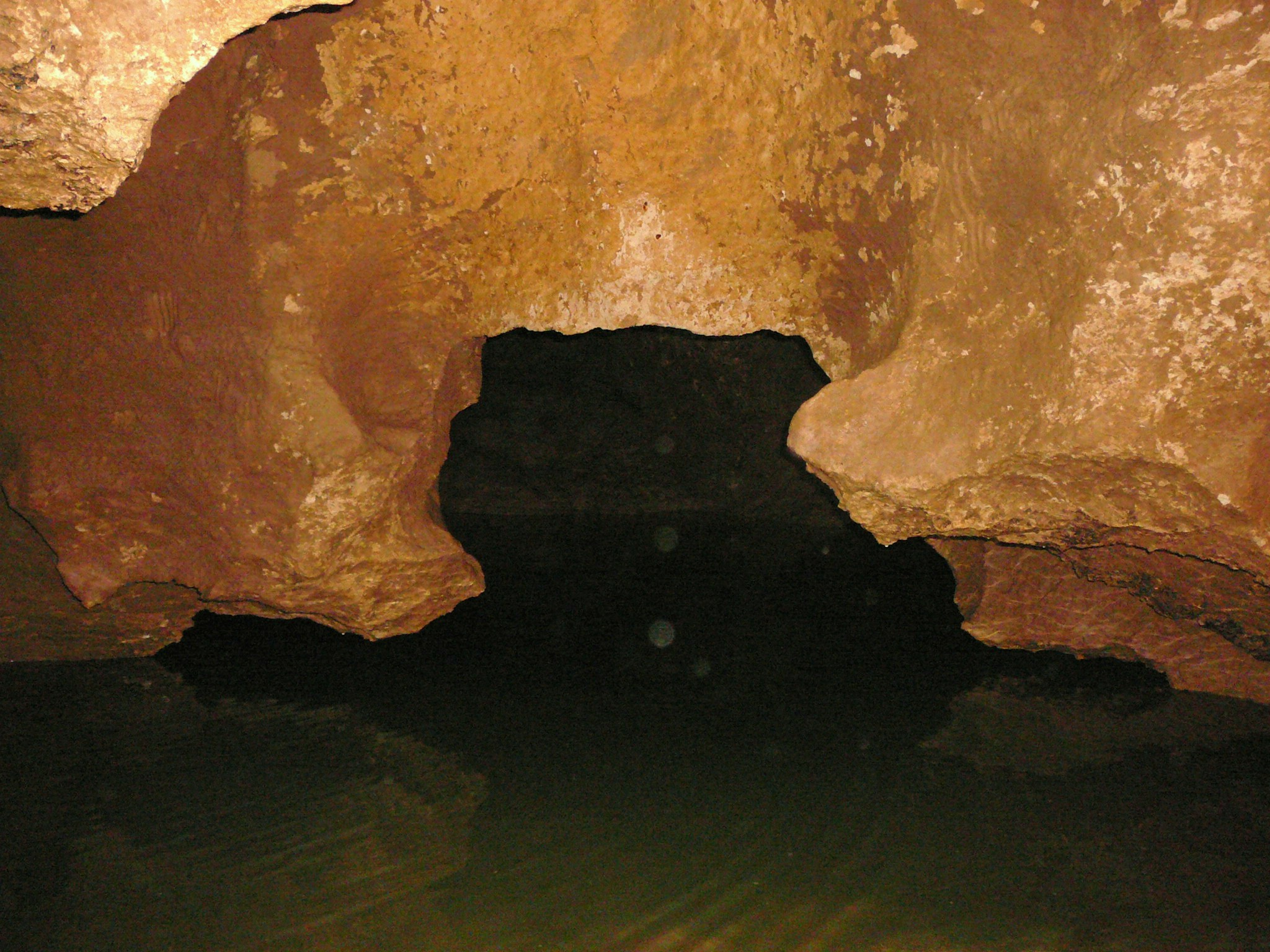
- The lake Pasa, one of the largest lakes in the cave
  the "mud branch", a blind branch of 150 m, where as the name suggests, it gets dirty to walk it
- the "labyrinth or swallow" spiral section forming a small labyrinth
- the "descent on the sand", a downhill walkway of about fifty feet that can be traveled by slipping into the sand
- the "black room" has a broad descending section with very dark stone
- the "tall branch" with entrance above the vault of the cave, reachable only with a ladder
- the "bathtub room" at the beginning of the cavity and characterized by planets of concaved tanks
- the "siphon of the echoes" term of the upper branch with a small aperture where you can hear an echo from the continuation of the cavity when shouting within it.

== Notes ==
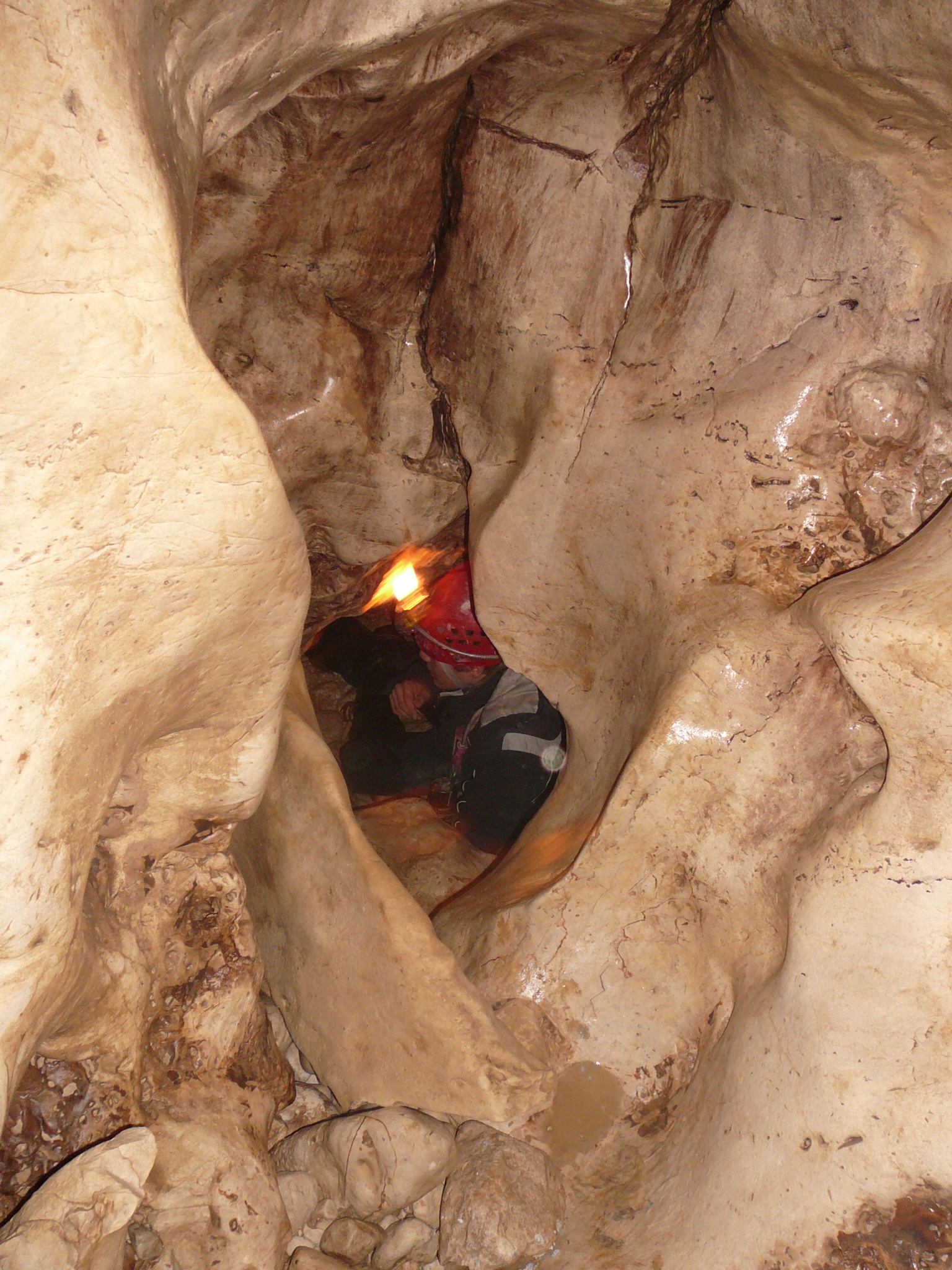
- One of the many narrow steps
  On 23 February 1997, two Venetian tourists were rescued when they could not find the exit of the cave.
- Entry to the cave is always possible, as usually the gate is never closed; however, it is advisable not to go without a guide.
- Immediately after the entrance gate, there are usually 1 or 2 ponds, which can be overcome preferably with the use of a small canoe, so as not to get wet immediately, or use a wet suit.

== Sources ==
- Paolo Zambotto, The "gourds": particular morphologies in the caves of Sporminore and Calgeron, Trento. - V. 39 (1988), n. 3/4; p. 31-34.
- Bruno Angelini, The SAT in the caves: the speleological groups of the SAT sections in the research and study of a fascinating world, in: Bulletin / Company tridentini mountaineers. - Trento. - A. 48 (1985), n. 1; p. 39-40.
