= Selva =

Selva may refer to:

== People ==
- Selva (surname)
- Selva (name)
- Selva (actor), Indian actor
- Selvaa (director), Indian director

== Places ==
- Selva (comarca), a coastal comarca (county) in Catalonia, Spain
- Selva, Mallorca (pop. 3,055), a municipality on Mallorca in the Balearic Islands, Spain
- Sëlva (aka Wolkenstein), a commune in South Tyrol, Italy
- Selva dei Molini, Italian name for Mühlwald, a commune in South Tyrol, Italy
- Selva di Cadore, a commune in the province of Belluno, Italy
- Selva, Grigno, a frazione in the province of Trento, Italy
- Selva di Progno, a commune in the province of Verona, Italy
- Selva, one of the 17 Contrade of Siena in Tuscany, Italy
- Selva, Santiago del Estero, a town in the Santiago del Estero Province, Argentina
- Selva, Ardabil, a village in Iran
- Selva, Peru, a natural preserve in Peru
- Selva, Santa Fiora, a village in the province of Grosseto, Italy

== Other uses ==
- Selvaa, a 1996 Indian Tamil-language film
- "Selva", a song by Camel, from the 1982 album The Single Factor
