= La Llorona (disambiguation) =

La Llorona ('The Weeping Woman' or 'the Cryer') is an oral legend in Latin American folklore.

La Llorona may also refer to:

== Film ==
- La Llorona (1933 film), a Mexican film based on the legend
- La Llorona (1960 film), a Mexican film based on the legend
- La Llorona (2019 film), a Guatemalan film

== Music ==
- "La Llorona" (song), a Mexican folk song covered by many artists
- La Llorona (Chavela Vargas album), 1994
- La Llorona (Lhasa de Sela album), 1997

== Other uses ==
- "La Llorona" (Grimm), a 2012 episode of the TV series

== See also ==
- Weeping Woman (disambiguation)
- The Woman in White (disambiguation)
- La maldición de la llorona, a 1961 Mexican horror film
- La leyenda de la Llorona, a 2011 Mexican animated film
- The Curse of La Llorona, a 2019 American horror film
- The Legend of La Llorona, a 2022 American horror film
- The Revenge of La Llorona, an upcoming American horror film
