= Juan del Valle =

Juan del Valle may refer to:

- Juan del Valle y Caviedes (1645–1698), Colonial poet from Viceregal Peru
- Juan Carlos del Valle (born 1975), Mexican realist painter
- Juan Valle (died 1563), also known as Juan del Valle, Roman Catholic prelate who served as the first Bishop of Popayán
