= Chavela at Carnegie Hall =

Live album by Chavela Vargas
- Released: 2004
- Recorded: 2003
- Venue: Carnegie Hall
- Length: 1:13:56

Chavela at Carnegie Hall, also known as Chavela Live at Carnegie Hall, and En Carnegie Hall in Spanish, is a live album by Mexican singer Chavela Vargas. It was recorded live at Carnegie Hall in New York City on September 15, 2003. In 2019, it was selected by Mitú as one of the Spanish-Language Albums that "Changed The Face And Feel Of The Music Industry". Graphic designer Rafael Esquer of Alfalfa Studio created the special collector's edition of the CD packaging with a custom foil-embossed double cover and a 20-page book of his original illustrations.

== Track listing ==
1. Macorina
2. Un Mundo Raro
3. Sombras
4. Se Me Hizo Facil
5. Soledad
6. Cruz de Olvido
7. El Andariego
8. Vamonos
9. La Noche de Mi Amor
10. Las Simples Cosas
11. Luz de Luna
12. Si No Te Vas
13. La Llorona
14. En el Ultimo Trago
15. Volver, Volver
16. La Churrasca
17. Hacia La Vida
18. Introduction by Salma Hayek and Elliot Goldenthal
