= Catherine Gund =

Australian-American film director

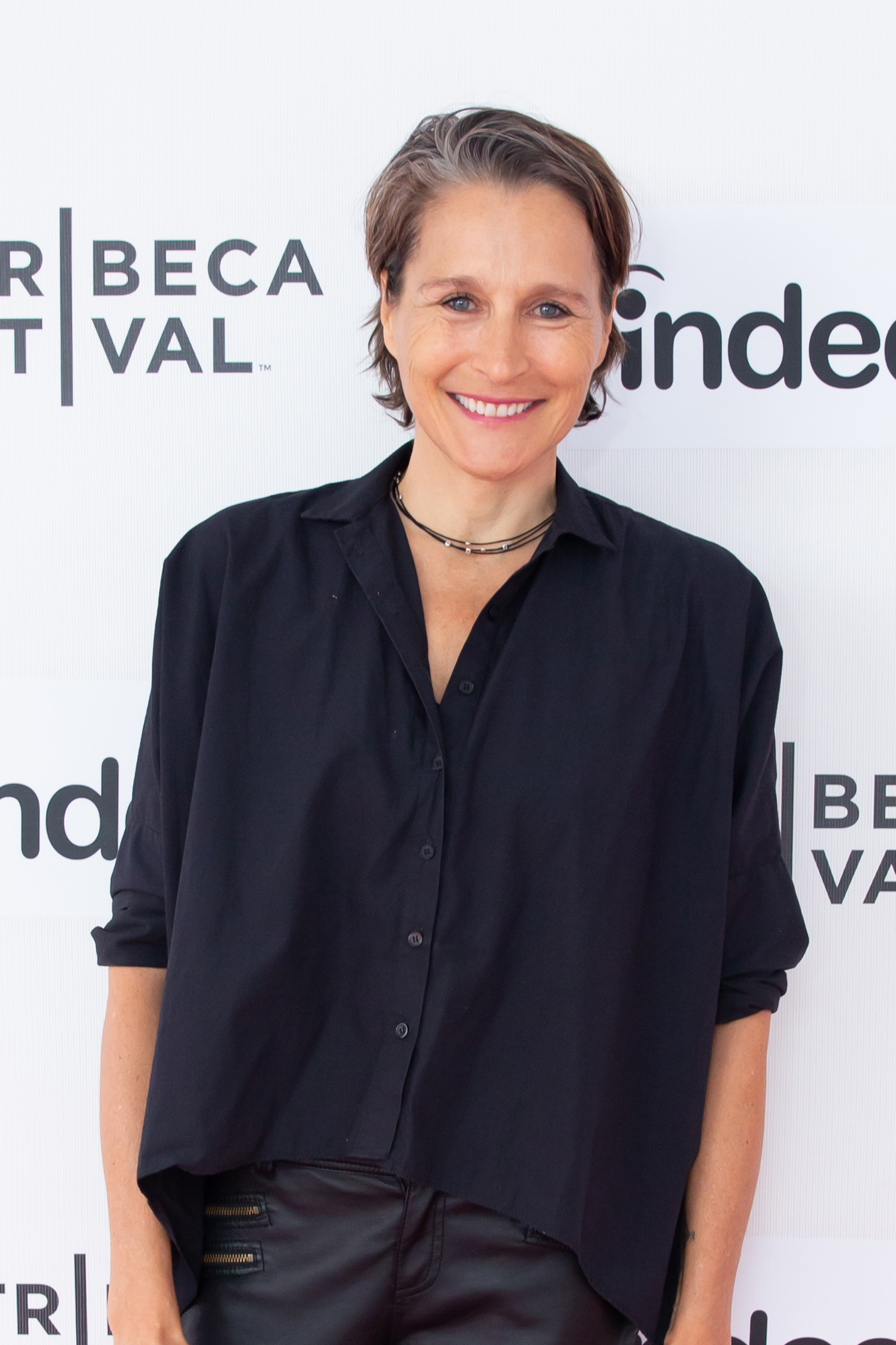
- Catherine Gund at the Tribeca Film Festival in New York City.
- Born: Catherine Gund Saalfield; 1965 (age 60–61); Geelong, Australia
- Education: Brown University
- Known for: film production, directing, writing, activism

Catherine Gund (born Catherine Gund Saalfield in 1965) is an American producer, director, and writer who founded Aubin Pictures in 1996.

Gund's films have screened around the world in festivals, theaters, museums, and schools; on PBS, HBO, Paramount+/MTV Documentary Films, and the Discovery Channel, Sundance Channel, Netflix, and Amazon Prime. She is a voting member of the Academy of Motion Picture Arts and Sciences.

== Early life ==
Catherine Gund was born in Geelong, Australia but grew up in Ohio. She is the daughter of the late billionairess philanthropist Agnes Gund (1938-2025) and her first husband, Albrecht "Brec" Saalfield. She attended Brown University and received a dual degree in Art/Semiotics and Women's Studies, and was a member of Phi Beta Kappa.

== Career ==
Upon graduation, Gund moved to New York City to do the Whitney Independent Study Program and joined ACT UP. She co-founded DIVA TV (Damned Interfering Video Activist Television), the AIDS activist video collective affiliated with ACT UP/NY whose productions included Target City Hall, Pride '69-'89, Like a Prayer, and Stop the Church. During this time, she also became involved with Paper Tiger Television, a collectively produced weekly public access show, and contributed to shows from 1987-1994. Much of her early video work from this time is held at the New York Public Library as a part of their AIDS Activist Videotape Collection.

Gund's early activist video work focused on AIDS activism and the LGBTQ+ community. Her work in the early 1990s included Bleach, Teach, and Outreach (1989, co-produced with Ray Navarro) to document the emergence of a city-sponsored needle exchange program to combat the spread of HIV; Keep Your Laws Off My Body (1990, co-produced with Zoe Leonard) about censorship and legislation against privacy and lesbian bodies; Among Good Christian Peoples (1991, co-produced with Jacqueline Woodson) based on Woodson’s humorous essay about growing up as a Black lesbian Jehovah’s Witness; I’m You, You’re Me: Women Surviving Prison Living with AIDS (1992, co-produced with Debbie Levine); Sacred Lies, Civil Truths (1993, co-produced with Cyrille Phipps) documented the Religious Right and its broad-based agenda, analyzes their campaigns for anti-gay initiatives in Oregon and Colorado in 1992, also examining issues of family and religion in lesbian and gay communities; Not Just Passing Through (1994, co-produced with Polly Thistlethwaite, Dolores Perez, and Jean Carlomusto) a four-part documentary about constructions of lesbian history, community and culture; Cuz It's A Boy (1994, about the murder of Brandon Teena); Positive: Life with HIV (1993-95, senior associate producer & segment producer) AIDSFILMS’ four hour series about HIV/AIDS targeted at the HIV community covering political, psycho-social, cultural, medical and legal issues of living with HIV/AIDS.

In 1996, Gund founded Aubin Pictures, a nonprofit documentary film company with scholar and activist Scot Nakagawa. She produced Aubin's first film, When Democracy Works (1996), that same year, in a three-part focus on stories of multi-issue organizing. Three years later, she produced and directed the feature documentary Hallelujah! Ron Athey: A Story of Deliverance (1998) about controversial performance artist Ron Athey, and co-directed Object Lessons (1999) along with Catherine Lord, about a gallery exhibition and lesbian visibility, community, culture, and identity. In 2000 she produced On Hostile Ground, a documentary about three abortion providers working in the USA. It was broadcast on the Sundance Channel.

In 2004, she produced Making Grace, documenting the journey of a lesbian couple having a baby together. Gund's documentary, A Touch of Greatness (2004), about the revolutionary teaching practices of elementary school teacher Albert Cullum, was nominated for a News and Documentary Emmy. The film also won Best Documentary award at Hamptons International Film Festival in 2004.

She produced Motherland Afghanistan in 2006 about an OB/GYN struggling to make a difference in his homeland of Afghanistan, first at Kabul's renamed Laura Bush Maternity Ward and then in an isolated provincial hospital where patients often travel for several days to get treatment. Broadcast on PBS/Independent Lens.

In 2009, Gund produced and directed a segment for Sesame Street called Rhyme Time (2009) with poet Idris Goodwin about kids and healthy eating. What's On Your Plate? (2009), a documentary directed by Gund and two eleven-year-old girls about healthy, sustainable eating from a kid's perspective, premiered at the Berlin International Film Festival and was featured in the Discovery Channel's Planet Green. Chavela (2017) follows the life and legend of lesbian Mexican ranchera chanteuse Chavela Vargas. Dispatches from Cleveland (2017) about how communities in Cleveland united to fight for justice in the face of police violence after the death of Tamir Rice.

Aggie (2020) is a feature-length documentary about her mother, art collector Agnes "Aggie" Gund, and her sale of a Roy Lichtenstein painting to invest in the Art for Justice Fund. The film premiered at the Sundance Film Festival in 2020 and was released theatrically in October 2020. Gund produced America (2018), a short film directed by Garrett Bradley. Gund produced Primera (2021) for HBO about parents who became activists for Chile's path to a new constitution.

She also produced Angola Do You Hear Us? Voices from a Plantation Prison (2022) (formerly A Peculiar Silence), a short film directed by Cinque Northern about Liza Jessie Peterson's shutdown 2020 performance of her play The Peculiar Patriot at the Louisiana State Penitentiary, Angola.

Her archival footage has been shown in TV shows and films, including How to Survive a Plague, United in Anger: A History of ACT UP, the 2012 documentary Koch, VICE Special Report: Countdown to Zero, Fauci (2022), Cured (2020), and Larry Kramer in Love and Anger (2015).

Gund serves on the boards of Art For Justice Fund, Art Matters, and is the Chair of The George Gund Foundation. She was the founder and a founding board member of JustMedia. She was a founding board member of Baldwin for the Arts and serves on their advisory board. She also co-founded the Third Wave Foundation, an organization that resources youth-led, intersectional, gender justice movements. She was the founding director of BENT TV, the video workshop for LGBTQI youth, and was on the founding boards of Iris House, Working Films, Reality Dance Company, and The Sister Fund. Previously, Gund served on the boards of Bard Early Colleges, Osa Conservation, MediaRights.org, The Robeson Fund of the Funding Exchange, The Vera List Center for Art and Politics at the New School, and the Astraea Foundation.

== Personal life ==
In college Gund came out as a lesbian.

== Filmography ==
=== As director and producer ===
- Paint Me a Road out of Here (2024)
- Meanwhile (2024)
- Dispatches from Cleveland" (2017)
- Chavela (2017)
- BORN TO FLY: Elizabeth Streb vs. Gravity (2014)
- What's On Your Plate? (2009)
- Sesame Street: Rhyme Time (2009)
- Making Grace (2004)
- Object Lessons (1999)
- Hallelujah! Ron Athey: A Story of Deliverance (1998) – also camera
- Not Just Passing Through (1994)
- B.U.C.K.L.E. (1993)
- Cuz It's Boy (1994)
- When Democracy Works (1996)
- Sacred Lies, Civil Truths (1993)
- I’m You, You’re Me: Women Surviving Prison Living with AIDS (1992)
- Among Good Christian Peoples (1991)
- Keep Your Laws Off My Body (1990)
- Bleach, Teach, and Outreach (1989)
- AIDS Activist Videotape Collection (1987–1992)

=== As producer ===
- Angola Do You Hear Us? Voices From a Plantation Prison (2022)
- Primera (2021)
- America (2019)
- Motherland Afghanistan (2006)
- A Touch of Greatness (2004)
- On Hostile Ground (2000)
- Positive: Life with HIV (1993–1995) – senior associate producer and segment producer
- Western Artists/African Art: The Artists Speak (1994)
- Ends and Means (1990)

=== As director ===
- Aggie (2020)

=== other ===
- Paper Tiger Television (1988) – also сontributor

== Awards ==
- Gracie Award, Alliance for Women in Media, 2023
- Breakthrough Award (nominee), Chicken and Egg Pictures, 2021, 2018
- Visual AIDS Vanguard Award, VAVA Voom, 2021
- Joan Shaw Herman Award for Distinguished Service, Concord Academy, 2017
- Educational Video Center Honoree, 2016
- John Dewey Award for Distinguished Public Service - Bard College, 2016
- Vision Award - New York Women's Foundation, 2015
- Cleveland Film Festival (CIFF) Someone to Watch Award, 2005

== Selected bibliography ==
- "Countering Philanthropic Fragility with Philanthropic Collaboration," Inside Philanthropy, 9 September 2021.
- "Words of Art," (visual arts card game) Penguin Random House, 13 April 2021.
- "Ruth Bader Ginsburg led by engaging others to act," Cleveland.com, 16 October 2020.
- "No Object Is More Important Than People, Artists, Community and Love": Catherine Gund | Aggie, Filmmaker, 24 January 2020.
- "3 Reflections on Cinema and Archives," (Vision & Justice Online) Aperture, Summer 2016.
- "There are Many Ways to Say Hallelujah" in Pleading in the Blood: The Art and Performances of Ron Athey (2013)
- "What’s On Your Plate? Kids And Their Families Talk About What They Eat, Where It Comes From and Why That Matters," with Mary Jeys and Cassie Wagler (2011)
- "The Education of Young Donors is a Two-Way Street," in "The Chronicle of Philanthropy" (1999)
- "To April Martin," in Letters of Intent: Women Cross the Generations to Talk about Family, Work, Sex, Love and The Future of Feminism, eds. Anna Bondoc and Meg Daily, The Free Press, 1999.
- Interview with Amber Hollibaugh and Gini Reticker on P.O.V. distribution of Women and Children Last, in High Impact Television, The Center for Strategic Communications, 1998.
- "Lucky," with Scot Nakagawa in Queerly Classed, ed. Susan Raffo (1997)
- "Memorials" in Encyclopedia of AIDS: A Social, Political, Cultural, and Scientific Record of the Epidemic, ed. Raymond A. Smith (1997)
- "Till Death Do Us Part" in Generation Q: Inheriting Stonewall, eds. Seth Silberman and Robin Bernstein (1996)
- “November 1995” in XXXFruit, Summer 1996.
- “Give Me My Dyke TV,” in Out in All Directions: The Almanac of Gay and Lesbian America, eds. Lynn Witt, Eric Marcus and Sherry Thomas, Warner Books, 1995.
- “AIDS Videography,” in AIDS TV, by Alexandra Juhasz, Duke, 1995.
- “You are doing here for us,” photo collage with Hanna Crespo, student at the Harvey Milk School, in XXXFruit, premiere issue: Witness: An Exquisite Corpse, Summer 1995.
- “Follow the Leaders... Not the (AIDS) Czar,” feature article about Kristine Gebbie, Clinton’s former National AIDS Policy Coordinator, for MS. Magazine July 1994, unpublished due to Gebbie’s resignation.
- “Coming to Safer Sex,” On Our Backs, a Blush Productions Publication, Jan-Feb 1994, (reprinted in Lesbian AIDS Project LAP Notes bulletin, May 1994).
- “On the Make: Activist Video Collectives NYC, 1990,” in Queer Looks, eds. Pratibha Parmar, John Greyson, Martha Gever, Routledge, 1993.
- “Jacqueline Woodson,” in Contemporary Lesbian Writers of the United States: A Bio-Bibliographical Critical Sourcebook, eds. Denise Knight, Sandra Pollack, 1993.
- "Lesbian Marriage... (K)not!" in Sisters, Sexperts, Queers: Beyond the Lesbian Nation, ed. Arlene Stein, Plume (1993, reprinted from OUTWEEK #13, 1989)
- "Shocking Pink Praxis: Race and Gender on the ACT UP Frontlines," with Ray Navarro, in Inside/Out: Lesbian Theories, Gay Theories, ed. Diana Fuss (1991)
- Women, AIDS and Activism, The ACT UP Women’s Book Collective (co-author) (1990)
- Contributing Editor of The Independent Film and Video Monthly (1992-1996); Contributing Writer for On Our Backs (1994). Articles have also appeared in The Advocate, Outweek, NYQ, The Guardian, Lies of Our Times, The Chronicle of Philanthropy.
