= NYC311 =

New York City government information and services call center

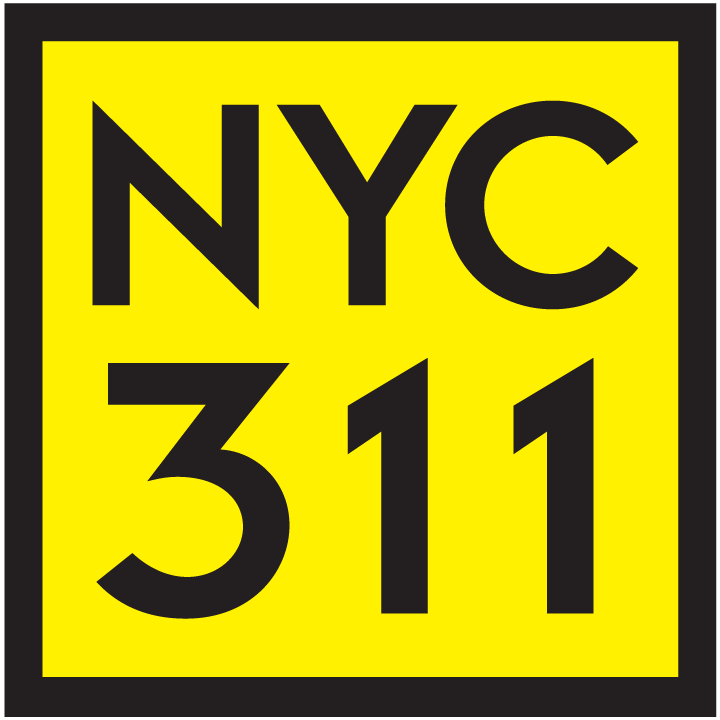
- Founded: March 2003; 22 years ago
- Founder: Michael Bloomberg (Mayor)
- Type: Government service
- Headquarters: New York City, New York, U.S.
- Services: Non-emergency government information and services
- Parent organization: New York City Department of Information Technology and Telecommunications
- Website: www.nyc.gov/311

NYC311 is a comprehensive government information and services call center launched in 2003 by then-New York City Mayor Michael Bloomberg. It consolidates all city government and service lines into one number, allowing residents to reach any city government office or service with two phone numbers: 311 for non-emergencies and 911 for emergencies.

== Overview ==
Before 2003, phone numbers for New York City's government offices and service agencies were listed in the city phone book, accounting for more than 4,000 entries across 11 pages. Calls were fielded by more than 40 city agency call centers and hotlines.

Through 2023, NYC311 received more than 525 million inquiries from New York residents: 68% by phone, 28% through the NYC311 website, 3% through the NYC311 mobile app, and 1% through other available channels.

== Branding and logo ==
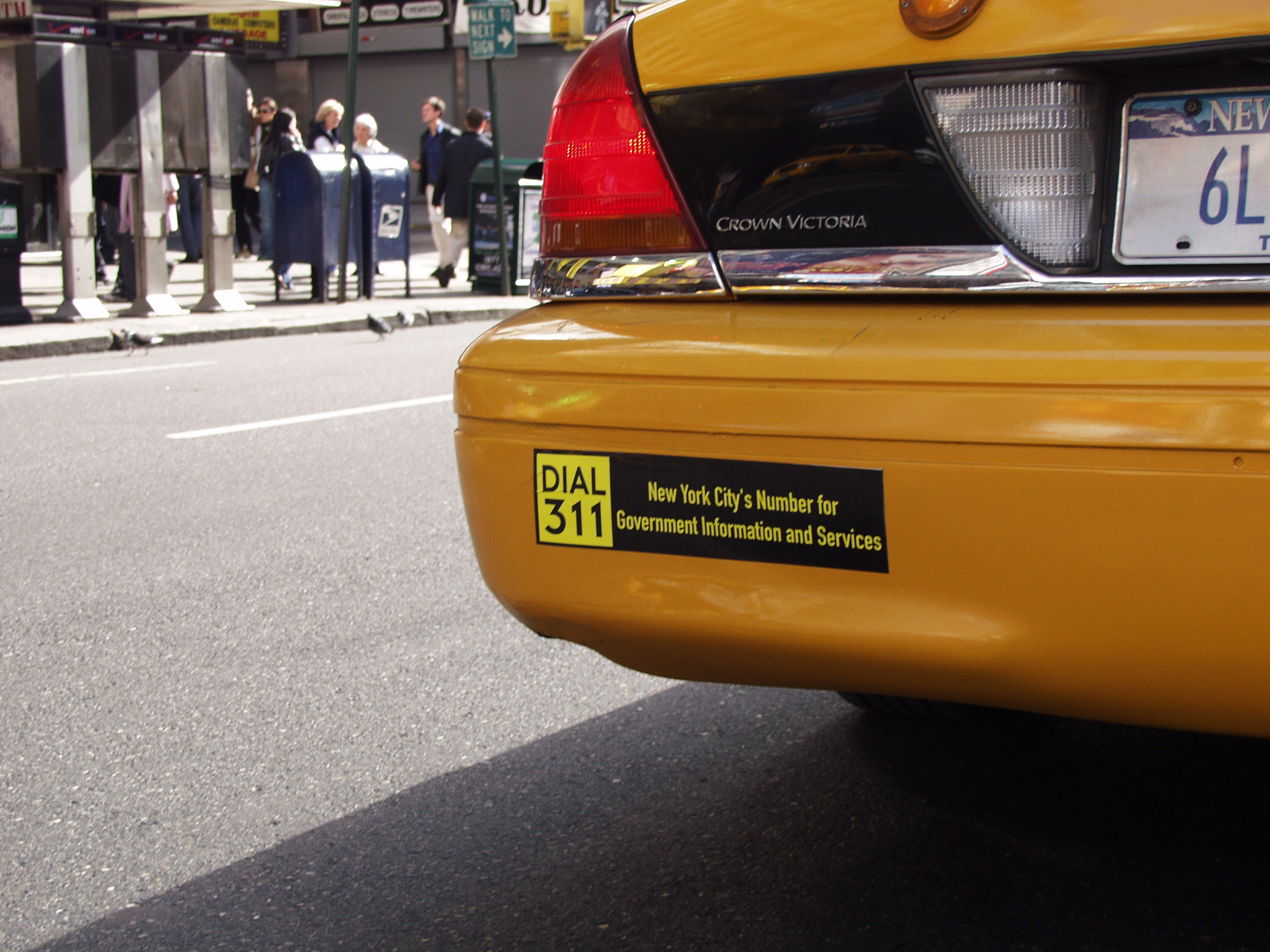
DIAL 311 bumper sticker on a New York City taxi.

The NYC311 logo, designed in 2002 by Rafael Esquer of RadicalMedia, features a bold black “DIAL 311” on a yellow square. Esquer aimed for a design that was “simple, immediate, and visually memorable,” suitable for New York’s multilingual population. The logo appears on taxi tops, bus shelters, and public service announcements. The logo received the Gold Award in the 2004 **Graphis Logo Design 6** competition and contributed to RadicalMedia’s 2004 National Design Award for Communication Design from the Cooper Hewitt, Smithsonian Design Museum.
