= Selva (surname) =

Selva is a surname. It is also an Indian given name or surname. It may refer to:

- Alberto Selva (born 1964), Sammarinese politician, former Captain Regent of San Marino
- Andy Selva (born 1976), Sammarinese football player
- Antonio Selva (1824–1889), Italian operatic bass
- Esther Sanz Selva (born 1985), Spanish politician
- Gustavo Selva (1926–2015), Italian politician
- Paul J. Selva (born 1958), American military officer
- Steven Selva (born 1948), American biologist
- Vincent Selva, film director and screenwriter
- Vladimiro Selva (born 1970), Sammarinese politician

== See also ==
- Selva (disambiguation)
- Selva (name)
