= Alicia Elena Pérez Duarte =

Mexican lawyer and academic (born 1953)

Alicia Elena Pérez Duarte y Noroña
- Born: 15 May 1953 (age 72); Ocotlán, Jalisco, Mexico
- Other names: Alicia Pérez Duarte
- Occupations: lawyer, academic

Alicia Elena Pérez Duarte (born 15 May 1953) is a Mexican lawyer and researcher who focuses on human rights and women's legal status. She is a member of the Sistema Nacional de Investigadores (National System of Researchers) and a co-founder of the Programa Universitario de Estudios de Género (PUEG, University Program for Gender Studies) at the National Autonomous University of Mexico (UNAM). In addition to her work in private legal practice, she has served as a magistrate for the Superior Tribunal of Mexico City, as technical secretary for the Commission investigating femicides in Ciudad Juárez, and as a special prosecutor for crimes against women.

== Early life and education ==
Alicia Elena Pérez Duarte was born 15 May 1953 in Ocotlán, Jalisco. From a young age, she defied conventions which required her to wear dresses and though she took ballet, she quit as a teenager to work in secret so she could have her own money. Her family were well-off and lived abroad for part of her childhood, but her parents divorced when she was thirteen. Pérez Duarte completed middle and high school in a convent school in Jalisco. After she graduated in 1972, she enrolled at the National Autonomous University of Mexico (Spanish: Universidad Nacional Autónoma de México, UNAM) to study law. She completed both her licentiate (1977) and master's degree (1981) with distinction, earning the Medalla Gabino Barreda for her academic merit. She completed her Doctor of Law in 1988 at the UNAM and went on to complete her specialist designation in human rights at the Inter-American Institute of Human Rights in Costa Rica in 1989.

== Career ==
Pérez Duarte opened her own legal firm in 1977 and mainly dealt with clients in civil cases and family law. In 1983, she was also hired to work in the Instituto de Investigaciones Jurídica (Legal Research Institute) of the UNAM. In addition to her private practice, Pérez Duarte taught general law at the Colegio Montaignac preparatory school, legal theory and practices at the Universidad Intercontinental, and civil law at the UNAM. In 1988, she was contacted by a friend to become the legal representative of Chavela Vargas, an iconic singer who was an alcoholic and was in danger of being swindled by her record label. Pérez became Vargas' legal representative from that time until her death and the two had a romantic relationship that lasted for almost a decade. The two women lived together for four of those years with Pérez Duarte's two children.

In 1992, along with other feminist scholars, Pérez Duarte founded the Programa Universitario de Estudios de Género (PUEG, University Program for Gender Studies) at the National Autonomous University of Mexico. That year, she was also appointed to serve as the legal director of public services for civil and family matters in the Attorney General's office. In 1993, she was appointed as the Numerary Magistrate of the Supreme Tribunal of Justice of the Federal District. During her tenure, she was active in the fight against femicide and violence against women. Her activism led to appointments as Mexico's delegate to the Pan American Health Organization, the United Nations Development Programme, the World Organisation Against Torture, as well as other international and multi-national organizations striving for equality and the right to live violence-free.

Peréz Duarte was appointed to serve as the technical secretary of the Senate Monitoring Commission for femicides in Ciudad Juárez between 2003 and 2005. In 2006 became the special prosecutor for crimes and acts of violence toward women. Among the cases investigated were the allegations of kidnapping and torture of Lydia Cacho in Cancún; a child pornography ring that was operating in Cancún, Chihuahua, Mexicali, and Tijuana; and the rape by police on a group of women in San Salvador Atenco. After serving twenty-two months, she resigned from the post because of bureaucratic delays and politically motivated exonerations or dismissals. Resigning from public service, Peréz returned to the UNAM in 2008 and was appointed as the Leandro Azuara Pérez Chair in the law faculty.

== Research ==
Pérez Duarte is a member of the Sistema Nacional de Investigadores (National System of Researchers). She has written numerous articles and books on the legal implications of gender on human rights. Many of her works, such as a series entitled Análisis comparativo de legislación local e internacional relativa a la mujer y a la niñez (Comparative Analysis of Local and International Legislation Related to Women and Children) written in conjunction with other authors for each Mexican state, were prepared for the National Commission of Human Rights and other public service organizations. Besides her written work, Pérez Duarte has presented more than three hundred conferences and seminars and participated in numerous round-table discussions nationally and internationally on human rights.

- Pérez Duarte y Noroña, Alicia Elena (1982). El derecho ante los problemas socioeconómicos de México: energéticos y alimentos [Socio-Economic Problems of Mexico before the Law: Energy and Food] (in Spanish) (1a ed.). Mexico City: Universidad Nacional Autónoma de México. OCLC 948931387.
- Pérez Duarte y Noroña, Alicia Elena (1990). Derecho de familia [Family Law] (in Spanish) (1a ed.). Mexico City: Universidad Nacional Autónoma de México, Instituto de Investigaciónes Jurídicas. ISBN 978-968-36-1737-8.
- Pérez Duarte y Noroña, Alicia Elena (1993). El aborto: una lectura de derecho comparado [Abortion: A Reading of Comparative Law] (in Spanish) (1a ed.). Mexico City: Universidad Nacional Autónoma de México. ISBN 978-968-36-3184-8.
- Pérez Duarte, Alicia Elena; Salinas Beristáin, Laura; Villalobos Schmidt, Patricia (1997). Análisis comparativo de legislación local e internacional relativa a la mujer y a la niñez: Distrito Federal [Comparative Analysis of Local and International Legislation Related to Women and Children: Federal District] (in Spanish). Mexico City: Comisión Nacional de Derechos Humanos. ISBN 978-970-644-107-2. Other locations such as Aguascalientes ISBN 978-970-644-099-0, Chiapas ISBN 978-970-644-103-4, Guanajuato ISBN 978-970-644-111-9, Michoacán ISBN 978-970-644-115-7, Veracruz ISBN 978-970-644-129-4 etc.
- Pérez Duarte y Noroña, Alicia Elena (1998). Panorama del derecho mexicano: Derecho de familia [Panorama of Mexican Law: Family Law] (in Spanish). Mexico City: McGraw Hill. ISBN 978-970-10-1783-8.
- Álvarez González, Rosa María; Pérez Duarte y N., Alicia Elena (2014). Aplicación práctica de los modelos de prevención, atención y sanción de la violencia de género contra las mujeres : protocolos de actuación [Practical Application of the Models of Prevention, Care and Punishment of Gender Violence against Women: Action Protocols] (in Spanish) (4a ed.). Mexico: Universidad Nacional Autónoma de México, Instituto de Investigaciones Jurídicas. ISBN 978-607-02-6314-9.
