= Weeping Woman =

Weeping Woman may refer to:

- La Llorona, a Latin American legend
  - La Llorona (2019 film), a Guatemalan film also known as The Weeping Woman
- The Weeping Woman, a 1937 painting by Pablo Picasso
- A Woman Weeping, a 1644 painting by Rembrandt or a student of his
- Weeping Woman and Mask of a Weeping Woman, 1885 sculptures by Auguste Rodin

== See also ==
- La Llorona (disambiguation)
- The Curse of La Llorona, a 2019 American film also known as The Curse of the Weeping Woman
