= Meanwhile (2024 film) =

Docu-poem, movie directed by Catherine Gund, documentary film

- Directed by: Catherine Gund
- Written by: Jacqueline Woodson
- Produced by: Catherine Gund; Erika Dilday
- Cinematography: Catherine Gund; Jia Li; Emerson Mahoney
- Edited by: M. Trevino
- Release dates: May 11, 2024 (Margaret Mead Film Festival); March 14, 2025 (United States)
- Running time: 88 minutes
- Countries: United States; Greece

Meanwhile is a 2024 docu-poem in six verses about artists. Jacqueline Woodson (text), Meshell Ndegeocello (soundscape), Erika Dilday (support), M. Trevino (structure), and Catherine Gund (direction), combine artists' expressions with historical and observational footage to create a piece about identity, race, racism, and resistance.

== Critical reception ==
"In Meanwhile, the director Catherine Gund fuses work from multidisciplinary artists, words from author Jacqueline Woodson, soundscapes by musician Meshell Ndegeocello, archival footage, and interviews to create an exploration of Black resilience. The film is described as a 'docu-poem,' using poetry-like juxtapositions and an intimate focus on breath as a central theme to reflect on the pain and joy of Black Americans, particularly in the wake of George Floyd’s death. It also looks at freedom as a continuous act of survival, suggesting that artists and activists generate breath and space for a community to thrive"

Christopher Campbell of Nonfics wrote, "This 'docu-poem' essay film is an essential experience right now, never mind that it’s meant to reflect the upheavals of 2020. It applies to the upheavals of 2025 just as well."

== Distribution ==
"Director Catherine Gund's documentary Meanwhile has been acquired by Abramorama for U.S. theatrical distribution. The film, described as a 'documentary poem,' delves into themes of race and creative resistance. Collaborating with novelist Jacqueline Woodson, composer Meshell Ndegeocello, and producer Erika Dilday, Gund has created a film that captures the complexity of contemporary life, which Abramorama CEO Karol Martesko-Fenster describes as 'museum-worthy' and compelling when viewed on the big screen. Meanwhile is set to premiere in New York on March 14, 2025, before expanding nationwide"
