= Making Grace (2004 movie) =

2004 Documentary about a lesbian couple becoming parents for the first time

- Directed by: Catherine Gund
- Produced by: Catherine Gund
- Cinematography: Catherine Gund; Claudia Raschke-Robinson
- Edited by: Aljernon Tunsil; Catherine Gund
- Music by: Paul Armstrong
- Release dates: June 6, 2004 (New Fest); June 22, 2005 (New York, NY)
- Running time: 87 minutes
- Country: United States
- Language: English

Making Grace is a 2004 documentary film that follows a lesbian couple as they navigate the experience of having a baby together.

== Synopsis ==
The film follows New York City lesbian couple Ann Krsul and Leslie Sullivan through the process of having a baby, including choosing a donor, fertility, lamaze classes, and sharing their news with family. It then shows the first few months of Grace's life.

Krsul was the biological mother via donor-conceived artificial insemination. Sullivan chose to be a stay-at-home mother while Krsul would continue working as an architect.

== Making ==
Making Grace is among the first films that share stories of lesbians who have created families during a time known as the "lesbian baby boom", and the first feature-length documentary following one lesbian couple during their journey of creating a family through donor conception, rather than retrospectively.

Director Catherine Gund used the movie to document the complexities of their journey bringing Grace into a world and an America that widely does not validate their love and their family.

== Follow-up film ==
In 2018 Grace Krsul-Sullivan, the child shown in Making Grace made a short film titled "My New Family Tree" about her experience growing up in her family, finding her donor siblings. In it she acknowledges her family's early contribution to the movement of LGBTQIA+ parents and families looking to make families through donor conception, as subjects of the documentary.

== Critical reception ==
The film had a positive reception overall. Jeanette Catsoulis for The New York Times said, "Making Grace is a small, intimate documentary that patiently observes the highs and lows of a 30-something couple who want to become parents. The story of Ann Krsul and Leslie Sullivan is quiet proof that families are indeed created, not mandated." and "doesn't rant against a legal system that forces Leslie to protect her parental rights by formally adopting Grace or berate the waiters in family restaurants who routinely ask the couple if they would like separate checks."

Dennis Harvey, writing for Variety stated that the movie "Serves nicely as a primer for lesbian partners considering the same leap."

The New York Post wrote that "The subject is touchy, but Gund handles it with taste and compassion."

Gena Hymowech, writing for AfterEllen.com stated that "[she thought] Gund did a good job. Her film is funny, heartwarming and full of insight... although Gund focused on some of the gay-related aspects of the story, that's not all the film's about. A great deal of the time, the documentary felt like it could be an exploration of any couple's pregnancy... In the case of Making Grace, that story is a very important one indeed." -

== Distribution ==
Making Grace was acquired by First Run Features. It premiered at New Fest in June 2004 and played multiple festivals following the premiere including; Cleveland International Film Festival 2005, Outfest 2005, Boston Gay & Lesbian Film/Video Festival, Museum of Fine Arts, Boston 2004, TAKES Dallas 2004, LGBT Film Festival, Minneapolis, MN 2004, Woodstock Film Festival 2004, Frameline 2004, Tokyo Gay & Lesbian Festival 2005, Green Film Festival in Seoul 2006, Rochester Gay and Lesbian Film & Video Festival (Image Out) 2004.

Making Grace was released theatrically in July 2005, premiering at Two Boots Pioneer Theater in New York, NY.

== See also ==
- Gayby Baby, 2015 documentary film
- Same-sex parenting
