= Rafael Esquer =

Mexican-American graphic designer (born 1966)

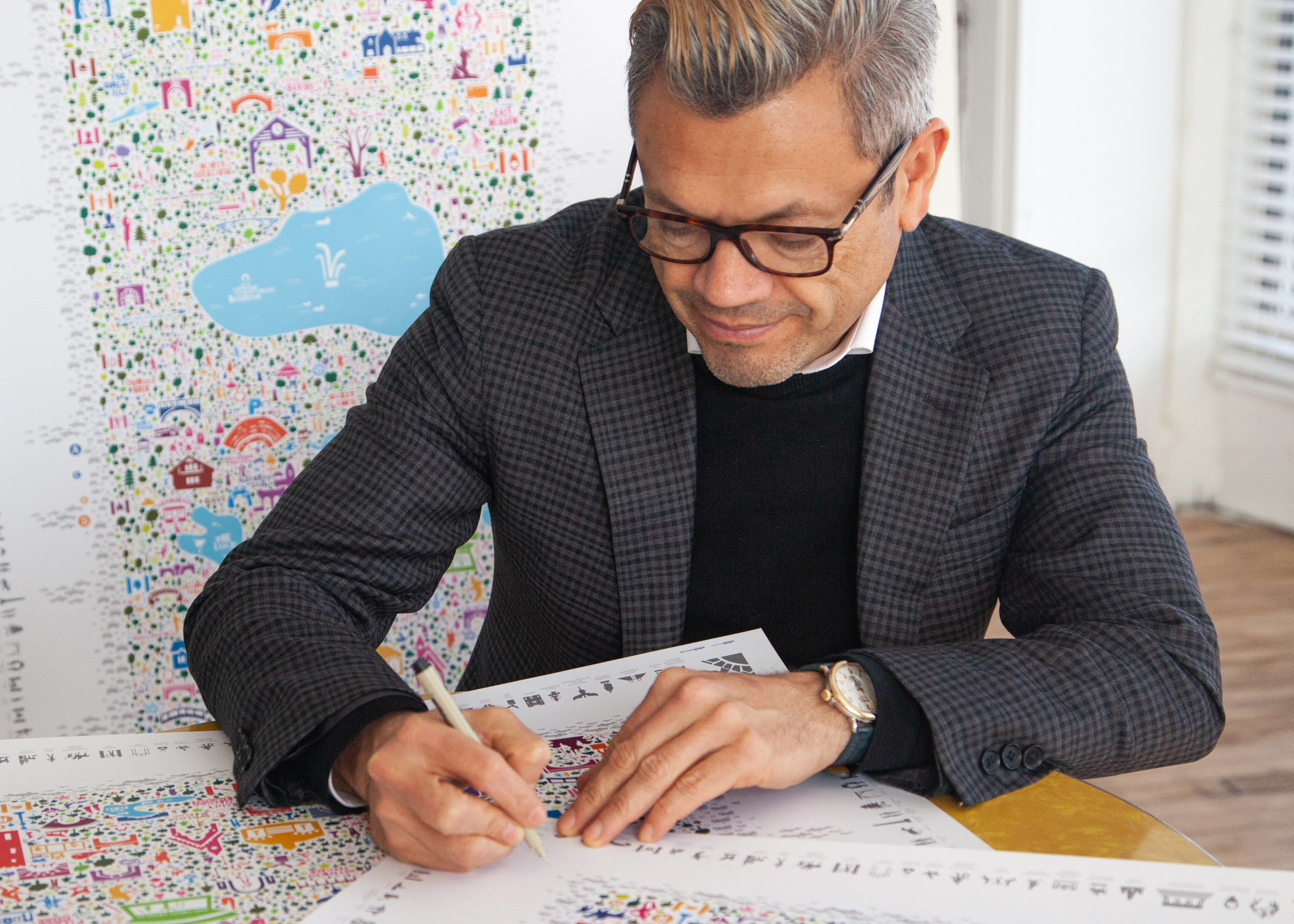
- Esquer at Alfalfa Studio in New York City, 2021
- Born: December 31, 1966 (age 59); Álamos, Sonora, Mexico
- Education: Art Center College of Design
- Website: www.alfalfastudio.com

Rafael Esquer (born 1966) is a Mexican-American graphic designer, branding expert, educator, yogi, and entrepreneur who is known for sports branding, logo design, and poster design. He is the founder and principal of Alfalfa Studio (a graphic design and branding firm) and Alfalfa New York (a lifestyle brand), both based in New York City.

== Early life and education ==
Esquer was born on December 31, 1966, in Álamos, Sonora, Mexico. His father was a teacher, and his mother was a cattle rancher. Until he was 8, his family lived in farming villages around Álamos where his father set up and ran elementary schools. In 1974, the family moved to Huatabampo, Sonora, a city of 70,000 people on the Gulf of California. Esquer completed elementary and high school there. At 19, he moved to Mexico City to study photography at the Coyocán School of Photography (1987–1988) and to begin his university education at the Universidad Autónoma Metropolitana (1988–1989). In 1989, Esquer took a break from his studies in Mexico City to learn English in Los Angeles, California. He enrolled at Los Angeles Trade–Technical College (LATTC) and in 1992 received his Associate of Arts with honors in Commercial Art. He did not return to Mexico City. Instead, with encouragement from his professors at LATTC, he applied to Art Center College of Design in Pasadena, California, where he was accepted and awarded a scholarship to continue his study in design. He received his Bachelor of Fine Art with distinction in Graphic and Packaging Design at Art Center in 1996.

== Career ==
After graduation in 1996, Esquer worked as a graphic designer at Rebeca Méndez Communication Design in Altadena, California. In September 1996, he moved to New York City to begin work as a graphic designer at Poppe Tyson Interactive. He has lived in Manhattan ever since. In 1997, he joined RadicalMedia as an Art Director, and worked in its Communication Design group for 7 years, rising to Creative Director. His group at RadicalMedia won the National Design Award in Communication Design from the Cooper-Hewitt, Smithsonian Design Museum in 2004.

Esquer left RadicalMedia in 2004 to open his own design firm, Alfalfa Studio. He selected the name "Alfalfa" as a reference to his childhood in Sonora, Mexico, where alfalfa is widely cultivated for grazing and fodder. Esquer said, "As a farm boy, I would feed my family's cows with it. So, the name is a general reminder of where I come from, but also a specific reminder of that boy who dreamed that anything was possible, whose dreams were as fresh and green and nourishing as alfalfa."

For more than 20 years, Esquer has run Alfalfa Studio as a small, independent agency, creating enduring work in sports, arts and culture, hospitality, entertainment, and government. In its early years, the studio was on Gansevoort Street in the Meatpacking District followed by many years on Centre Street in SoHo. In 2019, Esquer moved it to Convent Avenue on Sugar Hill in West Harlem. His philosophy has remained unchanged: Make the idea clear and simple, the design surprising and beautiful. His clients have included Paramount, Brookfield Properties, New York City Football Club, Booz Allen, Darden Restaurants, Open House New York, Guggenheim Partners, Ford Foundation, Museum of the City of New York, Goethe Institut, Kate Spade New York, The Glass House, Björk, Amphibian Stage, Repertorio Español, the Houston Rockets, The New York Times Magazine, Nike, AIGA, International Flavors & Fragrances, Target, Scholastic, El Museo del Barrio, the Government of New York City, and MTV.

== Selected works ==
=== Sports branding ===
==== New York City Football Club original badge ====
In November 2013, Esquer was hired by New York City Football Club (NYCFC) and its parent organization, Manchester City Football Club, to create the original club badge for NYCFC. On March 10, 2014, NYCFC announced that two of Esquer's badge designs (one shield-shaped, the other circular) would be put to a public vote by NYCFC fans. Claudio Reyna, Sporting Director of NYCFC said, "Thanks to the work of Rafael Esquer, we feel that we have two designs that truly represent our Club and our City, and we're excited to see which badge they choose." On March 20, 2014, Tim Pernetti, Chief Business Officer of NYCFC, unveiled Esquer's circular badge as the winner and the official club badge. A video and photos of the unveiling ceremony were posted online by Major League Soccer and NYCFC.

==== Houston Rockets logo ====
In 2002–2003, Esquer designed the new logo and typeface for the Houston Rockets in collaboration with Eiko Ishioka, who designed the new uniforms.

==== 2002 Winter Olympics uniforms ====
In 2001–2002, Esquer collaborated with Eiko Ishioka on designs for Salt Lake City 2002 Winter Olympics uniforms for Switzerland, Japan, Canada, and Spain, manufactured by Japanese sportswear company Descente.

=== Civic branding ===
==== Made in NY logo ====
In 2004, Esquer designed the Made in NY logo at RadicalMedia for the New York City Mayor's Office of Film, Theatre & Broadcasting.

==== NYC311 logo ====
In 2002, Esquer designed the NYC311 logo and branding for the launch of New York's comprehensive city government information and services call center.

=== Music packaging, posters, and prints ===
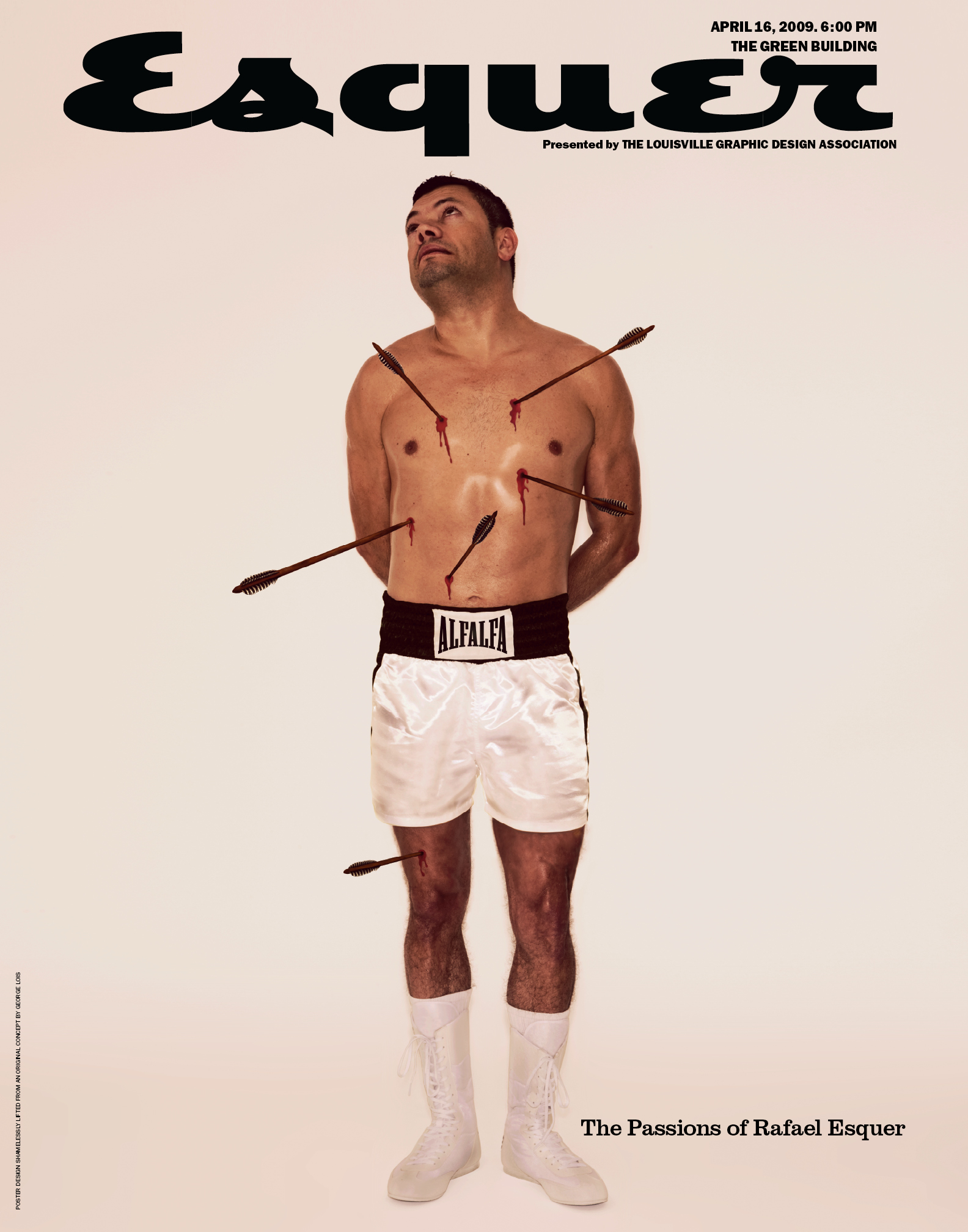
The Passions of Rafael Esquer. Presentation, Louisville Graphic Design Assoc., 2009.

- Cocoon by Björk, CD single. Created in 2002 in collaboration with Eiko Ishioka.
- Chavela at Carnegie Hall, CD. Created in 2004, a special collector's edition with a custom foil-embossed double cover and a 20-page book of Esquer's original illustrations.
- Vote, poster. Created for the AIGA "Get Out the Vote" initiative in 2004 and included in the Library of Congress poster collection and the Stewart Collection at the Montreal Museum of Fine Arts.
- Iconic Places, poster series. Iconic New York won the Merit Award in the Graphis Poster 2015 competition; Iconic New York Illuminated and Iconic London are in the David Rumsey Map Collection at Stanford University; and Iconic Florida is in the Touchton Map Library at the Tampa Bay History Center.
- The Passions of Rafael Esquer, poster. Created in 2009 for the Louisville Graphic Design Association in Louisville, Kentucky. An homage to the April 1968 Esquire cover of Muhammad Ali by George Lois.
- East LA Lowrider Bike, silk screen print. Created for the international show Chain Reaction: Posters About Bikes at the Design Museum of Chicago in 2018.

== Teaching ==
School of Visual Arts (SVA), Division of Continuing Education, New York City.

École Intuit Lab. International Workshop, Poster Design. Mumbai, New Delhi, Kolkata, and Bengaluru, India.

== Publications ==
Preface, "The X Factor of Sports Design." Win Out: The Best of Sports Graphic Design and Branding. Wang Shaoqiang, ed. Hong Kong: Sandu Publishing Co, Ltd., 2019.

== Selected group exhibitions ==
Design Journeys: You Are Here. AIGA National Design Center, New York, 2010.

Björk Retrospective. MoMA, New York, 2015.

AMPL!FY: Advancing the Front Lines of Social Justice. MAD: Museum of Arts and Design, New York, 2017–2018.

Chain Reaction: An International Print Show Featuring Two-Wheeled Artwork. Design Museum of Chicago, 2018–2019.

IdentificarX, Celebrating ArtCenter's Latina/e/o/x Alumni Community. Art Center College of Design, 2024.
