= Chavela (film) =

- Film poster
- Directed by: Catherine Gund; Daresha Kyi
- Produced by: Catherine Gund; Daresha Kyi
- Cinematography: Natalia Cuevas; Catherine Gund; Paula Gutiérrez Orio
- Edited by: Carla Gutierrez
- Music by: Gil Talmi
- Release date: February 9, 2017 (Berlin)
- Running time: 93 minutes
- Countries: Mexico; Spain
- Languages: English; Spanish

Chavela is a 2017 American documentary film, directed by Catherine Gund and Daresha Kyi. The film is a portrait of Mexican singer and actress Chavela Vargas. Vargas was known for her singing of boleros and behavior on and off the stage. The film covers her identity as a singer and lesbian, something she did not publicly confirm until much later in her life.

The film premiered at the 67th Berlin International Film Festival on February 9, 2017, in the Panorama Dokumente program. It was picked up for international distribution by Latido Films.

The film was a GLAAD Media Award nominee for Outstanding Documentary at the 29th GLAAD Media Awards. The film was screened at the 2017 Inside Out Film and Video Festival, where it won the Audience Award for Best Documentary, and at the 2018 Queer North Film Festival, where it won the Audience Choice award for Best Women's Film. The film also won a Pink Dragon Audience Award for the best film at the 2017 Ljubljana LGBT Film Festival.

== Critical reception ==
On the review aggregator website Rotten Tomatoes, 95% of 40 critics' reviews are positive, with an average rating of 7/10. The website's consensus reads: "Chavela pays affecting tribute to its subject with an absorbing documentary that outlines her remarkable life while effectively communicating the power and lingering impact of her art." Metacritic, which uses a weighted average, assigned the film a score of 68 out of 100, based on 9 critics, indicating "generally favorable" reviews.

== Format ==
The soundtrack for the documentary contains mostly songs performed by Chavela Vargas. The film contains archival interview footage recorded by Catherine Gund. The film breaks from the previous mythification of Chavela Vargas as a unique artistic object.
