= Chavela Vargas (album) =

Studio album by Chavela Vargas
- Released: 1961
- Genre: Bolero ranchera
- Label: RCA Victor

Chavela Vargas chronology
Noche Bohemia (1961)	Chavela Vargas (1961)

Chavela Vargas is the second album by Mexican singer Chavela Vargas. It was released in 1961 on the RCA Victor label. Vargas was accompanied on the recording by the Cuarteto Lara Foster. The album included "La Llorona" which became one of Vargas' best known songs.

In a 2024 ranking of the 600 greatest Latin American albums, Chavela Vargas was ranked No. 26. Reviewer José Luis Mercado called it "a timeless gem" that "challenges conventional labels" and added that "each note of this album is a reminder of the transformative power of music and the lasting impact of a brave and visionary artist."

The album was performed live in October 2023 under the direction of Ernesto Snajer at the Centro Cultural Kirchner in Buenos Aires, as part of its "Discos esenciales de Latinoamérica" series. Singers included Juli Laso, La Ferni, Mel Muñiz, Soema Montenegro, Maggie Cullen, Maca Mona Mu, and Ana Prada.

== Track listing ==
Side A

1. No Volveré (Ernesto M. Cortazar, Manuel Esperón González)
2. Desdeñosa (Benigno Lara Foster, Vaqueiro)
3. La Llorona
4. La Niña Isabel (Alejo Montoro, Juan Solano)
5. Rayando El Sol (Manuel María Ponce Cuéllar)
6. El Día Que Me Dijiste (Gela Gurria)

Side B

1. Manzanita (Pepe Dominguez)
2. Un Mundo Raro (José Alfredo Jiménez)
3. Paloma Negra (Tomas Mendez)
4. Golondrina Viajera (Ricardo Palmerín)
5. La Churrasca
6. Adiós Paloma (Chavela Vargas)
