= Noche Bohemia =

Studio album by Chabela Vargas
- Released: 1961
- Label: Orfeón

Chabela Vargas chronology
Noche Bohemia (1961)	Chavla Vargas (1961)

Noche Bohemia is the debut album by Mexican singer Chavela Vargas, credited on the album as "Chabela Vargas". It was released in 1961 on the Orfeón label. Vargas was accompanied on the recording by guitarist Antonio Bribiesca. Noche Bohemia was the first of more than 80 records by Vargas. The album included "Macorina" which became one of Vargas' best known songs.

== Track listing ==
Side A

1. Simón Blanco (Arnaldo Ramirez)
2. Macorina
3. La China
4. Verde Luna
5. Quisera Amarte Menos
6. Pena Mulata

Side B

1. Aquél Amor (Agustín Lara)
2. Maringá
3. Negra María
4. No Te Importe Saber
5. Mi Segundo Amor (Cuates Castilla)
6. La Noche De Mi Mal (José Alfredo Jiménez)
