= Mary Enoch Elizabeth Baxter =

American multimedia artist and activist

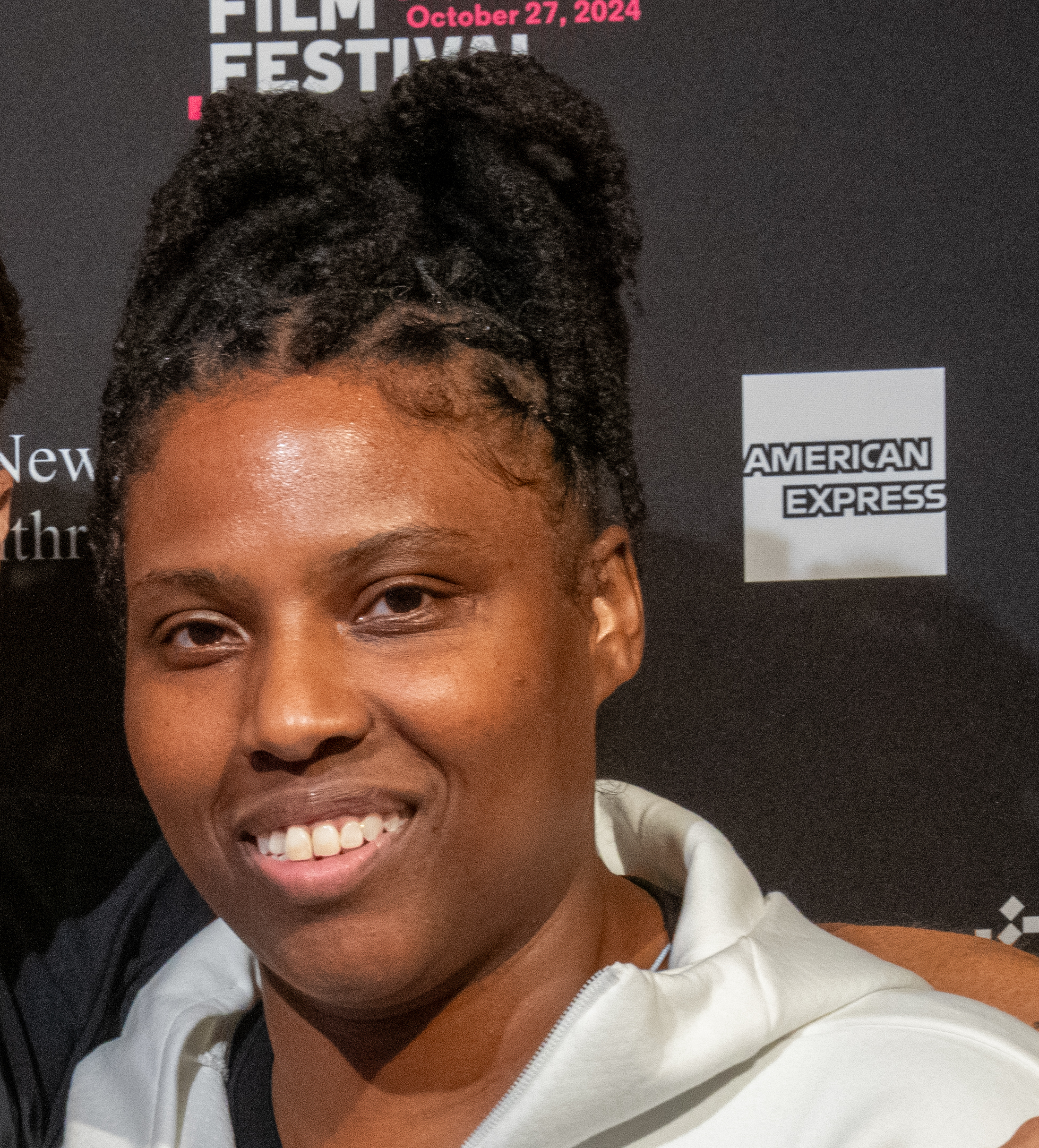
- Mary Enoch Elizabeth Baxter at the Montclair Film Festival in 2024
- Born: December 1981 (age 44)
- Other names: Isis Tha Saviour
- Education: Community College of Philadelphia; Penn State University
- Occupations: Multimedia artist, activist
- Awards: Anonymous Was A Woman Award (2024); Soros Justice Fellow (2023)

Mary Enoch Elizabeth Baxter is a multimedia artist, activist, prison reform advocate and speaker based in Brooklyn, New York. She is best known for creating socially conscious visual art, film, and music, and raps under the stage name of Isis Tha Saviour.

== Early life and education ==
Baxter was born in 1981, and grew up in Philadelphia. As a child, Baxter recalls stealing food stamps from her cousin and cutting them into pieces for use in a collage. She was raised by her mother, who was diagnosed with schizophrenia.

In the sixth grade, one of Baxter's artworks was submitted to a local contest by her art teacher. Baxter won, and her work was displayed in a window at a Macy's department store, across the street from Philadelphia City Hall. By age 12, Baxter was a ward of the state, and was also diagnosed with oppositional defiant disorder. At the age of 17, she was accepted to Penn State University to major in African American studies.

In 2007, Baxter was arrested for an outstanding warrant and initially incarcerated at Riverside Correctional Facility. She was 9 months pregnant at the time. Baxter endured 43 hours of labor ending in an emergency C-section, during which she was shackled to her bed the entire time.

Baxter earned an associate degrees in art and design and behavioral health from the Community College of Philadelphia.

== Career ==
From 2010 to 2017, Baxter focused on making music and a hip-hop artist career. She performs the stage name of Isis Tha Saviour, which she chose for Isis, the Egyptian goddess of motherhood.

In 2020, Baxter's video installation was included in the "Marking Time: Art in the Age of Mass Incarceration" exhibit at MOMA PS1.

In 2021, Baxter worked as an office manager for Mural Arts Philadelphia, which is based in the Thomas Eakins House. That year, she released Consecration to Mary, a photographic series based on a "sexually exploitative nude photographs of a young Black girl" taken by Thomas Eakins, a serial sexual predator, in 1882. Baxter superimposes images of herself over the girl in the original photo, creating a new image where the victim is protected. Baxter herself has been critical of Eakins, writing an op-ed in The Philadelphia Inquirer "decrying the city's veneration of Eakins".

In 2023, Baxter was featured in a solo exhibition at the Brooklyn Museum, titled ""Ain't I a Woman" and released a song with the same name, a reference to the poem Ain't I a Woman? by abolitionist Sojourner Truth. The museum exhibit presented two works, a short film and a multi-part photographic piece. The song was an original hip-hop composition released under her performance name Isis Tha Saviour. Baxter drew upon her own experiences of being shackled during childbirth to "underscore the through-lines between mass incarceration and slavery". Author Nicole Fleetwood further writes: "Baxter links the experiences of contemporary black women in US prisons to the experiences of enslaved black women, especially regarding their reproductive labor and the disorganization of the black family by racial capitalism."

Baxter served as an executive producer and co-starred with Faith Ringgold in the documentary "Paint Me a Road Out of Here", which premiered at the Smithsonian National Museum of African American History and Culture on June 14, 2024. The film interweaves the stories of Ringgold and Baxter, exploring their efforts to "make change for incarcerated and impoverished women."

Baxter is a co-founder of the Dignity Act Now Collective.

== Personal ==
On February 2, 2024, Baxter received an executive pardon from Pennsylvania Governor Josh Shapiro and the Commonwealth of Pennsylvania.

== Exhibitions ==
Baxter's work has been exhibited at several venues and on television, including African American Museum in Philadelphia, Ben & Jerry's Factory (Waterbury, Vermont), Brooklyn Museum, Brown University, Eastern State Penitentiary, Frieze Los Angeles, Frieze New York 2024, Martos Gallery (New York), MoMA PS1, National Museum of World Cultures, National Underground Railroad Freedom Center, Schomburg Center for Research in Black Culture, Two Rivers Gallery (British Columbia, Canada), Yale Art Gallery, and on HBO’s The OG Experience at Studio 525 in Chelsea.

== Awards and honors ==
- 2017: Soze Right of Return Fellowship
- 2019: Leeway Foundation Transformation award
- 2021: Ed Trust Justice Fellow
- 2021: SheaMoisture and GOOD MIRRORS Emerging Visionary grantee
- 2021: Frieze Impact Prize award
- 2022: Art for Justice Fund grantee
- 2022: Artist2Artist Fellowship, Art Matters Foundation, New York
- 2022: Corrina Mehiel Fellow, S.O.U.R.C.E. Studio
- 2022: Pratt Forward fellow
- 2023: Soros Justice Fellow
- 2024: Anonymous Was A Woman Award for her "socially conscious music, film, performance and visual art".
