= Educational Video Center =

US youth media organization

The Educational Video Center, founded in 1984 by Steven Goodman in New York City, is a "non-profit youth media organization dedicated to teaching documentary video as a means to develop artistic, critical literacy, and career skills of young people, while nurturing their idealism and commitment to social change."

EVC students have created award-winning documentaries on a range of issues from immigration to the environment, from bullying and youth depression to policing and the juvenile justice system. Through Professional Development Programs, EVC offers teacher training courses, in-class coaching, and curricula.

"The radical participatory agenda suggested by [Steve] Goodman and the work of groups such as Global Village, DCTV, Videofreex, and others dovetailed with the media literacy movement and notions of a critical pedagogy informed by the ideas of Paulo Freire as articulated in his foundational book, Pedagogy of the Oppressed."

The 1986 EVC student documentary, 2371 Second Avenue: An East Harlem Story is "one of EVC’s earliest videos and best examples of how the center’s emphasis on young expressivity, social justice, and handheld camera becomes actualized," and also exemplifies video as a tool for "collective voice and action."
