= La Llorona (Chavela Vargas album) =

Studio album by Chavela Vargas
- Released: 1994
- Recorded: April 1993
- Studio: Musitron, Madrid, Spain
- Length: 44:08
- Label: WEA

La Llorona is an album by Mexican singer Chavela Vargas. It was recorded in Madrid and released in 1994 by WEA. Vargas was accompanied on the recording by guitarists Marcela Rodríguez and Oscar Ramos. National Public Radio called it one of her strongest albums.

== Track listing ==
1. Cruz de Olvido
2. Sombras
3. Rogaciano
4. La China
5. Amanecí en tus Brazos
6. Luz de Luna
7. De un Mundo Raro
8. La Llorona
9. Toda una Vida
10. A Prisión Perpetua
11. El Andariego
