= Alfonso Camín =

Spanish poet

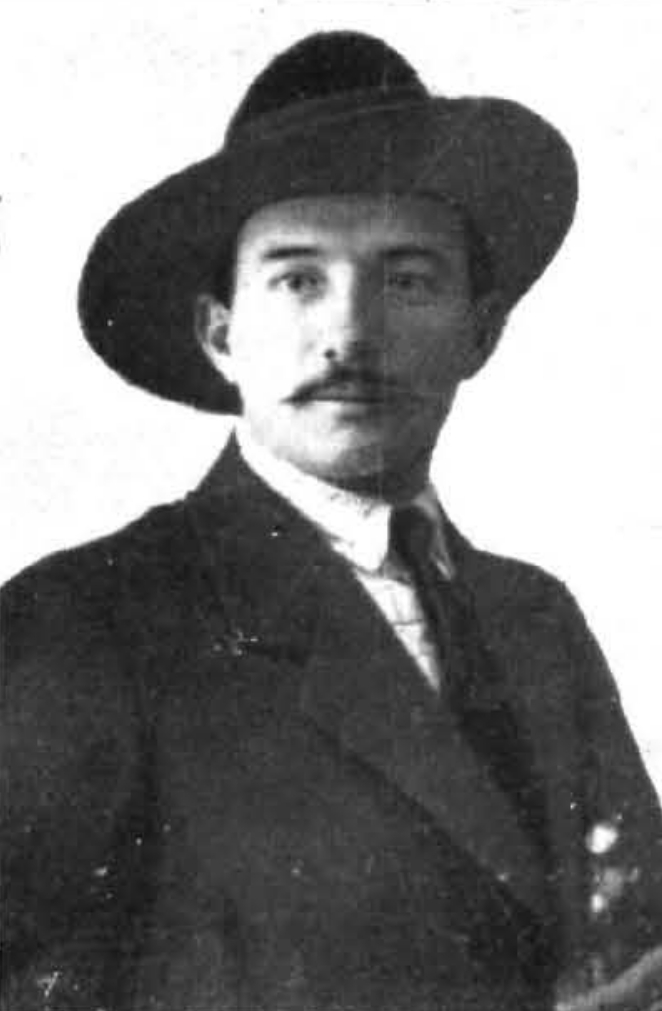

Alfonso Camín (August 2, 1890 – December 12, 1982) was a Spanish poet, writer and journalist. Recurrent themes in his work include Asturian, Afro-Cuban and Mexican culture.

His most acclaimed poem, "Macorina", was famously sung by Chavela Vargas.
