= Juan Carlos del Valle =

Mexican painter

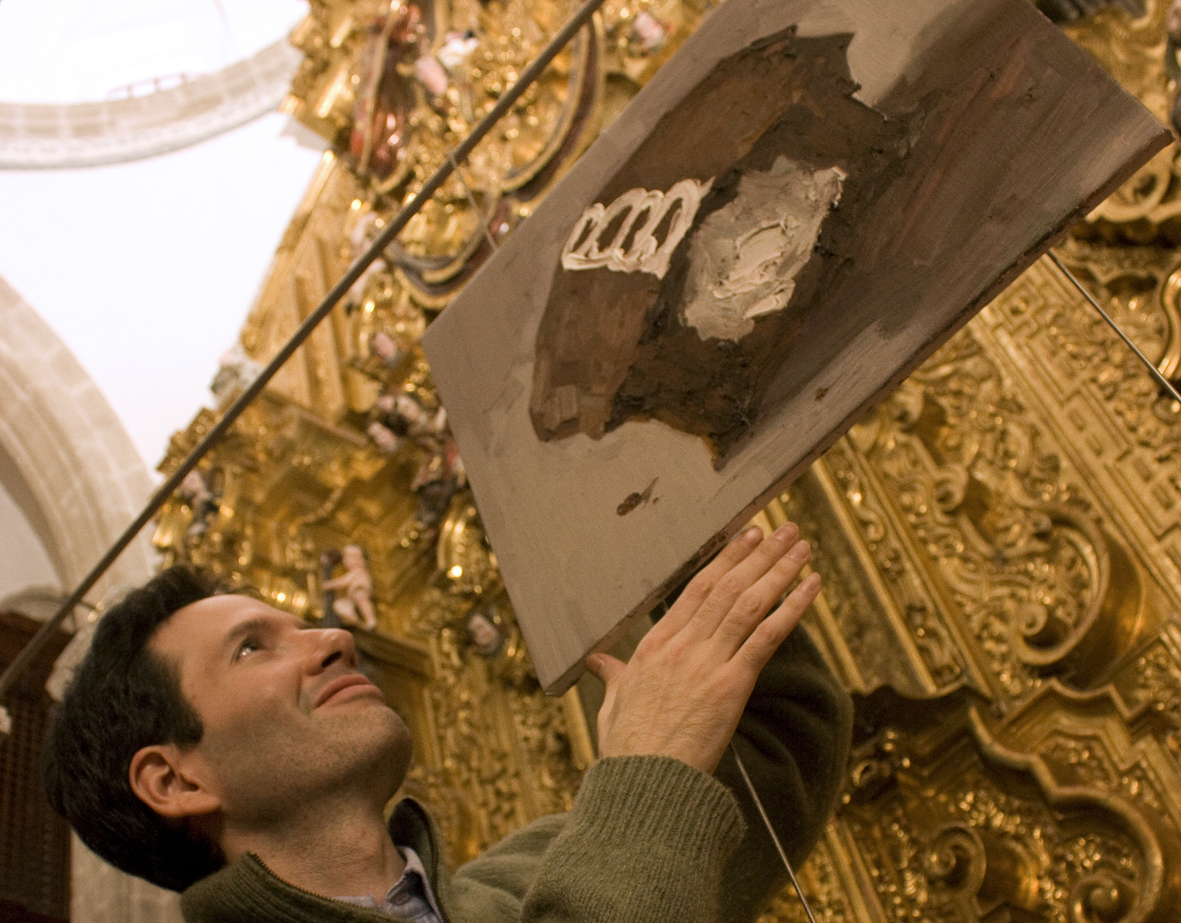
- Born: August 9, 1975 (age 49); Mexico City
- Website: www.juancarlosdelvalle.com.mx

Juan Carlos del Valle (born 1975) is a realist painter. In his work, he alters icons from contemporary myths, such as processed food, toys, and fantastic narratives. From 2004 to 2017, he presented in more than forty exhibitions throughout Mexico, the United States, and Peru. More recently, his work has addressed relational art, which employs and addresses social and human relationships.

== Biography ==
Juan Carlos del Valle was born in Mexico City on August 9, 1975. He joined the studio of Demetrio Llordén (1931–2000) in 1995, who had studied with painter José Bardasano (1910–1979). After Llordén died on December 26, 2000, Del Valle took classes with painter José Manuel Schmill (1934–), focusing on the study of landscapes.

== Work ==
The book Oscuridad Luminosa ("Luminous Darkness") was published in 2002; the volume contains a selection of Del Valle's drawings from 1997 to 2002.

The second volume of his work, entitled El juicio de los ojos ("The eyes within"), was jointly produced by the Instituto Nacional de Bellas Artes, and the publishing house RM in 2006.

The works in El juicio de los ojos were presented in an exhibition that traveled to museums in cities throughout Mexico, and the volume also served as an exhibition catalog. Also in 2006, the documentary Juan Carlos del Valle. Pintor ("Juan Carlos del Valle. Painter") was released.

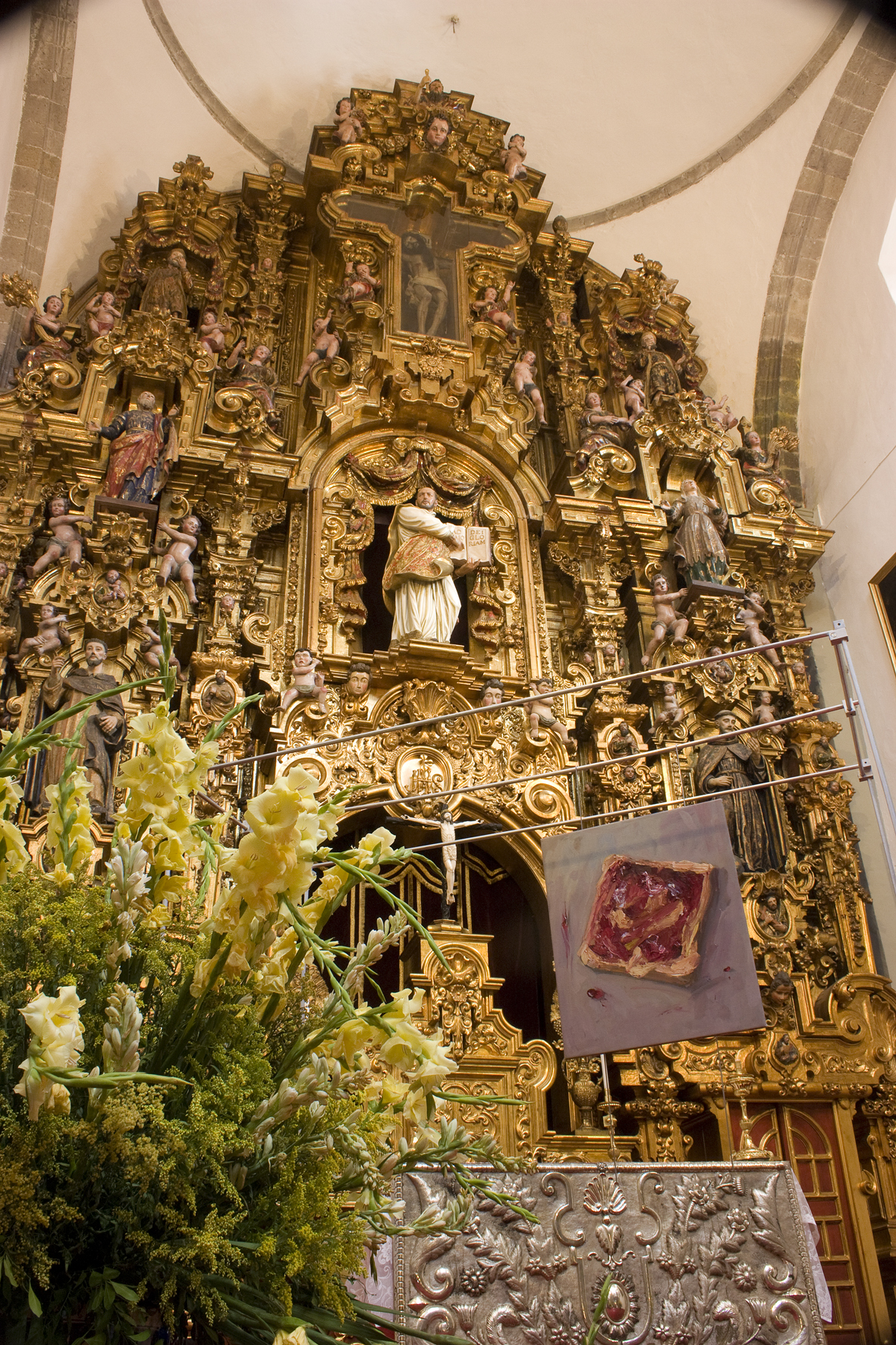
Our Daily Bread. Presentation of El Pan de cada Día (Our Daily Bread). Chapel of the Colegio de Vizcaínas. September 2009.

El devenir de la luz ("The Progression of Light", 2006), is a collection of paintings and drawings and was exhibited at the Museo de la Ciudad de México (Museum of Mexico City). Meanwhile, El juicio de los ojos traveled around the country under the name The Eyes Within, and it was presented at the Instituto Cultural de México in San Antonio, Texas, in 2007.

A reading alluding to Christian symbols gave rise to the project El pan de cada día ("Our Daily Bread"), produced in collaboration with Caritas, Mexico City, and IAP. The twenty-five canvases in this series were exhibited in the interior of churches in several Mexico City neighborhoods.

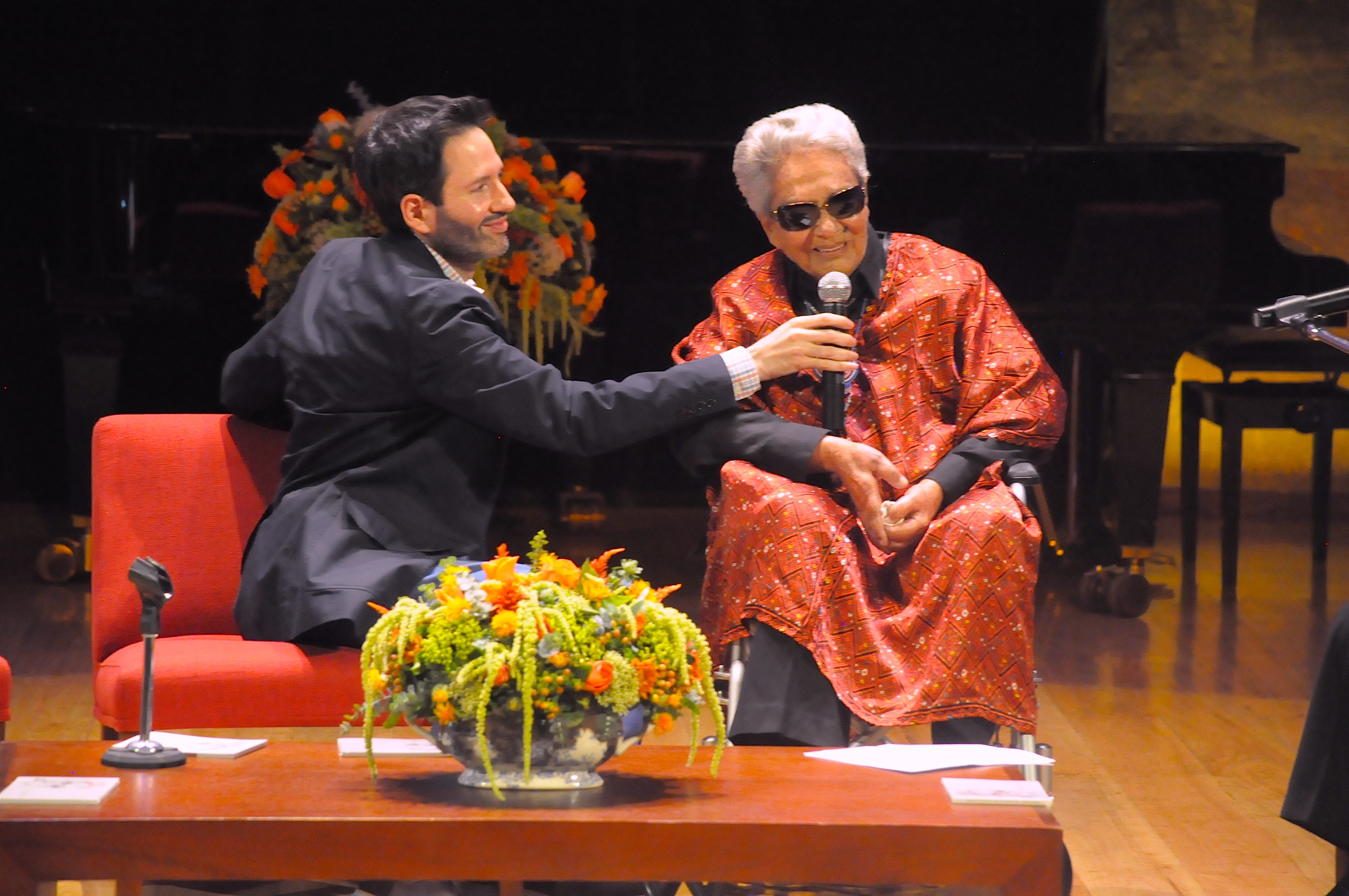
Juan Carlos del Valle and Chavela Vargas during the book presentation.

After the success of El pan de cada día, thirty events held in twelve churches in Mexico City and one in Metepec, attended by 26,577 people, Del Valle was invited to present the opening exhibition in the Museo del Chocolate (Chocolate Museum) in Mexico City on 22nd March 2012. His exhibition, Del Choco que Late ("Mad for Chocolate"), contained twenty-two works that interpreted chocolate as a metaphor for desire and prohibition. This exhibition was followed by Deseo... ese obscuro objeto (Desire, That Obscure Object), which was presented by the gallery Diego de Ybarra & Natalia Davila Fine Art in Mexico City.

That same year he drew thirty-five portraits of the singer Chavela Vargas, whom he had met a year earlier in Tepoztlán, Morelos. The collection was exhibited in June 2012 at the Centro Cultural de España en México, Mexico City.

In March 2013, Del Valle presented the commemorative exhibition honoring the twentieth anniversary of the Museo Felipe Santiago Gutiérrez of the Instituto Mexiquense de Cultura, in the city of Toluca. The exhibition Para comerte mejor ("The Better to Eat You With"), composed of sixty-five medium- and small-format oil on canvas works done from 2009 to 2012, marked a shift from the subject matter dealt with by the artist in previous stages of his work and explored new concerns. The collection had been presented earlier in the Centro Cultural Isidro Fabela, in the Museo Casa del Risco in Mexico City.

Del Valle participated in a performance of Engelbert Humperdinck’s opera Hansel and Gretel at the Fine Arts Palace in Mexico City in February 2013, featuring a curtain designed by him. He was the first Latin American artist to show his work at the Museum of Biblical Art in Dallas, Texas. His show Temptation, which opened in September, 2013, consisted of 52 paintings of mass-produced snack foods, exploring the transition human nature and the point of inflection between the sacred and the profane. In April 2014, Del Valle's self-portrait Yo... ("Me...") (2010) was selected for the international traveling exhibition Messico Circa 2000 from the José Pinto Mazal Collection. The exhibition opened at Miramare Castle in Trieste, Italy before moving on to other locations. In March 2015, Del Valle presented his show Yo Mero ("Me, Myself and I"), based on the selfie, at the Gallery of the Ministry of Economy in Mexico City. In 2017, he was invited by Grover Wilkins to project 9 paintings onto the backdrop of the Dallas City Performance Hall as part of an interdisciplinary and multicultural collaboration.
