= Selva Orejón =

Spanish cybersecurity expert (born 1981)

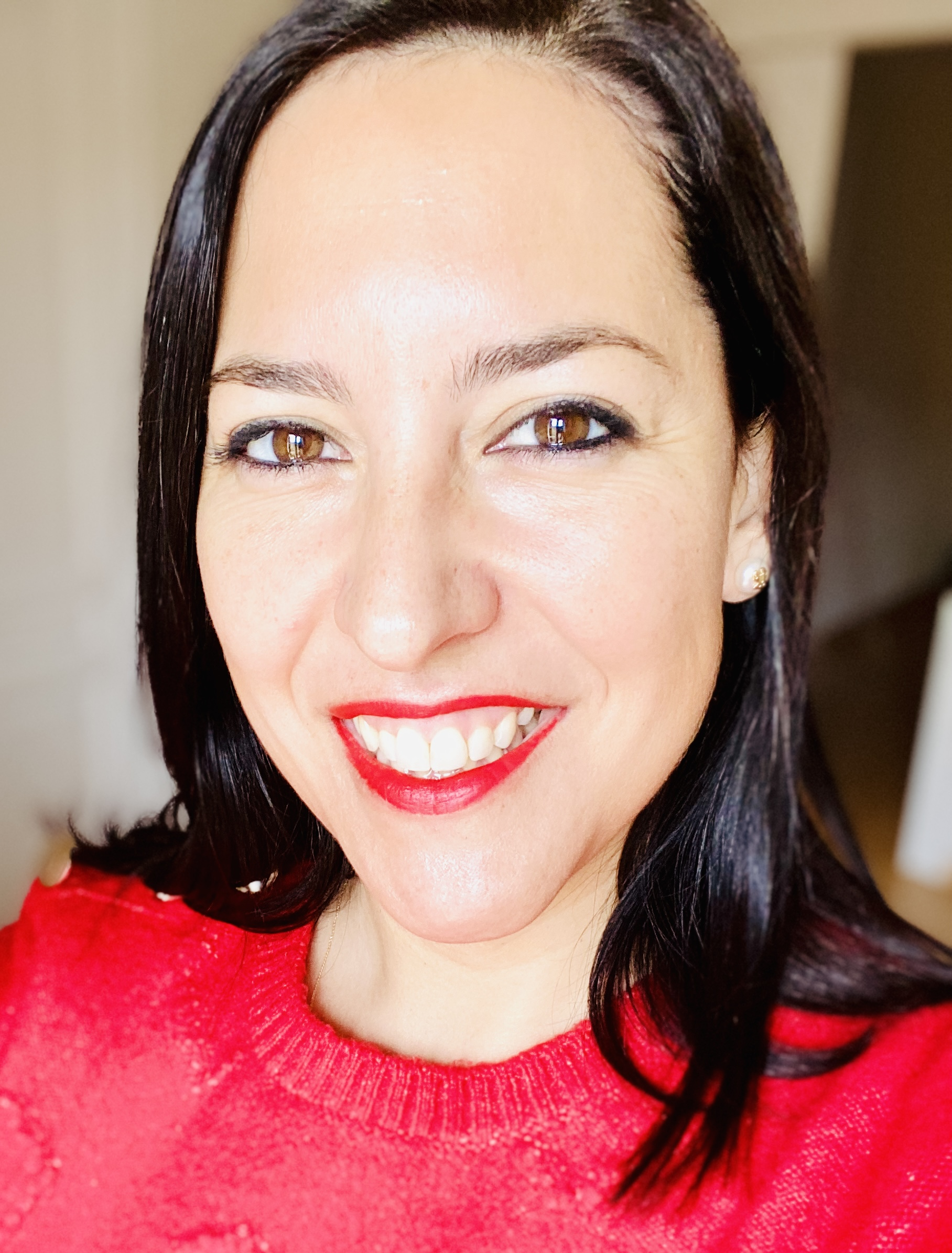
- Born: 1981 (age 44–45); Barcelona
- Education: Ramón Llull University
- Occupations: Cybersecurity and digital identity consultant, tv broadcaster
- Television: "Expediente Marlasca" La Sexta TV
- Website: https://onbranding.es/

Selva Orejón (born 1981, Barcelona) is a Spanish consultant expert in cybersecurity and digital identity, contributor to several radio and television programs; professor, author and founder/director of the digital reputation and cyber-research agency "OnBranding".

== Career development ==
She holds a degree in Communication Sciences from the Ramon Llull University, specializing in advertising and public relations and crisis management. She has taken several postgraduate courses related to security and business: diploma in Intelligence at the service of the state and the company (International University of Andalucía) and diploma in Business administration and environment (University of Cambridge).

She was director of strategic communications for thirteen years in several Spanish companies: Repsol, Grupo Planeta, Grupo Atofina, Holtzbrink Group and Grupo Agrolimen.

Working as director of the German social network SchülerVZ for Spain and Latin America, she witnessed the first cyber-attacks and extortions, and the need to deal with them in a professional way, taking digital reputation into account.

Back to Spain in 2007, she founded the company OnBranding, focusing on reputational crises and digital reputation management. After settling in Barcelona, the company grew in size and broadened its scope. In addition to dealing with smear campaigns of relevant companies, and establishing security shields, she has also developed a work to protect people in the digital environment, especially women who are victims of identity phishing on social networks.

In 2016, she began managing the digital reputation of celebrities through "Celebrandsec" after several cases of celebrity account hacks on Instagram and Facebook that were resold to criminal sectors or were used to extort money from their owners.

Also since 2016 she is a judicial expert collaborating with the Spanish administration of justice in digital identity, online reputation and image, and digital identity protection of protected witnesses. She is a member of the Catalan Association of Judicial and Forensic Experts.

As a judicial expert, she has a constant relationship with the courts and the police in the prosecution of digital crimes. For this reason, she has been threatened with death on several occasions due to her cyber investigations (in the dark web or dark areas of the internet where part of the criminal world is hosted).

== Teaching ==
She is a professor at several universities and business schools:

- ESIC (2010- ....): Master in online reputation and online communities.
- EAE Business School (2011- ...): E-Commerce and Master in Online Marketing.
- INESDI Digital Business School (2012-...): Social Media Security, SMO, Blogging and Content Tools and director of the postgraduate course in Cybersecurity.
- CRIAP Institute (2015-...): Director of the Cybercrime Postgraduate Course.
- Universitat de Barcelona, Instituto de Formación Continua IL3: Lecturer in cybersecurity (2016) and Ciberintel-ligència (2017).
- Francisco de Vitoria University (2019-...): Professor of SOCMINT, Social Media intelligence and Master in Cyberintelligence.

== Media: Radio and TV programs ==
As a journalist on cybersecurity issues, she is a regular contributor to several radio and television programs. Since 2016 she is involved in the morning program "El matí a Ràdio 4", RTVE; and since 2017 in "Expediente Marlasca", and “Equipo de investigación”, La Sexta TV. She has been involved in several radio programs of Catalonia Radio 2,RAC1, and Onda Cero.

== Publications ==
- Social media business intelligence (2014), IMF, October 2014.
- Relationship marketing (2017), Ediciones Roble, ISBN 978-84-16756-50-6
- Digital identity and Socmint (published in Spanish "Identidad digital y Socmint") (2020).
- Selva Orejón y Rubén Ríos (2020) "Identidad digital: métodos de análisis y valoración de pérdida de imagen en la red", ISBN 978-1707007219
- Rubén Ríos y Selva Orejón (2020) “Caso de una menor desaparecida con su hijo recién nacido” en Jorge Nogueira (coord.) Tratado de investigação criminal tecnológica.
