= Selva, Grigno =

Selva
- Hamlet
- Location within Trentino-Alto Adige/Südtirol Location within Italy
- Coordinates: 46.016°N 11.595°E

Population
  - Total: 200

Selva is a hamlet of the municipality of Grigno in the province of Trentino. Located at 267 metres (876 ft) above sea level, the small settlement has 98 inhabitants and is 4.5 kilometres (2.8 mi) away from Grigno.

== Road to Rifugio la Barricata ==
From the small hamlet the road leads to the Marcesina plateau, the destination of many cycling and motorcyclist excursions. However, the road is often closed during the winter due to the heavy snowfall affecting the area.
