= Selva Selvaratnam =

British businessman

- Born: India
- Education: Cardiff University (PhD, Electronics)
- Occupations: Businessman; technology executive
- Employers: Panjia Technologies (founder); HID Global Corporation (EVP Engineering; CTO; SVP); De La Rue (CTO, 2015–2019); OpSec Security (CEO)
- Known for: Founder of Panjia Technologies; CTO of HID Global Corporation; CTO of De La Rue; CEO of OpSec Security
- Awards: Gold Shield Award (Global Security Industry Alliance)

Selva Selvaratnam is a British businessman born in India.

Selvaratnam was born in India, but moved to the UK in the early 1980s. After receiving a PhD in electronics from Cardiff University he set up his own firm, Panjia Technologies, in 1984/1985, which was subsequently acquired by HID Global Corporation/Assa Abloy.

After the acquisition, Selvaratnam was an executive vice president of engineering at HID Global Corporation. He later became the chief technology officer and senior vice president at the company. In this role, he received the prestigious Gold Shield Award which is awarded by the Global Security Industry Alliance to professionals who have made "outstanding contributions in the global security industry".

Since April 2015, Selvaratnam has been the chief technology officer at De La Rue. From 2015 until 2019 he was appointed with De La Rue to form the organisation and strategy for products, technology and services to transition the group into a technology-led entity. He is currently working as CEO of OpSec Security.
