= Chavela Vargas =

Mexican singer (1919–2012)

The Most Excellent Chavela Vargas
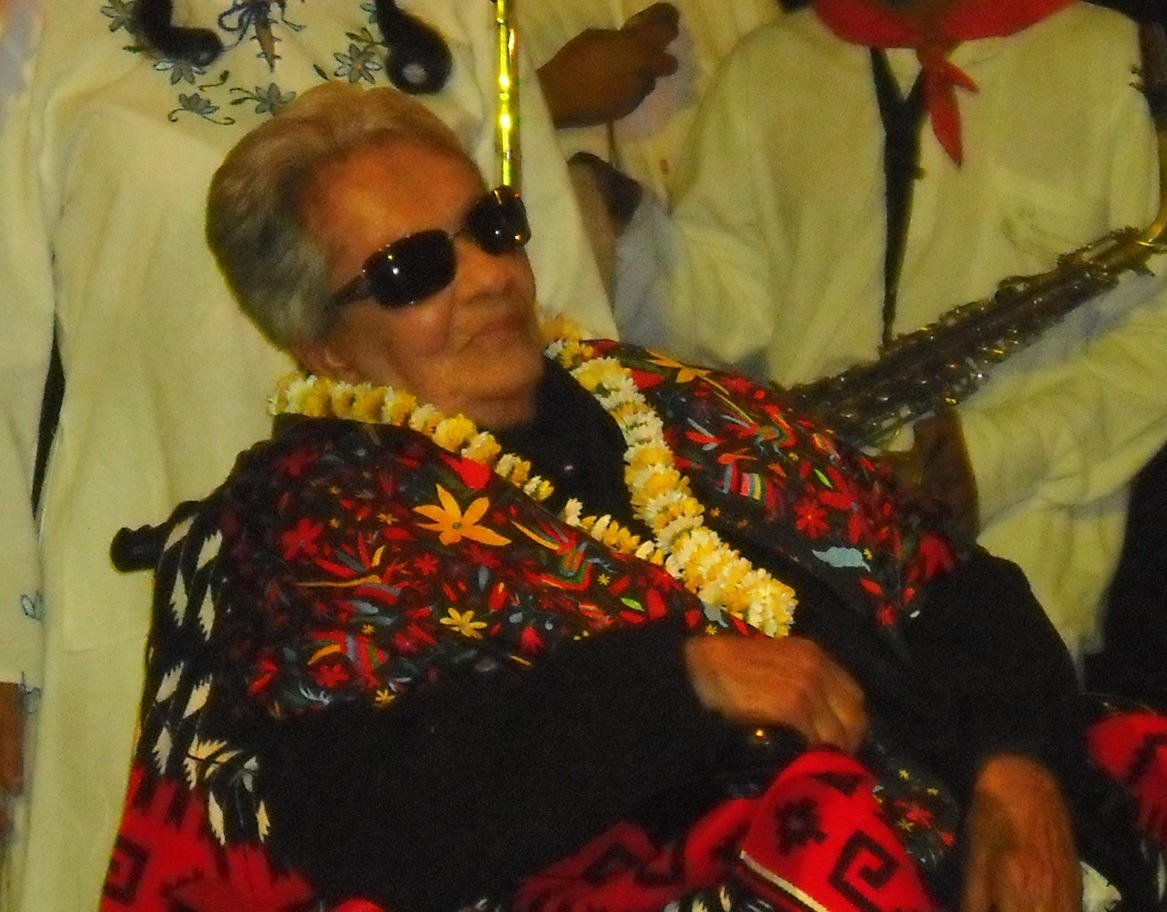
- Vargas, 2009
- Born: María Isabel Anita Carmen de Jesús Vargas Lizano; 17 April 1919; San Joaquín de Flores, Heredia, Costa Rica
- Died: 5 August 2012 (aged 93); Cuernavaca, Morelos, Mexico
- Citizenship: Mexico
- Occupations: Singer; songwriter; actress
- Years active: 1961–2012
- Musical career
- Genre: Ranchera
- Instruments: Vocals; acoustic guitar
- Label: RCA Mexicana

María Isabel Anita Carmen de Jesús Vargas Lizano (Spanish pronunciation: [tʃaˈβela ˈβaɾɣas]; 17 April 1919 – 5 August 2012), known professionally as Chavela Vargas, was a Costa Rican and Mexican singer, songwriter, and actress. She gained widespread recognition for her distinctive interpretations of Mexican rancheras. However, her impact extends beyond this genre, encompassing various styles within popular Latin American music.

An influential interpreter, Vargas left a legacy on both the Americas and Europe. Renowned for her poignant and captivating performances, she earned the title "la voz áspera de la ternura", translated as 'the rough voice of tenderness'. Her accolades include a Latin Grammy Lifetime Achievement Award, and the Grand Cross of the Order of Isabella the Catholic for her contributions to music.

== Early life and career ==
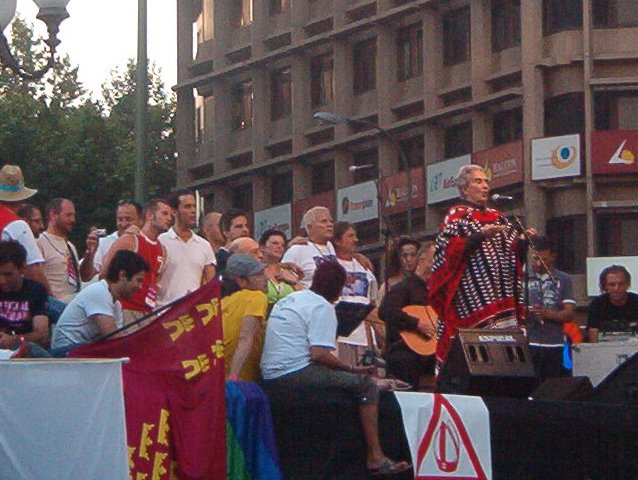
Vargas during a concert in Spain, 2006

She was born in Costa Rica, in San Joaquín de Flores, as Isabel Vargas Lizano, daughter of Francisco Vargas and Herminia Lizano. She was baptized on 15 July 1919 with the forenames "María Isabel Anita Carmen de Jesús." She had a difficult childhood: her parents divorced and left her under the care of an uncle, and she contracted polio. She went by Chavela, which is a pet name for Isabel. At age 17, she abandoned her native country due to lack of opportunities for a musical career, seeking refuge in Mexico, where an entertainment industry was burgeoning. There she resided for more than seventy years and obtained Mexican nationality.

For many years she sang on the streets, but in her thirties she became a professional singer. In her youth she dressed as a man, smoked cigars, drank heavily, carried a gun, and was known for her characteristic red jorongo, which she wore in performances until old age. Vargas was radical in her negation of heteronormativity. Since she preferred to dress like a man, Vargas' parents hid their defiantly nonfeminine daughter from guests.

Vargas sang the canción ranchera in her own distinctive style. The ranchera was sung from a man's perspective and with a mariachi accompaniment. Chavela sang this type of song as a solo, using only guitar and voice. She often slowed down the tempo of melodies to draw more dramatic tension out of songs, so they could be taken as naughtily humorous.

Towards the end of the 1950s, she became known within artistic circles, due in part to her performances in Acapulco, center of international tourism, where she sang at the Champagne Room of the restaurant La Perla. Her first album, Noche Bohemia (Bohemian Night), was released in 1961 with the professional support of José Alfredo Jiménez, one of the foremost singer/songwriters of Mexican ranchera music. She eventually recorded more than 80 albums. Vargas was hugely successful during the 1950s, the 1960s, and the first half of the 1970s, touring in Mexico, the United States, France, and Spain. She was also close with many prominent artists and intellectuals of the time, including Juan Rulfo, Agustín Lara, Frida Kahlo and her husband Diego Rivera, Dolores Olmedo, and Jiménez. Vargas was known to have had various lesbian relationships and is rumored to have had affairs with Frida Kahlo and Ava Gardner. Although her lyrics were addressed to women, Vargas did not publicly come out until the age of 81 in her 2002 autobiography And If You Want to Know about My Past (Y si quieres saber de mi pasado).

== Partial retirement and return to the stage ==
Vargas retired from performing due to a 15-year battle with alcoholism, which she described in her autobiography as "my 15 years in hell." Chavela could not maintain her heavy drinking and intense lifestyle. In 1970, "submerged in an alcoholic haze" as she described it, she was taken in by a native family who nursed her back to health without knowing who she was. In 2003, she told The New York Times that she had not had a drink in 25 years.

Vargas returned to the stage in 1991, performing at a bohemian nightclub called "El Hábito" in Coyoacán, Mexico City. Her career started to recover international prominence, with performances in Latin America, Europe and the United States. Vargas debuted at Carnegie Hall in 2003 at age 83 at the behest and promotion of Spanish director Pedro Almodóvar, an admirer and friend. The 2004 album Chavela at Carnegie Hall was produced from this concert.

== Sexuality and coming out ==
Long considered an open secret, she publicly came out as a lesbian at age 81 in her 2002 autobiography. Her coming out was not surprising to her fans. For years Vargas refused to change the genders in her songs. In "Paloma Negra" ("Black Dove"), Vargas accuses a woman of partying all night long and breaking her heart. Vargas herself, as a young woman, was alleged to have had an affair with Frida Kahlo during Kahlo's marriage to muralist Diego Rivera. From 1988 to 1993, she was in a relationship with her lawyer Alicia Elena Pérez Duarte.

== Gender performance & masculinity ==
Vargas' gender performativity did not reflect the Western binary of gender because she wore more masculine clothing, which in the 1940s, included pants, charro suits, sombreros, guayaberas, and ponchos. In Chavela, Vargas remembers people telling her, "she doesn't dress like a woman, style her hair or wear her makeup like a woman." Mid-20th century Mexico was not as accepting of Vargas and her music because her gender expression and sexual orientation were constantly questioned throughout her career. Anthropologists including Roger Lancaster, Joseph Carrier, and Stephen O. Murray studied the intersections of gender and sexuality in Latin America, and they claim "that patterns of sexuality can be as easily affected by political, social, and economic currents as gender relations." Vargas was publicly identified as a lesbian and her music would reflect queer love, joy, and heartbreak. Emma Perez commented on Vargas' role in shaping queerness in Mexico's music industry and calls it the sitio she "formed within Mexican popular music, a space/place for mestiza lesbian subjectivity, desire, and sexuality." Vargas' ability to engage with her sexuality through her music amidst finding success in a traditional country, where there was deep-rooted homophobia and religious fundamentalism, paved the way for LGBTQ artists like Concha Buika and other Latin women artists such as Lila Downs, Eugenia León, La Santa Cecilia, Julieta Venegas, and more.

Vargas' live performances and her music were passionate yet subtle references to her personal life. She naturally challenged structural notions of masculinity through her music and performance, since "she often declined to change the pronouns in love songs written by men from 'she' to 'he.' But she also tended to shun modern gender pigeonholes, noting that many described her as 'una rareza' -- a rarity." Vargas' artistry was determined by her queer experiences and performance, which was an image she held long before it was widely celebrated and accepted.

Vargas' songwriting resonated heavily with queer audiences. Marvette Perez, curator of Latin-American Culture and Music for the Smithsonian Museum of American History, described her sentiments on Vargas' song "Macorina" in an interview with NPR: "I don't think there could be a more queer song for a woman to sing. The song says, 'Ponme la mano aqui, Macorina.' 'Put your hand right here, Macorina.' And whenever she sang the song, she put such sexuality, desire, and kind of sensuality into it that you knew why she was singing, why she was singing and to whom she was singing it. She was singing it to a woman." Vargas captured audiences through her performances on stage and her masculine gender performance, which would posthumously become part of her understated queer legacy.

Her experience as a masculine ranchera singer in the 20th century led to marginalization and hate, which made her path as a woman in ranchera music much more difficult to garner more supporters. On the other hand, her fans recognize her "unsettling, coded, but undeniable connection between her interpretations and her physicality (the unique vocal technique to infuse emotions into the songs, her body in performance) must be turned comfortingly back to the realm of musicianship." Those who loved Vargas saw the brilliance in her gender-bending style and music, so she was able to thrive and find success even though her appearance was generally not accepted.

== Appearances in film ==
Vargas is featured in many of Almodóvar's films, including La flor de mi secreto in both song and video. She said, however, that acting was not her ambition, although she had previously participated in films such as the 1967 movie La Soldadera. Vargas also appeared in Frida, singing "La Llorona" ("The Weeping Woman"). Her classic "Paloma Negra" ("Black Dove") was also included in the soundtrack of the film. She appeared in Alejandro González Iñárritu's Babel, singing "Tú me acostumbraste" ("You got me used to"), a bolero by Frank Domínguez.

On 10 February 2017, the biographical film Chavela debuted. Directed by Catherine Gund and Daresha Kyi, the film features Pedro Almodóvar, Elena Benarroch and Miguel Bosé among others.

== Death and legacy ==
Chavela Vargas died in Cuernavaca, Mexico, after being hospitalized for several weeks due to respiratory issues. Her official Facebook page reported that her final words were, "I leave with Mexico in my heart."

On August 6, 2012, Chavela's funeral was held in Plaza Garibaldi in the center of Mexico city. The film Chavela included footage of her funeral. Hundreds of fans and loved ones gathered in order to honor her legacy where they played her music and drank her favorite drink, tequila. Chavela's ashes were scattered in Chalchi Hills, Morelos, Mexico.

The film Chavela mentions that after her newfound popularity in Spain, she no longer rejected the word "lesbian" despite having previously been offended by the term. In the film, Chavela states that there is no longer a need to be scared about defining herself as a lesbian, and embraced being open about who you are. In the film, one of the last statements she makes is that "My song is dedicated to all the women of the world: Mothers, daughters, sisters, wives, friends, and lovers."

A slogan that she lived by and would often tell her fans was "Human beings love, and that's all that matters. Don't ask them who they love or why." She had categorized the person she was before leaving for Mexico as Isabella, someone that she held dear. Whereas 'Chavela' was born in 1942 when she moved to Mexico and was someone who was "Cabrona." In the persona of Chavela, she found a safety net for herself that allowed her to continue living despite the turmoil she had faced. In one of her last interviews in the film, she states, "When you're true to yourself, you win in the end."

On 17 April 2013, Google celebrated her 94th birthday with a Google Doodle.

In August 2019, Vargas was one of the honorees inducted in the Rainbow Honor Walk, a walk of fame in San Francisco's Castro neighborhood noting LGBTQ people who have "made significant contributions in their fields."

== References in other works ==
Joaquín Sabina's song "Por el Boulevard de los Sueños Rotos" ("Down the Boulevard of Broken Dreams") is dedicated to Vargas. Sergio Ramírez Mercado, a Nicaraguan writer, published in 2011 the novel La Fugitiva, a fictionalized account of the life of Costa Rican writer Yolanda Oreamuno. In Ramírez' work, Oreamuno's life is told by three women who met her. According to many critics, one of the female characters telling Oreamuno's history is a singer who resembles Chavela Vargas. The character talks about her own life and her non-reciprocated love for Yolanda Oreamuno.

In 2012, the artist Juan Carlos del Valle presented a series of portraits of Vargas at the Centro Cultural de España en México, Mexico City.

== Selected discography ==
- Noche Bohemia Orfeón, 1961, w/ accompaniment of Antonio Bribiesca
- Chavela Vargas (album) RCA Victor, 1961, w/ accompaniment of Antonio Bribiesca
- Con el cuarteto Lara Foster, Orfeón, 1961
- Hacia la vida, Orfeón, 1966
- Corridos de la revolución, Orfeón, 1970
- Noche Bohemia, Orfeón, 1972 (compilation)
- Noche de Ronda, Orfeón, 1972 (compilation)
- Amanecí en tus brazos, Orfeón-Movieplay, 1973
- La Original, Orfeón, 1973
- Lamento Borincano, Orfeón-Movieplay, 1973
- Poema 20, Orfeón-Movieplay, 1975
- Piensa en mí AKA Vuelve, Orfeón, 1988
- La Llorona, Turner, 1993
- Volver, volver, Turner, 1993
- Macorina, WEA, 1994
- Sentimiento de México (vol. 1), Orfeón, 1995
- Sentimiento de México (vol. 2), Orfeón, 1995
- Sentimiento de México (vol. 3), Orfeón, 1995
- De México y del Mundo, Orfeón, 1995 (compilation)
- Le canta a México, Orfeón, 1995 (compilation)
- Volver, volver, Página/12, 1996 (compilation)
- Chavela Vargas, WEA, 1997 (compilation)
- Dos, Tropical, 1998 (compilation)
- Boleros, Orfeón, 1999 (compilation)
- Pasión bolero, Orfeón, 1999 (compilation)
- Colección de oro, 1999
- Con la rondalla del amor de Saltillo, 2000
- Para perder la cabeza, 2000
- Las 15 grandes de Chavela Vargas, 2000
- Grandes éxitos, 2002
- Para toda la vida, 2002
- Discografía básica, 2002
- Antología, 2004
- Somos, 2004
- En Carnegie Hall, 2004
- La Llorona, 2004
- Cupaima, 2006/2007
- Soledad, 2007
- Piensa en mí, on Splendor in the Grass by Pink Martini, 2009
- Luz de Luna, on San Patricio by The Chieftains featuring Ry Cooder, 2010
- Por mi culpa!, 2010
- Luna Grande, 2012

== See also ==
- Ranchera
- Cuco Sanchez
- Lesbian culture in Mexico City
- List of people from Morelos
