= Tanya Selvaratnam =

Writer, producer, theater artist, and activist

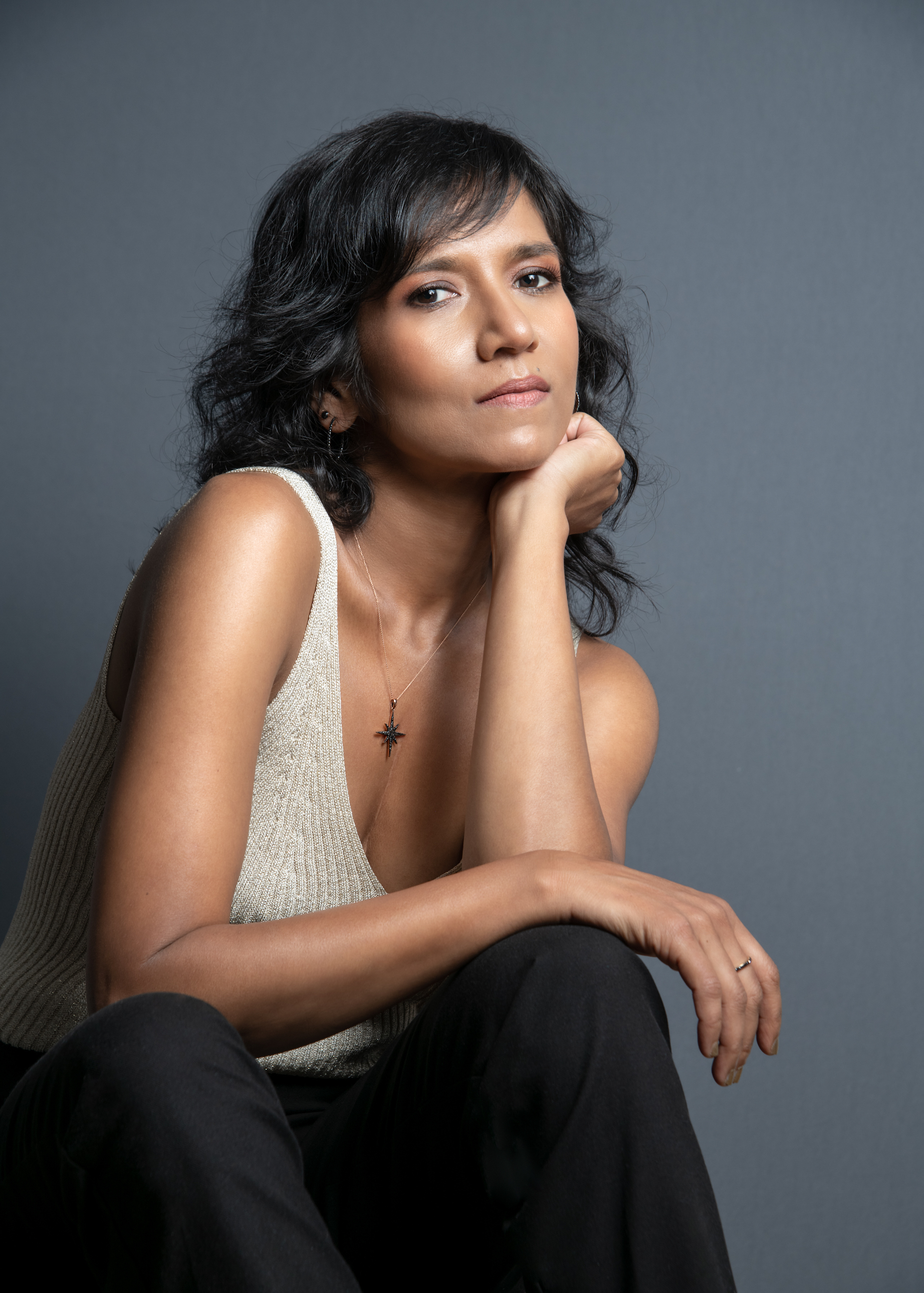
- Tanya Selvaratnam photographed by Nina Wurtzel in 2021
- Education: Phillips Academy Andover
- Alma mater: Harvard University
- Writing career
- Notable works: The Big Lie: Motherhood, Feminism, and the Reality of the Biological Clock; Assume Nothing: A Story of Intimate Violence

Tanya Selvaratnam (born 1971 or 1972) is a writer, film producer, activist, and actor. In January 2014, Selvaratnam published The Big Lie: Motherhood, Feminism, and the Reality of the Biological Clock. In 2021, she published Assume Nothing: A Story of Intimate Violence. Selvaratnam is a co-founder of The Federation, a coalition of artists, organizations, and allies committed to promoting art as a tool of intercultural communication and tolerance. She is also known for having made allegations of intimate partner violence against New York Attorney General Eric Schneiderman; her allegations, as well as similar allegations made by other women, led to Schneiderman's 2018 resignation from office.

== Early life and education ==
Selvaratnam was born in Colombo, Sri Lanka, and was raised in Long Beach, California. She attended high school at Phillips Academy Andover and graduated from Harvard University in 1992. Her master's thesis on the interplay of law and practice with regard to women's rights in China was published in the Journal of Law and Politics.

== Career ==
Selvaratnam is the Senior Advisor, Gender Justice Narratives, for the Pop Culture Collaborative. She is the author of two books: The Big Lie: Motherhood, Feminism, and the Reality of the Biological Clock (2014) and Assume Nothing: A Story of Intimate Violence (2020). Amazon Studios plans to create a limited series based on Assume Nothing, with Mimi Won Techentin serving as show runner. Priyanka Chopra Jonas will serve as a producer on the project and may star in the series.

With the artist Laurie Anderson and the producer Laura Michalchyshyn, Selvaratnam is a co-founder of The Federation, which she describes as "an unprecedented coalition of artists, organizations, and allies committed to keeping cultural borders open and showing how art unites us". The Federation was formed in response to the Trump travel ban. One year after Trump was inaugurated, the Federation and various artists held an Art Action Day.

Selvaratnam has produced for Joy To The Polls. She has engaged in media relations for the Rubell Family Collection in Miami. As an actor, she performed in “The Shape of Things,” a day of workshops and performances at the Park Avenue Armory in New York City. As an activist, Selvaratnam has worked with the Third Wave Foundation, the NGO Forum on Women, the World Health Organization, and the Ms. Foundation for Women.

In 2020, Selvaratnam was a volunteer for the Biden-Harris Policy Committee and also served as Content Chair of Arts for the campaign.

== Personal life ==
From 2016 to 2017, Selvaratnam dated New York Attorney General Eric Schneiderman. The two first met at the 2016 Democratic National Convention. In May 2018, Selvaratnam and other women made allegations of physical abuse against Schneiderman; The New Yorker published a report on their allegations. Three hours after the allegations were made public, Schneiderman resigned from his office. Selvaratnam recounted her experience with Schneiderman in her 2020 book, Assume Nothing: A Story of Intimate Violence.

== Bibliography ==
=== Books ===
- The Big Lie: Motherhood, Feminism, and the Reality of the Biological Clock (2014)
- Assume Nothing: A Story of Intimate Violence (2021)

== Filmography ==
- What's On Your Plate? (2009)
- Happy Birthday to a Beautiful Woman (2013)
- Born to Fly (2014)
- UNSTOPPABLE (for Planned Parenthood) (2018)
- GLAMOUR Women of the Year (2017-ongoing)
- AGGIE (2020)
- SURGE (2020)
- Love to the Max (2024)
