= El enamorado =

- Directed by: Miguel Zacarías
- Written by: Álvaro Gálvez y Fuentes; Paulino Masip; Miguel Zacarías
- Starring: Pedro Infante; Sara Montiel; Eulalio González "Piporro"
- Cinematography: Gabriel Figueroa
- Edited by: José W. Bustos
- Music by: Manuel Esperón
- Production company: Producciones Zacarías
- Distributed by: Producciones Zacarías
- Release date: 5 September 1952
- Country: Mexico
- Language: Spanish

The Lover (Spanish: El enamorado, alternately known as Vuelve Martin Corona) is a 1952 Mexican comedy western film directed by Miguel Zacarías and starring Pedro Infante, Sara Montiel and Eulalio González "Piporro". It is the sequel to the film of the same year, Here Comes Martin Corona.

== Cast ==
- Pedro Infante as Martín Corona
- Sara Montiel as Rosario
- Eulalio González as Piporro
- Armando Silvestre as Emeterio
- Florencio Castelló as Serafín Delgado
- José Pulido as Diego
- Irma Dorantes as Gloria
- Armando Sáenz as Tomás
- Ángel Infante as Nacho
- Guillermo Calles as Cuervo
- Fanny Schiller as Anfitriona fiesta
- Julio Ahuet
- Salvador Quiroz
- José Alfredo Jiménez
- Blanca Marroquín
- Armando Velasco
- Antonio R. Frausto as the doctor
- Marcela Zacarias
- Antonio Bribiesca
- Elisa Zacarias
- Mariachi Vargas
