= Rosa de Castilla =

Mexican singer and actress (1931–2022)

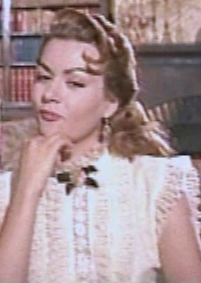
- Rosa de Castilla in Yo... el aventurero (1959)
- Born: María Victoria Ledesma Cuevas; 30 May 1932; Encarnación de Díaz, Jalisco, Mexico
- Died: 1 August 2022 (aged 90)
- Occupations: Singer, actress
- Musical career
- Genres: Ranchera; mariachi; bolero; ballad
- Instrument: Vocals
- Labels: Capitol; RCA Víctor; Musart

María Victoria Ledesma Cuevas (30 May 1932 – 1 August 2022), known by her stage name Rosa de Castilla (Spanish pronunciation: [ˈrosa ðe kasˈtiʎa]), was a Mexican actress and singer, specialized in the musical genres of ranchera, mariachi, bolero and ballad. She was noted as one of the great folkloric leading artists of the "golden age" of Mexican cinema.

== Career ==
=== Acting ===
De Castilla made her film debut in Julián Soler's Los tres alegres compadres (1952), starring Jorge Negrete, Pedro Armendáriz, and Andrés Soler.

As the second female lead after Flor Silvestre, she co-starred in a western trilogy: El lobo solitario, La justicia del lobo, and Vuelve el lobo (all in 1952).

In 1954, she was nominated for an Ariel Award for Best Actress in a Minor Role for Rogelio A. González's Tal para cual (1953). She starred as the female lead in two films in Eastmancolor: Ismael Rodríguez's Mexican Revolution drama Tierra de hombres (1956), her first color film, and Jaime Salvador's musical comedy ¡Aquí están los aguilares! (1957). Other notable films she appeared in during the late 1950s are the Mexiscope productions of Yo... el aventurero (1959) and Tan bueno el giro como el colorado (1959). She played the ranchera singer wife of Demetrio González in Dos corazones y un cielo (1959).

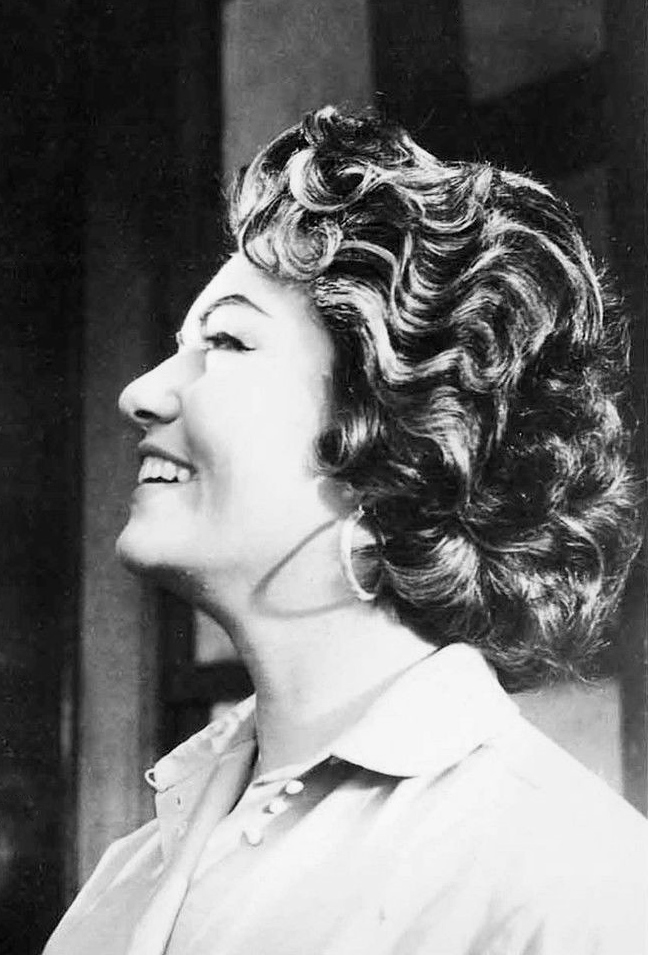
De Castilla in Bala de Plata en el pueblo maldito (1960)

In the 1960s, she starred in mostly westerns or comedies such as Héroe a la fuerza (1964), co-starring Eulalio González and Sara García.

By the early 1970s, her career had waned, though she made some comebacks in the late 1990s.

=== Singing ===
De Castilla sang ranchera songs in most of her films. In 1956, Capitol Records released her album The Sounds of Old Mexico, which also featured Antonio Aguilar, Luis Pérez Meza, and Rosita Quintana. In 1967, she signed with RCA Víctor; her records were "beginning to sell" in Australia that same year.

== Filmography ==
=== Film ===
- The Three Happy Compadres (1952)
- The Lone Wolf (1952)
- The Justice of the Wolf (1952)
- The Wolf Returns (1952)
- Hot Rhumba (1952)
- Made for Each Other (1953)
- The Unknown Mariachi (1953)
- Sandunga para tres (1954)
- Contigo a la distancia (1954)
- The Seven Girls (1955)
- Tierra de hombres (1956)
- Here Are the Aguilares! (1957)
- La virtud desnuda (1957)
- Desnúdate, Lucrecia (1958)
- Tres desgraciados con suerte (1958)
- El jinete solitario en el valle de los buitres (1958)
- Milagros de San Martín de Porres (1959)
- Yo... el aventurero (1959) as Gloria Cisneros
- Tan bueno el giro como el colorado (1959)
- Cada quién su música (1959)
- Dos corazones y un cielo (1959) as Isabel del Río
- Dos gallos en palenque (1960)
- Me importa poco (1960)
- Bala de Plata en el pueblo maldito (1960)
- The Hell of Frankenstein (1960) as Estela
- Northern Courier (1960)
- The Mask of Death (1961)
- ¡Mis abuelitas... no más! (1961)
- La comezón del amor (1961)
- Ay Chabela...! (1961)
- La justicia de los Villalobos (1961)
- Pueblo de odios (1962)
- Aquí están los Villalobos (1962)
- Los forajidos (1962)
- Horizontes de sangre (1962)
- Ahí vienen los Argumedo (1962)
- Vuelven los Argumedo (1963)
- Héroe a la fuerza (1964) as Lucha
- Diablos en el cielo (1965)
- Aquella Rosita Alvírez (1965)
- El tigre de Guanajuato: Leyenda de venganza (1965)
- Pistoleros del oeste (1965)
- El jinete justiciero en retando a la muerte (1966)
- Los amores de Juan Charrasqueado (1968)
- Cuatro hombres marcados (1968)
- El asesino enmascarado (1970)
- El pueblo del terror (1970) (uncredited)
- Campeones del ring (1972)
- Las nenas de quinto patio (1995)
- Reclusorio III (1999)
- La paloma de Marsella (1999)

=== Television ===
- Los hijos de nadie (1996) as Amparo Valencia
