= Ella (song) =

Song by José Alfredo Jiménez

"Ella" is a Spanish-language song, a vals mexicano composed by José Alfredo Jiménez in the 40s. Jiménez started to write the song at the age of 18 after a broken romance. The lyrics begin "Me cansé de rogarle...".

In 1948, while he was working as waiter in a restaurant called La Sirena, in Santa María de la Rivera, he met the singer Miguel Aceves Mejía. He then asked him to hear some of his songs, since he was also a composer. They agreed to meet at the Radio Station XEW, where the singer had an audition called Amanecer Ranchero. A few days later, José Alfredo arrived to the radio and started singing his songs "Ella" and some more. Miguel was impressed and promised to support him and record his songs.

Versions include those by:

- Miguel Aceves Mejía
- Pedro Infante
- Jorge Negrete
- José Alfredo Jiménez
- Mario Talavera
- A virtual duet with Jiménez and Cristian Castro, 1998 (also included on Castro's 2002 compilation album "Grandes Hits")
