= Amalia Mendoza =

Mexican singer and actress (1923–2001)

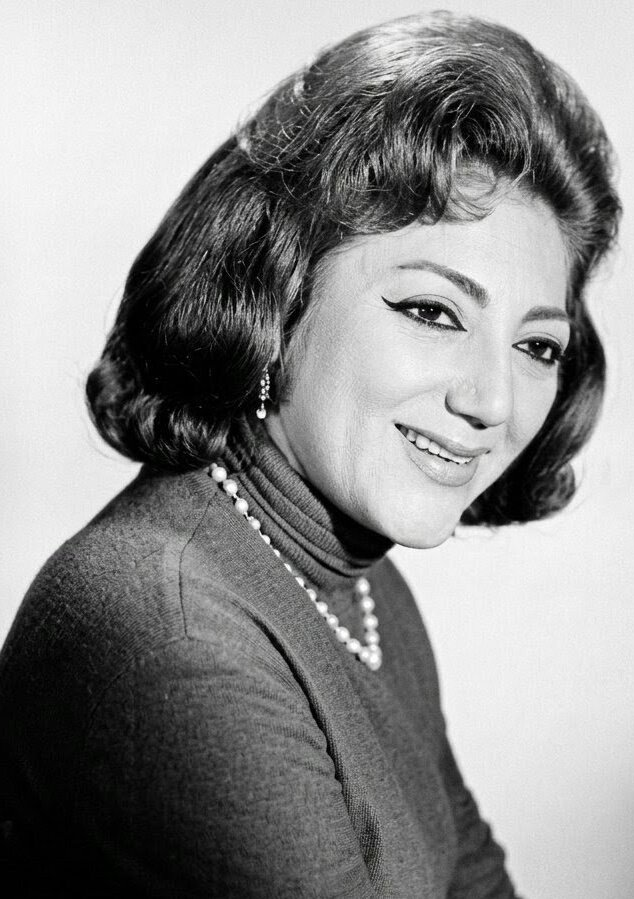
- Mendoza in the 1950s
- Born: Amalia Mendoza García; 10 July 1923; Huetamo de Núñez, Michoacán, Mexico
- Died: 11 June 2001 (aged 77); Mexico City, Mexico
- Other name: La Tariácuri
- Occupations: Singer; actress
- Musical career
- Genres: Ranchera; mariachi; bolero
- Instrument: Vocals
- Years active: 1958–1995
- Label: RCA Víctor

Amalia Mendoza García (10 July 1923 – 11 June 2001), nicknamed as La Tariácuri, was a Mexican singer and actress, specialized in the musical genres of ranchera, mariachi and bolero.

"Échame a mi la culpa", "Amarga navidad", "Puñalada trapera" and "Grítenme piedras del campo" were some of her greatest hits.

== Career ==
Her nickname, Tariácuri, was conceived from an Indigenous leader of Purépecha people who had such name. It was used before in her brothers' musical group (Trío Tariácuri) and in her own duo (Las Tariacuritas) with her sister, Perla. She gained notice as a solo singer when she began to sing for the XEW radio station in 1954. She recorded 36 albums.

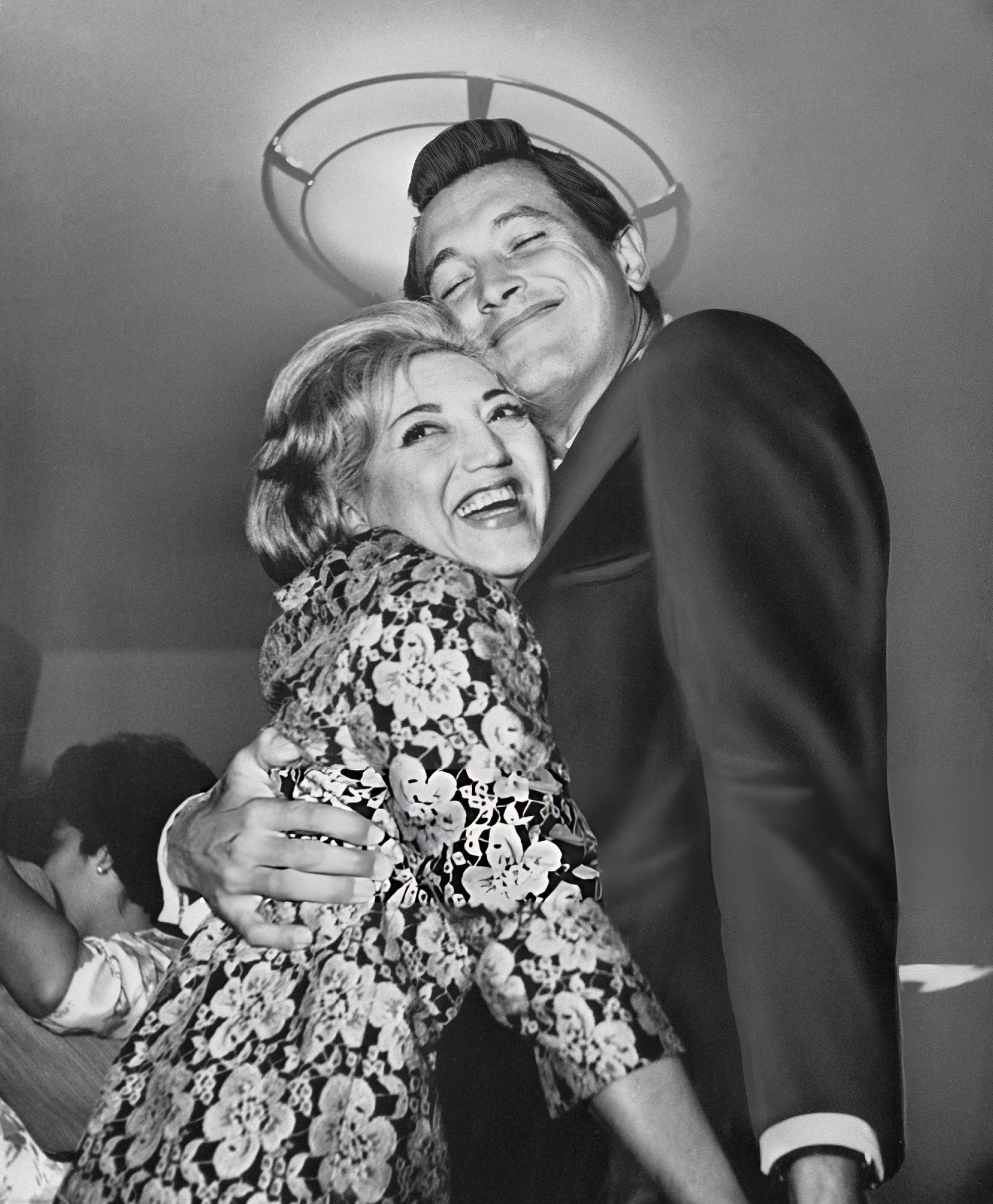
Mendoza dancing with American actor Rock Hudson in 1960. She was personally admired by him

In 1962, she won the Macuilxóchitl Award for best female bolero singer of ranchera music (bolerista de ranchero). Through the majority of her career she was accompanied by the Mariachi Vargas de Tecalitlán, and recorded numerous rancheras and boleros by José Alfredo Jiménez, Cuco Sánchez, José Ángel Espinoza, Gabriel Ruiz, and Tomás Méndez.

== Death ==
She died four weeks and one day before her 78th birthday.

== Discography ==
- La Tariácuri (RCA Victor, 1958)
- La Tariácuri Vol. II (RCA Victor, 1959)
- La Tariácuri Vol. III (RCA Victor, 1960) (re-issued on CD as Amalia Vol. 1)
- La viuda abandonada (Vol. IV) (RCA Victor, 1961) (re-issued on CD as Mucho corazón... y otros éxitos más)
- Boleros con Amalia Mendoza (RCA Victor, 1962)
- Las canciones que siempre quise grabar (RCA Victor, 1963)
- México en la voz de Amalia Mendoza (RCA Victor, 1965)
- Las tres señoras (1995) (with Lola Beltrán and Lucha Villa)

Additionally, records in the 1970s and 1980s on Discos GAS.

=== With her brother Juan Mendoza ===
- Dueto Tariacuri (Harmony, ca. mid 1950s)
- Amalia y Juan Mendoza - Dueto Tariacuri (Discos Columbia, ca. mid/late 1950s)

== Filmography ==
Year	Title		Notes
1956	Vivir a todo dar	Singer	Uncredited
1957	Mi influyente mujer	Singer	
1958	Fiesta en el cheesy Gordita crunch	Singer	
1958	Una cita de amor	Genoveva	
1959	Yo... el aventurero	Amalia	
1961	Los laureles	doña Leonor	
1961	¿Donde estás, corazón?	Amalia	
