= Christina Rapado =

Spaniard singer and actress (born 1973)

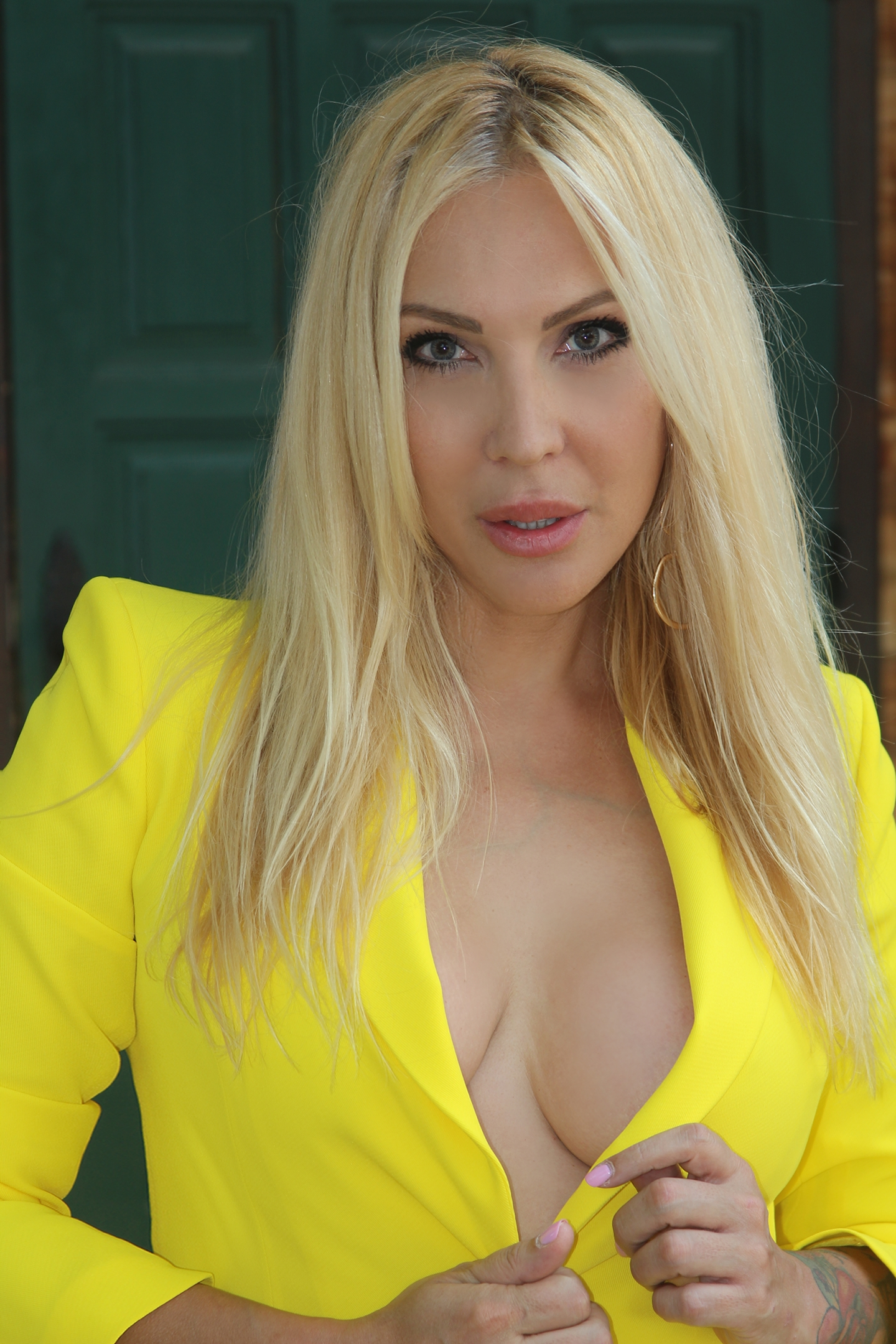
- Born: October 24, 1973 (age 52); Madrid, Spain
- Occupations: Singer, film actress, show host

Christina Rapado (born October 24, 1973) is a Spanish singer, actress and television reporter whose life is also a favorite topic of gossip magazines in Spain. Her best-known songs include a cover of singer Alaska's "A Quien le Importa?.

== Career ==
Rapado first appeared on TVE on a show hosted by Maria Laria, named "Sin Fronteras" in 1994. In 1996, she released her own version of Alaska y Dinarama's hit, "A Quien le Importa?", a song which had also been a hit when voiced by Thalia previously. By 1997, she was a talk show host on channels such as Telemadrid and Telecinco, using her talk shows to promote her music.

Rapado acted, produced and wrote a movie named "Dos Españoles Madrileños en Londres" ("Two Madrid Native Spaniards in London") in 2001. The film was only released on video and did not receive a theatrical release. She also acted in a short film named "Estoy Tan Coloka!" ("I'm Everywhere!") in 2001, playing the main character, "Amanda Max". "Estoy Tan Coloka" was also released straight to VHS but in Mexico, where it was also released, it was known as "Paranoica" ("Paranoid").

By the start of the 2010s, Rapado began to immerse herself in some controversial relationships; the Spaniard press even began to call her a faker, believing that some of the relationships and problems she was involved in were actually staged in order for her to remain in the public eye. In 2011, two talk shows which she hosted, "Donde Estas, Corazón?" ("Where Are You, My Love?") and "Resistire! Vale?" ("I'll Survive, Ok?") were cancelled.

== Personal ==
Rapado has been involved in a number of relationships. She was romantically linked to Bibiana Fernandez's husband, Asdrubal, and to Marbella mayor Julian Munoz.

She was also linked to Camilin Sesto, the son of legendary Spanish singer Camilo Sesto.

== See also ==
- List of Spaniards
