= Cuando sale la luna =

Studio album by Pedro Infante
- Released: 1952
- Genre: Ranchera
- Label: Peerless

Cuando sale la luna (translated, "When the moon comes out") is an album by the Mexican ranchera singer and actor Pedro Infante. The album was released in 1952 on the Peerless Records label. Three of the songs, including the title track, were written by José Alfredo Jiménez. Guillermo Kornhauser, the artistic director at Peerless, played a key role in selecting the songs for the album.

In a 2024 ranking of the 600 greatest Latin American albums, Cuando sale la luna was ranked No. 46. Reviewer José Luis Mercado called it "a timeless treasure of Mexican music and represents an iconic moment in the career of this legendary singer and actor."

== Track listing ==
Side A

1. Cuando Sale La Luna (José Alfredo Jiménez)
2. Un Mundo Raro (José Alfredo Jiménez)
3. El Tren Sin Pasajero (Tomás Méndez Sosa)
4. Tu Vida Mi Vida (A. Cervantes, R. Fuentes)

Side B

1. Tu Y Las Nubes (José Alfredo Jiménez)
2. El Ultimo Aviso (Gasson, R. Cárdenas)
3. Mi Nave (M. Alvarez, Pedro Rigual)
4. Tu Que Mas Quieres (Claudio Estrada
