= Here Comes Martin Corona =

1952 film

- Directed by: Miguel Zacarías
- Written by: Álvaro Gálvez y Fuentes; Paulino Masip
- Produced by: Antonio Matouk; Miguel Zacarías
- Starring: Pedro Infante; Sara Montiel; Eulalio González "Piporro"
- Cinematography: Gabriel Figueroa
- Edited by: José W. Bustos
- Music by: José Alfredo Jiménez
- Production company: Producciones Zacarías
- Distributed by: Producciones Zacarías
- Release date: 23 May 1952
- Running time: 87 minutes
- Country: Mexico
- Language: Spanish

Here Comes Martin Corona, also known by the alternative title of Little Love of My Life (Spanish: Ahí viene Martín Corona) is a 1952 Mexican comedy western film directed by Miguel Zacarías and starring Pedro Infante, Sara Montiel and Eulalio González "Piporro". It was followed by a sequel filmed in the same year, El enamorado. It was shot at the Churubusco Studios in Mexico City. The film's sets were designed by the art director Luis Moya.

== Cast ==
- Pedro Infante as Martín Corona
- Sara Montiel as Rosario
- Eulalio González as Piporro
- Armando Silvestre as Emeterio
- Florencio Castelló as Serafín Delgado
- José Pulido as Diego
- Ángel Infante as Lencho
- José Alfredo Jiménez
- Antonio Bribiesca
- Julio Ahuet
- Antonio Manuel Arjona
- Guillermo Calles
- Emilio Garibay
- Blanca Marroquín
- Miguel A. Peña
- Armando Sáenz
- José Torvay
- Armando Velasco
- Acela Vidaurri

== Bibliography ==
- Rogelio Agrasánchez. Cine Mexicano: Posters from the Golden Age, 1936-1956. Chronicle Books, 2001.
