= Mexiscope =

Mexican cinematic process

Mexiscope was a cinematic process used in various Mexican film productions, specifically by Producciones Rosas Priego and Rosas Films, intended to widen the screen format. This process' color was provided by Eastmancolor.

== Films using Mexiscope ==
- Pulgarcito (1957), with Cesáreo Quezadas
- La guarida del buitre (1958), with Antonio Aguilar
- Los muertos no hablan (1958), with Antonio Aguilar and Flor Silvestre
- Tan bueno el giro como el colorado (1959), with Luis Aguilar, Demetrio González, Flor Silvestre, and Rosa de Castilla
- Yo... el aventurero (1959), with Antonio Aguilar and Rosa de Castilla
- Santa Claus (1959), with José Elías Moreno and Cesáreo Quezadas
- Música de ayer (1959), with Ana María Olaria and Armando Calvo
- Cielo Rojo (1962), with Rodolfo de Anda and Patricia Conde
- Sol en llamas (1962), with Antonio Aguilar and Maricruz Olivier
- La risa de la ciudad (1963), with José Elías Moreno, Joaquín Cordero, and Alma Delia Fuentes
