= Humberto Rodríguez Silva =

- Born: August 14, 1908; Guantánamo, Cuba
- Died: April 3, 1952 (aged 43) Havana, Cuba
- Genres: Guaracha, afro, bolero
- Occupation(s): Songwriter, judge
- Years active: 1930s-1952

Humberto Rodríguez Silva (August 14, 1908 – April 3, 1952) was a Cuban songwriter and judge. He composed many popular afros and guarachas such as "La negra Cacha", "Se me rompió el bongó" and "A caridad le da santo", as well as boleros such as "Pecador". He also wrote numerous soundtracks for Cuban and American films, such as When Women Rule.

Born in Guantánamo, Rodríguez Silva studied law at the University of Havana and later worked as a judge in the town of Yateras, near Guantánamo. At the same time, he decided to pursue a career as a songwriter, and became famous for his guarachas. In 1943, a special concert devoted to his music was held in Havana, where his songs were performed by Zoraida Marrero & Alicia Llorente, Trío Cancioneras del Caribe, Panchita Trigo, Delia Casanova and Sara Santana, and presented by musicologist José Luis Vidaurreta.
