= Federico Piñero =

Cuban actor

- Born: 3 March 1903; Santa Clara, Villa Clara, Cuba
- Died: 2 November 1961 (aged 58); Miami, Florida, United States
- Occupation: Actor
- Years active: 1938–1958 (film)

Federico Piñero (1903–1961) was a Cuban actor, comedian and singer. He appeared in films during the Golden Age of Mexican Cinema as well as Cuban productions.

== Selected filmography ==
- Sucedió en La Habana (1938)
- The Rebel (1943)
- The Daughter of the Regiment (1944)
- Marina (1945)
- Caribbean Enchantment (1947)
- School for Models (1949)
- When Women Rule (1951)

== Bibliography ==
- Osuna, Alfonso J. García . The Cuban Filmography: 1897 through 2001. McFarland, 2003.
- Verdeja, Sam & Martínez, Guillermo. Cubans, an Epic Journey: The Struggle of Exiles for Truth and Freedom. Reedy Press, 2011.
