= When Women Rule =

1951 film

- Directed by: Joseph P. Mawra
- Written by: José Fernández; Armando Pérez-Blanco
- Starring: Federico Piñero; Alberto Garrido; Germán Valdés
- Cinematography: Enrique Bravo; Ricardo Delgado
- Edited by: Mario González
- Production company: Producciones Alejo y Mederos
- Release date: 1951
- Running time: 93 minutes
- Country: Cuba
- Language: Spanish

When Women Rule (Spanish: Cuando las mujeres mandan) is a 1951 Cuban musical comedy film directed by Joseph P. Mawra and starring Federico Piñero, Alberto Garrido and Germán Valdés "Tin-Tan". The Mexican star Valdés, also known as Tin Tan, was loaned out by his Mexican studio for the film.

The soundtrack for the film was composed by Humberto Rodríguez Silva and Osvaldo Estivil.

== Plot ==
Two Cuban soldiers fighting in the Korean War decide to desert and steal a plane which they end up crash landing on a tropical island. They find it is a militaristic female-dominated society where men are treated as second-class citizens. They are promptly imprisoned. After a series of adventures they eventually take part in a revolution.

== Partial cast ==
- Aidita Artigas
- Xonia Benguría
- Marcelo Chávez
- Emilita Dago
- Alberto Garrido
- Fela Jar
- Jorge Montalvan
- Armando Orefiche
- Federico Piñero
- Sandra
- Olga Uz
- Germán Valdés "Tin-Tan"

== Bibliography ==
- Alfonso J. García Osuna. The Cuban Filmography: 1897 through 2001. McFarland, 2003.
