= Héroe a la fuerza =

- Directed by: Miguel M. Delgado
- Written by: José María Fernández Unsáin; Eulalio González «Piporro»
- Produced by: Jesús Sotomayor Martínez
- Starring: Eulalio González «Piporro» Rosa de Castilla; Sara García; Lola Casanova.
- Cinematography: Raúl Martínez Solares
- Edited by: Carlos Savage
- Music by: Gustavo César Carrión
- Release date: 1964
- Running time: 85 minutes
- Country: Mexico
- Language: Spanish

Héroe a la fuerza ("Hero in the Force") is a 1964 Mexican drama comedy film directed by Miguel M. Delgado and starring Eulalio González «Piporro», Rosa de Castilla, Sara García and Lola Casanova. This is the only film in which Castilla does not play music themes on scene.

== Cast ==
- Eulalio González «Piporro» as Caín / Abel
- Rosa de Castilla as Lucha
- Sara García as Doña Prudencia
- Óscar Pulido as Physician
- Lola Casanova as Juana
- David Reynoso
- Arturo Castro «Bigotón» as Sheriff
- José Luis Fernández
- Nathanael León «Frankenstein»
- José Chávez
- Alejandro Reyna «Tío Plácido» as Bartender
- Ramón Valdés as Caín and Abel's father
- Armando Gutiérrez as Physician
- Roberto Meyer as Physician
- Víctor Alcocer as School director
- Emilio Garibay
- Enrique García Álvarez
- Carlos León
- José Pardavé
- René Barrera
- Manuel Alvarado
- Jesús Gómez
- Vicente Lara
- Leonor Gómez
