= Demetrio González =

Mexican actor and singer (1927–2015)

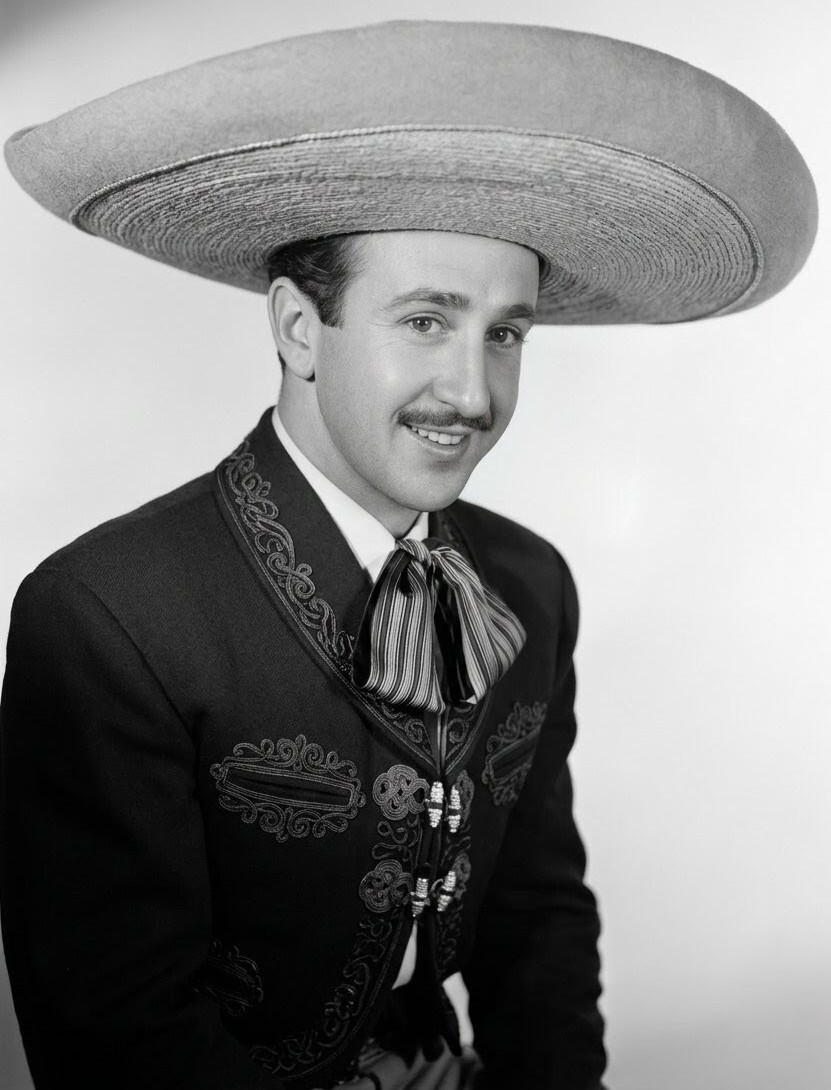
- Demetrio González in the 1950s
- Born: 7 October 1927; Asturias, Spain
- Died: 25 January 2015 (aged 87); Tepoztlán, Morelos, Mexico
- Other name: El Charro Español
- Occupations: Singer and actor
- Years active: 1956-1968

Demetrio González (7 October 1927 – 25 January 2015) was a Spanish-born Mexican film actor and singer of ranchera music. Born in Asturias, Spain, he is sometimes called El Charro Español. He has starred in ranchera-music films from 1955 to 1968. Dos Corazones y un Cielo (1959), in which he co-starred with Rosa de Castilla and Eulalio González, is one of his most notable films. He died after a stroke in Tepoztlán, Morelos, Mexico in 2015. aged 87.

== Selected filmography ==
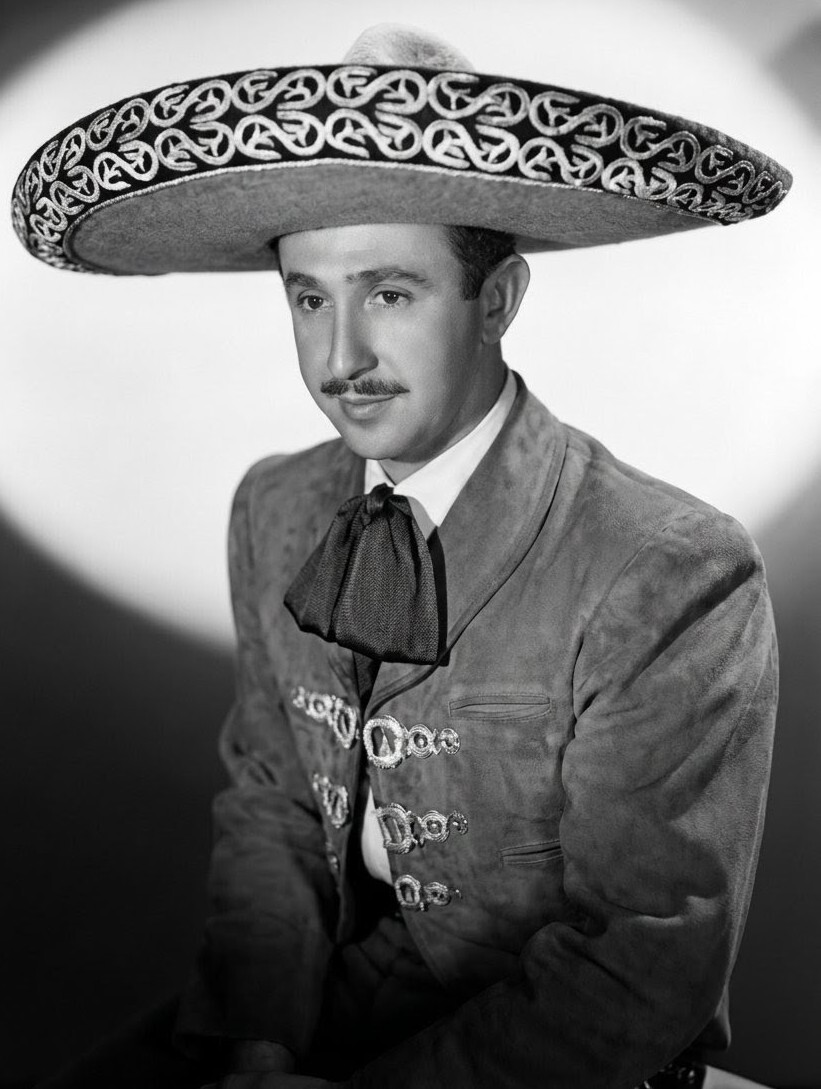
Demetrio González in a photograph taken in the 1950s

- Every Child a Cross to Bear (1957) ... Raymundo
- Guitarras de Medianoche (1958)
- Dos Corazones y un Cielo (1959) ... Antonio Castillo
- Two Cheap Husbands (1960)
- Cada Oveja Con Su Pareja (1965) ... Ángel
