= School for Models =

1949 Cuban film

- Directed by: José Fernández
- Release date: 1949
- Country: Cuba
- Language: Spanish

School for Models (Spanish: Escuela de modelos) is a 1949 Cuban comedy film directed by José Fernández.

== Partial cast ==
- Xonia Benguría
- Alberto Garrido
- Federico Piñero

== Bibliography ==
- Arturo Agramonte & Luciano Castillo. Ramón Peón, el hombre de los glóbulos negros. Editorial de Ciencias Sociales, 2003.
