= Marina (1945 film) =

1945 film

- Directed by: Jaime Salvador
- Written by: José Revueltas; Fernando A. Rivero; Carlos Sampelayo; Neftali Beltrán
- Produced by: Alexander Salkind; Michael Salkind
- Starring: Tito Guízar; Amanda Ledesma; Federico Piñero
- Cinematography: Agustín Martínez Solares
- Music by: Rodolfo Halffter
- Production company: Procimex
- Release date: 21 June 1945
- Country: Mexico
- Language: Spanish

Marina is a 1945 Mexican musical drama film directed by Jaime Salvador and starring Tito Guízar, Amanda Ledesma and Federico Piñero. The film's sets were designed by the art director Manuel Fontanals.

== Cast ==
- Tito Guízar as Jorge
- Amanda Ledesma as Marina
- Federico Piñero as Roque
- Consuelo Guerrero de Luna as Teresa
- Ernesto Alonso as Pascual
- Rosita Segovia
- Conchita Carracedo as Juana
- Antonio Palacios
- Fernando Fernández as Alberto
- José Elías Moreno as Capitán
- Luis Mussot
- Fernando M. del Valle]
- María Elena Garcia
- Cecilia Becerra
- Luis Mussot hijo
- Daniel Pastor
- Humberto Rodríguez
- Carmelita González as Pueblerina

== Bibliography ==
- Emilio García Riera. Historia del cine mexicano. Secretaría de Educación Pública, 1986.
