= Corner Stop =

- Directed by: Alejandro Galindo
- Written by: Alejandro Galindo
- Starring: David Silva; Fernando Soto; Olga Jiménez
- Cinematography: José Ortiz Ramos
- Edited by: Fernando Martínez
- Music by: Nacho Garcia; Raúl Lavista; Felipe Bermejo
- Production company: Producciones Rodríguez Hermanos
- Release date: 13 August 1948
- Country: Mexico
- Language: Spanish

Corner Stop (Spanish:Esquina, bajan...!) is a 1948 Mexican romantic comedy film directed by Alejandro Galindo and starring David Silva, Fernando Soto "Mantequilla" and Olga Jiménez. The film's sets were designed by the art director Gunther Gerszo. It is set in urban Mexico, which was growing rapidly in that era. The title refers to a bus route.

== Partial cast ==
- David Silva as Gregorio del Prado
- Fernando Soto "Mantequilla" as Constantino Reyes Almanza "Regalito"
- Olga Jiménez as Cholita
- Delia Magaña as La Bicha, mesera
- Salvador Quiroz as Don Octaviano Lara y Puente
- Miguel Manzano as Axcaná González
- Francisco Pando as Fidel Yáñez
- Eugenia Galindo as Doña Chabela
- Jorge Arriaga as Robles, esbirro de Langarica
- Ángel Infante as Menchaca 'Rayito de Sol'
- Mario Castillo
- Pin Crespo as Isabel
- Pedro León as Don Roque
- Carmen Novelty as Pasajera rubia falsa
- Joaquín Roche as Policía
- Ernesto Finance as Despachador
- Jorge Martínez de Hoyos as Rabanito
- Víctor Parra as Manuel Largo Langarica

== Bibliography ==
- Segre, Erica. Intersected Identities: Strategies of Visualisation in Nineteenth- and Twentieth-century Mexican Culture. Berghahn Books, 2007.
