= The Rebel (1943 film) =

1943 film

- Directed by: Jaime Salvador
- Written by: Jean-Paul Malaquais; Jaime Salvador
- Based on: Dubrovsky by Alexander Pushkin
- Produced by: Óscar Dancigers
- Starring: Jorge Negrete; María Elena Marqués; Julio Villarreal
- Cinematography: Raúl Martínez Solares
- Edited by: José W. Bustos
- Music by: Manuel Esperón
- Production company: Águila Films
- Distributed by: Clasa Films Mundiales
- Release date: 25 December 1943
- Running time: 118 minutes
- Country: Mexico
- Language: Spanish

The Rebel (Spanish: El rebelde) is a 1943 Mexican musical drama film directed by Jaime Salvador and starring Jorge Negrete, María Elena Marqués and Julio Villarreal. It was shot at the Clasa Studios in Mexico City. The film's sets were designed by the art director Jorge Fernández. Inspired by the novel Dubrovsky by Alexander Pushkin, it shifted the setting from Russia to Mexico.

== Cast ==
- Jorge Negrete as Juan Manuel de Mendoza
- María Elena Marqués as Ana María de la Vega
- Julio Villarreal as Don Pablo de la Vega
- Miguel Ángel Ferriz as Antonio de Mendoza
- Felipe Montoya as Pedro
- Alfonso Ruiz Gómez as Felipe de Montellano
- Fernando Soto "Mantequilla" as Bandido
- Conchita Gentil Arcos as Criada de don Pablo
- Alfonso Jiménez as José
- Roberto Meyer as Licenciado
- José Muñoz as Sacerdote
- Federico Piñero as Lorenzo Barrera
- Emilia Guiú as Invitada a fiesta
- Alfonso Bedoya as Bandido
- Roberto Cañedo as Invitado a fiesta

== Bibliography ==
- Mraz, John. Looking for Mexico: Modern Visual Culture and National Identity. Duke University Press, 2009.
- Riera, Emilio García. Historia documental del cine mexicano: 1943–1945. Universidad de Guadalajara, 1992.
