= Ángel Infante =

Mexican actor and singer (1914–1987)

Ángel Infante Cruz (Acaponeta, Nayarit, México; 1 October 1914 – Ciudad de México 15 December 1987) was a popular Mexican actor and singer of the Golden Age of Mexican cinema. He appeared in more than 120 films, 47 of which were great successes. In more than 30 films he appeared alongside his younger brother, the actor and singer Pedro Infante, who died in an aviation accident in 1957. Ángel Infante was known for having visited Cuba on eight occasions, and even having presented his pistols as a gift to Fidel Castro. His daughter is the TV actress Sonia Infante. He appeared in films such as The Two Orphans, Corner Stop, Women's Prison, Here Comes Martin Corona, My General's Women, Full Speed Ahead, What Has That Woman Done to You?, The Atomic Fireman, and Love for Sale.

== Filmography ==
- 1948 Flor de caña
- 1948 Ustedes los ricos ... Man who fights with Pepe (uncredited)
- 1948 Enrédate y verás
- 1948 Esquina, bajan...! ... Menchaca 'Rayito de Sol'
- 1949 El gran Calavera ... Employee of Ramiro (uncredited)
- 1949 Canta y no llores... (uncredited)
- 1949 Cara sucia
- 1949 Dicen que soy mujeriego ... Man in the cantina (uncredited)
- 1949 El abandonado ... Gambler (uncredited)
- 1949 El charro y la dama
- 1949 El gran campeón ... Friend of Jorge (uncredited)
- 1949 El seminarista ... Bus passenger (uncredited)
- 1949 En cada puerto un amor (uncredited)
- 1949 Hay lugar para... dos ... Menchaca
- 1949 La hija del penal ... Policeman (uncredited)
- 1949 The Woman I Lost ... Marcial
- 1949 Las puertas del presidio ... Marcial, el Plegao (uncredited)
- 1949 No me quieras tanto... ... Hotel employee (uncredited)
- 1950 Las dos huerfanitas ... Hospital employee (uncredited)
- 1950 Piña madura
- 1950 Cuatro contra el mundo ... Manejador de cervecería
- 1950 Donde nacen los pobres
- 1950 Duel in the Mountains ... Train conductor (uncredited)
- 1950 Guardián, el perro salvador
- 1950 La dama del alba ... Anselmo (uncredited)
- 1950 La posesión ... Rubén
- 1950 Nuestras vidas
- 1950 Pata de palo ... Manuel, mayordomo (uncredited)
- 1950 Pecado de ser pobre ... Factory employee (uncredited)
- 1951 A.T.M. A toda máquina! ... Comandante
- 1951 Amor vendido ... Waiter (uncredited)
- 1951 El siete machos ... Don Guadalupe
- 1951 Las mujeres de mi general ... Sarmiento, el traidor
- 1951 Noche de perdición ... Miembro criminal (uncredited)
- 1951 ¡¿Qué te ha dado esa mujer?! ... Comandante
- 1951 Capitán de rurales ... Rendón
- 1951 Cárcel de mujeres ... Gloria's husband (uncredited)
- 1951 Corazón de fiera ... Benjamín
- 1951 El papelerito ... Driver (uncredited)
- 1951 Ella y yo... Friend of Pedro
- 1951 La estatua de carne (uncredited)
- 1951 La marquesa del barrio ... Zacatecas
- 1951 Pecado ... Invitado (uncredited)
- 1951 Peregrina (uncredited)
- 1951 Sentenciado a muerte
- 1951 Tierra baja ... Pepe
- 1952 Dancing, Salón de baile ... Police detective
- 1952 El bombero atómico ... Policeman
- 1952 Una mujer sin amor ... González (uncredited)
- 1952 Ahí viene Martín Corona ... Lencho
- 1952 Dos caras tiene el destino ... Esbirro de Salcedo
- 1952 El beisbolista fenómeno ... Ramón
- 1952 El enamorado ... Nacho
- 1952 The Lone Wolf ... Raymundo
- 1952 Hay un niño en su futuro (uncredited)
- 1952 Necesito dinero ... Roberto
- 1952 Por ellas aunque mal paguen ... José Manuel Campos
- 1952 Siempre tuya
- 1953 Esos de Pénjamo ... Enrique
- 1954 La sobrina del señor cura ... Tomá Rendón (el Tomasón)
- 1955 Tu vida entre mis manos ... Doctor Pérez
- 1956 Los gavilanes ... Roberto
- 1957 La justicia del gavilán vengador ... Jesús
- 1957 La ley de la sierra
- 1958 Aquí está Heraclio Bernal ... Antonio Bernal
- 1958 El gran premio ... Fernando González
- 1958 El rayo de Sinaloa: La venganza de Heraclio Bernal
- 1958 La guarida del buitre
- 1958 La rebelión de la sierra
- 1958 Los muertos no hablan ... Mayor
- 1958 Los tres vivales ... Ángel Vaca
- 1959 Yo... el aventurero ... Gregorio Carriles
- 1960 Bala de Plata ... Regino
- 1960 Dos gallos en palenque
- 1960 Me importa poco
- 1961 El gato ... Don Pedro Herrera
- 1961 Los inocentes
- 1961 Tirando a matar
- 1964 El rostro de la muerte ... Comisario
- 1964 La banda del fantasma negro
- 1964 Yo, el valiente
- 1966 La vida de Pedro Infante ... Voz de Pedro
- 1974 El desconocido ... Don Julio
