= Qué hombre tan sin embargo =

- Directed by: Julián Soler
- Written by: José María Fernández Unsáin; Gregorio Walerstein; Eulalio González «Piporro»
- Screenplay by: José María Fernández Unsáin
- Produced by: Gregorio Walerstein
- Starring: Eulalio González «Piporro» Julissa; Enrique Rambal; Lucy Gallardo
- Cinematography: Jorge Stahl, Jr.
- Edited by: Rafael Ceballos
- Music by: Manuel Esperón
- Production company: Cima Films
- Release date: 6 April 1967 (Mexico City)
- Running time: 99 minutes
- Country: Mexico
- Language: Spanish

Qué hombre tan sin embargo is a 1967 Mexican comedy-drama film directed by Julián Soler and starring Eulalio González «Piporro», Julissa, Lucy Gallardo and Hilda Aguirre. This film marked the film marked of Aguirre.

== Synopsis ==
An angel, disguised as a witty vagabond named Filomeno and instructed by God, becomes the butler of an affluent and excessively materialistic family.

== Cast ==
- Eulalio González «Piporro» as Filomeno
- Julissa as Laura
- Enrique Rambal as Don Jaime
- Lucy Gallardo as Doña María
- León Michel as Hipólito "Polo"
- Ricardo Carrión as Raúl
- Óscar Ortiz de Pinedo as Lucrecio
- Jessica Munguía as Laura's friend
- Sergio Ramos as a lawyer
- Juan Salido as Jorge
- Silvia Fuentes as Laura's friend
- Conjunto de los Hermanos Carreón as the band at the party
- Hilda Aguirre as Rosa

== Production ==
Principal photography commenced on 25 November 1965 at the Estudios San Ángel in Mexico City and ended on 22 December 1965.

=== Casting ===
The film featured the "accidental" cinematic debut of actress Hilda Aguirre; her father (José María Aguirre) was a friend of producer Gregorio Walerstein. Aguirre's father had told the producer that he had a "half-crazy daughter who wanted to work in cinema." The producer then set up an appointment with Aguirre, made her walk, laugh, and talk, closely observing her, and then told her: "You're hired for three years." She started shooting her scenes in the film in November 1965.

The film also featured Ricardo Carrión's "first role of importance."

== Soundtrack ==
- "El Abuelo Yeh Yeh," written and performed by Eulalio González with Los Hermanos Carrión.
- "Quiereme," written and performed by Eulalio González.
- "Puros Hombres de Delito," written and performed by Eulalio González.
