= Tomorrow I'll Kill Myself =

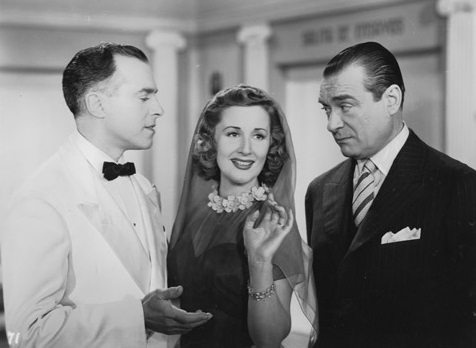
- Directed by: Carlos Schlieper
- Written by: Enrique González Tuñón; Carlos Schlieper
- Starring: Amanda Ledesma; Alberto Vila; Osvaldo Miranda
- Cinematography: Roque Funes
- Edited by: José Cardella
- Music by: Alejandro Gutiérrez del Barrio
- Production company: Establecimientos Filmadores Argentinos
- Distributed by: Establecimientos Filmadores Argentinos
- Release date: 16 September 1942
- Running time: 75 minutes
- Country: Argentina
- Language: Spanish

Tomorrow I'll Kill Myself (Spanish: Mañana me suicido) is a 1942 Argentine musical film of the Golden Age of Argentine cinema, directed and co-written by Carlos Schlieper and starring Amanda Ledesma, Alberto Vila and Osvaldo Miranda.

The film's sets were designed by the art director Juan Manuel Concado.

== Cast ==
- Amanda Ledesma
- Alberto Vila
- Osvaldo Miranda
- Héctor Quintanilla
- Adrián Cuneo
- Carlos Morganti
- Billy Days
- María Esther Álvarez
- Elena Marcó
- Regina Laval
- Chela Alvarado
- Norma del Campo
- Coralito Montes
- Raquel Benítez

== Bibliography ==
- Abel Posadas. Carlos Schlieper. Centro Editor de América Latina, 1994.
