= Tizoc (film) =

1957 film

- Film poster
- Directed by: Ismael Rodríguez
- Written by: Manuel R. Ojeda; Carlos Orellana; Ricardo Parada de León; Ismael Rodríguez
- Produced by: Antonio Matouk
- Starring: Pedro Infante; María Félix
- Cinematography: Fernando Martínez Álvarez
- Edited by: Fernando Martínez Álvarez
- Release date: 23 October 1957
- Running time: 109 minutes
- Country: Mexico
- Language: Spanish

Tizoc is a 1957 Mexican drama film directed by Ismael Rodríguez and starring Pedro Infante and María Félix. It was entered into the 7th Berlin International Film Festival, where Pedro Infante won the Silver Bear for Best Actor. The film also won the Golden Globe Award for Best Foreign Language Film at the 15th Golden Globe Awards. It was to be Infante's last film before his death in a plane crash in 1957.

== Plot ==
In a small village near the Oaxacan sierra in the 19th century, a humble and brave Native trapper named Tizoc prepares himself for his wedding to a fellow Native girl named Machinza. He has an unresolved quarrel with her family (which dates before their births and is due to the enmity of their respective tribes), and also because he is better skilled and can hunt more animals without the need for firearms which ruins their hide. Meanwhile, a Criollo woman named Maria arrives in town with her father, a wealthy cattle driver who wants to check on his businesses. After Tizoc notices it, the town's priest is highly amazed at Maria's striking resemblance to the statue of the Blessed Virgin Mary from the church. When a hunting expedition goes wrong and Tizoc rescues her father, Maria begins to become interested by his demeanor and approach. At first appalled by his apparent lack of civility, she seeks Tizoc in his home near the mountains and eventually falls in love with him, despite the fact that she is already engaged.

When Maria gives Tizoc her handkerchief, he begins to feel a greater love that has grown since he first saw her. As Tizoc begins to realize he no longer loves Machinza, she complains about this to her brother Nicuil. He kills her as he believes her to be a traitor to her family, who is obstinate in ruining Tizoc's reputation. He then decides to go after Tizoc, who kills Nicuil due to his evil action. As Maria sees that her lifestyle doesn't reflect her own goals and as she realizes that she loves Tizoc she decides to go with him to his abode.

Nevertheless, just as they near the cave's entrance that can be their temporary hideout, Cosijope, Machinza's father shoots an arrow aimed at Tizoc, but instead strikes Maria, killing her. Heartbroken, Tizoc grabs the arrow and kills himself by piercing his heart with it.

The film ends with Tizoc's voice repeating an earlier belief that the souls of lovers become nightingales after death.

== Cast ==
- Pedro Infante as Tizoc
- María Félix as María
- Andrés Soler as Fray Bernardo
- Carlos Orellana as Don Pancho García
- Alicia del Lago as Machinza
- Eduardo Fajardo as Arturo
- Julio Aldama as Nicuil
- Miguel Arenas as Don Enrique del Olmo
- Manuel Arvide as Cosijope
- Guillermo Bravo Sosa as Sorcerer
- Polo Ramos
- Paco Crow as Dancer
