= Yo... el aventurero =

- Directed by: Jaime Salvador
- Starring: Antonio Aguilar; Rosa de Castilla; Ángel Infante; Amalia Mendoza; Andrés Soler; Domingo Soler
- Release dates: January 22, 1959 (Mexico City, Mexico)

Yo... el aventurero (English: I... the Adventurer) is a 1959 Mexican ranchera-comedy film directed by Jaime Salvador and starring Antonio Aguilar, Rosa de Castilla, Ángel Infante, Amalia Mendoza, Andrés Soler, and Domingo Soler. This film presents the starring role of the actress and singer Amalia Mendoza. It was shot in Mexiscope, a lens similar to CinemaScope, and it one of the rare color films of the late 1950s.

== Cast ==
- Antonio Aguilar as Antonio Ardabín
- Rosa de Castilla as Gloria Cisneros
- Ángel Infante as Gregorio Carriles
- Amalia Mendoza as Amalia
- Andrés Soler as Guadalupe Cisneros
- Domingo Soler as Manuel Ardabín
- Agustín Isunza as Moncho
- Joaquín García Vargas as Nacho
- Armando Soto La Marina as Nicho
- Paco Michel as Lencho
- Dolores Tinoco as Petra
- Eduardo Pérez as Pascual
- Roberto Meyer as Comandante
- José Luis Fernández as José Luis
- Guillermo Calles as Amalia's confidant
