= Amanda Ledesma =

Argentine film actress and singer

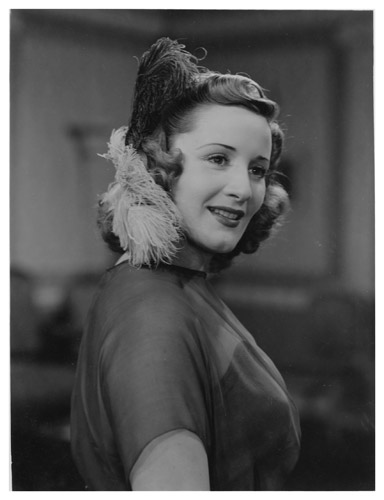
- Ledesma in Tomorrow I'll Kill Myself (1942)
- Born: 31 December 1911; Buenos Aires, Argentina
- Died: 19 February 2000 (aged 88); Buenos Aires, Argentina
- Other name: Josefina Rubianes
- Occupation: Actress
- Years active: 1933-1950 (film)

Amanda Ledesma (December 31, 1911 – February 19, 2000) was an Argentine film actress and singer notable for her work during the Golden Age. Ledesma appeared in several tango films such as The Tango Star (1940). In 1939 she was originally cast to appear in the American film The Sons Command, but did not appear in the final production.

In 1999, she was the recipient of the Career Condor award, given by the Argentinean Film Critics Association Awards.

== Selected filmography ==
- Dancing (1933)
- Paths of Faith (1938)
- The Tango Star (1940)
- De México llegó el amor (1940)
- Tomorrow I'll Kill Myself (1942)
- Marina (1945)
- Cuando quiere un mexicano (1944)

== Bibliography ==
- Waldman, Harry. Hollywood and the Foreign Touch: A Dictionary of Foreign Filmmakers and Their Films from America, 1910-1995.
