= Dos corazones y un cielo =

- Theatrical release poster
- Directed by: Rafael Baledón
- Written by: Rafael Baledón; Carlos Orellana
- Story by: Raúl Zenteno
- Based on: "Dos corazones y un cielo"
- Produced by: Alfonso Rosas Priego
- Starring: Eulalio González «Piporro» Demetrio González; Rosa de Castilla
- Cinematography: Ezequiel Carrasco
- Edited by: Alfredo Rosas Priego
- Music by: Antonio Díaz Conde
- Distributed by: Producciones Rosas Priego
- Release date: 8 October 1959 (Mexico)
- Running time: 70 minutes
- Country: Mexico
- Language: Spanish

Dos corazones y un cielo (English: Two Hearts and One Heaven) is a 1959 Mexican musical-comedy film directed by Rafael Baledón and starring Eulalio González «Piporro» Demetrio González, Rosa de Castilla and Rosa Elena Rangel. This film features the last appearance of Carlos Orellana.

== Plot ==
The married life of singers Antonio Castillo (Demetrio González) and Isabel del Río (Rosa de Castilla) isn't as successful as their professional careers—that is because of their mutual jealousy and criticism. As if things weren't to drastic already, Isabel's cousin Felipe Treviño (Eulalio González) arrives from his hometown after a devastating epidemic and decides to move in with them. After a trip to Santa María del Maíz, Antonio's hometown, Antonio and Isabel find themselves to be the victims of a career separation unintentionally orchestrated by Felipe. Both singers decide to go solo separate ways, Isabel tackles theatre with Spanish businessman César Ordóñez (Carlos Agostí), while Antonio tries luck as a tenor under the instruction of Italian chocolate magnate Dina Castellammare (Rosa Elena Durgel). However Felipe plans cunning ways to join the singers back into matrimonial harmony.

== Cast ==
- Eulalio González as Felipe Treviño
- Demetrio González as Antonio Castillo
- Rosa de Castilla as Isabel del Río
- Rosa Elena Durgel as Dina Castellammare
- Carlos Agostí as César Ordóñez
- Roy Fletcher as Cabaret host
- José Loza as Auditorium representative
- Willie Wilhelmy as Theatrical representative
- Rubén Zepeda Novelo as Television reporter
- Carlos Orellana as Atanacio Turrubiates
- Armando Arriola as Italian art director of "Chocolatitos Milan"
- Polo Ortín as Cabaret waiter
- Aurora Huerta as Hermanita Velázquez (uncredited)
- Luz Huerta as Hermanita Velázquez (uncredited)
- Florencio Castelló as César's attendant (uncredited)
- Jorge Lavat Second auditorium representative (uncredited)
