= Castillos en el aire =

1938 film directed by Jaime Salvador

- Directed by: Jaime Salvador
- Screenplay by: Jaime Salvador
- Produced by: Eddie LeBaron
- Starring: Cristina Téllez; Rafael Alcaide; Pilar Arcos
- Cinematography: Arthur Martinelli
- Edited by: Martin G. Cohn
- Music by: Lee Zahler
- Production company: Eddie Le Baron Productions
- Distributed by: Monogram Pictures
- Release date: April 6, 1938 (US)
- Running time: 58 minutes
- Country: United States
- Language: Spanish

Castillos en el aire (English: Castles in the Air) is a 1938 American Spanish-language comedy-drama film. Directed by Jaime Salvador, the film stars Cristina Téllez, Rafael Alcaide, and Pilar Arcos. It was released on April 6, 1938.

== Plot ==
Lolita Alvarez works as a secretary in a large bank in Europe. When she enters a contest in a local newspaper, she wins a trip to Hollywood, California. Coincidentally, one of her co-workers, Alberto Guzman, has been sent to the United States as well, on business. Lolita asks her aunt, Gertrudis to go with her on the trip, since she has two tickets. On the steamship bound for New York, Lolita hears that a prince is also on board. Determined to meet him, she bribes her way to be seated at the table next to where the prince is expected. However, instead of the prince, Alberto is seated at that table, along with his colleague, Feliciano Roncallo, with whom he is traveling.

Thinking she is flirting with a prince, Lolita lies and tells him that she is a very wealthy heiress, and Gertrudis is her private secretary, traveling the world with her. After several nights, Alberto and Lolita fall in love, but Lolita is guilty about her lies and avoids him until they land in New York. Meanwhile, Gertrudis and Feliciano have also fallen for one another. When they land in New York, the two groups go their separate ways.

Several weeks later, all four are back in Europe, where Lolita is sent by the bank manager to deliver a message to Alberto. When she arrives in his office, she realizes that Alberto is not a prince, and speeds off in embarrassment. Alberto is also confused, thinking Lolita a rich socialite, until he is told by a co-worker that Lolita is merely a secretary at the bank. Distraught, Lolita explains what happened to the bank manager's wife, Doña Mercedes, whom she has been asked to help with an upcoming wedding anniversary party. Mercedes convinces her husband, Don Pedro, to get the couple together, and invite Lolita and Alberto to their wedding anniversary party. Lolita brings Gertrudis, while Alberto is accompanied by Feliciano. The two couples are happily reunited.

== Cast list ==
- Cristina Tellez as Lolita Álvarez
- Rafael Alcaide as Alberto Guzmán
- Pilar Arcos as Tía Gertrudis
- José Peña "Pepet" as Feliciano Roncallo
- Andrés de Segurola as Don Pedro
- Emilia Leovalli as Doña Mercedes
- Consuelo Mendizábal as First typist
- Helena Durán as Second typist
- María Luisa Sierra as Third typist
- Danton Ferrero as First employee

== Production ==
Castillos en el aire was one of a number of Spanish-language films produced by Monogram Pictures as part of a concerted effort to expand its market into Latin America. It was the first of six of these films targeted to the Latin America market in 1938.

== Reception ==
Cine-Mundial, the Spanish-language version of Moving Picture World, gave the film a positive review, calling it "light", "comical", and "unpretentious", and an enjoyable way to spend an hour and a half.
