= Here Are the Aguilares! =

1957 Mexican film

- Directed by: Jaime Salvador
- Written by: Jaime Salvador
- Produced by: Emilio Gómez Muriel
- Starring: Luis Aguilar; Antonio Aguilar; Rosa de Castilla; Lucy Gallardo
- Cinematography: Ezequiel Carrasco
- Edited by: Jorge Bustos
- Music by: Rosalío Ramírez
- Production company: Producciones Corsa S.A.
- Release date: 11 January 1957 (Mexico)
- Country: Mexico
- Language: Spanish

Here Are the Aguilares! (Spanish: ¡Aquí están los Aguilares!) is a 1957 Mexican musical comedy Western film written and directed by Jaime Salvador, and starring Luis Aguilar, Antonio Aguilar, Rosa de Castilla and Lucy Gallardo. The film's sets were designed by art director Jesús Bracho. It is considered among Luis Aguilar's most famous works.

== Plot ==
The Aguilar brothers, Luis and Antonio, arrive at the farm of Anita, the young rich widow of a colonel, whom both try to seduce, while also having to deal with a band of cattle rustlers.

== Cast ==
- Luis Aguilar as Luis
- Antonio Aguilar as Antonio
- Rosa de Castilla as Charito
- Lucy Gallardo
- Armando Soto La Marina
- Joaquín García "Borolas"
- Agustín Isunza
- Julio Villarreal
- Antonio Raxel
- José Eduardo Pérez
- Manuel Arvide
- Francisco Meneses
- José Luis Fernández
- Guillermo Hernández (uncredited)
- Ignacio Peón (uncredited)
- Manuel Vergara (uncredited)

== Production and release ==
Here Are the Aguilares! was filmed from February 1956 at the San Ángel studios. It was released in the Bucareli, Colonial, Popotla and Tacubaya cinemas for one week.

== Reception ==
In his book El actor de cine: arte, mito y realidad, when resuming Luis Aguilar's career, José Alberto Lezcano considered it among Aguilar's most famous works, describing it as one of his "comedies of manners and rural melodramas."

Jaime Salvador's direction has been also singled out. In El cine mexicano, Emilio García Riera states that "what Jaime Salvador directs in this period, one can find everything," while the book El exilio español de 1939 recounts a number of films directed by Salvador during this period, including Here Are the Aguilares!, saying that during this period "Salvador continued to shoot, without inspiration, comedies, musical comedies, adventure films and melodramas."
