= Two Cheap Husbands =

1960 film

- Directed by: Jaime Salvador
- Written by: Jaime Salvador
- Produced by: Alfonso Rosas Priego
- Starring: Lilia Prado; Demetrio González; Julio Aldama
- Cinematography: Ezequiel Carrasco
- Edited by: Alfredo Rosas Priego
- Music by: Antonio Díaz Conde
- Production company: Producciones Rosas Priego
- Release date: 7 July 1960
- Running time: 85 minutes
- Country: Mexico
- Language: Spanish

Two Cheap Husbands (Spanish: Dos maridos baratos) is a 1960 Mexican comedy western film directed by Jaime Salvador and starring Lilia Prado, Demetrio González and Julio Aldama.

== Cast ==
- Lilia Prado
- Demetrio González
- Julio Aldama
- Leonor Llausás
- Fernando Soto "Mantequilla"
- Joaquín García "Borolas"
- José Jasso "El Ojón"
- Consuelo Frank
- Roberto Meyer
- Armando Arriola
- Arturo Castro "Bigotón"
- Roberto Soto hijo
- Don Carlos y Neto

== Bibliography ==
- Emilio García Riera. Historia documental del cine mexicano: 1959-1960. Universidad de Guadalajara, 1994.
