= Los muertos no hablan =

1958 film

- Directed by: Jaime Salvador
- Screenplay by: Jaime Salvador (adaptation)
- Story by: Antonio Guzmán Aguilera; Rodolfo Rosas Priego
- Produced by: Rodolfo Rosas Priego
- Starring: Antonio Aguilar; Flor Silvestre
- Cinematography: Ezequiel Carrasco
- Edited by: Alfredo Rosas Priego
- Music by: Antonio Díaz Conde
- Production company: Rosas Films S.A.
- Release date: August 1, 1958 (Mexico)
- Running time: approx. 90 minutes
- Country: Mexico
- Language: Spanish

Los muertos no hablan (The Dead Do Not Speak) is a 1958 Mexican western film directed by Jaime Salvador, and starring Antonio Aguilar and Flor Silvestre. The film follows another adventure of the rural policeman in a town notoriously known for its band of criminals led by "Alma Negra". It is the seventh installment of the Mauricio Rosales "El Rayo" film series, and the last subsequently until the 1980 film Sabor a sangre. It was filmed in Mexiscope, a rare cinematographic process specially used in productions of Rodolfo Rosas Priego.

== Cast ==
- Antonio Aguilar as Mauricio Rosales
- Flor Silvestre as Alondra
- Rina Valdarno as "La Italiana"
- Sara Montes as Violeta
- Agustín Isunza as Emeterio Berlanga
- Diana Ochoa as Doña Barbara "Alma Negra"
- Ángel Infante as Municipal president
- Daniel 'Chino' Herrera as "Chinito"
- José Eduardo Pérez as Enrique del Olmo
- Roberto Meyer as Don Darío
- Antonio Raxel as Doctor Aceves
- Elena Luquín as Cristina
- José Luis Fernández as "Balasuave"
- Pedro Padilla as Ricardo Mireles
- Mario Sevilla as Hermostenes Rojas
