= Jaime Salvador =

Spanish-Mexican film director and screenwriter

- Born: Jaime Salvador Valls; 4 November 1901
- Died: 18 October 1976 (aged 74)
- Occupations: Film director, screenwriter

Jaime Salvador Valls (4 November 1901 – 18 October 1976) was a Spanish screenwriter and film director of the Golden era of Mexican cinema. He is known for writing and directing various low-budget comedies, westerns, and rancheras.

== Selected filmography ==
- Castillos en el aire (1938)
- The Unknown Policeman (1941, writer only)
- The Rebel (1943)
- The Hunchback / El Jorobado, a.k.a. Henry / Enrique of / de Lagardère (1943–44) : fourth known film version, and the first non-French or French-speaking one, of The Hunchback (Le Bossu), a French novel by Paul Féval in the 19th century, here with Jorge Negrete.
- Gran Hotel (1944, writer only)
- The Daughter of the Regiment (1944)
- Marina (1945)
- A Day with the Devil (1945, writer only)
- Boom in the Moon, aka The Modern-Day Bluebeard (1946)
- I Am a Fugitive (1946, writer only)
- Fly Away, Young Man! (1947, writer only)
- Voices of Spring (1947)
- The Genius (1948, writer only)
- The Magician (1949, writer only)
- My Husband (1951)
- The Guests of the Marquesa (1951)
- The Atomic Fireman (1952, writer only)
- My Adorable Savage (1952)
- The Photographer (1953, writer only)
- Here Are the Aguilares! (1957)
- Se los chupó la bruja (1958)
- Los muertos no hablan (1958)
- Yo... el aventurero (1959)
- Two Cheap Husbands (1960)
- Qué perra vida (1962)
- La señora Muerte (1969)
