= Pedro Infante =

Mexican actor and singer (1917–1957)

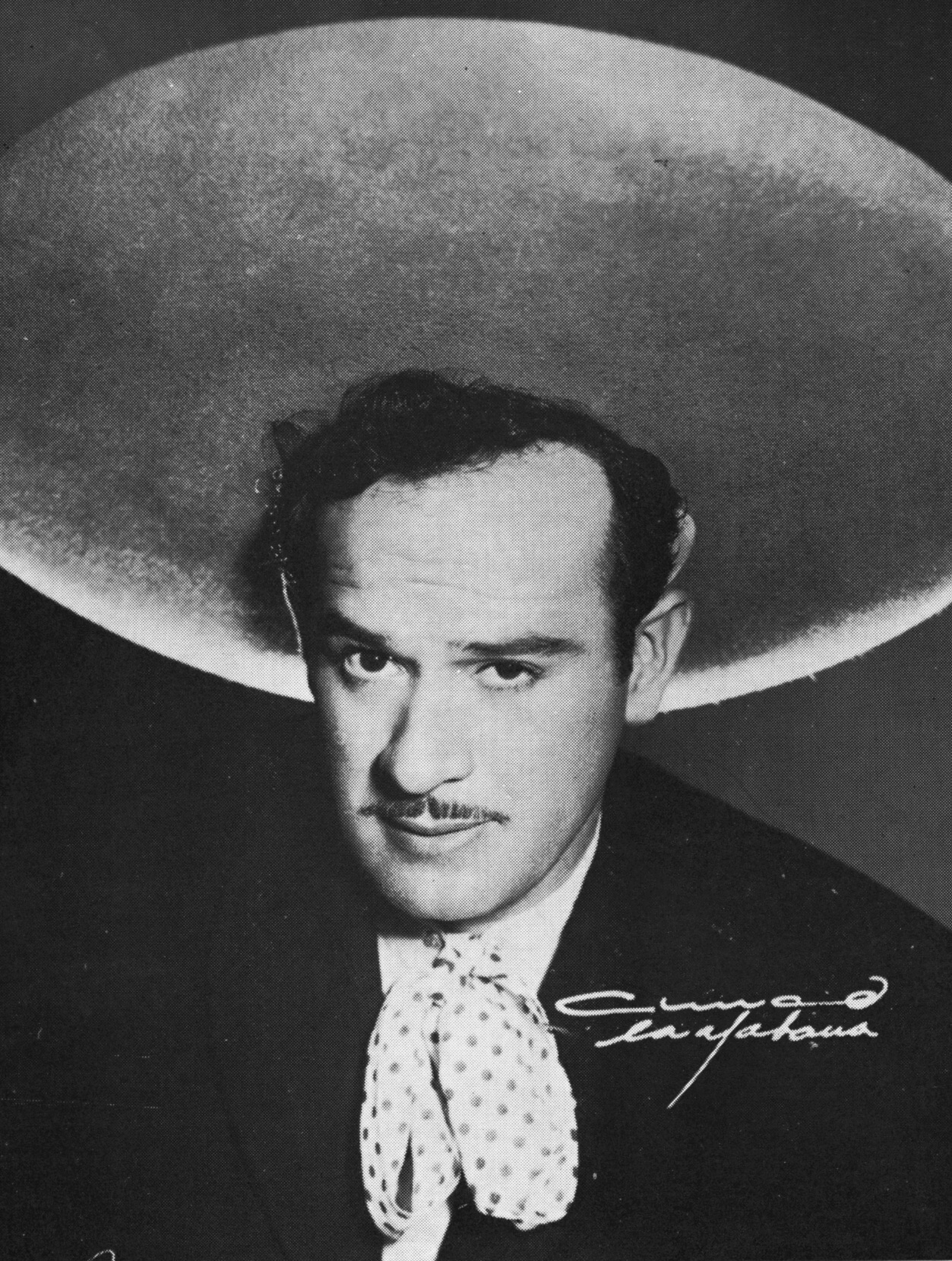
- Infante in 1954
- Born: Pedro Infante Cruz; 18 November 1917; Mazatlán, Sinaloa, México
- Died: 15 April 1957 (aged 39); Mérida, Yucatán, Mexico
- Spouse: Maria Luisa León (m. 1939)
- Partners: Guadalupe López; Lupita Torrentera; Irma Dorantes
- Children: 5
- Relatives: Lupita Infante (granddaughter)
- Musical career
- Occupations: Singer; actor
- Instruments: Classical guitar; piano; violin; trumpet; drums
- Years active: 1939–1957

Pedro Infante Cruz (Spanish: [ˈpeðɾo jɱˈfante]; 18 November 1917 – 15 April 1957) was a Mexican singer and actor, whose career spanned the golden age of Mexican cinema.

Infante was born in Mazatlán, Sinaloa, and raised in nearby Guamúchil. He died on 15 April 1957 in Mérida, Yucatán, while en route to Mexico City when his plane crashed due to engine failure.

From 1939 until his death, Infante acted in over 60 films (30 of them with his brother Ángel) and recorded over 350 songs. His 1952 ranchera album Cuando sale la luna was rated No. 56 in a 2024 ranking of the 600 greatest Latin music albums of all time. For his performance in the movie Tizoc he was posthumously awarded the Silver Bear for Best Actor at the 7th Berlin International Film Festival.

== Childhood and early career ==
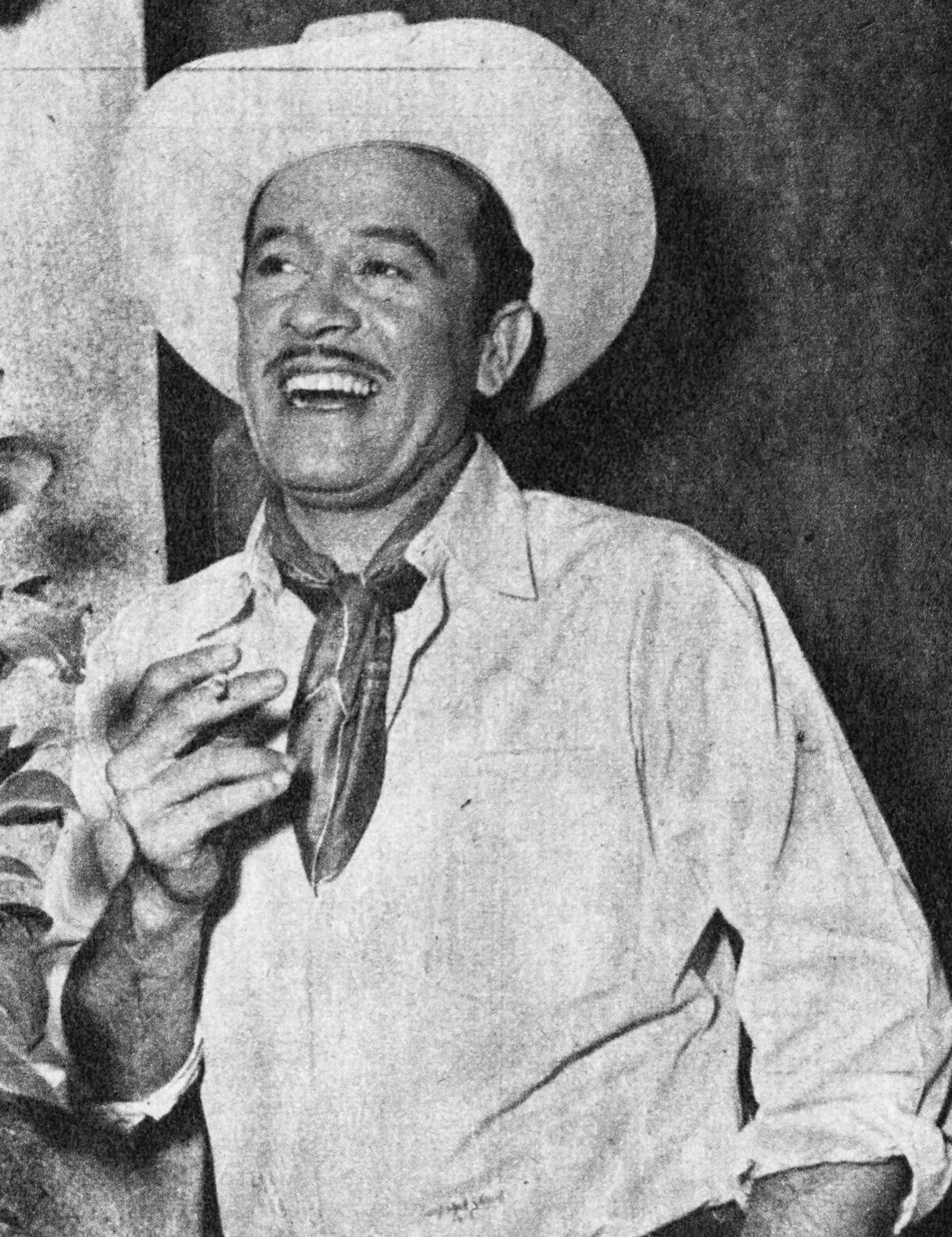
Pedro Infante in 1954

Pedro Infante was born 18 November 1917 in Mazatlán, Sinaloa, the son of Delfino Infante García, who played the double bass in a band, and Maria del Refugio Cruz Aranda. He was the third of his parents' fifteen children, nine of whom survived. Although the Infante Cruz family stayed for some time at Mazatlán, in early 1919 they moved to Guamúchil, where he was raised. As a teen Infante showed talent and affection for music, made his own guitar in a carpenter shop, played in the Luis Ibarra Orchestra led by his father, and formed his own band called La Rabia (The Anger) in 1933. He managed to learn strings, wind, and percussion instruments in a short time, having received music lessons from Carlos R. Hubbard.

He won a charro suit in an amateur contest at the Colonial Theater, singing Vereda tropical. In 1937 he became part of the Orquesta Estrella de Culiacán (Culiacán Star Orchestra) and was a singer, violinist, and drummer for a year and a half.

His wife María Luisa León (who died of cardiac arrest on 27 October 1978) was somewhat well off. According to her memoir Pedro Infante en la intimidad conmigo (1961) (Pedro Infante in intimacy with me), she convinced him to move to Mexico City for better career opportunities in radio. In 1938 at the age of 21, he auditioned for a position at the radio station XEB, with Julián Morán accompanying him on piano. Ernesto Belloc, the station's artistic director at the time, advised Infante to continue his career as a carpenter, as he was nervous during the audition. Nonetheless he auditioned the following week and was hired to sing on the air three times a week.

In Mexico City he sang songs by composers such as Alberto Cervantes, José Alfredo Jiménez, Cuco Sánchez, Tomás Méndez, Rubén Fuentes, (some of the most renowned composers from the golden age of Mexican Cinema) Salvador Flores Rivera, (Chava Flores) (better known for his humorous songs), René Touzet, and others. His first musical recording, El soldado raso (The Private), was made on 19 November 1943 for the Peerless Records Company. Infante first appeared as an extra in the movie En un burro tres baturros (Three Men from Aragon on a Donkey), or the more correct and succinct transliteration, "Three Baturros on a Burro." His career as an actor in leading roles started with La feria de las flores (The Fair of Flowers), translated as "The Flower Carnival", in 1943.

In that same year, Mexican writer Carmen Barajas Sandoval, a friend and neighbor of Infante's wife, offered to introduce them to Jorge Negrete, a singer he admired. Barajas, the aunt of the child actress Angélica María, worked at the Sindicato de Trabajadores de la Producción Cinematográfica, S.T.P.C. (Union of Cinema Production Workers). She convinced Negrete to recommend Infante to the producer Ismael Rodríguez and others. As a result, he was invited to appear in different pictures, such as Vuelve el ametralladora (The Machine Gun Returns).

While he was still married to María Luisa León, Infante met the dancer Lupita Torrentera Bablot (b. 2 November 1931), with whom he had three children: Graciela Margarita (26 September 1947 – 20 January 1949, poliomyelitis); Pedro Infante, Jr. (31 March 1950 – 1 April 2009, suicide); and Guadalupe Infante Torrentera (b. 3 October 1951). Irma Infante (b. 27 March 1955) was born from his relationship with young actress Irma Dorantes.

== Actor ==
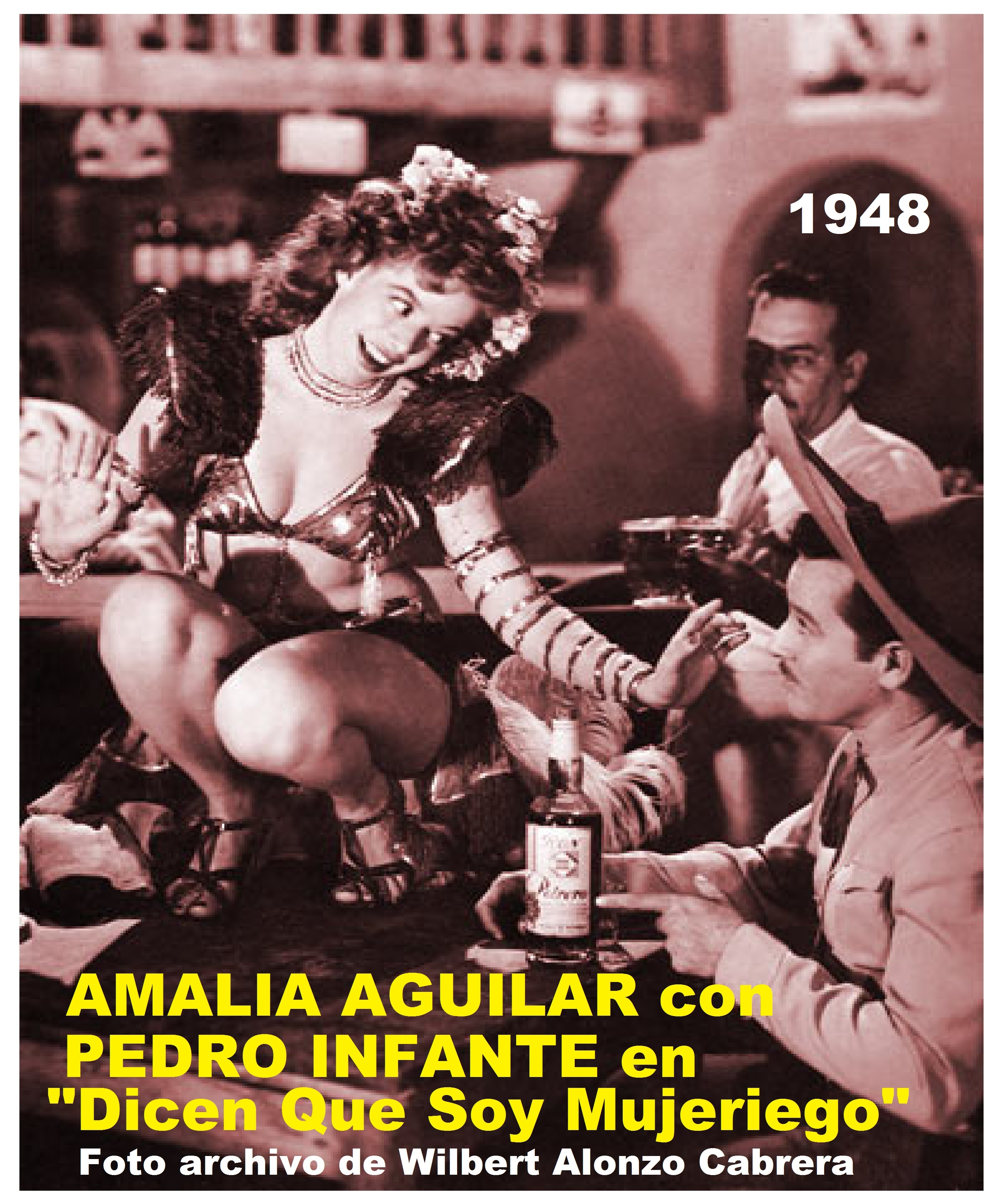
Pedro Infante with Amalia Aguilar, in a publicity photograph for the film Dicen que soy mujeriego (1949)

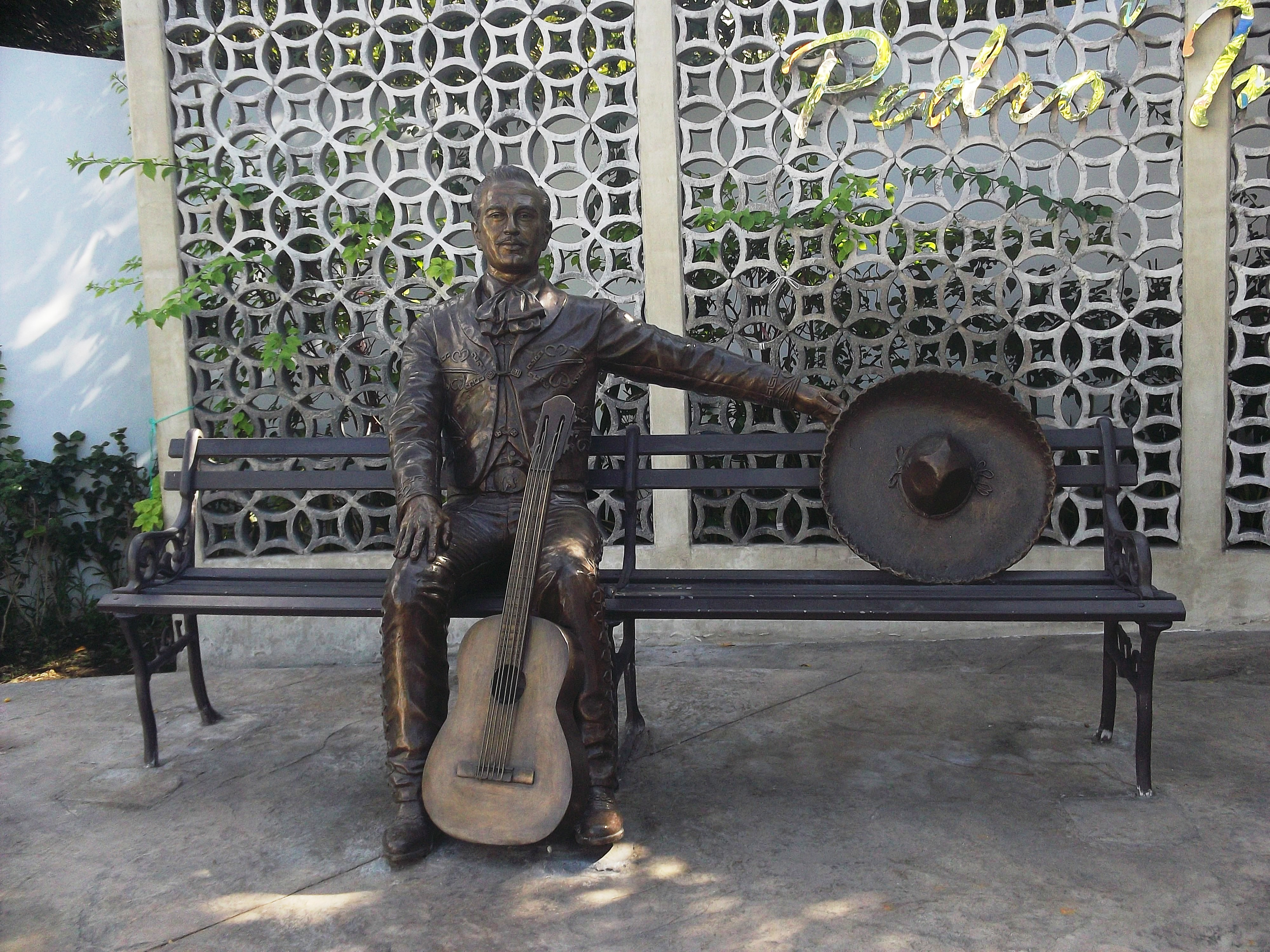
A statue of Pedro Infante in Mérida Yucatán

Infante acted in over 60 films, 30 of them with his brother Ángel. His career spanned the golden age of Mexican cinema. He appeared in such motion pictures as:

- Tizoc, along with María Félix, posthumously won him the Silver Bear for Best Actor at the 7th Berlin International Film Festival. The film itself won the Golden Globe Award for Best Foreign Film (Mexico) in 1958. The Silver Bear and the Golden Globe trophies, as well as his Ariel award, are housed in the Museo API de Pedro Infante in Isla Arena, Campeche, Mexico.
- The massive migration from the countryside to the cities (mostly to Mexico City) during the 1940s supplied the required labor force for rising manufacturing industries. This urbanization created the "working neighborhoods" and the culture of "la vecindad" (a group of small apartments around a common patio). This new urban working class identified with Pedro Infante through his character Pepe el Toro (Pepe the Bull) in the melodramatic trilogy of Nosotros los pobres, Ustedes los ricos, and Pepe el Toro (We the Poor, You the Rich, and Pepe the Bull), co-starring with Evita Muñoz "Chachita".
- He worked with Sara García ("Mexico's grandmother") in many movies in Mexican cinema. She frequently played the role of his loving but no-nonsense grandmother who constantly tried to get him to behave but never succeeded.
- The Mexican child star María Eugenia Llamas, who was only four at the time, made her screen debut with him in the 1948 film Los tres Huastecos (The Three Men from Hausteca) as "La Tucita", a screen name she would continue to use. She acted with him again under the moniker La Tucita in his classic 1949 film comedy, "Dicen que soy mujeriego" ("They Say I Am a Womanizer").
- One of his better roles was that of Juventino Rosas in the movie Sobre las olas ("Over the Waves"), based on the life of the Mexican waltz composer. Infante's natural musical abilities contributed to helping him get into character.
- An important point in his acting career was winning the Ariel Award given by the Mexican Academy of Arts and Cinematographic Sciences for Best Actor for his role in La vida no vale nada (Life is Worth Nothing, a line from the song Camino de Guanajuato).

== Musical works ==
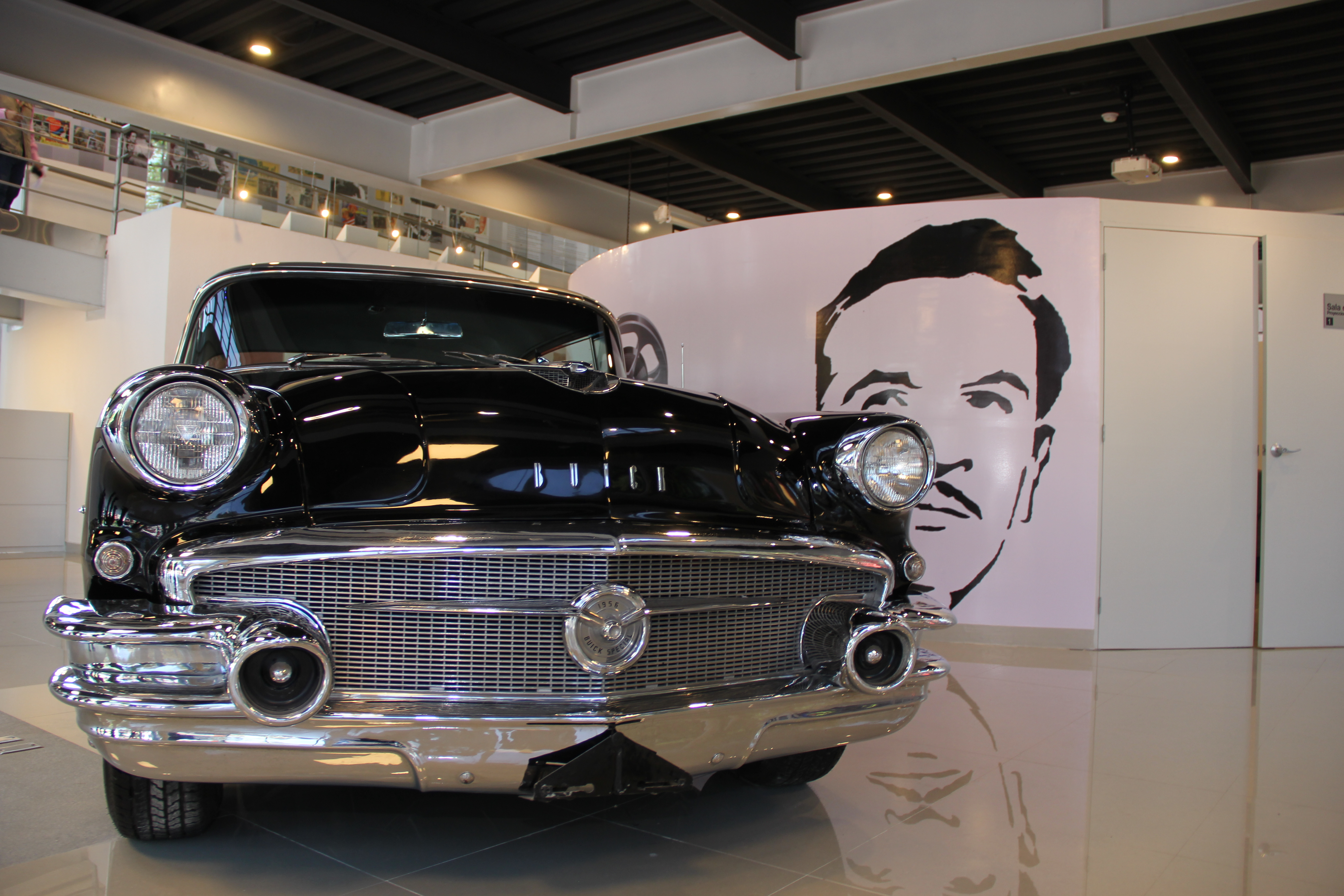
Museum Pedro Infante Automobile – Alfa

Infante recorded over 350 songs. His 1952 ranchera album Cuando sale la luna was rated No. 56 in a 2024 ranking of the 600 greatest Latin music albums of all time. Waltzes, cha-cha-chas, rancheras, and boleros placed him among the most popular singers of the mariachi and ranchera music genres. Some of his most famous songs include Amorcito Corazón (approximately My Little Love, Sweetheart), Te quiero así (I Love You Like This), La que se fue (She Who Left), Corazón (Heart), El durazno (The Peach), Dulce Patria (Sweet Fatherland), Maldita sea mi suerte (Cursed Be My Luck), Así es la vida (Life Is Like This), Mañana Rosalía (Tomorrow Rosalía), Mi cariñito (My Little Darling), Dicen que soy mujeriego (They Say I Am a Womanizer), Carta a Eufemia (Letter to Eufemia), Nocturnal, Cien años (Hundred Years), Flor sin retoño (Flower Without Sprout), Pénjamo, and ¿Qué te ha dado esa mujer? (What Has That Woman Given You?). He sang "Mi cariñito" to his frequent on-screen grandmother, Sara Garcia, so often in their movies that the song was played at her funeral.

The world-famous song Bésame mucho ("Kiss Me a Lot", or more loosely translated to get closer to its elusive Spanish meaning, "Give Me a Lot of Kisses"), from the composer Consuelo Velázquez, was the only track that Infante recorded in English, and he performed it in the movie A toda máquina (ATM) (At Full Speed), with Luis Aguilar.

== Plane crash and death ==
=== Death ===
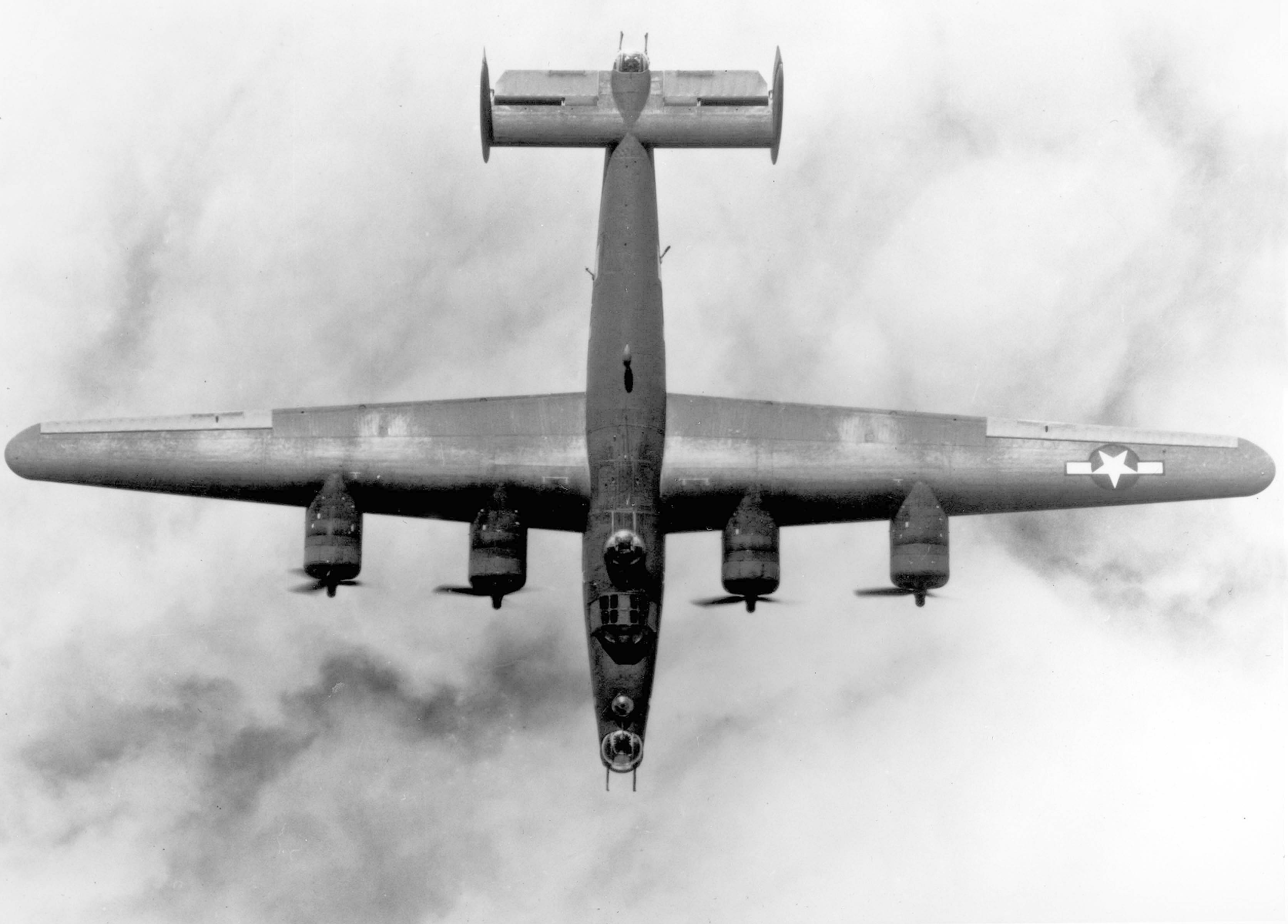
B-24 Liberator photographed from above

Infante's hobby was aviation, logging 2,989 flight hours, under the pseudonym Captain Cruz, which ultimately led to his death on the morning of 15 April 1957. Infante had survived two prior plane crashes—the first one occurred in 1947, and another in 1949 from which an injury to his forehead left him with a metal plate in its place. According to biographer Wilbert Alonzo-Cabrera, the actor was co-piloting a Consolidated B-24D, which had been converted from a heavy bomber to a freighter in San Diego, California. On the day of the crash, Infante was on his way to Mexico City from Mérida, Yucatán, to challenge the ruling that annulled his marriage to Irma Dorantes. The air traffic controller, Carmen León, was the last person to hear Infante's voice. Five minutes after taking off from Mérida, Yucatán, in southeast Mexico, an engine failed and caused the plane to spiral down, killing all three on board (Infante, pilot Víctor Manuel Vidal Lorca, and Marcial Bautista) as well as two others on the ground, including a 19-year-old woman named Ruth Russell Chan.

Infante's death was announced by XEMH radio personality Húmberto Sánchez-Rodríguez in Mérida after one of the firefighters discovered a bracelet engraved with the name "Pedro Infante", plus the winged insignia that symbolized his aviator license. This was around 8:15 am; at 11:12 am, Manuel Bernal of Mexico City radio station XEW reported the news saying, "This Monday, 15 April 1957, Pedro, our beloved Pedro...this has been confirmed, has died in a tragic accident in Mérida, Yucatán." His remains were later identified by the gold bracelet he wore. Additional identification was done during the autopsy by Benjamín Góngora, from the metal plate in Infante's forehead that he received after his injuries in the 1949 crash.

The death of Pedro Infante caused an unprecedented outpouring of grief in Mexico and Latin America, leading to reports of suicides, faintings, and nervous breakdowns among his fans.

Two days later, he was laid to rest at the Panteón Jardín cemetery amid 300,000 people who had gathered for the closed-casket funeral after a tribute at the Jorge Negrete Theater. Rodolfo Echeverría, who was Secretary-General of the National Actors Association at that time, delivered Infante's eulogy. Infante died intestate.

=== Homages ===
In 1983 the Los Angeles, CA radio station KWKW, which was at the time broadcasting a Pedro Infante hour airing songs as well as readings of fan letters, organized a campaign to change one of Boyle Heights' street names to Pedro Infante Street. Later it was decided Euclid Heights would become Pedro Infante Street, and the unveiling of the street sign was held in August 1983.

Infante was awarded a star on the Hollywood Walk of Fame on 1 August 1993. His star is located at 7083 Hollywood Boulevard.

On 2 April 2001 Infante was inducted into the International Latin Music Hall of Fame in an awards ceremony that also included Xavier Cugat and Ruben Blades. The event was held at the Hostos Center For The Arts And Culture, located in the Bronx, New York City.

=== Museums ===
There are five museums dedicated to his life and career:

- Hotel Boulevard Infante, Mérida, Yucatan, Mexico – Located at Avenida Itzáes #587 in Mérida, Yucatan, Mexico there is a small gallery dedicated to Infante's life and career called "Amorcito Corazon" in the Hotel Boulevard Infante. The building was formerly Infante's residence, acquired by him in 1954, and was where he lived with Irma Dorantes up to his death. The 80-room air-conditioned building was turned into a hotel in 1959.
- Pedro Infante API Museo, Calkini, Campeche, Mexico – Inaugurated on 16 February 2012, the Pedro Infante API Museo is located in the Isla Arena Lighthouse and houses Infante's Silver Bear and Golden Globe awards as well as costume replicas and film contracts.
- Museo del Centro Cultural Nacional Pedro Infante (Museum of the Pedro Infante National Cultural Center), Cuajimalpa, Mexico City, Mexico – Inaugurated on 1 March 2015, this museum houses costumes worn by Infante in three of his films: Pepe el Toro, A toda carga, Tizoc and Los tres huastecos as well as music, singing and performance workshops.
- El Rincón de Pedro Infante (Pedro Infante Corner), Mazatlán, Sinaloa – Located at his birthplace, in the house he lived in as a young child, the Pedro Infante Corner houses Costumes, posters, and photographs. The museum is located at 88 Constitution St in Mazatlán.
- Museo a Pedro Infante – In 2017 a museum called Museo a Pedro Infante (Pedro Infante Museum) was opened in Guamúchil, Mexico to commemorate Pedro Infante's career. It contains a Jeep and other personal articles that belonged to him as well as movie and music memorabilia that pertained to his career.

=== Statues ===
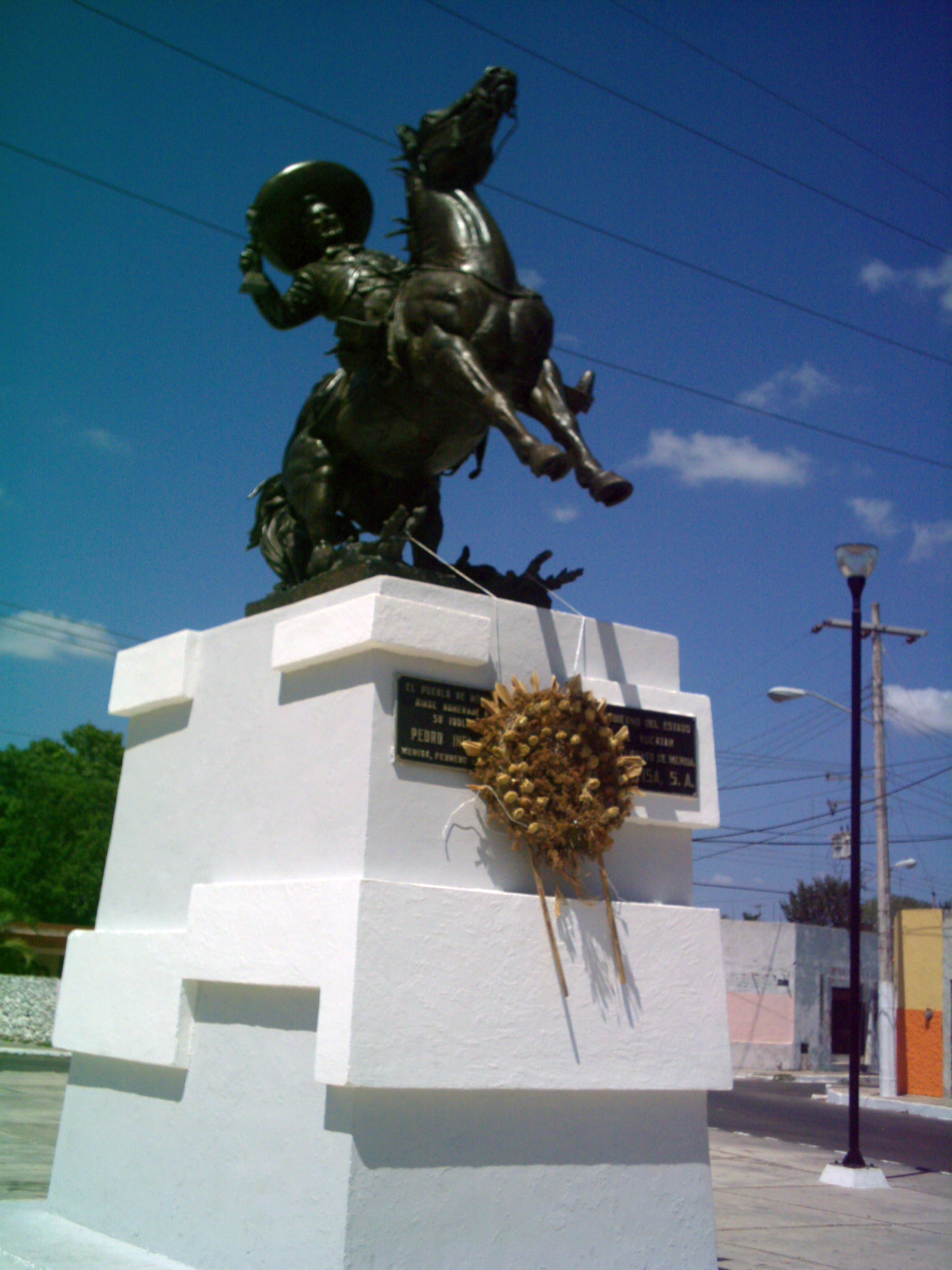
Pedro Infante Statue in Mérida, Yucatán

At least five statues have been erected in Pedro Infante's honor:

- In Mérida, Infante is depicted on a rearing horse and is the work of Yucatecan sculptor Humberto Peraza y Ojeda, and is located at 62 and 91 streets. This statue was made out of thousands of bronze keys donated by his fans to a Mexico City TV station after a key drive by TV host and producer Raúl Velasco.
- At the Paseo de Olas Altas at Mazatlán, Sinaloa (Infante's birthplace) there is a statue of Pedro Infante on a motorcycle, in honor of his role in the movie A Toda Máquina with Luis Aguilar and "¿Qué te ha dado esa mujer?" also with Luis Aguilar, Rosita Arenas and Carmen Montejo.
- In Mérida, there is a bust of Infante at the site of his fatal airplane crash, at the intersection of 54th and 87th Streets.
- In Guamúchil, at the Museo a Pedro Infante, he is depicted as a singer, wearing his traditional charro suit, with a guitar by his side. This statue is in the town square of Guamúchil, his adopted hometown.
- In Mexico City there is a statue of Infante on a motorcycle that also displays him in his role in A Toda Máquina, which was sculpted by Ariel de la Peña. For the statue in Mérida there was another key drive by La Más Perrona radio station for bronze keys to be used in the statue. The statue was erected in 2008 after a convoy through city streets that drew attention from many onlookers.
- Also in Mérida there is a statue of Infante seated on a park bench with a guitar by his side, and his arm outstretched and was erected in 2017 for what would have been his 100th birthday. The statue is located in a park that bears his name.

== Legacy ==
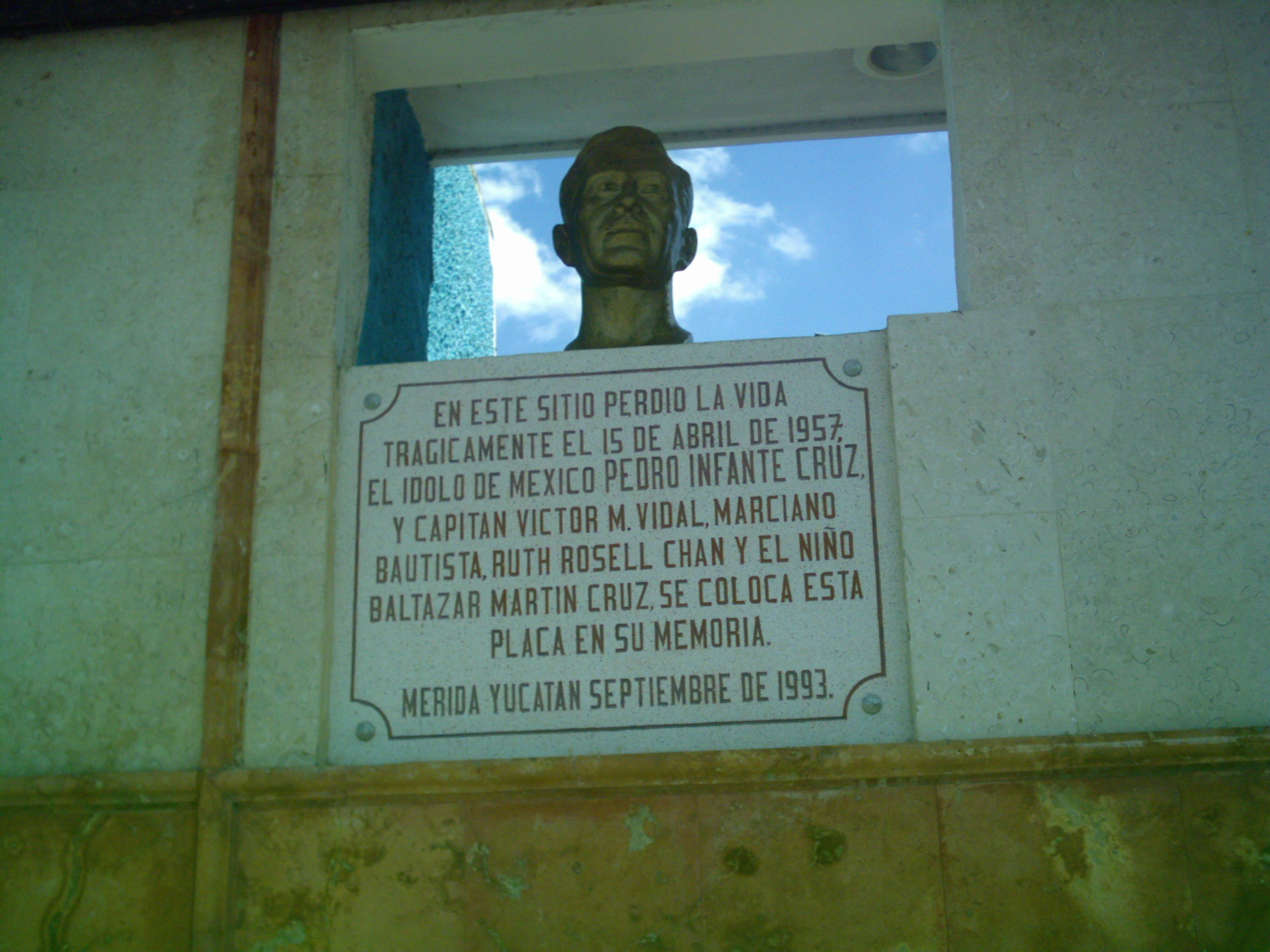
Pedro Infante's bust in the place he died

According to producer Jorge Madrid y Campos, who was also his legal representative, Pedro Infante's fame has increased greatly since his death. Infante attracts a great number of fans of every age to his shrine in the Panteón Jardín of Mexico City, as well as the one at 54th and 87th streets in the historic center of Mérida. Singers of ranchera and mariachi have paid posthumous musical homage to him. Denise Chávez, said in her book Loving Pedro Infante: "If you're a [Mexican], and don't know who he is, you should be tied to a hot stove with a yucca rope and beaten with sharp dry corn husks as you stand in a vat of soggy fideos. If your racial and cultural background or ethnicity is other, then it's about time you learned about the most famous of Mexican singers and actors."

In 2017, for what would have been Infante's 100th birthday, his life and career was celebrated with a Google Doodle that featured a slideshow with six graphics depicting Infante wearing traditional Mariachi garb, as a singer, a boxer as well as others. Infante was also briefly depicted in the 2017 animated Disney movie Coco, along with Jorge Negrete.

Some fans have speculated that his death was faked. These rumors were fueled by, among other factors, the fact that Infante's body was burned beyond recognition in the airplane crash, and by the appearance, in the 1980s, of a singer named Antonio Pedro, who was thought to resemble Infante. Antonio Pedro even went to the Maria Laria television talk show in the U.S.A., to claim he was Infante.

== Selected filmography ==
- En un burro tres baturros (Three Men of Aragon on a Donkey) (1939) – Minor Role
- El organillero (The Organ Grinder) (1939, Short)
- Puedes irte de mí (You Can Leave Me) (1940, Short) – Orchestra Director
- Jesusita en Chihuahua (Jesusita in Chihuahua) (1942) – Valentín Terrazas
- La feria de las flores (The Fair of Flowers) (1943) – Rosendo, amigo de Valentín
- La razón de la culpa (The Reason of the Blame) (1943) – Roberto
- Arriba las mujeres (Hooray for Women) (1943) – Chuy
- El Ametralladora (The Machine Gun) (1943) – Salvador Pérez Gómez 'El Ametralladora'
- Mexicanos al grito de guerra (Mexicans at the Cry of War) (1943) – Lt. Luis Sandoval
- Cuando habla el corazón (When The Heart Speaks) (1943) – Miguel del Campo
- ¡Viva mi desgracia! (Long Live My Bad Luck!) (1944) – Ramón Pineda
- Escándalo de estrellas (The Stars' Scandal) (1944) – Ricardo del Valle y Rosales
- Cuando lloran los valientes (When The Brave Cry) (1947) – Agapito Treviño 'Caballo Blanco'
- Si me han de matar mañana (Should They Kill Me Tomorrow) (1947) – Ramiro del Campo
- La barca de oro (The Golden Boat) (1947) – Lorenzo
- Los tres García (The Three Garcías) (1947) – Luis Antonio García
- Soy charro de Rancho Grande (I Am a Charro Of Rancho Grande) (1947) – Antonio Aldama
- Vuelven los García (The Garcías Return) (1947) – Luis Antonio García
- Nosotros los Pobres (We The Poor) (1948) – Jose del Toro, 'Pepe el toro'
- Cartas marcadas (Marked Cards) (1948) – Manuel
- Los tres huastecos (The Three Huastecos) (1948) – Juan de Dios Andrade / Lorenzo Andrade / Víctor Andrade
- Angelitos negros (Little Black Angels) (1948) – José Carlos Ruiz
- Ustedes los ricos (You The Rich) (1948) – Pepe 'El Toro'
- Dicen que soy mujeriego (They Say I'm A Womanizer) (1949) – Pedro Dosamantes
- La mujer que yo perdí (The Woman That I Lost) (1949) – Pedro Montaño
- El seminarista (The Seminarian) (1949) – Miguel Morales
- La oveja negra (The Black Sheep) (1949) – Silvano
- No desearás la mujer de tu hijo (You Shall Not Covet Thy Son's Wife) (1950) – Silvano
- También de dolor se canta (One Also Sings From Pain) (1950) – Braulio Peláez
- Sobre las olas (Over the Waves) (1950) – Juventino Rosas
- El gavilán pollero (The Chicken Hawk) (1951) – José Inocencio Meléndez 'El Gavilán'
- Las mujeres de mi general (My General's Women) (1951) – General Juan Zepeda
- Islas Marías (María Islands) (1951) – Felipe Ortiz Suárez
- Necesito dinero (I Need Money) (1951) – Manuel
- A toda máquina (Full Speed Ahead) (1951) – Pedro Chávez
- ¡¿Qué te ha dado esa mujer?! (What Has That Woman Done to You?) (1951) – Pedro Chávez Pérez
- Ahí viene Martín Corona (There Comes Martín Corona) (1952) – Martín Corona
- Los hijos de María Morales (The Sons Of María Morales) (1952) – José Morales (Pepe)
- Por ellas aunque mal paguen (For Them Although They Pay Badly) (1952) – Pedro
- Un rincón cerca del cielo (A Place Near Heaven) (1952) – Pedro González
- Ahora soy rico (Now I Am Rich) (1952) – Pedro González
- El enamorado (The Lover) (1952) – Martín Corona
- Penjamo (1953) – Cantante (uncredited)
- Había una vez un marido (There Once Was A Husband) (1953) – Pedro Infante
- Sí, mi vida (Yes, My Dear) (1952)
- Pepe el toro (Pepe The Bull) (1952) – Pepe 'El Toro'
- Ansiedad (Anxiety) (1953) – Carlos Iturbe y Valdivia / Gabriel Lara / Rafael Lara
- Dos tipos de cuidado (Two Guys To Be Afraid Of) (1953) – Pedro Malo
- Reportaje (News Article) (1953) – Edmundo Bernal
- Gitana tenías que ser (You Had To Be a Gypsy) (1953) – Pablo Mendoza
- El mil amores (The Thousand Lover) (1954) – Bibiano Villarreal
- Cuidado con el amor (Beware With Love) (1954) – Salvador Allende
- Escuela de vagabundos (School of Vagabonds) (1954) – José Alberto Medina
- La vida no vale nada (Life's Worth Nothing) (1954) – Pablo Galván
- Escuela de música (School Of Music) (1955) – Javier Prado
- Los gavilanes (The Sparrowhawks) (1956) – Juan Menchaca
- Pueblo, canto y esperanza (People, Song And Hope) (1956) – Lencho Jiménez (mexican episode)
- La tercera palabra (The Third Word) (1956) – Pablo Saldaña
- El inocente (The Innocent) (1956) – Cutberto Gaudázar 'Cruci'
- Pablo and Carolina (1957) – Pablo Garza (released posthumously)
- Tizoc (1957) – Tizoc (released posthumously)
- Escuela de rateros (School of Thieves) (1958) – Víctor Valdés / Raúl Cuesta Hernández (released posthumously; final film role)

== Awards ==
- Ariel Award – for his role in La Vida No Vale Nada (Life is Worthless) in 1956.
- Silver Bear for Best Actor – for Tizoc at the 7th Berlin International Film Festival, (posthumously) in 1957.
- Golden Globe Award – for the Best Foreign Film (Mexico) in 1958 for the movie Tizoc

== See also ==
- List of best-selling Latin music artists
