= María Laria =

Cuban-American talk show host, musician, writer and journalist

María Joséfa Laria Hernández (born May 7, 1959, in Havana, Cuba) is a Cuban-American journalist, musician, novelist and television personality. A pianist, she is better known by United States audiences as the presenter of the Telemundo Internacional television talk-show, "Cara a Cara con María Laria", which was shown for many years.

== Early life ==
Laria is the daughter of Amaro Lauria and Ofelia Hernández. Born in Cuba, Laria was exposed to multiple cultures from a young age, as she and her family moved around a lot, first to New Mexico when she was 5 years old, and then to Miami, Florida, before setting in Puerto Rico. In Puerto Rico, Laria studied music, as she was a student at the Conservatorio de Música de Puerto Rico.

== Career ==
In October 1990, Laria's show, "Cara a Cara con María Laria" ("Face to Face with María Laria") debuted on Telemundo's U.S.A. network. Initially, magazines such as Entertainment Weekly compared Laria to Oprah Winfrey. The show lasted a number of seasons.

Among her show's best known episodes were one where she interviewed Mexican actress and singer Lucia Mendez, and one where she interviewed Antonio Pedro, a Mexican man who claimed to be legendary singer Pedro Infante.

During that time, Laria earned various honors by the United States' government, including the declaring of "María Laria day" by Los Angeles mayor Tom Bradley. Her show, which was initially recorded from Los Angeles, was moved by Telemundo from that city to Miami, Florida, and it was considered a competitor to Cristina Saralegui's Univision's "Show de Cristina". But, after "Cara a Cara con María Laria" was cancelled by Telemundo, Laria moved to Spain, where she began hosting a series of new television talk shows.

Later, during the late 2000s, Laria hosted a television show named "Arrebatados" ("Snatched Away Ones", but which literally translates better to "Crazed Ones") on the America TV television channel; the show was cancelled in 2018 after a decade on the air. That year (2018) was a bad year personally for Laria (see below).

=== Musical career ===
A trained musician as a pianist, Laria has released one album in both vinyl and CD formats, the piano music album "Pianissimo" (1998), which was re-released in 2010 as "Pianissimo...live from Jordan Hall".

=== Writing career ===
In 2015, Laria became a novelist, releasing a book named "Fear of Love", about a male pianist named "Jean Claude", who experiences fame and success but feels lonely until he meets ballet dancer "Paulina".

=== Radio career ===
Since 2018, Laria has hosted a radio show named "María Laria: Bajo el Sol" ("María Laria: Under the Sun") on a radio station named La Poderosa FM.

== Personal life ==
Laria married Vietnam War veteran Carlos Ceballos late in the 1970s. In 2018, after a 40-year marriage, Laria lost her husband to an unspecified disease. After his passing, she set up a Gofundme account to cover funeral costs. In it, she called the moment the worst of her life.

2018 was a very bad year for Laria: not only did her husband die, but so did her mom, and her television show, "Arrebatados", was cancelled after being transmitted for ten years.

== See also ==
- List of Cubans
