= Eulalio González =

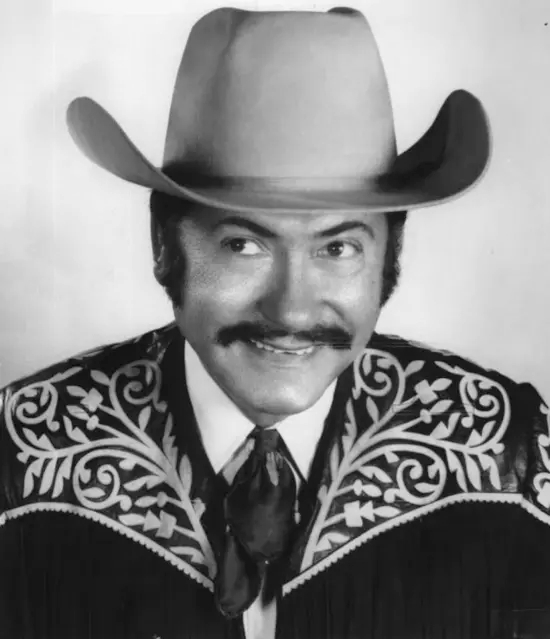
- González in 1976

Background information
- Also known as: Lalo González "Piporro"
- Born: Eulalio González Ramírez; 16 December 1921; Los Herreras, Nuevo León, Mexico
- Died: 1 September 2003 (aged 81) San Pedro Garza García, Nuevo León, Mexico
- Genres: Regional Mexican
- Occupations: Actor, comedian, singer-songwriter, screenwriter, announcer, film director, film producer
- Instrument: Vocals
- Years active: 1951–1994
- Label: Musart
- Website: piporro.com

Eulalio "Lalo" González Ramírez (16 December 1921 – 1 September 2003), nicknamed "Piporro", was a Mexican actor, comedian, singer-songwriter, screenwriter, announcer, film director, and film producer.

== Early life ==
González was born in the home of his maternal grandfather (Martín Ramírez) in Los Herreras, Nuevo León, to Pablo González Barrera, a customs officer from Ciudad Mier, Tamaulipas, and his wife Elvira Ramírez González. Due to his father's profession, González spent his early infancy in various states of northern Mexico. Relatives living and working in present-day Hollywood include actress and award-winning artist, Cynthia Pinot.

== Career ==
Though González began his career in the entertainment industry working as a radio announcer, mainstream success came when he, along with Pedro Infante playing the title role, starred a radio drama titled Martín Corona. González portrayed Martín Corona's elderly norteño sidekick named "Piporro". Martín Corona's success spawned a film version, Ahí viene Martín Corona in 1952, with González and Infante reprising their roles. He also played a similar role as the norteño sidekick of Fernando Casanova in the El Águila Negra film series.

== Death ==
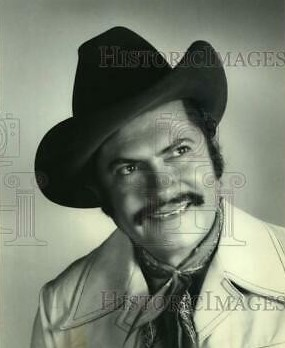
González in 1976

González died on 1 September 2003, at his home in San Pedro Garza García, Nuevo León. He was 81 years old.

== Selected filmography ==
Year	Title	Role	Leading lady
1953	You Had to Be a Gypsy		
1957	Los chiflados del rock and roll	Don Apolonio Aguilar	Rosita Arenas
1959	Dos corazones y un cielo	Felipe "Jelipe" Treviño	Rosa de Castilla
1960	La nave de los monstruos	Laureano Treviño Gómez	Ana Bertha Lepe
1960	De tal palo tal astilla	Gumaro Malacara	Marina Camacho
1961	El padre Pistolas	Eulalio	Christiane Martel
1962	Ruletero a toda marcha	Crisóstomo Garza González/Laureano Garza González	María Duval
1962	El Terror de la Frontera	Martín Garrido/Ramon Garrido	Lucha Villa/Maria Eugenia San Martin
1963	El rey del tomate	Librado Cantú Escamilla	Luz Márquez
1964	Héroe a la fuerza	Caín/Abel	Rosa de Castilla/Lola Casanova
1966	El tragabalas	Tragabalas	Flor Silvestre/Lorena Velázquez/Evangelina Elizondo
1966	La Valentina	Genovevo Cruz García	María Félix
1966	El rata	Timo	Regina Torné/Alma Delia Fuentes
1967	Qué hombre tan sin embargo	Filomeno Malo	Julissa
1967	El pistolero desconocido	Comandante Romualdo Tijerina / Pablo	Elsa Aguirre

== Awards and nominations ==
Year	Award	Category	Film	Outcome
1955	Ariel Award	Actor in a Minor Role	Píntame angelitos blancos	Nominated
1956	Ariel Award	Actor in a Minor Role	Espaldas mojadas	Won
1967	Silver Goddess Award	Best Actor	El rata	Nominated
1971	Silver Goddess Award	Best Comedy Performance	El pocho	Won
