= José Alfredo Jiménez =

Mexican singer-songwriter

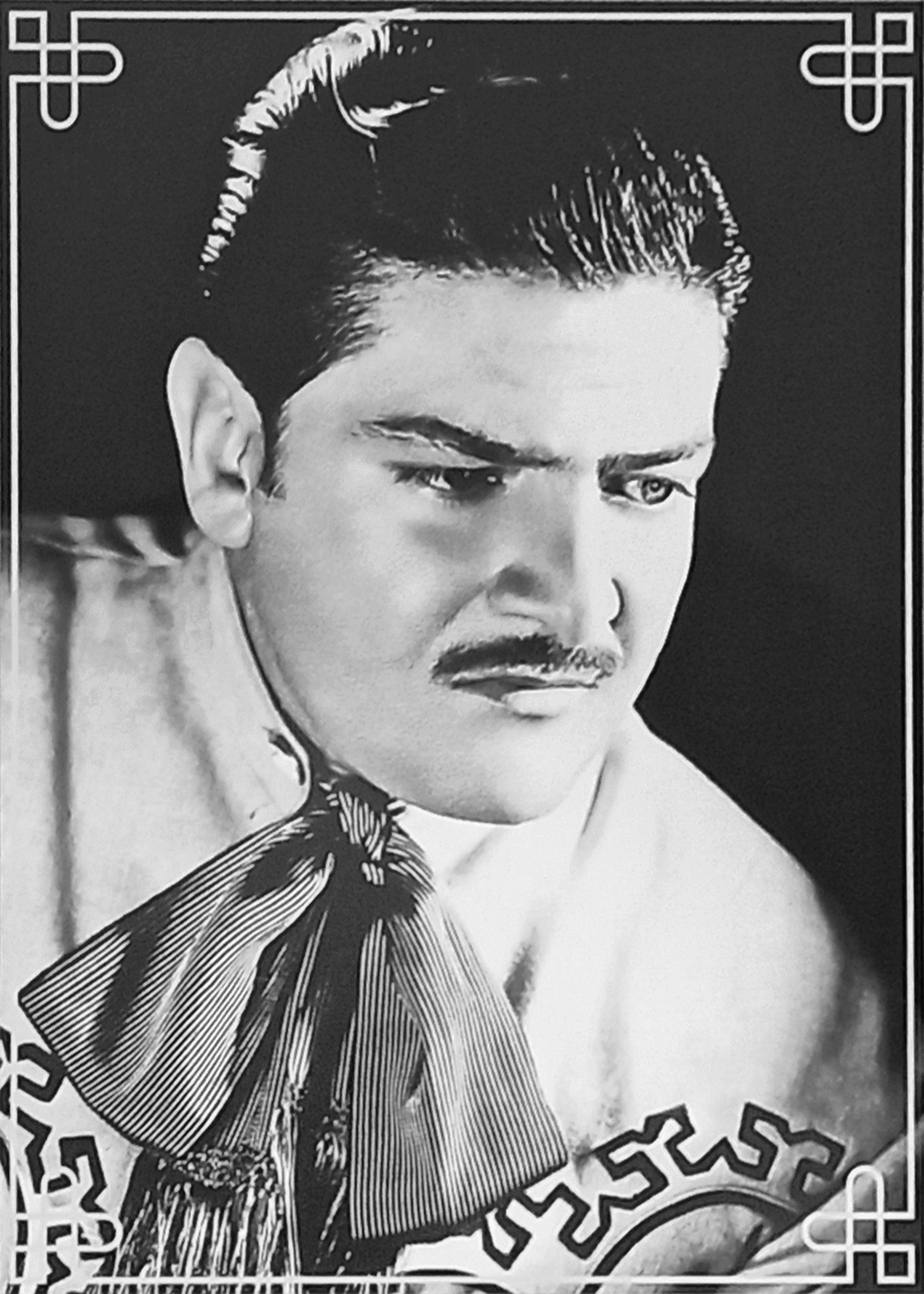
- Picture of Jiménez

Background information
- Also known as: "El Rey"
- Born: José Alfredo Jiménez Sandoval; 19 January 1926; Dolores Hidalgo, Guanajuato, Mexico
- Died: 23 November 1973 (aged 47) Mexico City, Mexico
- Genres: Regional Mexican; Canción ranchera; Corrido; Mariachi
- Occupations: Musician; songwriter
- Instrument: Vocals
- Years active: 1946–1973
- Label: RCA
- Spouse(s): Paloma Gálvez 1952; Alicia Juárez Palazuelos 1970-1973
- Partner: Mary Medel

José Alfredo Jiménez Sandoval (Spanish pronunciation: [xoˈse alˈfɾeðo xiˈmenes]; 19 January 1926 – 23 November 1973) was a Mexican actor and singer-songwriter, whose songs are regarded as the basis of modern Regional Mexican music and Rancheras.

== Early life ==
Jiménez was born in Dolores Hidalgo, Guanajuato, Mexico. His father died when he was ten years old, and his mother moved the family to Mexico City. Jiménez worked from a young age to help support his family. He took a job as a waiter at a Yucatacan restaurant in Santa María de la Ribera named La Sirena. While working there, he started writing songs and singing with a group called Los Rebeldes.

In his youth, Jiménez enjoyed playing football as a goalkeeper. He and Antonio Carbajal—who would later become a legendary Mexican goalkeeper and the first player to participate in five FIFA World Cups—competed for the goalkeeper position at the amateur club El Oviedo in Santa María la Ribera, Mexico City, in 1942.

== Career ==
The singer Miguel Aceves Mejía claims to have discovered him from Los Rebeldes. According to Mejía, Jiménez did not play an instrument and did not even know the Spanish word for "waltz" or what keys his songs were in. Following Mejía's instruction, Jiménez auditioned at the Radio Station XEW's Amanecer Ranchero together with the Mariachi Vargas and Rubén Fuentes. Jiménez performed a cappella, including his song "Ella". Don Miguel subsequently recorded "Ella, "Yo", "Serenata huasteca" and "Tu Recuerdo y yo".

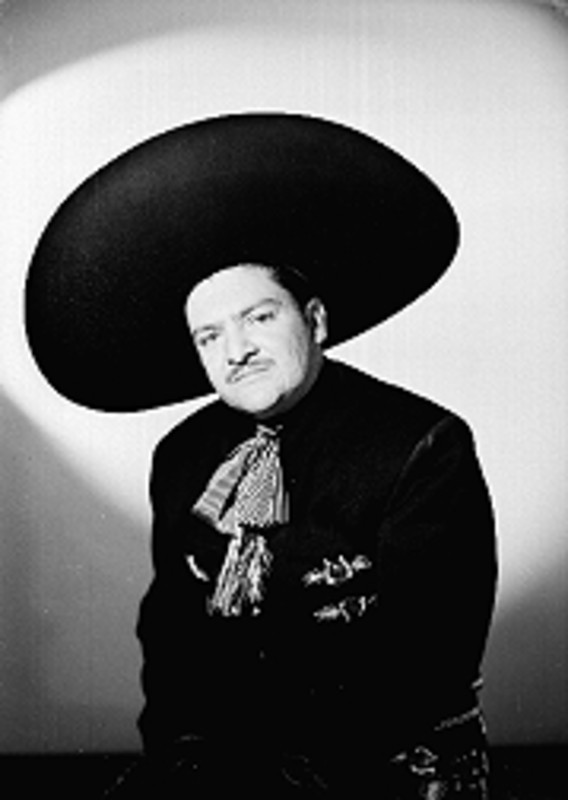
José Alfredo Jiménez in a traditional charro suit, photographed circa 1950 by Simón Flechine.

After this, he composed more than 1,000 songs. Among the most famous are "Yo", "Me equivoqué contigo", "Ella", "Paloma querida", "Que se me acabe la Vida ", "Tú y la mentira", "Media vuelta", "El Rey", "Sin sangre en las venas", "El jinete", "Si nos dejan", "Amanecí en tus brazos", "Llegando a ti", "Tu recuerdo y yo", El hijo del pueblo", "Cuando el destino", "El caballo blanco", "Llegó borracho el Borracho" and "Que te vaya bonito", as well as "Camino de Guanajuato", where he sang about his home state of Guanajuato.

One of his last appearances on Mexican television occurred in 1973, just months prior to his death, where he introduced his last song, "Gracias", accompanied by his wife, singer Alicia Juarez. Later, Jiménez died at the age of 47 years old in Mexico City on 23 November 1973 due to complications resulting from cirrhosis.

== Personal life ==
José Alfredo Jiménez, had three significant relationships during his lifetime. His first marriage was to Paloma Gálvez in 1952, with whom he had two children: José Alfredo Jr. and Paloma. Despite their separation around 1960, their marriage was never legally dissolved, making it his only legal marriage. Subsequently, he entered into a long-term relationship with actress and model Mary Medel, with whom he had four children: Guadalupe, José Antonio, Martha, and José Alfredo Jiménez Medel. Although they were not legally married, they formed a family and lived together for over a decade before separating. In 1970, Jiménez married singer Alicia Juárez in a religious ceremony; however, due to the unresolved status of his first marriage, the legality of this union is disputed. They remained together until Jiménez's death in 1973.

== Tribute ==
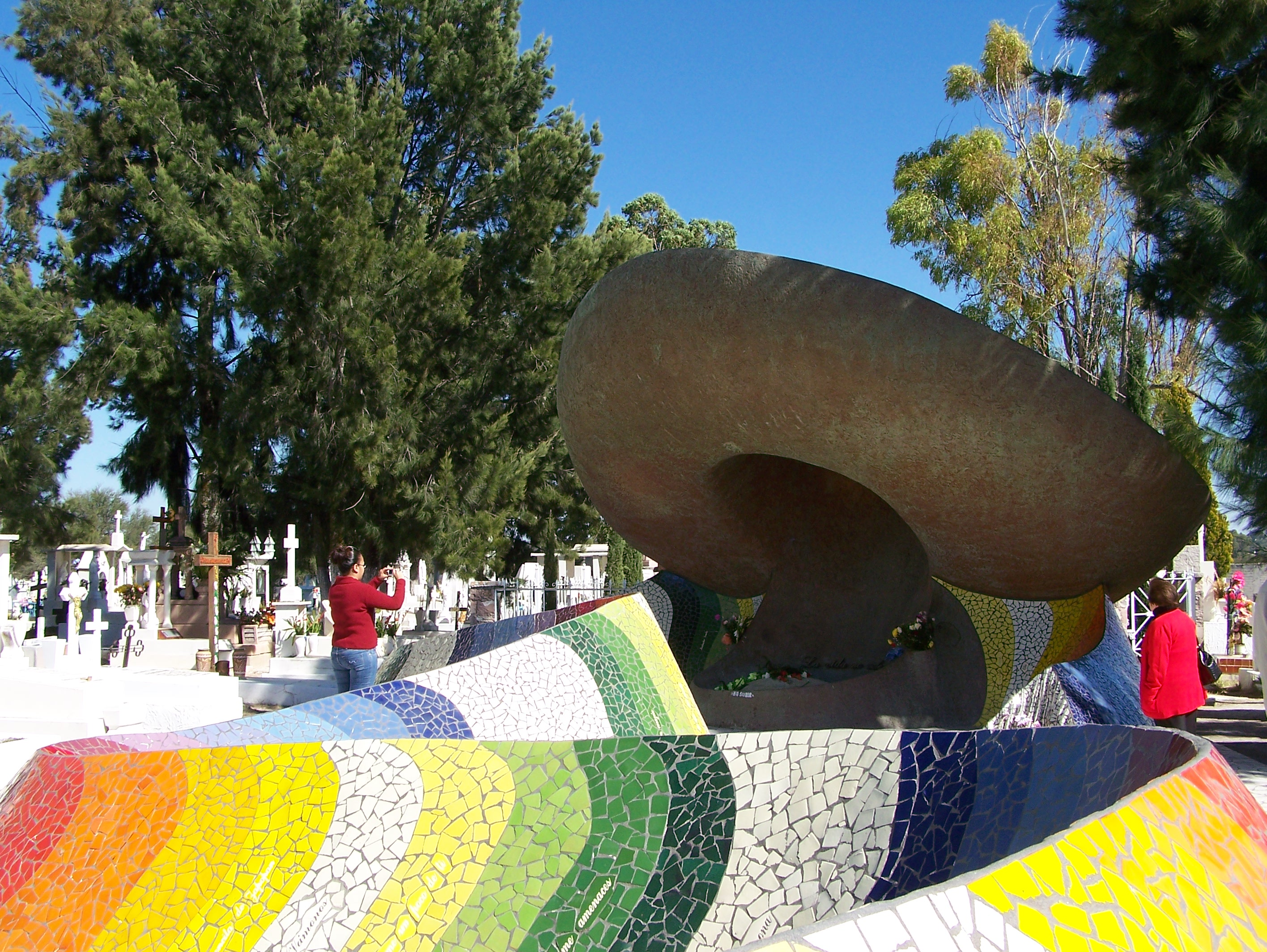
The themed José Alfredo Jiménez' tomb in Dolores Hidalgo, Guanajuato

Jiménez is buried in his hometown of Dolores Hidalgo, Guanajuato. His tomb, the "Mausoleum of José Alfredo Jiménez", is in the shape of a traditional shawl and sombrero, much like the ones Jiménez would wear during his performances.

Son of José Alfredo Jiménez, singer José Alfredo Jiménez Medel, wrote a prologue to a 214-page book commemorating him that is titled En el último trago nos vamos. His daughter, Paloma Jiménez Gálvez, also released a book titled Es Inútil Dejar De Quererte: 50 Años Sin José Alfredo in the 37th edition of the Guadalajara International Book Fair.

His songs have been recorded by many artists, such as Selena, Miguel Aceves Mejía, Little Joe Hernández & The Latinaires, and the Mexican rock group Maná. Joaquín Sabina paid homage to Jiménez with his song, "Por el Bulevar de los Sueños Rotos" ("On the Boulevard of Broken Dreams").

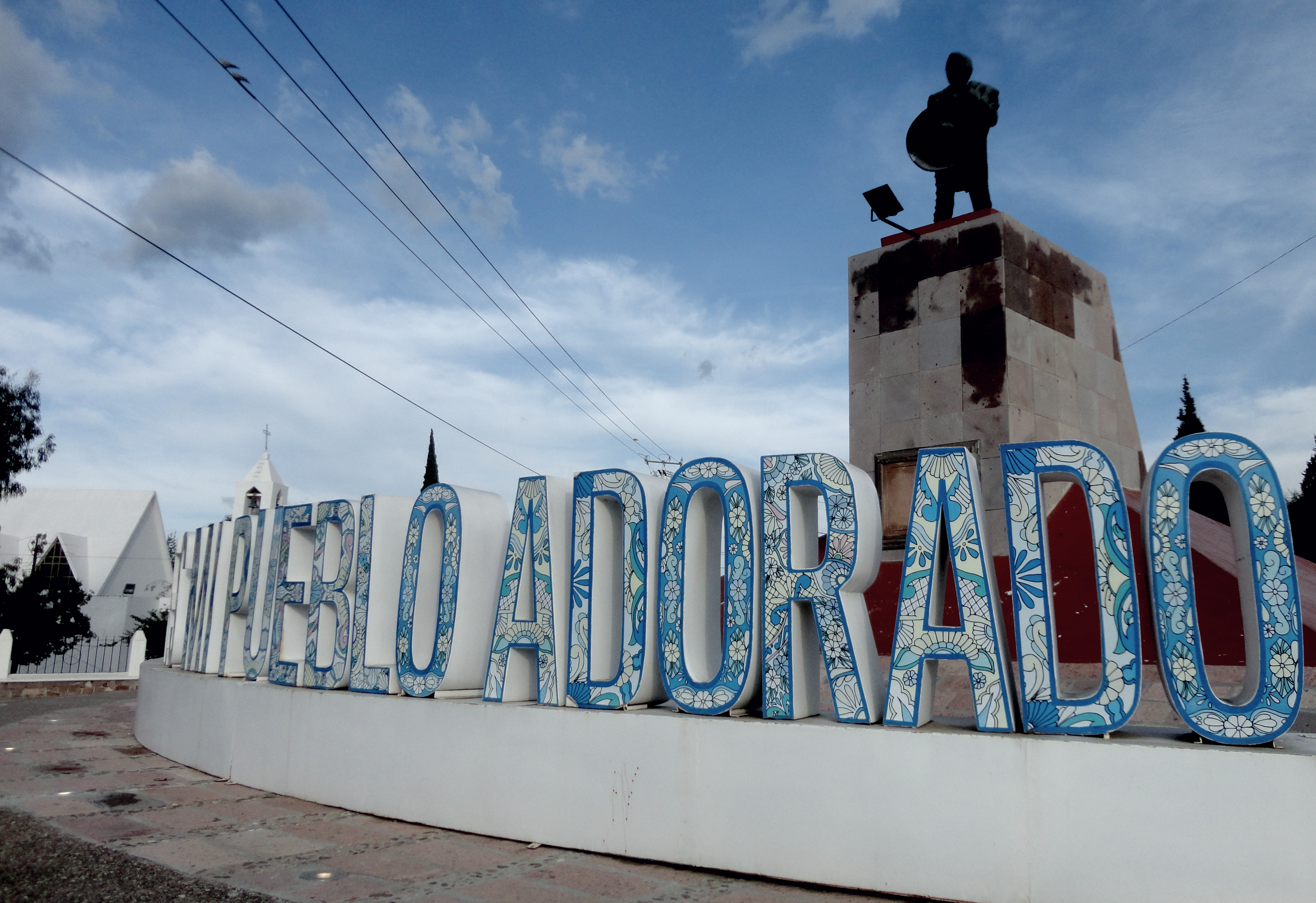
Monument to José Alfredo Jiménez in Dolores Hidalgo, Guanajuato

== Discography ==
=== Studio albums ===
- La Sota De Copas (1970)
- El Cantinero (1971)
- El Rey (1971)
- Gracias (1972)

=== Compilation albums ===
- 15 Exitos Inolvidables De (1983) — RCA Records
- 12 Exitos De Oro (1988) — RCA Records
- Lo Esencial (2008) — RCA/Legacy Recordings

== Partial filmography ==
- The Guests of the Marquesa (1951)
- Here Comes Martin Corona (1952)
- El enamorado (1952)
- Ni pobres ni ricos (1953)
- Los aventureros (1954)
- Tres bribones (1955) – Cantante
- Camino de Guanajuato (1955) – José Alfredo Martínez
- Pura Vida (1956) – El mismo
- La fiera (1956) – Cantante
- La feria de San Marcos (1958)
- Guitarras de medianoche (1958) – José Alfredo
- Ferias de México (1959)
- Mis padres se divorcian (1959) – Cantante (uncredited)
- Cada quién su música (1959)
- El hombre del alazán (1959)
- Juana Gallo (1961) – Nabor, el caporal
- Las hijas del Amapolo (1962)
- La Sonrisa de los Pobres (1964)
- Escuela para solteras (1965) – El desesperado
- Audaz y bravero (1965) – Cantante
- Me cansé de rogarle (1966)
- Arrullo de Dios (1967)
- El caudillo (1968) – Borrego
- La chamuscada (1971) – Revolucionario
- La loca de los milagros (1975) – (final film role)
