= List of Mexican singers =

This is a list of Mexican singers:

== Female ==
- Aida Cuevas
- Aleida Núñez
- Alejandra Guzmán
- Alessandra Rosaldo
- Alicia Villarreal
- Alix Bauer
- Ally Brooke
- Amalia Mendoza
- Amanda Miguel
- Amparo Ochoa
- Ana Bárbara
- Ana Gabriel
- Ana Victoria
- Anahí
- Ángela Aguilar
- Angélica Aragón
- Angélica María
- Angélica Rivera
- Angélica Vale
- Aracely Arámbula
- Ashley Grace
- Becky G
- Beatriz Adriana
- Belinda Peregrín
- Betsy Pecanins
- Bianca Marroquín
- Bibi Gaytán
- Blanca Estela Pavón
- Camila Sodi
- Camila Cabello
- Carla Morrison
- Chavela Vargas
- Chayito Valdez
- Chiquis Rivera
- Concha Michel
- Consuelo Velázquez
- Cynthia Rodríguez
- Dalia Inés
- Danna Paola
- Daniela Castro
- Daniela Luján
- Daniela Romo
- Denisse Guerrero
- Diana Reyes
- Dulce María
- Edith Márquez
- Eiza González
- Ely Guerra
- Eugenia León
- Fey
- Flor Silvestre
- Gloria Trevi
- Graciela Beltrán
- Guadalupe Pineda
- Hanna Nicole
- Irán Castillo
- Irma Dorantes
- Irma Serrano
- Itatí Cantoral
- Julieta Venegas
- Jenni Rivera
- Karol Sevilla
- Karol G
- Kenia OS
- Kim Loaiza
- Laura Zapata
- La Prieta Linda
- Lety López
- Lila Downs
- Lidia Ávila
- Litzy
- Lola Beltrán
- Lorena Herrera
- Lucero
- Lucía Méndez
- Lucha Reyes
- Lucha Villa
- Lupita D'Alessio
- Lynda Thomas
- Maite Perroni
- Marcela Bovio
- Marcela Rubiales
- María José
- María de Lourdes
- María Victoria
- Mariana Garza
- Mariana Levy
- Mariana Seoane
- Maribel Guardia
- Mary Jiménez
- Mon Laferte
- Natalia Lafourcade
- Ninel Conde
- Niurka Marcos
- Paquita la del Barrio
- Patricia Manterola
- Patricia Navidad
- Paulina Rubio
- Paty Cantú
- Pilar Montenegro
- Tania Libertad
- Tatiana
- Tehua
- Thalía
- Verónica Castro
- San Cha
- Sara Ramirez
- Sasha Sokol
- Selena
- Selma Oxor
- Ximena Sariñana
- Yolanda Pérez
- Vianey Valdez
- Yuri
- Yuridia

== Male ==
- Adán Sánchez
- Agustín Lara
- Agustín Arana
- Alejandro Fernández
- Alejandro Ibarra
- Aleks Syntek
- Ariel Camacho
- Arturo Meza
- Álex Lora
- Alexander Acha
- Alfonso Herrera
- Alfredo Olivas
- Antonio Aguilar
- Antonio Aguilar Jr.
- Armando Manzanero
- Baby Bash
- Benito Castro
- Benny Ibarra
- Beto Quintanilla
- Bobby Larios
- Caloncho
- Carlos Santana
- Celso Piña
- Cepillín
- César Costa
- Claudio Bermudez
- Cristian Castro
- Chalino Sánchez
- Chetes
- Chico Che
- Chino Pacas
- Christian Nodal
- Christopher Uckerman
- Cornelio Reyna
- Cuco Sánchez
- David Cavazos
- David Záizar
- Diego Schoening
- Eduardo Capetillo
- El Coyote
- El Chapo de Sinaloa
- El Potro de Sinaloa
- El Tigrillo Palma
- Emmanuel
- Enrique Guzmán
- Erik Rubin
- Espinoza Paz
- Eulalio González
- Felipe Arriaga
- Fernando Delgadillo
- Fernando de la Mora
- Fher Olvera
- Francisco Gabilondo Soler
- Frankie J
- Gualberto Castro
- Gerardo Ortíz
- Gerardo Reyes
- Germán Valdés
- Guillermo Velázquez
- Gabito Ballesteros
- Imanol Landeta
- Iván Cornejo
- Jaime Camil
- Javier Solís
- Jean Duverger
- Jessie Morales
- Jesús Rasgado
- Joan Sebastian
- Jorge Negrete
- José Alfredo Jiménez
- José Ángel Espinoza
- José Guadalupe Esparza
- José José
- José Mojica
- José Manuel Figueroa
- Juan Gabriel
- Juan Mendoza
- Juan Rivera
- Julión Álvarez
- Julio Preciado
- Junior H
- Larry Hernandez
- Leonardo Aguilar
- Lorenzo de Monteclaro
- Luis R. Conriquez
- Luis Coronel
- Luis Miguel
- Luis Pérez Meza
- Lupillo Rivera
- Marco Antonio Muñiz
- Marco Antonio Solís
- Miguel Aceves Mejía
- Mario Quintero Lara
- Natanael Cano
- Netón Vega
- Nati Cano
- Óscar Chávez
- Óscar Maydon
- Pablo Montero
- Pedro Infante
- Pepe Aguilar
- Pedro Fernández
- Peso Pluma
- Pedro Tovar
- Polo Urías
- Ramón Ayala
- Regulo Caro
- Remmy Valenzuela
- Reyli
- Rigo Tovar
- Roberto Cantoral
- Roberto Gomez Bolaños
- Roberto Tapia
- Salvador Flores Rivera
- Samo
- Saul Hernández
- Sergio Gómez
- Sergio Vega
- Tito Guízar
- Tito Double P
- Tito Torbellino
- Valentin Elizalde
- Vicente Fernández
- Xavi
- Yahir Othon

== See also ==
- Music of Mexico
