= Majo Aguilar =

Mexican singer and songwriter (born 1994)

- Majo Aguilar in 2025

Background information
- Born: María José Aguilar Carrillo; 7 June 1994 (age 32); Mexico City, Mexico
- Genres: Mariachi; pop
- Occupations: Singer, songwriter
- Instrument: Vocals
- Years active: 2016–present
- Label: Universal Music Mexico

María José "Majo" Aguilar Carrillo (born 7 June 1994) is a Mexican singer and songwriter. She is currently signed to Universal Music Group.

Aguilar's first extended play, Tributo (2017), is a musical tribute to her grandparents Antonio Aguilar and Flor Silvestre. She then signed with Universal Music and co-wrote the tracks of her second extended play, Soy (2019).

"No voy a llorar" (2021), the first single of her debut studio album, reached No. 1 on the Billboard Mexico Popular Airplay chart. Aguilar has been nominated for two Latin Grammy Awards.

== Biography ==
María José Aguilar Carillo is a member of the Aguilar family, also known as "the Aguilar dynasty." She is the daughter of singer and actor Antonio Aguilar, hijo, and a paternal granddaughter of singers Antonio Aguilar and Flor Silvestre, two stars of Mexico's Golden Age of Mexican cinema.

Her uncle Pepe Aguilar, cousins Emiliano Aguilar Analiz Aguilar Leonardo Aguilar and Angela Aguilar and aunts Dalia Inés and Marcela Rubiales, are also singers.

== Career ==
In 2015, Majo recorded the single "Lo busqué" with her cousins Leonardo and Ángela Aguilar.

In 2016, she began producing, recording, and uploading her own music. She uploaded the music video for her first single, "Triste recuerdo", on 3 July. She recorded a cover version of her grandmother's signature song, "Mi destino fue quererte", on 27 October, and it is currently one of the most viewed videos on her YouTube channel.

In 2017, she released her first extended play, Tributo, which includes cover versions of her grandmother's hits "Cielo rojo" and "Cruz de olvido" and her grandfather's hits "Albur de amor" and "Triste recuerdo", as well as two songs she wrote ("Alas" and "Extraño").

In 2019, Aguilar signed a recording contract with Universal Music Group and released her third single, "Un ratito", on 25 July. She released her fourth single, "Quiero verte bailar", on 29 August. She released her second extended play, Soy (Spanish for "I Am"), in November. Soy includes six songs she wrote (including "Un ratito" and "Quiero verte bailar") and blends various genres, including pop and tropical music.

In October 2020, she began a series of videos called Sesiones en casa in which she performs acoustic versions of some Mexican music hits. The first video, "La media vuelta", was released that same month. Two other videos, "Cielo rojo" and "Amor eterno", were recorded at her paternal grandparents' ranch.

== Discography ==
=== Singles ===
- "Los busqué" (2015) (with Leonardo and Ángela Aguilar)
- "Cielo rojo (2016)
- "Un ratito" (2019)
- "Quiero verte bailar" (2019)
- "Un beso a medias" (2020) (with El Bebeto and Vicente Fernández, Jr.)
- "Tik tik tik" (2021) (with Aarón y su Grupo Ilusión)
- "No voy a llorar" (2021)
- "Me vale" (2021)
- "En toda la chapa" (2021)
- "Asi es la vida" (2021)
- "Amor ilegal" (2021)
- "Amigos" (2021)
- "Navidad, Feel The Magic" (2021)
- "Hasta Que Regress" (2022) (with Los Rumberos and ElArturo)
- "Mi Meta Contigo (Versión Mariachi)" (2022) (with Banda Los Sebastianes De Saúl Plata)
- "Te Lo Dije" (2022) (with Nabález)
- "Si Nos Dejan (En Vivo Desde Pa'l Norte)" (2022)
- "Culpable O No (En Vivo Desde Pa'l Norte)" (2022)
- "Morí" (2022)
- "Te Mentiría" (2022)
- "No Te Apartes De Mí" (2022)
- "Tómbola" (2022)
- "Triste recuerdo" (2023)
- "Un Puño de Tierra" (2023) (with Antonio Aguilar, hijo)
- "Canción Para Olvidarte" (2023)
- "Nadie Como Tú" (2023)
- "Nada de Ti" (2023) (with Ana Bárbara)
- "Me Vas A Llorar" (2023)
- "Se Solicita" (2023)
- "Luna Azul" (2024) (with Santa Fe Klan)
- "Cuéntame" (2024) (with Alex Fernández)
- "Ya Te Superé - Volume 2" (2024) (with Sofia Castro)
- "Aún Así Te Vas" (2024)
- "A Ningún Lugar" (2025) (with Zemmoa)

=== Extended plays ===
- Tributo (2017)
- Soy (2019)
- Una Buena Ranchera (2022)
- México Mi Amor (2023)

=== Studio albums ===
- Mi herencia, mi sangre (2021)
- Se canta con el corazón (2022)
- Se canta con el corazón (Deluxe) (2023)
- Mariachi Y Tequila (2023)
- Mariachi Y Tequila (Deluxe) (2024)

=== Appearances ===
- "¿Por qué dejaste que te amara?" (2021) from El Bebeto's album Cuando te enamores
