= Grupo Frontera political controversy =

2025 American political controversy

"La Abuela Frontera" dancing to "Y.M.C.A." while discussing with other relatives, the video that caused the backlash

The American regional Mexican band Grupo Frontera was involved in a controversy due to an alleged endorsement of the politician and current United States president Donald Trump since early 2025, after a video of one of the vocalists' relatives performing a "Trump dance" to the Village People's "Y.M.C.A." went viral. Despite answers in an interview with El País, fans interpreted it as an endorsement of Trump from the group, and later allegedly discovered videos containing support and a deleted TikTok of them dancing to the same song. Considering them clear evidence of the accusations, the users started to cancel and boycott the band on social media, calling them "traitors" and asking for a cancellation of one of their festival performances through Change.org.

The band responded twice to the controversy in February 2025 through Instagram denying any endorsement, responding to other accusations and confirming their support of the Mexican community, declarations that received mainly negative reactions from the public, arguing that they were only an attempt to maintain the group's reputation among fans. The controversy also received attention from Pepe Aguilar's sons, Emiliano and Leonardo Aguilar, and online media.

== Background and backlash ==
An interview with Grupo Frontera by Raúl Novoa in Madrid about their career achievements and experiences was published through El País on January 5, 2025. For the question about the candidate Donald Trump's re-election as the US president, Juan Javier Cantú answered: "We rarely get involved in politics. It's very controversial for us and we just want to make music." Cantú and Alberto "Beto" Acosta highlighted their donation of toys for children to a community centre for immigrants that were deported by the border policies. Regarding the Mexico–United States wall, Acosta shared the band's disagreement and Julián Peña Jr. opined about its inconclusion.

Later that month, a video went viral on social media, wherein the band's vocalist Adelaido "Payo" Solís' grandmother, alias "La Abuela Frontera" (lit. 'The Grandma Frontera'), dances in a similar way to Trump to the Village People's "Y.M.C.A." with other relatives, a song used by Trump for his 2024 presidential campaign. This caused outrage among their fans on social media, with critics calling for their cancellation. In addition, the "La Abuela Frontera" account disappeared on TikTok. During the period in which the video was going viral, a user on the same platform by the name of Sarah Jasmine claimed that the group deleted videos in which they had explicitly endorsed the politician and sympathized with his politics. As a result, they received a significant drop in followers, an influx of hate comments and accusations of being Latinos for Trump and betraying their core audience.

Fans called for the group to be canceled, for their presence to be rejected in Mexico and for others to refrain from consuming any content related to them, including songs, videos and live performances. Videos of booing at one of their recent concerts and screencasts showing the personal Instagram accounts of some members following Trump's profile and liking his posts also circulated online. Furthermore, some users noticed that they deleted a TikTok video dancing to the same song as Solís' grandmother, considering them explicit evidence of an endorsement. On February 11, a petition on the American website Change.org was published by alias "Espíritu" (lit. 'Spirit') to cancel Grupo Frontera's participation at the 2025 edition of the Chicago Latin music festival Sueños. The petition accumulated over 9,700 signatures the next day. Sueños co-founder Christopher Den Uijl affirmed on Instagram the festival's support to the Latino community and stated that none of the co-founders are supporters of the president, without mentioning anything related to the group.

== Band's response ==
After a few weeks without communication on the subject and publishing a video of a US crowd singing "Bebé Dame", described by media as an indirect response, (Note: According to Infobae and Milenio.) on February 7, the band published a statement through Instagram stories, arguing that "[they do not have] affiliation nor alliance with any political party that [is] against immigrants and the Latino community". In addition, they clarified that they and their families are immigrants and come from the frontier, as well as their support to Mexicans and that "opinions of [their] friends and family [do not] represent [the band]". Furthermore, in an interview with Jesse Cervantes for EXA FM, the group affirmed their commitment to the immigrant community and their pride in Mexican culture, "without distinction of ideologies and borders". On the 37th Lo Nuestro Awards' red carpet, the Cuban-American television presenter Raúl de Molina asked them about the controversy, a question that visibly made the band appear uncomfortable. Peña's response to it, "We dedicate ourselves to music. We love everyone and want peace and love. Take care of yourselves", was called "poor" and linked by fans to the rumors of their support of Trump. On February 22, they published a video on the same network affirming the statement. In the same video, Acosta said that their silence was for the huge amount of "fake news" spread on the Internet, therefore they did not know how to answer. In addition, they clarified that the dance video was only a backstage routine during their past concert tour, Jugando a Que No Pasa Nada Tour, wherein they danced to songs from their primary school period.

== Reactions, analysis, and aftermath ==
Other fans reacted against the massive cancellation and supported the band's freedom of speech, arguing that "cancel culture should not spread to those with different political opinions", according to Infobae Mexico's Víctor Cisneros. Juan Garza of Periódico ABC praised the way that the group managed the controversy and spoke against the backlash, also claiming that in many cases in the entertainment world the information spread on social media linking public figures to politicians was "erroneous". On the other hand, both the public and some online newspapers labeled the concert booing as fake with altered audio. (Note: According to Infobae and ADN.) In regards to the TikTok dance video, "Espíritu" admitted it did not amount to an explicit endorsement, but he said it was strategically implicit, while Chicago Sun-Times's staff opined that "[Donald Trump] and [Grupo Frontera] [...] [could] simply have similar tastes in music". The February 7 statement polarized fans' opinions, some applauding it and others arguing that it is not authentic and was only an attempt to maintain their reputation among fans. A representative of the group confirmed its authenticity. Similarly, the February 22 video received negative reactions from users, accusing it of the same as the statement and complaining that they never directly rejected Trump, also noticed by Rolling Stone's Tomás Mier. Leonelys Gomez of the Latin Times named the controversy as one of the band's biggest during their three-year career. Marca's staff linked it with Banda MS and Fuerza Regida's situation, emphasizing the personal opinions of some members of the respective bands. Many fans compared it with the Yahritza y su Esencia's 2023 backlash, when they visited Mexico and the vocalist Yahritza Martinez confessed controversial preferences, despising the country and Mexican cuisine, after which they stopped performing in the country.

=== Aguilar family conflict ===
After releasing "Ilegal", a protest song against Trump's mass deportation which received public acclaim and support from deported immigrants, Pepe Aguilar's son, Emiliano Aguilar, reacted through a series of Instagram stories in favor of the cancellation to the band, saying, "Fuck [Grupo Frontera]. Mexico must be respected". His half-brother, Leonardo, expressed his support to the band after they published the video, writing in the post comments, "[Do not worry]. We the fans [will still supporting you]. The rest are people without anything to do. [We] know who you are". Emiliano, who has conflicts with his family, commented on the same video with many Mexican flags and answered him: "Grupo 'Frontera', I could not care less. Pure Mexico". After that, he published another series of Instagram stories repeating his hatred of the band and referring to his brother as "Gallito Fino", relating his sympathy with an indifference to the immigrant community, arguing, "Here is a Mexican who dies for his people with firmness in his conviction. [...] You have always had everything, you have never lacked attention and love from the public". He finished saying that they had talked about the problem civilly in private, but Leonardo worsened the situation because "[he] already [roared]". According to La Razón's Mariana Garibay, the public complained that Emiliano may have been looking for controversies only in order to catch attention.
