= La Prieta Linda =

Mexican singer and actress (1933–2021)

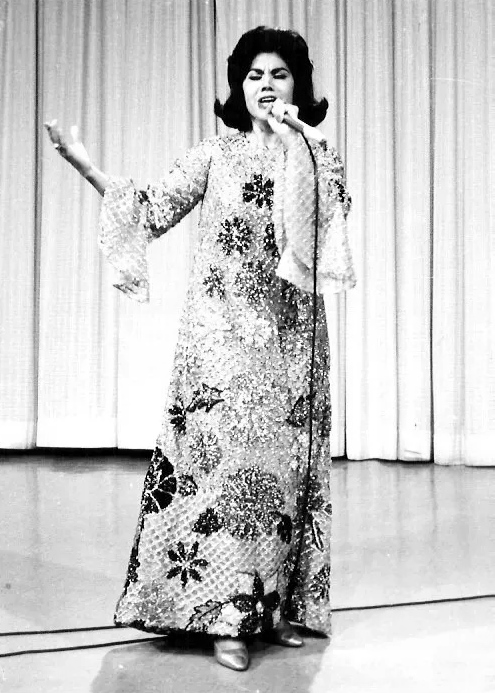
- Born: Enriqueta Jiménez Chabolla; 4 July 1933; Salamanca, Guanajuato, Mexico
- Died: 21 September 2021 (aged 88); Mexico City, Mexico
- Occupations: Singer; actress
- Years active: c. 1950–2001
- Spouse: Raúl Vieyra (m. 1960; died 2006)
- Children: 3
- Relatives: Flor Silvestre (sister); Mary Jiménez (sister); Dalia Inés (niece); Francisco Rubiales (nephew); Marcela Rubiales (niece); Antonio Aguilar, hijo (nephew); Pepe Aguilar (nephew); Antonio Aguilar (brother-in-law)
- Musical career
- Genres: Regional Mexican
- Instrument: Vocals
- Labels: Columbia; Peerless; RCA Víctor

Enriqueta "Queta" Jiménez Chabolla (4 July 1933 – 21 September 2021), known by her stage name La Prieta Linda ("The Beautiful Dark-skinned Woman"), was a Mexican singer and actress, whose specialty is the musical genre of Regional Mexican.

== Early life ==
La Prieta Linda was born on 4 July 1933 in Salamanca, Guanajuato, and later grew up in central Mexico City. She was the younger sister of singer and actress Guillermina Jiménez Chabolla "Flor Silvestre" (1930-2020) and the elder sister of singer Mary Jiménez.

== Career ==
La Prieta Linda, who owed her stage name to the famous comedian Clavillazo, debuted as a singer with Silvestre Vargas's mariachi. In 1950, her elder sister Flor Silvestre, who had already signed with Columbia Records' Mexican branch, invited her to form a duet named Las Flores; they recorded two songs—"Los desvelados" and "Lo traigo en la sangre" (with Rubén Fuentes' mariachi)—for Columbia. In 1952, La Prieta Linda recorded her first hit, "Quieto, capulín", for Columbia. Later, with the help of singer and actress Lola Beltrán, La Prieta Linda had her own radio programs and signed a contract with Peerless Records (Beltrán's record label). She made most of her 1950s recordings for Peerless, including some collaborations with Beltrán, David Záizar, and Juan Záizar. She appeared in her first film in the late 1950s. In the 1960s, she signed with RCA Víctor and recorded new hits such as "Mil cadenas" and "Al ver". In 1979, she won the first Ranchera Music Festival with the song "Amantes de una noche". Over the years Jiménez recorded over 40 albums and made various tours across Mexico and other countries. In her acting career, her comic role in the film Valente Quintero was highly notable since she gave a performance without singing.

== Personal life ==
She was the widow of the former Excélsior journalist Raúl Vieyra, who died in 2006. They had three daughters: Érika, Velia, and Isabel. Jiménez died on 21 September 2021 at the age of 88 in Mexico City.

== Discography ==
=== Singles ===
- "Quieto capulín" (Columbia, 1952)

=== Studio albums ===
- La Prieta Linda interpreta con el Mariachi Guadalajara de Silvestre Vargas y Hnos. Záizar (Peerless)
- "Canciones de América" en la voz de Queta Jiménez "La Prieta Linda" (Peerless)
- El peor de los caminos (Peerless)
- La Prieta Linda con el Mariachi Guadalajara de Silvestre Vargas (Peerless)
- La Prieta "Más" Linda: Queta Jiménez (RCA Víctor)

=== Compilation albums ===
- Los grandes éxitos de: Queta Jiménez La Prieta Linda (Peerless)
- Antología... Enriqueta Jiménez "La Prieta Linda" (Warner)
- Mexicanísimo: Queta Jiménez "La Prieta Linda" (Sony Music)

== Filmography ==
- El gallo colorado (1957)
- Bajo el cielo de México (1958)
- El tiro de gracia (1961)
- Duelo indio (1961)
- Enterrado vivo (1961)
- La máscara roja (1962)
- Juramento de sangre (1962)
- Matar o morir (1963)
- Los amigos Maravilla en el mundo de la aventura (1963)
- Los alegres Aguilares (1967)
- Valentín de la Sierra (1968)
- Valente Quintero (1973)
- Es mi vida (1982)
- Los pobres ilegales (1982)
- ¡Ora es cuando chile verde! (1986)
