= Ofrenda al Mictlan =

Ofrenda a Mictlan

Studio album by Juan Cirerol
- Released: May 7, 2009
- Recorded: 2008
- Genre: Folk
- Label: Vale Vergas Discos
- Producer: Doctor Bona Bonson

Juan Cirerol chronology
| No Mas Sirvo Pa' Cantar (2008) | Ofrenda a Mictlan (2009) | Haciendo Leña (2011) |

Ofrenda al Mictlan is the second album released by the singer-songwriter Juan Cirerol. The album was written entirely by Juan Cirerol, except for the two tracks "I Love You" and "Vida de Perro", which were written by "los Picadientes de Caborca".

The artwork was created by Gustavo A. Rodriguez Nava, a Mexico City based visual artist.

Ofrenda al Mictlan was recorded in 2008, while in Mexico City with the help of visual artist Txema Novelo, under the independent record label Vale Vergas Discos. The debut album immediately struck a chord with thousands of Mexican listeners who, like Cirerol, grew up loving the music and themes he touches upon. Whether talking about a beautiful chola (La Chola), about stealing money from his mom and taking pills (Clonazepam Blues), middle class bittersweet heartache (Crema Dulce, Clase Media), or issuing a Mexicali excessive heat warning (Hace Mucho Calor), the album includes what are now considered classics in the Mexican rock 'n' roll canon, such as the laid back pot smoking anthem Toque y Rol(which was rated the 17th best song of 2011 by Club Fonograma.) Ofrenda al Mictlan went from being a well-kept secret in the Vale Vergas Discos catalog to a distinguished cult album.

His song "Corrido Chicalor" was named in September 2011 by guardian.co.uk and the Music Alliance Pact, as one of the 35 best new tracks in the world.

This album, Ofrenda al Mictlan was very well received and the music critics at Club Fonograma rated it as the 11th best album of 2011.

== Track listing ==
All tracks are written by Juan Cirerol, except where noted.

| No. | Title | Lyrics | Music | Length |
|---|---|---|---|---|
| 1. | "La Banqueta" | | | 4:25 |
| 2. | "Como La Vez Carnal" | | | 4:04 |
| 3. | "Si Si" | | | 1:59 |
| 4. | "La Chola" | | | 2:19 |
| 5. | "Clonazepam Blues" | | | 3:03 |
| 6. | "Crema Dulce Clase Media" | | | 3:12 |
| 7. | "Maldita Maestra" | Dan Donahue | I Love You | 2:20 |
| 8. | "Toque Y Rol" | | | 2:48 |
| 9. | "I Love You" | | | 2:29 |
| 10. | "Claro Que No Morire" | | | 2:40 |
| 11. | "Hace Mucho Calor" | | | 3:42 |
| 12. | "Monterrey" | | | 3:26 |
| 13. | "Quiero Ver Mi Rostro" | | | 2:31 |
| 14. | "Vida De Perro" | | | 3:11 |
| 15. | "Yo Por Eso Me Retracto" | | | 3:53 |
