= Lupita Infante =

American singer-songwriter

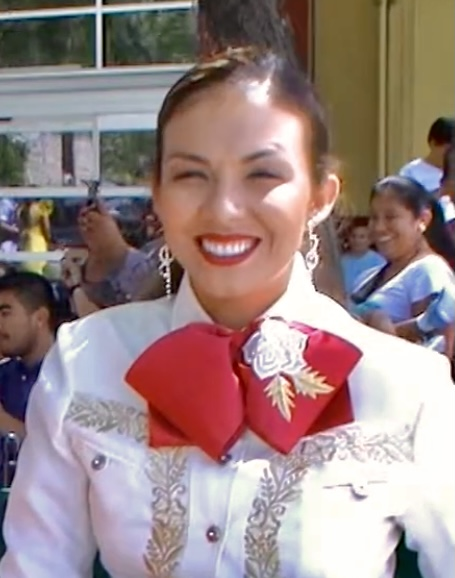
- Infante in 2015

Background information
- Born: Lupita Infante Esparza
- Origin: Downey, California, U.S.
- Genres: Mariachi, norteño, ranchera
- Occupation: Singer-songwriter
- Instrument: Vocals
- Label: Sony Music US Latin

Lupita Infante Esparza is a Mexican-American singer-songwriter. She sings traditional mariachi, norteño, and ranchera music. Her work blends classic Mexican musical traditions with a contemporary perspective. Infante's debut studio album "La Serenata" (2019) was nominated for a Grammy Award for Best Regional Mexican Music Album (including Tejano). In 2020, her song "Dejaré" was nominated for a Latin Grammy Award. In 2025, her song "¿Seguimos o No?" was nominated for a Latin Grammy Award. Infante advocates for women's empowerment through her music.

== Early life ==
Lupita Infante Esparza is the daughter of Marisol Esparza and actor Pedro Infante Torrentera. Her paternal grandparents are Mexican performers Lupita Torrentera and Pedro Infante. Infante's mother moved to the United States from Zacatecas when she was 16. Infante was raised in a working class family in Downey, California. While in college, Infante worked at a senior and community center where she would sometimes sing. She completed a degree in ethnomusicology at University of California, Los Angeles, in 2017. To pay for school, Infante was a driver for Uber and Lyft and worked as a music teacher.

== Career ==
Infante interview in 2015 (in Spanish)

In 2017, Infante was a finalist on La Voz. On the show, she chose Carlos Vives as her vocal coach. Infante was an opening act for Shaila Dúrcal and Beatriz Adriana. In June 2018, Infante performed at the Mariachi USA festival. In 2018, after releasing a cover of "Flor Sin Retoño", Infante signed with Peermusic.

During the COVID-19 pandemic in California, Infante recorded music videos in her front yard. She released her debut studio album La Serenata on September 27, 2019. It contains thirteen traditional mariachi and norteño songs including "Sabor a Mí", "Dejaré", "Ya Ni Me Acuerdo" and "Yo He Nacido Mexicano". In the album, she advocates for women's empowerment. In September 2020, Infante and Frankie J covered and released a music video of "Buenos Amigos" for his album, Canciones Que Recuerdo. In 2020, at the 21st Annual Latin Grammy Awards, her song "Dejaré" was nominated for a Best Regional Mexican Song. At the Latin Grammy Awards, Infante and José Hernández covered "Amorcito Corazón" as a tribute to her grandfather, Pedro Infante. In 2021, at the 63rd Annual Grammy Awards, her album, La Serenata was nominated for the Best Regional Mexican Music Album (including Tejano).

Infante was inspired by her father and grandfather to pursue singing traditional Mexican music. Her ranchera music is influenced by Chavela Vargas, Aida Cuevas, and Amalia Mendoza.

== Discography ==
=== Studio albums ===
- La Serenata (2019)
- Amor Como En Las Películas De Antes (2023)
- La Corona Es Mía (2025)
- Aunque Me Duela (2026)

=== Singles ===
- "Luna de Octubre" (2018)
- "Flor Sin Retoño" (2018)
- "Dejaré" (2020)
- "Buenos Amigos" (2020) with Frankie J
- "Amorcito Corazón" (2020) with José Hernández
- "Amémonos de Nuevo" (2025) with Leonardo Aguilar

== Awards and honors ==
In 2020, she was listed as one of the 100 Latina Powerhouses by Hola! USA.

Year	Awards	Category	Nominated work	Result	Ref.
2020	Latin Grammy Awards	Best Regional Mexican Song	"Dejaré"	Nominated	
2021	Grammy Awards	Best Regional Mexican Music Album (including Tejano)	La Serenata	Nominated	
2024	Grammy Awards	Best Música Mexicana Album (Including Tejano)	Amor Como En Las Películas De Antes	Nominated	
2025	Latin Grammy Awards	Best Regional Song	"¿Seguimos o No?"	Nominated	

== Personal life ==
Infante's father acted in over 80 films. On April 1, 2009, he died in a Los Angeles hospital as a result of 12 self-inflicted stab wounds. He is buried in a cemetery in Querétaro.
