= Negociaré con la pena =

EP by Pepe Aguilar
- Released: June 28, 2011 (Mexico); September 6, 2011 (United States)
- Genre: Latin pop
- Length: 23:15
- Label: Sony Music Latin

Pepe Aguilar chronology
Bicentenario (2010)	Negociaré con la pena (2011)	Más de un Camino (2013)

Negociaré con la pena is the first EP recorded by American singer-songwriter Pepe Aguilar.

Negociaré con la pena reached number 27 on the Billboard Top Latin Albums chart and number 19 on the Billboard Regional Mexican Albums chart in the United States. It was certified gold in Mexico. The recording received a Latin Grammy nomination for Best Traditional Pop Album at the 13th Annual Latin Grammy Awards in 2012.

== Reception ==
Professional ratings
Review scores
Source	Rating
AllMusic	3.4/5 stars

Alex Henderson of Allmusic gave the album 3.5 stars; he described it as "enjoyable". The recording received a Latin Grammy nomination for Best Traditional Pop Album at the 13th Annual Latin Grammy Awards in 2012, but lost to David Bisbal's Una Noche en el Teatro Real.

== Commercial release ==
Negociaré con la pena reached number 27 on the Billboard Top Latin Albums chart and number 19 on the Billboard Regional Mexican Albums chart in the United States. It was certified gold by the Asociación Mexicana de Productores de Fonogramas y Videogramas in Mexico.

== Track listing ==
No.	Title	Writer(s)	Length
1.	"Para que no me duela tanto (Negociaré con la pena)"	Enrique Guzmán Yáñez	3:34
2.	"Un privilegio"	Enrique Guzmán Yáñez	4:08
3.	"Prometiste"	José Antonio Aguilar Jiménez, Jesus "Chuy" Flores, and Nir Seroussi	3:35
4.	"Si no me amas"	Enrique Guzmán Yáñez	4:32
5.	"Yo sin ti"	Enrique Guzmán Yáñez	2:55
6.	"Ni contigo, ni sin ti"	José Antonio Aguilar Jiménez, Jorge E. Murguia P, and Mauricio López De Arriaga	4:40
7.	"Ni contigo, ni sin ti" (SarrasDeli Remix)	José Antonio Aguilar Jiménez, Jorge E. Murguia P, and Mauricio López De Arriaga	5:54
8.	"Prometiste" (SarrasDeli Remix)	José Antonio Aguilar Jiménez, Jesús "Chuy" Flores, and Nir Seroussi	6:18
Total length:			23:15

== Credits ==
=== Musicians ===
- Andy Abad - Bandurria, Guitar
- Antonio Aguilar - Composer, Director, Engineer, Primary Artist, Vocals, Producer
- Pepe Aguilar - Primary Artist, Vocals
- Cheche Alara - Arranger, Director, Hammond B3, Keyboards, Piano, Programmer, Wurlitzer
- Jon Button - Bass
- Luis Conte - Percussion
- Randy Cooke - Drums
- George Doering - Bouzouki, Guitar (Acoustic), Hammer Dulcimer, Mandolin
- Chuy Flores - Arranger, Engineer, Guitar (Electric), Producer
- Martín Flores - Drums
- Ruy Folguera - Keyboards, Piano, Programmer
- Enrique Guzman Yanez - Arranger, Composer, Director, Guitar (Acoustic), Producer
- Reggie Hamilton - Double Bass
- James Harrah - Guitar (Electric)
- Gyongyi Horvath - Violin
- Pipe Javier - Guitar (Electric)
- Cary Park - Guitar, Mandolin
- Tim Pierce - Guitars
- John "J.R." Robinson - Drums
- Michael Severenf - Cello, Viola
- Leland Sklar - Bass
- Maksim Toktalievich - Violin
- Jorge Luis Torres - Violin
- Mark Tovar - Arranger, Piano, Programmer
- Ray Yslas - Percussion

=== Production ===
- Cristina Abaroa - Copyist, Production Coordination
- Antonio Aguilar - Composer, Director, Engineer, Primary Artist, Producer
- Cheche Alara - Arranger, Director, Hammond B3, Keyboards, Piano, Programmer, Wurlitzer
- Gustavo Borner - Engineer
- Chuy Flores - Arranger, Engineer, Guitar (Electric), Producer
- Jesus "Chuy" Flores - Composer
- Humberto Gatica - Digital Engineer, Engineer
- Enrique Guzman Yanez - Arranger, Composer, Director, Guitar (Acoustic), Producer
- Mauricio Lopez Arriaga Hernandez - Composer
- Seth Atkins Horan - Engineer
- Caesar Lima - Photography
- Israel Lomelí - Assistant
- Ben O'Neill - Assistant
- MiMi "Audio" Parker - Assistant
- Jorge Eduardo Murguia Pedraza - Composer
- Jason Pires - Art Direction
- Christian Robles - Digital Engineer
- Cristián Robles - Digital Engineer
- Eddy Schreyer - Mastering
- Bruce Sugar - Engineer
- Paula Tabalipa - Design
- Mark Tovar - Arranger, Piano, Programmer
- Sadaharu Yagi - Assistant

== Charts ==
=== Weekly charts ===
Chart (2012)	Peak position
US Top Latin Albums (Billboard)	27
US Regional Mexican Albums (Billboard)	19

== Certifications ==
Region	Certification	Certified units/sales
Mexico (AMPROFON)	Gold	30,000^{^}
^{^} Shipments figures based on certification alone.
