= Mariachi Divas de Cindy Shea =

Mariachi Divas
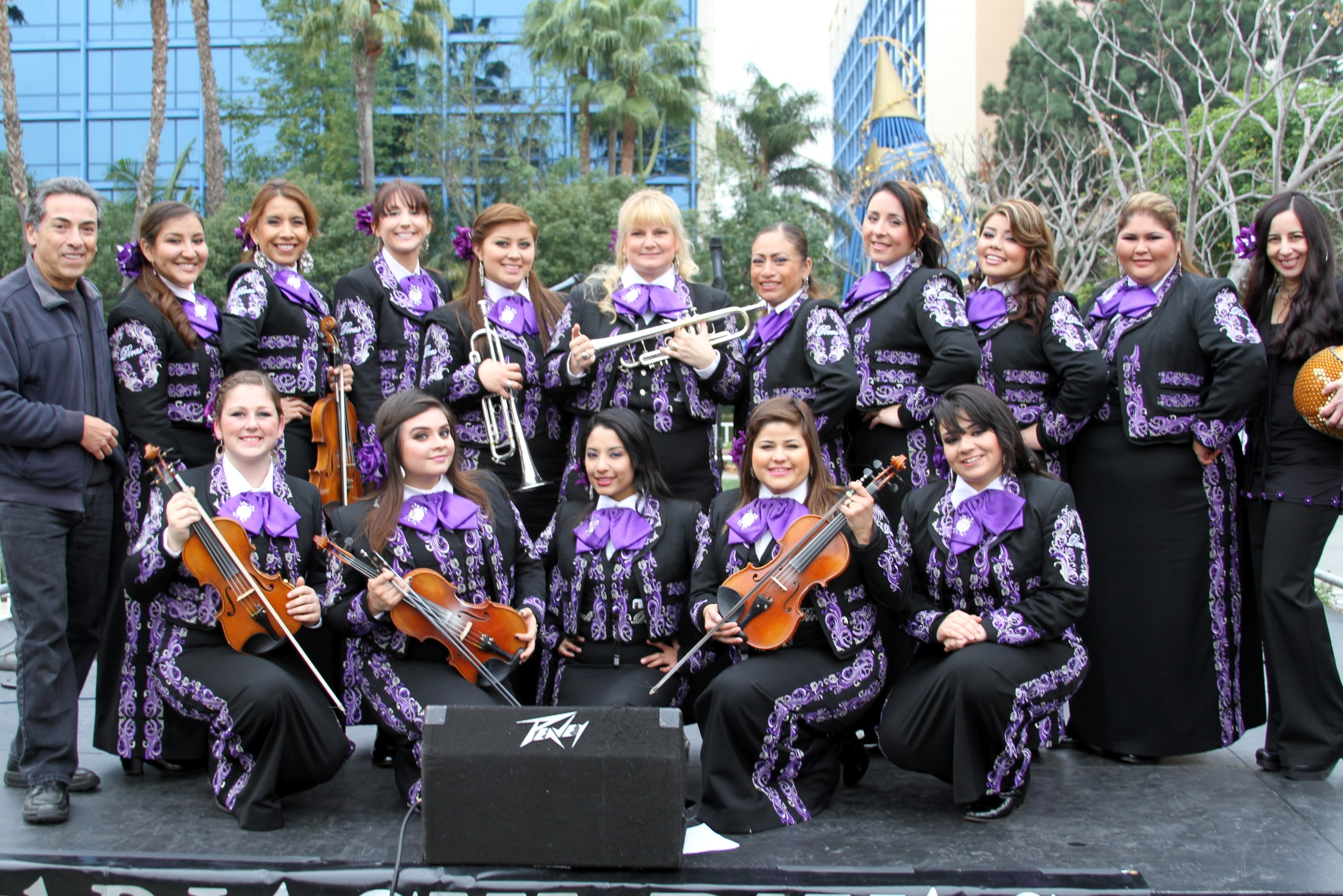

Background information
- Years active: 1999–present

The Mariachi Divas de Cindy Shea is an all-female mariachi band based in Los Angeles, California. The band was founded in 1999 by Cindy Shea. In 2009, they became the first all-female mariachi band ever to be nominated for a Grammy Award, and the first to win one. As of 2016, the band has been nominated for seven Grammy Awards, winning twice. They are the official mariachi band of the Disneyland resort. In May 2014, they headlined the opening of a new dinner theater in Anaheim, California dedicated exclusively to mariachi music.

== Early career ==
From a very young age, Cindy Shea aspired to become a professional musician. In an interview with the San Gabriel Valley Tribune, she said, "I told my parents when I was only 8 years old that I wanted to become one of the world's best trumpet players." Wanting more lessons, and with more exclusive instructors, than her parents could finance, she began teaching lessons herself to raise the money. She ultimately studied with the likes of Ron Stout, Wayne Bergeron, Bobby Shew, Bill Bing, and Arturo Sandoval. In the male-dominated mariachi music culture, Shea has encountered opposition. As an outstanding player even as a high-schooler, she was a victim of pranks and was told to give up trumpet because it was "too macho".

== Mariachi Divas ==
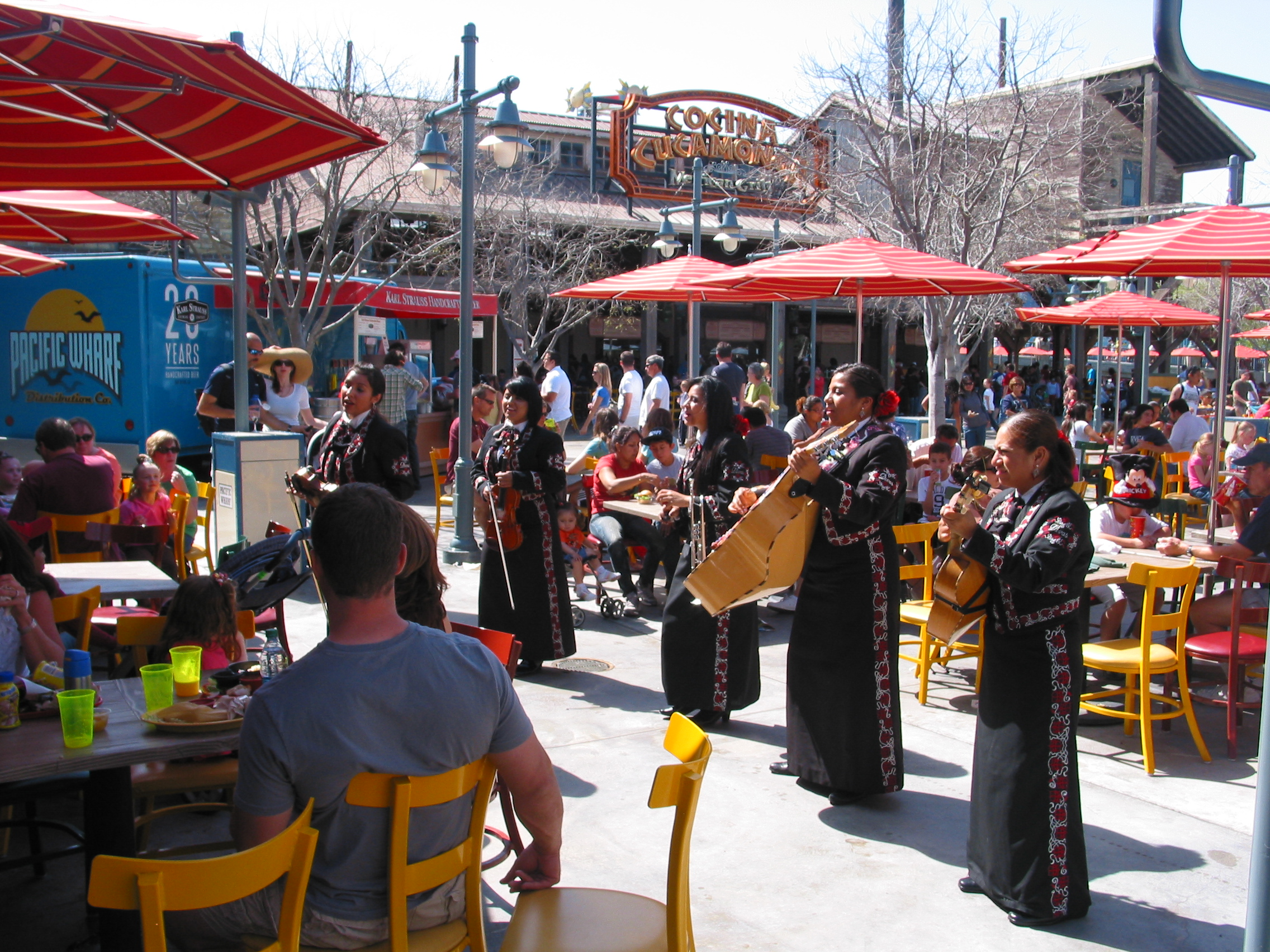
Mariachi Divas performing at Disney California Adventure Park

In the early 1990s, Shea obtained a professional gig as trumpet player for an all-female mariachi band called Mariachi Las Alondras. When that band broke up in 1999, she formed another, calling the group Mariachi Divas. A big break for the new group came in September 2003, when they were discovered by Stan Freese, talent booking director for Disney Resorts, and became the official mariachi band of Disneyland Resort. They quickly became a fixture at Disney's California Adventure theme park and Downtown Disney's "Tortilla Joe" restaurant. They went on to headline Disney festivals such as the holiday-themed "Viva Navidad". Of his choice to spotlight an all-female mariachi band, Freese said, "I try to give our guests something they won’t see anywhere else. The Mariachi Divas are great performers."

== Grammy nominations and awards ==
In the meantime, the Mariachi Divas were experiencing success as recording artists as well. In 2009, with their album Canciones De Amor, they made history as the first all-female mariachi band ever to be nominated for a Grammy Award; they went on to win the award that year for Best Regional Mexican Music Album. As of the 2017 Grammy Awards season, seven further nominations followed (Grammy Awards and Latin Grammy Awards combined):

- 2010 – 10 Aniversario, nominated for Grammy: Best Regional Mexican Album of the Year
- 2012 – Órale, nominated for Grammy: Best Regional Mexican Album of the Year
- 2012 – Ay Mi Mexico (from the album Oye), nominated for Latin Grammy: Best Regional Mexican Song of the Year
- 2013 – Oye, nominated for Grammy: Best Regional Mexican Album of the Year
- 2014 - A Mi Manera, nominated for Best Regional Mexican Music Album (Including Tejano) - WON
- 2015 - 15 Aniversario, nominated for Best Regional Mexican Music Album (Including Tejano)
- 2017 - Tributo a Joan Sebastian y Rigoberto Alfaro, nominated for Best Regional Mexican Music Album (Including Tejano)
- 2020 - 20 Aniversario (Best Regional Mexican Music Album (Including Tejano))

== Notable performances ==
Some of the notable and featured live performances by the Mariachi Divas include:

- Premio La Gente Awards (The LA Forum, 2005)
- Alma Awards (The Shrine Auditorium, 2006)
- National Association of Music Merchants (NAMM) convention (Anaheim, California, yearly since 2001)
- Fiesta Broadway – world's largest Cinco de Mayo celebration (Downtown Los Angeles, 2003 & 2004)
- Inaugurations of Los Angeles mayor Antonio Villaraigosa and California governor Arnold Schwarzenegger
- State luncheon for the President of Mexico (Sacramento, California, 2008)
- Hillary Clinton presidential campaign rally (Los Angeles, 2008)
- Command performance for the President of South Korea (2008)

They have collaborated with other well-known artists on numerous occasions as well, including Joan Sebastian, Jenni Rivera, Marco Antonio Solis, Pablo Montero, Graciela Beltran, Paulina Rubio, and Mariachi Vargas.

Television appearances include Despierta America, Cristina, Control, Primer Impacto, Let's Make A Deal, Sábado Gigante, BBQ with Bobby Flay, 12 Corazones, Bienvenido a Casa, The Disney Family Singalong Volume II and A Celebration of the Music of Coco.

In May 2014, the Mariachi Divas were announced as the headline act of Centro del Mariachi, a new all-mariachi themed dinner theater two miles south of Disney resort (reclaiming the site of 2012's failed Battle of the Dance).
