= Vianey Valdez =

- Born: 1943 (age 82–83)
- Origin: Mexico
- Occupation: Singer
- Instrument: voice
- Labels: Peerless, Eco, Oasis, Musart

Vianey Valdez is a Mexican singer who recorded for the Peerless, Eco, Oasis and Musart labels. She had a number of top ten hits in her country.

== Background ==
Vianey Valdez was discovered by Peerless Records. Years later she was recognized for her musical contribution.

== Career ==
=== 1960s ===
Valdez recorded the song "Sin" which was backed with "Trucutu" and released on Peerless 45/7759 in 1962.

Vianey Valdez recorded the single "Muevanse Todos" ("Twist and Shout"). Backed with "Se Mi Gran Carino" ("Be My Baby"), it was released on Peerless 45/8099. Her single "Muevanse Todos", as recorded by Billboard made its debut at no. 8 in the Mexico chart for the week of 4 July 1964. For the week of 1 August 1964, "Muevanse Todos" was at no. 4 in the Mexican chart.

It was noted in 29 August 1964 issue of Cash Box that Valdez and the Los Apson Boys had returned from a successful tour of the Northern cities. Her single was also at no. 9 in the Mexico's Best Sellers chart.

For the week of 21 November 1964 her single, "Tu Seras Mi Babi" was at no. 3 on the Cash Box Mexico's Best Sellers chart. It was still at that position the following week. Peerless had also announced the new release of her single "Ya no lo Aguanto". The record translated into English was "It's My Party". It was backed with Te Fue Dificil ("I Only Want to Be with You)" and released on Peerless 45/8245. The recordings were directed by Ed Chalpin.

Also in 1964, her album, Mis Siete Novios was released on Eco Eco-262. It was produced by Ed Chalpin.

According to the 13 February 1965 issue of Cash Box, Valdez had cut a new album at Peerless. At the time it was referred to as Una Rebelde Encantadors. The songs included, "Te Fue Dificil", "Dicen Que . . .", "Desilucion", and "Nuestra Cancion".

According to the 5 June 1965 issue of Cash Box, Vianey Valdez, La Prieta Linda, Ricard Jimenez would be leaving their label, Peerless Records and signing with other labels.

=== 1970s ===
Her single "Muevanse Todos" was released on the Chain label in 1976.

== Later years ==
In 2023, Valdez, referred to as the "queen of rock and roll" returned to the stage. She was at the Pavilion M Auditorium in Monterrey.

It was announced that on 1 March 2025, a free concert was to take place at Monumento a la Revolución. During the event, a tribute to past Mexican rockers, Rita Guerrero, Angélica María, Angélica Infante, Las Hermanas Jiménez, Betsy Pecanins, Las Mary Jets, Hebe Rosell, Julissa, Leda Moreno, Ela Laboriel, Gloria Ríos and Vianey Valdez was scheduled.
