= Más de un Camino =

EP by Pepe Aguilar
- Released: May 29, 2012 (United States); June 5, 2012 (Mexico)
- Studio: Castle Oaks Recording, Farias Productions, Steakhouse Recording
- Genre: Mariachi * Pop
- Length: 26:00
- Label: Sony Music Latin

Pepe Aguilar chronology
Negociaré con la pena (2011)	Más de un Camino (2012)	Lástima Que Sean Ajenas (2014)

Más de un Camino is the second EP recorded by Mexican-American singer-songwriter Pepe Aguilar.

Más de un Camino reached number 18 on the Billboard Top Latin Albums chart and number ten on the Billboard Regional Mexican Albums chart in the United States. The recording won a Latin Grammy Award for Best Ranchero Album at the 13th Annual Latin Grammy Awards in 2012.

== Reception and commercial release ==
The recording won a Latin Grammy Award for Best Ranchero Album at the 13th Annual Latin Grammy Awards in 2012. Negociaré con la pena reached number 18 on the Billboard Top Latin Albums chart and number ten on the Billboard Regional Mexican Albums chart in the United States.

== Track listing ==
No.	Title	Writer(s)	Length
1.	"Lado obscuro"	Enrique Guzmán Yañez "Fato"	4:21
2.	"Le pido a Dios"	Reyli & Ferra	3:48
3.	"Amor en secreto"	Alfredo Jiménez	2:45
4.	"Maldito"	Leonel García	3:11
5.	"Creo en ti"	Estéfano, Julio C. Reyes	3:59
6.	"Con otro sabor"	Roberto Fausto	3:51
7.	"Que desesperación"	Marco Antonio Solís	4:00
Total length:			26:00

== Charts ==
Chart (2012)	Peak position
US Top Latin Albums (Billboard)	18
US Regional Mexican Albums (Billboard)	10
