= Discos Intolerancia =

- Founded: 1996
- Founder: Gerardo Gerry Rosado
- Genre: Rock, jazz, improvisation
- Country of origin: Mexico
- Location: Mexico City

Discos Intolerancia (in Spanish: Intolerancia Records) is an independent record label based in Mexico City, Mexico. Established in 1996, was founded by Mexican rock and jazz musicians aiming to have an alternative label to mainstream circuit.

== History ==
Discos Intolerancia was established in 1996 by Gerardo Gerry Rosado, Mexican musician and producer of Consumatum est, a famous rock band in 90s. He had as motivation the recording and distribution of artists of different genres related to rock, jazz and improvisation and expressions around these genres, which have no place in large companies. The first major release of the label was Merlina from La Gusana Ciega. Then, the first artist to be certified Gold in Mexico for Intolerancia was Carla Morrison with her first album Déjenme llorar.

From 2006 Intolerancia make an alliance to expand the reach of their catalogue in Latin America.

In addition to the recording and publishing of albums, Discos Intolerancia performs activities in support of the musicians it represents, such as participating in music festivals as SXSW, Glastonbury, Rock al Parque, And Vive Latino. In this latter the label curates an artistic program at Carpa Intolerante stage; they also collaborate with Ibero 90.9 radio station with acoustic sessions recorded at Clickaporte show.

Anthropologist Néstor García Canclini called the label a trendsetter in Mexico, and the specialized press has referred Intolerancia as "a reference in the musical avant-garde scene".

== Roster ==
- Alex Otaola
- Alonso Arreola
- Carla Morrison
- Dapuntobeat
- Descartes a Kant
- Fratta
- Guillotina
- Kill Aniston
- Juan Cirerol
- Juan Pablo Villa
- Los Dorados
- Los Ezquisitos
- Max Capote
- Motor
- Paté de Fuá
- San Pascualito Rey
- Salón Victoria
- Santa Sabina
- Sonex
- Telefunka
- Troker
