= Historias de Mi Tierra =

Studio album by Pepe Aguilar
- Released: October 18, 2005
- Genre: Regional Mexican
- Label: Sony BMG Norte
- Producer: Pepe Aguilar

Pepe Aguilar chronology
Mi Historia (2005)	Historias de Mi Tierra (2005)	Enamorado (2006)

Historias de Mi Tierra (Stories of My Land) is a studio album released by Mexican performer Pepe Aguilar. It was released in October 18, 2005 by Sony BMG. Aguilar was awarded the Best Mexican/Mexican-American Album at the 49th Grammy Awards and Best Ranchero Album at the Latin Grammy Awards of 2006.

== Track listing ==
No.	Title	Writer(s)	Length
1.	"Dos Amigos"	Benjamín Sánchez Motal	3:17
2.	"Corrido de Chihuahua"	Felipe Bermejo, Pedro DeLille	3:12
3.	"El Federal de Caminos"	Reynaldo Martínez Ledezma	2:46
4.	"El Cachanilla (Puro Cachanilla)"	Antonio Valdez Herrera	3:37
5.	"El Perro Negro"	José Alfredo Jiménez	3:05
6.	"Bohemio de Afición"	Martín Urieta	3:24
7.	"Corrido de Manuel Juárez"	Joan Sebastian	4:37
8.	"El Corrido de Monterrey"	Severiano Briseño	3:20
9.	"El Siete de Copas"	José Luis De La Cruz, Ricardo Garibay	3:29
10.	"Maquina 501"	Fernando Charro Avitia	3:01

== Chart performance ==
Chart (2005)	Peak position
US Billboard Top Latin Albums	37
US Billboard Regional Mexican Albums	14

== Sales and certifications ==
Region	Certification	Certified units/sales
Mexico (AMPROFON)	Gold	50,000^{^}
^{^} Shipments figures based on certification alone.
