= Caloncho =

Mexican musician and singer

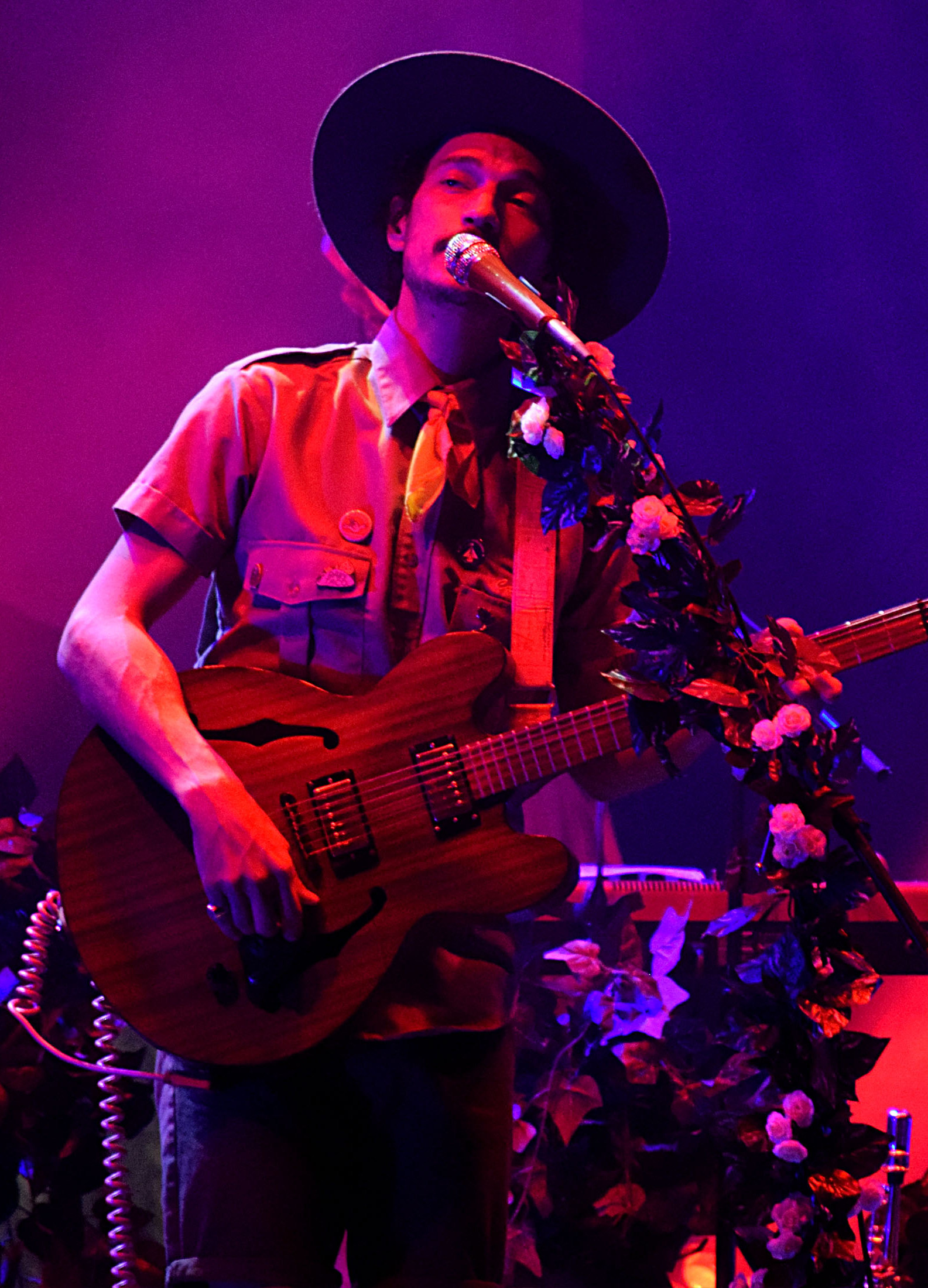
- Caloncho performing in 2019

Background information
- Also known as: Caloncho
- Born: Óscar Alfonso Castro; December 20, 1986 (age 39); Ciudad Obregón, Sonora, Mexico
- Genres: indie pop, reggae
- Occupation: Cantante
- Label: Universal Music México
- Website: http://www.caloncho.mx

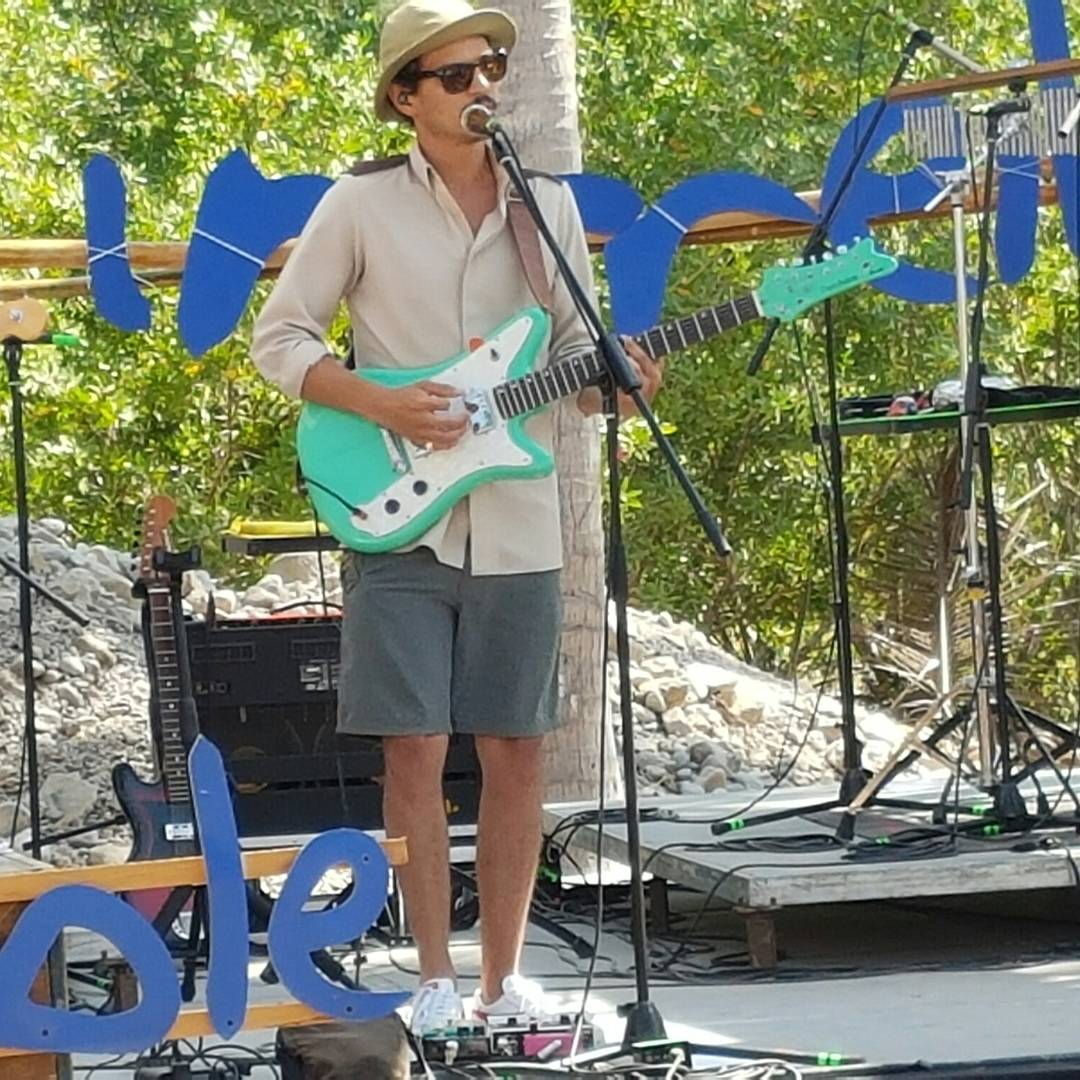

Óscar Alfonso Castro (born December 20, 1986), better known as Caloncho, is a Mexican musician and singer.

== Biography ==
As a child, Caloncho lived in Guadalajara where his favorite activity was playing the drums, until he later decided to experiment with melody. At the same time, he started playing the guitar that his grandfather had left for him years before, and soon learned to play songs from artists such as Bob Marley and Sublime.

Based on his own confession, Caloncho was the name his grandfather and step-sister, Angélica, used to call him when he was very little and since the name never annoyed him, he decided to use it as his musical stage name.

He began recording music independently with his first demo, Homeotermo, in 2011. He later collaborated with Mexican musician Siddhartha, who became his producer and helped develop his musical style. In 2013, he released the extended play (EP) Fruta, which incorporated elements of reggae, folk music and pop music. The release helped establish his presence in Mexico's independent music scene.

== Artistry ==
His first EP "Homeotermo" was recorded in 2011, and soon after, he started working with musician Siddhartha (a former-teacher and friend). He asked him to be his producer and Siddhartha agreed, saying about him: "Caloncho is a newly born musician, he is being newly discovered, both by himself and by those around him. He sent me a sample of his music and I immediately felt it was a musical obligation to help extract the sweet juice from his fruitful melodies." (Caloncho's website).

Caloncho then released his second EP, titled "Fruta" (Fruit), in September 2013. This production mixes his unique musical style with rhythms and stories of Mexican national folk, beaches, and forest rhythms, as well as urban sounds. All these sounds are used to retell different situations from his own life.

"We experimented a lot during the creation of the EP. We used organic sounds and objects that are not considered musical instruments, such as water, fruit, seeds, lighters, etc. I love it and I want to hear it", he said.

Caloncho has admitted that thanks to music, he has been able to live his life through all his senses. Music has also allowed him to feel completely connected with his family. "My dad would write and play songs for us, and he would invite us to build on them, as a way to be in communion with each other," he's said.

In 2015 he published the LP, "Fruta Vol. II" (Fruit Vol. II), an album described by Vice as having "pure musical quality in the instrumental arrangements, accompanied by lyrics that arouse curiosity and admiration."

He was nominated for the Latin Grammy Award for Best Alternative Music Album.

== Discography ==
- 2011, Homeotermo
- 2013, Fruta
- 2015, Fruta Vol. II
- 2017, Bálsamo
- 2022, Buen Pez

== See also ==
List of Mexican singers
