= Lástima Que Sean Ajenas =

Studio album by Pepe Aguilar
- Released: September 17, 2013 (Mexico); October 8, 2013 (United States)
- Studio: Studio Los Angeles
- Genre: Mariachi
- Length: 32:16
- Language: Spanish
- Label: Equinoccio; Sony

Pepe Aguilar chronology
Más de un Camino (2012)	Lástima Que Sean Ajenas (2013)	Pepe Aguilar MTV Unplugged (2014)

Singles from Lástima Que Sean Ajenas
- 1. "Lástima Que Seas Ajena" Released: August 5, 2013; 2. "Cuanto Te Debo" Released: February 3, 2014

Lástima Que Sean Ajenas (It's a Shame They're Not Mine) is the twenty-fifth studio album by Mexican-American singer-songwriter Pepe Aguilar by Equinoccio Records and distributed by Sony Music. It is a tribute album that consists of twelve cover versions of songs recorded by Mexican singer Vicente Fernández.

Lástima Que Sean Ajenas reached number four on the Billboard Top Latin Albums chart and number one on the Billboard Regional Mexican Albums chart in the United States. It was certified gold in Mexico. The album earned a Latin Grammy Award for Best Ranchero Album at the 15th Annual Latin Grammy Awards in 2014 and a Grammy nomination for Best Regional Mexican Music Album at the 57th Annual Grammy Awards in 2015.

== Background ==
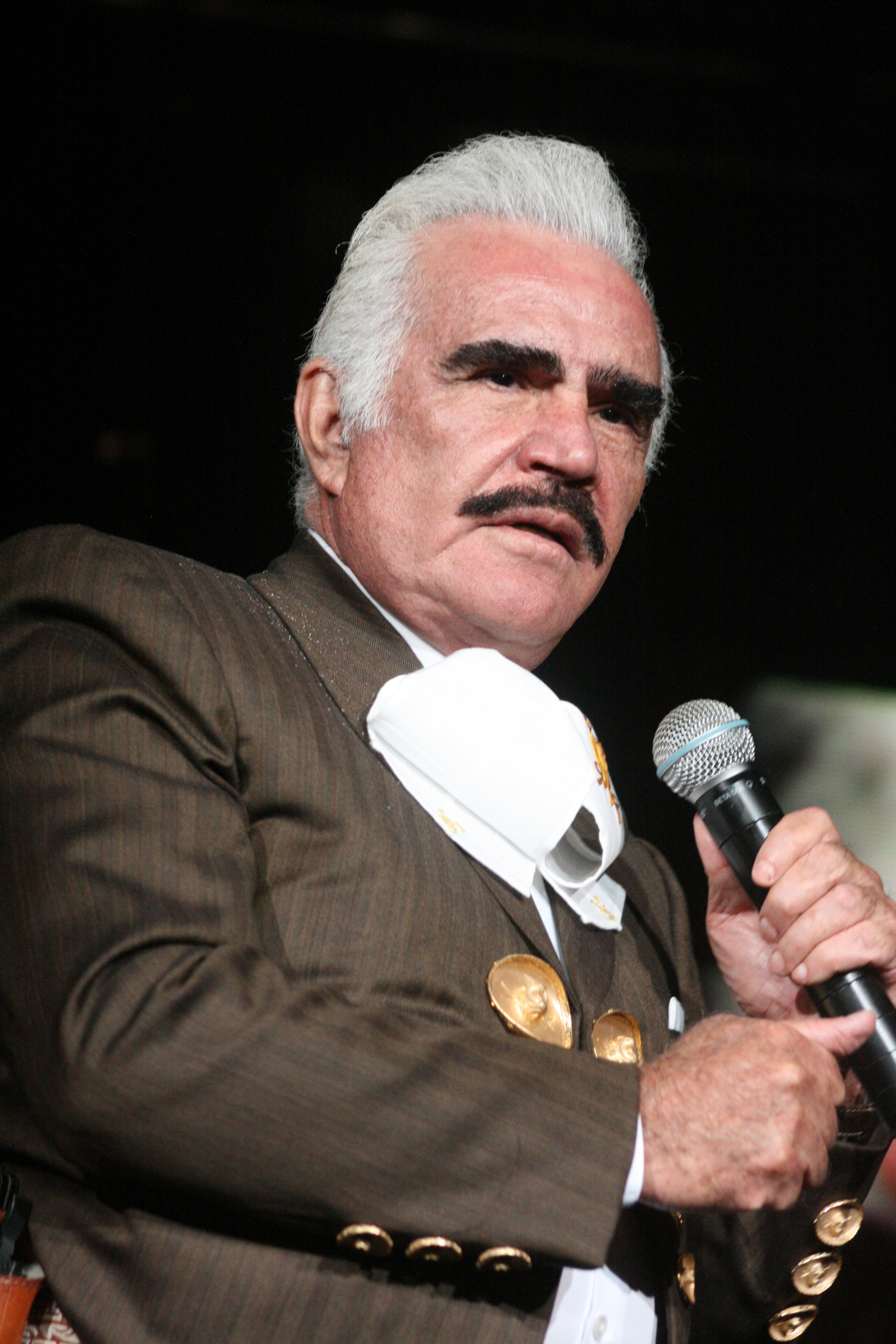
Lástima Que Sean Ajenas is a tribute album to Vicente Fernández (pictured 2011)

Both Pepe Aguilar and Vicente Fernández are two of Mexico’s top selling and well recognized acts of Mexican ranchera music. Fernández announced his retirement from music in February 2012. Pepe Aguilar told the Mexican newspaper, El Informador, that he had great admiration and respect for Fernández's work. He went on to say that when Fernandez announced his retirement, it gave him the idea of recording a tribute album in honor of Fernández's work. Aguilar went on to say that Fernández was a colleague of his father, Mexican singer and actor Antonio Aguilar, and he grew up listening to his music. In an interview with Univision, Aguilar stated that his father, Antonio Aguilar, Vicente Fernández, and Javier Solis were responsible for him choosing a career in music.

== Recordings ==
The first track, "El Tapatío", was recorded by Fernández on his 1994 album of the same name. The second song, "Lástima Que Seas Ajena", was recorded on his 1993 album of the same title. The third recording, "Acá Entre Nos", was recorded on his 1992 album, Qué de Raro Tiene. The fourth song, "Cuanto Te Debo", was recorded on his 1991 album, Palabra de Rey. The fifth track, "Qué Bonita" and "Dolor", was recorded on his 1982 album, ...Es La Diferencia. The sixth track, "Por Tu Maldito Amor", was recorded on his 1989 album of the same name. The eighth recording, "Hermoso Cariño", appears on his 1992 self titled album. The ninth song, "De Que Manera Te Olvido", was recorded on his 1998 album of the same name. The tenth and final song, "La Ley del Monte", was recorded on his 1987 album, Tesoros Musicales de Mexico.

== Reception ==
Lástima Que Sean Ajenas received a Latin Grammy Award for Best Ranchero Album at the 15th Annual Latin Grammy Awards in 2014 and a Grammy nomination for Best Regional Mexican Music Album at the 57th Annual Grammy Awards in 2015. Aguilar competed against Fernandez’s 2014 release of Mano a Mano Tangos a La Manera de Vicente Fernández in both categories, with Aguilar winning the Latin Grammy and Fernández receiving the Grammy.

Aguilar dedicated the Latin Grammy Award to Fernández and said it was an honor to be able to sing his songs. Fernández’s son, Mexican singer Alejandro Fernández criticized Aguilar for the recording saying that no one could ever replace his father. Aguilar responded by stating that it was not his intention to try to replace anyone and no one would be able to do so.

== Commercial release ==
Lástima Que Sean Ajenas reached number four on the Billboard Top Latin Albums chart and number one on the Billboard Regional Mexican Albums chart in the United States. It was certified gold by the Asociación Mexicana de Productores de Fonogramas y Videogramas in Mexico.

== Track listing ==
No.	Title	Writer(s)	Length
1.	"El Tapatío"	Brigido Ramírez Medina	3:07
2.	"Lástima Que Seas Ajena"	Jorge Macías Gómez	4:24
3.	"Acá Entre Nos"	Martín Urieta	3:17
4.	"Cuanto Te Debo"	Roberto Cantoral García and Dino Ramos	2:47
5.	"Qué Bonita, Qué Bonita"	Manuel Flores Monterrosas	3:00
6.	"Por Tu Maldito Amor"	Federico Mendez Tejeda	3:58
7.	"Dolor"	Chucho Monge	3:12
8.	"Hermoso Cariño"	Fernando Z. Maldonado	2:42
9.	"De Que Manera Te Olvido"	Federico Mendez Tejeda	2:57
10.	"La Ley del Monte"	José Ángel Espinoza Aragón	2:53
Total length:			32:16

== Charts ==
Chart (2013)	Peak position
US Top Latin Albums (Billboard)	4
US Regional Mexican Albums (Billboard)	1

== Certifications ==
Region	Certification	Certified units/sales
Mexico (AMPROFON)	Gold	30,000^{^}
^{^} Shipments figures based on certification alone.

== See also ==
- 2013 in Latin music
