= Paco Malgesto =

Mexican presenter

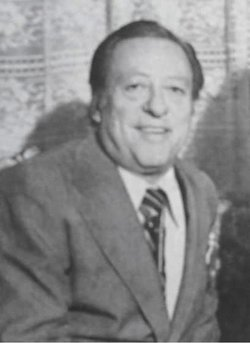
Paco Malgesto

Francisco Rubiales Calvo (22 February 1914 – 22 June 1978), known by his stage name Paco Malgesto, was a Mexican announcer and presenter. He is considered a pioneer of Mexican television.

== Marriages and children ==
He was first married to Guillermina Peñaloza, the mother of his eldest child: actress Cristina Rubiales. His second wife was singer and actress Flor Silvestre, the mother of his younger children: translator Francisco Rubiales and singer and actress Marcela Rubiales.
