= Esmeralda (singer) =

- Also known as: Alma Graciela Haro Cabello; La Versátil
- Born: María Graciela Herrejón Cabello; 18 February 1927; Morelia, Michoacán, Mexico
- Died: 25 August 1992 (aged 65) Mexico City, Mexico
- Genres: Cuplé; schottische; foxtrot; tango; bolero
- Occupations: Singer, actress
- Instrument: Vocals
- Years active: 1942–1992
- Labels: Peerless; Columbia; Musart; Rex

Alma Graciela Haro Cabello (born María Graciela Herrejón Cabello; 18 February 1927 – 25 August 1992), known professionally as Esmeralda, was a Mexican singer and actress. She was nicknamed La Versátil ("The Versatile") because she sang and recorded songs of various music genres, including cuplé, bolero, and tango.

== Biography ==
She was born María Graciela Herrejón Cabello in Morelia, Michoacán, to Ignacio Herrejón Ortiz and Amanda Cabello Morante. She later changed her name from Herrejón to Haro, her stepfather's surname.

In 1942, María Graciela participated in a contest organized by radio station XEW to choose a new vocalist for the songs of Agustín Lara, but she lost to Lupita Alday. In 1944, she recorded her first single for Peerless Records with the songs "Qué buscan en la mujer" and "Puerto nuevo", and two years later she made her debut at radio station XEW.

In 1948, Esmeralda introduced Agustín Lara's famous schottische "Madrid" on Mexican radio, and in that same year she recorded it for the Peerless label. Lara later commissioned the singer Ana María González to introduce the schottische in Spain.

In the late 1940s, Esmeralda appeared in Mexican cinema. She sang in the film Coqueta (1949) and played the role of an attractive singer named Risaralda who sings the bolero "Flor de azalea" in Dos pesos dejada (1949), starring Joaquín Pardavé and Sara García. She also participated in the film Curvas peligrosas (1950).

She married Juan Sánchez Azcona and had four children.

In the 1950s, Esmeralda signed a recording contract with Musart Records. For this label she made several recordings, including soundtrack albums of the Sara Montiel films El último cuplé (1957) and La violetera (1958); the album Música de papá y mamá (1958), with songs from revues; and the album Canciones de siempre (1959), with medleys of boleros by Mexican songwriters.

In the 1960s, she signed a contract to record albums with the Mexican label Rex, where she rerecorded songs she had recorded on the Peerless and Musart labels.

Mexico's Consejo Nacional de Turismo appointed her ambassador of Mexican music and sent her abroad to represent the culture of Mexico in European countries such as Spain, France, Italy, Poland, Czechoslovakia, and Russia. She also visited many Latin American countries in her tours.

== Discography ==
- Mi querido capitán (Peerless, 1953)
- La música de la película El último cuplé en la voz de Esmeralda (Musart, 1957)
- La música de la película La violetera en la voz de Esmeralda (Musart, 1958)
- Música de papá y mamá (Musart, 1958)
- Canciones de siempre (Musart, 1959)
- Rendez-vous con Esmeralda (Musart, 1960)
- Qué tiempos aquellos... (Musart, 1964)

== Filmography ==
- Coqueta (1949)
- Dos pesos dejada (1949)
- Curvas peligrosas (1950)
