= Selma Oxor =

Mexican singer-songwriter (born 1988)

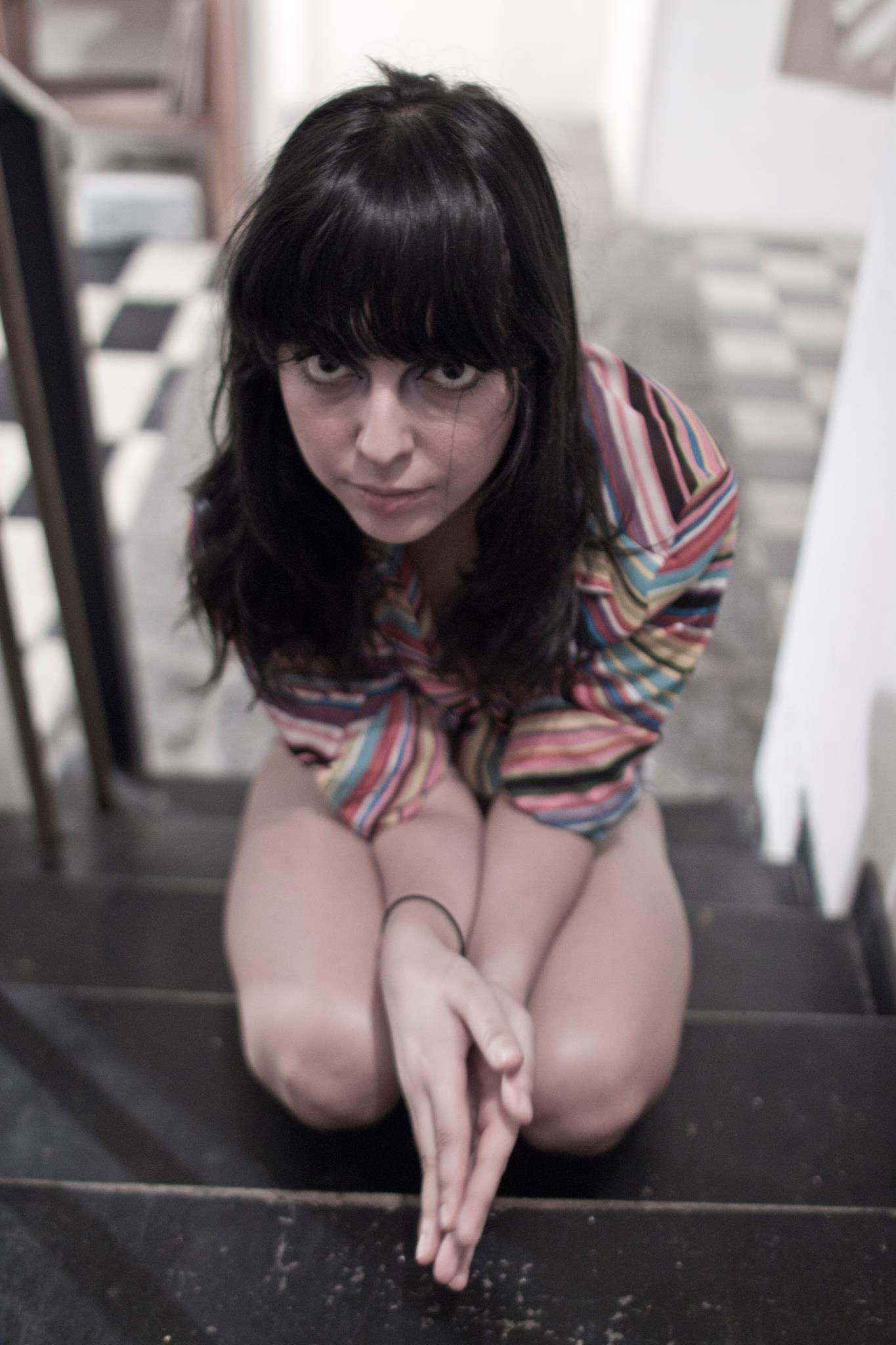
- Photo by Andrea Noel

Background information
- Born: June 9, 1988 (age 37); Monterrey, Mexico
- Genres: Electroclash, electropunk
- Occupation: Singer-songwriter
- Instrument(s): Guitar, Keyboard, Voice
- Years active: 2007 – present
- Labels: Vale Vergas, Nene Records, Hermitage Tapes
- Website: www.selmaoxor.com

Selma Oxor (born June 9, 1988) is a Mexican singer-songwriter.

Oxor was born Leticia Beeton in Monterrey, Mexico, but has since adopted the handle Selma Oxor. Selma Oxor was formed in 2007 with Alexico and Violeta Hinojosa (Ratas Del Vaticano). They released their self-titled album as a group in 2009 through Nene Records. By 2012 the trio separated to focus on other projects and that is when Oxor became a solo project. She has been called "Mexico’s New Queen of Electro Trash Goth" by Remezcla Musica, comparing the former member of Bam Bam to Grimes or Dani Shivers.

In 2009 she played at South by Southwest in Austin, Texas. She has spent several years playing shows internationally at underground venues, such as the warehouse space Death by Audio in Williamsburg, New York, Siberia in New Orleans and more obscure spots throughout Mexico.

In 2010, while living in Detroit, she collaborated on the recording of a noise album on the label Hermitage Records; Chronos and Hecate, for which she contributed synths. In 2012 she performed in Mexico City at the Converse Festival. and at the Taladro Fest in Matamoros, Tamaulipas and at Celebrate Mexico Now in New York City.

In both 2012 and 2013 she returned to her homecity of Monterrey, Mexico to play at NRMAL Festival, which is held annually in the state of Nuevo Leon.

In 2012 she joined the Mexico City based label Vale Vergas Discos and released her first solo album User 69 to rave reviews. Club Fonograma called it "filthy, dark, strenuous synth punk that persuades you to get carnal in each pumping, lecherous beat enveloping it".

MTV Iggy called her music "deliciously dark and vampish" and noted the change in aesthetic, adding "Leticia’s dark and sultry moans of not giving a fuck opened the pathway to more fans, as she paraded herself as the trick you won’t ever forget."

Her work has been reviewed by national and international blogs like Club Fonograma, MTV IGGY, NRMAL, Puerto Rico Indie, NEGATIVE YOUTH, Remezcla, Life box Set, After Pop TV, Noise Lab, Sicario TV, among others.

Her most recent work has been in collaboration with AJ Dávila of Dávila 666, on his new solo album Terror/Amor.
