= Dalia Inés =

Mexican singer, dancer, actress and writer

- Born: Dalia Inés Nieto Jiménez; 27 February 1946 (age 80); Santa Fe, Argentina
- Other names: Dalia Inés Nieto
- Occupations: Singer, dancer, actress, writer
- Years active: 1984–present
- Known for: Mi México
- Spouse: Roberto Romero de la Torre
- Children: 2
- Parents: Andrés Nieto (father); Flor Silvestre (mother)
- Relatives: Antonio Aguilar (stepfather); Francisco Rubiales (half-brother); Marcela Rubiales (half-sister); Antonio Aguilar, hijo (half-brother); Pepe Aguilar (half-brother); La Prieta Linda (aunt); Mary Jiménez (aunt)

Dalia Inés Nieto Jiménez (born 27 February 1948), known simply as Dalia Inés, is a Mexican singer, dancer, actress, and writer. The eldest of the five children of singer and actress Flor Silvestre, she is known for creating and performing in Mi México, a revue featuring Mexican folk music and dances.

== Life and career ==
Dalia Inés was born in Santa Fe, Argentina, to singer Flor Silvestre and her first husband, Andrés Nieto. Her mother was 17 years old at the time. She was raised by her stepfather Antonio Aguilar.

She first worked as a teacher and later as a translator. She made her singing debut in 1984, when she released her first album, Dalia Inés. She has been singing and dancing for several years in her musical revue Mi México, which features traditional music and dances from various states of Mexico. She appeared in several films, including some of her stepfather Antonio Aguilar's productions.

In 1992, she explained her love of Mexican music, which she inherited from her mother: "With so much music at home, I never had the desire to pursue another career other than this. I identify myself with our culture because my mother instilled it in me since I was a child".

In 2008, she released her third album, Alegría y sentimiento.

== Discography ==
- Dalia Inés (1984)
- Alegría y sentimiento (2008)

== Filmography ==
- Mi aventura en Puerto Rico (1977)
- Noche de carnaval (1984)
- ¡Ora es cuando chile verde! (1986)
- El chivo (1992)

== Book ==
- Lecumberri, el lado blanco del Palacio Negro (2014)
