= Juan Cirerol =

Mexican singer-songwriter

- Born: 8 June 1987 (age 38); Mexicali, Mexico
- Genres: Folk
- Occupations: Singer-songwriter
- Instrument: Guitar
- Years active: 2006 – present
- Labels: Vale Vergas
- Website: www.juancirerol.net

Juan Cirerol (born 8 June 1987) is a Mexican singer-songwriter.

Cirerol was born in Mexicali, Mexico. He studied classical guitar since he was 13 at the Autonomous University of Baja California.

He started off early in several punk bands. Having spent his youth writing, Cirerol has at this point composed over 200 songs.

In 2008, he started playing in the north of Mexico (Hermosillo, Tijuana, Mexicali) and recorded his debut studio album, No mas sirvo pa' cantar.

In 2008, he recorded and released his second studio album, Ofrenda al Mictlan, while in Mexico City with the help of visual artist Txema Novelo, under the independent record label Vale Vergas Discos.

His song "Corrido Chicalor" was named in September 2011 by guardian.co.uk and the Music Alliance Pact, as one of the 35 best new tracks in the world.

This album, Ofrenda al Mictlan was very well received and the music critics at Club Fonograma rated it as the 11th best album of 2011.

Carlos Reyes has called Cirerol "a storyteller, a romantic, and a stylist of the popular song".

== Discography ==
=== Albums ===
Title	Details	
Title	Details	NL
No Mas Sirvo Pa' Cantar	1st studio album; Released: 2008; Label: Vale Vergas Discos	
Ofrenda al Mictlan	2nd studio album; Released: 2010; Label: Vale Vergas Discos	
Haciendo Leña	3rd studio album; Released: 2012; Label: Discos Intolerancia	
Cachanilla Y Flor De Azar	4th studio album; Released: 2014; Label: Ciresongs Records 2014	
Todo Fine	5th studio album; Released: 2015; Label: Universal Music	
