= Valentín de la Sierra =

Valentín de la Sierra is a corrido (Mexican ballad) commemorating the death of Valentín Ávila Ramírez, a Cristero rebel who was killed in 1926 by the Mexican Army. The song is attributed to Chimano Noriega and Elidio Pacheco. It has been recorded by a variety of artists, including Vicente Fernández and Ana Gabriel.

== Background ==
Valentín Ávila Ramírez was a cowboy in Huejuquilla El Alto, Jalisco in Mexico. He was the son of rancher Basilio Ávila and his wife Eugenia Ramírez. Ávila and his brother Andrés signed up to fight with the Maderistas during the Mexican Revolution. He married Manuela Ávalos in 1917 and they had two daughters. In 1926, Ávila joined the Cristero Rebellion under rancher Pedro Quintanar. He was captured by federal troops under General Eulogio Ortiz and executed by hanging from a cedar tree located in Valparaíso, Zacatecas.

After his death, he was mythologized in song by troubadour and local laborer Chimano Noriega. The song was later altered and arranged by musician Elidio Pacheco. The corrido has various versions; the original depicted Ávila revealing the names of his fellow rebels, but the lyrics were later changed to show that he had not betrayed his comrades.

== Legacy ==
The corrido became popular among soldiers in the Mexican Army which helped to spread it beyond the Sierra Madre Occidental. The corrido inspired the 1968 film of the same name starring Antonio Aguilar. Lola Beltrán performed the song in the film. Another adaptation, El Caudillo, (starring Luis Aguilar) was released the same year. During the 1970s Chicano Movement, "Valentín de la Sierra" was popular with activists and was often sung at protests. The song features prominently in the play "Guadalupe" performed by the Latino theater troupe El Teatro de la Esperanza. It was also used in the 1975 documentary film The Schools of Crystal City.
