= Valentín de la Sierra (film) =

- Directed by: René Cardona
- Written by: Ricardo Garibay
- Starring: Antonio Aguilar; Ofelia Montesco
- Cinematography: Agustín Jiménez
- Edited by: Alfredo Rosas Priego
- Music by: Antonio Díaz Conde
- Production company: Cinematográfica ABSA
- Release date: 12 September 1968
- Country: Mexico
- Language: Spanish

Valentín de la Sierra is a 1968 Mexican Western drama film directed by René Cardona and starring Antonio Aguilar y Ofelia Montesco, with the special participation of the actresses and singers Lola Beltrán y Enriqueta Jiménez «La Prieta Linda». The film is inspired by the corrido of the same name, a dramatization of the death of Cristero rebel Valentín Ávila Ramírez. The setting of the film was changed to the earlier Mexican Revolution.

== Cast ==
- Antonio Aguilar as Valentín Zamora
- Jorge Martínez de Hoyos as Valentín's Father
- Ofelia Montesco as Mariana Fuentes
- Jorge Russek as Coronel Aldape
- Juan Gallardo as Capitán
- Fanny Schiller as Brothel Madame
- Enrique Lucero as Alejo
- Alejandro Reyna «El Tío Plácido» as Revolutionary Companion
- José Carlos Ruiz as Revolutionary
- Amado Zumaya as Revolutionary
- Alfredo Gutiérrez as Revolutionary
- Enriqueta Jiménez «La Prieta Linda» as Brothel Singer
- Lola Beltrán as Chabela (Singer)

== Production ==
Valentín de la Sierra was filmed during the winter of 1967. Scenes were shot in Texcoco de Mora and Mexico City. Cinematographer Agustín Jiménez shot the film in Eastmancolor.
