= Mari Nobre =

Italian-American singer

- Born: Naples, Italy
- Genres: Latin; jazz
- Occupation: Singer

Mari Nobre is an Italian-American singer. She was nominated for a Grammy Award in the category Best Música Mexicana Album for the album La Madrina.
