= Grammy Award for Best Música Mexicana Album (including Tejano) =

Music award category

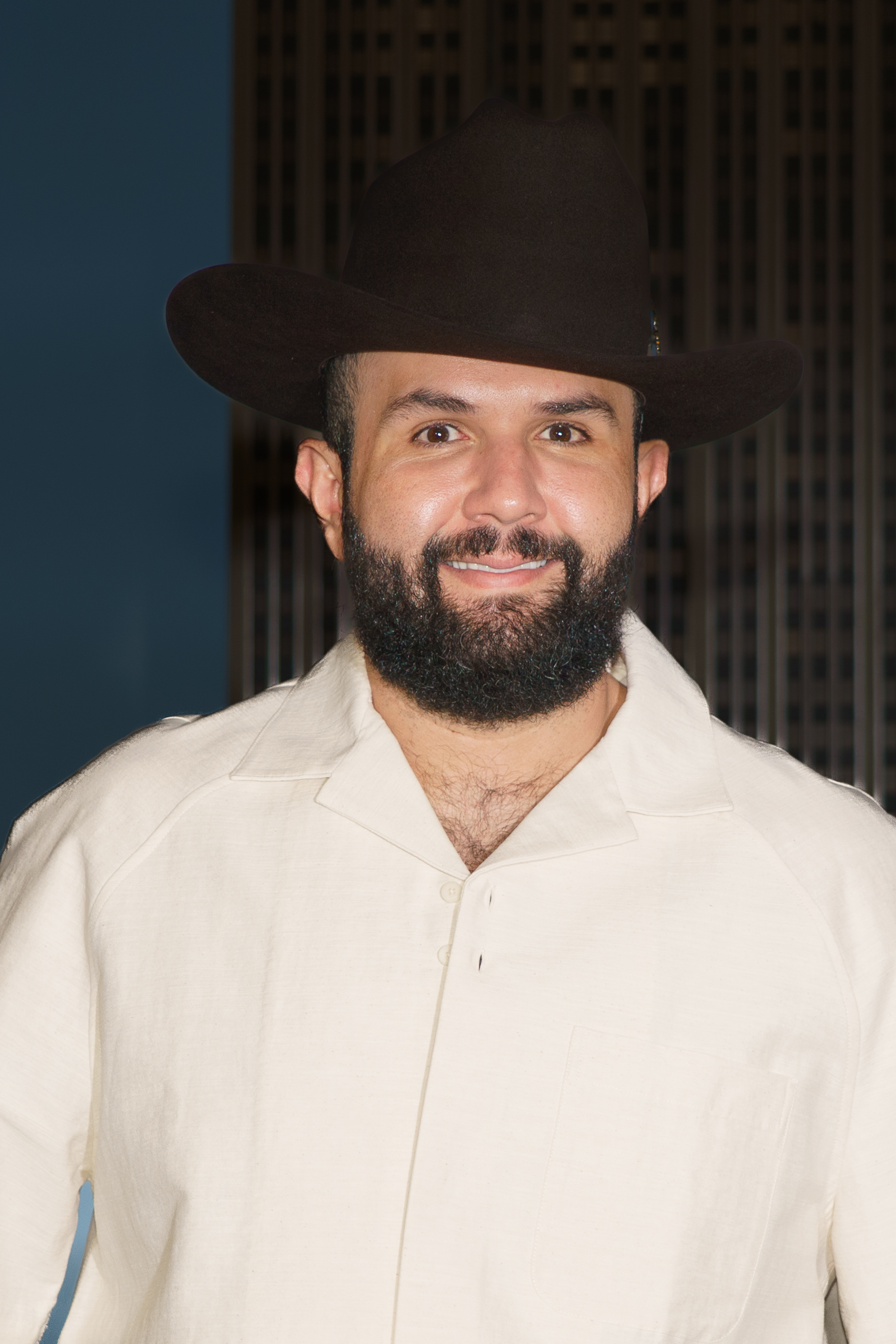
- Palabra de To's (Seca) by Carín León is the most recent recipient
- Awarded for: quality vocal or instrumental regional mexican or Tejano albums
- Country: United States
- Presented by: National Academy of Recording Arts and Sciences
- First award: 2012
- Currently held by: Carín León – Palabra de To's (Seca) (2026)
- Website: Grammy.com

The Grammy Award for Best Música Mexicana Album (including Tejano) is an award presented at the Grammy Awards, a ceremony that was established in 1958 and originally called the Gramophone Awards, to recording artists for releasing albums in the regional Mexican or Tejano genres. Honors in several categories are presented at the ceremony annually by the National Academy of Recording Arts and Sciences of the United States to "honor artistic achievement, technical proficiency and overall excellence in the recording industry, without regard to album sales or chart position".

In 2012, the award - then known as "Best Regional Mexican or Tejano Album" - was one of the new categories that resulted from the Recording Academy's wish to decrease the list of categories and awards for that year. According to the academy, "it was determined that musical distinctions among some of the regional Mexican subgenres were often very difficult to draw, so the restructuring in categories was warranted". This award combined the previous categories for Best Regional Mexican Album and Best Tejano Album. Other Latin categories were also either merged or discontinued.

Further restructuring took place in 2012 and was implemented in the 2013 Grammy Award season. As of 2013, this category was merged with the Best Banda or Norteño Album category which had been created in 2012. According to the academy, "Best Banda or Norteño Album and Best Regional Mexican or Tejano Album are now merged into one category: "Best Regional Mexican Music Album (including Tejano)", for albums containing at least 51 percent playing time of new vocal or instrumental regional Mexican (banda, norteño, corridos, gruperos, mariachi, ranchera, and Tejano) recordings." The category received its current name at the 66th Annual Grammy Awards following consultation with the Mexican music community and aims to recognize and acknowledge Mexican-influenced music produced in other countries.

As of 2024, Mexican singer Vicente Fernandez holds the record for the most wins in this category, with three, including one received posthumously at the 64th Grammy Award ceremony. Mariachi Divas de Cindy Shea holds the record for the most nominations, with six (one of which went on to be awarded with a Grammy). Mexican band Banda El Recodo is the most nominated act without a win, with three unsuccessful nominations.

== Recipients ==
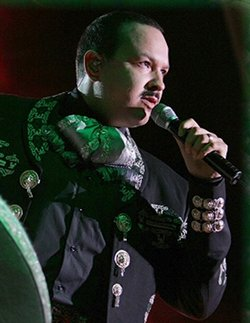
Pepe Aguilar was the first recipient of the award.

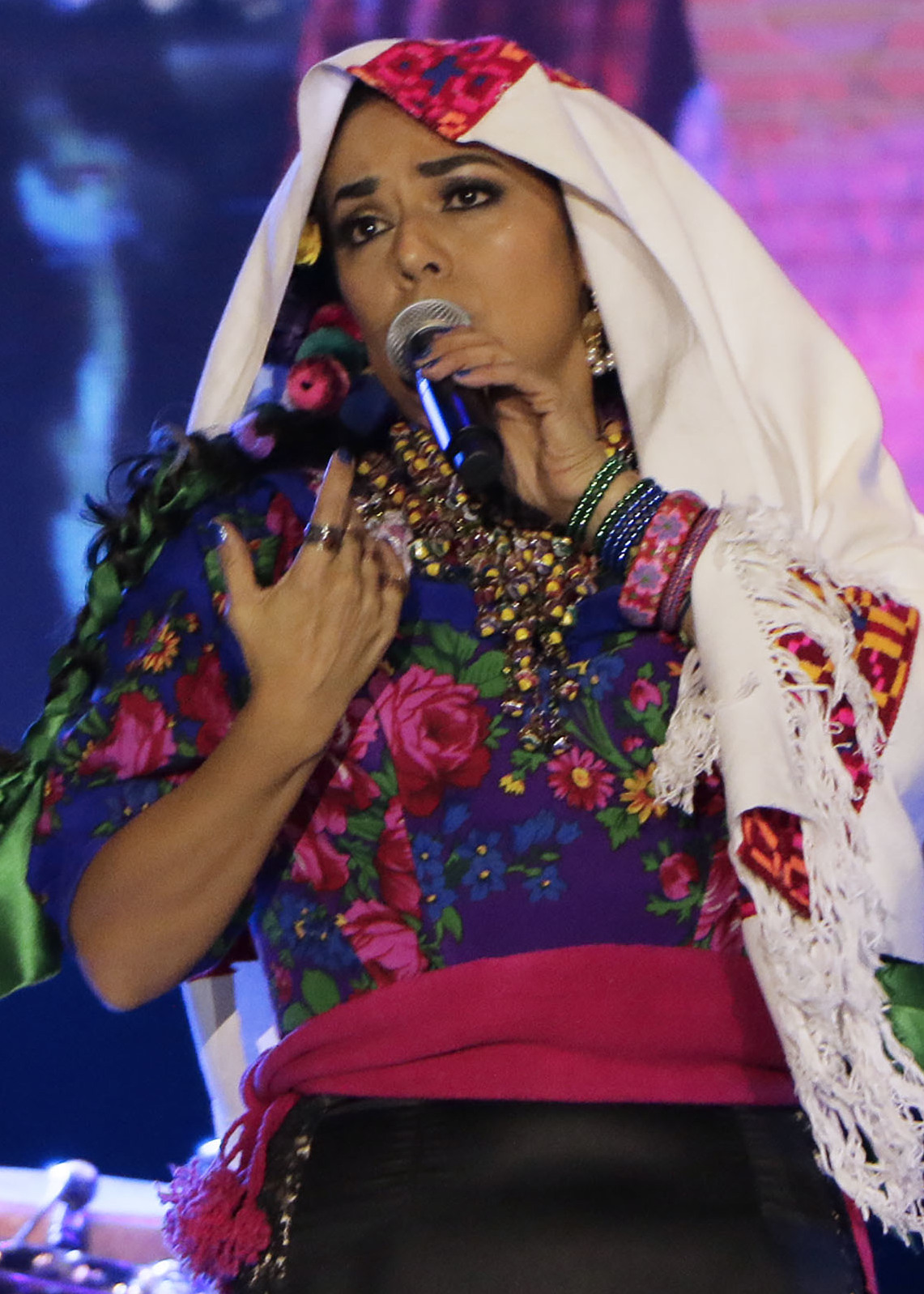
2013 winner Lila Downs.

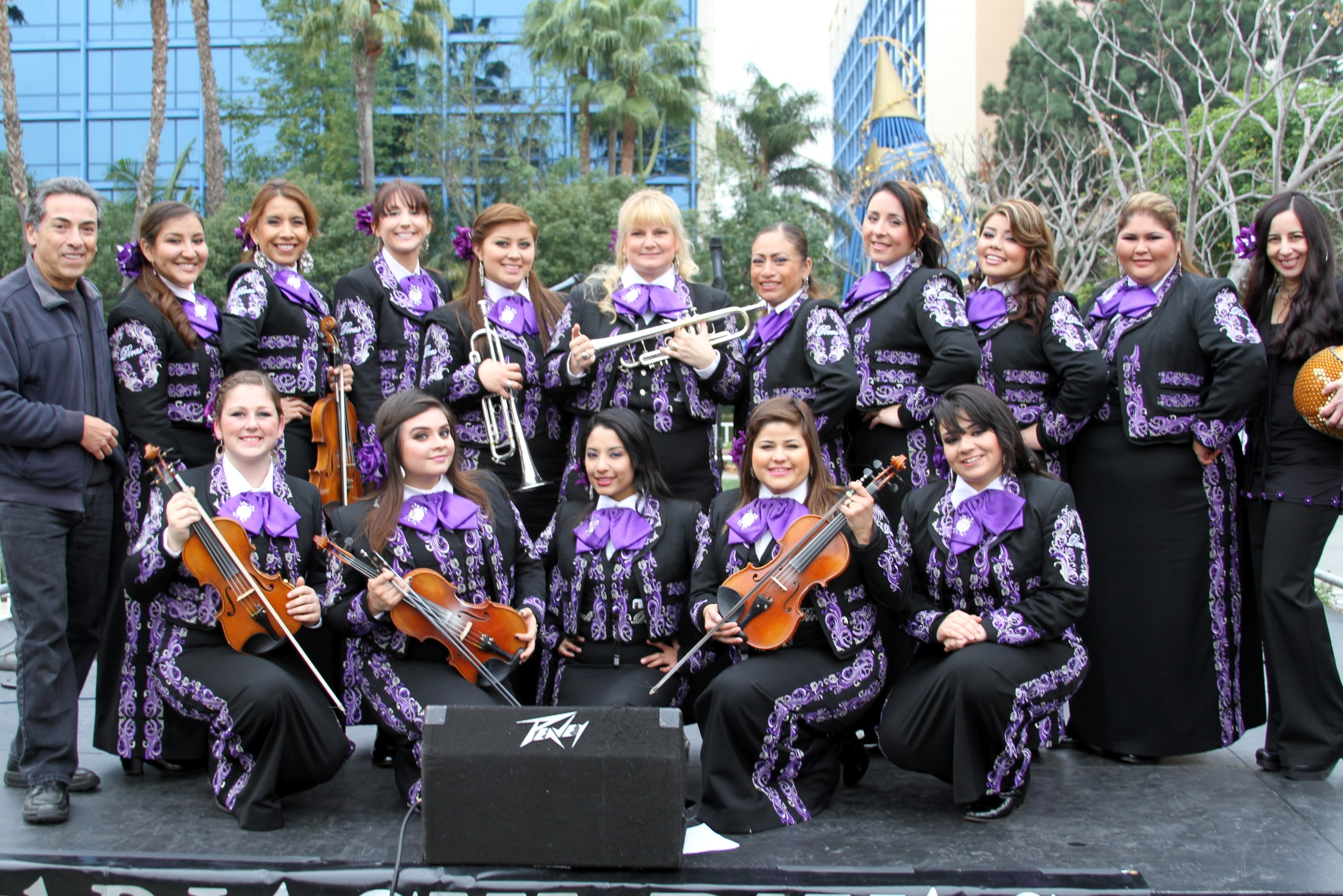
2014 winners Mariachi Divas de Cindy Shea.

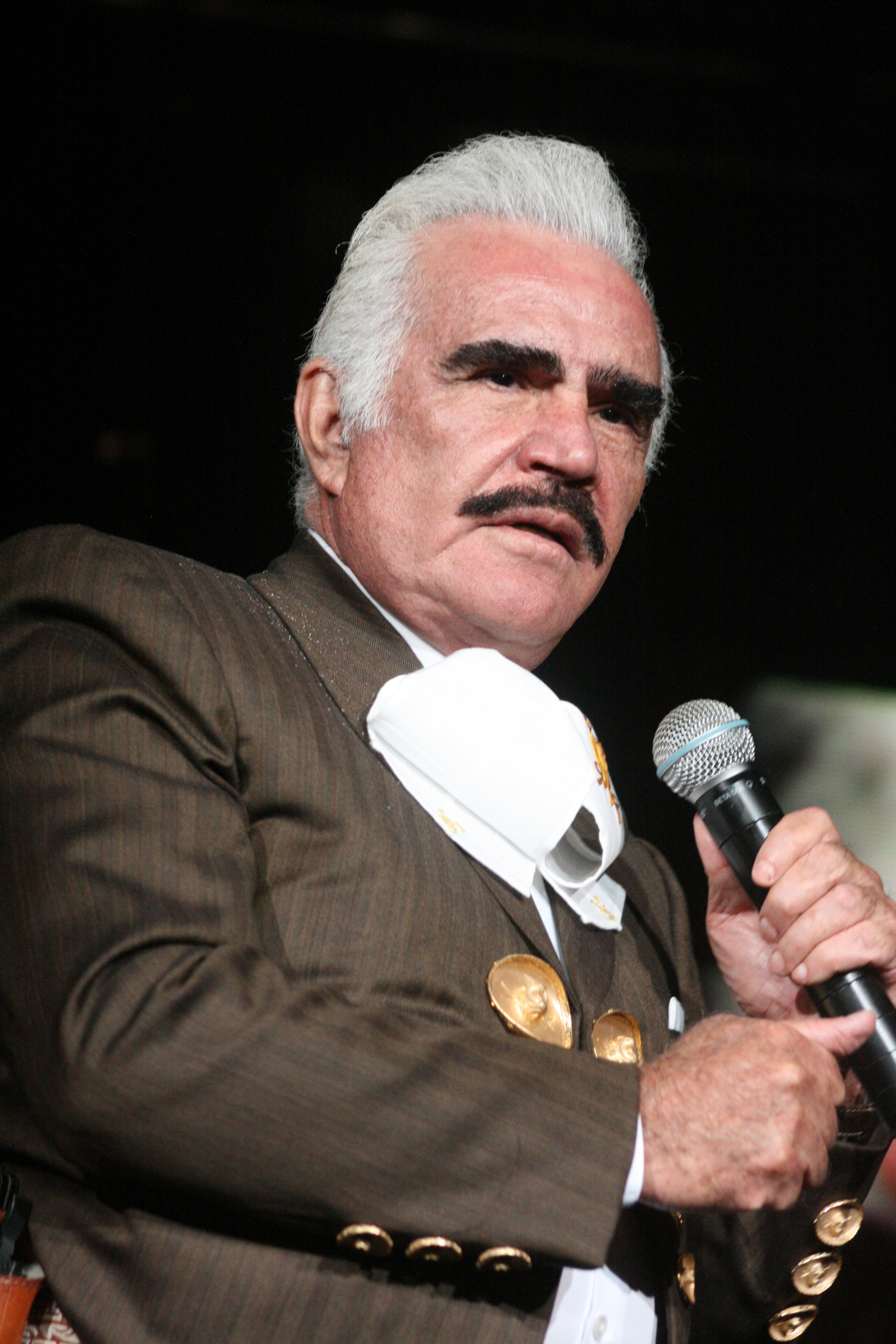
Three-time winner Vicente Fernández, including the last one in 2022 received posthumously.

=== 2010s ===
Year	Work	Artist
2012
2012	Bicentenario	Pepe Aguilar
2012	Amor a la Musica	Mariachi los Arrieros del Valle
2012	Eres Un Farsante	Paquita la del Barrio
2012	Huevos Rancheros	Joan Sebastian
2012	Orale	Mariachi Divas de Cindy Shea
2013
2013	Pecados y milagros	Lila Downs
2013	365 Días	Los Tucanes de Tijuana
2013	Oye	Mariachi Divas de Cindy Shea
2013	El Primer Ministro	Gerardo Ortíz
2013	Sembrando Flores	Los Cojolites
2014
2014	A Mi Manera	Mariachi Divas de Cindy Shea
2014	13 Celebrando el 13	Joan Sebastian
2014	El Free	Banda Los Recoditos
2014	En Peligro de Extinción	Intocable
2014	Romeo y Su Nieta	Paquita la del Barrio
2015
2015	Mano a Mano – Tangos a la Manera de Vicente Fernández	Vicente Fernández
2015	15 Anniversario	Mariachi Divas de Cindy Shea
2015	Alegria del Mariachi	Mariachi los Arrieros del Valle
2015	Lastima Que Sean Ajenas	Pepe Aguilar
2015	Voz y Guitarra	Ixya Herrera
2016
2016	Realidades (Deluxe Edition)	Los Tigres del Norte
2016	Mi Vicio Mas Grande	Banda el Recodo de Cruz Lizárraga
2016	Tradición, Arte y Passión	Mariachi los Camperos de Nati Cano
2016	Ya Dime Adiós	La Maquinaria Norteña
2016	Zapateando	Los Cojolites
2017
2017	Un Azteca en el Azteca, Vol. 1	Vicente Fernández
2017	Generación Maquinaria Est. 2006	La Maquinaria Norteña
2017	Hecho a Mano	Joss Favela
2017	Raíces	Banda el Recodo de Cruz Lizárraga
2017	Tributo a Joan Sebastian y Rigoberto Alfaro	Mariachi Divas de Cindy Shea
2018
2018	Arrieros Somos – Sesiones Acústicas	Aida Cuevas
2018	Ayer y Hoy	Banda el Recodo de Cruz Lizárraga
2018	Momentos	Alex Campos
2018	Ni Diablo Ni Santo	Julión Álvarez y su Norteño Banda
2018	Zapateando en el Norte	Various Artists
2019
2019	¡México Por Siempre!	Luis Miguel
2019	Cruzando Borders	Los Texmaniacs
2019	Leyendas de Mi Pueblo	Mariachi Sol de Mexico de José Hernández
2019	Mitad y Mitad	Calibre 50
2019	Primero Soy Mexicana	Ángela Aguilar
2019	Totalmente Juan Gabriel, Vol. II	Aida Cuevas

=== 2020s ===
Year	Work	Artist
2020
2020	De Ayer Para Siempre	Mariachi los Camperos
2020	20 Aniversario	Mariachi Divas de Cindy Shea
2020	Caminando	Joss Favela
2020	Percepción	Intocable
2020	Poco a Poco	La Energia Norteña
2021
2021	Un Canto por México, Vol. 1	Natalia Lafourcade
2021	AYAYAY!	Christian Nodal
2021	Bailando Sones y Huapangos con el Mariachi Sol de México de José Hernández	Mariachi Sol de Mexico de José Hernández
2021	Hecho en México	Alejandro Fernández
2021	La Serenata	Lupita Infante
2022
2022	A Mis 80's	Vicente Fernández
2022	Antología de la Música Ranchera Vol. 2	Aida Cuevas
2022	AYAYAY! (Super Deluxe)	Christian Nodal
2022	SEIS	Mon Laferte
2022	Un Canto por México, Vol. 2	Natalia Lafourcade
2023
2023	Un Canto por México — El Musical	Natalia Lafourcade
2023	Abeja Reina	Chiquis
2023	EP #1 Forajido	Christian Nodal
2023	Qué Ganas de Verte (Deluxe)	Marco Antonio Solis
2023	La Reunión (Deluxe)	Los Tigres del Norte
2024
2024	Génesis	Peso Pluma
2024	Amor Como en las Películas de Antes	Lupita Infante
2024	Bordado a Mano	Ana Bárbara
2024	Motherflower	Flor de Toloache
2024	La Sánchez	Lila Downs
2025
2025	Boca Chueca, Vol. 1	Carín León
2025	Diamantes	Chiquis
2025	Éxodo	Peso Pluma
2025	De Lejitos	Jessi Uribe
2026
2026	Palabra de To's (Seca)	Carín León
2026	Bobby Pulido & Friends una Tuya y una Mía — Por la Puerta Grande (En Vivo)	Bobby Pulido
2026	Mala Mía	Fuerza Regida and Grupo Frontera
2026	Sin Rodeos	Paola Jara
2026	Y Lo Que Viene	Grupo Frontera
2027
2027	Aunque Me Duela	Lupita Infante
2027	Dinastía (Deluxe)	Peso Pluma and Tito Double P
2027	La Madrina	Mari Nobre
2027	Lo Que Me Falta Por Llorar	Grupo Frontera
2027	¡Vida México!	Carlos Rivera

== See also ==
- Grammy Award for Best Banda or Norteño Album
- Grammy Award for Best Latin Pop, Rock or Urban Album
- Grammy Award for Best Tropical Latin Album
