= Pepe Aguilar =

Mexican singer (born 1968)

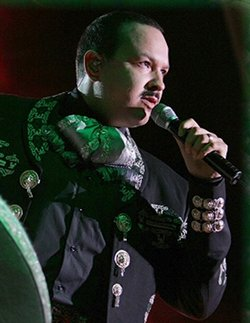
- Pepe Aguilar performing at the Chumash Casino Resort in Santa Ynez, California, on April 20, 2006.
- Born: José Antonio Aguilar Jiménez; 7 August 1968 (age 58); San Antonio, Texas, U.S.
- Citizenship: Mexico; United States
- Occupations: Singer; songwriter; record producer
- Years active: 1974–present
- Spouses: Carmen Trevino (m. 1991, divorced) Aneliz Álvarez Alcalá (m. 1997)
- Children: 4 (Emiliano Aguilar, Aneliz Aguilar, Leonardo Aguilar and Ángela Aguilar)
- Parents: Antonio Aguilar (father); Flor Silvestre (mother)
- Family: Antonio Aguilar, hijo (brother); Guadalupe Pineda (cousin); Majo Aguilar (niece)
- Musical career
- Origin: Zacatecas, Mexico
- Genres: Regional Mexican; Latin pop; Latin rock; Latin ballad
- Instruments: Vocals
- Website: pepeaguilar.com

José Antonio Aguilar Jiménez (born 7 August 1968), better known as Pepe Aguilar, is a Mexican singer. Born to famous singer-actors and musicians Antonio Aguilar and Flor Silvestre, he accompanied them on tour and played his first concert at the age of three, joining his father onstage at Madison Square Garden in New York City. He does the same with his own children, Leonardo Aguilar and Ángela Aguilar, who have also continued in the steps of their father and grandparents.

Aguilar has sold over 13 million albums worldwide. His work has earned him four Grammy Awards, five Latin Grammy Awards, nineteen Lo Nuestro Awards, and a star on the Hollywood Walk of Fame.

== Early life and career ==
Pepe Aguilar was born to Antonio Aguilar and Flor Silvestre in San Antonio, Texas, on 7 August 1968, while his parents were on tour. Although born in the United States, he was raised in Zacatecas, Mexico. Aguilar made his debut as a singer at the age of three, when his father Antonio had a concert at the Madison Square Garden in New York City. As a teenager, Aguilar was a rock music fan and had a band called "Equs". The band did not last long but that led him to make his first album. Aguilar's musical influences were Pink Floyd and The Who, among other rock bands. Nevertheless, while leaving his teenage years behind he turned to Mexican Regional music once again, mixing the traditional style with his modern pop influences and becoming a strong identity in the Latin scene in addition to developing a successful acting career.

=== 1989–1990 album releases ===
Aguilar began his career as a solo artist in 1989 with the launch of "Pepe Aguilar Con Tambora", and later released special editions. In 1992, Aguilar recorded his first mariachi album titled "Recuérdame Bonito", produced by Mexican singer-songwriter Joan Sebastian. He subsequently released "Que Bueno" and "Chiquilla Bonita" in 1993 and 1994.

After refusing to release an album due to legal disputes between Aguilar and his record label, in July 1998, he released "Por Mujeres Como Tú", which transformed him into a household name in Mexico and Latin America.

On February 9, 1999, the album "Por El Amor De Siempre" was released. This CD was composed of songs from the 1970s from singers like Camilo Sesto, José María Napoleón, Ricardo Cerato y José José, and others. Pepe took a new spin on these old songs, and it was met with success. This was the album that solidified his career.

By October 19, 1999, millions of copies had been sold. Many singles were played on the radio. It was the first Grammy on the category of "Mejor Álbum Regional Mexicano."

=== 2000–2006 album releases ===
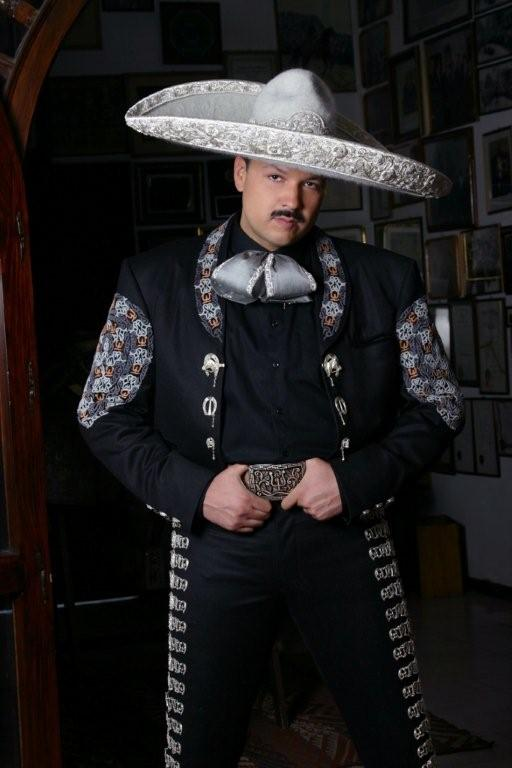
Pepe Aguilar in a Charro outfit

In the year 2000, he made a tribute to the great artists before him. Pepe did this CD as a thank to "las voces más representativas de la época de oro en el género ranchero," such as Jorge Negrete, Pedro Infante, Javier Solis, Miguel Aceves Mejía, and Vicente Fernandez.

It was the first CD to record "Lo Mejor De Nosotros," again with unedited songs and making teamwork with Fato. His song "Me Vas a Extrañar" occupies the first places in the territories where there was promotion.

On March 25, 2003, he produced "Y Tenerte Otra Vez," which became his first work with his own recording studio, "Equinoccio Records," and his licence with Univision includes songs like "Me Falta Valor," "Yo La Amo," and "A Pierna Suelta."

In 2003, he made a special tribute to his parents with "Con Orgullo Por Herencia." It recognized songs of his parents Antonio Aguilar and Flor Silvestre. In 2004, he produced the official song for Big Brother México, "Miedo," which became a big production of Pepe's, who had not sung an original song in 15 years.

"No Soy De Nadie," a CD, was published on August 31, 2004. "El Autobús" was a hit song from this CD. This CD included work from great songwriters like Juan Gabriel, Luís Demetrio, Jesús Monarrez, and it also included his own song writing.

In 2005, with the album "Historias De Mi Tierra," he made a tribute to El Corrido. Songs like "Dos Amigos," "El Federal De Caminos," and "El Corrido de Chihuahua" are included in this work. The CD gave Pepe another Latin Grammy for 'Mejor Álbum Ranchero' and gave him another American Grammy for 'Mejor Álbum Mexicano Americano'.

On August 15, 2006, the CD "Enamorado," the second part of "Por El Amor De Siempre" (1999) was released, and in it is the main song of the Novela "Destilando Amor," called "Por Amarte." The CD was given another Latin Grammy in the category of 'Mejor Álbum Ranchero' in 2007. In 2009, Pepe asked his fans to not buy his albums from the company Musart, as they were only copies and did not financially benefit him.

Aguilar received the 2,474th star on the Hollywood Walk of Fame on July 26, 2012, located at 7060 Hollywood Blvd., which was placed next to the star of his father.

== As a businessman ==
Like a businessman and artist who is independent, he has his own record label (Equinoccio Records) and studio with the highest

technology in Latin America. He has also gone to the movement of fashion. In 2009 he took out his own fashion line called "Pepe Aguilar Línea de Calzado," which debuted for men and women. To celebrate this and share yet another aspect of his life with his fans, he launched his "Pepe Aguilar Signature Collection" through WSS Warehouse Shoe Sale retailer in the United States. In addition, his dream of helping Mexico in some way has given way to an eco-friendly agricultural project in which Aguilar will strengthen and promote the organic production of crops in communities in Zacatecas, using traditional practices and technology that will have a positive impact on the environment.

== Personal life ==
Pepe Aguilar was born into a musical family. His father, Antonio Aguilar, was a regional Mexican singer who sold over 25 million records and is credited with being one of the pioneers in bringing charro and mariachi culture to international audiences. His mother, Flor Silvestre, was also a regional Mexican singer and was one of the leading ladies in what is considered the golden era of Mexican cinema. He is the nephew of singers La Prieta Linda and Mary Jiménez, his mother's younger sisters. He has one brother: Antonio Aguilar Jr., and three half siblings Dalia Inés, Francisco Rubiales, and Marcela Rubiales. He was married to Carmen Treviño, and had one son Emiliano Aguilar. After their divorce, he married Aneliz Álvarez Alcalá, who at one point was kidnapped along with his brother and held for ransom. He has four children, with Leonardo Aguilar and Ángela Aguilar also being singers.

== Discography ==
- Pepe Aguilar con Tambora (1990)
- Pepe Aguilar con Tambora (Cautiva y Triste) (1991)
- Pepe Aguilar con Tambora (14 Años, 9 Meses) (1992)
- Recuerdame Bonito (1992)
- Chiquilla Bonita (1993)
- Qué Bueno (1994)
- Por Mujeres Cómo Tú (1998)
- Por el Amor de Siempre (1998)
- Por Una Mujer Bonita (1999)
- Lo Grande de los Grandes (2000)
- Exitos con Tambora (2001)
- Lo Grande de los Grandes (2001)
- Lo Mejor de Nosotros (2001)
- Con Orgullo por Herencia (2002)
- Y Tenerte Otra Vez (2003)
- No Soy de Nadie (2004)
- Historias de Mi Tierra (2005)
- Enamorado (2006)
- Puros Boleros (2006)
- Pepe Aguilar Live (2007)
- Enamorado (Fan Edition) (2007)
- 100% Mexicano (2007)
- 100% Mexicano Edición Mariachi (2007)
- Homenaje (2008)
- Bicentenario (2010)
- Negociaré con la Pena EP (2011)
- Más de Un Camino EP (2012)
- Lástima Que Sean Ajenas (2013)
- No Lo Había Dicho (2016)
- Fue un Placer Conocerte (2018)
- SE7ENTAS (2020)
- Mexicano Hasta los Huesos (2021)
- A la Medida (2022)
- Que Llueva Tequila (2024)
- Mi Suerte es Ser Mexicano (2025)
- Mi Suerte es Ser Mexicano II (2026)

== Awards and nominations ==
Grammy Awards

Year	Nominee / work	Award	Result	Ref.
2000	Por Una Mujer Bonita	Best Mexican/Mexican-American Album	Won	
2006	Historias de Mi Tierra	Best Mexican/Mexican-American Album	Won	
2007	100% Mexicano	Best Mexican/Mexican-American Album	Won	
2011	Bicentenario	Best Regional Mexican Music Album (including Tejano)	Won	
2015	Lastima Que Sean Ajenas	Best Regional Mexican Music Album (including Tejano)	Nominated	

Latin Grammy Awards

Year	Nominee / work	Award	Result	Ref.
2006	Historias de Mi Tierra	Best Ranchero Album	Won	
2007	Enamorado	Best Ranchero Album	Won	
2012	Más De Un Camino	Best Ranchero Album	Won	
2014	Lastima Que Sean Ajenas	Best Ranchero Album	Won	
2016	"Cuestión de Esperar"	Record of the Year	Nominated	

== See also ==
- List of best-selling Latin music artists
