= Antonio Aguilar, hijo =

Mexican singer and actor (born 1960)

Antonio Aguilar Jr.
- Born: José Jesús Antonio Aguilar Jiménez; 9 October 1960 (age 65); Mexico City, Mexico
- Occupations: Singer, actor
- Years active: 1972–present
- Children: Majo Aguilar; Susana Aguilar
- Parents: Antonio Aguilar (father); Flor Silvestre (mother)
- Relatives: Dalia Inés (half-sister); Francisco Rubiales (half-brother); Marcela Rubiales (half-sister); Pepe Aguilar (brother); Guadalupe Pineda (cousin)

José Jesús Antonio Aguilar Jiménez (born 9 October 1960), known as Antonio Aguilar, Hijo (Antonio Aguilar, Jr.) is a Mexican singer and actor. He is the eldest son of singers and actors Antonio Aguilar and Flor Silvestre.

He made his acting debut in his parents' film La yegua colorada in 1972. His debut studio album, Toda mi vida (1994), was produced and directed by his brother, Pepe Aguilar, and released by EMI Latin. "Por ti no voy a llorar", a track from the album, became his first hit single and peaked at number 20 on Billboard Hot Latin Tracks in July 1994.

His daughter Majo Aguilar is a singer and songwriter.

== Discography ==
- Toda mi vida (1994)
- Amor entre sombras (1995)
- La amargura del amor (1998)
- Caballo viejo (2004)
- Caballo viejo (2016)
