= Trump dance =

Dance inspired by Donald Trump

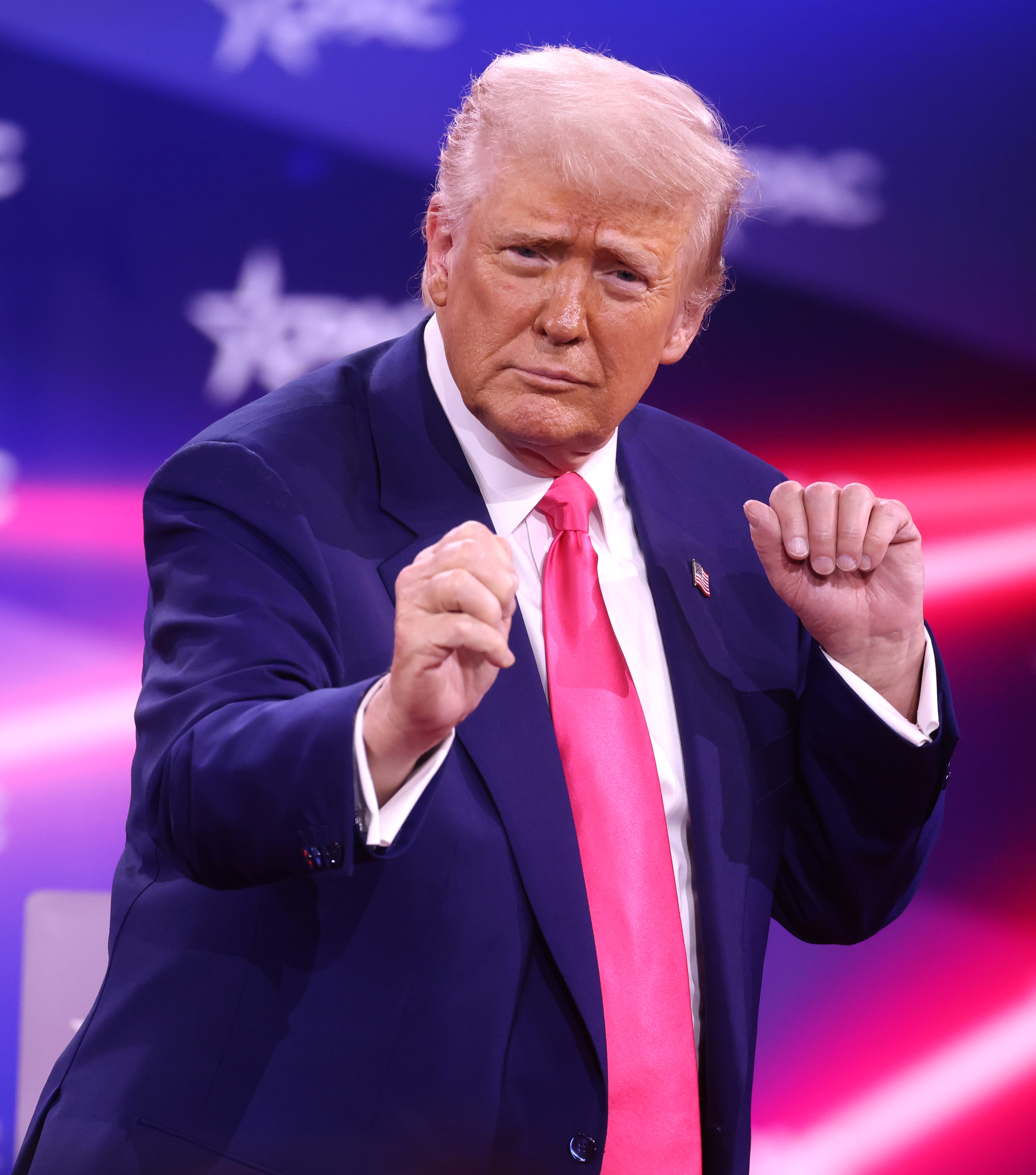
- Donald Trump performs the dance in 2025
- Genre: Rally performance
- Inventor: Donald Trump
- Year: c. 2020
- Origin: United States
- Related dances: Y.M.C.A. dance

Trump performing the dance at the US Navy 250th Celebration

The Trump dance is a dance inspired by 45th and 47th U.S. president Donald Trump's characteristic rally gestures while dancing to his campaign song "Y.M.C.A." by the Village People. The dance typically involves slowly punching the air while moving one's hips and knees without moving one's feet.

== Background ==
The dance originated at Trump's 2020 campaign rallies and gained more media attention at his 2024 campaign rallies, where his movements became a notable aspect of his public persona. Over time, these gestures were popularized through social media and eventually adopted by individuals outside the political sphere.

The dance is performed by rocking the hips in a side-to-side motion while performing alternating, subdued fist pumps. In October 2024, Trump began occasionally incorporating a pantomime golf swing into the dance. According to the Times of India, this sparked "a wave of reaction" on social media.

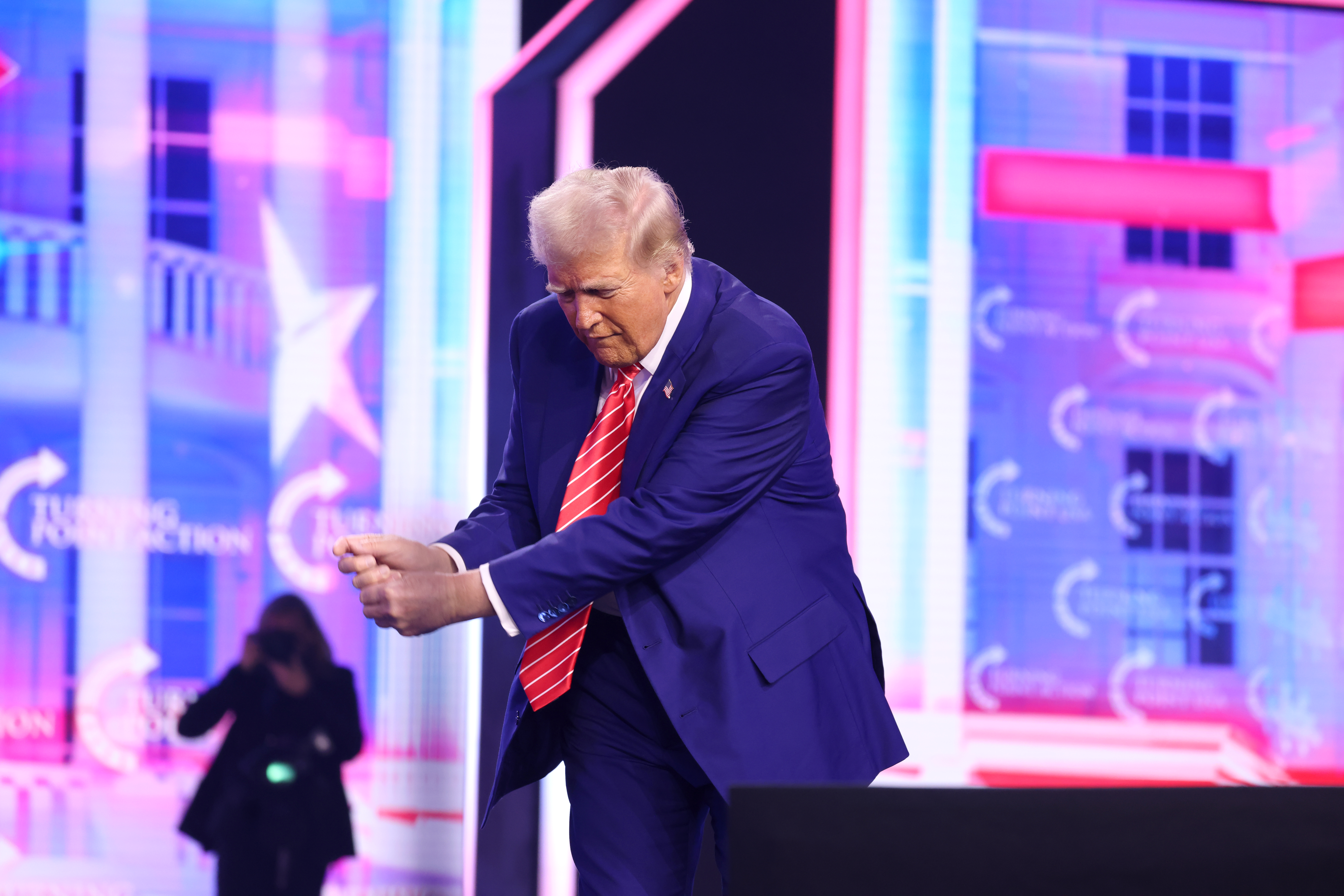
Trump's addition of the golf swing, taken at 2024 AmericaFest

The Trump dance is frequently performed to the musical accompaniment of the Village People's "Y.M.C.A.", which Trump has called the "gay national anthem".

Trump admits that first lady Melania Trump does not like the dance, saying “She hates when I dance… I said, ‘everybody wants me to dance’. ‘Darling, it’s not presidential’". Melania confirmed the conversation saying, "I like it but at certain times… Some days it’s not appropriate, and I told him so."

== Adoption in sports ==
The Trump dance is sometimes incorporated by athletes into their on-field celebratory routines.

=== National Football League (NFL) ===
NFL players, including Brock Bowers of the Las Vegas Raiders, Calvin Ridley of the Tennessee Titans, Nick Bosa of the San Francisco 49ers, Amon-Ra St. Brown of the Detroit Lions and Za'Darius Smith of the Detroit Lions, have been noted for performing the dance. Similar celebrations have also been documented among college football athletes. St. Brown later apologized, saying "I did not mean to offend anyone. It was just, we’re having fun."

In late November 2024, the NFL announced it would not penalize players who performed the Trump dance during league games. According to football analyst Jordan Schultz, the NFL indicated "that they only take action against those [play celebrations] deemed excessive or inappropriate" but that the league "is good" with the Trump dance.

=== Major League Baseball (MLB) ===
During a game that Trump attended on September 11, 2025 between the New York Yankees and Detroit Tigers, three Tigers players, Dillon Dingler, Wenceel Pérez, and Gleyber Torres did the dance following base hits.

=== Golf ===
Professional golfer Charley Hull performed the dance during a tournament match on November 17, 2024.

=== Soccer ===
U.S. national soccer team captain Christian Pulisic used the dance to celebrate his goal in a 2024–25 CONCACAF Nations League A match against Jamaica on November 18, 2024. Pulisic later stated, "It's not a political dance. It was just for fun." A few days prior, players of the English team Barnsley performed the dance after scoring a goal in a 2024–25 EFL League One game against Cambridge United.

Players of the Belgium national football team performed the dance in celebration of their 1-4 win against the U.S. national soccer team in the 2026 FIFA World Cup Round of 16, in retaliation of president Trump's successful attempt to overturn the one game suspension Folarin Balogun received because he had picked up a red card in the previous round.

=== Mixed martial arts ===
Ultimate Fighting Championship heavyweight champion Jon Jones incorporated the dance into his post-match celebrations during an event attended by Trump.

== Cultural significance ==
The Trump dance is widely regarded as an example of the intersection of sports and political culture, although athletes often characterize its use as non-political. Supporters of the dance argue it reflects Trump's broader cultural influence, while detractors view it as a polarizing gesture.

In the week prior to the 2024 U.S. presidential election, "Y.M.C.A.", to which the Trump dance is frequently performed, appeared in the Billboard Hot Dance/Electronic chart for the first time in 47 years, rising to the number four spot shortly after the election and, according to songwriter Victor Willis, grossing "several million dollars" since Trump's adoption of the tune. Karen Willis, the manager of the Village People, attributed the song's sudden resurgence to Trump's use of it during his performances of the Trump dance.

In a November 2024 New York Times column by Maureen Dowd, Dowd said she was going to solicit "younger members of the family" to teach her the dance. The same month, Javier Milei, the president of Argentina and a political ally of Trump, performed the Trump dance during a gala at Mar-a-Lago. Videos of Milei performing the dance "rippled across social media", according to The Daily Beast.
