= Peerless Records =

Record label in Mexico

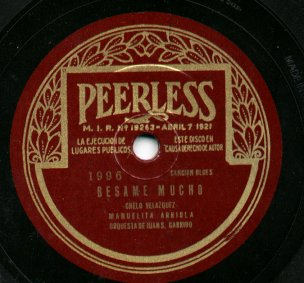
- Peerless Record Label
- Status: Defunct
- Country of origin: Mexico

Peerless Records was a record label based in Mexico.

Peerless was founded in 1921 in Mexico City by E. Baptista. Early pressings of their gramophone record were made under contract by Gennett Records. By 1933, Peerless was pressing its own records in Mexico. The Peerless label mostly released popular Mexican music; some popular dance bands and tunes from the United States of America also appeared on Peerless in the 1920s.

== Background ==
In addition to Mexico, Peerless Records were sold in other parts of Latin America and in some communities in the Southwest United States. The labels sometimes have text in both English and Spanish.

Peerless was considered a "major label" in Mexico during the 1940s and 1950s.

Peerless issued long-playing vinyl records starting in 1951. During the years, Peerless has been the record label for many well-known artists, such as Vianey Valdez, Pedro Infante, Lola Beltran, Los Apson, Los Baby's, Los Tecolines and David Záizar. It also secured Mexican distribution for some artists from beyond Mexico, such as Los Corraleros de Majagual, Celia Cruz, Tom Jones and The Rolling Stones. Peerless remained an independent label until 2001, when it merged with its subsidiary MCM (Metro Casa Musical), becoming Peerless-MCM S.A. de C.V., which was later bought by Warner Music Mexico.

Peerless Records would also have some Azteca Records recordings released in Mexico on its label.

== History ==
It was reported by The Cash Box in the magazine's 29 April 1961 issue that Peerless had announced new contracts with artists Jose Venegas and Betty Melendez, who were already recording for the label. Former Tizoc Records artist, Luis G. Roldan was also a new arrival at Peerless. At the time, Peerless artist Juan Mendoza was at no. 2 on the Mexico's Best Sellers chart with "Crei" and Lola Beltrán, also with Peerless was at no. 4 on the same chart with "El Caballo Blanco".

According to the 5 June 1965 issue of Cash Box, Vianey Valdez, La Prieta Linda, Ricard Jimenez would be leaving Peerless Records and signing on with other labels.

== See also ==
- Esmeralda (singer)
- List of record labels
