= Vale Vergas Discos =

Mexican record label

Vale Vergas Discos is a record label based in Mexico City.

It currently represents the artists Juan Cirerol and Hidrogenesse, and over a dozen others.
