= Leonardo Aguilar =

Mexican singer (born 1999)

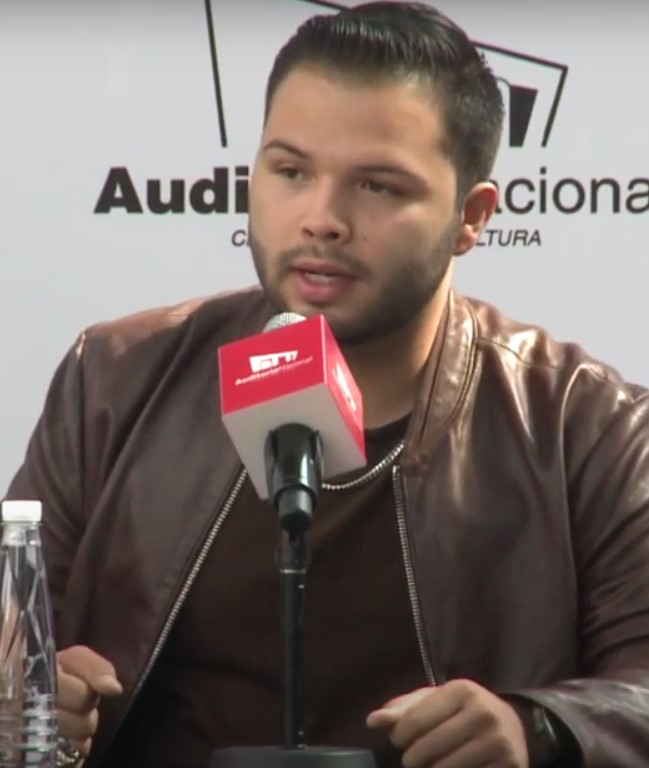
- Aguilar at a press conference in 2018.

Background information
- Born: Leonardo Antonio Aguilar Álvarez; August 15, 1999 (age 27); Mexico City, Mexico
- Genre: Regional Mexican
- Occupation: Singer
- Instruments: Vocals; guitar; piano
- Years active: 2012–present
- Labels: Machin; Equinoccio Records S.a de C.V.
- Website: leonardoaguilaroficial.com

Leonardo Antonio Aguilar Álvarez (born August 15, 1999) is a Mexican singer. As of 2017, Aguilar has been nominated for two Latin Grammy Awards.

== Early life ==
Leonardo Aguilar was born to Pepe Aguilar and Aneliz Álvarez Alcalá in Mexico City, Mexico on August 15, 1999.

Aguilar holds dual citizenship with Mexico and the United States, through his father, who was born in San Antonio, Texas. Aguilar was born into a musical family, known as "La Dinastía Aguilar" (The Aguilar Dynasty). Aguilar's father is Mexican singer Pepe Aguilar, his paternal grandparents are Mexican singer-actors Antonio Aguilar and Flor Silvestre. Since a young age, Aguilar has frequently accompanied his father on tour throughout Latin America with his younger sister, Ángela Aguilar, who also performs.

== Career ==
In 2012, at just twelve years old, Aguilar released Nueva Tradición, alongside his sister, Ángela Aguilar. It featured four songs by Leonardo and four by Ángela.

On December 2, 2016, Aguilar released his first solo album, Gallo Fino, produced by his father, Pepe. Aguilar worked with other prominent Mexican artists such as Espinoza Paz and El Chapo de Sinaloa. Gallo Fino was nominated for Best Norteño Album at the 18th Annual Latin Grammy Awards in 2017. His song "Compromiso Descartado" was also nominated for Best Regional Mexican Song.

== Discography ==
- Nueva Tradición (2012)
- Gallo Fino (2016)
- Y lo Volví a Hacer (2023)
- Soy Como Quiero Ser (2024)

== See also ==
- Controversy with Emiliano Aguilar
