= Mary Jiménez =

- Birth name: María de la Luz Jiménez Chabolla
- Also known as: La Folklórica Sexy
- Born: Salamanca, Guanajuato, Mexico
- Genres: Ranchera
- Occupation: Singer
- Instrument: Vocals
- Labels: GAS; CBS

María de la Luz Jiménez Chabolla, known professionally as Mary Jiménez or Mari Jiménez, is a Mexican ranchera singer who was nicknamed La Folklórica Sexy ("The Sexy Folk Singer") because of her sensuous voice. She has recorded albums for well-known Mexican record labels, such as Discos GAS and Discos CBS.

== Life and career ==
Jiménez was born in Salamanca, Guanajuato, Mexico, to Jesús Jiménez Cervantes (1904-1971) and María de Jesús Chabolla Peña (1907-1993). She is the younger sister of singers Flor Silvestre and La Prieta Linda.

In 1979, she recorded an album, Quédate con él, for the Mexican record company Discos GAS (currently Discos Orfeón). "Quédate con él" and "Silencio corazón", two songs from this album, were also released on a 45 RPM single.

In 1983, she recorded an album, No recuerdas, bien mío, for Harmony Series (a CBS record label). This album was produced by the songwriter and artistic director María Guadalupe "Lupita" Ramos, with musical arrangements by Román Palomar and Raúl Fuentes.

== Discography ==
- Quédate con él (GAS, 1979)
- No recuerdas, bien mío (Harmony [CBS], 1983)
