= Marcela Rubiales =

Mexican singer, actress, and television presenter

- Born: Marcela Rubiales Jiménez; 16 April 1952 (age 74); Mexico City, Mexico
- Occupations: Singer, actress, television presenter
- Years active: 1977–present
- Parent(s): Paco Malgesto (father); Flor Silvestre (mother)

Marcela Rubiales Jiménez (born 16 April 1952) is a Mexican singer, actress, and television presenter. Due to her blond hair and sensual voice, she has been nicknamed La rubia sexy de la canción ranchera ("The Sexy Blonde of Ranchera Song").

For four consecutive years, she was the host of the Mexican television program Complicadísimo (1979-1982), a number-one rated show.

In 1980, she made her debut as a ranchera singer and signed a recording contract with EMI Capitol (now Universal Music Group), where she recorded her first hit singles: "Terroncito azucarado", "Cariño de mi cariño", "La verdad de la verdad", and "Échale un quinto al piano".

== Life ==
She is the daughter of announcer and presenter Paco Malgesto (Francisco Rubiales Calvo) and singer and actress Flor Silvestre (Guillermina Jiménez Chabolla). Her brother is Francisco "Paco" Rubiales. Her elder half-sister was presenter, actress, and director Cristina Rubiales Peñalosa (d. 2023).

== Discography ==
=== Studio albums ===
- Marcela Rubiales (1980)
- Échale un quinto al piano (1982)
- ¡Muy norteña! (1983)
- Papaloteando (1985)
- Tropical sabroso al estilo de Marcela Rubiales (1988)
- Yo seré como siempre (1991)
- Nada con exceso (1993)

== Awards and nominations ==
- In 1977, she was nominated for the Best Announcer-Presenter Award from the Mexican Association of Radio and Television Journalists (Asociación Mexicana de Radio y Televisión or AMPRyT)
