= List of Mexican films of 1948 =

A list of the films produced in Mexico in 1948 given in alphabetical order. (see 1948 in film):

== 1948 ==
Title	Director	Cast	Genre	Notes
1948
Adventure in the Night	Rolando Aguilar	Luis Aguilar, Miroslava, Susana Cora	Mystery	
Angelitos negros	Joselito Rodríguez	Pedro Infante, Emilia Guiú, Rita Montaner		
Aunt Candela	Julián Soler	Sara García, Abel Salazar, Manolo Fábregas	Comedy	
La bandida	Agustín P. Delgado	Rosa Carmina, Pedro Galindo, Su Muy Key		
Beau Ideal	Alejandro Galindo	Rodolfo Landa, Alejandro Ciangherotti, Alejandro Cobo	Adventure	
Courtesan	Alberto Gout	Meche Barba, Blanca Estela Pavón		
Esquina bajan...!	Alejandro Galindo	David Silva, Fernando Soto "Mantequilla", Olga Jiménez, Miguel Manzano		
The Flesh Commands	Chano Urueta	Esther Fernández, David Silva, Rosita Fornés	Drama	
The Game Rooster	Alberto Gout	Luis Aguilar, Carmelita González, Joan Page	Comedy	
Gangsters Versus Cowboys	Juan Orol	Juan Orol, Rosa Carmina, Roberto Cañedo	Crime	
¡Han matado a "Tongolele"!	Roberto Gavaldón	Tongolele, David Silva		
Jalisco Fair	Chano Urueta	Ramón Armengod, Ninón Sevilla, Perla Aguiar	Musical comedy	
The Last Night	René Cardona	Ramón Armengod, Rosita Quintana, Óscar Pulido	Drama	
Lola Casanova	Matilde Landeta	Meche Barba, Armando Silvestre, Isabela Corona	Western	
Los viejos somos así				
Maclovia	Emilio Fernández	María Félix, Pedro Armendáriz, Columba Domínguez	Drama	
Madam Temptation	José Díaz Morales	Ninón Sevilla, David Silva, Susana Guízar	Drama	
Marked Cards	René Cardona	Pedro Infante, Marga López, Francisco Reiguera	Comedy	
Music, Poetry and Madness	Humberto Gómez Landero	Tin Tan, Marcelo Chávez, Meche Barba	Comedy	
The Newlywed Wants a House	Gilberto Martínez Solares	María Elena Marqués, Rafael Baledón, Malú Gatica	Comedy	
Nosotros los pobres	Ismael Rodríguez	Pedro Infante, Evita Muñoz "Chachita"	Drama	
¡Que Dios me perdóne!	Tito Davison	María Félix, Fernando Soler		
Reina de Reinas	Miguel Contreras Torres	Luana Alcañiz, Luis Alcoriza, Luis Mussot, José Baviera, Carlos Villarias, Rafael Banquells, Carlos Martínez Baena		
Río Escondido	Emilio Fernández	María Félix, Fernando Fernández, Carlos López Moctezuma	Drama	
The Shadow of the Bridge	Roberto Gavaldón	Esther Fernández, David Silva, Rodolfo Landa	Drama	
Tania, the Beautiful Wild Girl	Juan Orol	Rosa Carmina, Manuel Arvide, Lilia Prado	Drama	
Los tres huastecos	Ismael Rodríguez	Pedro Infante		
Two of the Angry Life	Juan Bustillo Oro	Manuel Palacios, Estanislao Shilinsky, Amanda del Llano	Comedy	
Ustedes los ricos	Ismael Rodríguez	Pedro Infante, Evita Muñoz "Chachita"	Drama	
Adventures of Casanova	Roberto Gavaldón	Arturo de Córdova, Lucille Bremer, Turhan Bey		
Dueña y señora		Sara García		
El cuarto mandamiento	Rolando Aguilar	Domingo Soler, Carmelita González, Sara Montes, Emma Roldán		
Enrédate y verás	Carlos Orellana			
Flor de caña	Carlos Orellana			
Gangster's Kingdom	Juan Orol	Juan Orol, Rosa Carmina		
I Will Never Leave You	Francisco Elías	Anita Blanch, Tito Novaro, Guillermo Núñez Keith		
Juan Charrasqueado	Ernesto Cortázar	Pedro Armendáriz, Miroslava, Fernando Soto		
Los que volvieron	Alejandro Galindo	Sara García, David Silva, Malú Gatica		
Nocturne of Love	Emilio Gómez Muriel	Miroslava, Víctor Junco, Hilda Sour		
Revenge	Alberto Gout	Ninón Sevilla, David Silva, Agustín Lara		
Spurs of Gold	Agustín P. Delgado	Pedro Galindo, Crox Alvarado, Amanda del Llano		
The Genius	Miguel M. Delgado	Cantinflas, Perla Aguiar, Carlos Martínez Baena		
The Well-paid	Alberto Gout	María Antonieta Pons, Víctor Junco		
