= Rumberas film =

Film genre

The Rumberas film (in Spanish, Cine de rumberas) was a film genre that flourished in Mexico's Golden Age of Mexican cinema in the 1940s and 1950s. Its major stars were the so-called rumberas, dancers of Afro-Caribbean musical rhythms. The genre is a film curiosity, one of the most fascinating hybrids of the international cinema.

Today, thanks to their unique characteristics, they are considered cult films. The Rumberas film is one of the contributions of Mexican cinema to international cinema. The Rumberas film represented a social view of the Mexico of the 1940s and 1950s, specifically of those women considered sinners and prostitutes, who confronted the moral and social conventions of their time. The genre was a more realistic approach to the Mexican society of that time. It was melodramas about the lives of these women, who were redeemed through exotic dances.

== Etymology ==
The rumberas were the dancers and actresses that swayed to Afro-Caribbean rhythms in Mexican cinema's Golden Age of the 1940s and 1950s. The term rumbera comes from the so-called Cuban rumba that was popular in Mexico and Latin America from the late 19th century to the early 1950s. Eventually new tropical rhythms such as the mambo and the cha-cha-chá displaced the Cuban rumba as the most popular Latin music genre; the rumberas adopted these new rhythms and used them in their films.

== Origins ==
The rumberas films have their roots in various film genres. The film noir, very popular in Hollywood and other film industries in the 1930s and 1940s, can be considered their cornerstone, given the urban environment of the genre. Film noir was characterized by having among its protagonists the femme fatales, the cabaret women who aroused the passions of men and were often the source of conflict in the plot. Gloria Grahame and Rita Hayworth created film noir images of women who enjoy singing cabaret and simultaneously make men suffer. Their other base was the Hollywood musical of the 1930s, epitomized by Busby Berkeley and his famous colorful and extravagant musical numbers endowed with a deep aesthetic expression. Although not in such stylized form (due to limited budgets), rumberas films tried to imitate in their musical numbers the guidelines of the genre. Finally, the film genre was enriched by the Urban social cinema or melodramatic films, whose principal artisan in Mexico was the filmmaker Alejandro Galindo. All this mix of elements and genres can be considered the basis of rumberas film.

In the Rumberas films the main heroines are women, generally humble and naive, who, because of a bad move of fate, are forced to fall into the underworld of prostitution and get involved with gangsters and pimps. These women suffered through most of the time. The plot allowing them only a few moments of pleasure in the movie. Invariably the "sinner woman" had to find her punishment. The stars of this genre became objects of worship, but also of criticism and contempt of the hypocritical judgment of the hearings.

In general, Mexican cinema was characterized by representing the prostitute as the main figure on numerous occasions, from the good-hearted prostitute represented in Santa (1932), to the tragic prostitute reflected in Woman of the Port (1934). In the Rumberas films, these tragic heroines also danced and radiated sensuality.

=== Origins in vaudeville ===
The rumberas first came to the theatrical stage in the late 19th century, at the time of vaudeville and burlesque, accompanying the many comedians and buffs of Cuban origin who settled in Mexico City. From the early 20th century until the 1920s, in the age of the great Mexican vedettes of the frivolous theater (as María Conesa or Lupe Vélez), rumba dancers began to emerge. Lolita Téllez Wood is popularly considered the first dancer to popularize West Indian rhythms. During the course of the next decade, many rumberas and vedettes from Cuba came to Mexico.

== In the cinema ==
The concept of the "rumbera" has been embodied in Mexican cinema since the first talkies in the early 1930s. The actress Maruja Griffel was the first to dance the rumba, in the film ¡Que viva México! (Sergei Eisenstein, 1931). She was followed by others such as Consuelo Moreno in Mujeres sin alma, ¿Venganza suprema?, Rita Montaner in La noche del pecado (1933), and Margarita Mora in Águila o Sol (1937). In addition, the Puerto Rican actress Mapy Cortés (called "The Rumbera Blanca") was famous for dancing the conga in numerous films. Lolita Téllez Wood participated in three Mexican films: El rosal bendito (Juan Bustillo Oro, 1936), Mujeres de hoy (Ramón Peon, 1936) and Honrarás a tus padres (1936), the latter directed by Juan Orol, considered the "spiritual father" of the rumberas film.

Juan Orol was born in Spain but grew up in Cuba, where he lived in the "solares", as they are known in Cuba to the low-income neighborhoods. There he had much contact with people of African origin, who him taught all their dancing techniques. After establishing himself as a film director in Mexico, Orol became famous for the importation of numerous Cuban figures to the Mexican cinema. María Antonieta Pons was one of his discoveries. It is common to recognize her as the first cinematographic rumbera, following her debut in Siboney (1938), a film inspired by the music of Ernesto Lecuona and directed by Orol, who quickly realized he had a goldmine after Siboney became a blockbuster. Thus, the rumberas film gradually took shape. The dancer Estela invented the maracas at the waist, to do more flashy musical numbers. Another leading figure was the Cuban dancer Celina, who choreographed numerous films. In Cuba, the Mexican Luz Gil was considered the master of all the rumberas. Although the Rumba was the initial musical genre that was danced in these productions, soon other tropical rhythms were added to the repertoire, such as mambo, conga, calypso music, samba, cha-cha-chá and bolero. Artists such as Pérez Prado, Benny Moré, Agustín Lara, Kiko Mendive, Toña la Negra, Rita Montaner, Maria Luisa Landín, Olga Guillot, Pedro Vargas, Amparo Montes and others deserve a special mention since their voices accompanied the rumberas in their musical numbers and contributed to their luster. Many popular boleros of the time (mainly the songs of Agustín Lara, dedicated to prostitutes), served as inspiration for arguments or titles of the rumberas films (The well paid, Perverted Woman, Adventurous, Traicionera, etc.)

=== Rise of the genre ===
During the administration of the Mexican President Miguel Alemán Valdés (1946–1952), the growth of Mexico City as a great metropolis was reflected in the huge boom in cabarets and nightlife around the town. The Mexican Cinema was influenced by this phenomenon. The rural settings that set the tone in the first half of the 1940s began to lose ground against the new melodramas with urban and suburban settings. The famous film Salon Mexico (Emilio Fernández, 1950), marked the transition of the role of the heroine, from the campirano and naive women to the low class young sinners, "night women" dragged by urban revolution to the suburbs and perdition. In this sense, even with all its fancy and tropical extravagance, the rumberas film was a genre that showed a more authentic form of social life of Mexico at the time, without false stylized images that were shown in films from Emilio Fernández and other directors. However, there is also another type of heroine in the Rumberas films. They can not be called "sinners", since they belong to a primitive and amoral universes that does not know the concept of sin. They are the "jungle rumberas" (Tania, Sandra, Yambaó, Zonga, Tahími), inspired by characters from illustrated novels and taken to the movies mainly by Juan Orol.

Although it is common to recognize María Antonieta Pons as the first film "rumbera", the film Humo en los ojos (1946), directed by the filmmaker Alberto Gout and starring by Meche Barba, was the film that began the mass production of rumberas films because the big Mexican film studios found large sales from them at the box office. The film Aventurera (1950), also directed by Alberto Gout and starring Ninón Sevilla, is considered the masterpiece of the genre. What is remarkable is that the most obvious characteristics of rumberas film (songs, dances, actors, scenery) are easily identifiable in Aventurera and do not differ much from any other films.

However, there is also another type of heroine in the rumberas film. They can not receive the appellation of "sinners", since they belong to a primitive and amoral universe that does not know the concept of sin. They are the "jungle rumberas" (Tania, Sandra, Zonga, Tahími), inspired in personages of illustrated novels and carried to the cinema mainly by Juan Orol.

The rumberas film, unique to Mexico, reached the attention of many specialized critics. François Truffaut, still writing for Cahiers du cinéma, wrote a dossier on this exotic subgenre. The critics of Cahiers du cinéma wrote some of the most ardent pages dedicated to Mexican actresses. It is also important to emphasize that some rumberas (as Rosa Carmina or Ninon Sevilla), managed to combine around them filming teams that gave them success as few actresses attained in Mexican cinema (perhaps a privilege only limited to María Félix and Dolores del Río).

It is also important to note that due to the success of rumberas film, many other films were created, which together, allowed the Mexican film industry to consolidate itself. Today, the industry is struggling, despite very specific successes.

== The Queens of the Tropics ==
According to experts and film critics, of all the rumberas who performed in the rumberas film in the Mexican cinema, only five of them have managed to go down in history as the leading exponents of the genre. They were María Antonieta Pons (1922–2000), Meche Barba (1922–2000), Ninón Sevilla (1929–2015), Amalia Aguilar (1924–2021) and Rosa Carmina (1929). In 1993, the journalist Fernando Muñoz Castillo, named them The Queens of the Tropics (Spanish: Las Reinas del Trópico, after the film The Queen of the Tropics). None resembles the other. All were different, not only in their styles of dance, but also in their films, which enjoyed a particular and unique style and label.

=== María Antonieta Pons (1922–2004) ===
Pons was Mexican cinema's first rumbera, and set the tone that distinguishes the genre. Maritoña (as she was also called) came to Mexico in 1938 with her then-husband, the Spanish filmmaker Juan Orol. Pons worked with varying success in suburban melodramas, kids' movies, and family comedies. Despite her voluptuous dance style, the actress has always maintained in a particular way in her films (especially those she made her second husband, filmmaker Ramón Pereda). Her most important films include Siboney (1938), Red Konga (1943), Caribbean Charm (1945), The Queen of the Tropics (1945), The Caribbean Cyclone (1950), The Queen of the Mambo (1950), and María Cristina (1951). After the decline of the rumberas she tried to enter, with little success, other film genres, such as comedy. After her last film, released in 1965, she remained isolated from public life until her death

=== Meche Barba (1922–2000) ===
Barba was the only Mexican among the five greatest exponents of the genre, and is also known as "The Mexican Rumbera". She began her career as a child in popular theater. She debuted in film in 1944. Her foray into rumberas film began with Rosalinda (1945). She starred in Smoke in the Eyes (1946), a film credited with starting the mass production of rumberas films. With her Mexican origin, Barba lacked the characteristic flavor and sensuality of the dances of the Cuban rumberas. She employed a more measured style, accented by excellent melodramatic technique. Her films include Courtesan (1947), Fire Venus (1948), Love of the Street (1950), If I Were Just Anyone (1950), When Children Sin (1952), The Naked Woman (1953), and Ambitious (1953), among others. She formed a famous film couple with the singer and actor Fernando Fernández. She retired from films early, but reappeared on television in the 1980s, where she remained active until her death.

=== Amalia Aguilar (1924–2021) ===
Also known as the "Atomic Bomb", Aguilar arrived in Mexico in 1945 with the Cuban dancer Julio Richard. Her enormous charisma and extraordinary dance technique opened the doors of the film industry and gave her the opportunity to break into Hollywood. Unlike her colleagues, she broke with the stereotype of the femme fatale. Rarely was she a suffering or evil woman, preferring to lean toward light comedy. Aguilar appeared as the dumbbell of popular Mexican comedians such as Germán "Tin Tan" Valdés and Adalberto "Resortes" Martínez. Her films include Perverted Woman (1946), Tender Zucchinis (1948), Caribbean Rhythms (1950), The Rhythm of the Mambo (1950), Lost Love (1951), The Three Happy Girls (1952), Interested Women(1952), Mis tres viudas alegres (1953), and The Loving Ones (1953 ), among others. Although she withdrew from acting for several decades, she makes frequent appearances at public events.

=== Ninón Sevilla (1921–2015) ===
Sevilla began her training in nightclubs in Cuba and arrived in Mexico in 1946 at the behest of filmmaker and producer Fernando Cortés. She was an exclusive star of Calderon Films, and managed to create a solid film team around her that contributed to her brilliance (Alberto Gout, Alex Phillips, Alvaro Custodio). Endowed with exotic beauty and harmonious anatomy, Sevilla was the favorite of markets such as France and Brazil. She was a complete vedette; she not only danced and acted, but also sang and choreographed her own musical numbers, which were always colorful, exotic and extravagant. Her films include Lost Woman (1949), Adventuress (1949), Victims of Sin (1950), Sensuality (1950), Adventure in Rio (1953), Mulatta (1954), and Yambaó (1956), among others. Of all the rumberas, Sevilla was the boldest and most daring in interpreting the archetype of the femme fatale, the sinful cabaret woman. After retiring from films for over a decade, she returned in the eighties, and remained active in television until her death

=== Rosa Carmina (born 1929) ===
Owner of a unique stature (unusual among the actresses of the time) and a stunning physical beauty, Rosa Carmina came to Mexico in 1946 after being discovered by Juan Orol in Cuba. In the same year she made her debut in the film A woman from the East. Carmina was not only an exponent of the rumberas film, but also the Mexican film noir. For this reason she was called "The Queen of the Gangsters". Among her most important films are Tania, the Beautiful Wild Girl (1947), Gangsters Versus Cowboys (1947), Wild Love (1949), In the Flesh (1951), Voyager (1952), The Goddess of Tahiti (1953), and Sandra, the Woman of Fire (1954), among others. In her film career she displayed a versatility rarely seen in any actress, appearing in melodrama, horror, action, drama, and fantasy films. After sporadic appearances on television, she retired in 1992. She currently resides in Spain.

=== Other rumberas ===
There are other dancers who performed in rumberas films, but who, for various reasons, had only a fleeting step on the screen:

- Marquita Rivera (1922–2002): Puerto Rican dancer. She arrived in Mexico due to Mexican actor and filmmaker Fernando Soler. She starred in only two films in Mexico, and was most popular in nightclubs and some Hollywood musical films.
- Blanquita Amaro (1923–2007): Popular Cuban vedette. She filmed some Mexican movies in the 1940s, but won stardom in the cinema of Argentina in the 1950s.
- Olga Chaviano (1925–2003): A successful star of the cabarets of her time. She was called "The Queen of the Mambo". She filmed some Mexican films in the 1950s, but she is removed from the show to be involved with the gangster Norman Rothman.
- Yadira Jiménez (1928–?): Costa Rican actress and singer. She appeared in some films in Cuba and arrived to Mexico in 1946. Juan Orol directed her in the film The Love of my Bohio (1946). In the late 1940s and the early 1950s she played numerous villain roles in Mexican films.
- Lina Salomé (?-?): Another popular Cuban dancer. She worked in the Mexican cinema between 1952 and 1957.
- The Dolly Sisters (Caridad and Mercedes Vazquez): Popular dance couple (inspired by the original Dolly Sisters of the early 20th century). They were part of Pérez Prado musical numbers in several movies.
- Mary Esquivel (?-2007): She was the third cinematographic muse of Juan Orol (after María Antonieta Pons and Rosa Carmina), having been discovered by the director in Cuba in 1956. She formed a film team with Orol between 1956 and 1963, and was the star of Zonga, The Diabolic Angel (1957), a popular cult film directed by Orol. After her divorce from Orol, she left show business.
- Dinorah Judith (1948–2005): Fourth muse and star of the Juan Orol films. She worked with the filmmaker between 1964 and 1972. She was a classic dancer. Among her most popular films with Orol was the counterculture film The Fantastic World of the Hippies (1972).

Many actresses also danced tropical rhythms in some films. Among them are: Rosita Quintana, Elsa Aguirre, Lilia Prado, Leticia Palma, Lilia del Valle, Silvia Pinal, Ana Bertha Lepe, Evangelina Elizondo and Ana Luisa Peluffo.

=== The Exóticas ===
It is a common mistake to confuse the rumberas with the Exóticas. Even though they also performed in the Mexican cinema, they danced to different rhythms (Polynesian, Eastern, African, Tahitian, Hawaiian, etc.). Due to censorship of films, the Exóticas lived their moment of glory at nightclubs, and only later came to film. Some used exotic names. Among the most famous are Su Muy Key, Kalantan, Trudi Bora, Bongala, Eda Lorna, Joyce Camerón, Friné, Francia, Turanda, Josefina del Mar, Brenda Conde, Joyce Cameron, and Gemma. The most striking of all was Tongolele, probably the only Exotica to have a relatively distinguished career in film.

== Principal filmmakers ==
Between 1946 and 1959 there were more than a hundred rumberas films. The principal directors are:

- Juan Orol
- Alberto Gout
- Ramón Pereda
- Jaime Salvador
- José Díaz Morales
- Joaquín Pardavé
- Emilio Fernández
- Ernesto Cortazar
- Gilberto Martínez Solares
- Ramón Peón
- Miguel Morayta
- Alfredo B. Crevenna

== Films ==
The notable films were:

- Siboney (1938)
- Red Konga (1943)
- Perverted Woman (1945)
- Caribbean Charm (1946)
- Smoke in the Eyes (1946)
- The Queen of the Tropic (1946)
- The Well-paid (1948)
- Tania, the Beautiful Wild Girl (1948)
- Wild Love (1949)
- Caribbean Rhythms (1950)
- Adventuress (1950)
- Cabaret Shangai (1950)
- Victims of Sin (1950)
- The Queen of the Mambo (1950)
- Love of the Street (1950)
- If I Were Just Anyone (1950)
- María Cristina (1951)
- Lost Love (1951)
- Sensuality (1951)
- In the Flesh (1951)
- When Children Sin (1952)
- Voyager (1952)
- Adventure in Rio (1952)
- The Naked Woman (1953)
- Devil Money (1953)
- Ambitious (1953)
- The Goddess of Tahiti (1953)
- Take Me in Your Arms (1954)
- Mulatta (1954)
- Sandra, the Woman of Fire (1954)
- The Widows of the Cha cha cha (1955)
- Yambaó (1956)

== Decline of the genre ==
By the mid-fifties, the rumberas film had lost originality. All actresses appeared in similar roles and the genre gradually ceased to be attractive to the public. The end of the rumberas film also marks the end of the administration of President Miguel Alemán. The new administration was much less tolerant of the nightlife that had flourished in Mexico City, and it soon lost the splendor it had enjoyed years back. The Mexican cinema in general was about to begin its precipitous decline. The strong sexual load of these films (in its time), also presages the arrival of a new type of erotic cinema. While on the screens of Mexican cinema began the opening, in real life the "defenders of morality" gain ground.

The genre was further attacked by radical groups such as the "Legion of Decency" which had the support of the authorities, and considered the genre a breach of morality and decency because it depicted the image of the prostitute, the "sinful woman". The prevailing double standards in Mexican society led to the marginalization of the rumberas in the film industry. The decline of rumberas films coincides with the ending the nightlife of Mexico City. A rain of decrees and regulations caused massive closure of nightclubs, variety theaters and dance halls that had served as a springboard and showcase to the most famous rumberas. Even the Mexican Academy of Motion Picture Arts and Sciences for many years prevented rumberas actresses from receiving the Silver Ariel Award.

In addition, in the second half of the 1950s, as a consequence of a series of changes in popular culture, Mexican cinema definitively diverted its focus towards new rhythms and problems.

The rumberas began to move towards other film genres, took refuge in their personal shows in theaters and nightclubs, or opted for retirement. The film Caña Brava (1965), starring María Antonieta Pons, is considered to be the last rumberas film production, and can even be considered a kind of memorial to the genre.

The end of the genre is abrupt, without decadence, after almost two decades of resounding success. Figures like Ninón Sevilla, Meche Barba, and Rosa Carmina chose to migrate to television. However, the prevailing censorship of Mexican television marginalized the rumberas once again, limiting them to guest appearances on Mexican telenovelas, usually as characters with no relation to their cinematic history and legend.

== Genre reevaluation ==
In the 1970s, Mexico City experienced a new golden age of nightlife and cabarets. This was made possible, in large part, by the demise of the "League of Decency". Mexican cinema, which had success early in the decade, again fell into decline with the rise of low-quality sexploitation films. The clearest example was the rise of the so-called cine de ficheras in the late seventies and early eighties. Like the rumberas film, the Cine de ficheras is based on the nightlife of women of the cabaret, but from a very different context, since by that time, film censorship had been relaxed and international cinema was at the epicenter of the sexual revolution. The cine de ficheras used explicit nudity to attract audiences to the box office, in contrast to the work of the rumberas, who had never needed to display their bodies in an explicit way to achieve success. However, the rise of cabaret scenes in Mexican cinema began to provoke nostalgia among audiences, who slowly began demanding the presence of the authentic "Queens of the Night" on the screen. Some rumberas began to reappear, first in films and later in television. The Mexican Academy of Film first recognized the careers of Ninon Sevilla in 1984 and Meche Barba in 1992.

The telenovelas writer Carlos Romero became a vital figure for the revaluation of the genre by rescuing several rumberas from obscurity and honoring them in telenovelas like La pasión de Isabela in 1984, and Salomé in 2001. The telenovelas of the Mexican pop singer Thalía were vital meeting points of the great rumberas, who found a new way to stay current in the public memory and to approach new generations as popular legends. Many film festivals around the world began to pay homage to the rumberas film.

Between 1997 and 2011, Mexican actress Carmen Salinas revived the classic Aventurera through a musical stage play (the longest in history in Mexico) in which she pays homage to the heyday of the rumberas film. The stage play made it to Broadway and has been led by various actresses like Edith González, Itatí Cantoral, Niurka Marcos and Maribel Guardia, among others. In the same vein, other musical plays (as Perfume de Gardenia), are inspired by the old rumberas film.

In 2012, the biographical film El fantástico mundo de Juan Orol, directed by Sebastian del Amo, and inspired by the life and work of filmmaker Juan Orol, was released. The film shows a summary of the origins and rise of the rumberas film from the 1940s and 1950s.

== Bibliography ==
- Muñoz Castillo, Fernando (1993). Las Reinas del Tropico: María Antonieta Pons, Meche Barba, Amalia Aguilar, Ninón Sevilla & Rosa Carmina. Grupo Azabache. ISBN 968-6084-85-1.
- Las Rumberas del Cine Mexicano (The Rumberas of the Mexican Cinema) (1999). In SOMOS. México: Editorial Televisa, S. A. de C. V.
- Agrasánchez Jr., Rogelio (2001). Bellezas del cine mexicano/Beauties of Mexican Cinema. Archivo Fílmico Agrasánchez. ISBN 968-5077-11-8.
