= Siboney =

Siboney may refer to:

== Arts ==
- Siboney (film), a Mexican-Cuban drama film
- "Siboney" (song), a 1929 song by Ernesto Lecuona
- Siboney, a 1985 album by Slim Gaillard

== Places ==
- Siboney, Cuba, a town in eastern Cuba
- Siboney, Oklahoma, a town absorbed by the town of Manitou, Oklahoma
- Siboney, a neighborhood in Playa, Havana in Cuba

== Other uses ==
- The Ciboney or Siboney, an Indigenous people of Cuba
- Siboney de Cuba, a cattle breed
- USS Siboney, two U.S. Navy ships of the name
