= Riveron =

Riveron or Riverón may refer to:

- Alberto Riveron (born 1960), Cuban-born American football official
- Enrique Riveron (1902–1998) Cuban-born American visual artist, designer, and educator
- Omar Arellano Riverón (born 1987) Mexican footballer
- Rosa Carmina Riverón Jiménez (born 1929), Mexican actress and dancer
- Alejandro Zaldívar-Riverón, Mexican entomologist
