= Treacherous (film) =

1950 film

- Directed by: Ernesto Cortázar
- Written by: Ernesto Cortázar
- Produced by: Alfonso Rosas Priego
- Starring: Rosa Carmina; Fernando Fernández; Dagoberto Rodríguez
- Cinematography: Domingo Carrillo
- Edited by: Alfredo Rosas Priego
- Music by: Gonzalo Curiel
- Production company: Producciones Rosas Priego
- Distributed by: Películas Nacionales; Clasa-Mohme (US)
- Release date: 22 November 1950
- Running time: 88 minutes
- Country: Mexico
- Language: Spanish

Treacherous (Spanish: Traicionera) is a 1950 Mexican drama film directed by Ernesto Cortázar and starring Rosa Carmina, Fernando Fernández and Dagoberto Rodríguez. It is part of the wave of Rumberas films made during the Golden Age of Mexican Cinema. It was shot at the Azteca Studios in Mexico City. The film's sets were designed by the art director Jorge Fernández.

== Synopsis ==
An engaged man falls in love with Raquel, a cabaret dancer. Eventually he realises his mistake and returns to his fiancée. They marry but Raquel seeks revenge against them both.

== Cast ==
- Rosa Carmina as Raquel
- Fernando Fernández as Carlos
- Alicia Neira as Malena
- Dagoberto Rodríguez as Guillermo
- Josefina Escobedo as Doña Mariquita
- Mimí Derba as Doña Juana
- Juan Bruno Tarraza as Juan Bruno
- Adelina García as Cantante
- Víctor Alcocer as Don Víctor

== Bibliography ==
- Riera, Emilio García. Historia documental del cine mexicano: 1949. Ediciones Era, 1969.
- Wilt, David E. The Mexican Filmography, 1916 through 2001. McFarland, 2024.
