= Siboney (song) =

Show tune composed by Ernesto Lecuona

Single by Rita Montaner
- Language: Spanish
- B-side: "La gitana"
- Written: 1927
- Published: 1927
- Released: 1928
- Genre: Latin pop
- Length: 3:04
- Label: Columbia
- Songwriter: Ernesto Lecuona

"Siboney", also known as "Canto Siboney", is a 1927 song by Cuban composer Ernesto Lecuona. It was part of the 1927 revue La tierra de Venus, which featured singer Rita Montaner. The music is in cut time, originally written in C major. The lyrics were reportedly written by Lecuona while away from Cuba and is about the homesickness he was experiencing. The term "Siboney" refers to one of the Indigenous tribes that inhabited Cuba before the arrival of the Spanish colonists and acts as a symbol for the island.

Siboney is both the name of a coastal village in Eastern Cuba and of a neighborhood in the Playa borough of Havana. In the song, Siboney stands for the island of Cuba, for which Lecuona was very homesick.

Siboney became a hit in 1931 when performed by Alfredo Brito and His Siboney Orchestra. Other artists followed suit, including Caterina Valente, Olga Guillot, Xiomara Alfaro, Dizzy Gillespie, René Touzet (1954), Nana Mouskouri and Percy Faith. It was recorded by Connie Francis in 1960, and later included in the film 2046.

English lyrics were written by Dolly Morse, but they bear no resemblance to the original Spanish. The English version of the song was recorded by Bing Crosby on 11 February 1945 with Xavier Cugat conducting the Waldorf-Astoria Orchestra. Later in the same decade (1949) it was recorded for Muzak by Alfredo Antonini and his orchestra in collaboration with Victoria Cordova and John Serry Sr.

== Film appearances ==
This song has an appearance in the 1931 film Tarnished Lady by George Cukor starring Tallulah Bankhead and Clive Brook.

In the 1940 film Third Finger, Left Hand starring Myrna Loy and Melvyn Douglas, "Siboney" is played in the nightclub scene by the band. They dance the rumba to it.

Grace Moore performed the song in the 1937 film When You're in Love.

In 1942, Gloria Jean sang the English version in the musical Get Hep to Love.

The song inspired the Mexican-Cuban film Siboney, directed by Juan Orol and starring María Antonieta Pons. The film was released in 1938 as a part of the so-called Rumberas film saga of the Mexican Cinema.

In 2004, Hong Kong director Wong Kar-Wai included the Connie Francis version in his romantic drama / science fiction period film, 2046. Of using Spanish-language music in his films, Wong has stated that it evokes the time period, the 1960s, as Latin music was popular in Hong Kong at the time.

In 2005, the Connie Francis version was included briefly in Michael Bay's 2005 science fiction dystopian film The Island, where Lincoln Six Echo (Ewan McGregor) and Jordan Two Delta (Scarlett Johansson) are at the maglev station in Yucca after they ask the help of James McCord (Steve Buscemi).

The Ralph Thamar version was included in Claire Denis' 2008 film, 35 Rhums.

The song was used by Nino Rota in the score for Fellini's nostalgic memoir of the 1930s, Amarcord.
