= Wild Love =

Wild Love may refer to:

- Wild Love (film), a 1955 Italian film
- Amor salvaje (Wild Love), a 1950 Mexican drama film
- Wild Love (album), a 1995 album by Smog

== Songs ==
- "Wild Love" (Cashmere Cat song), 2016
- "Wild Love" (James Bay song), 2018
- "Wild Love", by Bonnie Tyler from Goodbye to the Island
- "Wild Love", by Chris Isaak from Chris Isaak
- "Wild Love", by Krokus from Heart Attack
- "Wild Love", by Frank Zappa from Sheik Yerbouti
- "Wild Love", by Elle King
- "Wild Love", by Faul & Wad Ad, 2018
- "Wild Love", by Mungo Jerry
- "Wild Love", by Rea Garvey

== See also ==
- Wild Is Love, a 1960 album by American singer and pianist Nat King Cole
- "Wild Wild Love", a song by American rapper Pitbull from the 2014 album Globalization
