= Cabaret Shanghai =

1950 film

Cabaret Shangai
- Directed by: Juan Orol
- Written by: Jose G. Cruz; Juan Orol
- Produced by: Juan Orol
- Starring: Rosa Carmina; Manuel Arvide; Amparo Arozamena
- Cinematography: Domingo Carrillo
- Edited by: Juan José Marino
- Music by: Antonio Rosado
- Production company: España Sono Films
- Release date: 31 August 1950
- Running time: 96 minutes
- Country: Mexico
- Language: Spanish

Cabaret Shanghai (Spanish: Cabaret Shangai) is a 1950 Mexican musical crime drama film directed by Juan Orol. and starring Rosa Carmina, Manuel Arvide and Amparo Arozamena. It was part of the trend of Rumberas films, popular during the Golden Age of Mexican Cinema. It was shot at the Azteca Studios in Mexico City. The film's sets were designed by the art director Ramón Rodríguez Granada.

== Plot ==
Alberto (Robert Romaña), the confidant of Tony (Juan Orol), a gangster owner of the Cabaret Shanghai, departs from the business when his boss's lover, Mary Ruth (Rosa Carmina) shown affectionate with him. The destination will soon torment these cursed lovers, who will be chased by the police as well as by the betrayed gangster.

== Cast ==
- Rosa Carmina as Mary Ruth
- Roberto Romaña as Alfredo
- Manuel Arvide as Inspector Arriaga
- Amparo Arozamena as Eva Romagnoli
- Salvador Quiroz as Comisario
- Juanita Riverón as Rita
- Tana Lynn as La gringa
- Amelia Wilhelmy as Borracha comisaria
- José Pardavé as Borracho comisaria
- Rafael Icardo as Doctor
- Tony Flandes as Esbirro de Tony
- Armando Arriola as El Polilla
- Roberto Corell as Peluquero comisaria
- Carlos Rincón Gallardo as Hombre afeminado comisaria
- Marco de Carlo as Marco
- Genaro de Alba as Esbirro de Tony
- Pedro Ibarra as Esbirro de Tony
- Juan Orol as Tony
- Víctor Alcocer as Mesero
- Kika Meyer as Cabaretera

== Reviews ==
The musical numbers of Rosa Carmina in the cabaret adorn this melodrama directed by the incomparable Juan Orol, who transcends the rules of the genre to mix both the gangster films as the romantic drama.

== Bibliography ==
- Riera, Emilio García. Historia documental del cine mexicano: 1949. Ediciones Era, 1969.
- Wilt, David E. The Mexican Filmography, 1916 through 2001. McFarland, 2024.
