= In the Flesh (1951 film) =

1951 film

- Directed by: Alberto Gout
- Written by: Alberto Gout
- Produced by: Alfonso Rosas Priego
- Starring: Rosa Carmina; Crox Alvarado; Rubén Rojo
- Cinematography: Agustín Jiménez
- Edited by: Alfonso Rosas Priego
- Music by: Rosalío Ramírez
- Production company: Producciones Rosas Priego
- Release date: February 24, 1951 (México)
- Running time: 91 minutes
- Country: Mexico
- Language: Spanish

In the Flesh (Spanish En carne viva) is a 1951 Mexican musical drama film directed by Alberto Gout and starring Rosa Carmina, Crox Alvarado and Rubén Rojo. It was shot at the Azteca Studios in Mexico City. The film's sets were designed by the art director Francisco Marco Chillet. It is a Rumberas film, a genre popular during the Golden Age of Mexican Cinema.

== Plot ==
Maria Antonia (Rosa Carmina) is a naive cabaret dancer who is seduced and abandoned by a sailor named Fernando (Crox Alvarado). After giving birth to their daughter, her suicide marks the life of her daughter Laura, who upon reach her youth follows in the footsteps of her mother and becomes a successful dancer. The twists of fate take Laura to live delirious and distressing family recognitions.

== Cast ==
- Rosa Carmina as María Antonia / Laura
- Crox Alvarado as Fernando Herrera
- Rubén Rojo as Arturo
- Dagoberto Rodríguez as Miguel Hernández
- Toña la Negra as Mercé
- José María Linares-Rivas as Don Hilario
- Alfredo Varela as Chepo
- Maruja Grifell as Sara
- Celia Viveros as Lola
- Carlos Riquelme as Tío Luis
- Cecilia Yolandita Trujillo as Laurita
- Juan Bruno Tarraza as Pianista

== Reviews ==
The film was created as a vehicle for showcasing of the beautiful Cuban-Mexican rumbera Rosa Carmina. Very neat formally, En carne viva has his best times during the first hour of the film, where the native beauty of Rosa Carmina stands with own light among the foliage of a Veracruz recreated in a studio where Rosa Carmina seems her princess blue. Above all, the film is a feast for the eyes to recreate again and again in the beauty of the Cuban-Mexican actress, who runs very well her character: not only her oblique and distrustful look is enormously seductive, also it is very believable as she very going from the tenderness to the sensuality and from anguish to the wise resignation.

The producer, Alfonso Rosas Priego had a particularly fond of the argument. The film is also rehearsed like theater, it was very rare in the cinema of that time.

== Bibliography ==
- Wilt, David E. The Mexican Filmography, 1916 through 2001. McFarland, 2024.
