= A Woman of the East =

1946 film

- Directed by: Juan Orol
- Written by: Abelardo L. Gómez; Juan Orol
- Produced by: Juan Orol
- Starring: Rosa Carmina; Carlos López Moctezuma; Carlos Badías
- Cinematography: Ross Fisher
- Edited by: Juan José Marino
- Music by: Julio Brito
- Production company: España Sono Films
- Distributed by: Pereda Films
- Release date: 4 June 1946
- Running time: 98 minutes
- Country: Mexico
- Language: Spanish

A Woman of the East (Spanish: Una mujer de Oriente) is a 1946 Mexican spy thriller film directed by Juan Orol and starring Rosa Carmina, Carlos López Moctezuma and Carlos Badías. The film's sets were designed by the art director Ramón Rodríguez Granada.

== Cast ==
- Rosa Carmina as Loti
- Carlos López Moctezuma as Amaru Saito
- Carlos Badías as Capitán Raymond
- Clifford Carr as Sargento
- Raúl Lechuga as Agente policía
- Stephen Berne as Kobi
- Fernando Flaquer as Agente policía
- Juan Orol as Coronel Randolph Campbell
- Héctor Mateos as Jackson
- Ramón Pandal as Secuaz de Jackson
- Ildefonso Vega as Sirviente mudo
- Ignacio Villalbazo as Hombre golpeado cabaret

== Bibliography ==
- Alfaro, Eduardo de la Vega. Juan Orol. Universidad de Guadalajara, 1987.
- Navitski, Rielle & Poppe, Nicolas (ed.) Cosmopolitan Film Cultures in Latin America, 1896–1960. Indiana University Press, 2017.
