= Viajera =

- Directed by: Alfonso Patiño Gómez
- Written by: Afonso Patiño Gómez
- Produced by: J. Ramón Aguirre; Salvador Elizondo
- Starring: Rosa Carmina; Fernando Fernández; Miguel Manzano
- Cinematography: Jorge Stahl Jr.
- Music by: Rosalio Ramírez; Federico Ruiz
- Distributed by: CLASA Films Mundiales
- Release date: March 14, 1952 (México)
- Running time: 100 min.
- Country: Mexico
- Language: Spanish

Viajera (English: Voyager) is a Mexican drama film directed by Alfonso Patiño Gómez. It was released in 1952 and starred Rosa Carmina and Fernando Fernández.

== Plot ==
Blanca Lilia Nuñez (Rosa Carmina) is a successful singer, dancer, and cabaret star known as "Katya". Unfortunately, she is exploited and manipulated by a gangster nicknamed "El Danzón" (Miguel Manzano), who pretends to be her representative and makes her an accomplice in all his crimes. Because of this, Blanca Lilia cannot take root anywhere and roams around the world relying on her career as a dancer.

Elsewhere, Alfonso (Fernando Fernández) is a straitlaced teacher of classical music, who tells off his students if they attend Katya's shows. Alfonso and Blanca Lilia meet in Cuba. Alfonso immediately feels a strong attraction towards the woman. Their torrid romance in Havana is interrupted by the intrigues of El Danzón. Blanca Lilia leaves again without saying anything to Alfonso, who ends up returning to Mexico. Back home, Alfonso tries to rebuild his life and marries Ana (Georgina Barragán). Unfortunately, Ana is unable to have children. But Alfonso does not forget Blanca Lilia, and writes a song for her called Viajera (Voyager).

Twelve years later, Blanca Lilia returns to Mexico with her show. Alfonso meets her again: but Blanca Lilia gets involved in El Danzón's theft of an expensive jewel. In the confusion, Blanca Lilia places the jewel in Alfonso's bag, and this jewel accidentally falls into the hands of his wife Ana, who takes it to be an anniversary gift. Both the police and El Danzón are hunting for the jewel and El Danzón ends up attacking Alfonso. During a fight at the nightclub, El Danzón tries to kill Alfonso, and in the end he is himself shot and killed by Blanca Lilia. During the investigation of the crime, the police and Ana finally discover the truth. After a lengthy trial, Blanca Lilia is released. But she does not reveal that she has become pregnant by Alfonso. When Blanca Lilia gives birth to a girl, she decides to visit Ana and hands over the girl, making this sacrifice in the knowledge that she can never be a real mother for the girl now that the shadow of the crime will always remain with her. Alfonso and Ana are reconciled and together they decide to bring up the child, whom they name after her mother. The final destiny of Blanca Lilia is uncertain.

== Cast ==
- Rosa Carmina ... Blanca Lilia / Katya
- Fernando Fernández ... Alfonso
- Miguel Manzano ... El Danzón
- Georgina Barragán ... Ana

== Reviews ==
The story is an adaptation loosely based on The Blue Angel. It revolves around the relationship of a cabaret dancer and a serious married teacher of classical music, and his slow descent through the obsessive love that he feels for her into the corrupt world of the cabaret and the darkness of her world, ending in a robbery and murder.

Unlike the German film, this one turns into a musical and perhaps succeeds better as a melodrama. As was normal in Mexican films of the fifties, the film portrays the devotion of the loyal wife and the triumph of good manners, all interspersed with musical numbers.

With respect to the soundtrack, the Cuban-Mexican rumba dancer Rosa Carmina reported: "Salvador Elizondo (the producer) was very fond of me and said to me: 'Rosita, I was dreaming of you last night. You are la Viajera.' The film has the most attractive, beautiful and precious dance numbers of the Mexican Cinema. Salvador Elizondo pulled out all the stops. The director Alfonso Patiño told me that he had made the plot very similar to his life."
