= Lost Love (1951 film) =

1951 film

- Directed by: Miguel Morayta
- Written by: Guadalupe González; Victor Mora
- Produced by: Gustavo de León; Antonio Nicolay
- Starring: Amalia Aguilar; Víctor Junco; Tito Novaro
- Cinematography: Ezequiel Carrasco
- Edited by: Carlos Savage
- Music by: Jorge Pérez
- Release date: 24 May 1951
- Running time: 101 minutes
- Country: Mexico
- Language: Spanish

Love Love (Spanish: Amor perdido) is a 1951 Mexican musical drama film directed by Miguel Morayta and starring Amalia Aguilar and Víctor Junco. The plot is inspired by the famous bolero of the same name by Pedro Flores. It is in the tradition of Rumberas films. It was shot at the Clasa Studios in Mexico City. The film's sets were designed by the art director Ramón Rodríguez Granada.

== Plot ==
A young rumba dancer named Amalia (Amalia Aguilar), is supported by her friend, a young composer named Ernesto (Tito Novaro) to become a cabaret dancer. She meets and falls in love with the gangster Luis (Victor Junco). She has an accident on her face caused by the jealous lover of Luis, Celia (Yadira Jiménez), and has to wear a maskso she decides to leave without telling anyone. The gangster discovers her dancing in a cabaret and decides to kill her, not knowing the reason for her disappearance.

== Cast ==
- Amalia Aguilar as Amalia
- Yadira Jiménez as Celia
- Víctor Junco as Luis
- Tito Novaro as Ernesto
- José Pulido as Andrés
- Eduardo Alcaraz as Don Paco
- Felipe de Flores as Doctor
- Alfredo Varela padre as Don Matías
- Chel López as Don Pedro
- Enrique Zambrano as El Californiano
- Julia Alonso as Enfermera
- Armando Arriola as Mesero
- Lily Aclemar as Andrea
- Dámaso Pérez Prado as Self
- María Victoria as María Victoria
- María Luisa Landín as Cantante
- Juan Bruno Tarraza as Pianista
