= Juan José Marino =

Mexican film editor (died 2019)

- Died: 24 November 2019
- Occupation: Editor
- Years active: 1931–1984 (film)

Juan José Marino was a Mexican film editor.

== Selected filmography ==
- Luponini from Chicago (1935)
- Beautiful Mexico (1938)
- The Coward (1939)
- Five Minutes of Love (1941)
- Father Morelos (1943)
- Lightning in the South (1943)
- The Museum of Crime (1945)
- Murder in the Studios (1946)
- A Woman of the East (1946)
- Gangster's Kingdom (1948)
- Madam Temptation (1948)
- Juan Charrasqueado (1948)
- Cabaret Shanghai (1950)
- The Guests of the Marquesa (1951)
- The Masked Tiger (1951)
- What Idiots Men Are (1951)
- Good Night, My Love (1951)
- Arrabalera (1951)
- Passionflower (1952)
- The Island of Women (1953)
- The Three Perfect Wives (1953)

== Bibliography ==
- Kim R. Holston. Susan Hayward: Her Films and Life. McFarland, 2002.
