= What Idiots Men Are =

1951 film

- Directed by: Juan Orol
- Written by: José G. Cruz
- Produced by: Arnoldo Orol; Juan Orol
- Starring: Rosa Carmina; Víctor Junco; Aurora Segura
- Cinematography: Domingo Carrillo
- Edited by: Juan José Marino
- Music by: Antonio Rosado
- Production company: España Sono Films
- Release date: 14 June 1951
- Running time: 85 minutes
- Country: Mexico
- Language: Spanish

What Idiots Men Are (Spanish: Que idiotas son los hombres) is a 1951 Mexican drama film directed by Juan Orol and starring Rosa Carmina, Víctor Junco and Aurora Segura. The film's sets were designed by the art director Ramón Rodríguez Granada.

== Synopsis ==
After divorcing her unfaithful husband, the beautiful Olga Villalba arrives in the resort town of Acapulco. The newly-single Olga soon attracts male attention but has to choose between marrying for money or a poorer man she can love.

== Cast ==
- Rosa Carmina as Olga Villalba
- Víctor Junco as Luis
- Aurora Segura as Gloria Loaiza
- José Pulido as Rafael
- Jorge Mondragón as Antonio Melgar
- Juan Pulido as Don Rogelio del Río
- Roberto Corell as Don Juan del Campo
- Tana Lynn as Alicia del Río
- Juanita Riverón as Aurora Melgar
- Carmen Manzano as Zoila del Campo
- Medalia as Cantante
- Marco de Carlo as Carlos
- Ignacio Peón as Juez
- Javier Puente as Sr. Calvillo
- Óscar Ortiz de Pinedo as Julio

== Bibliography ==
- Agrasánchez, Rogelio. Cine Mexicano: Posters from the Golden Age, 1936-1956. Chronicle Books, 2001.
- Paranaguá, Paulo Antonio. Le Cinéma cubain. Centre Georges Pompidou, 1990.
