= Siboney (film) =

- Directed by: Juan Orol
- Written by: Juan Orol
- Produced by: Juan Orol
- Starring: María Antonieta Pons; Juan Orol; Chela Castro
- Cinematography: Ricardo Delgado; Agustín Jiménez
- Music by: Rodrigo Pratts; Ernesto Lecuona
- Distributed by: España Sono Films
- Release date: August 7, 1942 (México)
- Countries: Mexico; Cuba
- Language: Spanish

Siboney is a Mexican-Cuban drama film written and directed by Juan Orol. It was filmed in 1938 and released in 1942, starring María Antonieta Pons and Juan Orol.

== Plot ==
In 1868, while the Cuban War of Independence develops, Gaston de Montero (Juan Orol), a noble Spanish knight, rescues a young girl named Siboney (María Antonieta Pons) and helps her become a successful dancer. Over time, she discovers that she is the daughter of a prominent aristocrat.

== Cast ==
- María Antonieta Pons ... Siboney
- Juan Orol ... Gastón de Montero
- Chela Castro ... Caridad
- Luisa María Morales ... Ligia
- Oscar Lombardo ... Ricardo
- Celina ... Santerian

== Reviews ==
Siboney is the first film by the Spanish director Juan Orol with his second film muse, María Antonieta Pons. With Mexican production, the film was shot in Cuba, inspired by the theme song Siboney of Ernesto Lecuona. For this film were used scenes of the Galician Center of Havana. The motto of this film was a distinct Cuban film. Siboney was considered the first film of the called Rumberas film of the Golden Age of Mexican cinema.
