= Víctor Junco =

Mexican actor

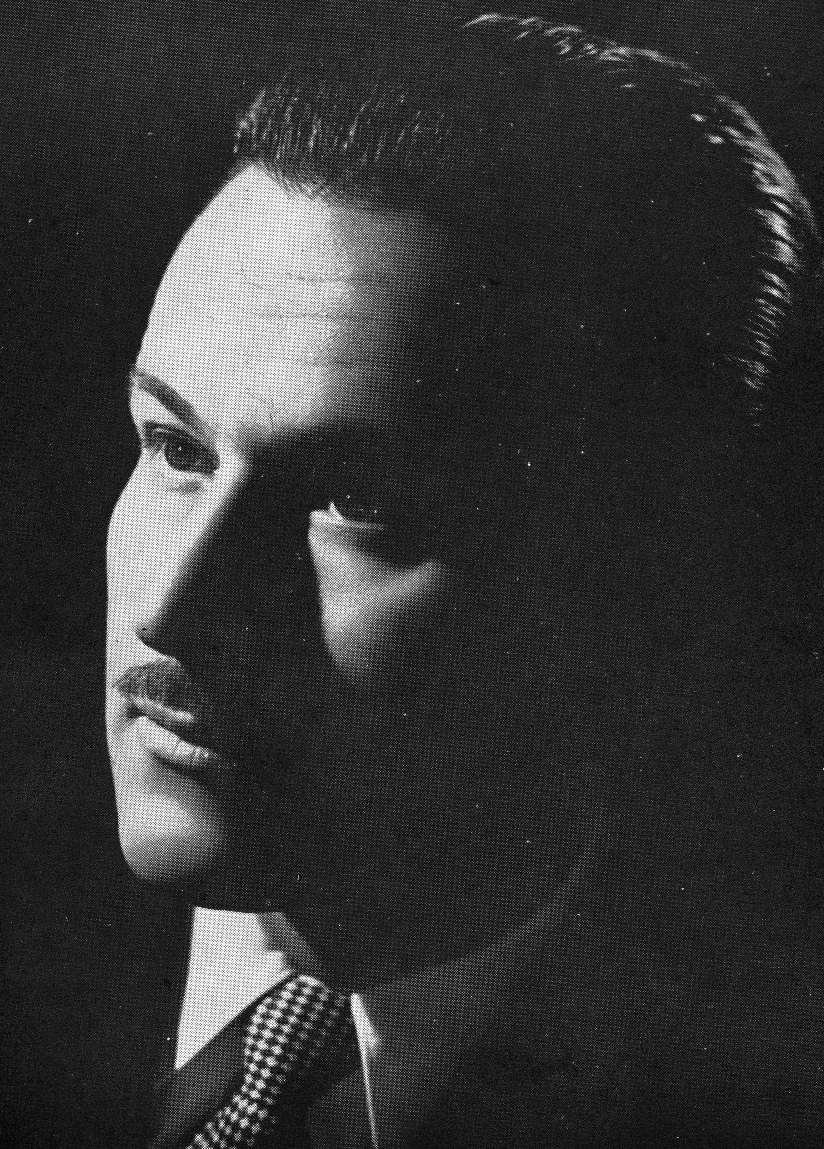
- Junco in 1954
- Born: Víctor Ciriaco Junco Tassinari; 18 June 1917; Gutiérrez Zamora, Veracruz, Mexico
- Died: 6 July 1988 (aged 71); Mexico City, Mexico
- Resting place: Panteón Mausoleos del Ángel
- Other name: Don Víctor Junco
- Education: Heroica Escuela Naval Militar
- Occupation: Actor
- Years active: 1935–1988
- Spouse: Rina Valdarno (divorced)
- Children: 1
- Relatives: Tito Junco (brother)

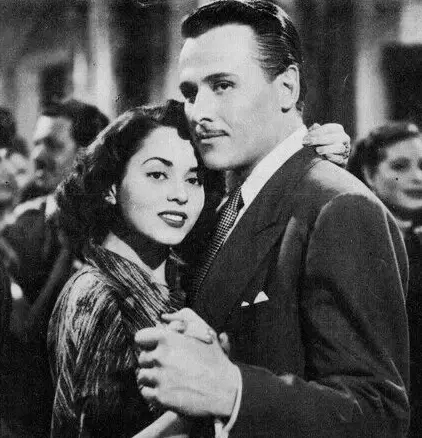
Víctor Junco and Perla Aguiar in The Devil Is a Woman (1950)

Víctor Ciriaco Junco Tassinari (18 June 1917 – 6 July 1988), known professionally as Víctor Junco, was a Mexican actor. He was considered a star of the Golden Age of Mexican cinema. During his career, Junco received two Ariel Award nominations for his supporting performances in La Otra (1946) and Misterio (1980). He won for the latter.

== Selected filmography ==
- Café Concordia (1939)
- Horse for Horse (1939)
- Three Peasants on a Donkey (1939)
- The Two Orphans (1944)
- The Mulatta of Cordoba (1945)
- Caribbean Rose (1946)
- The Private Life of Mark Antony and Cleopatra (1947)
- Nocturne of Love (1948)
- The Well-paid (1948)
- Coquette (1949)
- Witch's Corner (1949)
- The Woman of the Port (1949)
- Love for Love (1950)
- The Devil Is a Woman (1950)
- Wild Love (1950)
- Lost Love (1951)
- What Idiots Men Are (1951)
- Adventure in Rio (1953)
- The Loving Women (1953)
- Madame X (1955)
- Bandido (1956)
- Ash Wednesday (1958)
- The Big Cube (1968)
- La señora Muerte (1969)
