= Madam Temptation =

1948 film

- Directed by: José Díaz Morales
- Written by: Pedro A. Calderón; Guillermo Calderón; José Díaz Morales; Sebastián Gabriel Rovira; Antonio Monsell
- Starring: David Silva; Susana Guízar; Ninón Sevilla
- Cinematography: Ezequiel Carrasco
- Edited by: Juan José Marino
- Music by: Antonio Díaz Conde
- Production company: Producciones Calderón
- Release date: 29 April 1948
- Running time: 83 minutes
- Country: Mexico
- Language: Spanish

Madam Temptation (Spanish: Señora Tentación) is a 1948 Mexican drama film directed and co-written by José Díaz Morales and starring David Silva, Susana Guízar and Ninón Sevilla. It was shot at the Churubusco Studios in Mexico City. The film's sets were designed by the art director Luis Moya.

== Cast ==
- David Silva as Andrés Valle
- Susana Guízar as Blanca Flores
- Ninón Sevilla as Trini
- Hilda Sour as Hortensia, la cancionista
- Jorge Mondragón as Sr. Alberto López
- Fanny Schiller as Lupe, tia de Blanca
- Antonio Bravo as Empresario del cabaret
- Curro Moreno as Ricardo Fábregas
- Julián de Meriche as Agente de policía
- Pascual García Peña as Don Crisóstomo
- Roberto Corell as Invitado
- Chabela Durán as Cantante
- Kiko Mendive as Cantante
- Agustín Lara as Cantante
- Julio Daneri as Doctor
- José Ortega as Hombre en baile
- Joaquín Roche as Hombre en baile
- Pepe Ruiz Vélez as Presentador en el cabaret

== Bibliography ==
- Andrew Grant Wood. Agustin Lara: A Cultural Biography. OUP USA, 2014.
