= Sandra, la mujer de fuego =

- Promotional poster of the film
- Directed by: Juan Orol
- Written by: Felipe Montoya; Juan Orol
- Produced by: Juan Orol
- Starring: Rosa Carmina; César del Campo
- Cinematography: Rosalío Solano
- Music by: Obdulio Morales
- Distributed by: España Sono Films
- Release date: June 9, 1954 (México)
- Countries: Mexico; Cuba
- Language: Spanish

Sandra, la mujer de fuego (Sandra, The Woman of Fire) is a 1954 Mexican-Cuban drama film produced, written and directed by Juan Orol, and starring Rosa Carmina and César del Campo.

== Plot ==
Haunted by her past, the famous cabaret singer Sandra (Rosa Carmina) decides to get away and marries Don Miguel Olazabal (Manuel Arvide), a wealthy landowner. The impossibility of her husband to consummate their marriage causes a burning passion in Sandra, passion aroused in all men around her. Quickly she discovers that she cannot escape her past, because wherever she goes the life of crime she lived in the past continues to haunt her.

== Cast ==
- Rosa Carmina ... Sandra
- Arturo Martínez ... Malo
- César del Campo ... Jorge
- Manuel Arvide ... Don Miguel Olazabal

== Reviews ==
In the delirant Juan Orol's tropical melodrama, the beautiful rumberas are convicted to tragic misfortunes because of men and roam in scenarios populated of wild beaches, untimely storms, swaying palms, and in this case, omnipresent orchids. The woman -here Rosa Carmina, third wife of Juan Orol - wakes burning passions among all the men around her. The Mexican Film historian Emilio García Riera said: "Orol went to Cuba to make this ineffable melodrama of tropical passions in which a narrator describes the fevers of the heroine and her impotent husband. The lush Rosa Carmina tirelessly travels between the palms of Haiti, hiding her sexual dissatisfaction in solitary beds with the open windows while listening the African drums and arouses uncontrollable passions among the laborers of her impotent husband. A clip to store in the memory: the sequence in which Rosa Carmina dance a sensual rumba to a group of laborers feverish, burly, immobilized by the "baroques" charms of the stunning rumbera. The story of the film seems torn from the novel El reino de este mundo, by Alejo Carpentier. The character of Sandra has certain similarities with the character of Floridor. While Floridor recites Racine parliaments to the black slaves in the plantations, Sandra moves to the beat of the drums. The film is part of the classic film saga starring by the characters created by Juan Orol. The saga began in the film El reino de los gángsters (1947), and continued until México de Noche (1974). The film is succeeded by the film El Sindicato del Crimen (Antesala de la muerte) also filmed in 1954.
