= Roberto Corell =

Mexican actor

- Born: 2 October 1906; Barcelona, Catalonia, Spain
- Died: 6 July 1977 (aged 70); Mexico City, Mexico
- Occupation: Actor
- Years active: 1940 - 1975 (film)

Roberto Corell was a Mexican film actor. He appeared in more than eighty films during his career.

== Selected filmography ==
- Narciso's Hard Luck (1940)
- The Unknown Policeman (1941)
- Les Misérables (1943)
- Bugambilia (1945)
- Rosalinda (1945)
- A Day with the Devil (1945)
- I Am a Fugitive (1946)
- The Queen of the Tropics (1946)
- The Associate (1946)
- Symphony of Life (1946)
- Ecija's Seven Children (1947)
- A Gypsy in Jalisco (1947)
- The Secret of Juan Palomo (1947)
- Gangster's Kingdom (1948)
- Los tres huastecos (1948)
- The Magician (1949)
- Over the Waves (1950)
- Cabaret Shanghai (1950)
- My General's Women (1951)
- What Idiots Men Are (1951)
- The Woman You Want (1952)
- Forbidden Fruit (1953)
- The Strange Passenger (1953)
- The Three Elenas (1954)
- Love in the Shadows (1960)

== Bibliography ==
- Rogelio Agrasánchez. Guillermo Calles: A Biography of the Actor and Mexican Cinema Pioneer. McFarland, 2010.
