= Aventura en Río =

1953 film by Alberto Gout Àbrego

- Directed by: Alberto Gout
- Written by: José Carbo; Álvaro Custodio
- Produced by: Guillermo Calderón; Pedro Arturo Calderón
- Starring: Ninón Sevilla; Víctor Junco; Luis Aldás
- Cinematography: Alex Phillips
- Music by: José M. peñaranda Antonio Rosado
- Distributed by: Producciones Calderón S.A.
- Release date: May 2, 1953 (México)
- Running time: 95 min
- Country: Mexico
- Language: Spanglish

Aventura en Río (Adventure in Rio) is a Mexican drama film directed by Alberto Gout, starring Ninón Sevilla and Víctor Junco. It was released in 1953.

== Plot ==
Victim of amnesia, Alicia (Ninón Sevilla) a Mexican woman is forced by an operator to work as a cabaret dancer in Rio de Janeiro. Far from her home in Mexico, her husband and her daughter, the woman lives several adventures and offers a distinct variant of her personality: violent, seductive, aggressive, able to face with courage the most fearsome villains.

== Cast ==
- Ninón Sevilla ... Alicia / Nelly
- Víctor Junco ... Ignacio Pendas
- Luis Aldás ... Piraña
- Anita Blanch ... Julia Galván

== Reviews ==
Last film of the Cuban-Mexican actress and rumbera Ninón Sevilla directed by Alberto Gout, in which the melodrama of cabaret of the Mexican film is set against the background the Brazilian exotic locations. Notable musical numbers, especially the dream in which the three suitors are disputed the love of the star. Ninon Sevilla travels to Brazil, where she was idolized. Her arrival in Rio de Janeiro was front page of every newspaper and her admirers were fed into care and riots in wherever she appeared. For this occasion, the actress learned Portuguese.

According counted Sevilla, when the team was shooting the film in Brazil, had problems with the reflectors. The actress personally appeared before the then President Getúlio Vargas to request his intervention. Such was the prestige of the star in that country, that the president received her in official uniform and facilitated all for the filming of the movie. The newspapers wrote: The Rumba went to Catete.
