= USS Siboney =

Two ships of the United States Navy have been named USS Siboney, after the town of Siboney, Cuba, the site of American landings in the Spanish–American War.

- USS Siboney (ID-2999) was a civilian ship requisitioned in World War I as a troopship and returned to the Ward Line (New York and Cuba Mail Steamship Company) after the war.
- USS Siboney (CVE-112) was an escort carrier in service from 1945 to 1956.
