= Amor salvaje =

- Directed by: Juan Orol
- Written by: José G. Cruz; Juan Orol
- Produced by: Juan Orol
- Starring: Rosa Carmina; Víctor Junco; Dalia Iñiguez
- Cinematography: Domingo Carrillo
- Music by: José M. peñaranda Antonio Rosado
- Distributed by: España Sono Films
- Release date: April 6, 1950 (Mexico)
- Running time: 86 min
- Country: Mexico
- Language: Spanish

Amor salvaje (Wild Love) is a Mexican drama film directed by Juan Orol. It was released in 1950 and starring Rosa Carmina and Víctor Junco.

== Plot ==
Alma Luz (Rosa Carmina) leaves Panama to go live with her aunt Antonia (Dalia Iñiguez) and Manuel (Victor Junco), her husband in Mexico. There she meets Julio (José Pulido), who tries to conquer her, but she rejects him because she is in love with Manuel. Julio to learn the relationship between her and her uncle, faces Manuel causing a tragedy.

== Cast ==
- Rosa Carmina ... Alma Luz
- Víctor Junco ... Manuel
- Dalia Iñiguez ... Antonia
- José Pulido ... Julio
- Wolf Ruvinskis
- Juanita Riverón

== Reviews ==
About this film the Cuban-Mexican actress Rosa Carmina reveals: This film has a very strong argument to something like La Malquerida. An insane love between the niece and the aunt's husband. At that time this was very strong, now we die of laughter. The argument was written by José G. Cruz. We shot a lot with José G. Cruz; he is a person who has the gift to reach out to the people, to the public. He has that magic wand to know what you like and what you dislike. His arguments are classic comics of the popular culture.

In this film Rosa Carmina dances a Joropo that was written for her:

I'm going to Havana and never come back, because Carmina's love will kill me...

Rosa Carmina also revealed: I learned to dance joropo, wearing maracas in my sandals and poured sugar on the floor to set the pace.
