= Alberto Gout =

Mexican screenwriter, producer and film director

- Born: 14 March 1913; Mexico City, Mexico
- Died: 7 July 1966 (aged 53); Mexico City, Mexico
- Occupations: Director, Producer, Writer
- Years active: 1934–1966 (film)

Alberto Gout Ábrego (Note: In this Mexican name, the surname is Gout and the second or maternal family name is Ábrego.) (1913–1966) was a Mexican screenwriter, producer and film director.

== Selected filmography ==
- Su adorable majadero (1938)
- Café Concordia (1939)
- When the Stars Travel (1942)
- Saint Francis of Assisi (1944)
- Smoke in the Eyes (1946)
- The Well-paid (1948)
- The Game Rooster (1948)
- Revenge (1948)
- Courtesan (1948)
- Witch's Corner (1949)
- Aventurera (1950)
- Sensuality (1951)
- In the Flesh (1951)
- I Don't Deny My Past (1952)
- Sacrificed Women (1952)
- Aventura en Río (1953)
- I Want to Live (1953)
- The Rape of the Sabine Women (1962)

== Bibliography ==
- Daniel Biltereyst & Daniela Treveri Gennari. Moralizing Cinema: Film, Catholicism, and Power. Routledge, 2014.
