= Manuel Arvide =

Mexican actor

- Born: Manuel Arvide Rendón; 8 January 1897; Mexico City, Mexico
- Died: 22 January 1969 (aged 72); Mexico
- Occupation: Actor
- Years active: 1917-1969 (film)

Manuel Arvide (1897–1969) was a Mexican film actor.

== Selected filmography ==
- Heads or Tails (1937)
- The Sign of Death (1939)
- Five Minutes of Love (1941)
- Another Dawn (1943)
- El Ametralladora (1943)
- Christopher Columbus (1943)
- Santa (1943)
- The Escape (1944)
- The War of the Pastries (1944)
- Adultery (1945)
- Twilight (1945)
- The Devourer (1946)
- Madman and Vagabond (1946)
- Honeymoon (1947)
- Five Faces of Woman (1947)
- The Three Garcias (1947)
- The Garcias Return (1947)
- Gangster's Kingdom (1948)
- Cabaret Shanghai (1950)
- Beau Ideal (1948)
- What Has That Woman Done to You? (1951)
- In the Palm of Your Hand (1951)
- Good Night, My Love (1951)
- Soledad's Shawl (1952)
- The White Rose (1954)
- Tehuantepec (1954)
- When I Leave (1954)
- The Medallion Crime (1956)
- Here Are the Aguilares! (1957)
- The White Sister (1960)

== Bibliography ==
- Hardy, Phil. The BFI Companion to Crime. A&C Black, 1997.
