= Revenge (1948 film) =

1948 film by Alberto Gout Àbrego

- Directed by: Alberto Gout
- Written by: Pedro A. Calderón; José Díaz Morales; Alberto Gout; Carlos Sampelayo
- Produced by: Guillermo Calderón; Pedro A. Calderón
- Starring: Ninón Sevilla; David Silva; Agustín Lara
- Cinematography: Alex Phillips
- Edited by: Alfredo Rosas Priego
- Music by: Antonio Díaz Conde
- Production company: Cinematográfica Calderón
- Release date: 15 September 1948
- Running time: 86 minutes
- Country: Mexico
- Language: Spanish

Revenge (Spanish: Revancha) is a 1948 Mexican crime film directed by Alberto Gout and starring Ninón Sevilla, David Silva and Agustín Lara. The film's art direction was by José Rodríguez Granada.

== Cast ==
- Ninón Sevilla as Rosa
- David Silva as Rafael
- Agustín Lara as Agustín
- Toña la Negra as Toña
- Pedro Vargas as Cantante
- Lalo Malcolm as Don Alejandro
- Manuel Dondé as Gilberto Acosta
- Miguel Manzano as El Gillet
- Fernando Barthell as Jimmy
- Olga Santiago
- José Muñoz as Don Javier
- Cecilia Leger as Esposa de Baltazar
- Ignacio Peón as Cliente cabaret
- Joaquín Roche as Don Baltazar
- Ángela Rodríguez as Mujer en cabaret

== Bibliography ==
- Andrew Grant Wood. Agustin Lara: A Cultural Biography. OUP USA, 2014.
