= Enrique Riveron =

Enrique Riverón
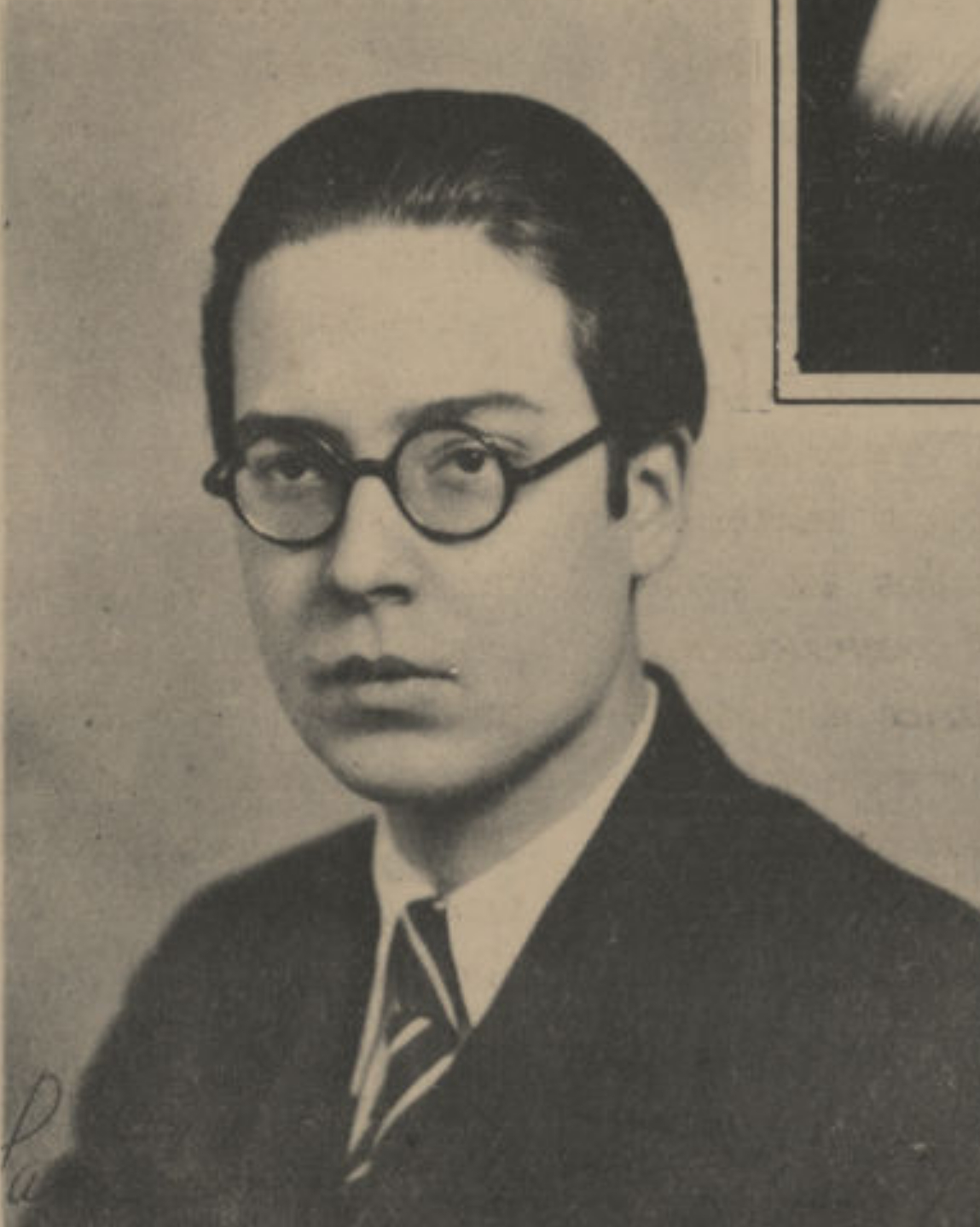
- Born: 1902; Cienfuegos, Cuba
- Died: 1998 (aged 95–96); Coral Gables, Florida, United States
- Education: Real Academia de Bellas Artes de San Fernando
- Occupations: Visual artist, designer, educator
- Employer: Walt Disney Studios
- Known for: Painter, sculptor, cartoonist, illustrator

Enrique Riverón (1902–1998) was a Cuban-born American visual artist, designer, and educator. He worked in painting, sculpture, as a cartoonist, and illustrator.

== Biography ==
Riverón was born in 1902, in Cienfuegos, Cuba. In the 1920s, he traveled to several European countries to study art under scholarship and attended the Academia de San Fernando in Madrid, Spain. His early works were Cubist and abstract. He returned to Cuba in 1927 and moved to the United States in 1937, becoming a U.S. citizen in 1943.

Riverón worked as a cartoonist at Walt Disney Studios. His works were shown in the United States, Latin America, and Europe. Riverón's artworks are held in museum and public collections including at the Miami-Dade Public Library, Wichita Art Museum, the Rice Collection of Cuban Art, and the Ringling Museum of Art.

He died in 1998, in Coral Gables, Florida.
