= Caribbean Enchantment =

1947 film

- Directed by: Juan Orol
- Written by: Egon Eis; Juan Orol
- Produced by: Juan Orol; Octavio Gómez Castro; Geza P. Polaty
- Starring: María Antonieta Pons; Blanquita Amaro; Ramón Armengod
- Cinematography: John Stumar
- Edited by: Geza P. Polaty
- Music by: Julio Brito; Osvaldo Farrés
- Production company: Hispano Continental Films
- Distributed by: Clasa-Mohme
- Release date: October 15, 1947 (México)
- Running time: 125 minutes
- Country: Mexico
- Language: Spanish
- Budget: $70,000

Caribbean Enchantment (Spanish: Embrujo antillano) is a 1947 Mexican musical drama film directed and co-written by Juan Orol and starring María Antonieta Pons, Ramón Armengod and Blanquita Amaro. The film's sets were designed by the art director Martín Domínguez.

== Plot ==
A young girl tired of working in the cultivation of tobacco with her father in Pinar del Rio, Cuba, decides to go to Havana to try her luck, but after several setbacks ends up working in a tobacco factory. In this place, she falls in love with one of the owners of the factory, a young man newly arrived in the country after years of study abroad. But this young man was engaged to the daughter of her partner, and here begins a struggle between the two women, which leads to an unexpected ending.

== Cast ==
- María Antonieta Pons as Caridad
- Ramón Armengod as Ramiro
- Blanquita Amaro as Ana María
- Federico Piñero as Bonifacio
- Alberto Garrido as Bolerito
- Carlos Badías as Ñico
- Sergio Orta as Gordito
- Julio Gallo as Tano
- Caridad Ríos as Mercé
- Fedora Capdevila as Ramona
- Julito Díaz as Secretario
- Kiko Mendive as Musician

== Reviews ==
The film was part of a plan for an American film producer, Geza P. Polaty to take the Cuban rumbera María Antonieta Pons to the market of his country. The crew was bilingual, except for the musicians, including composers like Osvaldo Farrés and Julio Brito, who composed the songs of this film. The film, of dubious artistic quality, was a blockbuster. The film was also the last film collaboration between Juan Orol and his second wife and muse, Maria Antonieta Pons.

The film is also mentioned in the biopic film about Juan Orol, El fantástico mundo de Juan Orol (Sebastian del Amo, 2012).

== Bibliography ==
- Osuna, Alfonso J. García . The Cuban Filmography: 1897 through 2001. McFarland, 2003.
