= The Sign of Death =

1939 film by Chano Urueta

- Directed by: Chano Urueta
- Starring: Mario Moreno «Cantinflas» Manuel Medel; Elena D'Orgaz; Carlos Orellana; Tomás Perrín
- Cinematography: Víctor Herrera
- Edited by: J.M. Noriega
- Music by: Silvestre Revueltas
- Distributed by: CISA
- Release date: December 23, 1939 (Mexico)
- Running time: 90 minutes
- Country: Mexico
- Language: Spanish

The Sign of Death (Spanish: El signo de la muerte) is a 1939 Mexican film directed by Chano Urueta and starring Mario Moreno «Cantinflas» and Carlos Orellana. The film is part of Cantinflas's early starring roles where he teamed up with Manuel Medel.

== Plot ==
The film begins with the following text on the screen:

"And white and bearded men will come from the sea to devastate these kingdoms and the temples will collapse and the immortal gods will sleep until the day that the last descendant of Quetzalcoatl manages to offer to the gods the hearts of four predestined maidens. That day of glory the hearts of white men will dry up and the son of Quetzalcóatl will reign over all his subjects."

— Codex Xilitla

Dr. Gallardo (Carlos Orellana), a notable scientist and director of a museum, knows about the existence of a lost fragment of this codex. His absent-minded assistant (Cantinflas) is in charge of being the museum's guide. A clumsy public library inspector (Medel) is after Cantinflas to return a book that he borrowed some time ago.

According to Dr. Gallardo, the part of the codex that indicates how the sign that indicates who the predestined maidens to be sacrificed is lost. Some thieves mysteriously enter the museum but only steal an ancient ceremonial dagger made of obsidian. After the robbery, and according to the cycle of the full moon, a young white woman is kidnapped. She is taken before the ceremonial altar where an Aztec priest is in possession of the lost part of the codex. The maiden is held by four men and placed on the ceremonial stone, the priest proceeds to sedate her with chloroform. Once asleep, she places a ceremonial gold mask on him and she is sacrificed to Quetzalcoatl.

The next day the woman's body is found and it is determined that she was murdered after her heart was removed. The police have no leads. This case captures the attention of reporter couple Carlos Manzano (Tomás Perrín) and the beautiful Lola Ponce (Elena D'Orgaz). As the days go by, a sorcerer arrives in the city who tells only members of the "fair sex" their destiny. A woman visits this sorcerer to have him guess her future, only for him to be revealed to be the priest, who has the ability to identify the Sign of Death. After leaving, she is kidnapped and in the same way as the first woman she is taken before the priest and ends up being sacrificed to Quetzalcoatl.

After the body of the second victim appears in the same state as the previous one, the police are still even more confused, but Manzano suspects that there is a connection with the Aztec rites and the writings of Dr. Gallardo, starting an entire intrigue to discover who is really behind the murders.

== Cast ==
- Mario Moreno as Cantinflas
- Manuel Medel as Medel
- Elena D'Orgaz as Lola Ponce
- Carlos Orellana as Dr. Gallardo
- Tomás Perrín as Carlos Manzano
- Max Langler as Matlatzin
- Matilde Corell as Aunt Mati
- Elia D'Erzell as Alicia
- Alfonso Parra as Police Chief
- Manuel Arvide as Editor-in-Chief (uncredited)
- Raúl Guerrero as Drunk in Police Station (uncredited)
- Rafael Icardo as Saberman (uncredited)
- Aurora Ruiz como Fortune Teller's Client (uncredited)
- María Luisa Serrano como Tourist (uncredited)

== Release ==
The film premiered on 23 December 1939 on the Alameda cinema. While not citing numbers, Aproximación histórica al cineasta Francisco Elías Riquelme (1890-1977) wrote that the film was such an "economic disaster" (Spanish: descalabro económico) that distributor CISA would not produce any more films.

== Reception ==
One review cited in Aproximación histórica al cineasta Francisco Elías Riquelme (1890-1977) reads that the film's subject matter would be "baleful" (Spanish: tétrico) if not for Cantinflas's "inimitable grace" (Spanish: gracia inimitable). La violencia nuestra de cada día cited the film as one example of Mexican films of the time that addressed gloomy themes with humor, in this film's case human sacrifices. Various analysis have highlighted the scene featuring Cantinflas and Manuel Medel in which their characters are inebriated and Cantinflas performs in drag.
