= La diosa de Tahití =

1953 film by Juan Orol

La diosa de Tahití (Los chacales de la Isla Verde)
- Directed by: Juan Orol
- Written by: Julián Cisneros; Icaro Cisneros
- Produced by: Juan Orol
- Starring: Rosa Carmina; Arturo Martínez; Marco de Carlo
- Cinematography: Rosalío Solano
- Music by: Antonio Rosado
- Distributed by: España Sono Films
- Release date: February 11, 1953 (México)
- Running time: 99 min
- Country: Mexico
- Language: Spanish

La diosa de Tahití (The Goddess of Tahiti) also known as Los chacales de la Isla Verde (The Jackals of Isla Verde), is a Mexican drama film directed by Juan Orol. It was released in 1953 and starring Rosa Carmina and Arturo Martínez.

== Plot ==
Paula (Rosa Carmina), the biggest star of a cabaret located on some exotic island of the South Seas, harbor a fugitive who starts a dangerous adventure that compromises her safety, in a bitter struggle between smugglers and military.

== Cast ==
- Rosa Carmina ... Paula
- Arturo Martínez ... Silvestre
- Marco de Carlo ... Alfredo
- Gilberto González ... Pancho

== Reviews ==
Delirious romantic melodrama directed by Juan Orol, which include the pleasant musical numbers danced by the rumbera Rosa Carmina and the recreation exotic environments in which the filmmaker puts his history.
