= Red Konga =

- Directed by: Alejandro Galindo
- Written by: Alejandro Galindo
- Produced by: Raúl de Anda
- Starring: María Antonieta Pons; Pedro Armendáriz; Carlos López Moctezuma
- Cinematography: Víctor Herrera
- Music by: Pedro Galindo
- Distributed by: Producciones Raúl de Anda
- Release date: October 1, 1943 (México)
- Running time: 110 min.
- Country: Mexico
- Language: Spanish

Red Konga (in Spanish Konga Roja) is a 1943 Mexican drama film directed by Alejandro Galindo, and starring María Antonieta Pons and Pedro Armendáriz.

== Plot ==
The supervisor of a banana packing plant, is the target of a union opponents. While focusing on the defense of union members of his plant and maintain his life goals in his workplace, the supervisor is stolen by a gang of bad guys. His supposed best friend is one of the culprits. His life is further complicated by an affair with a singer in a port tavern.

== Cast ==
- María Antonieta Pons
- Pedro Armendáriz
- Carlos López Moctezuma
- Tito Junco
- Toña la Negra

== Reviews ==
In 1943 the Cuban actress and rumbera María Antonieta Pons had a greater advantage in her budding career by starring in a film with Pedro Armendáriz, a leading figure of the Mexican Cinema. The director was Alejandro Galindo. The actress was fully, having crossed the barrier of the Rumberas, which at that time only put as musical complement in movies. She was considered a good actress, with capacity for melodrama.
