= Rosa Carmina =

Cuban-Mexican actress and dancer

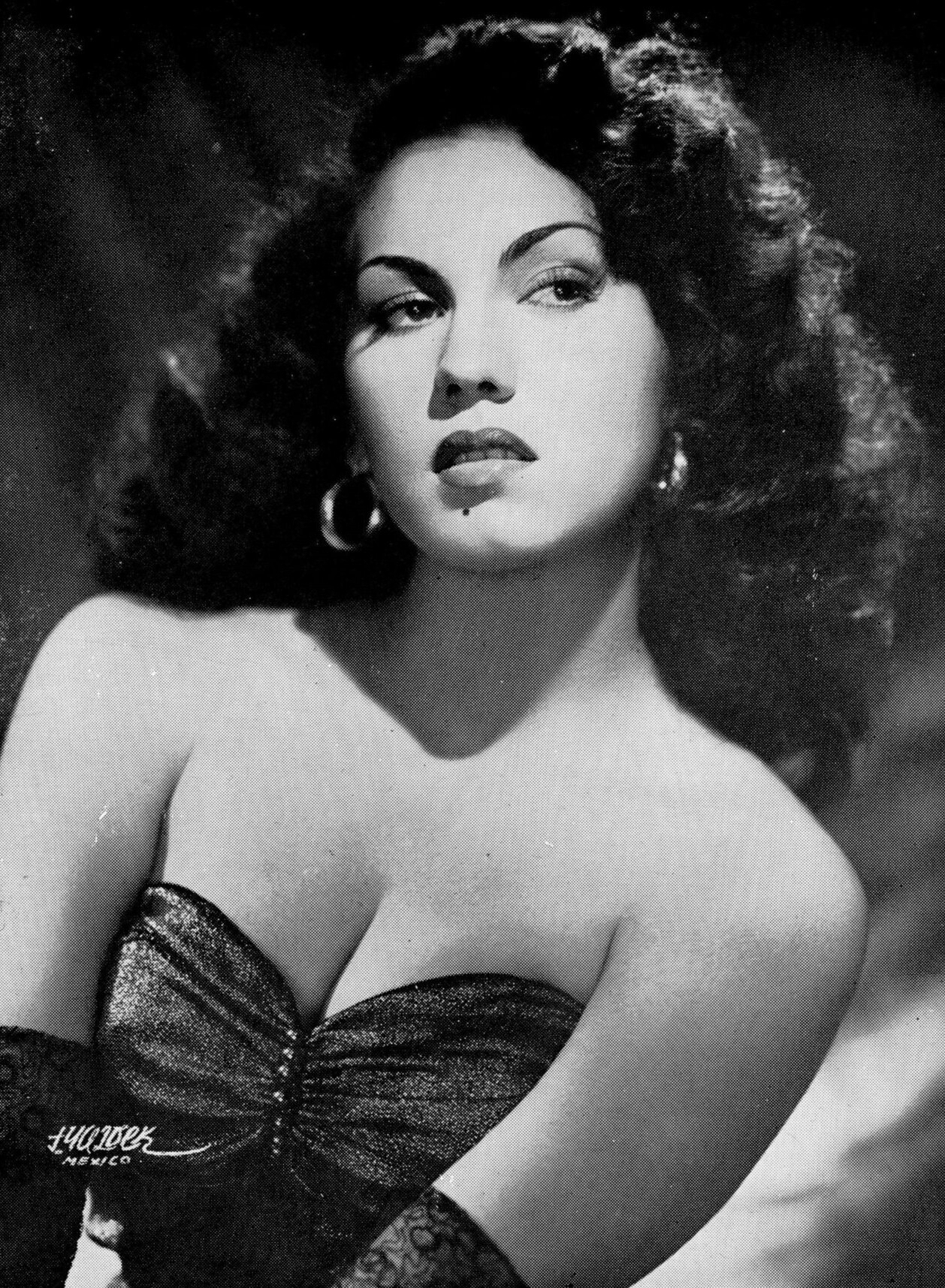
- Rosa Carmina in 1954
- Born: Rosa Carmina Riverón Jiménez; November 19, 1929 (age 96); La Habana, Cuba
- Occupations: Actress, dancer and singer
- Years active: 1946–1992
- Spouse(s): Francisco Morales Llanes; Juan Orol (1949-1954); Ramón de Florez

Rosa Carmina Riverón Jiménez (born November 19, 1929) is a Cuban-Mexican actress and dancer.

She was discovered in Cuba by the Spanish filmmaker Juan Orol, and made her debut in Mexican cinema in Orol's film A Woman from the East in 1946. She quickly achieved great popularity in the Mexico thanks to her talent, demeanor, and unconventional stature (being very tall for actresses of the time). For several years, she was part of the film crew of Juan Orol in his best gangster films. Among these are the classic Gangsters Versus Cowboys (1948), considered one of the best Mexican films and considered a cult film in several film clubs around the world. Additionally, Rosa Carmina was one of the principal stars of the Rumberas film of the Golden Age of Mexican cinema in the 1940s and 1950s. Among her principal Rumberas films are Tania, the Beautiful Wild Girl (1947), Wild Love (1949), In the Flesh (1951), Voyager (1952) and Sandra, the Woman of Fire (1954), among others. In her versatile career, Rosa Carmina has worked in various film genres, as well as theater and television. In the 1980s and 1990s she appeared in some Mexican telenovelas. Thanks to her film collaboration with Orol, she was known as The Queen of the Gangsters of Mexican cinema. She is also known under the name Her Majesty The Rumba.

== Early life ==
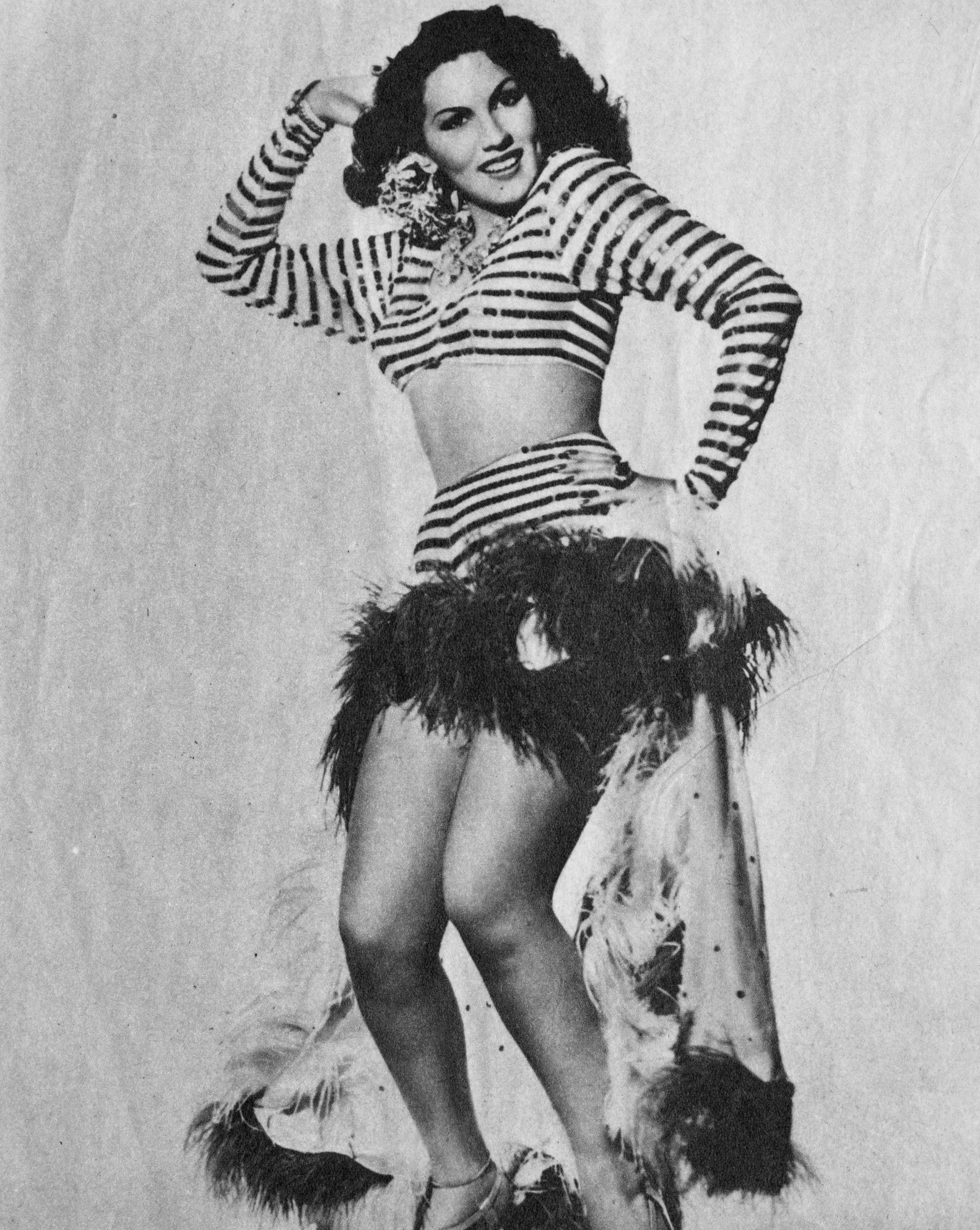
Rosa Carmina in 1951

Rosa Carmina Riverón Jimenez was born in Havana, Cuba on November 19, 1929. Daughter of Juán Bruno Riverón and Encarnacion Jimenez and the youngest of four siblings. From an early age she showed interest in dancing, and studied at the School of Dance in Cuba. In 1946 the famous Spanish producer, director and film actor Juan Orol divorced the Cuban rumbera María Antonieta Pons, ending their film collaboration in the Mexican Cinema. Orol then traveled to Cuba to search for a new star for his films. He launched a competition in Havana where about five hundred girls attended (among the contestants were the future stars Ninón Sevilla and Mary Esquivel). He was unable to find an actress to play the character of a Japanese spy in the film A Woman from the East, so he decided to return to Mexico. However, Orol unexpectedly received a call from Enrique Brion, his agent in Cuba. Brion had come by invitation to the graduation celebration of Juanita Riverón, Rosa's sister, where he heard Rosa Carmina sing. Brion told Orol about his discovery. Upon meeting Rosa the next day, Orol claimed to have felt a great emotion, and thought to himself: She is the Woman from the East.

Orol fell for Rosa and offered her a contract to star in three films in Mexico. She initially rejected the offer, but was eventually convinced by Orol. Rosa decided to travel with him to Mexico accompanied by her family. Juan Orol taught her his best dance moves. Later, he sent for choreographers from Africa. Rosa Carmina also took acting classes at the workshop of master Seki Sano.

== Career ==
=== Films with Juan Orol ===
Rosa Carmina began her artistic career in the Mexican Cinema starring the film A Woman from East (1946), directed by Juan Orol. Rosa had signed a contract to film two more films with Orol. Her second project was Tania, the Beautiful Wild Girl (1947). Her third film made with Orol was Gangster's Kingdom (1947). Both this film and its sequel, Gangsters Versus Cowboys (1948), are now considered cult films in the Gangster film genre, and have an important place in several film libraries around the world. In both films Rosa Carmina plays the femme fatale, the object of the conflict between the male characters in the story, a situation that contributes to elevate to star as one of the most representative sex symbols of the Mexican cinema of the time. In some Orol films the actress played herself. To close the 1940s, Rosa Carmina filmed two more films with Orol: Wild Love (1949) (controversial film based on a story by José G. Cruz, who spoke about a love conflict between a young man and his own uncle) and Cabaret Shangai (1950). Rosa Carmina success in film increases due to her versatility, she soon proved to be a complete vedette, because she not only showed talent for dancing but also singing and acting. In 1951, Rosa Carmina films the trilogy Percal, which consisted of three films: The Poor's Hell, Women Perdition and Men without Soul. This trilogy was based on a popular original comic of José G. Cruz. The success of the comic magazine in the audience was overcome by the film version.

Despite being virtually exclusive star of Orol films and his production company (España Sono Films), he gave her the opportunity to film with other producers. After her filmic collaborations with Producciones Rosas Priego and CLASA Films Mundiales, Rosa Carmina rejoined the Orol film team with The Goddess of Tahiti (1953). In 1954, Juan Orol produced and directed in Cuba Sandra, the Woman of Fire (1954). The movie was one of the most important and memorable blockbusters films by Rosa Carmina and Orol. Rosa Carmina continued her filmic collaborations next to Juan Orol in three more films: Crime Syndicate (1954), Under the Fear Influence (1955) and Dangerous Secretary (1955). In total, between 1946 and 1955, the legendary Orol directed her in sixteen films. Despite the peculiar style of cinema Juan Orol, these films help to enrich the myth of Rosa Carmina and gave her the undisputed title of Queen of the Gangsters of the Mexican Film noir.

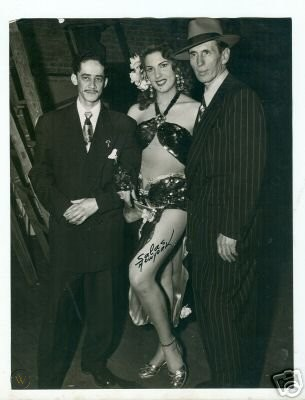
Rosa Carmina, Juan Orol (right) and Gilberto Gonzalez, circa 1950s

=== Films with other filmmakers ===
In 1950, Rosa shot with the production company Producciones Rosas Priego. At this studio, Rosa Carmina had the opportunity to make dramatic films with very different plots: she filmed movies like Treacherous (1950), with Fernando fernández; In the Flesh (1951), with Rubén Rojo; Ladies Specialist (1952), with Rafael Baledón; Voyager (1952), again with Fernandez, and The Second Woman (1954), with Antonio Aguilar, among others. Rosa Carmina was also originally considered to star in the film un extraño en la escalera, directed by the filmmaker Tulio Demicheli, next to Arturo de Córdova. However, Rosa rejected the project to join a new film project with Orol. She was then replaced by Silvia Pinal.

In the mid 1950s, the Rumberas film experienced a decline. Like other exponents of the genre, Rosa Carmina made fewer productions in this genre. In 1956 she filmed the Spanish-Mexican co-production Love Me with Music (1956), directed by Ignacio Iquino. The film was a great success in the Spanish market, making Carmina one of the few Mexican stars to achieve success in Spain. From this point on, Rosa Carmina performed musical numbers only sporadically in her films.

In 1956, Rosa Carmina received an offer to make a film in France with actress Viviane Romance, but because the movie would contain lesbian scenes, Juan Orol recommended that she reject the project. In 1959 she starring the film My Private Secretaries, with the American-Cuban actor Cesar Romero.

In the late 1950s and during the 1960s, Rosa Carmina ventured into other film genres. Carmina's career stands out because of her versatility in working in different genres while keeping the same success with the public. Few actresses in the Mexican cinema were able to do this. She was part of the era of the Luchador films for her involvement in films like The Last Fight (1959) and The White Shadow (1964). She also ventured into the fantasy and horror film genres in films like The Cobra Mystery (1959), Infernal Face (1963) and Macabre Footprint (1963). In 1974, Rosa Carmina met for the last time with Juan Orol in the film México by Night, where they made their last appearance Sandra and the serie of characters created by Orol to his classic films. In 1975, Rosa appeared in the film Beauties by Night, which introduced the Mexican sex comedy that flourished between the 1970s and 1980s in the Mexican Cinema.

In 1976, the Peruvian Nobel Prize winner Mario Vargas Llosa directed her in Captain Pantoja and the Special Services, based on his novel of the same name. Rosa was considered for the role of Chuchupe. Mario Vargas Llosa himself claimed to have inspired her for the character in the novel. However, they realized that Rosa was too physically attractive to play an obese and decadent woman. The character was then performed by Katy Jurado, although a special character was created so that they could keep Rosa Carmina in the cast: La Cubana. The film was produced by Paramount Pictures and made in the Dominican Republic.

In 1981, Rosa appeared in the Arturo Ripstein film Rastro de muerte. Her last film was Teatro Follies, a musical film made for television in 1983, in which she shared credit with María Victoria and Tongolele.

In 1992, Rosa was considered for a role in the film The Years of Greta. However, her physical attractiveness was again an impediment to the realization of the character she was intended to play, so she was replaced by the Mexican actress and rumbera Meche Barba.

=== Stage performances ===
Carmina also performed in arenas, stadiums, cabaret, public theaters and nightclubs around Central and South America, which achieved significant success in an era when the television was not yet considered a mass medium. Her foray into the theater in Mexico occurred shortly after her arrival to the country and after the success of the film Tania, la bella salvaje. Juan Orol organized a tour throughout the country for Rosa Carmina, where he presented her live to the public. Eventually, Rosa entered in a musical revue presented at the Teatro Tívoli (Mexico City) in Mexico City, where she shared scenes with figures like Libertad Lamarque, Rosita Fornés and Los Panchos.

In her live music shows, Rosa Carmina was not limited to the interpretation of Caribbean dances, as dhe experimented with other music genres like rock and roll. To develop these new rhythms, she had the support of the Dominican choreographer Julio Solano, Broadway dancer and former member of the Katherine Dunham Company.

In 1976 she starred in a successful music season in the Blanquita Theater of Mexico City, alongside the comedian Adalberto Martínez and the Cuban rumbera Amalia Aguilar.

In the early 1990s, Rosa Carmina starred in a show called Rumba, poetry and song, which wove the songs of her films with Cuban poetry and dance. One thousand performances were held at the Teatro Esperanza Iris of Mexico City, coinciding with the 45th anniversary of Rosa Carmina's career, under the sponsorship of the National Council for Culture and the Arts, the Secretariat of Public Education and Leon Alazraki Riverón.

=== Television ===
Rosa Carmina has had a very selective presence on Mexican television. She was one of the first figures to present a musical show on Mexican television. At the end of her film career, Rosa made her debut in the Mexican telenovelas in 1984, in the telenovela La pasión de Isabela (1984). Probably her most memorable works in this medium are the telenovelas Juana Iris (1985) and Muchachita (1986), where she played special characters written especially for her by the writer Ricardo Renteria. In 1992 she participated in the telenovela Maria Mercedes (1992), the first of the successful television soap opera trilogy known as the Trilogy of the Marias, starring the singer Thalía. She played a minor character and got her role due to her friendship with the soap opera's writer Carlos Romero. This is, to date, her last professional work as an actress.

Rosa Carmina was initially considered to be part of the cast of the telenovela Marimar. However, Carmina rejected the project and was replaced by Ana Luisa Peluffo.

== Personal life ==
Rosa Carmina has been married several times. Her first husband, Francisco Morales Llanes, was a military and head of the "intelligence" in Cuba during World War II. After, she married Juan Orol. Her third husband was Ramon de Florez. In her fourth and fifth marriage, she married businessmen of Spanish and Lebanese origin, respectively. She resides in Spain.

Such was the impact of her musical numbers from films caused among the public, the audience whistled and clapped to repeat the roll in theaters.

The Mexican painter and sculptor José Luis Cuevas has stated numerous times in the press and on television that he named the Zona Rosa, Mexico City in her honor.

In the biographical film about Juan Orol made by the filmmaker Sebastián del Amo, El fantástico mundo de Juan Orol (2012), Rosa Carmina is played by the Mexican actress Ximena Gonzalez Rubio.

== Filmography ==
- A Woman of the East (1946)
- Tania, the Beautiful Wild Girl (1947)
- Gangster's Kingdom (1948)
- Gangsters Versus Cowboys (1948)
- The Downtown's Cowboy (1948)
- The Bandit (1948)
- Wild Love (1950)
- Cabaret Shanghai (1950)
- Treacherous (1950)
- What Idiots Men Are (1951)
- The Poor's Hell (1951)
- Women Perdition (1951)
- Men without Soul (1951)
- In the Flesh (1951)
- Night of Perdition (1951)
- Beautiful Woman (1952)
- Voyager (1952)
- Ladies Specialist (1952)
- Star Without Light (1953)
- The Second Woman (1953)
- The Goddess of Tahiti (1953)
- Sandra, the Woman of Fire (1954)
- Crime Syndicate (1954)
- The Black Christ (1954)
- Under the Fear Influence (1955)
- Dangerous Secretary (1955)
- Story of a Cheating Husband (1955)
- Love me with Music (1957)
- Unforgettable Melodies (1958)
- Tragic Cabaret (1958)
- My Private Secretaries (1961)
- The Last Fight (1959)
- My Wife needs a Husband (1959)
- The Goose that lays the Golden Eggs (1960)
- How Much is Your Son? (1961)
- Infernal Face (1963)
- The Macabre Footprint (1963)
- The White Shadow (1963)
- Mexico by Night (1974)
- Captain Pantoja and the Special Services (1974)
- Beauties by Night (1975)
- Trail of Death (1981)
- This and the Other with a Single Ticket (1983)
- Follies Theater (1983)

=== TV ===
- La pasión de Isabela (1984)
- Juana Iris (1985)
- Muchachita (1986)
- Morir para vivir (1986)
- Simplemente Maria (1988)
- La Hora Marcada (1990)
- Mi pequeña Soledad (1990)
- María Mercedes (1992)

== Bibliography ==
- Muñoz Castillo, Fernando (1993). Las Reinas del Tropico: María Antonieta Pons, Meche Barba, Amalia Aguilar, Ninón Sevilla & Rosa Carmina. Grupo Azabache. ISBN 968-6084-85-1.
- Las Rumberas del Cine Mexicano (The Rumberas of the Mexican Cinema) (1999). In SOMOS. México: Editorial Televisa, S. A. de C. V.
- Agrasánchez Jr., Rogelio (2001). Bellezas del cine mexicano/Beauties of Mexican Cinema. Archivo Fílmico Agrasánchez. ISBN 968-5077-11-8.
