= Juan Orol =

Mexican-Spanish actor and film director

- Born: Juan Rogelio García García; August 4, 1897; Lalín, Pontevedra, Spain
- Died: May 26, 1988 (aged 90); Mexico City, Mexico
- Years active: 1927–1981
- Spouses: Amparo Moreno (m. 1934; died 1937) María Antonieta Pons (m. 1940; div. 1945) Rosa Carmina (m. 1950; died 1955) Mary Esquivel (m. 1955; div. 1963) Dinorah Judith (m. 1964)
- Children: 1

Juan Rogelio García García (August 4, 1897 – May 26, 1988), better known as Juan Orol, was a Spanish-born Mexican actor, film producer, director and screenwriter. Orol was a pioneer of the Mexican cinema's first talkies and one of the main promoters of the Rumberas film in the Golden Age of Mexican cinema. His films have been described as cult films.

== Biography ==
=== Early life ===
Juan Rogelio García García was born on August 4, 1897, in the parish of Santiso, in the town of Lalin in Pontevedra, Spain. His father was a commander of the Spanish armed forces. His mother, a woman of peasant origin, was a single mother. Later, she married a man who didn't want to take care of another man's son, so she sent Orol to Cuba to live with a friend.

In Cuba, Orol lived in the low neighborhoods, known in Cuba as "solares". There, he had a lot of contact with people of African origin, who taught him all his dance techniques. Young Orol had many occupations at the same time: boxer, mechanic, racing driver, journalist, actor, bullfighter and police officer. He abandoned boxing when his face was disfigured. In his racer role, was about to drive in Indianapolis, but he lacked a few tenths to the mark of 118 miles per hour. In his role as a bullfighter, he passed through South America under the name of Espartero or Esparterito. Later, he moved to Mexico, where he was also part of the secret police. His biography is absolutely bizarre, full of impossible and unconnected episodes. But despite his poor cultural training, he survived. His steps in the bullfight arena and the police order were a great inspiration for subsequent film work. His premature widowhood put on face with a parental responsibility. He started working on the radio as artistic director and publicist while he contacting with the nascent Mexican film industry.

=== Career ===
Initially Orol entered the Mexican film industry as another way to make a living, but eventually he developed a passion for the world of cinema. Orol debuted in the Cinema of Mexico as a supporting actor in the film Sagrario (1933), made by the newly created Aspa Films under the direction of Ramón Peon, also known as the Cuban Griffith. The following year, Orol risked his own capital and premiered simultaneously as producer, writer and star in the film Mujeres sin alma, also directed by Peon. He debuted as director in the film Dear Mother (1935), the third production of Aspa Films. Orol was a devotee of American Film noir, and had a great admiration for the famous film gangsters of the 1930s and 1940s: Edward G. Robinson, James Cagney and Humphrey Bogart. However, Orol himself recognized José Bohr, one of the pioneers of talkies in Mexico, as the most influential filmmaker.

After his first film made modest earnings, he filmed a second film in 1934, where he served as co-director with Ramon Peon: Women without Soul: Supreme Vengeance, which was an unexpected success and starred his first filmic muse, Consuelo Moreno. Orol's films developed a signature style, with the recurring themes of the tropics, the rumberas, exotic landscapes, beautiful and provocative women and the cabaret as an ideal location. These hooks allowed Orol to attract an audience to his films. He later introduced gangsters to his repertoire. On many occasions, to outwit the film unions of Mexico, he invented co-productions with other countries, primarily with Cuba.

In the mid-forties, he consolidated his own production house, España Sono Films. Likewise, he created in Cuba the Caribe Films production company, helping him to make his co-productions with the island. Orol filmed in different countries: Mexico, Cuba, Puerto Rico, the United States, and Spain. Juan Orol had also a "one man band" performance in movies. In most of them, he participated in more than two or three of the main activities of the film: production manager, director, producer, screenwriter and actor.

The first Orol production in the Cuban cinema was Siboney (1938), which features music by Ernesto Lecuona. Orol acted as director, producer, screenwriter and actor. In this film, the Cuban rumbera María Antonieta Pons, his second filmic muse, debuted.

With María Antonieta Pons, Orol made films like Cruel Destiny (1944), The Secrets of the Underworld (1945), Caribbean Bewitch (1946) and Stormy Passions (1947). Although Pons and other of his subsequent filmic muses were exclusive stars of España Sono Films, Orol allowed them to work with other production houses. Pons was the first major rumbera of the Mexican Cinema. Because of this, Orol was considered one of the main promoters of the Rumberas film of the forties and fifties. After his break with Pons, Orol made the film The Love of my Bohío (1946), starring the Costa Rican actress Yadira Jimenez in the lead role. However, Jimenez failed to develop a relevant film relationship with Orol. In search of a new female star of his films, Orol moved to Cuba, where he discovered what would be his next filmic muse: Rosa Carmina.

Rosa Carmina debuted in the film A Woman from the East (1946). She became the most representative and prolific filmic muse of Orol. Both filmed together sixteen films between 1946 and 1955. Probably the most notable are the classic Gangsters Versus Cowboys (considered today as a Cult film) and Sandra, The Woman of Fire. Other relevant films of Orol with Rosa Carmina are Tania, the Beautiful Wild Girl (1948), Wild Love (1949) the trilogy Percal (1951) (based on a comic book by José G. Cruz); The Goddess of Tahití (1953) and Dangerous Secretary (1955).

After separating from Rosa Carmina, Orol filmed The Lame Waitress of the Cafe of the Port, a Cuban-Mexican production, as director, producer and screenwriter, with Marta Rams and Julio Capote as main actors. In the same year, Orol was introduced to his next filmic muse: Mary Esquivel. Esquivel debuted in the film Zonga, The Diabolic Angel (1956), a film that was also the first movie Orol filmed in color. His last major production involving Esquivel was Tahimí, The Daughter of the Fisherman (1958).

Eventually, Orol met his last filmic muse, Dinorah Judith, with whom he directed his last films. At this time, the films of Orol were panned by critics, and reputedly, the director went through a deep depression. His films during this period include The Curse of my Race (1964), Prelude to the Electric Chair (1966) and the cult classic The Fantastic World of the Hippies (1970), made with American co-production. His last film as director was The Death Train (1978). The last appearance of Juan Orol on the big screen as an actor was in the film Ni modo...así somos (1981). He made a cameo as himself, in a brief scene lasting under a minute.

In his later years Orol lived in a deep depression. Despite various film tributes in his honor, he lived in a deep poverty. He assumed that his film collection had succumbed to the fire at the National Film Archives of Mexico (Cineteca Nacional) in 1982. In fact, only some original negatives of his early films were lost in that incident.

He died of liver disease in Mexico City on May 26, 1988.

== Personal life ==
Juan Orol was famous for introducing numerous foreign actresses (mostly Cuban) to the Mexican Cinema. His first wife was Amparo Moreno, sister of the actress Consuelo Moreno, his first filmic muse. With her, he fathered his only child, Arnoldo Orol Moreno, who between the late 1940s and early 1950s, served as executive producer of three of Orol's films. Arnoldo died in a workplace accident on a film set. Amparo died by tuberculosis in 1937.

In 1938, he met the rumbera María Antonieta Pons in Cuba. Orol and Pons became a dancing couple, and he decided to introduce her as an actress in Mexico in the film Siboney (1938). Orol and Pons were married between 1940 and 1945. After divorcing Pons, Orol decided to launch the Costa Rican actress and dancer Yadira Jimenez. However, their collaboration was fleeting. In Cuba, Orol discovered Rosa Carmina, his next filmic muse. Orol and Rosa Carmina were married between 1950 and 1955. Rosa Carmina is considered the most representative of his filmic muses. Later, Orol married the Cuban actress Mary Esquivel. They were married between 1955 and 1963. After Rosa Carmina, a friend introduced him to his niece, Dinorah Judith. Judith was his last muse and last wife, remaining married to her until his death.

== Legacy ==
Juan Orol was a "one man band" in his movies. In most of them, he participated in more than two or three of the main activities of the film: production manager, director, producer, writer or actor. He was a man who felt he should participate in and supervise everything. Despite this, he was not a sophisticated technician, unlike his friend Ramon Peon. Orol did things because of his drive and his passion for the films without taking much time in his studio. He did not try to explain the psychology of his characters and the geography of the locations that he used. For him it was enough that there were scenes and characters. However, his films proved successful and managed to reach the public taste. Not surprisingly, Orol boasted that he was The director of the crowds.

Juan Orol has been compared with American filmmaker Ed Wood, canonized as "the worst director of all time". However, unlike the American filmmaker, Orol did not need a posthumous tribute to be recognized. He earned box office success in his time, the public admired his filmic muses and his evil gangsters, no matter the plot and technical poverty of his productions. He ignored criticism of his work, like with I Hate You and I Love You (1957), a film that the critics directly called "very bad". He even had the luxury of doing remakes of his own work: he made a new version of Dear Mother, his biggest hit, in 1950. Ed Wood, meanwhile, never hit the mainstream. His works were a succession of failures with limited exhibitions, and he only made a fifth of the number of films that Orol made. But both share the precariousness of their mode of production, and today are considered "cult directors".

Orol stretched his film's budgets and was known as a director of one shot. He did not use special effects in his works. In Gangsters Versus Cowboys virtually all the armed men died, but none shed a drop of blood. The film director Sergio Véjar, camera operator of Zonga, The Diabolic Angel (1957), says that Orol ordered Mary Esquivel to paint each of her nails a different color to extend her hands to the camera, thus reducing production costs. Likewise, he did not go in search of exotic locations, although his plots required them in most cases. In Los misterios del hampa(1944), whose screenplay was set in Chicago, a bus in the background reads "Cozumel Peralvillo-Line", a typical line of trucks of Mexico City. In Zonga..., a film that takes place in the Amazon rainforest, there is in the background a monument to Bolivar from the Bosque de Chapultepec in Mexico City. Juan Orol did not care about details.

Juan Orol is also regarded as the spiritual father of the called Rumberas film for having the laid the foundations that enriched the film genre. Also, he is known for having imported to the Mexican Cinema two of the biggest stars of the genre: María Antonieta Pons and Rosa Carmina.

In 2012, Juan Orol was the subject of the biopic El fantástico mundo de Juan Orol, directed by Sebastian del Amo. Orol is played by the Mexican actor Roberto Sosa. The film is based on real events, but freely interpreted by the authors.

== Select filmography ==
=== Director ===
- Dear Mother (1935)
- Women without Soul: A supreme vengeance (1935)
- You Honor Your Parents (1936)
- Siboney (1938)
- Cruel Destiny (1944)
- The Secrets of the Underworld (1945)
- Stormy Passions (Pasiones tormentosas) (1946)
- The Love of my Bohío (1946)
- A Woman of the East (1946)
- Tania, the Beautiful Wild Girl (1947)
- Gangster's Kingdom (1947)
- Caribbean Enchantment (1947)
- Gangsters Versus Cowboys (1948)
- The Underworld Cowboy (1948)
- Wild Love (1949)
- Cabaret Shanghai (1950)
- The Hell of the Poor (1951)
- Bane of Women (1951)
- Men without Soul (1951)
- What Idiots Men Are (1951)
- The Goddess of Tahiti (The Jackals of the Isla Verde) (1952)
- Sandra, The Woman of Fire (1953)
- Crime Syndicate (Prelude to the Death (1954)
- Under the Fear Influence (Gangsters in the Sport) (1955)
- Dangerous Secretary (International Agent) (1955)
- The Lame Waitress of the Cafe of the Port (1957)
- I Hate You and I Love You (1957)
- Zonga, The Diabolic Angel (1957)
- Treacherous Deadlines (1958)
- The Turtledove of the Ajusco (1960)
- Tahimi, the Daughter of the Fisherman (1961)
- Blood on the Gully (1961)
- Under The Cloak of The Night (1962)
- The Curse of my Race (1962)
- Prelude to the Electric Chair (1967)
- La Virgen de la Calle (1967)
- Story of a Gangster (1968)
- Pasiones infernales (1969)
- The Fantastic World of The Hippies (1972)
- Death Train (1979)

=== Actor ===
- Sagrario (1933)
- Siboney (1938)
- A Woman of the East (1946)
- Gangster's Kingdom (1947)
- Gangsters Versus Cowboys (1947)
- Crime Syndicate (1954)
- Under The Fear Influence (1955)
- Treacherous Deadlines (1958)
- Story of a Gangster (1968)
- México by Night (1974)
- Adriana del Río, actress (1979)
- Ni modo, Así somos (1981)

== See also ==
- María Antonieta Pons
- Rosa Carmina
- Rumberas film
- Ed Wood

== Bibliography ==
- Muñoz Castillo, Fernando (1993). Las Reinas del Tropico: María Antonieta Pons, Meche Barba, Amalia Aguilar, Ninón Sevilla & Rosa Carmina. Grupo Azabache. ISBN 968-6084-85-1.
- De la Vega Alfaro, Eduardo (1997). Juan Orol. Universidad de Guadalajara (CIEC). ISBN 968-6084-85-1.
- Las Rumberas del Cine Mexicano (The Rumberas of the Mexican Cinema) (1999). In SOMOS. México: Editorial Televisa, S. A. de C. V.
- Ciuk., Perla (2000). Dictionary of Mexican Film Directors. Consejo Nacional para la Cultura y las Artes (CONACULTA) / Cineteca Nacional. ISBN 970-18-5590-6.
