= Gangsters Versus Cowboys =

- Directed by: Juan Orol
- Written by: Juan Orol
- Produced by: Juan Orol; Luis G. Rubín
- Starring: Juan Orol; Rosa Carmina; José Pulído; Roberto Cañedo
- Cinematography: Domingo Carrillo
- Music by: Antonio Rosado
- Distributed by: España Sono Films
- Release date: April 28, 1948
- Running time: 79 minutes
- Country: Mexico
- Language: Spanish

Gangsters Versus Cowboys (Spanish: Gangsters contra charros) is a 1948 Mexican gangster film written, directed by, and starring Juan Orol, and featuring Rosa Carmina and José Pulído. It was made as a sequel to Orol's Gangster's Kingdom. However, it has become a cult film due to its low-budget production values and idiosyncratic style.

== Plot ==
Gangster Johnny Carmenta (Juan Orol), faces Pancho Dominguez El Charro del Arrabal (Jose Pulido), who has imposed his law in the town. The Rumbera Rosa (Rosa Carmina) seduces both men firing their rivalry.

== Cast ==
- Juan Orol as Johnny Carmenta
- Rosa Carmina as Rosa
- José Pulído as Pancho Domínguez El Charro del Arrabal
- Roberto Cañedo as Julio
- Florencio Castelló

== Legacy ==
The film has sometimes been compared with the work of American filmmaker Ed Wood, known as "the worst director of all time". However, in contrast to Wood's films, Gangsters Versus Cowboys was successful at the box office. Orol's films were popular, despite their technical deficiencies.

According to the opinion of specialist critics of Mexican cinema, the film ranks as number 68 among the hundred best films of the Mexican cinema.

== Bibliography ==
- Daniel Balderston, Mike Gonzalez & Ana M. Lopez. Encyclopedia of Contemporary Latin American and Caribbean Cultures. Routledge, 2002.
