= Golden Age of Mexican Cinema =

Period in Mexican cinema history

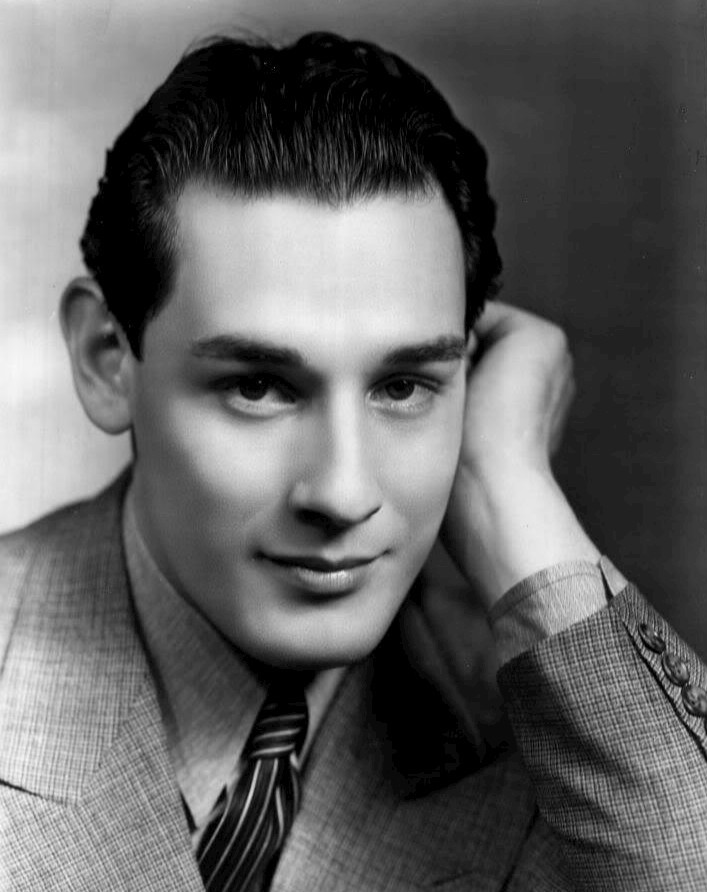
Tito Guízar

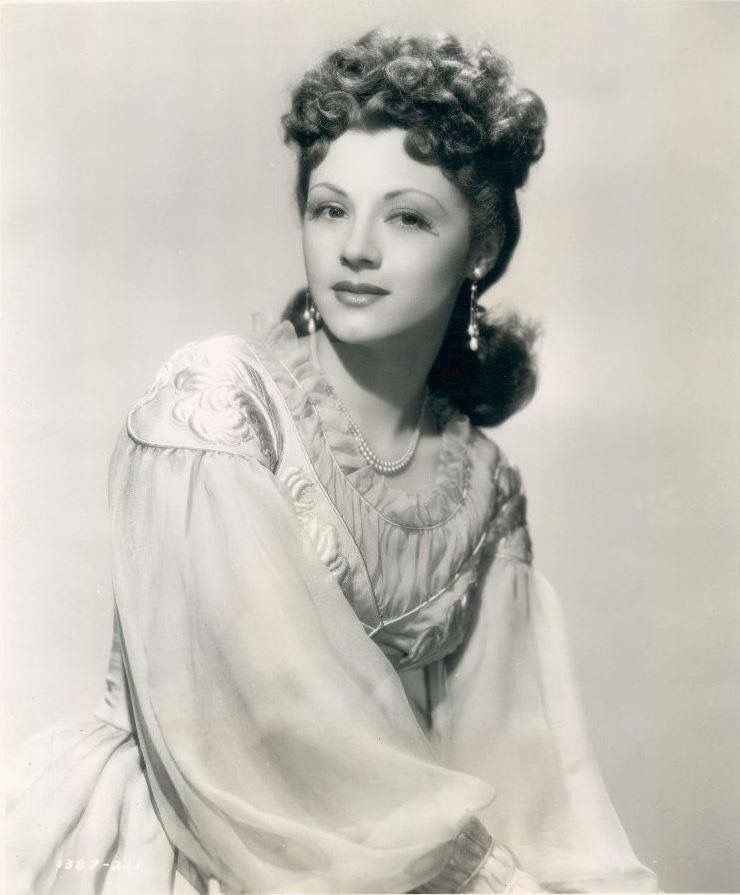
Esther Fernández

Protagonists of Allá en el Rancho Grande (1936), film considered to be the first of the Golden Age of Mexican Cinema.

The Golden Age of Mexican Cinema (Spanish: Época de Oro del Cine Mexicano) was a boom period in the history of Mexican cinema, which began in 1936 with the premiere of the film Allá en el Rancho Grande, and culminated in 1956.

In 1939, during World War II, the film industry in the US and Europe declined, because the materials previously destined for film production now were for the new arms industry. Many countries began to focus on making films about war, leaving an opportunity for Mexico to produce commercial films for the Mexican and Latin American markets. This cultural environment favored the emergence of a new generation of directors and actors still considered icons in Mexico and in other Hispanic countries.

Mexican cinema of the Golden Age is also credited with propelling Norteño music into Chilean popular culture.

== Origins ==
Since the beginning of sound films in Mexico, films such as Santa (1932), directed by Antonio Moreno and The Woman of the Port (1934), directed by Arcady Boytler, were blockbusters that showed that Mexico had the equipment and talent needed to sustain a strong film industry.

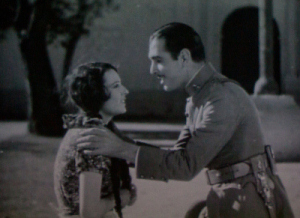
Lupita Tovar and Donald Reed in Santa (1932)

One of the first blockbusters was the film Allá en el Rancho Grande (1936) by Fernando de Fuentes, which became the first classic of Mexican cinema; this film is referred to as the initiator of the "Mexican film industry".

Starting in 1939, Europe and the United States participated in World War II. The film industries of these regions were severely affected: Europe due to its location and the United States because the materials used to produce films (such as cellulose) became scarce and were rationed. In May 1942, after German submarines began attacking Mexican ships, Mexico joined the Allies in the war against Nazi Germany. Mexico won the status of most favored nation. Thus, the Mexican film industry found new sources of materials and equipment and secured its position in the production of quality films worldwide. During World War II, the film industry in France, Italy, Spain, and the United States focused on making war films, which made it possible for the Mexican film industry, with much more versatile themes in its films, to become dominant in the markets of Mexico and Latin America.

In 1939, Argentine cinema—then in the midst of its own Golden Age—overtook Mexican cinema as Latin America's leading producer. However, Argentina's neutrality during World War II prompted the United States to impose a film stock boycott on the country, which in turn boosted the Mexican film industry. As a result, the Argentine film industry collapsed in 1942, while its Mexican counterpart grew exponentially and established itself as the region's unparalleled dominant studio system.

Beginning in the early 1940s, the emergence of great Mexican film studios settled in Mexico City and began to support the mass production of films. Among the most important are CLASA Films, FILMEX, Films Mundiales, Cinematográfica Calderón, Películas Rodriguez and Producciones Mier y Brooks.

Mexican cinema continued to produce high-quality films and began to explore other genres such as comedy, romance and musical. Wild Flower (1943) brought together a team comprising the filmmaker Emilio Fernández, photographer Gabriel Figueroa, actor Pedro Armendariz actress Dolores del Río. The films María Candelaria (1943) and The Pearl (1947) were considered pivotal works by Fernández and his team, and gave Mexican cinema enormous prestige, with their works being shown worldwide in major film festivals. María Candelaria was awarded in 1946 with the Golden Palm at Cannes Film Festival. The Pearl was the first Spanish-language film to be awarded a Golden Globe.

== Cinematographic genres ==
=== Comedy ===
Many comedians achieved recognition in Mexican cinema. From comic slapstick couples (in the style of Laurel and Hardy) to independent actors who achieved a huge poster, many of these comedians emerged from the "Carpas", or Mexican popular theaters. Joaquín Pardavé, was a popular actor who captivated with the same dramatic or comic characters. Pardavé was also a composer and film director, and his beginnings in the industry from silent films made him a "symbolic father" of all Mexican comedians from the Thirties to the Sixties.

Antonio Espino y Mora, better known as "Clavillazo", was another Mexican actor who began his career in the Carpas. More than 30 films are in his repertoire and he is one of the most beloved and remembered artists. Another artist who started in the Carpas and was noted for his picturesque way of dancing was Adalberto Martínez "Resortes", who had a long career, then worked for over 70 years in film and television.

Gaspar Henaine and Marco Antonio Campos, better known as "Viruta and Capulina", were a comic duo who were found in the form of white humor win the affection of the people. Viruta and Capulina began their career together in 1952, although individually had worked on other projects. They filmed more than 25 films.

Although they do not have a large number of films together, Manuel Palacios "Manolín" and Estanislao Shilinsky Bachanska are remembered for their great chemistry in the theaters and later in the films.

=== Musical and Rumberas films ===
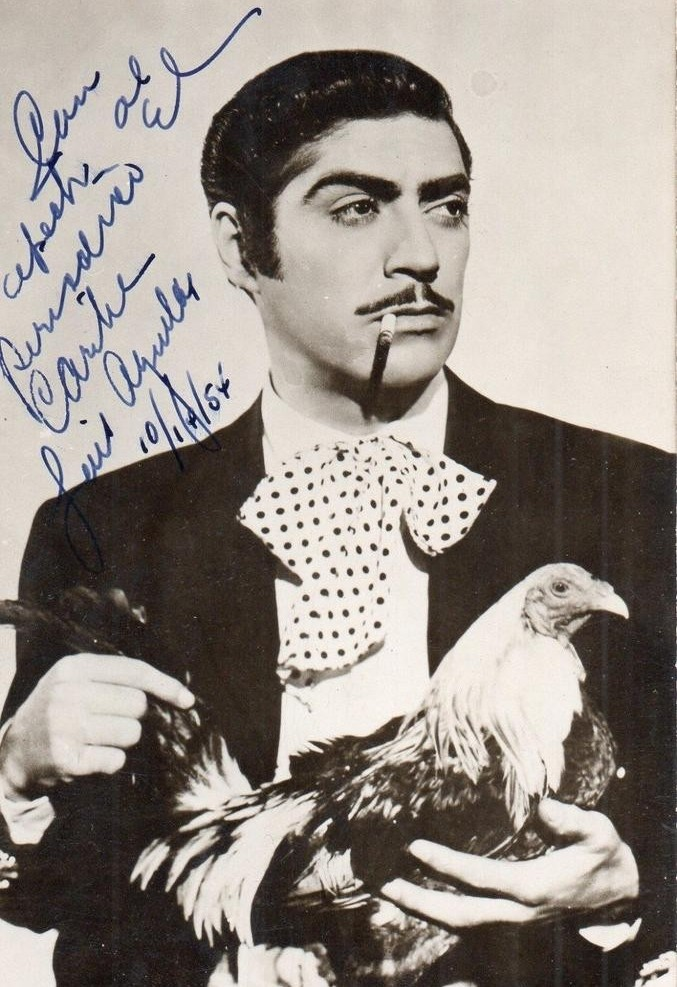
Luis Aguilar, a popular figure in the musical film genre of this era

The musical film genre in Mexico was strongly influenced by the Mexican folk music or Ranchero music. Stars as Pedro Infante, Jorge Negrete, Luis Aguilar and Antonio Aguilar made dozens of musical films that served as a platform to promote Mexican music. The songs of important composers like Agustín Lara or José Alfredo Jiménez served as the basis for the arguments of many films. Libertad Lamarque also highlighted by her performances where music and songs were the main protagonists.

Tropical music that was popular in Mexico and Latin America since the 1930s was also reflected in Mexican cinema. Numerous music magazines were made in the 1940s and 1950s. In these productions it was common to see figures such as Damaso Perez Prado, Toña la Negra, Rita Montaner, María Victoria or Los Panchos. However, the musical film in Mexico was mostly represented by the so-called Rumberas film, a unique cinematic curiosity of Mexico, dedicated to the exaltation of the figure of the "rumba" (dancers of Afro-Antillean rhythms). The main figures of this genre were Cubans María Antonieta Pons, Amalia Aguilar, Ninón Sevilla and Rosa Carmina and Mexican Meche Barba. Between 1938 and 1965, more than one hundred Rumberas films were made.

=== Film noir ===
In Mexico, the film noir genre popular in Hollywood in the 1930s and 1940s was represented by the actor and director Juan Orol. Inspired by popular Gangster films and figures such as Humphrey Bogart and Edward G. Robinson, Orol created a filmic universe and a particular style by mixing elements of classic film noir with Mexican folklore, urban environments, cabaret, and tropical music. Examples include the classic film Gangsters Versus Cowboys (1948).

=== Horror films ===
Although the 1960s are considered the Golden Age of Horror and science fiction in Mexican cinema, during the Golden Age there were some remarkable works. Chano Urueta, a prolific director who began in the silent era, had his approaches with the supernatural in The Sign of Death (1939); however his greatest contributions come with The Magnificent Beast (1952), the film that first introduced wrestlers to the genre. Other works in the genre include La Bruja (1954), and Ladrón de Cadáveres (1956).

== Decline ==
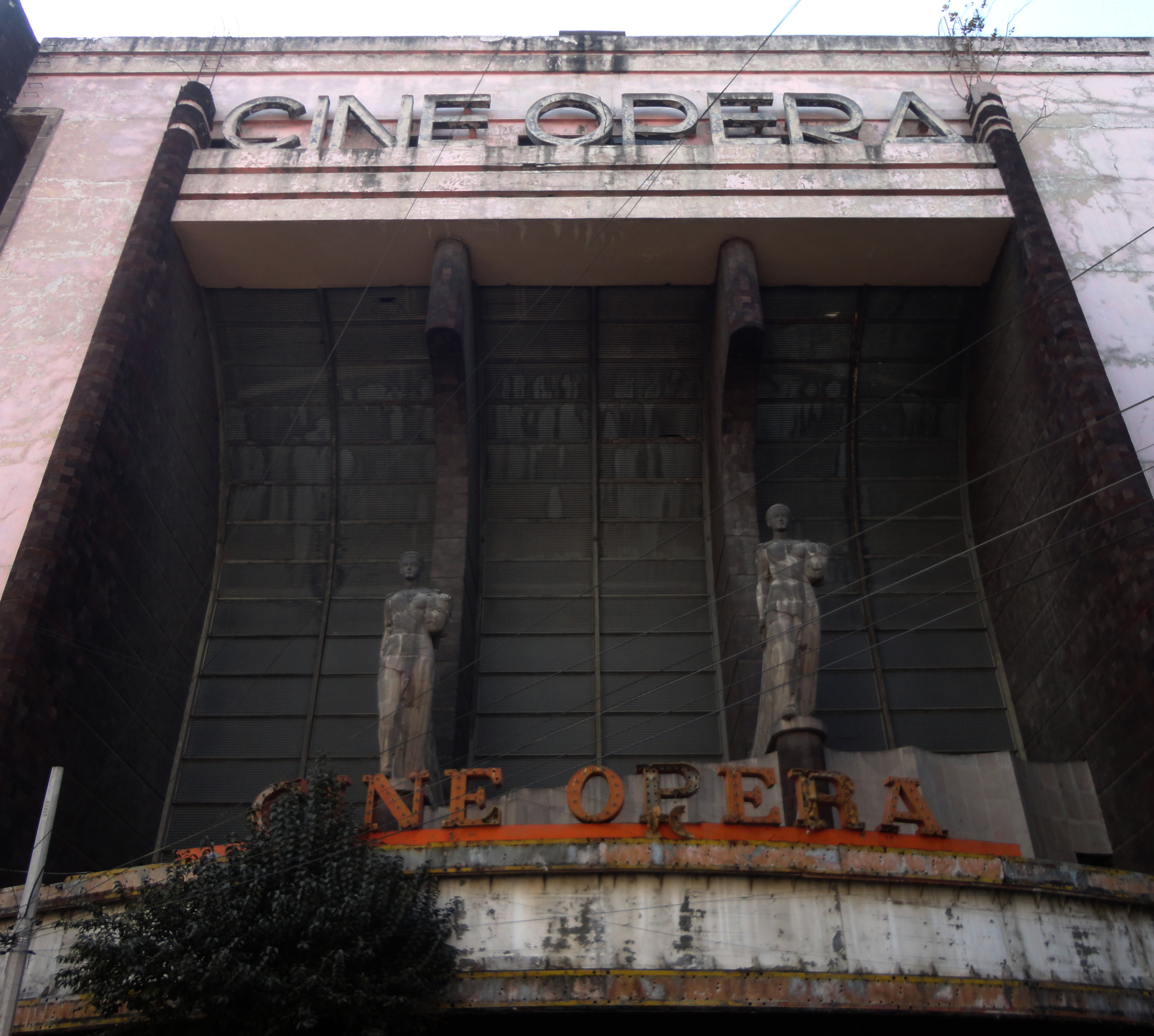
Cine Ópera was one of the most important movie theaters during the Golden Age of Mexican Cinema from its inauguration in 1949 until its closure in 1998. This photograph, taken in 2020, shows its weathered façade.

On April 15, 1957, the whole country mourned with the news of the death of Pedro Infante. His death was one of the markers of the end of the Golden Age of Mexican Cinema.

The first Mexican television transmissions started in 1950. By 1956, TV antennas were common in Mexican homes, and new media grew rapidly in the country outside the capital city. Despite the first black and white television pictures not having the clarity and sharpness of movie films, filmmakers immediately felt sharp competition from this new media, not only in Mexico but throughout the world. The competition forced the film industry to seek new ways to showcase its art, and in the treatment of subjects and genres.

Technical innovations came from Hollywood. Wide screens, three-dimensional cinema, color improvement and stereo sound were some of the innovations introduced by American cinema during the early 1950s. At the time, the high cost of these technologies made it difficult for Mexico to compete; therefore, not for some years was it able to produce films incorporating these innovations.

One of the nations where Mexican cinema was most popular was Yugoslavia, where for much of the 1950s, Mexican films comprised the majority of the films that were screened. The 1950 film Un día de vida, which premiered in 1952 in Yugoslavia, was one of the most popular films of the decade in that nation. The popularity of Mexican films led to the so-called Yu-Mex craze, as Mexican music and fashions were much imitated in Yugoslavia in the 1950s.

The world was changing and so was the way film was produced by other countries. The elimination of censorship in the United States allowed a more bold and realistic treatment of many topics. In France, a young generation of filmmakers educated in film criticism began the New Wave movement. In Italy, the neorealism had claimed the careers of several filmmakers. The Swedish film with Ingmar Bergman made its appearance, while in Japan Akira Kurosawa appeared.

Meanwhile, Mexican cinema had been stalled by bureaucracy and difficulties with the union. Film production was now concentrated in a few hands, and the ability to see new filmmakers emerge was very difficult due to the demands on the directors on the part of the Union of Workers of Cinematographic Production (STPC). Three of the most important film studios disappeared between 1957 and 1958: Tepeyac, Clasa Films and Azteca.

Also in 1958, the Mexican Academy of Motion Picture Arts and Sciences decided to discontinue the Ariel Award recognizing the best productions of the national cinema. The Ariel was instituted in 1946 and emphasized the thriving state of the industry. Nevertheless, the award was revived in 1972 and has taken place annually since then.

== Studios ==
- Estudios Churubusco
- Televisa San Ángel

== See also ==
- Golden Age of Argentine cinema
- Latin American cinema
