= José Guadalupe Cruz (writer) =

- Born: January 31, 1917 Teocaltiche, Jalisco, Mexico
- Died: November 22, 1989 (aged 72)
- Areas: Comics writer, Screenwriter
- Spouse: Ana Maria Ayala Cornejo

José Guadalupe Cruz (January 31, 1917 – November 22, 1989) was a Mexican comics writer and screenwriter.

== Career ==
Born in Teocaltiche, Jalisco, Mexico, Cruz published his first comic when he was 18 years old and his career became one of the most productive and successful in the Mexican comics-scene. In the beginning his works were printed in the magazines Paquin, Paquita and Pepin, and many of these stories captured his readers, like Adelita y las guerrillas.

In 1943 he started to use a system of photomontage to make his comics. He created novels of great power like Carta Brava, Percal, Tango, Ventarron, El Valiente, Tenebral, Dancing and Malevaje. In 1947 he started writing for films and acted in more than thirty movies with directors like Ismael Rodríguez, Agustín P. Delgado, Chano Urueta, Miguel Morayta, René Cardona and Juan Orol. In 1952, he founded his own publishing house, Ediciones José G. Cruz, which published comics like Muñequita, La Pandilla, Rosita Alvirez, El Vampiro Tenebroso and Canciones Inolvidables. Santo, el enmascarado de plata, based on the Mexican wrestler El Santo, was so successful that it was published for 30 years uninterruptedly and is one of the icons of Mexican popular culture.

== Personal life and death ==
On February 10, 1940, Cruz married Doña Ana Maria Ayala Cornejo at age 23, with whom he had his first son, José Gustavo.

Cruz died on November 22, 1989, in Los Angeles, California at the age of 72.

== Selected filmography ==
- Cabaret Shanghai (1950)
- It's a Sin to Be Poor (1950)
- The Lovers (1951)
- What Idiots Men Are (1951)
