= Gangster's Kingdom =

- Directed by: Juan Orol
- Written by: Juan Orol
- Produced by: Juan Orol
- Starring: Juan Orol; Rosa Carmina
- Cinematography: Domingo Carrillo
- Edited by: Juan José Marino
- Music by: Max Urban
- Production company: España Sono Films
- Release date: 6 August 1948
- Running time: 122 minutes
- Country: Mexico
- Language: Spanish

Gangster's Kingdom (Spanish:El reino de los gángsters) is a 1948 Mexican crime film written and directed by Juan Orol who also starred in the film. Like Orol's other films it was an attempt to copy the style of Hollywood films of the era.

== Cast ==
- Víctor Alcocer
- Jorge Arriaga
- Manuel Arvide
- Rosa Carmina
- Roberto Cañedo
- Roberto Corell
- Rafael María de Labra
- Francisco Jambrina
- Cecilia Leger as Mamá
- Kiko Mendive
- Juan Orol
- José Pardavé
- Rafael Plaza Balboa
- Lilia Prado
- Juanita Riverón
- Joaquín Roche
- Ramón Vallarino
- Armando Velasco
- Eduardo Vivas
- Enrique Zambrano

== Bibliography ==
- Daniel Balderston, Mike Gonzalez & Ana M. Lopez. Encyclopedia of Contemporary Latin American and Caribbean Cultures. Routledge, 2002.
