= The Well-paid =

1948 film by Alberto Gout

- Directed by: Alberto Gout
- Written by: José María Carrtero Novillo "El Caballero Audaz"; Alberto Gout
- Produced by: Adolfo, Enrique & Rodolfo Rosas Priegp
- Starring: María Antonieta Pons; Víctor Junco; Blanca Estela Pavón
- Cinematography: Alex Phillips
- Music by: Rosalío Ramírez
- Distributed by: Rosas Priego Productions
- Release date: February 20, 1948 (México)
- Country: Mexico
- Language: Spanish

The Well-paid (in Spanish La bien pagada) is a Mexican drama film directed by Alberto Gout. It was filmed in 1948 and starred María Antonieta Pons and Víctor Junco.

== Plot ==
The billionaire Fernando Jordan (Victor Junco) marries Carola Rute (María Antonieta Pons). Carola becomes lover of Carlos. Fernando surprises together after reading a comment understood in a local newspaper that previously tried to extort him. After meditating the tremendous disappointment, he accepts that he made the mistake not to make her love during their brief marriage. He forces her to sign a letter waiving her rights as wife and jets off abroad for many years. When he returns, he learns that Carola is now a singer and cabaret artist named Piedad of The Diamonds. She was abandoned by her lover.

== Cast ==
- María Antonieta Pons ... Carola Rute / Piedada of The Diamonds
- Victor Junco ... Fernando Jordán
- Blanca Estela Pavón ... Violeta Rute
- Carmen Molina ... Julieta Rute
- Jorge Ancira ... Carlos
- Esperanza Issa ... María Rosa
- Carlos Martínez Baena ... Jorge Rute

== Reviews ==
The film was based on the novel by José María Carretero Novillo "El Caballero Audaz" ("The Bold Caballero"), and was adapted and directed by one of the geniuses of the musical melodrama of Mexican Cinema: Alberto Gout. María Antonieta Pons showed a conversion to glamor with designs created by Armando Valdez Arm Peza, leaving tropical environments becoming a citadina woman with worldly tastes and elegant clothes.
