= Tania, the Beautiful Wild Girl =

1948 Mexican film by Juan Orol

- Directed by: Juan Orol
- Written by: Juan Orol
- Produced by: Juan Orol
- Starring: Rosa Carmina; Manuel Arvide; Juanita Riverón
- Cinematography: Domingo Carrillo
- Music by: Antonio Rosado
- Distributed by: España Sono Films
- Release date: June 4, 1948 (México)
- Country: Mexico
- Language: Spanish

Tania, the Beautiful Wild Girl (in Spanish Tania, la bella salvaje) is a Mexican drama film written, directed and produced by Juan Orol. It was released in 1948 and starring Rosa Carmina and Manuel Arvide.

== Plot ==
Rolando (Manuel Arvide), a millionaire, meets in a South Pacific island a young girl named Tania (Rosa Carmina) an exuberant native which he falls in love. The man decides to take the girl with him to Mexico, where she becomes in a famous cabaret star. But Tania ends betraying and leaves him for another man. Rolando then decides to launch the careers of Fedora (Juanita Riverón), who ends up achieving success. Luck charged Tania her ingratitude, and she ends up falling into ruin.

== Cast ==
- Rosa Carmina as Tania
- Manuel Arvide as Rolando
- Juanita Riverón as Fedora
- Kiko Mendive as Monito
- Lilia Prado as Tania's friend

== Reviews ==
This was the second film directed by Juan Orol with his second film muse: the exuberant Cuban rumbera Rosa Carmina. The film was filmed shortly after her film debut in the film A Woman from the East. Rosa Carmina says: "Begins to like my presence, my films are very successful. I start doing tours throughout Mexico. My dance number was the song wrote by Armando Valdez for the film: "Bururu Manengue" and it was based on pure drums."
