= Toña la Negra =

Background information
- Also known as: "La Sensación Jarocha", Toña la Negra
- Born: Antonia del Carmen Peregrino Álvarez; 2 November 1912; Veracruz, Veracruz, Mexico
- Died: 19 November 1982 (aged 70) Mexico City, Mexico
- Genres: Bolero
- Occupations: Singer, actress
- Instrument: Vocals
- Years active: 1932–1982
- Labels: RCA Victor; Peerless; Orfeón
- Spouse(s): Guillermo Cházaro Ahumada; Víctor Ruiz Pazos (1955–1963)

Antonia del Carmen Peregrino Álvarez (2 November 1912 – 19 November 1982), known by her stage name Toña la Negra (Toña the Black Woman), was a Mexican singer and actress of partial Haitian ancestry, known for her interpretation of boleros and canciones written by Agustín Lara.

== Life and career ==
Toña la Negra was born Antonia del Carmen Peregrino Álvarez on 2 November 1912, in La Huaca, a neighborhood of Veracruz, Veracruz. Her father, Timoteo Peregrino Reyes (born c. 1857), played guitar and was a founding member of a guild of local port workers. Her mother, Daría Álvarez Campos (born c. 1867), sang at family gatherings. Toña had four siblings and three paternal half-siblings.

Toña's paternal grandfather, Severo Peregrino, was from Port-au-Prince, Haiti and had immigrated to Mexico in the 19th century.

Toña began her career in the 1920s singing tangos as the lead singer of the Trío Peregrino-Uzcanga. In 1932, she traveled to Mexico City and met songwriter and composer Agustín Lara. She first became famous for her interpretation of Lara's "Enamorada", as well as "Lamento jarocho", written specially for her to sing. She later popularized "Noche criolla", "Veracruz", and other Lara compositions associated with her home state. She first recorded these songs and many others for Peerless Records in the 1940s.

She began to record for the RCA Victor label in the late 1940s. In February 1953, her single "Como golondrinas" peaked at number 2 on Cashbox's Mexico's Top Ten Tunes chart. She went on to record numerous hit singles and also several studio albums, including Caleidoscopio musical con Toña la Negra (1958), Noche criolla, vol. II (1961), and La sensación jarocha, vol. III (1964).

In the mid-1960s, she signed a contract with the Orfeón label and recorded more studio albums. She recorded two songs with the Sonora Matancera in 1974.

== Personal life ==
Toña la Negra was married twice. Her first husband, Guillermo Cházaro Ahumada, was a musician. They had three sons, Ramón (b. 1932), Guillermo (b. 1933), and Ernesto (1935–1979), and separated in 1945. Her second husband was Mexican jazz pioneer and bass player Víctor "Vitillo" Ruiz Pazos; they were married from 1955 to 1963.

== Death and legacy ==
On Wednesday, 17 November 1982, she was admitted to a hospital in Mexico City because of cardiovascular problems. That following Friday, 19 November, at the age of 70, Toña la Negra died of a heart attack. She was interred in the actors' section of the Panteón Jardín in Mexico City.

The municipality of Veracruz erected a statue of Toña la Negra after her death. The alley where she was born in the old barrio of La Huaca carries her name.

In 1993, German film director Christian Baudissin made a television documentary about Toña la Negra that included interviews with her ex-husband, musician Víctor Ruiz Pazos, and others artists who knew her.

Rafael Figueroa Hernández, a researcher and professor at the Universidad Veracruzana, wrote the first full, in-depth biography of Toña la Negra.

== Discography ==
=== Studio albums ===
- Caleidoscopio musical con Toña la Negra (RCA Victor, 1958)
- Noche criolla, vol. II (RCA Victor, 1960)
- La sensación jarocha, vol. III (Arcano, 1961)
- Íntimas (Orfeón, 1964)
- Toña la Negra interpreta a Agustín Lara, vol. I (Orfeón, 1964)
- Toña la Negra interpreta a Rafael Hernández y Pedro Flores (Orfeón, 1964)
- Toña la Negra interpreta a Agustín Lara, vol. II (Orfeón, 1964)
- Con Orquesta (Discos Fuentes, 1970)

=== Compilation albums ===
- Lo mejor de Toña la Negra
- Inmortales de Toña la Negra
- Las estrellas de La Hora Azul
- Lo mejor de lo mejor: Toña la Negra, 40 temas originales
- RCA 100 años de música
- " RCA "Las Estrellas del Fonografo- Toña La Negra" (1995)

== Selected filmography ==
- Heads or Tails (1937)
- María Eugenia (1943)
- Red Konga (1943)
- The Mulatta of Cordoba (1945)
- Revenge (1948)
- Love for Sale (1951)
- In the Flesh (1951)
- A Galician Dances the Mambo (1951)
- The Night Is Ours (1952)

== See also ==
- Afro-Mexicans
