= List of Mexican films of 1961 =

A list of the films produced in Mexico in 1961 (see 1961 in film):

== 1961 ==
Title	Director	Cast	Genre	Notes
1961
Los hermanos Del Hierro	Ismael Rodríguez	Antonio Aguilar, Columba Domínguez, Julio Alemán		
Vacaciones en Acapulco	Fernando Cortés	Antonio Aguilar, Ariadna Welter, Fernando Casanova, Sonia Furió, Rafael Bertrand, Mapita Cortés, Alfonso Mejía, Fernando Luján, Óscar Ortiz de Pinedo, Polo Ortín, Antonio Raxel	Comedy	
Viridiana	Luis Buñuel	Silvia Pinal, Francisco Rabal	Black-comedy drama	Winner of the Palme d'Or in 1961 Cannes Film Festival
Juana Gallo	Miguel Zacarías	María Félix, Luis Aguilar, Jorge Mistral	Drama	Entered into the 2nd Moscow International Film Festival
Las Leandras	Gilberto Martínez Solares	Enrique Rambal, Amparo Arozamena		
Teresa	Alfredo B. Crevenna	Maricruz Olivier, Fernando Rey		
Young People	Luis Alcoriza		Crime	Entered into the 11th Berlin International Film Festival
¡Mis abuelitas... nomás!	Mauricio de la Serna	Clavillazo, Sara Garcia, Prudencia Grifell		
El analfabeto	Miguel M. Delgado	Cantinflas, Sara Garcia, Lilia Prado	Comedy	
Jóvenes y rebeldes	Julián Soler	Resortes, Lorena Velázquez, César Costa, Ana Bertha Lepe, Sonia Furió, Ana Luisa Peluffo, David Silva, Fernando Luján		
Cuando regrese mamá	Rafael Baledón	Ofelia Montesco, María Duval, Rafael Bertrand, Alejandro Ciangherotti		
Limosneros con garrote	Jaime Salvador	Viruta y Capulina, Kippy Casado, Carlos Agosti, Arturo "Bigotón" Castro		
Yanco (film)	Servando González, Mohy Quandour	Ricardo Ancona, Jesús Medina, María Bustamante		
Brave Pigeon	Rogelio A. González	Rosita Quintana, Miguel Aceves Mejía, Sara García		
El buena suerte	Rogelio A. González	Miguel Aceves Mejía, Sara García		
El jinete negro	Rogelio A. González			
El mundo de los vampiros	Alfonso Corona Blake	Mauricio Garcés, Guillermo Murray	Horror	
El proceso de las señoritas Vivanco	Mauricio de la Serna	Sara García, Pedro Armendáriz, Ana Luisa Peluffo		
Kill Yourself, My Love				
Lovely Memory	Antonio del Amo	Joselito, Libertad Lamarque, Sara García		
Pegando con tubo	Jaime Salvador	Marco Antonio Campos, Gaspar Henaine		
Puss in Boots	Roberto Rodriguez	Santanon		
Rosa Blanca	Roberto Gavaldón	Ignacio López Tarso, Christiane Martel		
Santo Contra los Zombies	Benito Alazraki	Santo, Armando Silvestre, Jaime Fernández		
Santo vs. the Evil Brain	Joselito Rodríguez	Joaquín Cordero, Norma Suárez, Enrique Zambrano, Rodolfo Guzmán Huerta		
The Curse of the Crying Woman	Rafael Baledón	Rosa Arenas, Abel Salazar, Rita Macedo, Carlos López Moctezuma, Enrique Lucero		
The Curse of the Doll People	Benito Alazraki	Elvira Quintana, Ramón Gay		
The White Horse		Sara García		
