= The Coward (1953 film) =

1953 film by Julio Bracho

- Directed by: Julio Bracho
- Written by: Julio Alejandro; Julio Bracho; Arduino Maiuri
- Produced by: J. Ramón Aguirre; Salvador Elizondo
- Starring: Irasema Dilián; Ernesto Alonso; Carlos Navarro
- Cinematography: Agustín Jiménez
- Edited by: Jorge Busto
- Music by: Raúl Lavista
- Production company: Clasa Films Mundiales
- Release date: 5 March 1953
- Running time: 115 minutes
- Country: Mexico
- Language: Spanish

The Coward (Spanish: La cobarde) is a 1953 Mexican drama film directed by Julio Bracho and starring Irasema Dilián, Ernesto Alonso and Carlos Navarro.

== Cast ==
- Irasema Dilián as Mara
- Ernesto Alonso as Arturo
- Carlos Navarro as Roberto
- Carlos Agostí as Julio
- Andrea Palma as Irene, hermana de Arturo
- Giuseppe Di Stefano as Cantante
- Angélica María as Mara, niña
- Marina Herrera as Lupita, criada
- Héctor Mateos as Comisario
- Ángel Merino as Marino
- Daniel Arroyo as Invitado a boda
- Alejandro Ciangherotti as Roberto, niño
- Enrique Díaz Indiano as Doctor Arriaga
- Ana María Hernández as Invitada a boda
- Cecilia Leger as Invitada a fiesta
- Fernando Luján as Julio, niño

== Bibliography ==
- María Luisa Amador. Cartelera cinematográfica, 1950-1959. UNAM, 1985.
