= Forbidden Fruit (1953 film) =

1953 film by Alfredo B. Crevenna

- Directed by: Alfredo B. Crevenna
- Written by: Julio Alejandro; Edmundo Báez; Arduino Maiuri
- Produced by: Salvador Elizondo; Mauricio de la Serna
- Starring: Arturo de Córdova; Irasema Dilián; María Douglas
- Cinematography: Agustín Jiménez
- Edited by: Jorge Busto
- Music by: Carlos Tirado
- Production company: Clasa Films Mundiales
- Release date: 1 April 1953
- Running time: 109 minutes
- Country: Mexico
- Language: Spanish

Forbidden Fruit (Spanish: Fruto Prohibido or Fruto de tentación) is a 1953 Mexican drama film directed by Alfredo B. Crevenna and starring Arturo de Córdova, Irasema Dilián and María Douglas.

== Cast ==
- Arturo de Córdova as Marcos Villarreal
- Irasema Dilián as Minú
- María Douglas as Bárbara
- Jorge Reyes as Ramón
- Eduardo Alcaraz as Felipe, mayordomo
- Fanny Schiller as Señorita directora
- Luz María Aguilar as Estudiante colegio
- Amparo Arozamena as La actriz
- Lonka Becker as Profesora colegio
- Victorio Blanco as Botones
- Ada Carrasco as Señora Luz María Gómez
- Lupe Carriles as Fan de Villareal
- Ethel Carrillo as Estudiante colegio
- Roberto Corell as Artemio
- María Cortés
- Linda Cristal as Julia
- Rafael Estrada as Gerente hotel
- Miguel Ángel Ferriz as Señor Vidal
- Emilio Garibay as Apolonio Martínez
- Hilda Grey as Virginia
- Luis Guevara as Juanito
- Rosario Gálvez as Olga
- Ana María Hernández as Invitada al baile
- Ismael Larumbe as Gervasio
- Cecilia Leger as Invitada a fiesta
- Elena Luquín as Estudiante colegio
- Tana Lynn as Greta
- Pepe Martínez as Invitado a baile
- Héctor Mateos as Invitado a baile
- Álvaro Matute as Invitado al baile
- Kika Meyer as Fan de Villarreal
- Roberto Meyer as Invitado al baile
- Alicia Montoya
- Irlanda Mora as Estudiante colegio
- Diana Ochoa as Mamá de Juanito
- Ignacio Peón as Juez en boda
- Carlos Robles Gil as Invitado al baile
- Joaquín Roche as Invitado al baile
- Alicia Rodríguez as Meche
- Félix Samper as Pariente de Minú
- Manuel Santigosa as Notario
- Alta Mae Stone as Invitada gringa en fiesta
- María Valdealde as Hortensia
- Armando Velasco as Juez

== Bibliography ==
- María Luisa Amador. Cartelera cinematográfica, 1950-1959. UNAM, 1985.
