= The Unfaithful (1953 film) =

- Directed by: Alejandro Galindo
- Written by: Julio Alejandro; Arduino Maiuri
- Produced by: J. Ramón Aguirre
- Starring: Irasema Dilián; Armando Calvo; María Douglas
- Cinematography: Agustín Jiménez
- Edited by: Jorge Busto
- Music by: Raúl Lavista
- Production company: Clasa Films Mundiales
- Distributed by: Clasa-Mohme
- Release date: 10 July 1953
- Running time: 101 minutes
- Country: Mexico
- Language: Spanish

The Unfaithful (Spanish: Las infieles) is a 1953 Mexican drama film directed by Alejandro Galindo and starring Irasema Dilián, Armando Calvo and María Douglas.

== Cast ==
- Irasema Dilián as Beatriz Valdés
- Armando Calvo as Rafael
- María Douglas as Constanzia
- Emperatriz Carvajal as Emilia
- Rita Macedo as Leticia
- Rebeca Iturbide as Carmen
- Eva Martino as Enriqueta
- Martha Valdés as Consuelo
- Prudencia Grifell as Mamá de Constanzia
- Eduardo Alcaraz as Aurelio
- Daniel Arroyo as Invitado a fiesta
- Manuel Arvide as Pedro
- Josefina Burgos as Empleada salón de belleza
- Rodolfo Calvo as Amante viejo de Enriqueta
- Alberto Carrière as Carlos
- Rafael Estrada as Invitado a fiesta
- Georgina González
- Maruja Grifell as Dueña salón de belleza
- Ana María Hernández as Invitada a fiesta
- Cecilia Leger as Monja
- Fernando Luján as Luisito
- Alicia Malvido as Empleada salón de belleza
- Concepción Martínez as Invitada a fiesta
- Pepe Martínez as Mesero
- Álvaro Matute as Roberto
- Julio Monterde as Tito, invitado a fiesta
- Salvador Quiroz as Doctor Reyes
- Lina Regis as Rosa, empleada salón de belleza
- Carlos Robles Gil as Invitado a fiesta
- Alta Mae Stone as Gringa en fiesta
- Manuel Trejo Morales as Mario
- Enrique Zambrano as Invitado a fiesta
- Guillermo Álvarez Bianchi as Sacerdote

== Bibliography ==
- Mora, Carl J. Mexican Cinema: Reflections of a Society, 1896-2004. McFarland & Co, 2005.
