= The Dangerous Age (1950 film) =

1950 film

- Directed by: José Díaz Morales
- Written by: José Díaz Morales; Carlos León; Carlos Sampelayo; Mauricio de la Serna
- Produced by: Vicente Saisó Piquer; Mauricio de la Serna
- Starring: María Elena Marqués; Andrea Palma; Carlos Navarro
- Cinematography: Agustín Jiménez
- Edited by: Jorge Bustos
- Music by: Manuel Esperón
- Release date: 17 August 1950
- Running time: 90 minutes
- Country: Mexico
- Language: Spanish

The Dangerous Age (Spanish: La edad peligrosa) is a 1950 Mexican drama film directed by José Díaz Morales and starring María Elena Marqués, Andrea Palma and Carlos Navarro. It was shot at the Clasa Studios in Mexico City. The film's sets were designed by the art director Javier Torres Torija.

== Synopsis ==
Two young woman go out to experience the world after being brought up in the sheltered life a convent. They move into a boarding house and one of them falls in love with a medical student.

== Cast ==
- María Elena Marqués as Mercedes
- Andrea Palma as Sor Antonia
- Carlos Navarro as Luis Fernández
- Patricia Morán as Patricia
- Alfredo Varela as Apolonio Godinez
- Manuel Dondé as Pedro Martínez
- Cecilia Leger as doña Prudencia
- María Gentil Arcos as Madre superiora
- Eduardo Vivas as Professor manuel
- Alfredo Varela padre as Padre Anselmo
- Arturo Soto Rangel as Anciano borracho
- Amparo Montes as Cantante

== Bibliography ==
- Riera, Emilio García. Historia documental del cine mexicano: 1949. Ediciones Era, 1969.
- Wilt, David E. The Mexican Filmography, 1916 through 2001. McFarland, 2024.
