= Dino Maiuri =

Italian screenwriter, film director and producer

- Born: Arduino Maiuri; December 8, 1916; Frosinone, Lazio, Italy
- Died: September 13, 1984 (aged 67); Ceprano, Lazio, Italy
- Occupation: Screenwriter
- Spouse: Irasema Dilián (m. 1950)
- Children: 2

Arduino "Dino" Maiuri (December 8, 1916 - September 13, 1984) was an Italian screenwriter, who was active in both Italian and Mexican cinema from the late 1940s through the 1970s. He was nominated for an Ariel Award for Best Screenplay for My Wife and the Other One (1952), and won a Nastro d'Argento for Best Screenplay for Bandits in Milan (1968). He was the husband of actress Irasema Dilián.

== Partial filmography ==
- I'm in the Revue (1950)
- The Transporter (1950)
- Angélica (1952)
- My Wife and the Other One (1952)
- The Woman You Want (1952)
- Forbidden Fruit (1953)
- Spring in the Heart (1956)
- Kiss the Girls and Make Them Die (1966)
- Danger: Diabolik (1968)
- Bandits in Milan (1968)
- Bandits in Rome (1968)
- Brief Season (1969)
- Violent City (1970)
- Compañeros (1970)
- Long Live Your Death (1971)
- The Man with Icy Eyes (1971)
- The Case Is Closed, Forget It (1971)
- The Sicilian Checkmate (1972)
- Hospitals: The White Mafia (1973)
- Revolver (1973)
- War Goddess (1973)
- Street Law (1974)
- Order to Kill (1974)
- Go Gorilla Go (1975)
- The Big Racket (1976)
- The Payoff (1978)
- Corleone (1978)
- The Warning (1980)
