= Lydia Fernández =

Lydia Fernández may refer to:

- Lidia Fernández, Costa Rican suffragist and feminist
- Lydia Fernández (singer), Mexican singer
