= La ciudad perdida =

La ciudad perdida may refer to:

- Ciudad Perdida, the archaeological site of an ancient city in the Sierra Nevada de Santa Marta of Colombia
- The Lost City (1950 film), a Mexican drama film
- The Lost City (1955 film), an Italian-Spanish drama film
