= Girls in Uniform =

Girls in Uniform may refer to:

- Mädchen in Uniform, 1931 film
- Girls in Uniform (1951 film), a Mexican drama film
- Mädchen in Uniform (1958 film), a German drama film
- "Girls in Uniform", a 1967 episode of Play of the Month
- "Girls in Uniform", a song by Beady Eye from BE
