= My Favourite =

1950 film

- Directed by: Chano Urueta
- Written by: Eduardo Galindo; Pedro Galindo; Antonio Guzmán Aguilera
- Produced by: Jesús Galindo
- Starring: Sara García; Antonio Badú; Martha Roth
- Cinematography: Agustín Jiménez
- Edited by: Jorge Bustos
- Music by: Rosalío Ramírez
- Production company: Filmadora Chapultepec
- Release date: 31 May 1950
- Running time: 90 minutes
- Country: Mexico
- Language: Spanish

My Favourite (Spanish: Mi preferida) is a 1950 Mexican comedy film directed by Chano Urueta and starring Sara García, Antonio Badú and Martha Roth. The film's sets were designed by the art director Ramón Rodríguez Granada.

== Cast ==
- Sara García as Doña Sara
- Antonio Badú as Enrique
- Martha Roth as Rosie Johnson
- Fernando Soto "Mantequilla" as Curuco
- Chucho Martínez Gil as Chucho
- Arturo Martínez as Lencho Mireles
- Irving Lee as Mr. George Johnson
- Maruja Grifell as Mrs. Barbara Johnson
- José Torvay as Esbirro
- Julio Ahuet as Esbirro
- Jorge Treviño as Esbirro
- Ángel Infante as Esbirro

== Bibliography ==
- Amador, María Luisa. Cartelera cinematográfica, 1950-1959. UNAM, 1985.
- Riera, Emilio García. Historia documental del cine mexicano: 1949-1950. Universidad de Guadalajara, 1992
