= El jinete negro =

- Spanish: El jinete negro
- Directed by: Rogelio A. González
- Written by: Janet Alcoriza; Fernando Galiana
- Produced by: Sergio Kogan
- Starring: Julio Almada, Mauricio Garcés, María Eugenia San Martín, Kippy Casado
- Cinematography: Víctor Herrera
- Edited by: Jorge Bustos
- Music by: Gustavo César Carrión
- Production company: Estudios Churubusco Azteca S.A.
- Distributed by: Azteca Films Inc.
- Release date: January 12, 1961 (Mexico)
- Running time: 80 min
- Country: Mexico
- Language: Spanish

El jinete negro is a 1961 Mexican film directed by Rogelio A. González and starring Julio Almada, Mauricio Garcés, María Eugenia San Martín and Kippy Casado. It is a western parody with an early appearance by Garcés, it was one of three ranchera comedies that year by González based on screenplays by Janet Alcoriza (formerly Raquel Rojas) and Fernando Galiana. The other two were El buena suerte and Paloma brava.
