= Lydia Fernández (singer) =

- Birth name: Lydia Gómez Valdivia
- Also known as: "La Cancionera de México" (The Songstress of Mexico)
- Born: 4 July 1917; Guadalajara, Jalisco, Mexico
- Died: 9 December 1995 (aged 78); Mexico City, Mexico
- Genres: Bolero, foxtrot
- Occupation: Singer
- Instrument: Vocals
- Years active: 1936–1995
- Labels: Peerless; RCA Víctor; Cladrijo

Lydia Gómez Valdivia (4 July 1917 – 9 December 1995), known as Lydia Fernández, was a Mexican singer who began her career in the 1930s and became the first female performer of the songs of composer Gonzalo Curiel. She also was among the first performers of Mexican bolero songs.

She introduced and recorded several Curiel songs, including "Caminos de ayer", "Anoche", "Cobardía", "Mírame a los ojos", and "Si supieras". Her career also spanned radio, stage, and nightclubs. When he was an announcer at radio station XEW, actor Arturo de Córdova introduced her as "La Cancionera de México", which means "The Songstress of Mexico".

== Biography ==
Lydia Gómez Valdivia was born on 4 July 1917 in Guadalajara, Jalisco. Her parents' names were Jesús Gómez and Antonina Valdivia. She began her career around 1934, when she was 17 years old.

By 1936 she was living in Mérida, Yucatán, and working as a singer on a radio station of that city. Teté Cuevas, José Gamboa Ceballos, Alvarito, Pepe Domínguez and Rosa María Alam also worked for that station. In that year, composer Gonzalo Curiel and his orchestra arrived in Mérida to play at the city's carnival. She had always wanted to meet Curiel and was introduced to him by Alonso López Méndez, brother of poet Ricardo López Méndez. Curiel invited her to debut in Mexico City. She accepted and they traveled to the nation's capital.

Three months after her arrival in Mexico City, she debuted at the Teatro Follies in revues in which she introduced the Curiel songs "Caminos de ayer" and "Anoche". Mario Ruiz Suárez, father of composer Mario Ruiz Armengol, was the theater's musical director. Due to the great success she obtained with her stage performances, all the revues she appeared in were produced especially for her.

Less than a week after her first stage performance in the capital, she debuted on radio at Mexico's most important station, the XEW, in a fifteen-minute program sponsored by Focos Luxo. Arturo de Córdova, then a XEW announcer, called her "La Cancionera de México". At the same time, she recorded her first singles for the Peerless label.

Her first nightclub performance took place in El Retiro, located in front of the Toreo de la Condesa, where she sang with Adolfo Girón's orchestra. She also sang in the taproom of the Hotel Reforma.

She also introduced "Vereda tropical", Curiel's most famous song. The composer wanted Fernández to sing the song in the film Hombres del mar (1938) in order to dub the voice of actress Esther Fernández, but the singer was on a tour in Tamaulipas and Lupita Palomera was the one who ended up not only introducing it in film but also releasing it as a hit single. Some time later, Fernández acknowledged that "because of things of destiny, it was Lupita and not me, who immortalized that beautiful melody".

In her XEQ radio programs, sponsored by Joyería La Princesa, she sang songs written and composed by Gabriel Ruiz, who was also born in Guadalajara.

She married businessman Elías Daniel Capon on 16 December 1939, and shortly after decided to retire to devote more time to her family. However, she was not permanently retired, since she would return from time to time to the stage or to the recording studios. She recorded four songs in 1948 for Peerless Records.

RCA Víctor Mexicana hired her in 1953 to record several songs with Daniel Zarabozo's conjunto. Four of these recordings were reissued in 1961, when RCA Camden (RCA Víctor's subsidiary label) compiled them into a collector's edition LP record.

On 7 October 1970, she sang "Nostalgia" and "Anoche" in a posthumous tribute to Gonzalo Curiel at the Teatro Degollado in Guadalajara. The tribute, in which artists such as Martha Triana, Amparo Montes, and Lupita Palomera participated, was organized by the Government of the State of Jalisco, the National Association of Actors, the Society of Authors and Composers of Mexico, and Guadalajara's Fiestas en Octubre Committee.

On 15 November 1970, she participated in a posthumous tribute to Agustín Lara at the Alameda Central in Mexico City. More than 20,000 people attended this event, which took place in the open-air theater that bore the composer's name. Chela Campos, Ana María González, Avelina Landín, Juan Arvizu, Rebeca, Eduardo Solís, Salvador García, Jorge Fernández, Amparo Montes, and Pedro Vargas also participated.

On 4 September 1983, the press reported that Fernández would participate in the posthumous tribute to singer Toña la Negra at the Teatro de la Ciudad in Mexico City.

In her later years, she also appeared on Mexican television programs such as Channel 2's Hoy mismo and Channel 14's Nostalgia.

She died of liver failure on 9 December 1995 in Mexico City. She was 78 years old. Her remains were cremated at the Panteón Francés de San Joaquín.
