= Esperanza Issa =

Mexican actress

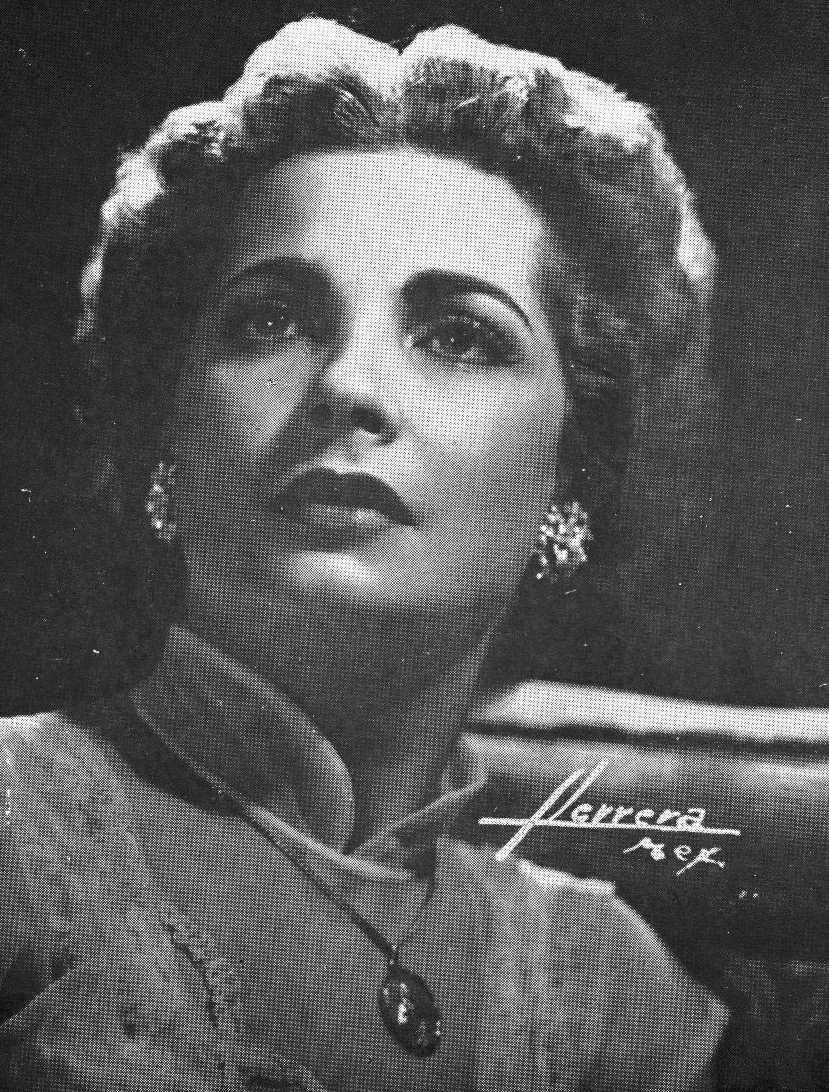
- Esperanza Issa in 1954
- Born: Esperanza Issa Abud; 1921; Tapachula, Chiapas, Mexico
- Died: 28 May 2001 (aged 79–80); Mexico City, Mexico
- Occupation: Actress
- Years active: 1944–1960

Esperanza Issa Abud (1921 – 28 May 2001) was a Mexican actress.

One of a group of Mexican actors of Lebanese descent during the Golden Age of Mexican Cinema alongside Donna Behar, Leonora Amar and Antonio Badú, she became known for her roles in films such as La mancornadora (1949) and Madre querida (1951).

== Selected filmography ==
- The Prince of the Desert (1947)
- The Well-paid (1948)
- Aunt Candela (1948)
- The Lost City (1950)
- Paco the Elegant (1952)
- Angélica (1952)
- Black Skull (1960)

== Bibliography ==
- Martínez Assad, Carlos (2025). Libaneses: Hechos e imaginario de los inmigrantes en México (in Spanish). Fondo de Cultura Economica. ISBN 978-607-16-8647-3.
- Wilt, David E. (2024) [2004]. The Mexican Filmography, 1916 through 2001. McFarland. ISBN 978-1-4766-0430-5.
- Cinemas D Amerique Latine (in Spanish). Presses Univ. du Mirail. 2002. ISBN 978-2-85816-612-1.
