= Love for Love (film) =

1950 film

- Directed by: Ernesto Cortázar
- Written by: Ernesto Cortázar; Mauricio Magdaleno; Íñigo de Martino
- Produced by: Alfonso Rosas Priego
- Starring: Marga López; Antonio Badú; Víctor Junco
- Cinematography: Agustín Jiménez
- Edited by: Alfredo Rosas Priego
- Production company: Producciones Rosas Priego
- Release date: 11 January 1950
- Running time: 90 minutes
- Country: Mexico
- Language: Spanish

Love for Love (Spanish: Amor con amor se paga) is a 1950 Mexican drama film directed by Ernesto Cortázar and starring Marga López, Antonio Badú and Víctor Junco.

The film's art direction was by Jorge Fernández.

== Cast ==
- Marga López as Valentina Méndez
- Antonio Badú
- Víctor Junco
- Lilia Prado
- Alfredo Varela
- Felipe de Alba
- Arturo Soto Rangel
- Óscar Pulido
- Conchita Gentil Arcos
- José Muñoz
- Armando Velasco
- Salvador Godínez
- Juan Orraca
- Salvador Quiroz
- Jorge Slim

== Bibliography ==
- Emilio García Riera. Historia documental del cine mexicano: 1949-1950. Universidad de Guadalajara, 1992.
