= The Daughter of the Regiment (film) =

The Daughter of the Regiment (original French title: La fille du régiment), an 1840 opera by Gaetano Donizetti, has been depicted on film numerous times:

- The Daughter of the Regiment, the first opera film, a two-minute production premiering in New York City in July 1898
- Daughter of the Regiment (1929 film), a British-German production
- Daughter of the Regiment (1933 film), an Austrian-German production
- The Daughter of the Regiment (1944 film), a Mexican production
- The Daughter of the Regiment (1953 film), a West German-Italian production
- Daughter of the Regiment (1953 film), an Austrian production
- Die Regimentstochter (1962), a TV movie starring Dutch tenor John van Kesteren as Tonio
