= The Life of Agustín Lara =

- Directed by: Alejandro Galindo
- Written by: Alejandro Galindo; Ricardo Garibay
- Produced by: Pascual Aragonés; Antonio Badú; Agustín Lara
- Starring: Germán Robles; Lorena Velázquez; Ofelia Montesco
- Cinematography: José Ortiz Ramos
- Edited by: Fernando Martínez
- Music by: Manuel Esperón
- Production company: Promex
- Release date: 12 February 1959
- Running time: 116 minutes
- Country: Mexico
- Language: Spanish

The Life of Agustín Lara (Spanish: La vida de Agustín Lara) is a 1959 Mexican musical film co-written and directed by Alejandro Galindo, and starring Germán Robles, Lorena Velázquez and Ofelia Montesco. It is a biographical film about the life of the musician Agustín Lara.

== Cast ==
- Germán Robles as Agustín Lara
- Lorena Velázquez as María Islas
- Ofelia Montesco as La mariposa
- Tito Junco as Manuel Rangel, el garbanzo
- Antonio Prieto as Dr. Ortiz Tirado
- Sara Montes as Violeta
- Fanny Schiller as Sra. Esperia, patrona burdel
- Pilar Pellicer as Admiradora joven
- Jorge Russek as Rodolfo, coronel
- Miguel Ángel Ferriz as Emilio Azcarraga
- Pin Crespo as Pura
- Emma Grise as Amante celosa del garbanzo
- León Barroso as Productor de pelicula
- Rafael Estrada as Director de pelicula
- Amparo Montes as Cantante
- Julio Aldama as Cantante
- Daniel Arroyo as Invitado a fiesta
- Antonio Brillas as Martín
- José Luis Caballero
- Gloria Cansino as Amiga de María en fiesta
- María Luisa Cortés as Invitada a fiesta
- Felipe del Castillo as Mayordomo
- María Duval as María Luisa Olguín
- Fernando Fernández as Cantante
- Carmen Guerrero as Pupila burdel
- Raúl Guerrero as Empleado cementerio
- Graciela Lara as Novia en Veracruz
- Pedro León as Empleado burdel
- Laura Martinez
- Mikaela as Cantante
- Guillermo Ramirez as man in the cantina
- Amelia Rivera as Espectadora programa radio
- Roberto Spriu as Locutor programa radio
- Miguel Suarez as Toledito
- Manuel Trejo Morales as Cliente burdel
- Pedro Vargas as Cantante
- Celia Viveros as Sirvienta del coronel

== Bibliography ==
- Mora, Carl J. Mexican Cinema: Reflections of a Society, 1896-2004. McFarland & Co, 2005.
