= Doña Perfecta (film) =

1951 film

- Directed by: Alejandro Galindo
- Written by: Benito Pérez Galdós; Iñigo de Martino
- Produced by: Alejandro Galindo
- Starring: Dolores del Río; Carlos Navarro; Esther Fernández; Julio Villarreal
- Distributed by: Columbia; Cabrera Films
- Release date: October 10, 1951
- Running time: 97 minutes
- Country: Mexico
- Language: Spanish

Doña Perfecta is a 1951 Mexican film version of the famous novel by Benito Pérez Galdós, directed by Alejandro Galindo and starring Dolores del Río.

== Plot summary ==
The action occurs in 19th century Mexico, when a young liberal named Don José (Pepe) Rey, arrives in a city, with the intention of marrying his cousin Rosario. This was a marriage of convenience arranged between Pepe's father Juan and Juan's sister, Perfecta (Dolores del Río).

Upon getting to know each other, Pepe and Rosario declare their eternal love, but in steps Don Inocencio, the cathedral canon, who meddles and obstructs the marriage as well as the good intentions of Doña Perfecta and her brother Don Juan. Over the course of time, several events lead up to a confrontation between Pepe Rey and his aunt Perfecta, which is caused by her refusal to allow Pepe and Rosario to marry, because Pepe is a non-believer.

== Cast ==
- Dolores del Río... Doña Perfecta
- Carlos Navarro ... Pepe
- Esther Fernández ... Rosario
- Julio Villarreal ... Don Inocencio

== Comments ==
Adapted from Doña Perfecta, the novel of Benito Perez Galdos, the plot is moved to Mexico nineteenth century mired in dispute between liberal and conservative ideals that erupted during Guerra de Reforma. This film ranks' 29 in the list of The 100 best films of Mexican cinema, in the opinion of 25 critics and specialists, published by the magazine SOMOS in July 1994.
