= The Prince of the Desert =

1947 film

- Directed by: Fernando A. Rivero
- Written by: Fernando A. Rivero
- Produced by: José Luis Calderón
- Starring: Abel Salazar; Malú Gatica; René Cardona
- Cinematography: Ezequiel Carrasco
- Edited by: Jorge Bustos
- Music by: 77Francisco Argote77
- Production company: Producciones Calderón
- Distributed by: Columbia Pictures
- Release date: 23 May 1947
- Running time: 85 minutes
- Country: Mexico
- Language: Spanish

The Prince of the Desert (Spanish: El príncipe del desierto) is a 1947 Mexican romantic adventure film directed by Fernando A. Rivero and starring Abel Salazar, Malú Gatica and René Cardona. The film's sets were designed by the art director José Rodríguez Granada. It was screened at the 1947 Locarno Film Festival.

== Cast ==
- Abel Salazar as Ahmed
- Malú Gatica as Lucila
- René Cardona as Omar
- Esperanza Issa as Salúa
- Eduardo Casado as Giafar
- Luis Mussot as Abdalah
- Arturo Soto Rangel as Sr. Albornoz
- Jorge Mondragón as Sr. Monroy
- Eugenia Galindo as Sra. Monroy
- Violeta Guirola as Srita. Teresa Monroy

== Bibliography ==
- Riera, Emilio García . Historia documental del cine mexicano: 1946–1948. Universidad de Guadalajara, 1992.
