= Los que volvieron =

- Directed by: Alejandro Galindo
- Screenplay by: Jerome Cady; Salvador Novo
- Based on: Five Came Back; 1939 film by John Farrow
- Produced by: J.M. Noriega
- Starring: Sara García; David Silva; Malú Gatica
- Cinematography: Alex Phillips
- Edited by: Gloria Schoemann
- Music by: Raúl Lavista
- Distributed by: Ramex Films
- Release date: January 21, 1948
- Running time: 78 minutes
- Country: Mexico
- Language: Spanish

Los que volvieron ("Those Who Returned") is a 1948 Mexican film. It stars Sara García, and includes Malú Gatica.

== Plot summary ==
The dangerous prisoner "Vazquez" is being transported back to Argentina from Mexico after being captured during a failed bank robbery. On the plane transporting him are also two pilots, an elderly couple named Ortos, two women named Margerita and Lucy, the child of a sports star named Pibe and his caretaker Pedro and the wealthy but rude Jorge Mancera. The plane crashes in the jungle during a horrible storm and it takes some time for it to be fixed. Stranded for a month, the passengers alternate between befriending one another and being at each others' throat, especially in Jorge's case as he is very entitled. The plane is eventually fixed but an oil leak means that it can't take off again without falling apart. The cannibalistic natives have discovered the passengers meanwhile and after killing Pedro they plan to kill the rest of the passengers. The drums begin sounding over the hills frightening everyone as they realize what is at stake. The plane can only take off now with five passengers in it meaning some have to be left behind. Vazquez delegates himself as the judge to decide who will stay as he wants to stay because either way, he faces the death penalty for his crimes if he returns to Argentina. The elderly Ortos couple tell him they would like to stay as they are already very old and don't have many years left anyways and Vazquez chooses Jorge to also stay because his duplicitous nature (including attempting to bribe Vazquez with money and a lawyer to get out of the execution should they return) telling him that Jorge isn't worth saving. Jorge attempts to jump Vazquez but Vazquez shoots and kills him. The survivors enter the plane and get ready to go as the natives' drums resound again and bid farewell to Vazquez and the Ortos. Vazquez tells Mr. Ortos that he has three bullets with which to quickly kill the three of them so they won't have to be taken back to the village and tortured to death, even though he only has two bullets in his gun. The Ortos' couple embrace for the final time as Vazquez shoots the last two bullets at them. In the final scene, Vazquez awaits his fate as the natives close in on him while in the sky, the plane flies away to safety.

== Cast ==
- Sara García as Marta Ortos
- David Silva as Carlos Cervantes
- Malú Gatica as Lucy Alcázar
- Rodolfo Landa as Capitán Roberto Beltrán
- Marión Inclán as Margarita Téllez
- Dario Cossier as Pedro
- Carlos López Moctezuma as Ibáñez
- Alejandro Cobo as Vázquez
- Rafael Banquells hijo as Jorge Mancera (as Rafael Banquels Jr.)
- Antonio Palacios as Prof. Enrique Ortos
