= The Woman You Want =

1952 film

- Directed by: Emilio Gómez Muriel
- Written by: Edmundo Báez; Egon Eis; Dino Maiuri
- Produced by: Salvador Elizondo
- Starring: Irasema Dilián; Jorge Mistral; Eduardo Noriega
- Cinematography: Alex Phillips
- Edited by: Jorge Bustos
- Music by: Raúl Lavista
- Production company: Clasa Films Mundiales
- Distributed by: Clasa-Mohme
- Release date: 4 September 1952
- Running time: 109 minutes
- Country: Mexico
- Language: Spanish

The Woman You Want (Spanish: La mujer que tu quieres) is a 1952 Mexican drama film directed by Emilio Gómez Muriel and starring Irasema Dilián, Jorge Mistral and Eduardo Noriega. The film's sets were designed by the art director Jesús Bracho.

== Cast ==
- Irasema Dilián
- Jorge Mistral
- Eduardo Noriega
- Julio Villarreal
- Alejandro Ciangherotti
- Roberto Corell
- Francisco Jambrina
- Tana Lynn
- Jorge Martínez de Hoyos
- Felipe Montoya
- Juan Orraca
- Francisco Pando
- Ignacio Peón

== Bibliography ==
- Amador, María Luisa. Cartelera cinematográfica, 1950-1959. UNAM, 1985.
- Lancia, Enrico & Poppi, Roberto. Le attrici: dal 1930 ai giorni nostri. Gremese Editore, 2003.
- Riera, Emilio García. Historia documental del cine mexicano: 1951-1952. Universidad de Guadalajara, 1992
