= Jorge Mistral =

Spanish actor (1920–1972)

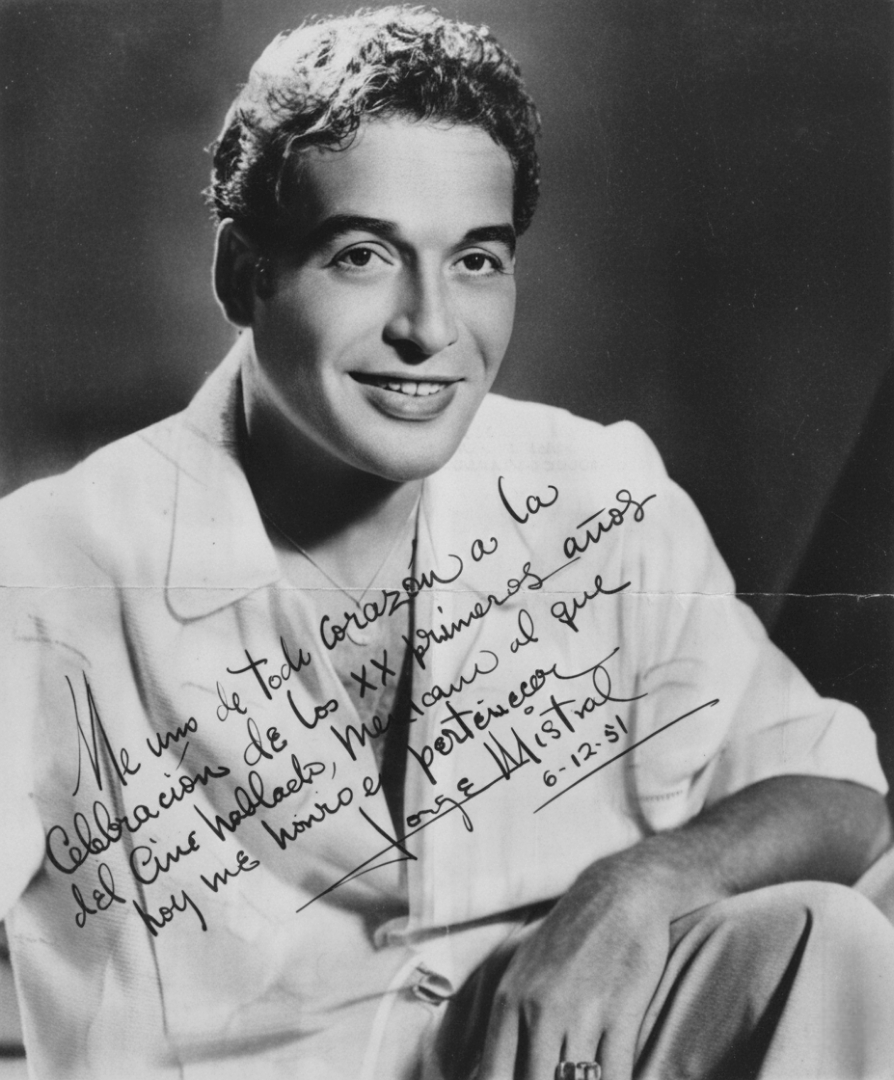
- Mistral in 1951
- Born: Modesto Llosas Rosell; 24 November 1920; Aldaia, Spain
- Died: 20 April 1972 (aged 51); Mexico City, Mexico
- Years active: 1944–1972
- Spouse(s): Olga Marchetti, Cristina Ruiz Cano, Graciela Dufau, divorced

Modesto Llosas Rosell (24 November 1920 – 20 April 1972), known professionally as Jorge Mistral, was a Spanish film actor. During the 1940s, he became a star in films produced by CIFESA. In the 1950s, he lived and worked in Mexico and appeared in Luis Buñuel's Abismos de pasión in 1954. Later, in the 1960s, he directed three films.

== Early life ==
Jorge Mistral was born Modesto Llosas Rosell on 24 November 1920 in Aldaia, province of Valencia, Spain. His father was from Puerto Rico and his mother from Catalonia.

== Death ==
Suffering from cancer, Mistral committed suicide with a gunshot while living in Mexico City, Mexico.

== Filmography ==
- La Llamada del mar (1944)
- Ángela es así (1945)
- White Mission (1946)
- The Emigrant (1946)
- The Gypsy and the King (1946)
- Mar abierto (1946)
- Las Inquietudes de Shanti Andía (1947)
- Héroes del 95 (1947)
- La Nao capitana (1947)
- Lady in Ermine (1947)
- Pototo, Boliche y Compañía (1948)
- Madness for Love (1948)
- Botón de ancla (1948)
- Neutrality (1949)
- Currito of the Cross (1949)
- Sabela de Cambados (1949)
- La Manigua sin dios (1949)
- The Duchess of Benameji (1949)
- Pequeñeces (1950)
- Pobre corazón (1950)
- Burlada (1951)
- Desired (1951)
- Monte de piedad (1951)
- Peregrina (1951)
- La trinca del aire (1951)
- Love Was Her Sin (1951)
- El Mar y tú (1952)
- The Night Is Ours (1952)
- Tres hombres en mi vida (1952)
- Derecho de nacer, El (1952)
- The Woman You Want (1952)
- Sister San Sulpicio (1952)
- The Lie (1952)
- Apasionada (1952)
- The Count of Monte Cristo (1953)
- Quiero vivir (1953)
- Orquídeas para mi esposa (1954)
- Camelia (1954)
- Tres citas con el destino (1954)
- Abismos de pasión (1954)
- An Andalusian Gentleman (1954)
- Más fuerte que el amor (1955)
- Tren expreso, El (1955)
- Caso de la mujer asesinadita, El (1955)
- Para siempre (1955)
- Amor en cuatro tiempos (1955)
- The Big Lie (1956)
- The Cat (1956)
- The Legion of Silence (1956)
- Andalusia Express (1956)
- Schiave di Cartagine, Le (1957)
- Boy on a Dolphin (1957)
- Cabo de hornos (1957)
- The Sword and the Cross (1958)
- Racconti d'estate (1958)
- Amor prohibido (1958)
- Amore a prima vista (1958)
- La venganza (1958)
- Carmen la de Ronda (1959)
- Creo en ti (1960)
- The White Sister (1960)
- È arrivata la parigina (1960)
- Ventolera (1961)
- Tres Romeos y una Julieta (1961)
- Juana Gallo (1961)
- Chamaca, La (1961)
- Amor de los amores, El (1962)
- Bajo un mismo rostro (1962)
- Pecado (1962)
- Historia de una noche (1963)
- Shéhérazade (1963)
- Gunfighters of Casa Grande (1964)
- Fiebre del deseo, La (1966)
- Piel desnuda, La (1966)
- Crimen sin olvido (1968)
- Debutantes en el amor, Los (1969)
- Corrompidos, Los (1971)
- Ardiente deseo, El (1971)
- Puertas del paraíso, Las (1971)
- Justicia tiene doce años, La (1973)
- Invasión de los muertos, La (1973)
- Diamantes, oro, y amor (1973)

== Filmography as film director ==
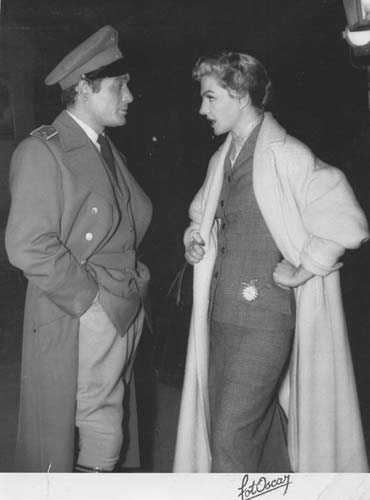
Jorge Mistral with Zully Moreno in: Amor prohibido, 1958

- Crimen sin olvido (1968) (Inédita)
- La Piel desnuda (1966)
- La Fiebre del deseo (1966)

== Screenwriter ==
- Crimen sin olvido (1968)
- La Piel desnuda (1966)
