= Angélica (1952 film) =

1952 film by Alfredo B. Crevenna

- Directed by: Alfredo B. Crevenna
- Written by: Edmundo Báez; Dino Maiuri
- Produced by: Óscar Dancigers
- Starring: Irasema Dilián; Carlos Navarro; Ramón Gay
- Cinematography: José Ortiz Ramos
- Edited by: Carlos Savage
- Music by: Manuel Esperón
- Production company: Ultramar Films
- Release date: 12 June 1952
- Running time: 93 minutes
- Country: Mexico
- Language: Spanish

Angélica is a 1952 Mexican crime melodrama film directed by Alfredo B. Crevenna and starring Irasema Dilián, Carlos Navarro and Ramón Gay. It was shot at the Tepeyac Studios in Mexico City. The film's sets were designed by the art director Edward Fitzgerald.

== Synopsis ==
An Italian woman flees from her homeland to Mexico where she ends up working in a shady cabaret and is drawn into the criminal milieu of its owner. One night she meets and falls in love with a pilot.

== Cast ==
- Irasema Dilián as Angélica
- Carlos Navarro as Arturo Silva
- Ramón Gay as Armando
- Andrés Soler as Inspector Gutiérrez
- Alberto Mariscal as Mario
- Fanny Schiller as Madre de Arturo
- Tana Lynn as Sara
- Víctor Alcocer as Chino
- Quintín Bulnes as Julio
- Pepita Morillo as Cabaretera
- Lilian Oppenheim as Lucía
- Hilda Grey as Cabaretera
- Velia Vegar as Cabaretera con sobrepeso
- Ethel Carrillo as Esther
- Julio Monterde as Hermano de Arturo
- Sergio Virel as Carlos
- Esperanza Issa as María Elena

== Bibliography ==
- Amador, María Luisa. Cartelera cinematográfica, 1950-1959. UNAM, 1985.
- Riera, Emilio García. Historia documental del cine mexicano: 1951-1952. Universidad de Guadalajara, 1992
