= Malú Gatica =

Chilean actress and singer

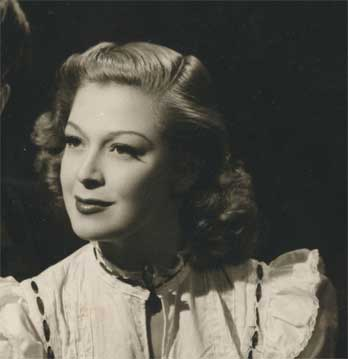
- Malú Gatica
- Born: Henrietta Maria de la Luz Gatica Boisier; January 15, 1922. Purén
- Died: August 10, 1997 (aged 75); Santiago
- Occupations: Actress and singer
- Notable work: Seven Women

Henrietta Maria de la Luz Gatica Boisier (January 15, 1922 – August 10, 1997), known as Malú Gatica, was a Chilean actress and singer.

== Biography ==
Gatica was born in Purén. With her parents, the journalist Roberto Gatica and Leonie Boisier, Gatica moved to New York in 1928 where she attended elementary and secondary school, as well as studying languages and music. Her first public appearance occurred as a singer at the age of 16 on NBC, where her father worked.

Later, in Buenos Aires, she studied theater at the Conservatoire Cunill Cabanellas. Her maternal grandfather was the French settler, French José Boisier Bourgeaux. In 1948 in the US, she married Eugene Fell, an American military attaché at the Mexican Embassy; they had a son, Leon. The marriage did not last long and she lost custody of her child. In 1995, she received the Orden al Mérito Gabriela Mistral, issued by the Ministry of Education of Chile in recognition of his outstanding and long career. She died in Santiago, where she returned in 1962.

== Filmography ==
- Verdejo gasta un millón (1941) Chile
- Verdejo gobierna en Villaflor (1942) Chile
- Se abre el abismo (1944) Argentina
- Seven Women (1944) Argentina
- Amar es vivir (1946) Mexico
- Los que volvieron (1946) Mexico
- Todo un caballero (1946) Mexico
- Ocho hombres y una mujer (1946) Mexico
- The Prince of the Desert (1947) Mexico
- Strange Obsession (1947) Mexico
- The Newlywed Wants a House (1948)) Mexico
- Target Unknown (1951) US
- The Lady and the Bandit (1951) US aka Dick Turpin's Ride
- Captain Pirate (1952) US
- El gran circo Chamorro (1955) Chile
- Sábado Negro (1959) Mexico
