= Wuthering Heights (1954 film) =

Abismos de pasión
- Theatrical release poster
- Directed by: Luis Buñuel
- Written by: Luis Buñuel
- Based on: Wuthering Heights; 1847 novel by Emily Brontë
- Produced by: Óscar Dancigers; Abelardo L. Rodríguez
- Starring: Irasema Dilián; Jorge Mistral
- Cinematography: Agustín Jiménez
- Edited by: Carlos Savage
- Music by: Raúl Lavista
- Distributed by: Azteca Films Inc. (1954, USA); Plexus (1983, USA)
- Release dates: 30 June 1954 (Mexico); 27 December 1983 (US)
- Running time: 91 minutes
- Country: Mexico
- Language: Spanish

Wuthering Heights is a 1954 Mexican film directed by Luis Buñuel. Its original Spanish title is Abismos de pasión ("Abysses of Passion").

In 1931, Buñuel and Pierre Unik wrote a screenplay based on the 1847 Emily Brontë novel Wuthering Heights, but plans to produce the film fell through. Buñuel's producer, Oscar Dancigers, brought the idea back in the 1950s and was able to secure funding. The 1954 film was produced by Dancigers and Abelardo L. Rodríguez. It stars Irasema Dilián and Jorge Mistral as the Cathy and Heathcliff characters.

== Plot summary ==
Gone several years, the brooding Alejandro returns to the hacienda of his foster sister, Catalina, whom he loves, to find her married to the wealthy and effete Eduardo. Alejandro hates Eduardo and Catalina's brother Ricardo; now wealthy, and with a lien on the drunken Ricardo's ranch.

He longs for Catalina to run away with him. Although she loves him, her decision is complicated by her love of Eduardo, and is pregnant with his child. She wants Alejandro to stay nearby, a soul mate, but he, ruled by instinct and passion, stays only to hurt her. He woos Isabel, Eduardo's impressionable young sister. The passions of impossible love and corrosive hate play out against Mexico's barren high chaparral.

== Cast ==
- Irasema Dilián as Catalina
- Jorge Mistral as Alejandro
- Lilia Prado as Isabel
- Ernesto Alonso as Eduardo
- Francisco Reiguera as José
- Hortensia Santoveña as María
- Jaime González Quiñones as Jorge
- Luis Aceves Castañeda as Ricardo

== Reception ==
On the Review aggregator website Rotten Tomatoes, 80% of critic's reviews are positive, with an average rating of 6.8/10.

In 1983, New York Times film critic Vincent Canby called it "an almost magical example of how an artist of genius can take someone else's classic work and shape it to fit his own temperament without really violating it.".

In 2002, Slant writer Ed Gonzalez called it better than William Wyler's critically acclaimed 1939 adaptation, saying "Unlike William Wyler’s inferior 1939 film adaptation, Luis Buñuel’s Abismos de Pasión is more than a literate extrapolation of Emily Bronte’s gothic masterpiece Wuthering Heights".

In 1988, Chicago Reader critic Jonathan Rosenbaum gave a mixed review, stating that it "discards the original novel’s framing strategy of telling the story from the viewpoint of two outsiders", which he calls a "regrettable elision", though he also says that "Buñuel’s low-budget melodrama has a certain gothic ferocity that’s missing in the other versions".
