= The Newlywed Wants a House =

1948 film

- Directed by: Gilberto Martínez Solares
- Written by: Baltasar Fernández Cué; Gilberto Martínez Solares
- Based on: Too Many Cooks by Frank Craven
- Produced by: José M. Noriega
- Starring: María Elena Marqués; Rafael Baledón; Malú Gatica
- Cinematography: Agustín Martínez Solares
- Edited by: Jorge Bustos
- Music by: Gonzalo Curiel
- Production company: Ramex Films
- Distributed by: RKO Radio Pictures de México
- Release date: 25 December 1948
- Running time: 83 minutes
- Country: Mexico
- Language: Spanish

The Newlywed Wants a House (Spanish: El casado casa quiere) is a 1948 Mexican comedy film directed by Gilberto Martínez Solares and starring María Elena Marqués, Rafael Baledón and Malú Gatica. It was part of a scheme by RKO Pictures to remake some of their older works in Mexico. It is a remake of the 1931 film Too Many Cooks, itself based on an earlier play by Frank Craven. It was shot at the Churubusco Studios in Mexico City. The film's sets were designed by the art director Gunther Gerszo.

== Synopsis ==
Carlos Rivas draws his savings out of the bank to build his ideal house for himself and his fiancée Alicia. However he soon finds his plans interfered in by friends and her large family.

== Cast ==
- María Elena Marqués as Alicia Conejo
- Rafael Baledón as Carlos Rivas
- Malú Gatica as Elena Luna
- Eduardo Noriega as Quico Posada
- Roberto Soto as Señor Miguel Conejo
- Julio Villarreal as Tío Jorge
- Fernando Soto "Mantequilla" as Tasi
- Emma Roldán as Señora Conejo
- Manuel Noriega as Contratista
- Conchita Carracedo as Tinita
- Juan García as Luis Conejo
- José Ángel Espinosa "Ferrusquilla" as José Conejo
- María Valdealde as Tía Eva
- Norma Gloria as Berta Conejo
- Raúl Guerrero as Eduardo Conejo
- Alfonso Jiménez as Pedro Conejo
- Pedro Elviro as Tío Urbano

== Bibliography ==
- Jacobson, Brian R. (ed.) In the Studio: Visual Creation and Its Material Environments. University of California Press, 2020.
- Riera, Emilio García. Historia documental del cine mexicano: 1946–1948. Universidad de Guadalajara, 1992.
