= Carnival in the Tropics =

- Directed by: Carlos Villatoro
- Written by: Carlos Villatoro
- Starring: Agustín Isunza; Eufrosina García; Manuel Medel; Mario Moreno «Cantinflas»
- Cinematography: Ross Fisher
- Music by: Darío Martínez Soto
- Release dates: May 1942 (outside Mexico); 7 June 1946 (Mexico)
- Country: Mexico
- Language: Spanish

Carnival in the Tropics (Spanish: Carnaval en el trópico), also known in Spanish as Fiesta en Veracruz (English: "Holiday in Veracruz") is a 1942 Mexican comedy film written and directed by Carlos Villatoro. Although the film was released in other countries in 1942, it wasn't released in Mexico until 1946 due to copyright disputes.

The film's art direction was by Ramón Rodríguez Granada.

== Plot ==
Plácido (Agustín Isunza) and his wife Mercedes "Meche" (Eufrosina García) are two merchants who long to go to the carnivals in Veracruz, the problem is that they do not have enough money to attend. To do this, they decide to convince the lender Homobono (Manuel Medel) to finance the trip. There, the three friends experience adventures in which they spend all their money.

== Cast ==
- Óscar Alatorre
- Mario Moreno «Cantinflas»
- Roberto Cañedo
- Edmundo Espino
- Carlos Max García
- Eufrosina García as Mercedes "Meche"
- Ana María González
- Rafael Hernández
- Chino Ibarra
- Agustín Isunza as Plácido
- Gustavo López
- Diana Macklen
- Manuel Medel as Homobono
- José Elías Moreno
- Rayito de Oro
- Gabriel Ruiz
- Estanislao Schillinsky
- Roberto Soto
- David Valle González

== Production ==
The film was shot in Veracruz in 1940 and 1941. The film contained footage showing Cantinflas performing bullfights and performing on the Xalapa Carnival stage. Villatoro also used material from the Cantinflas short film Cantinflas boxeador. This footage was used without the prior permission of Cantinflas, who took legal action, which delayed the release of the film in Mexico until 1946.

== Bibliography ==
- Rodríguez, Rolando. Cantinflas, torero. Clío, 1995. ISBN 978-9-6869-3222-5
- Garcia Berumen, Frank Javier. Brown Celluloid: Latino/a Film Icons and Images in the Hollywood Film Industry, Volume I (1894–1959). Vantage Press, 2003. ISBN 978-0-5331-4305-4
- García Riera, Emilio. Historia documental del cine mexicano: 1941. Ediciones Era, 1969.
- Wilt, David E. The Mexican Filmography: 1916 through 2001. McFarland & Co Inc, Jefferson NC 2004. ISBN 978-0-7864-6122-6
