= Four Hours Before His Death =

1953 film by Emilio Gómez Muriel

- Directed by: Emilio Gómez Muriel
- Written by: Ramón Obón; Jaime Salvador
- Produced by: Gustavo de León
- Starring: Carlos Navarro; Carmen Montejo
- Cinematography: Rosalío Solano
- Edited by: Fernando Martínez
- Music by: Jorge Pérez
- Release date: 30 October 1953
- Running time: 83 minutes
- Country: Mexico
- Language: Spanish

Four Hours Before His Death (Spanish: Cuatro horas antes de morir) is a 1953 Mexican drama film directed by Emilio Gómez Muriel and starring Carlos Navarro and Carmen Montejo.

== Cast ==
- José Baviera
- Lupe Carriles
- Mimí Derba
- Enrique Díaz 'Indiano'
- Rafael Estrada
- Pedro Galván
- Yadira Jiménez
- María Cristina Lesser
- José María Linares-Rivas
- Héctor Mateos
- Francisco Meneses
- Carmen Montejo as Marga
- Felipe Montoya
- José Luis Moreno
- Luis Mussot
- Carlos Navarro
- Tito Novaro
- Andrea Palma
- Luis Salazar
- Armando Velasco
- Julio Villarreal
- Enrique Zambrano

== Bibliography ==
- María Luisa Amador. Cartelera cinematográfica, 1950-1959. UNAM, 1985.
