= Felipe Was Unfortunate =

1947 film

- Directed by: René Cardona
- Produced by: Alfredo Ripstein Jr.
- Starring: Antonio Badú; Meche Barba; Fernando Soto "Mantequilla"
- Production company: Producionnes AB
- Release date: 25 June 1947
- Running time: 90 minutes
- Country: Mexico
- Language: Spanish

Felipe Was Unfortunate (Spanish: Felipe fue desgraciado) is a 1947 Mexican comedy film directed by René Cardona and starring Antonio Badú, Meche Barba and Fernando Soto "Mantequilla". It was part of the genre of Ranchera films popular during the Golden Age of Mexican Cinema.

== Synopsis ==
Felipe is wrongly suspected of having murdered a woman and has to flee town.

== Cast ==
- Antonio Badú as Felipe
- Meche Barba as Rosa
- Jorge Ancira as Marcial
- Fernando Soto "Mantequilla"
- Rita Macedo
- Dolores Camarillo
- José Elías Moreno
- Daniel Arroyo
- Fernando Casanova
- Julio Ahuet
- José Escanero
- Antonio R. Frausto
- Pascual García Peña
- Paco Martínez
- Hernán Vera

== Bibliography ==
- Riera, Emilio García. Historia documental del cine mexicano: 1946-1948. Universidad de Guadalajara, 1992
- Wilt, David E. The Mexican Filmography, 1916 through 2001. McFarland, 2024.
