= Crimen sin olvido =

- Directed by: Jorge Mistral
- Written by: Gustavo Ghirardi, Jorge Mistral
- Starring: Jorge Mistral; Graciela Dufau
- Cinematography: Pablo Meli
- Edited by: J. Cavaloti
- Music by: Ástor Piazzolla, Ernesto Cavour, Alfredo Domínguez, Gilbert Fabré
- Release date: 1968
- Countries: Argentina; Bolivia
- Language: Spanish

Crimen sin olvido is a 1968 Argentine film directed by Jorge Mistral. It was a joint production with Bolivia.

== Cast ==
- Jorge Mistral
- Graciela Dufau
- Héctor Méndez
- Rosángela Balbo
- Santiago Gómez Cou
- Marcos Zucker
