= Irasema Dilián =

Brazilian-Italian actress (1924–1996)

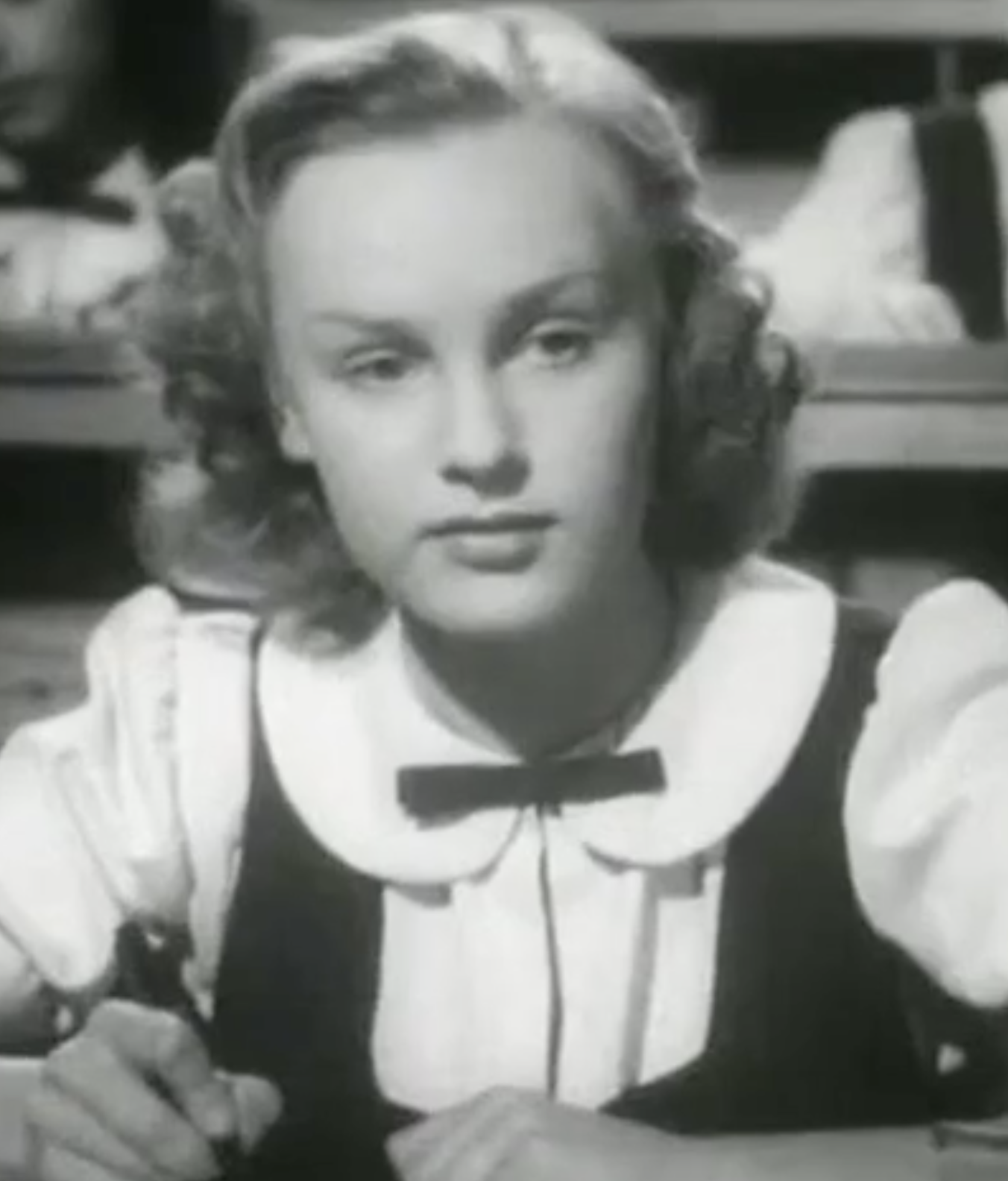
- Dilián in the movie Schoolgirl Diary (1941)
- Born: Eva Irasema Warschalowska; May 27, 1924; Rio de Janeiro, Rio de Janeiro, Brazil
- Died: April 16, 1996 (aged 71); Ceprano, Frosinone, Italy
- Other name: Eva Dilián
- Education: Centro Sperimentale di Cinematografia
- Occupation: Actress

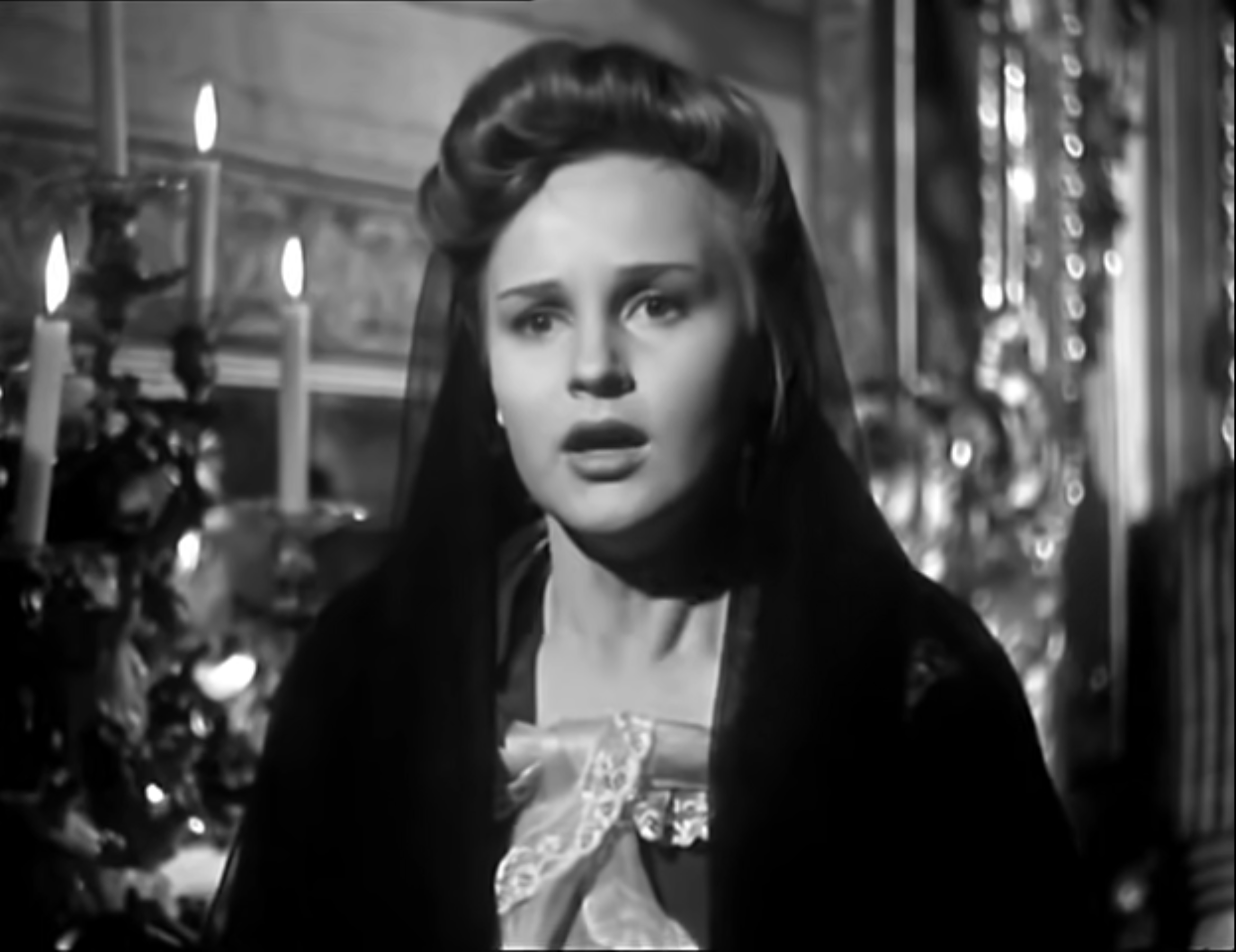
Dilián in The Captain's Daughter (1947)

Eva Irasema Warschalowska (May 27, 1924 – April 16, 1996), known by her stage name Irasema Dilián, was a Brazilian-Italian actress, who appeared in Italian, Spanish and Mexican films. She was nominated for the Ariel Award for Best Actress for her performance in Stolen Paradise (1951).

== Early life ==
Dilián was born Eva Irasema Warschalowska in Rio de Janeiro, Brazil, to Polish parents. Her father was a diplomat for the Polish government, and Dilián was raised in various countries due to his work, eventually settling in Italy. She attended the Centro Sperimentale di Cinematografia, graduating in 1940.

== Career ==
Dilián began her film career in Italy, having appeared in Vittorio De Sica's Maddalena, Zero for Conduct. Over the next few years she worked for de Sica, Riccardo Freda, and Mario Soldati, together with actors like Alida Valli and Rossano Brazzi. She became a major leading lady of Italian cinema during the early 1940s, most notably in telefoni bianchi films. She also worked as an Italian-language dubber, notably dubbing Edna May Wonacott in Alfred Hitchcock's Shadow of a Doubt (1943).

She appeared in four Spanish films between the years 1946 and 1949 before moving to Mexico and making her debut in Girls in Uniform (1951), a remake of the 1931 German picture Mädchen in Uniform. In 1952, Dilián was nominated for an Ariel Award for Best Actress for Stolen Paradise. Over the next several years, Dilián starred in a number of important films with such major stars as Arturo de Córdova, Pedro Armendáriz and Pedro Infante, and played the leading female role in Luis Buñuel's 1954 adaptation of Wuthering Heights.

Some of her Mexican films were scripted by her Italian husband, Dino Maiuri. Dilián's last Mexican-made film was Pablo and Carolina (1957), though she did appear in several co-productions in 1956. In 1958, she appeared in her last Spanish-speaking film. She retired from showbusiness in the 1960s.

== Personal life ==
Dilián was married Italian screenwriter Dino Maiuri. They had two children, Coralla and Antonio.

=== Death ===
Dilián died in Ceprano, Italy on April 16, 1996, aged 71.

== Filmography ==
- Maddalena, Zero for Conduct (1940)
- La Comédie du bonheur (1940)
- Schoolgirl Diary (1941)
- Teresa Venerdì (1941)
- I Sette peccati (1942)
- Violets in Their Hair (1942)
- The Princess of Dreams (1942)
- Malombra (1942)
- Music on the Run (1943)
- Cero en conducta (1945)
- Black Eagle (1946)
- A New Play (1946)
- When the Night Comes (1946)
- The Captain's Daughter (1947)
- The Courier of the King (1947)
- Thirty Nine Love Letters (1950)
- Women Without Names (1950)
- I'm in the Revue (1950)
- The Merry Widower (1950)
- Born of Unknown Father (1950)
- Girls in Uniform (1951)
- Stolen Paradise (1951)
- Angélica (1952)
- The Woman You Want (1952)
- The Coward (1953)
- Forbidden Fruit (1953)
- The Unfaithful (1953)
- Dos mundos y un amor (1954)
- Wuthering Heights (Abismos de pasión) (1953)
- Un Minuto de bondad (1954)
- La Desconocida (1954)
- Historia de un abrigo de mink (1955)
- Spring in the Heart (1956)
- Y si ella volviera (1957)
- Pablo and Carolina (1957)
- La Estrella del rey (1957)
- La Muralla (1958)
