= Los fanfarrones =

- Directed by: Rogelio A. González
- Screenplay by: José María Fernández Unsáin (original story); Alfredo Varela, Jr. (adaptation)
- Produced by: Sergio Kogan
- Starring: Miguel Aceves Mejía; Flor Silvestre; Julio Aldama; Mauricio Garcés; Irma Dorantes; Verónica Loyo
- Cinematography: Ezequiel Carrasco
- Edited by: Jorge Bustos
- Music by: Jesús Zarzosa
- Production company: Alfa Films
- Release date: 10 November 1960 (Mexico)
- Running time: 90 minutes
- Country: Mexico
- Language: Spanish

Los fanfarrones is a 1960 Mexican western comedy film directed by Rogelio A. González, and starring Miguel Aceves Mejía, Flor Silvestre, Julio Aldama, Mauricio Garcés, Irma Dorantes and Verónica Loyo.
