= The Lost City (1950 film) =

- Directed by: Agustín P. Delgado
- Written by: José G. Cruz; Agustín P. Delgado
- Produced by: Pedro Galindo
- Starring: Martha Roth; Roberto Romaña; Esperanza Issa
- Cinematography: Agustín Jiménez
- Edited by: Jorge Busto
- Music by: Jorge Pérez
- Production company: Filmadora Chapultepec
- Release date: 22 November 1950
- Running time: 90 minutes
- Country: Mexico
- Language: Spanish

The Lost City (Spanish: La ciudad perdida) is a 1950 Mexican drama film directed by Agustín P. Delgado and starring Martha Roth, Roberto Romaña and Esperanza Issa.

The film's sets were designed by the art director Ramón Rodríguez Granada.

== Cast ==
- Martha Roth
- Roberto Romaña
- Esperanza Issa
- Arturo Soto Rangel
- José Baviera
- Carlos Valadez
- Juan Garcia
- Joaquín García Vargas
- Mario García 'Harapos'
- José G. Cruz
- Aurora Walker
- Fernando Galiana
- Carmen Manzano
- Lupe Carriles

== Bibliography ==
- María Luisa Amador. Cartelera cinematográfica, 1950-1959. Centro Universitario de Estudios Cinematográfico, 1985.
