= Strange Obsession =

1947 film

- Directed by: José Díaz Morales
- Written by: José Díaz Morales
- Produced by: José Luis Calderón
- Starring: Antonio Badú; Malú Gatica; Alejandro Ciangherotti
- Cinematography: Ezequiel Carrasco
- Edited by: Jorge Bustos
- Music by: Francisco Argote
- Production company: Producciones Calderón
- Distributed by: Columbia Pictures
- Release date: 6 March 1947
- Running time: 85 minutes
- Country: Mexico
- Language: Spanish

Strange Obsession (Spanish: Extraña obsesión) is a 1947 Mexican drama film directed by José Díaz Morales and starring Antonio Badú, Malú Gatica and Alejandro Ciangherotti. Matilde Landeta worked as assistant director. The film's sets were designed by the art director Luis Moya.

== Cast ==
- Antonio Badú
- Malú Gatica
- Alejandro Ciangherotti
- Luis G. Barreiro
- Eduardo Casado
- Jesús Valero

== Bibliography ==
- Plazaola, Luis Trelles. Cine y mujer en América Latina: directoras de largometrajes de ficción. Editorial de la Universidad de Puerto Rico, 1991.
- Riera, Emilio García. Historia documental del cine mexicano: 1946–1948. Universidad de Guadalajara, 1992.
