= Los enredos de una gallega =

- Directed by: Fernando Soler
- Written by: Luis Alcoriza; Janet Alcoriza
- Produced by: Óscar Dancigers
- Starring: Niní Marshall; Fernando Soto "Mantequilla"
- Cinematography: José Ortiz Ramos
- Edited by: Carlos Savage
- Music by: Manuel Esperón
- Release date: 11 October 1951 (Mexico)
- Running time: 98 min
- Country: Mexico
- Language: Spanish

Los enredos de una gallega ("The Entanglements of a Galician Woman") is a 1951 Mexican comedy film directed by Fernando Soler and starring Niní Marshall and Fernando Soto "Mantequilla".

== Plot ==
Cándida (Niní Marshall) is a Galician woman who lives in Mexico and earns a living selling lottery tickets. Her dream is to be able to buy a restaurant, but she doesn't have enough money. In her quest to try to make it, she stumbles upon a scammer, Filogono (Fernando Soto "Mantequilla"). In a stroke of luck she wins the first prize of the lottery, but the bad luck for her continues because she cannot find the ticket.

== Cast ==
- Niní Marshall as Cándida
- Fernando Soto "Mantequilla" as Filogonio (as Fernando Soto "Mantequilla")
- Joaquín Roche hijo as Beto
- Ramón Gay as El Bicicletas
- Sara Montes as Magda
- Antonio Bravo as Don Severo
- Nacho Contla as Don Feliciano
- Eduardo Alcaraz as Don León
- Aurora Ruiz as Doña María
- Luis Badillo as Cándida's Yucatecan Boss
- Emilio Brillas as Vacuum Cleaner Salesman
- Roberto Cobo as El Fenómeno, bullfighter
- Toña la Negra as Singer
- Víctor Alcocer as Restaurant customer (uncredited)
- Daniel Arroyo as Restaurant customer (uncredited)
- Ricardo Avendaño as Bartender (uncredited)
- Victorio Blanco as Funeral home customer (uncredited)
- Josefina Burgos as Restaurant waitress (uncredited)
- Rodolfo Calvo as Judge (uncredited)
- Lupe Carriles as Neighbor (uncredited)
- Enrique Carrillo as Policeman (uncredited)
- Alfonso Carti as Cándida's Client (uncredited)
- Enedina Díaz de León as Neighbor (uncredited)
- Cecilia Leger as Neighbor (uncredited)
- Pepe Martínez as Mute Man (uncredited)
- Álvaro Matute as Reporter (uncredited)
- Joaquín Roche as Cabaret waiter (uncredited)
- Manuel Trejo Morales as Police chief (uncredited)
- Sergio Virel as Friend of El Fenómeno (uncredited)
- Enrique Zambrano as Friend of El Bicicletas (uncredited)
