= Spring in the Heart =

1956 film

- Directed by: Roberto Rodríguez
- Written by: Dino Maiuri; Mauricio de la Serna
- Produced by: Aurelio García Yévenes
- Starring: Andy Russell; Irasema Dilián; Enrique Rambal
- Cinematography: Jorge Stahl Jr.
- Edited by: Fernando Martínez
- Music by: Sergio Guerrero
- Production company: Producciones Rodríguez Hermanos
- Release date: 20 September 1956
- Running time: 100 minutes
- Country: Mexico
- Language: Spanish

Spring in the Heart (Spanish: Primavera en el corazón) is a 1956 Mexican musical comedy film directed by Roberto Rodríguez and starring Andy Russell, Irasema Dilián and Enrique Rambal. It was shot in Eastmancolor at the Churubusco Studios in Mexico City. The film's sets were designed by the art director Salvador Lozano Mena.

== Cast ==
- Andy Russell as Andrés Valdés
- Irasema Dilián as Graciela
- Enrique Rambal as Bobby; Roberto Garza
- Eduardo Alcaraz as Arturo Dávila
- Emma Arvizu as Tía Eugenia
- Nicolás Rodríguez as Don Enrique
- Ernesto Finance as Don Alfonso
- María Gentil Arcos as Dueña de pensión
- Antonio Raxel as Gino Pandolfi
- Irma Castillón as Chabela, niña
- Guillermo Álvarez Bianchi as Pedro
- Queta Lavat as Olga
- Polo Ortín as Cartero
- Víctor Alcocer as Raúl Ramírez, Delegado Policía

== Bibliography ==
- Amador, María Luisa. Cartelera cinematográfica, 1950-1959. UNAM, 1985.
- Riera, Emilio García. Historia documental del cine mexicano: 1955-1956. Universidad de Guadalajara, 1993
