= The Chicken Hawk =

1951 film

- Directed by: Rogelio A. González
- Written by: Rogelio A. González
- Produced by: Óscar J. Brooks; Felipe Mier
- Starring: Pedro Infante; Antonio Badú; Lilia Prado
- Cinematography: Gabriel Figueroa
- Edited by: José W. Bustos
- Music by: Manuel Esperón
- Production company: Mier y Brooks
- Release date: 26 January 1951
- Running time: 107 minutes
- Country: Mexico
- Language: Spanish

The Chicken Hawk (Spanish: El gavilán pollero) is a 1951 Mexican comedy western film directed by Rogelio A. González and starring Pedro Infante, Antonio Badú and Lilia Prado. It was shot at the Tepeyac Studios in Mexico City. The film's sets were designed by the art director Ramón Rodríguez Granada.

== Cast ==
- Pedro Infante as José Inocencio Meléndez 'El Gavilán'
- Antonio Badú as Luis Lepe
- Lilia Prado as Antonia 'La Gela'
- Ana María Villaseñor as Lucha
- Armando Arriola as Don Próspero
- Facundo Rivero as Conjunto
- Víctor Alcocer as El Pachuco de Oro
- Emilio Garibay as Alguacil
- María Luisa Cortés as Cabaretera

== Bibliography ==
- Pitts, Michael R. Western Movies: A Guide to 5,105 Feature Films. McFarland, 2012.
- Riera, Emilio García. Historia documental del cine mexicano: 1951-1952. Universidad de Guadalajara, 1992
