= María Douglas =

Mexican actress (1922–1973)

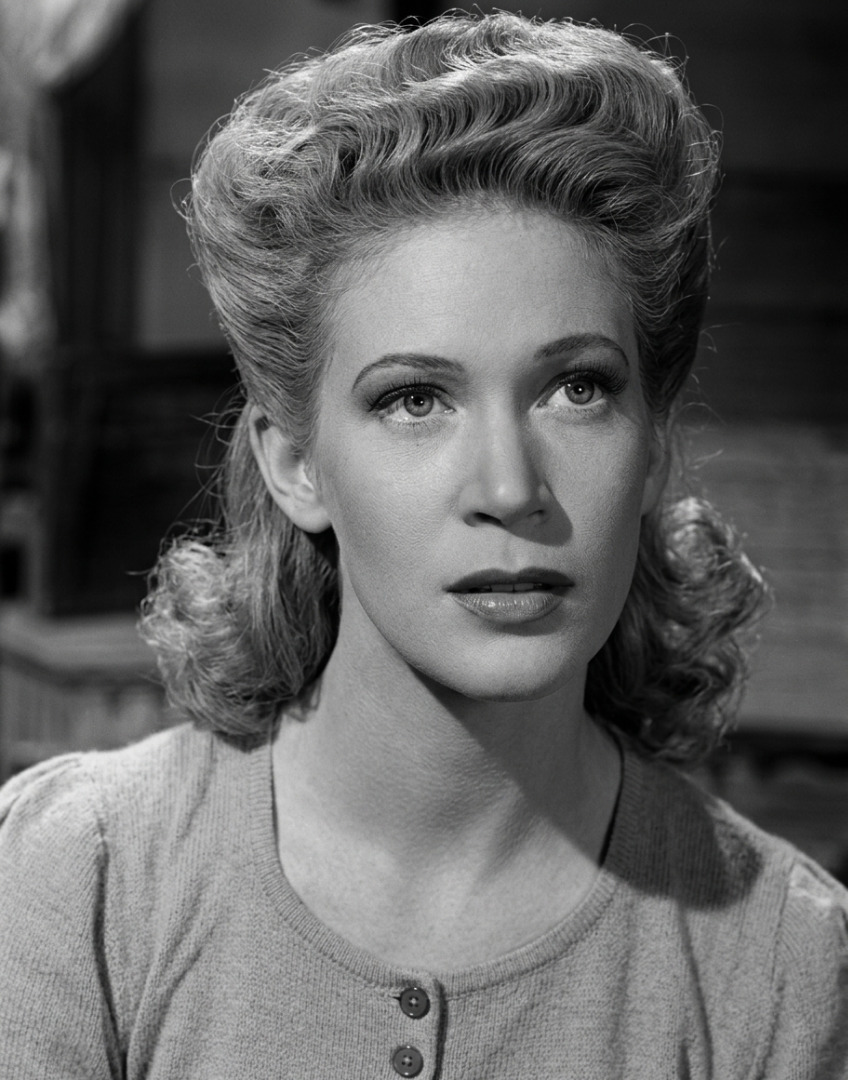
- María Douglas in Tentación (1943)
- Born: 22 June 1922; Mexico City, Mexico
- Died: 17 December 1973 (aged 51); Mexico City, Mexico
- Occupation: Actress
- Years active: 1943 - 1973 (film)

María Douglas (June 22, 1922 – December 17, 1973) was a Mexican stage and film actress.

== Selected filmography ==
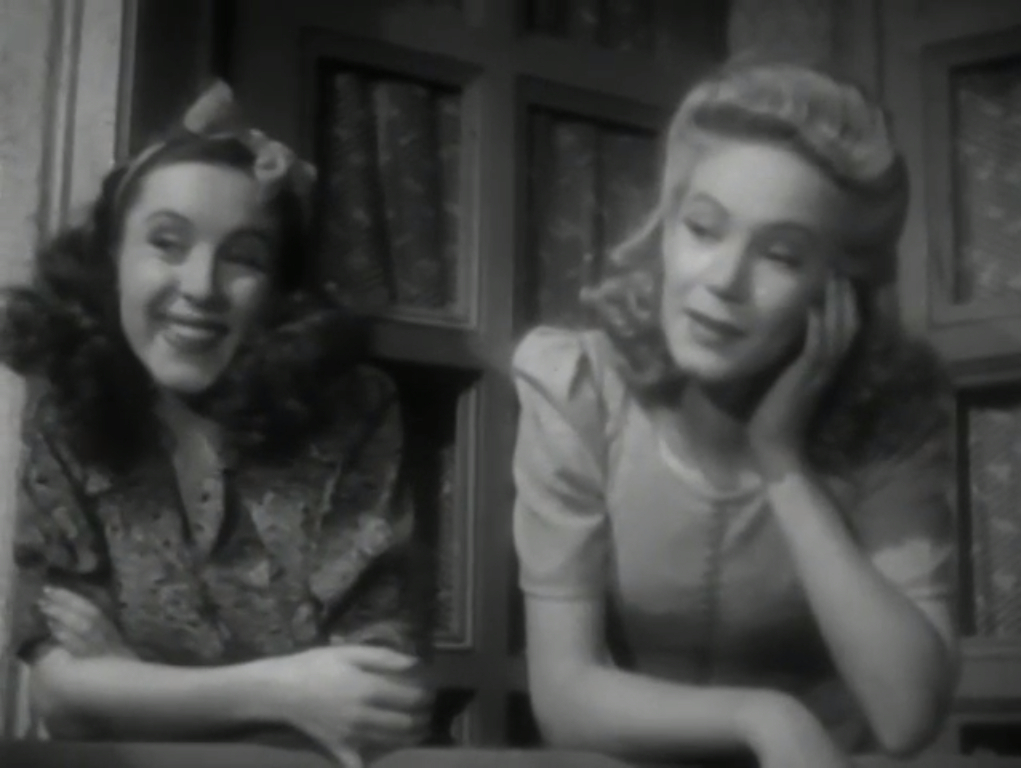
Douglas with Pita Amor (left) in Tentación (1943)

- Cinco fueron escogidos (1943)
- The War of the Pastries (1944)
- The Mulatta of Cordoba (1945)
- The White Monk (1945)
- Ecija's Seven Children (1947)
- The Secret of Juan Palomo (1947)
- Angelitos negros (1948)
- The Little House (1950)
- La dama del alba (1950)
- Rosauro Castro (1950)
- Girls in Uniform (1951)
- Beauty Salon (1951)
- Women's Prison (1951)
- Stolen Paradise (1951)
- The Absentee (1952)
- Forbidden Fruit (1953)
- The Unfaithful (1953)
- The Price of Living (1954)
- Cruz de amor (1970)

== Bibliography ==
- Paco Ignacio Taibo. María Félix: 47 pasos por el cine. Bruguera, 2008.
