= Las señoritas Vivanco =

1959 film

Las Señoritas Vivanco
- Directed by: Mauricio de la Serna
- Written by: Juan de la Cabada, Elena Garro, Josefina Vicens.
- Produced by: Jesús Grovas
- Starring: Sara García; Prudencia Grifell; Pedro Armendáriz; Ana Luisa Peluffo; Manolo Fábregas
- Cinematography: Ezequiel Carrasco, José Ortiz Ramos
- Edited by: Rafael Ceballos, Alfredo Rosas Priego
- Music by: Sergio Guerrero
- Release date: 9 April 1959
- Running time: 109 minutes
- Country: Mexico
- Language: Spanish

Las señoritas Vivanco ("The Vivanco Ladies") is a 1959 Mexican comedy film directed by Mauricio de la Serna and starring Sara García, Prudencia Grifell, Pedro Armendáriz, Ana Luisa Peluffo and Manolo Fábregas. It was followed by a sequel released in 1961, El proceso de las señoritas Vivanco.

== Cast ==
- Pedro Armendáriz - Gen. Inocencio Torrentera
- Ana Luisa Peluffo - Maruja Valverde
- Manolo Fábregas - Inspector Jorge Saldaña
- Sara García - Hortensia Vivanco y de la Vega
- Prudencia Grifell - Teresa Vivanco y de la Vega
- Marina Camacho - Lola
- José Luis Jiménez - don Esteban
- María Teresa Rivas - Adelaida Covarrubias
- Miguel Manzano - Eleuterio Covarrubias
- Aurora Alvarado - Cristina
- Rafael del Río - Jaimito
- Emma Arvizu - Raquel
- Claudio Brook - William
- Eugenia Galindo - Maria
- Carmen Salas - Trini
