= Brave Pigeon =

1961 comedy film

- Spanish: Paloma brava
- Directed by: Rogelio A. González
- Written by: Janet Alcoriza; Fernando Galiana
- Produced by: Sergio Kogan
- Starring: Miguel Aceves Mejía; Rosita Quintana; Sara García
- Cinematography: Víctor Herrera
- Edited by: Jorge Bustos
- Music by: Gustavo César Carrión
- Production company: Estudios Churubusco Azteca S.A.
- Distributed by: Azteca Films Inc.
- Release date: January 12, 1961 (Mexico)
- Running time: 80 min
- Country: Mexico
- Language: Spanish

Brave Pigeon (Spanish: Paloma brava) is a 1961 Mexican film written by Janet Alcoriza, directed by Rogelio A. González and starring Rosita Quintana, Miguel Aceves Mejía and Sara García.

It was one of three ranchera comedies that year by González based on screenplays by Janet Alcoriza (formerly Raquel Rojas) and Fernando Galiana. The other two were El buena suerte, also with Aceves Mejía, and El jinete negro, a western parody with an early appearance by Mauricio Garcés.

== Cast ==
- Rosita Quintana as Marta/Laura
- Miguel Aceves Mejía as Gabino Morones
- Sara García as Doña Popotita
- Roberto Ramírez Garza as Chava
- Alfredo Varela Jr. as Doctor (as Varelita)
- Guillermo Hernández as Polo Lobo (as Lobo Negro)
- Manuel Vergara Manver as the superintendent Don Nabor
- José Chávez as Hermano Lobo
- Sergio Llanes
- Victorio Blanco as old cancionero
- Felipe del Castillo as Chava's patient
