= Tropic Holiday =

1938 film by Theodore Reed

- Directed by: Theodore Reed
- Written by: Frank R. Butler; Don Hartman; Jack Moffitt
- Starring: Bob Burns; Dorothy Lamour; Ray Milland; Martha Raye
- Cinematography: Ted Tetzlaff
- Distributed by: Paramount Pictures
- Release date: July 1, 1938
- Running time: 78 minutes
- Country: United States
- Language: English

Tropic Holiday is a 1938 American musical film directed by Theodore Reed and starring Bob Burns, Dorothy Lamour and Ray Milland.

The film was nominated for the Academy Award's Best Scoring.

== Cast ==
- Bob Burns as Breck Jones
- Dorothy Lamour as Manuela
- Ray Milland as Ken Warren
- Martha Raye as Midge Miller
- Binnie Barnes as Marilyn Joyce
- Tito Guizar as Ramón
- Elvira Ríos as Rosa
- Roberto Soto as Roberto
- Michael Visaroff as Felipe
- Bobbie Moya as Pepito
- Fortunio Bonanova as Barrera
- Matt McHugh as Joe
- Pepito Pérez as Chico
- Chris-Pin Martin as Pancho
