= Fernando Soto (Mexican actor) =

Mexican actor (1911–1980)

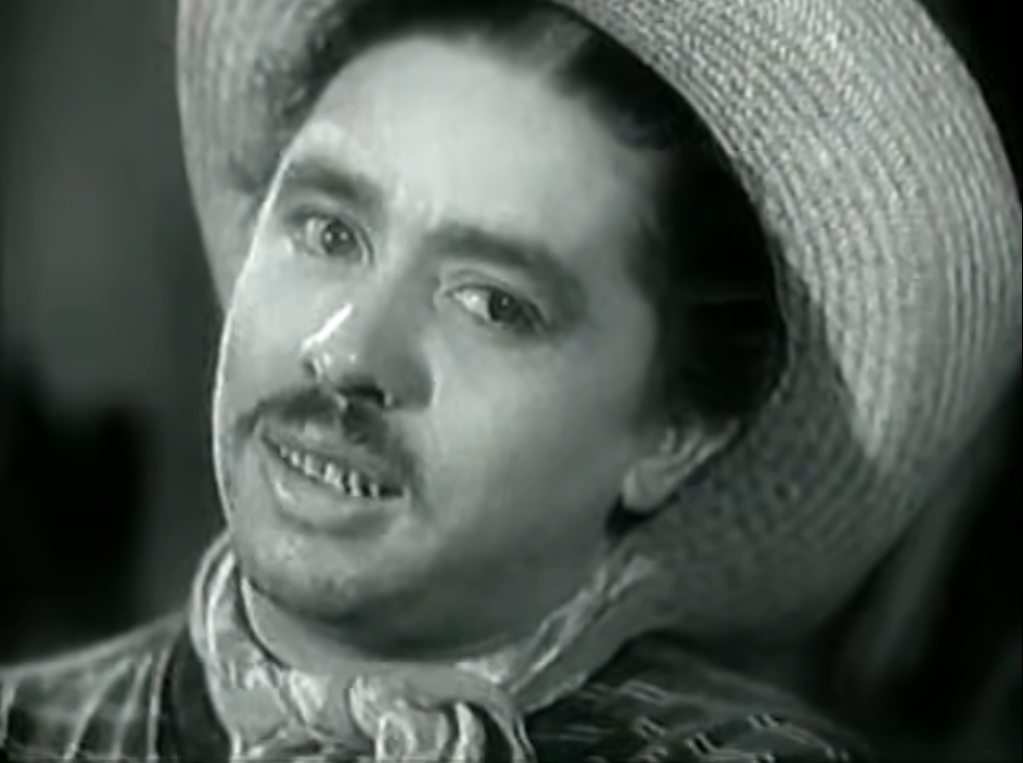
- Fernando Soto in Humo en los ojos (1946)
- Born: 15 April 1911; Puebla, Mexico
- Died: 11 May 1980 (aged 69); Mexico City, Mexico
- Occupation: Actor
- Years active: 1938-1977

Fernando Soto Astol (15 April 1911 – 11 May 1980), known as Mantequilla, was a Mexican actor and comedian. He appeared in more than one hundred films from 1938 to 1977. He was the son of the also comedian actor, Roberto Soto.

== Selected filmography ==
Year	Title	Role	Notes
1938	Beautiful Mexico		
1941	Neither Blood nor Sand		
1943	The Rebel		
1944	The Daughter of the Regiment		
1946	Humo en los ojos		
1946	The Queen of the Tropics		
1946	Champion Without a Crown		
1947	The Three Garcias		
1947	I Am a Charro of Rancho Grande		
1947	Strange Appointment		
1947	Felipe Was Unfortunate		
1947	The Golden Boat		
1947	The Garcias Return		
1948	Corner Stop		
1948	The Shadow of the Bridge		
1948	The Newlywed Wants a House		
1948	Los tres huastecos		
1948	Juan Charrasqueado		
1948	Spurs of Gold		
1949	Dicen que soy mujeriego		
1950	Orange Blossom for Your Wedding		
1950	Cuando los hijos odian		
1950	Wife or Lover		
1950	My Favourite		
1951	Daughter of Deceit		
1951	Los enredos de una gallega		
1951	La Estatua de carne		
1952	Pepe the Bull		
1953	You've Got Me By the Wing		
1953	The Island of Women		
1953	Your Memory and Me		
1953	Pain		
1953	The Second Woman		
1953	The Sixth Race		
1953	I Am Very Macho		
1954	Illusion Travels by Streetcar		
1955	Tú y las nubes		
1956	The Bandits of Cold River		
1958	La Venenosa		
1959	Amor se dice cantando		
1960	Two Cheap Husbands		
1961	El analfabeto		
1971	Tacos al carbón		
1972	Jalisco nunca pierde		
1973	Tu camino y el mio		
1974	Fé, Esperanza y Caridad		
1975	La presidenta municipal		
1977	Como gallos de pelea		
