= Stolen Paradise (1951 film) =

1951 film by Julio Bracho

- Directed by: Julio Bracho
- Written by: Julio Bracho; Celestino Gorostiza; Arduino Maiuri; Mauricio de la Serna; Mane Sierra
- Produced by: Salvador Elizondo; Mauricio de la Serna
- Starring: Arturo de Córdova; Irasema Dilián; María Douglas
- Cinematography: Alex Phillips
- Edited by: Jorge Busto
- Music by: Gonzalo Curiel
- Production company: Clasa Films Mundiales
- Release date: 4 October 1951
- Running time: 101 minutes
- Country: Mexico
- Language: Spanish

Stolen Paradise (Spanish: Paraíso robado) is a 1951 Mexican drama film directed by Julio Bracho and starring Arturo de Córdova, Irasema Dilián and María Douglas.

== Cast ==
- Arturo de Córdova as Doctor Carlos de la Vega
- Irasema Dilián as Marcela
- María Douglas as Lucia
- Charles Rooner as Don Gustavo
- Ramón Gay as Julio Solorzano
- Juan Orraca as Inspector romero
- Enrique Díaz 'Indiano' as Doctor Silva
- Jesús Valero as Cura
- Mariano Requena
- Luisa Rooner as Abuela de Marcela

== Bibliography ==
- Celestino Gorostiza. Teatro completo. Univ. J. Autónoma de Tabasco, 2004.
