= Carlos Navarro (Mexican actor) =

Mexican actor

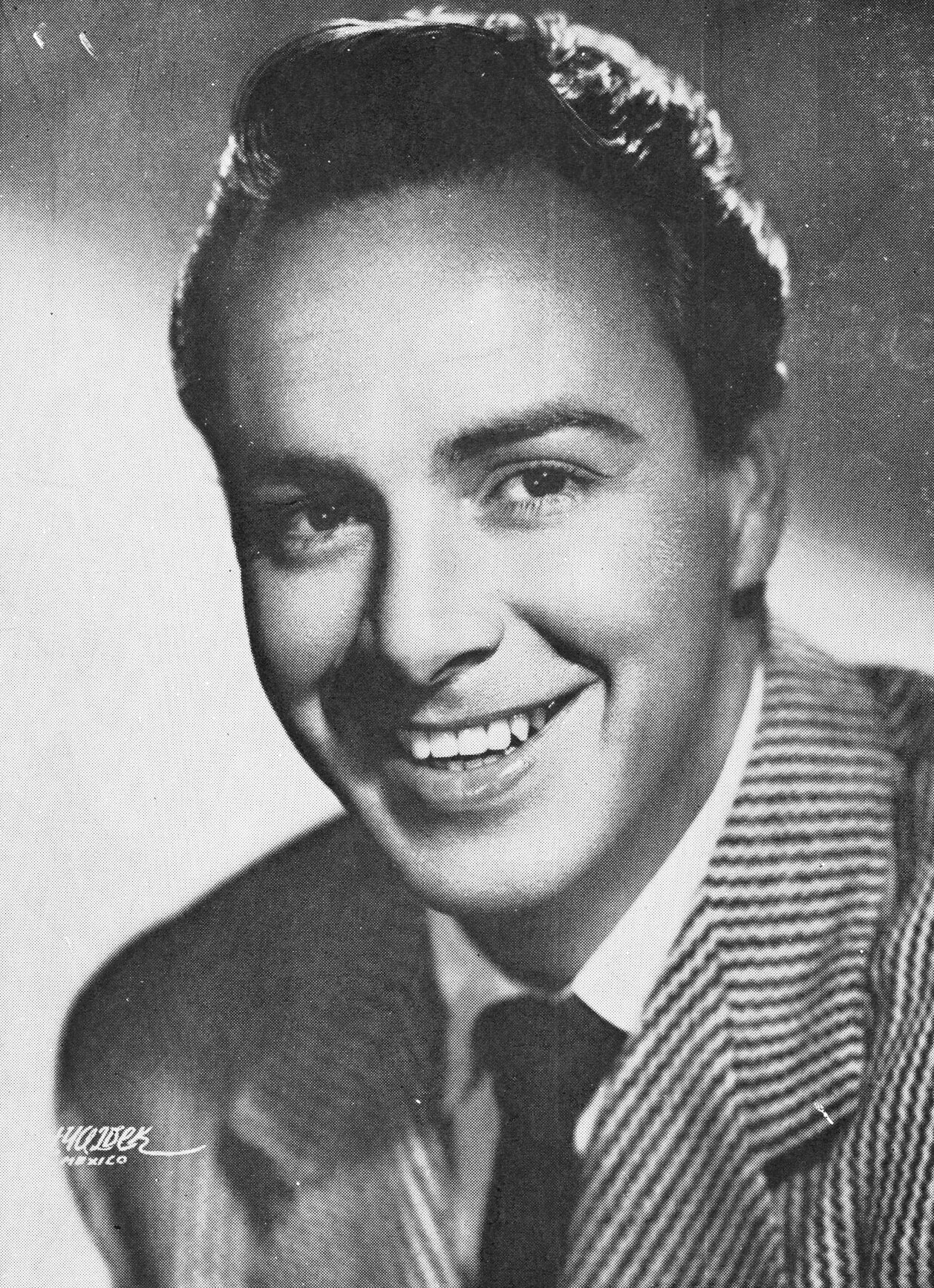
- Carlos Navarro in 1954
- Born: 21 February 1921; Mexico City, Mexico
- Died: 12 February 1969 (aged 47); Mexico City, Mexico
- Occupation: Actor
- Years active: 1946–1969 (film and television)

Carlos Navarro (1921–1969) was a Mexican film and television actor.

He won the Ariel Award for Best Supporting Actor for his appearance in the 1951 film Doña Perfecta. He appeared in a number of telenovelas.

== Selected filmography ==
- Ramona (1946)
- Another Spring (1950)
- Rosauro Castro (1950)
- The Dangerous Age (1950)
- Doña Perfecta (1951)
- Angélica (1952)
- The Coward (1953)
- Four Hours Before His Death (1953)
- Illusion Travels by Streetcar (1954)
- The Brave One (1956)
- Corazón salvaje (1956)
- To Each His Life (1960)
- The Adolescents (1968)

== See also ==
- List of Mexican actors

== Bibliography ==
- Baugh, Scott L. Latino American Cinema: An Encyclopedia of Movies, Stars, Concepts, and Trends. ABC-CLIO, 2012.
- Goble, Alan. The Complete Index to Literary Sources in Film. Walter de Gruyter, 1999.
- Hall, Linda. Dolores del Río: Beauty in Light and Shade. Stanford University Press, 2013.
