= Roberto Soto (actor) =

Mexican film actor

- Born: 7 June 1888; Zacatecas, Mexico
- Died: 18 July 1960 (aged 72); Mexico City, Mexico
- Occupation: Actor
- Years active: 1919–1952 (film)

Roberto Soto (1888–1960) was a Mexican actor and comedian. He appeared during the Golden Age of Mexican Cinema in co-starring or supporting roles. He was the father of the also comedian actor, Fernando Soto "Mantequilla".

== Selected filmography ==
- Tropic Holiday (1938)
- Carnival in the Tropics (1942)
- La corte de faraón (1944)
- Adam, Eve and the Devil (1945)
- The Newlywed Wants a House (1948)
- ¡Ay, Palillo, no te rajes! (1948)
- El embajador (1949)
- It's a Sin to Be Poor (1950)
- La estatua de carne (1951)
- The Atomic Fireman (1952)

== Bibliography ==
- Mariño, Cecilia Nuria Gil & Miranda, Laura. Identity Mediations in Latin American Cinema and Beyond: Culture, Music and Transnational Discourses. Cambridge Scholars Publishing, 2019.
- Mora, Carl J. Mexican Cinema: Reflections of a Society, 1896-2004. McFarland, 2005.
