= Aunt Candela =

1948 film

- Directed by: Julián Soler
- Written by: Alfredo Salazar; Julián Soler
- Produced by: Abel Salazar
- Starring: Sara García; Abel Salazar; Manolo Fábregas
- Cinematography: Jorge Stahl Jr.
- Edited by: Jorge Bustos
- Music by: Rosalío Ramírez
- Release date: 1 December 1948
- Running time: 85 minutes
- Country: Mexico
- Language: Spanish

Aunt Candela (Spanish: Tía Candela) is a 1948 Mexican comedy film directed by Julián Soler and starring Sara García, Abel Salazar and Manolo Fábregas. The film's sets were designed by the art director Jorge Fernández.

== Cast ==
- Sara García as Candelaria López y Polvorilla, Tía Candela
- Abel Salazar
- Manolo Fábregas
- Esperanza Issa
- Florencio Castelló
- José Torvay

== Bibliography ==
- Agrasánchez, Rogelio. Cine Mexicano: Posters from the Golden Age, 1936-1956. Chronicle Books, 2001.
- Riera, Emilio García. Historia documental del cine mexicano: 1946-1948. Universidad de Guadalajara, 1992.
