= Pablo and Carolina =

1957 film

- Directed by: Mauricio de la Serna
- Written by: Arduino Maiuri; Mauricio de la Serna
- Produced by: Antonio Matouk; Angélica Ortiz
- Starring: Pedro Infante; Irasema Dilián; Alejandro Ciangherotti
- Cinematography: J. Carlos Carbajal
- Edited by: Carlos Savage
- Music by: Manuel Esperón; Ramiro Hernández; Cuco Sánchez
- Production company: Producciones Matouk
- Release date: 25 April 1957
- Running time: 96 minutes
- Country: Mexico
- Language: Spanish

Pablo and Carolina (Spanish:Pablo y Carolina) is a 1957 Mexican romantic comedy film directed by Mauricio de la Serna, and starring Pedro Infante and Irasema Dilián. This film was premiered after Infante's death.

The film's sets were designed by art director Manuel Fontanals. It was shot in Eastmancolor.

== Cast ==
- Pedro Infante as Pablo Garza
- Irasema Dilián as Carolina Cirol
- Alejandro Ciangherotti as Enrique
- Eduardo Alcaraz as Guillermo, mayordomo
- Miguel Ángel Ferriz as Señor Cirol
- Fanny Schiller as Señora Cirol
- Arturo Soto Rangel as Señor Pablo Garza, abuelo de Pablo
- Josefina Leiner as Lucila
- Kika Meyer as Señorita directora
- Yolanda Ortiz as Estudiante instituto
- Constanza Hool as Chica baila con Pablo
- Chela Nájera as Profesora
- Lupe Legorreta as Thelma
- Nicolás Rodríguez as Dr. Julio Rodríguez
- Salvador Quiroz
- Marcela Daviland as Pasajera en avion
- Alicia Missioner
- Telma Botello
- Victor Jordan
- Martha Patricia Rosado as Teresa, estudiante instituto
- Enrique Zambrano as Alfredo
- Lorenzo de Rodas as Carlos
- Elena Julián as Luisa Morán
- Alicia del Lago as Estudiante instituto
- Genaro de Alba as Rodolfo
- Diana Ochoa as Profesora
- Federico Curiel as Rolando, mayordomo Enrique
- Daniel Arroyo as Espectador teatro
- Irma Dorantes as Secretaria Pablo Garza
- Maruja Grifell as María, secretaria
- Ana María Hernández as Adela, secretaria
- Héctor Mateos as Señor Pablo Garza, padre de Pablo
- Alejandra Meyer as Estudiante instituto
- Inés Murillo as María, portera instituto

== Bibliography ==
- Rogelio Agrasánchez. Mexican Movies in the United States: A History of the Films, Theaters, and Audiences, 1920-1960. McFarland & Company, 2006.
