= Don't Marry My Wife =

1947 film

- Mapy Cortés, José Cibrián and Conchita Gentil Arcos (left to right)
- Directed by: Fernando Cortés
- Written by: José Baviera; Neftali Beltrán; Fernando Cortés; Carlos Sampelayo
- Starring: Mapy Cortés; José Cibrián; Antonio Badú
- Cinematography: José Ortiz Ramos
- Edited by: Gloria Schoemann
- Music by: Ernesto Cortázar; Manuel Esperón
- Distributed by: Clasa-Mohme
- Release date: 27 February 1947
- Running time: 80 minutes
- Country: Mexico
- Language: Spanish

Don't Marry My Wife (Spanish: No te cases con mi mujer) is a 1947 Mexican comedy film directed by Fernando Cortés and starring Mapy Cortés, José Cibrián and Antonio Badú. It was shot at the Churubusco Studios in Mexico City.

== Cast ==
- Mapy Cortés
- José Cibrián
- Antonio Badú
- Alfredo Varela
- José Pidal
- Conchita Gentil Arcos
- Francisco Reiguera
- Jorge Rachini
- Joaquín Cordero

== Bibliography ==
- Gubern, Román. Cine español en el exilio, 1936-1939. Lumen, 1976.
- Riera, Emilio García. Historia documental del cine mexicano: 1946–1948. Universidad de Guadalajara, 1992.
