= José Cibrián =

Argentine actor (1916–2002)

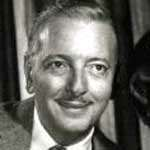
- Born: 25 February 1916; Buenos Aires, Argentina
- Died: 28 December 2002 (aged 86)
- Years active: 1940–1981

José Cibrián (25 February 1916 – 28 December 2002), nicknamed Pepe, was an Argentine actor. Born in Buenos Aires, where he also died, he has an extensive filmography, including well-received movies such as Pájaro loco and La Cigarra no es un bicho. He starred in over 45 films between 1940 and 1981.

== Filmography ==
- Amor de mis Amores (1940)
- Jesús de Nazareth (1942) ... Jesús
- Santa (1943) ... Hipolito
- El Hombre de La Mascara de Hierro (1943)
- El Globo de Cantoya (1943)
- Asi son Ellas (1944)
- La Trepadora (1944)
- The Daughter of the Regiment (1944)
- Tribunal de Justicia (1944)
- The Lieutenant Nun (1944)
- El Secreto de la solterona (1945)
- Soltera y con gemelos (1945)
- Su Gran Ilusión (1945)
- Como tu Ninguna (1946)
- Más allá del Amor (1946)
- Los Maridos Engañan de 7 a 9 (1946)
- El Desquite (1947)
- Don't Marry My Wife (1947)
- La Mujer que quiere a dos (1947)
- The Earring (1951)
