= Sara Montes =

Mexican actress (born 1926)

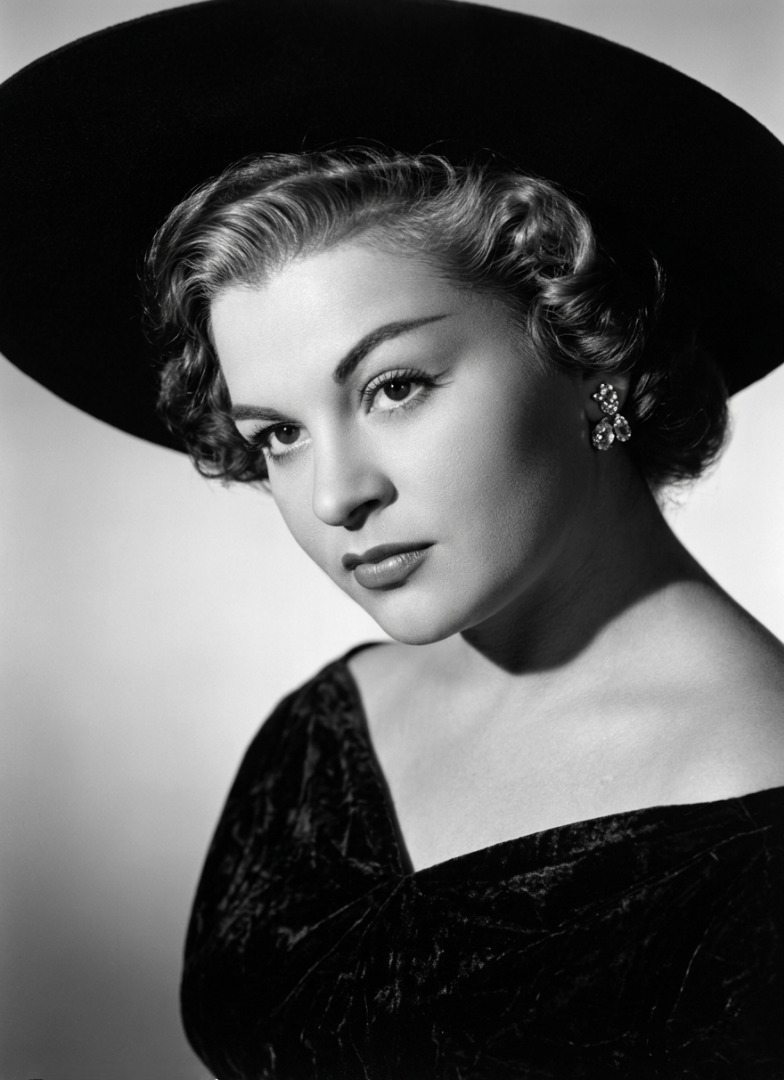
- Montes in 1954
- Born: 7 June 1926 (age 100); Morelia, Michoacán, Mexico
- Occupation: Actress
- Years active: 1946–2016

Sara Montes (born 7 June 1926) is a Mexican actress.

== Selected filmography ==
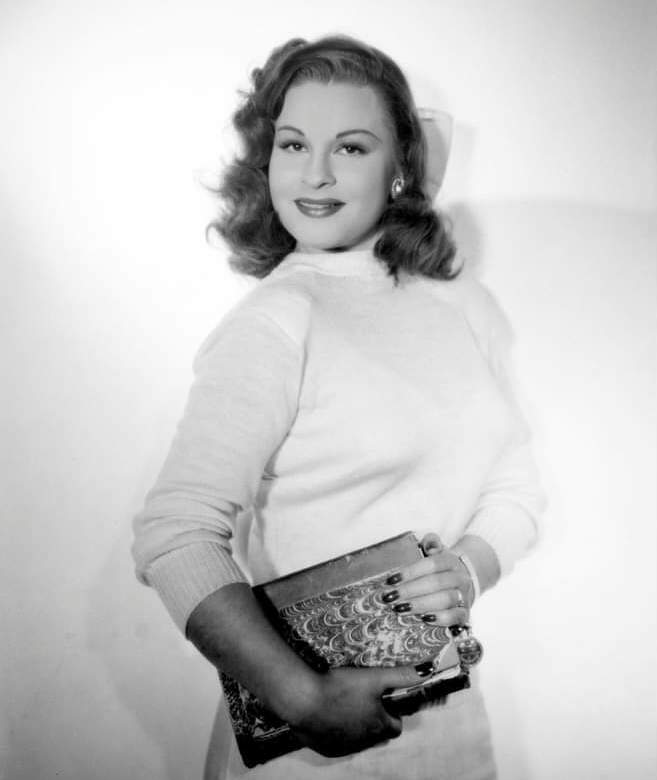
Montes in the 1950s

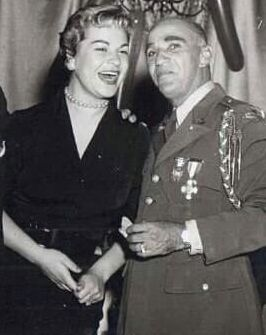
Montes with Petán Trujillo, c. 1957–59

- The Tiger of Jalisco (1947)
- Los tres García (1947)
- Angels of the Arrabal (1949)
- Cuatro contra el mundo (1950)
- Nosotras las taquígrafas (1950)
- Los enredos de una gallega (1951)
- Canasta uruguaya (1951)
- The Spot of the Family (1953)
- The Life of Agustín Lara (1959)

== See also ==
- List of centenarians (actors, filmmakers and entertainers)

== Bibliography ==
- Rogelio Agrasánchez. Guillermo Calles: A Biography of the Actor and Mexican Cinema Pioneer. McFarland, 2010.
