= ¡Mis abuelitas... nomás! =

- Directed by: Mauricio de la Serna
- Written by: Víctor Manuel Castro
- Starring: Antonio Espino «Clavillazo», Sara García, Prudencia Grifell, Rosa de Castilla, Dacia González
- Release date: 1961
- Running time: 95 minute
- Country: Mexico
- Language: Spanish

¡Mis abuelitas... nomás! ("My Grandmothers... Just!") is a 1961 Mexican comedy film written by Víctor Manuel Castro, directed by Mauricio de la Serna and starring Antonio Espino «Clavillazo», Sara García, Prudencia Grifell, Rosa de Castilla and Dacia González.
