= Martha Triana =

Background information
- Born: Eva Luz Rodríguez Burgos; 5 April 1920; Torreón, Coahuila, Mexico
- Died: 26 April 2011 (aged 91)
- Genres: Bolero
- Occupation: Singer
- Instrument: Vocals
- Label: Peerless

Eva Luz Rodríguez Burgos (5 April 1920 – 26 April 2011), known professionally as Martha Triana, was a Mexican singer from Torreón, Coahuila.

A popular bolero performer of the 1940s, she recorded many 78 rpm singles for Peerless Records and sang on the famous Mexico City radio station XEW. "No vuelvo contigo", "Somos diferentes", and "Amor ciego" are some of her hits.

== Discography ==
=== Compilation albums ===
- Vuelven los boleros de oro (Peerless [Eco], 1974)
- 70 Años Peerless Una Historia Musical (Peerless, 2003)
