= El buena suerte =

1961 film

- Directed by: Rogelio A. González
- Written by: Janet Alcoriza; Fernando Galiana
- Starring: Sara García
- Cinematography: Víctor Herrera
- Edited by: Jorge Busto
- Release date: 1961
- Country: Mexico
- Language: Spanish

El buena suerte ("The Good Luck") is a 1961 Mexican film directed by Rogelio A. González with Miguel Aceves Mejía and Sara García. It was one of three ranchera comedies that year by González based on screenplays by Janet Alcoriza (formerly Raquel Rojas) and Fernando Galiana. The other two were Paloma brava, also with Aceves Mejía and Sara Garcia, and El Jinete Negro, a western parody with an early appearance by Mauricio Garcés.
