= Antonio Badú =

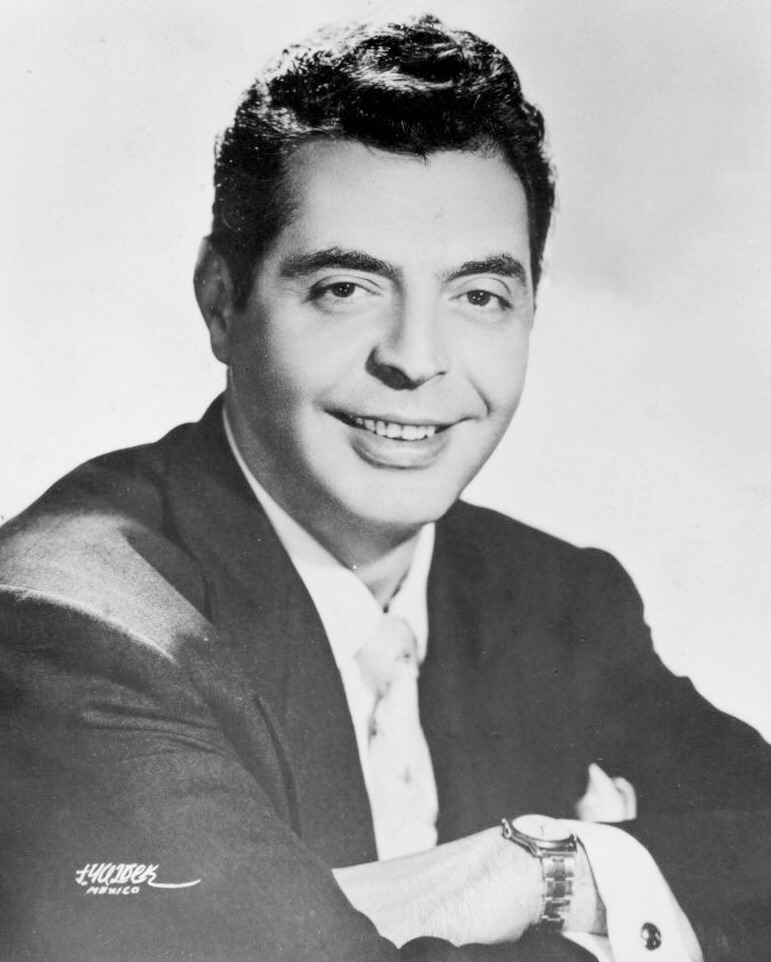
- Born: 13 August 1914; Real del Monte, Hildalgo, Mexico
- Died: June 29, 1993 (aged 78); Mexico City, Mexico
- Occupation: Actor
- Years active: 1938 - 1977 (film)

Antonio Badú (August 13, 1914 – June 29, 1993) was a Mexican film actor and producer. He appeared in more than sixty films during his career, which began during the Golden Age of Mexican cinema.

== Filmography ==
Year	Title	Role	Notes
1938	Padre Mercader		
1938	Sangre en las montañas	Andrés	
1940	El gavilán	Licenciado Gustavo Silva	
1940	Por una mujer		
1940	Mala yerba	Teniente	
1941	¡Ay Jalisco... no te rajes!	Singer	
1942	Virgen de medianoche	Rubén	
1943	La feria de las flores	Valentín Mancera	
1943	¡Arriba las mujeres!	Zaid Bazur	
1943	El misterioso señor Marquina	Benedicto	
1944	La Mujer sin Alma	Enrique Ferrer	
1944	Adiós, Mariquita linda		
1945	Me he de comer esa tuna	Ernesto Solana	
1945	Una canción en la noche		
1946	Cantaclaro	Florentino Coronado Cantaclaro	
1946	¡Ay qué rechula es Puebla!	Miguel Salvatierra	
1946	Por um Amor		
1946	Ramona		
1947	Don't Marry My Wife		
1947	Strange Obsession		
1947	La mujer que quiere a dos		
1947	Felipe Was Unfortunate		
1947	Carita de cielo	Dr. Julio Conde	
1948	Ahí vienen los Mendoza	Antonio Mendoza	
1948	Enrédate y verás	Roberto	
1948	Las mañanitas	Juan Pedro	
1949	Only Veracruz Is Beautiful	Ramón Fernández	
1949	Hypocrite	Pepe	
1949	Cuatro vidas		
1950	Love for Love	Miguel Zárate	
1950	Mariachis	Andrés	
1950	My Favourite	Enrique	
1950	Vagabunda	Gilberto: El Gato	
1950	También de dolor se canta	Antonio Badú	
1951	The Chicken Hawk	Luis Lepe	
1951	Corazón de fiera	El chato René / Luis del Rosal	
1951	A Gringo Girl in Mexico	Pablo Rodríguez	
1951	Tercio de quites	Salvador Ponce 'El Tapatío'	
1952	Paco the Elegant	Paco Robledo, Paco el Elegante	
1952	Sangre en el barrio	Juan Lorenzo Vélez	
1952	The Children of Maria Morales	Luis Morales	
1952	Póker de ases	Antonio	
1953	The Spot of the Family	Antonio Vargas; Toño	
1953	Genius and Figure	Antonio Vargas	
1953	Pain	Carlos Melgar	
1954	Black Ace	Julio / Germán Acaro	
1954	Cain y Abel	Cain de los Santos	
1955	El pueblo sin Dios	Ricardo Galarza	
1955	El charro inmortal	Cantante	
1956	Los margaritos	Margarito Hernández I	
1957	Te odio y te quiero		
1958	Los mujeriegos	Antonio	
1958	Ay... Calypso no te rajes!		
1958	Tres desgraciados con suerte		
1958	El gran espectáculo	Fernando	
1959	Los Santos Reyes		
1959	México nunca duerme	Buenaventura	
1959	Las coronelas	Capitán	
1959	The Life of Agustín Lara		
1960	The White Renegade		
1960	Los resbalosos	Pedro	
1961	Tres Romeos y una Julieta		
1961	El Bronco Reynosa		
1964	La vendedora de amor	Marcos el inmaculado	
1967	Bromas, S.A.		
1968	El día de la boda	Arturo	
1968	Las posadas		
1969	El matrimonio es como el demonio	Arturo	
1969	Las fieras	Las fieras	

== Bibliography ==
- Sergio de la Mora. Cinemachismo: Masculinities and Sexuality in Mexican Film. University of Texas Press, 2009.
