= Creo en ti =

1960 film

- Directed by: Alfonso Corona Blake
- Release date: 1960
- Running time: 95 minute
- Country: Mexico
- Language: Spanish

Creo en ti is a 1960 Mexican film.

== Cast ==
- Jorge Mistral as Roberto
- Libertad Lamarque as Estela
- Julia Sandoval as Alicia
- Víctor Junco as Fernando
- Alberto Bello as Don Octavio
