= Rogelio A. González =

Mexican film director (1920–1984)

- Born: 27 January 1920; Monterrey, Nuevo León, Mexico
- Died: 22 May 1984 (aged 64); Saltillo, Coahuila, Mexico
- Occupations: Film director Screenwriter; Actor
- Years active: 1945–1983

Rogelio A. González (January 27, 1920 – May 22, 1984) was a Mexican film director, screenwriter, and actor. González directed 70 films, was nominated for a Silver Ariel four times, and was also nominated for a Golden Ariel for La culta dama (1957). His film Hambre nuestra de cada día was entered into the 1st Moscow International Film Festival.

He was a member of the Academia Mexicana de la Lengua. In 1952, the Agrupación de Críticos de Teatro de México awarded him the Juan Ruiz de Alarcón Prize for his play El color de nuestra piel. France awarded him the Legion of Honor.

== Selected filmography ==
- The Three Garcias (1947)
- The Garcias Return (1947)
- Chachita from Triana (1947)
- The Black Sheep (1949)
- Over the Waves (1950)
- Anacleto Gets Divorced (1950)
- You Shall Not Covet Thy Son's Wife (1950)

=== As director ===
- 1951: Love Was Her Sin
- 1951: The Chicken Hawk
- 1952: Now I Am Rich
- 1952: Hambre nuestra de cada día
- 1952: Las interesadas
- 1952: A Place Near Heaven
- 1953: I Want to Live
- 1953: The Vagabond
- 1953: Made for Each Other
- 1954: El mil amores
- 1954: Nuevo amanecer
- 1955: Escuela de vagabundos / School for Tramps
- 1955: La vida no vale nada
- 1956: canto y esperanza Pueblo
- 1956: El inocente
- 1956: Los bandidos de Río Frío / The Bandits of Cold River
- 1956: Una movida chueca
- 1957: Vainilla, bronce y morir (Una mujer más)
- 1957: La culta dama
- 1957: Mi influyente mujer
- 1957: Pies de gato
- 1958: Escuela de rateros
- 1958: Mujer en condominio
- 1959: Ando volando bajo
- 1959: Dos fantasmas y una muchacha
- 1959: El hombre del alazán
- 1959: El que con niños se acuesta
- 1959: Nacida para amar
- 1960: Conquistador de la luna
- 1960: El Esqueleto de la señora Morales / Skeleton of Mrs. Morales
- 1960: La nave de los monstruos / The Ship of Monsters
- 1960: Los fanfarrones
- 1961: Amorcito corazón
- 1961: ¿Dónde estás corazón?
- 1961: El buena suerte
- 1961: El jinete negro
- 1961: En cada feria un amor
- 1961: La diligencia de la muerte
- 1961: Paloma brava / Brave Pigeon
- 1965: Río Hondo
- 1966: Alias el Rata
- 1966: La Valentina
- 1967: Adios cuñado!
- 1967: Alma Grande en el desierto
- 1967: Chanoc
- 1967: La mujer de a seis litros
- 1968: Dr. Satán y la magia negra
- 1968: La noche del halcón
- 1969: Al fin a solas
- 1969: Flor marchita
- 1970: El club de los suicidas
- 1970: La agonía de ser madre
- 1970: ¿Por qué nací mujer?
- 1971: La Güera Xóchitl
- 1971: La sangre enemiga
- 1971: Papa en onda
- 1971: Rosario
- 1972: La inocente
- 1972: Las vírgenes locas
- 1972: One Minute Before Death
- 1972: Por eso
- 1973: Vidita negra
- 1974: La recogida
- 1976: El hombre desnudo
- 1976: La india
- 1977: Sor tequila
- 1978: Los japoneses no esperan
- 1979: El tahúr
- 1981: D.F./Distrito Federal
- 1981: El gran perro muerto
- 1981: El sexo sentido
- 1983: México 2000
