= El proceso de las señoritas Vivanco =

- Directed by: Mauricio de la Serna
- Written by: Juan de la Cabada, Elena Garro, Josefina Vicens
- Produced by: Jesús Grovas
- Starring: Sara García; Prudencia Grifell; Manolo Fábregas
- Cinematography: Ezequiel Carrasco, José Ortiz Ramos
- Edited by: Rafael Ceballos, Alfredo Rosas Priego
- Music by: Sergio Guerrero
- Release date: 9 April 1961
- Running time: 109 minutes
- Country: Mexico
- Language: Spanish

El proceso de las señoritas Vivanco ("The Process of the Vivanco Girls") is a 1961 Mexican film directed by Maurcio de la Serna. Sequel to Las señoritas Vivanco (1959), it stars Sara García and Prudencia Grifell.

== Cast ==
- Sara García - Doña Hortensia Vivanco y de la Vega
- Prudencia Grifell - Doña Teresa Vivanco y de la Vega
- Manolo Fábregas - Jorge Saldaña / Ernestito
- José Luis Jiménez - Don Esteban Larios
- Aurora Alvarado - Cristina
- Rafael del Río - Jaimito
- Miguel Ángel Ferriz - Coronel Pedro Tejedo
- Carmen Salas - Trinidad Ortega (Trini)
- Manuel Arvide - Fiscal
- Miguel Arenas - Juez
- Luis Aceves Castañeda - General / Jefe de policía
- Celia Tejeda - La Mayora
- Celia Manzano - Inés, celadora
- Fanny Schiller - Doña Conchita
- Queta Lavat - Profesora de gimnasia
