= The Daughter of the Regiment (1944 film) =

1944 film

- Directed by: Jaime Salvador
- Written by: Neftali Beltrán; Jaime Salvador
- Produced by: Óscar Dancigers; Michael Salkind
- Starring: Mapy Cortés; José Cibrián; Fernando Soto "Mantequilla"
- Cinematography: Raúl Martínez Solares
- Edited by: Rafael Ceballos
- Music by: Rodolfo Halffter
- Production company: Águila Films
- Release date: 6 October 1944
- Running time: 97 minutes
- Country: Mexico
- Language: Spanish

The Daughter of the Regiment (Spanish: La hija del regimiento) is a 1944 Mexican musical comedy film directed by Jaime Salvador and starring Mapy Cortés, José Cibrián and Fernando Soto "Mantequilla". It was shot at the Clasa Studios in Mexico City. The film's sets were designed by the art director Manuel Fontanals. It was inspired by the comic opera The Daughter of the Regiment by Gaetano Donizetti.

== Cast ==
- Mapy Cortés as Rosaura
- José Cibrián as Teniente Orlando
- Federico Piñero as Teniente Filemón
- Consuelo Guerrero de Luna as Tía
- Virginia Zurí as Duquesa
- Fernando Soto "Mantequilla" as Sargento cartucho
- Luis G. Barreiro as Médico
- Eduardo Casado as Príncipe
- Lucila Molina as Nadia
- Roberto Meyer as Ministro
- Carlos Villarías as Alcalde
- Pedro Elviro as Boticario
- Fernando Cortés as Coronel Basilio

== Bibliography ==
- Gubern, Román. Cine español en el exilio, 1936-1939. Lumen, 1976.
- Riera, Emilio García. Historia documental del cine mexicano: 1943–1945. Universidad de Guadalajara, 1992.
