= Miguel Aceves Mejía =

Mexican actor and singer of ranchera

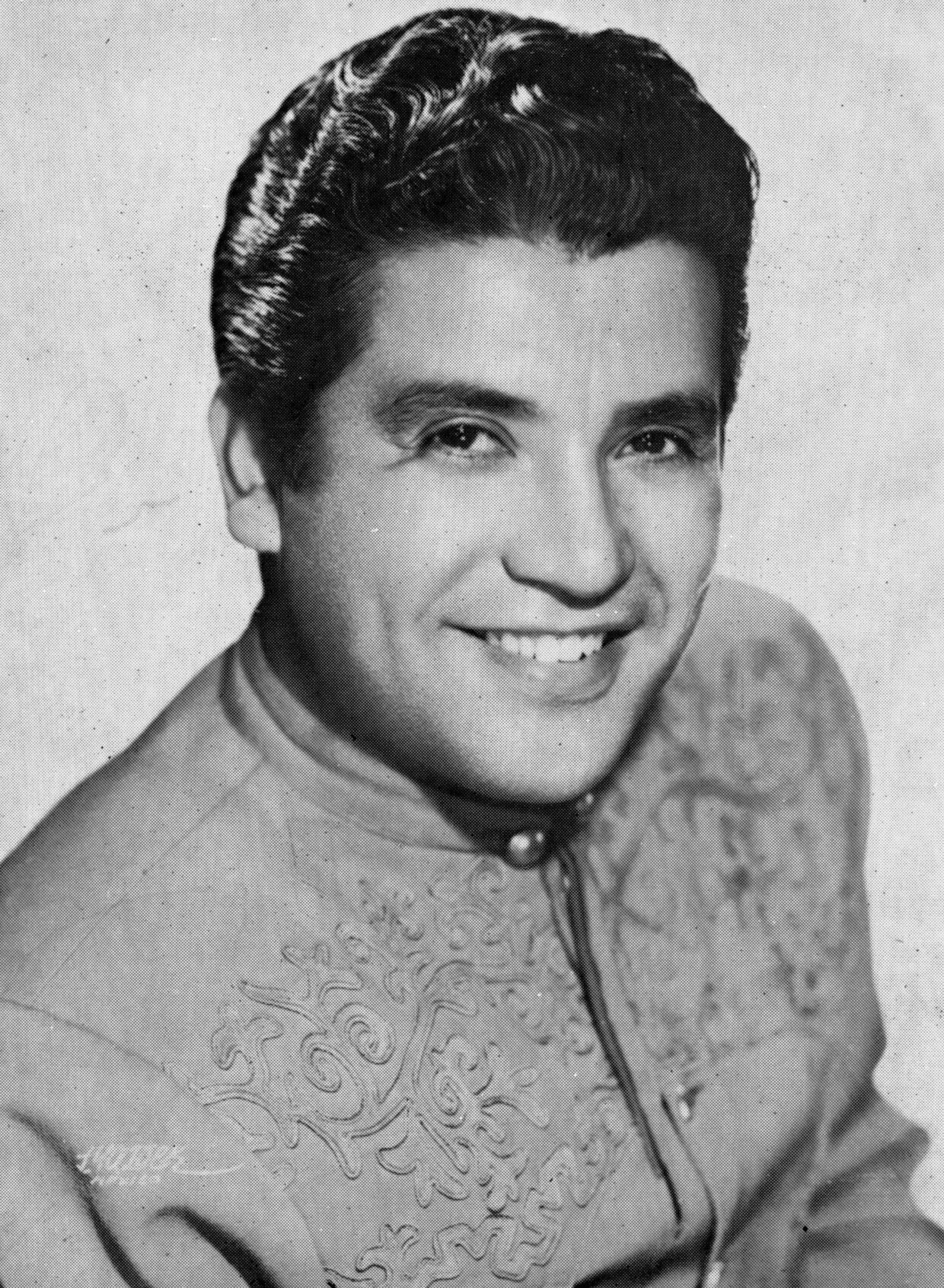
- Mejía in 1954

Background information
- Born: Miguel Aceves Mejía; 15 November 1915; El Paso, Texas
- Died: 6 November 2006 (aged 90) Mexico City, Mexico
- Occupations: Singer; actor
- Years active: 1945–2006
- Labels: RCA Victor; BMG Ariola; Sony Music Entertainment

Miguel Aceves Mejía (15 November 1915 – 6 November 2006) was a Mexican actor and singer, specialized in the musical genres of ranchera, mariachi, bolero and tango.

Miguel Aceves Mejía, or "the god of Ranchera" as he was popularly known, was born in El Paso, Texas, and was registered in Chihuahua City in the state of Chihuahua. He became a popular Mexican film star during its golden age and was widely regarded for his interpretations of various Mexican musical genres, as ranchera, mariachi, bolero and tango.

Originally part of a traveling theater company, Aceves began recording for the first time in 1938 with the trio Los Porteños. At the beginning of his career he interpreted mainly boleros, and ranchera rhythms. During his career he recorded more than 1600 songs on 140 discs and starred in 64 films.

He was considered one of the three greatest of all time with his close friends Pedro Infante and Jorge Negrete. He was the first Mexican folkloric singer to travel around the American continent with world tours, accompanied by the Mariachi Vargas of Tecatitlán. His fame took him in a tour to Spain where he filmed two movies with the great actress and singer La Faraona Lola Flores.

Among his greatest hits are El Pastor, La del Rebozo Blanco, Se Me Hizo Fácil, Yo Tenía un Chorro de Voz, Vaya con Dios, La Malagueña Salerosa, El Jinete, El Crucifijo de Piedra and Cuatro Caminos. He was noted for composing such songs as El Pescado Nadador and Oh, Gran Dios, even though his forté was primarily as a singer in his own right.

In 1945, Aceves began dedicating himself solely to singing and, following the deaths of Pedro Infante and Jorge Negrete, ventured into the world of cinema.

In 1959 he appeared in Amor se dice cantando.

Aceves died just a few days short of his 91st birthday on 6 November 2006 in Mexico City. As is tradition in Mexico, his body lay under the rotunda of the Palacio de las Bellas Artes (Palace of Fine Arts) in Mexico City. This honour is reserved for only the greatest Mexican figures of arts and letters.

== Filmography ==
- Los apuros de dos gallos (1963)
- Dos gallos y dos gallinas (1963)
- Los valientes no mueren (1962)
- Camino de la horca (1962)
- Si yo fuera millonario (1962)
- El asesino enmascarado (1962)
- El rey de la pistola (1962)
- Los cinco halcones (1962)
- Asesinos de la lucha libre (1962)
- Martín Santos el llanero (1962)
- Viva Chihuahua (1961)
- ¿Dónde estás, corazón (1961)
- El Buena Suerte (1961)
- Paloma brava (1961)
- Los fanfarrones (1960)
- Bala perdida (1960)
- ¡Viva quien sabe querer! (1960)
- Las canciones Unidas (1960)
- Viva la parranda (1960)
- Three Black Angels (1960)
- Me importa poco (1960)
- Dos tipos con suerte (1960)
- El ciclón (1959)
- Échame la culpa (1959)
- Mi niño, mi caballo y yo (1959)
- El cariñoso (1959)
- Amor se dice cantando (1959)
- Bajo el cielo de México (1958)
- Sabrás que te quiero (1958)
- Música de siempre (1958)
- Música en la noche (1958)
- Guitarras de medianoche (1958)
- Tú y la mentira (1958)
- Cuatro copas (1958)
- La feria de San Marcos (1958)
- El gallo colorado (1957)
- Mal de amores (1957)
- Hay ángeles con espuelas (1957)
- Que me toquen las golondrinas (1957)
- ¡Que seas feliz! (1956)
- Historia de un amor (1956)
- Limosna de amores (1955)
- To the Four Winds (1955)
- El águila negra en 'El vengador solitario' (1954)
- Camelia (1954)
- El asesino enmascarado (1953)
- The Lie (1952)
- Cartas a Ufemia (1952)
- We Maids (1951)
- She and I (1951)
- Por querer a una mujer (1951)
- Donde nacen los pobres (1950)
- De pecado en pecado (1948)
- Pecadora (1947)
- Rancho Alegre (1941)
