= Girls in Uniform (1951 film) =

1951 film

- Directed by: Alfredo B. Crevenna
- Written by: Christa Winsloe (play); Edmundo Báez; Egon Eis
- Produced by: Rodolfo Lowenthal
- Starring: Irasema Dilián; Marga López
- Cinematography: Ignacio Torres
- Edited by: Rafael Portillo
- Music by: Raúl Lavista
- Production company: Fama Films
- Release date: 31 May 1951
- Running time: 83 minutes
- Country: Mexico
- Language: Spanish

Girls in Uniform (Spanish: Muchachas de Uniforme) is a 1951 Mexican drama film directed by Alfredo B. Crevenna and starring Irasema Dilián and Marga López. It is a remake of the 1931 German film Girls in Uniform, set in a female boarding school.

== Cast ==
In alphabetical order

- Alicia Caro
- Lupe Carriles
- Irasema Dilián as Manuela Medina
- María Douglas
- Anabelle Gutiérrez
- Magda Guzmán
- Marga López as Lucila
- Patricia Morán
- Rosaura Revueltas
- Alicia Rodríguez

== Bibliography ==
- Ilana Dann Luna. Adapting Gender: Mexican Feminisms from Literature to Film. SUNY Press, 2018.
- Jan-Christopher Horak. "Muchachas de uniforme (1951)."
- Roberto Carlos Ortiz, "These Mexican Mädchen."
