= Mauricio de la Serna =

- Born: 26 November 1902; Mexico City, Mexico
- Died: 19 March 1986 (aged 83); Mexico City, Mexico
- Occupations: Film director, screenwriter and producer
- Years active: 1938–1979 (film)

Mauricio de la Serna (26 November 1902 – 19 March 1986) was a Mexican film director, screenwriter, and producer.

== Biography ==
De la Serna studied architecture, a profession he abandoned in 1938 to join the film industry as producer of the film Refugiados en Madrid ("Refugees in Madrid") by Alejandro Galindo (who was his friend and brother-in-law), a film in which de la Serna also wrote the story. De la Serna would continue working as a producer during the 1940s, not resuming his activity writing stories until 1950 with the film La edad peligrosa ("The Dangerous Age") by José Díaz Morales.

He headed the production company Films Mundiales and participated in the founding of Estudios Churubusco in 1944, along with Emilio Azcárraga Vidaurreta, Jesús Grovas, Juan Bustillo Oro, Miguel Zacarías and Fernando de Fuentes.

In 1951 he wrote his first script, Stolen Paradise, directed by Julio Bracho. In 1953, Luis Buñuel directed Illusion Travels by Streetcar, based on an argument by de la Serna and adapted by Buñuel, José Revueltas, Juan de la Cabada and Luis Alcoriza.

In 1955 he retired from production with the films La Desconocida ("The Unknown") and La rival ("The Rival"), both by Chano Urueta, and the same year he debuted as director-screenwriter with the film Caras nuevas ("New Faces"). From then on, he performed this double work in various films, continuing in the first half of the following decade.

He joined the General Society of Writers of Mexico (SOGEM) on November 30, 1967. Throughout his career, de la Serna was an active member of the directors' section of the Union of Workers in Film Production (STPC), but he also directed some films for the Motion Picture Industry Workers Union (STIC).

In the 1970s, de la Serna retired from the film industry and began working for television. In this medium, he held administrative positions on Canal 13, where he was in charge of acquiring foreign programs, and on Canal 11, where he established a cycle dedicated to showing Mexican films. In 1973 he provided his services for Televisa as coordinator of Post Production, Distribution and Exhibition of Televicine, where he remained until 1978. In addition, he alternately taught film direction at the Iberoamericana University and the University of Anáhuac.

With the production company Televicine, de la Serna briefly returned as director in 1979 with Nora la rebelde. De la Serna stated regarding his return to the film industry that "if I had not directed before, it was because the pornography and churrismo were bursting me", alluding to the then prevailing Mexican sex comedy genre.

== Selected filmography ==
- The League of Songs (1941)
- I Danced with Don Porfirio (1942)
- Resurrection (1943)
- The Dangerous Age (1950)
- Stolen Paradise (1951, screenwriter and producer only)
- Illusion Travels by Streetcar (1954, story only)
- Spring in the Heart (1956)
- Pablo and Carolina (1957)
- Los hijos del divorcio (1958)
- Las señoritas Vivanco (1959)
- ¡Mis abuelitas... no más! (1961)
- El proceso de las señoritas Vivanco (1961)
- Nora la rebelde (1979)

== Bibliography ==
- Pollarolo, Giovanna (2019). Nuevas aproximaciones a viejas polémicas: cine/literatura (in Spanish). Fondo Editorial de la PUCP. ISBN 978-612-317-504-7.
- Martínez Assad, Carlos (2013). La Ciudad de México que el cine nos dejó (in Spanish). Océano. ISBN 9786074006995.
- Aviña, Rafael (2007). David Silva: un campeón de mil rostros (in Spanish). UNAM. ISBN 978-970-32-3129-4.
- León Frías, Isaac (2019). Más allá de las lágrimas: Espacios habitables en el cine clásico de México y Argentina (in Spanish). Fondo Editorial Universidad de Lima. ISBN 978-9972-45-486-8.
