= Amparo Montes =

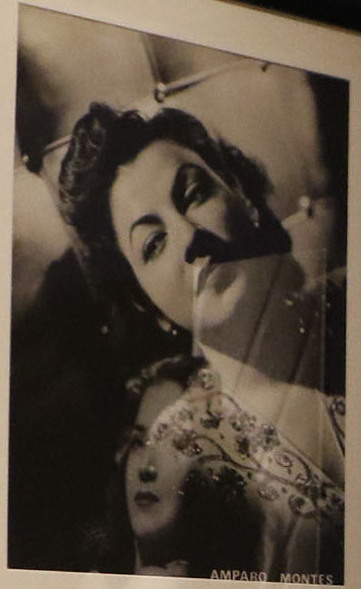
- Montes, c. 1950s

Background information
- Birth name: Amparo Meza Cruz
- Born: 24 April 1920; Tapachula, Chiapas, Mexico
- Died: 12 January 2002 (aged 81); Mexico City, Mexico
- Genres: Bolero
- Occupation: Singer
- Instrument: Vocals
- Years active: 1938–2002

Amparo Meza Cruz (24 April 1920 – 12 January 2002), known by her stage name Amparo Montes, was a Mexican singer, famous for her renditions of popular boleros by Agustín Lara and Gonzalo Curiel.
