= Jorge Bustos =

Mexican film editor

Jorge Bustos or Jorge Busto was a Mexican film editor. He was the brother of José W. Bustos.

== Selected filmography ==
- While Mexico Sleeps (1938)
- The Priest's Secret (1941)
- Father Gets Entangled Again (1942)
- I Danced with Don Porfirio (1942)
- Beautiful Michoacán (1943)
- Lightning in the South (1943)
- Resurrection (1943)
- The Spectre of the Bride (1943)
- Divorced (1943)
- Wild Flower (1943)
- The Lieutenant Nun (1944)
- The White Monk (1945)
- Twilight (1945)
- I Am a Fugitive (1946)
- Tragic Wedding (1946)
- The Devourer (1946)
- The Stronger Sex (1946)
- Caribbean Rose (1946)
- The Prince of the Desert (1947)
- If I'm to Be Killed Tomorrow (1947)
- Five Faces of Woman (1947)
- Fly Away, Young Man! (1947)
- Strange Obsession (1947)
- Bel Ami (1947)
- Aunt Candela (1948)
- Beau Ideal (1948)
- The Newlywed Wants a House (1948)
- The Genius (1948)
- Nocturne of Love (1948)
- The Magician (1949)
- Don't Love Me So Much (1949)
- Love in Every Port (1949)
- Tender Pumpkins (1949)
- Philip of Jesus (1949)
- Sinbad the Seasick (1950)
- The Man Without a Face (1950)
- My Favourite (1950)
- The Dangerous Age (1950)
- Duel in the Mountains (1950)
- To the Sound of the Mambo (1950)
- The Lost City (1950)
- Stolen Paradise (1951)
- She and I (1951)
- We Maids (1951)
- Women's Prison (1951)
- The Atomic Fireman (1952)
- The Woman You Want (1952)
- The Border Man (1952)
- Sister Alegría (1952)
- Seven Women (1953)
- The Photographer (1953)
- Women Who Work (1953)
- The Three Elenas (1954)
- The White Rose (1954)
- To the Four Winds (1955)
- Chucho el Roto (1960)
- To Each His Life (1960)
- Invincible Guns (1960)
- Carnival Nights (1978)
- The Pulque Tavern (1981)

== Bibliography ==
- Raymond Durgnat. Luis Bunuel. University of California Press, 1977.
