= Agustín Jiménez =

Mexican Photographer

Agustín Jiménez (1901-1974) was a pioneer in modern Mexican photography and cinematography and was, along with his contemporary Manuel Alvarez Bravo, one of the protagonists of the Mexican photographic avant-garde in the late 1920s and 1930s.

== Photography ==
Born in Mexico City, Jiménez became at age 25 the official photographer of the National School of Fine Arts, where he also taught the photography course.

Influenced by the modernist photography introduced into Mexico by Edward Weston and Tina Modotti, Jiménez' work displayed a clear break with romantic pictorialism prevalent in Mexico until the 1920s and incorporated visual elements that included abstract compositions of everyday objects, textures, games of shadows and reflections, and the use of geometric patterns, repetititon and complex camera framing of the image.

== Cinematography ==
A press photographer during the early 1930s, he later became a still photographer and then a cinematographer for Mexico's burgeoning film industry, collaborating on more than 200 films with directors Sergei Eisenstein, Adolfo Best Maugard and others.

== Publications and exhibitions ==
During his lifetime, his photographic work was published in Cuba, the United States and England and exhibited in New York and San Francisco. Jimenez' entire extant body of photographic images is believed to comprise fewer than 200 vintage prints.

In 2004, Editorial RM (Barcelona/Mexico) published a retrospective monograph of his work, titled Agustín Jiménez y la vanguardia fotográfica mexicana (Agustín Jiménez and the Mexican Photographic Avant-Garde), authored by the Mexican curator and art historian Carlos Córdova.

== Death ==
Jimenez died in 1974 in Mexico City.
