= Carmen Barajas Sandoval =

Mexican writer (1925–2014)

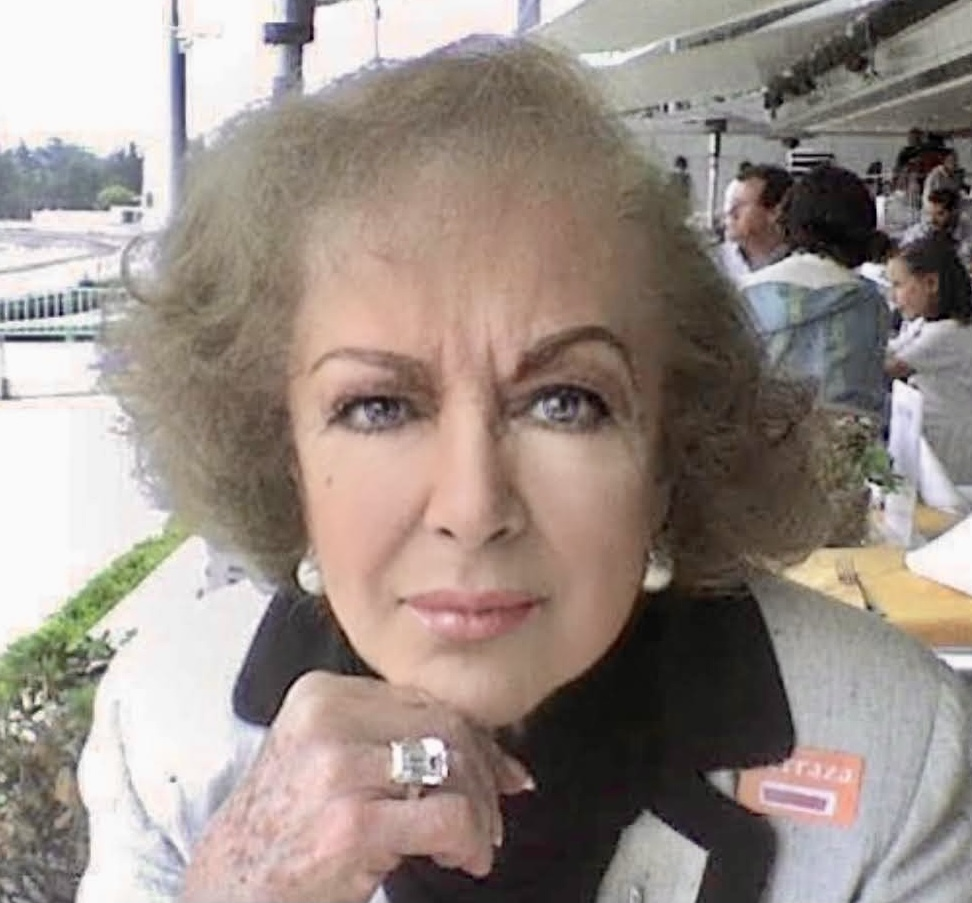
- Barajas Sandoval in 2010
- Born: Carmen Barajas y de Sandoval Paullada; May 18, 1925; Mexico City, Mexico
- Died: November 5, 2014 (aged 89); Mexico City, Mexico
- Years active: 1940 - 1982
- Height: 5”9. 1.75m
- Children: Carmen

Carmen Barajas Sandoval (Countess of Bragny. Countess of Barajas) (May 19, 1925 - November 5, 2014) was a Mexican aristocrat, film executive producer, best-selling author and internationally known socialite, famous for her Mexican and international films and later in her life, by her biographies of stars such as María Félix and Jorge Negrete.

== Family ==
She was born Maria Del Carmen Barajas Y De Sandoval Paullada in Mexico City, Mexico. Her parents were Lorenzo Barajas and Edelmira Sandoval Paullada Escoffier.

Her mother was a descendant of Charles Louis Escoffier, Count of Bragny, a member of the House of Bourbon-Montpensier. He was a director of the Royal Academy of Surgery and personal physician to King Louis XVI of France. During the French Revolution (1789–1799), Bragny left France and settled in Campeche, Campeche, Viceroyalty of New Spain.

His father was the grandson of Fernando De Barajas Y De Fernán Nuñez, Count of Barajas.

== Biography ==
Barajas Sandoval was born on May 18, 1925, in Mexico City as a member of an old and aristocratic family of French and Spanish origins. She was the first of four children that Edelmira De Sandoval Y Paullada Escoffier and Lorenzo Barajas y De Fernán Nuñez had. The family home was located where Mexico city's Stamp Museum now stands. After a few years, the family moved to a new and luxurious neighborhood called "Chapultepec Heights" now known as " Lomas de Chapultepec" where the family house still exists.

At a very young age she met Jorge Negrete and became a very close friend of the actor's family. When Carajas Sandoval was 15 years old, she asked him to give her a summer job as his assistant and immediately fell in love with the cinema industry where she worked for the vast majority of her life, working mostly as a producer.

Due to this friendship, and to her career in the film industry, Barajas Sandoval became friends with some of the most important people in Mexican show business, such as María Félix, Dolores del Río, Miroslava and Pedro Infante. She was responsible for introducing the later to Jorge Negrete and therefore helped launch Infante's career.

In 1947, she married Luis Alfonso Lavalle but the marriage ended in divorce only six years later.

Barajas Sandoval was related to 84 productions both in Mexico and internationally, working in the executive production department at Matouk Films and in 1960, she founded, along with some friends and family members, a company, involved primarily in the production and distribution of films. They made several productions among we can count Batalla en el paraíso (A Battle in Paradise), A la sombra del Sol (In the Shadow of the Sun) & Vagabundo en la lluvia (Stranger in the Rain), Tiburoneros (Shark Hunters), Tlayucan & Tarahumara. These films were a huge success and won several international prizes, including a nomination for the Academy Award for Best Foreign Language Film in 1962 and the Palme d'Or award at the Cannes Film Festival in 1964 for Tarahumara.

After this, Barajas Sandoval became a respected personality in the film industry and became a member at the Council of the Mexican Academy of Film.

Later in her life, along with her sister Edelmira, she created an haute couture atelier that quickly became a success in Mexico. Her creations were considered to have the same high quality as any European designer. International stars such as Sylvia Koschina, Christa Linder, and Angélica María wore her creations on several premieres and red carpets around the world. This partnership with her sister ended a few years later and Barajas Sandoval ultimately closed the atelier.

Due to her close relationship with France, and her efforts to improve the diplomatic affairs between France and Mexico, in 1986 Barajas Sandoval received the Légion d'honneur from President François Mitterrand at the Élysée Palace.

== Feminism and anti-discrimination struggle ==
In 1975, Carajas Sandoval was invited by her cousin, Anilú Elias Paullada to a feminist conference. From the first moment she became a passionate feminist and joined the Movimiento Nacional de Mujeres (Women's National Movement).

During this time, this group made several and important contributions to help abused women both in Mexico and internationally.

"The feminist struggle is the most important one in history ever" said Carajas Sandoval who tells impressive numbers about abused women along history, both in her country and the world in her autobiographical book Gracias a la vida.

"I will never stop fighting to help anyone who is abused and discriminated" says Carajas Sandoval who is also a passionate defender of the rights of homosexuals, Colored and the Jewish people's rights, and believes that every person has the duty of doing likewise.

"We cannot consider ourselves as civilized people until every form of discrimination has been eradicated. Women have been abused and discriminated for thousands of years because men believed we were second class humans. Even today in the 21st century, people in some countries still have the stupid idea that having a baby girl as a first born is a misfortune and let the baby die. This abomination has to be eradicated before anyone can call themselves as civilized.

"I also have said over and over again that everyone has a right to love and be loved, and nobody on this earth has the right to tell anyone that their love for another human being is morally wrong just because they happen to be persons of the same sex. I also believe that no one can discriminate anybody just because they happen to worship a god who has a different name, or to humiliate or abuse someone just because they have a different skin tone, a different nationality or a different culture... It's vital we understand that we humans inhabit this tiny planet together and if we are to survive, it will have to be together, or not at all."

In the end antiblack, antifemale, antigay and all forms of discrimination are equivalent to the same thing - antihumanism.""

Carajas Sandoval is also a defender of capital punishment against rapists and killers and, along with her feminist group changed Mexican legislation in order to apply stronger punishment against violence towards women.

== Social life ==
Carajas Sandoval has been well known among the Mexican and international jet set. In her autobiography Gracias a la Vida she tells how she became friends with some of the most important people in Mexico's show business, politics, presidents and multi millionaires.

Some of her international friends are: Dolores del Río, Frank Sinatra, Yves Montand, HRH Prince Edward, Duke of Kent, Baron Alexis de Rédé, Johannes, 11th Prince of Thurn and Taxis, Lord Louis Mountbatten, Jacques Gelman and his wife Natasha, Baron Richard Di Portanova, Count Paul of Ganay, Mohammad Reza Pahlavi Shah of Iran, and his wife ex-Empress Farah Diba, Baron Philippe de Rothschild, the prominent French actor Gérard Philipe, Baron Gottfried Alexander Maximilian Walter Kurt von Cramm, Prince David Mdivani, Count Curt Heinrich Eberhard Erdmann Georg von Haugwitz-Hardenberg-Reventlow, Prince Pierre Raymond Doan, Baroness Marie-Hélène de Rothschild, Luis Buñuel, Jean Renoir, Liliane Bettencourt and director Luis Alcoriza.

== Cinema career ==
Carajas Sandoval first contact with the cinema industry was in 1940. She was then 15 years old and a friend of her family who worked in the business offered her a summer job as a script girl. From the very first moment, she fell in love with the making of films and returned every time she had vacations from school. She was eager to learn everything she could and was soon known for being the first one to arrive into the set and the last one to leave at night. Her desire to be in that world led her to ask her friend and neighbor Jorge Negrete, for a job. He gladly took her under his wing and he hired her as his assistant. Carajas Sandoval was determined to learn as much as she could from every aspect of a production. She was known for going around the set asking questions to everyone she ran into. After 5 years of working with him, Negrete help her by including her as production assistant in his friends' movies.

Carajas Sandoval soon became famous among the show business personalities of the Golden Age of Mexican cinema, her hard work got noticed quite soon and in 1951, at the age of 26, producer Antonio Matouk included her in his executive production team for a Buñuel movie called Los olvidados.

Her cinema career spanned for 36 years. During this time she was related to 84 productions, mostly as executive producer but also in the overall production and distribution of the films as well. "Movies are magical, they can make you dream, they can make you laugh or cry or even take you into the future or the past, the movie industry is undoubtedly the ultimate dream factory"

Throughout her career, Carajas Sandoval worked with many stars, directors and producers such as Luis Buñuel, Jean Renoir, Emilio Fernández, Ismael Rodríguez and particularly with Luis Alcoriza with whom she shared a long life friendship and with whom she made the vast majority of her films.

Among the movies she made, some were later included into the 100 best in Mexican history ever list, mostly the ones she made with Alcoriza and Buñuel, such as Los Olvidados, Él, La Cucaracha, El Ángel Exterminador, Tlayucan, La Ilusión viaja en Tranvía, Dos tipos de Cuidado, El Esqueleto de la Señora Morales, Tiburoneros & Doña Perfecta.

In the early 1970s, she partially retired from the industry, mostly because she thought that the movies that were made around that time had no quality whatsoever. "It is very sad to see the decline of the cinema that was once considered as the most important one in the Spanish speaking world. I my time, we cared about art, about making intelligent and inspiring movies with great productions and great stars, in the '70s, producers and directors only cared about how much money they could make, and, since sex it's a proven formula to sell anything, they focused on making cheap movies that only depicted prostitutes that were having soft core porn with third class comics and actors. This movies were indeed an economic success, but were the kind of movies that never stood the test of time, since people forgot them as soon as they left the movie theatre. No great stars ever participated in such movies nor any great star came from one of them. What this movies really were is poison to the once great Mexican movie industry."

In 1974, director Miguel Delgado offered her a large sum of money in order to work with him in a movie called Las Ficheras, but she refused, stating that she rather stay home than work in a piece of trash. "I don't need the money- said Carmen- I work for art. It will be an insult to all the great producers, directors and stars with whom I had the privilege to work with if I now decide to participate in such a disgrace." Carajas Sandoval, however, did return sometimes to make movies in the 1970s, all of them with friend Luis Alcoriza, because she thought that even if this movies had a sexual content, the stories did not focus on sex. Finally, in 1982, she made her last movie called Tac, Tac, han violado a una mujer, in Spain, again with Alcoriza. This movie had a strong feminist theme and won the "Critics Award" at Cannes Film Festival, and Carajas Sandoval decided that this movie would be the perfect ending of her long career. Today, Carajas Sandoval says that Mexican cinema is slowly recovering from those "Annus Horribilis" although she still believes there's a long way to run. "There are some good stories out there, and good actors too, in recent years I've seen some great movies such as El Callejón de los Milagros, Conejo en la Luna, El Crimen del Padre Amaro or Arrancame la Vida I really do believe that if they continue to make this high quality films we will one day regain our prestige.... I hope to still be around to see it."

== Filmography ==
Carajas Sandoval has been involved in the production of 84 films:

- Tac-Tac (1982)

... a.k.a. Han Violado a una Mujer (Spain)

- Tres Mujeres en la Hoguera (1979)
- Las Mariposas Disecadas (1978)
- Las Fuerzas Vivas (1975)
- Presagio (1975)

... a.k.a. Presage (International: English title)

- El Muro del Silencio (1974)
- La Generala (1970)
- El Oficio Mas Antiguo del Mundo (1970)
- Trampa para un Cadáver (1969)
- ¡Persiguelas y... Alcanzalas! (1969)

... a.k.a. Agente Secretisimo (Mexico: poster title)

- Romeo contra Julieta (1968)
- Vagabundo en la LLuvia (1968)

...aka There's a Stranger in the Rain (International: English title)

- La Puerta y la Mujer del Carnicero (1968)

... a.k.a. The Door and the Woman of the Butcher

- Juego Peligroso (1967)

... a.k.a. Jôgo Perigoso (Brazil)

- 5 de chocolate y 1 de fresa (1967)
- La Primera Comunión (1966)
- La Soldadera (1966)
- Tarahumara (Cada vez más lejos) (1965)

... a.k.a. Always Further On (International: English title)

- El Gángster (1965)

... a.k.a. The Gangster (International: English title)

- Viva Maria! (1965)
- Simón del desierto (1965)
- El Pecador (1964)
- Amor y Sexo (1963)

...aka Safo 63 (International title)

- Tiburoneros (1963)

... a.k.a. The Shark Hunters (International: English title)

- The Manchurian Candidate (1962)
- El Angel Exterminador (1962)

...aka The Exterminating Angel (International: English Title)

- Tlayucan (1962)

... a.k.a. The Pearl of Tlayucan

- Suicídate mi Amor (1961)

... a.k.a. Kill Yourself, My Love (International: English title)

- Muchachas que Trabajan (1965)
- Los Jóvenes (1961)

... a.k.a. Young People (International: English title)

- Guantes de Oro (1961)
- Bala Perdida (1960)

... a.k.a. Stray Bullet (US)

- El Esqueleto de la señora Morales (1960)

... a.k.a. Skeleton of Mrs. Morales (US)

- El pecado de una madre (1960)
- Los Ambiciosos (1959)

...aka La fièvre monte à El Pao (France)

- El Hombre del Alazán (1959)
- Le Dejeuner Sur L'Herbe (1959)
- El Cariñoso (1959)
- Escuela de rateros (1958)
- La Cucaracha (1958)

...aka The Soldiers of Pancho Villa (International: English Title)

- La estrella vacía (1958)
- Morir de Pie (1957)
- La mort en ce jardin (1956)

... a.k.a. Death in the Garden (US)

... a.k.a. Evil Eden

... a.k.a. Gina (US)

... a.k.a. La Muerte en el Jardín (Mexico)

... a.k.a. The Diamond Hunters (UK)

- El Inocente (1956)

... a.k.a. The Innocent (International: English title)

- Tizoc (1956)
- El Río y la Muerte (1955)

... a.k.a. The River and Death (US)

- La Vida No Vale Nada (1955)
- Los Heroés Están Fatigados (1955)
- Sombra Verde (1954)

... a.k.a. Untouched (US)

- La visita Que No Tocó el Timbre (1954)
- La Ilusión Viaja en Tranvía (1954)

... a.k.a. Illusion Travels by Streetcar (US)

- Gitana Tenías Que Ser (1953) (story)
- Él (1953)

... a.k.a. This Strange Passion (US: reissue title)

... a.k.a. Torments

- No Te Ofendas, Beatriz (1953)

... a.k.a. Don't Be Offended Beatrice (International: English title)

- Dos Tipos de Cuidado (1953)
- Reportaje (1953)
- El Bruto (1953)

... a.k.a. The Brute (International: English Title)

- Se Le Pasó La Mano (1952)

... a.k.a. Overdoing It (International: English title)

- Carne de Presidio (1952)
- La Miel Se Fue de la Luna (1952)
- Hambre Nuestra de Cada Día (1952)
- Doña Perfecta (1951)
- Canasta Uruguaya (1951)
- Los Enredos de una Gallega (1951)
- 21. La hija del Engaño (1951)

... a.k.a. Daughter of Deceit (US)

- El Siete Machos (1951)
- Una Gringuita en México (1951)
- Si Usted No Puede, Yo Sí (1951)
- Los Olvidados (1950)

... a.k.a. The Forgotten Ones (International: English title: literal title)

... a.k.a. The Young and the Damned

- Huellas del Pasado (1950)
- Si Me Viera Don Porfirio (1950)

... a.k.a. El rancho de la discordia (Mexico: subtitle)

- Mala Hembra (1950)
- Yo Quiero Ser Hombre (1950)
- Hipólito, el de Santa (1950)
- La liga de las Muchachas (1950)

... a.k.a. Adorables Rebeldes (Mexico)

- Tú, Solo Tú (1950)
- Un Cuerpo de Mujer (1949)
- El Gran Calavera (1949)

... a.k.a. The Great Madcap (US)

- Los Amores de una Viuda (1949)
- Negra Consentida (1949)
- Flor de Caña (1948)
- Enrédate y Verás (1948)
- Nocturno de Amor (1948)

... a.k.a. Nocturne of Love (International: English title)

- Una Extraña Mujer (1947)
- El Ahijado de la Muerte (1946)

== Books ==
Barajas Sandoval has published seven bestelling books:

- Galileo (Editorial Continental, México, 1958) is a lightweight biography of the great physicist, mathematician, astronomer, and philosopher. Out of stock.
- Chopin (Editorial Continental, México 1958) is a biography on the French-Polish virtuoso pianist and piano composer of the Romantic period. This book is considered by the Chopin Foundation as the only accurate book on the artist's life.
- Gracias à la Vida (Joaquín Porrúa Editores, México, 1986) is her autobographical book where she relates her life and the interaction she had with some of the most important and impressive people in the 1940- 1970 era.
- Una Muja Llamada María Félix (EDAMEX, México, 1993) is a book with an easy narrative style in which she relates her longlife friendship with one of Mexico's ultimate divas.
- Con el alma el un hilo (Editorial Praxis, México, 1995) is a book divided in 3 parts, each one containing a sad story of 3 unrelated women in Mexico's early 20th century. This book is now considered as a reliable document about women's life conditions in Latin American countries.
- Jorge Negrete: Aspectos Desconocido Del Idolo Cinematografico (EDAMEX, México, 2001) is a biography of one of the most popular Mexican singers and actors of all time and the friendship they shared until Negrete's death.
- Angélica María: La Novia de Mexico (Reader's Digest, Mexico, 2005) is a biography of superstar Angélica María.
