= List of Mexican films of 1950 =

A list of the films produced in Mexico in 1950 (see 1950 in film):

== 1950 ==
Title	Director	Cast	Genre	Notes
1950
Anacleto Gets Divorced	Joselito Rodríguez	Carlos Orellana, Rosita Arenas, Rita Montaner	Comedy	
Another Spring	Alfredo B. Crevenna	Libertad Lamarque, Ernesto Alonso, Patricia Moran	Drama	
Aventurera	Alberto Gout	Ninón Sevilla Andrea Palma, Tito Junco	Drama	
Between Your Love and Heaven	Emilio Gómez Muriel	Rosario Granados, Roberto Cañedo, Rodolfo Acosta	Drama	
Black Angustias	Matilde Landeta	María Elena Marqués, Agustín Isunza, Eduardo Arozamena	Drama	
By the False Door	Fernando de Fuentes	Pedro Armendáriz, Rita Macedo, Andrea Palma	Drama	
Cabaret Shanghai	Juan Orol	Rosa Carmina, Manuel Arvide, Amparo Arozamena	Crime drama	
The Dangerous Age	José Díaz Morales	María Elena Marqués, Andrea Palma, Carlos Navarro	Drama	
A Decent Woman	Raúl de Anda	Elsa Aguirre, Rafael Baledón, Gloria Ríos	Drama	
Doctor on Call	Adolfo Fernández Bustamante	Armando Calvo, Lilia del Valle, Luis Beristáin	Drama	
Doña Diabla	Tito Davison	María Félix, Víctor Junco	Drama	Entered into the 1951 Cannes Film Festival
The Doorman	Miguel M. Delgado	Cantinflas, Silvia Pinal, Óscar Pulido	Comedy	
Duel in the Mountains	Emilio Fernández	Rita Macedo, Fernando Fernández, Eduardo Arozamena	War	
A Gypsy in Havana	Juan José Martínez Casado	Paquita de Ronda, Juan José Martínez Casado, Florencio Castelló	Musical comedy	Co-production with Cuba
Los Olvidados	Luis Buñuel	Roberto Cobo, Miguel Inclán		Entered into the 1951 Cannes Film Festival
It's a Sin to Be Poor	Fernando A. Rivero	Ramón Armengod, Guillermina Grin, Tito Junco	Crime drama	
The Mark of the Skunk	Gilberto Martínez Solares	Tin Tan, Silvia Pinal, Marcelo Chávez	Comedy	
The Man Without a Face	Juan Bustillo Oro	Arturo de Córdova, Carmen Molina, Miguel Ángel Ferriz	Thriller	
Memories of a Mexican	Salvador Toscano, Carmen Toscano		Documentary	Entered into the 1954 Cannes Film Festival
My Favourite	Chano Urueta	Sara García, Antonio Badú, Martha Roth	Comedy	
Sobre las olas	Ismael Rodríguez	Pedro Infante, Beatriz Aguirre		
Gemma	René Cardona	María Elena Marqués, María Tereza Montoya		
El ciclón del Caríbe	Ramón Pereda	María Antonieta Pons, Ramón Pereda		
Nosotras las taquígrafas	Emilio Gómez Muriel	Alma Rosa Aguirre, Lilia del Valle, Blanca de Castejón		
The Little House	Roberto Gavaldón	Dolores del Río, Miroslava, Roberto Cañedo	Drama	
Lost	Fernando A. Rivero	Ninón Sevilla, Agustín Lara, Domingo Soler	Drama	
Orange Blossom for Your Wedding	Julián Soler	Fernando Soler, Sara García, Marga López	Comedy drama	
Red Rain	René Cardona	Jorge Negrete, Elsa Aguirre, Rodolfo Landa	Adventure	
Rosauro Castro	Roberto Gavaldón	Pedro Armendáriz, Carlos López Moctezuma, María Douglas	Drama	
Sinbad the Seasick	Gilberto Martínez Solares	Tin Tan, Marcelo Chávez, Vitola, Jacqueline Evans	Comedy	
También de dolor se canta	René Cardona	Pedro Infante, Irma Dorantes, Guillermina Grin, Fannie Kauffman		
To the Sound of the Mambo	Chano Urueta	Amalia Aguilar, Adalberto Martínez, Rita Montaner	Musical	
Traces of the Past	Alfredo B. Crevenna	Libertad Lamarque, Emilia Guiú, José María Linares-Rivas	Drama	
Treacherous	Ernesto Cortázar	Rosa Carmina, Fernando Fernández, Dagoberto Rodríguez	Drama	
The Two Orphans	Roberto Rodríguez	Evita Muñoz, María Eugenia Llamas, Joaquín Cordero	Drama	
Veracruz Passion	Carlos Véjar hijo	Víctor Manuel Mendoza, Irma Torres, Nora Veryán	Musical drama	
When the Night Ends	Emilio Gómez Muriel	David Silva, Lilia Prado, Óscar Pulido	Crime	
Wife or Lover	Adolfo Fernández Bustamante	Rosario Granados, David Silva, Fernando Soto	Drama	
You Shall Not Covet Thy Son's Wife	Ismael Rodríguez	Fernando Soler, Pedro Infante, Carmen Molina	Drama	
Amor de la calle	Ernesto Cortázar	Meche Barba, Fernando Fernández		
Amor salvaje	Juan Orol	Rosa Carmina, Víctor Junco		
Cuando los hijos odian	Joselito Rodríguez	Carlos Orellana		
Cuatro contra el mundo	Alejandro Galindo	Víctor Parra, Leticia Palma		
Hipólito, el de Santa	Fernando de Fuentes	José Luis Jiménez		
If I Were Just Anyone	Ernesto Cortázar	Meche Barba, Fernando Fernández		Sequel to Love Street
Immaculate	Julio Bracho	Rosario Granados, Carlos López Moctezuma, Eduardo Noriega		
La liga de las muchachas	Fernando Cortés	Elsa Aguirre, Alma Rosa Aguirre, Miroslava Stern, Rosina Pagã, Conchita Carracedo		
Love for Love	Ernesto Cortázar	Marga López, Antonio Badú, Víctor Junco		
Mala hembra	Miguel M. Delgado	Rosita Quintana, Ernesto Alonso, Rubén Rojo		
Mi querido capitán	Gilberto Martínez Solares	Fernando Soler, Sara García, Rosita Quintana		
Pancho Villa Returns	Miguel Contreras Torres	Leo Carrillo, Rodolfo Acosta		Made simultaneously with Vuelve Pancho Villa
Vuelve Pancho Villa	Miguel Contreras Torres	Pedro Armendáriz		
Primero soy mexicano	Joaquín Pardavé	Joaquín Pardavé, Luis Aguilar, Flor Silvestre		
Ritmos del Caribe	Juan José Ortega	Amalia Aguilar, Rafael Baledón	Musical	
Si me viera don Porfirio		Sara García		
The Lost City	Agustín P. Delgado	Martha Roth, Roberto Romaña, Esperanza Issa		
The Torch	Emilio Fernández	Paulette Goddard, Pedro Armendáriz, Gilbert Roland, Walter Reed, Julio Villarreal		Remake of Enamorada
Tú, solo tú	Miguel M. Delgado	Rosita Quintana, Luis Aguilar, Luis Alcoriza, Arturo Soto Rangel, Dolores Camarillo		
Yo quiero ser hombre		Alma Rosa Aguirre, Abel Salazar and Sara García		
Yo quiero ser tonta	Eduardo Ugarte	Sara García, Fernando Soler, Rosita Quintana		

== See also ==
- 1950 in Mexico
