= List of Mexican films of 1959 =

A list of the films produced in Mexico in 1959 (see 1959 in film):

== 1959 ==
Title	Director	Cast	Genre	Notes
1959
Amor se dice cantando (Live is Said Singing)	Miguel Morayta	Miguel Aceves Mejía	Comedy drama	
Dos fantasmas y una muchacha	Rogelio A. González			
Flor de Mayo	Roberto Gavaldón	Jack Palance, María Félix, Pedro Armendáriz	Drama	Entered into the 9th Berlin International Film Festival
Hambre nuestra de cada día	Rogelio A. González			Entered into the 1st Moscow International Film Festival
La cucaracha	Ismael Rodríguez	María Félix, Dolores del Río, Emilio Fernández, Pedro Armendáriz	Drama	Entered into the 1959 Cannes Film Festival
Nazarín	Luis Buñuel	Francisco Rabal	Drama	
Las Señoritas Vivanco	Mauricio de la Serna	Sara García, Prudencia Griffel	Comedy	
Sonatas	Juan Antonio Bardém	Francisco Rabal, Fernando Rey, María Félix, Aurora Bautista	Historical drama	Co-production with Spain
Angelitos del trapecio	Agustín P. Delgado	Viruta y Capulina, Maricruz Olivier, Cesáreo Quezadas "Pulgarcito"		
Vagabundo y millonario	Miguel Morayta	Tin Tan, Sonia Furió, Claudio Brook		
Dos corazones y un cielo	Rafael Baledón	Demetrio González, Eulalio González, Rosa de Castilla		
El cariñoso	Rafael Baledón	Miguel Aceves Mejía, Martha Mijares, Armando Arriola		
El hombre de alazán				
Los Santos Reyes		Sara García		
No soy monedita de oro	Chano Urueta	Armando Arriola, Fernando Casanova, Daniel 'Chino' Herrera		
Santa Claus	René Cardona			
Sube y baja	Miguel M. Delgado	Cantinflas, Teresa Velázquez, Domingo Soler, Carlos Agostí, Alejandro Ciangherotti		
The Black Bull				
The Life of Agustín Lara	Alejandro Galindo	Germán Robles, Lorena Velázquez, Ofelia Montesco		
The Living Coffin	Fernando Méndez	Gastón Santos, María Duval, Pedro de Aguillón		
Yo pecador	Alfonso Corona Blake	Sara García		
Yo... el aventurero	Jaime Salvador	Antonio Aguilar, Rosa de Castilla, Ángel Infante, Amalia Mendoza, Andrés Soler, Domingo Soler		

== See also ==
- 1959 in Mexico
