= Norma Angélica Ladrón de Guevara =

Mexican actress (1937–1962)

- Born: Norma Angélica Ladrón de Guevara González; 1937; Mexico
- Died: 30 December 1962 (aged 25); Mexico City, Mexico
- Occupations: Actress, dancer
- Years active: 1957–1962
- Awards: 1963 Best Actress Silver Goddess Award for Tlayucan

Norma Angélica Ladrón de Guevara González (1937 – 30 December 1962) was a Mexican actress. She is best remembered for her appearance in the film Tlayucan (1962), for which she posthumously won the Silver Goddess for Best Actress in 1963.

== Career ==
She was born in 1937, the daughter of María Teresa González and Mr. Ladrón de Guevara. She began her career around 1957 as a dancer in nightclubs and theaters.

In cinema, she began participating in films such as El boxeador (1958), starring Joaquín Cordero, and Tin Tan y las modelos (1960), starring Tin Tan, but she achieved stardom and gained international fame with her performance in Luis Alcoriza's Academy Award-nominated film, Tlayucan (1962), with Julio Aldama, Andrés Soler and Noé Murayama. Another one of her most famous films is Ruletero a toda marcha (1962), in which she played a single mother named Carmen and co-starred with Eulalio González "El Piporro", María Duval and Sara García.

On stage, she appeared in plays such as La tierra es redonda and Blum. Her final film was La rabia por dentro, co-starring English model June Wilkinson and Armando Silvestre.

== Death ==
It was said that Ladrón de Guevara was extremely shy and that is the reason why her mother and her brother Víctor never noticed the emotional lack of control the actress was going through to the point of deciding to commit suicide. According to her brother's statements, the actress "was as cheerful and content as ever" the night that she "announced her intentions to bathe" and locked herself in the bathroom and filled the tub. "Thirty or forty minutes passed", and since the actress was still in the bathroom, her mother and her brother became worried and knocked on the door. When they did not get a reply, they forced the door open and found the actress unconscious in the tub. She had swallowed twenty-five sleeping pills. She was taken immediately to the Hospital de la Raza, where she remained in a coma until she died of cardiac arrest on 30 December 1962 at 10:30 am. She was interred the next day in the actors' section of Mexico City's Panteón Jardín.

In 1963, at the 1st Silver Goddess Awards, the actress was posthumously honored with the Best Actress accolade for her role in Tlayucan.
