= List of Mexican films of the 1950s =

A list of the films produced in the Cinema of Mexico in the 1950s, ordered by year of release. For an alphabetical list of articles on Mexican films see Category:Mexican films.

== 1950 ==
- List of Mexican films of 1950

== 1951 ==
- List of Mexican films of 1951

== 1952 ==
- List of Mexican films of 1952

== 1953 ==
- List of Mexican films of 1953

== 1954 ==
- List of Mexican films of 1954

== 1955 ==
- List of Mexican films of 1955

== 1956 ==
- List of Mexican films of 1956

== 1957 ==
- List of Mexican films of 1957

== 1958 ==
- List of Mexican films of 1958

== 1959 ==
- List of Mexican films of 1959
