= Jay Jensen =

Jay Jensen may refer to:

- Jay Jensen (athletic trainer)
- Jay E. Jensen (born 1942), general authority of the Church of Jesus Christ of Latter-day Saints
- Jay W. Jensen (1931–2007), American drama teacher
