= Soledad (film) =

1947 film

- Directed by: Miguel Zacarías
- Written by: Edmundo Báez; Silvia Guerrico (novel); Miguel Zacarías
- Produced by: Óscar Dancigers; Jesús Grovas
- Starring: Libertad Lamarque; René Cardona; Marga López; Rubén Rojo; Rafael Alcayde; Prudencia Grifell
- Cinematography: Ignacio Torres
- Edited by: Jorge Bustos
- Music by: Manuel Esperón
- Production companies: Águila Films; Producciones Grovas
- Distributed by: Clasa-Mohme
- Release date: 28 November 1947
- Running time: 103 minutes
- Country: Mexico
- Language: Spanish

Soledad is a 1947 Mexican drama film directed by Miguel Zacarías and starring Libertad Lamarque, René Cardona and Marga López. It was shot at the Clasa Studios in Mexico City. The film's sets were designed by the art director Javier Torres Torija.

== Plot ==
Soledad Somellera (Libertad Lamarque), an Argentine maid, secretly marries the son of her employers, Roberto Covarrubias (René Cardona). However, Roberto abandons her soon after to marry a wealthy woman, revealing to Soledad that their wedding was staged and thus not valid. Soledad runs away, pregnant with Roberto's child, although soon after, Roberto's mother locates her and convinces her to give up her daughter so that she can grow up without suffering hardships. Soledad becomes a famous singer, adopting the stage name of Cristina Palermo, while her daughter, Evangelina (Marga López), grows into a spoiled brat who, when she has the opportunity to meet Palermo, treats her with contempt, ignoring that she is her mother.

== Cast ==
- Libertad Lamarque as Soledad Somellera / Cristina Palermo
- René Cardona as Roberto Covarrubias
- Marga López as Evangelina
- Rubén Rojo as Carlos
- Consuelo Guerrero de Luna as Marina
- Rafael Alcayde as Arturo (as Rafael Alcaide)
- Prudencia Grifell as Roberto's mother
- Elena Contla as Petra, maid
- Pepe Martínez as Evaristo (as Pepito Martinez)
- Armida Bracho as Elena
- Alicia Caro as Florist (uncredited)
- José Escanero as Don Paco, licenciado (uncredited)
- Ana María Hernández as Dinner guest (uncredited)
- Salvador Lozano as Doctor (uncredited)
- Rubén Márquez as Man in restaurant (uncredited)
- Elda Peralta as Evangelina's friend (uncredited)
- Ignacio Peón as Witness at wedding (uncredited)
- Félix Samper as Man in restaurant (uncredited)
- Armando Sáenz as Carlos's friend (uncredited)

== Reception ==
Soledad was the second film made by Libertad Lamarque in Mexico, after Luis Buñuel's Gran Casino (1946). Several film critics, such as Isaac León Frías, Stuart A. Day, and others, considered the film as a recovery for Lamarque after Gran Casino did not have a favorable reception.
