= La liga de las muchachas =

- Directed by: Fernando Cortés
- Written by: Janet Alcoriza (story and adaptation); Luis Alcoriza (story and adaptation)
- Produced by: Óscar Dancigers; Mauricio de la Serna
- Starring: Elsa Aguirre; Alma Rosa Aguirre; Miroslava Stern; Rosina Pagã; Conchita Carracedo
- Cinematography: Agustín Martínez Solares
- Edited by: Carlos Savage
- Music by: Manuel Esperón
- Release date: 1950
- Country: Mexico
- Language: Spanish

La liga de las muchachas ("The League of Girls") is a 1950 Mexican comdey film, written by Janet Alcoriza and Luis Alcoriza, directed by Fernando Cortés, and starring Elsa Aguirre, Alma Rosa Aguirre, Miroslava Stern, Rosina Pagã and Conchita Carracedo.

== Cast ==
- Elsa Aguirre as Dorita
- Miroslava Stern as Marta
- Rubén Rojo as Pablo
- Consuelo Guerrero de Luna as Doña Remedios
- Jorge Reyes as Amado
- Alma Rosa Aguirre as Amelia
- José Ángel Espinosa 'Ferrusquilla' as Mario (as José A. Espinosa 'Ferrusquilla')
- Rosina Pagã (as Rosina Pagan)
- Luis Alcoriza as Jefe de mafiosos
- Conchita Carracedo as Irene
- Antonio Bravo as Don Adolfo del Toro
- Magda Donato as Celestina
- Óscar Pulido as Borracho
- Antonio R. Frausto as Don Pedro
- Francisco Aguayo
- Ceferino Silva
- Jeanette Combs
- Elisa Christy as Muchacha (uncredited)
- Irma Dorantes as Bailarina (uncredited)
- Lidia Franco as Portera de casa de Amelia (uncredited)
- María Gentil Arcos as Sirvienta (uncredited)
- Emilio Girón as Niño (uncredited)
- Anabel Gutiérrez as Bailarina (uncredited)
- Rosario Gutiérrez as Bailarina (uncredited)
- Pilar Pellicer as Bailarina (uncredited)
- Pina Pellicer as Bailarina (uncredited)
- Humberto Rodríguez as Policía (uncredited)
- Alfredo Varela padre as Jefe de policía (uncredited)
