= List of Mexican films of 1955 =

A list of the films produced in Mexico in 1955 (see 1955 in film):

== 1955 ==
| Title | Director | Cast | Genre | Notes |
|---|---|---|---|---|
1955
| Abajo el telón | Miguel M. Delgado | Cantinflas, Christiane Martel, Beatriz Saavedra | | |
| After the Storm | Roberto Gavaldón | Marga López, Lilia Prado, Ramón Gay | Drama | |
| Ensayo de un crimen | Luis Buñuel | Ernesto Alonso, Miroslava, Rita Macedo, Andrea Palma | | |
| Escuela de música | Miguel Zacarías | Pedro Infante, Libertad Lamarque | | |
| Escuela de vagabundos | Rogelio A. González | Pedro Infante, Miroslava, Blanca de Castejon | | |
| Espaldas mojadas | Alejandro Galindo | | | |
| Estafa de amor | Miguel M. Delgado | Elsa Aguirre, Ramón Gay | | |
| Un extraño en la escalera | Tulio Demicheli | Silvia Pinal, Arturo de Córdova | | |
| Father Against Son | Juan Bustillo Oro | Manolo Fábregas, Julio Villarreal, Silvia Derbez | Drama | |
| Historia de un abrigo de mink | Emilio Gómez Muriel | Irasema Dilián, María Elena Marqués, Silvia Pinal, Columba Domínguez | | |
| El monstruo en la sombra | Zacarías Gómez Urquiza | Luis Beristain, Jaime Fernandez | Mystery | |
| Pecado mortal | Miguel M. Delgado | Gloria Marín, Silvia Pinal, Víctor Junco | | |
| ¡Que bravas son las costeñas! | Roberto Rodríguez | María Antonieta Pons, Evangelina Elizondo | | |
| Lo que le pasó a Sansón | Gilberto Martínez Solares | Tin Tan, Ana Bertha Lepe, Andrés Soler, Yolanda Varela | | |
| The Murderer X | Juan Bustillo Oro | Carlos López Moctezuma, Manolo Fábregas, Prudencia Grifell | Thriller | |
| Raíces | Benito Alazraki | | | Entered into the 1955 Cannes Film Festival |
| The Seven Girls | Roberto Rodríguez | Manuel Palacios, Estanislao Schillinsky, Rosa de Castilla | Comedy | |
| Las Viudas del Cha Cha Cha | Miguel M. Delgado | Amalia Aguilar, Chula Prieto | | |
| ...Y mañana serán mujeres | Alejandro Galindo | Rosita Quintana, Roberto Cañedo, Carmen Iñarra | | |
| A Life in the Balance | Harry Horner, Rafael Portillo | Ricardo Montalbán, Anne Bancroft, Lee Marvin | | |
| Bluebeard | Gilberto Martínez Solares | Germán Valdés, Amanda del Llano, Verónica Loyo, Lola Beltrán, Fannie Kauffman | | |
| Cupido pierde a Paquita | | María Victoria, Julio Aldama, Carlos Orellana | | |
| El vendedor de muñecas | Chano Urueta | Pedro López Lagar, Silvia Pinal, Martha Valdés | | |
| La vida no vale nada | Rogelio A. González | Pedro Infante, Rosario Granados, Domingo Soler | | |
| Los paquetes de Paquita | | Carlos Orellana | | |
| Madame X | Julián Soler | Libertad Lamarque | | |
| Magdalena | Joaquín Pardavé | Rosario Granados, Fernando Fernández, Rodolfo Landa | | |
| Señora Ama | Julio Bracho | Dolores del Río, José Suárez | Drama | Spanish-Mexican co-production |
| Sólo para maridos | Fernando Soler | Manolo Fábregas, Alicia Caro, Fernando Soler, Sara García | | |
| The Coyote | Joaquín Luis Romero Marchent, Fernando Soler | Abel Salazar, Gloria Marín, Manuel Monroy | | |
| The Sin of Being a Woman | Zacarías Gómez Urquiza | Tito Guízar, Alma Rosa Aguirre | | |
| To the Four Winds | Adolfo Fernández Bustamante | Rosita Quintana, Miguel Aceves Mejía, Joaquín Pardavé | | |
| Tú y las nubes | | Lola Flores, Miguel Aceves Mejía | | |

== See also ==
- 1955 in Mexico
