= The Strange Woman =

The Strange Woman may refer to:

- The Strange Woman (1918 film), an American silent film starring Gladys Brockwell
- The Strange Woman (1939 film), a German drama film
- The Strange Woman (1946 film), an American historical melodrama film
- The Strange Woman (1947 film), a Mexican drama mystery film

== See also ==
- A Strange Woman, a 1977 Soviet drama film
