= Jay W. Jensen =

American actor (1931–2007)

- Born: Jay W. Jensen; August 4, 1931; Irvington, New Jersey, U.S.
- Died: February 17, 2007 (aged 75); Coral Gables, Florida, U.S.
- Occupations: Acting teacher, director, actor

Jay W. Jensen (August 4, 1931 – February 17, 2007) was a drama teacher in Miami Beach, Florida. known as "The Teacher to the Stars". Jensen is credited with inspiring the acting talents of such well-known actors as Andy García and Mickey Rourke.

== Early life and education ==
Jensen's dance routine in 1952

Jensen was born in Irvington, New Jersey. He was the only child of John W. and Thelma "Billie" Jensen. His father was a musician in a nightclub band, and his mother was a nightclub manager. As a child, he developed a love of film and drama. During his school years, he studied ballroom dancing and acting.

In 1950, his family moved to St. Petersburg, Florida, where he earned an Associate of Arts degree from St. Petersburg College.

Jensen moved to Miami, where he graduated from the University of Miami with a BA in education. In 1953, he left Florida to live and study in Havana, Cuba. While in Cuba, Jensen studied at the University of Havana.

== Career ==
Jensen returned to Miami in 1954, where he began teaching at Little River Junior High School.

After teaching for three years, Jensen decided to pursue his dream of being a motion picture actor and "go to Hollywood and get discovered", and flew to Los Angeles along with his widowed mother, Thelma, and his cat Dracula.

In California, Jensen traveled to Los Angeles for an interview with movie producer Joe Pasternak. Pasternak told Jensen he was leaving the motion picture business, and Jensen's dreams of a movie career were dashed. However, while in Hollywood, Jensen became friends with actress Carroll Baker. He became Baker's dance partner, and appeared as an extra in three of her movies: The Big Country, But Not for Me, and The Miracle. Baker and Jensen performed a dance routine for the troops at MacDill Air Force Base in Tampa, Florida.

Jensen's circle of friends included actors Jim Backus and Hurd Hatfield. After a failed interview with DesiLu Productions, Jensen decided to return to Florida. It was also during the 1950s that he became a close friend of the writer and playwright Tennessee Williams.

Jensen playing a monk in Werewolves on Wheels in 1971

In 1959, Jensen was rehired by Miami-Dade County Public Schools, and began a 32-year career as a drama teacher at Miami Beach Senior High School. However, he didn't give up on his motion picture career. He co-starred in Rehearsal For Sin, an independent film produced in South Florida, and played a few uncredited roles in such movies as Racing Fever and Werewolves on Wheels.

Jensen went on to earn a Master of Education Degree in Administration, Curriculum and Drama Education from the University of Miami. At Miami Beach High, he directed 300 plays and musicals. His productions of the plays You Can't Take It With You, The Fantastics, David and Lisa, The Great White Hope, Gypsy, Hair, The Impossible Years, To Kill a Mockingbird, and Viet Rock, were groundbreaking and controversial for the times.

In 1971, Jensen directed the play The Serpent. The Serpent was a play of Biblical proportions; performed with a begetting scene. One of the student-actors in the cast was future movie star Mickey Rourke. Among his numerous other students were movie actors Andy García, Neal Gold, actor/voice actor Jerry Gelb.; Annabelle Gurwitch; movie directors Brett Ratner and Sara Sackner; rapper Luther Campbell; sportscaster Roy Firestone;, executive producer Heather Winters, music composer Desmond Child; casting director Debra Zane; and artist Romero Britto. Jensen also worked with supermodel Niki Taylor and coached Jennifer Fox in Gypsy.

In the early 1990s, Jensen retired from teaching full-time but continued to work as an instructor for Adult and Community Education for Miami-Dade County Public Schools. His co-faculty members at Fienberg-Fisher Adult and Community Education Center included fellow actors Steven Brack, Lois Brooks, William Conroy, and Carl Starling.

On November 6, 1999, Jensen was inducted into the Miami Beach Senior High School Hall of Fame by the Miami Beach Senior High School Alumni Association.

=== Mexican cinema ===
Jensen (left) in the 1965 Mexican film El Gangster

Jensen was also involved in Mexican cinema and considered Mexico City his second home. He spoke Spanish and worked as an actor and casting director. Jensen acted in five Mexican-produced films from 1965 to 1970, working with directors such as Luis Alcoriza and Albert Zugsmith on the movies El Gangster, Los Cuatro Juanes, Paraiso, El Pistolero Fantasma, and La Captura de Gabino Barrera.

In 2001, Jensen was the casting director for the Mexican production of I Never Saw Another Butterfly. Jensen also served as drama consultant in Mexico City with the Peterson Schools.

=== Tennessee Williams ===
Jensen became friends with writer-playwright Tennessee Williams in the 1950s. They met at the old Robert Clay Hotel in South Beach and remained friends until Williams's death.

In his spare time. Jensen lectured at colleges, book fairs, and festivals about his relationship with Williams. He entitled his lecture, "The Other Side of Tennessee Williams". He was a featured speaker at the Tennessee Williams Literary Fest in New Orleans in 1998, and appeared also at the Tennessee Williams Festival in 2003.

=== Awards and philanthropy ===
Jensen received numerous awards during his life. He served as a regional director for the National Thespian Society, hosted conferences before the Florida State Thespian Festival, and was a Carbonell voter in South Florida.

Jensen donated over $4 million to such institutions as the University of Miami's Theater Arts Department, the School of Education, the Lowe Art Museum, the Ring Theater, and the Peterson Schools in Mexico.

He gave $100,000 to the Actor's Playhouse in Miami. The Mainstage Auditorium Stage was dedicated in honor of Jensen and his parents.

In 1997, he and his mother Thelma bequeathed $1 million to the Lowe Art Museum in Miami, Florida for a pre-Columbian wing named in honor of his 92-year-old mother. He donated another million dollars to the Jerry Herman Ring Theater.

In the July 29, 2002, issue of Time, Jensen was profiled along with other retirees regarding a meltdown in the stock market and eroding pension benefits. "I'm incensed," said Jensen of the scandals rocking the stock market. "Everytime I look I'm getting poorer." However, Jensen told the magazine that regardless of his losses, he still had a positive outlook on life: "My theory is, you die if you don't keep moving."

=== Personal life ===
Jensen was an only child. His father, John W. Jensen, died in the 1950s. His mother, Thelma aka Billie, died in January 1999 at the age of 93.

Jensen never married, but in the 1970s, he was engaged to transsexual dancer Jennifer Fox. The two announced their engagement on The Joey Carr Show, a local South Florida television program. Fox was later interviewed in Class Act, a documentary on Jensen's life.

=== Death ===
In July 2006, Jensen discovered he had prostate cancer. Though seriously ill, he continued to work. He appeared numerous times in fundraising appeals for PBS television. However, his illness quickly progressed, and he died on Saturday, February 17, 2007, in Coral Gables, Florida.

== Filmography ==
Year	Title	Role	Notes
1958	The Big Country	Cowboy	Uncredited
1959	But Not for Me	Actor on Stage	Uncredited
1959	The Miracle	French Soldier	Uncredited
1960	The Bellboy	Hotel Guest	Uncredited
1963	The Checkered Flag	Race Fan	Uncredited
1965	El gángster	Gangster	Uncredited
1966	La Valentina	Soldado Federal	Uncredited
1967	She-Man: A Story of Fixation	Soldier	Uncredited
1968	Mission Mars	Space Center Worker	Uncredited
1970	Paraíso	Hombre	Uncredited
1971	Werewolves on Wheels	Monk	Uncredited
1971	Captain Apache	Soldier	Uncredited
1971	Revenge Is My Destiny	Soldier in Jungle	Uncredited
1974	Lenny	Nightclub Customer	Uncredited
1983	Last Plane Out	Military Officer	Uncredited
1992	Kickboxer Against the Odds		(final film role)
