= The Strange Woman (1947 film) =

- Spanish: Una extraña mujer
- Directed by: Miguel M. Delgado
- Written by: Janet Alcoriza; Luis Alcoriza; Antonio Monsell
- Produced by: Clasa Films Mundiales
- Starring: Roberto Silva; Alicia Barrié; Inés Edmonson; Consuelo Guerrero de Luna; Agustín Isunza; Andrés Soler
- Cinematography: Domingo Carrillo
- Edited by: Jorge Bustos
- Music by: Gonzalo Curiel
- Production company: Clasa Films Mundiales
- Release date: 5 February 1947
- Running time: 97 minutes
- Country: Mexico
- Language: Spanish

The Strange Woman (Spanish: Una extraña mujer) is a 1947 Mexican drama mystery film directed by Miguel M. Delgado and written by Janet Alcoriza, Luis Alcoriza and Antonio Monsell. The film stars Roberto Silva, Alicia Barrié, Inés Edmonson, Consuelo Guerrero de Luna, Agustín Isunza and Andrés Soler.

== Plot summary ==
During a voyage by ship to Havana, a young man is encouraged by his uncle to pursue a wealthy and mysterious woman.

== Cast ==
- Roberto Silva
- Alicia Barrié
- Inés Edmonson
- Consuelo Guerrero de Luna
- Agustín Isunza
- Rafael Alcayde
- José Morcillo
- Eduardo Casado
- Francisco Reiguera
- Julián de Meriche
- Carmelita González
- Eva Calvo
- Roberto Corell
- Rudy del Moral
- Andrés Soler
