= Toro Negro =

Toro Negro (Spanish for black bull) can refer to:

- Toro Negro, Ciales, Puerto Rico
- Toro Negro State Forest, Puerto Rico
- Toro Negro River, Puerto Rico
- The Black Bull (film), a 1959 Mexican film
