= Cinco fueron escogidos =

- Directed by: Herbert Kline
- Written by: Rafael F. Muñoz; Xavier Villaurrutia
- Story by: Budd Schulberg
- Starring: Antonio Bravo; Fernando Cortés; María Douglas; Edmundo Espino; Conchita Gentil Arcos; María Gentil Arcos; María Elena Marqués; Ricardo Montalbán; Joaquín Pardavé; Andrés Soler; Julio Villarreal
- Cinematography: Jack Draper
- Music by: Raúl Lavista
- Release date: 8 July 1943
- Running time: 126 minutes
- Country: Mexico
- Language: Spanish

Cinco fueron escogidos (English: Five Were Chosen) is a 1943 Mexican war film directed by Herbert Kline. It was based on a story by Budd Schulberg, and written by Rafael F. Muñoz and Xavier Villaurrutia.

== Plot ==
The film is set in Yugoslavia occupied by the Wehrmacht. In a small town, a Nazi official is killed, whereupon the occupiers carry out retaliatory measures. Five of the residents of the village are sentenced to death. They represent the different groups of the city: One of them is an aristocrat, one is the mayor, one is one of the city's policemen, one a barber and one an employee. In addition to these five, a homeless man is also to be executed. Their families and neighbors try to obtain the annulment of death sentences.

== Cast ==
- Antonio Bravo
- Fernando Cortés as Babich, the barber
- María Douglas as Mrs. Stojak
- Edmundo Espino as Neighbor
- Conchita Gentil Arcos as Marfa
- María Gentil Arcos as Mrs. Eugenia Dubrovko
- Ana María Hernández as Yugoslav village girl
- Rafael Icardo as Constable
- María Elena Marqués as Ana
- Ricardo Montalbán as Stefan
- José Morcillo as Mr. Aramich
- Joaquín Pardavé as Glinko
- José Ignacio Rocha as Train passenger
- Humberto Rodríguez as Priest
- Ángel T. Sala as Iván Banka
- Andrés Soler as Stojak
- Jorge Treviño as Yanko
- Julio Villarreal as Mr. Anton Dubrovko

== Production ==
There are reports that Cinco fueron escogidos was simultaneously shot alongside an English-language version. In this version appeared, among others, Art Smith, Victor Kilian, Howard Da Silva, Ricardo Montalbán (who also appeared in the original Spanish-language version) and Leonid Kinskey. However, there is no information as to whether this version has ever been released. Cinco fueron escogidos was produced by Alpha Films. It had its premiere in Mexico on 8 July 1943.

== Release ==
Before the film could be exhibited in Kansas, the Kansas Board of Review required the removal of all scenes of "three soldiers leaving column and retiring behind straw stack and coming out rearranging clothes."

== Bibliography ==
- García Riera, Emilio (1987). México visto por el cine extranjero. Volume 3. Ediciones Era.
- Hernández-Girbal, F. (1992). Los que pasaron por Hollywood. BPR Publishers.
- Richard, Alfred Charles (1993). Censorship and Hollywood's Hispanic image: an interpretive filmography, 1936–1955. Greenwood Press.
- Beck, Nicholas (2001). Budd Schulberg: A Bio-bibliography. Scarecrow Press.
- Wilt, David E. (2004). The Mexican Filmography. 1916 through 2001. Jefferson, NC: McFarland & Co. Inc.
