= La miel se fue de la luna =

- Directed by: Julián Soler
- Written by: Janet Alcoriza; Luis Alcoriza
- Produced by: Óscar Dancigers
- Cinematography: Jack Draper
- Edited by: Carlos Savage
- Release date: 1952
- Country: Mexico
- Language: Spanish

La miel se fue de la luna ("The Honey Went from the Moon") is a 1952 Mexican film.

== Cast ==
- Abel Salazar
- Alma Rosa Aguirre
- Sara García
- Julio Villarreal
- Antonio Monsell
