= Janet Alcoriza =

American screenwriter and actress

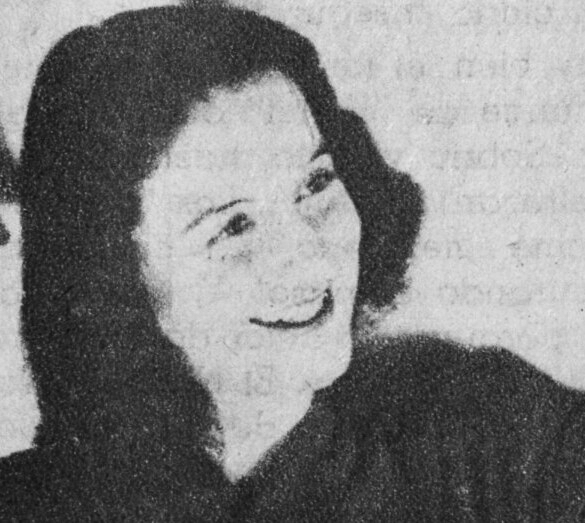
- Janet Alcoriza in 1945
- Born: Janet Riesenfeld; January 4, 1918; New York City, United States
- Died: November 12, 1998 (aged 80); Cuernavaca, Mexico
- Other names: Raquel Rojas, Janet Gaye, Raquel Alcoriza
- Occupations: Screenwriter, actress
- Years active: 1945–1987
- Spouse: Luis Alcoriza
- Parent: Hugo Riesenfeld

Janet Alcoriza (born Janet Riesenfeld; January 4, 1918 – November 12, 1998), also known as Raquel Rojas, was an American screenwriter and actress of Austrian and Scotch-Irish descent who spent most of her career in Mexico. She contributed to more than 50 films from 1945 to 1987, and early in her career was associated with Luis Buñuel.

== Biography ==
Her father, Vienna-born composer Hugo Riesenfeld, emigrated to the United States in 1907, where he met and married Mabel Dunning. The couple had Janet in 1918 in New York City.

When she was a girl, she fell in love with acting when she observed performances at the theater her father operated. She took lessons from her father's dancing teacher, and she later spent time in Mexico and Spain, which aided her in becoming fluent in Spanish. She later wrote about her experiences in Spain (which was at war at the time) in an autobiographical book.

Janet was married to Mexican screenwriter and director Luis Alcoriza.

== Selected filmography ==
As screenwriter:

- Lo que importa es vivir (1987)
- El niño y el tiburón (1978)
- Lío de faldas (1969)
- Paula (1969)
- Como perros y gatos (1969)
- Romeo contra Julieta (1968)
- Cómo pescar marido (1967)
- The Gangster (1965)
- Perdóname mi vida (1965)
- El buena suerte (1961)
- La furia del ring (1961)
- El hambre nuestra de cada día (1959)
- Me gustan valentones! (1959)
- Morir de pie (1957)
- La vida no vale nada (1955)
- La isla de las mujeres (1953)
- Don't Be Offended Beatrice (1953)
- La miel se fue de la luna (1952)
- Una gringuita en México (1951)
- Engagement Ring (1951)
- Si usted no puede, yo sí (1951)
- Daughter of Deceit (1951)
- La liga de las muchachas (1950)
- Tú, solo tú (1950)
- The Great Madcap (1949)
- Flor de caña (1948)
- Nocturne of Love (1948)
- Una extraña mujer (1947)
- The Hour of Truth (1945)

As actress:

- Tlayucan (1962)
- The Exterminating Angel (1962)
- The Criminal Life of Archibaldo de la Cruz (1955)
- Tribunal de Justicia (1944)
- El niño de las monjas (1944)
- Tormenta en la cumbre (1943)
- Espionaje en el golfo (1943)
- I'm a Real Mexican (1942)
- The Three Musketeers (1942)
- When the Stars Travel (1942)
- Café Concordia (1939)
- Una luz en mi camino (1939)
