= Les Misérables (1943 film) =

1943 film

- Directed by: Fernando A. Rivero
- Written by: Ramón Pérez Peláez; Fernando A. Rivero; Robert Tasker
- Based on: Les Misérables by Victor Hugo
- Produced by: José Luis Calderón
- Starring: Domingo Soler; Manolita Saval; Antonio Bravo
- Cinematography: Ross Fisher
- Edited by: Mario del Río
- Music by: Elías Breeskin
- Production company: Azteca Films
- Distributed by: Azteca Films
- Release date: 8 September 1943
- Running time: 103 minutes
- Country: Mexico
- Language: Spanish

Les Misérables (Spanish: Los Miserables) is a 1943 Mexican historical drama film directed by Fernando A. Rivero and starring Domingo Soler, Manolita Saval and Antonio Bravo. It is an adaptation of Victor Hugo's 1862 novel Les Misérables. It was shot at the Azteca Studios in Mexico City. The film's sets were designed by the art director Manuel Fontanals.

== Cast ==
- Domingo Soler as Juan Valjean
- Manolita Saval as Cosetta Ponchelevan
- Antonio Bravo as Inspector Jauvert
- Margarita Cortés as Eponina Thenadier
- Emma Roldán as Madame Thenardier
- Luis Alcoriza asJuan Prouvaire
- Francisco Jambrina as Enjolras
- Manuel Noriega asGuillernormand
- Guillermo Familiar as Camarada de Mario
- Arturo Soto Rangel as Monsignor Bienvenido Myriel
- Virginia Manzano as Fantina
- José Ortiz de Zárate as Prefecto
- Alicia Rodríguez as Cozetta niña
- Lupita Torrentera as Azelma
- Enrique García Álvarez as Abogado defensor
- Adelina Vehi as Madre abadesa
- Roberto Corell as Bautista
- Andrés Novo as Casero
- José Mora as Joyero
- Alfredo Varela padre as Doctor
- Max Langler as Cochepaille
- Chel López as Chenildieu
- Ricardo Avendaño as Brevet
- Gerardo del Castillo as Fiscal
- David Silva asMario de Pontmercy
- Andrés Soler as Thenardier

== See also ==
- Adaptations of Les Misérables

== Bibliography ==
- Behr, Edward. Les Misérables: History in the Making. Cape, 1989.
- Goble, Alan. The Complete Index to Literary Sources in Film. Walter de Gruyter, 1999.
