= Amor y sexo =

1964 film

Amor y sexo (Safo '63)
- Directed by: Luis Alcoriza
- Written by: Julio Porter; Fernando Galiana
- Based on: Sappho by Alphonse Daudet
- Produced by: Gregorio Walerstein
- Starring: María Félix; Julio Alemán; Julio Aldama; Augusto Benedico; Jose Gálvez; Fernando Luján; Rogelio Guerra
- Cinematography: Rosalio Solna
- Edited by: Rafael Ceballos
- Music by: Sergio Guerrero
- Release date: 5 May 1964
- Running time: 110 minutes
- Country: Mexico
- Language: Spanish

Amor y sexo (Safo '63) ("Love and Sex (Sappho '63)") is a 1964 Mexican film. It was directed by Luis Alcoriza and starred María Félix and Julio Alemán. It was premiered in Mexico on 5 May 1964. The movie is based on the French writer Alphonse Daudet's novel Sappho.

== Plot ==
Diana (María Félix) is a mature woman with a life full of romantic adventures, living a life of prostitution and drugs in Mexico's high society. Diana falls in love with Raul (Julio Alemán), a man 10 years younger than her. Diana harbours a big secret in the form of a former lover, whom she visits in prison every week. Soon, Diana's life and her past become a torment for Raúl.

== Cast ==
- María Félix - Diana
- Julio Alemán - Raúl Solana
- Julio Aldama - Mauricio
- Augusto Benedico - Carlos
- José Gálvez - Licenciado Miguel Gaudal
- Laura Garcés - Laura
- Fernando Luján - "Gallina"
- Rogelio Guerra - Interno
