= Los amores de una viuda =

- Directed by: Julián Soler
- Written by: Luis Alcoriza
- Release date: 1949
- Running time: 100 minute
- Country: Mexico
- Language: Spanish

Los amores de una viuda ("The Loves of a Widow") is a 1949 Mexican film. It was written by Luis Alcoriza.
