= Tlayucan =

- Directed by: Luis Alcoriza
- Screenplay by: Luis Alcoriza
- Based on: Tlayucan by Jesús Murciélago Velázquez
- Produced by: Antonio Matouk
- Starring: Julio Aldama; Norma Angélica Ladrón de Guevara
- Cinematography: Rosalío Solano
- Release date: 27 December 1962
- Running time: 105 minutes
- Country: Mexico
- Language: Spanish

Tlayucan is a 1962 Mexican comedy film directed by Luis Alcoriza and based on a novel by Jesús Murciélago Velázquez. It was nominated for the Academy Award for Best Foreign Language Film.

== Plot ==
Desperate due to his son's illness, the peasant Eufemio resorts to stealing a pearl from the statue of Saint Lucía in the village church. The theft is captured by some tourists, and Eufemio finds himself on the brink of being lynched by his enraged neighbors. The pearl vanishes, swallowed by one of the pigs belonging to Chabela, Eufemio's wife. Only the timely intervention of Don Tomás spares Eufemio from his fate, although the precious pearl remains elusive.

Some time later, the pearl mysteriously reappears within Eufemio's home, discovered by his wife. Its loss has profound repercussions on the collective well-being of the townsfolk. Eventually, the pearl is quietly returned without anyone knowing, its restoration whispered to be nothing short of miraculous.

== Cast ==
- Julio Aldama as Eufemio Zárate
- Norma Angélica Ladrón de Guevara as Chabela
- Andrés Soler as Don Carlos
- Anita Blanch as Prisca
- Noé Murayama as Matías
- Juan Carlos Ortiz as Nico (as niño Juan Carlos Ortíz)
- Pancho Córdova as Sacristán
- Eric del Castillo as Doroteo
- Dolores Camarillo as Dolores (as Dolores Camarillo 'Fraustita')
- Antonio Bravo as Doctor
- Amado Zumaya as Máximo
- Joaquín Martínez

== Production ==
Filming took place in Oaxtepec, Morelos.

== See also ==
- List of submissions to the 35th Academy Awards for Best Foreign Language Film
- List of Mexican submissions for the Academy Award for Best Foreign Language Film
