= Rubén Rojo =

Spanish-Mexican actor (1922–1993)

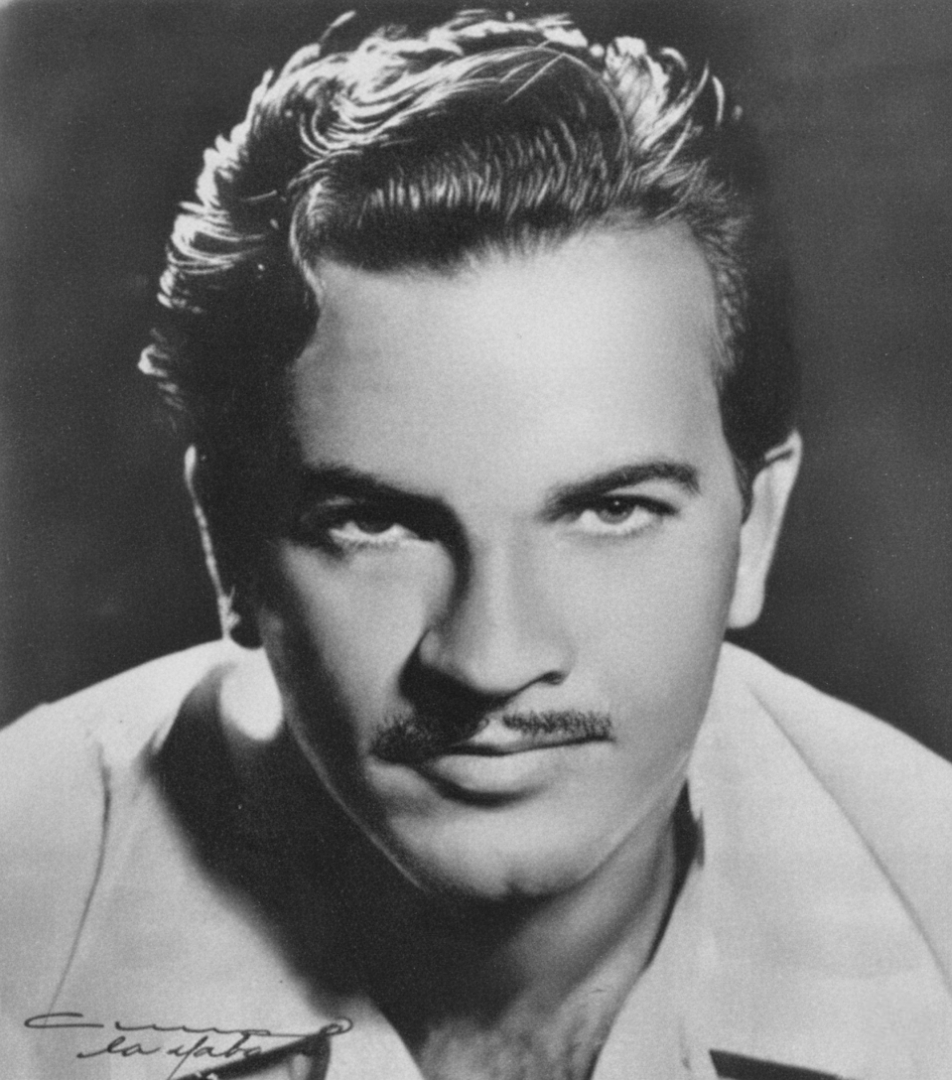
- Rojo in 1951
- Born: Rubén Rojo Pinto; 15 December 1922; Madrid, Spain
- Died: 30 March 1993 (aged 70); Mexico City, Mexico
- Occupation: Actor
- Years active: 1938–1993

Rubén Rojo Pinto (15 December 1922 – 30 March 1993) was a Spanish-Mexican actor.

== Early life ==
He was born in Madrid, the son of the lawyer Rubén Rojo Martín de Nicolás and the writer and poet Mercedes Pinto. His brother was the actor Gustavo Rojo and his sister is the actress Pituka de Foronda; in turn, he was the uncle of the actress Ana Patricia Rojo.

== Death ==
Rojo died on 30 March 1993 in Mexico City at the age of 70, due to an acute myocardial infarction, exacerbated chronic bronchitis, and systematic arterial hypertension. His body was buried in his family tomb located within the plot of the National Association of Actors (ANDA) of the Panteón Jardín, located in the same city.

== Selected filmography ==
- Ahora seremos felices (1938) - Radio Station boy #2 (uncredited)
- My Children (1944) - Eduardo
- Imprudencia (1944)
- Adam, Eve and the Devil (1945)
- Escuadrón 201 (1945) - Manuel Ceballos
- Sol y sombra (1946)
- El puente del castigo (1946)
- Smoke in the Eyes (1946) - Juan Manuel
- Soledad (1947) - Carlos
- Cortesã (1948)
- Algo flota sobre el agua (1948) - Lalo
- Dueña y señora (1948) - Luis
- El dolor de los hijos (1949) - Librado
- Cuando baja la marea (1949)
- La hija del penal (1949) - Ernesto del Villar
- The Great Madcap (1949) - Pablo
- Un cuerpo de mujer (1949) - Javier
- La liga de las muchachas (1950) - Pablo
- Un grito en la noche (1950)
- Mujeres en mi vida (1950) - Javier Arias
- Cabellera blanca (1950) - Roberto Palacios
- Mala hembra (1950)
- El sol sale para todos (1950)
- Aventurera (1951) - Mario Cervera
- In the Flesh (1951) - Arturo
- La reina del mambo (1951)
- El gendarme de la esquina (1951) - Luis
- Sensuality (1951) - Raúl Luque
- Daughter of Deceit (1951) - Paco
- We Maids (1951) - Felipe
- The Girl at the Inn (1951) - Juan Luis / Carlos de Osuna
- La boca (1951)
- The Trace of Some Lips (1952) - Felipe Rivas
- La loca (1952) - Esteban de la Garza
- Estrella of the Sierra Morena (1952) - Carlos
- Women's Town (1953) - Adolfo
- The Seducer of Granada (1953) - Carlos
- Two Paths (1954) - Miguel
- Cursed Mountain (1954) - Juan
- It Happened in Seville (1955) - Juan Antonio
- Alexander the Great (1956) - Philotas
- The Legion of Silence (1956) - Chapek
- Embajadores en el Infierno (1956) - Teniente Luis Durán
- Le schiave di Cartagine (1956) - Flavius Metellus
- Horas de pánico (1957)
- Amore a prima vista (1958) - Principe Carlos
- La frontera del miedo (1958) - Pablo Beltrán
- Ama a tu prójimo (1958) - Abel
- Las locuras de Bárbara (1959)
- La mujer y la bestia (1959) - Martín
- Venta de Vargas (1959) - Capitán Pierre
- El amor que yo te di (1960) - Raúl
- Thaimí, la hija del pescador (1960) - Julio
- Fountain of Trevi (1960) - Roberto Proietti
- King of Kings (1961) - Matthew
- Ahí vienen los Argumedo (1962)
- The Brainiac (1962) - Reynaldo Miranda / Marcos Miranda
- Vuelven los Argumedo (1963)
- Santo in the Wax Museum (1963) - Ricardo Carbajal
- Condenados a muerte (1963) - Armando Salas
- Neutrón contra el criminal sádico (1964) - Oswaldo
- For One Thousand Dollars Per Day (1966) - Jason Clark
- Our Man in Casablanca (1966) - Shannon
- Cargamento prohibido (1966) - Roberto
- Requiem for a Gringo (1968) - Tom Leader
- They Came to Rob Las Vegas (1968) - Brian (uncredited)
- La esclava del paraíso (1968) - Ali
- Battle of the Last Panzer (1969) - Sgt. Schultz
- Relaciones casi públicas (1969) - Julián
- Siete minutos para morir (1969) - Al Monks / Domenico Lomonaco
- Cauldron of Blood (1970) - Pablo
- El huésped del sevillano (1970) - Diego de Peñalva
- El último día de la guerra (1970) - Pvt. O'Brien
- El juicio de los hijos (1971) - Alejandro
- Rimal min dhahab (1971)
- El látigo contra Satanás (1979) - Padre
- La dinastía de Dracula (1980) - Don Carlos Solórzano
- Mexican, You Can Do It (1985) - Sr. Rivera
- ¡Yerba sangrienta! (1986)
- Romero (1989) - Archbishop Chavez
- Bandas guerreras (1989)
- Víctimas de un asesino (1990) - Don Luis
- La mafia en Jalisco (1991) - (final film role)

== Bibliography ==
- Raymond Durgnat. Luis Bunuel. University of California Press, 1977.
