= Skeleton of Mrs. Morales =

1960 Mexican black comedy film by Rogelio A. González

El Esqueleto de la señora Morales (The Skeleton of Mrs. Morales)
- Directed by: Rogelio A. González
- Written by: Luis Alcoriza; Arthur Machen (story)
- Produced by: Sergio Kogán
- Starring: Arturo de Córdova; Amparo Rivelles; Antonio Bravo; Angelines Fernández; Luis Aragón; Guillermo Orea; Rosenda Monteros; Elda Peralta; Mercedes Pascual; Paz Villegas; Roberto Meyer; Jorge Mondragón; Armando Arriola
- Cinematography: Victor Herrera
- Music by: Raúl Lavistae
- Release date: 26 May 1960
- Running time: Theatrical cut: 92 min.
- Country: Mexico
- Language: Spanish

The Skeleton of Mrs. Morales (Spanish: El Esqueleto de la señora Morales) is a 1960 Mexican black comedy film based on Arthur Machen’s 1927 short story "The Islington Mystery". It is regarded by critics as one of the best Mexican films of all time.

In the film, a taxidermist is unhappily married to a religious fanatic who maliciously torments him. After the wife breaks his new camera, he poisons her to death and puts her skeleton on display.

== Plot ==
Pablo Morales (Arturo de Córdova) is a cheerful taxidermist, who lives with his bitter, crippled, obsessive, and extremely religious wife Gloria (Amparo Rivelles). Pablo wants to have children, but Gloria does not. Gloria constantly rebuffs his amorous advances, and constantly belittles him by telling him that he stinks of dead animals. Her primary reason for existence seems to be maliciously annoying her husband.

Pablo has been saving money to buy a camera, but Gloria takes the money Pablo was saving and gives it to the church, leading to conflict with the local priest. Gloria falsely accuses Pablo of drunkenness and abuse. Pablo gets his camera, but Gloria maliciously breaks it, which proves to be the straw that breaks the camel's back.

Pablo takes his revenge by poisoning her. He then dissects Gloria's body and places her skeleton in the front window of his shop. The police and local priest become suspicious and he is put on trial, but he manages to escape man's justice (but not God's).

== Cast ==
- Arturo de Córdova — Dr. Pablo Morales
- Amparo Rivelles — Gloria de Morales
- Elda Peralta
- Guillermo Orea — Profesor
- Rosenda Monteros — Meche
- Luis Aragón — Elodio
- Mercedes Pascual — Lourditas Mendiolea
- Antonio Bravo — Padre Artemio Familiar
- Angelines Fernández — Clara, sister of Gloria

== Production ==
Arthur Machen's original 1927 essay, "The Islington Mystery", which can be found in his collection The Cosy Room, was based largely on the case of the famous murderer Dr. Crippen. Screenwriter Luis Alcoriza was influenced by his association with Luis Buñuel.

== Reception ==
This film is ranked 19 in the list of the 100 best films of Mexican cinema, in the opinion of 25 film critics and experts on Mexico, published by the magazine Somos in July 1994.
