= El muro del silencio =

- Directed by: Luis Alcoriza
- Written by: Luis Alcoriza; Julio Alejandro; Fernando Galiana
- Produced by: Jaime Alfaro; Ramiro Meléndez
- Starring: Brontis Jodorowsky; Fabiola Falcón; David Reynoso; Claudio Brook; Milton Rodríguez; Armando Silvestre
- Cinematography: Ángel Bilbatúa
- Edited by: Carlos Savage
- Music by: José Antonio Alcaraz; Rubén Fuentes
- Release date: 31 January 1974
- Running time: 105 minutes
- Country: Mexico
- Language: Spanish

El muro del silencio ("The Wall of Silence") is a 1974 Mexican film starring Brontis Jodorowsky. It was directed by Luis Alcoriza. The film was shot in 1972 in Bogotá and Santa Marta, Magdalena, Colombia, and released 31 January 1974. In 1973, the film music secured José Antonio Alcaraz and Rubén Fuentes the Silver Ariel for the best score (Ariel a Mejor Música de Fondo).
