= Engagement Ring (film) =

- Directed by: Emilio Gómez Muriel
- Written by: Luis Alcoriza, Janet Alcoriza, and Edmundo Báez
- Starring: David Silva, Martha Roth and Carmen Montejo
- Release date: 1 November 1951
- Running time: 100 minutes
- Country: Mexico
- Language: Spanish

Engagement Ring (Spanish: Anillo de compromiso) is a 1951 Mexican drama film directed by Emilio Gómez Muriel and starring David Silva, Martha Roth and Carmen Montejo. It was written by Luis Alcoriza.

== Cast ==
- David Silva
- Martha Roth
- Carmen Montejo
- Andrés Soler
- Miguel Manzano
- Felipe de Alba
- José María Linares-Rivas
- Nicolás Rodríguez
- Cuco Sánchez
- Beatriz Ramos
- Armando Arriola
- Francisco Reiguera
- Olga Donoso
- Juan Pulido
- Diana Ochoa
