= Tac-tac =

1982 film

- Directed by: Luis Alcoriza
- Written by: Luis Alcoriza; Antonio Monsell
- Produced by: Juan José Daza
- Starring: Héctor Alterio
- Cinematography: Carlos Suárez
- Edited by: José Luis Peláez
- Production companies: Alcion Film; Peliculas Trio
- Release date: 1982
- Running time: 98 minutes
- Country: Mexico
- Language: Spanish

Tac-tac is a 1982 Mexican film. It was directed by Luis Alcoriza.
