= Las fuerzas vivas =

- Directed by: Luis Alcoriza
- Written by: Luis Alcoriza; Juan de la Cadaba
- Produced by: Francisco Trouyet; Roberto Trouyet
- Starring: David Reynoso; Armando Silvestre; Héctor Lechuga
- Cinematography: Rosalío Solano
- Edited by: Rafael Ceballos
- Music by: Rubén Fuentes
- Release date: November 20, 1975
- Running time: 103 minutes
- Country: Mexico
- Language: Spanish

Las fuerzas vivas ("The Living Forces") is a 1975 Mexican war comedy-drama film. It was directed by Luis Alcoriza.
