= A paso de cojo =

- Directed by: Luis Alcoriza
- Screenplay by: Luis Alcoriza; Antonio Monsell
- Based on: novel by Eduardo Valdivia
- Cinematography: Gabriel Figueroa
- Edited by: Carlos Savage
- Release date: 1980
- Running time: 120 minutes
- Country: Mexico
- Language: Spanish

A paso de cojo (English: Lame Step) is a 1980 Mexican film. It was directed by Luis Alcoriza. The film is set during the Cristero War and about a group of villagers getting involved in it.
