= María Natividad Venegas de la Torre =

Mexican Roman Catholic nun

Saint María Natividad Venegas de la Torre
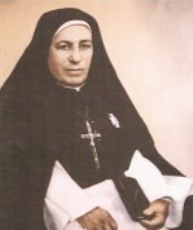

Virgin
- Born: 8 September 1868; Zapotlanejo, Jalisco, Mexico
- Died: 30 July 1959 (aged 90); Guadalajara, Jalisco, Mexico
- Venerated in: Roman Catholic Church
- Beatified: 22 November 1992, Mexico City, Mexico by Pope John Paul II
- Canonized: 21 May 2000, Saint Peter's Basilica, Vatican City by Pope John Paul II
- Feast: 30 July

María Natividad Venegas de la Torre (religious name María of Jesus in the Blessed Sacrament, 8 September 1868 – 30 July 1959) was a Mexican religious sister in the Roman Catholic Church. Torre founded the congregation of the Daughters of the Sacred Heart of Jesus of Guadalajara (Congregationem Sororum Filiarum Sacri Cordis Iesu) in 1930.

== Life ==
María Natividad Venegas de la Torre was born on 8 September 1868 in Mexico as the last of twelve children. Her mother died when she was sixteen and the family suffered financial hardships after this as a result. Her father died when she was nineteen, and she was taken in by a paternal aunt. A pious child, she spent her time giving religious instruction to neighbors and also cared for those who were poor.

Venegas joined the Association of the Daughters of Mary on the Feast of the Immaculate Conception 1898. Later, she established a small group of women devoted to the plight of the ill. She served in this capacity as a nurse as well as a bookkeeper and pharmacist. She entered religious life in 1905 and made her vows in 1910.

Torre established the Daughters of the Sacred Heart of Jesus of Guadalajara and was elected as Superior General of the new congregation on 25 January 1921. The constitutions were approved in 1930. Venegas de la Torre worked for donations to establish a residence for the sisters in 1922, and this occurred during a period of widespread religious persecution during the Cristero Rebellion. During this period, she continued to operate a hospital and it only served to strengthen her congregation throughout this period. She catered to the needs of priests as well as seminarians. She died in 1959.

== Veneration ==
=== The Beatification process ===
The beatification process commenced in Guadalajara on 19 June 1980 in a local process that saw the accumulation both documentation and witness testimonies. The commencement of the process conferred upon her the posthumous title Servant of God. The process spanned from 18 March 1981 until 7 April 1983 - it received the formal decree of ratification on 9 April 1984 in order for the cause to proceed to the next phase. The positio was submitted to the Congregation for the Causes of Saints in 1987 for further evaluation. Venegas de la Torre was proclaimed to be Venerable on 13 May 1989 after Pope John Paul II recognized that she had lived an exemplary Christian life of heroic virtue.

The miracle for beatification was investigated locally in 1987 and was ratified in 1990. John Paul II approved the miracle in 1991 and beatified her in St. Peter's Basilica on 22 November 1992.

A second miracle was also investigated and the process was ratified in 1995. The miracle regarded Anastasio Ledezma Mora who was taken to her hospital for a surgical procedure. His heart rate slowly declined until total stoppage, and resuscitation techniques were tried in vain until he fell into a coma. Doctors and nurses, as well as his family, prayed for Venegas de la Torre's intercession. The patient's heart rate was restored after around ten minutes and he did not suffer any damage. John Paul II approved the miracle on 26 March 1999 and canonized Venegas de la Torre on 21 May 2000.
