= Fountain of Trevi (film) =

1960 film directed by Carlo Campogalliani

- Directed by: Carlo Campogalliani
- Written by: Giuliano Carnimeo; Riccardo Ghione; Gianfranco Parolini; Jaime Salom; Giorgio Simonelli; Barbara Tai; Federico Zardi
- Starring: Claudio Villa; Rubén Rojo; Carlo Croccolo
- Cinematography: Emilio Foriscot; Francesco Izzarelli
- Edited by: Franco Fraticelli
- Production companies: AIT; Cinematografica Associati (CI.AS.); Cineprodex; Tiber Cinematografica
- Distributed by: Rosa Films (Spain)
- Release date: 25 September 1960
- Running time: 102 minutes
- Countries: Italy; Spain
- Language: Italian

Fountain of Trevi (Italian: Fontana di Trevi) is a 1960 Italian-Spanish comedy film directed by Carlo Campogalliani and starring Claudio Villa, Rubén Rojo and Carlo Croccolo. It follows the life of two men working for a travel agency next to Rome's Fountain of Trevi.

== Cast ==
- Claudio Villa as Claudio Marchetti
- Rubén Rojo as Roberto Proietti
- Carlo Croccolo as Wizard assistant
- Maria Grazia Buccella as Franca / Manuela
- Tiberio Murgia as Pertica
- Mario Carotenuto as The Wizard
- Marisa Mantovani
- Pilar Vela as Dolores
- Arnaldo Arnaldi as Giovanni Camilloni
- Dori Dorika as La sora Nannina
- Maria Letizia Gazzoni as Carmencita
- Amelia de Castro
- Rafael Durán
- Edda Ferronao
- Marta Grau
- Miguel Ligero
- Rosario Maldonado as Rosita
- Alfredo Mayo as Rafael Castillo
- Gisia Paradis
- Miguel Ángel Rodríguez
- Elisabetta Velinska
- Ciccio Barbi as Tax collector
- Enzo Garinei as E.T.I.B. Manage

== Bibliography ==
- Parish, James Robert. Film Actors Guide. Scarecrow Press, 1977.
