= Irma Torres =

Mexican actress (1926–2010)

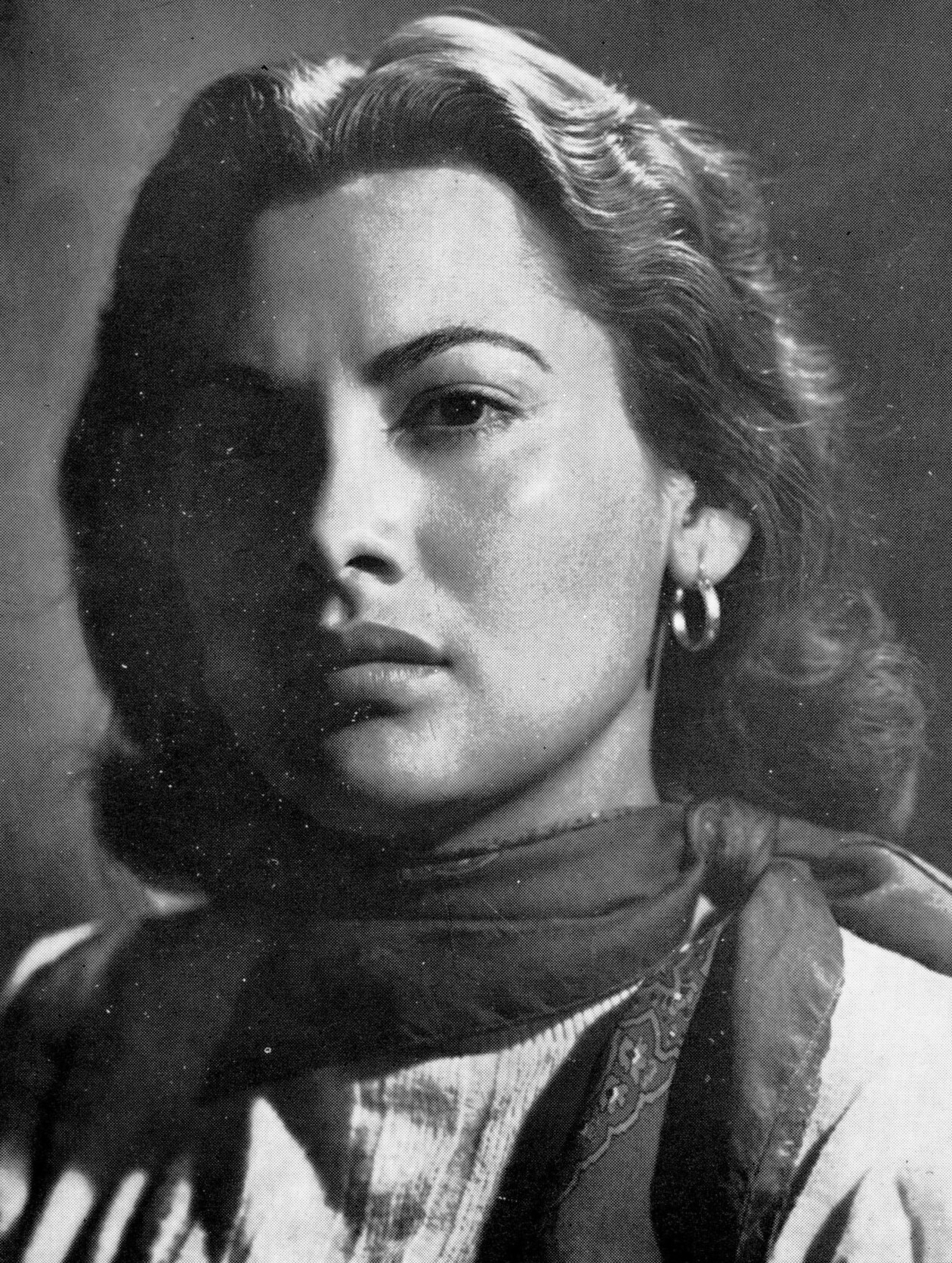
- Torres in 1954
- Born: March 9, 1926; Mexico City
- Died: June 5, 2010 (aged 84); Cuernavaca
- Years active: 1944-2002

Irma Torres (9 March 1926 - 5 June 2010) was a Mexican film and television actress during the golden age of Mexican cinema.

== Career ==
Torres began her career in 1944 in the film Maria Candelaria alongside Dolores del Rio and Pedro Armendariz. She went on to star in Flor de caña, where she won an Ariel Award for Best Actress in a Picture in 1949.

== Selected filmography ==
- My Wife Is Not Mine (1951)
