= La vida no vale nada =

- Directed by: Rogelio A. González
- Written by: Luis Alcoriza; Janet Alcoriza
- Produced by: Óscar Dancigers
- Starring: Pedro Infante, Rosario Granados, Lilia Prado
- Cinematography: José Ortiz Ramos
- Edited by: Carlos Savage
- Music by: Manuel Esperón
- Release date: 4 May 1955 (Mexico)
- Running time: 100 min
- Country: Mexico
- Language: Spanish

La vida no vale nada ("Life is Worth Nothing") is a 1955 Mexican film written by Luis Alcoriza and Janet Alcoriza and directed by Rogelio A. González and starring Pedro Infante, Rosario Granados and Lilia Prado.

== Plot ==
The film tells the story of a depressed, drunk and melancholic man, who wanders aimlessly and meets people who give him the opportunity to demonstrate his human value, but in the end he always escapes or gets depressed because of a sorrow he has inside his heart, but he will try to discover his reason for being in the world, seeing his life in retrospect and thus be able to find his destiny.

== Cast ==
- Pedro Infante as Pablo Galvan.
- Domingo Soler as Leandro, Pablo's father.
- Wolf Ruvinskis as the "Alligator".
- Lilia Prado as Martha.
- Rosario Granados as Cruz, a widowed mother of two children.
- Magda Guzmán as Silvia, a woman who falls in love with Pablo.
- Hortensia Santoveña as Pablo's mother.
- Manuel Dondé as Carmelo, Pablo's friend.
- Dolores Tinoco as "Mama Irene".
- Nacho Contla as Don Pánfilo.
- Aurora Ruiz Álvarez as Teo, Cruz's employee considered to be family.
- Ramón Valdés as Bus Driver - (uncredited).
- José Pardavé as drunken baker - (uncredited).
- Leonor Gómez as saleswoman - (uncredited).
- Paquito Fernández as Pablo's brother - (uncredited).
