= La chamuscada =

- Written by: Luis Alcoriza
- Release date: 1971
- Running time: 90 minutes
- Country: Mexico
- Language: Spanish

La chamuscada (lit. 'The Charred') is a 1971 Mexican film. It was written by Luis Alcoriza.
