= Life Is Most Important =

- Directed by: Luis Alcoriza
- Written by: Janet Alcoriza; Luis Alcoriza
- Produced by: Héctor López
- Starring: Gonzalo Vega
- Cinematography: Miguel Garzón
- Edited by: Federico Landeros
- Music by: Pedro Plascencia
- Release dates: July 1987 (Moscow); 22 October 1987 (Mexico)
- Running time: 113 minutes
- Country: Mexico
- Language: Spanish

Life Is Most Important (Spanish: Lo que importa es vivir) is a 1987 Mexican drama film directed by Luis Alcoriza. It was entered into the 15th Moscow International Film Festival. The film was selected as the Mexican entry for the Best Foreign Language Film at the 60th Academy Awards, but did not garner a nomination.

== Cast ==
- Gonzalo Vega as Candelario
- Ernesto Gómez Cruz as Lázaro
- María Rojo as Chabela
- Loló Navarro as Mamá Rosita
- Alejandro Parodi as Canales
- Justo Martínez as Gabriel
- Eduardo Borja as Padre Aurelio
- Bruno Rey as Comandante
- Ramón Menéndez as Gregorio

== Accolades ==
Award / Film Festival	Date of ceremony	Category	Recipients	Result	Refs
Ariel Awards	November 14, 1988	Best Picture	Luis Alcoriza	Nominated	
Ariel Awards	November 14, 1988	Best Director	Luis Alcoriza	Nominated	
Ariel Awards	November 14, 1988	Best Actor	Gonzalo Vega	Won	
Ariel Awards	November 14, 1988	Best Actress	María Rojo	Won	
Ariel Awards	November 14, 1988	Best Original Screenplay	Luis Alcoriza	Nominated	
Goya Awards	March 22, 1988	Best Spanish Language Foreign Film	Luis Alcoriza	Won	

== See also ==
- List of submissions to the 60th Academy Awards for Best Foreign Language Film
- List of Mexican submissions for the Academy Award for Best Foreign Language Film
