= Noé Murayama =

Mexican actor (1930–1997)

- Born: 4 July 1930; Ciudad del Maíz, San Luis Potosí, Mexico
- Died: August 25, 1997 (aged 67); Mexico City, Mexico
- Children: Claudio Rojo

Noé Murayama Tudón (July 4, 1930 – August 25, 1997) was a Mexican actor. He appeared in over 160 film and television roles between 1956 and 1997, and was nominated for an Ariel Award for Best Actor for his performance in La Pachanga (1981).

== Biography ==
Noé was born in Ciudad del Maíz in the state of San Luis Potosí, Mexico. His father was Japanese Mexican. His name is a Spanish form of the name Noah.

Noé studied to be a dentist.

He played a key role in the Mexican soap opera El pecado de Oyuki. He also appeared in Esmeralda as Fermín.

His son is actor Claudio Rojo.

== Selected filmography ==
- Nazarín (1959)
- Tlayucan (1962)
- Tiburoneros (1963)
- El hombre de papel (1963)
- Man on the Spying Trapeze (1966)
- Guns for San Sebastian (1968)
