= Daughter of Deceit =

- Theatrical poster
- Spanish: La hija del engaño
- Directed by: Luis Buñuel
- Written by: Luis Alcoriza
- Produced by: Óscar Dancigers
- Starring: Fernando Soler; Alicia Caro; Fernando Soto "Mantequilla"; Rubén Rojo; Lily Aclemar
- Cinematography: Jose Ortiz Ramos
- Edited by: Carlos Savage
- Music by: Manuel Esperon
- Release date: 29 August 1951 (Mexico)
- Running time: 78 minutes
- Country: Mexico
- Language: Spanish

Daughter of Deceit (Spanish: La hija del engaño) is a 1951 Mexican film directed by Luis Buñuel, written by Luis and Janet Alcoriza and starring Fernando Soler, Alicia Caro and Fernando Soto "Mantequilla". It is based on the farce Don Quintín, el amargao by Carlos Arniches and Antonio Estremera.

The film is part of the "generic, assembly-line pictures that Buñuel was offered to direct" while he was making films in Mexico. Buñuel had previously been a scriptwriter, although uncredited, for an earlier film adaptation of Don Quintín, el amargao made in his native Spain in 1935. As a result, it is the only work of which Buñuel made two versions.

== Plot ==
Don Quintin, a man who is always having economic problems, one day comes home to find his wife in bed with another man. He begins having doubts about the paternity of his daughter and decides to leave. Years later he decides to find her.

== Cast ==
- Fernando Soler as Quintín Guzmán
- Alicia Caro as Martha
- Fernando Soto "Mantequilla" as Angelito
- Rubén Rojo as Paco
- Nacho Contla as Jonrón
- Amparo Garrido as Jovita
- Lily Aclemar as María
- Álvaro Matute as Julio
- Roberto Meyer as Lencho García
- Conchita Gentil Arcos as Toña García
- Francisco Ledesma as Don Laureano, bartender
- Armando Acosta as Waiter (uncredited)
- Armando Arriola as Gambler (uncredited)
- Victorio Blanco as Gambler (uncredited)
- Lupe Carriles as Woman on the street (uncredited)
- Enrique Carrillo as Policeman (uncredited)
- Gerardo del Castillo as Cabaret announcer (uncredited)
- Enedina Díaz de León as Neighbor (uncredited)
- José Escanero as Gambler (uncredited)
- Jesús García as Onlooker in accident (uncredited)
- Isabel Herrera como Onlooker in accident (uncredited).
- Cecilia Leger as Neighbor (uncredited).
- Xavier Loyá as Young gambler (uncredited)
- Pepe Martínez como Bartender (uncredited)
- Lucrecia Muñoz as Client in cabaret (uncredited)
- Rubén Márquez as Man dancing in cabaret (uncredited)
- Ignacio Peón as Client (uncredited)
- Jorge Pérez as Gossipy young man (uncredited)
- Salvador Quiroz as Manager at train station (uncredited)
- Polo Ramos as Messenger (uncredited)
- Joaquín Roche as Man in restaurant (uncredited)
- Félix Samper as Old man kicked (uncredited)
- Hernán Vera as Lencho's friend (uncredited)
- Acela Vidaurri as Client in cabaret (uncredited)

== See also ==
- Mexican films of 1951
