= Morir de pie =

- Directed by: Rafael Baledón
- Written by: Janet Alcoriza; Luis Alcoriza
- Produced by: Antonio del Castillo
- Starring: Guillermo Cramer; Manuel Dondé; Chel López
- Cinematography: Enrique Wallace
- Edited by: Juan José Marino
- Music by: Sergio Guerrero
- Release date: 8 May 1957
- Running time: 85 minutes
- Country: Mexico
- Language: Spanish

Morir de pie (English: Die Standing) is a 1957 Mexican film. It was written by Janet and Luis Alcoriza.
