= ...Y mañana serán mujeres =

- Directed by: Alejandro Galindo
- Written by: Luis Alcoriza, Fernando Galiana
- Release date: 1955
- Country: Mexico
- Language: Spanish

...Y mañana serán mujeres (English: ...And Tomorrow They Will Be Women) is a 1955 Mexican drama film directed by Alejandro Galindo. It was written by Luis Alcoriza. The film is credited for being one of the earliest films in Mexican cinema to exploit emerging popular music in the 1950s.

== Cast ==
- Magda Urvizu
- Miguel Arenas
- Manuel Arvide
- Antonio Bravo
- Roberto Cañedo
- Alberto Catalá
- José Chávez
- Jaime Fernández
- Sonia Furió
- María Gentil Arcos
- Maruja Grifell
- Sara Guasch
- Carmen Ignarra
- Dalia Íñiguez
- Salvador Lozano Mena
- Bruno Márquez
