= Romeo contra Julieta =

- Directed by: Julián Soler
- Written by: Luis Alcoriza; Janet Alcoriza
- Produced by: Pedro Galindo
- Starring: Angelica Maria; Alberto Vázquez
- Cinematography: Ignacio Torres
- Edited by: Jorge Busto
- Release date: 1968
- Running time: 103 minute
- Country: Mexico
- Language: Spanish

Romeo contra Julieta ("Romeo Versus Juliet") is a 1968 Mexican comedy film written by Luis Alcoriza and Janet Alcoriza, directed by Julián Soler and starring Angelica Maria and Alberto Vázquez.
