= Rosa de las nieves =

- Release date: 1944
- Country: Mexico
- Language: Spanish

Rosa de las nieves ("Rose of the Snows") is a 1944 Mexican romance, drama film. It stars Luis Alcoriza.
