= La Torre de los suplicios =

- Release date: 1941
- Country: Mexico
- Language: Spanish

La Torre de los suplicios ("The Tower of Torture") is a 1941 Mexican film. It stars Luis Alcoriza.
