= Cauldron of Blood =

- Spanish theatrical poster
- Directed by: Santos Alcocer (aka Edward Mann)
- Written by: John Nelson, José Luis Bayonas
- Starring: Boris Karloff; Viveca Linfors; Dyanik Zurakowska; Jean-Pierre Aumont
- Cinematography: Francisco Sempre
- Music by: José Luis Navarro, Ray Ellis
- Distributed by: Cannon Films (US theatrical); Paramount Pictures (Home Vídeo)
- Release dates: 1970 (Spain); August 1971 (U.S.)
- Running time: 90 minutes
- Country: Spain
- Language: English

Cauldron of Blood (Original title: El Coleccionista de cadáveres/ The Corpse Collector), also known in USA as Blind Man's Bluff, is a 1970 horror film filmed in Spain and directed by Santos Alcocer, credited as "Edward Mann". The film stars Boris Karloff and Viveca Lindfors. It was filmed in the Spring of 1967, but only released theatrically in 1970 in Spain, a year after Karloff's death. It was later theatrically released in the US by Cannon Films in August, 1971.

== Plot ==
Karloff plays a blind sculptor named Franz Badulescu, who uses the skeletons of actual dead people to create works of art. Unbeknownst to him, his wife is murdering people to provide him with skeletons, and is plotting to eventually kill Franz as well.

== Cast ==
- Jean-Pierre Aumont as Claude Marchand
- Boris Karloff as Franz Badulescu
- Viveca Lindfors as Tania Badulescu
- Dyanik Zurakowska as Elga
- Milo Quesada as Shanghai
- Rosenda Monteros as Valerie
- Rubén Rojo as Pablo
- Carmen Rojo as The Gypsy Queen
- Manuel de Blas as Lenny
- Jaqui Speed as Pilar (as Eduardo Coutelen)
- Mary Lou Palermo as the Stewardess

== Release ==
United Commonwealth/NTA Television purchased US distribution and TV rights from Cannon Films after the U.S. theatrical run. It was released on VHS and region 0 DVD in the United Kingdom only. The DVD included a bonus episode The Silver Curtain from Karloff's 1954 TV series Colonel March of Scotland Yard.

In 2012, Olive Films gave Cauldron of Blood its first-ever U.S. home video release on DVD and Blu-Ray. Olive's release utilized a surviving print from Cannon Films' owner MGM, and produced under licence from U.S. rights' holder Paramount (who obtained those rights from the purchase of Republic Pictures/Spelling Entertainment, which also included the Commonwealth/ NTA library).
