= When the Stars Travel =

1942 film

- Directed by: Alberto Gout
- Written by: Alberto Gout; Paulino Masip
- Produced by: Agustín J. Fink
- Starring: Jorge Negrete; Ángel Garasa; Janet Alcoriza
- Cinematography: Gabriel Figueroa
- Edited by: Emilio Gómez Muriel
- Music by: Manuel Esperón
- Production company: Films Mundiales
- Release date: 5 June 1942
- Running time: 108 minutes
- Country: Mexico
- Language: Spanish

When the Stars Travel (Spanish: Cuando viajan las estrellas) is a 1942 Mexican comedy film directed by Alberto Gout and starring Jorge Negrete, Ángel Garasa and Janet Alcoriza. It was shot at the Clasa Studios in Mexico City. The film's sets were designed by the art director Jorge Fernández.

== Synopsis ==
A Hollywood film star travels to Mexico to learn the flamenco for her next production. At the airport she encounters a rancher and the two get off on the wrong foot.

== Cast ==
- Jorge Negrete as Fernando Lazo
- Ángel Garasa as Don Niceto Pérez
- Domingo Soler as Ángel
- Janet Alcoriza as Olivia O'Neill
- Consuelo Guerrero de Luna as Tía Laura
- Alfredo Varela as Roberto Méndez
- Lupe del Castillo as Doña Presente
- Gabriel Soto as Torero
- Eddy Larry as Tom
- Edmundo Espino as Gerente hotel
- Salvador Quiroz as Detective policía

== Bibliography ==
- Alfaro, Eduardo de la Vega. Alberto Gout (1907-1966). Cineteca Nacional, 1988.
- Noriega, Chon A. & Ricci, Steven. The Mexican Cinema Project. UCLA Film and Television Archive, 1994.
- Wilt, David E. Stereotyped Images of United States Citizens in Mexican Cinema, 1930-1990. University of Maryland at College Park, 1991.
