= The King of Mexico =

1956 Mexican film

- Directed by: Rafael Baledon
- Written by: Luis Alcoriza
- Starring: Adalberto Martínez «Resortes», Silvia Derbez, Elda Peralta
- Cinematography: Gunther Gerzso; Víctor Herrera
- Edited by: Jorge Bustos
- Music by: Raul Lavista
- Release date: 1956
- Country: Mexico
- Language: Spanish

The King of Mexico (Spanish:El rey de México) is a 1956 Mexican comedy film directed by Rafael Baledon and starring Adalberto Martínez «Resortes», Silvia Derbez and Elda Peralta.

== Plot ==
A local radio station decides to try out an experiment and offers the first homeless man that walks by the chance of becoming a millionaire for a day. The fortunate man, Pablo Rojas (Adalberto Martinez), sleeps with other homeless people on the floor of a shelter. After living a day of luxury, he returns to the shelter to tell his friends that the life of a millionaire was not much different from their own: They ate, slept and worked whenever they wanted; the only difference was that the rich had ulcers.

== Cast ==
- Adalberto Martínez «Resortes» - Pablo Rojas
- Silvia Derbez - Toña
- Elda Peralta - Elda Negri
- José Gálvez - Raúl Olmedo
- Rafael Banquells - Actor en película
- Nicolás Rodríguez - Don Abraham
- Óscar Ortiz de Pinedo - Director de la editorial
- Antonio Bravo - Maître d'
- Conchita Gentil Arcos - Dueña de vitrina
- Carmen Fernett - Chela Santiesteban
- Enedina Díaz de León - Puestera de bebidas
- Omar Jasso - Amigo borracho de Pablo
- Guillermo Cramer - Amigo pordiosero de Pablo
- Julio Sotelo - Anunciador cabaret
- Jorge Mondragón
- José Pardavé
