= El amor es un juego extraño =

- Directed by: Luis Alcoriza
- Written by: Luis Alcoriza
- Starring: Isela Vega
- Cinematography: Ángel Bilbatuá
- Edited by: Francisco Chiu
- Music by: Gregorio García Segura
- Release date: 1983
- Running time: 90 minute
- Country: Mexico
- Language: Spanish

El amor es un juego extraño ("Love is a Strange Game") is a 1983 Mexican film. It was directed by Luis Alcoriza.
