= Semana santa en Acapulco =

- Directed by: Luis Alcoriza
- Written by: Luis Alcoriza
- Produced by: Arnulfo Delgado
- Starring: Lucha Villa; David Reynoso
- Cinematography: Luis Medina
- Edited by: Carlos Savage
- Music by: Rubén Fuentes
- Production company: Producciones del Rey
- Distributed by: Producciones del Rey
- Release date: December 3, 1981
- Running time: 90 minutes
- Country: Mexico
- Language: Spanish

Semana santa en Acapulco ("Holy Week in Acapulco") is a 1981 Mexican film. It was directed by Luis Alcoriza.
