= El oficio más antiguo del mundo =

- Directed by: Luis Alcoriza
- Written by: Luis Alcoriza
- Produced by: Mauricio Walerstein
- Starring: Maricruz Olivier; Gloria Marín; Isela Vega; Jacqueline Andere
- Cinematography: Fernando Colín
- Edited by: Sergio Soto
- Music by: Enrico Cabiati
- Production company: Cima Films
- Release date: July 2, 1970
- Running time: 93 minutes
- Country: Mexico
- Language: Spanish

El oficio más antiguo del mundo (English: The World's Oldest Profession) is a 1970 Mexican film directed by Luis Alcoriza and starring Maricruz Olivier, Gloria Marín, Jacqueline Andere, Isela Vega and Lupita Ferrer.
