= I'm a Real Mexican =

1942 film

- Directed by: Emilio Fernández
- Written by: Emilio Fernández; Robert Quigley; Raúl de Anda
- Produced by: Raúl de Anda
- Starring: Pedro Armendariz; Janet Alcoriza; David Silva
- Cinematography: Jack Draper
- Edited by: José W. Bustos
- Music by: Francisco Domínguez; Antonio Díaz Conde
- Production company: Producciones Raúl de Anda
- Release date: 13 November 1942
- Running time: 125 minutes
- Country: Mexico
- Language: Spanish

I'm a Real Mexican (Spanish: Soy puro mexicano) is a 1942 Mexican comedy thriller film directed and co-written by Emilio Fernández and starring Pedro Armendariz, Janet Alcoriza and David Silva. Its plot has drawn comparisons to the American All Through the Night released the same year. The film's sets were designed by the art director Jesús Bracho.

== Synopsis ==
A Mexican bandit escapes from jail and becomes entangled with a ring of Axis agents who are plotting an invasion of Mexico.

== Cast ==
- Pedro Armendáriz as Guadalupe Padilla
- Janet Alcoriza as Raquel
- David Silva as Juan Fernández
- Andrés Soler as Osoruki Kamasuri
- Margarita Cortés as Conchita
- Charles Rooner as Rudolph Hermann von Ricker
- Antonio Bravo as Agente X 32
- Alfredo Varela as Pepe
- Pedro Galindo
- Alejandro Cobo
- Miguel Inclán as Pedro
- Armando Soto La Marina as Ángel
- Conchita Sáenz as Mamá de Conchita
- Alfonso Bedoya
- Abelardo Guttiérez
- Egon Zappert
- Ernest Ruschin
- Modesto Luengo
- Stephen Berne as Esbirro de Rudolph
- Max Langler
- Pedro Vargas
- Luis Aguilar as Rafael
- Rogelio Fernández

== Bibliography ==
- Herzberg, Bob. Revolutionary Mexico on Film: A Critical History, 1914-2014. McFarland, 2014.
