= Hambre nuestra de cada día =

1959 film

- Directed by: Rogelio A. González
- Written by: Luis Alcoriza; Janet Alcoriza; Rogelio A. González
- Starring: Pedro Armendáriz
- Release date: 1959
- Running time: 95 minutes
- Country: Mexico
- Language: Spanish

Hambre nuestra de cada día ("Our Daily Hunger") is a 1959 Mexican drama film. It was directed by Rogelio A. González and written by Luis Alcoriza. It was entered into the 1st Moscow International Film Festival.

== Cast ==
- Pedro Armendáriz
- Rosita Quintana
- Ignacio Lopez Tarso
- Carlos Ancira
- Emma Fink
- Omar Jasso
- Diana Ochoa
- Luis Aragón
- Guillermo Bravo Sosa
- Luz María Núñez
