= The Gangster (1965 film) =

El gángster
- Directed by: Luis Alcoriza
- Written by: Janet Alcoriza
- Starring: Arturo de Córdova; Ana Luisa Peluffo; Angélica María
- Cinematography: José Ortiz Ramos
- Edited by: Rafael Ceballos
- Music by: Sergio Guerrero
- Release date: June 8, 1965
- Running time: 90 minutes
- Country: Mexico
- Language: Spanish

The Gangster (Spanish: El gángster) is a 1965 Mexican film. It was directed by Luis Alcoriza.
