= Paraíso (1970 film) =

- Directed by: Luis Alcoriza
- Written by: Luis Alcoriza
- Produced by: Juan Fernando Pérez Gavilán; Mauricio Walerstein
- Starring: Jorge Rivero; Ofelia Medina; Andrés García
- Cinematography: Fernando Colín; Genaro Hurtado
- Edited by: José Juan Munguía
- Production company: Producciones Marte
- Release date: October 8, 1970
- Running time: 106 minutes
- Country: Mexico
- Language: Spanish

Paraíso ("Paradise") is a 1970 Mexican comedy-drama film. It was directed by Luis Alcoriza.
