= Jay Jensen (athletic trainer) =

American athletic trainer

- Education: Loma Linda University
- Occupation: Athletic trainer
- Years active: 1982–2013

Jay Jensen is an American athletic trainer, most recently for the Portland Trail Blazers. He served in this role from 1994 until 2013. Previous to joining the Trail Blazers, Jensen served as athletic trainer for the Minnesota Timberwolves since 1989, when the Timberwolves first entered the NBA. Jensen worked in the NBA from 1989 until 2013.

He has also previously served as the head basketball trainer at the University of Southern California for two years and as assistant trainer for the Los Angeles Rams of the NFL for five years.

While working for the Blazers, Jensen also served as the Head Athletic Trainer for the Western Conference All-Stars in 1994 and 2012. In addition to being an athletic trainer, Jay Jensen is also a certified physical therapist.
