= Tiburoneros =

1963 Mexican film by Luis Alcoriza

- Directed by: Luis Alcoriza
- Written by: Luis Alcoriza
- Produced by: Antonio Matouk
- Starring: Julio Aldama; Dacia Gonzalez
- Cinematography: Raúl Martínez Solares
- Edited by: Carlos Savage
- Music by: Sergio Guerrero
- Production companies: Azteca Films; Producciones Matouk
- Release date: May 23, 1963
- Running time: 100 minutes
- Country: Mexico
- Language: Spanish

Tiburoneros (Spanish: Shark Hunters) is a 1963 Mexican film directed by Luis Alcoriza. The film follows a young man who has left his urban life behind to work as a simple shark fisher on the coast of Tabasco to support his family, but when he must return to Mexico City, fails to readjust. The film helped Alcoriza stand out as having "promise of being a major talent."

== Cast ==
- Julio Aldama as Aurelio
- Dacia Gonzalez as Manela
