= Tú, solo tú (film) =

- Directed by: Miguel M. Delgado
- Written by: Janet Alcoriza; Luis Alcoriza
- Cinematography: Ignacio Torres
- Edited by: Jorge Busto
- Release date: 1950
- Country: Mexico
- Language: Spanish

Tú, solo tú (You, Only You) is a 1950 Mexican film. It was written by Janet Alcoriza and Luis Alcoriza.

== Cast ==
- Rosita Quintana
- Luis Aguilar
- Luis Alcoriza
- Arturo Soto Rangel
- Dolores Camarillo
- Rina Valdarno
- Freddie Romero
- Roberto Y. Palacios
- Eufrosina García ... (as La Flaca)
- José Escanero
- José Chávez
- Ricardo Adalid
- José Pardavé
- Pascual García Peña
- Edmundo Espino
