= Rafael Muñoz (journalist) =

Mexican writer (1899–1972)

Rafael F. Muñoz (May 1, 1899 – July 2, 1972) was a Mexican journalist, novelist and writer of short stories.

== Life ==
Rafael Muñoz was born in Chihuahua on May 1, 1899 as the son of a wealthy farmer. He began his journalistic career at age 16 as a reporter of a daily newspaper in Chihuahua. He also met the Mexican Revolutionary leader Pancho Villa, which kindled his fascination with the revolution.

For his sympathy with the revolution he had to flee the country after the election of Venustiano Carranza in 1917 and worked as journalist in the southwestern United States. After the deposition of Carranza by General Álvaro Obregón in 1920, Muñoz returned to Mexico City to study journalism. He wrote for the dailies El Heraldo, El Gráfico and El Universal and later became director of El Nacional.

Rafael Muñoz became famous for his short stories and novels about the Mexican Revolution. In 1928 he published his first collection of stories called El feroz cabecilla. In 1931 he published his most famous novel ¡Vámonos con Pancho Villa!, which in 1935 became the basis of Vámonos con Pancho Villa, directed by Fernando de Fuentes.

Rafael Muñoz died in Mexico City on July 2, 1972.

== Publications ==
=== Stories ===
- El feroz cabecilla. Cuentos de la Revolución en el Norte (1928)
- El hombre malo y otros relatos (1930)
- Si me han de matar mañana (1934)

=== Novels ===
- ¡Vámonos con Pancho Villa! (1931)
- Bachimba (1934)
