= Un cuerpo de mujer =

- Written by: Luis Alcoriza
- Release date: 1949
- Country: Mexico
- Language: Spanish

Un cuerpo de mujer ("A Woman's Body") is a 1949 Mexican film. It was written by Luis Alcoriza.
