= Enrédate y verás =

- Directed by: Carlos Orellana
- Written by: Luis Alcoriza
- Release date: 1948
- Country: Mexico
- Language: Spanish

Enrédate y verás ("Get Involved and See") is a 1948 Mexican film directed by Carlos Orellana. It was written by Luis Alcoriza.
