= Mi querido capitán =

1950 film by Gilberto Martínez Solares

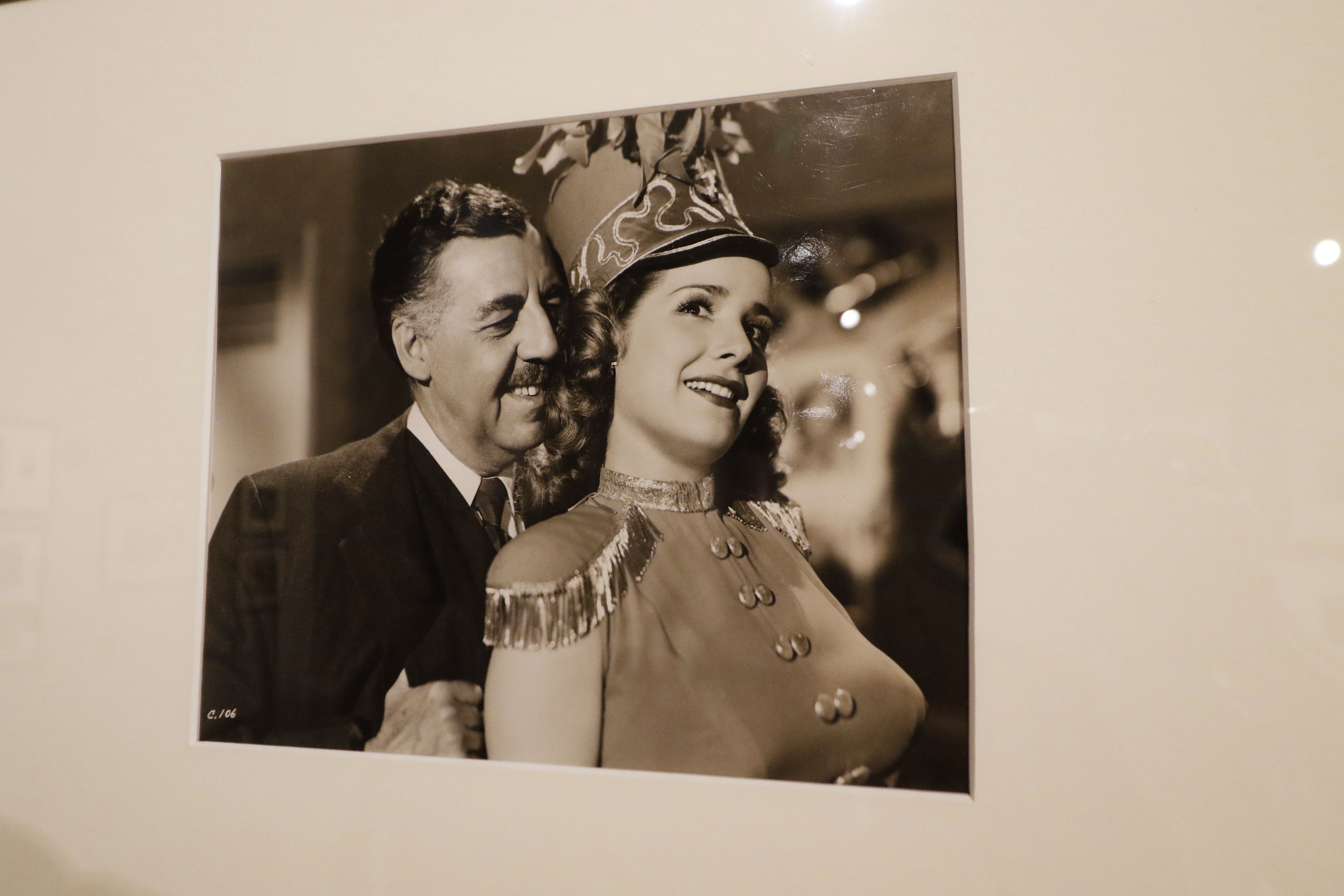
- Rosita Quintana and Fernando Soler in a publicity photograph for the film
- Directed by: Gilberto Martínez Solares
- Written by: Juan García, Gilberto Martínez Solares
- Produced by: Salvador Elizondo
- Starring: Fernando Soler, Sara García, Rosita Quintana
- Cinematography: Alex Phillips
- Edited by: Jorge Bustos
- Music by: Rosalío Ramírez
- Release date: 7 December 1950
- Running time: 76 minutes
- Country: Mexico
- Language: Spanish

Mi querido capitán ("My Dear Captain") is a 1950 Mexican film. It stars Sara García.

== Cast ==
- Fernando Soler – Don Gastón Garza y Garza
- Sara García – Pelancha
- Rosita Quintana – Rosita
- Felipe de Alba – Fernando
- Agustín Isunza – Homero
- Jorge Reyes – Don Carlos
- Juan García – Octaviano
- Luis Badillo – Monchito, el yucateco
- Eugenia Galindo – Esposa de Guadalajara
- Nicolás Rodríguez – Don Julio
- Antonio Bravo – Esposo de Guadalajara
- Sonia Arriola –
- Bertha Lehar – Maruja, asistente de Rosita
- Guillermina Téllez Girón – Amiga de Monchito
- Lucila Davalos
- Gloria Mange
- Daniel Arroyo – Espectador teatro
- José Chávez – Joaquín
- Rosario García – Cándida
- Leonor Gómez – Estefana, sirvienta
- Consuelo Múgica – Invitada a fiesta
- Alicia Reyna – Esposa de Monchito
