= The Great Madcap =

- Film poster
- Spanish: El Gran Calavera
- Directed by: Luis Buñuel
- Written by: Janet Alcoriza; Luis Alcoriza
- Produced by: Óscar Dancigers; Fernando Soler
- Starring: Fernando Soler; Rosario Granados; Andrés Soler; Rubén Rojo; Gustavo Rojo
- Cinematography: Ezequiel Carrasco
- Edited by: Carlos Savage
- Music by: Manuel Esperón
- Distributed by: Ultramar Films
- Release date: 25 November 1949
- Running time: 91 minutes
- Country: Mexico
- Language: Spanish

El Gran Calavera (transl. The Great Madcap) is a 1949 Mexican comedy film directed by Luis Buñuel. The plot concerns a family patriarch who fakes losing all his wealth to end his family's self-indulgent ways.

== Plot ==
Everyone takes advantage of Ramiro de la Mata (Fernando Soler), a funny drunkard and rich widower. His daughter Virginia (Rosario Granados), and his son Eduardo (Gustavo Rojo), as well as his lazy brother Ladislao (Andrés Soler), and his sister-in-law Milagros (Maruja Grifell), all do nothing while living at Ramiro's expense. Gregorio (Francisco Jambrina), his other brother tries to help him by making everyone believe that Ramiro is financially ruined, forcing the family to look for jobs of their own.

== Cast ==
- Fernando Soler as Ramiro de la Mata
- Rosario Granados as Virginia
- Andrés Soler as Ladislao de la Mata
- Rubén Rojo as Pablo
- Gustavo Rojo as Eduardo de la Mata
- Maruja Grifell as Milagros
- Francisco Jambrina as Gregorio
- Luis Alcoriza as Alfredo
- Antonio Bravo as Alfonso
- Antonio Monsell as Juan, the butler
- María Luisa Serrano as Alfredo's mother

== Release ==
The Great Madcap was screened at the Luis Buñuel Film Institute on 22 July 2015.

== See also ==
- Nosotros los Nobles, a 2013 Mexican film that reuses the plot.
