= Mala hembra =

- Directed by: Miguel M. Delgado
- Written by: Janet Alcoriza, Luis Alcoriza
- Starring: Rosita Quintana, Ernesto Alonso, Rubén Rojo
- Cinematography: Víctor Herrera
- Edited by: Jorge Bustos
- Music by: Manuel Esperón
- Release date: 24 June 1950
- Running time: 85 minutes
- Country: Mexico
- Language: Spanish

Mala hembra ("Poor Female") is a 1950 Mexican film. It was written by Luis Alcoriza.

== Cast ==
- Rosita Quintana
- Ernesto Alonso
- Rubén Rojo
- José María Linares-Rivas
- Beatriz Aguirre
