= Flor de caña =

1948 film by Carlos Orellana

- Directed by: Carlos Orellana
- Written by: Luis Alcoriza; Janet Alcoriza
- Starring: María Antonieta Pons; Víctor Manuel Mendoza; Luis Alcoriza
- Cinematography: Alex Phillips
- Edited by: Gloria Schoemann
- Music by: Manuel Esperón
- Release date: 1948
- Country: Mexico
- Language: Spanish

Flor de caña ('Sugarcane Flower') is a 1948 Mexican film directed by Carlos Orellana. It was written by Luis Alcoriza.
