= Always Further On =

1965 film

- Directed by: Luis Alcoriza
- Written by: Luis Alcoriza
- Produced by: Antonio Matouk; Angélica Ortiz
- Starring: Ignacio López Tarso
- Cinematography: Rosalío Solano
- Edited by: Carlos Savage
- Release date: 9 September 1965
- Running time: 105 minutes
- Country: Mexico
- Languages: Spanish; Rarámuri

Always Further On (Spanish: Tarahumara (Cada vez más lejos)) is a 1965 Mexican drama film directed by Luis Alcoriza. It won the FIPRESCI Prize at the 1965 Cannes Film Festival. The film was also selected as the Mexican entry for the Best Foreign Language Film at the 38th Academy Awards, but was not accepted as a nominee.

== Cast ==
- Ignacio López Tarso
- Jaime Fernández
- Aurora Clavel
- Eric del Castillo
- Berta Castillón
- Pancho Córdova
- Regino Herrera

== See also ==
- List of submissions to the 38th Academy Awards for Best Foreign Language Film
- List of Mexican submissions for the Academy Award for Best Foreign Language Film
