= Si me viera don Porfirio =

- Written by: Luis Alcoriza
- Release date: 1950
- Country: Mexico
- Language: Spanish

Si me viera don Porfirio ("If Mr. Porfirio Could See Me") is a 1950 Mexican film. It was written by Luis Alcoriza.

== Cast ==
- Sara García ... Doña Martirio
- Ángel Garasa
- Domingo Soler
- Eduardo Noriega
- Esperanza Issa
- Silvia Derbez
- Ramón Gay
- Alfredo Varela ... (as Alfredo Varela 'Varelita')
- Queta Lavat
- José Pidal
- Dolores Camarillo ... (as Dolores Camarillo 'Fraustita')
- Miguel Manzano
- Pepe Nava
- Ramón Sánchez
- Rodolfo Castillo
