= El hombre de alazán =

- Written by: Luis Alcoriza
- Release date: 1959
- Running time: 89 minute
- Country: Mexico
- Language: Spanish

El hombre de alazán ("The Man of Chestnut") is a 1959 Mexican film. It was written by Luis Alcoriza.
