= Don't Be Offended Beatrice =

1953 film

- Spanish: No te ofendas, Beatriz
- Written by: Luis Alcoriza
- Release date: 1953
- Running time: 91 minute
- Country: Mexico
- Language: Spanish

Don't Be Offended Beatrice (Spanish:No te ofendas, Beatriz) is a 1953 Mexican film. It was written by Luis Alcoriza.

== Cast ==
- Alma Rosa Aguirre as Beatriz
- Abel Salazar as Javier de la Garza
- Manolo Fábregas as Mario
- Domingo Soler as Don Ramón
- Anabelle Gutiérrez as Margarita
