= The Black Bull (film) =

1959 film

- Written by: Luis Alcoriza
- Release date: 1959
- Running time: 85 minute
- Country: Mexico
- Language: Spanish

The Black Bull (Spanish: El toro negro) is a 1959 Mexican film. It was written by Luis Alcoriza.
