= El cariñoso =

1959 film

- Directed by: Rafael Baledón
- Written by: Luis Alcoriza
- Produced by: Gregorio Walerstein
- Starring: Miguel Aceves Mejía, Martha Mijares, Armando Arriola
- Cinematography: José Ortiz Ramos
- Edited by: Rafael Ceballos
- Music by: Gustavo César Carrión
- Release date: 5 May 1959
- Running time: 85 minutes
- Country: Mexico
- Language: Spanish

El cariñoso ("The Loving") is a 1959 Mexican film. It was written by Luis Alcoriza.
