= Consuelo Guerrero de Luna =

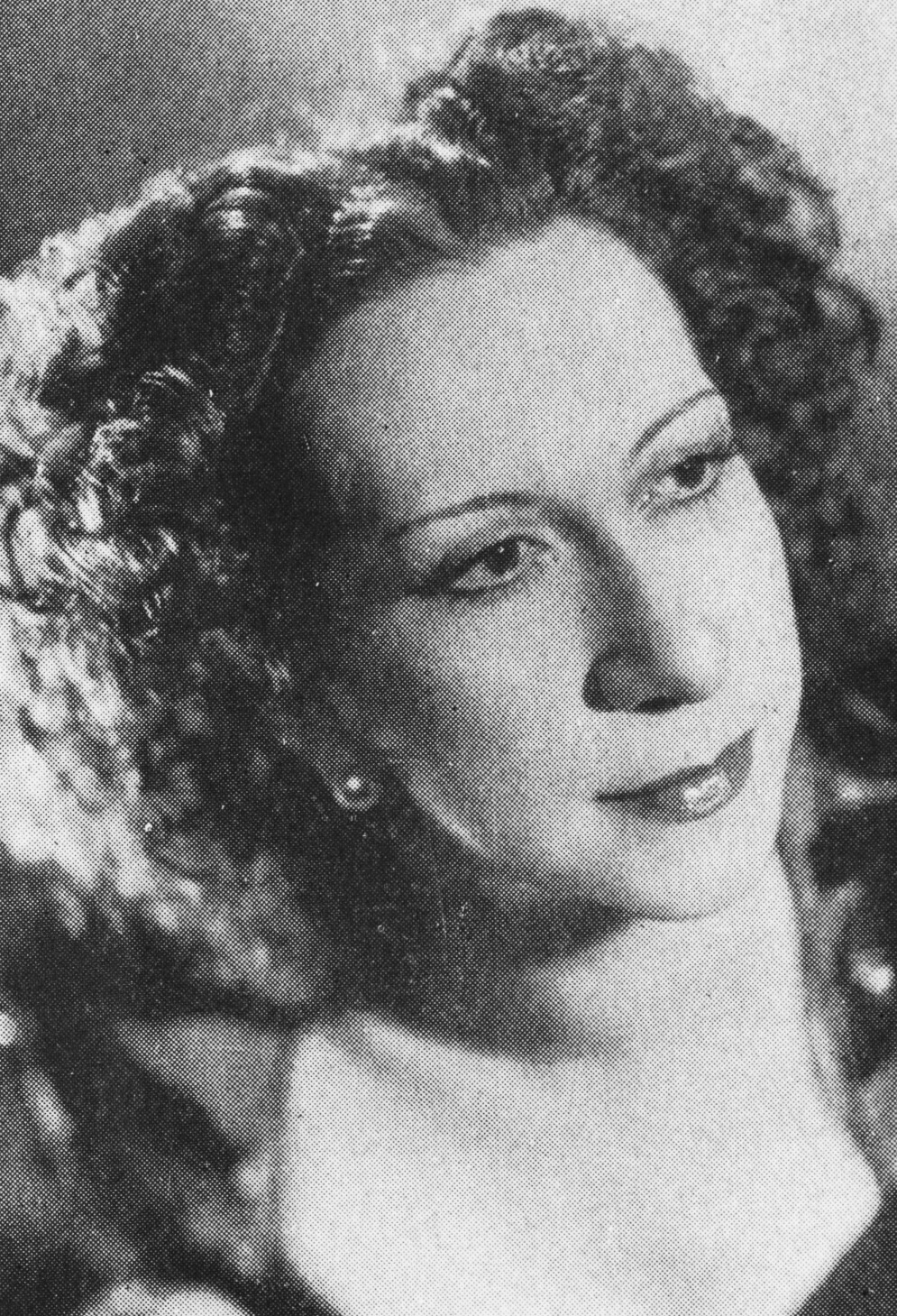
- Guerrero de Luna in 1945
- Born: 9 March 1905; Madrid, Spain
- Died: 11 October 1972 (aged 67); Mexico City, Mexico
- Occupation: Actress
- Years active: 1941 - 1961 (film)

Consuelo Guerrero de Luna (1905–1972) was a Spanish film actress who settled in Mexico. She appeared in more than fifty films including the 1945 historical film The White Monk.

== Selected filmography ==
- Oh, What Times, Don Simon! (1941)
- The Unknown Policeman (1941)
- When the Stars Travel (1942)
- I Danced with Don Porfirio (1942)
- Resurrection (1943)
- Summer Hotel (1944)
- The Daughter of the Regiment (1944)
- The Lieutenant Nun (1944)
- The White Monk (1945)
- Pepita Jiménez (1946)
- The Thief (1947)
- Spurs of Gold (1948)
- In the Palm of Your Hand (1951)
- Take Me in Your Arms (1954)
- Ash Wednesday (1958)

== Bibliography ==
- Paco Ignacio Taibo. María Félix: 47 pasos por el cine. Bruguera, 2008.
