= Antonio Bravo =

- Born: 1906; Madrid, Spain
- Died: February 28, 1992 (aged 85–86); Mexico City, Mexico
- Occupation: Actor
- Years active: 1938–1981 (film)

Antonio Bravo (12 May 1906 – 28 February 1992) was a Spanish-born Mexican film and television actor. He appeared in more than a hundred and forty productions during a lengthy career.

== Selected filmography ==
- Beautiful Mexico (1938)
- I'm a Real Mexican (1942)
- Les Misérables (1943)
- El Ametralladora (1943)
- Lightning in the South (1943)
- Cinco fueron escogidos (1943)
- The Escape (1944)
- Saint Francis of Assisi (1944)
- Pepita Jiménez (1946)
- Strange Appointment (1947)
- Madam Temptation (1948)
- The Great Madcap (1949)
- Philip of Jesus (1949)
- Mi querido capitán (1950)
- A Galician Dances the Mambo (1951)
- Los enredos de una gallega (1951)
- Northern Border (1953)
- The Strange Passenger (1953)
- The White Rose (1954)
- The Price of Living (1954)
- Take Me in Your Arms (1954)
- Drop the Curtain (1955)
- The King of Mexico (1956)
- A Few Drinks (1958)
- El Esqueleto de la señora Morales (1960)
- The Miracle Roses (1960)
- Love in the Shadows (1960)
- My Mother Is Guilty (1960)
- The Exterminating Angel (1962)
- The Holy Office (1974)
- La presidenta municipal (1975)

== Bibliography ==
- Rogelio Agrasánchez, Jr. Guillermo Calles: A Biography of the Actor and Mexican Cinema Pioneer. McFarland, 2010.
