= Luis Alcoriza =

Mexican screenwriter, film director and actor

- Born: September 5, 1918; Badajoz, Extremadura, Spain
- Died: December 3, 1992 (aged 74); Cuernavaca, Morelos, Mexico
- Years active: 1940–1989
- Spouse: Janet Alcoriza

Luis Alcoriza de la Vega (September 5, 1918 – December 3, 1992) was a Mexican screenwriter, film director, and actor.

Alcoriza was born in Spain and, exiled because of the Spanish Civil War, established himself in Mexico from 1940. His 1962 film Tlayucan was nominated for the Academy Award for Best Foreign Language Film. His 1987 film Life Is Most Important was entered into the 15th Moscow International Film Festival.

== Filmography ==
=== Screenwriter ===
- 1946 : El ahijado de la muerte
- 1947 : Una extraña mujer
- 1948 : Nocturno de amor
- 1948 : Enrédate y verás
- 1948 : Flor de caña
- 1949 : Negra consentida
- 1949 : Los amores de una viuda
- 1949 : El gran calavera
- 1949 : Un cuerpo de mujer
- 1950 : Tú, solo tú
- 1950 : La liga de las muchachas
- 1950 : Hipólito el de Santa
- 1950 : Mala hembra
- 1950 : Si me viera don Porfirio
- 1950 : Huellas del pasado
- 1950 : Los olvidados
- 1951 : La hija del engaño
- 1951 : Los enredos de una gallega
- 1951 : Canasta uruguaya
- 1951 : Anillo de compromiso
- 1952 : Hambre nuestra de cada día
- 1952 : Carne de presidio
- 1953 : El Bruto
- 1953 : No te ofendas, Beatriz
- 1953 : Él
- 1953 : The Island of Women
- 1954 : La ilusión viaja en tranvía
- 1954 : La visita que no tocó el timbre
- 1954 : Sombra verde
- 1955 : ...Y mañana serán mujeres
- 1955 : La vida no vale nada
- 1955 : El río y la muerte
- 1956 : The King of Mexico
- 1956 : El inocente
- 1956 : La muerte en este jardín
- 1957 : Morir de pie
- 1958 : A media luz los tres
- 1958 : Escuela de rateros
- 1959 : El cariñoso
- 1959 : El hombre de alazán
- 1959 : La Fièvre Monte à El Pao
- 1959 : El toro negro
- 1960 : Los jóvenes
- 1961 : Guantes de oro
- 1961 : ¡Suicídate, mi amor!
- 1962 : El ángel exterminador (L'Ange exterminateur)
- 1962 : Tlayucan
- 1963 : Tiburoneros
- 1963 : Safo'63
- 1965 : El gángster
- 1964 : Tarahumara (Cada vez más lejos) (Toujour plus loins)
- 1966 : Divertimento: Juego peligroso (Jôgo perigroso)
- 1968 : La puerta y La mujer del carnicero
- 1968 : Romeo contra Julieta
- 1969 : Persíguelas y alcanzalas
- 1970 : Pancho Tequila
- 1970 : El oficio más antiguo del mundo
- 1970 : Paraíso
- 1971 : La chamuscada
- 1972 : Mecánica nacional
- 1974 : El muro del silencio
- 1975 : Presagio
- 1975 : Las fuerzas vivas
- 1979 : En la trampa
- 1981 : Semana santa en Acapulco
- 1982 : Tac-tac (Han violado a una mujer)
- 1983 : El amor es un juego extraño
- 1987 : Lo que importa es vivir
- 1988 : Viacrucis nacional (Día de difuntos)
- 1990 : La sombra del ciprés es alargada
- 1994 : 7000 días juntos
- 1996 : Pesadilla para un rico

=== Director ===
- 1961 : Los jóvenes
- 1962 : Tlayucan
- 1963 : Tiburoneros
- 1964 : Amor y sexo
- 1965 : El gángster
- 1965 : Tarahumara (cada vez más lejos)
- 1967 : Juego peligroso
- 1968 : La puerta y la mujer del carnicero
- 1970 : El oficio más antiguo del mundo
- 1970 : Paraíso
- 1972 : Mecánica nacional
- 1974 : El muro del silencio
- 1974 : Fe, esperanza y caridad
- 1975 : Presagio
- 1975 : Las fuerzas vivas
- 1980 : A paso de cojo
- 1981 : Semana santa en Acapulco
- 1982 : Tac-tac
- 1983 : El amor es un juego extraño
- 1985 : Terror y encajes negros
- 1987 : Life Is Most Important
- 1988 : Día de muertos
- 1990 : La sombra del ciprés es alargada

=== Actor ===
- 1941 : La Torre de los suplicios
- 1942 : La Vírgen morena
- 1943 : Les Misérables
- 1943 : El rayo del sur
- 1944 : San Francisco de Asís
- 1944 : Nana : De Fauchery
- 1944 : Rosa de las nieves
- 1945 : Sierra Morena
- 1945 : El Capitán Malacara
- 1946 : María Magdalena: Pecadora de Magdala : Jesús Nazareno
- 1948 : Reina de reinas: La Virgen María : Jesús, el Nazareno
- 1948 : La casa de la Troya
- 1948 : Flor de caña
- 1949 : El gran calavera : Alfredo
- 1950 : Tú, solo tú
- 1950 : La Liga de las muchachas
