= Andrés Soler =

Argentinian actor (1898–1969)

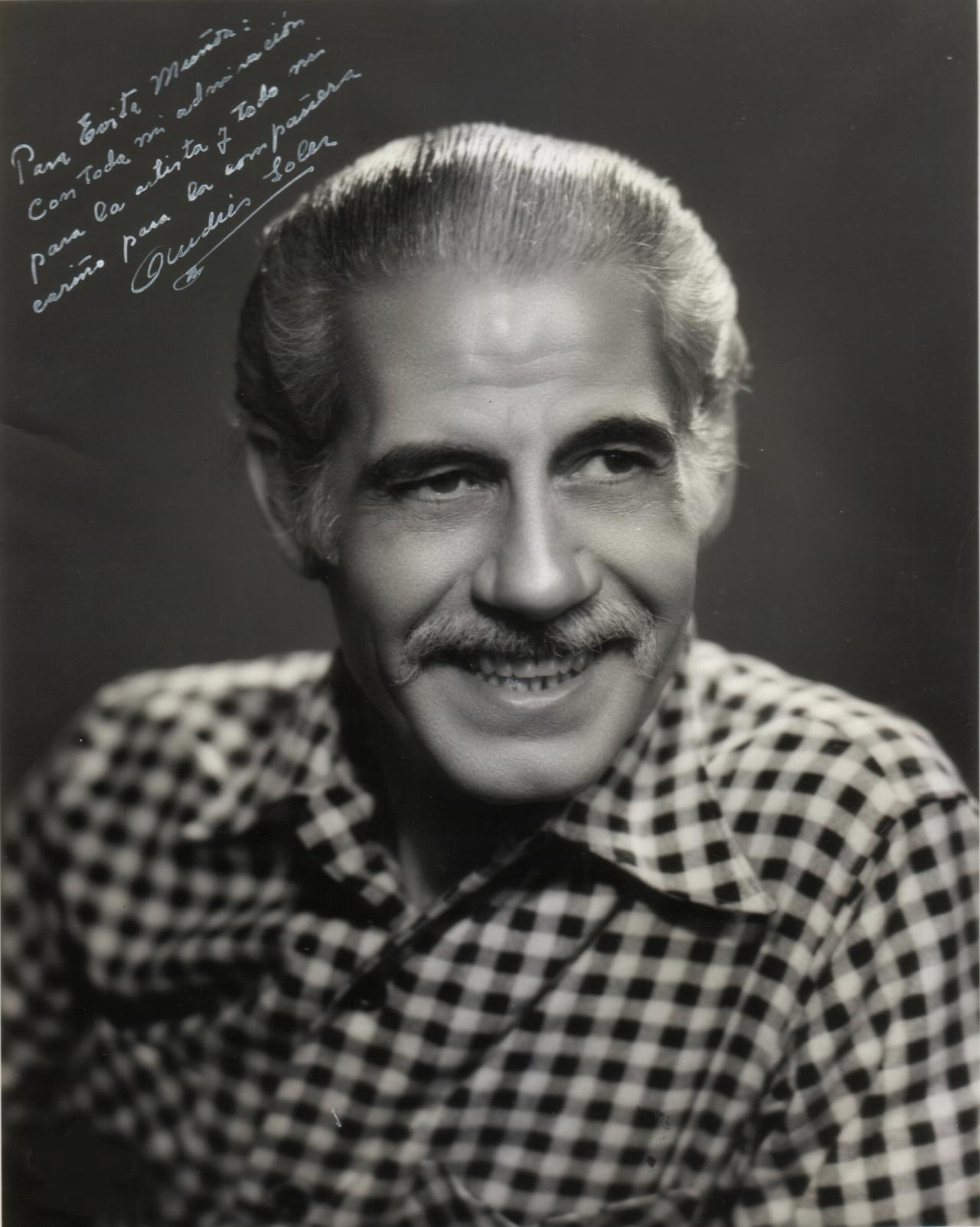
- Born: Andrés Díaz Pavia; 18 November 1898; Saltillo, Mexico
- Died: 26 July 1969 (aged 70); Mexico City, Mexico
- Resting place: Panteón Jardín
- Other name: Don Andrés Soler
- Occupation: Actor

Andrés Díaz Pavia (18 November 1898 – 26 July 1969), better known by the stage name Andrés Soler, was a Mexican actor. He was considered one of the greatest figures of the Golden Age of Mexican cinema. Soler appeared in about two hundred films and received four Ariel Award for Best Supporting Actor nominations in his long career.

== Early life ==
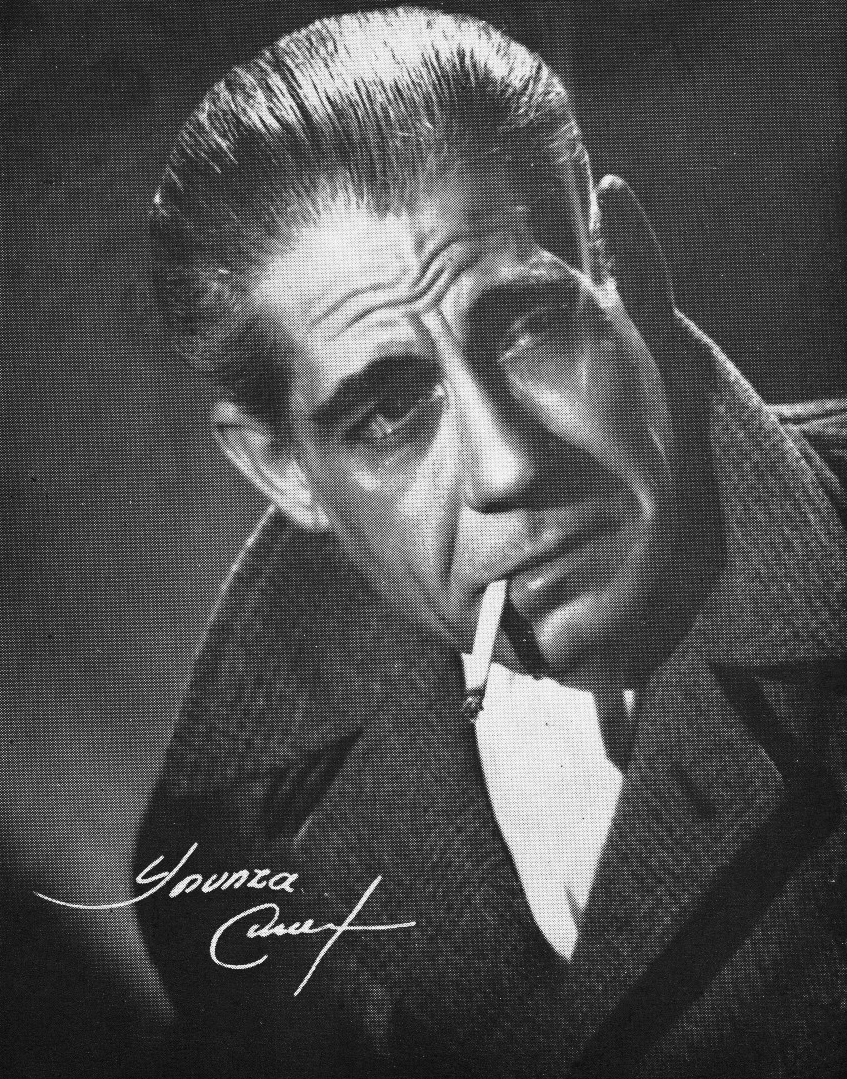
Andrés Soler in 1954

Andrés Soler was born in Saltillo, Coahuila as Andrés Díaz Pavía on 18 November 1898 to Domingo Díaz García, a Galician actor, and Irene Pavía Soler, a Valencian actress. His parents were Spanish theater actors who had come to Mexico with a theatrical company. He was the younger brother of Fernando Soler and the elder brother of Domingo Soler, Julián Soler, and Mercedes Soler. His family is known as the Soler Dynasty.

== Death ==
On 26 July 1969, Andrés Soler unexpectedly died at his residence in Mexico City at the age of 70. His cause of death was cerebral embolism.

Soler was interred at the Panteón Jardín in San Ángel. Thousands of people attended his funeral to say goodbye and offer their condolences. Katy Jurado, Luis Aguilar, Carmelita González, and Elsa Cárdenas were also present to memorize him.

== Selected filmography ==
- I'm a Real Mexican (1942)
- La razón de la culpa (1942)
- Doña Bárbara (1943)
- Five Were Chosen (1943)
- Romeo and Juliet (1943)
- Les Misérables (1943)
- Michael Strogoff (1944)
- Soul of Bronze (1944)
- A Day with the Devil (1945)
- The House of the Fox (1945)
- Fly Away, Young Man! (1947)
- Jalisco Fair (1948)
- The Shadow of the Bridge (1948)
- The Great Madcap (1949)
- The Black Sheep (1949)
- You Shall Not Covet Thy Son's Wife (1950)
- Over the Waves (1950)
- Between Your Love and Heaven (1950)
- Orange Blossom for Your Wedding (1950)
- Anacleto Gets Divorced (1950)
- Serenade in Acapulco (1951)
- Tenement House (1951)
- Doña Clarines (1951)
- Love Was Her Sin (1951)
- María Montecristo (1951)
- Sensuality (1951)
- Engagement Ring (1951)
- Women Without Tomorrow (1951)
- If I Were a Congressman (1952)
- A Place Near Heaven (1952)
- The Three Happy Compadres (1952)
- The Border Man (1952)
- Angélica (1952)
- Snow White (1952)
- The Bachelors (1953)
- The Sixth Race (1953)
- Sombrero (1953)
- The Rapture (1954)
- The Viscount of Monte Cristo (1954)
- Take Me in Your Arms (1954)
- When I Leave (1954)
- Look What Happened to Samson (1955)
- The Cha Cha Cha Widows (1955)
- The Hidden One (1956)
- The Adventures of Pito Pérez (1957)
- The Miracle Roses (1960)
- Juan Polainas (1960)
- The Two Apostles (1966)
