= Jaime Fernández (actor) =

Mexican actor and film director (1927-2005)

- Born: Nicolás Jaime Fernández Reyes; 6 December 1927; Monterrey, Nuevo León, Mexico
- Died: 11 April 2005 (aged 77); Mexico City, Mexico
- Occupations: Actor, film director
- Relatives: Emilio Fernández (cousin); Fernando Fernández (half-brother)

Nicolás Jaime Fernández Reyes (6 December 1927 - 15 April 2005) was a Mexican actor and film director. He was a star during the Golden Age of Mexican Cinema, winning three Ariel Awards, and served as the general secretary of the National Association of Actors (ANDA) for 11 years.

== Life and career ==
Fernández was born in Monterrey in 1927, the son of Fernando Fernández and Eloísa Reyes. His first cousin was actor/director Emilio Fernández, and his half-brother was actor Fernando Fernández. After working as a film sound technician, he got his first acting roles at the behest of his cousin.

Over his career, he won 3 Silver Ariel awards — the Mexican equivalent of the Oscar — including one for what is arguably his best-known role, playing Friday, the protagonist's associate in Luis Buñuel's Robinson Crusoe. He appeared in over 200 films and served as the general secretary of the National Association of Actors (ANDA) for 11 years. His tenure proved controversial, and lead to the splintering of the union into the rival Independent Actors Union (SAI).

Fernández died in Mexico City on April 15, 2005.

== Filmography ==
- 1948: Juan Charrasqueado ... Espectador pelea gallos (uncredited)
- 1949: La malquerida ... Marcial, hijo de Eusebio (uncredited)
- 1949: Allá en el Rancho Grande (uncredited)
- 1950: Un día de vida ... Teniente
- 1950: Duel in the Mountains ... Pueblerino (uncredited)
- 1951: Maria Islands ... Ricardo
- 1952: When Children Sin ... Fidel
- 1952: Soledad's Shawl ... Mauro
- 1952: Yo fui una callejera ... Vecino
- 1952: Carne de presidio ... Estudiante (uncredited)
- 1952: es:Mi campeón ... Espectador fútbol americano (uncredited)
- 1952: Viajera ... Estrada, estudiante (uncredited)
- 1952: El ceniciento ... Anunciador (uncredited)
- 1953: The Proud and the Beautiful
- 1953: Northern Border ... Jimmy
- 1953: Los solterones ... Pancho (uncredited)
- 1953: Ambiciosa
- 1953: El Bruto ... Julián García (uncredited)
- 1954: Sombra verde ... Bernabé
- 1954: La rebelión de los colgados ... Urbano
- 1954: Robinson Crusoe ... Friday
- 1954: The Rapture (uncredited)
- 1954: The Three Elenas ... Pablo
- 1954: The River and Death ... Rómulo Menchaca
- 1955: La venganza del Diablo (uncredited)
- 1955: El Túnel 6 ... Rafael
- 1955: El monstruo en la sombra
- 1955: Pecado mortal ... José María
- 1955: ...Y mañana serán mujeres
- 1956: Talpa ... Esteban
- 1956: Massacre ... Juan Pedro (as Jamie Fernandez)
- 1957: La cabeza de Pancho Villa ... Compadre Eduardo Jiménez
- 1957: La marca de Satanás
- 1957: El jinete sin cabeza ... Fernando
- 1957: Morir de pie ... Pablo del Villar
- 1957: Las manzanas de Dorotea ... Alberto
- 1958: El jinete negro ... Jonás Pantoja
- 1958: Bajo el cielo de México ... Felipe
- 1958: El jinete solitario en el valle de los buitres
- 1958: El Zorro escarlata en la venganza del ahorcado
- 1958: Zonga, el ángel diabólico
- 1958: Una cita de amor ... Román Chávez
- 1959: Sed de amor ... José
- 1959: El regreso del monstruo ... Don Esteban
- 1959: Besos de arena
- 1960: Northern Courier
- 1960: La ley de las pistolas
- 1960: Comedians and Songs ... El Charrascas
- 1960: La máscara de hierro ... Manuel Noriega López
- 1960: El impostor
- 1960: Vuelta al paraíso ... Felipe
- 1960: Herencia trágica ... Jonás Pantoja
- 1960: Calibre 44 ... Raúl
- 1960: The Miracle Roses ... Nanoaltzin
- 1960: Dos hijos desobedientes
- 1960: Una bala es mi testigo
- 1961: El jinete enmascarado
- 1961: Que me maten en tus brazos
- 1961: Escuela de valientes
- 1961: El hijo del charro negro ... Tiburcio González
- 1961: Bonitas las tapatías
- 1961: El Bronco Reynosa
- 1961: El padre Pistolas ... Gerencio Sánchez
- 1961: La máscara de la muerte
- 1961: Una pasión me domina ... Crescencio
- 1962: ...Qué hacer con mis hijos...
- 1962: Juramento de sangre
- 1962: Lástima de ropa
- 1962: El asaltacaminos
- 1962: Horizontes de sangre
- 1962: Camino de la horca ... Miguel
- 1962: Santo vs. las Mujeres Vampiro ... Inspector Carlos
- 1962: El muchacho de Durango ... Juan
- 1962: El Zorro vengador
- 1962: La trampa mortal ... Melquíades Sánchez
- 1962: El justiciero vengador ... Rómulo
- 1962: La venganza de la sombra ... Eduardo
- 1962: Santo Contra los Zombis ... Det. Rodríguez
- 1962: Cazadores de cabezas ... Roberto
- 1962: El ataúd infernal
- 1963: La sombra blanca
- 1963: Los Chacales
- 1963: El norteño
- 1963: Baila mi amor
- 1963: Así es mi México
- 1963: La huella macabra ... Inspector Portillo
- 1963: Tormenta en el ring
- 1963: Rutilo el forastero
- 1963: Rostro infernal ... Inspector Portillo
- 1963: La Muerte en el desfiladero
- 1963: El señor Tormenta
- 1963: Alias El Alacrán ... Juan
- 1964: Los fenómenos del futbol
- 1964: Canción del alma ... Ricardo
- 1964: El corrido de María Pistolas
- 1965: El hijo de Gabino Barrera ... Martín Contreras
- 1965: Always Further On
- 1965: Demonio azul
- 1965: Nido de águilas ... Capitán Ramírez
- 1965: Gabino Barrera
- 1966: A Bullet for the General ... General Elías
- 1966: El mexicano
- 1966: Hombres de roca
- 1966: El alazán y el rosillo ... Juventino Torres
- 1966: Blue Demon contra el poder satánico
- 1966: El caballo Bayo
- 1967: The Partisan of Villa ... Coronel Gutiérrez
- 1967: Damiana y los hombres
- 1967: Amanecí en tus brazos
- 1967: La soldadera ... Juan
- 1967: El forastero vengador
- 1967: Los hermanos Centella
- 1968: La sombra del murciélago
- 1968: Lucio Vázquez ... Emiliano Zapata
- 1968: No hay cruces en el mar ... Pedro
- 1968: Guns for San Sebastian ... 'Golden Lance'
- 1968: Day of the Evil Gun ... Addis' Indian scout (uncredited)
- 1968: Desnudarse y morir
- 1968: Caballo prieto azabache ... Rodolfo Fierro
- 1969: El último pistolero
- 1969: Romance sobre ruedas ... Jaime
- 1969: Lauro Puñales ... General Emiliano Zapata
- 1970: Emiliano Zapata ... Montaño
- 1970: El oficio más antiguo del mundo ... Teniente Julio Avila
- 1972: Ni solteros, ni casados
- 1974: Peregrina
- 1974: La muerte de Pancho Villa ... Melitón Lozaya
- 1976: The Bricklayers ... Pérez Gómez
- 1976: Longitud de guerra
- 1976: Chicano
- 1977: El mexicano
- 1977: El moro de Cumpas
- 1978: Los triunfadores
- 1979: Benjamín Argumedo el rebelde ... General carrancista
- 1979: La mafia de la frontera ... Layo
- 1979: Tierra sangrienta
- 1980: Persecución y muerte de Benjamín Argumedo ... General carrancista
- 1981: La cosecha de mujeres
- 1982: San Juan de Dios es Jalisco
- 1988: Mi fantasma y yo
- 1989: Al filo de la muerte ... El Pocho
- 1989: En los cuernos de la muerte
- 1990: El aduanal
- 1991: Bronco
- 1994: Juana la Cubana
- 1995: La fuga de los Pérez
- 1995: Llamada anónima
- 1995: Los cargadores
- 1995: Crimen en Chihuahua
- 1996: ¡Ay! Rateros no se rajen ... Comandante
- 1996: El gato de Chihuahua
- 1997: Crímenes del pasado ... Detective
- 1997: Los peluqueros ... Blas Anguiano
- 1998: El corrido de Santa Amalia
- 1998: Fuera de la ley
- 1999: El jardinero ... Adán Moreno
- 1999: Oficio mortal
- 2000: Cuenta saldada ... Rufino
- 2000: Noches violentas
- 2000: El jueves no matamos
- 2001: Muertes a medianoche ... Director Policía
- 2002: Pedro el quemado
- 2003: La guarecita de Michoacán
