= Meche Barba =

Mexican actress (1922–2000)

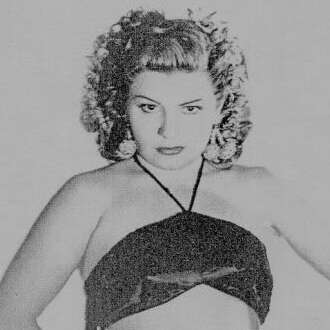
- Barba in 1948
- Born: Mercedes Barba Feito; September 24, 1922; New York City, U.S.
- Died: January 14, 2000 (aged 77); Mexico City, Mexico
- Occupations: Actress; dancer; singer
- Years active: 1937–1999

Meche Barba (born Mercedes Barba Feito; September 24, 1922 – January 14, 2000) was a Mexican film actress and dancer of the Golden age of Mexican cinema in the 1940s and 1950s. She was considered one of the icons of the "Rumberas film".

== Early life ==
Mercedes Barba Feito was born in New York City. She was born to Antonio Barba, a Spanish circus actor and a Mexican mother, Victoria Feito. The Barba family decided to go to Mexico to register her a citizen a few weeks after Meche's birth. She began her career in Mexico City's tent theaters at the age of six. Due to her father's illness, she started working at a young age, alongside her sister Carmen Barba, who by her beauty, was hired by entrepreneurs of the most famous tent theaters for various events.

== Career ==
Meche Barba began learning dance when the famous Mexican comedian Roberto "El Panzón" Soto gave her sister the opportunity to work in his stage company, and parents allowed Merche to accompany her sister to work there. Her parents enrolled her at the dance school of the Russian ballerina Nina Shestakova. Meche Barba both gained experience in tent theatres and took lessons from stars like Cantinflas, Manuel Medel, Joaquín Pardavé and several others. Later, Barba joined the Stage Company of Paco Miller, with artists like Amelia Wilhelmy and Germán Valdés, a.k.a. "Tin Tan".

After the success that she had in the company of Paco Miller, Meche Barba was hired as the second soprano in the musical show Rayando el sol in the Palacio de Bellas Artes. She also worked in theaters such as The Lírico, the Follies Berger and in Virginia Fábregas' theatre productions.

In one of her theatre presentations, producer Raúl de Anda saw her and hired her to act in the film Sota, caballo y rey (1944), which was Luis Aguilar's first starring role. In 1945 she began her participation in the Rumberas film Rosalinda, with the famous rumba dancer María Antonieta Pons. In 1946, Barba starred in the successful film Humo en los ojos. In 1947, she participated in the film Gran Casino, Luis Buñuel's first film in Mexico, together with Jorge Negrete and Libertad Lamarque. In the same year, she appeared with "Tin Tan" in the film Músico, poeta y loco. In 1948, she starred in Lola Casanova, the first film of the filmmaker Matilde Landeta.

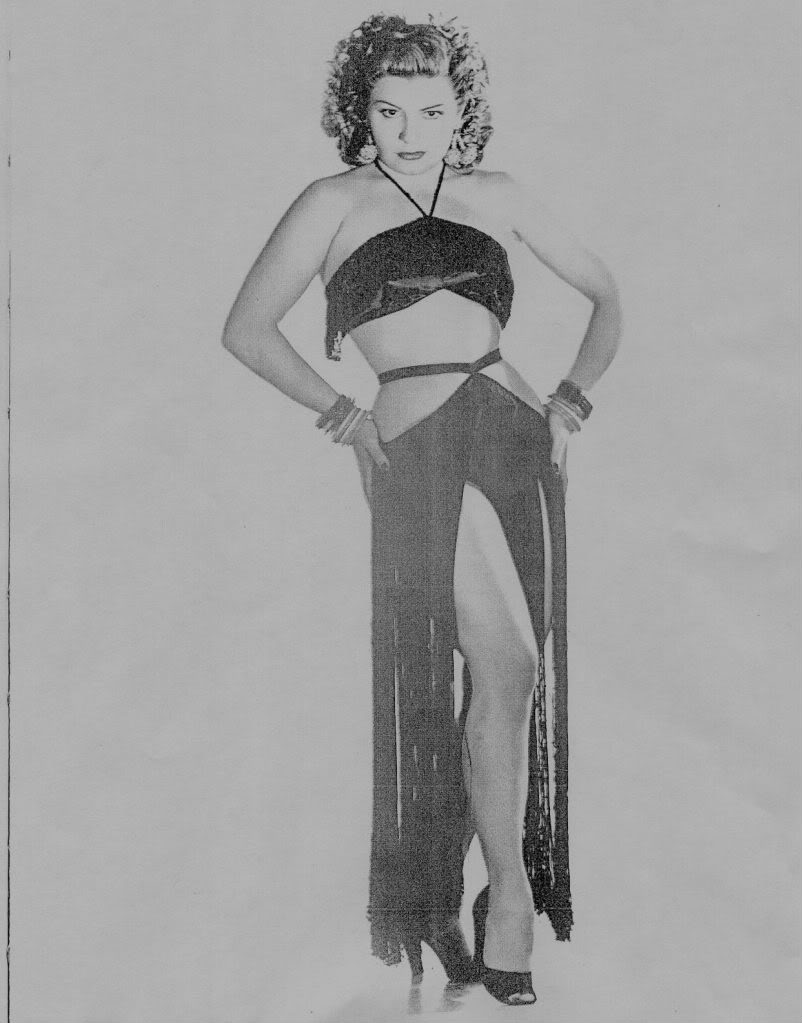
Barba in a promotional still for Cortesana (1948)

In 1949, in the film Venus de fuego, she began a series of collaborations with major film actor and singer Fernando Fernández. Together, they would act in a total of ten films, including Amor de la calle (1949), Una mujer con pasado (1949), Amor vendido (1950), Pasionaria (1951), When Children Sin (1952) and Ambiciosa (1953). In other films, she co-starred with such actors as Manolo Fabregas (Dancing: salón de baile), Carlos López Moctezuma (La mujer desnuda), Silvia Pinal (El pecado de Laura), Sara Garcia (Eterna agonía) and Jorge Mistral (La muerte es mi pareja), among others. Following her participation in the film As negro in 1954, Barba retired from filmmaking, and remained away for several decades. She returned to film in 1992 with Los años de Greta, for which she received her first Silver Ariel Award for Best Supporting Actress.

In 1984, telenovelas writer Carlos Romero convinced her to return to television. She participated in the 1980s and 1990s in several telenovelas, most notably María Mercedes (1992) and María la del barrio (1995), with the Mexican actress and singer Thalía.

== Personal life and death ==
In the film sets, Meche Barba met the famous Mexican actor and singer Fernando Fernández, known as The Mexican Crooner. They had a love affair that brought conflict between Fernandez and his wife, the singer Lupita Palomera. From her relationship with Fernandez, Barba had her only son, Fernando Fernández Barba.

Meche Barba died in Mexico City on January 14, 2000, following a heart attack.

== Filmography ==
- Ave sin Rumbo (1937)
- Sota, Caballo y Rey (1944)
- Rancho de mis recuerdos (1945)
- El hijo de nadie (1944)
- Madman and Vagabond (1946)
- Rosalinda (1946)
- Humo en los ojos (1946)
- Gran Casino (1947)
- Felipe Was Unfortunate (1947)
- Musico, poeta y loco (1947)
- Courtesan (1948)
- Lazos de fuego (1948)
- Lola Casanova (1949)
- Negra Consentida (1949)
- El pecado de Laura (1949)
- Venus de fuego (1949)
- Eterna agonía (1949)
- Cuando el alba llegue (1949)
- Una mujer con pasado (1950)
- Amor de la calle (1950)
- If I Were Just Anyone (1950)
- Tenement House (1951)
- Love for Sale (1951)
- Cuando tu me quieras (1951)
- Get Your Sandwiches Here (1951)
- Passionflower (1951)
- Dancing: salón de baile (1951)
- La muerte es mi pareja (1951)
- Yo fuí una callejera (1950)
- When Children Sin (1952)
- Mi papá tuvo la culpa (1952)
- The Naked Woman (1953)
- I Want to Live (1953)
- Reportaje (1953)
- Ambiciosa (1953) (1953)
- Black Ace (1954)
- Amor y venganza (1991)
- Los Años de Greta (1992)

=== TV ===
- Principessa (1984)
- La pobre Señorita Limantour (1986)
- Quinceañera (1987)
- Rosa salvaje (1987)
- Balada por un amor (1990)
- María Mercedes (1992)
- Sueño de amor (1993)
- Valentina (1993)
- Marimar (1994)
- María la del Barrio (1995)
- La Usurpadora (1998)
- Rosalinda (1999)

== Bibliography ==
- Muñoz Castillo., Fernando (1993). Las Reinas del Tropico: María Antonieta Pons, Meche Barba, Amalia Aguilar, Ninón Sevilla & Rosa Carmina. Grupo Azabache. ISBN 968-6084-85-1.
- Las Rumberas del Cine Mexicano (The Rumberas of the Mexican Cinema) (1999). In SOMOS. México: Editorial Televisa, S. A. de C. V.
- Agrasánchez Jr., Rogelio (2001). Bellezas del cine mexicano/Beauties of Mexican Cinema. Archivo Fílmico Agrasánchez. ISBN 968-5077-11-8.
