= Mi campeón =

1952 film by Chano Urueta

- Directed by: Chano Urueta
- Written by: Joaquín Pardavé
- Story by: Leopoldo Baeza y Aceves
- Produced by: Gregorio Walerstein
- Starring: Niní Marshall; Joaquín Pardavé; Fernando Fernández
- Cinematography: Agustín Martínez Solares
- Edited by: Rafael Ceballos
- Music by: Sergio Guerrero
- Release date: 20 June 1952
- Running time: 114 minutes
- Country: Mexico
- Language: Spanish

Mi campeón (English: My Champion) is a 1952 Mexican film directed by Chano Urueta and starring Niní Marshall, Joaquín Pardavé, Beatriz Aguirre, Fernando Fernández, Miguel Arenas and Libertad Lamarque.

The film was released on 20 June 1952 at the Cine Palacio Chino cinema, where it was shown for two weeks.

== Cast ==
- Niní Marshall ... doña Lupe; cándida (as Nini Marshal)
- Joaquín Pardavé ... Choforito Moreno
- Fernando Fernández ... Luis
- Rosita Arenas ... Rosita
- Beatriz Aguirre ... Rosa Morfín Valenzuela
- Miguel Arenas ... Ramiro
- Pepe del Río ... Nacho (as José del Río)
- Pompín Iglesias
- Wolf Ruvinskis ... Pablo Rivas (as Wolf Rubinski)
- Libertad Lamarque
- Germán Valdés ... Tin Tan (as Tin-Tan)
- Marcelo Chávez ... Marcelo (as Marcelo)
- Agustín Lara ... Agustín
- Gloria Mestre ... Dancer
- Lina Salomé ... Dancer
