= Musical Romance =

Musical Romance may refer to:

- Musical Romance (1941 film), a 1941 Cuban film
- Musical Romance (1947 film), a 1947 Argentine musical comedy film
- Musical Romance (horse), winner of the 2011 Breeders' Cup
- Musical romance, a genre
