= A Dangerous Adventure =

A Dangerous Adventure may refer to:

- A Dangerous Adventure (serial), a Warner Bros. film serial
- A Dangerous Adventure (1937 film), an American film
- A Dangerous Adventure (1939 film), a Cuban film
