= Mexican Bus Ride =

1952 film by Luis Buñuel

- Film poster
- Spanish: Subida al cielo
- Directed by: Luis Buñuel
- Written by: Manuel Altolaguirre; Luis Buñuel
- Produced by: Manuel Altolaguirre; María Luisa Gómez Mena
- Starring: Lilia Prado
- Cinematography: Alex Phillips
- Edited by: Rafael Portillo
- Music by: Gustavo Pittaluga
- Release date: 26 June 1952
- Running time: 84 minutes
- Country: Mexico
- Language: Spanish

Mexican Bus Ride (original title in Spanish: Subida al cielo, "Ascent to Heaven") is a 1952 Mexican comedy film directed by Luis Buñuel and starring Lilia Prado. It was entered into the 1952 Cannes Film Festival.

== Plot ==
In much the same way that the film Illusion Travels by Streetcar, directed by Buñuel two years later, focuses on a tram ride, this film is essentially about a bus ride.

When Oliverio's mother is dying, she wants to quickly write a will so that the youngest son gets his share and the two older brothers don't collect everything. Because his mother is too weak to travel, Oliverio is supposed to bring a notary from the city to her. So he takes the bus, but unforeseen events constantly interrupt the journey. These interruptions affect all aspects of life; a birth as well as a funeral, and a breakdown when the bus hits a river. The most pleasant companion for Oliverio on this journey is the seductive Raquel. In the end, Oliverio returns to his mother, who has died in the meantime, without the notary, but he can still secure his share of the inheritance by means of a fingerprint under the will she wants.

== Cast ==
- Lilia Prado as Raquel
- Esteban Márquez as Oliverio Grajales
- Luis Aceves Castañeda as Silvestre
- Manuel Dondé as Eladio Gonzales
- Roberto Cobo as Juan
- Beatriz Ramos as Elisa
- Manuel Noriega
- Roberto Meyer as Don Nemesio Álvarez y Villalbazo
- Pedro Elviro
- Leonor Gómez as Doña Linda

== Reception ==
Ed Gonzalez of Slant Magazine called Mexican Bus Ride "a beautiful, spiritual film, albeit a messy one."

== Accolades ==
Mexican Bus Ride was nominated for two Ariel Awards in Best Direction and Best Original Story, respectively. The film was also nominated for the Golden Ariel.
