= Passionflower (1952 film) =

1952 film

- Directed by: Joaquín Pardavé
- Written by: Joaquín Pardavé; Pedro de Urdimalas
- Produced by: Luis Manrique
- Starring: Meche Barba; Fernando Fernández; Freddy Fernández
- Cinematography: Manuel Gómez Urquiza
- Edited by: Juan José Marino
- Music by: Sergio Guerrero
- Distributed by: Clasa-Mohme
- Release date: 9 April 1952
- Running time: 100 minutes
- Country: Mexico
- Language: Spanish

Passionflower (Spanish: Pasionaria) is a 1952 Mexican crime drama film directed by Joaquín Pardavé and starring Meche Barba, Fernando Fernández and Freddy Fernández. It was shot at the Churubusco Studios in Mexico City. The film's sets were designed by the art director Jorge Fernández.

== Cast ==
- Meche Barba as Lupita
- Fernando Fernández as Ricardo
- Freddy Fernández as El Pichi
- Roberto G. Rivera as Jorge
- Manuel Hernández as Manolo Hernández
- Carlos Múzquiz as Don Luis
- Pascual García Peña as Pascual
- Rafael Icardo as Don Rodrigo
- Manuel Dondé as Prisionero
- Rafael Banquells as Juan
- José René Ruiz as Medio litro
- Isaac Norton as Cabezas
- Pablo Marichal as Charolito
- José Chávez as Policía
- Javier de la Parra as Agente policía
- Agustín Fernández as Alma negra
- Rogelio Fernández as Criado
- Sara Guasch as Doña Rosa, madre de Ricardo
- José Muñoz as Bernardo

== Bibliography ==
- Hershfield, Joanne; Maciel, David (1999). Mexico's Cinema: A Century of Film and Filmmakers. Scholarly Resources. ISBN 9780842026819.
