= Vacations in Acapulco =

1961 Mexican comedy film directed by Fernando Cortés

- Directed by: Fernando Cortés
- Written by: Fernando Cortés; José María Fernández Unsáin; Alfredo Varela
- Produced by: Alfredo Ripstein hijo César Santos Galindo
- Starring: Antonio Aguilar; Ariadna Welter; Fernando Casanova; Rafael Bertrand; Sonia Furió; Mapita Cortés; Alfonso Mejía; Fernando Luján; Martha Elena Cervantes
- Cinematography: José Ortiz Ramos
- Edited by: Alfredo Rosas Priego
- Music by: Gustavo César Carrión
- Production company: Alameda Films
- Distributed by: Alameda Films
- Release date: 2 March 1961
- Running time: 95 minutes
- Country: Mexico
- Language: Spanish

Vacations in Acapulco (Spanish: Vacaciones en Acapulco) is a 1961 Mexican comedy film written and directed by Fernando Cortés, and starring Antonio Aguilar, Ariadna Welter, Fernando Casanova, Rafael Bertrand, Sonia Furió, Mapita Cortés, Alfonso Mejía, Fernando Luján and Martha Elena Cervantes.

The film's sets were designed by the art director Roberto Silva. It was shot in Eastmancolor.

== Cast ==
- Antonio Aguilar as Antonio Aguilar
- Ariadna Welter as Diana
- Fernando Casanova as Enrique
- Sonia Furió as Marga del Valle
- Rafael Bertrand as Mario Martínez
- Mapita Cortés as Ana María
- Alfonso Mejía as Lencho
- Fernando Luján as Pepe
- Óscar Ortiz de Pinedo as don Joaquín Gómez
- Polo Ortín as Recien casado
- Antonio Raxel as Tío James
- Guillermo Hernández as Chofer de camión
- Roxana Bellini as Roxana
- Florencio Castelló as Don Venancio
- Consuelo Monteagudo as Esposa de Venancio
- Jorge Alzaga as Gerente de hotel
- Bucky Gutierrez as Maestra de modelos
- Martha Elena Cervantes as Recien casada
- Pedro de Aguillón as Pápa de niños
- Antonio Prieto as Antonio Prieto
- Rosina Navarro as Cantante
- Socorro Navarro as Cantante
- Elisa Asperó as Elisa, asistente de Marga
- Antonio Brillas as Detective
- Rafael Estrada as Locutor
- Mario García 'Harapos' as Mesero
- Emilio Gálvez as Cantante
- Jesús Gómez as Policía
- Martha Lipuzcoa
- Francisco Meneses as Policía
- Consuelo Oviedo as Chelo Oviedo
- Guillermo Álvarez Bianchi as Gordo

== Bibliography ==
- Emilio García Riera. Historia documental del cine mexicano: 1958. Ediciones Era, 1975.
