= Love Street =

Love Street may refer to:

- Love Street (song), a 1968 song by the Doors
- Love Street (stadium), a football stadium on Love Street in Paisley, Scotland
- Amor de la calle (Love Street), a 1950 Mexican drama film
- Love Street, a song by R. Kelly, from the album Happy People/U Saved Me
