= Marilú (singer) =

Mexican singer and actress (1927–2023)

Background information
- Birth name: Marina Herrera Aragón
- Also known as: "La Muñequita que Canta"
- Born: 18 July 1927; Cárdenas, San Luis Potosí, Mexico
- Died: 16 February 2023 (aged 95)
- Genres: Bolero
- Occupation(s): Singer, actress
- Instrument: Vocals
- Years active: 1939–20??
- Labels: Peerless; RCA Victor

Marina Herrera Aragón (18 July 1927 – 16 February 2023), known as Marilú or "La Muñequita que Canta" (The Little Doll that Sings), was a Mexican singer and actress. She began her career in 1939. At the time of her death she was one of the last stars from the Golden Age of Mexican cinema.

== Background ==
Marilú was born in Cárdenas, San Luis Potosí, Mexico. After her father's death, the family moved to Tampico, Tamaulipas, where Marilú won a singing contest and joined the troupe of a comedian named Don Catarino. In November 1940 she joined Paco Miller's troupe, which later toured Mexican states.

In Mexico City, Marilú became an XEW radio performer and appeared in her first film, La liga de las canciones (1941). She also sang at the Teatro Lírico and the Teatro Follies. In 1943, she sang at the Waikiki nightclub and joined Alfonso Brito's troupe at the Carpa Colonial.

== Career ==
After signing a contract with Filmex (a production company), she studied drama with Gustavo Villatoro and co-starred with actor and director Joaquín Pardavé in three of his films: Los hijos de Don Venancio (1944), Los nietos de Don Venancio (1946), and El barchante Neguib (1946).

In 1952, she signed a recording contract with Peerless Records and released her first hit single, "Veleidad". Her other Peerless recordings include "Inquietud", "Consentida", and a Spanish version of "Hi-Lili, Hi-Lo" (from the film Lili). In 1958 she recorded Noche de luna, an album of Gonzalo Curiel songs, for RCA Victor's Vik label. In the 1970s she recorded two albums, Tangos de Buenos Aires and Marilú hoy. Her most recent albums are Cuidado muy sentimental and Recordando a Daniel Zarabozo.

== Personal life and death ==
Marilú was the wife of cartoonist David Carrillo, founder of the Mexican Society of Cartoonists, until his death in 2015. In 2016, she said: "My life is singing and I will continue doing it until the public allows me, [because] when they no longer accept me for sure I will cry, and I will have to retire, but as long as that does not happen I will continue, because I still have faculties."

Marilú died on 16 February 2023, at the age of 95.
