= Magdalena (film) =

- Directed by: Joaquín Pardavé
- Written by: Ramón Obón; José de Jesús Vizcaino; Joaquín Pardavé
- Produced by: Antonio del Castillo
- Starring: Rosario Granados; Fernando Fernández; Rodolfo LandaKrüger
- Cinematography: Enrique Wallace
- Edited by: Rafael Ceballos
- Music by: Sergio Guerrero
- Production company: Filmex
- Release date: 15 April 1955
- Running time: 91 minutes
- Country: Mexico
- Language: Spanish

Magdalena is a 1955 Mexican drama film directed by Joaquín Pardavé and starring Rosario Granados, Fernando Fernández and Rodolfo Landa.

== Cast ==
- Rosario Granados as Magdalena Antúnez
- Fernando Fernández as Luis
- Rodolfo Landa as Ernesto
- Martha Valdés as Lucila
- Anita Blanch as Tía Concha
- Arturo Soto Rangel as Maestro de música
- Tito Novaro as Eduardo
- Elsa Cárdenas as Elenita
- Roberto G. Rivera as Rodrigo
- Ernesto Finance as Lic. Arturo Aguilar
- José Pidal as Doctor
- León Barroso as Doctor II
- Aurora Zermeño as Enriqueta, assistante de Magdalena

== Bibliography ==
- Emilio García Riera. Historia documental del cine mexicano: 1953-1954. Universidad de Guadalajara, 1997.
