= Cuando los hijos pecan =

- Directed by: Joselito Rodríguez
- Written by: Mauricio Magdaleno (story); Carlos Orellana
- Produced by: Luis Manrique
- Starring: Meche Barba; Silvia Pinal; Jaime Fernández; Rafael Banquells; Fernando Fernández
- Cinematography: Ignacio Torres
- Edited by: Juan José Marino
- Music by: Sergio Guerrero
- Release date: 20 November 1952
- Running time: 100 minutes
- Country: Mexico
- Language: Spanish

Cuando los hijos pecan (When Children Sin) also known as Cabaretera (Cabaret Woman) is a 1952 Mexican film. It was directed by Joselito Rodríguez and starring Meche Barba and Silvia Pinal.

== Plot ==
Don Evaristo (Carlos Orellana), is a widower with two daughters Aurora (Meche Barba) and Tencha (Silvia Pinal). Aurora is a dancer and cabaret star, while Tencha suffers a limp. The assistant of Don Evaristo, Fidel (Jaime Fernández), is in love with Aurora, and suffers the contempt of the frivolous woman who works in the cabaret where she works and ends up involving herself with a gangster. Meanwhile, Tencha secretly loves Fidel. The virtue of Tencha is rewarded in an unexpected way.

== Cast ==
- Meche Barba ... Aurora
- Silvia Pinal ... Tencha
- Jaime Fernández ... Fidel
- Carlos Orellana ... Don Evaristo
- Rafael Banquells ... Gonzalo
- María Victoria ... Olga
- José Pulido ... Ramón
- Fanny Schiller ... Doña Elena
- Dolores Camarillo ... Felipa
- Fernando Fernández ... Fernando
- Freddy Fernández ... El Pichi

== Review ==
In this film, the Mexican rumbera Meche Barba shares credit with the young star of the moment, Silvia Pinal, who plays her younger sister in this melodramatic tale. Meche was known for her way of dancing in imaginary scenarios in Mexican cinema. This is the second film that Barba and Pinal shared credit (the first time was in the film The Sin of Laura (1949), one of the Pinal's first movies).
