= Raffles (1958 film) =

- Directed by: Alejandro Galindo
- Written by: Alejandro Galindo
- Based on: The Amateur Cracksman; 1899 novel by E. W. Hornung Eugene Wiley Presbrey (1906 play)
- Produced by: Alfredo Ripstein hijo César Santos Galindo
- Starring: Rafael Bertrand; María Duval; Prudencia Grifell
- Cinematography: Raúl Martínez Solares
- Edited by: Charles L. Kimball
- Music by: Gustavo César Carrión
- Production company: Alameda Films
- Distributed by: Alameda Films
- Release date: 10 October 1958
- Country: Mexico
- Language: Spanish

Raffles (Spanish: Raffles mexicano) is a 1958 Mexican crime film directed by Alejandro Galindo and starring Rafael Bertrand, María Duval and Prudencia Grifell. The film is based on E.W. Hornung books about the British gentleman thief A.J. Raffles, who is portrayed here as a Mexican. The film appears to be lost.

The film's sets were designed by the art director Gunther Gerszo.

== Cast ==
- Pepe Alameda
- Miguel Arenas
- León Barroso
- José Baviera
- Rafael Bertrand as Roberto 'Rafles'
- Quintín Bulnes
- Alfonso Carti
- Víctor Manuel Castro
- Mario Cid
- Manuel Dondé
- María Duval as Señorita Espíndola
- Prudencia Grifell as Doña Constancia
- Arturo Martínez as Comandante
- Roberto Meyer
- Martha Mijares as Alicia
- Mario Sevilla
- Manuel Trejo Morales
- Jorge Trevino

== Bibliography ==
- Hardy, Phil. The BFI Companion to Crime. A&C Black, 1997.
