= El barchante Neguib =

- Directed by: Joaquín Pardavé
- Written by: Joaquin Pardave, Carlos Orellana, Ramiro Gomez
- Produced by: Gregorio Wallerstein
- Starring: Joaquín Pardavé, Sara García and Jorge Ancira
- Cinematography: Jose Ortiz Ramos
- Music by: Federico Ruiz and Rosalio Ramirez
- Release date: 13 September 1946
- Running time: 90 minutes
- Country: Mexico
- Language: Spanish

El barchante Neguib is a 1946 Mexican film. It stars Joaquín Pardavé as "Neguib" and Sara García as "Sara".

The film revolves around a Lebanese Mexican family that heads to Mexico City to visit their son, Alfredo (Jorge Ancira). The son, shameful of their family's Arab origin, does not welcome them into his home. Therefore, the father Neguib (Joaquín Pardavé) sets up a clothing store in a market, competing with their neighbor Regina (Dolores Camarillo), whom he incidentally calls "Rajona" (Spanish for someone who gives up easily). The family also consists of the wife Sara (Sara García), daughters Natalia (Olga Jiménez) and Rebeca (Marina Herrera "Marilú"), and the family's rural manservant Piloncillo (Fernando Soto), also known to the family as "Baloncillo".
