= The Night of the Mayas =

1939 film by Chano Urueta

- Directed by: Chano Urueta
- Written by: Archibaldo Burns; Alfredo B. Crevenna; Antonio Mediz Bolio; Chano Urueta
- Produced by: Francisco Cabrera; Mauricio de la Serna
- Starring: Arturo de Córdova; Stella Inda; Isabela Corona
- Cinematography: Gabriel Figueroa
- Edited by: Emilio Gómez Muriel
- Music by: Silvestre Revueltas, with Mayan tunes contributed by Cornelio Cárdenas Samada
- Distributed by: Fama Films
- Release date: 1939
- Running time: 101 minutes
- Country: Mexico
- Language: Spanish

The Night of the Mayas (Spanish: La noche de los mayas) is a 1939 Mexican film directed by Chano Urueta. The film, which is called a "Mexican tragedy" set in the times of the Mayas, is remembered today for its musical score by the Mexican composer Silvestre Revueltas.

== Cast ==
- Arturo de Córdova as Uz
- Stella Inda as Lol
- Isabela Corona as Zev
- Luis Aldás as Miguel
- Miguel Ángel Ferriz Sr. as Yum Balam
- Rodolfo Landa as Taz
- Daniel (Chino) Herrera as Apolonio
- Rosita Gasque as Pil
- Max Langler as H‐Men, hombre sabio
- Jacoba Herrera as Nuc, anciana
- Ch. Sánchez as Chumín

== Music ==
Revueltas' music is best known in arrangements for the concert hall, although the composer did not live to make such an arrangement himself.

=== Concert suites ===
In 1946 the German composer Paul Hindemith made a visit to Mexico where he met Rosaura Revueltas, sister of Silvestre. This led to his concert arrangement in two movements.

There is a later arrangement by José Limantour (1919–1976) in four movements. It is scored for larger forces than Hindemith's version and includes a large percussion section.

=== Recordings ===
The version by Hindemith was recorded by the Tempus Fugit Orquesta conducted by Christian Gohmer, and released by Quindecim Records in 2014.

Limantour was recorded conducting the Orquesta Sinfónica de Guadalajara. Later recordings include one by the Orquesta Sinfónica Simón Bolívar, conducted by Gustavo Dudamel, which was released on Deutsche Grammophon in 2010.
