= The Perez Family (1949 film) =

- Directed by: Gilberto Martínez Solares
- Written by: Joaquín Pardavé; Gilberto Martínez Solares
- Produced by: Gregorio Walerstein
- Starring: Joaquín Pardavé; Sara García; Beatriz Aguirre; Alma Rosa Aguirre; Lilia Prado
- Cinematography: Agustín Martínez Solares
- Edited by: Mario González
- Music by: Manuel Esperón
- Production company: Filmex
- Release date: 5 May 1949
- Running time: 93 minutes
- Country: Mexico
- Language: Spanish

The Perez Family (Spanish: La familia Pérez) is a 1949 Mexican comedy drama film written and directed by Gilberto Martínez Solares, and starring Joaquín Pardavé, Sara García, Beatriz Aguirre, Alma Rosa Aguirre and Lilia Prado. This film could have been inspired by Jane Austen's novel Pride and Prejudice.

== Cast ==
- Joaquín Pardavé - Gumaro Pérez
- Sara García - Natalia Vivanco de Pérez
- Manuel Fábregas - Luis Robles del Valle
- Beatriz Aguirre - Clara
- José Elías Moreno - Toribio Sánchez
- Alma Rosa Aguirre - Patricia
- Lilia Prado - Rosa
- Felipe de Alba - Roberto Martínez
- Conchita Carracedo - Margarita
- José Baviera- Don Ricardo
- Ana María Villaseñor - Irene
- Óscar Pulido - Raymundo
- Celia Duarte - Petra
- Isaac Norton - Ramón
- Eduardo Noriega - Felipe Barrera y Arévalo
- José Ángel Espinosa 'Ferrusquilla' - Narrator
- Jorge Fábregas - (uncredited)
- Gloria Lozano - Empleada en oficina (uncredited)
- Paco Martínez - Invitado a boda (uncredited)
- Carlos Múzquiz - Rodríguez (uncredited)
- Manuel Trejo - (uncredited)
- Hernán Vera - Movedor (uncredited)
- Oscar Villela - (uncredited)
