= If I Were Just Anyone =

- Directed by: Ernesto Cortázar
- Written by: Ernesto Cortázar; Jaime Contreras
- Produced by: Luis Manrique
- Starring: Meche Barba; Fernando Fernández; Lilia Prado; Freddy Fernández "El Pichi"
- Cinematography: Víctor Herrera
- Music by: Manuel Esperón; Los Panchos; Francisco Avitia
- Release date: May 31, 1950 (México)
- Running time: 100 minutes
- Country: Mexico
- Language: Spanish

If I Were Just Anyone (Spanish: Si fuera una cualquiera) is a 1950 Mexican drama film directed by Ernesto Cortázar and starring Meche Barba and Fernando Fernández. The film is the sequel to the film Love Street.

== Plot ==
Fernando (Fernando Fernández) and Queta (Meche Barba) manage the prosperous tortería Acá las tortas. The relationship between Fernando and Queta breaks down when he is related with two evil women, owners of a cabaret. Both women were protected by a corrupt cop who wants Queta, and convinces her to dance in the cabaret. When Fernando discovers her, he thinks that she has become into a whore. Fernando finished singing in ordinary cabarets, while Queta looking for a way to convince him of her innocence.

== Cast ==
- Meche Barba
- Fernando Fernández
- Lilia Prado
- Freddy Fernández "El Pichi"
- Alma Delia Fuentes
- Roberto Cobo
- Francisco Avitia
- Los Panchos

== Reviews ==
The film is a sequel to the same year film Love Street , also starring by Barba and Fernández.
