= Lilia Prado =

Mexican actress and dancer

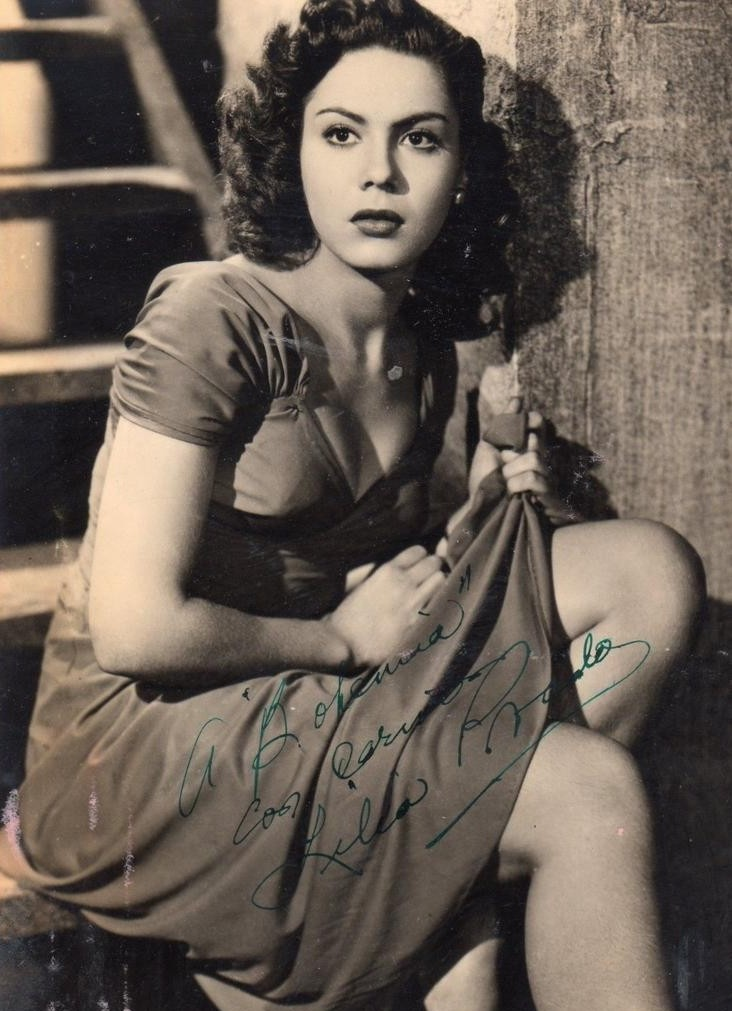
- Prado, c. 1950s
- Born: Leticia Lilia Amezcua Prado; 30 March 1928; Sahuayo, Michoacán, Mexico
- Died: 22 May 2006 (aged 78); Mexico City, Mexico
- Occupations: Actress, dancer
- Years active: 1947–1991

Leticia Lilia Amezcua Prado (30 March 1928 – 22 May 2006), known as Lilia Prado, was a Mexican actress and dancer. Noted for her beauty and on-screen sensuality, she was a famous star and sex symbol of the Golden Age of Mexican cinema.

Prado began her career in 1947 as an extra in films, and received her first leading role in Confidencias de un ruletero (1949). She was directed by Spanish filmmaker Luis Buñuel in Subida al cielo (1952), Abismos de pasión (1954), and La ilusión viaja en tranvía (1954). Her performance in Talpa (1956) earned her a nomination for the Ariel Award for Best Actress. She was Cantinflas' leading lady in the popular comedy El analfabeto (1961).

In 1999, Prado received the Golden Ariel for her career, and the following year she was honored by the Cineteca Nacional.

== Early life ==
Prado was born in Sahuayo, Michoacán, and from there her family moved to Mexico City, where she attended school. She wanted to be a dancer and travel around the world, but her father never gave her permission to study music or dance. In order to earn her own money, she began working as a telephone operator.

== Career ==
Her career began in 1946 when a journalist named Javier Campos took her to the set of the film Bel Ami at Estudios Azteca. The next day, she was given work as an extra. She appeared in uncredited roles in La barca de oro (1947) and Soy charro de Rancho Grande (1947), and had a "good little role" as a maid in Dueña y señora (1948).

Around the same time, she won a beauty contest and began attending acting classes. Celestino Gorostiza, one of her acting teachers, had much faith in her and directed her in play. When Prado left the stage to work in more films, Gorostiza told one of Prado's friends, "The cinema won a star, but the stage lost a good actress".

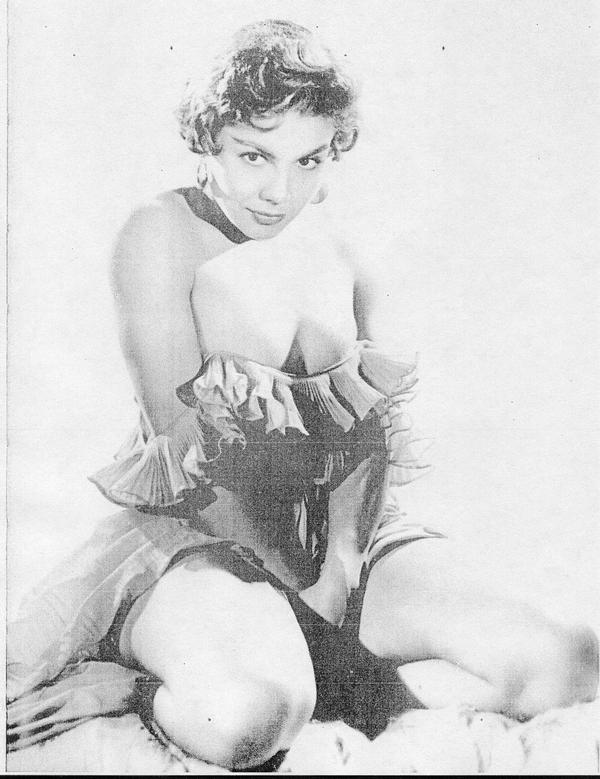
Prado in a publicity photo, c. 1950s

Prado obtained her first starring role in Confidencias de un ruletero (1949) with Resortes. The film was followed by musical and comedy films in which Prado "danced and showed her legs".

== Filmography ==
- The Golden Boat (1947)
- I Am a Charro of Rancho Grande (1947)
- Tania, the Beautiful Wild Girl (1948)
- Gangster's Kingdom (1948)
- Nocturne of Love (1948)
- Confessions of a Taxi Driver (1949)
- The Perez Family (1949)
- A Galician in Mexico (1949)
- love for Love (1950)
- When the Night Ends (1950)
- If I Were Just Anyone (1950)
- The Chicken Hawk (1951)
- My General's Women (1951)
- Crime and Punishment (1951)
- Subida al cielo (1952)
- The Three Happy Friends (1952)
- Hot Rhumba (1952)
- Hotel Room (1953)
- Abismos de pasión (1954)
- La ilusión viaja en tranvía (1954)
- La Vida no vale nada (1955)
- After the Storm (1955)
- Los Gavilanes (1956)
- Talpa (1956)
- Ando volando bajo (1959)
- Two Cheap Husbands (1960)
- El analfabeto (1961)
- Senda prohibida (1961)
- Los Cuervos están de luto (1965)
- México de noche (1968)
- La Vida inútil de Pito Pérez (1970)
- La Inocente (1972)
- El Rincón de las vírgenes (1972)
- Fé, Esperanza y Caridad (1974)
- La India (1976)
- Emanuelo (1984)
- Cinco nacos asaltan Las Vegas (1987)

== Bibliography ==
- Agrasánchez Jr., Rogelio (2001). Bellezas del cine mexicano/Beauties of Mexican Cinema. Archivo Fílmico Agrasánchez. ISBN 968-5077-11-8.
