= Amok (1944 film) =

- Directed by: Antonio Momplet
- Written by: Max Aub; Antonio Momplet; Erwin Wallfisch; Stefan Zweig (novella)
- Produced by: Gonzalo Elvira
- Starring: María Félix; Julián Soler; Stella Inda
- Edited by: Jorge Bustos
- Music by: Manuel Esperón; Agustín Lara
- Distributed by: Clasa Films Mundiales
- Release date: 22 December 1944 (Mexico)
- Running time: 106 minutes
- Country: Mexico
- Language: Spanish

Amok is a 1944 Mexican romantic drama film directed by Antonio Momplet and starring María Félix and Julián Soler. The film is based on the Stefan Zweig novella Der Amokläufer.

== Plot ==
A doctor (Julián Soler) embezzles the proceeds of his Parisian clinic in order to better support the manipulative woman (María Félix) with whom he is having an affair. After losing all the money while gambling, he is forced to flee to an undeveloped region of India. There, he tries to mitigate the onslaught of a disease the natives term "Amok", while his past mistakes still plague him, especially when a mysterious woman, Mrs. Belmont (María Félix), appears in his office. The surprising physical resemblance of the woman with her previous lover will end up driving him insane.

== Cast ==
- María Félix as Madame Travis / Mrs. Belmont
- Julián Soler as Dr. Jorge Martell
- Stella Inda as Tara
- Miguel Ángel Ferriz as Governor
- José Baviera as Mr. Belmont
- Paco Fuentes as Dr. Rozier
- Miguel Arenas as Jorge's Uncle
- Kali Karlo as Servant
- Carolina Barret as Rosa, maid
- Gustavo Rojo
- Arturo Soto Rangel as Don Eduardo
- Lupe del Castillo as Old Abortionist (as Guadalupe del Castillo)
- José Goula as Luis Blumenthal
- Enrique Cancino
- Carlos Aguirre
- Eduardo Noriega as Governor's Nephew
- Roberto Cañedo as Man in Casino (uncredited)
- Manuel Dondé as Indigenous Man (uncredited)
- Ana María Hernández as Woman in Casino (uncredited)
- Salvador Lozano as Man in Casino (uncredited)
- Manuel Pozos (uncredited)
