= Alfonso Mejía =

Mexican actor (1934–2021)

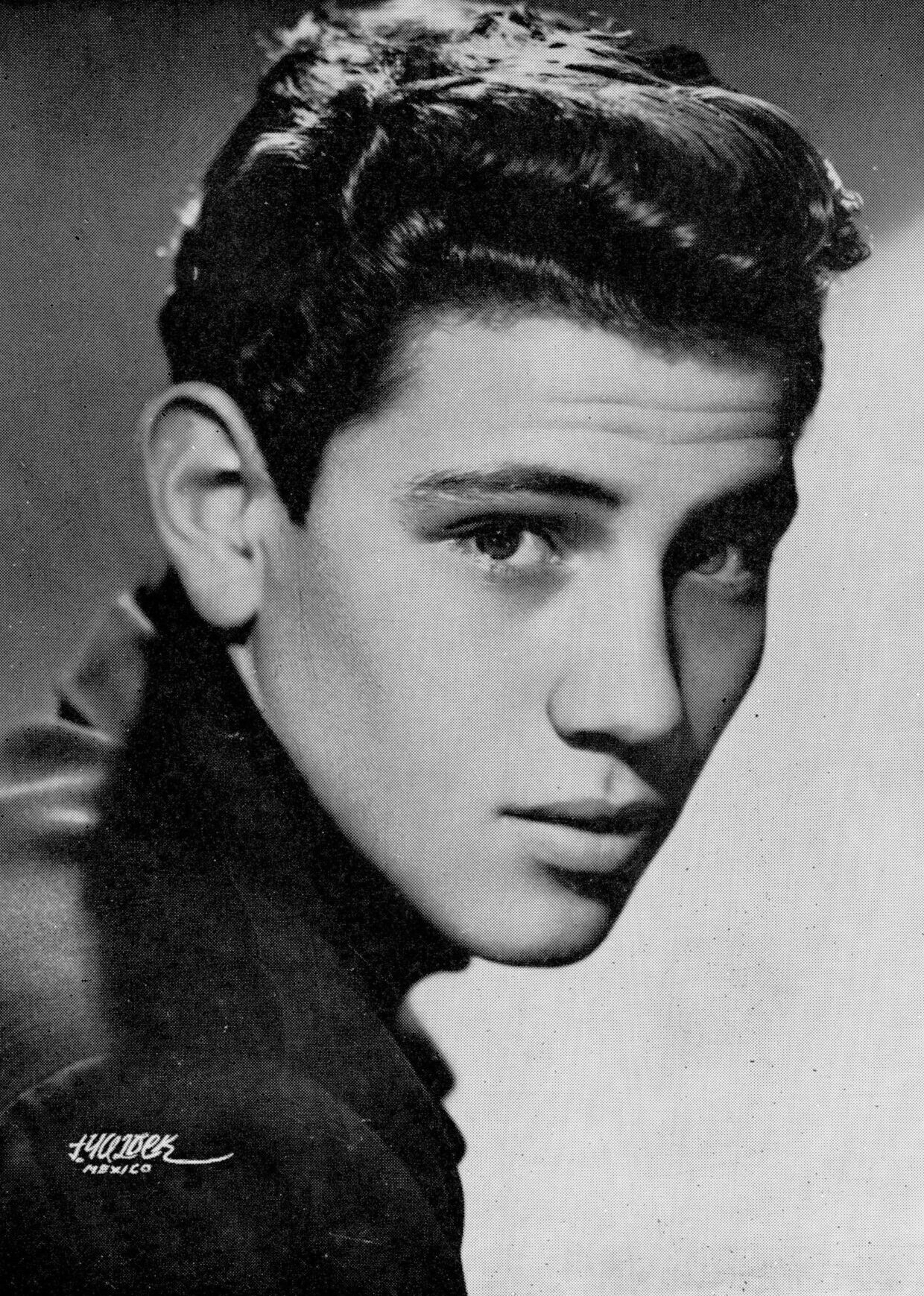
- Mejía in 1954
- Born: Alfonso Mejía Silva; 16 November 1934; Mexico City, Mexico
- Died: 29 December 2021 (aged 87); Mexico
- Occupation: Actor
- Years active: 1950–1970

Alfonso Mejía Silva (16 November 1934 – 29 December 2021) was a Mexican actor. He was best known for his lead role as "Pedro" in Los Olvidados (known in English as The Young and the Damned), for which he won the Best Child Actor award at the Cannes Film Festival in 1951. Director Luis Buñuel chose Mejía for the part. After a successful career in the 1950s and 1960s in Mexico, Mejia retired from the acting industry.

== Personal life and death ==
Mejía Silva died on 29 December 2021, at the age of 87.

== Filmography ==
- 1970 Rubí
- 1970 Las bestias jóvenes
- 1969 La frontera de cristal (television series)
- 1969 Arriba las manos
- 1968 Por mis pistolas
- 1967 Frontera (TV series)
- 1967 Detectives o ladrones..? (Dos agentes innocentes)
- 1967 Serenata en noche de luna
- 1967 Los tres mosqueteros de Dios
- 1965 Always Further On
- 1965 Río Hondo Miguel
- 1964 Los novios de mis hijas
- 1962 Los falsos héroes
- 1962 Contra viento y marea
- 1962 The Young and Beautiful Ones
- 1962 Juventud sin Dios (La vida del padre Lambert)
- 1961 Mañana serán hombres
- 1961 Machine Gun Man
- 1961 Vacations in Acapulco
- 1961 Chicas casaderas
- 1960 Puños de Roca
- 1960 Quinceañera Pancho
- 1959 La edad de la tentación
- 1958 The Boxer
- 1956 Juventud desenfrenada
- 1955 El túnel 6
- 1953 Padre nuestro
- 1952 My Wife and the Other One
- 1952 El mártir del Calvario
- 1951 La bienamada
- 1950 Los Olvidados
