= Martha Mijares =

Mexican actress (1938–2018)

- Born: January 19, 1938; Mexico City, Mexico
- Died: October 18, 2018 (aged 80)
- Occupation: Actress
- Years active: 1954–1960

Martha Mijares (19 January 1938 – 18 October 2018) was a Mexican film actress. She appeared in twenty seven films between 1954 and 1960 including the crime adventure Raffles. She belongs to the Golden Age of Mexican cinema.

== Selected filmography ==
- When I Leave (1954)
- Raffles (1958)
- Where Are Our Children Going? (1958)

== Bibliography ==
- Sicre, Jose Gomez. Dolores del Rio. General Secretariat of the Organization of American States, 1970.
