= Freddy Fernández (actor) =

Mexican film and television actor (1934–1995)

Alfredo Jesús Fernández Sáenz (January 16, 1934 – May 10, 1995) was a Mexican film and television actor, nicknamed El Pichi.

Fernández was born in Mexico City, the only son of Alfredo Fernández and Elisa Sáenz Rojas. As a youth, he joined the Children's Fine Arts Theatre Company of Fine Arts under the direction of Clementina Otero. The nickname "El Pichi" was given to Fernández by producer Luis Manrique during the making of the film Callejera in 1949.

He received the Virginia Fábregas medal from National Association of Actors (ANDA) for his 25 year career and was nominated three times for an Ariel Award. His son is Alfredo Fernández ("El Pato").

He died on May 10, 1995, of esophageal cancer in Mexico City, aged 61. His remains were buried in Cozumel, Quintana Roo, his son's garden.

== Filmography ==
=== Television ===
- Nosotros los Gómez (1986) - Freddy Gómez
- Mi colonia la esperanza (1983)
- El enemigo (1979)
- Teresa Raquin (1977) - Camilo
- Mi primer amor (1973)
- El juicio de nuestros hijos (1967)
- Llamada urgente (1965)
- La honra de vivir (1961)
- Conflicto (1961)
- Pecado mortal (1960) - Jose María

=== Films ===
- La negra tomasa (1993)
- Los guaruras (1985)
- Los malvivientes (1985)
- Crimen de ocasión (1985)
- El embustero (1985)
- Piernas cruzadas (1984)
- Tierra de valientes (1984)
- El sexo de los pobres (1983)
- El triángulo del crimen (1983)
- La caravana de la muerte (1983)
- El vecindario 2 (1983)
- Vividores de mujeres (1982)
- El que no corre vuela (1982) - Policía Costillas
- San Miguel el Alto (1982)
- El canto de los humildes (1982)
- Los pepenadores de acá (1982)
- Semana santa en Acapulco (1981)
- OK Míster Pancho (1981)
- El robo imposible (1981) - Richard Bond
- El vecindario (1981)
- California Dancing Club (1981)
- La casa prohibida (1981)
- Las tres tumbas (1980)
- El cara parchada (1980
- Adriana del Río, actriz (1979)
- Caminos de Michoacán (1979)
- La sotana del reo (1979) - Pantaleón
- El zorro blanco (1978)
- Coyote and Bronca (1978)
- Somos del otro Laredo (1977)
- Renuncia por motivos de salud
- El guía de las turistas (1976)
- El caballo torero (1973)
- Capulina contra las momias (El terror de Guanajuato) (1973)
- Santo contra los cazadores de cabezas (1971) - Carlos
- Jesús, nuestro Señor (1971) - Felipe
- El inolvidable Chucho el Roto (1971) - La Changa
- Los amores de Chucho el Roto (1970) - La Changa
- Yo soy Chucho el Roto (1970) - La Changa
- La vida de Chucho el Roto (1970) - La Changa
- María Isabel (1968)
- La venganza de Huracán Ramírez (1967) - Pichi
- El hijo de Huracán Ramírez (1966) - Pichi
- La recta final (1966)
- Falsificadores asesinos (1966)
- El dengue del amor (1965)
- El misterio de Huracán Ramírez (1962) - Pichi
- Los amigos maravilla (1962)
- Twist, locura de juventud (1962) - Boris
- Trampa fatal (1961)
- Juego diabólico (1961)
- El tesoro del indito (1961)
- En carne propia (1961)
- La llamada de la muerte (1960)
- His First Love (1960)
- El gran pillo (1960)
- Paso a la juventud (1958)
- Águila Negra vs. los diablos de la pradera - Manuel Arvide
- The Boxer (1958)
- La sombra del otro (1957)
- La ciudad de los niños (1957)
- La mujer que no tuvo infancia (1957)
- Las manzanas de Dorotea (1957)
- Daniel Boone, Trail Blazer (1956) - Israel Boone
- Bataclán mexicano (1956)
- El hombre que quiso ser pobre (1956)
- Con quién andan nuestras hijas (1956) - Tony
- Mi canción eres tú (1956)
- La venganza de los Villalobos (1955)
- Los tres Villalobos (1955)
- Venganza en el circo (1954) - Freddy
- La segunda mujer (1953)
- Pepe el Toro (1953) - El Ata
- ¡Yo soy gallo dondequiera! (1953)
- Huracán Ramírez (1953)
- Una calle entre tú y yo (1952)
- When Children Sin (1952) - El Pichi
- Yo fui una callejera (1952)
- Passionflower (1952)
- Los pobres siempre van al cielo (1951)
- Negro es mi color (1951)
- Arrabalera (1951)
- Love for Sale (1951)
- The Two Orphans (1950)
- Orange Blossom for Your Wedding (1950) - Eduardo
- If I Were Just Anyone (1950)
- Amor de la calle (1950)
- Callejera (1949)
- Ustedes los ricos (1948) - El Ata
- Arsène Lupin (1947)
- Bartolo toca la flauta (1945)
- Tribunal de Justicia (1944)
- El médico de las locas (1944)
- Cristóbal Colón (1943)
- Morenita clara (1943)
