= The Flesh Commands =

1948 film

- Directed by: Chano Urueta
- Written by: Mariano Azuela; Chano Urueta
- Produced by: Eduardo Quevedo
- Starring: Esther Fernández; David Silva; Rosita Fornés
- Distributed by: Calderon Films
- Release date: 29 April 1948
- Running time: 100 minutes
- Country: Mexico
- Language: Spanish

The Flesh Commands (Spanish: La carne manda) is a 1948 Mexican drama film directed by Chano Urueta and starring Esther Fernández, David Silva and Rosita Fornés.

== Cast ==
- Esther Fernández
- David Silva
- Rosita Fornés
- Emma Roldán
- José Pulido
- Eva Calvo
- Alma Delia Fuentes
- Max Langler
- Pepe Martínez
- José Morcillo
- Juan Pulido
- José Eduardo Pérez
- Manuel Trejo Morales

== Bibliography ==
- Aviña, Rafael. David Silva: un campeón de mil rostros. UNAM, 2007.
- Gledhill, Christine & Williams, Linda. Melodrama Unbound: Across History, Media, and National Cultures. Columbia University Press, 2018.
- Riera, Emilio García . Historia documental del cine mexicano: 1946–1948. Universidad de Guadalajara, 1992.
