= El baisano Jalil =

1942 film

- Directed by: Joaquín Pardavé, Roberto Gavaldón
- Written by: Adolfo Fernández Bustamante (story), Alberto Novión play "El gringo Baratieri", Joaquín Pardavé adaptation
- Produced by: Gregorio Walerstein
- Starring: Sara García
- Cinematography: Víctor Herrera
- Music by: Mario Ruiz Armengol
- Release date: 1942
- Country: Mexico
- Language: Spanish

El baisano Jalil is a 1942 Mexican film, directed by Joaquín Pardavé and Roberto Gavaldón. It stars Sara García. The story is about Lebanese immigrants to Mexico in the early 19th century.
