= His First Love =

- Directed by: Juan José Ortega
- Written by: Juan José Ortega
- Produced by: Juan José Ortega
- Starring: Rafael Bertrand; Teresa Velázquez; Freddy Fernández; Anabelle Gutiérrez
- Cinematography: Rosalío Solano
- Edited by: José W. Bustos
- Music by: Antonio Díaz Conde
- Production company: Compañía Cinematográfica Mexicana
- Release date: 4 August 1960
- Running time: 87 minutes
- Country: Mexico
- Language: Spanish

His First Love (Spanish: Su primer amor) is a 1960 Mexican musical comedy film produced, written and directed by Juan José Ortega, and starring Rafael Bertrand, Teresa Velázquez, Freddy Fernández and Anabelle Gutiérrez.

== Cast ==
- Rafael Bertrand
- Teresa Velázquez
- Freddy Fernández
- Anabelle Gutiérrez
- Domingo Soler
- Conchita Gentil Arcos
- Magda Donato
- Antonio Raxel
- Carlos Amador
- Omar Jasso
- Nora Veryán
- Rosina Navarro
- Julio Nader
- Rafael Estrada
- Jorge Mondragon
- Ángel Merino

== Bibliography ==
- Emilio García Riera. Historia documental del cine mexicano: 1959-1960. Universidad de Guadalajara, 1994.
