= Fernando Fernández =

Fernando Fernández may refer to:

- Fernando Fernández (actor) (1916–1999), Mexican actor and singer known as "El Crooner de México"
- Fernando Fernández (comics) (1940–2010), Spanish comic book artist
- Fernando Fernández (distiller) (1850–1940), founder of the oldest rum manufacturing company in Puerto Rico
- Fernando Fernandez (jockey) (1906–1988), Cuban-born, American horse racing jockey
- Fernando Fernández (Paraguayan footballer) (born 1992), Paraguayan football forward
- Fernando Fernández (Spanish footballer) (born 1979), Spanish footballer
- Fernando Fernández de Carrión (died c. 1125), Spanish nobleman
- Fernando Fernández de Córdova (1809–1883), Spanish politician
- Fernando Fernández de Ovando, Spanish diplomat and nobleman
- Fernando Fernández García (born 1954), Mexican politician
- Fernando Fernández Martín (born 1943), Spanish politician
- Fernando Fernández Sánchez (born 1990), Peruvian chess master
- Fernando Fernandez (businessman) (born 1966), Argentinian businessman

== Characters ==
- Fernando Fernandez (Hollyoaks)

== See also ==
- Fernando Fernandes (disambiguation)
