= Los Olvidados =

- Film poster
- Directed by: Luis Buñuel
- Written by: Luis Buñuel; Luis Alcoriza
- Produced by: Óscar Dancigers
- Starring: Stella Inda; Miguel Inclán; Alfonso Mejía; Roberto Cobo
- Cinematography: Gabriel Figueroa
- Edited by: Carlos Savage
- Music by: Rodolfo Halffter; Gustavo Pittaluga
- Distributed by: Ultramar Films
- Release dates: 9 December 1950 (Mexico); April 1951 (Cannes)
- Running time: 88 minutes
- Country: Mexico
- Language: Mexican Spanish
- Budget: MX$450,000

Los Olvidados (Spanish: [los olβiˈðaðos], Spanish: The Forgotten Ones; known in the United States as The Young and the Damned) is a 1950 Mexican teen crime film directed by Luis Buñuel. It was filmed at Tepeyac Studios and on location in Mexico City.

Producer Óscar Dancigers sought Buñuel to direct following the success of El Gran Calavera (1949). Buñuel already had a script ready titled ¡Mi huerfanito jefe! about a boy who sells lottery tickets. However, Dancigers had in mind a more realistic and serious depiction of children in poverty in Mexico City. After conducting research, Jesús Camacho and Buñuel came up with a script that Dancigers was pleased with. The film can be seen in the tradition of social realism, although it also contains elements of surrealism present in much of Buñuel's work.

While widely criticized upon initial release, Los olvidados received Best Director at the 1951 Cannes Film Festival. It is now considered as one of the greatest and most influential films of all time.

== Plot ==
The film is about a group of destitute children and their misfortunes in a Mexico City slum. El Jaibo escapes juvenile jail and reunites with the street gang that he leads. They attempt to rob a blind street musician and, failing at first, later track him down, beat him, and destroy his instruments.

With the help of Pedro, El Jaibo tracks down Julián, the youngster who supposedly sent him to jail. El Jaibo puts his unharmed arm in a sling, hides a rock in it and confronts Julián, who denies that he reported him to the police and refuses to fight El Jaibo because it would not be a fair fight. As Julián starts to walk away, El Jaibo hits him in the back of the head with the rock. He then beats Julián to death with a stick and takes his money. El Jaibo warns Pedro not to report the crime and shares Julián's money with Pedro to make him an accomplice.

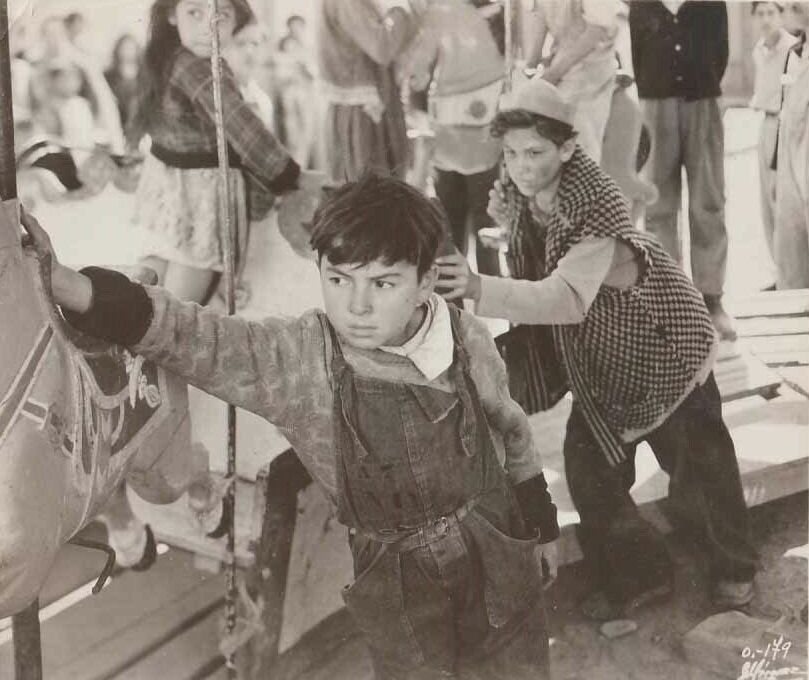
Alfonso Mejía as Pedro (right, behind) in a publicity photo for the film

Pedro's mother resents her son's behavior, and shows that she doesn't love or care for him. Pedro is saddened by this, vows to start behaving better and finds work as apprentice to a blacksmith. One day, El Jaibo comes to talk with him about their secret and, unbeknownst to Pedro, steals a customer's knife from the blacksmith's table. Pedro is accused of the crime and sent to a juvenile rehabilitation program, the "farm school", where he gets into a fight and kills two chickens. The principal tests Pedro by handing Pedro a 50 pesos bill to run errands with. Pedro accepts and leaves with the intention to complete the errands. As soon as he leaves, he encounters El Jaibo, who steals the money. Upset that his attempt to be good was foiled again, Pedro tracks down El Jaibo and fights him. The fight ends in a stalemate, but Pedro announces to the crowd that it was El Jaibo who killed Julián. El Jaibo flees, but the blind man has heard the accusation and tells the police.

Pedro tracks El Jaibo down once again to murder him. El Jaibo kills Pedro. While fleeing, El Jaibo encounters the police and, as he tries to run away, the police shoot and kill him. Meche and her grandfather find Pedro's body in their shed. Not wanting to get involved, they dump his body down a garbage-covered cliff. On their way, they pass Pedro's mother, who, though once unconcerned with her disobedient child, is now searching for him.

== Alternate ending ==
In 2002, it was announced that an alternate ending for Los Olvidados (labeled "the happy ending") was discovered at the Film Warehouse of the National Autonomous University of Mexico, and it would be restored digitally in order to show it to the public. On 8 July 2005, it was rescreened with the alternate ending in a few selected venues and included in subsequent DVD releases.

At the International Cinematographic Festival in Saltillo, Coahuila, Mexico, on 3 February 2011, the last surviving member of the cast, Alfonso Mejía (Pedro), introduced the alternative ending to the film.

The alternative ending begins with El Jaibo and Pedro fighting in an abandoned warehouse. Pedro pushes El Jaibo from the roof, where he falls to his death. Pedro frisks the body for the money El Jaibo stole from him (in contrast to the original ending, where Pedro is murdered by El Jaibo). Pedro returns to the farm school with the money that the principal entrusted to him.

== Cast ==
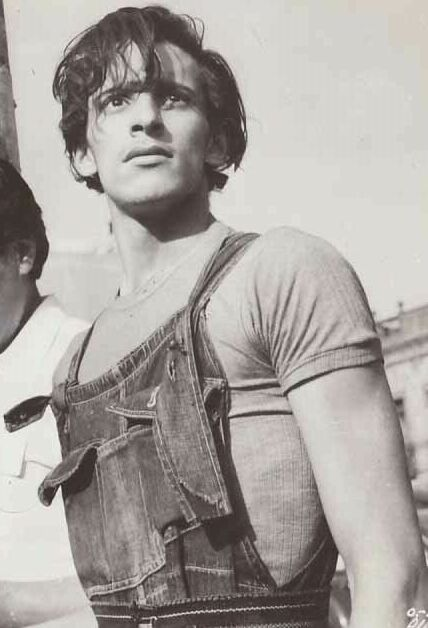
Roberto Cobo as el Jaibo in a publicity photograph for the film

- Stella Inda as Pedro's mother
- Miguel Inclán as Don Carmelo, the blind man
- Alfonso Mejía as Pedro
- Roberto Cobo as "El Jaibo" ("the crab", a nickname for a person from Tampico)
- Alma Delia Fuentes as Meche
- Francisco Jambrina as the principal of the rural school
- Jesús Navarro as Julián's father
- Efraín Arauz as "Cacarizo" ("pockmarked")
- Jorge Pérez as "Pelón" ("baldy")
- Javier Amézcua as Julián
- Mário Ramírez as "Ojitos" ("Little Eyes"), the lost boy
- Ernesto Alonso as Narrator (uncredited)

== Analysis ==
Thematically, Los Olvidados is similar to Buñuel's earlier Spanish film, Land Without Bread. Both films deal with the never-ending cycle of poverty and despair. Los Olvidados is especially interesting because although "Buñuel employed [...] elements of Italian neorealism", a concurrent movement across the Atlantic Ocean marked by "outdoor locations, nonprofessional actors, low budget productions, and a focus on the working classes", Los Olvidados is not a neorealist film (Fernandez, 42). "Neorealist reality is incomplete, conventional, and above all rational", Buñuel wrote in a 1953 essay titled "Poetry and Cinema". "The poetry, the mystery, all that completes and enlarges tangible reality is utterly lacking" (Sklar, 324). Los Olvidados contains such surrealistic shots as when "a boy throws an egg at the camera lens, where it shatters and drips" or a scene in which a boy has a dream in slow-motion (Sklar, 324). The surrealist dream sequence was actually shot in reverse and switched in post-production. Buñuel does not romanticize the characters, and even the abused blind man is revealed to have cruel habits of preying on children and selling fake elixirs. Film historian Carl J. Mora has said of Los olvidados that the director "visualized poverty in a radically different way from the traditional forms of Mexican melodrama. Buñuel's street children are not 'ennobled' by their desperate struggle for survival; they are in fact ruthless predators who are not better than their equally unromanticized victims".

== Controversy about possible plagiarism ==
Journalist Verónica Calderón, in an article published on 14 August 2010 in the Spanish newspaper El País, collects statements by Morelia Guerrero, daughter of Mexican journalist and writer Jesús R. Guerrero (Numarán, Michoacán, 1911–1979), in which Morelia points out that the script and the film are based on a novel written by her father, entitled Los Olvidados, published in 1944, with a prologue by Mexican writer José Revueltas. The National Polytechnic Institute of Mexico (IPN) published, in December 2009, a second edition of the novel penned by Jesús R. Guerrero. However, comparative studies have been made between the film and the novel, and no trace of any plagiarism by Buñuel has been found.

== Reception ==
=== Initial ===
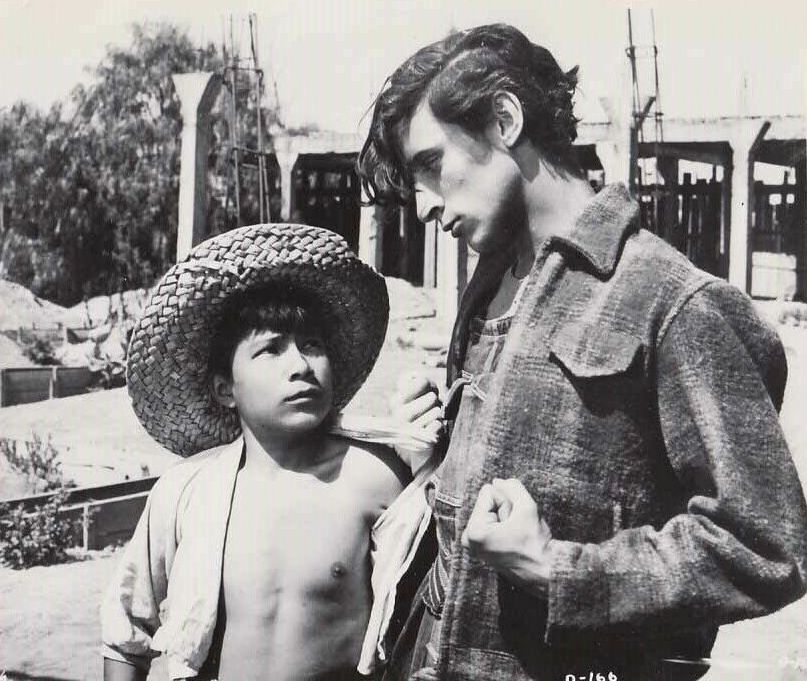
Mario Ramírez and Roberto Cobo (right) in a publicity still for the film

Los Olvidados was largely disparaged by the Mexican press upon its release. Juan Carlos Ibáñez and Manuel Palacio write, "The film was so harsh and innovative, so critical and daring in its statements that during its first screenings, spectators openly aired their indignation towards the features of Mexican identity presented by Buñuel." The work was also criticized as overly bleak.

Critic for The New Yorker, Pauline Kael wrote that in Los Olvidados "Buñuel makes you understand the pornography of brutality: the pornography is in what human beings are capable of doing to other human beings."

=== Retrospective ===
Many critics have since proclaimed Los Olvidados a masterpiece. On the review aggregator website Rotten Tomatoes, 91% of 43 critics' reviews are positive. The website's consensus reads: "Los Olvidados casts an unsparing eye on juvenile crime -- and the systemically flawed societies that allow it to flourish." It was inscribed on UNESCO's Memory of the World International Register in 2003 in recognition of its historical significance.

The work placed 110th in the 2012 Sight & Sound critics' poll of the greatest films ever made. In April 2019, a restored version of the film was selected to be shown in the Cannes Classics section at the 2019 Cannes Film Festival. The film is ranked number 2 in the list of the best 100 Mexican films of all time according to 25 cinema critics (1994/2020).

== Influence ==
Los Olvidados has been cited as an influence on films such as Pixote (1980), Amores perros (2000), and City of God (2002).
