= Rosita Fornés =

American singer (1923–2020)

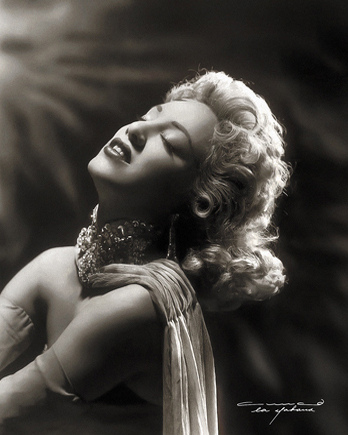
- Born: Rosalía Lourdes Elisa Palet Bonavia; February 11, 1923; New York City, New York, U.S.
- Died: June 10, 2020 (aged 97); Miami, Florida, U.S.
- Citizenship: Cuba; United States
- Occupations: Actress; singer; vedette
- Years active: 1938–2020
- Spouses: Manuel Medel (divorced); Armando Bianchi
- Children: 1

Rosalía Lourdes Elisa Palet Bonavia (February 11, 1923 – June 10, 2020), known as Rosita Fornés, was an American actress, singer and vedette. She was noted for her multifaceted career in the entertainment industry of Cuba. She worked in cinema, theater, radio, television and cabaret.

== Early life ==
Fornés was born on February 11, 1923, in New York City and moved to Cuba as a child. Her parents were immigrants from Spain. Her father was Catalan and her mother was from Madrid. They eventually divorced and her mother remarried when Fornés was approximately five. She took her stepfather's name. When she was ten, the family moved to Spain, where they lived for three years before returning to Cuba.

== Career ==
Fornés made her stage debut in 1938, when she featured in the musical comedy La corte suprema del arte. She subsequently appeared in two Cuban films before moving to Mexico, where she starred in several films during the Golden Age of Mexican cinema. These included The Desire, Del can-can al mambo, Cara sucia, and Se acabaron las mujeres.

She returned to Cuba in 1952, and appeared on Cuban television.

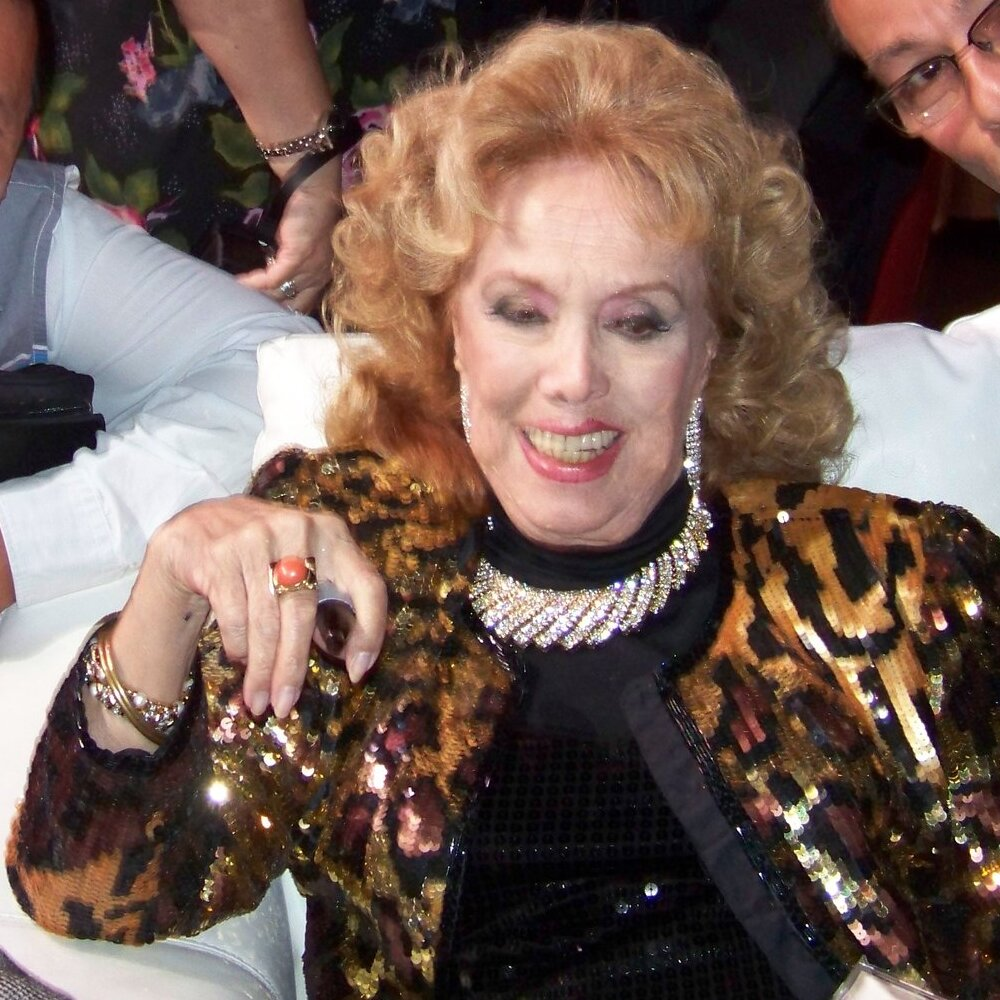
Fornés in 2011

Fornés was lauded for being one of the pioneers of Cuban television. Her versatility meant that she was able to perform in various areas of the Cuban entertainment industry. These included cinema, the theater, radio, television and cabaret. She gave her final performance in 2019, one year before her death. It took place at a tribute concert for Meme Solis held at the Miami-Dade County Auditorium.

== Personal life ==
Fornés' first marriage was to Manuel Medel. They resided in Mexico and had one daughter together, Rosa María. She moved back to Havana in 1952 after they divorced. She subsequently married Armando Bianchi. They moved to Spain, where they worked for the Barcelona Comic Theater, the Madrid Theater and the Alcázar Theater from 1957 until 1959, before he died in 1981.

Fornés died on June 10, 2020, at a hospital in the Miami metropolitan area. She was 97, and had suffered complications from emphysema.

== Selected filmography ==
- A Dangerous Adventure (1939)
- Musical Romance (1941)
- The Flesh Commands (1948)
- The Desire (1948)
- From the Can-Can to the Mambo (1951)
- Women of the Theatre (1951)
- The Unknown Mariachi (1953)
- Me Gustan Todas / Hotel Tropical' (1954) Dir: Juan J. Ortega. País: México-Cuba
- No me olvides nunca (1955) Dir: Juan J. Ortega. Country: México-Cuba
- Palmer ha muerto (1960) Dir: Juan Fortuny. Country: Puerto Rico-España
- Se permuta (1984) Dir: Juan Carlos Tabío. País: Cuba
- Plácido (1986) Dir: Sergio Giral. País: Cuba
- Hoy como ayer / El bárbaro del ritmo (1987) Dir: Constante "Rapi" Diego / Sergio Véjar. Country: Cuba-México
- Papeles Secundarios (1989) Dir: Orlando Rojas. Country: Cuba-España
- Quiéreme y verás (1994) Dir: Daniel Díaz Torres. Country: Cuba
- Las noches de Constantinopla (2001) Dir: Orlando Rojas. Country: Cuba-España
- Al atardecer (2001) Dir: Tomás Piard. Country: Cuba
- Tin Tan, un documental de Francesco Taboada Tabone. (2010) Country: México
- Mejilla con mejilla (2011) Dir: Delso Aquino. Country: Cuba
