= No matarás =

1943 Mexican film by Chano Urueta

- Theatrical release poster
- Directed by: Chano Urueta
- Release date: 1943
- Country: Mexico
- Language: Spanish

No matarás ("Do Not Kill") is a 1943 Mexican film directed by Chano Urueta. It is the debut film of actress Katy Jurado, who was 19 years old at the time.
