= Arrabalera (1951 film) =

1951 film

- Directed by: Joaquín Pardavé
- Written by: Luis Manrique; Joaquín Pardavé
- Produced by: Luis Manrique
- Starring: Marga López; Fernando Fernández; Freddy Fernández
- Cinematography: Enrique Wallace
- Edited by: Juan José Marino
- Music by: Sergio Guerrero
- Release date: 4 April 1951
- Running time: 93 minutes
- Country: Mexico
- Language: Spanish

Arrabalera is a 1951 Mexican comedy drama film directed by Joaquín Pardavé and starring Marga López, Fernando Fernández and Freddy Fernández. The film's sets were designed by the art director Jorge Fernández.

== Partial cast ==
- Marga López as Rosita Villaseñor
- Fernando Fernández as Roberto
- Freddy Fernández as Pichi
- Manolo Fábregas as Felipe
- Manolita Saval as Ana María
- Armando Velasco as Don Juanito Dueñas
- Joaquín Cordero as Luis
- Quintín Bulnes as Belindo
- Aurora Walker as Doña Lupe
- Pascual García Peña
- Eufrosina García as Doña Epifania
- Trio Los Panchitos as Cantantes
- Roberto G. Rivera as Cantante
- Manuel Hernández as Cantante
- Eva Garza as Cantante
- Trio Martino as Grupo musical

== Bibliography ==
- Deborah R. Vargas. Dissonant Divas in Chicana Music: The Limits of la Onda. University of Minnesota Press, 2012.
