= Fernando Fernandes =

Fernando Fernandes may refer to:

- Fernando Fernandes (footballer) (born 1971), Angolan footballer
- Fernando Fernandes (hurdler) (1920–1990s), Portuguese track and field athlete
- Fernando Fernandes (runner) (born 1983), Brazilian distance runner; see 2005 South American Championships in Athletics
- Fernando Fernandes de Pádua, Brazilian paracanoeist, TV host and model

== See also ==
- Fernando Fernández (disambiguation)
