= Lupita Palomera =

- Born: María Guadalupe Palomera Chávez; 12 December 1913; La Yesca, Tepic Territory, Mexico
- Died: 16 November 2008 (aged 94) Mexico City, Mexico
- Genres: Bolero; ranchera; tango
- Occupation: Singer
- Instrument: Vocals
- Labels: RCA Victor; Columbia; Continental

María Guadalupe Palomera Chávez (12 December 1913 – 16 November 2008), known as Lupita Palomera, was a Mexican singer, one of the first and most notable bolero performers in the Golden Age of Mexican cinema. She was known for some time as "La Novia de la Canción" (The Sweetheart of Song) and was also called "La Voz más Dulce de la Radio" (The Radio's Sweetest Voice).

== Life and career ==
María Guadalupe Palomera Chávez was born in 1913 in La Yesca, Tepic Territory, which later became the State of Nayarit. Her father, Luis Palomera, was the municipal treasurer of La Yesca. Her family later moved to Guadalajara, Jalisco.

Palomera made her debut singing on Guadalajara's XED radio station. She made her first recording in 1937, but achieved her first great success with her 1938 recording of Gonzalo Curiel's "Vereda tropical". She recorded exclusively for RCA Víctor and sang on programs for XEW. She also recorded several Mexican folk songs with her husband, singer Fernando Fernández, the father of her three daughters.

Palomera died in November 2008 at the age of 94.

== Discography ==
=== Studio albums ===
- Canta Lupita Palomera (RCA Victor)
- La inspiración de Agustín Lara en la voz de Lupita Palomera (RCA Victor)
- La inspiración de los Hnos. Domínguez en la voz de Lupita Palomera (RCA Victor)
- Vereda tropical (Continental)

=== Compilation albums ===
- Tú, sólo tú y otros éxitos
- Lo mejor de lo mejor: Lupita Palomera (2000)
- Recordando (2014)

== Filmography ==
- Hombres de mar (1938)
- Padre mercader (1938)
- Sangre en las montañas (1938)
- El circo trágico (1939)
- Nuevo amanecer (1954)
