= Stella Inda =

Mexican actress (1924–1995)

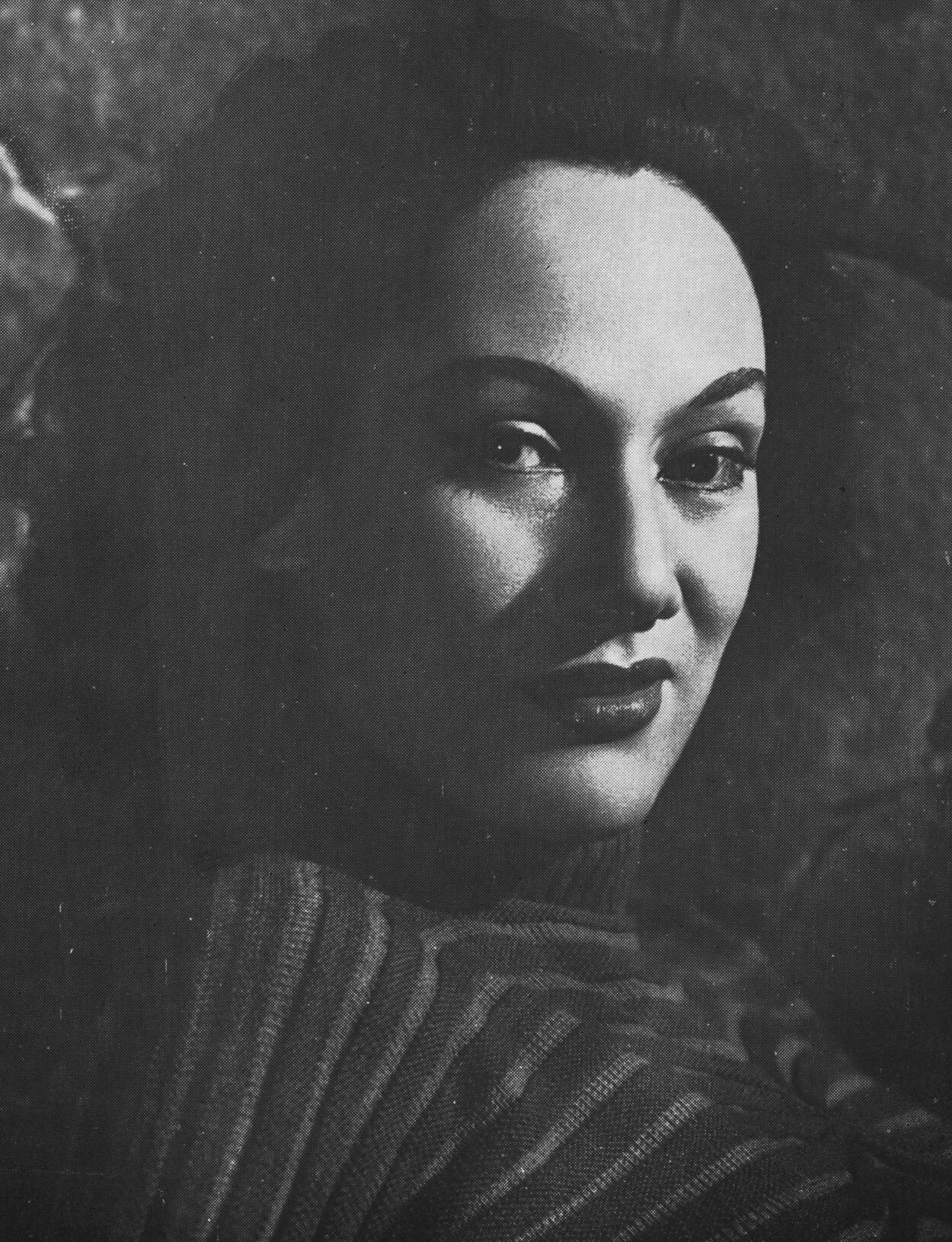
- Stella Inda in 1954
- Born: Estela Inda; June 28, 1924; Pátzcuaro, Mexico
- Died: December 7, 1995 (aged 71); Mexico City, Mexico
- Years active: 1934–1991

Stella (or Estela) Inda (June 28, 1924 – December 7, 1995) was a Mexican film actress. She was the star of notable Mexican films, including Los olvidados by Luis Buñuel in 1949.

== Biography ==
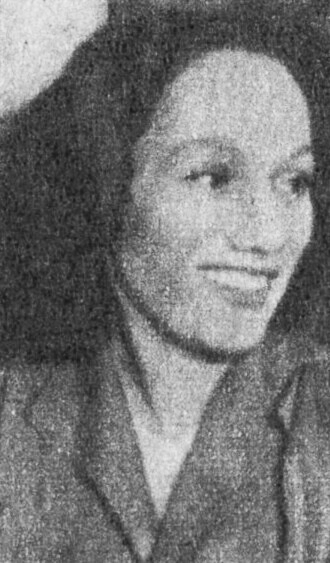
Stella Inda in 1945

Inda started her career as extra in the successful film La Mujer del Puerto (1934), which starred Andrea Palma. Also, she participated in Mexican films such as The Night of the Mayas (1939), Santa (second sound version, 1943), Bugambilia (1944, with Dolores del Río), Amok (1945, with María Félix), and the success films Los olvidados (1949, directed by Luis Buñuel and El Rebozo de Soledad (1955, directed by Roberto Gavaldón). In the later years, she was an acting teacher in the Instituto Nacional de Bellas Artes in Mexico, and directed a folkloric dance group called "Stella Inda y su Conjunto".

In 1947 she had a prominent but uncredited role as the historical personage La Malinche in the Hollywood epic Captain from Castile, opposite Cesar Romero as Hernán Cortés.

== Partial filmography ==
- La Mujer del Puerto (1934)
- Mujeres sin Alma (1934)
- The Blood Stain (1937)
- The Night of the Mayas (1939)
- Santa (1943)
- Lightning in the South (1943)
- The Escape (1944)
- Bugambilia (1944)
- Amok (1945)
- Tragic Wedding (1946)
- Captain from Castile (1947)
- Los olvidados (1949)
- El Rebozo de Soledad (1952)
- The Aztec Mummy (1957)
- Fé, Esperanza y Caridad (1973)
