= Soledad's Shawl =

1952 film

- Directed by: Roberto Gavaldón
- Written by: José Revueltas; Roberto Gavaldón; Estela Inda
- Based on: El rebozo de Soledad; 1952 novel by Javier López Ferrer
- Produced by: Miguel Alemán Velasco; Rodolfo Landa
- Starring: Arturo de Córdova; Pedro Armendáriz; Estela Inda
- Cinematography: Gabriel Figueroa
- Edited by: Charles L. Kimball
- Music by: Francisco Domínguez
- Production company: Cinematográfica Televoz
- Distributed by: Cinematográfica Televoz
- Release date: 13 November 1952
- Running time: 108 minutes
- Country: Mexico
- Language: Spanish

Soledad's Shawl (Spanish: El rebozo de Soledad) is a 1952 Mexican western film directed by Roberto Gavaldón and starring Arturo de Córdova, Pedro Armendáriz, and Estela Inda. The film's sets were designed by the art director Salvador Lozano Mena. In the film, a doctor moves to a poor rural area where he falls in love with a peasant girl.

== Cast ==
- Arturo de Córdova as Dr. Alberto Robles
- Pedro Armendáriz as Roque Suazo
- Estela Inda as Soledad
- Domingo Soler as Father Juan
- Carlos López Moctezuma as David Acosta
- Jaime Fernández as Mauro
- Rosaura Revueltas as Mother of baby
- Manuel Arvide as Doctor
- José Baviera as Doctor
- Guillermo Calles
- Lupe Carriles as Receptionist
- Felipe de Flores
- Norma Giménez
- Gilberto González
- Francisco Jambrina as Alfonso Gómez Ugarte
- Mario Humberto Jiménez Pons
- Mario Jiménez
- José María Linares-Rivas as Doctor
- José Muñoz
- Lucrecia Muñoz as La novia
- Yolanda Nieto
- Juan Orraca
- Ignacio Peón
- Hernán Vera as Mayor

== Bibliography ==
- Erica Segre. Intersected Identities: Strategies of Visualisation in Nineteenth- and Twentieth-century Mexican Culture. Berghahn Books, 2007.
