= Pompey the Conqueror =

1953 film by René Cardona

- Directed by: René Cardona
- Written by: René Cardona; Antonio Monsell; José Muñoz Román (play); Sebastián Gabriel Rovira
- Produced by: Guillermo Calderón; Pedro A. Calderón
- Starring: Joaquín Pardavé; Manolo Fábregas; Pepita Morillo
- Cinematography: José Ortiz Ramos
- Edited by: Alfredo Rosas Priego
- Music by: Antonio Díaz Conde
- Production companies: Producciones Calderón; MGM
- Distributed by: MGM
- Release date: 21 January 1953
- Running time: 80 minutes
- Country: Mexico
- Language: Spanish

Pompey the Conqueror (Spanish: Pompeyo el conquistador) is a 1953 Mexican comedy drama film directed by René Cardona and starring Joaquín Pardavé, Manolo Fábregas and Pepita Morillo. The film's sets were designed by the art director Manuel Fontanals.

== Partial cast ==
- Joaquín Pardavé as Don Pompeyo Gallo / Froilán
- Manolo Fábregas as Carlos
- Pepita Morillo as Rosaura
- Lily Aclemar as Milagros
- Jorge Sareli as Almirindo Campeiro, esposo de Palmira
- Gloria Mestre as Lucila
- Jesús Valero as Doctor Sarcófago Puntilla
- Tana Lynn as Palmira
- Roberto Cobo as Crisanto Naranjo
- Antonio Monsell as Beto
- Julián de Meriche as Maestro de baile

== Bibliography ==
- María Luisa Amador. Cartelera cinematográfica, 1950-1959. UNAM, 1985.
