= Courtesan (film) =

1948 film by Alberto Gout Àbrego

- Directed by: Alberto Gout
- Written by: Alberto Gout; Antonio Monsell; Sebastián Gabriel Rovira
- Produced by: Alfonso Rosas Priego
- Starring: Crox Alvarado; Meche Barba; Gustavo Rojo
- Cinematography: Alex Phillips
- Edited by: Alfredo Rosas Priego
- Music by: Agustín Lara
- Production company: Producciones Rosas Priego
- Release date: 12 May 1948
- Running time: 91 minutes
- Country: Mexico
- Language: Spanish

Courtesan (Spanish: Cortesana) is a 1948 Mexican drama film directed and co-written by Alberto Gout and starring Crox Alvarado, Meche Barba and Gustavo Rojo. The film's sets were designed by the art director Carlos Toussaint.

== Cast ==
In alphabetical order

- Crox Alvarado
- Meche Barba
- Pepe Delgado
- Leopoldo Francés
- Raúl Guerrero
- Daniel 'Chino' Herrera
- Toña la Negra
- David Lama
- Kika Meyer
- Chimi Monterrey
- Pepita Morillo
- Blanca Estela Pavón
- Humberto Rodríguez
- Gustavo Rojo
- Rubén Rojo
- Arturo Soto Rangel
- Juan Bruno Tarraza
- María Luisa Velázquez

== Bibliography ==
- Andrew Grant Wood. Agustin Lara: A Cultural Biography. OUP USA, 2014.
