= Northern Courier =

1960 film

- Directed by: Zacarías Gómez Urquiza
- Production company: Universal S.A.
- Release date: 15 December 1960
- Running time: 65 minutes
- Country: Mexico
- Language: Spanish

Northern Courier (Spanish: El correo del norte) is a 1960 Mexican western film directed by Zacarías Gómez Urquiza.

== Cast ==
- Luis Aguilar
- Fernando Almada
- José Chávez
- Rosa de Castilla as Carmela
- Fernando Fernández
- Jaime Fernández
- Rosario Gálvez
- Arturo Martínez

== Bibliography ==
- Pitts, Michael R. Western Movies: A Guide to 5,105 Feature Films. McFarland, 2012.
