= From the Can-Can to the Mambo =

1951 film

- Directed by: Chano Urueta
- Written by: Chano Urueta; José Luis de Celis
- Produced by: Guillermo Calderón; José Luis Calderón; Pedro A. Calderón
- Starring: Joaquín Pardavé; Abel Salazar; Rosita Fornés
- Cinematography: Víctor Herrera
- Edited by: Alfredo Rosas Priego
- Music by: Antonio Díaz Conde
- Production company: Producciones Calderón
- Release date: 15 November 1951
- Running time: 107 minutes
- Country: Mexico
- Language: Spanish

From the Can-Can to the Mambo (Spanish: Del can-can al mambo) is a 1951 Mexican musical comedy film directed by Chano Urueta and starring Joaquín Pardavé, Abel Salazar and Rosita Fornés. It was shot at the Churubusco Studios in Mexico City. The film's sets were designed by the art director Manuel Fontanals.

== Cast ==
- Joaquín Pardavé as Don Susanito Llueve o Truene
- Abel Salazar as Roberto
- Rosita Fornés as Clotilde
- Rosario Gutiérrez as Martha
- Maruja Grifell as Señorita Prefecta
- Arturo Martínez as Américo Pisaflores
- José María Linares-Rivas as Don Ramiro Martell
- Gloria Mange as Amiga de Martha, estudiante
- Pepita Morillo as Mimi
- Dámaso Pérez Prado as Self
- Los Tres Diamantes as Themselves
- Chelo La Rue as Self

== Bibliography ==
- Amador, María Luisa. Cartelera cinematográfica, 1950-1959. UNAM, 1985.
- Navitski, Rielle & Poppe, Nicolas (ed.) Cosmopolitan Film Cultures in Latin America, 1896–1960. Indiana University Press, 2017.
- Riera, Emilio García. Historia documental del cine mexicano: 1951-1952. Universidad de Guadalajara, 1992
