= Black Ace (film) =

1954 film

- Directed by: Fernando Méndez
- Written by: Fernando Méndez; Ramón Obón; Roberto Romaña
- Produced by: Antonio del Castillo
- Starring: Antonio Badú; Meche Barba; René Cardona
- Cinematography: Raúl Martínez Solares
- Edited by: Rafael Ceballos
- Music by: Sergio Guerrero
- Production company: Cinematográfica Filmex
- Distributed by: Clasa-Mohme
- Release date: 11 November 1954
- Running time: 92 minutes
- Country: Mexico
- Language: Spanish

Black Ace (Spanish: As negro) is a 1954 Mexican noir crime drama film directed by Fernando Méndez and starring Antonio Badú, Meche Barba and René Cardona. The film's sets were designed by the art director Ramón Rodríguez Granada.

== Cast ==
- Antonio Badú as Julio / Germán Acaro
- Meche Barba as Laura / Yolanda
- René Cardona as Antillano
- Carolina Barret as Flora
- Albert Carrier as El francés
- Carlos Múzquiz as Muñeco
- Lupe Legorreta as Elena
- Roberto G. Rivera as Mariachi
- Jaime González Quiñones as Julio / Germán Acaro de niño
- Víctor Alcocer as Licenciado
- Enrique del Castillo as Eduardo
- Jorge Sareli as Gerente hotel
- Fernando Fernández as Cantante

== Bibliography ==
- Alfaro, Eduardo de la Vega. Fernando Méndez, 1908-1966. Universidad de Guadalajara, 1995.
- Amador, María Luisa. Cartelera cinematográfica, 1950-1959. UNAM, 1985.
- Paranaguá, Paulo Antonio. Mexican Cinema. British Film Institute, 1995.
- Vitali, Valentina. Capital and Popular Cinema: The Dollars are Coming!. Manchester University Press, 2016.
