= Talpa (film) =

1956 film

- Directed by: Alfredo B. Crevenna
- Written by: Edmundo Báez; Juan Rulfo
- Produced by: Adolfo Lagos
- Starring: Lilia Prado; Leonor Llausás; Víctor Manuel Mendoza
- Cinematography: Rosalío Solano
- Edited by: Gloria Schoemann
- Music by: Lan Adomian
- Production company: Cinematográfica Latina
- Distributed by: Azteca Films
- Release date: 20 December 1956
- Running time: 99 minutes
- Country: Mexico
- Language: Spanish

Talpa is a 1956 Mexican drama film directed by Alfredo B. Crevenna and starring Lilia Prado, Leonor Llausás and Víctor Manuel Mendoza. It is a based on a short story by Juan Rulfo. Shot in Eastmancolor, it was made at the Churubusco Studios in Mexico City. Location shooting took place around San Pedro Cholula in Puebla. The film's sets were designed by the art directors Edward Fitzgerald and Salvador Lozano Mena. It was entered into the 1956 Cannes Film Festival.

== Synopsis ==
When his successful elder brother falls ill, a wastrel has to take over the running of the family business. This brings him into contact with his brother's wife with whom he begins an adulterous, tragic relationship.

== Cast ==
- Lilia Prado as Juana
- Leonor Llausás as La presumida
- Víctor Manuel Mendoza as Tanilo
- Jaime Fernández as Esteban
- Hortensia Santoveña as La mère
- José Chávez
- Blanca Estela Limón
- Alicia Montoya
- José Muñoz
- Aurora Walker
- Amado Zumaya

== Bibliography ==
- Amador, María Luisa. Cartelera cinematográfica, 1950-1959. UNAM, 1985.
- Riera, Emilio García. Historia documental del cine mexicano: 1955-1956. Universidad de Guadalajara, 1993
