= A Dangerous Adventure (1939 film) =

- Directed by: Ramón Peón
- Produced by: Raúl Medina
- Starring: Rosita Fornés
- Release date: 1939
- Country: Cuba
- Language: Spanish

A Dangerous Adventure (Spanish: Una aventura peligrosa) is a 1939 Cuban film directed by Ramón Peón and starring Rosita Fornés.

== Cast ==
- Juan Bux
- Aníbal de Mar as Pancrasio
- Xiomara Fernandez
- Rosita Fornés
- Julio Gallo
- Ramiro Gómez Kemp
- Sergio Miro

== Bibliography ==
- Alfonso J. García Osuna. The Cuban Filmography: 1897 through 2001. McFarland, 2003.
