= Amor de la calle =

- Directed by: Ernesto Cortázar
- Written by: Ernesto Cortázar
- Produced by: Luis Manrique
- Starring: Meche Barba; Fernando Fernández; Freddy Fernández
- Cinematography: Jack Draper
- Music by: Manuel Esperón
- Distributed by: Producciones Luis Manrique
- Release date: May 4, 1950 (México)
- Running time: 103 minutes
- Country: Mexico
- Language: Spanish

Amor de la calle (Love Street) is a 1950 Mexican drama film directed by Ernesto Cortazar and starring Meche Barba and Fernando Fernández.

== Plot ==
El Pichi (Freddy Fernández) and other street children collect a ticket that has fallen from Fernando El Calavera (Fernando Fernández), which prevents stop them and offers them a job in his place of tortas in the neighborhood of La Lagunilla Market in Mexico City. Fernando knows Queta (Meche Barba), the sister of El Pichi, and both are attracted. This will lead to Fernando namely the hardness of life of people in the suburbs. Queta have to fight against the fate, which forces her to work in a cabaret with the nickname of Cariño.

== Cast ==
- Meche Barba as Queta / Cariño
- Fernando Fernández as Fernando El Calavera
- Freddy Fernández) as El Pichi
- Esther Luquín as Mona
- Los Panchos
- Toña la Negra

== Reviews ==
With great images of American cinematographer Jack Draper, Manuel Esperon songs and musical interventions of Los Panchos and Tona la Negra, Meche Barba gets a great job on Amor de la calle, with Fernando Fernández to restart a long period as her film partner. The success of the film, led to a sequel filmed the same year: Si fuera una cualquiera (If I Were a Any), also directed by Cortázar.
