= Rafael Bertrand =

Cuban actor

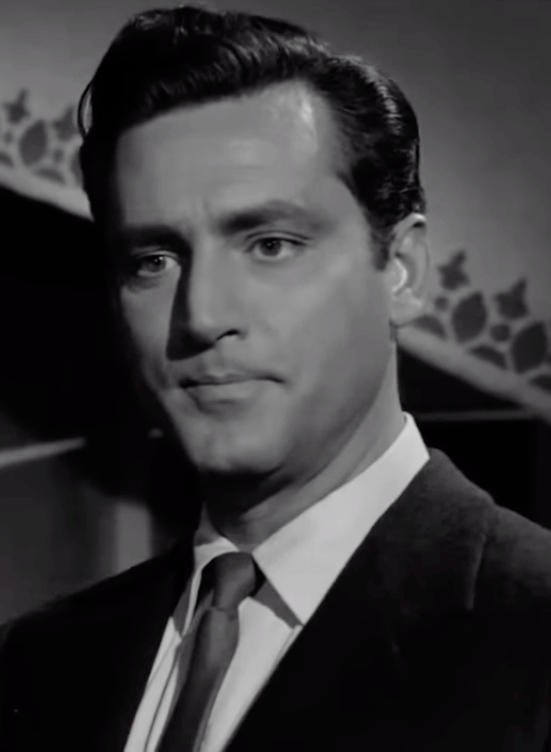
- Rafael Bertrand in 1957
- Born: Rafael Bertrand Agramonte; 20 August 1917; Camagüey, Cuba
- Died: October 5, 1983 (aged 66); Mexico City, Distrito Federal, Mexico
- Occupation: Actor
- Years active: 1945–1971

Rafael Bertrand (20 August 1917 – 5 October 1983) was a Cuban film actor who worked for many years in the Mexican film industry. He played a Mexican version of the gentleman thief A. J. Raffles in the 1958 film Raffles. He was married to the actress Dalia Íñiguez.

== Filmography ==
Year	Title	Role	Notes
1945	Sed de Amor		
1953	Mission to the North of Seoul	Clark Brown	
1954	The Viscount of Monte Cristo	Polito	
1955	Yo no creo en los hombres	Arturo Ibáñez	
1956	Corazón salvaje	Juan del Diablo	
1956	Pensión de artistas	Rafael	
1957	Tropicana		
1958	Mi desconocida esposa	Guillermo / Ricardo Aliaga	
1958	Raffles	Alejandro Robles / Humberto / Pablo	
1958	Los hijos del divorcio	Rogelio Morales	
1959	La edad de la tentación	Joaquín Menocal	
1959	Misterios de ultratumba	Dr. Mazali	
1959	800 leguas por el Amazonas (La jangada)	Torres	
1959	Siempre estaré contigo		
1960	His First Love		
1960	Puños de Roca	Puños de Roca	
1961	Vacaciones en Acapulco	Mario Martínez	
1961	El Hombre de la ametralladora	Estebán Martín Álvarez (El ingeniero)	
1961	Cuando regrese mamá	Arturo	
1961	Mañana serán hombres	Enrique Puertocarrero	
1962	Dinamita Kid	Tony Zarda	
1962	Sangre en el ring	Tony Zarda	
1963	Aventuras de las hermanas X	Don Armando	
1964	Las dos galleras		
1964	Las hijas del Zorro	Zorro	
1964	Juicio contra un ángel		
1964	Frente al destino		
1964	Las invencibles	Zorro	
1966	The Professionals	Fierro	
1971	Isle of the Snake People	Capt. Pierre Labesch	
1971	El Hacedor de Miedo	Roberto	(final film role)

== Bibliography ==
- Hardy, Phil. The BFI Companion to Crime. A&C Black, 1997.
