= Beatriz Aguirre =

Mexican actress (1925–2019)

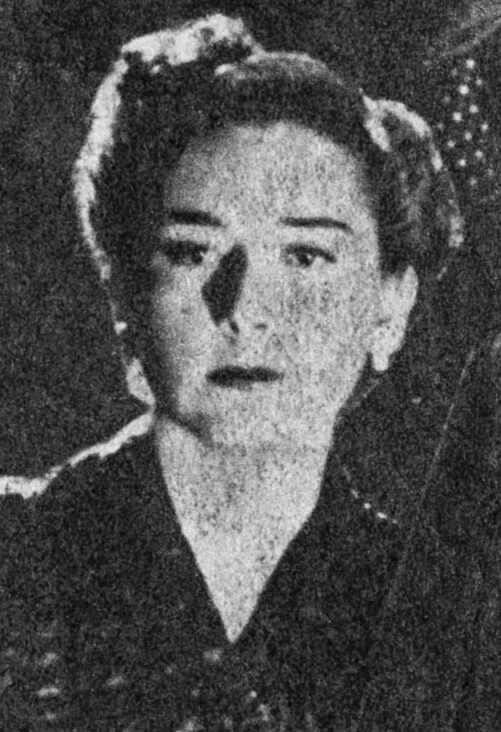
- Beatriz Aguirre in 1951
- Born: Beatriz Ofelia Aguirre Valdes; March 21, 1926; Arteaga, Coahuila, Mexico
- Died: September 29, 2019 (aged 94); Los Angeles, California, United States
- Other name: Beatriz Ofelia Aguirre Valdes
- Occupation: Actress
- Years active: 1944–2017

Beatriz Ofelia Aguirre Valdes (March 21, 1926 – September 29, 2019) was a Mexican film and television actress. She died on 29 September 2019 at the age of 94.

== Filmography ==
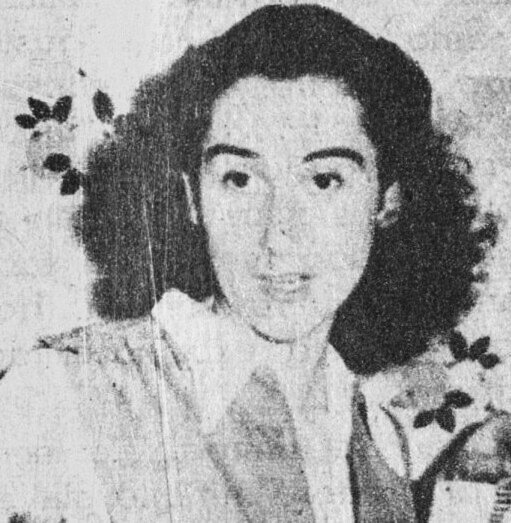
Beatriz Aguirre in 1945

Film roles
Year	Title	Role	Notes
1947	The Tiger of Jalisco	Rosita	
1949	The Perez Family	Clara	
1950	Over the Waves	Lolita	
1952	My Wife and the Other One	Alicia	
1953	Flight 971	Enfermera	
1960	My Mother Is Guilty	Lucía Arellano	
1961	One Hundred and One Dalmatians	Perdita	Voice role, Spanish dub
1981	The Fox and the Hound	Widow Tweed	Voice role, Spanish dub
1986	The Great Mouse Detective	Mrs. Judson	Voice role, Spanish dub
1996	James and the Giant Peach	Mrs. Ladybug	Voice role, Spanish dub
1997	Hercules	Hera	Voice role, Spanish dub
2000	Dinosaur	Baylene	Voice role, Spanish dub
2002	Acosada	Mamá Beba	
2004	Las pasiones de sor Juana	Doña Soledad	
2011	Los inadaptados	Anita	

Television roles
Year	Title	Role	Notes
2000	Locura de amor	Esther Sandoval	
2001	Sin pecado concebido	Salud Rojas	
2004	Corazones al límite	Victoria Antillón	
2005	Peregrina	Jueza Navarro	
2006–2007	Plaza Sésamo	Abuela	66 episodes
2008	Cuidado con el ángel	Mariana	
2011	Ni contigo ni sin ti	Miranda	

== Bibliography ==
- Hardy, Phil. The BFI Companion to Crime. A&C Black, 1997.
