= Illusion Travels by Streetcar =

La ilusión viaja en tranvía
- Poster
- Spanish: La ilusión viaja en tranvía
- Directed by: Luis Buñuel
- Written by: Luis Alcoriza
- Produced by: Armando Orive Alba
- Starring: Lilia Prado, Carlos Navarro, Fernando Soto "Mantequilla"
- Cinematography: Raúl Martínez Solares
- Edited by: Jorge Bustos
- Music by: Luis Hernández Bretón
- Distributed by: Clasa Films SA
- Release date: 18 June 1954
- Running time: 90 minutes
- Country: Mexico
- Language: Spanish

La ilusión viaja en tranvía (English: Illusion Travels by Streetcar) is a 1954 Mexican film, written by Luis Alcoriza, directed by Luis Buñuel and starring Lilia Prado, Carlos Navarro and Fernando Soto "Mantequilla".

== Plot ==
Two Mexican tram drivers are devastated that their favourite tram will be taken out of service. The pair decide to take it for "one last spin" but end up driving it around Mexico City for a day and a night.

== Cast ==
- Lilia Prado as Lupita
- Carlos Navarro as Juan Godínez 'Caireles'
- Fernando Soto "Mantequilla" as Tobías Hernández 'Tarrajas'
- Agustín Isunza as Papá Pinillos
- Miguel Manzano as Don Manuel
- Guillermo Bravo Sosa as Don Braulio
- José Pidal as El Profesor
- Felipe Montoya as Jefe del taller
- Javier de la Parra as Pablo
- Paz Villegas as Doña Mechita
- Conchita Gentil Arcos as Pasajera con santo
- Diana Ochoa as Maestra del internado
- Víctor Alcocer

== Reception ==
The film was included in the list of the Best 100 Mexican films of all time according to 25 cinema critics (1994/2020).
