= Chano Urueta =

Mexican film director, producer, screenwriter, and actor (1904–1979)

- Born: Santiago Eduardo Urueta Sierra; 24 February 1904; Cusihuiriachi, Chihuahua, Mexico
- Died: 23 March 1979 (aged 75); Mexico City, Mexico
- Occupations: Film director, screenwriter, film producer, actor
- Years active: 1928–1974

Santiago Eduardo "Chano" Urueta Sierra (24 February 1904 – 23 March 1979) was a Mexican film director, screenwriter, and actor, active in the Golden Age of Mexican Cinema. He is considered the creator of the luchador film genre, and one of the fathers of Mexican horror cinema.

== Biography ==
Urueta was born in Cusihuiriachi, Chihuahua in 1904. He was the son of Jesús Urueta, a prominent journalist, orator, politician, and one-time Ambassador to Argentina. He began his career in Hollywood in 1916, where he was part of a circle of Mexican expatriate actors and directors that notably included Emilio Fernández.

Urueta was nominated for an Ariel Award for the screenplay of his 1953 wrestling-themed film The Magnificent Beast, which is credited with initiating the popular luchador genre. He directed over 100 films between 1928 and 1974. He is also considered one of the fathers of Mexican horror cinema.

Among his acting work, Urueta appeared in two films by American director Sam Peckinpah: The Wild Bunch (1969) and Bring Me the Head of Alfredo Garcia (1974).

Urueta died in Mexico City in March of 1979, at the age of 75.

== Filmography ==
=== Director ===
- 1928: El Destino
- 1933: Profanación
- 1934: The Scandal
- 1934: Enemigos
- 1934: Una Mujer en venta
- 1935: Clemencia
- 1936: Sistemas de riego en Ciudad Delicias, Chihuahua y en Ciudad Anáhuac, Nuevo León
- 1937: Jalisco nunca pierde
- 1938: Canción del alma
- 1938: Hombres de mar
- 1938: María
- 1938: Mi candidato
- 1939: El Signo de la muerte
- 1939: The Night of the Mayas
- 1940: ¡Que viene mi marido!
- 1940: Los de abajo (The Underdogs)
- 1941: The League of Songs
- 1942: The Count of Monte Cristo
- 1943: Ave sin nido
- 1943: El Misterioso señor Marquina
- 1943: Guadalajara
- 1943: No matarás
- 1944: El Camino de los gatos
- 1944: Le Corsaire noir
- 1945: El Recuerdo de aquella noche
- 1946: El Superhombre
- 1946: La Noche y tú
- 1946: The Road to Sacramento
- 1947: Mujer
- 1948: De pecado en pecado
- 1948: The Desire
- 1948: En los altos de Jalisco
- 1948: The Flesh Commands
- 1948: Jalisco Fair
- 1948: La feria de Jalisco
- 1948: La Norteña de mis amores
- 1948: La Santa del barrio
- 1948: Se la llevó el Remington
- 1948: Si Adelita se fuera con otro
- 1949: Dos almas en el mundo
- 1949: El Abandonado
- 1949: El Gran campeón
- 1949: Don't Love Me So Much
- 1949: Rayito de luna
- 1949: Ventarrón
- 1949: Yo maté a Juan Charrasqueado
- 1950: To the Sound of the Mambo
- 1950: El Desalmado
- 1950: La Gota de sangre
- 1950: My Favourite
- 1951: From the Can-Can to the Mambo
- 1951: La estatua de carne
- 1951: Manos de seda
- 1951: Peregrina
- 1951: Serenade in Acapulco
- 1952: El Cuarto cerrado
- 1952: Mi campeón
- 1952: Música, mujeres y amor
- 1953: El Monstruo resucitado
- 1953: La Bestia magnifica (Lucha libre)
- 1953: Quiéreme porque me muero
- 1954: ¿Por qué ya no me quieres?
- 1954: La Bruja
- 1954: La Desconocida
- 1954: La Perversa
- 1954: Se solicitan modelos
- 1955: La Rival
- 1955: El Seductor
- 1955: El Túnel 6
- 1955: El Vendedor de muñecas
- 1956: La Ilegítima
- 1956: Serenata en México
- 1957: El Jinete sin cabeza
- 1957: El Ratón
- 1957: Furias desatadas
- 1957: La Cabeza de Pancho Villa
- 1957: La Marca de Satanás
- 1957: Secuestro diabólico
- 1958: El Jinete negro
- 1959: Cuando se quiere se quiere
- 1959: Del suelo no paso
- 1959: Los Hermanos Diablo
- 1959: No soy monedita de oro
- 1960: Bala perdida
- 1960: El Torneo de la muerte
- 1960: Herencia trágica
- 1960: Las Canciones unidas
- 1960: Los Tigres del ring
- 1960: Revolver en guardia
- 1960: Una Bala es mi testigo
- 1960: Fatal Vengeance
- 1961: El Hombre de la ametralladora
- 1961: Guantes de oro
- 1961: Tres Romeos y una Julieta
- 1962: Camino de la horca
- 1962: El Asaltacaminos
- 1962: Le Baron de la terreur
- 1962: El Espejo de la bruja
- 1962: Pilotos de la muerte
- 1963: La cabeza viviente
- 1963: La Muerte en el desfiladero
- 1963: Los Chacales
- 1964: Cinco asesinos esperan
- 1964: El Ciclón de Jalisco
- 1964: El Robo al tren correo
- 1964: Lupe Balazos
- 1965: Blue Demon - El demonio azul
- 1965: Especialista en chamacas
- 1966: Alma grande
- 1966: Blue Demon contra el poder satánico
- 1966: Los Gavilanes negros
- 1968: Blue Demon contra cerebros infernales
- 1968: Blue Demon contra las diabólicas
- 1968: El As de oros
- 1968: La Puerta y la mujer del carnicero
- 1973: Tu camino y el mio
- 1974: Los Leones del ring contra la Cosa Nostra
- 1974: Los Leones del ring

=== Writer or co-writer only ===
- 1972: The Incredible Professor Zovek

=== Actor ===
- 1939: Una luz en mi camino
- 1967: Chanoc - Tsekub Baloyán
- 1968: Guns for San Sebastian - Miguel
- 1969: Todo por nada - Nicolás
- 1969: The Wild Bunch - Don Jose
- 1969: Super Colt 38
- 1969: La puerta y la mujer del carnicero - Cura (segment "La mujer del carnicero")
- 1970: El capitán Mantarraya - El Hippie
- 1970: Dos esposas en mi cama
- 1970: El pueblo del terror - Álvaro
- 1970: El hermano Capulina - Padre Anselmo
- 1970: Emiliano Zapata
- 1971: The Bridge in the Jungle - Funeral Singer
- 1971: Furias bajo el cielo
- 1971: Los dos hermanos - Rulfo
- 1971: El Hacedor de Miedo - Old Priest
- 1972: Kalimán, el hombre increíble
- 1972: The Wrath of God - Antonio
- 1974: Las viboras cambian de piel - Fray Jose
- 1974: Bring Me the Head of Alfredo Garcia - Manchot, the bartender
- 1974: Once Upon a Scoundrel
- 1974: La Choca - Don Pomposo (final film role)
