= Musical Romance (1941 film) =

Cuban film directed by Ernesto Caparrós

- Directed by: Ernesto Caparrós
- Starring: Rosita Fornés
- Release date: 1941
- Country: Cuba
- Language: Spanish

Musical Romance (Spanish:Romance musical) is a 1941 Cuban film directed by Ernesto Caparrós and starring Rosita Fornés.

== Cast ==
- Esther Borja
- Aníbal de Mar
- Rosita Fornés
- Rita Montaner
- Otto Sirgo

== Bibliography ==
- Alfonso J. García Osuna. The Cuban Filmography: 1897 through 2001. McFarland, 2003.
