= Ambiciosa =

- Directed by: Ernesto Cortázar
- Written by: Mario Gracía Camberos; Edmundo Báez
- Produced by: Alfonso Rosas Priego
- Starring: Meche Barba; Fernando Fernández; Crox Alvarado
- Cinematography: Rosalío Solano
- Music by: Sergio Guerrero
- Release date: February 26, 1953 (México)
- Running time: 90 min
- Country: Mexico
- Language: Spanish

Ambiciosa (English: Ambitious) is a Mexican drama film directed by Ernesto Cortázar. It was released in 1953 starring Meche Barba and Fernando Fernández.

== Plot ==
Estela Durán (Meche Barba) is a young Cuban woman of humble origin, who lives with her nanny Mama Irene (Fedora Capdevila). Estela despises poverty. One day she meets a talent scout for a film production company in Mexico. The two strike up an affair, causing the separation of the talent scouts with his wife. Estela has no interest in formalizing with him, but only for an opportunity in film. Arriving in Mexico is related to Oscar (Crox Alvarado), one of the partners of the producer who would meet her whims to get into trouble because of the debutante. Estela is able to snatch the characters to other actresses provided to meet her target. On the set of a movie, Estela knows Manuel (Fernando Fernández), who works in the camcorder stagehand and sustains a romance, until she meets Jose Antonio (Alberto González Rubio), a millionaire who she falls in love. She tries not to hurt him away and hurt, leading to this tragedy.

== Cast ==
- Meche Barba ... Estela Durán
- Fernando Fernández ... Manuel Campos
- Crox Alvarado ... Oscar Ramírez
- Dagoberto Rodríguez ... Federico
- Alberto González Rubio ... José Antonio
- Gloria Morell ... Cristina
- Fedora Capdevila ... Mamá Irene

== Reviews ==
In Ambiciosa, Meche Barba is a young woman that climbs the ladder of the film industry through false and empty relationships. Somehow, portraying a sordid secret item and recognized in the film room. It is a curious and interesting film, made at the end of a filmography that Barba unexpectedly cut the following year. Meche Barba is amazing as a great villain in her performance, but who steals camera is the singer and actor Fernando Fernandez, who in the sequence where calls Barba for abandoning him, it does dramatically.
