= Fernando Fernández (actor) =

Mexican actor, singer and director

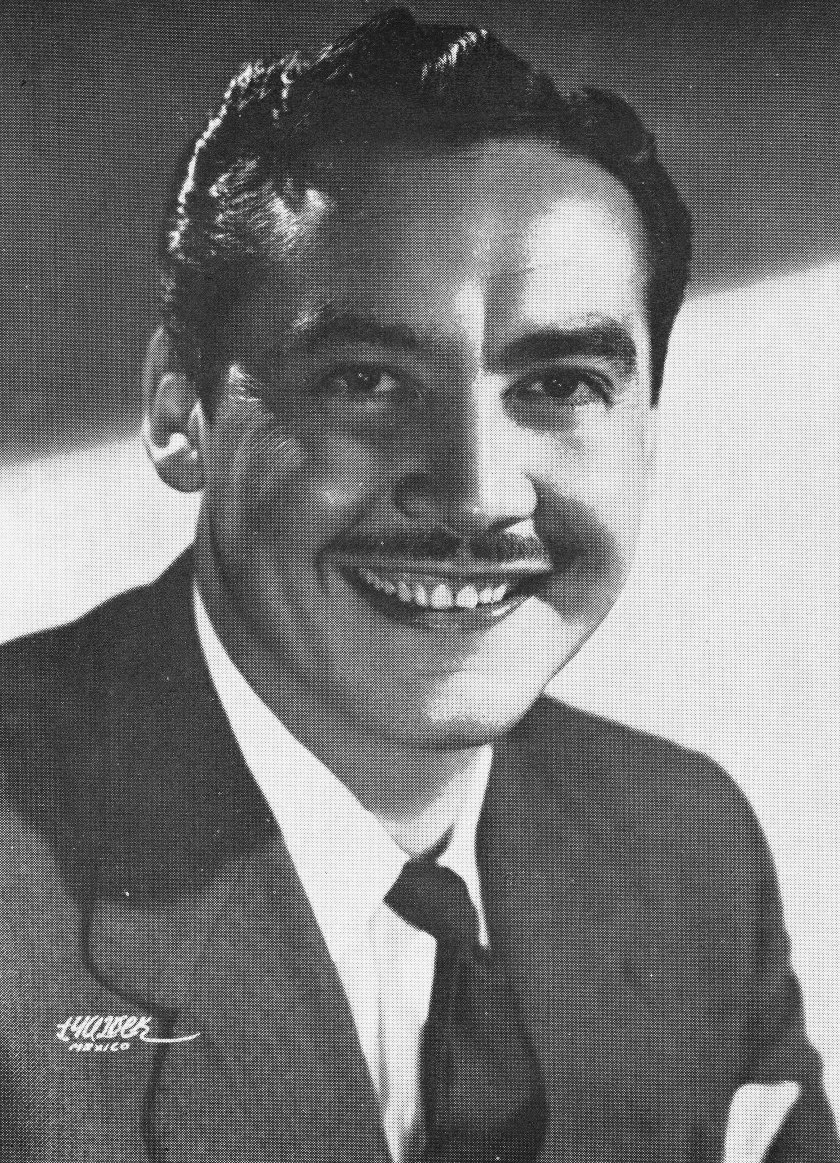
- Fernando Fernández in 1954
- Born: 9 November 1916; Monterrey, Nuevo León, México
- Died: 24 November 1999 (aged 83)
- Occupations: Singer; actor; director

Fernando Fernández "El Crooner de México" (1916–1999) was a Mexican actor, singer and director. He was born on November 9, 1916, in Monterrey, Mexico, and died in Mexico City, Mexico, on November 24, 1999. Fernando was the son of Eloisa Reyes, brother of the film director Emilio Fernández and actor Jaime Fernández, and cousin to Emilio Fernández. He was married to singer Lupita Palomera, who died in 2008. Fernando Fernández was known as "the Crooner of Mexico."

Fernández first began singing at radio station XEH in Monterrey in 1933, then moved on to radio station XEN located in Mexico City, Mexico, and then later at radio station XEB also located in Mexico City. Fernández returned to Monterrey at his father's request and became a producer at radio station XET, then worked at radio station XET in Mexico City. Fernández then spent six months working for Radio Mil Diez in Havana, Cuba.

Fernández appeared in movies such as La feria de las flores (The flower fair), Enamorada (In love) and Ambiciosa (Ambitious). He made his directing debut with El fistol del diablo.

== Selected filmography ==
- Love of The Street (1950)
- Treacherous (1950)
- Duel in the Mountains (1950)
- If I Were Just Anyone (1950)
- Arrabalera (1951)
- Love for Sale (1951)
- Passionflower (1952)
- When Children Sin (1952)
- Black Ace (1954)
- Magdalena (1955)
- The Life of Agustín Lara (1959)
- Northern Courier (1960)
