= Joaquín Pardavé =

Mexican actor and director (1900–1955)

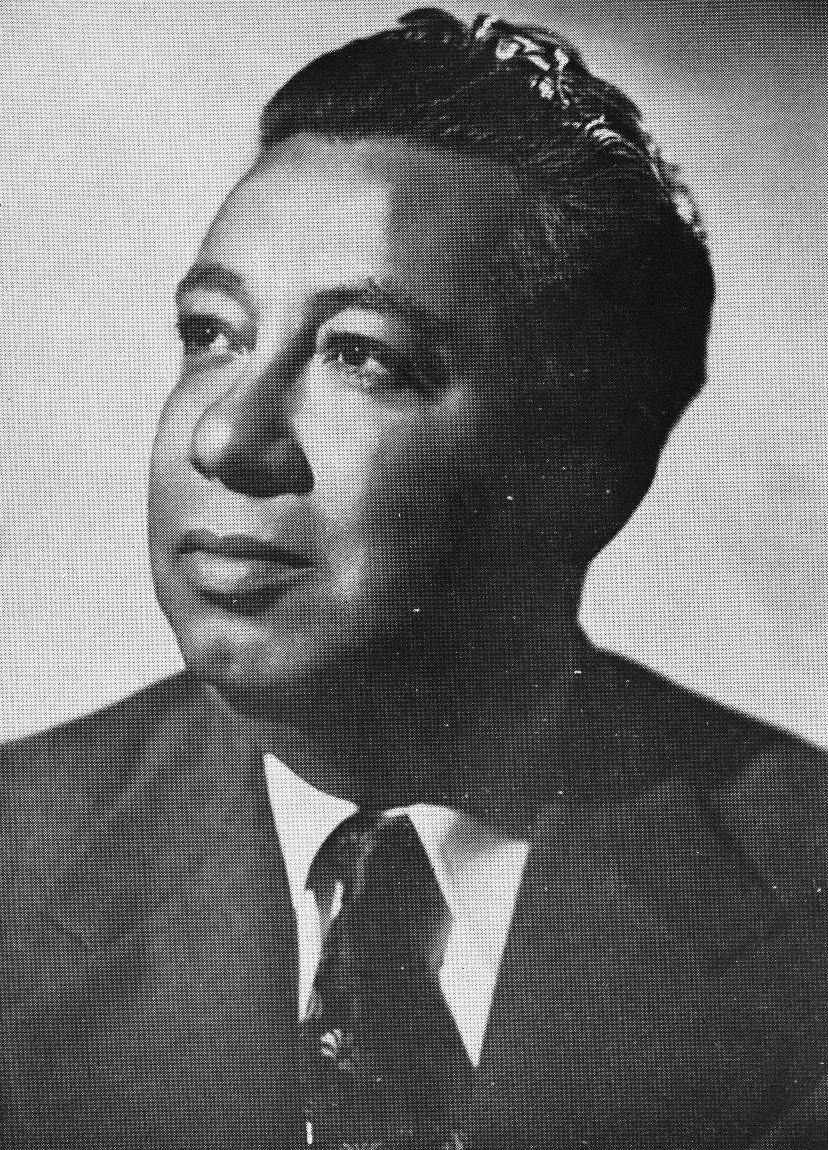
- Pardavé in 1954
- Born: Joaquín Pardavé Arce; 30 September 1900; Pénjamo, Guanajuato, Mexico
- Died: 20 July 1955 (aged 54); Mexico City, Mexico
- Occupation: Actor
- Years active: 1910–1955
- Spouse: Soledad Rebollo (m. 1925–1955)

Joaquín Pardavé Arce (30 September 1900 – 20 July 1955) was a Mexican film actor, director, songwriter and screenwriter of the Golden Age of Mexican cinema. He was best known for starring and directing various comedy films during the 1940s. In some of them, Pardavé paired with one of Mexico's most famous actresses, Sara García. The films in which they starred are El baisano Jalil, El barchante Neguib, El ropavejero, and La familia Pérez. These actors had on-screen chemistry together, and are both noted for playing a wide variety of comic characters from Lebanese foreigners to middle-class Mexicans.

== Early life ==
Pardavé was born to Spanish immigrants Joaquín Pardavé Bernal and Delfina Arce Contreras, theater actors, in Pénjamo, Guanajuato. His parents came to Mexico with the theatrical company "Betril".

After the death of his mother in 1916, Pardavé decided to settle in the city of Monterrey where he worked as a telegrapher in the Ferrocarriles Nacionales de México. There he composed the song "Carmen", dedicated to his girlfriend Carmen Delgado. Three years later, he returned to Mexico City after he learned of the death of his father.

== Career ==
=== Theatrical career ===
At age 18, Joaquín Pardavé followed in the footsteps of his parents. He began his acting career in the operetta Los sobrinos del capitán Grant, in the company of his uncle Carlos Pardavé, when he asked to meet an actor. Later he joined the company of Jose Campillo, where he met and teamed for 12 years, Roberto "Panzón" Soto. His first role in this company was in the operetta La banda de las trompetas (1920). Later he won fame in the Mexican Rataplan Journal (1925).

=== Film career ===
He started his film career in the silent film era. Pardavé's film debut was in Viaje redondo in 1919. He participated in other films such as El águila y el nopal (1929), Águilas frente al sol (1932), La zandunga (1937), La tía de las muchachas (1938), En tiempos de Don Porfirio (1939).

Juan Bustillo Oro contracted Pardavé to co-star with Cantinflas in the comedy film Ahí está el detalle (1940). In the film, Pardavé portrays "Cayetano Lastre", the rich and jealous husband of Sofía Álvarez's character Dolores del Paso. The character is later entreated to believe that Cantinflas' "pelado" character is his wife's long-lost brother, the person whom Lastre was eagerly waiting for to reclaim his wife's inheritance. Other co-stars in the film were Sara García and Dolores Camarillo. Ahí está el detalle was ranked thirty-seventh among the top 100 films of Mexican cinema.

Later in the 1940 decade, Pardavé worked in ¡Ay, qué tiempos señor don Simón! (1941) and Yo bailé con don Porfirio (1942). In 1942 he debuts as a film director with El baisano Jalil starring himself and Sara García as "Jalil and Suad Farad", Lebanese entrepreneurs settled in Mexico. Film and theater actress Sara García would soon become Pardavé's on-screen partner. Both starred in the films El barchante Neguib (1946) also as Lebanese-immigrants, El ropavejero (1947), and La familia Pérez (1949).

== Personal life ==
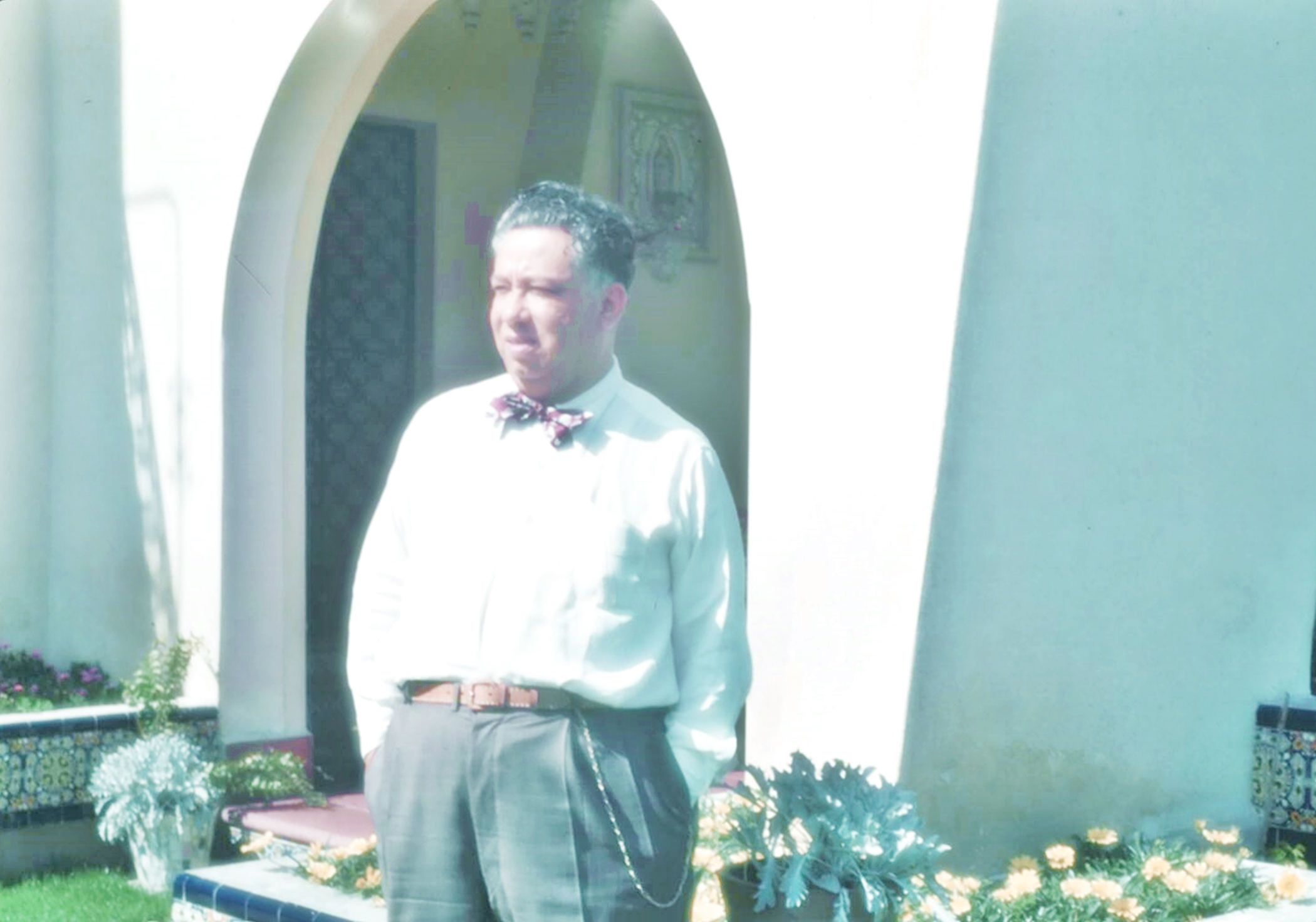
Joaquín Pardavé, in 1951, at his home Cuahtemoc and Concepcion Beistegui, in Mexico city.

In 1925, Pardavé met Soledad Rebollo, whom he married on October 26, 1925. Soledad became the love of his life and his inspiration for the songs "Plegaria", "Bésame en la boca", "Negra consentida", and "Varita de Nardo".

== Death ==
On July 20, 1955, at three-o'clock in the morning, Joaquín Pardavé died victim of a stroke caused by stress of excess of work, he was participating in two films simultaneously and in the theatrical play, Un Minuto de Parada. After his death, an urban legend started to circulate that Pardavé had been buried alive. The actor's niece María Elena Pardavé Robles confirmed that the rumor was a lie. She quoted "Joaquín Pardavé was not buried alive like many people believe. His remains have never been exhumed, not even when his wife died. She, my aunt, occupies a place in the same tomb, but my uncle's remains were never exhumed... we insist that his coffin has never been opened. That is how we categorically deny the rumors that circulate".

== Filmography ==
- La virtud desnuda (1955) as Don Zacarías Martínez
- Club de señoritas (1955) as Susanito Peñafiel
- Las medias de seda (1955) as Don Juan
- To the Four Winds (1955) as padrino
- Pueblo, canto y esperanza (1954) as padre Acisclo
- El mil amores (1954) as Chabelo
- My Darling Clementine (1953) as Don Carlos
- Penjamo (1953)
- Reportaje (1953) as robber with Arabic accent
- Pompeyo el conquistador (1953) as both Don Pompeyo and Froilán
- El casto Susano (1954) as Susano Alegre y Rematado
- Doña Mariquita de mi corazón (1952) as Ubaldo
- Ésos de Pénjamo (1952) as Dr. Porfirio Rojas
- From the Can-Can to the Mambo (1951) as Susanito
- Arrabalera (1951)
- A Galician Dances the Mambo (1951)
- Love for Sale (1951)
- Mi campeón (1951) as Chóforo Moreno
- Primero soy mexicano (1950) as Don Ambrosio
- Orange Blossom for Your Wedding (1950) as Don Bodroz
- Dos pesos dejada (1949) as Gabino Pringoso
- A Galician in Mexico (1949) as Don Robustiano
- The Perez Family (1949) as Gumaro Pérez
- Ojos de juventud (1948) as Pascual
- Los viejos somos así (1948) as Prudencio Sarasate
- The Golden Boat (1947)
- La niña de mis ojos (1946) as Curro Claveles
- El ropavejero (1946) as Cirilo
- The Operetta Queen (1946) as Margarito Pimentel
- Don Simón de Lira (1946) as Don Simón de Lira
- El barchante Neguib (1945) as Neguib
- Los nietos de don Venancio (1945) as Don Venancio Fernández
- El gran Makakikus (1944) as Narciso Escalera
- Los hijos de don Venancio (1944) as Don Venancio Fernández
- Como todas las madres (1944) as Feliciano González
- My Memories of Mexico (1944) as Don Susanito Peñafiel
- El sombrero de tres picos (1943) as Don Hermógenes de Alabastro
- Adiós juventud (1943) as Hilarión Medinilla
- Cinco fueron escogidos (1942) as Glinko
- I Danced with Don Porfirio (1942) as Don Severo de los Ríos
- El baisano Jalil (1942) as Jalil Farad
- El ángel negro (1942) as Luciano del Roble
- Esa mujer es la mía (1942) as el the false husband
- Caballería del imperio (1942) as Joaquín Abasolo
- El que tenga un amor (1942) as Simón Regalado
- Mil estudiantes y una muchacha (1941) as Atenodoro Soriano
- ¿Quién te quiere a ti? (1941) as the ugly guy
- Oh, What Times, Don Simon! (1941) as Don Simón
- Cuando los hijos se van (1941) as Casimiro
- To the Sound of the Marimba (1941) as Agapito Cuerda
- El jefe máximo (1940) as Serapio Rea
- I Will Live Again (1940) as Chufas
- Here's the Point (1940) as Cayetano Lastre
- ¡Que viene mi marido! (1939) as Valeriano
- En tiempos de don Porfirio (1939) as Don Rodrigo Rodríguez
- Three Peasants on a Donkey (1939) as Isidro Herráiz
- Horse for Horse (1939) as Espiridión Espérides
- Hombres del aire (1939) as Bigotes
- Every Madman to His Specialty (1939) as Justiniano Conquián
- El señor alcalde (1938) as el drugstore owner
- Luna criolla (1938) as stutterer
- The Girl's Aunt (1938) as Goyo Becerra
- Los millones de Chaflán (1938) as Rómulo Valdés
- Tierra brava (1938) as Benito
- La Zandunga (1937) as Don Catarino
- Mi candidato (1937) as Prócoro
- Canción del alma (1937) as Sergeant Napoleón Régules
- Jalisco nunca pierde (1937) as Filogonio
- Bajo el cielo de México (1937) as Salomón
- Revista musical (1934)
- Águilas frente al sol (1932) as Wu Li Wong
- El águila y el nopal (1929) as the rancher's nephew
- Viaje redondo (1919)
