= Dolores del Río filmography =

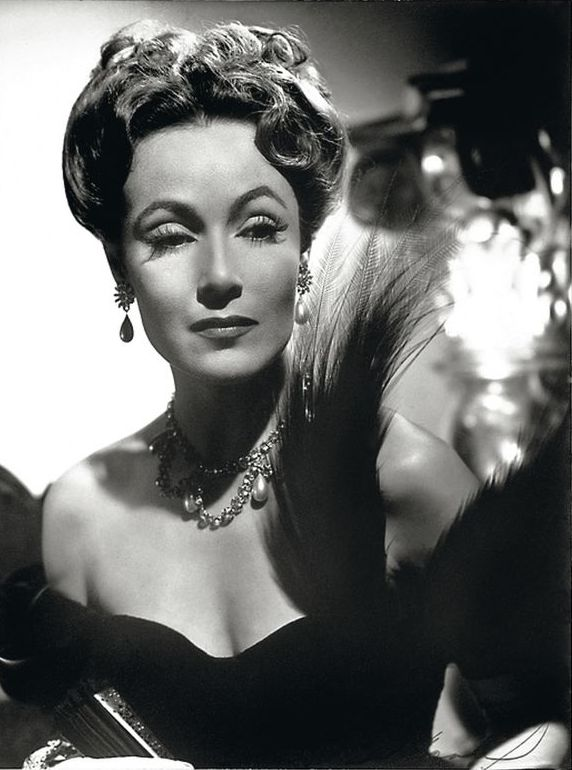

Dolores del Río (August 3, 1904 - April 11, 1983) was a Mexican actress of the 20th century, active in 53 feature films, 1 telemovies and 8 stage plays over 53 years from 1925 and 1978.

Del Río began her career in Hollywood in 1925 and made her film debut in Joanna. Over the next five decades, she appeared in a range of genres, including contemporary crime melodramas, musical films, comedies and romantic dramas.

During the 1920s, her career flourished with success in Silent films such as Resurrection (1927), Ramona (1928) and Evangeline (1929). With the advent of talkies, her Hollywood career continued through the 1930s and until 1943, in notable films such as Bird of Paradise (1932), Flying Down to Rio (1933), Madame Du Barry, Wonder Bar (1934) and Journey into Fear (1943). In 1943, del Río returned to Mexico and became in one of the most important female stars of the Golden Age of Mexican cinema. Among her most outstanding films in Mexico are Wild Flower (1943), María Candelaria (1943), Las abandonadas (1944), Bugambilia (1944) and La Malquerida (1949).

In the 1960s, del Río opted for work in stage. She starred in successful stage projects in her native country. She also participated in some American TV series. Her final appearance in a theatrically released film was a supporting role in The Children of Sanchez in 1978.

== Screen ==
Films	53
Telemovies	1
Theatre	8
TV documentaries	1

=== Feature films ===
==== 1925 – 1929 ====
Year	Title	Role	Director	Other cast members	Studio
1925	Joanna	Carlotta Da Silva	Edwin Carewe	Dorothy Mackaill, Jack Mullah	First National Pictures
1926	High Steppers	Evelyn Iffield	Edwin Carewe	Mary Astor, Lloyd Hughes, Rita Carewe	First National Pictures
1926	The Whole Town's Talking	Rita Renault	Edward Laemmle	Edward Everett Horton, Trixie Friganza	Universal
1926	Pals First	Jeanne Lammont	Edwin Carewe	Lloyd Hughes, George Cooper, Edward Earle	First National Pictures
1926	What Price Glory?	Charmaine de la Cognac	Raoul Walsh	Victor McLaglen, Edmund Lowe	Fox
1927	Resurrection	Katyusha Maslova	Edwin Carewe	Rod La Rocque, Rita Carewe, Vera Lewis	First National Pictures
1927	The Loves of Carmen	Carmen	Raoul Walsh	Victor McLaglen, Don Alvarado, Carmen Costello	Fox
1927	No Other Woman	Carmelita de Granados	Lou Tellegen	Don Alvarado, Ben Bard, Paulette Duval	Fox
1928	The Gateway of the Moon	Chela (Toni)	John Griffith Wray	Walter Pidgeon, Leslie Fenton	Fox
1928	The Trail of '98	Berna	Clarence Brown	Ralph Forbes, Tenen Holtz	MGM
1928	Ramona	Ramona	Edwin Carewe	Warner Baxter, Roland Drew	United Artists
1928	The Red Dance	Tasia	Raoul Walsh	Charles Farrell, Ivan Linow	Fox
1928	Revenge	Rascha	Edwin Carewe	James A. Marcus, Le Roy Mason	First National Pictures
1929	Evangeline	Evangeline	Edwin Carewe	Roland Drew, Alec B. Francis	United Artists

==== 1930 – 1942 ====
Year	Title	Role	Director	Other cast members	Studio
1930	The Bad One	lita	George Fitzmaurice	Edmund Lowe, Don Alvarado	United Artists
1932	Girl of the Rio	Dolores Romero	Herbert Brenon	Norman Foster, Leo Carrillo, Andrea Palma	RKO
1932	Bird of Paradise	Luana	King Vidor	Joel McCrea, John Halliday	RKO
1933	Flying Down to Rio	Belinnha de Rezende	Thornton Freeland	Gene Raymond, Fred Astaire, Ginger Rogers, Raoul Roulien	RKO
1934	Wonder Bar	Inéz	Lloyd Bacon	Al Jolson, Kay Francis, Ricardo Cortez, Dick Powell	Warner Bros.
1934	Madame Du Barry	Madame DuBarry	William Dieterle	Reginald Owen, Victor Jory	Warner Bros.
1935	In Caliente	Rita Gómez	Lloyd Bacon	Pat O'Brien, Edward Everett Horton, Glenda Farrell	Warner Bros.
1935	I Live for Love	Donna Alvarez	Busby Berkeley	Everett Marshall, Don Alvarado	Warner Bros.
1936	The Widow from Monte Carlo	Duchess of Rye	Arthur Greville Collins	Warren William, Colin Clive	Warner Bros.
1936	Accused	Gaby Seymour	Thornton Freeland	Douglas Fairbanks Jr., Florence Desmond	Criterion Films
1937	Devil's Playground	Carmen	Erle C. Kenton	Chester Morris, Richard Dix	Columbia
1937	Lancer Spy	Dolores Daria Sunnell	Gregory Ratoff	George Sanders, Peter Lorre	20th Century Fox
1937	Ali Baba Goes to Town	Brief cameo	David Butler	Eddie Cantor, Gypsy Rose Lee	20th Century Fox
1938	International Settlement	Lenore Dixon	Eugene Forde	George Sanders, John Carradine, June Lang	20th Century Fox
1940	The Man from Dakota	Eugenia Sanford	Leslie Fenton	Wallace Beery, John Howard	MGM
1943	Journey into Fear	Josette Martell	Orson Welles	Joseph Cotten, Orson Welles, Ruth Warrick, Agnes Moorehead	RKO

==== 1943 – 1959 ====
Year	Title	Role	Director	Other cast members	Studio
1943	Wild Flower	Esperanza	Emilio Fernández	Pedro Armendáriz, Emilio Fernández, Miguel Angel Ferriz	Films Mundiales
1944	María Candelaria	María Candelaria	Emilio Fernández	Pedro Armendáriz, Miguel Inclán, Alberto Galán	Films Mundiales
1945	Las Abandonadas	Margarita	Emilio Fernández	Pedro Armendáriz, Victor Junco, Arturo Soto Rangel	Films Mundiales
1945	Bugambilia	Amalia de los Robles	Emilio Fernández	Pedro Armendáriz, Julio Villarreal, Stella Inda	Films Mundiales
1945	La Selva de Fuego	Estrella	Fernando de Fuentes	Arturo de Córdova, Miguel Inclán, Luis Beristáin	Grovas
1946	La Otra	María Méndez / Magdalena Méndez	Roberto Gavaldón	Victor Junco, Agustín Irusta, José Baviera	Mercurio
1947	The Fugitive	María Dolores	John Ford	Henry Fonda, Pedro Armendáriz, Ward Bond, Leo Carrillo	RKO
1948	Story of a Bad Woman	Mrs. Erlynne	Luis Saslavsky	María Duval, Fernando Lamas, Alberto Closas	Argentina Sono Film
1949	The Unloved Woman	Raymunda	Emilio Fernández	Pedro Armendáriz, Columba Domínguez, Roberto Cañedo	Cabrera Films
1950	La casa chica	Amalia	Roberto Gavaldón	Miroslava Stern, Roberto Cañedo, Domingo Soler	FILMEX
1951	Desired	Deseada	Roberto Gavaldón	Jorge Mistral, Anabel Gutiérrez, Arturo Soto Rangel	Sansón
1951	Doña Perfecta	Doña Perfecta	Alejandro Galindo	Esther Fernández, Carlos Navarro, Julio Villarreal	Cabrera
1953	Reportaje (Episode: "The Marriage")	Maria Cristina	Emilio Fernández	Arturo de Córdova	ANDA, PECIME, Tele-Voz
1953	El Niño y la Niebla	Martha	Roberto Gavaldón	Pedro Lopez Lagar, Alejandro Ciangherotti Jr., Eduardo Noriega	Grovas
1955	Señora Ama	Dominica	Julio Bracho	José Suárez, Ma. Luz Galicia	Diana Films
1958	Where Are Our Children Going?	Rosa	Benito Alazraki	Tito Junco, Martha Mijares, Andrea Palma	FILMEX
1959	La Cucaracha	Isabel, the Widow	Ismael Rodriguez	María Félix, Emilio Fernández, Pedro Armendáriz	Películas Rodríguez

==== 1960 – 1978 ====
Year	Title	Role	Director	Other cast members	Studio
1960	Flaming Star	Neddy Burton	Don Siegel	Elvis Presley, Barbara Eden, Steve Forrest, John McIntire	20th Century Fox
1961	El Pecado de una Madre	Gabriela	Alfonso Corona Blake	Libertad Lamarque, Enrique Rambal, Pedro Geraldo	Brooks
1964	Cheyenne Autumn	Spanish Woman	John Ford	Richard Widmark, Carroll Baker, Karl Malden, Sal Mineo, Ricardo Montalbán, Gilbert Roland, James Stewart, Edward G. Robinson	Warner Bros.
1965	The Man who Bought Paradise (TV Movie)	Mona	Ralph Nelson	Buster Keaton, Paul Lukas, Angie Dickinson	CBS
1966	La Dama del Alba	La Peregrina	Francisco Robira Veleta	Juliette Villard, Yelena Samarina	Rovira Beleta
1966	Casa de Mujeres	Gilda Moreno "La Doña"	Julian Soler	Elsa Aguirre, Marta Romero, Elsa Cárdenas, Rosa María Vázquez, María Duval, Susana Cabrera	
1967	More than a Miracle	Queen Mother	Francesco Rossi	Sophia Loren, Omar Sharif	Cinecittà
1978	The Children of Sanchez	Grandma	Hall Bartlett	Anthony Quinn, Katy Jurado, Lupita Ferrer, Lucía Méndez	Bartlett, Camarel, CONACINE

=== Short subjects ===
Year	Title	Notes
1926	WAMPAS Baby Stars of 1926	
1930	Screen Snapshots Series 9, No. 14	
1930	Screen Snapshots Series 9, No. 23	
1930	Screen Snapshots Series 19, No. 24	
1935	A dream comes true: The Making of An Unusual Motion Picture	
1935	A Trip Thru a Hollywood Studio	
1937	Screen Snapshots Series 16, No. 7	
1937	Screen Snapshots Series 16, No. 8	
1939	Screen Snapshots Series 18, No. 10	
1940	Meet the Stars # 1: Chinese Garden Festival	
1941	Meet the Stars # 2: Baby Stars	
1954	Screen Snapshots: Hollywood goes to Mexico	
1967	Río Blanco	
1968	Mexico '68: Instantaneous /Dolores del Río's Mexico	
1983	Zelig	(Archive Footage)

=== Documentary ===
Year	Title	Notes
1928	Die Filmstad Hollywood	
1956	Torero!	
1961	Hollywood: The Golden Years	
1969	Hollywood: The Selznick Years	
1971	The American West of John Ford	
1976	Salsa	
1979	Mexico de mis amores	
2002	The Bronze Screen: 100 Years of the Latino Image in American Cinema	
2003	Dolores del Río: The Mexican Diva of Hollywood	
2012	Arena : Screen Goddesses	

== Television ==
Year	Title	Role	Director	Other main cast members
1951	Trio by the Lamplight		Paul Tripp	
1951	The Kate Smith Evening Hour	Herself		Kate Smith (host), Victor Borge
1957	Schlitz Playhouse of Stars; Episode : An Old Spanish Custom	Herself	John Brahm	Leon Askin, Cesar Romero
1958	The United States Steel Hour; Episode : The Public Prosecutor	Theresia Taillen	Robert Stevens	John Baragrey, Alexander Clark
1960	The Dinah Shore Chevy Show; Episode : Mexican Fiesta	Herself	Rolando Aguilar	Gilbert Roland, Ricardo Montalbán, Tito Guízar
1965	The Man who Bought Paradise	Mona	Ralph Nelson	Buster Keaton, Paul Lukas, Angie Dickinson
1966	I Spy; Episode: Return to Glory	Serita	Richard C. Sarafian	Robert Culp, Bill Cosby, Victor Jory
1966	Branded; Episode: The Ghost of Murietta	Antonia Molinera	William Witney	Chuck Connors
1966	A Bob Hope Comedy Special	Herself	Jack Shea	Bob Hope, Michael Caine, Cantinflas, Glenn Ford, Gina Lollobrigida, Jayne Mansfield, Merle Oberon, Silvia Pinal
1968	Dolores del Río (T.V BIography)	Herself	Guillermo Saldaña	
1970	Maratón Rosa Mexicano	Herself / Host		María Félix, Libertad Lamarque, Raphael, Carmen Montejo, María Elena Marqués
1970	Marcus Welby M.D. Episode: The Legacy	Carlotta Lopez de Guadalupe	Daniel Petrie	Robert Young, James Brolin, Janet Blair

== Theatre ==
Year	Play	Role	Theatre	Other notable cast members
1941	The Mercury Wonder Show	Many roles	California State Fair	Orson Welles
1956	Anastacia	Anastacia Romanov	Falmouth Playhouse, Massachusetts	Lili Darvas, Alan Shayne, Stephen Elliott, Boris Tumarin
1958	Lady Windermere's Fan	Mrs Erlynne	Teatro Virginia Fábregas, Mexico City / Teatro Nacional de Buenos Aires, Argentina	(México) María Rivas, Carlos Navarro, Joaquín Cordero, Anita Blanch, Tito Junco, (Argentina) Alberto Closas, Ana Luisa Peluffo
1959	The Road to Rome	Amitis	Teatro de los Insurgentes, Mexico City	Wolf Ruvinskis, Raúl Ramírez, Jorge del Campo, Rosenda Monteros
1961	La despedida	Herself	Million Dollar Theater, Los Angeles, California	Jorge Martínez de Hoyos
1962	Ghosts	Mrs. Helen Alving	Sala Chopin, Mexico City	Julián Soler, Adriana Roel, Jorge del Campo,
1963	Dear Liar: A Comedy of Letter	Mrs. Patrick Campbell	Teatro de los Insurgentes, Mexico City	Ignacio López Tarso
1964	La Vidente (La Voyante)	La Vidente	Teatro de los Insurgentes, Mexico City	Fernando Luján, Jacqueline Andere, Marilú Elízaga, Blanca Sánchez, Narciso Busquets, Magda Donato, Tamara Garina
1967	The Queen and the Rebels	Algira	Teatro Hidalgo, Mexico City	Ignacio López Tarso, Narciso Busquets, Patricia Morán
1970	The Lady of the Camellias	Marguerite Gautier	Teatro Hidalgo, Mexico City	Carlos Bracho, Marilú Elízaga, Germán Robles, Angélica Aragón

== Awards ==
Silver Ariel Awards
Year	Film	Result	Award	Category
1944	Las Abandonadas	Won	Silver Ariel Award	Best Actress
1946	La Otra	Nominated	Silver Ariel Award	Best Actress
1949	La Casa Chica	Nominated	Silver Ariel Award	Best Actress
1951	Doña Perfecta	Won	Silver Ariel Award	Best Actress
1953	El Niño y la niebla	Won	Silver Ariel Award	Best Actress
1975	Honorific Award	Won	Golden Ariel Award	Contribution to the Mexican Cinema

=== Honorary awards ===
Year	Award	Category
1926	WAMPAS Baby Stars	Promotional campaign sponsored by the United States Western Association of Motion Picture Advertisers, which honored thirteen young actresses each year whom they believed to be on the threshold of movie stardom.
1943	Instituto de Artes y Ciencias Cinematográficas de México	Best Actress (Flor Silvestre)
1957	Asociacion Nacional de Actores	Medal for her outstanding scenic work abroad.
1952	Neiman Marcus Fashion Award	Medal for the best dressed woman in America
1961	Hollywood Walk of Fame	Motion Pictures (Location: 1630 Vine Street)
1965	Sarape de Plata (PECIME)	Commemoration of the 50th Anniversary of the talkies in Mexico.
1967	Organization of American States	Medal for her cultural contribution to the peoples of America
1974	Diosa de Plata Award (PECIME)	Motion Pictures Contribution
1975	Mexican Legion of Honor	Diploma for artistic merit
1978	Mexican American Institute of Cultural Relations	Award for artistic merit
1982	George Eastman Award	The George Eastman Award for distinguished contribution to the art of film was established by George Eastman House
1993	The Four Ladies	The Four Ladies of Hollywood gazebo at the western border of the Hollywood Walk of Fame. The domed structure is held aloft by four caryatids sculpted by Harl West to represent the Mexican actress Dolores del Río, African-American actress Dorothy Dandridge, Asian-American actress Anna May Wong and the multi-ethnic, Brooklyn-born actress Mae West
