= Elsa Cárdenas filmography =

This article presents the filmography of Mexican actress Elsa Cárdenas. She has appeared in more than 100 films throughout her career.

== Films ==
Year	Title	Role	Notes
1954	El joven Juárez	Josefa Juárez	
1954	El jinete		Uncredited
1955	Magdalena	Elenita	
1955	Estafa de amor	Asuncion	
1956	Los margaritos	Rosalía	
1956	El médico de las locas		Uncredited
1956	Giant	Juana Guerra Benedict	as Elsa Cardenas
1956	The Brave One	Maria	
1956	Tierra de hombres	Rosita	
1957	El buen ladrón		
1957	Happiness	Ofelia	
1957	La culta dama	Eugenia Suarez	
1957	La mujer que no tuvo infancia	Luisa	
1958	Cabaret trágico	Lupe Cordova	
1958	¡Paso a la juventud..!	Elsa	
1960	For the Love of Mike	Mrs. Eagle	
1960	The Dalton That Got Away	Nanooni	as Elsie Cardenas
1961	Besito a papa	Marta	
1962	Asesinos de la lucha libre		
1962	Pueblo de odios		
1963	La fierecilla del puerto		
1963	House of the Frights	Modelo	Uncredited
1963	The Incredible Face of Dr. B	Bertha Hoffman	
1963	Los parranderos		
1963	La huella macabra	Senorita Hoffman	
1963	Of Love and Desire	Mrs. Dominguez	as Elsa Cardenas
1963	Un tipo a todo dar	Luz	
1963	Fun in Acapulco	Dolores Gomez	as Elsa Cardenas
1964	Taggart	Consuela Stark	
1965	El texano	Rosita	
1965	El pueblo fantasma	Marta	
1965	Río Hondo	Marta	
1966	La recta final	Mercedes	
1966	Juan Colorado	Isabel Ortigoza	
1966	Dos meseros majaderos	Susana	
1966	Casa de Mujeres	María, la marquesa	film also known as House of Women
1967	La isla de los dinosaurios	Esther	
1967	Los alegres Aguilares	Paulina	
1967	El camino de los espantos	Adelita	
1968	La ley del gavilán	Laura	
1968	Farewell to Marriage		
1968	Los asesinos	Linda Foster	
1968	A Wedding Night Essay		
1969	Lauro Puñales	María Elena Rodríguez	
1969	Minifaldas con espuelas		
1969	The Wild Bunch	Elsa	as Elsa Cardenas
1969	Peligro...! Mujeres en acción	S.O.S. agent in Puerto Rico	
1969	Madame Death	Julie	
1969	Santo frente a la muerte	Alicia	
1970	Santo contra los asesinos de la mafia		
1971	Teenage Tease		
1971	The Champions of Justice	Elsa	
1971	Jesús, nuestro Señor	Herodias	
1971	Santo contra la mafia del vicio	Elsa	
1971	El ídolo		
1972	The Mummies of Guanajuato	Lina	
1972	El vals sin fin	Susana Jiménez	
1973	Misión suicida	Miss Thomas	
1973	Las bestias del terror		
1973	Santo contra la magia negra	Lorna Jordan	
1974	El triunfo de los campeones justicieros	Venus	
1974	Pistolero del diablo	Betty Morgan	
1976	La ley del monte	Rosaro, esposa de Sebastián	
1981	La pachanga	Laura, Alejo's wife	
1984	Mamá, soy Paquito	Rebeca Falcon	
1984	El tonto que hacía milagros	Mama de Jaqueline	
1988	Los camaroneros		
1989	El día de las sirvientas		
1990	Viernes tragico		
1990	Un corazón para dos		
1992	Relaciones violentas		
2011	Cartas a Elena	Vieja Madrigal	

== Television shows ==
Year	Title	Role	Notes
1959	Zane Grey Theatre	Marga	Episode: Trouble at Tres Cruces

== See also ==
- Elsa Cárdenas
