= List of Mexican films of 1962 =

A list of the films produced in Mexico in 1962 (see 1962 in film):

== 1962 ==
Title	Director	Cast	Genre	Notes
1962
El ángel exterminador	Luis Buñuel	Silvia Pinal, Enrique Rambal, Claudio Brook, Jacqueline Andere		Entered into the 1962 Cannes Film Festival
Le Baron de la terreur	Chano Urueta	Abel Salazar, Ariadne Welter, David Silva, Germán Robles		
Pueblito	Emilio Fernández	Columba Domínguez, María Elena Marqués		
La Bandida	Roberto Rodríguez	María Félix, Pedro Armendáriz, Emilio Fernández, Katy Jurado		Screened at the 23rd Venice International Film Festival
El tejedor de milagros	Francisco del Villar	Pedro Armendáriz, Columba Domínguez		Entered into the 12th Berlin International Film Festival
El pecado de una madre	Alfonso Corona Blake	Dolores del Río, Libertad Lamarque		
Pilotos de la muerte	Chano Urueta	Tin Tan, Resortes, Tere Velázquez, Lorena Velázquez, Kitty de Hoyos		
Santo vs. las Mujeres Vampiro	Alfonso Corona Blake	Santo, Lorena Velázquez	Horror	
Tlayucan	Luis Alcoriza	Andres Soler, Anita Blanch		Academy Award nominated
Twist locura de juventud	Miguel M. Delgado	Enrique Guzmán, Rosita Arenas, María Eugenia San Martín, Carmen Molina, Alejandro Ciangherotti, Freddy Fernández		
El vampiro sangriento	Miguel Morayta	Bertha Moss	Horror	
Boy or Girl?	Antonio del Amo			
El malvado Carabel		Sara García		
El misterio de Huracán Ramírez	Joselito Rodríguez	David Silva, Tonina Jackson, Carmelita González, Titina Romay, Freddy Fernández		
Las hijas del Amapolo		José Elías Moreno, Sara García		
Qué perra vida	Jaime Salvador	Marco Antonio Campos, Gaspar Henaine, Norma Mora		
Romance in Puerto Rico	Ramón Pereda	María Antonieta Pons, Dagoberto Rodríguez		
Ruletero a toda marcha		Eulalio González, María Duval, Norma Angélica Ladrón de Guevara, Sara García		
The Extra	Miguel M. Delgado	Cantinflas, Alma Delia Fuentes		
The Gang of Eight	Tulio Demicheli			
The Rape of the Sabine Women	Alberto Gout	Lorena Velázquez, Tere Velázquez, Wolf Ruvinskis		
Tom Thumb and Little Red Riding Hood	Roberto Rodríguez	José Elías Moreno, Manuel Valdés, Ofelia Guilmáin		
Ánimas Trujano	Ismael Rodríguez	Toshiro Mifune, Columba Domínguez, Flor Silvestre, Antonio Aguilar		Nominated for an Academy Award for Best Foreign Language Film
