= Commander USA's Groovie Movies =

American movie showcase series

- Commander USA
- Genre: Comedy; Variety
- Written by: Jim Hendricks
- Starring: Jim Hendricks
- Country of origin: United States
- Original language: English

Original release
- Network: USA Network
- Release: 1985 – 1989

Commander USA's Groovie Movies is an American movie showcase series that ran weekend afternoons on the USA Network.

The show premiered January 5, 1985 and ran through 1989. It was hosted by Jim Hendricks as "Commander USA", a wacky but slightly seedy blue-collar comic book superhero who occasionally displayed powers such as "microwave vision" (usually to prepare a mid-movie meal of fish or eggs).

== Overview ==
The show originally ran double features of horror and science fiction movies on Saturday afternoons, then later a single feature on Sunday afternoons. Later movies on the show tended to be Mexican wrestling films or heavily edited violent films from Japan.

The Commander's show originated from a secret headquarters located under a New Jersey shopping mall. The Commander was almost always enthusiastic about the films he showed, whether it was a "gem" like Inframan, Blood Beast Horror, or any other number of Grade-Z celluloid oddities. The Commander was often joined on the program by either his agent (Barry Kluger) or "Lefty", a hand puppet created by drawing a face on his right hand with cigar ash. Over the course of a show, Lefty's face would inevitably get smeared or washed off, but the Commander would always redraw it with his unlit cigar.

In 1988, Eclectic Publishing published Commander USA's World of Horror, a 32-page magazine which was intended to be published bi-monthly, but only one issue was ever released.

In all, more than 200 episodes were produced.

== Movies shown ==
- The Abominable Snowman
- The Alligator People
- Animal Crackers
- Alone in the Dark
- An American Werewolf in London
- The Aztec Mummy
- Bedlam
- Beginning of the End
- Black Carrion
- The Black Cat
- Blood and Roses
- Bloodbath at the House of Death
- The Blood Beast Terror
- The Blood of Nostradamus
- Blood Song
- The Bloody Vampire
- The Brainiac
- The Brood
- The Brute Man
- Bug
- Captain Kronos – Vampire Hunter
- Cat People
- Cave of the Living Dead
- The Children
- Child's Play
- C.H.U.D.
- The Contraption
- The Corvini Inheritance
- Countess Dracula
- The Crawling Eye
- The Creature Wasn't Nice
- Cry Wolf
- The Curse of Frankenstein
- Curse of Nostradamus
- Curse of the Aztec Mummy
- The Curse of the Cat People
- The Curse of the Crying Woman
- The Curse of the Doll People
- The Playgirls and the Vampire
- Dance of the Dwarfs
- Dark Forces
- The Day Mars Invaded Earth
- The Death Kiss
- The Death of Bruce Lee
- Demonoid
- The Devil Bat
- Devil Bat's Daughter
- The Devil's Gift
- The Devil's Nightmare
- Doctor of Doom
- Dracula
- Exorcism at Midnight
- The Final Terror
- The Flying Serpent
- Frankenstein and the Monster from Hell
- Frankenstein Must Be Destroyed
- Fräulein Doktor
- Friday the 13th
- Friday the 13th Part 2
- Friday the 13th Part III
- Gamera vs. Barugon
- Genii of Darkness
- God Told Me To
- The Hearse
- Hercules in New York
- The Hills Have Eyes Part II
- Horror of the Blood Monsters
- Horror of the Zombies
- Horror Planet a.k.a. Inseminoid
- House of Psychotic Women
- House of the Long Shadows
- The House of 1,000 Dolls
- The House Where Evil Dwells
- I Married a Monster from Outer Space
- I Walked with a Zombie
- Infra-Man
- In Search of Dracula
- The Invasion of the Vampires
- Island Claws
- The Island Monster
- It's Alive
- J. D.'s Revenge
- Kingdom of the Spiders
- Land of the Minotaur
- Las Vegas Weekend
- Laserblast
- The Late Nancy Irving
- Let's Scare Jessica to Death
- Little Mad Guy
- The Little Shop of Horrors
- The Living Coffin
- The Living Head
- The Loch Ness Horror
- Mako: The Jaws of Death
- The Man and the Monster
- The Man and the Snake
- The Man With the Synthetic Brain
- Mark of the Devil
- Mark of the Vampire
- Mausoleum
- The Monster Demolisher
- Monster in the Closet
- My Bloody Valentine
- Night of the Creeps
- Pandemonium
- Panic
- The Pied Piper
- A Polish Vampire in Burbank
- The Possession of Joel Delaney
- Princess of the Nile
- The Premonition
- Psychophobia
- The Psychotronic Man
- One Dark Night
- Q, the Winged Serpent
- Rabid
- The Robot vs. the Aztec Mummy
- Samson vs. the Vampire Woman
- Samson in the Wax Museum
- Satanik
- Savage Sisters
- Scared to Death
- Shanghai Massacre
- Simon, King of the Witches
- The Space Children
- Stranglehold
- Student Bodies
- Swamp of the Lost Monster
- Tales That Witness Madness
- Taste the Blood of Dracula
- The Terror
- They Still Call Me Bruce
- Three in the Attic
- Trick or Treats
- Toxic Zombies
- Undersea Kingdom
- The Unseen
- Up in the Cellar
- The Vampire
- The Vampire Bat
- Vampire Circus
- The Vampire's Coffin
- What?
- What's Up, Tiger Lily?
- The Witchmaker
- The Witch's Mirror
- Woman Who Came Back
- Women in Chains
- World of the Vampires
- Zorro's Black Whip
