= El Santo filmography =

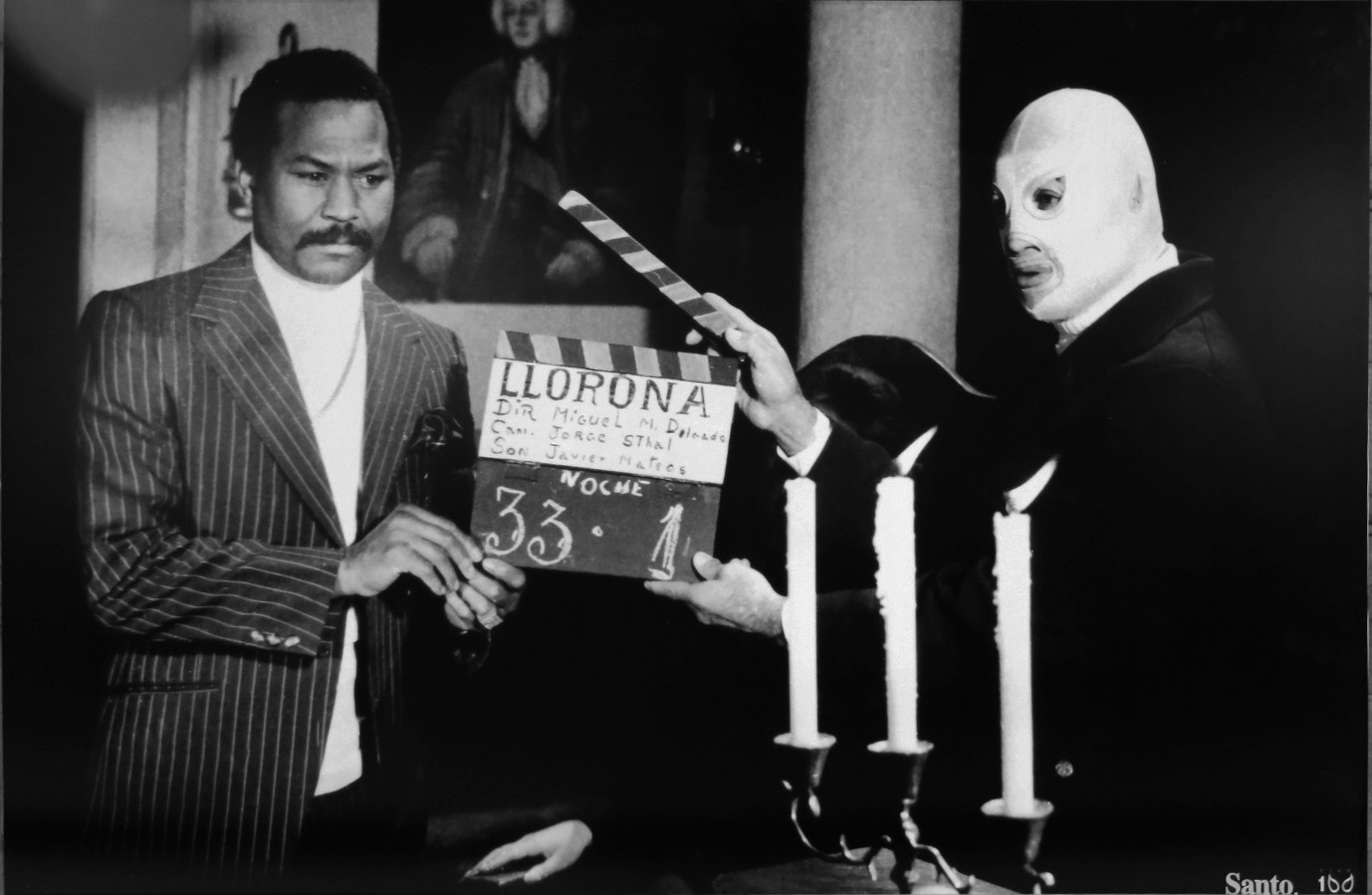
El Santo (right) with Mantequilla Nápoles during the filming of Santo en la venganza de la Llorona (1974)

El Santo ("The Saint") was a luchador enmascarado ("masked professional wrestler") who portrayed a fictionalized version of himself in numerous luchador films from 1961 to 1984.

It is unclear as to the exact date when Santo (real name Rodolfo Guzmán) made his professional wrestling debut, but by the end of the 1930s, he was an established wrestler and had worked under a variety of ring names and gimmicks both masked and unmasked. One of these aliases was Murciélago Enmascarado II ("The Masked Bat II"), with the implication that he was related to the original Murciélago Enmascarado, and after Murciélago made a complaint to a wrestling commission, Guzmán was barred from using that name. After losing the ability to use the Murciélago name, Guzmán's manager wanted him to be part of a new group of masked wrestlers debuting in 1942, all dressed in silver. Guzmán chose the Santo persona, and was often referred to as El Enmascarado de Plata ("The Man in the Silver Mask"). Ten years later, Santo was a beloved household name, despite being a rudo ("bad guy wrestler" or "heel"), and he was asked by José G. Cruz to star in a television serial named El Enmascarado de Plata, in order to capitalise on his popularity and change his image into that of a técnico ("good guy wrestler" or "face"). Santo declined as he feared that it would not be a commercial success. This saw a late casting change as Médico Asesino, a wrestler who wore a white mask similar to Santo's, was now the lead, and the title of the serial began to refer to the villain. The serial's villain (portrayed by Médico Asesino) was originally intended to be its hero and would have been portrayed by Santo. The serial did become a success, which convinced Santo to make his first foray into film, although he would be portraying the masked sidekick character El Enmascarado, alongside Fernando Osés who portrayed the hero, a masked detective named El Incognito. El Cerebro del Mal ("The Evil Brain") and Hombres Infernales ("The Infernal Men") were filmed in Cuba, but due to the Cuban Revolution, they failed to find a distributor. With the success of Santo Contra los Zombies ("Santo vs. the Zombies"), in which Santo played a fictionalized version of himself, the producers of El Cerebro del Mal and Hombres Infernales were able to release their films by rebranding them under the Santo name instead.

Many of the luchador films Santo starred in were low-budget and often had similar storylines, in which Santo would fight characters from the science fiction and horror genres of the time. They were also quickly produced, so it was not uncommon for there to be several Santo films in a single year. Santo would appear in a number of films with his in-ring rival Blue Demon, and then later, with Mil Máscaras. In fact, it was because of a contract dispute involving Santo and an injury to Blue Demon, that resulted in the rise of Máscaras, then a lesser known luchador enmascarado, who would become famous through his own series of films. Las momias de Guanajuato ("The Mummies of Guanajuato"), released in 1970 and co-starring Blue Demon and Máscaras, became Santo's most financially successful film. Blue Demon invited him to star in the multi-luchador film Los Campeones Justicieros ("The Champions of Justice"), but Santo turned him down as he was too busy making other films to participate. As luchador films fell out of fashion during the 1970s, Santo's appearances in them dwindled and his final film credit was in 1982, two years before his death.

Santo's legacy within luchador films lived on through his son, El Hijo del Santo ("The Son of the Saint"), who portrayed him in the 1993 biopic Santo: la leyenda del enmascarado de plata ("Santo: The Legend of the Man in the Silver Mask"), as well as in the 2001 film Infraterrestre ("Inside Earth"), a revival of the Santo film series. The Santo character has appeared in numerous films not authorized by Rodolfo Guzmán or his family, including the Turkish film 3 Dev Adam ("Three Giant Men") and the Canadian film Jesus Christ Vampire Hunter among others.

== Filmography ==
Year	Title	Role	Notes
1961	Santo contra el cerebro del mal ("Santo vs. the Evil Brain")	El Enmascarado	Filmed in 1958 and later branded as a Santo movie, despite El Santo portraying a different character
1961	Santo contra hombres infernales ("Santo vs. the Infernal Men")	El Enmascarado	Filmed in 1958 and later branded as a Santo movie, despite El Santo portraying a different character
1961	Santo Contra los Zombies ("Santo vs. the Zombies")	El Santo	Also known as Invasion of the Zombies; One of the four Santo films that were dubbed in English during his lifetime
1961	Santo contra el rey del crimen ("Santo vs. the King of Crime")	El Santo	
1961	Santo en el hotel de la muerte ("Santo in the Hotel of Death")	El Santo	
1962	Santo contra el cerebro diabolico ("Santo vs. the Diabolical Brain")	El Santo	
1962	Santo contra las mujeres vampiro ("Santo vs. The Vampire Women")	El Santo	Also known as Samson vs. the Vampire Women; One of the four Santo films that were dubbed in English during his lifetime
1963	Santo en el museo de cera ("Santo in the Wax Museum")	El Santo	Also known as Samson in the Wax Museum; One of the four Santo films that were dubbed in English during his lifetime
1963	Santo contra el estrangulador ("Santo vs. the Strangler")	El Santo	
1963	Santo contra el espectro del estrangulador ("Santo vs. the Ghost of the Strangler")	El Santo	
1964	Blue Demon contra el poder satánico ("Blue Demon vs. Satanic Power")	El Santo	Cameo appearance
1964	Santo en Atacan las brujas ("Santo in The Witches Attack")	El Santo	Also known as Santo en la casa de las brujas
1964	Santo en el hacha diabólica ("Santo in The Diabolical Axe")	El Santo	
1965	Santo en los profanadores de tumbas ("Santo in The Grave Robbers")	El Santo	
1965	Santo en el Barón Brakola ("Santo in Baron Brakola")	El Santo	
1966	Santo contra la invasión de los marcianos ("Santo vs. the Martian Invasion")	El Santo	
1966	Santo contra los villanos del ring ("Santo vs. the Villains of the Ring")	El Santo	Santo's last B&W film
1966	Santo en Operación 67 ("Santo in Operation 67")	El Santo	Santo's first color film
1967	Santo en el tesoro de Moctezuma ("Santo in The Treasure of Montezuma")	El Santo	
1968	Santo en el tesoro de Drácula ("Santo in The Treasure of Dracula")	El Santo	Also known as The Vampire and Sex (a separate adult-rated version)
1968	Santo contra Capulina ("Santo vs. Capulina")	El Santo	
1969	Santo contra Blue Demon en la Atlántida ("Santo vs. Blue Demon in Atlantis")	El Santo	
1969	Santo y Blue Demon contra los monstruos ("Santo and Blue Demon vs. the Monsters")	El Santo	
1969	Santo y Blue Demon en el mundo de los muertos ("Santo and Blue Demon in the World of the Dead")	El Santo	
1969	Santo contra los cazadores de cabezas ("Santo vs. the Headhunters")	El Santo	
1969	Santo frente a la muerte ("Santo Faces Death")	El Santo	Also known as Santo vs. the Mafia Killers
1970	Santo contra los jinetes del terror ("Santo vs. the Terror Riders")	El Santo	Also known as The Lepers and Sex (a separate adult-rated version)
1970	Santo en la venganza de las mujeres vampiro ("Santo in "The Revenge of the Vampire Women")	El Santo	
1970	Santo contra la mafia del vicio ("Santo vs. the Mafia of Vice")	El Santo	Also known as Mission Sabotage
1970	Santo en la venganza de la momia ("Santo in The Mummy's Revenge")	El Santo	
1970	Las momias de Guanajuato ("The Mummies of Guanajuato")	El Santo	
1971	Santo en el misterio de la perla negra ("Santo in The Mystery of the Black Pearl")	El Santo	Also known as The Caribbean Connection; Released in Spain in 1971, but not released in Mexico until 1975
1971	Santo contra la hija de Frankenstein ("Santo vs. Frankenstein's Daughter")	El Santo	
1971	Santo en misión suicida ("Santo in Suicide Mission")	El Santo	
1971	Santo contra los asesinos de otros mundos ("Santo vs. the Killers from Other Worlds")	El Santo	Also known as Santo vs. the Living Atom
1971	Santo y el tigresa en el aguila real ("Santo and the Tigress in The Royal Eagle")	El Santo	
1972	Santo y Blue Demon contra Drácula y el Hombre Lobo ("Santo and Blue Demon vs. Dracula and the Wolf Man")	El Santo	
1972	Santo contra los secuestradores ("Santo vs. the Kidnappers")	El Santo	
1972	Santo contra la magia negra ("Santo vs. Black Magic")	El Santo	
1972	Santo y Blue Demon en las bestias del terror ("Santo and Blue Demon in The Beasts of Terror")	El Santo	
1972	Santo contra las lobas ("Santo vs. the She-Wolves")	El Santo	
1972	Santo en Anónimo mortal ("Santo in Anonymous Death Threat")	El Santo	
1972	Santo y Blue Demon contra el doctor Frankenstein ("Santo and Blue Demon vs. Dr. Frankenstein")	El Santo	
1972	El Sabado del Santo ("Saturday of Santo")	El Santo	Television series Unknown number of episodes
1973	Santo contra el doctor Muerte ("Santo vs. Dr. Death")	El Santo	Also known as Santo Strikes Again and The Masked Man Strikes Again; One of the four Santo films that were dubbed in English during his lifetime
1974	Santo en la venganza de la llorona ("Santo in The Revenge of the Crying Woman")	El Santo	
1975	Santo en Oro negro ("Santo in Black Gold")	El Santo	Also known as La Noche de San Juan
1976	México de mis amores ("Mexico of my Loves")	El Santo	Documentary; Archival footage
1977	Santo en el Misterio en las Bermudas ("Santo in The Bermuda Mystery")	El Santo	
1979	Santo en la frontera del terror ("Santo in The Border of Terror")	El Santo	Also known as Santo vs. the White Shadow
1981	Santo contra el asesino de televisión ("Santo vs. the TV Killer")	El Santo	
1981	Chanoc y el hijo del Santo contra los vampiros asesinos ("Chanoc and the Son of Santo vs. the Killer Vampires")	El Santo	Cameo appearance
1982	Santo en el puño de la muerte ("Santo in The Fist of Death")	El Santo	
1982	Santo en la furia de los karatekas ("Santo in The Fury of the Karate Experts")	El Santo	
1984	Contrapunto ("Counterpoint")	El Santo	Talk show At least 1 episode Final media appearance, unmasked on the show
