= Alberto Vázquez (singer) =

Mexican singer and actor (born 1940)

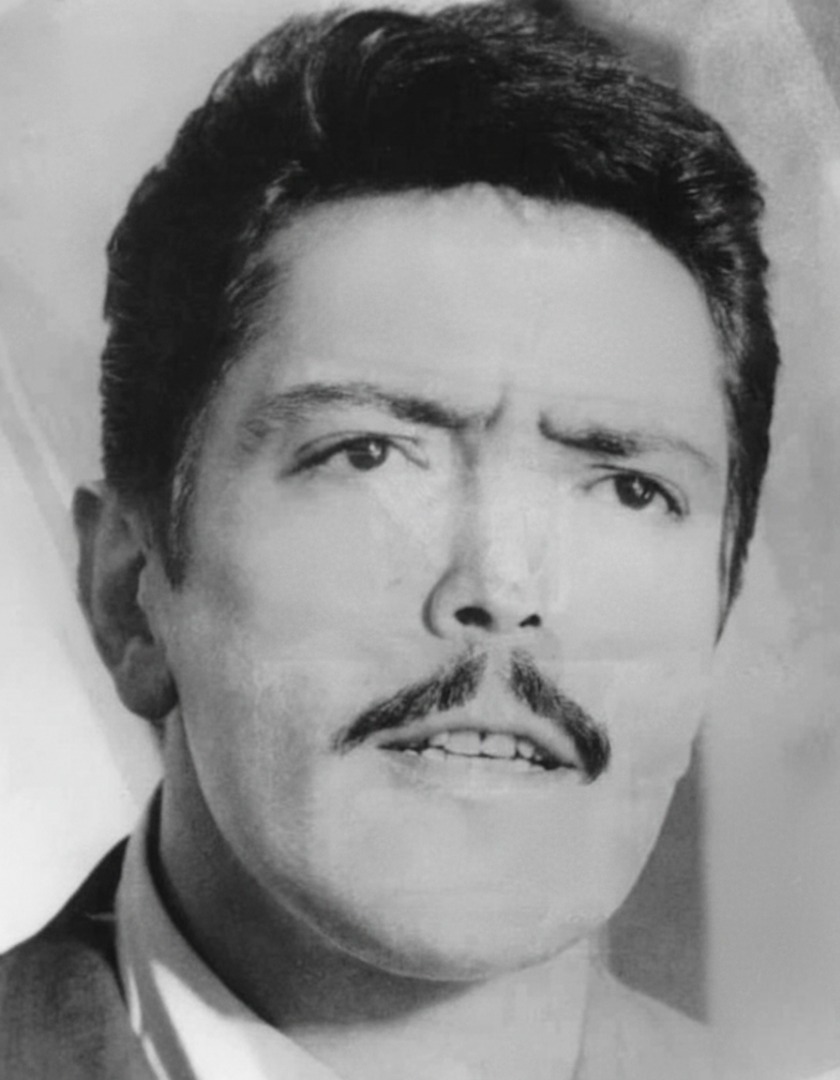
Alberto Vázquez in 1975

Alberto Vázquez Gurrola (born Guaymas, 20 April 1940) is a Mexican singer and actor, specialized in the musical genres of ranchera and romantic ballad, and from part of the golden age generation of rock and roll in Mexico.

He had a son, Arturo Vazquez, who also became a singer, with actress Isela Vega, but the couple never married.

== Discography ==
- Ritmos Juveniles (LP, album) Musart D697 1962
- Alberto Vázquez (LP, album) Musart D 781 1963
- Alberto Vázquez Vol. 3 (LP, album) Musart D 893 1964
- Baladas Bailables (LP, album) Musart D 1014 1964
- Alberto Vázquez Vol. 4 (LP, album) Musart D 975 1964
- Nuevos Éxitos de Alberto Vázquez (LP, album) Musart D 1140. 1965
- El Estilo Ranchero De Alberto Vazquez (LP) Musart 1410 1968
- El Amor Es Triste (LP, album) Musart D 1375 1968
- El Estilo Ranchero De Alberto Vazquez Vol. 2 (LP) Musart ED 1455 1969
- Alberto Vazquez (3xLP, album) Musart DC 1488 1970
- Soñando Con El Amor (LP) Musart, Musart 1520, ED 1520 1971
- Rancheras De Exito (LP) Musart 1577 1972
- Alberto Vazquez (LP) Gas Records 4079 1973
- Rock (LP) Trebol Records T 10476 1974
- Rock Y Baldas Con Alberto Vazquez (LP) Discos Gas 1018 1974
- Perla Negra, Alberto Vazquez - Perla Negra (LP) Gas Records (6) 4071 1975
- Las Dos Caras De Alverto Vazquez (15 Super Exitos) (LP, album) Telediscos DAL 1024 1982
- Alberto Vázquez (LP, album) Musart CDN 522 1988
- Cosas de (CD, album) Epic CDDE 479928 1994
- Ven Amorcito, Ven (LP) Musart DM 1276
- Amorosa (LP, album) Pan Americana De Discos, S.A. PALP 619
- Rancheras Romanticas (LP, album) Gas 4129 (1975) Discos Gas, S.A.
- Como No Creer... (LP, album) GAS 4200 (1978)

== Filmography ==
- A ritmo de twist, directed by Benito Alazraki, 1962
- La edad de la violencia, 1964
- Un callejón sin salida, 1964
- Luna de miel para nueve, 1964
- Perdóname mi vida, 1965
- Santo contra el estrangulador, 1965
- La alegría de vivir, 1965
- Lanza tus penas al viento, with Fernando Luján, 1966
- Serenata en noche de luna, with Gina Romand, 1967
- Me quiero casar, with Angélica María, 1967
- Caballos de acero, with Fernando Luján, 1967
- Vestidas y alborotadas, 1968
- Patrulla de valientes, 1968
- Romeo contra Julieta, with Angélica María, Fernando Soler and Eduardo López Rojas, 1968
- Cuando los hijos se van, with Fernando and Andrés Soler, 1968
- Faltas a la moral, 1970
- Pancho Tequila, 1970
- Jóvenes de la Zona Rosa, 1970
- Un amante anda suelto, 1970
- Águilas de acero 1971, with José Galvez, Nadia Milton, and Rodolfo de Anda
- Nido de fieras, 1971
- Caín, Abel y el otro, with Enrique Guzmán, César Costa, Lorena Velázquez and Germán Valdés, 1971
- Ni solteros, ni casados, 1972
- Mi niño Tizoc, produced by Ismael Rodríguez, 1972
- Pilotos de combate, 1973
- Ni solteros, ni cazados, 1980
- Amor a navaja libre, with Pedro Weber "Chatanuga", 1982

Telenovelas

- Nosotros los pobres, 1973
- Agujetas de color de rosa, 1994
- El secreto, as Alberto, 2001
