= Dos hijos desobedientes =

1960 film by Jaime Salvador

- Directed by: Jaime Salvador
- Screenplay by: Jaime Salvador
- Story by: Jaime Salvador
- Produced by: Emilio Gómez Muriel
- Starring: Pedro Armendáriz; Antonio Aguilar; Elvira Quintana; María Duval
- Cinematography: Jack Draper
- Edited by: Jorge Bustos
- Music by: Gustavo César Carrión
- Production company: Producciones Corsa
- Release date: 17 March 1960 (Mexico)
- Country: Mexico
- Language: Spanish

Dos hijos desobedientes (English: "Two Disobedient Sons") is a 1960 Mexican Western musical comedy film directed by Jaime Salvador and starring Pedro Armendáriz, Antonio Aguilar, Elvira Quintana and María Duval.

The film's sets were designed by art director Jesús Bracho.

== Plot ==
Two brothers fight to buy a ranch, but the new owners are two young women with whom they fall in love. To buy the ranch and be able to marry them, they must learn to control their behavior.

== Cast ==
- Pedro Armendáriz as Pedro
- Antonio Aguilar as Toño
- Elvira Quintana as Elvira
- María Duval as María
- José Elías Moreno as Father Mariano
- Jaime Fernández as Carmelo's Son
- Armando Soto La Marina as Chicote (as Armando Soto Lamarina "El Chicote")
- Federico Curiel as Fidencio (as Federico Curiel "Pichirilo")
- Joaquín García Vargas as Bartolo (as Joaquin Garcia Vargas "Borolas")
- Amparo Arozamena as Doña Catalina
- José Eduardo Pérez as Carmelo's Son
- José Jasso as Contest Judge
- Manuel Arvide as Don Carmelo (uncredited)
- Felipe de Flores (uncredited)
- José Luis Fernández as Carmelo's Henchman (uncredited)
- Salvador Lozano as Attorney (uncredited)
- Roberto Meyer as Mayor (uncredited)
- José Luis Moreno as Man Beaten at Party (uncredited)
- Ángela Rodríguez as Pedro's Female Friend (uncredited)
- Mario Sevilla as Don Leoncio (uncredited)

== Production and release ==
The film was shot in 1958. It was released on 17 March 1960 on the Olimpia cinema, for four weeks.
