= Martín Romero El Rápido =

- Directed by: Jaime Salvador
- Written by: Jaime Salvador
- Starring: Fernando Casanova; Armando Silvestre; María Duval; Ofelia Montesco
- Release date: 1966
- Running time: 87 minute
- Country: Mexico
- Language: Spanish

Martín Romero El Rápido is a 1966 Mexican western drama film written and directed by Jaime Salvador, and starring Fernando Casanova, Armando Silvestre, María Duval and Ofelia Montesco.

== Cast ==
- Fernando Casanova as Martín Romero
- Armando Silvestre as El Cuervo
- María Duval as Andrea Garza
- Ofelia Montesco as Rosita
- Armando Soto La Marina as Pinole
- Víctor Alcocer as Artemio Velasco
