= La otra mujer =

- Directed by: Julián Soler
- Written by: Edmundo Báez (adaptation); José Emilio Pacheco (dialogue); Julián Soler (adaptation)
- Produced by: Gregorio Walerstein
- Starring: Mauricio Garcés; Saby Kamalich; Félix González; Paula Cusi; María Duval; José Luis Moreno; Delia Peña Orta
- Cinematography: Xavier Cruz
- Edited by: Maximino Sánchez Molina
- Music by: Sergio Guerrero (song "Una gota de miel")
- Production company: Cima Films
- Release date: 20 July 1972 (Mexico)
- Running time: 95 minutes
- Country: Mexico
- Language: Spanish

La otra mujer (English: "The Other Woman") is a 1972 Mexican comedy drama film directed by Julián Soler and starring Mauricio Garcés, Saby Kamalich and María Duval. This film is a remake of the film Mi esposa y la otra (1952), which in turn is a remake of the Argentine film The Kids Grow Up (1942).

== Plot ==
Cristina (Saby Kamalich) and Ricardo (Félix González) have three children: Pablo (José Luis Moreno), Martha (Paula Cusi) and Claudia (Delia Peña Orta), but they are not married, because Ricardo is married to another woman, Alicia (María Duval). When he finds himself in a hurry when it seems that Alicia is going to find out about her secret life, Ricardo asks Alicia's cousin, Antonio (Mauricio Garcés), to help him by pretending to be Cristina's husband.

== Cast ==
- Mauricio Garcés as Antonio
- Saby Kamalich as Cristina Martínez
- Félix González as Ricardo
- Paula Cusi as Martha
- María Duval as Alicia
- José Luis Moreno as Pablo
- Delia Peña Orta as Claudia
- Gilberto Román as Martha's Boyfriend
- Jorge Patiño as Card Player
- Jorge Fegan as Card Player
- Inés Murillo as Sebastiana, maid
- Víctor Alcocer
- Luis Miranda
- Dolores Camarillo
- Sheila Donne as Mamacita Americana
- Ana Lilia Tovar as Antonio's Girlfriend
- Luciano Hernández de la Vega
- Ricardo Adalid
- Enrique Pontón

== Reception ==
Comparing the film with its previous 1952 and 1942 film versions, Emilio García Riera said that the films of 1942 and 1952 were better. Due to the scene that shows Garcés's character accompanied by an English-speaking blonde woman during a card game, in Stereotyped Images of United States Citizens in Mexican Cinema, 1930-1990, David E. Wilt cited the film as one of the films in Mexican cinema that extolled the figure of the blonde woman as an object of desire in Mexico.
