= The Hungry Ghosts =

- Theatrical release poster
- Directed by: Michael Imperioli
- Written by: Michael Imperioli
- Produced by: Howard Axel; Diane Crespo; Victoria Imperioli; Stefan Schaefer; Tina Thor
- Starring: Steve Schirripa; Aunjanue Ellis; Nick Sandow; Sharon Angela
- Cinematography: Dan Hersey
- Edited by: Erin Greenwell
- Music by: Elijah Amitin
- Distributed by: Eastgate Pictures
- Release dates: January 21, 2009 (Rotterdam); October 1, 2010 (United States)
- Running time: 104 minutes
- Country: United States
- Language: English

The Hungry Ghosts is a 2009 American dramatic film written and directed by Michael Imperioli. The film marked his directorial feature debut.

== Plot ==
Matthew (Emory Cohen) is a teenage boy in New York who attends therapy with his father Frank (Steve Schirripa) because of their troubled communication. During a session, Matthew runs away. Angela (Sharon Angela), his mother, is worried. Frank, however, is more concerned with his radio show, and whether his techs got his vodka. He proceeds to use cocaine as well before the show begins. Matthew goes to a park where a lot of homeless people are congregated. He meets a couple who give him alcohol and drugs. Later, the woman has sex with Matthew while the man watches.

Nadia (Aunjanue Ellis) abandons her room because she is a month late with her rent. She reconnects with an old friend from a yoga school, has sex with an old boyfriend, then leaves her yoga center friend's house when her friend becomes upset by her story of her relationship with Gus (Nick Sandow), her most recent lover. She has a meal on the stairs of a house. The woman living there comes home and tells her to leave, but Nadia refuses. The woman throws a bucket of water over her, and Nadia puts the bucket on the woman's head and beats on it.

Gus is just getting out of a ninety-day drug rehabilitation stint. He immediately goes out and gets drunk with an old man he meets in a restaurant. He calls Nadia again and again, but she will not answer his calls. He meets a woman, Lisette (Bess Rous), who has been in the same meditation class which he and Nadia attended. He succeeds in unnerving, and then seducing her, but instead of following through on that, he tells her to go home.

Matthew calls his father, who refuses to pick him up because he is in the middle of his show. Instead, Matthew's uncle, Joey (Joe Caniano), picks him up. Once home, Matthew will not say what happened, even though Angela assures she will not be angry. He tries to kill himself, but Angela and Joey head up to the mountains with him to help him work out his distress.

Once Frank learns what has happened, he heads to the mountains on a train, where he meets Nadia, who is fleeing the city. He begins to suffer chest pains, and Nadia calls for help. He is taken to a hospital. She is waiting for him when he comes out of the emergency room, and during a meal together, she encourages him to come to a meditation class with her. Lissette is in the class, but she and Nadia do not know each other. Frank begins to relax as the teacher leads them through guided breathing exercises. Gus, having taken an overdose of pills, arrives, causing distress to Nadia and Lisette by his presence. He sits next to Nadia, who obviously does not want him there, but with a blissful smile, he lies down on the floor and closes his eyes.

== Cast ==
- Steve Schirripa as Frank
- Sharon Angela as Angela
- Emory Cohen as Matthew
- Aunjanue Ellis as Nadia
- Vincent Curatola as Nicky Z
- John Ventimiglia as James
- Nick Sandow as Gus
- Ajay Naidu as Laurence
- Jim Hendricks as Ansel
- Sondra James as Lucy
- Jerry Grayson as Jerry
- Bess Rous as Lisette
- Zohra Lampert as Ruth

== Production notes ==
In an interview with MovieMaker magazine, Imperioli said he used techniques from John Cassavetes, his favorite filmmaker, in creating The Hungry Ghosts.

Although Imperioli did not appear in the film, he recruited four fellow castmates from the HBO television series, The Sopranos: Schirripa, Angela, Ventimiglia and Curatola.

The film was executive produced by Joseph Scarpinito and Joseph Laurita.

== Awards and nominations ==
International Film Festival Rotterdam

- Nominated, "Tiger Award"
