= Cumbres Borrascosas (1964 TV series) =

- Genre: Telenovela
- Country of origin: Mexico
- Original language: Spanish

Original release
- Network: Telesistema Mexicano
- Release: 1964

Cumbres Borrascosas is a Mexican telenovela produced by Televisa for Telesistema Mexicano in 1964.

== Cast ==
- Lorena Velázquez
- Manuel López Ochoa
- Guillermo Herrera
- Germán Robles
- Fanny Schiller
