= Sharon Angela =

American actress

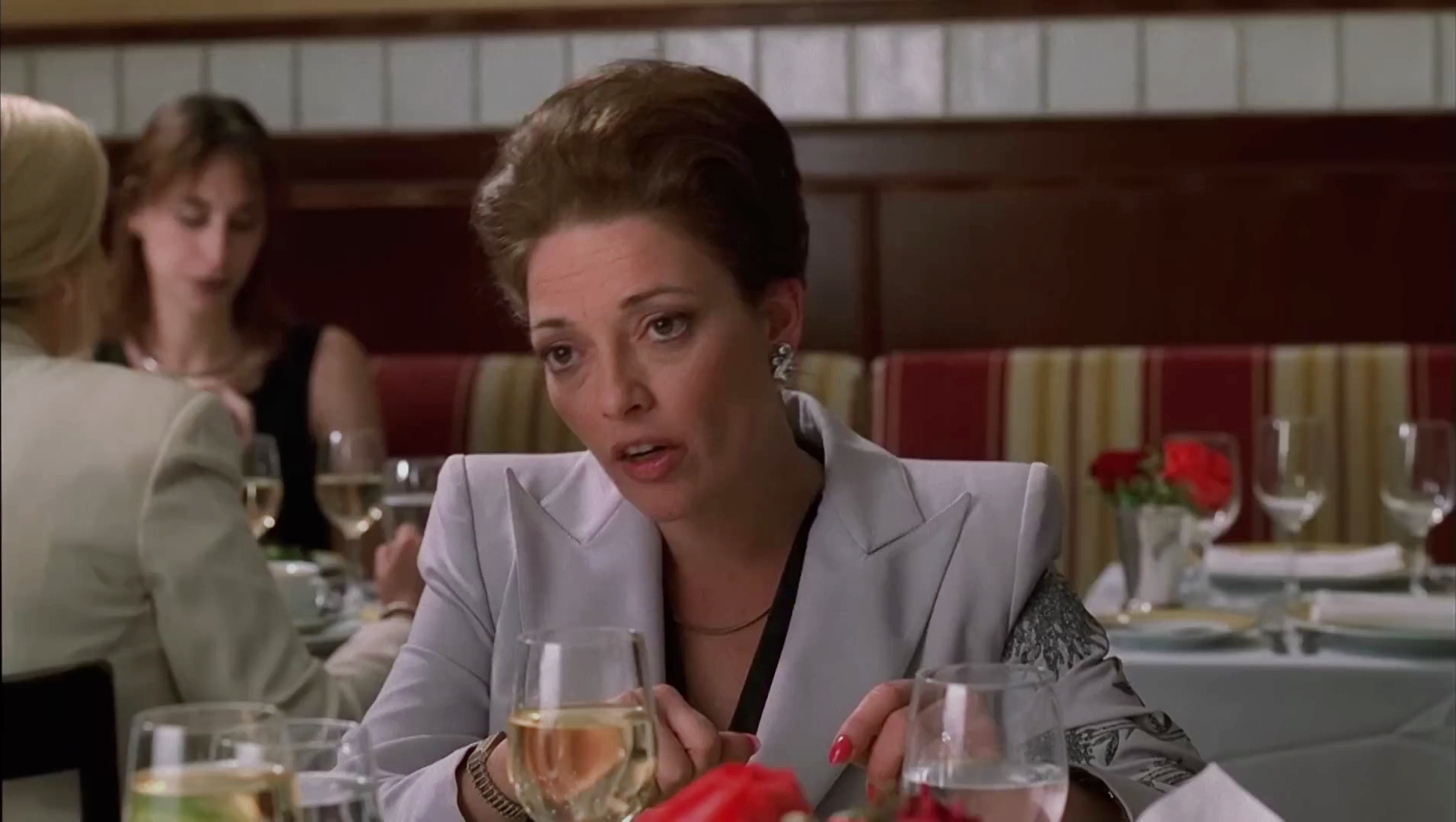
- Angela as Rosalie Aprile in The Sopranos
- Born: Sharon Angela Curryto; August 19, 1961 (age 65)
- Occupation: Actress
- Years active: 1992–present

Sharon Angela Curryto (born August 8, 1961) is an American actress. She is best known for her portrayal of Rosalie Aprile on the HBO series The Sopranos.

== Biography ==
Sharon Angela Curryto was born on August 8, 1961 and grew up Stamford, Connecticut. She has appeared in several films such as Cabaret Maxime, The Hungry Ghosts, Ghost Dog: The Way of the Samurai, On the Run, and Two Family House. Her television credits include guest appearances on Law & Order and Law & Order: Criminal Intent. During the sixth season of The Sopranos, Angela was elevated from guest star to series regular for her character Rosalie Aprile, the widow of Jackie Aprile Sr., and is also a close friend of Carmela Soprano.

She co-wrote the 2005 film, The Collection and co-directed the 2007 film, Made in Brooklyn. She also voiced Angie Pegorino in the 2008 video game Grand Theft Auto IV.

Angela is an instructor at the Lee Strasberg Theatre and Film Institute in Los Angeles.

== Filmography ==
=== Film ===
Year	Title	Role	Notes
1992	Nowhereville	Dextra	Short film
1993	Fly by Night	Lisa	
1993	The Dutch Master	Dorothy	Short film
1996	Tales of Erotica	Dorothy	Segment: "The Dutch Master"
1996	Breathing Room	Additional Patron	
1999	On the Run	Tina	
1999	Ghost Dog: The Way of the Samurai	Blonde with Jaguar	
2000	Two Family House	Gloria	
2003	Red Passport	Theresa	
2004	Lbs.	Theresa Perota	
2004	Confessions of a Dangerous Mime	Mimi Telesta	Short film
2005	Paintball the Movie: Court Jesters	Eric's Mom	
2005	The Collection	Several characters	Also writer
2009	Circledrawers	Judy	TV Movie
2009	The Hungry Ghosts	Sharon	
2009	City Island	Tanya	
2009	Frame of Mind	Mary	
2010	Skate	Mom	Short film
2011	Hip Priest	Franny	Short film
2013	Broken City	Amber (voice)	
2013	Empire State	Dina	
2013	Dump Truck	Aunt Mary	Short film
2013	Over/Under	Teresa	TV movie
2014	The M Word	Angela De Marco	
2018	Cabaret Maxime	Shannon	
2019	Across Sagittarius Street	Gordia	
2023	Under the Boardwalk	Mrs. Marinara (voice)	

=== Television ===
Year	Title	Role	Notes
1993–2004	Law & Order	Brenda McCarthy; Doris; Delia; Vanessa	5 episodes: (Season 4 Episode 4: "Profile") (1993) - Brenda McCarthy; (Season 6 Episode 7: "Humiliation") (1995) - Doris; (Season 6 Episode 23: "Aftershock") (1996) - Delia; (Season 7 Episode 7: "Deadbeat") (1996) - Delia; (Season 14 Episode 14: "City Hall") (2004) - Vanessa
1999–2007	The Sopranos	Rosalie Aprile	38 episodes
2002	Law & Order: Criminal Intent	Connie	Season 1 Episode 15: "Semi-Professional"
2010	Celebrity Ghost Stories	Herself	Episode: "Sugar Ray Leonard/Aida Tuturro/Johnathon Schaech/Sharon Angela"
2014	Californication	Cranky Woman on Plane	Season 7 Episode 12: "Grace"

=== Other ===
Video Games
Year	Title	Role	Notes
2008	Grand Theft Auto IV	Angie Pegorino (voice)	

=== As writer ===
Film
Year	Title	Notes
2005	The Collection	

=== As director ===
Film
Year	Title	Notes
2007	Made in Brooklyn	
