= La duquesa del Tepetate =

- Directed by: Juan José Segura
- Written by: Juan José Segura
- Produced by: Sidney T. Bruckner
- Starring: Sara García, Abel Salazar, Gloria Lozano
- Cinematography: Ezequiel Carrasco
- Edited by: José Juan Munguía
- Music by: José de la Vega
- Release date: 21 July 1951
- Running time: 93 minutes
- Country: Mexico
- Language: Spanish

La duquesa del Tepetate ("The Duchess of Tepetate") is a 1951 Mexican film. It stars Sara García.

== Cast ==
- Sara García - Chonita
- Abel Salazar - Enrique
- Gloria Lozano - Isabel
- José Torvay - Don Simón
- Salvador Quiroz - Don Rodolfo
- Humberto Rodríguez - Dr. Manzanares
- Hernán Vera - Hotelero
- Fernando Torre Laphame - Ángel (as Fernando Torre L.)
- Lidia Franco - María
- Pedro Elviro - (as Pedro Elviro 'Pitouto')
