= Joanna (1925 film) =

1925 film

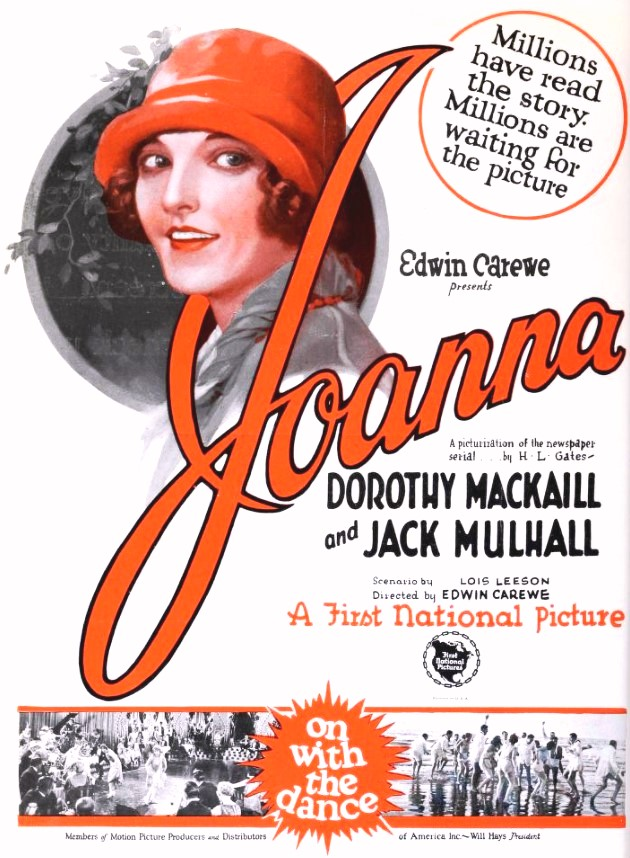
- Trade advertisement
- Directed by: Edwin Carewe
- Written by: Lois Leeson (scenario)
- Based on: "Joanna, of the Skirts Too Short and the Lips Too Red and the Tongue Too Pert" by Henry Leyford Gates
- Produced by: Edwin Carewe
- Starring: Dorothy Mackaill; Jack Mulhall
- Cinematography: Al M. Green; Robert Kurrle
- Edited by: Edward M. McDermott
- Music by: Guy K. Austin
- Distributed by: First National Pictures
- Release date: December 14, 1925 (United States)
- Running time: 80 mins.
- Country: United States
- Language: Silent (English intertitles)

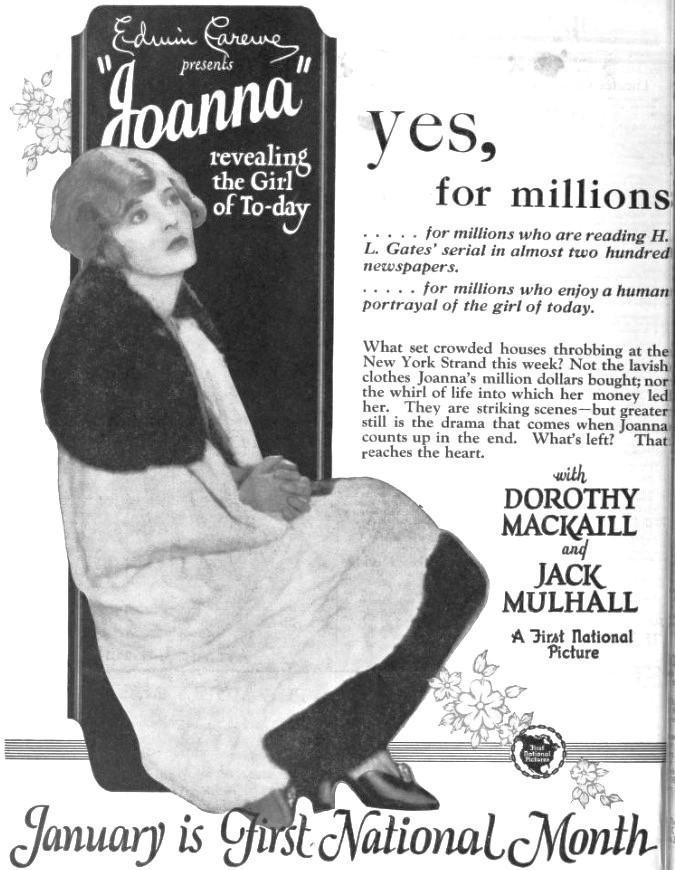
Joanna ad

Joanna is a 1925 American silent romantic comedy film produced and directed by Edwin Carewe and distributed by First National Pictures. The film was based on the short story "Joanna, of the Skirts Too Short and the Lips Too Red and the Tongue Too Pert" by Henry Leyford Gates. The film starred Dorothy Mackaill and Jack Mulhall and marked the first motion-picture appearance of Mexican actress Dolores del Río.

== Plot ==
As described in a review in a film magazine, Joanna (Mackaill), a poor saleswoman in a swell establishment, is suddenly notified that a million dollars has been placed to her credit. This gives her an entry into the fast wealthy set but results in alienating her real sweetheart, a struggling young architect. There follows an era of gay parties and reckless spending, and in a couple of years the million is gone. Her wealthy admirer (Nicholson) makes a proposal without mentioning marriage and she almost kills him. She then learns it was an experiment resulting from a discussion among wealthy men as to whether the modern girl would remain "good" in the face of temptation after acquiring a taste of luxury, and she was selected because one of the men who formerly loved her mother believed in her. This man adopts her as his daughter, and her sweetheart comes back to her.

== Cast ==
- Dorothy Mackaill as Joanna Manners
- Jack Mulhall as John Wilmore
- Paul Nicholson as Frank Brandon
- George Fawcett as Anthony Eggleson
- John T. Murray as Lord Teddy Dorminster
- Rita Carewe as Georgia Leach
- Dolores del Río as Carlotta de Silva
- Lillian Langdon as Mrs. Roxanna Adams
- Edwards Davis as Grayson
- Bob Hart as The Chauffeur

== Reception ==
A review noted that the film was similar to another that Mackaill had recently starred in. Both Chickie (1925) and Joanna deal with the experiences of a young woman with a regular job among the jazzy ultra-rich class, although the films tell the story from a different angles. Also, in both films Paul Nicholson was cast as the idle rich young man.

== Preservation ==
With no prints of Joanna located in any film archives, it is a lost film.

== See also ==
- Dolores del Río filmography
