= Pancho Tequila =

- DVD cover
- El Bronco de Caborca
- Directed by: Miguel M. Delgado
- Written by: Luis Alcoriza
- Produced by: Pedro Galindo
- Starring: Alberto Vázquez; María Duval; Mónica Serna
- Cinematography: Jorge Stahl Jr.
- Edited by: Jorge Bustos
- Music by: Sergio Guerrero
- Production companies: Cinematográfica Galindo S.A.; Filmadora Chapultepec
- Release date: March 19, 1970 (Mexico)
- Running time: 95 minutes
- Country: Mexico
- Language: Spanish

Pancho Tequila (Spanish: El Bronco de Caborca) is a 1970 Mexican drama comedy western film written by Luis Alcoriza, directed by Miguel M. Delgado and starring Alberto Vázquez, María Duval and Mónica Serna.

== Cast ==
- Alberto Vázquez
- María Duval
- Víctor Junco
- Alejandro Reyna "Tio Plácido"
- Manuel Alvarado
- Carlos Nieto
- Juan Garza
- Carlos Cardán
- Mónica Serna
- Quintín Bulnes
- Ana Beatriz Amelio
- Jesús Casillas
- José Luis Caro
- Federico González
- Regino Herrera
