= Jim Hendricks =

American actor and disc jockey (1946–2018)

- Born: October 2, 1949; United States
- Died: March 17, 2018 (aged 68); United States
- Occupation: Actor

Jim Hendricks was an American actor and former disc jockey best known for his role as movie host Commander USA on USA Network's Commander USA's Groovie Movies that ran from 1985 to 1989.

Hendricks also acted in theater and on television in such series as Law & Order: Special Victims Unit.

Hendricks starred in Michael Imperioli's 2009 film The Hungry Ghosts.

Hendricks died on March 17, 2018.
