= Santo vs. the Evil Brain =

Santo contra el cerebro del mal
- Directed by: Joselito Rodríguez
- Written by: Fernando Osés; Enrique Zambrano
- Produced by: Jesús Alvariño; Jorge García Besné; Carlos Garduño G. Enrique Zambrano
- Music by: Salvador Espinosa
- Production companies: Agrupación de Técnicos Cinematografistas de Cuba; Azteca Films
- Distributed by: Columbia Pictures (within the United States)
- Release date: July 1961 (Mexico City)
- Running time: 70 minutes
- Countries: Mexico; Cuba
- Language: Spanish

Santo contra el cerebro del mal (marketed as Santo vs. the Evil Brain and Brain of Evil outside of Mexico) is a 1961 Cuban-Mexican horror-action film directed by Joselito Rodríguez and starring Santo, Joaquín Cordero, Norma Suárez and Enrique Zambrano. It is the first Santo film chronologically. Released in 1961, it was filmed in Cuba in 1958, shortly before Fidel Castro entered Havana.

== Plot ==
The film opens with three gangsters cornering Santo (Note: Throughout the film, Santo is only referred to as "El Enmascarado". However, the titular character is marketed as "Santo".) (Rodolfo Guzmán Huerta) in a deserted alley and knock him out. He is taken to the laboratory of a crazed Doctor Campos (Joaquín Cordero) and turned into a docile servant of the mad doctor through a series of injections and electric shocks. Campos is apparently a respected scientist, the friend of Lieutenant Zambrano. Zambrano warns him to beware: other scientists have recently been kidnapped. Almost as they speak, the gangsters and the brainwashed Santo assault the bodyguards of a Doctor Lowel and carry off the scientist. He is later given the brainwashing treatment at Campos' lab. The bodyguards tell Zambrano that Santo, an undercover agent for the police force, was one of the kidnappers. Meanwhile, another undercover agent, El Incógnito (Fernando Osés) uses a special device to locate the hideout of Doctor Campos.

Elisa (Norma Suárez), Campos' secretary, meets Gerardo (Alberto Inzúa), her boyfriend and the assistant of Campos (in relation to his good scientific work only) outside a bank. Elisa tries to speak to the bank manager, but gets an empty response; he has actually been brainwashed by Campos. The brainwashed manager then proceeds to rob the bank, as Campos monitors the happenings. It later unfolds that Campos has a liking for Elisa; he then asks his henchmen to kidnap her. The crime is reported by Gerardo. Zambrano deduces that the reason for Elisa's kidnapping was that she was a key witness to the bank robbery. Meanwhile, Doctor Campos hands an agent a few classified papers, promising to sell him a formula for a "cell disintegrator" the following day.

Incógnito returns to the laboratory and overcomes Santo after a tough and hard-won fight. The black-masked Incógnito injects Santo with the antidote to the brainwashing serum, but tells Santo to pretend that he is still brainwashed.

Doctor Campos hands Gerardo a drugged drink and flees to his lab via a secret passageway. He arrives at the hideout; the foreign agent arrives with another man to check the plans for the cell disintegrator. However, Zambrano, having been tipped off by El Incógnito, orders a raid on the lab. Santo and Incógnito battle Campos' henchmen as the police arrive, but Campos manages to escape with Elisa. Returning to his house, Campos holds Elisa hostage. Incógnito distracts him while Santo climbs up over the roof to sneak in through the back way; Campos shoots El Incógnito, but Gerardo wakes up from his drugged stupor and struggles with him. Santo bursts in and fights with Campos, who seizes a knife and is ready to kill the masked wrestler until Zambrano shoots him in the nick of time. With his dying breath, Campos apologizes to Elisa.

== Cast ==
- Joaquín Cordero as Doctor Campos
- Norma Suárez as Elisa
- Enrique Zambrano as Lieutenant Zambrano
- Alberto Inzúa as Gerardo
- Rodolfo Guzmán Huerta as Santo (known as El Enmascarado within the film)
- Fernando Osés as El Incognito

== See also ==
- El Santo filmography
