= Los alegres Aguilares =

- Starring: Antonio Aguilar, Elsa Cárdenas, María Duval
- Release date: 1967
- Country: Mexico
- Language: Spanish

Los alegres Aguilares ("The Cheerful Aguilares") is a 1967 Mexican Western drama film directed by Miguel Zacarias and starring Antonio Aguilar, Elsa Cárdenas and María Duval, with the special participation of the actress and singer Enriqueta Jiménez "La Prieta Linda".

The adventurer Manuel comes across Carlos, who is almost his identical twin. Manuel comes from a rich family so he offers Carlos some money to pass himself off as him for a young woman that wants to marry him. Carlos asks him to return the favor.
