= Invincible Guns =

1960 film

- Directed by: Benito Alazraki
- Written by: Alfredo Salazar
- Produced by: Guillermo Calderón; Roberto G. Rivera
- Starring: Elvira Quintana; Armando Silvestre
- Cinematography: Enrique Wallace
- Edited by: Jorge Busto
- Music by: Antonio Díaz Conde
- Production company: Cinematográfica Calderón
- Release date: 26 May 1960
- Running time: 75 minutes
- Country: Mexico
- Language: Spanish

Invincible Guns (Spanish: Pistolas invencibles) is a 1960 Mexican western film directed by Benito Alazraki and starring Elvira Quintana and Armando Silvestre.

== Cast ==
- Elvira Quintana as Carmen Montenegro
- Armando Silvestre as Pancho Corona
- Roberto G. Rivera as Salvador Jiménez (Chava)
- José Elías Moreno
- Emma Roldán as Tía Juana
- José Eduardo Pérez as Toro
- Emilio Garibay
- Alfonso Arnold
- José Chávez
- Julián de Meriche
- Agustín Fernández as Esbirro del toro
- Magda Monzón as Mujer de Julio
- Rubén Márquez as Hombre en cantina
- Ramón Sánchez as Esbirro del toro
- Hernán Vera

== Bibliography ==
- Emilio García Riera. Historia documental del cine mexicano: 1959–1960. Universidad de Guadalajara, 1994.
