= Gloria Lozano =

Mexican actress

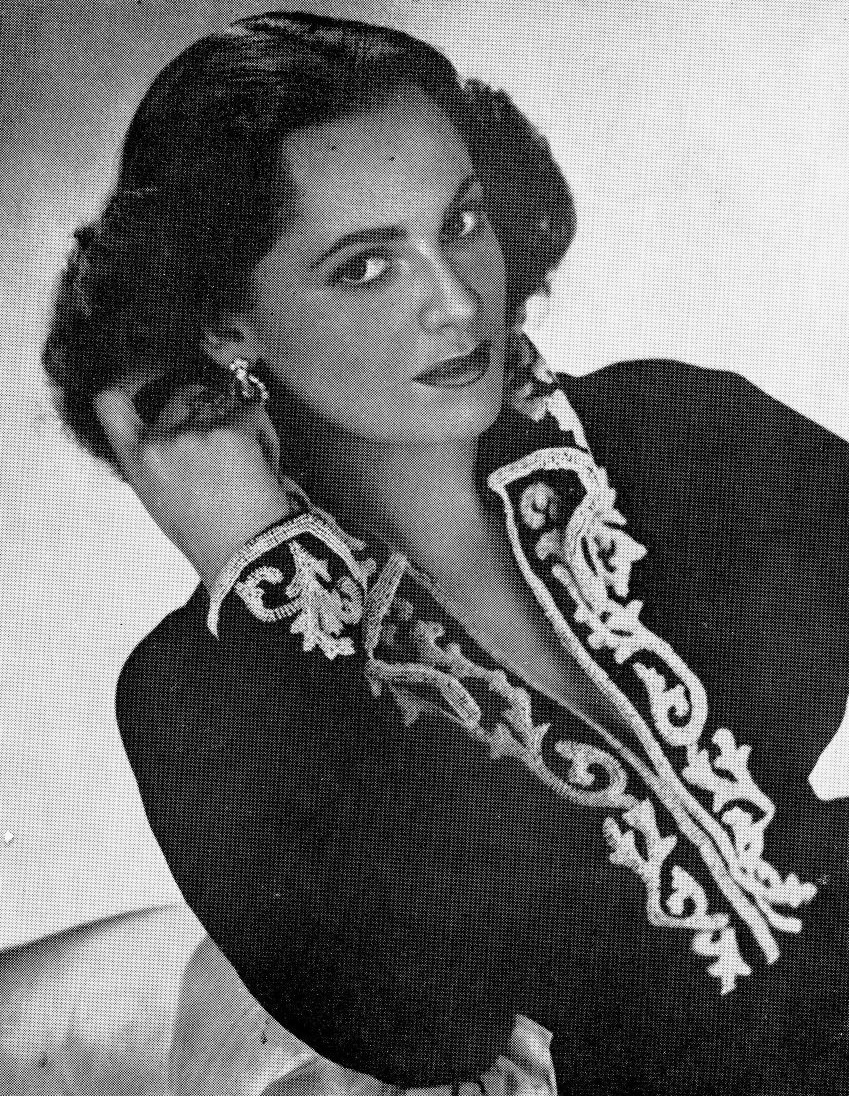
- Gloria Lozano in 1954
- Born: 8 March 1924; Jiquilpan de Juárez, Michoacán, Mexico
- Died: 15 November 1991 (aged 67); Mexico City, Mexico
- Occupations: Actress, producer

Gloria Lozano was an actress and producer active during the golden age of Mexican cinema. She also co-wrote the 1957 film Mi influyente mujer. One Los Angeles Times reviewer described her as "a fiery actress with enormous, beautiful eyes."

== Selected filmography ==
- Happiness (1957) (also producer)
- La culta dama (1957) (also producer)
- Mi influyente mujer (1957) (also producer, screenwriter)
- El vengador solitario (1954)
- El tesoro de la muerte (1954)
- La duquesa del Tepetate (1951)
- Donde nacen los pobres (1950)
- Sentencia (1950)
- The Perez Family (1949)
- Secreto entre mujeres (1949)
- Los viejos somos así (1948)
- La novia de la Marina (1948)
- El cuarto mandamiento (1948)
- Músico, poeta y loco (1948)
- Cartas marcadas (1948)
- Que Dios me perdone (1948)
- El muchacho alegre (1948)
- Woman (1947)
- Pecadora (1947)
- Soy un prófugo (1946)
