= Ofelia Montesco =

Peruvian-Mexican actress (1936–1983)

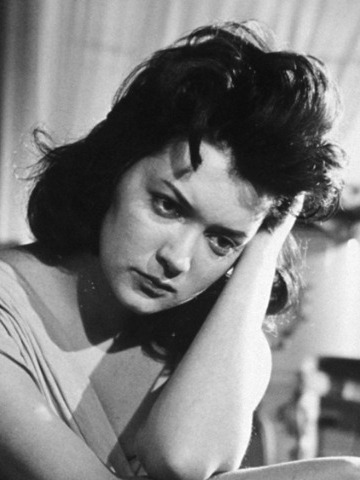
- Montesco in The Exterminating Angel (1962)
- Born: Ofelia Irene Grabowski Edery; 10 September 1936; Iquitos City, Loreto Region, Peru
- Died: 16 June 1983 (aged 46); Cuauhtémoc, Mexico City, Mexico
- Occupation: Actress
- Years active: 1952–1983
- Spouse: Álvaro Ortiz Sandoval

Ofelia Irene Grabowski Edery (10 September 1936 – 16 June 1983), known professionally as Ofelia Montesco, was a Peruvian-born actress who is best remembered for her roles in cinema and television of Mexico. She was born in Iquitos City, in the Loreto Region of Peru, to Segismundo Pedro Grabowski and Julia Edery. In 1972, she portrayed Eugénie de Montijo, consort of Napoleon III, in the historical telenovela El carruaje.

She died in 1983 from complications due to stomach cancer, and was buried in the Panteón Jardín in Mexico City.

== Selected filmography ==
- The Life of Agustín Lara (1959)
- Sube y baja (1959)
- Santo vs. las Mujeres Vampiro (1962)
- El ángel exterminador (1962)
- El zurdo (1965)
- Martín Romero El Rápido (1966)
- Veinticuatro horas de placer (1969)
