= Nos lleva la tristeza =

- Written by: Jaime Salvador
- Starring: Álvaro Zermeño, Manuel López Ochoa, Irma Dorantes, María Duval, Sara García
- Release date: 1965
- Running time: 100 minute
- Country: Mexico
- Language: Spanish

Nos lleva la tristeza ("We Take the Sadness") is a 1965 Mexican western drama film directed by Jaime Salvador and starring Álvaro Zermeño, Manuel López Ochoa, Irma Dorantes, María Duval and Sara García.
