= I Am a Fugitive =

1946 film

- Directed by: Miguel M. Delgado
- Written by: Arnold Lippschitz; Hans Wilhelm; Jaime Salvador; Miguel M. Delgado
- Starring: Mario Moreno «Cantinflas»; Emilia Guiú; Carmelita González
- Cinematography: Jack Draper
- Edited by: Jorge Bustos
- Music by: Gonzalo Curiel
- Production company: Cora Films
- Release date: 11 March 1946
- Country: Mexico
- Language: Spanish

I Am a Fugitive (Spanish: Soy un prófugo) is a 1946 Mexican comedy-crime film directed by Miguel M. Delgado and starring Mario Moreno «Cantinflas», Emilia Guiú and Carmelita González. The film's sets were designed by Manuel Fontanals. This film is known for its blend of crime, drama, and suspense, and brings life to a story centered on crime, mistaken identity, and justice. The film reflects themes prevalent in Mexican cinema at the time, such as moral integrity, the battle between right and wrong, and the social consequences of crime. Delgado, a frequent collaborator with iconic comedian Cantinflas, brought his unique style to this film, making it a memorable piece in the Mexican Golden Age of Cinema.

== Plot ==
The story revolves around a man who, against his will, gets involved in a criminal enterprise and has to work through a number of miscommunications and challenges in order to clear his name. As he navigates the dangers and moral dilemmas of this criminal enterprise, the protagonist finds himself at odds not only with hardened criminals and gangsters but also with a corrupt legal system that seems more interested in condemning the truth than in understanding it. His journey, which is set in urban Mexico, reveals the ethical flaws in the legal system and how society views crime. Dramatic confrontations and suspenseful moments are seen all throughout the movie to create a plot that keeps viewers invested in the characters' outcomes. These moments are not only physical, as one would assume for the head of a criminal enterprise, but they are also emotional, as he is constantly misunderstood and forced to make decisions. Audiences in post-World War II Mexico, where social issues and judicial reform were important subjects, found resonance in the film's depiction of themes including guilt, repentance, and the search for justice. These viewers saw the protagonist's quest for justice as a mirror of more significant social concerns of the day, like the necessity for the legal system to be empathetic and the understanding that people may change and turn from their sins. The protagonist's struggle to clear his identity serves as a metaphor for the difficulties faced by people who must contend with society's criticisms while retaining their humanity and integrity. In addition to keeping viewers interested, the film's depiction of his journey, which is full of tension and moral dilemmas, invites them to consider mercy, justice, and the resiliency of the human spirit.

== Themes ==
An important theme seen in this film is the concept of justice and imperfection. It gives a deeper look into the eyes of someone who is unjustly accused and the challenges they face dealing with the legal system. This movie not only sheds light on the justice system but also on the emotional effects on the wrongly accused. Another common theme seen in this movie deals with redemption and forgiveness. The protagonist of this story is found in morally questionable situations as a result of the criminal enterprise he is involved in, although he never agreed to join it. This film captures his quest to clear his name and redeem himself in the eyes of the public, which brings up ideas about morality and the effects of societal views on a person's reality.

== Legacy ==
Overall, I Am a Fugitive (Yo soy un prófugo) is a worthwhile movie that exemplifies the creative and narrative talents of Mexican cinema in the 1940s, which is often regarded as the Golden Age of Mexican Cinema. This film, directed by Miguel M. Delgado, stands out among his many works because it examines issues of justice, atonement, and identity. Its gripping story, which dives into the moral dilemmas encountered by people falsely accused or involved in criminal activity, appeals to viewers long after it was released. The cast's powerful performances, particularly in depicting the protagonist's moral struggle and quest for repentance, heighten the film's emotional impact and demonstrate Delgado's talent for vividly capturing human feelings. Delgado’s work was instrumental in showing how popular films could address complex social issues, such as the limitations of the justice system and the struggles of marginalized individuals, within accessible and engaging narratives. This approach set a foundation for future Mexican filmmakers to use cinema as a means of exploring societal values, prompting audiences to question norms and reflect on concepts of guilt, forgiveness, and social justice. In later years, I Am a Fugitive has continued to be appreciated by classic film enthusiasts and scholars alike, who view it as an important piece of cinematic history that exemplifies the richness of Mexican film during a formative era. Its influence can be seen in later Mexican films as they attempted to handle other socially relevant themes. The film’s legacy is also preserved through scholarly works that highlight its importance in shaping the cultural narrative of 1940s Mexico. This legacy positions I Am a Fugitive as more than just a film; it is a cultural artifact that reflects certain moral and ethical conversations of its time, serving as a reminder of the power of cinema to entertain, inform, and inspire critical thought.

== Other movies by Miguel Delgado ==
Miguel M. Delgado, an important director of Mexico's Golden Age of Cinema, worked quite extensively with comedian Cantinflas, who was the star of this movie. Some of their iconic films include Ahí está el detalle (1940), a classic blending comedy and mistaken identity. El Bolero de Raquel (1957), Cantinflas' first color film, was also an important film they worked on together. Delgado's versatility extended to other genres, including action and drama, with works like El Supersabio (1948). His films often combined humor, social commentary, and innovative storytelling, securing his place in Mexican cinema history.

== Cast ==
- Mario Moreno as Cantinflas
- Emilia Guiú as Raquel
- Daniel "Chino" Herrera as Carmelo
- Agustín Isunza as Emilio Blanco, inspector de policía
- Rafael Alcayde as El jefe
- Carmelita González as Rosita
- José Elías Moreno as Gargantúa / El Pimpón
- Ángel T. Sala
- Estanislao Schillinsky
- Rafael Icardo
- Roberto Corell
- Rodolfo Acosta as Gang member
- Stephen Berne as Esbirro pelón del jefe (uncredited)
- María Luisa Cortés as Invitada a fiesta (uncredited)
- Pedro Elviro as Esbirro chaparro del jefe (uncredited)
- Edmundo Espino as Empleador (uncredited)
- Georgina González as Sirvienta (uncredited)
- Gloria Lozano as Invitada a fiesta (uncredited)
- Chel López as Esbirro del jefe (uncredited)
- José Muñoz as Detective de policía (uncredited)
- José Ortega as Invitado a fiesta (uncredited)
- José Ortiz de Zárate as Don Prospero, gerente banco (uncredited)
- Roberto Y. Palacios as Cliente en tienda (uncredited)
- Humberto Rodríguez as Cliente en tienda (uncredited)
- Félix Samper as Representante del banco (uncredited)
- Manuel Trejo Morales as Esbirro del jefe (uncredited)

== Bibliography ==
- Pilcher, Jeffrey M. Cantinflas and the Chaos of Mexican Modernity. Rowman & Littlefield, 2001.
