= Juan Colorado =

- Directed by: Miguel Zacarías
- Starring: Antonio Aguilar, María Duval, Elsa Cárdenas, Flor Silvestre, Mary Castell, Norma Navarro
- Release date: 18 August 1966
- Country: Mexico
- Language: Spanish

Juan Colorado is a 1966 Mexican Western drama film, directed by Miguel Zacarías and starring Antonio Aguilar, María Duval and Elsa Cárdenas. Supporting cast includes Flor Silvestre, Mary Castell and Norma Navarro.

== Plot ==
Juan Lorenzo de la Riba (Antonio Aguilar) tries to leave his girlfriend behind, but rich hacendada Silvia Guerrero (María Duval) implies to Juan Lorenzo that he has to marry her because he defiled her honor. Silvia also states that Juan worries his father Don Artemio with his lack of responsibility. Silvia is engaged to Rafael Ortigoza (Carlos Agostí), and she intends to marry Juan Lorenzo. Silvia's father plots to assassinate Juan and Don Artemio. Silvia is tricked into believing that Juan Lorenzo is dead, and so she is forced to marry Rafael.
