= Dangers of Youth =

- Directed by: Benito Alazraki
- Written by: Julio Alejandro; Héctor Mendoza (play)
- Produced by: Guillermo Calderón
- Starring: Elvira Quintana; Teresa Velázquez; Fernando Luján; Manuel "Loco" Valdés
- Cinematography: Enrique Wallace
- Edited by: Alfredo Rosas Priego
- Music by: Antonio Díaz Conde
- Production company: Cinematográfica Calderón
- Release date: 27 October 1960
- Country: Mexico
- Language: Spanish

Dangers of Youth (Spanish: Peligros de juventud) is a 1960 Mexican drama film directed by Benito Alazraki and starring Elvira Quintana, Teresa Velázquez, Fernando Luján and Manuel "Loco" Valdés.

== Cast ==
- Elvira Quintana as Sue
- Teresa Velázquez as Catalina
- Fernando Luján as Ricardo
- Manuel "Loco" Valdés as Charol
- Roberto G. Rivera as Federico as Padre de Catalina
- Aída Araceli as Elsa
- Guillermina Téllez Girón as Alma
- Xavier Loyá as Andrés
- Héctor Godoy as Alfredo
- Judy Ponte as Amiga de Matilde
- Erika Rener as Matilde
- José Luis Moreno
- Emma Roldán as Lupe
- Guillermina Mayaudón
- Leopoldo Salazar
- Ivan Richard Kraskin
- Mario Cid
- Enedina Díaz de León as Vendedora de flores
- Ignacio Peón as Profesor
- Hernán Vera as Cliente

== Bibliography ==
- Emilio García Riera. Historia documental del cine mexicano: 1959-1960. Universidad de Guadalajara, 1994.
