= Ruletero a toda marcha =

- Directed by: Rafael Baledón
- Written by: Rafael Baledón
- Starring: Eulalio González «Piporro» María Duval; Norma Angélica; Sara García; Emma Roldán; Lucía Prado
- Release date: 1962
- Country: Mexico
- Language: Spanish

Ruletero a toda marcha ("Taxi Driver in Full Swing") is a 1962 Mexican film written and directed by Rafael Baledón and starring Eulalio González «Piporro», María Duval, Norma Angélica, Sara García, Emma Roldán and Lucía Prado. This film marked the film debut of the actress, comedian, singer-songwriter and dancer, María Elena Velasco, in uncredited roles, and the only in which Duval does not sing music themes on scene.
