= The Rape of the Sabine Women (1962 film) =

- Directed by: Alberto Gout
- Written by: Alberto Gout
- Starring: Teresa Velázquez; Lorena Velázquez; Wolf Ruvinskis; Luis Induni; Victor Ruiz
- Release date: 1962
- Country: Mexico
- Language: Spanish

El Rapto de las Sabinas (English Translation: The Rape of the Sabine Women) is a 1962 historical drama film, written and directed by Alberto Gout, and starring Teresa Velázquez, Lorena Velázquez, Wolf Ruvinskis, Luis Induni and Victor Ruiz. It is an adaptation of the Roman foundation myth of Rape of the Sabine women by the Romans shortly after the foundation of the city of Rome (probably in the 750s BC).

== Cast ==
- Teresa Velázquez as Rhea Silvia
- Lorena Velázquez as Hersilia
- Wolf Ruvinskis as Romulus
- Luis Induni as Titus Tacius
- Victor Ruiz as Remus

== See also ==
- List of historical drama films
- List of films set in ancient Rome
