= La señora Muerte =

1969 film by Jaime Salvador

- Directed by: Jaime Salvador
- Written by: Ramón Obón
- Produced by: Jorge García Besné; Luis Enrique Vergara
- Starring: John Carradine; Regina Torné
- Cinematography: Alfredo Uribe
- Edited by: José Juan Munguía
- Music by: Gustavo César Carrión
- Release date: 28 November 1969 (Mexico)
- Running time: 85 minutes
- Country: Mexico
- Language: Spanish

La señora Muerte (released in English in the US as Madame Death and in the UK as The Death Woman) is a 1969 Mexican horror, mistery and science fiction film, directed by Jaime Salvador, and starring John Carradine, Regina Torné, Elsa Cárdenas and Isela Vega.

== Plot ==
When her elderly husband suddenly dies, and she in turn is affected by a condition that disfigures half of her face, Marlene (Regina Torné), a fashion entrepreneur, is forced to turn to Dr. Favel (John Carradine), a mad scientist who tells her that the solution to both predicaments is to bring him fresh blood from young women, for which Marlene turns into a serial killer.

== Cast ==
- John Carradine as Dr. Favel.
  - In the Spanish-language release of the film, Carradine was dubbed to Spanish by Mexican actor Víctor Alcocer.
- Regina Torné as Marlene
- Elsa Cárdenas as Julie
- Miguel Ángel Álvarez as Tony Winter
- Isela Vega as Lisa
- Víctor Junco as Andrés
- Carlos Ancira as Laor

== Bibliography ==
- Quinlan, David. The Illustrated Directory of Film Stars. Hippocrene Books, 1981.
- Quinlan, David. The Illustrated Encyclopedia of Movie Character Actors. Harmony Books, 1986.
- Amador, María Luisa. Ayala Blanco, Jorge. Cartelera cinematográfica, 1960–1969. UNAM, 1986.
- García Riera, Emilio. Historia documental del cine mexicano, Volumen 13. University of Guadalajara, 1992.
- Weaver, Tom; Mank, Gregory W. John Carradine: The Films. McFarland, 1999.
