= Armando Silvestre =

American and Mexican actor (1926–2024)

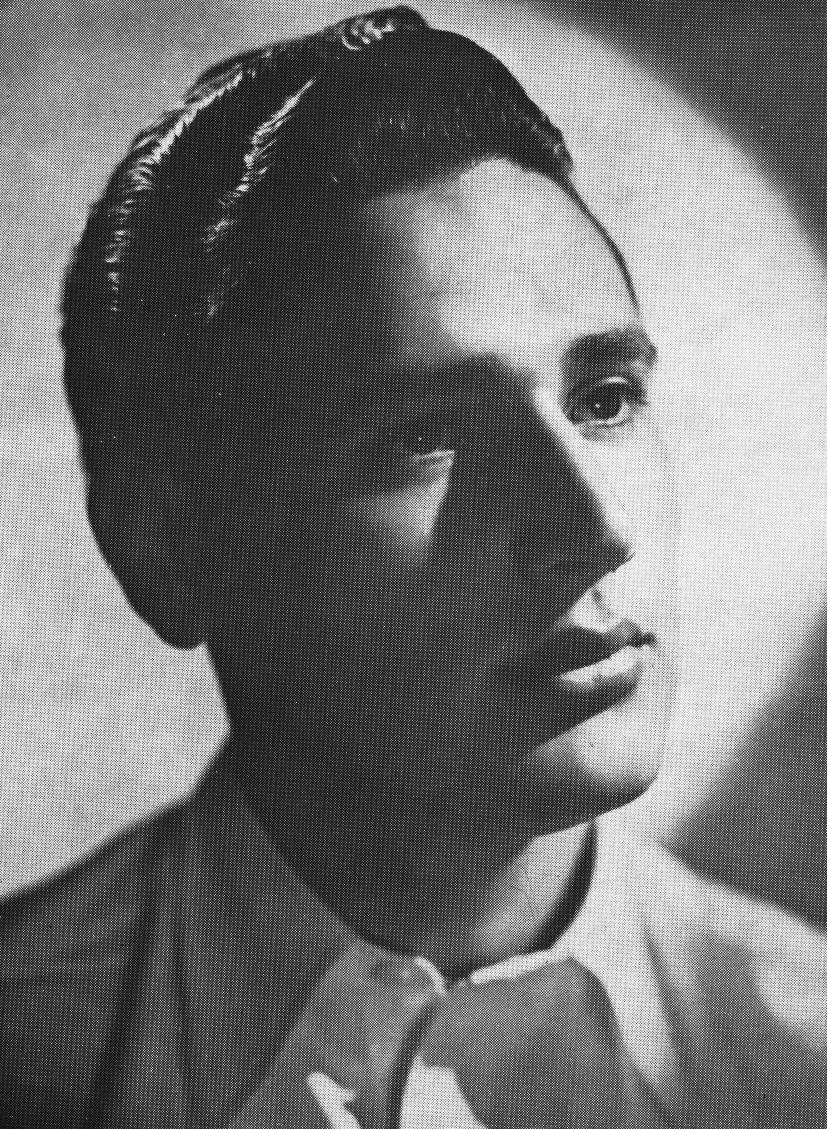
- Silvestre in 1954
- Born: Armando Silvestre Carrascosa; January 28, 1926; San Diego, California, U.S.
- Died: June 2, 2024 (aged 98); Coronado, California, U.S.
- Occupation: Actor
- Years active: 1948–2017

Armando Enrique Ricardo Silvestre Carrascosa (January 28, 1926 – June 2, 2024) was an American and Mexican actor.

== Life and career ==
Silvestre was born on January 28, 1926, in San Diego, California, United States, but was raised in Tijuana, Baja California, Mexico. He dropped out of college in order to pursue a career in bullfighting, but turned to acting after being badly gored by a bull.

In 1960, Silvestre starred in Las rosas del milagro, a historical drama set during the time of the Spanish conquest of the Aztec Empire.

Silvestre was married first to Leonor Plaza, a Venezuelan woman, but later divorced. He later married artistic representative Blanca Estela Limon, and from 2011, lived in California. Silvestre died in Coronado, California, on June 2, 2024, at the age of 98.

== Selected filmography ==
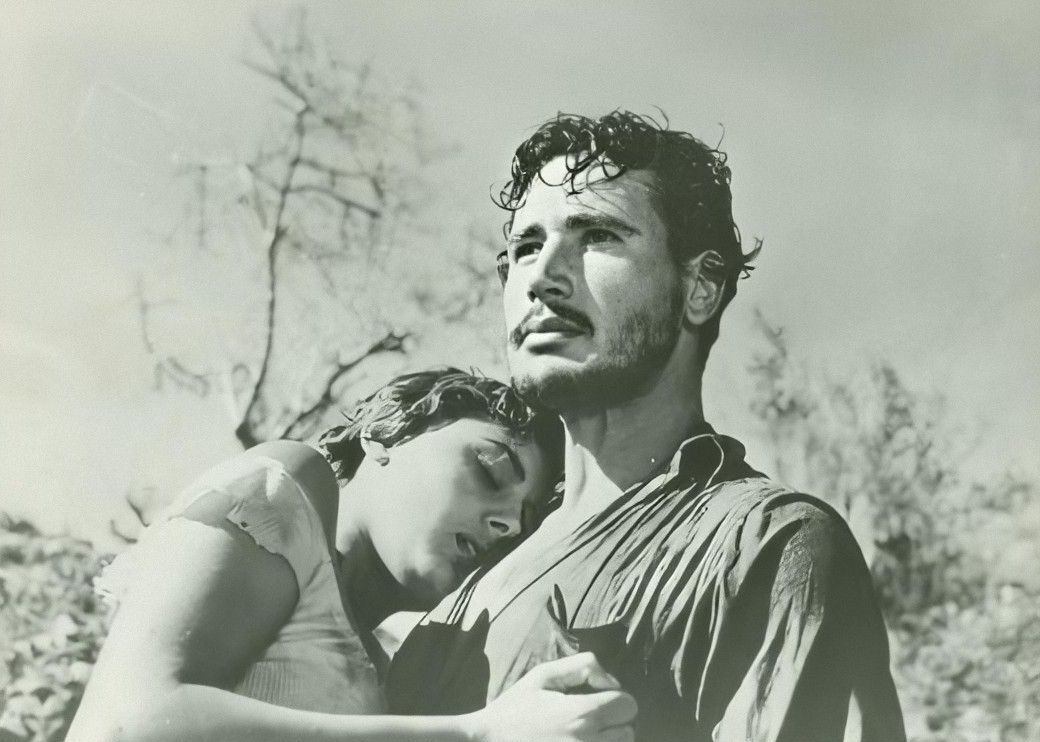
Silvestre with Rossana Podestà in Rossana (1953)

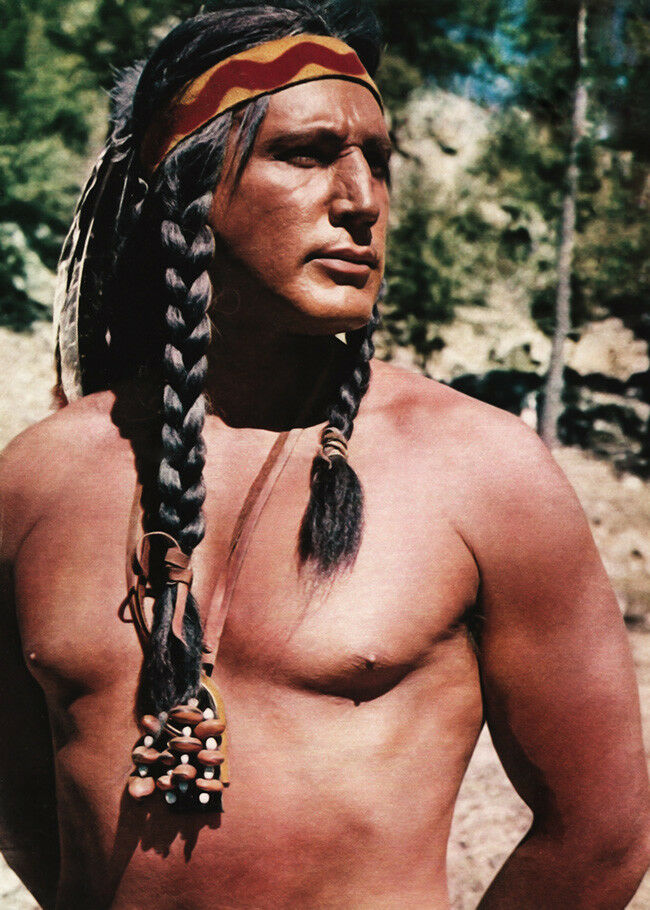
Silvestre in The Scalphunters (1968)

=== Films ===
- Lola Casanova (1948)
- Witch's Corner (1949)
- Wyoming Mail (1950)
- Here Comes Martin Corona (1952)
- Hiawatha (1952)
- Rossana (1953)
- Take Me in Your Arms (1954)
- The White Orchid (1954)
- Invincible Guns (1960)
- The Miracle Roses (1960)
- Santo Contra los Zombis (1961)
- Geronimo (1962)
- Kings of the Sun (1963)
- The Scalphunters (1968)
- Two Mules for Sister Sara (1970)
- Midnight Dolls (1979)

=== Television ===
Year	Title	Role	Notes
1952	Fireside Theatre	Tony	"Mirage" (Season 4, Episode 42)
1952	Schlitz Playhouse of Stars	Joe	"The House of Pride" (Season 2, Episode 11)
1961	Cuatro en la trampa	Unknown role	Recurring role
1966–1969	Daniel Boone	Jim Santee / Captain Torres / Gabriel	"The High Cumberland: Part 1" (Season 2, Episode 29); "The High Cumberland: Part 2" (Season 2, Episode 30); "A Very Small Rifle" (Season 6, Episode 1); "The Grand Alliance" (Season 6, Episode 7)
1968–1970	The F.B.I.	Carlos Lara / Miguel Ramos Valdez	"Out of Control" (Season 4, Episode 2); "Conspiracy of Corruption" (Season 5, Episode 18)
1970	Bracken's World	Manuel Rivas	"Miss Isabel Blue " (Season 2, Episode 15)
1971	D.A.: Conspiracy to Kill	Robert Ramirez	Television film
1971	Mannix	Sgt. Juan Rivas	"Catspaw" (Season 5, Episode 13)
1974	El chofer	Armando	Recurring role
1974	Ana del aire	Esteban	Recurring role
1976	The Quest	Medina	"Shanklin" (Season 1, Episode 3)
1976	Police Woman	Garcia	"The Lifeline Agency" (Season 3, Episode 7)
1977	Wonder Woman	Antonio Cruz	"Formula 407" (Season 1, Episode 12)
1978	La trampa	Jack	Recurring role
1980	No temas al amor	Marcos Darío	Recurring role
1984	Rituals	Enrique Santiago	Recurring role
1986	On Wings of Eagles	Randy	Recurring role
1989	Gideon Oliver	Dr. Felix Rodriguez	"By the Waters of Babylon" (Season 1, Episode 4)
1993	Capricho	León	Recurring role
1996	Azul	Ernesto	Recurring role
2014	La impostora	Leonidas Altamira	Lead role
2016	Despertar contigo	Silvestre	Recurring role
