= Marilú Elízaga =

Spanish actress

- Born: María Luisa Pérez-Caballero Moltó; August 27, 1909; Saltino, Italy
- Died: May 27, 1995 (aged 85); Spain
- Occupation: Actress

María Luisa Pérez-Caballero Moltó (1909–1995), commonly known by her stage name Marilú Elízaga, was a Spanish actress of Mexican theatre, television, and film.

In 1958, she was nominated for an Ariel Award for Best Actress for the film La culta dama, directed by Rogelio A. González.

== Selected filmography ==
- Los ricos también lloran (1979)
