= Alan Shayne =

- Born: November 21, 1925 (age 100); Boston, Massachusetts, U.S.
- Occupations: Casting director, actor, producer
- Years active: 1947–?
- Spouse(s): Jacqueline Babbin (1947–1955); Norman Sunshine (m. 2004)

Alan Shayne (born November 21, 1925) is an American casting director, actor, and producer.

== Early life and career ==
Shayne was born in Boston, Massachusetts on November 21, 1925. He started acting in theatre in the 1940s, where he encountered a young Marlon Brando in acting school. He appeared in the Broadway plays Antony and Cleopatra (1947–1948) and The Madwoman of Chaillot (1948–1950). In 1958, he was in the multiple Tony-nominated Broadway musical Jamaica. Throughout the 1950s and 1960s, he appeared in several television series such as The Philco Television Playhouse, Man Against Crime, and Kraft Television Theatre. In 1953, he portrayed Bernardo in the TV film Hamlet.

Having been encouraged by Michael Shurtleff, Shayne became a casting director in the 1960s. He recruited actors for films such as All the Way Home (1963), Johnny Belinda (1967), Catch-22 (1970), and All the President's Men (1976). In 1976, he became the president of Warner Bros. Television Studios, a position he held for ten years. He retired from the entertainment industry in the 1990s.

== Personal life ==
Shayne served in the United States Army during World War II. Between 1947 and 1955, he was married to Jacqueline Babbin. In 2004, he married graphic designer and visual artist Norman Sunshine, who had won a Primetime Emmy Award for Outstanding Main Title Design at the 28th Primetime Emmy Awards in 1976. He is openly homosexual.

Shayne and Sunshine co-authored Double Life: A Love Story from Broadway to Hollywood, their joint memoir about their fifty-year love story. It was published in print in 2011 by Magnus Books.

In 2023, he published his autobiography The Star Dressing Room: Portrait of an Actor.

== Television ==
Year	Title	Role	Notes
1950	Masterpiece Playhouse		Episode: "Othello"
1950	The Ford Theatre Hour	Donatello	Episode: "The Marble Faun"
1950	Lux Video Theatre	Joseph	Episode: "A Child Is Born"
1951	The Philco Television Playhouse	Kid	Episode: "Bulletin 120"
1951–52	Studio One	Ross/Joseph of Arimathea	Episodes: "Macbeth", "Pontius Pilate"
1951–1957	Kraft Television Theatre	Joseph/Unknown	Episodes: "Jane Eyre", "The Wren", "Justice", "A Child Is Born", "The Other Wise Man"
1952	Hallmark Hall of Fame	Frederic Chopin	Episode: "Prelude"
1952–53	Man Against Crime	Bill Weaver/Abel Jackson	Episodes: "Paradise Lost", "A Family Affair"
1953	Hamlet		TV film
1965	The Trials of O'Brien	Ned Wertimer	Episode: "No Justice for the Judge"
