= Santo Contra los Zombies =

1961 superhero film by Benito Alazraki

- Directed by: Benito Alazraki
- Written by: Benito Alazraki; Antonio Orellana; Fernando Osés
- Produced by: Alberto López
- Starring: Santo; Armando Silvestre; Jaime Fernández; Dagoberto Rodríguez
- Cinematography: José Ortiz Ramos
- Edited by: Jose Silva
- Distributed by: Azteca
- Release date: 1961
- Running time: 85 minutes
- Country: Mexico
- Language: Spanish

Santo contra los Zombies (also known as Santo vs. the Zombies) is a 1961 Mexican superhero horror film directed by Benito Alazraki. It depicts the popular character El Santo in a pulp-style film.

== Plot ==
After the police are unable to stop a crime wave by zombies, they turn to Santo for help.

== Cast ==
- Santo as Santo / the Saint
- Lorena Velázquez as Gloria Sandoval / Gloria Rutherford (English dubbed version)
- Armando Silvestre as Lt. Sanmartin / Lt. Savage
- Jaime Fernández as Det. Rodriguez
- Dagoberto Rodríguez as Det. Chief Almada
- Irma Serrano "La Tigresa" as Det. Isabel
- Carlos Agostí as Genaro / Uncle Herbert
- Ramón Bugarini as Rogelio / Roger, the male nurse
- Fernando Osés as Dorrell, zombified wrestler
- Eduardo Bonada
- Eduardo Silvestre
- Julián de Meriche
- Alejandro Cruz as Black Shadow, a wrestler (as Black Shadow)
- Gory Guerrero as Wrestler (as Gori Guerrero)
- Sugi Sito as Wrestler
- El Gladiador as Wrestler

== Release ==
This was one of the earliest Santo films and the first to be distributed in the US.

== Reception ==
Writing in The Zombie Movie Encyclopedia, academic Peter Dendle said, "The adventure movie with its comic-book plot, hero, and villain is fun to watch in an MST-3K spirit".
