= Happiness (1957 film) =

1957 Mexican film

- Directed by: Alfonso Corona Blake
- Written by: Emilio Carballido; Zacarías Gómez Urquiza
- Produced by: Gloria Lozano
- Starring: Elsa Cárdenas
- Cinematography: Rosalío Solano
- Release date: June 1957
- Running time: 100 minutes
- Country: Mexico
- Language: Spanish

Happiness (Spanish: Felicidad) is a 1957 Mexican drama film directed by Alfonso Corona Blake. It was entered into the 7th Berlin International Film Festival.

== Cast ==
- Elsa Cárdenas
- Carlos López Moctezuma
- Gloria Lozano
- Armando Sáenz
- Fanny Schiller
