= The Living Coffin =

- Directed by: Fernando Méndez
- Story by: Ramón Obón
- Produced by: K. Gordon Murray (English version); Alfredo Ripstein Jr. César Santos
- Starring: Gastón Santos; María Duval
- Cinematography: Víctor Herrera
- Edited by: Charles L. Kimball
- Music by: Gustavo César Carrión
- Production companies: Alameda Films; Young America Productions Inc.
- Distributed by: Alameda Films
- Release date: December 3, 1959
- Running time: 72 minutes
- Country: Mexico
- Language: Spanish

The Living Coffin (Spanish: El grito de la muerte/ Scream of Death) is a 1959 Mexican Western horror film directed by Fernando Méndez and starring Gastón Santos and María Duval. This is a only of the films in which Duval does not play any music theme on scene.

== Cast ==
- Gastón Santos as Gastón / Cowboy
- María Duval as María Elena García
- Pedro de Aguillón as Coyote Loco
- Carlos Anciraa as Felipe
- Carolina Barret as Clotilde
- Antonio Raxel as Doctor
- Hortensia Santoveña as Doña María
- Quintín Bulnes as Indio

== Release ==
The Living Coffin was released on DVD in April 2007.

== Reception ==
Bloody Disgusting rated it 3.5/5 stars and called it "an enjoyable—if somewhat dusty romp—through Mexico’s version of the old west." Bill Gibron of DVD Verdict wrote, "Though its mixture of horror and horse opera never quite succeeds, The Living Coffin is still an enjoyable example of Mexican madness. It may not give you the shivers, but it won't directly disappoint you either." Todd Brown of Twitch Film wrote, "The Living Coffin succeeds because it knows exactly what kind of film it is: this is pure b-film pulp." Glenn Erickson of DVD Talk wrote, "The film may not be scary, but it is occasionally funny."
