= The Curse of the Doll People =

Curse of the Doll People
- Directed by: Benito Alazraki
- Written by: Alfredo Salazar
- Produced by: Guillermo Calderón Stell; Guillermo Calderón
- Starring: Elvira Quintana; Ramón Gay
- Production company: Cinemagrafica Calderón
- Release date: 1961
- Running time: 81 minutes
- Country: Mexico
- Language: Spanish

The Curse of the Doll People (Spanish: Muñecos infernales lit. "Infernal Dolls"), or The Devil Doll Men, is a 1961 Mexican horror film directed by Benito Alazraki and starring Elvira Quintana and Ramón Gay.

It was produced by Cinematográfica Calderón S.A. The screenplay by Alfredo Salazar is an uncredited adaptation of the novel Burn Witch Burn! by A. Merritt.

== Plot ==
The story surrounds four men (Juan, Gilberto, Daniel and Luis, the leader of the expedition) who are cursed by Zandor, a voodoo priest for stealing a sacred idol from his jungle temple. Soon after returning home, the men are targeted for death by Zandor's human doll-like minions. These evil 'doll' people begin to kill the men and their family members. Dr. Karina Valdes, a doctor with a knowledge of voodoo works with her husband, Dr. Armando Valdes to stop the killings after two of the men die.

== Cast ==
- Elvira Quintana as Dr. Karina Valdes
- Ramón Gay as Dr. Armando Valdés
- Roberto G. Rivera as Mr. Molinar
- Quintin Bulnes as Zandor
- Alfonso Arnold as Agente Tomás
- Nora Veryán as Marta
- Luis Aragón as Daniel
- Jorge Mondragón as Luis Villegas
- Salvador Lozano as Gilberto
- Margarita Villegas as María, Luis' wife
- Norma Navarro as Anita
- Xavier Loyá as Juan
- Margarito Esparza as Muñeco (uncredited)
- Chel López as Agente policía (uncredited)
- Esther Martínez Peñate as Sirvienta (uncredited)
- Consuelo Molina as Nurse (uncredited)
- Gloria Oropeza as Nanny Rita (uncredited)

== Release ==
K. Gordon Murray imported the film to the US and added several English-language scenes.

== Reception ==
Writing in The Zombie Movie Encyclopedia, academic Peter Dendle criticized the American import as incoherent. Glenn Kay, who wrote Zombie Movies: The Ultimate Guide, called the film "a strictly by-the-numbers exercise that must have elicited more giggles than gasps on its release".
