= Elvira Quintana =

Spanish and Mexican actress (1935–1968)

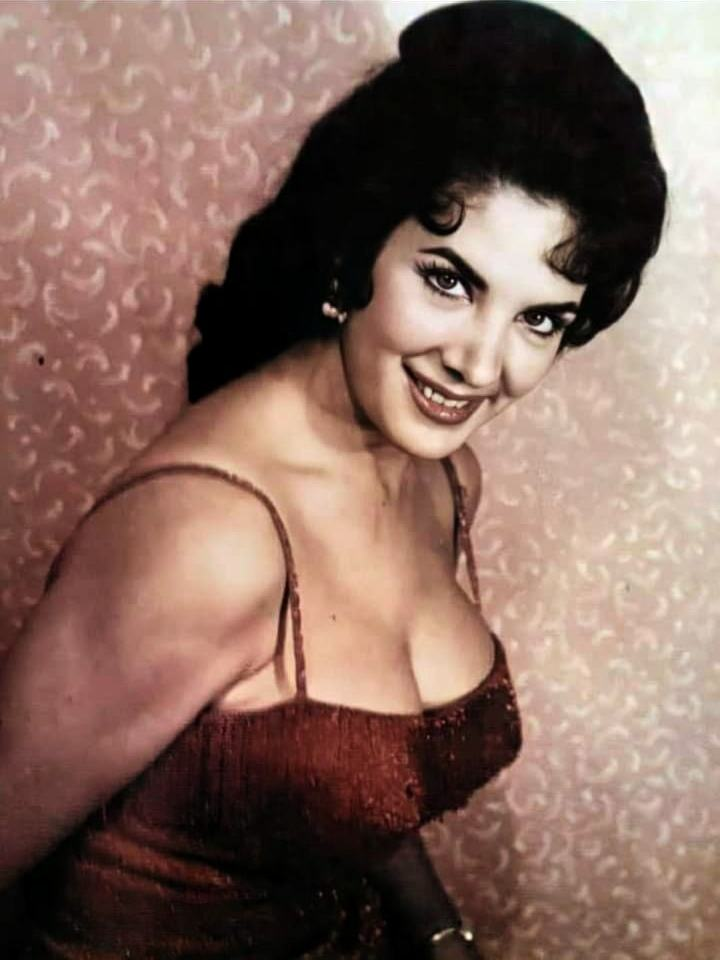
- Quintana, c. 1965
- Born: Elvira Catalina Quintana Molina; 7 November 1935; Montijo, Second Spanish Republic (now Spain)
- Died: 8 August 1968 (aged 32); Mexico City, Mexico
- Occupations: Actress; singer
- Years active: 1953–1968

Elvira Catalina Quintana Molina (7 November 1935 – 8 August 1968), known as Elvira Quintana, was a Spanish and Mexican actress and singer, specialized in the musical genres of bolero and ranchera.

== Early life and career ==
Born in Montijo, Spain, Quintana and her family migrated to Mexico when she was 5 years old. She began her career working in theatre and later participated in films as an extra. Her first important role was as Carmen Ochoa in "Una solución inesperada", a segment of the drama film Canasta de cuentos mexicanos (1956). She then enrolled in the National Association of Actors' theatre and film institute (Instituto Teatral y Cinematográfico). She was given her first starring role in El buen ladrón (1957) before her breakthrough in Bolero inmortal (1958), in which she debuted as a singer; the film's soundtrack album, for which she recorded songs, was a commercial success throughout Hispanic America. She starred opposite Pedro Armendáriz, her favorite actor, in Dos hijos desobedientes (1960). Greatly admired by audiences for her beauty and talent, she became one of the most popular Mexican performers of the 1960s. Her last appearances were in the telenovelas El dolor de amar (1966), in which she played a villain for the first time, and Felipa Sánchez, la soldadera (1967), in which the press declared she created "an unforgettable character" as the title role.

== Death and legacy ==
Quintana, who never married, suffered from pancreatic problems and kidney failure during her last months. She died of a stroke on 8 August 1968, in Mexico City; she was survived by her mother, Alejandra Molina, and her two siblings, Juana Quintana Molina and José Díaz Molina. She was interred at the Panteón Jardín on 9 August.

A street in Montijo, her hometown, is named after her.

== Filmography ==
- Sueños de gloria (1953)
- Look What Happened to Samson (1955)
- El vendedor de muñecas (1955)
- Furias desatadas (1957)
- Every Child a Cross to Bear (1957)
- Dangers of Youth (1960)
- Invincible Guns (1960)
- Revolver en Guardia (1960)
- The Curse of the Doll People (1961)
- Lástima de ropa (1962)
- Tres muchachas de Jalisco (1964)
- Me Llaman El Cantaclaro (1964)
- Tintansón Crusoe (1965)
- Las Tapatias nunca pierden (1965)

== Discography ==
=== Studio albums ===
- Bolero inmortal (1958)
- Diferente (1963)
- Toda una vida (1965)
- Acércate más (1966)

=== Compilation albums ===
- La inolvidable Elvira Quintana (1968)
