= Benito Alazraki =

Mexican film director

- Born: 27 October 1921; Mexico City, Mexico
- Died: 6 June 2007 (aged 85); Mexico City, Mexico
- Occupations: Film director Screenwriter
- Years active: 1955–1995
- Children: Carlos

Benito Alazraki (27 October 1921 – 6 June 2007) was a Mexican film director and screenwriter. He directed 40 films between 1955 and 1995. He was the father of advertising executive Carlos Alazraki and grandfather of director Gary Alazraki.

== Selected filmography ==
- Roots (1955)
- Where Are Our Children Going? (1958)
- Dangers of Youth (1960)
- Invincible Guns (1960)
- Rebel Without a House (1960)
- Muñecos infernales (1961)
- Santo Contra los Zombis (1961)
- Espiritismo (1961, released as Spiritism in the US), an adaptation of "The Monkey's Paw".
