= Casa de Mujeres =

1966 Mexican drama film

- Directed by: Julián Soler
- Written by: Enrique Suarez de Deza; Alberto Varela
- Produced by: Mauricio de la Serna; Jack Wagner
- Starring: Dolores del Río; Elsa Aguirre; Rosa María Vázquez; Marta Romero; Elsa Cárdenas; María Duval; Susana Cabrera
- Edited by: Rafael Ceballos
- Music by: Manuel Esperón
- Distributed by: Producciones Carlos Amador
- Release date: September 30, 1966
- Running time: 100 minutes
- Country: Mexico
- Language: Spanish

Casa de Mujeres ("House of Women"), also named El Hijo de Todas ("The Son of All"), is a 1966 Mexican drama film directed by Julián Soler and starring Dolores del Río, Elsa Aguirre, Rosa María Vázquez, Marta Romero, Elsa Cárdenas, María Duval and Susana Cabrera. This is the only film in which Duval does not sing music themes on scene, and the last in which Del Río starred in her native country.

== Plot ==
At a Christmas party seven women of a luxurious brothel all decide to become "mothers" to a baby boy born in a nearby home whose mother dies giving birth, and to reform.

The child grows up, and as a man informs them of his upcoming marriage. His "mothers" face the fear of being rejected and ostracized by their own son because of their previous lives as prostitutes.

== Details ==
Casa de Mujeres was the last film in which the legendary actress Dolores del Río starred in her native country. She played the role of a madame of a brothel. Del Río's performance in this movie shocked the public because of how she stood out among all the young actresses. The film was not a critical success, but it was very financially successful. One critic wondered: Has Mexican cinema come a long way from Santa to Casa de Mujeres?"

== Cast ==
- Dolores del Río as Gilda Moreno «La Doña», dueña del burdel
- Elsa Aguirre as Carmen «La Marinera»
- Rosa María Vázquez as Rutila / Ruth «La Mundial»
- Marta Romero as Sara
- Elsa Cárdenas as María «La Marquesa»
- María Duval as Lily
- Susana Cabrera as Alfonsina «La Ouija», encargada del burdel
- Carlos López Moctezuma as Inspector Canales
- Enrique Álvarez Félix as Manuel, adulto
- Fernando Soler as Dr. Michel
- Alfredo Wally Barrón as Gumaro
- María Bustamante as Señora Canales
- Queta Carrasco as Clienta de María
- Federico Falcón as Raúl
- Consuelo Frank as Señora Michel
- Federico González as Cliente
- Leonor Gómez as Mujer busca médico
- John Kelly as Cliente Gringo
- Inés Murillo as Vecina
- Jose Peña as Tendero español
- Mario Sevilla as Director de escuela
- Julián Soler as Director de película
