= María Duval (Mexican actress) =

Mexican actress and singer

- Born: María Dussauge Ortiz; 2 August 1937 (age 89); Querétaro, Mexico
- Occupations: Actress, singer
- Years active: 1955–1995
- Musical career
- Genres: Bolero; ranchera
- Instrument: Vocals
- Label: Peerless Records

María Dussauge Ortiz (born 2 August 1937), known professionalty as María Duval, is a Mexican actress and singer, specialized in the musical genres of bolero and ranchera.

== Career ==
Duval made her film debut in the musical Melodías inolvidables (1959), an experience she later described as "a great emotion" and her "favorite memory" of her entire career. She once said that musical was her favorite film genre. She played the romantic interests of the comedian actors, Adalberto Martínez "Resortes" in Del suelo no paso (1959), Eulalio González "Piporro" in Ruletero a toda marcha (1962), Gaspar Henaine "Capulina" in Barridos y regados (1963) and Marco Antonio Campos "Viruta" in Cada quién su lucha and La cigüeña distraída (both 1966).

She acted as Antonio Aguilar's beloved in two films: the Mexican Revolution drama Juan Colorado (1966), where she played the tragic Silvia Guerrero, and the comedy Los alegres Aguilares (1967). She finished her film career in the 1970s with the Blue Demon vehicle La mafia amarilla (1975). She also participated in television productions such as La voz de la tierra (1982) with Joaquín Cordero, Sergio Kleiner, Ana Bertha Lepe, Delia Magaña, and Teresa Velázquez. Her last appearance was in the telenovela María José (1995).

For her contributions to the motion picture and recording industries, Duval's handprints were embedded into the Paseo de las Luminarias in 1984. Those handprints would be joined by those of her niece, Consuelo, forty years later

== Personal life ==
María Duval is the aunt of comedian Consuelo Duval.

== Selected filmography ==
- The Life of Agustín Lara (1959)
- The Living Coffin (1959)
- Ruletero a toda marcha (1962)
- Santo vs. las Mujeres Vampiro (1962)
- Tres muchachas de Jalisco (1964)
- Gabino Barrera (1965)
- Nos lleva la tristeza (1965)
- Martín Romero El Rápido (1966)
- Cada quién su lucha (1966)
- Juan Colorado (1966)
- Casa de Mujeres (1966)
- La cigueña distraída (1966)
- Los Bandidos (1967)
- Los alegres Aguilares (1967)
- Pancho Tequila (1970)
- La otra mujer (1972)

== Discography ==
Singles

- "Todo y nada" (Peerless Records)

Studio albums

- Dos gallos y dos gallinas (RCA Víctor)
