= Tere Velázquez =

Mexican actress (1942–1998)

- Born: María de los Ángeles Teresa de Jesús Villar Dondé; 8 March 1942; Mexico City, Mexico
- Died: 7 January 1998 (aged 55); Mexico City, Mexico
- Other name: Tere Velázquez
- Years active: 1957-1996
- Family: Lorena Velázquez (sister)

María de los Ángeles Teresa de Jesús Villar Dondé, better known as Tere Velázquez (Spanish pronunciation: [teɾeˈ βeˈlaskes]; 8 March 1942 – 7 January 1998) was a Mexican actress, singer, dancer, model and presenter. She appeared in 86 films and television shows between 1957 and 1996.

She starred in the film Young People, which was entered into the 11th Berlin International Film Festival. She died on 7 January 1998 in Mexico City of colon cancer.

== Selected filmography ==
- La sombra del otro (1957)
- Golden Legs (1958)
- Sube y baja (1959)
- His First Love (1960)
- Dangers of Youth (1960)
- Young People (1961)
- The Rape of the Sabine Women (1962)
- El Valle de las espadas (1963)
- Corazón salvaje (1968)
- The Incredible Professor Zovek (1972)
- The Killer Must Kill Again (1975)
