= Lorena Velázquez =

Mexican actress (1937–2024)

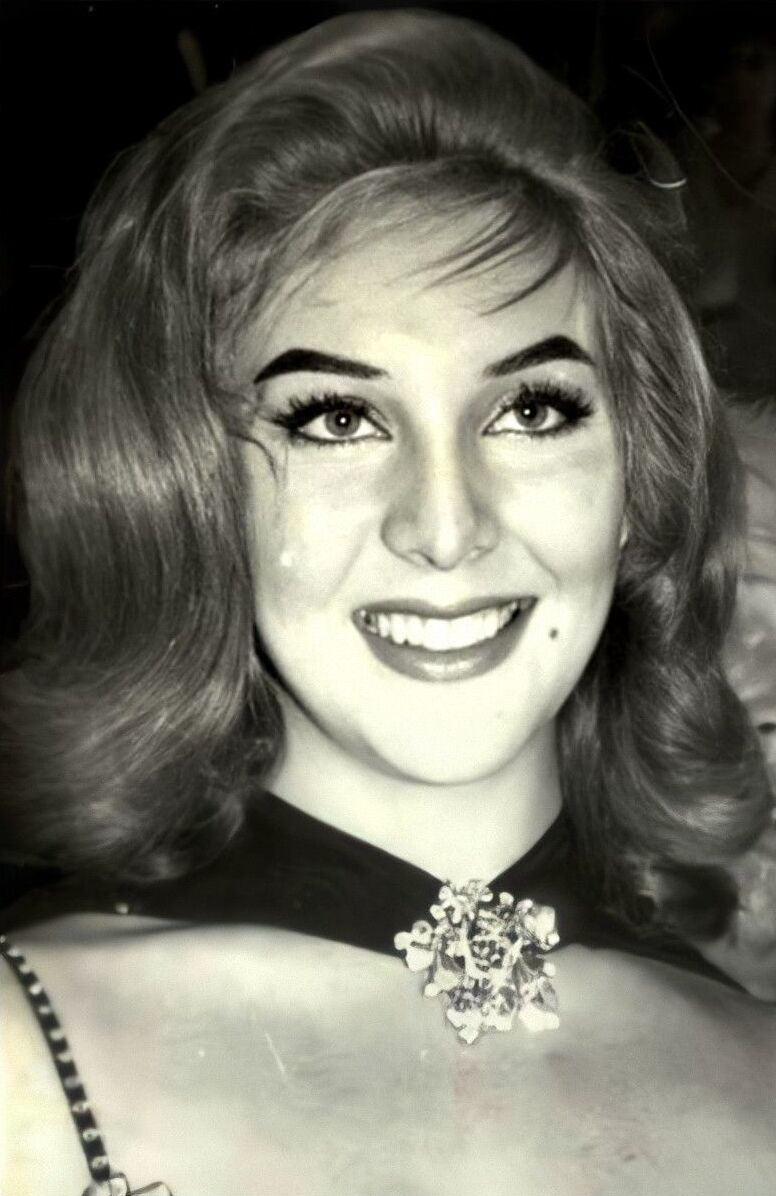
- Velázquez in 1959
- Born: María Concepción Villar y Dondé; 15 December 1939; Mexico City, Mexico
- Died: 11 April 2024 (aged 84); Mexico City, Mexico
- Occupation: Actress
- Years active: 1956–2020
- Spouse(s): Robert Taylor Morris (m. 1967; div. 1972) Eduardo Novoa (m. 1973; div. 1986)
- Children: 1
- Family: Tere Velázquez (sister)

María Concepción Villar y Dondé (15 December 1939 – 11 April 2024), professionally known as Lorena Velázquez, was a Mexican actress. Thanks to her recurring appearances in Mexican horror films, she established herself as a scream queen. The latter also earned her the title of "La Reina del Cine Fantástico" (spanish for, "Queen of Fantasy Cinema").

== Life and career ==
María Concepción Villar y Dondé was born on 15 December 1939 in Mexico City. She was the stepdaughter of actor Víctor Velázquez and the older sister of actress Teresa Velázquez. In 1958, she competed in Miss Mexico and placed second. Afterwards she was appointed Miss Mexico 1960, although she refused to represent Mexico in the Miss Universe pageant. She declined to do so because her artistic career had become her priority. She had multiple projects going on at the time including three films.

Velázquez played varied roles in the 1960's, from a vedette, to a cowgirl and even as the queen of vampires. She also played two antagonistic roles in a film, as queen of a faraway planet and her twin (picture). In the 1970's, she made the transition to television. Thereafter, she alternated between the large and small screens.

== Death ==
She died on 11 April 2024, at the age of 84.

== Filmography ==
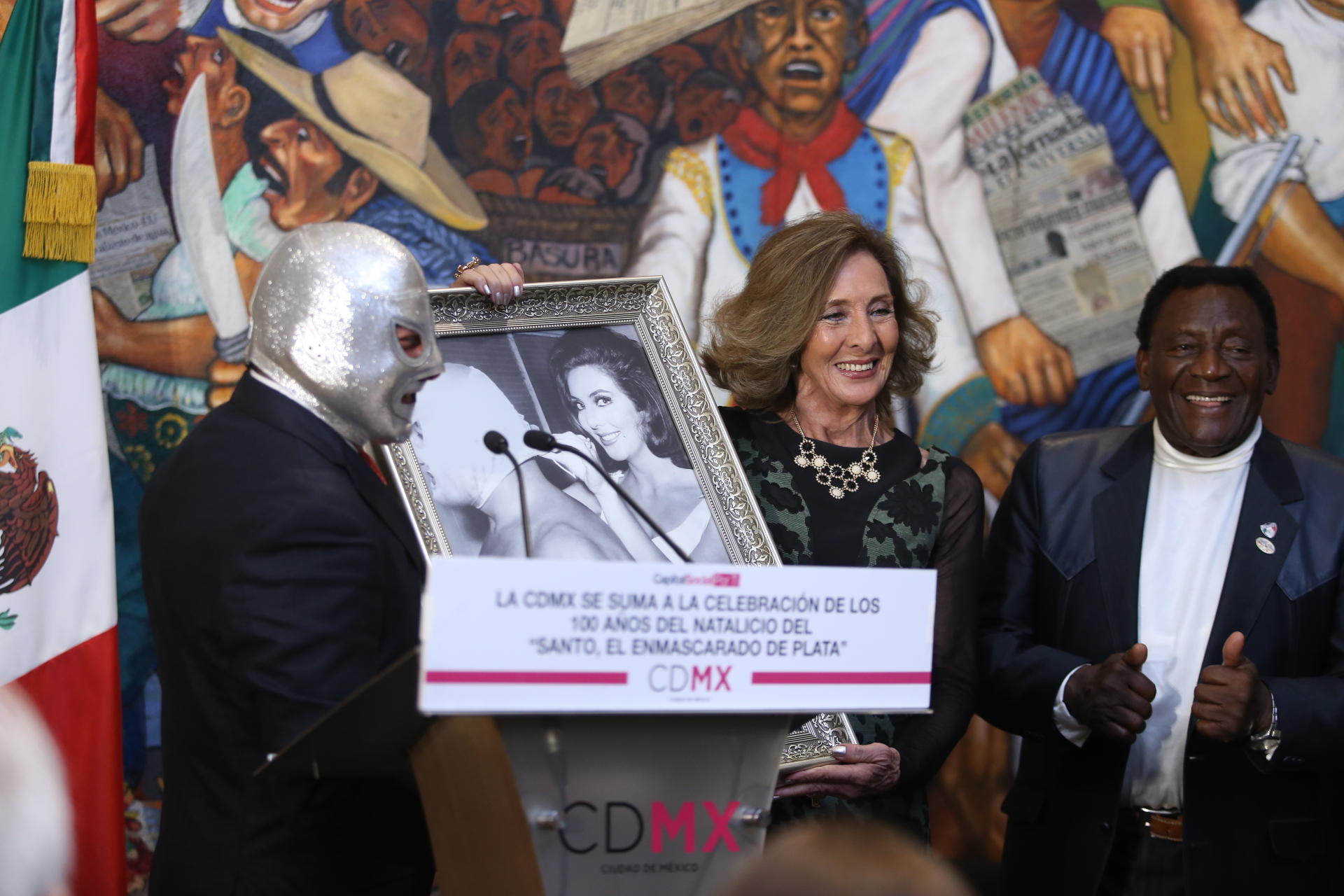
Left to right: El Hijo del Santo with Velázquez who holds a portrait in which she was photographed with El Santo during the celebration of the 100 years of the birth of "El Santo, El Enmascarado de Plata" in 2017

=== Film ===
- Caras nuevas (1955) as Waitress
- La Diana cazadora (1956) as Margarita
- The New World (1957)
- El Puma (1958) as Margarita
- La ley del más rápido (1958) as Margarita
- A tiro limpio (1958) as Margarita
- Tin Tan y las modelos (1959) as Rosita
- La vida de Agustín Lara (1959) as María Islas
- Ellas también son rebeldes (1959) as Irene Barreto
- La nave de los monstruos (1960) as Beta
- El rapto de las sabinas (1960) as Hersilia
- Ay Chabela! (1961) as Jenny
- Santo contra los zombies (1961) as Gloria Sandoval
- Santo vs. las mujeres vampiro (1962) as Zorina
- Las luchadoras vs. El Médico Asesino (1962) as Gloria Venus
- Milagros de San Martín de Porres (1963) as Minerva
- Tintansón Crusoe (1964) as Zoraya Caluya
- El hacha diabólica (1964) as Isabel de Arango
- Atacan las brujas (1964) as Elisa Cárdenas
- El planeta de las mujeres invasoras (1966) as Adastrea
- Fray Don Juan (1969) as Claudia
- Misión suicida (1971) as Ana Silvia
- El tesoro de Morgan (1974) as Dalia
- La Chilindrina en apuros (1994) as Doña Aldunza
- Reclusorio (1995) as Reina de la Garza
- Más sabe el diablo por viejo (2018) as Angélica Aguirre

=== Television ===
- Cumbres Borrascosas (1964) - Cathy
- Estafa de amor (1967) as Mayte
- Dulce desafío (1989) as Aida
- Mujer, casos de la vida real (1985–2007)
- Mi pequeña traviesa (1997) as Catalina
- El privilegio de amar (1998) as Rebeca
- Alma rebelde (1999) as Natalia
- La casa en la playa (2000) as Elena White
- Amigas y rivales (2001) as Itzel de la Colina
- Velo de novia (2003) as Adela Isabela
- Rubí (2004) as Mary Chavarria Gonsalez
- Muchachitas como tu (2007) as Teresa Linares
- Alma de hierro (2008) as Victoria
- Niña de mi corazón (2010) as Mercedes Riquelme
- Dos Hogares (2011-2012) as Carmela De Valtierra
- Mentir para vivir (2013)
- Que Pobres Tan Ricos (2014) as Chabelita
- Amores con trampa (2015) as Corina Bocelli
- La mexicana y el güero (2020) as Rose Somers
