= Santo vs. las Mujeres Vampiro =

1962 film by Alfonso Corona Blake

- Directed by: Alfonso Corona Blake
- Written by: Alfonso Corona Blake; Rafael García Travesi; Antonio Orellana; Fernando Osés
- Produced by: Alberto López
- Starring: Santo; María Duval; Lorena Velázquez; Ofelia Montesco
- Cinematography: José Ortiz Ramos
- Edited by: José W. Bustos
- Distributed by: Azteca Films Inc.
- Release dates: October 11, 1962 (Mexico); 1963 (U.S.)
- Running time: 89 minutes
- Country: Mexico
- Language: Spanish

Santo vs. las Mujeres Vampiro (also known as Samson vs. the Vampire Women) is a 1962 superhero horror film written and directed by Alfonso Corona Blake and starring Santo, María Duval, Lorena Velázquez and Ofelia Montesco. The film was featured on a 1995 episode of Mystery Science Theater 3000.

== Plot ==
A coven of hideously decayed vampire women awaken in their crypt after 200 years of sleep. Their leader, Queen Zorina, plans to return to Hell to be with her husband Lucifer, and must appoint a successor. Two hundred years earlier, the vampire priestess Tundra had attempted to capture a woman, but she escaped; Tundra now vows to capture the woman’s granddaughter, Diana. Tundra transforms into a beautiful young woman, so that she can infiltrate human society.

Diana is about to turn 21 and happily engaged to a man named George. That evening, Tundra appears outside her window and attempts to hypnotize her, but is interrupted by George and Diana’s father, Professor Orloff. Tundra transforms into a bat to escape. The professor worries that she is in danger because of an old family prophecy, though he does not tell Diana. He alerts the local inspector, Charles Andrews, but does not tell him the full story either. The professor contacts wrestler Santo to come to that evening’s costume ball to protect Diana.

After his wrestling match, Santo arrives in the professor’s office. The professor shows him the prophecy, which proves that Santo is the only person who can save Diana, just as his ancestor once saved her grandmother. Santo deduces that since vampires cannot survive in sunlight, they must have a lair, but the professor has been unable to decode that information from the prophecy. The vampires infiltrate the party and attempt to kidnap Diana, but Santo attacks the henchmen and they flee without her. In their lair, Tundra blames Santo for foiling their plan. Zorina scolds Tundra for failing once again, and decides to accompany her the next evening to ensure the job is successful.

The inspector comes up with a plan to send Diana out as bait, so they can follow the vampires to their lair and Santo can destroy them. However, one of the vampires’ henchmen disguises himself and steps into the ring to fight Santo. Santo narrowly defeats the masked henchman, whom he unmasks to reveal as a werewolf.

Even though the police are carefully watching Diana, Tundra and the henchmen attack and kidnap her. Santo arrives and fights off the henchmen, but Tundra has already escaped with Diana. The professor finally breaks a code in the prophecy, revealing the location of the vampires’ lair, and alerts Santo. Santo arrives at the crypt, but is captured alongside Diana. Once he is restrained, Tundra seizes the opportunity to know Santo’s true identity, and demands her henchmen unmask him. However, she is too late, as the sun rises behind her and she bursts into flames. Santo escapes and defeats the remaining henchmen, sets fire to the vampire women in their coffins, and frees Diana.

Outside the crypt, Diana is reunited with George and her father, and Santo speeds off in his convertible.

== Cast ==
- Santo as Santo
- Lorena Velázquez as Zorina, queen of the vampires
- María Duval as Diana Orloff
- Jaime Fernández as Inspector Carlos
- Augusto Benedico as Prof. Orloff
- Xavier Loyá as Jorge - Diana's fiancé
- Ofelia Montesco as Tundra, vampire priestess
- Fernando Osés as Vampire
- Guillermo Hernández as Vampire
- Nathanael León as Vampire
- Ricardo Adalid as Detective at Party
- Cavernario Galindo as himself
- Ray Mendoza as himself
- Alejandro Cruz as himself
- Bobby Bonales as himself
- Angelina Lewis as Roxanne, Santo's daughter

== Production ==
Although the previous Santo films hadn’t been successful at the box office, producer Alberto Lopez had engaged Santo in an exclusive contract for a series of four films. Lopez had previously produced Santo vs the Zombies, and would later produce Santo in the Wax Museum and Santo vs the Strangler, under this same contract. He attempted to raise the production value for this film, hiring respected cinematographer Jose Ortiz Ramos and composer Raul Lavista. Director Alfonso Corona Blake began shooting the film on January 3, 1962 at Estudios Churbusco in Mexico City, based on a script by Rafael Garcia Travesi, Antonio Orellana, and Fernando Oses. The film premiered on October 11, 1962 at the Mariscala Cinema, where it played for two weeks and earned significant profit.

Samson vs. the Vampire Women was one of four Santo films dubbed into English and released in the United States, and one of two Santo films released by K. Gordon Murray, a prolific distributor of Mexican films in the US. Murray’s films mainly played in theaters on weekend matinees intended for children, or on late-night television through his work for American International TV. For this film, Murray hired Manuel San Fernando to direct additional scenes and to supervise the English actors’ voice performances, but the structure and plot of both versions of the film are largely similar. Murray changed many of the character names to better appeal to an American audience, including changing “Santo” to “Samson,” a reference to the biblical strongman and then-popular character of Italian sword-and-sandal epics.

== Reception ==
=== Influence ===
Santo contra las mujeres vampiro was the first Santo film to receive significant international attention. In addition to its release in the United States, it also played at the 1965 Festival of San Sebastian in Spain.

The film was featured in the season 6 finale of Mystery Science Theater 3000. It was Frank Conniff's final episode before departing the series. The film was also featured on the television show Cinema Insomnia.
