= Elsa Cárdenas =

Mexican actress (born 1935)

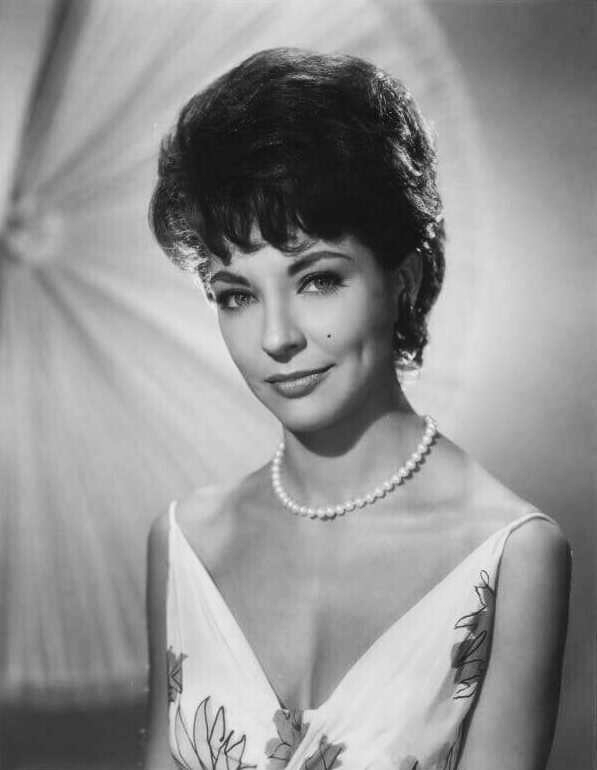
- Cárdenas in 1964
- Born: Elsa Cárdenas Renteria; 3 August 1935 (age 91); Baja California, Mexico
- Other names: Elsa Cardenas, Elsie Cardenas
- Occupation: Actress
- Years active: 1954–2015
- Spouse(s): Guy Preston Patton (m. 1957; div. 1958) Álvaro Torreblanca Otawi (m. 1975; died 2009)
- Partner: Budd Boetticher (1962–1964)
- Children: 1

Elsa Cárdenas Rentería (born 3 August 1935) is a Mexican actress.

In film, she is notable for: Giant (1956), Felicidad (1957), Fun in Acapulco (1963), Casa de mujeres (1966) y La señora Muerte (1969), while in telenovelas, she stand out with: El amor tiene cara de mujer (1971), Carrusel (1989), Alma rebelde (1999), La Otra (2002), Fuego en la sangre (2008) and Lo imperdonable (2015).

Thanks to her national and international career, Cárdenas became one of the few Mexican actresses to have belonged to two of the most important stages of cinema, that of her country of origin and that of the United States, these being the Golden Age of Mexican cinema and the classical Hollywood cinema.

== Career ==
She started her acting career in 1954, getting to appear in more than 100 films and television productions. She starred in the film Felicidad, which was entered into the 7th Berlin International Film Festival. She acted alongside many stars, including James Dean in Giant and Elvis Presley in Fun in Acapulco. She was formerly married to Houston independent oil operator Guy Preston Patton.

== Selected filmography ==
=== Film ===
- Giant (1956)
- The Brave One (1956)
- Felicidad (1957)
- ¡Paso a la juventud..! (1958)
- For the Love of Mike (1960)
- Of Love and Desire (1963)
- Fun in Acapulco (1963)
- Of Love and Desire (1963)
- Taggart (1964)
- Casa de Mujeres (1966)
- La señora Muerte (1969)
- The Wild Bunch (1969)
- La Pachanga (1981)

=== Television ===
- Have Gun – Will Travel (1959)
- Esmeralda (1997) - Hortencia Lazcano
- Mar de amor (2009) – Luciana de Irazabal
