= Eugenia Grandet (1953 film) =

1953 film by Emilio Gómez Muriel

- Directed by: Emilio Gómez Muriel
- Written by: Julio Alejandro; Emilio Gómez Muriel; Arduino Maiuri
- Based on: Eugenia Grandet by Honoré de Balzac
- Produced by: Modesto Pascó; Emilio Tuero
- Starring: Marga López; Julio Villarreal; Andrea Palma
- Cinematography: José Ortiz Ramos
- Edited by: Fernando Martínez
- Music by: Gonzalo Curiel
- Production company: Filmadora Argel
- Distributed by: Clasa-Mohme
- Release date: 23 September 1953
- Running time: 106 minutes
- Country: Mexico
- Language: Spanish

Eugenia Grandet is a 1953 Mexican drama film directed by Emilio Gómez Muriel and starring Marga López, Julio Villarreal and Andrea Palma. It is based on the 1833 French novel Eugénie Grandet by Honoré de Balzac with the setting shifted from nineteenth century France to mid-twentieth century Mexico. It was shot at the Tepeyac Studios in Mexico City. The film's sets were designed by the art director Francisco Marco Chillet.

== Cast ==
- Marga López as Eugenia Grandet
- Julio Villarreal as Don Eugenio Grandet
- Andrea Palma as Matilde Grandet
- Ramón Gay as Carlos Grandet
- Hortensia Santoveña as Ana, sirvienta (maid)
- José Pidal as Señor Santiesteban, banquero (banker)
- Enrique Díaz 'Indiano' as Pedro López, notario (notary)
- Armando Velasco as Padre Agustín (Father Agustín)
- Alberto Carrière as Socio de Carlos (Carlos' associate)
- Lilia Fernández as Laura
- Irlanda Mora as Esposa de Carlos (Carlos' wife)
- Ángel Merino as Luis Santiesteban
- Rafael Estrada as Sobrino de padre Agustín (Father Agustín's nephew)
- Victorio Blanco as Socio de don Eugenio (Don Eugenio's associate)
- Rodolfo Calvo as Médico (doctor)
- León Barroso as Cartero (letter carrier)
- José Chávez as Mayordomo (butler)
- María Gentil Arcos as Señora Santiesteban
- Elodia Hernández as Madre de Laura (Laura's mother)
- Elvira Lodi as Mujer en aeropuerto (woman in airport)
- Pepe Nava as Transeúnte (passerby)
- Carlos Robles Gil as Hombre busca prestamo (man seeking loan)

== Bibliography ==
- Goble, Alan. The Complete Index to Literary Sources in Film. Walter de Gruyter, 1999.
