= The Robot vs. the Aztec Mummy =

- Mexican theatrical release poster
- Directed by: Rafael Portillo
- Screenplay by: Alfredo Salazar
- Story by: Guillermo Calderón; Alfredo Salazar
- Produced by: Guillermo Calderón
- Starring: Ramon Gay; Rosita Arenas; Crox Alvarado; Luis Aceves Castañeda; Arturo Martínez
- Cinematography: Enrique Wallace
- Edited by: Jorge Bustos
- Music by: Antonio Díaz Conde
- Distributed by: Cinematografica Calderon S.A
- Release date: 1958
- Running time: 65 minutes
- Country: Mexico
- Language: Spanish

The Robot vs. the Aztec Mummy (Spanish: La Momia Azteca contra el Robot Humano) is a 1958 Mexican science fiction horror film directed by Rafael Portillo, and starring Ramón Gay and Rosa Arenas. It is the third installment in a trilogy preceded by The Aztec Mummy and The Curse of the Aztec Mummy, and a large portion of the film is an extended recap of the events from the first two entries. The three films were all shot consecutively.

The film remained in obscurity until late 1989, when it was featured as the second nationally broadcast episode of movie-mocking television series Mystery Science Theater 3000.

== Plot ==
The evil Dr. Krupp, a mad scientist also known as the Bat, managed to escape the snake pit into which he was thrown by Popoca the Aztec Mummy and continues his efforts to steal a valuable Aztec treasure from Popoca's tomb. Krupp builds a robot with a human head and brain in it, planning to use it to destroy the mummy should he return to thwart his plans. Krupp's former colleague and original finder of the mummy, Dr. Eduardo Almada, his new wife Flora Sepúlveda and his associate Pinacate (who has given up his masked superhero career as the Angel) all work to stop Dr. Krupp from completing his plans.

Dr. Krupp gets inside Popoca's tomb and once again steals the gold breastplate from its resting place on Popoca's chest. When Popoca awakens in a rage, Krupp orders his human robot to fight him. The two monsters engage in a fierce struggle to the death, but the robot's ability to deliver burns due to electrical shocks from its hands quickly begins to wear Popoca out. Just as it seems the robot is winning, Dr. Almada bursts into the tomb and knocks the remote control from Dr. Krupp's hands, effectively shutting off the robot's brain. In an insane rage, Popoca attacks the robot, tearing it into scrap metal. Popoca strangles Dr. Krupp and his henchman Tierno, then stumbles off into another tomb where he can return to his rest.

== Cast ==
- Ramón Gay as Dr. Eduardo Almada
- Rosa Arenas as Flora Sepúlveda Almada / Xochitl
- Crox Alvarado as Pinacate
- Luis Aceves Castañeda as Dr. Krupp / El Murciélago
- Jaime González Quiñones as Pepe Almada
- Ángel di Stefani as Popoca
- Arturo Martínez as Tierno
- Emma Roldán as Maria
- Julián de Meriche as Commandante de Policia
- Jesús Murcielago Velázquez as El Murciélago
- Enrique Yáñez as Esbirro del Murciélago
- Firpo Segura as Esbirro del Murciélago

== Production notes ==
While most science fiction takes poetic license with the understanding of science, this film also takes great liberty regarding Mesoamerican civilizations, suggesting the Aztecs practiced mummification and used hieroglyphic writing. In reality, they used pictographs and practiced cremation and simple burial. It was the Inca civilization that practiced mummification and the Maya who used syllabic writing. Also, the mummy Popoca (Ángel di Stefani) is depicted in the Egyptian style (upright or lying on its back) rather than in the Inca style (hunched into a ball with its feet pulled to the body and its knees close to the face).

The film was only distributed in 1958 in Mexico by Azteca Films Inc. in its original Spanish language version. English-language dubbing rights were subsequently acquired by entrepreneur K. Gordon Murray, who theatrically distributed the film nationally in 1964 on a double feature bill with The Vampire's Coffin (El Ataud del Vampiro), as Young America Productions Inc. Subsequently, he syndicated it to TV as one of a package of dubbed Mexican horror films which eventually gained a following in the U.S. through their appearance on the USA Network.

== Critical reception ==
Contemporary reviews of the film, or other articles concerning it, have not been located.

Three decades after its release, the TV program Mystery Science Theater 3000 riffed the film in the second episode of the first season, which aired for the first time in 1989. The Canadian comedy series This Movie Sucks! featured an edited version of the film in its second season in 2010.

== Home media ==
The film made its debut on DVD on July 30, 2002, where it was released by Alpha Video. It was re-released again on March 12, 2003 by Beverly Wilshire. It was later released in The Aztec Mummy Collection, a 3-disc box set which included the previous two films in the series. It was last released in 2013 and 2014 by Willette Acquisition Corp. and VCI Entertainment, respectively.

== Related films ==
- The Aztec Mummy (1957), released as Attack of the Mayan Mummy in the U.S.
- The Curse of the Aztec Mummy (1957)
- The Wrestling Women vs. the Aztec Mummy (1964), which featured a similar Aztec mummy named Tezomoc
- Mil Mascaras vs. the Aztec Mummy (2007)
