= Cinnamon Skin (film) =

1953 film

- Directed by: Juan José Ortega
- Written by: Julio Alejandro; Juan José Ortega; Mane Sierra
- Produced by: Ramón Peón; Juan José Ortega
- Starring: Sara Montiel; Manolo Fábregas; Ramón Gay
- Cinematography: Manuel Gómez Urquiza
- Edited by: José W. Bustos
- Music by: Gonzalo Curiel
- Production company: Compañía Cinematográfica Mexicana
- Release date: 6 August 1953
- Running time: 82 minutes
- Country: Mexico
- Language: Spanish

Cinnamon Skin (Spanish: Piel canela) is a 1953 Mexican drama film directed by Juan José Ortega and starring Sara Montiel, Manolo Fábregas and Ramón Gay. It was set and partly filmed in Cuba.

In Havana, gangster moll and singer Marucha, who has had a disfigured face since childhood, is helped by a plastic surgeon who falls madly in love with her. The doctor hopes to reform her and turn her into a good woman by transforming her face through surgeries. However Marucha, with her new beautiful face, has other plans and becomes a night club entertainer and a highly paid prostitute.

== Cast ==
- Sara Montiel as Marucha
- Manolo Fábregas as Dr. Carlos Alonso
- Ramón Gay as Julio Chávez
- Felipe de Alba as Dr. Jorge Morales
- Rosa Elena Durgel as Alicia Álvarez, enfermera
- Fernando Casanova as Paco
- Magda Donato as Paciente loca de Alonso
- Salvador Quiroz as Don Ernesto
- Ismael Larumbe as Antonio Salas Porras
- Jorge Casanova
- Arturo Corona as Amigo de Antonio
- Manuel de la Vega as Amigo de Antonio
- Pedro Vargas as Cantante
- Rosita Fornés as Cantante
- Julio Gutiérrez
- Olga Chaviano as Bailarina
- Victorio Blanco as Empleado casino
- Josefina Burgos as Mujer en casino
- Rogelio Fernández as Esbirro de Julio
- Ana Bertha Lepe as Empleada carpa
- Chel López as Detective
- José Muñoz as Cantinero
- Rafael A. Ortega
- Ignacio Peón as Hombre en casino
- Alicia Reyna as Mesera
- Joaquín Roche as Espectador gritón carpa

== Bibliography ==
- Rogelio Agrasánchez. Cine Mexicano: Posters from the Golden Age, 1936-1956. Chronicle Books, 2001.
