= The Aztec Mummy =

- Mexican theatrical release poster
- Spanish: La Momia Azteca
- Directed by: Rafael Portillo
- Written by: Alfredo Salazar; Guillermo Calderón
- Produced by: Guillermo Calderon
- Starring: Ramón Gay; Rosita Arenas; Crox Alvarado; Luis Aceves Castañeda; Arturo Martínez; Jorge Mondragón
- Cinematography: Enrique Wallace
- Edited by: Jorge Bustos
- Music by: Antonio Díaz Conde
- Production company: Cinematográfica Calderón S.A.
- Distributed by: Azteca Films Inc.
- Release date: November 13, 1957
- Running time: 80 minutes
- Country: Mexico
- Language: Spanish

The Aztec Mummy (Spanish: La Momia Azteca) is a 1957 Mexican adventure horror film produced by Guillermo Calderon from his own story idea, scripted by Alfredo Salazar, and directed by Rafael Portillo. The plot centers on a group of scientists who uncover a secret Aztec tomb through past-life regression, only to awaken an ancient warrior who has been cursed to guard the tomb and its hidden treasures. It is the first of a trilogy featuring the titular character, all filmed back-to-back in order to increase potential profit.

== Plot ==
Dr. Eduardo Almada, a scientist with controversial views on hypnosis and past lives, presents his theories before a group of neuropsychiatrists and is met with extreme skepticism. Realizing he needs proof in order to convince others of his theories, Almada decides to conduct an experiment on his fiancée Flor Sepúlveda, which he does reluctantly after she volunteers. Unbeknownst to the couple, they are spied upon by a master criminal known as The Bat, secretly Almada's academic rival Dr. Krupp. Under hypnosis, Flor reveals her past life as the ancient Aztec woman Xochitl who was selected by her people to be sacrificed to the god Tezcatlipoca. Before she was to be sacrificed, Xochitl was discovered in the romantic embrace of warrior Popoca and severely punished for this offense. Popoca, for his "corruption" of the virginal Xochitl, is buried alive and cursed to spend eternity guarding two sacred relics entombed with him, a golden breastplate and armband which serve as keys to a vast hidden treasure. Xochitl herself is also sacrificed and buried in the same tomb alongside her lover.

Realizing the validity of his theory, Almada resolves to find the tomb of Xochitl and recover the artifacts as proof for his theory. Upon enlisting the help of several other scientists, the group set off to find the tomb using Flor's past-life memories. Eventually discovering the tomb's secret entrance, the group enters the burial chambers and uncovers the bones of Xochitl and the sacred artifacts. Retrieving the breastplate, the group leaves, not noticing Popoca has reanimated and is following them. Arriving back in Mexico City, Almada presents his discovery to the group of scientists who further uncover a series of hieroglyphics etched into the breastplate telling of a vast treasure that can be unlocked using the armband which reveals its location. Before the group sets forth to retrieve the armband, Popoca arrives and attacks the group who barely manages to escape.

Meanwhile, The Bat, having been spying on the group the entire time, sends some of his henchmen to retrieve the breastplate which the group has taken to Flor's house in their escape from Popoca. The henchmen's assault on the group is cut short by the arrival of Popoca, who slaughters the men before retrieving the breastplate and abducting Flor, whom he recognizes as the reincarnation of Xochitl. Popoca makes his way back to the tomb, intent on sacrificing Flor to Tezcatlipoca in order to appease the god and end his curse of immortality.

The ritual is cut short by the arrival of Almada, who manages to hold the enraged Popoca at bay with a crucifix while Flor is rescued. Breaking from the hold the crucifix has over him, Popoca lunges towards them but seemingly perishes as Almada's friend Dr. Sepúlveda sacrifices himself by igniting nearby dynamite, collapsing the entire tomb onto both of them. Free from her past self, Flor returns to civilization with Almada. The two then expose Dr. Krupp as The Bat who is then arrested by the police.

== Cast ==
- Ramón Gay as Dr. Eduardo Almada
- Rosita Arenas as Flor Sepúlveda / Xochitl
- Crox Alvarado as Pinacate
- Luis Aceves Castañeda as Dr. Krupp / El Murciélago
- Jaime Gonzalez Quinones as Pepe Almada
- Jorge Mondragón as Dr. Sepúlveda
- Ángel di Stefani as Popoca
- Arturo Martínez as Tierno
- Stella Indo as Aztecan Chanteuse
- Emma Roldán as Maria

== Production ==
Development for The Aztec Mummy began in early 1957, at the end of a Golden Age in Mexican cinema when films put out had been celebrated internationally in the film industry, beginning in 1939. Mexican writer Alfredo Salazar, brother to actor and producer Abel Salazar. had spent most his career up to this point writing comedies. Wishing to distance himself from the genre and viewing the financial success of Universal Pictures' monster movies, Salazar decided to make his next project a horror film. Borrowing heavily from Universal's The Mummy (1932), Salazar replaced the ancient Egyptians from Universal's 1932 film, with the more localized Aztec culture, so to avoid any potential copyright lawsuits. The film would mark the second collaboration between Salazar and director Guillermo Calderon, having previously collaborated on the 1953 comedy film The Ghost Falls In Love, alongside actor Ramón Gay.

Story elements from Universal's film, such as the ancient romance, reincarnation, and the image of a shambling mummy were developed into Salazar's script, with Salazar altering the reincarnation element into the past life regression theory, recently made popular through the case of Bridey Murphy, who claimed to have lived a past life. Salazar further devised the idea of the film as the first of a trilogy featuring Popoca, shot back-to-back in order to cut costs and increase profits. Principal photography commenced in March of 1957 for a period of two months, with the cast and crew members shooting all three films inside Mexico's newly built Estudios Cinematográfica Latino Americana S.A. (Clasa Studios) in Mexico City. Some commentators have noted the design of the title character Popoca closely resembles that of the Mummies of Guanajuato, a number of naturally mummified bodies that had become a popular tourist attraction since the early 1900s.

== Release ==
The Aztec Mummy was released theatrically in Mexico on November 13, 1957.

=== Home media ===
The film was not given a home media release for decades after its initial theatrical release, with exposure gained from occasional television screenings and bootleg copies. It was released for the first time on DVD by BCI Eclipse as a three-disk box set of the entire "Aztec Mummy" trilogy on December 26, 2006. Special features included a still gallery of promotional artwork and still photographs of the entire series, in addition to an eight-page booklet with an essay on the trilogy by David Wilt. It was later released by Navarre Corporation, as a single-disk collection of the entire trilogy, released on February 24, 2009. This copy of the film has since gone out of print.

The film was omitted from The Aztec Mummy Collection Blu-ray, when it was released by VCI Entertainment on July 19, 2022. This release includes The Curse of the Aztec Mummy, The Robot vs. the Aztec Mummy and Wrestling Women vs. the Aztec Mummy but does not include the original The Aztec Mummy.

=== Reception ===
The Aztec Mummy was not widely reviewed by mainstream critics, with existing international reviews noting the film's low budget and bizarre storyline.

TV Guide highlighted the film's low production values and offbeat storyline, calling it "one of the strangest mummy movies ever made". David Maine of entertainment website PopMatters gave the film a mixed review, commending the cinematography of the temple sequences and "lively" soundtrack. However, Maine would criticize the erratic pacing and weak subplot involving The Bat (Luis Aceves Castañeda).

== Legacy ==
The commercial success of The Aztec Mummy would spawn a series of exploitation films imitating Universal's monster movies, the first of which would be El Vampiro (1957), modeled after Universal's Dracula series and released the same year as Salazar's film. The film has since gained a small cult following over the years and is now considered a cult classic.

=== Sequels ===
The film was the first in a trilogy starring the mummy Popoca (Ángel di Stefani), having been written and filmed back to back at the same time as La Momia Azteca. Each sequel would incorporate different genres into its storylines, though these later entries would be given more negative reviews by critics, who highlighted the increasingly poor quality, and overuse of flashbacks. The first sequel, The Curse of the Aztec Mummy was released the same year. Unlike its predecessor, the sequel would incorporate the increasingly popular Luchador film genre into its storyline, featuring the Mexican wrestler Crox Alvarado as the masked superhero known as El Ángel.

The final entry in the series was released in 1958, titled The Robot vs. The Aztec Mummy, would incorporate elements of science fiction, with Popoca battling a robot built by the series reoccurring antagonist Dr. Krupp.

=== Attack of the Mayan Mummy ===
In 1963, American producer Jerry Warren acquired international rights to the film. Cutting a significant amount of the original film, Warren shot new scenes featuring American actors, editing it into a new film titled Attack of the Mayan Mummy. The plot of the Americanized version, though retaining some of the original's storyline, would significantly alter major sequences in the film. The resulting version, cut down to 77 minutes as opposed to the original's 80-minute runtime, was released as a double-feature alongside a similarly "Americanized" foreign film Creature of the Walking Dead. Both were largely ignored by mainstream critics, with reviews that exist being largely negative.

Warren would implement the same business practice some years later, splicing scenes from The Aztec Mummy and the Mexican comedy horror film La Casa del Terror (1959) into newly filmed sequences featuring Lon Chaney Jr. The resulting film, titled Face of the Screaming Werewolf (1965).

== See also ==
- Mil Mascaras vs. the Aztec Mummy (2009)- A lucha libre film that pays homage to La Momia Azteca.
- Aztec Revenge (2015)- Sequel to the 2009 film.

== Bibliography ==
- Amador, María; Blanco, Jorge (1985). Cartelera cinematográfica, 1950-1959 (in Spanish). University Center for Cinematographic Studies. ISBN 978-9-6883-7327-9.
- Beezley, William (December 1, 2020). Latin American Cultural Objects and Episodes. John Wiley & Sons. ISBN 978-1-1190-7807-4.
- Cotter, Robert (June 14, 2015). The Mexican Masked Wrestler and Monster Filmography. McFarland & Company. ISBN 978-1-4766-0419-0.
- Craig, Rob (March 5, 2019). American International Pictures: A Comprehensive Filmography. McFarland & Company. ISBN 978-1-4766-6631-0.
- Dixon, Wheeler (August 24, 2010). A History of Horror. Rutgers University Press. ISBN 978-0-8135-5039-8.
- Glaser, Ed (March 7, 2022). How the World Remade Hollywood: Global Interpretations of 65 Iconic Films. McFarland & Company. ISBN 978-1-4766-4467-7.
- Glut, Donald (September 11, 2015). The Frankenstein Archive: Essays on the Monster, the Myth, the Movies, and More. McFarland & Company. ISBN 978-0-7864-8069-2.
- Greene, Doyle (January 28, 2015). Mexploitation Cinema: A Critical History of Mexican Vampire, Wrestler, Ape-Man and Similar Films, 1957-1977. McFarland & Company. ISBN 978-1-4766-0072-7.
- Hutchings, Peter (September 2, 2009). The A to Z of Horror Cinema. Scarecrow Press. ISBN 978-0-8108-7050-5.
- Milne, Tom; Willemen, Paul (1995). The Overlook Film Encyclopedia: Horror (2nd ed.). The Overlook Press. ISBN 978-0-8795-1624-6.
- Onstott, Jane (2006). National Geographic Traveler: Mexico. National Geographic Books. ISBN 978-0-7922-5319-8.
- Ray, Fred (January 1, 1991). The New Poverty Row: Independent Filmmakers as Distributors. McFarland & Company. ISBN 978-0-8995-0628-9.
- Senn, Bryan (March 5, 2019). "Twice the Thrills! Twice the Chills!": Horror and Science Fiction Double Features, 1955-1974. McFarland & Company. ISBN 978-1-4766-6894-9.
- Weaver, Tom; Brunas, John (December 20, 2011). Universal Horrors: The Studio's Classic Films, 1931-1946 (2nd ed.). McFarland & Company. ISBN 978-0-7864-9150-6.
