= Murciélago Velázquez =

Mexican professional wrestler (1910 – 1972)

- Velázquez wearing the Mexican National Middleweight Championship

Personal information
- Born: Jesús Velázquez Quintero; February 22, 1910 Dolores Hidalgo, Guanajuato, Mexico
- Died: May 26, 1972 (aged 62) Mexico City, Mexico
- Cause of death: Cirrhosis

Professional wrestling career
- Ring name(s): El Murciélago Enmascarado; Murciélago Velázquez
- Billed height: 170 cm (5 ft 7 in)
- Billed weight: 75 kg (165 lb)
- Trained by: Casino de la Policía
- Debut: April 18, 1938
- Retired: 1956

Jesús Velázquez Quintero (February 22, 1910 – May 26, 1972), better known under the ring names El Murciélago Enmascarado (Note: Literally translated as "Bat", Murciélago was a legendary fighting bull whose amazing fighting spirit during a corrida in Córdoba, Spain on 5 October 1879 led to its his life being spared, becoming a byword for gallantry and indomitable courage in the Spanish-speaking world.) and Murciélago Velázquez, was a Mexican professional wrestler. Velázquez was the fourth professional wrestler in Mexico to wear a mask and the second Mexican to work as an masked wrestler in the history of professional wrestling in Mexico. He became the first wrestler in Mexico to be forced to unmask, losing a Lucha de Apuestas (or "Bet match") to Octavio Gaona, creating the most prestigious match type in his native country. He once held the Mexican National Middleweight Championship and after his retirement was the head of the Mexico City boxing and wrestling commission for a while.

Near the end of his in-ring career, Velázquez began acting in various Mexican films, including several luchador films, working both with two legends of professional wrestling as El Santo and Blue Demon. He also became involved in the creative aspects of movie making, writing several screenplays and stories over the years. The last movie he wrote the story for, La mujer del diablo, opened two years after his death.

== Professional wrestling career ==
Jesús Velázquez made his professional wrestling debut on April 3, 1938 in the original Arena México, working for Empresa Mexicana de Lucha Libre (EMLL). He started out his career wrestling as the enmascarado (Masked) character "El Murciélago Enmascarado". Velázquez was the fourth wrestler in Mexico to wrestle in a mask, and the second Mexican wrestler to do so, second only to "El Enmascarado" (The Masked Wrestler). Velázquez was one of the first native Mexicans to really play up the show aspects of lucha libre, wearing a black leather vest with a hood as he would stalk towards the ring and wrestle in black trunks and mask. His entrance theatrics would at times include him hiding a couple of live bats under his vest, releasing them in the arena during his in-ring introduction, letting them fly free among the audience. His rough, brutal in-ring wrestling style added to the aura of El Murciélago Enmascarado, quickly pushing him up the rankings as he was wrestler that drew fans by the fact that they wanted to see him lose. Within a few months of his debut he was wrestling against some of the top names in EMLL such as Bobby Bonales and Dientes Hernández. One of the defining moments of Velázquez' early career was his storyline feud with Merced Gómez that began only a few weeks after his debut. During a match against Gómez a kick from Velázquez hit Gómez in the face, knocking him down. Moments later the crowd was shocked to discover that Gómez' eye was missing, supposedly from the brutal kick from Velázquez. Gómez had actually lost the eye due to boxing several years prior and had a glass eye that he popped out after the kick to give the impression that Velázquez caused him to lose an eye. Some lucha magazines tried to claim that it was Gómez "good eye" that had been injured in the match, trying to keep the illusion that it was a legitimate injury, but the fact that Gómez would continue to wrestle for years underscored the fact that this was indeed a storyline. The storyline had its desired effect, portraying El Murciélago Enmascarado as a heartless villain or rudo. In 1939, Velázquez participated in a tournament for the vacant Mexican National Middleweight Championship where he defeated the likes of Jack O'Brien and Ciclón Veloz but lost to eventual tournament winner Dientes Hernández. During the early parts of his career Velázquez also worked as a policeman, both to make money but also to gain access to the Casino de la Policia training facilities to further his physical abilities in the ring.

In 1940, EMLL began a storyline between El Murciélago Enmascarado and Octavio Gaona that would lead to one of the pivotal moments of the early years of lucha libre. In the United States masked wrestlers were common place and there had been matches where a masked wrestler was forced to unmask as far back as 1926 where Jim Londos defeated the Masked Marvel and he was forced to reveal himself to be Ray Steele. The storyline between played out in a way that the brutal rudo Murciélago drew the normally more technical Gaona into a series of brawls, matches that often ended inconclusively. After a particularly violent match Gaona challenged Murciélago to put his mask on the line in a match. With El Murciélago being lighter than Gaona he demanded that Gaona put his hair on the line as well. With the challenge, the Lucha de Apuestas (or "Bet match") was created. In the build up to the high profile match El Murciélago Enmascarado faced and defeated a number of other wrestlers in Luchas de Apuestas matches leaving Merced Gómez, Bobby Bonales, Dientes Hernández and Ciclón Veloz bald as a result as they built to the match with Gaona. On July 14, 1940, Gaona defeated El Murciélago Enmascarado, forcing him to unmask after the match and reveal his birth name, something that became a lucha libre tradition. Since then Apuesta matches have become the highest profile match in Mexico; winning the mask of an opponent is considered a higher achievement than winning a championship match. After being unmasked he modified his ring name to Murciélago Velázquez and continued to be a hated rudo wrestler as his natural charisma was even more obvious without the mask.

In 1942, Velázquez would gain a measure of revenge on Octavio Gaona when he defeated Gaona in the finals of a tournament for the vacant Mexican National Middleweight Championship. In the late 1930s, a young wrestler, Rodolfo Guzmán, began working as El Murciélago II in and around Mexico City, but Velázquez complained to the Mexico City Boxing and Wrestling Commission that the name was too close to his own ring name and that Velázquez had not given permission for the use. The Commission ruled that Velázquez had the rights to the name, forcing Guzmán to choose a different name. Guzmán adopted a new ring character, El Santo, and in subsequent years became one of the most popular wrestlers in Mexico. EMLL paired the two up for a long running feud that saw the masked El Santo defeat Velázquez in a Luchas de Apuestas match in January 1943, leaving Velázquez bald as a result. Two months later, on March 19, 1943, El Santo won the Mexican National Middleweight Championship from Velázquez as well. By the end of the year, other Mexican wrestlers, such as El Santo rose to the top, relegating Murciélago Velázquez to the lower ranks, working shows all over Mexico but not making as many headlines as his heyday from 1937 through 1942. In 1955, he experienced a career resurgence, teaming with Samar Saleem, forming a tag team that quickly gained a reputation for disregarding the rules and engaging in out of control brawls with their opponents. The team received a push from the promoters as they were given victories over Cavernario Galindo and El Verdungo, another team known for their wild wrestling style, as well as "Tough" Tony Borne and Tony Barbetta, El Santo and Pancho Valentino, Los Hermano Shadow ("The Shadow Brothers"; Black Shadow and Blue Panther) and the team of Tarzán López and Enrique Llanes. One particular match, against López and Henry Pilusso, got so out of hand and bloody that the Mexico City wrestling and boxing commissioner Manuel Muñoz decided to ban both Velázquez and Saleem from wrestling in Mexico City for life. The ban ended the team of Velázquez and Saleem as Velázquez left professional wrestling a short time later to become an actor.

While he retired from in-ring competition in 1955, he never truly left lucha libre. Over the years, he trained wrestlers such as Dick Angelo, Fili Espinoza and Humberto Garza. He also worked in several luchador films in his acting career. In the early 1960s he was the Distrito Federal boxing and wrestling commissioner, going from being a hated rule breaker to the highest authority.

== Movie career ==
In 1957, Velázquez had a small, uncredited role in a Mexican movie called Ladron de Cadaveres ("The Body Snatcher"). He made his first credited on screen appearance in La momia Azteca, where he played a villain known as El Murciélago and being billed as "Murciélago" Velázquez, taking his ring name onto the silver screen. Over the next 10 years, Velázquez had roles in a number of different films, including luchador films starring El Santo and Blue Demon. During this time period, he also began writing screenplays and stories, the first being Triunfa la pandilla ("The triumphant gang") that premiered in 1963. Among his other credits were El mundo de los vampiros ("The world of Vampires"), Tlayucan and Santo contra los jinetes del terror ("Santo vs. the Riders of Terror"). The final movie he wrote the story for, La mujer del diablo ("The Devil Woman"), opened in 1974, a year after Velázquez' death.

== Personal life ==
While Velázquez' in-ring character was brutal and bloodthirsty, the man behind the character was the complete opposite, something not revealed publicly until years after his death. His wrestling peers described him as very friendly and well-read. Velázquez stayed active, writing movie scripts and various stories until his death on May 27, 1972. The autopsy revealed that Velázquez died from cirrhosis of the liver which led to a heart attack.

== Championships and accomplishments ==
- Empresa Mexicana de Lucha Libre

- Mexican National Middleweight Championship (1 time)

== Luchas de Apuestas record ==
Winner (wager)	Loser (wager)	Location	Event	Date	Notes
El Murciélago Enmascarado (mask)	Merced Gómez (hair)	Mexico City	EMLL show	June 23, 1940	
El Murciélago Enmascarado (mask)	Bobby Bonales (hair)	Mexico City	EMLL show	June 30, 1940	
El Murciélago Enmascarado (mask)	Dientes Hernández (hair)	Mexico City	EMLL show	July 4, 1940	
El Murciélago Enmascarado (mask)	Ciclón Veloz (hair)	Mexico City	EMLL show	July 11, 1940	
Octavio Gaona (hair)	El Murciélago Enmascarado (mask)	Mexico City	EMLL show	July 18, 1940	
El Santo (mask)	Murciélago Velázquez (hair)	Mexico City	EMLL show	January 1943	

== Filmography ==
Actor

Year	Original title	English title	Role	Notes	Refs.
1957	Ladron de Cadaveres	The Body Snatcher	Uncredited		
1957	La momia azteca	The Aztec Mummy	El Murciélago	Credited as Murcielago Velazquez	
1957	La maldición de la momia azteca	The Curse of the Aztec Mummy	El Murciélago	credited as Murcielago Velázquez	
1957	Furias desatadas	Fury Unleased		Credited as Jesús Velázquez	
1958	La momia azteca contra el robot humano	The Robot vs. The Aztec Mummy	El Murciélago	Credited as Murcielago Velázquez	
1959	El hombre del alazán	The sorrel man			
1960	Los Tigres del Ring	Tigers of the Ring		Credited as Jesús Velázquez	
1960	Ladrón que roba a ladrón	To rob a thief	Uncredited		
1960	El torneo de la muerte	The tournament of death		Credited as Jesús Velázquez	
1961	Guantes de oro	Golden Gloves		Credited as Jesús 'Murcielago' Velázquez	
1962	Camino de la horca	Road to the gallows	Uncredited		
1963	El señor Tormenta	Mr. Storm		Credited as Murcielago Velazquez	
1963	Las luchadoras contra el médico asesino	Doctor of Doom	Marcado	Credited as 'Murcielago' Velazquez	
1964	Las Luchadoras contract la momia	Wrestling Women vs. the Aztec Mummy	Mao	Credited as Murcielago Velasquez	
1966	Duelo de pistoleros	Duel of the gunmen	Toribio		
1967	La isla de los dinosaurios	The island of the dinosaurs	Caveman		
1968	La Sombra del murcielago	The Shadow of the Bat	Entrenador del murcielago	Credited as Murcielago Velazquez	
1968	Blue Demon contra cerebros infernales	Blue Demon vs the internal brains		Credited as Jesus Velazquez 'El Murcielago'	

Writer

Year	Original title	English title	Wrote	Notes	Refs.
1959	Triunfa la pandilla	The triumphant gang	Screenplay		
1959	La pandilla se divierte	The gang has fun	Screenplay		
1959	La pandilla en acción	The gang in action	Screenplay		
1959	Aventuras de la pandilla	Adventures of the gang	Screenplay		
1960	Venganza fatal	Fatal Vengeance	Story	Credited as Jesus Murcielago Velazquez	
1961	El duende y yo	The Goblin and I	Story		
1961	El mundo de los vampiros	The world of vampires	Story		
1962	Tlayucan	Tlayucan	Story		
1963	El señor Tormenta	Mr. Storm	Story	Credited as Jesús Murcielago Velazquez	
1963	Tesoro de mentiras	Tresury lies	Story		
1964	Yo, el valiente	I, the brave	Adaptation		
1965	Los Tales por cuales	The tales by which	Story	Credited as Jesus Velazquez	
1965	El pozo	The Well	Story		
1965	Las lobas del ring	The wolves of the ring	Scenario / Adaptation		
1965	Audaz y bravero	Bold and brave	Adaptation		
1966	Esta noche no	Not tonight	Adaptation		
1967	Mi caballo prieto rebelde	My black horse rebel	Story / Adaptation	Credited as Jesus Murcielago Velazquez	
1967	Los hombres de Lupe Alvírez	The men of Lupe Alvirez		Credited as Jesus Murcielago Velazquez	
1967	El centauro Pancho Villa	Pancho Villa the Centaur	Story /Screenplay	Credited as Jesús Murcielago Velázquez	
1968	La Sombra del murcielago	The Shadow of the Bat	Screenplay	Credited as Jesus Murcielago Velazquez	
1969	El Yaqui	The Yaqui	Writer		
1969	La maestra inolvidable	The Unforgettable master	Writer		
1970	Santo contra los jinetes del terror	Santo vs. the Riders of Terror	Screenplay / Story	Credited as Jesus Velazquez Quintero	
1974	La mujer del diablo	Devil Woman	Story		
