= The Body Snatcher (1957 film) =

1957 Mexican horror film

- Theatrical release poster
- Directed by: Fernando Mendez
- Screenplay by: Fernando Méndez; Alejandro Verbitzky
- Produced by: Sergio Kogan
- Starring: Columba Domínguez; Crox Alvarado; Wolf Ruvinskis; Carlos Riquelme; Eduardo Alcaraz; Arturo Martínez; Guillermo Hernández; Yerye Beirute; Alberto Catalá; Alejandro Cruz
- Cinematography: Víctor Herrera
- Edited by: Jorge Bustos
- Music by: Federico Ruiz
- Production company: Internacional Cinematográfica
- Distributed by: Columbia Pictures
- Release date: 26 September 1957 (Mexico)
- Running time: 80 minutes
- Country: Mexico
- Language: Spanish

The Body Snatcher (Spanish: Ladrón de Cadáveres, lit. 'Corpse Thief'), is a 1957 Mexican horror film directed by Fernando Mendez who also co-wrote the film with Alejandro Verbitzky.

== Plot ==
In Mexico, Police Captain Carlos Robles (Crox Alvarado) has no leads to solving a series of grisly murders of several of Mexico's top athletes. Unknown to the Comandante, scientist Don Panchito is responsible for the murders and has been murdering the athletic community in order to provide test subjects for his experiments; Panchito's procedure involves removing the victim's brain and replacing it with that of an animal's in an effort to find a way to conquer death.

Desperate to solve the murders, Robles enlists the help of wrestler Guillermo Santana (Wolf Ruvinskis) who acts as bait in order to catch the murderer. However, the trap goes awry and Santana is captured and murdered by Panchito who then removes his brain and replaces it with the brain of a gorilla. Unlike many of Panchito's other victims, Santana survives the procedure but as a result is transformed into a grotesque and bestial state that seems to have taken on several characteristics of that of an ape. Covering his now horrifying vestige with a mask, Panchito sends Santana into the wrestling ring. However, during the fight Santana's animal side takes over and overrides Panchito's programming, ripping off his mask and exposing his hideously deformed face. Santana finds Panchito and slaughters him and then kidnaps Lucía, the woman he loved while he was human and flees on the rooftops with the police in pursuit, setting Lucía down, Santana moves to attack the police but is gunned down by Robles and falls the rooftop to his death.

== Cast ==
- Columba Domínguez as Lucía
- Crox Alvarado as Capt. Carlos Robles
- Wolf Ruvinskis as Guillermo Santana / El Vampiro
- Carlos Riquelme as Don Panchito / The Mad Doctor
- Eduardo Alcaraz as Police Chief
- Arturo Martínez as Felipe Dorantes
- Guillermo Hernández as El Lobo
- Yerye Beirute as Cosme Ramírez
- Alberto Catalá as Rubio, Felipe's assistant
- Alejandro Cruz as El Tigre

== Production ==
=== Development ===
The story for Ladrón de Cadáveres was partially inspired by Universal's Frankenstein which was a commercial and critical success. Hoping to replicate this success, Mexican directors responded by releasing their own variations of Universal Studios famous monster movies, but differed enough to avoid any copyright lawsuits.

== Release ==
The film was released in Mexico on September 26, 1957 and was later released in other countries several years later in Japan in 1958, and in West Germany and Austria in 1958 and 1959 respectively. The film later released on DVD by Ground Zero on July 12, 2005.

== Reception ==
On his website Fantastic Movie Musings and Ramblings, Dave Sindelar gave the film a positive review, calling it "one of the best of the Mexican horror movies".

=== Legacy ===
Before the film's release in 1956, Mexican cinema was experiencing a decline, and most critics dismissed the cinematic films of Mexico. Upon the release of two films directed by Fernando Mendez, the first being Ladrón de cadáveres and El vampiro in 1957. Both films were successful critically and financially and helped bring in the golden age of horror and fantasy films in Mexican cinema.
