= Crox Alvarado =

Mexican actor

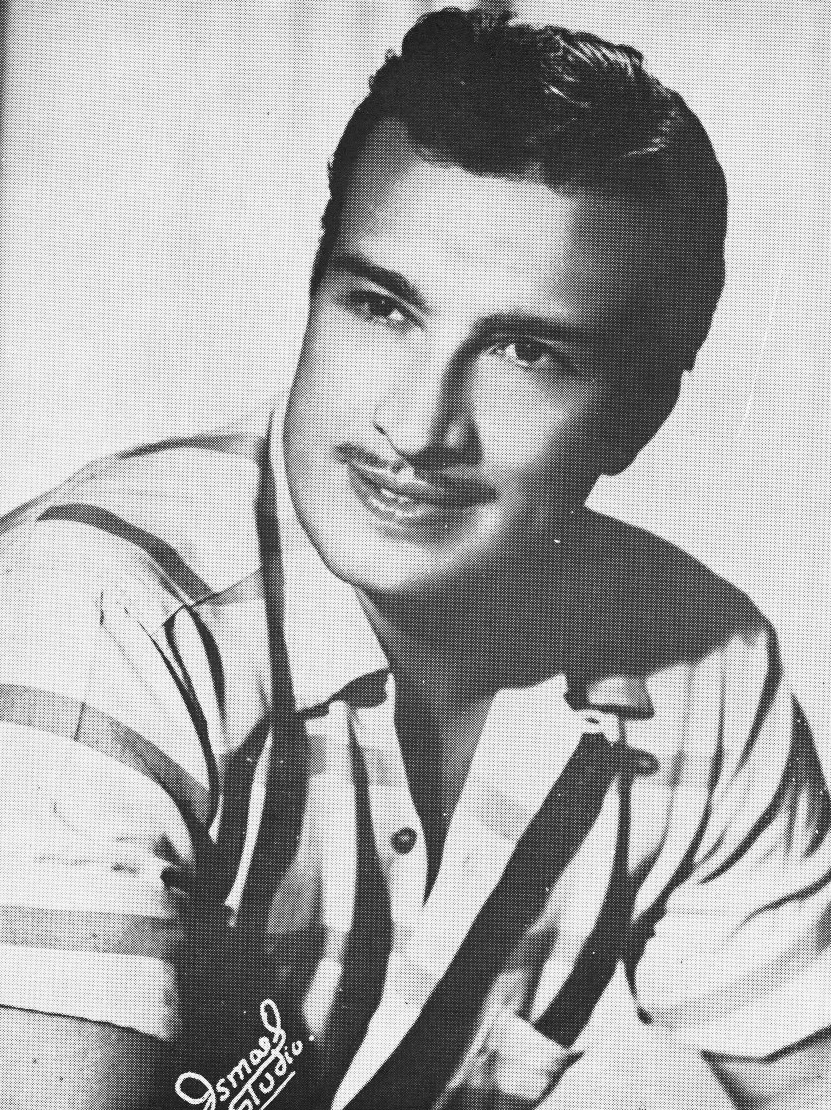
- Alvarado in 1954
- Born: Cruz Pío Socorro Alvarado Bolaños; 3 May 1910; San José, Costa Rica
- Died: 30 January 1984 (aged 73); Mexico City, Mexico
- Occupation: Actor
- Years active: 1937–1983
- Spouse: Amanda del Llano

Cruz Pío Socorro Alvarado Bolado (3 May 1910 – 30 January 1984), known professionally as Crox Alvarado, was a Costa Rican actor who appeared in over 90 films. He was considered a popular star of the Golden Age of Mexican cinema.

Alvarado had been a professional wrestler before being an actor. He was also a caricaturist.

== Selected filmography ==
- Bajo el cielo de México (1937)
- Song of the Soul (1938) - Oficial
- Men of the Sea (1938) - Rigobertito (uncredited)
- Every Madman to His Specialty (1939) - Secretario de notario (uncredited)
- The Cemetery of the Eagles (1939) - Capt. Alemán
- Horse for Horse (1939) - Empleado hotel (uncredited)
- El hotel de los chiflados (1939)
- Papacito lindo (1939) - Galán de cine
- Una luz en mi camino (1939)
- The Midnight Ghost (1940)
- Borrasca humana (1940)
- El barbero prodigioso (1942) - Octavio, amante de Fanny
- Jesús de Nazareth (1942) - Simón Cirineo (uncredited)
- Águila roja (1942) - Gilberto
- Iolanda (1943)
- Land of Passions (1943) - Hijo de Leandro
- El misterioso señor Marquina (1943) - (uncredited)
- Saint Francis of Assisi (1944) - Honorio
- Nana (1944) - Fontan
- Las calaveras del terror (1944)
- Rosa de las nieves (1944)
- Tuya en cuerpo y alma (1945) - Hugo
- Recuerdos de mi valle (1946)
- Pasiones tormentosas (1946) - José
- Yo maté a Rosita Alvírez (1947) - Marcos (uncredited)
- La malagueña (1947) - Rogelio Garmendia
- Si Adelita se fuera con otro (1948) - Mayor Federico Enríquez
- Cortesã (1948)
- Spurs of Gold (1948) - Martín Vázquez
- La Mancornadora (1949) - Julio
- The Devil Is a Woman (1950) - Esteban
- El Desalmado (1950) - Mayor Rosales, Comandante de policía
- In the Flesh (1951) - Fernando Herrera
- Toast to Love (1951) - Cadet
- The Magnificent Beast (1952) - David González
- Ambiciosa (1953) - Óscar Ramírez
- Rossana (1953) - Antonio
- Reportaje (1953) - Young doctor
- El enmascarado de plata (1954) - Julio
- Al son del charlestón (1954)
- Estoy taan enamorada (1954)
- El jinete sin cabeza (1957) - Don Álvaro
- Ladrón de Cadáveres (1957) - Capitán Carlos Robles
- The Aztec Mummy (1957) - Pinacate
- The Curse of the Aztec Mummy (1957) - Pinacate / El Ángel
- La marca de Satanás (1957)
- Secuestro diabolico (1957)
- Furias desatadas (1957)
- El caudillo (1957) - Panfilo Pardo
- The Robot vs. The Aztec Mummy (1958) - Pinacate
- El jinete negro (1958) - Hilarión Mercado
- The Tigers of the Ring (1960) - Mario / Emilio el Torbellino
- The Miracle Roses (1960) - Emperador Moctezuma
- Herencia trágica (1960) - Hilarión Mercado
- Bala de Plata en el pueblo maldito (1960) - Don Manuel
- La ley de las pistolas (1960) - El Yaqui Ramírez
- El torneo de la muerte (1960)
- El tiro de gracia (1961) - Panfilo Pardo
- Duelo indio (1961) - Panfilo Pardo
- El Bronco Reynosa (1961)
- El hijo del charro negro (1961) - Ciriaco
- Cazadores de cabezas (1962) - El Malayo
- Horizontes de sangre (1962)
- El Asaltacaminos (1962) - Hilarión Mercado
- La muerte en el desfiladero (1963)
- Los chacales (1963)
- Sitiados por la muerte (1963)
- La sombra blanca (1963)
- Face of the Screaming Werewolf (1964) - Redding's Bespectacled Aide
- Diablos en el cielo (1965)
- El rifle implacable (1965)
- La loba (1965) - Crumba
- El tigre de Guanajuato: Leyenda de venganza (1965)
- Juan Colorado (1966) - Amigo de Juan
- Juan Pistolas (1966)
- Los hermanos Centella (1967)
- El forastero vengador (1967)
- La isla de los dinosaurios (1967) - Caveman
- Los alegres Aguilares (1967) - Fermín
- El camino de los espantos (1967) - Zopilote
- Atacan las brujas (1968) - Lawyer / henchman
- La mujer murcielago (1968) - Inspector
- Duelo en El Dorado (1969) - Vereda - esbirro de Poveda
- Santo contra Capulina (1969) - Chief of Police
- Una rosa sobre el ring (1973) - Rodrigo Martinez, El Enmascarado Negro
- El tigre de Santa Julia (1974) - Cruz
- La corona de un campeon (1974)
- Alas doradas (1976)
- La sotana del reo (1979) - Comisario
- Chicoasén (1980)
- El sargento Capulina (1983)
