= The Curse of the Aztec Mummy =

- Mexican theatrical release poster
- Directed by: Rafael Portillo
- Written by: Guillermo Calderón; Alfredo Salazar
- Produced by: Guillermo Calderón
- Starring: Ramón Gay; Rosa Arenas; Crox Alvarado; Luis Aceves Castañeda; Jorge Mondraġon; Arturo Martínez; Emma Roldán; Ángel di Stefani
- Cinematography: Enrique Wallace
- Edited by: Jorge Bustos; José Li-ho
- Music by: Antonio Díaz Conde
- Production company: Cinematográfica Calderón S.A.
- Distributed by: Clasa-Mohme (United States)
- Release date: 1957
- Running time: 65 minutes
- Country: Mexico
- Language: Spanish

The Curse of the Aztec Mummy (Spanish: La Maldición de la Momia Azteca) is a 1957 Mexican horror film directed by Rafael Portillo. It is the second film in the Aztec Mummy series which began with The Aztec Mummy (Spanish title: La Momia Azteca) which was released earlier that year.

== Plot ==
The evil Dr. Krupp known as The Bat escapes from the police with the aid of his gang. He once again tries to get possession of the Aztec princess Xochitl's gold breastplate and bracelet by hypnotizing her current reincarnation Flor Sepúlveda to get her to reveal the location of Xochitl's tomb.

Confusion reigns as Dr. Krupp and his thugs are opposed by Flor's fiancé Dr. Eduardo Almada, his mild-mannered assistant Pinacate and a mysterious masked superhero called the Angel. Dr. Krupp kidnaps Flor, Almada and the Angel and tries to force Almada to translate the hieroglyphics on the breastplate, which will reveal the secret location of the Aztec treasure. It turns out their bookish friend Pinacate has been the man behind the Angel's mask.

However, Krupp finally meets his match when Popoca, the warrior mummy who guards Xochitl's tomb, bursts into Dr. Krupp's lab, kills his thugs and throws the screaming Dr. Krupp into a pit filled with live snakes. Popoca takes his stolen artifacts and stumbles off back to his tomb.

== Cast ==
- Ramón Gay as Dr. Eduardo Almada
- Rosa Arenas as Flor Sepúlveda / Xochitl
- Crox Alvarado as Pinacate / El Ángel
- Luis Aceves Castañeda as Dr. Krupp / El Murciélago
- Jorge Mondragón as Dr. Sepúlveda
- Arturo Martínez as Tierno
- Emma Roldán as María
- Julián de Meriche as the Commandante de Policía
- Jaime González Quiñones as Pepe Almada
- Ángel di Stefani as Popoca
- Jesús Murcielago Velázquez as El Murciélago
- Enrique Yáñez as Esbirro del Murciélago
- Guillermo Hernández as Esbirro del Murciélago
- Alberto Yáñez as Esbirro del Murciélago
- Firpo Segura as Esbirro del Murciélago
- Sergio Yañez as Esbirro del Murciélago
- Estela Inda as Aztec Chanteuse

== Release ==
The Curse of the Aztec Mummy was released theatrically in 1957. It was later dubbed in English and released in the U.S. by K. Gordon Murray.

== Reception ==
Author and film critic Leonard Maltin awarded the film one and a half out of four stars, calling it "Cheap" and "droning". On his website Fantastic Movie Musings and Ramblings, Dave Sindelar noted that the film was slightly better than its sequel The Robot vs. The Aztec Mummy, having more plot than the other films in the series. Sindelar's only criticism was slow pacing during the last half of the film. TV Guide awarded the film three out of four stars, calling it "wholly enjoyable". Horror DVDs.com on their review for the complete series gave the film a negative review calling it "the least satisfying entry in the series". The reviewer also criticized the introduction of the superhero El Ángel (Crox Alvarado) as "random".

== Related films ==
- The Aztec Mummy (1957), released as Attack of the Mayan Mummy in the U.S.
- The Robot vs. the Aztec Mummy (1957)
- The Wrestling Women vs. the Aztec Mummy (1964), featured a similar Aztec mummy named Tezomoc
- Mil Mascaras vs. the Aztec Mummy (2007)
