= El juramento (1974 TV series) =

- Genre: Telenovela
- Directed by: Guillermo Diazayas
- Starring: Marga López; Jorge Martínez de Hoyos
- Country of origin: Mexico
- Original language: Spanish

Original release
- Network: Canal de las Estrellas
- Release: 1974

El juramento, is a Mexican telenovela directed by Guillermo Diazayas for Televisa in 1974. Starring Marga López and Jorge Martínez de Hoyos.

== Cast ==
- Marga López
- Jorge Martínez de Hoyos
- Carmen Salas
- Nubia Martí
- Enrique Novi
- Aarón Hernán
- Socorro Avelar
- Miguel Gómez Checa
- Juan Peláez
