= Libia =

Libia may refer to:

- Libya, the country, as a misspelling or in Italian and other languages
  - Particularly during the Italian period
- Libia (Rome Metro), underground station
- Italian cruiser Libia, named for the Italian colony

== People ==
- Ana Libia, Mexican singer
- Libia Castro, an artist
- Libia Franca, Italian film actress
- Libia García Muñoz Ledo, Mexican lawyer, writer and politician
- Libia Grueso, Colombian social worker and civil rights activist
- Libia Lobo Sardesai, Indian independence activist and lawyer
