= Love in Every Port (1949 film) =

1949 film

- Directed by: Ernesto Cortázar
- Written by: Ernesto Cortázar; Pedro Galindo; Ramón Pérez Peláez; Ignacio Villareal
- Produced by: Jesús Galindo
- Starring: Blanca Estela Pavón; Domingo Soler; Amalia Aguilar
- Cinematography: Víctor Herrera
- Edited by: Jorge Bustos
- Music by: Gonzalo Curiel
- Production company: Filmadora Chapultepec
- Release date: 2 January 1949
- Running time: 100 minutes
- Country: Mexico
- Language: Spanish

Love in Every Port (Spanish: En cada puerto un amor) is a 1949 Mexican musical drama film directed by Ernesto Cortázar and starring Blanca Estela Pavón, Domingo Soler and Amalia Aguilar. It was shot at the Churubusco Studios in Mexico City. The film's sets were designed by the art director Ramón Rodríguez Granada. It was made as a Rumberas film, a popular genre during the Golden Age of Mexican Cinema.

== Cast ==
- Blanca Estela Pavón as Blanca
- Domingo Soler as Juan el capitán
- Pedro Galindo as Mario
- Amalia Aguilar as Olga
- Miguel Inclán as Matón
- Charles Rooner as Mafioso
- Arturo Martínez as Esteban
- Alfredo Gil as Self
- Chucho Navarro as Self
- Hernando Avilés as Self
- Juan Bruno Tarraza as Self
- Benny Moré as Self

== Bibliography ==
- Riera, Emilio García. Historia documental del cine mexicano: 1946-1948. Universidad de Guadalajara, 1992.
- Wilt, David E. The Mexican Filmography, 1916 through 2001. McFarland, 2024.
