= Irlanda Mora =

Colombian actress

- Born: 9 February 1939; Ibagué, Colombia
- Died: 18 November 2010 (aged 71); Mexico City, Mexico
- Years active: 1952-2005

Irlanda Mora (9 February 1939 – 18 November 2010) was a Colombian actress who was born in Ibagué. She was best known for acting in Un sueño de amor (A Dream of Love), Los caciques (The Caciques) and La montaña del diablo (The Devil's Mountain).

== Career ==
Irlanda debuted in the 1952 film Aquellos ojos verdes (Those green eyes) as a younger version of the main character, Silvia Falcón. She continued to act in films until the 1990s, but also started acting in Mexican soap operas such as María la del Barrio and as Aunt Paz in María Mercedes. After retiring from television and film in 2005, she died in November 2010.

== Filmography ==
=== Movies ===
Year	Title	Role	Director(s)
1952	Aquellos ojos verdes	Silvia Falcón, young	Zacarías Gómez Urquiza
1953	Frutos de tentación	College Student	Alfredo B. Crevenna
1953	Mujeres que trabajan	Girl in boardinghouse	Julio Bracho
1953	La extraña pasajera	Beata's daughter	Fernando A. Rivero
1953	Mi adorada Clementina	Guest at party	Rafael Baledón
1953	El jugador	Licha's friend	Vicente Oroná
1953	Eugenia Grandet	Carlos's fiancée	Emilio Gómez Muriel
1963	Vagabundo en la lluvia	Laura	Carlos Enrique Taboada
1969	Modisto de señoras	Irlanda	René Cardona Jr.
1969	Las impuras	Unnamed	Alfredo B. Crevenna
1969	Mujeres de medianoche	Elsa	Alfonso Corona Blake
1969	El criado malcriado	Lulis	Francisco de Villar
1970	El despertar del lobo	Sofia	René Cardona Jr.
1970	El amor de María Isabel	Bettina	Federico Curiel
1970	Click, fotógrafo de modelos	Woman in nudist camp	René Cardona Jr.
1970	Fray don Juan	Bank teller	René Cardona Jr.
1970	La mujer de oro	Unnamed	René Cardona Jr.
1971	Los novios	Elvira	Gilberto Gazcón
1971	Bang bang al hoyo	Unnamed	René Cardona Jr.
1972	Un sueño de amor	Karis' mom	Rubén Galindo
1974	La amargura de mi raza	Unnamed	Rubén Galindo
1974	El carita	Unnamed	Gilberto Martínez Solares
1974	Capulina contra los monstruos	Unnamed	Miguel Morayta
1974	Pistolero del diablo	Nolan's girlfriend	Rubén Galindo
1975	Laberinto de pasiones	Sara	Miguel Morayta
1975	Las caciques	Death	Juan Andrés Bueno
1975	Un amor extraño	Guest	Tito Davison
1975	La montaña del diablo	Death	Juan Andrés Bueno Javier Durán
1977	Las cenizas del diputado	Mrs. Arreboles	Roberto Gavaldón
1978	Duro pero seguro	Helen Goldsmith	Fernando Cortés
1979	La muerte tambien cabalga	Unnamed	Otto Coronado
1979	El amor de mi vida	Helen Goldsmith	Joselito Rodríguez
1988	Alicia en el pais del dolar	Unnamed	Benito Alazraki
1988	El vergonzoso	Unnamed	Miguel M. Delgado
1990	A gozar, a gozar, que el mundo se va acabar	Unnamed	Miguel M. Delgado

=== Television ===
Year(s)	Title	Role
1978	Un original y veinte copias	Teresita
1980	Cancionera	Tania
1986	Cicatrices del alma	Monserrat
1986	Ave Fénix	Leticia
1988	Flor y canela	Trudi
1989	Mi segunda madre	Angélica
1989	Simplemente María	Caridad
1990	Cenizas y diamantes	Emma
1991	La pícara soñadora	Leonor de Carini
1992-93	María Mercedes	Paz
1996	María la del barrio	La Leona
1997	Los hijos de nadie	Unnamed
1997	Amada enemiga	Fernanda
2000-05	Mujer, casos de la vida real	Unnamed
