= After the Storm (1955 film) =

1955 film directed by Roberto Gavaldón

- Directed by: Roberto Gavaldón
- Written by: Julio Alejandro; Roberto Gavaldón
- Produced by: Emilio Tuero
- Starring: Marga López; Lilia Prado; Ramón Gay
- Cinematography: Raúl Martínez Solares
- Edited by: Carlos Savage
- Music by: Gonzalo Curiel
- Production companies: Filmadora Argel; Pydasa
- Distributed by: Azteca Films
- Release date: 26 August 1955
- Running time: 95 minutes
- Country: Mexico
- Language: Spanish

After the Storm (Spanish: Después de la tormenta) is a 1955 Mexican drama film directed by Roberto Gavaldón and starring Marga López, Lilia Prado and Ramón Gay. It was shot at the Tepeyac Studios in Mexico City. The film's sets were designed by the art director Edward Fitzgerald. Location shooting took place around the Isla de Lobos and San Juan de Ulúa in Veracruz. It premiered at the 1955 Venice Film Festival in Italy.

== Cast ==
- Marga López as Rosa Rivero de Montes
- Lilia Prado as María
- Ramón Gay as Melchor / Rafael
- José Luis Jiménez as José
- Prudencia Grifell as Madre superiora
- Pepe Romay as Rafaelito
- Augusto Benedico as Investigador policía
- Salvador Godínez as Pescador
- Salvador Terroba as Pescador
- Óscar Jaimes as Pescador
- Ignacio Solorzano as Pescador
- Jose Salas as Pescador

== Bibliography ==
- Amador, María Luisa. Cartelera cinematográfica, 1950-1959. UNAM, 1985.
- Gracia, Fernando Mino. La fatalidad urbana: el cine de Roberto Gavaldón. Universidad Nacional Autónoma de México, 2007.
- Sánchez, Francisco. Crónica antisolemne del cine mexicano. Universidad Veracruzana, 1989.
