= Maria Islands =

1951 film

María Islands
- Directed by: Emilio Fernández
- Written by: Emilio Fernández; Mauricio Magdaleno
- Produced by: Ismael Rodríguez
- Starring: Pedro Infante; Rosaura Revueltas; Rocío Sagaón
- Cinematography: Gabriel Figueroa
- Edited by: Gloria Schoemann
- Music by: Antonio Díaz Conde
- Production company: Películas Rodríguez
- Distributed by: Clasa-Mohme
- Release date: 10 August 1951
- Running time: 84 minutes
- Country: Mexico
- Language: Spanish

María Islands (Spanish: Las Islas Marías) is a 1951 Mexican drama film directed by Emilio Fernández and starring Pedro Infante, Rosaura Revueltas, and Rocío Sagaón. It was made at the Churubusco Studios in Mexico City. The film's sets were designed by the art director Manuel Fontanals. Location shooting took place on the Islas Marías from which the films takes its name.

== Cast ==
- Pedro Infante as Felipe Ortiz Suárez
- Rosaura Revueltas as Rosa Suárez vda. de Ortiz
- Rocío Sagaón as María
- Esther Luquín as Alejandra
- Jaime Fernández as Ricardo
- Arturo Soto Rangel as Miguel
- Julio Villarreal as Rector escuela militar
- Rodolfo Acosta as El Silencio
- Tito Junco as General
- Luis Aceves Castañeda as Detective de policía
- Julio Ahuet as Taxista
- Daniel Arroyo as Invitado a fiesta
- Josefina Burgos as Florista
- Margarita Ceballos as Margarita
- Aurora Cortés as Sirvienta
- José Escanero as Vecino
- Rogelio Fernández as Alguacil
- Georgina González as Espectadora marcha militar
- Gilberto González
- Emilio Gálvez
- Leonor Gómez as Cocinera Islas Marias
- Elodia Hernández as Parienta de prisionero
- Regino Herrera as Preso
- Felipe Montoya as Lic. González
- Yolanda Ortiz as Cabaretera
- Ignacio Peón as Actuario
- Salvador Quiroz as Coronel
- Humberto Rodríguez as Actuario
- Jorge Treviño as Don Jorge
- Hernán Vera as Don Venancio
- Manuel Vergara 'Manver' as Borracho cabaret

== Bibliography ==
- Berumen, Frank Javier Garcia. Brown Celluloid: 1894-1959. Vantage Press, 2003.
- Gilabert, Rosa Peralt. Manuel Fontanals, escenógrafo: teatro, cine y exilio. Editorial Fundamentos, 2007.
- Heredia, Juanita. Transnational Latina Narratives in the Twenty-first Century. Palgrave Macmillan, 2009.
