= Alicia Caro =

Colombian-Mexican actress (1930–2026)

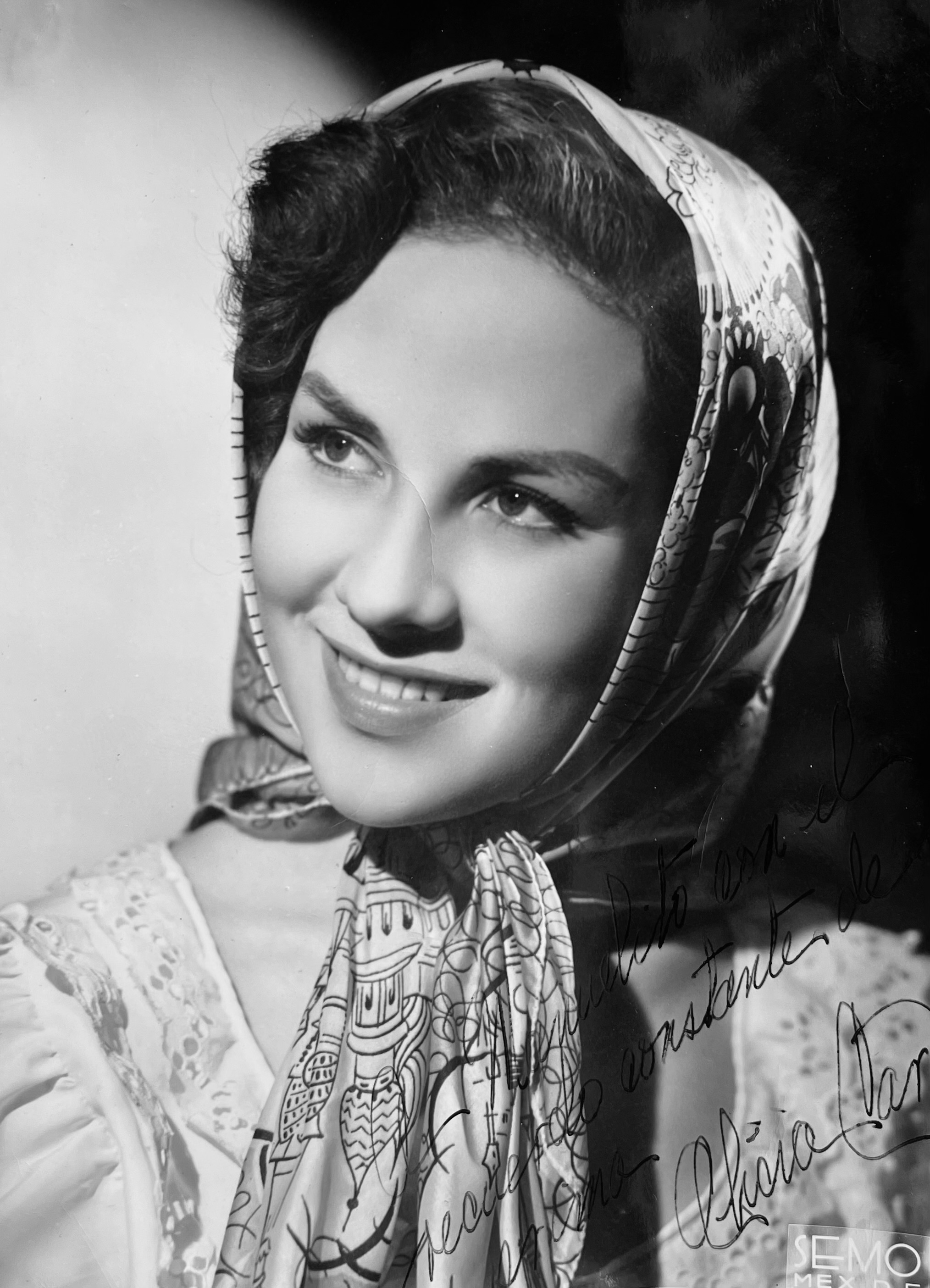
- Caro in 1952
- Born: 8 July 1930; Bogotá, Colombia
- Died: 17 March 2026 (aged 95); Mexico City, Mexico
- Citizenship: Colombian; Mexican
- Occupation: Actress
- Years active: 1947–1994
- Spouse(s): Fernando Arbeláez (m. 1956; div. 1956) Jorge Martínez de Hoyos (m. 1965; died 1997)

Beatriz Segura Peñuela known professionally as Alicia Caro (8 July 1930 – 17 March 2026) was a Colombian-Mexican actress. Relocating to Mexico as a child in 1939, she made her screen debut in the 1947 film Soledad debuting during the Golden Age of Mexican cinema under a stage name inspired by the novel The Vortex and Colombian politician Miguel Antonio Caro. Throughout her life, she was married to poet Fernando Arbeláez and actor Jorge Martínez de Hoyos, before dying in Coyoacán, Mexico, at the age of 95.

== Early life ==
Born Beatriz Segura Peñuela on July 8, 1930, in Bogotá, Colombia. Caro spent her early educational years at the Colegio de la Presentación in Duitama. In 1939, following her mother's marital difficulties, they relocated to Mexico.

She was the daughter of Gertrudis Peñuela Eslava, who was a writer, journalist, and diplomat known by the pseudonym Laura Victoria. Caro's film career began when Libertad Lamarque recommended her to director Miguel Zacarías, leading to her screen debut in the 1947 film Soledad. Zacarías was concurrently casting for his film La vorágine: Abismos de amor (based on the novel The Vortex), which inspired her pseudonym. She adopted the name "Alicia" from one of the novel's characters, while the surname "Caro" was chosen to honor the Colombian writer and politician Miguel Antonio Caro.

== Personal life ==
In 1956, she married the poet Fernando Arbeláez and relocated to Sweden, where he had been appointed First Secretary of the Colombian embassy. However, the couple separated in less than a year. Caro subsequently returned to Mexico to resume her career. In 1965, she married for a second time to Jorge Martínez de Hoyos and had Gabriel García Márquez serve as the best man. This marriage ended when Hoyos died shortly after starring in Oedipus Mayor. After her mother died in 2004, Caro was relocated to Coyoacán.

== Death ==
Caro died on 17 March 2026 in Coyoacan.

== Selected filmography ==
- Dos pesos dejada (1949)
- Red Rain (1950)
- Girls in Uniform (1951)
- My Wife Is Not Mine (1951)
- Daughter of Deceit (1951)
- Snow White (1952)
- Chucho the Mended (1952)
- The White Rose (1954)
- The Three Elenas (1954)

== Bibliography ==
- Charles Ramírez Berg. The Classical Mexican Cinema: The Poetics of the Exceptional Golden Age Films. University of Texas Press, 2015.
