= Juan Charrasqueado =

1948 film

- Directed by: Ernesto Cortázar
- Written by: Ignacio Villareal; Ramón Pérez Peláez; Ernesto Cortázar
- Produced by: Pedro Galindo
- Starring: Pedro Armendáriz; Miroslava; Fernando Soto
- Cinematography: Víctor Herrera
- Edited by: Juan José Marino
- Music by: Gonzalo Curiel
- Production company: Filmadora Chapultepec
- Distributed by: Filmadora Chapultepec
- Release date: February 5, 1948
- Running time: 98 minutes
- Country: Mexico
- Language: Spanish

Juan Charrasqueado is a 1948 Mexican Western film directed by Ernesto Cortázar and starring Pedro Armendáriz, Miroslava, and Fernando Soto "Mantequilla". The film's sets were designed by the art director Francisco Marco Chillet.

== Cast ==
- Pedro Armendáriz as Juan Robledo / Juan Charrasqueado
- Miroslava as María
- Fernando Soto "Mantequilla" as El Trece
- Arturo Martínez as Luis Coronado
- Luis Aceves Castañeda as El Sota
- Fernando Casanova as Felipe
- Ángel Merino as Fernando
- Carlos Múzquiz as El Malilla
- Georgina Barragán as Charrita
- Silvia Rey
- Conchita Carracedo
- Fernando Curiel as Empleado de Luis
- Amada Dosamantes as Chica pueblerina
- Jaime Fernández as Espectador pelea gallos
- Emilio Garibay as Empleado
- Margarito Luna as Hombre en cantina
- Paco Martínez as Doctor
- Estela Matute as Zarca
- Francisco Pando as Don Pepe, cantinero
- Víctor Parra
- Luis Pérez Meza
- Matilde Sánchez as Cantante
- Ignacio Villalbazo as Hombre en cantina
- Ana María Villaseñor as Chica en cantina

== Bibliography ==
- Agrasánchez, Rogelio. Mexican Movies in the United States: A History of the Films, Theaters, and Audiences, 1920–1960. McFarland & Company, 2006.
