= Philip of Jesus (film) =

1949 film

- Directed by: Julio Bracho
- Written by: Julio Bracho; Salvador Elizondo; Rafael M. Saavedra; Xavier Villaurrutia
- Produced by: Salvador Elizondo; Fernando Marcos
- Starring: Ernesto Alonso; Rita Macedo; Julio Villarreal
- Cinematography: Raúl Martínez Solares
- Edited by: Jorge Busto
- Music by: Raúl Lavista
- Production company: Clasa Films Mundiales
- Release date: 5 August 1949
- Running time: 106 minutes
- Country: Mexico
- Language: Spanish

Philip of Jesus (Spanish: Felipe de Jesús) is a 1949 Mexican historical drama film directed by Julio Bracho and starring Ernesto Alonso, Rita Macedo and Julio Villarreal. It portrays the life of the Mexican priest Philip of Jesus who was martyred in Japan in 1597.

== Cast ==
- Ernesto Alonso as Felipe de las Casas
- Rita Macedo as Rosalía / María
- Julio Villarreal as Friar Pedro Bautista
- Rodolfo Acosta as Prince Chokozabe
- José Baviera as Don Alonso
- Francisco Jambrina as Captain Matias de Landecho
- Luis Aceves Castañeda as Emperor Iroyoshi Taikosama
- Ernesto Finance as Don García
- José Morcillo as don Lope, father of Rosalía
- Maruja Grifell as Mother of Felipe
- Dolores Camarillo as Marijuana
- Eugenia Galindo as Teresa, servant of Rosalía
- Daniel Arroyo as Guest at a recital
- Diana Bracho as Rosalía (niña)
- Antonio Bravo as Cristobal de Villahermosa
- Rodolfo Calvo as Admiral Cumberland
- Alejandro Ciangherotti as Dying brother
- Ramón Gay as Soldier
- Conchita Gentil Arcos as Guest at a recital
- María Gentil Arcos as Guest at a recital
- Ismael Larumbe as Friar Carlos
- Héctor Mateos
- Juan Orraca as Soldier
- José Ortega as Passerby in Filipinas
- Juan Pulido as Japanese councilor
- Humberto Rodríguez as Silversmith
- Jesús Valero as Friar Juan

== Reception ==
Robert Villarreal of El Norte praised the film, calling it "beautifully shot". He said the film's costumes and set designs "meticulously craft a specific atmosphere and vividly recreate a bygone era", allowing Bracho to successfully make "one of his most visually exquisite films" as he "infuses it with ironic commentary and a touch of sensuality".

== Bibliography ==
- Rogelio Agrasánchez. Cine Mexicano: Posters from the Golden Age, 1936-1956. Chronicle Books, 2001.
