= My Wife and the Other One =

1952 film

- Directed by: Alfredo B. Crevenna
- Written by: Edmundo Báez; Dino Maiuri
- Produced by: Alfredo Ripstein Jr.
- Starring: Arturo de Córdova; Marga López; Ramón Gay
- Cinematography: Agustín Martínez Solares
- Edited by: Rafael Ceballos
- Music by: Antonio Díaz Conde
- Production company: Royal Films
- Distributed by: Alameda Films
- Release date: 10 April 1952
- Running time: 110 minutes
- Country: Mexico
- Language: Spanish

My Wife and the Other One (Spanish: Mi esposa y la otra) is a 1952 Mexican drama film directed by Alfredo B. Crevenna and starring Arturo de Córdova, Marga López and Ramón Gay. It was shot at the San Ángel Studios in Mexico City. The film's sets were designed by the art director Jorge Fernández. It was nominated for a number of Ariel Awards.

== Cast ==
- Arturo de Córdova as Antonio del Villar
- Marga López as Cristina Martínez
- Ramón Gay as Ricardo
- Alma Delia Fuentes as Martha
- Beatriz Aguirre as Alicia - esposa de Ricardo
- Arturo Soto Rangel as Hermenegildo Martínez - padre de Cristina
- Alfonso Mejía as Pablo
- Angélica María as Carmelita
- Quintín Bulnes as Rosendo
- Lupe Carriles as Sebastiana
- Salvador Quiroz as Gallero
- Cecilia Leger as Delfina Martínez - Mamá de Cristina

== Bibliography ==
- Gennari, Daniela Treveri. The Palgrave Handbook of Comparative New Cinema Histories. Springer Nature, 2023.
- Riera, Emilio García . Historia documental del cine mexicano: 1952. Ediciones Era, 1969.
