= Spurs of Gold =

1948 film

- Directed by: Agustín P. Delgado
- Written by: Ernesto Cortázar; Tito Davison; Agustín P. Delgado; Eduardo Galindo; Jesús Galindo
- Produced by: Jesús Galindo
- Starring: Pedro Galindo; Crox Alvarado; Amanda del Llano
- Cinematography: Víctor Herrera
- Edited by: José Marino
- Music by: Gonzalo Curiel
- Production company: Filmadora Chapultepec
- Release date: 15 May 1948
- Running time: 90 minutes
- Country: Mexico
- Language: Spanish

Spurs of Gold (Spanish:Espuelas de oro) is a 1948 Mexican western film directed by Agustín P. Delgado and starring Pedro Galindo, Crox Alvarado and Amanda del Llano. The film's sets were designed by the art director Francisco Marco Chillet.

== Cast ==
- Pedro Galindo as Armando
- Crox Alvarado as Martín Vázquez
- Amanda del Llano as Rosa María
- Fernando Soto "Mantequilla" as Trompo
- Consuelo Guerrero de Luna as Tía Isabel
- Luis G. Barreiro as Don Niceforo
- Pepe Nava as La cotorra
- Carlos Múzquiz as Coyote
- Julio Ahuet as Fidencio
- José G. Cruz as Anselmo
- Rogelio Fernández as Invitado a fiesta
- Georgina González as Invitada a fiesta
- Margarito Luna as Pueblerino
- Rubén Márquez as Empleado banco
- Ignacio Peón as Pueblerino
- Humberto Rodríguez as Empleado banco

== Bibliography ==
- Riera, Emilio García (1992). Historia documental del cine mexicano: 1946-1948. Universidad de Guadalajara. p. 318. ISBN 9789688954270.
