= My Darling Clementine (1953 film) =

1953 film by Rafael Baledón

- Directed by: Rafael Baledón
- Written by: Ramón Obón; Alejandro Verbitzky; Emilio Villalba Welsh
- Produced by: Alfredo Ripstein hijo
- Starring: Marga López; Joaquín Pardavé; Antonio Aguilar
- Cinematography: Agustín Martínez Solares
- Edited by: Alfredo Rosas Priego
- Music by: Antonio Díaz Conde
- Production company: Cinematográfica Filmex
- Release date: 24 June 1953
- Running time: 80 minutes
- Country: Mexico
- Language: Spanish

My Darling Clementine (Spanish: Mi adorada Clementina) is a 1953 Mexican comedy film directed by Rafael Baledón and starring Marga López, Joaquín Pardavé, Elda Peralda and Antonio Aguilar. The film's sets were designed by the art director Jorge Fernández.

== Cast ==
- Marga López as Clementina
- Joaquín Pardavé as Don Carlos
- Antonio Aguilar as Alfredo
- Elda Peralta as Norma
- Pedro de Aguillón as Doctor R. Obon
- José Jasso "El Ojón" as Gregorio
- Leobardo Acosta
- Norma Ancira
- León Barroso as Detective
- Victorio Blanco as Invitada a fiesta
- Ángel Merino
- Irlanda Mora as Invitada a fiesta
- Isaac Norton as Invitado a fiesta
- José Pidal as Mayordomo
- María Valdealde as Invitada a fiesta

== Bibliography ==
- María Luisa Amador. Cartelera cinematográfica, 1950-1959. UNAM, 1985.
