= The Night Is Ours (1952 film) =

1952 film

- Directed by: Fernando A. Rivero
- Written by: Víctor Mora; Fernando A. Rivero
- Based on: Irresponsables by Pedro Mata
- Produced by: Guillermo Calderón; Pedro A. Calderón
- Starring: Jorge Mistral; Emilia Guiú; Ramón Gay
- Cinematography: Domingo Carrillo
- Edited by: Alfredo Rosas Priego
- Music by: Antonio Díaz Conde
- Production company: Producciones Calderón
- Release date: 27 September 1952
- Running time: 79 minutes
- Country: Mexico
- Language: Spanish

The Night Is Ours (Spanish: La noche es nuestra) is a 1952 Mexican drama film directed by Fernando A. Rivero and starring Jorge Mistral, Emilia Guiú and Ramón Gay. It was shot at the Tepeyac Studios in Mexico City. The film's sets were designed by the art director Manuel Fontanals.

== Cast ==
- Jorge Mistral as Federico Aldama
- Emilia Guiú as Rosario
- Ramón Gay as Antonio
- César del Campo as Pepito Ruiz
- Aurora Walker as Nana Trini
- Jorge Sareli as Alfredo
- Roberto G. Rivera as Jarocho
- Gloria Jordán as Amadita
- José Luis Rojas as Periodista
- Celia Viveros as Palmira
- Lidia Franco as Doña Gloria
- Francisco Ledesma as Jefe redacción
- Pedro Vargas as Cantante
- Toña la Negra as Cantante
- Ana María González as Cantante
- Los Tres Diamantes as Cantantes
- Los Churumbeles de España as Cantantes
- Juan Bruno Tarraza as Pianista
- Fello Vergara as Pianista
- Orquestra Anacaona as Orquesta
- Gloria Mestre as Bailarina

== Bibliography ==
- Amador, María Luisa. Cartelera cinematográfica, 1950-1959. UNAM, 1985.
- Gilabert, Rosa Peralt. Manuel Fontanals, escenógrafo: teatro, cine y exilio. Editorial Fundamentos, 2007.
- Wood, Andrew Grant. Agustin Lara: A Cultural Biography. OUP, 2014.
