= Antonio Díaz Conde =

Mexican composer

- Born: 1914; Mexico
- Died: 31 December 1976 (aged 62)
- Occupation: Composer
- Years active: 1942–1974 (film)

Antonio Díaz Conde (1914–1976) was a Mexican composer. He worked prolifically in the Mexican film industry working on the film scores for over three hundred productions. He worked frequently with the director Emilio Fernández. His scores were used for many of the urban and prostitute melodramas of the 1940s and 1950s.

== Selected filmography ==
- I'm a Real Mexican (1942)
- Pepita Jiménez (1946)
- Madam Temptation (1948)
- Revenge (1948)
- Coqueta (1949)
- Salón México (1949)
- Lost (1950)
- Duel in the Mountains (1950)
- Wife or Lover (1950)
- It's a Sin to Be Poor (1950)
- The Little House (1950)
- Rosauro Castro (1950)
- The Lovers (1951)
- Maria Islands (1951)
- Love Was Her Sin (1951)
- My Wife Is Not Mine (1951)
- From the Can-Can to the Mambo (1951)
- Port of Temptation (1951)
- Stronghold (1951)
- Women of the Theatre (1951)
- Sensuality (1951)
- Forever Yours (1952)
- My Wife and the Other One (1952)
- The Night Is Ours (1952)
- Acapulco (1952)
- I Don't Deny My Past (1952)
- Victims of Divorce (1952)
- Sacrificed Women (1952)
- When the Fog Lifts (1952)
- The Three Perfect Wives (1953)
- Pompey the Conqueror (1953)
- My Darling Clementine (1953)
- My Father Was at Fault (1953)
- The Sword of Granada (1953)
- Reportaje (1953)
- The Second Woman (1953)
- I Am Very Macho (1953)
- I Want to Live (1953)
- The White Rose (1954)
- Untouched (1954)
- The Sin of Being a Woman (1955)
- The Aztec Mummy (1957)
- The Curse of the Aztec Mummy (1957)
- Music and Money (1958)
- Dangers of Youth (1960)
- His First Love (1960)
- Invincible Guns (1960)
- The Miracle Roses (1960)
- Two Cheap Husbands (1960)

== Bibliography ==
- Avila, Jaqueline. Cinesonidos: Film Music and National Identity During Mexico's Época de Oro. Oxford University Press, 2019.
- Reyes, Luis I. Made in Mexico: Hollywood South of the Border. Rowman & Littlefield, 2024.
