= Arturo Martínez (actor) =

- Born: 21 January 1919; San Luis Potosi, Mexico
- Died: 21 August 1992 (aged 73); Mexico City, Mexico
- Other name: Arturo Martínez Chávez
- Occupation: Actor
- Years active: 1948 - 1991 (film)

Arturo Martínez (21 January 1919 – 21 August 1992) was a Mexican film actor and director. He began his career by appearing in Juan Charrasqueado (1948) during the Golden age of Mexican cinema and went on to appear in around a hundred and eighty films during his career. He started directing films in 1961.

== Selected filmography ==
=== Actor ===
- Juan Charrasqueado (1948)
- Laura's Sin (1949)
- Don't Love Me So Much (1949)
- Rough But Respectable (1949)
- Love in Every Port (1949)
- The Woman of the Port (1949)
- My Favourite (1950)
- Red Rain (1950)
- Rosauro Castro (1950)
- Tenement House (1951)
- The Shrew (1951)
- Radio Patrol (1951)
- From the Can-Can to the Mambo (1951)
- The Lone Wolf (1952)
- The Minister's Daughter (1952)
- The Lottery Ticket Seller (1953)
- Northern Border (1953)
- A Tailored Gentleman (1954)
- The Hidden One (1956)
- The Aztec Mummy (1957)
- The Curse of the Aztec Mummy (1957)
- The Black Scorpion (1957)
- The Body Snatcher (1957)
- Raffles (1958)
- The Boxer (1958)
- The Robot vs. the Aztec Mummy (1958)
- Northern Courier (1960)
- Chucho el Roto (1960)

== Bibliography ==
- Wood, Andrew Grant. The Borderlands: An Encyclopedia of Culture and Politics on the U.S.-Mexico Divide. Greenwood Press, 2008.
