= The Miracle Roses =

1960 film

- Directed by: Julián Soler
- Written by: Alfonso Patiño Gómez
- Produced by: Francisco Gómez; Alfonso Patiño Gómez; Enrique Rosas Priego; Eduardo Vega Lavín
- Starring: Armando Silvestre; Crox Alvarado; Jaime Fernández
- Cinematography: Raúl Martínez Solares
- Edited by: Alfredo Rosas Priego
- Music by: Antonio Díaz Conde
- Production company: Productora Fílmica México
- Release date: 7 April 1960
- Running time: 90 minutes
- Country: Mexico
- Language: Spanish

The Miracle Roses (Spanish: Las rosas del milagro) is a 1960 Mexican historical drama film directed by Julián Soler and starring Armando Silvestre, Crox Alvarado, and Jaime Fernández. It is set around the time of the Spanish conquest of the Aztec Empire.

== Cast ==
- Armando Silvestre as Tlaltecalzin
- Crox Alvarado as Emperador Moctezuma
- Jaime Fernández as Nanoaltzin
- Magda Urvizu as Citlali
- Andrés Soler as Gran sacerdote
- Francisco Jambrina as Obispo Fray Juan de Zumárraga
- Miguel Manzano
- Manuel Calvo as Hernán Cortés
- Lilia del Carmen Camacho as La Virgen
- Arturo Soto Rangel as Bernardino
- Enrique García Álvarez as Fray Pedro de Gante
- José Chávez
- León Barroso as Fray Toribio de Benavente
- Enedina Díaz de León as Vieja nana indígena
- Antonio Bravo as Padre Francisco
- Armando Gutiérrez as Padre José
- Florencio Castelló as Fraile portero
- Margarito Luna
- Rubén Márquez
- Anna María Gómez
- Jorge Martínez de Hoyos as Juan Diego
- Isabel Vázquez 'La Chichimeca' as Mujer indígena

== Bibliography ==
- Emilio García Riera. Historia documental del cine mexicano: 1959-1960. Universidad de Guadalajara, 1994.
