= Don't Love Me So Much =

1949 film

- Directed by: Chano Urueta
- Written by: Eduardo Galindo; Chano Urueta
- Produced by: Pedro Galindo
- Starring: David Silva; Martha Roth; Arturo Martínez
- Cinematography: Víctor Herrera
- Edited by: Jorge Bustos
- Music by: Gonzalo Curiel
- Production company: Filmadora Chapultepec
- Release date: 15 July 1949
- Running time: 85 minutes
- Country: Mexico
- Language: Spanish

Don't Love Me So Much (Spanish: No me quieras tanto...) is a 1949 Mexican crime drama film directed by Chano Urueta and starring David Silva, Martha Roth and Arturo Martínez. It was shot at the Churubusco Studios in Mexico City. The film's sets were designed by the art director Ramón Rodríguez Granada.

== Cast ==
- David Silva as Gustavo
- Martha Roth as Diana
- Arturo Martínez as Mauricio del Valle
- Joaquín Cordero as Reynaldo
- José G. Cruz as Enrique Gutiérrez
- Carlos Múzquiz as Luis
- Julio Ahuet as El chupado, secuaz de Gustavo
- José Escanero as Padre de Mauricio
- Alfonso Alvarado as Comandante
- Alberto Sicardi as Bailarín
- Brenda Conde as Bailarina
- Alfredo Gil as Cantante
- Chucho Navarro as Cantante
- Hernando Avilés as Cantante

== Bibliography ==
- Riera, Emilio García. Historia documental del cine mexicano: 1949. Ediciones Era, 1969.
- Wilt, David E. The Mexican Filmography, 1916 through 2001. McFarland, 2024.
