= My Wife Is Not Mine =

1951 film

- Directed by: Fernando Soler
- Written by: Fernando Soler
- Based on: Mujercita Mia by Antonio Paso
- Produced by: Guillermo Calderón; Pedro A. Calderón
- Starring: Fernando Soler; Alicia Caro; Luis Aldás
- Cinematography: Rosalío Solano
- Edited by: Alfredo Rosas Priego
- Music by: Antonio Díaz Conde
- Production company: Producciones Calderón
- Release date: 18 October 1951
- Running time: 68 minutes
- Country: Mexico
- Language: Spanish

My Wife Is Not Mine (Spanish: Mi mujer no es mía) is a 1951 Mexican comedy film directed by Fernando Soler and starring Soler, Alicia Caro and Luis Aldás. It was shot at the Churubusco Studios in Mexico City. The film's sets were designed by the art director Manuel Fontanals.

== Synopsis ==
Pressured by his aunt Agustina to marry his cousin Esperanza, Antonio pretends he is already married to a woman named Gloria. Complications ensue when an attractive young woman then poses as Gloria.

== Cast ==
- Fernando Soler as Don Amable Sansoso
- Alicia Caro as Gloria/ Esperanza
- Luis Aldás as Antonio
- Irma Torres as Petra
- Ramón Gay as César Latorre
- Mimí Derba as Tía Agustina
- Alfredo Varela as Eulogio
- Amparo Arozamena as Charito Corrales
- Gloria Jordán as Conchita Manzano
- Ernesto Finance as Bendito

== Bibliography ==
- Riera, Emilio García. Historia documental del cine mexicano: 1949. Ediciones Era, 1969.
- Wilt, David E. The Mexican Filmography, 1916 through 2001. McFarland, 2024.
