= El jinete sin cabeza =

1957 film

El Jinete sin cabeza
- Directed by: Chano Urueta
- Written by: Ramón Obón
- Produced by: Luis Manrique
- Starring: Luis Aguilar; Flor Silvestre; Jaime Fernández; Pascual García Peña; Crox Alvarado; Patricia Nieto; Guillermo Cramer; Alberto Pedret; Elvira Lodi; Carlos Suárez
- Cinematography: Raúl Martínez Solares; Carlos Nájera
- Edited by: Carlos Savage; Gloria Schoemann; Pedro Velázquez
- Music by: Flor Silvestre
- Production company: Mier y Brooks
- Distributed by: Clasa-Mohme
- Release date: September 18, 1957
- Running time: 91 minutes
- Country: Mexico
- Language: Spanish

El jinete sin cabeza (English: The Headless Rider) is a 1957 Mexican horror Western film directed by Chano Urueta. The film centers on a mysterious stranger who rides into town as the locals begin talking about a legendary gunfighter as bodies soon litter the town in the stranger's wake.

== Plot ==
A small rural Mexican town hides a dark secret of a murderous and shadowy group of men wearing skull masks known as the Hermandad de Calaveras (Brotherhood of Skulls. The Brotherhood has been terrorizing the people in their quest for buying land which has a hidden value known to them. They value their secrecy to the point that thay condemned one of their own to death by capitation of his hands years before after he threatened to reveal the plot. When a mysterious stranger named Reinaldo rides into the same town, mysterious deaths begin to happen. The new judge, Margarita and the town's sheriff, Fernando are at first befuddled but the sheriff has a secret plan and an ally. The mysterious entombment of the town's leading citizen, Don Alvaro is the first tragedy. Soon superstition and the town's dark past grip all the townspeople as a rider wearing a black mask to appear headless. This masked man holds the key to unraveling the mystery. In time, Reinaldo as he is recognized as a skilled fighter and gunfighter by the town's doctor. As more deaths come, Reinaldo and his allies must stop the Bortherhood while saving the daughter, Julieta of Don Alvaro from a fiendish fate.

== Cast ==
- Luis Aguilar – Reinaldo, el jinete
- Flor Silvestre – Margarita, la jueza
- Jaime Fernández – Fernando
- Pascual García Peña – Pascual
- Crox Alvarado – Don Álvaro
- Patricia Nieto – Julieta
- Guillermo Cramer – Doctor J. González
- Alberto Pedret – Don Julián Méndez
- Elvira Lodi – Tía Clotilde
- Carlos Suárez – Don Carlos Bustamante
- Salvador Godínez – Miembro secta
- Fernando Osés – Miembro secta

== Production ==
El Jinete sin cabeza was the first film in what was originally a three-part serial called the "Headless Rider" series.

== Release ==
=== Home media ===
The film was released on DVD by Reyes on December 11, 2003. It was later released by Laguna Films on March 30, 2004.

== Reception ==
Author Michael R. Pitts in his book Western Movies: A Guide to 5,105 Feature Films called the film "[a] creepy, atmospheric horror western".
