= Red Rain (1950 film) =

1950 film

- Directed by: René Cardona
- Written by: Jesus Goytortua (novel); Mauricio Magdaleno
- Produced by: Gregorio Walerstein
- Starring: Jorge Negrete; Elsa Aguirre; Rodolfo Landa
- Cinematography: Agustín Martínez Solares
- Edited by: Rafael Ceballos
- Music by: Manuel Esperón
- Production company: Cinematográfica Filmex
- Release date: 26 January 1950
- Running time: 97 minutes
- Country: Mexico
- Language: Spanish

Red Rain (Spanish: Lluvia roja) is a 1950 Mexican war adventure film directed by René Cardona and starring Jorge Negrete, Elsa Aguirre and Rodolfo Landa. It was filmed at the Azteca Studios in Mexico City. Location shooting took place at the Hacienda Cocoyoc in Morelos. The film's sets were designed by the art director Jorge Fernández.

== Cast ==
- Jorge Negrete as Enrique Montero
- Elsa Aguirre as Elisa
- Rodolfo Landa as Gerardo
- Julio Villarreal as Don Federico
- Arturo Martínez as Licenciado
- Miguel Ángel Ferriz as General Medina
- Luis Aceves Castañeda as Othon
- Alejandro Cobo as Don Justo
- Quintín Bulnes as Enrique, el loco
- Jaime Calpe as Luisito
- Eduardo Arozamena as Dueño tienda
- Aurora Walker as Esposa de José María
- Enriqueta Reza as Juliana
- Narciso Busquets as Rolando Zúñga
- Fanny Schiller as Tía de Elisa
- Lupe Inclán as Perpetua
- Alicia Carrión as Colomba
- Carlos Múzquiz as Soldado
- Julio Ahuet as Porfirio Zúñiga
- Juan Orraca as Soldado
- Jorge Arriaga as Nicolás
- Alicia Caro as Cristina
- Domingo Soler as Don Tadeo
- Salvador Quiroz as José María
- Queta Lavat as Hermana de Elisa
- Víctor Alcocer as Soldado

== Bibliography ==
- Riera, Emilio García. Historia documental del cine mexicano: 1949-1950. Universidad de Guadalajara, 1992
- Wilt, David E. The Mexican Filmography, 1916 through 2001. McFarland, 2024.
