= El mundo de los vampiros =

- Directed by: Alfonso Corona Blake
- Written by: Alfredo Salazar (adaptation); Jesús Murcielago Velázquez (story)
- Produced by: Abel Salazar
- Starring: Mauricio Garcés; Erna Martha Bauman; Silvia Fournier; Guillermo Murray
- Music by: Gustavo César Carrión
- Release date: 1961
- Running time: 83 minutes
- Country: Mexico
- Language: Spanish

El mundo de los vampiros (The World of the Vampires) is a 1961 Mexican horror film, directed by Alfonso Corona Blake. The film is about a vampire, Count Sergio Subotai, who seeks revenge against the descendant of an enemy family. The hero is a musician (played by Mauricio Garcés) who knows how to play a piece of music that can kill vampires.

== Personnel ==
=== Cast ===
- Guillermo Murray as Count Sergio Subotai
- Mauricio Garces as Rudolph
- Erna Martha Baumann as Martha
- Sylvia Fournier as Leonora
- Alfredo W. Barron as The Hunchback Familiar
- Jose Baviera as The Girls' Father
- Mary Carmen Vela
- Alicia Moreno
- Yolanda Margain
- Carlos Nieto
