= Nazarín =

1959 film by Luis Buñuel

- Original poster
- Directed by: Luis Buñuel
- Screenplay by: Julio Alejandro; Luis Buñuel
- Based on: Nazarín (1895 novel) by Benito Pérez Galdós
- Produced by: Manuel Barbachano Ponce
- Starring: Marga López; Francisco Rabal; Rita Macedo; Ignacio López Tarso; Ofelia Guilmáin; Luis Aceves Castañeda; Noé Murayama; Rosenda Monteros
- Cinematography: Gabriel Figueroa
- Edited by: Carlos Savage
- Music by: Rodolfo Halffter
- Production company: Producciones Barbáchano Ponce
- Distributed by: Películas Nacionales
- Release date: 4 June 1959
- Running time: 94 minutes
- Country: Mexico
- Language: Spanish

Nazarín (Latin American Spanish: [nasaˈɾin]) is a 1959 Mexican satirical drama film directed by Luis Buñuel and co-written between Buñuel and Julio Alejandro, adapted from the eponymous 1895 novel of Spanish author Benito Pérez Galdós.

The film received the international prize at the 1959 Cannes Film Festival and was selected as the Mexican entry for the Best Foreign Language Film at the 32nd Academy Awards, but was not selected as a nominee.

Although not one of Buñuel's most renowned films, Nazarín still holds a high reputation. Filmmaker Andrei Tarkovsky named it one of his ten favorite films. In April 2019, a restoration was selected to be shown in the "Cannes Classics" section at the 2019 Cannes Film Festival.

== Plot ==
Father Nazario, a priest living in a hostel, is quiet, temperate and distributes his money, even indifferent to being burgled. He shows understanding and compassion to such as Beatriz, who has psychotic episodes and suicidal thoughts after being abandoned by her lover, Pinto.

A prostitute, Andara, runs into Nazario's room seeking shelter; she has murdered another prostitute and been wounded. Nazario withholds judgement and helps to conceal her. He tries to make her conscious of her sin. Andara hallucinates that a portrait of Jesus Christ is laughing at her. Beatriz warns them that someone has informed the authorities. Meanwhile, the hostel proprietress finds out and insists Andara must not be discovered with Nazario, ordering her to remove evidence of her stay. After Nazario has left, Andara sets the room ablaze and escapes.

With Nazario afoul of the law and church, he is warned an investigation could cost him his priesthood. Having no possessions – all stolen or given away – he adopts plain clothes and wanders the country, begging. Meeting a construction crew, Nazario offers to work for food, but other workers resent him undercutting them. They shun him, so Nazario leaves with nothing. His motives are also misunderstood, so a fight between the workers and the foreman ensues.

"As if by a miracle," Nazario sees Beatriz again in another town. He reveals his possessions have been stolen. She leads him to Andara, who lives with her, and a sick girl whose mother begs Nazario to cure with a miracle. Nazario suggests a doctor, but offers to pray with them. He is perturbed when the woman performs superstitious rites. The girl's fever subsides. Believing Nazario to be a miracle-worker, Andara and Beatriz follow him despite his protests.

Nazario stops to help a party whose horse has a broken leg. The Colonel yells at a peasant who does not salute them, despite the peasant's protestations that he didn't see them. When Nazario criticises the Colonel's rudeness, the latter tries to pull his gun, but is stopped by the Priest, who excuses Nazario as "a heretic, an erratic preacher" who should be left alone.

Nazario is followed by Beatriz and Andara, whom he reluctantly tolerates, and sermonizes them. In a plague-ridden village, Nazario's help is rejected by one dying woman, who prefers her husband's ministrations (inspired by the Marquis de Sade's Dialogue Between a Priest and a Dying Man). Nazario is overcome by a feeling of failure.

A midget professes love for Andara despite saying she is ugly. Beatrice's ex Pinto, visiting, sees her, accuses her of being "a priest's lover" and demands that she leave with him. Nazario says she is struggling with Satan but should resist. When she asks how he guessed something was wrong, Nazario responds, "It's not guessing; it's knowing." Andara insists that they flee. Nazario responds only thieves flee and the divine will not forsake them. Beatriz tells Nazario she trusts him, and quotes from the Bible: "If I can carry your load on my back, I will". Andara accuses Nazario of preferring Beatriz, but he asserts a Christian love for both.

Discovered by a search party, Andara and Nazario are arrested: Beatriz begs for his release. Pinto tells Beatriz's mother that Beatriz should go with him. However, Beatriz sings Nazario's praises and speaks of his miracles. Her mother's response that Beatriz loves Nazario "like a man" sends Beatriz into a psychotic episode.

Nazario's cellmates insult and assault him. Nazario suffers a crisis of faith, shouting, "For the first time in my life, I find it hard to forgive. But I forgive you. It is my Christian duty. But I also scorn you! And I feel guilty, not knowing how to separate scorn from forgiveness." A cellmate intervenes and Nazario gives him his money.

Nazario is accused of insanity and disobedience. As he is led away, Pinto and Beatriz pass by, but without recognition. Nazario passes a fruit seller who offers a pineapple, saying, "Take this charity, and may God be with you." Nazario seems overcome with confusion. He refuses it twice, but then takes it and says, "May God repay you." He is led away, distraught.

== Cast ==
- Francisco Rabal as Father Nazario
- Marga López as Beatriz
- Rita Macedo as Andara
- Jesús Fernández as Hugo
- Ignacio López Tarso as Thief in church
- Luis Aceves Castañeda as Parricide
- Ofelia Guilmáin as Chanfa
- Noé Murayama as Pinto
- Rosenda Monteros as Prieta
- Victorio Blanco as Old prisoner
- Arturo Castro as Colonel
- José Chávez Trowe as Construction site manager
- Cecilia Leger as Woman with pineapple
- Ignacio Peón as Priest

== Reception ==
On review aggregator website Rotten Tomatoes, Nazarín has an 86% approval rating based on reviews from 14 critics, and an average rating of 8.3/10.

The film was included by the Vatican in a list of important films compiled in 1995, under the category of "Religion". Catholic deacon and film critic Steven Greydanus has noted some of the film's implicit skepticism of religion, and surmises that it was included in the Vatican's list for its willingness to at least engage with the question of religion.

== See also ==
- List of submissions to the 32nd Academy Awards for Best Foreign Language Film
- List of Mexican submissions for the Academy Award for Best Foreign Language Film
