= Julio Villarreal =

Spanish-born actor based in Mexico

- Born: 7 November 1885; Madrid, Spain
- Died: 4 August 1958 (aged 72); Mexico City, Mexico
- Other name: Aurelio Julio Avelino Crochet Martínez
- Occupations: Actor, Director
- Years active: 1930–1958 (film)

Julio Villarreal (7 November 1885 – 4 August 1958) was a Spanish actor who later settled and worked in Mexico. He also directed two films in the early 1930s.

Born as Julio Crochet i Martínez Villarreal in Madrid to a family of theater actors, he moved to Argentina and Perú in 1900, then returned to Spain in 1921. After the Spanish Civil War, Julio moved to the United States and in 1932 he finally settled in Mexico City.

He acted in many Mexican movies of the Golden Age of Mexican cinema along with many stars such as María Félix, Cantinflas, Pedro Infante and Jorge Negrete who became his son in law by marrying Elisa Christy (Elisa Crochet Asperó), daughter of Julio Villarreal.

== Selected filmography ==
- El rey de los gitanos (1933)
- Sanctuary (1933)
- The Call of the Blood (1934)
- Juarez and Maximilian (1934)
- Gold and Silver (1934)
- Café Concordia (1939)
- The Unknown Policeman (1941)
- The Count of Monte Cristo (1942)
- The Saint Who Forged a Country (1942)
- Alejandra (1942)
- I Danced with Don Porfirio (1942)
- Simón Bolívar (1942)
- The Rebel (1943)
- Christopher Columbus (1943)
- Michael Strogoff (1944)
- My Lupe and My Horse (1944)
- The White Monk (1945)
- Twilight (1945)
- Adultery (1945)
- Bugambilia (1945)
- The House of the Fox (1945)
- The Road to Sacramento (1946)
- The Devourer (1946)
- Dizziness (1946)
- Pepita Jiménez (1946)
- Honeymoon (1947)
- Fly Away, Young Man! (1947)
- The Newlywed Wants a House (1948)
- Rough But Respectable (1949)
- Philip of Jesus (1949)
- Confessions of a Taxi Driver (1949)
- The Torch (1950)
- Red Rain (1950)
- The Little House (1950)
- Doña Perfecta (1951)
- Maria Islands (1951)
- The Woman You Want (1952)
- The Night Falls (1952)
- When the Fog Lifts (1952)
- The Photographer (1953)
- I Want to Live (1953)
- Take Me in Your Arms (1954)
- The Price of Living (1954)
- Father Against Son (1955)
- Here Are the Aguilares! (1957)

== Bibliography ==
- Paco Ignacio Taibo. María Félix: 47 pasos por el cine. Bruguera, 2008.
