= Carlos Riquelme =

Mexican actor

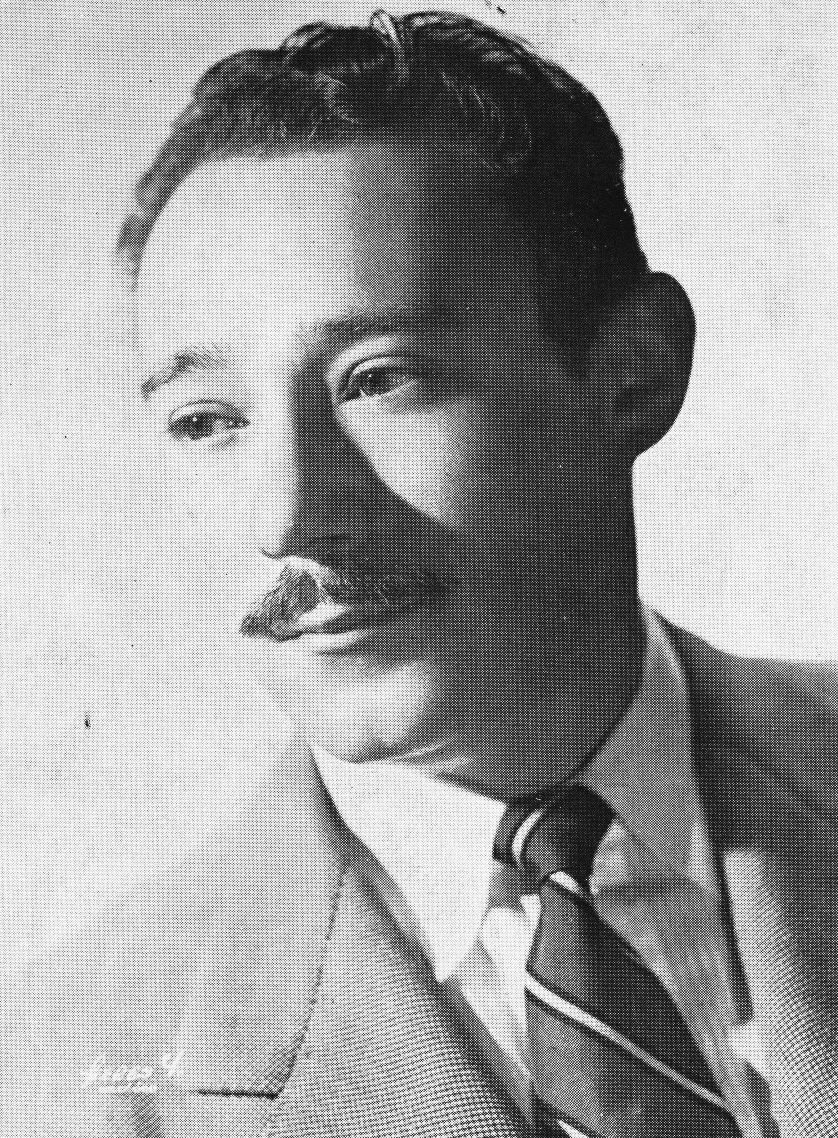
- Riquelme in 1954
- Born: 13 May 1914; Mexico City, Mexico
- Died: 17 May 1990 (aged 76); Mexico City, Mexico
- Occupation: Actor
- Years active: 1939-1989

Carlos Riquelme (13 May 1914 – 17 May 1990) was a Mexican film actor. He appeared in 160 films between 1939 and 1989.

== Selected filmography ==
- Adam, Eve and the Devil (1945)
- Adventure in the Night (1948)
- The Fallen Angel (1949)
- A Family Like Many Others (1949)
- Black Angustias (1950)
- The Absentee (1951)
- In the Flesh (1951)
- Now I Am Rich (1952)
- Rossana (1953)
- The Boy and the Fog (1953)
- The Ghost Falls In Love (1953)
- To the Four Winds (1955)
- A Woman's Devotion (1956)
- Rebel Without a House (1960)
- Neighborhood of Champions (1981)
- Under the Volcano (1984)
- The Milagro Beanfield War (1988)
