= Reportaje =

1953 film by Emilio Fernández

- Directed by: Emilio Fernández
- Written by: Emilio Fernández; Julio Alejandro
- Produced by: A.N.D.A, PECIME, Televisa (Telesistema Mexicano)
- Starring: Pedro Infante; Jorge Negrete; María Félix; Dolores del Río; Tin Tan
- Cinematography: Alex Phillips
- Edited by: Gloria Schoemann
- Music by: Antonio Díaz Conde
- Release date: 1953
- Running time: 103 minutes
- Country: Mexico
- Language: Spanish

Reportaje ("Report News") is a 1953 Mexican film. The film brought together an extraordinary ensemble cast of the most important stars of the Golden Age of Mexican cinema and was held for charitable purposes for the National Association of Actors (ANDA) of México.

The film is divided into 6 chapters around a principal storyline. It was released in a special presentation in the 1954 Cannes Film Festival.

== Plot ==
The owner of a daily paper wants to find the most important news on New Year's Eve. Therefore, he decides to send his top reporters to strategic points in Mexico City.

=== Chapter 1: The Hospital ===
One of the reporters arrives at the hospital and finds his wife about to give birth. Upon entering the hospital, he witnesses a number of peculiar cases.

==== Cast ====
- Roberto Cañedo
- María Elena Marqués
- Columba Domínguez
- Carmen Montejo
- Esther Fernández
- Ernesto Alonso
- Miroslava
- Miguel Torrúco
- Julio Villarreal
- Amanda del Llano
- Ramón Gay

=== Chapter 2: The Police Station ===
The head of a police station is forced to deal with several comedic cases that involve rather peculiar characters.

==== Cast ====
- Carlos López Moctezuma
- Antonio Espino "Clavillazo"
- Germán Valdés "Tin-Tan"
- Narcelo Chávez
- Meche Barba
- Irma Torres
- Wolf Rubinskis

=== Chapter 3: The House of a Rich Man ===
The reporter shows up at a party hosted by one of the city's richest men, who is about to propose to his fiancee. However, a sudden malaise makes evident that he does not have much time left.

==== Cast ====
- Pedro Infante
- Carmen Sevilla
- Domingo Soler
- Carmelita González
- Armando Silvestre
- Manolo Fábregas

=== Chapter 4: The Show Center ===
Several stars are trying to get ahead in a show center. In the middle of the performance, a rich man is blackmailed by two peculiar thieves.

==== Cast ====
- Libertad Lamarque
- Pedro Vargas
- Lola Flores
- Andres Soler
- Fernando Soler
- Pedro Lopez Lagar
- Joaquín Pardavé
- Luis Aldás

=== Chapter 5: The Divorce ===
The owner of the Daily returns home, where his beautiful wife asks for a divorce. The couple begins to remember details of their happy years.

==== Cast ====
- Dolores del Río
- Arturo de Córdova

=== Chapter 6: The Hotel ===
In a hotel room, a couple of young stars are having a fight: the man (a singer) is unwilling to get out of bed. To his surprise, a particularly beautiful woman shows up.

==== Cast ====
- María Félix
- Jorge Negrete

== Details ==
Renowned Mexican comedian Cantinflas refused to act in the film without a salary—apparently the other stars did perform without pay.

Mexican actor Pedro Armendáriz was announced as a cast member in several magazines at the time; however, he does not appear in the film.
