= The Ghost Falls In Love =

1953 film by Rafael Portillo

- Directed by: Rafael Portillo
- Written by: Rafael Portillo; Alfredo Salazar
- Starring: Gloria Marín; Abel Salazar; Ramón Gay
- Cinematography: Rosalío Solano
- Edited by: José W. Bustos
- Music by: Francisco Argote
- Production company: Tucsa
- Release date: 26 June 1953
- Running time: 80 minutes
- Country: Mexico
- Language: Spanish

The Ghost Falls In Love (Spanish: El fantasma se enamora) is a 1953 Mexican comedy film directed by Rafael Portillo and starring Gloria Marín, Abel Salazar and Ramón Gay.

== Cast ==
- Gloria Marín
- Abel Salazar
- Ramón Gay
- Aurora Walker
- Arturo Soto Rangel
- Carlos Riquelme

== Bibliography ==
- Amador, María Luisa. Cartelera cinematográfica, 1950-1959. UNAM, 1985.
