= Jorge Martínez de Hoyos =

Mexican film actor (1920–1997)

- Born: September 25, 1920; Mexico City, Mexico
- Died: May 6, 1997 (aged 76)
- Spouse: Alicia Caro (m. 1965)

Jorge Martínez de Hoyos (September 25, 1920 – May 6, 1997) was a Mexican actor whose career spanned five decades from the 1940s till his death. He appeared in both American and Mexican films and television, with prominent roles in The Magnificent Seven and Viento negro (Black Wind).

He married actress Alicia Caro after the pair met on the set of the 1965 film Cien gritos de terror. They remained married for 32 years until he died from lung cancer on May 6, 1997.

== Selected filmography ==
- Corner Stop (1948) – Rabanito
- A Family Like Many Others (1949) – Anunciador en fiesta (uncredited)
- Hay lugar para dos (1949) – (uncredited)
- Confessions of a Taxi Driver (1949) – Luis
- Cuatro contra el mundo (1950) – Don Nacho (uncredited)
- Pobre corazón (1950) – Invitado a fiesta (uncredited)
- Pata de palo (1950) – Ferrocarrilero (uncredited)
- Entre tu amor y el cielo (1950)
- The Cry of the Flesh (1951) – Invitado a fiesta
- Vivillo desde chiquillo (1951) – Policía (uncredited)
- They Say I'm a Communist (1951) – Miembro del comité (uncredited)
- Mexican Bus Ride (1952) – Guia de turistas (uncredited)
- Montana Territory (1952) – Road Agent (uncredited)
- Now I Am Rich (1952) – Vendedor (uncredited)
- The Woman You Want (1952)
- The Mystery of the Express Car (1953)
- Los dineros del diablo (1953) – Doctor (uncredited)
- Sueños de gloria (1953) – Jerónimo (uncredited)
- Untouched (1954) – Pedro González
- El Túnel 6 (1955) – José
- The Treasure of Pancho Villa (1955) – Revolutionary (uncredited)
- La doncella de piedra (1956) – Airapúa
- Comanche (1956) – (uncredited)
- Where the Circle Ends (1956) – Inspector Carlos Carrillo
- The Hidden One (1956) – Máximo Tepal
- Death in the Garden (1956) – Captain Ferrero
- Los amantes (1956)
- Canasta de cuentos mexicanos (1956) – Hombre de las canastas (segment "Canasta")
- Dios no lo quiera (1957) – Chema
- La mafia del crimen (1958)
- Una golfa (1958) – Toño
- Ama a tu prójimo (1958) – Entrenador
- La sonrisa de la Virgen (1958) – Anselmo
- Café Colón (1959) – Coronel Simón Sánchez
- Sábado negro (1959)
- Beyond All Limits (1959) – Rafael Ortega
- La reina del cielo (1959) – Gran cacique
- The Miracle Roses (1960) – Juan Diego
- The Magnificent Seven (1960) – Hilario
- Mañana serán hombres (1961) – don Efrén Maldonado
- Hidden Paradise (1962) – Don Lorenzo
- Las recién casadas (1962) – Juan
- Un día de diciembre (1962)
- Tlayucan (1962) – Padre Aurelio, señor cura
- ...Qué hacer con mis hijos... (1962)
- Los Chacales (1963)
- Cinco asesinos esperan (1964)
- 100 Cries of Terror (1965) – Dr. Javier Medina (segment "Miedo supremo")
- Nido de águilas (1965) – El Tigre
- Black Wind (1965) – Ulalio
- Smoky (1966) – Pepe
- Tiempo de morir (1966) – Juan Sayago
- The Professionals (1966) – Padillia
- El secreto del texano (1966)
- Day of the Evil Gun (1968) – Guillermo – DeLeon's Second in Command (uncredited)
- Guns for San Sebastian (1968) – Felipe Cayetano
- Valentín de la Sierra (1968)
- Suave patria (1968)
- La manzana de la discordia (1968)
- La trinchera (1969)
- The Adventurers (1970) – El Condor
- The Bridge in the Jungle (1971) – Agustin
- Furias bajo el cielo (1971)
- The Garden of Aunt Isabel (1971) – Capitaine de Ballesteros
- Los días del amor (1972) – Vicente Icaza
- The Revengers (1972) – Cholo
- Those Years (1973) – Benito Juárez
- La venida del Rey Olmos (1975)
- El cumpleaños del perro (1975) – Jorge Maldonado
- La India (1976) – El Maestro
- Las Poquianchis (1976) – Don Rosario
- Lo mejor de Teresa (1976) – Tío Eleazar
- Los hermanos del viento (1977) – Federico
- The Divine Caste (1977) – General Salvador Alvarado
- Los amantes frios (1978) – Librado (segment "Los Amantes frios")
- Crónica íntima (1979)
- Una leyenda de amor (1982) – Padre Diego
- Aquel famoso Remington (1982)
- Pesadilla (1985) – Narrator
- La habitación que silva (1985) – Narrator
- La dama solitaria (1985) – Narrator
- Dulce espiritu (1985) – Narrator
- Damian (1985) – Narrator
- Astucia (1986)
- Murieron a la mitad del rio (1986) – Don Chebo
- Días difíciles (1988) – Senador Domínguez
- Lonesome Dove (1989, TV Mini-Series) – Po Campo
- Cronos (1993) – Narrator (voice)
- A Trickle of Blood (1995) – Don Manuel
- Oedipo alcalde (1996) – Cura

=== Television appearances ===
- El pecado de Oyuki (1988) – Sir Charles Pointer
- El abuelo y yo (1992) – Don Joaquín
- Pueblo chico, infierno grande (1997) – Chucho Ríos
- Alondra (1995) - Alfredito

== See also ==
- TVyNovelas Award for Best Lead Actor
