= Ana Libia =

- Born: Tierra Blanca, Veracruz, Mexico
- Origin: Mexico City
- Died: 16 October 2023
- Genres: Bolero
- Occupation(s): Singer, vocalist
- Instrument: Vocals
- Years active: 1950s–2010s
- Labels: Orfeón, Peerless, Regis

Ana Libia (died 16 October 2023) was a Mexican singer of bolero music.

Born in Tierra Blanca, Veracruz, she was noted for her work with songwriter and composer Gonzalo Curiel in the late 1950s. As the vocalist of Curiel's orchestra, she recorded the Curiel song "Luna amiga", which was included in the compilation album Ritmo candente, vol. II (1958), released by Orfeón.

In 1965, she recorded a studio album titled Veracruz with pianist Everardo Ortiz. This record was later reissued with the title Éxitos de Toña la Negra by Suave Records. She was a frequent guest performer on Jorge Saldaña's television program Nostalgia in the 1980s and performed several songs in the program's 13th anniversary episode.

Her brother, Víctor Manuel Sosa, was a notable singer of Mexican folk songs in the 1970s.

== Discography (partial) ==
- Veracruz (Regis, 1965)
- Recuerdos del ayer
- Sí, señor
