= Gonzalo Curiel (composer) =

Mexican composer and musician

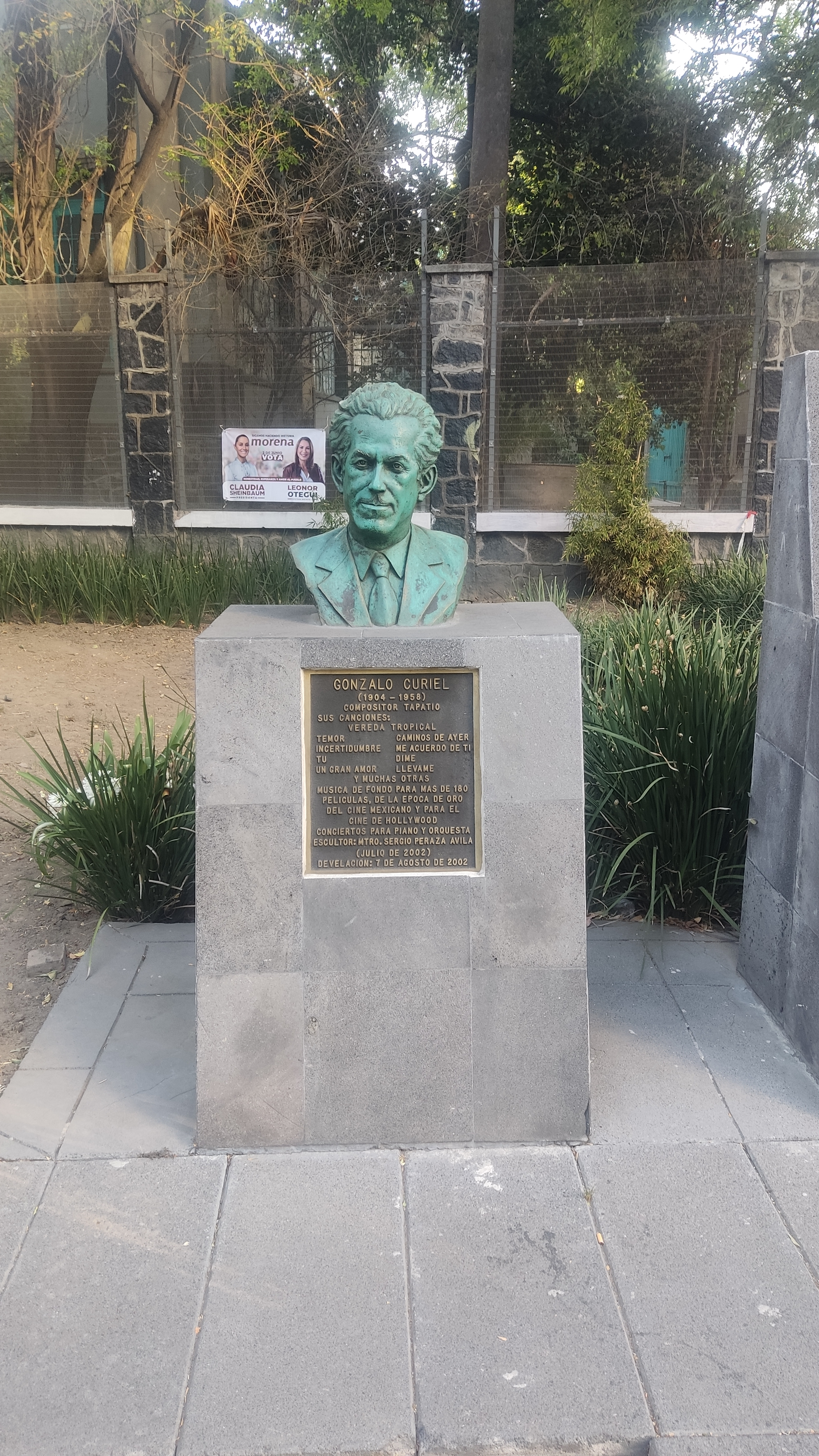
- Bust in Plaza de los Compositores, Mexico City
- Born: Gonzalo Curiel Barba; 10 January 1904; Guadalajara, Jalisco, Mexico
- Died: 4 July 1958; Mexico City, Mexico
- Occupation: Composer
- Years active: 1934-1958 (film)

Gonzalo Curiel Barba (commonly Gonzalo Curiel; 10 January 1904 – 4 July 1958) was a Mexican film composer. He was active during the Golden Age of Mexican cinema.

== Life ==
=== Early life ===
Gonzalo Curiel was born in Guadalajara, Mexico to Juan N. Curiel and María de Jesús Barba Riestra. Curiel had 2 siblings, Juan Luis Curiel Barba, and María Elisa Curiel Barba.

Curiel learned many instruments at a young age, was taught piano at 6, and learned guitar and the violin. However, after a 5-year stay in Los Angeles to escape the Mexican Revolution from 1917 to 1922 while studying music under Zez Confrey, Curiel unwillingly studied in medicine due to the pressure of his father, but by 1927 Curiel had stopped studying medicine to start a career as a pianist.

=== Piano career ===
To start his career, Curiel moved to Mexico City and started to record piano rolls. Soon, he played professionally in the XEW-AM radio station, this got the recognition of the opera singer Alfonso Ortiz Tirado, who in 1931, hired Curiel as an accompanist for one year.

During the tour, Curiel attempted to gain fame and a status by performing in many other radio stations, as well as playing in the vocal quartet "Los caballeros de la harmony" (or just "Los Caballeros quartet").

After the tour, Curiel successfully gained recognition, soon he created a musical group called "Grupo Ritarmelo", this group originally contained Emilio Tuero, Gil Calderon and Ciro Calderón, later on Pablo and Carlos Martínez Gil would also join this group, this group, along with some others, became famous in Mexico and made Curiel well-known. This collection of groups created a Mexican music society called "Escuadrón del Ritmo", the Escuadrón del Ritmo performed many compositions of its members (including Curiel's) and toured countries like Mexico, America, Brazil, Argentina, Chile. It was particularly successful with the XEW Radio station and had many collaborations, such as the singers "The Aguila sisters" (also known as "Las Hermanes Águila").

In the late 1950s, singer Ana Libia was the vocalist of his orchestra. Together, they recorded his song "Luna amiga", which was included in the Orfeón compilation album Ritmo candente, vol. II (1958).

=== SMACEM/SACM ===
In 1939, Gonzalo Curiel, members of the Mexican Association of Authors and Composers (AMAC), members of the Escuadrón del Ritmo orchestra, some publishing companies, and other individual artists created the "Sindicato Mexicano de Autores, Compositores y Editores de Música" or SMACEM, the creation of the group was to strengthen the economic stability of writers and artists of Mexico, basing its purpose of collecting Author's right from the 8th title of Civil code of 1928. On 22 February 1945, the members wrote an agreement under "Civil entity code" that created the Society of Authors and Composers of Mexico, or SACM. The objective was to protect the rights of artists, primarily authors and composers, from publishing companies and to keep financial ties with the copyrights of their works, this objective was finally reached a month later on 22 March 1945. Curiel was President of the Board of Directors for 2 periods.

=== Death ===
On 4 July 1958, Curiel died of a myocardial infarction at age 54 in his home, he was buried in the Panteón Jardín de San Ángel, in Mexico City.

=== Achievements and legacy ===
Due to Curiel's contributions to Mexican film culture, he was nominated for his film music. Most significantly, the 1954 Ariel Award for Best Original Score for the film Eugenia Grandet, he was also nominated in 1958, however did not win.

After his death, in the Compositores Mexicanos neighbourhood in Mexico City, a road is named after him.

SACM awarded Curiel with the 2009 "Juventino Rosas Posthumous Recognition" prize.

== Compositions ==
Curiel was an active composer throughout most of his life, his compositions were frequently performed by the Escuadrón del Ritmo and other orchestras. His works were primarily for Mexican cinema, and as such Curiel was a major contributor to the Mexican Golden age of cinema. However, Curiel wrote works in other genres, including instrumental works and songs.

=== Selected filmography ===
Curiel's work and musical talent was dedicated to mostly Mexican film, he had written approximately 180 pieces of musical work for film music. The most notable are listed below:

- Santa (1943)
- A Woman's Diary (1944)
- The Hour of Truth (1945)
- The Mulatta of Cordoba (1945)
- I Am a Fugitive (1946)
- Fly Away, Young Man! (1947)
- The Shadow of the Bridge (1948)
- The Genius (1948)
- Juan Charrasqueado (1948)
- The Newlywed Wants a House (1948)
- Spurs of Gold (1948)
- The Fallen Angel (1949)
- Opium (1949)
- Love in Every Port (1949)
- Don't Love Me So Much (1949)
- The Magician (1949)
- Doctor on Call (1950)
- Black Angustias (1950)
- Treacherous (1950)
- Beauty Salon (1951)
- The Cry of the Flesh (1951)
- Stolen Paradise (1951)
- We Maids (1951)
- Among Lawyers I See You (1951)
- Streetwalker (1951)
- Paco the Elegant (1952)
- Private Secretary (1952)
- Seven Women (1953)
- The Three Elenas (1954)
- After the Storm (1955)
- Look What Happened to Samson (1955)
- The Bandits of Cold River (1956)
- Barefoot Sultan (1956)
- A Few Drinks (1958)

=== Piano concertos ===
Curiel had written 3 piano concertos, the 2nd being partially lost but recovered by Arturo Rodríguez, and the 3rd left unfinished with only 1 movement.

- Piano Concerto no. 1 (1948?) (3 movements; D♭ major)
- Piano Concerto no. 2 (1950) (3 movements; D minor)
- Piano Concerto no. 3 (Incomplete, premiered 1967) (1 movement)

=== Selected songs ===
Curiel was a co-author to many songs and "Popular Music".

- Vereda tropical
- Noche de Luna
- Incertidumbre
- Un Gran Amor
- Temor
- Desesperanza
- Son tus ojos verde mar
- Sorpresa (Music by Gonzalo Curiel. Lyrics by Alfonso Espriú Herrera)
- Traicionera
- Morena linda
- Dime
- Caminos de ayer
- Tu Partida (Music by Gonzalo Curiel. Lyrics by Ricardo López Méndez)
- Déjame (Music by Gonzalo Curiel. Lyrics by Ricardo López Méndez)

== Bibliography ==
- Andrew Grant Wood. Agustin Lara: A Cultural Biography. OUP USA, 2014.
