= Luis Aceves Castañeda =

Mexican actor

- Born: 2 September 1913; Aguascalientes, Mexico
- Died: 16 September 1973 (aged 60); Mexico City, Mexico
- Occupation: Actor
- Years active: 1945-1965 (film)

Luis Aceves Castañeda (1913–1973) was a Mexican film actor.

== Selected filmography ==
- Juan Charrasqueado (1948)
- Philip of Jesus (1949)
- Red Rain (1950)
- Maria Islands (1951)
- A Place Near Heaven (1952)
- Mexican Bus Ride (1952)
- Wuthering Heights (1954)
- The Aztec Mummy (1957)
- The Curse of the Aztec Mummy (1957)
- Nazarín (1959)

== Bibliography ==
- Paietta, Ann C. Saints, Clergy and Other Religious Figures on Film and Television, 1895–2003. McFarland, 2005.
