= Marga López =

Mexican actress

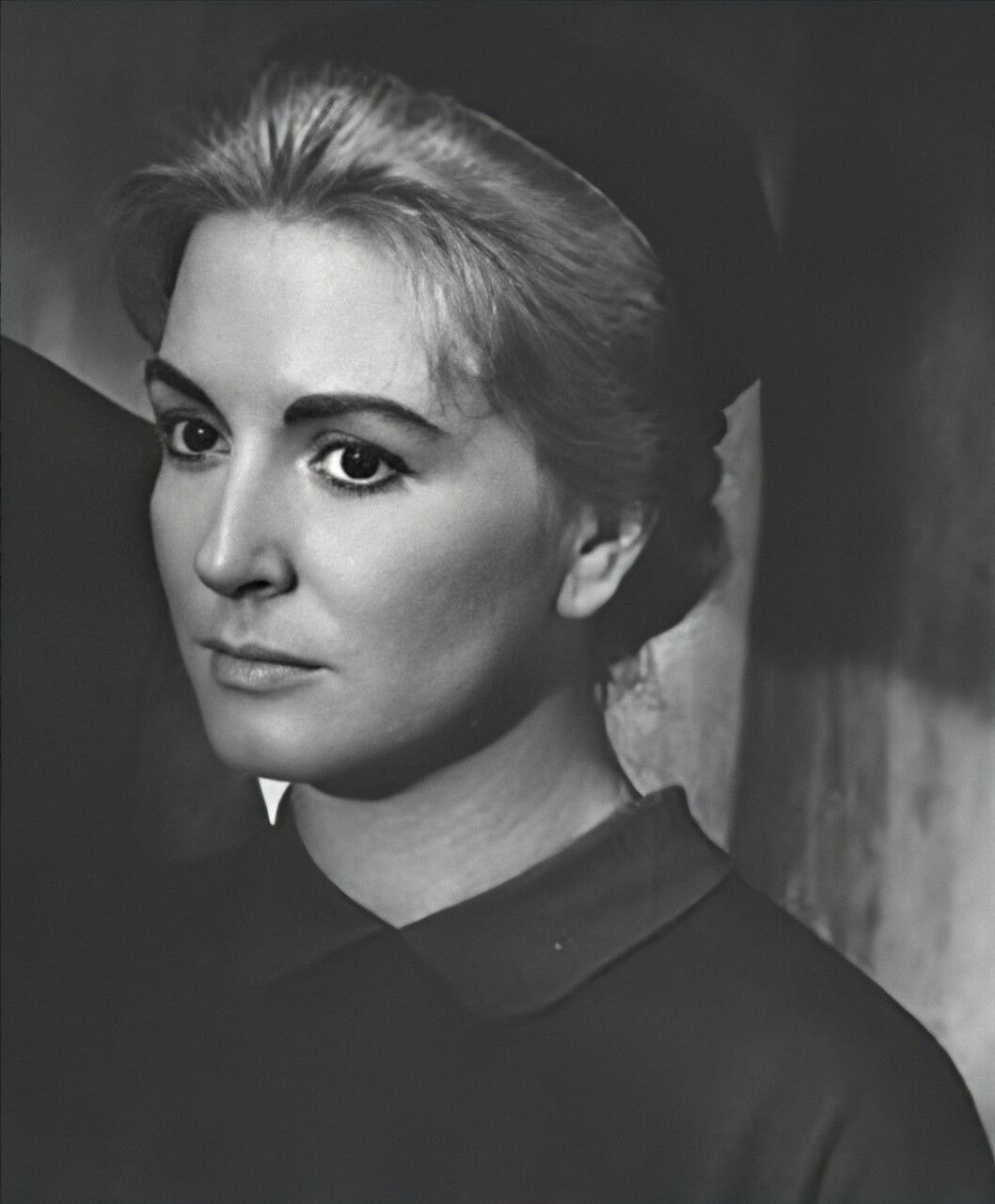
- López in El hombre de la isla (1960)
- Born: Catalina Margarita López Ramos; June 21, 1924; San Miguel de Tucumán, Argentina
- Died: July 4, 2005 (aged 81); Mexico City, Mexico
- Occupation: Actress
- Years active: 1945-2005
- Spouses: Carlos Amador (m. 1941; div. 1956) Carlos Amador (m. 1961; div. 1962) Arturo de Córdova (m. 1964; died 1973)
- Children: 2
- Awards: Ariel Award for Best Actress; 1955 La entrega Ariel Award for Best Actress; 1950 Salón México; Ariel Award for Best Actress; 1948 Soledad

Catalina Margarita López Ramos (Spanish pronunciation: [ˈmaɾɣa ˈlopes]; June 21, 1924 – July 4, 2005), known professionally as Marga López, was an Argentine-born Mexican actress.

== Biography ==
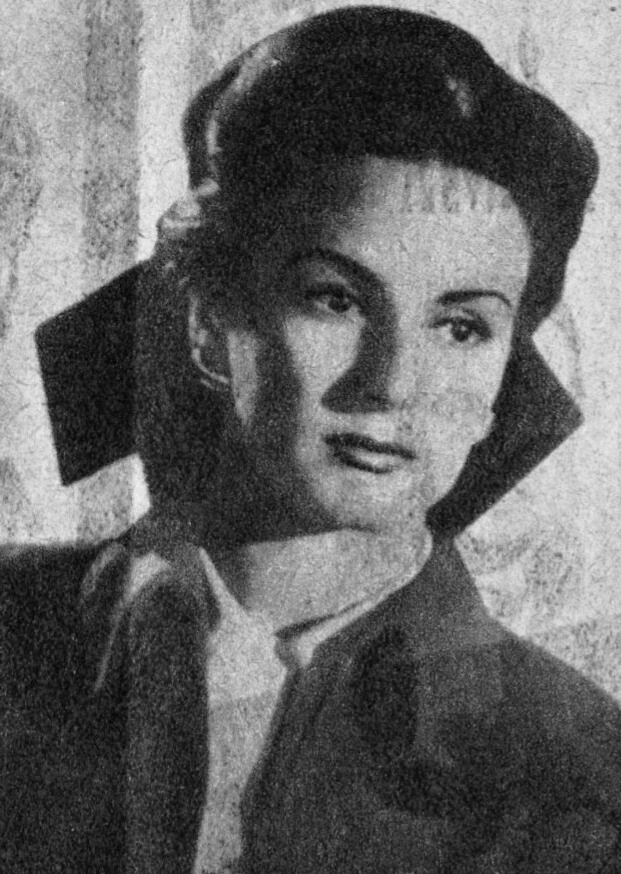
Marga López in 1951

Born Catalina Margarita López Ramos on June 21, 1924, in San Miguel de Tucumán, Argentina. Even though she was born in Argentina, she later acquired Mexican citizenship. Her parents were Pedro López Sánchez and Dolores Ramos Nava. She had six siblings: Juan, Miguel, Dolores, Pedro, María and Manuel. She debuted in show business in her home country as a child, with her siblings, in the group known as Los Hermanitos López.

In 1936, the group journeyed through Latin America, including Mexico. There she met her future husband, Carlos Amador, a cinema producer, whom she married twice, in 1941 and in 1961. They had two children, Carlos and Manuel. In 1964, she married actor Arturo de Córdova, who died in 1973. They acted together in Sinful. She was the sister of the outstanding guitarist, concert guitarist, and teacher Manuel López Ramos, founder of Estudio de Arte Guitarrístico and considered a pioneer in the teaching of classical guitar in Mexico.

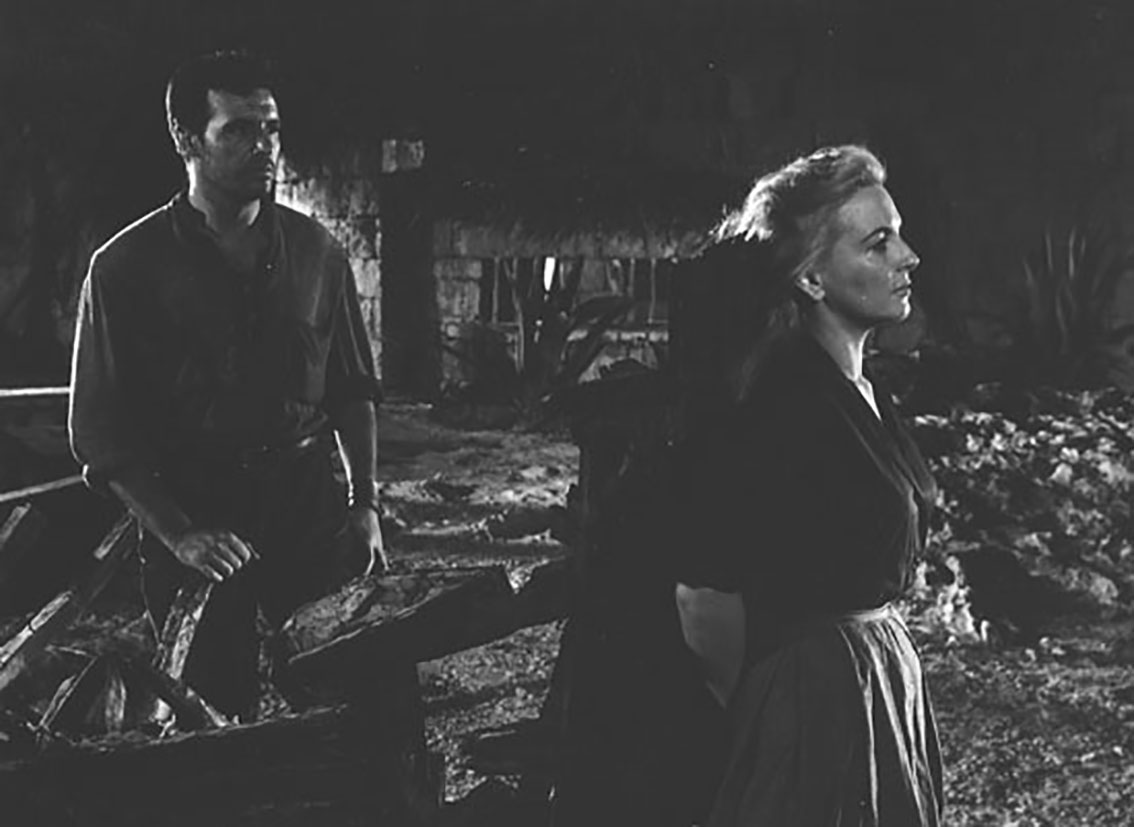
López with Francisco Rabal in El hombre de la isla (1960)

Her debut in Mexican cinema was in the role of a waitress in the film El hijo disobediente, directed by Humberto Gómez Landero, in 1945. Later in 1959, she shared the big screen with Rita Macedo in Nazarín a film by Luis Buñuel. She appeared in more than 80 movies in the Golden Age of Mexican cinema, sharing credits with Pedro Infante, Luis Aguilar, Ernesto Alonso, Tin Tan and Amparo Rivelles. She also appeared in many telenovelas, her last one being Bajo la misma piel.

In 2004 she attended the Chamizal Independent Film Festival, in El Paso, Texas and in Ciudad Juárez, Chihuahua. Among her film roles, she is known for appearances in Salón México (1949) and Nazarín (1959), co-starring with Ignacio López Tarso.

== Death ==
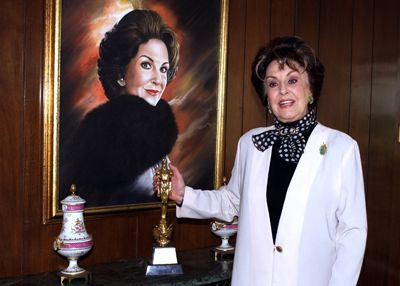
López in 2002

By 2005, she was an emphysema patient and had acute episodes of bronchitis. Reportedly, she was a chain smoker and did not give up tobacco until 2004. On Tuesday, 19 April 2005, she suffered a heart attack while undergoing a health check-up test at a hospital in Mexico City. She died on July 4, 2005, from cardiac arrhythmia.

== Telenovelas ==
- Bajo la misma piel (2003–2004) as Esther Escalante de Ortiz.
- Entre el amor y el odio (2002) as Josefa Villarreal.
- El manantial (2001–2002) como Madre Superiora.
- Aventuras en el tiempo (2001) as Urraca Valdepeña.
- Carita de ángel (2001) como Madre General Asunción de la Lúz.
- La casa en la playa (2000) as Serena Rivas.
- El privilegio de amar (1998–1999) as Ana Joaquina Velarde.
- Mujer, casos de la vida real (1997) (Episodio: ¿Qué está pasando?)
- Te sigo amando (1996–1997) as Montserrat.
- Lazos de amor (1995–1996) as Mercedes Iturbe.
- Alondra (1995) as Leticia del Bosque. †
- La hora marcada (1989) as Martha
- Caminemos (1980) como Aurora.
- Añoranza (1979) as Magdalena.
- Ven conmigo (1975)
- El juramento (1974)
- Las máscaras (1971) as Márgara.
- Concierto de almas (1969) as Magda.
- Cynthia (1968) as Cynthia.
- Las momias de Guanajuato (1962)

== Selected filmography ==
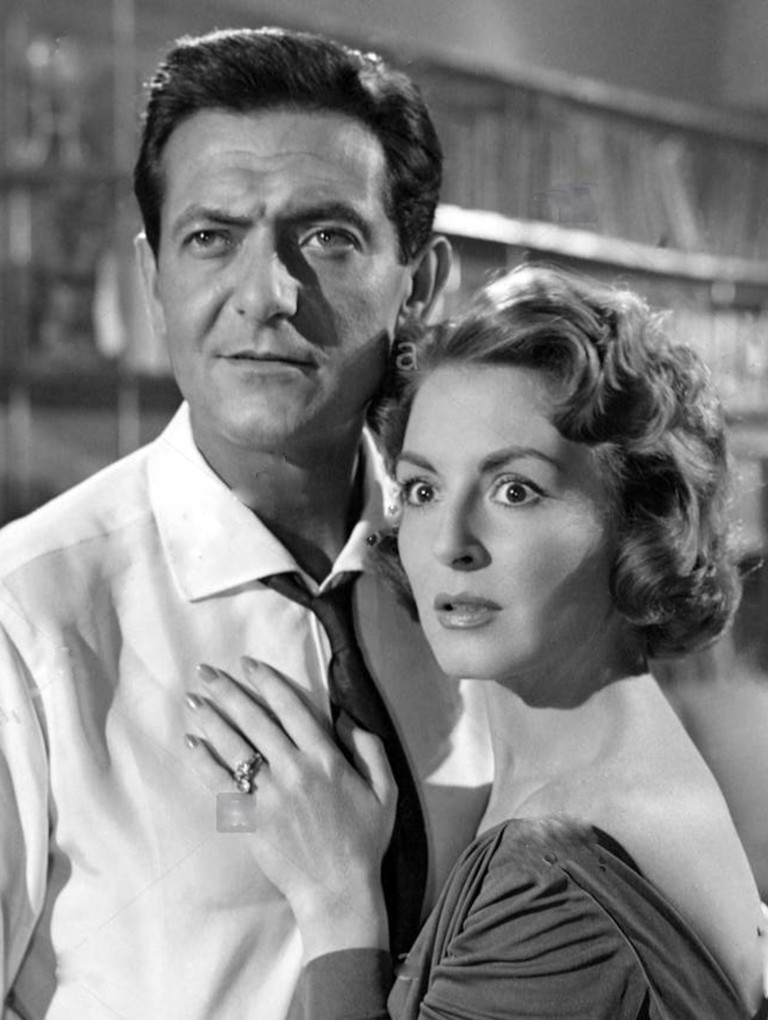
López with Alberto Closas in Navidades en junio (1960)

- The Disobedient Son (1945)
- The Three Garcias (1947)
- The Garcias Return (1947)
- Music Inside (1947)
- Marked Cards (1948)
- Salón México (1949)
- Midnight (1949)
- Love for Love (1950)
- Orange Blossom for Your Wedding (1950)
- Arrabalera (1951)
- Girls in Uniform (1951)
- A Place Near Heaven (1952)
- My Wife and the Other One (1952)
- The Lie (1952)
- Now I Am Rich (1952)
- A Divorce (1953)
- My Darling Clementine (1953)
- Los gavilanes (The Sparrowhawks) (1954)
- La tercera palabra (The Third Word) (1955)
- De carne somos (1955)
- After the Storm (1955)
- Del brazo y por la calle (Arm in Arm Down the Street) (1956)
- Nazarín (1958)
- Alfonso XII and María Cristina (1960)
- My Mother Is Guilty (1960)
- Peaches in Syrup (1960)
- Hasta el viento tiene miedo (1968)
- El libro de piedra (1969)
