= Ramón Gay =

Mexican actor

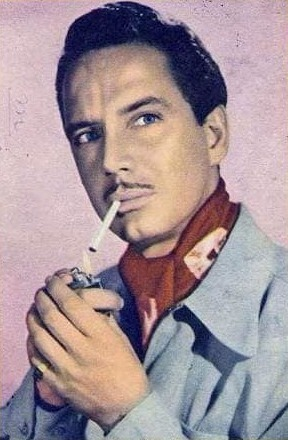
- Gay, c. 1956
- Born: Ramón García Gay; November 28, 1917; Mexico City, Distrito Federal, Mexico
- Died: May 28, 1960 (aged 42); Mexico City, Distrito Federal, Mexico
- Other name: Ramón García Gay
- Occupation: Actor
- Years active: 1946-1960

Ramón Gay (born Ramón García Gay; November 28, 1917 – May 28, 1960) was a Mexican film actor. He was one of the stars of the Golden Age of Mexican cinema, known to horror film fans for his role in The Aztec Mummy trilogy of films in the late 1950s.

He was killed in 1960, when he was shot dead during a dispute with another man over the actress, Evangelina Elizondo (1929–2017).

== Selected filmography ==
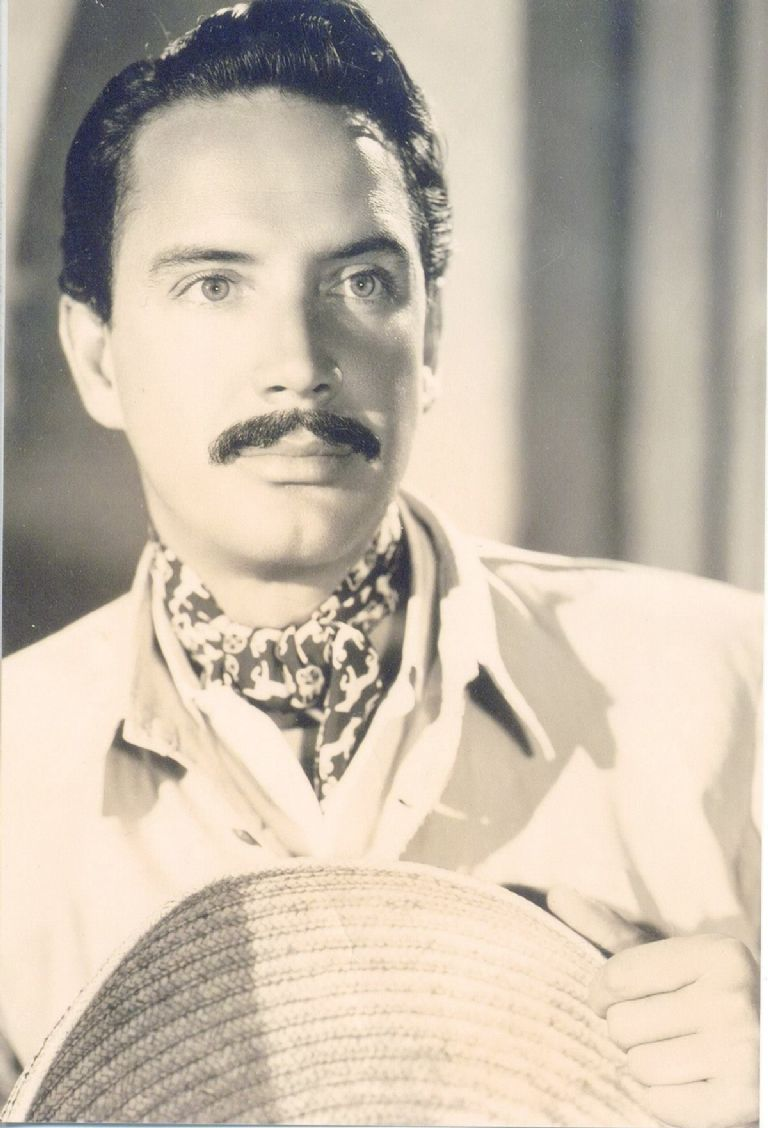
Gay, c. 1940s

- Five Faces of Woman (1947)
- Hypocrite (1949)
- Lola Casanova (1949)
- Tender Pumpkins (1949)
- Philip of Jesus (1949)
- Midnight (1949)
- Black Angustias (1950)
- Women Without Tomorrow (1951)
- Love Was Her Sin (1951)
- Among Lawyers I See You (1951)
- My Wife Is Not Mine (1951)
- In the Palm of Your Hand (1951)
- Angélica (1952)
- Paco the Elegant (1952)
- My Wife and the Other One (1952)
- The Night Is Ours (1952)
- Cinnamon Skin (1953)
- The Ghost Falls In Love (1953)
- La Bruja (1954)
- Camelia (1954)
- The Three Elenas (1954)
- After the Storm (1955)
- The Aztec Mummy (1957)
- The Curse of the Aztec Mummy (1957)
- The Robot vs. The Aztec Mummy (1958)
- Face of the Screaming Werewolf (1965)

== Bibliography ==
- Doyle Greene. Mexploitation Cinema: A Critical History of Mexican Vampire, Wrestler, Ape-Man and Similar Films, 1957-1977. McFarland, 2005.
