= Julio Alejandro =

Spanish screenwriter (1906–1995)

- Born: 27 November 1906; Huesca, Aragón, Spain
- Died: 22 September 1995 (aged 88); Javea, Valencia, Spain
- Occupation: Screenwriter
- Years active: 1951-1984

Julio Alejandro (27 November 1906 – 22 September 1995) was a Spanish screenwriter. He wrote for 80 films between 1951 and 1984, including the film Ash Wednesday, which was entered into the 8th Berlin International Film Festival.

== Selected filmography ==
- Women Without Tomorrow (1951)
- Sister Alegría (1952)
- When the Fog Lifts (1952)
- The Three Happy Friends (1952)
- Women Who Work (1953)
- Seven Women (1953)
- The Price of Living (1954)
- After the Storm (1955)
- De carne somos (1955)
- Ash Wednesday (1958)
- Nazarín (1959)
- My Mother Is Guilty (1960)
- Dangers of Youth (1960)
- Viridiana (1961)
- El tejedor de milagros (1962)
- Simon of the Desert (1965)
- Tristana (1970)
- The Garden of Aunt Isabel (1971)
