= Guillermo Calderón (producer) =

Mexican film producer

- Born: July 3, 1919; El Paso, Texas, United States
- Died: August 23, 2018 (aged 99); Mexico City, Mexico
- Other name: Guillermo Calderón Stell
- Occupation: Producer
- Years active: 1943–1994 (film)

Guillermo Calderón (1919–2018) was an American-born Mexican film producer. He began his career during the Golden Age of Mexican Cinema. His brother Pedro A. Calderón was also a producer. He married the actress Lyn May. He was sometimes credited as Guillermo Calderón Stell.

== Selected filmography ==
- Revenge (1948)
- Madam Temptation (1948)
- Coqueta (1949)
- Loyola, the Soldier Saint (1949)
- Lost (1950)
- My Wife Is Not Mine (1951)
- Sensuality (1951)
- The Lovers (1951)
- From the Can-Can to the Mambo (1951)
- Women of the Theatre (1951)
- I Don't Deny My Past (1952)
- Sacrificed Women (1952)
- The Night Is Ours (1952)
- Victims of Divorce (1952)
- Pompey the Conqueror (1953)
- The Sin of Being a Woman (1955)
- Dangers of Youth (1960)
- Invincible Guns (1960)
- The Curse of the Doll People (1961)
- Carnival Nights (1978)
- Midnight Dolls (1979)
- The Pulque Tavern (1981)

== Bibliography ==
- Agrasánchez, Rogelio. Guillermo Calles: A Biography of the Actor and Mexican Cinema Pioneer. McFarland, 2010.
- Mora, Carl J. Mexican Cinema: Reflections of a Society, 1896-2004. McFarland, 2005.
