= List of Mexican films of 1966 =

A list of Mexican films released in Mexico in 1966 (chronologically ordered by release date):

== 1966 ==
Title	Director	Cast	Genre	Release date	Notes
La Valentina	Rogelio A. González	María Félix, Eulalio González	Drama	February 10	
El proceso de Cristo	Julio Bracho	Enrique Rocha, Germán Robles, Julián Soler, Wolf Ruvinskis, Maura Monti	History	March 10	
Martín Romero El Rápido	Jaime Salvador	Fernando Casanova, Armando Silvestre, María Duval, Ofelia Montesco	Western	April 22	
Cada quién su lucha	Gilberto Martínez Solares	Viruta, Capulina, María Duval, Baby Bell	Comedy	June 23	
Los cuatro Juanes	Miguel Zacarías	Luis Aguilar, Antonio Aguilar, Javier Solís, Narciso Busquets	Drama	July 7	
Juan Colorado	Miguel Zacarías	Antonio Aguilar, María Duval, Elsa Cárdenas, Flor Silvestre	Drama	August 18	
Sólo para tí	Ícaro Cisneros Rivera	Angélica María, Mauricio Garcés, Fernando Luján	Comedy	September 22	
Casa de mujeres	Julián Soler	Dolores del Río, Elsa Aguirre, Fernando Soler	Drama	September 30	
El ángel y yo	Gilberto Martínez Solares	Tin Tan, Ana Martín, Ramón Valdés	Comedy	November 24	
La cigüeña distraída	Emilio Gómez Muriel	Viruta, Capulina, Alma Delia Fuentes, María Duval, Emily Cranz, Rosa María Vázquez	Comedy	December 22	
Tiempo de morir	Arturo Ripstein	Marga López, Jorge Martínez de Hoyos			
Caña brava	Ramón Pereda	Javier Solís, María Antonieta Pons			
Alma grande	Chano Urueta	Manuel López Ochoa, Sonia Infante, David Reynoso, Jorge Russek			
Dos meseros majaderos	Gilberto Martínez Solares	Marco Antonio Campos, Gaspar Henaine			
El caballo bayo	René Cardona	Antonio Aguilar, Maricruz Olivier			
Fiebre de juventud	Alfonso Corona Blake	Enrique Guzmán, Begoña Palacios, Rosa María Vázquez, Fernando Luján			Co-production with Ecuador
Joselito vagabundo	Miguel Morayta	Sara García			
Juan Pistolas	René Cardona Jr.	Javier Solís, Eleazar García, Eva Norvind			
La batalla de los pasteles	Agustín P. Delgado	Marco Antonio Campos, Gaspar Henaine			
Los dos apóstoles		Luis Aguilar, Sara García			
Rage	Gilberto Gazcón	Glenn Ford, Stella Stevens, David Reynoso			Co-production with the United States
