= List of Mexican films of 1958 =

A list of the films produced in Mexico in 1958 (see 1958 in film):

== 1958 ==
Title	Director	Cast	Genre	Notes
1958
¿Adonde van nuestros hijos?	Benito Alazraki	Dolores del Río, Andrea Palma, Ana Bertha Lepe	Drama	
Cabaret trágico	Alfonso Corona Blake	Columba Domínguez, Kitty de Hoyos, Rosa Carmina	Drama	
El castillo de los monstruos	Julián Soler	Antonio Espino "Clavillazo", Evangelina Elizondo	Comedy	
Desnúdate, Lucrecia	Tulio Demicheli	Silvia Pinal, Gustavo Rojo		
Escuela de rateros	Rogelio A. González	Pedro Infante, Yolanda Varela, Rosita Arenas		
Las Mil y una Noches	Fernando Cortés	Tin Tan, María Antonieta Pons	Comedy	
Miercoles de Ceníza	Roberto Gavaldón	María Félix, Arturo de Córdova, Víctor Junco, Andrea Palma	Drama	Entered into the 8th Berlin International Film Festival
La odalisca No. 13	Fernando Cortés	Tin Tan, Viruta y Capulina, María Antonieta Pons, Lorena Velázquez, Donna Behar		
The Robot vs. The Aztec Mummy	Rafael Portillo	Ramón Gay, Rosita Arenas	Science fiction	
Se los chupó la bruja	Jaime Salvador	Viruta y Capulina, Sonia Furió		
La tijera de oro	Benito Alazraki	Tin Tan, Lilia Guízar, Leonor Llausás		
El último rebelde	Miguel Contreras Torres	Carlos Thompson, Ariadna Welter and Rodolfo Acosta	Western	
Una cita de amor	Emilio Fernández	Silvia Pinal, Carlos López Moctezuma	Romance	Entered into the 8th Berlin International Film Festival
A Few Drinks	Tulio Demicheli	Libertad Lamarque, Miguel Aceves Mejía, Raúl Ramírez		
A media luz los tres	Julián Soler	Arturo de Córdova, Lilia Prado, María Elena Marqués		
A sablazo limpio	Fernando Cortés	Marco Antonio Campos, Gaspar Henaine, Lucho Gatica, Carmela Rey		
El gran premio		Sara García, Irma Dorantes, Ángel Infante		
El hombre y el monstruo	Rafael Baledón	Enrique Rambal, Abel Salazar, Martha Roth, Ofelia Guilmáin	Horror	
Escuela para suegras	Gilberto Martínez Solares	Germán Valdés, Martha Mijares, Blanca de Castejón		
Golden Legs	Alejandro Galindo	Antonio Espino, Tere Velázquez, Marco de Carlo		
It Happened in Mexico	Ramón Pereda	María Antonieta Pons, Joaquín Cordero, Carmelita González		
Los legionarios	Agustín P. Delgado	María Antonieta Pons, Marco Antonio Campos, Gaspar Henaine		
Los muertos no hablan	Jaime Salvador	Antonio Aguilar, Flor Silvestre		
Muertos de miedo	Jaime Salvador	Kitty de Hoyos, Marco Antonio Campos, Gaspar Henaine		
Music and Money	Rafael Portillo	Tito Guízar, Luis Aguilar, Pedro Vargas		
Música de siempre				
Raffles	Alejandro Galindo	Rafael Bertrand, María Duval, Prudencia Grifell		
The Boxer	Gilberto Gazcón	Joaquín Cordero, Ariadna Welter, Arturo Martínez		
Trip to the Moon	Fernando Cortés	Kitty de Hoyos, Sergio Corona		
¡Paso a la juventud..!	Gilberto Martínez Solares	Germán Valdés, Ana Bertha Lepe, Óscar Pulido, Wolf Ruvinskis	Musical comedy	

== See also ==
- 1958 in Mexico
