= List of Mexican films of 1964 =

A list of the films produced in Mexico in 1964 (see 1964 in film):

== 1964 ==
Title	Director	Cast	Genre	Notes
1964
Amor y sexo (Safo '63)	Luis Alcoriza	María Félix, Julio Alemán		
El gallo de oro	Roberto Gavaldón	Ignacio López Tarso, Lucha Villa		
El padrecíto	Miguel M. Delgado	Cantinflas, Angelines Fernández, Ángel Garasa, Rosa María Vázquez, Rogelio Guerra, José Elías Moreno		
La edad de la violencia	Julián Soler	Fernando Soler, César Costa, Alberto Vázquez, Julio Alemán, Julissa, Patricia Conde, Óscar Madrigal, Manolo Muñoz		
Las luchadoras contra la momia	René Cardona	Lorena Velázquez, Elizabeth Campbell		
So Loved Our Fathers	Juan Bustillo Oro	Fernando Soler, Joaquín Cordero, Consuelo Frank	Comedy	
Viento negro	Servando González	José Elías Moreno, David Reynoso, Jorge Martínez de Hoyos		Selected as the Mexican entry for the Best Foreign Language Film at the 39th Academy Awards
Buenos días, Acapulco	Agustín P. Delgado	Marco Antonio Campos, Gaspar Henaine, René Cardona Jr.		
El revólver sangriento	Miguel M. Delgado	Luis Aguilar, Lola Beltrán, Flor Silvestre		
El rey del tomate	Miguel M. Delgado	Eulalio González, Luz Márquez, Emma Roldán		
Héroe a la fuerza	Miguel M. Delgado	Eulalio González, Rosa de Castilla, Sara García		
La edad de piedra	René Cardona	Marco Antonio Campos, Gaspar Henaine, Lorena Velázquez		
Las chivas rayadas		Sara García, Antonio Espino		
Los astronautas	Miguel Zacarías	Marco Antonio Campos, Gaspar Henaine, Gina Romand, Norma Mora		
Los fenómenos del futbol		Sara García		A sequel to Las chivas rayadas
Museo del horror	Rafael Baledón	Julio Alemán, Patricia Conde, Joaquín Cordero		
Nos dicen las intocables		Sara García		
Tres muchachas de Jalisco	Emilio Gómez Muriel	Elvira Quintana, Flor Silvestre, María Duval		
¡Buenas noches, año nuevo!	Julián Soler	Silvia Pinal, Ricardo Montalbán, Fanny Cano, Monna Bell		

== See also ==
- 1964 in Mexico
