= List of Mexican films of 1960 =

A list of films produced in Mexico in 1960 (see 1960 in film):

== 1960 ==
Title	Director	Cast	Genre	Notes
Cuando ¡Viva Villa..! es la muerte	Ismael Rodríguez	Pedro Armendáriz, Alma Rosa Aguirre		
Dos criados malcriados	Agustín P. Delgado	Viruta y Capulina, Tere Velázquez, Manolita Saval		
El Esqueleto de la señora Morales	Rogelio A. González	Arturo de Córdova, Amparo Rivelles, Angelines Fernández	Comedy	
La Estrella Vacia	Tito Davison	María Félix, Ignacio López Tarso, Enrique Rambal	Drama	
El fantasma de la opereta	Fernando Cortés			
La casa del terror	Gilberto Martínez Solares	Lon Chaney Jr., Tin Tan		
Infierno de almas	Benito Alazraki	Ramón Armengod, Sonia Furió, Christiane Martel, Tito Junco		
La sombra del caudillo	Julio Bracho			
La joven (The Young One)	Luis Buñuel	Zachary Scott, Bernie Hamilton		Entered into the 1960 Cannes Film Festival
El violetero	Gilberto Martínez Solares	Tin Tan, Marina Camacho, Renée Dumas		
Macario	Roberto Gavaldón	Ignacio López Tarso, Pina Pellicer		Entered into the 1960 Cannes Film Festival
Pancho Villa y la Valentina	Ismael Rodriguez	Pedro Armendáriz, Elsa Aguirre		
Ship of the Monsters	Rogelio A. González	Eulalio González "El Piporro", Ana Bertha Lepe, Lorena Velázquez		
Tin Tan y las modelos	Benito Alazraki	Tin Tan, Lorena Velázquez		
Cada quién su vida	Julio Bracho	Ana Luisa Peluffo, Emma Fink		
Los desenfrenados	Agustín P. Delgado	Viruta y Capulina, Dacia González, Aida Araceli, María Eugenia San Martín, Madga Urvizu, Gina Romand		
Los tigres del desierto	Agustín P. Delgado	Viruta y Capulina, Lorena Velázquez, Donna Behar		
Adventures of Joselito and Tom Thumb	René Cardona	Joselito, Cesáreo Quezadas, Enrique Rambal	Musical	
Black Skull	Joselito Rodríguez	Luis Aguilar, Dagoberto Rodríguez, Pascual García Peña	Western	
Chucho el Roto	Manuel Muñoz	Carlos Baena, Adriana Roel, Óscar Pulido		
Comedians and Songs	Fernando Cortés	Marco Antonio Campos, Gaspar Henaine, Silvia Fournier		
Creo en ti	Alfonso Corona Blake			
Dangers of Youth	Benito Alazraki	Elvira Quintana, Tere Velázquez, Fernando Luján		
Dos hijos desobedientes	Jaime Salvador	Pedro Armendáriz, Antonio Aguilar, Elvira Quintana, María Duval		
Dos locos en escena	Agustín P. Delgado	Marco Antonio Campos, Gaspar Henaine, Flor Silvestre		
El dolor de pagar la renta	Agustín P. Delgado	Marco Antonio Campos, Gaspar Henaine, Cesáreo Quezadas		
El espejo de la bruja	Chano Urueta	Rosita Arenas, Isabela Corona, Dina de Marco		
His First Love	Juan José Ortega	Rafael Bertrand, Tere Velázquez, Freddy Fernández		
Invincible Guns	Benito Alazraki	Elvira Quintana, Armando Silvestre, Roberto G. Rivera		
La Llorona	René Cardona	María Elena Marqués, Mauricio Garcés, Eduardo Fajardo, Luz María Aguilar		
La potranca	Román Viñoly Barreto	Mario Lozano, Maruja Montes		
Los fanfarrones	Rogelio A. González	Miguel Aceves Mejía, Flor Silvestre, Julio Aldama, Mauricio Garcés, Irma Dorantes, Verónica Loyo		
Love in the Shadows	Tito Davison	Libertad Lamarque, Yolanda Varela, Enrique Rambal		
My Mother Is Guilty	Julián Soler	Marga López, Carlos Baena, Domingo Soler		
Northern Courier	Zacarías Gómez Urquiza	Luis Aguilar, Rosa de Castilla		
Rebel Without a House	Benito Alazraki	Germán Valdés, Ana Bertha Lepe		
The Miracle Roses	Julián Soler	Armando Silvestre, Crox Alvarado, Jaime Fernández		
The White Renegade	Fernando Méndez	Mauricio Garcés, Abel Salazar, Rafael Baledón		
The White Sister	Tito Davison	Jorge Mistral, Yolanda Varela, Prudencia Grifell		
Three Black Angels	Fernando Cortés	Miguel Aceves Mejía, Yolanda Varela, Pedro Vargas		
Two Cheap Husbands	Jaime Salvador	Lilia Prado, Demetrio González, Julio Aldama		

== See also ==
- 1960 in film
- 1960 in Mexico
