= List of Mexican films of 1967 =

A list of the films produced in Mexico in 1967 (see 1967 in film):

== 1967 ==
Title	Director	Cast	Genre	Notes
1967
Juego de mentiras	Archibaldo Burns			
Pedro Páramo	Carlos Velo	John Gavin, Ignacio López Tarso, Beatriz Sheridan		Entered into the 1967 Cannes Film Festival
Dos pintores pintorescos	René Cardona Jr.	Viruta y Capulina, Regina Torné, Gilda Mirós		Last Viruta y Capulina film together.
Su Excelencia	Miguel M. Delgado	Cantinflas, Sonia Infante, Guillermo Zetina, Tito Junco, Víctor Alcocer, Maura Monti, José Gálvez, Miguel Manzano		
Un dorado de Pancho Villa	Emilio Fernández	Emilio Fernández, Maricruz Olivier		Entered into the 5th Moscow International Film Festival
Las mujeres panteras	René Cardona	Tongolele, Elizabeth Campbell, Ariadne Welter		
Como pescar marído	Alfredo B. Crevenna	Maricruz Olivier, Fanny Cano		
Chanoc	Rogelio A. González	Andres García, Tin Tan, Barbara Angely		
El matrimonio es como el demonio	René Cardona Jr.	Mauricio Garcés, Elsa Aguirre		
La muerte en bikini	Arturo Martínez	Rodolfo de Anda, Eric del Castillo, Tito Junco, Maura Monti		
S.O.S. Conspiración Bikini	René Cardona Jr.	Julio Alemán, Sonia Furió, Sonia Infante, Maura Monti, Noé Murayama, Roberto Cañedo		
El hermano Pedro	Miguel Contreras Torres	Sonia Furió, Pruden Castellanos		Co-production with Guatemala, last Miguel Contreras Torres film.
Blue Demon contra las diabólicas	Chano Urueta	David Reynoso, Ana Martín, Blue Demon		
Detectives o ladrones..?	Miguel Morayta	Marco Antonio Campos, Gaspar Henaine		
El asesino se embarca	Miguel M. Delgado	Enrique Lizalde, Regina Torné, Armando Silvestre		
Juego peligroso	Luis Alcoriza	Silvia Pinal, Julissa, Milton Rodríguez		
Las amiguitas de los ricos		Sara García		
Los alegres Aguilares		Antonio Aguilar		
Qué hombre tan sin embargo	Julián Soler	Eulalio González "Piporro", Julissa, Enrique Rambal, Lucy Gallardo		
Seis días para morir		Sara García		
The Bandits	Robert Conrad, Alfredo Zacarías	Robert Conrad		
The Empire of Dracula	Federico Curiel	Lucha Villa, César del Campo, Eric del Castillo		
The Partisan of Villa	Miguel Morayta	Carmen Sevilla, Julio Alemán, Vicente Parra		
Traitors of San Angel	Leopoldo Torre Nilsson	Ian Hendry, Lautaro Murúa, Graciela Borges		
Un novio para dos hermanas	Luis César Amadori	Pili & Mili		
Un par de robachicos	René Cardona Jr.	Marco Antonio Campos, Gaspar Henaine, Ofelia Montesco		
