= List of Mexican films of the 1960s =

A list of films produced in the Cinema of Mexico in the 1960s, ordered by year of release. For an alphabetical list of articles on Mexican films see Category:Mexican films.

== 1960 ==
- List of Mexican films of 1960

== 1961 ==
- List of Mexican films of 1961

== 1962 ==
- List of Mexican films of 1962

== 1963 ==
- List of Mexican films of 1963

== 1964 ==
- List of Mexican films of 1964

== 1965 ==
- List of Mexican films of 1965

== 1966 ==
- List of Mexican films of 1966

== 1967 ==
- List of Mexican films of 1967

== 1968 ==
- List of Mexican films of 1968

== 1969 ==
- List of Mexican films of 1969
