= Comedy in the Golden Age of Mexican Cinema =

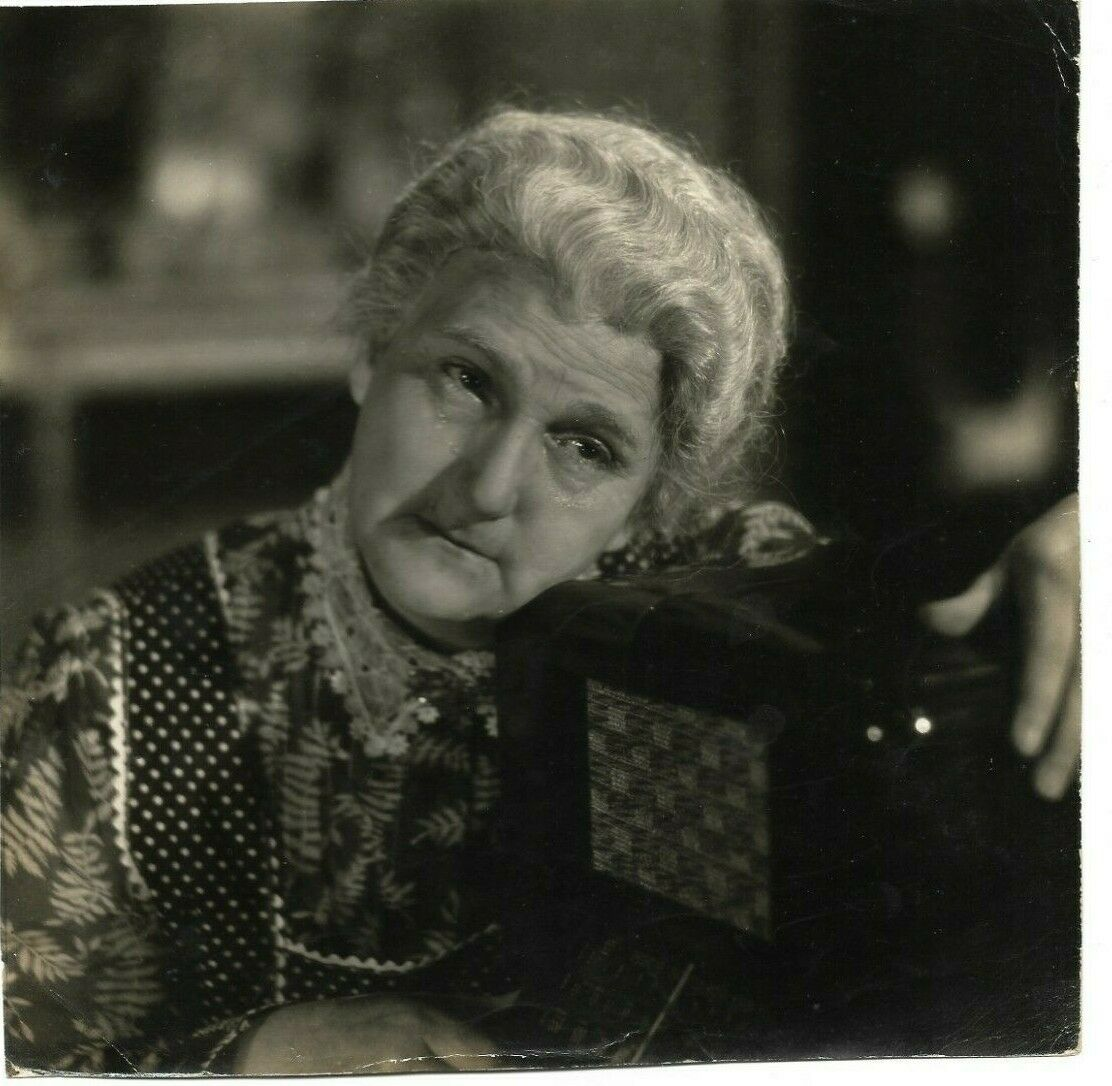
Sara Garcia

Comedy in the Golden Age of Mexican Cinema is a Mexican era of film popular during "El Porfiriato" which represents the reign of Porfirio Díaz as a dictator in Mexico.

== History ==
Film became popular and well known in Mexico during "El Porfiriato", which represents the reign of Porfirio Díaz as dictator in Mexico. On August 6, 1896, the first films began to be released and were called/known as "Vistas". In other words, views. At the time, the Catholic Church and the press were strongly opposed to the "vistas" because of the violence and women that was portrayed. They protested against them. Another important aspect was the projection of the Mexican Revolution to the public through film. It was a way for many to understand what was happening politically.

Many agree that rather than the Mexican Revolution being a repression for the film industry, it was more of a motivator in the way it portrayed every battle and struggle. With the positive energy that the Mexico's film industries was receiving, it began to evolve into "El Cine Sonoro", which translates to the cinema of sound. This was the era in which sound was being added into the silent films. It was not as successful as many directors and film maker though it would be. Many failed to correctly synchronize the audio with the picture.

Although to some extent it may have been unsuccessful, it is agreeable that it helped revolutionize film in Latin America. Mexico's film industry takes its height post "El Cine Sonoro" to what is known as "The Golden Age". Many film members consider this one of the most successful eras in the history of Mexican cinema. Many recognize the films of this era when they see black and white. The films also portrayed social issues. Some of the most influential directors and actors are Emilio Fernández, Raul De Anda, Roberto B. Cervenna, Cantinflas, Vitola, Tin Tan, etc.

== The evolution of comedy in Mexican cinema ==
=== Silent films ===
The first films presented in Mexico were possible through the agents of the Lumiére brothers (the earliest filmmakers in the history of cinema) and through the progressivists of Porfirio's regime. These progressivists included wealthy businessmen who had a vision of a modern Mexico and so they bought films, camera equipment and accessories for production for pioneers in the metropolitan regions of Mexico. Pioneers that stood out with their filmmaking were Salvador Toscano, Enrique Rosas y Carlos Mongrand. Their moving pictures included Porfirios family activities, festivals, but also other pieces including argumental works.

Given that Pathé (a famous film production at the time), did not build any studios in Mexico like it did in other countries and business people took advantage of this to run production at a national level. In the early 1900s cinematography had a prominent presence in Mexico City and by 1910 "the mayor part of production, exhibition and distribution of movies was in the hands of the nation Mexico" (King 1990).

Silent films in general were popularized by specifically toward comedy by legendary actors such as Charlie Chaplin and the Marx brothers in the United States. In fact, Chaplin has become the staple for the image of comedy in film and he was able not only to bring comedy to life on film but to raise awareness on social issues such as poverty. Easy Street (1917) and The Kid (1921) are examples which depict the social issues of violence as well as poverty within comedy films.

Similarly, legendary Mexican comedians such as Cantinflas have used this same approach during the Cine de Oro. When it comes to the quantity of films in comparison to other countries, silent films there are few films that were made and thus fewer that were preserved but some of the most famous ones include El autómovil gris (The gray automobile) (1919), as well as Tepeyac (1917), a film about Juan Diego and the appearance of the Virgin of Guadalupe. Other classics include El tren fantasma (The Ghost Train) (1927) and El puño de hierro (The Iron Fist) (1927).

=== Comedy in silent films ===
Comedy in Mexican silent films were a bit more rare than in the United States and some of the reasons could both by the pressures of the church as well as the Porfiriato regime. They did indeed exist, however, such as El Rosario de Amozoc and Don Juan Tenorio directed by Enrique Rosas. Others are Al Sr. Bermudez no le gustan los agentes and El Sr. Durand quiere irse de Juerga directed by Salvador Toscano in 1909. It is important to add that on March 22, 1982, a nitrate fire broke out in Mexico's film archive located in the Cinetica Nacional in Mexico City, which "destroyed 6,506 films along with 3,300 Mexican features and short subjects (a substantial portion of Mexican film history)".

== The Golden Era of Mexican Cinema (1930s-50s) ==
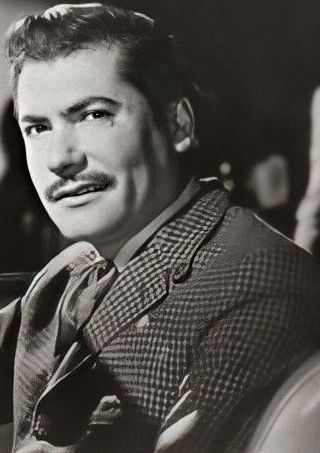
Eulalio González "Piporro".

In the 1930s, film makers began expanding their ideas on film/cinematography and the "Epoca De Oro" was born. Epoca De Oro is well known throughout Latin America as one of the dominant eras of film history. Many black and white movies such as Vamonos con Pancho Villa (1935) and Alla En El Rancho Grande (1936) excelled in the box office and became classics instantly. Many actors flourished and started their careers during this era including: Rodolfo Acosta, Antonio Aguilar, Pedro Infante, Lupe Vélez, María Félix, Gloria Marín. Most importantly, comedy began to take a big role in "El Cine De Oro".

Classic films like El Circo (1942) and Escuela Para Suegras (1958) brought many comedic actors to the light. Many well known comedian actor like Cantinflas and Tin Tan (German Valdes) forever influenced comedy in "El Cine De Oro" era. These two actors were known as two of the leading men in comedy. Many of the comedic films take place in middle-class neighborhoods as well as lower-class neighborhoods also known as "Barrios". They give a certain attracting twist to social situations and project them to the public and help everyone understand issues between classes. "El Cine De Oro" also consisted of other genres such as romance, drama, action, comedy etc. The importance of el cine is the fact that it was the time in which Mexico's film industry dominated other countries and many great actors and directors were born from this.

The Golden Era of Cinema was a time of boom in the movie industry in Mexico and it marks not only the thrive of Mexican romance and melodrama but comedy as well. Pedro Infante, Jorge Negrete, María Félix and Luis Aguilar, to name a few, were icons that came out in many hit films and most of their films involved a trace of comedy by either their character and/or supporting actors and actresses for comical relief; their main emphasis, however, was on melodrama and romance genres. While filmmakers were working toward creating films that would appeal to a "broad section of society" including both "urban middle-class as well as a growing working-class consumers" they were also competing with the "technical advantages of Hollywood" (Pilcher 2010). The Mexican movie industry sought not only to make as much profit as possible in their country but also to compete in the foreign market which resulted in the production of "folkloric stereotypes such as the singing charros and china poblanas of Allá en el Rancho Grande" film which was one of the major hits during this era (Pilcher 2010). Nevertheless, these films as whole worked to establish a national identity for the people of Mexico.

== Cantinflas Cantinfleando ==
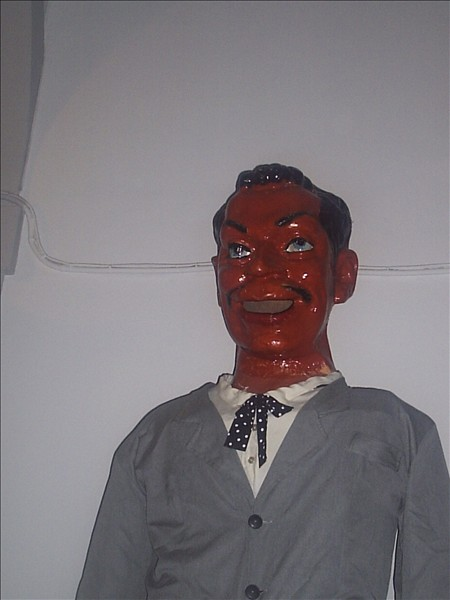
Cantinflas

The breakthrough for Mexican comedy came with Mario Moreno, more popularly known as Cantinflas. Moreno offered a type of film that was different from these commercial films and an "escape" to "a new form of urban comedy" (Pilcher, 2010). Even so, the folkloric depictions became a profitable formula for film-making as it not only attracted a foreign audience but it celebrated a national pride and identity. What is also celebrated is the profitable agenda of an alternative style which came to be known as El Cine de Cantinflas (Galero 2009) creating almost a genre of its own with the trademark of cantinfleo (also known as cantinfleando) (a term that has been legitimized as a term to depict the act of talking rapidly). It is safe to say that Cantinflas is to Mexico what Charlie Chaplin is to the United States.

Cantinflas began his career in street theater before he made it to the movie industry. In fact, there was some controversy and some claimed that Moreno had used skits, characters, costumes, and skits by less successful carpa performers in the theater for his movies (Pilcher 2010). Whether he did imitate or use characters that of carpa actors in theater is up for interpretation, however, what he did do is bring this style of comedy into the movie industry on a large scale and paved the way for actors in the comedy genre in Mexico. In his early films, Cantinflas portrayed a character which represented the poorer and more common people of Mexico. He is visible in movies like Ahí está el detalle (There's the Detail) (1940) dressed "in drooping pants held up by a rope and a small hat in place of a broad sombrero to leave the shoulders free for carrying loads" (Pilcher 2012).

This comedy film was a hit throughout Latin America but Hollywood was more reluctant to embrace the character of pelado (characterization that includes sexually suggestive language, bravado and wit) from Cantinflas (Pilcher 357). Nevertheless, he rose to fame which allowed him to explore other styles while maintaining his cantinfleando signature in all his films. Successful films that maintained the image of the pelado were El Bolero De Raquel (1957), El Extra (1962) and El Señor Fotógrafo (1953), all in color, to name a few. Films that deviated from the pelado image and experimented with different characterizations include El Profe (The Teacher) (1971), El Padrecito (The Priest) (1964), El Señor Doctor (The Doctor) (1965), and El Analfabeto (The Illiterate One) (1961). It seems that Moreno could not shake his theater ways for his is known for upsetting producers and actors as well as actresses alike in the way he sometimes improvised on the set (Pilcher 2010).

== Tin Tan the Pachuco ==
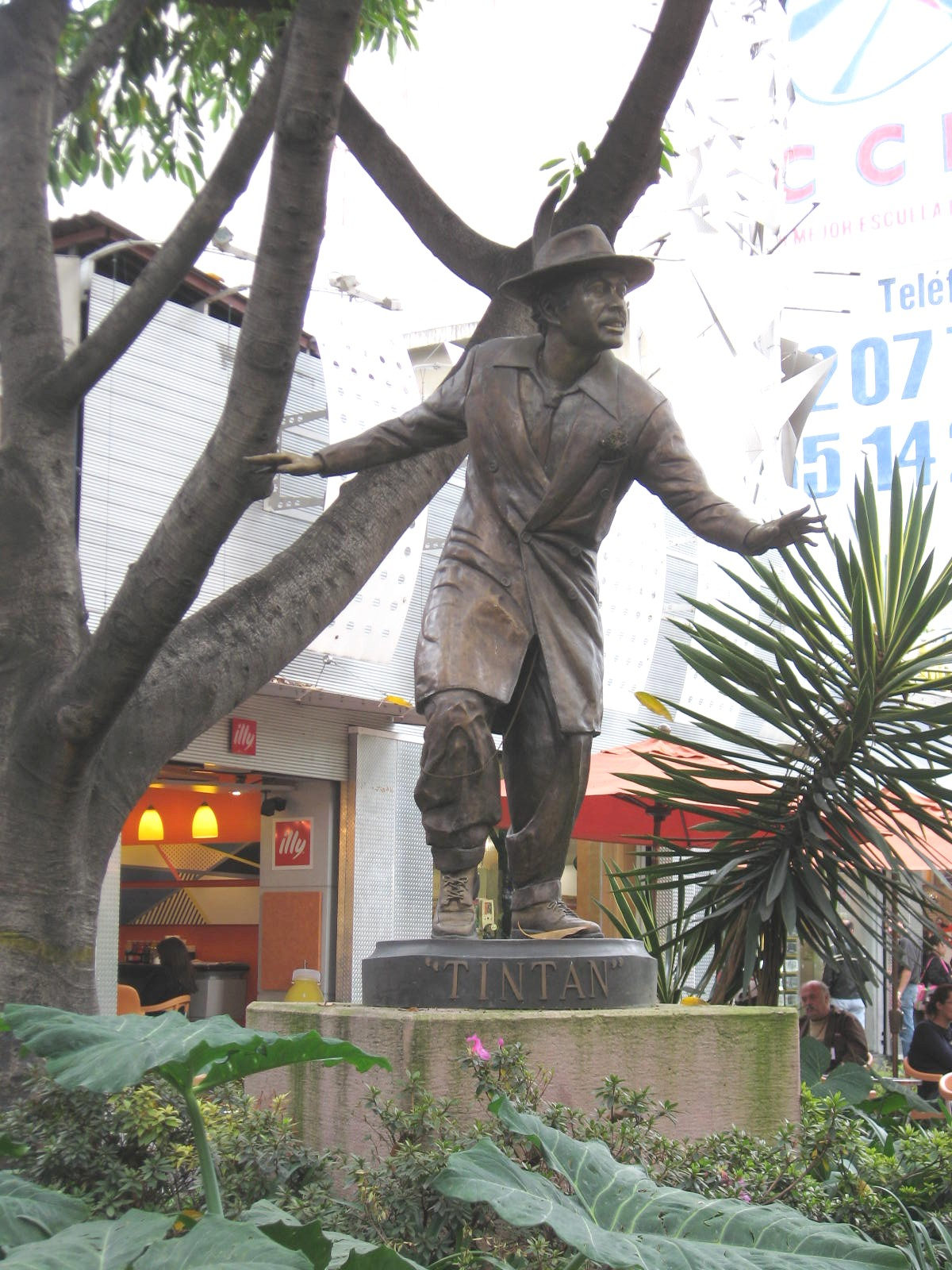
Tin Tan

Germán Valdés, or "Tin Tan", is also known as the pachuco for his numerous roles portraying this very image of a hip, modern and even transborder male. In fact, he was criticized for embracing the stereotype of the pachuco while others applauded the modernity of his comedy. The image of the pachuco is portrayed by Carlos Monsivais's, as explained by Javier Durán, "as a crucial cultural axis from which to examine issues related to Mexican identity and nationhood".

The zoot suit riots and the mistreatment as well as discrimination toward Latinos by the Los Angeles Police Department have left a stain and this is one reason why the image has become so iconic. Furthermore, the pachuco is "constantly translating cultural, linguistic, and economic realities" in both the United States and Mexico and hence a representation of a "transbordered subject". In many of Tin Tan's movies he embraces the zoot suit as it becomes innate to his character such as El Rey Del Barrio (The King of the Neighborhood), El Hijo Desobediente (The Disobedient Child), and Músico, Poeta y Loco (Musician, Poet and Madman).

According to Durán, Tin Tan was not a great humorist when it came to verbal speech, but he knew how to impersonate and mimic with affinity as well as caricature. His character of the pachuco always portrayed to have a "flare" for chaos and a lack of respect for the authorities as well as for formalities. With the popularity of his films the term pachuquismo was developed (43). This did not last, however, and this resulted in the post-pachuquista characters in Tin Tan's films which includes the pelado with an emphasis on the urban peasant. Films which lean toward a post-pachuquista are El Mariachi Desconocido and Fuerte Audaz Y Valiente (similar to that of a western). Both Cantinflas and Tin Tan utilized cross dressing to portray comedy in their films. In a rare collaboration, the film Viaje a la Luna (1957) joined popular comedians of the time including Tin Tan, Viruta y Capulina and memorable supporting actress Vitola and actor Chabelo (who also worked with Cantinflas in El Extra).

== Clavillazo "No me vuelvan hacer eso" ==
Antonio Espino y Mora, also known as Clavillazo, is one of the leading comedic men of the golden age and he is noted for making the phrase "No me vuelvan hacer eso" ("Don't ever do that again") famous. He was born in Puebla, Mexico on August 13, 1910. His acting comedic career began in 1943 when he moved to live in Mexico City. One of his first gigs was a part in "El Teatro De Carpa" which can translate as a U.S. version of Ringling brothers but in a theater context. The purpose of the "Teatro De Carpa" was to be mobil and tour different cities and perform. With the love he received in the shows, he decided later to open his own touring show called "Teziutlán" after his hometown in Mexico. The first leading Espino landed was in a 1950 film named "Monte De Piedad".

After that, his future roles were mainly leading man which helped him become well known all over Latin America. One of the Mexican television stations (TV Azteca) presented a tribute to him for his 100th anniversary. Clavillazo, similar to Tin Tan, is known for his caricature expressions and for his physical comedy. He usually depicted roles that portrayed a poor man that is saved by his wit and struck of good luck. In 1963 a film called Los Fantasmas Burlones featured Tin Tan, Clavillazo and Resortes.

== Double Acts ==
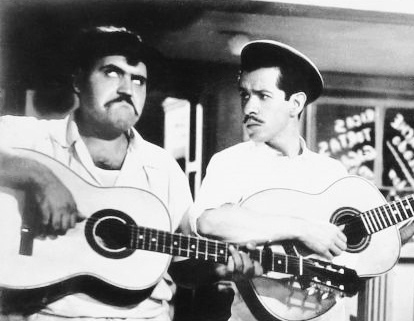
Capulina (left) and Viruta (right) in La Sombra del Otro.

Viruta (Marco Antonio Campos) and Capulina (Gaspar Henaine Pérez) debuted many films in which they sang, danced and worked as a team. Viruta was the "smart one" and Capulina was the "silly trickster". Some of their films include El Dolor de Pagar la Renta and El Peligro de La Muerte.
