= Televisa San Ángel =

Coordinates: 19°20′42″N 99°12′11″W

- Interactive map of the Televisa San Ángel area

General information
- Type: Studio
- Location: Blvd. Adolfo López Mateos No. 2551 Col. Lomas de San Ángel Inn Delegación Álvaro Obregón C.P. 01790, Mexico City, Mexico
- Opening: 1948
- Owner: TelevisaUnivision

Televisa San Ángel (originally Estudios y Laboratorios San Ángel, S.A.) is a film and television studio located in Mexico City. It was originally built by Jorge Stahl as a motion picture studio, and in the 1970s would be sold to the Azcárraga family, which, through ownership of the Televisa networks, continues to own the studios. It is the headquarters facility of the Centro de Educación Artística (CEA) and the Videocine (formerly Televicine) motion picture production and distribution company. The network's Centro de Post Produccion is also housed at San Ángel. Moreover, it is best known as a motion picture and television studio. It is the oldest movie and television production facility in Mexico and the most famous telenovela studio facility in Latin America. It was one of the four main Mexican film studios along with Estudios Churubusco, Estudios América, and Estudios Tepeyac.

== History ==
Televisa San Ángel is one of two surviving motion picture studios in Mexico. The other, Estudios Churubusco Azteca, had been cofounded by, ironically, Televisa San Ángel's current owners. The studio had been built by Jorge Stahl as a production facility; the earliest Mexican movie to credited with being filmed at San Ángel is es:Mi campeón, released in 1952. At least 60 different motion pictures would be produced at the studio until 1969. In 1968, a new network, Television Independiente de Mexico (TIM) was launched from the San Ángel studios. Ownership of the studios was passed onto the Azcarraga family when TIM and Telesistema Mexicano merged to become Televisa in 1973; under Televisa's watch, the studio became a leading production facility in Mexico. In 1979, Televisa's Televicine (now Videocine) motion picture unit was established; at the same time the network's Centro de Educación Artística was set up at the studio.

Mexico's first electronic character generator was installed at Televisa San Ángel in 1980; it would be replaced in 1987 by a Chyron machine. When the 1985 Mexico City earthquake struck down Televisa's Chapultepec studios, two programs that had originated there, En familia con Chabelo and Siempre en Domingo, moved production permanently to Televisa San Ángel. Many Televisa contract players who had worked at Chapultepec began to work at San Ángel at this time. Several of them have worked at the studios in both the pre-Televisa and modern eras of the facility.

The 1986 FIFA World Cup draw was held at Televisa San Ángel on 15 of December 1985.

== The Facility ==
Televisa San Ángel is divided into 16 sound stages known as "Foros". As of 2013, all of them had converted into high definition. Each sound stage measures 900 square meters (9,687 square feet). The Centro de Post Produccion is the most advanced post-production facility of its kind in the world, and contains 10 editing stations. There is a wide assortment of microphones at San Ángel, including lavalier, boom, handheld and headset microphones, most of them wireless. Most telenovelas produced at the studio use boom and lavalier microphones. An average of 15 telenovelas and several other television series, not to mention a handful of theatrical movie releases are produced at San Ángel every year. Each studio contains three cameras and a laptop computer. Televisa San Ángel also contains five audio recording studios and three mixing suites.

Thirty different producers who have been with Televisa for years have offices at San Ángel. These include Andre Barren Díaz, Pedro Damián, Guillermo del Bosque, Luis de Llano Macedo, Carla Estrada, Emilio Larrosa, Chabelo, Rosy Ocampo, Jorge Ortiz de Pinedo, Juan Osorio, Angelí Nesma Medina, Nicandro Díaz González, Salvador Mejía Alexandre, Carmen Amendáriz, and Enrique Segoviano.

Televisa San Ángel's main entrance plaza, Plaza Televisa, is dedicated to the producers, directors, actors and other personnel who have been with Televisa, off and on, for at least 30 years total. Plaques at Plaza Televisa honor many of these personnel. Most of the honored personnel are famous, including many actors as well as some of the aforementioned producers.

== Films shot at Estudios San Ángel (selected) ==
- Se los chupó la bruja (1958), starring Viruta y Capulina
- A sablazo limpio (1958), starring Viruta y Capulina
- La Valentina (1966), starring María Félix and Lalo González "Piporro"
- Cómplices Al Rescate (2002) starring Belinda and Daniela Luján
