= La sombra del otro (film) =

- Directed by: Gilberto Martínez Solares
- Written by: María Luisa Algarra (dialogue), Francisco Javier Camargo (radio series)
- Produced by: Fernando de Fuentes, Vicente Saisó Piquer
- Starring: Marco Antonio Campos "Viruta", Gaspar Henaine "Capulina", Ricardo "Pajarito" Moreno, Ana Bertha Lepe, Teresa Velázquez, Sonia Furió
- Cinematography: José Ortiz Ramos
- Edited by: Pedro Velázquez
- Music by: Luis Hernández Bretón
- Release date: 13 November 1957
- Running time: 80 minutes
- Country: Mexico
- Language: Spanish

La sombra del otro ("The Shadow of the Other") is a 1957 Mexican sports comedy-drama film directed by Gilberto Martínez Solares and starring Viruta and Capulina, Ana Bertha Lepe, Teresa Velázquez and Sonia Furió. This film presents the debut of the comedians actors Marco Antonio Campos and Gaspar Henaine (as the duous Viruta and Capulina), and the actress, singer, dancer, model and presenter Tere Velázquez. It also features of which there is a special participation of the boxer Ricardo "Pajarito" Moreno.

This film focuses on two cafeteria owners who are viewed as living talismans by a boxer who they assist in his training sessions.

== Plot ==
Viruta and Capulina are owners of a cafeteria and combine this business with that of assistants to an incipient boxer called Ricardo, whom they accompany in his hard training sessions, as he considers them his good luck talismans.

Later, they meet two women, Celicia (Ana Bertha Lepe) and Alejandra (Tere Velázquez).

== Cast ==
- Marco Antonio Campos as Viruta
- Gaspar Henaine as Capulina
- Ricardo "Pajarito" Moreno as Ricardo
- Ana Bertha Lepe as Cecilia
- Freddy Fernández
- Víctor Gómez
- Teresa Velázquez as Alejandra
- Luis Aragón as don Blas García
- Velia Vegar as Doña Catita
- José Castro
- Enrique García Álvarez as Boss Guillermo
- Julio Sotelo
- Nicolás Morán 'El Chintololo'
- Nico 'El Chintololo' (as Nicolas Moran)
- Tomás Castillo
- Ernesto Parra
- Raúl Torres 'El Fufurufo'
- Kildo Martínez
- Rudy Coronado
- Beto Carbajal
- Baby Rivera as El Bay López
- Lino Botello
- Jaime Magallon
- Sonia Furió as Singer
- Trío Avileño
- Ricardo Adalid (uncredited)
- Arturo Castro «Bigotón» as Mensajero de Jhonson (uncredited)
- Leonor Gómez (uncredited)
- Pedro Mago Septien as Storyteller (uncredited)
- Guillermo Álvarez Bianchi as Coach el Fufurufo (uncredited)

== Reception ==
The film is considered a boxing film and is remembered for the presence of Moreno in the cast.
