= Cada quién su lucha =

- Theatrical poster
- Directed by: Gilberto Martínez Solares
- Screenplay by: Roberto Gómez Bolaños
- Story by: Alfredo Zacarías
- Produced by: Alfredo Zacarías
- Starring: Marco Antonio Campos; Gaspar Henaine; María Duval; Baby Bell
- Cinematography: Agustín Jiménez
- Edited by: Gloria Schoemann
- Music by: Raúl Lavista
- Production company: Estudios Churubusco
- Distributed by: Producciones Zacarías
- Release date: June 23, 1966 (Mexico)
- Running time: 90 minutes
- Country: Mexico
- Language: Spanish

Cada quién su lucha is a 1966 Mexican comedy film written by Roberto Gómez Bolaños, directed by Gilberto Martínez Solares and starring Viruta y Capulina, María Duval and Baby Bell. This film is the first parte of a trilogy of films based in wrestling, including Santo contra Capulina (1968) y El investigador Capulina (1975). This is the only film in which Duval and Bell play Lucha García and Lucha Morales, and sing music themes on scene.

== Cast ==
- Marco Antonio Campos as Viruta
- Gaspar Henaine as Capulina
- María Duval as Lucha García
- Baby Bell as Lucha Morales
- Carlos Agostí as Badín Anuar
- Eduardo Silvestre as Gerardo
- Consuelo Monteagudo as Badín's Client
- Leo Acosta as The Drummer
- Nathanael León as Julián Caireles
- Mario García "Harapos" as Badín's Henchman
- Carlos Ruffino as Badín's Henchman
- Julián de Meriche as Candy Factory Owner
- Gloria Chávez as Young Lady at Party
- Ramón Valdés as Badín's Henchman
- Carlos Bravo y Fernández as Badín's Client

== Production ==
Filming began on June 16, 1965 in Estudios Churubusco and in various locations of Mexico City, such as the intersection of Insurgentes and Félix Cuevas.

== Reception ==
The film premiered on June 23, 1966 in Cine Alameda for two weeks.
