= Escuela de rateros =

1958 film by Rogelio A. González

- Film poster
- Directed by: Rogelio A. González
- Written by: Luis Alcoriza
- Produced by: Antonio Matouk
- Starring: Pedro Infante, Yolanda Varela, Rosa Arenas, Rosa Elena Durgel, Bárbara Gil
- Cinematography: Alex Phillips
- Edited by: Rafael Ceballos
- Music by: Sergio Guerrero
- Release date: 9 May 1958 (Mexico)
- Running time: 95 min
- Country: Mexico
- Language: Spanish

Escuela de rateros ("School of Thieves") is a 1958 Mexican film directed by Rogelio A. González and starring Pedro Infante, Yolanda Varela, Rosa Arenas, Rosa Elena Durgel and Bárbara Gil. It was Infante's last film. It also raises awareness about violence against women.

== Cast ==
- Pedro Infante as the butcher Víctor Valdés/Raúl Cuesta Hernández
- Yolanda Varela as Víctor's lover
- Rosa Arenas as Rosaura Villarreal
- Rosa Elena Durgel as Sgt. Martha Angulo
- Bárbara Gil as Alicia
- Eduardo Fajardo as Eduardo, jewellery robber
- Eduardo Alcaraz as Toño
- Raúl Ramírez as Pablo, lawyer and Alicia's brother
- Luis Aragón as Lt. López
- Luis Manuel Pelayo as Félix, the joker
- José Jasso as Martínez
- Arturo Soto Rangel as the banker
- Fellove as the singer
- Carlos Múzquiz as Commander
- Roberto G. Rivera as the policeman
- Armando Acosta as a party guest
- Daniel Arroyo as a party guest
- René Barrera as the detective
- Lonka Becker as the host of the party
- Carlos Bravo y Fernández as the majordomo
- Rodolfo Calvo as Sr. de Villareal (uncredited)
- Enrique Carrillo as the policeman
- Alfonso Carti es the Cpt. policeman
- Arturo Castro Bigotón as the arrested man
- María Luisa Cortés as a party guest
- Mario García Harapos as the bartender
- Jesús Gómez as a party guest
- Leonor Gómez as the woman at the market
- Rubén Márquez as a party guest
- Lina Regis as a party guest

== Bibliography ==
- Monsiváis, Carlos (June 27, 2012). Pedro Infante. Las leyes del querer. Penguin Random House Grupo Editorial México. p. 278. ISBN 9786071115584.
