= Pegando con tubo =

1961 film by Jaime Salvador

Pegando con tubo is a 1961 Mexican comedy film written by Roberto Gómez Bolaños, directed by Jaime Salvador and starring Viruta and Capulina, Rosina Navarro and Socorro Navarro. This is the only film in which the Navarro sisters play Rosina and Socorro Manzano.

== Cast ==
- Marco Antonio Campos as Viruta
- Gaspar Henaine as Capulina
- Rosina Navarro as Rosina Manzano
- Socorro Navarro as Socorro Manzano
- Quintín Bulnes as El Rascabuches
- Arturo Castro "Bigotón" as Don José Manzano
- José Jasso "El Ojón" as Sergeant
- Roberto Meyer as Commander
- Francisco Reiguera as Doctor
- Arturo Bosch as Policeman
- Mario García "Harapos" as Policeman
- Francisco Meneses as Policeman
- Felipe de Flores as Policeman
- Mario Cid as Theatre actor (uncredited)
- Pedro Elviro (uncredited)
