= Little Trapeze Angels =

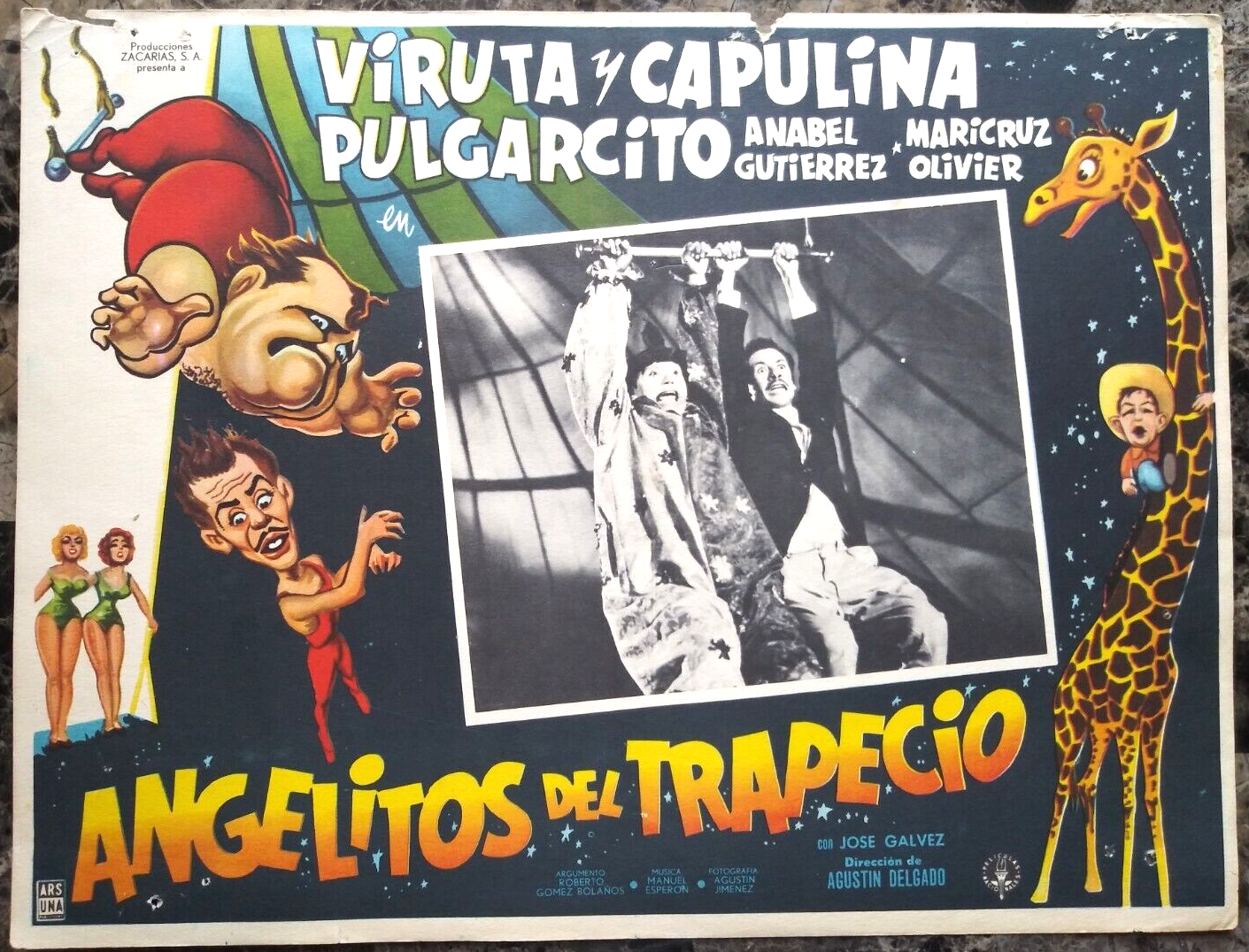
- Directed by: Agustín P. Delgado
- Written by: Agustín P. Delgado (adaptation)
- Screenplay by: Roberto Gómez Bolaños
- Produced by: Mario A. Zacarías; Miguel Zacarías
- Starring: Marco Antonio Campos; Gaspar Henaine; Cesareo Quezadas "Pulgarcito"; Anabel Gutiérrez; Maricruz Olivier
- Cinematography: Agustín Jiménez
- Edited by: José W. Bustos
- Music by: Manuel Esperón
- Production company: Producciones Zacarías
- Release date: 3 September 1959 (Mexico)
- Running time: 85 minutes
- Country: Mexico
- Language: Spanish

Little Trapeze Angels (Spanish: "Angelitos del trapecio") is a 1959 Mexican comedy film produced by Mario A . Zacarías and Miguel Zacarías, writted by Roberto Gómez Bolaños, directed by Agustín P. Delgado and starring Viruta and Capulina, Cesareo Quezadas "Pulgarcito", Anabel Gutiérrez and Maricruz Olivier..

== Story ==
Viruta and Capulina drive across the country selling miraculous water, which they found sprouting from a rock after saying a very particular word. They arrive at a circus owned by the clown Rigoletto. Rigoletto, who has gout, is also the father of Pulgarcito, a boy, and aerialists Tina and Lina. This disease has him bedridden and with severe leg pain, thus unable to perform.

Viruta and Capulina convince people of their miracle product's credibility, which they call The Elixir That Cures Everything. Rigoletto finds out and asks his daughters to bring these two "doctors" to him after the performance.

Viruta and Capulina enter the circus tent and promote their Elixir That Cures Everything. However, Rigoletto still can't act, so Viruta and Capulina go on stage to perform Rigoletto's number. Both are invited to stay in the circus to the public's liking, sympathizing with Tina and Lina. The girls' suitors and Pulgarcito, the aerialists' brother, don't like the idea and decide to disguise themselves as ghosts and scare the two new members.

Capulina climbs onto the trapeze platform believing that one of her assistants is trying to make Lina fall. In an attempt to rescue her, Capulina ends up swinging on a trapeze without reaching the edge. Viruta decides to help his friend in danger but has the same fate since neither knows how to use the trapeze correctly. Finally, both fall to the ground and end up significantly injured, but thanks to their elixir, they recover their health.

Viruta and Capulina confess that they are not doctors and that their Elixir That Cures Everything is simply water. Still, the evidence was clear, Rigoletto has been cured of gout, the magician of pain from an ulcer, and them of their fall. Hence, they decide to return to the rock where the miraculous water gushed out.

Comically, Capulina does not remember the magic word used to sprout the magic water. Still, Pulgarcito managed to pronounce Parangaricutirimícuaro (pa-ran-gari-cuti-rimi-cua-ro). The water gushed out again, changing the lives of those present.

== Cast ==
Character	Performed by
Viruta	Marco Antonio Campos
Capulina	Gaspar Henaine
Lina	Anabelle Gutierrez
Tina	Maricruz Olivier
Pulgarcito	Cesareo Quezadas
Ringmaster (Lina's suitor)	José Galvez
Magician (Tina's suitor)	Armando Sáenz
Rigoletto (Lina, Tina and Pulgarcito's father)	Arturo Castro
