= El camino de los espantos =

- Directed by: Gilberto Martínez Solares
- Screenplay by: Roberto Gómez Bolaños
- Produced by: Mario A. Zacarías
- Starring: Marco Antonio Campos; Gaspar Henaine; Elsa Cárdenas; Salomé
- Cinematography: Raúl Martínez Solares
- Edited by: Gloria Schoemann
- Music by: Sergio Guerrero
- Production company: Estudios Churubusco
- Distributed by: Nacional Cinematográfica; Producciones Zacarías
- Release date: 28 December 1967 (Mexico)
- Running time: 85 minutes
- Country: Mexico
- Language: Spanish

El camino de los espantos ("The Specters' Road") is a 1967 Mexican horror comedy film produced by Mario A. Zacarías, written by Roberto Gómez Bolaños, directed by Gilberto Martínez Solares and starring Viruta and Capulina, Elsa Cárdenas and Salomé. This is the last installment of the Viruta and Capulina film franchise.

== Plot ==
On a stormy night, a group of diverse travelers is taken on the haunted path across the Sierra Negra.

== Cast ==
- Marco Antonio Campos as Viruta
- Gaspar Henaine as Capulina
- Elsa Cárdenas as Adelita
- Salomé as Valentina
- Crox Alvarado as Zopilote
- Guillermo Rivas as Policeman
- Consuelo Monteagudo as Matilde
- Mario García as Serapio
- Arturo Ripstein as Matilde and Serapio's Son (credited as Arturo Rossen)
- Nathanael León as Telegraphist
- Manuel Barrera Nápoli as Bartender
