= El dolor de pagar la renta =

- Directed by: Agustín P. Delgado
- Screenplay by: Agustín P. Delgado
- Story by: Roberto Gómez Bolaños
- Produced by: Miguel Zacarías
- Starring: Marco Antonio Campos; Gaspar Henaine; Cesáreo Quezadas; Lilia Guízar; Norma Lazareno; Rosa Cué
- Cinematography: Agustín Jiménez
- Edited by: José W. Bustos
- Music by: Gustavo César Carrión
- Production company: Estudios Churubusco
- Distributed by: Producciones Zacarías
- Release date: 6 October 1960
- Running time: 98 minutes
- Country: Mexico
- Language: Spanish

El dolor de pagar la renta (English: The Pain of Paying Rent) is a 1960 Mexican comedy film produced by Miguel Zacarías, written by Roberto Gómez Bolaños, directed Agustín P. Delgado and starring Viruta and Capulina, Cesáreo Quezadas «Pulgarcito» y las actrices, Norma Lazareno, Rosa Cue, Lilia Guízar, Amparito Arozamena y Celia Viveros.

== Cast ==
- Marco Antonio Campos as Viruta
- Gaspar Henaine as Capulina
- Cesáreo Quezadas as Juanito
- Lilia Guízar as Lulu
- Norma Lazareno as Cristina
- Rose Cué as Martita
- Miguel Suárez as Don Próspero
- Mercedes Ruffino as Robusta
- Tito Novaro as Patiño
- Celia Viveros as Doña Chole
- Amparo Arozamena as Duquesa
- Julián de Meriche as El sordo Tapia
- Jorge Casanova as Policeman
- Armando Acosta as Policeman
- Guillermo Hernández as Lulu's Uncle
- Miguel Córcega as Paco
