= Qué perra vida =

- Directed by: Jaime Salvador
- Written by: Jaime Salvador (story and screenplay)
- Produced by: Pedro Galindo, Jr.
- Starring: Marco Antonio Campos; Gaspar Henaine; Norma Mora; Magda Urvizu; Rayo
- Cinematography: Agustín Jiménez
- Edited by: Jorge Bustos
- Music by: Antonio Díaz Conde
- Production company: Estudios Churubusco
- Release date: 3 March 1962 (Mexico)
- Running time: 89 minutes
- Country: Mexico
- Language: Spanish

Qué perra vida (What a Dog Life) is a 1962 Mexican comedy film written and directed by Jaime Salvador, and starring Viruta y Capulina, Norma Mora, Magda Urvizu and Rayo.

== Cast ==
- Marco Antonio Campos as Viruta (credited as Viruta)
- Gaspar Henaine as Capulina (credited as Capulina)
- Norma Mora as Marta
- Magda Urvizu as Ofelia
- Rayo as Rayo
- Omar Jasso as Comisario Artemio Lozano
- Yerye Beirute as Gaspar Toloso
- Manuel Arvide as Attorney Rómulo Monzón
- Arturo Castro 'Bigotón' as Abarrotero (as Arturo 'Bigotón' Castro)
- Lupe Carriles as Esposa de Gaspar
- Alberto Catalá as Policía
- Edmundo Espino as Don Abelardo
- Chel López as Drunkard in jail (uncredited)
