= Los legionarios =

1958 film by Agustín P. Delgado

- Directed by: Agustín P. Delgado
- Screenplay by: Agustín P. Delgado
- Story by: Roberto Gómez Bolaños
- Starring: María Antonieta Pons; Marco Antonio Campos; Gaspar Henaine
- Cinematography: Alex Phillips
- Edited by: Charles L. Kimball
- Music by: Manuel Esperón
- Production company: Estudios Churubusco
- Distributed by: Producciones Zacarías
- Release date: 7 August 1958 (Mexico)
- Running time: 96 minutes
- Country: Mexico
- Language: Spanish

Los legionarios ("The Legionnaires") is a 1958 Mexican comedy film writted by Roberto Gómez Bolaños, directed by Agustín P. Delgado and starring Viruta and Capulina, María Antonieta Pons and Donna Behar.This is the first part of a trilogy of fantasy films based in the desert, including La odalisca No. 13 (1958) and Los tigres del desierto (1960).

== Cast ==
- María Antonieta Pons as Sheila
- Marco Antonio Campos as Legionnaire Viruta (as Viruta)
- Gaspar Henaine as Legionnaire Capulina (as Capulina)
- Luis Lomelí as Prince Omar
- Vicky Codina as Farida (as Bárbara Codina)
- Donna Behar as Harem Singer
- Pedro de Aguillón as The Sheik
- Marc Lambert as Legionnaire Sergeant
- Jorge Alzaga as Abdulah
- Jenny Duina as Odalisque
- Emma Grise as Odalisque (as Emma Grisse)
