= Los reyes del volante =

- Directed by: Miguel Morayta
- Screenplay by: Roberto Gómez Bolaños
- Story by: Marco Antonio Campos
- Produced by: Mario A. Zacarías
- Starring: Marco Antonio Campos; Gaspar Henaine; Fanny Cano
- Cinematography: Agustín Jiménez
- Edited by: José W. Bustos
- Music by: Manuel Esperón
- Production company: Producciones Zacarías
- Release date: 25 November 1965 (Mexico)
- Running time: 85 minutes
- Country: Mexico
- Language: Spanish

Los reyes del volante ("Kings of the steering wheel") is a 1965 Mexican comedy film writted by Roberto Gómez Bolaños "Chespirito" and Marco Antonio Campos "Viruta", produced by Mario A. Zacarías, directed by Miguel Morayta and starring Viruta and Capulina and Fanny Cano, with the special participation of Xavier López "Chabelo".
