= Los tigres del desierto =

- Directed by: Agustín P. Delgado
- Written by: Agustín P. Delgado; Roberto Gómez Bolaños
- Produced by: Miguel Zacarías
- Starring: Marco Antonio Campos "Viruta"; Gaspar Henaine "Capulina"; Donna Behar; Lorena Velázquez
- Cinematography: Agustín Jiménez
- Edited by: Gloria Schoemann
- Music by: Gustavo César Carrión
- Production company: Producciones Zacarías
- Release date: 6 January 1960
- Running time: 101 minutes
- Country: Mexico
- Language: Spanish

Los tigres del desierto ("The Desert Tigers") is a 1960 Mexican comedy film produced by Miguel Zacarías, writted by Roberto Gómez Bolaños, directed by Agustín P. Delgado and starring Viruta and Capulina, Donna Behar and Lorena Velázquez. This was the last part of a trilogy of fantasy films based in the desert, including Los legionarios (1958) and La odalisca No. 13 (1958).

== Plot ==
It begins with Prince Omar heading to Europe, leaving his infant child in the care of Viruta, Capulina, Donna, and his father-in-law, with the four of them getting in an argument over who is in charge, interrupted by the sounds of the crying baby. They then head inside to soothe the baby, and Capulina and Viruta argue over who gets to hold the baby, Capulina declares himself the mother and Viruta the father in a humorous way. Capulina remarks how the food is not enough to feed even a baby and eats some pastry, with the father in law getting into an argument with Capulina and covering his face in pastry. Capulina heads outside while cleaning his face, but gets hit by a flying object on his head and goes unconscious. It turns out to be a letter which asks for 100,000 libras (pounds) or the bandits will take the baby as ransom by a bandit leader called one eyed man, which makes the father in law anxious and state his baby is worth more than that, and makes Capulina and Viruta ask whether the baby is worth that much gold and suggest that it is more logical to stop the bandit leader.

The one eyed man and his bandits are in a tavern, and a French woman named Yvonne is scantily clad in a dress and made to dance in front of the men against her will, as the one eyed man says he will only stop once she earns 500 pounds or marries him. During the dance, a French soldier named Gérard recognizes her and offers to help her, she tells him she got stuck here after searching this area for her missing father, and says he is the assistant of her father who is alive and well in France, taking her to the horse to escape, but he gets killed when the one eyed man throws a knife onto his back. The father in law along with Capulina and Viruta are holding a royal court for those who require assistance, with a man complaining about 14 boxes of dates stolen at his warehouse with only a knife as evidence and he is paid compensation, and a man who showed them photos of Capulina kissing his fiancée, with Capulina showing no regret and requests the pictures to be even bigger. Viruta gives him a "punishment" of not being allowed to eat the Mexican chillis, but they both end up eating it and the father in law does as well, but the father in law finds it too spicy and runs away. Yvonne ends up escaping on the horse, though the horse dies she was found and brought to the palace by strangers. Capulina becomes infatuated with her and they serve her food and talk to her. Donna meets the father in law in his bedroom where he is trying to wash out the spice from his mouth, he then tries to sit on his chair but it has a pin, he goes to the door but it hurts his toe, and he walks through the door and water falls on him, making him upset. Yvonne mentions that she has a fiancé named Gastón and that she was deceived by the one eyed man into becoming captive because she was searching for her father and told everyone she met about it.

Gastón is talking to a Colonel in an office who tells him about a soldier's death (Gérard), and when he departs two proclaimed widows named Paz and Lucha see him and remark on his attractiveness, then they go to the Colonel asking about the letters the Colonel has apparently sent them claiming their husbands died heroic deaths, the Colonel cannot remember writing the letters to them which mention their deaths and the widows are skeptical of it, the Colonel notes they were last seen in Prince Omar's palace and that they were actually kicked out, and the duo ask whether they can have two military generals as husband each instead. Back in the palace, everyone decides to head to bed, with Capulina and Viruta being told to take care of the baby. Capulina and Viruta try to sing the baby to sleep while bandits outside attempt to steal it, Donna comes to sing her own song to make it sleep, when it does the bandits attempt to capture the baby but Capulina and Viruta unintentionally prevent them from doing so, until they become fixated on heading towards Yvonne's bedroom for affairs. First Capulina goes, and he gets hit by Yvonne who assumes he is a bandit. Capulina returns back to the room. Then Viruta goes and sees nobody is there in the room, and heads back. Capulina tries again, but this time Donna and Yvonne are already in the room and hit him again by accident, making him fall. During this the baby is stolen, which leaves all five of them in deep despair, however Viruta and Yvonne are determined to save the baby. Capulina is scared and starts packing to go back to Mexico, but Viruta dissuades him. The duo decide to head to the market according to a plan they made with Yvonne and Donna.

They purchase silk at a bargain, and then head to an odalisque store where they see different women who pose as statues with an owner giving them different sale prices in camels, and they consider their options, before revealing at the end they have no intent to buy and leaving. They head to a knife shop where they try to buy a knife, and the man from the store orders someone to kill him, but they accidentally just make the roof of the store fall on them which causes leopard skins to fall onto their heads like masks, scaring everyone around them. When they try to attack the duo, they inadvertently defeat 9 men through simply holding and lifting pieces of wood, making them seem like invincible entities they refer to as “tigers of the desert”. Eventually rumours spread about their power and it massively exaggerates how strong they are as invincible tigers and claims of them killing 50 men and gouging out their eyes, eventually even reaching the one eyed man. They then come upon the widows (who are their wives) by accident, who recognise them and head towards them, but before they can confront them they wear beards to hide their appearance. They get fooled and head to Gastón to ask him where they can spend the night, where he suggests an inn. They head to the restaurant where everyone is afraid of them and they head to a table where the one eyed man confronts them, scaring them initially and pouring a shake over his head. Capulina retaliates by smashing pastry on the one eyed man's face, who then retaliates by giving them both wine, and also gets a steel rod and bends it to show how strong he is. Viruta cannot bend it, but Capulina blows it into a straight rod with ease using only his mouth. The one eyed man then eats the rod, and Capulina eats some chillis from his jar. When the one eyed man also eats the chillis to contend, his mouth starts to burn and he runs away for water.

Capulina and Viruta eventually depart from the tavern, and use a barrel to step on and climb into the bandit fort, where they hide under alcohol barrels and hear the one eyed man and his bandits planning, but when the alcohol leaks out of the barrels they become addicted to drinking it and fight over who gets to drink the alcohol while still under the barrels in hiding. Gastón is then seen talking to the two widows, and pushing them into an alleyway to hide because he thought Donna and Yvonne, who were hiding as local townswomen, would see him flirting with the widows. Donna heads to the tavern and portrays herself as a dancer, impressing and appeasing the one eyed man to distract them so that Capulina, Viruta and Yvonne can rescue the baby. Yvonne heads deeper into the building and finds Capulina and Viruta drunk and leads them to the area where the guards are, tricking them by hiding behind a wall and Yvonne sticks her leg out so that the desperate guards head there and then Viruta strikes them with a stick. They do this with a second guard. Capulina takes the guards to a different room, but when heading back they hear someone and assume it's a guard, so Yvonne sticks her leg out and Capulina takes the bait in desperation, then Viruta strikes him and they get shocked when the two of them see Capulina.

They then find the baby in a room, but drunkenly struggle to bring him but eventually they do with Yvonne being the voice of reason, and they walk across a narrow ledge and Capulina insists on holding the baby despite walking dangerously and even throwing the baby to them. They decide to head to the house near it to keep the baby, but the widows are staying there and recognise them and pull out guns and start shooting at them, so they head back and go a different way to escape. The widows go inside the tavern and start shooting, getting into a gunfight with every bandit inside. Gastón finds Yvonne and asks her what's going on and she says she will explain later. Gastón confronts Capulina and Viruta on deserting the military angrily. Gastón readies his gun and heads into the tavern to stop the gunfight, but when they notice Capulina and Viruta as the desert tigers all the bandits get scared and run away, as the fight ends, with even the one eyed man bowing to them in fear and the wives also get scared of them. Yvonne who was holding the baby hands it back to Donna, and then she reunites with Gastón who is her fiancé, Capulina and Viruta reunite with their wives who have also calmed down and they all prepare to say their goodbyes, but then suddenly they start giving commands of dominance such as marching to their wives which makes them mad and they pull out their guns again and start chasing the two of them.

== Cast ==
This cast list is sourced from Emilio García Riera's Historia documental del cine mexicano.

- Marco Antonio Campos as Viruta
- Gaspar Henaine as Capulina
- Donna Behar as Donna
- Lorena Velázquez as Yvonne
- Rodolfo Landa as Lieutenant Gastón
- Yerye Beirute as El Tuerto (The One-Eyed Man)
- Pedro D'Aguillón as El Sheik (Prince Omar's father-in-law)
- Hortensia Clavijo as Lucha (Viruta's wife)
- Susana Cabrera as Paz (Capulina's wife)
- Miguel Arenas as Colonel of the Foreign Legion
- Humberto Almazán as Gérard
- Óscar Pulido as Doll Bazaar Owner
- Chel López as Arab Husband (uncredited)
- Ramón Sánchez as bandit (uncredited)
