= Fiebre de juventud =

- Directed by: Alfonso Corona Blake
- Written by: José María Fernández Unsáin
- Produced by: Alberto López
- Starring: Enrique Guzmán; Begoña Palacios; Rosa María Vázquez; Fernando Luján
- Cinematography: Raúl Martínez Solares
- Music by: Enrico C. Cabiati
- Production company: Filmadora Ecuatoriana
- Release date: 1 September 1966 (Mexico)
- Running time: 90 minutes
- Countries: Mexico; Ecuador
- Language: Spanish

Fiebre de juventud (English: "Youth Fever"), also known as Romance en Ecuador (English: "Romance in Ecuador"), is a 1966 Mexican-Ecuadorian musical comedy film directed by Alfonso Corona Blake and starring Enrique Guzmán, Begoña Palacios, Rosa María Vázquez and Fernando Luján.

== Plot ==
Carlos and Luis drop out of school and try to make it big with a music group, with considerable success. They travel to Ecuador and they meet two sisters, the beautiful Rita and the prudish Silvia. Luis and Rita fall madly in love and want to get married, but the sisters' father Don Jaime says the marriage has a condition: Silvia must get married first. Luis tries to convince Carlos to woo Silvia, but the two couldn't treat each other worse. However, their experiences together will cause love to be born out of hatred.

== Cast ==
- Enrique Guzmán as Carlos
- Begoña Palacios as Silvia
- Rosa María Vázquez as Rita
- Fernando Luján as Luis
- Ernesto Albán as Don Jaime
- Lucho Gálvez
- Alejandro Mata
- Julio Jaramillo

== Production ==
It was filmed in June 1965 in Guayaquil. It was one of several Mexican film productions that were shot on Ecuador, alongside films such as Peligro, mujeres en acción, Cómo enfriar a mi marido, 24 horas de placer, and Caín, abel y el otro.

== Release ==
The film had limited premieres in Mexico in the Variedades and Carrusel cinemas on 20 August 1966 before being shown at the Metropolitan cinema (Mexico City) from 1 September 1966, for three weeks.
