= Mayte Carol =

Mexican actress (1941–2024)

- Born: María Teresa Corral García; 13 October 1941; Mexico City, Mexico
- Died: 9 March 2024 (aged 82); Mexico City, Mexico
- Education: Instituto Nacional de Bellas Artes y Literatura
- Occupation: Actress
- Years active: 1965–2019
- Spouse: Miguel Palmer
- Children: 2

María Teresa Corral García (13 October 1941 – 9 March 2024), professionally known as Mayte Carol, was a Mexican actress.

== Early life and education ==
Mayte Carol was born on 13 October 1941 in Mexico City. She graduated from the National Institute of Fine Arts.

== Career ==
Mayte Carol acted mostly in films. Her credits include El patrullero 777, Los dos cuatreros, Frente al destino, Santo contra el estrangulador and Cuenta saldada. She also acted in theatre with Abrázame muy fuerte (2018). Her two last projects were La boda de mi mejor amigo and La Rosa de Guadalupe. Carol lived in New York and Buenos Aires for some time before returning to Mexico, taking part in the play Mi nuevo paciente (2017) afterwards. Her credits also include En peligro de muerte, Las hijas del Amapolo, Ruletero a toda marcha, Dos pintores pintorescos, Acapulco a go go, Los hermanos barragán and Nosotros los jóvenes. After her retirement, she stayed away from public life.

== Personal life and death ==
Mayte Carol was married to Miguel Palmer, with whom she had a daughter. Their marriage lasted 8 years. Carol also had a son, from another marriage. Mayte Carol died in Mexico City on 9 March 2024, aged 82. She had been hospitalized on 5 March, due to respiratory issues. Carol was first admitted to hospital on 3 January and was put in intensive care.

== Selected filmography ==
- La Boda de mi Mejor Amigo (2019)
- La Rosa de Guadalupe (2016)
- The Wailer 2 (2007)
- Entre melón y me lames (2006)
- Perra sociedad (2004)
- El raider (2002)
- Abuso (2001)
- Mojadas en sangre (2000)
- Cuenta saldada (2000)
- Tres mil kilómetros de amor (1967)
- Dos pintores pintorescos (1967)
- El pícaro (1967)
- Crisol (1967)
- Acapulco a go-gó (1967)
- Nosotros los jóvenes (1966)
- Santo contra el espectro de El Estrangulador (1965)
