= Buenos días, Acapulco =

1964 film

- Directed by: Agustín P. Delgado
- Written by: Roberto Gómez Bolaños
- Starring: Marco Antonio Campos; Gaspar Henaine; Silvia Fournier; Mayté Gaos; Ingrid Garbo
- Cinematography: Rosalío Solano
- Music by: Gustavo César Carrión
- Production company: Producciones Zacarías
- Release date: January 3, 1964 (Mexico)
- Running time: 85 minutes
- Country: Mexico
- Language: Spanish

Buenos días, Acapulco is a 1964 Mexican comedy film written by Roberto Gómez Bolaños, directed by Agustín P. Delgado and starring Viruta and Capulina, Silvia Fournier, Mayté Gaos and Ingrid Garbo. This film is the first part of a trilogy of films based in Acapulco, including El rey de Acapulco (1972) and El guia de las turistas (1976), both with Gaspar Henaine "Capulina".
