= La batalla de los pasteles =

- Directed by: Agustín P. Delgado
- Written by: Roberto Gómez Bolaños
- Starring: Marco Antonio Campos; Gaspar Henaine; Mayté Gaos; Pili Gaos
- Cinematography: Agustín Jiménez
- Edited by: Gloria Schoemann
- Music by: Raúl Lavista
- Production company: Producciones Zacarías
- Release date: October 27, 1966 (Mexico)
- Running time: 87 minutes
- Country: Mexico
- Language: Spanish

La batalla de los pasteles is a 1966 Mexican comedy film written by Roberto Gómez Bolaños, directed by Agustín P. Delgado and starring Viruta and Capulina and Mayté Gaos and Pili Gaos.
