= Detectives o ladrones..? =

- Directed by: Miguel Morayta
- Written by: Roberto Gómez Bolaños
- Produced by: Jesús Sotomayor Martínez
- Starring: Marco Antonio Campos «Viruta» Gaspar Henaine «Capulina» Héctor Lechuga; Manuel «Loco» Valdés; Cynthia Mandan
- Cinematography: Raul Martínez Solares
- Edited by: Carlos Savage
- Music by: Gustavo César Carrión
- Production company: Atenea Films
- Release date: June 22, 1967 (Mexico)
- Running time: 85 minutes
- Country: Mexico
- Language: Spanish

Detectives o ladrones..? ("Two Inocent Agents") is a 1967 Mexican comedy film produced by Jesús Sotomayor Martínez, written by Roberto Gómez Bolaños «Chespirito», directed by Miguel Morayta and starring Viruta and Capulina, Héctor Lechuga, Manuel «Loco» Valdés and Cynthia Mandan. This film features of which there is a special participation of Germán Valdés «Tin-Tan», Marta Romero, Jessica Munguía, Luis Aguilar and Raúl Meraz.
