= A sablazo limpio =

1958 film

- Directed by: Fernando Cortés
- Written by: Fernando Cortés; Fernando Galiana; José Luis Galiana; Carlos Sampelayo
- Produced by: Óscar J. Brooks; Ernesto Enríquez
- Starring: Marco Antonio Campos "Viruta"; Gaspar Henaine "Capulina"; Lucho Gatica; Carmela Rey
- Cinematography: Jack Draper
- Edited by: Carlos Savage
- Music by: Manuel Esperón
- Production company: Estudios San Ángel
- Distributed by: Brooks y Enríquez, S.A.
- Release date: 20 November 1958 (Mexico)
- Running time: 102 minutes
- Country: Mexico
- Language: Spanish

A sablazo limpio (A Quick Saber Slash) is a 1958 Mexican historical-comedy film written and directed by Fernando Cortés and starring Viruta and Capulina, Lucho Gatica and Carmela Rey. Set during the era of the Spanish viceroyalties, the film follows the adventures of two clumsy blacksmiths who become the servants of a masked-hero in disguise who is willing to uncover the uncontrolled spending and injustices of a governor and his military captain.

== Cast ==
- Marco Antonio Campos as Cornelius Viruta
- Gaspar Henaine as Crispín Capulina
- Lucho Gatica as "La Mascara Solitaria"
- Carmela Rey as Rosaura
- Rodolfo Landa as Captain Mendoza
- Guillermina Téllez Girón as María
- Luis Aldás as Jeremías de Montalbán
- Pedro de Aguillón as The Governor of Villa Paz
- Guillermo Álvarez Bianchi as María's father
- Florencio Castelló as "Faraón" (uncredited)
- Ricardo Adalid as Jail doorman (uncredited)

== Production ==
The film is notable for its lavish sets and costumes, designed by award-winning production designer Jorge Fernández, which accurately correspond to the historical era of the Spanish viceroyalties.

== Reception ==
A sablazo limpio premiered on November 20, 1958, in the Mariscala and Olimpia movie theaters for two weeks.
