= Marta Romero =

Puerto Rican actress (1928–2013)

- Born: 17 February 1928; Ponce, Puerto Rico
- Died: 31 May 2013 (aged 85); San Juan, Puerto Rico
- Occupations: Actress, singer

Marta Romero (17 February 1928 – 31 May 2013) was a Puerto Rican actress and singer, and one of the pioneers in Puerto Rican television.

== Early life ==
Romero was born on Calle Mora in downtown Ponce, a city in the south coast of Puerto Rico and was raised in Machuelo Abajo, then a rural neighborhood located on the road from Ponce to Juana Díaz. In 1940, when she was thirteen years old, she won the contest in a local radio station, Los aficionados de WPAB, an amateur show for performers. That led to other radio shows in musical programs, such as Variedades musicales and also acting parts in soap operas and Cosas de amor, among other programs broadcast through WPAB. In 1944, she became the lead female vocalist of the local Ponce orchestra Mingo & His Whoopie Kids and toured the Island. In 1946, for several months, she was also the lead singer for the orquestra of Abdías Villalonga and toured the Island again. Romero arrived in San Juan in 1950 and performed with a group composed, mostly, by young musicians, Los Bohemios. In 1953 she was a vocalist in the Combo de Sylvia Rexach. That same year she began her night club appearances, initially at the Vodoo Room of the Normandy Hotel as lead singer of the Joe Vallejo Combo. On radio, she became a regular singer in Revista informal and recorded her first single in 1954 for the Puerto Rican recording company, Marvela.

== Career ==
=== Television ===
Her debut on television was on 1954, shortly after the outset of television in Puerto Rico. As a singer, she sang in variety shows, such as Fiesta a las 9, Fandango Rheingold and Caravana, aired through the two tv stations at the time, WKAQ and WAPA. She got her first tv acting break in 1955 appearing in many of the tv dramas presented by Channel 2 (WKAQ), such as Domingo de amor Palmolive and Teleteatro Hunts, among others. She was also recruited for minor roles in two of the very first tv soap operas, Cautivo de amor and Tormenta de rosa. In 1956, she played Angustias in the successful Cuando los hijos condenan, a milestone soap opera that led to a complete change in the length of the genre.

Also in 1956, she became a regular member of the cast of the variety show La taberna India, a program that became the most popular show at time and the breakthrough for Cortijo y su combo, the most popular band of Puerto Rico during the 1950s. In 1957, she was the star, along with Gilbero Monroig, of Show Palmolive and in 1959 of Show Carnation, broadcast by Channel 2 and Channel 4, respectively. After supporting roles in soap operas, such as Sangre en la calle, Divorcio and Yo maté a una santa, Romero got top billing in Rafael Heredia: Gitano, opposite Esther Sandoval and Argentinian actor Enzo Bellomo. Other telenovelas in which she participated during the 1960s were Milagro de amor (1961), opposite Braulio Castillo, Nuestros hijos (1962),La sombra del otro(1963),Entre tu amor y mi fe" (1963), Busquen a esta mujer (1967) "Entre el puñal y la cruz. Her most successful soap opera during the 1960s was La divina infiel (1961), where she played a singer estranged from her two daughters by a jealous husband. The soap opera was so popular that they made a theater adaption that toured the whole Island. In 1977, she made her last appearance in a telenovela, performing in Pueblo Chico (Small Town).

=== Theater ===
On 19 May 1960, Romero made her official onstage debut with the play En el Principio la noche era serena (At the Beginning the Night was Serene), written by Gerard Paul Marín, and performed at San Juan's Municipal Teatro Tapia. Among others, her performances onstage in Puerto Rico were La Cuarterona (The Wicket), in 1967; Maribel y la extraña familia (Maribel and the Strange Family) in 1969, and El Hombre, la Bestia y la Virtud (The Man, the Beast and the Virtue), Romero's last performance on stage.

=== Singing ===
In 1963, she recorded her first album as a singer, Marta Romero Canta (SALP-1336), This LP includes, the boleros "Es tarde ya" (It's Too Late Now), composed by Sylvia Rexach and "¿Qué sabes tú?" (What Do You Know?), composed by Myrta Silva.

In 1965, she performed at the Lírico Theater in Mexico. During her frequent performances, her musical director was Mexican composer and pianist Armando Manzanero.

=== Film career ===
In 1959, Marta Romero performed the leading role in Maruja, one of the first Puerto Rican films actually made in Puerto Rico. Later, she starred in several films in Puerto Rico: Ayer Amargo (Bitter Yesterday) in 1959; La fiebre del deseo (The Fever of Desire), La piel desnuda (The Naked Skin) and Mientras Puerto Rico duerme (Meanwhile, Puerto Rico Sleeps) in 1964; Bello amanecer (Beautiful Daybreak) in 1966 and Amor perdóname (Forgive Me Love) in 1967.

In Mexico City she starred in El Señor Doctor (Mister Doctor) with Mario Moreno Cantinflas and Miguel Angel Alvarez, and Retablos del Tepeyac (Altarpieces of Tepeyac) in 1965; "Casa de mujeres" (House of Women) with Dolores del Río, Matar es fácil (Killing is Easy ) in 1966; La fiera (The Wild Beast), La sombra del murciélago (The Shadow of the Bat), Las vampiras/Deseo de sangre (The vampires/Desire for blood), with John Carradine, Un Latin lover en Acapulco (A Latin Lover in Acapulco) in 1967, and Una puertorriqueña en Acapulco (A Puerto Rican Girl in Acapulco) in 1968.

== Personal life ==
Romero was married five different times. Her first husband was the Puerto Rican singer Felipe Rodriguez, "La voz". In 1981 she was married for the last time, to Elías Najul Bez. The couple established their home in the municipality of Isabela, Puerto Rico. Najul Bez died in 2006.

== Later years and honors ==
Romero retired as an actress and bolero singer because she embraced the Christian faith in the Puerta del Cielo (Heaven's Door) church, located in Caguas, Puerto Rico in 1975. Later, she became a preacher at "Iglesia de Dios Pentecostal" (Pentecostal Church of God), and continued vocalizing Christian gospel songs. In the 1980s, she recorded her last album as an evidence of her faith in God, titled "He Vuelto a Nacer" (I Have Been Born Again). She died 31 May 2013. On 21 September 2013, the city of Ponce dedicated the 2013 edition of its Dia Mundial de Ponce to her. On 12 December 2013, Romero was honored with a ceremony and added to the list of illustrious Ponce citizens at the Park of the Illustrious Ponce Citizens in Ponce's Tricentennial Park.

== Filmography ==
=== Cinema ===
- 1959: Maruja : Maruja
- 1959: Ayer Amargo Juana
- 1964: Mientras Puerto Rico duerme
- 1965: El señor doctor : Laura Villanueva
- 1966: La fiebre del deseoMarta
- 1966: La piel desnuda
- 1966: Casa de mujeres: La Mundial/Sara
- 1966: Matar es fácil: Lover of Jorge
- 1966: La sombra del murciélago
- 1966: Retablos de la Guadalupana
- 1966: Detectives o ladrones..?: herself
- 1967: Amor perdóname Marta Núñez
- 1968: Un Latin lover en Acapulco
- 1969: Las vampiras: Aura

=== Telenovelas ===
- 1956: Tormento de rosas
- 1956: Cautivo de amor
- 1956: Cuando los hijos condenan: Angustias
- 1957: Sangre en la calle
- 1959: Divorcio
- 1959: Yo maté a una santa
- 1959: Rafael Heredia: gitano
- 1961: Milagro de amor
- 1961: La divina infiel: Laura
- 1962: Nuestros hijos
- 1963: Entre tu amor y mi fe
- 1963: La sombra del otro
- 1967: Busquen a esta mujer
- 1969: Entre el puñal y la cruz
- 1969: La gaviota : Coralina
- 1970: Historia de dos mujeres
- 1970: Cuando los hijos condenan: María Victoria
- 1971: María del mar
- 1972: Mi nombre es Martina Solá
- 1977 Pueblo chico

== Theater ==
- 1960: En el principio la noche era serena: La amante
- 1961: María Soledad: María Soledad
- 1961: La farsa del amor compradito: Colombina
- 1962: Fuenteovejuna: Laurencia
- 1964: El cuervo
- 1964: O casi el alma: La mujer/Maggie
- 1967: La cuarterona: Julia
- 1968: La heredera: Ellen
- 1969: Maribel y la extraña familia: Maribel
- 1971: Un niño Azul para esa sombra: Mercedes
- 1973: El Hombre, la bestia y la virtud

== See also ==
- Cinema of Puerto Rico
- List of Puerto Ricans
- Lucy Boscana
- Miguel Angel Alvarez
