= Lucy Gallardo =

Argentine-born Mexican actress and screenwriter

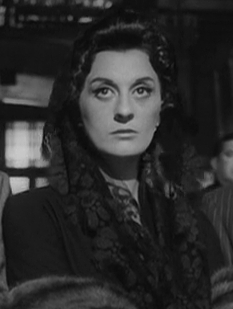
- Gallardo in The Exterminating Angel (1962)
- Born: Lucía Elida Cardarelli; 13 December 1929; Buenos Aires, Argentina
- Died: 11 August 2012 (aged 82); Los Angeles, California, U.S.
- Occupation: Actress
- Years active: 1949–2005

Lucy Gallardo (December 13, 1929 – August 11, 2012) was an Argentine-born Mexican actress and screenwriter. She was best known for her numerous roles in Mexican cinema, as well as Mexico's telenovelas. Gallardo was the widow of Mexican actor Enrique Rambal.

== Life ==
She was born in Buenos Aires, Argentina on December 13, 1929. Gallardo made her film debut in the 1949 Argentine movie, Angeles de uniforme. She later moved from Argentina to Mexico to pursue her acting career.

Gallardo appeared in dozens of films throughout her career. She was cast in the 1962 film, The Exterminating Angel, which was directed and written by Luis Buñuel. She appeared in that film opposite her husband, Enrique Rambal, who died in 1971. Gallardo and Rambal also starred as a comical couple in the Capulina aviation comedy, El Mundo de los Aviones.

Her numerous telenovela roles included El Amor Tiene Cara de Mujer (Love Has a Female Face), portraying the character of Lucy Scala in the Mexican remake of an Argentine television series during the 1970s. In addition to acting, Gallardo also worked as a screenwriter for telenovelas as well. Her recent telenovela writing credits included Cosecharás tu Siembra (You Reap What You Sow) and La Extraña Dama (Strange Lady).

Gallardo's Mexican theater credits included roles in Aurelia y Sus Hombres, Los Grandes Sebastiani, and La Mujer Asesinadita.

Gallardo resided in Los Angeles, California, for the last twenty-five years of her life with her daughter, actress and television host Rebeca Rambal. In 1997, Gallardo starred in the radio drama, La Historia de Quien Soy (The Story of Who I Am), created by the Family Theater Productions' Voz Latina division. Gallardo portrayed the family matriarch in the production, which is believed to be the first Spanish-language radio show produced in Los Angeles specifically for Hispanics living in the city.

Gallardo co-starred in the 2005 American film How the Garcia Girls Spent Their Summer, with America Ferrera and Elizabeth Peña.

Lucy Gallardo died from chronic obstructive pulmonary disease on August 11, 2012, at her home in Los Angeles at the age of 82. She was survived by her daughter, Rebeca Rambal.
