= Dos pintores pintorescos =

- Directed by: René Cardona, Jr.
- Screenplay by: Roberto Gómez Bolaños
- Story by: Alfredo Zacarías
- Produced by: Miguel Zacarías
- Starring: Marco Antonio Campos; Gaspar Henaine; Regina Torné; Gilda Mirós; Emilia Stuart
- Cinematography: Rosalío Solano
- Edited by: Gloria Schoemann
- Music by: Raúl Lavista
- Production company: Producciones Zacarías
- Release date: October 19, 1967 (Mexico)
- Running time: 87 minutes
- Country: Mexico
- Language: Spanish

Dos pintores pintorescos (lit. Two picturesque painters) is a 1967 Mexican comedy film written by Roberto Gómez Bolaños, directed by René Cardona, Jr. and starring Viruta and Capulina, Regina Torné, Gilda Mirós and Emilia Stuart. It was shot in Eastmancolor with cinematography by Rosalío Solano.

== Plot ==
Viruta and Capulina are two painters who work painting skyscrapers. One day, while lunching on a scaffolding, Capulina accidentally spills paint onto a policeman down under and he decides to escape by walking off the scaffolding. He falls, but he rapidly holds on to Viruta as he tries to stand against a window. On the other side of that window, a man named Lorenzo stabs a certain woman meanwhile his lover Carmina is watching. As Capulina stands next to the window, Lorenzo and Carmina see him as he tells them that he has "never seen death from up close". Lorenzo, believing that Capulina has witnessed the crime, searches for his gun meanwhile Capulina achieves safety when Viruta hauls the scaffolding downward as he picks him up. As both Viruta and Capulina get out of Lorenzo's reach, they encounter the policeman to whom they spilled paint who fines them two-hundred pesos as punishment.

After another incident with a painting, Capulina decides to become an artist instead of a painter as he confirms his occupation's danger. Viruta and Capulina also visit a nearby artists' club where they meet two beautiful art students, Diana and Julia. Both Diana and Julia study art at the studio of Diana's father, an Italian art professor. Viruta and Capulina manage to negotiate a deal with the professor in order to receive art classes. As a result of the negotiation, Viruta and Capulina paint the walls of various rooms within the studio.

== Cast ==
- Marco Antonio Campos as Viruta
- Gaspar Henaine as Capulina "Capuso"
- Regina Torné as Diana
- Gilda Mirós as Julia
- Miguel Córcega as Lorenzo
- Emilia Stuart as Carmina (credited as Emilia Suart)
- Eduardo Alcaráz as Professor
- Nathanael León as Policeman
- Mayte Carol as Murdered Woman
- Consuelo Monteagudo as Painting Buyer
- Victor Eberg as Painting Vendor
- Enrique del Castillo as Paint Store Owner
- Los Hooligans as Musical Band

== Production ==
Dos pintores pintorescos was filmed from December 14 through December 26, 1966 in Estudios Churubusco and on location in Mexico City.

== Release ==
The film premiered on October 8, 1967 in the Cine Cuitláhuac, in Mexico City, before being distributed in theatres from October 19 onwards..
