= La edad de piedra =

- Directed by: René Cardona
- Written by: Alfredo Zacarías
- Produced by: Alfredo Zacarías
- Starring: Marco Antonio Campos; Gaspar Henaine; Lorena Velázquez; Sonia Infante
- Cinematography: Raúl Martínez Solares
- Edited by: Carlos Savage
- Music by: Manuel Esperón
- Production company: Producciones Zacarías
- Release date: December 24, 1964 (Mexico)
- Running time: 90 minutes
- Country: Mexico
- Language: Spanish

La edad de piedra is a 1964 Mexican comedy film produced and written by Alfredo Zacarías, directed by René Cardona and starring Viruta and Capulina, Lorena Velázquez and Sonia Infante.

== Cast ==
- Marco Antonio Campos as Viruta
- Gaspar Henaine as Capulina
- Lorena Velázquez as Uga
- Sonia Infante as Moa
- René Cardona Jr. as Dr.Atom
- Eduardo Silvestre as Pitekus
- Jorge Beirute as King of cave people
- Nathanael León as Troglos (as Nothanel León Moreno 'Frankenstein')
- Víctor Manuel Castro as Stuttering man (as Manuel Castro)
- Guillermo Bravo Sosa as Spy
- Mario García 'Harapos' as Lagartija
- Manuel Dondé as Spy
- Juan José Martínez Casado as Spy Chief
- Celia Viveros as Petrita
- Fernando Yapur as Man In Radio
- Julián de Meriche as Father of Sarita
- Jorge Arvizu as Robot (voice)
- Roy Fletcher
- Roberto y Palacios
- Darío Vivián
