= The Invasion of the Vampires =

1963 film by Miguel Morayta

- Directed by: Miguel Morayta
- Written by: Miguel Morayta
- Produced by: Rafael Pérez Grovas
- Starring: Erna Martha Bauman; Rafael del Río; Tito Junco; Fernando Soto "Mantequilla"; Bertha Moss; Carlos Agostí
- Cinematography: Raúl Martínez Solares
- Edited by: Gloria Schoemann
- Music by: Luis Hernández Bretón
- Release date: 20 June 1963 (Mexico)
- Running time: 92 minutes
- Country: Mexico
- Language: Spanish

The Invasion of the Vampires (Spanish: La invasión de los vampiros) is a 1963 Mexican horror mystery thriller film written and directed by Miguel Morayta, and starring Erna Martha Bauman, Rafael del Río, Tito Junco, Fernando Soto "Mantequilla", Bertha Moss and Carlos Agostí. This film is part of a duology of vampire films directed by Morayta, preceded by The Bloody Vampire (1962).

An English-language dub version was released in 1965, produced by K. Gordon Murray for American International Pictures.

== Cast ==
- Erna Martha Bauman as Brunhilda Frankenhausen
- Rafael del Río as Dr. Ulises Albarrán
- Tito Junco as Marquis Gonzalo Guzmán de la Serna
- Fernando Soto "Mantequilla" as Crescencio (as Fernando Soto "Mantequilla")
- Bertha Moss as Frau Hildegarda
- Carlos Agostí as Count Frankenhausen
- Enrique Lucero as Lázaro
- David Reynoso as Don Máximo, Mayor
- Enrique García Álvarez as Father Victor
- José Chávez as Village Man
- Victorio Blanco as Village Old Man (uncredited)
- Mario Cid as Paulino, Mayor's Son (uncredited)
- Armando Gutiérrez as Don Efrén, physician (uncredited)
- Leonor Gómez as Village Woman (uncredited)

== Reception ==
Rob Craig in American International Pictures: A Comprehensive Filmography gave a very positive review of the film, saying "It is a genuinely creepy and moving example of modern Gothic horror, and may be the showpiece of K. Gordon Murray horror canon. There is high drama, supernatural revelation, and even some sexual perversity in this strongest of Mexican horror imports."
