= Sacrificed Women =

1952 film by Alberto Gout Àbrego

- Directed by: Alberto Gout
- Written by: José Carbo
- Produced by: Guillermo Calderón; Pedro A. Calderón
- Starring: Ninón Sevilla; Roberto Cañedo; Víctor Junco; Anita Blanch
- Cinematography: Alex Phillips
- Edited by: Alfredo Rosas Priego
- Music by: Antonio Díaz Conde
- Production company: Producciones Calderón
- Distributed by: Azteca Films
- Release date: 10 July 1952
- Running time: 94 minutes
- Country: Mexico
- Language: Spanish

Sacrificed Women (Spanish: Mujeres sacrificadas) is a 1952 Mexican drama film directed by Alberto Gout and starring Ninón Sevilla, Roberto Cañedo and Víctor Junco. It was shot at the Churubusco Studios in Mexico City. The film's sets were designed by the art director Manuel Fontanals. Some scenes were shot in Eastmancolor.

== Cast ==
- Ninón Sevilla as Gracierla Montero
- Roberto Cañedo as Octavio
- Víctor Junco as Mario Galindo
- Anita Blanch as Ana, madre de Graciela
- Manuel Casanueva as Hombre de negro
- Gloria Cansino
- Waldo Custodio as Empresario francés
- Felipe Montoya as Señor juez
- Joaquín Roche as Agente de ministerio público
- Roberto G. Rivera as Carlos
- Celia Viveros as Maestra
- Armando Arriola
- Roberto Meyer as Doctor
- Víctor Velázquez
- Arturo Soto Urena
- Agustín Lara as Cantante
- Mona Gildes as Cantante
- Consuelo Vidal as Cantante
- Jimmy Romany
- Daniel Arroyo as Hombre en baile
- Jorge Chesterking as Hombre en baile
- Leonor Gómez as Mujer en comisaría
- Cecilia Leger as Enfermera
- Pepe Martínez as Mesero
- Ángel Merino as Joaquín

== Bibliography ==
- Rogelio Agrasánchez. Carteles de la época de oro del cine mexicano. Archivo Fílmico Agrasánchez, 1997.
