= Un par de robachicos =

- Directed by: René Cardona, Jr.
- Written by: Roberto Gómez Bolaños
- Produced by: Miguel Zacarías
- Starring: Marco Antonio Campos; Gaspar Henaine; Ofelia Montesco
- Cinematography: Rosalío Solano
- Edited by: Gloria Schoemann
- Music by: Raúl Lavista
- Production company: Producciones Zacarías
- Release date: November 9, 1967 (Mexico)
- Running time: 80 minutes
- Country: Mexico
- Language: Spanish

Un par de robachicos is a 1967 Mexican family and child comedy film produced by Miguel Zacarías, written by Roberto Gómez Bolaños directed by René Cardona, Jr. and starring Viruta and Capulina and Ofelia Montesco. This is the second part of a trilogy of family and child films, including La cigüeña distraída (1966) and El nano (1971).
