= Dos locos en escena =

- Directed by: Agustín P. Delgado
- Written by: Agustín P. Delgado
- Screenplay by: Roberto Gómez Bolaños
- Produced by: Mario A. Zacarías
- Starring: Marco Antonio Campos; Gaspar Henaine; Flor Silvestre; Marina Camacho
- Cinematography: Agustín Jiménez
- Edited by: José W. Bustos
- Music by: Francisco Argote
- Production company: Producciones Zacarías
- Release date: 21 April 1960 (Mexico)
- Running time: 94 minutes
- Country: Mexico
- Language: Spanish

Dos locos en escena ("Two Crazy Ones on the Scene") is a 1960 Mexican comedy film produced by Mario A. Zacarías, writted by Roberto Gómez Bolaños, directed by Agustín P. Delgado and starring Viruta and Capulina, Flor Silvestre and Marina Camacho. This film marked the acting debut of Chespirito, better known mainly for play the characters of El Chavo del Ocho and El Chapulín Colorado in the 1970s.
