= La cigüeña distraída =

1966 film by Emilio Gómez Muriel

- Theatrical poster
- Directed by: Emilio Gómez Muriel
- Written by: Roberto Gómez Bolaños
- Produced by: Mario A. Zacarías
- Starring: Marco Antonio Campos; Gaspar Henaine; Alma Delia Fuentes; María Duval; Emily Cranz; Rosa María Vázquez; Fannie Kauffman «Vitola»
- Cinematography: Ezequiel Carrasco
- Edited by: José W. Bustos
- Music by: Manuel Esperón
- Production company: Estudios Churubusco
- Distributed by: Producciones Zacarías
- Release date: 22 December 1966 (Mexico)
- Running time: 88 minutes
- Country: Mexico
- Language: Spanish

La cigüeña distraída (English: The Distracted Stork) is a 1966 Mexican family and child comedy film produced by Mario A. Zacarías, written by Roberto Gómez Bolaños, directed by Emilio Gómez Muriel and starring Viruta and Capulina, Alma Delia Fuentes, María Duval, Emily Cranz, Rosa María Vázquez and Fannie Kauffman «Vitola», with the special participation of Antonio Henaine (as Capulina Jr.) and Francisco Navarrete (as Viruta Jr.). This film is the first part of a trilogy of family and child films, including Un par de roba chicos (1967) and El nano (1971). This is the only film in which Duval does not sing music themes on scene.

== Plot ==
Two different women give birth to twin brothers in a hospital, and when they are discussing outside the hospital, the fathers (Viruta and Capulina), confuse their babies when they say goodbye one another. Some years after, one of the couples is a pair of rich and well educated brothers that are meant to be married to a couple of rich sisters, Alma and Maria Castillo, while the other couple of brothers, a poor but friendly unemployed guys, fall in love with Emilia and Rosita, the maids of the rich twin brothers. When the two couples meet, confusion is ensued in all sides. After several situations that almost break the compromise of all four couples, the girls realize about the problem and make amends with the boys.

== Cast ==
- Marco Antonio Campos as Viruta Palacios / Viruta Corrales
- Gaspar Henaine as Capulina Palacios / Capulina Corrales
- Alma Delia Fuentes as María Castillo
- María Duval as Alma Castillo
- Emily Cranz as Emilia
- Rosa María Vázquez as Rosita
- Antonio Henaine as Capulina, Jr.
- Francisco Navarrete as Viruta, Jr.
- Fannie Kauffman «Vitola» as Mrs. Palacios
- Óscar Ortiz de Pinedo as Attorney Atenógeres Castillo
- Arturo Castro "Bigotón" as Attorney Arturo Castro
- Mary Ellen as Miss Offside
- Antonio Raxel as Don Antonio
- Mario García "Harapos" as The Short Thief
- Pedro de Urdimalas as Jaime
- Nathanael León as Bowler
- Gloria Chávez as The First Midwife
- Arturo Correa as Bermúdez
- Rosa Carbajal as Doña Regina
- Roy Fletcher as Journalist
- Ramón Valdés as The Skinny Thief
- Evelyn Ortiz as Mrs. Corrales
- Perla Walter as Bowler Woman
- José Jasso as Mr. Cejudo (uncredited)
- Armando Gutiérrez as Don Gelasio (uncredited)
