= The Bloody Vampire =

1962 film by Miguel Morayta

- Directed by: Miguel Morayta
- Screenplay by: Miguel Morayta
- Story by: Miguel Morayta
- Produced by: Rafael Pérez Grovas
- Starring: Begoña Palacios; Erna Martha Bauman; Raúl Farell; Bertha Moss; Carlos Agostí; Pancho Córdova; Antonio Raxel; Enrique Lucero; Lupe Carriles
- Cinematography: Raúl Martínez Solares
- Edited by: Gloria Schoemann
- Music by: Luis Hernández Bretón
- Release date: 6 September 1962 (Mexico)
- Running time: 110 minutes
- Country: Mexico
- Language: Spanish

The Bloody Vampire (Spanish: El vampiro sangriento) is a 1962 Mexican horror film written and directed by Miguel Morayta, and starring Begoña Palacios, Erna Martha Bauman, and Carlos Agostí. This film is part of a duology of vampire films directed by Morayta, followed by The Invasion of the Vampires (1963).

== Plot ==
Count Cagliostro (Antonio Raxel), whose family has tried for generations to rid the world of vampires, instructs his daughter Inés (Begoña Palacios) to confront Count Frankenhausen (Carlos Agostí) and his vampire henchmen.

== Cast ==
- Begoña Palacios as Inés Cagliostro
- Erna Martha Bauman as Countess Eugenia Frankenhausen
- Raúl Farell as Dr. Ricardo Peisser
- Bertha Moss as Frau Hildegarda
- Carlos Agostí as Count Sigfrido von Frankenhausen
- Pancho Córdova as Justus (as Francisco A. Cordova)
- Antonio Raxel as Count Valsamo de Cagliostro
- Enrique Lucero as Lázaro
- Lupe Carriles as Lupe, the innkeeper
- Nathanael León as Torture Chamber Master (uncredited)

== Reception ==
Gustavo Subero's book, Gender and Sexuality in Latin American Horror Cinema: Embodiments of Evil, highlighted the Frau Hildegarda character as a "character that best embraces monstrosity while breaking away from patriarchal society", saying that "she is depicted in many instances as more monstrous and evil than the vampire she serves", as "she is not only a helping hand for El Conde, [but] she enjoys the freedom to exercise evil without having to justify it as carrying out someone else's orders." The book credited this to her "[disavowing] the two main characteristics of the female gothic: the 'natural' physical beauty of such creatures and being a blameless victim of patriarchal oppresion". The book Hampones, pelados y pecatrices: Sujetos peligrosos de la Ciudad de México (1940–1960) reached a similar conclusion regarding the film's portrayal of the archetype of malas mujeres ("bad women").

Rogelio Agrasánchez's Cine mexicano de horror: carteles del cine fantástico mexicano, dedicated to the film posters of horror and fantasy films, complimented the film poster of this film and its sequel The Invasion of the Vampires, saying that they featured "wonderful designs in great color and workmanship".

Alexis Puig in El gran libro del vampiro gives the film 1 out of 5 estacas ("stakes"), with his review simply saying "Only for lovers of Aztec terror".
