= Norma Mora =

Mexican actress (1943–2025)

- Born: Norma Helen García Mora Starr; 30 April 1943; Mexico City, Mexico
- Died: 11 February 2025 (aged 81); Mexico City, Mexico
- Occupation: Actress

Norma Helen García Mora Starr (30 April 1943 – 11 February 2025) was a Mexican actress.

== Life and career ==
Mora was born in Mexico City on 30 April 1943, and was of Arab, Irish, and Jewish descent. In 1959, she won a beauty contest sponsored by a well known Mexican magazine. She had starring roles in the Viruta and Capulina vehicles Qué perra vida (1963), where she played an antagonist, and Los astronautas (1964), where she played Capulina's Venusian romantic interest, Rauna.

Mora died at the Casa del Actor rest home in Mexico City, on 11 February 2025, at the age of 81.
