= El Mundo de los Aviones =

- Directed by: René Cardona Jr.
- Screenplay by: René Cardona Jr. Mario A. Zacarías
- Produced by: Mario A. Zacarías
- Starring: Gaspar Henaine «Capulina» Lucy Gallardo; Bárbara Angely; Carolina Cortázar; Amedee Chabot
- Release date: 1969
- Country: Mexico

El Mundo de los Aviones is a 1969 mexican adventure comedy film produced and writted by Mario A. Zacarías, cowritted and directed by René Cardona Jr., and starring Gaspar Henaine «Capulina», Lucy Gallardo, Bárbara Angely, Carolina Cortázar and Amedee Chabot.

== Plot ==
Capulina is a pilot who is erratic at best, never being able to land his airplane correctly. However, he discovers a plot being planned in the airline industry and unites his airline friends in order to prevent it from happening.
