= Dos meseros majaderos =

- Directed by: Gilberto Martínez Solares
- Written by: Roberto Gómez Bolaños
- Starring: Marco Antonio Campos; Gaspar Henaine; Luz María Aguilar; Elsa Cárdenas
- Cinematography: Raúl Martínez Solares
- Edited by: Gloria Schoemann
- Music by: Raúl Lavista
- Production company: Producciones Zacarías
- Release date: September 9, 1966 (Mexico)
- Running time: 85 minutes
- Country: Mexico
- Language: Spanish

Dos meseros majaderos is a 1966 Mexican comedy film written by Roberto Gómez Bolaños, directed by Gilberto Martínez Solares and starring Viruta and Capulina, Luz María Aguilar and Elsa Cárdenas, with the special participation de Ana María de Panamá.
