= El tuerto Angustias =

1974 Mexican Western film

- Directed by: José Delfos
- Written by: José Delfos
- Produced by: Adan Guillen Paz; Juan Manuel Herrera
- Starring: Sonia Furió; Julián Bravo; Leonardo Morán
- Edited by: Ángel Camacho
- Music by: Ernesto Cortázar II
- Production companies: Cineteca Guatemala; Víctor Films S.A.
- Distributed by: Mexcinema Video Corp.
- Release date: 1974 (Mexico)
- Running time: 85 minutes
- Country: Mexico
- Language: Spanish

El tuerto Angustias (English: "The One-Eyed Angustias") is a 1974 Mexican Western drama film directed by José Delfos and starring Sonia Furió, Julián Bravo and Leonardo Morán. It was filmed in Guatemala.

== Plot ==
Rosaura Ventura (Furió) is a rich woman who hires death row inmates to work in her mercury mine. She has Sebastián "El Tuerto" ("The One-Eyed One") Angustias as her right-hand man, a man who earned his nickname when, to defend a showgirl in a low-end cabaret, he was left one-eyed. One day, after some Indians are forced to carry cinnabar from Rosaura's mine, the young Indian Santos (Bravo) is insolent and then subservient to Rosaura, and she spares his life when he steals a cow after he cuts the tongue of a disobedient lieutenant, so the boy wins Rosaura's trust. Rosaura then charges El Tuerto to discover who makes the condemned disappear. He discovers that Santos secretly is the leader of the condemned, and kills him when Rosaura celebrates his birthday.

== Cast ==
- Sonia Furió as Rosaura Ventura
- Julián Bravo as Santos
- Leonardo Morán
- Antonio Raxel

== Bibliography ==
- Amador, María Luisa; Ayala Blanco, Jorge. Cartelera cinematográfica, 1980-1989. UNAM, 2006.
- López García, Pedro. Alicantinos en el cine. Cineastas en Alicante. Editorial Club Universitario, 2013.
- Tapia Campos, Martha Laura; Aguilar Plata, Blanca. La violencia nuestra de cada día. Print to e-book, 2014.
