= Baby Bell (actress) =

Argentine-born Mexican actress and singer

María Isabel Gómez Bell (January 26, 1943 – 2000), known as Baby Bell, was an Argentine-born Mexican actress and singer. She was specialized in the genre of child music. She was perhaps best known for starring in the film Cada quién su lucha (1966), with Viruta and Capulina.

== Filmography ==
=== Film ===
- (1964) Las hijas de Elena
- (1965) El último cartucho
- (1965) Millonario a go go
- (1966) Cada quién su lucha

=== Television ===
- (1985) Las amazonas (TV series)
