= Celia Viveros =

Mexican actress (1925–1979)

- Born: 13 August 1925; Mexico City, Mexico
- Died: 21 November 1979 (aged 54); Mexico City, Mexico
- Occupation: Actor
- Years active: 1949-1978 (film)

Celia Viveros (1925–1979) was a Mexican film actress.

== Selected filmography ==
- In the Flesh (1951)
- Women of the Theatre (1951)
- A Galician Dances the Mambo (1951)
- Sacrificed Women (1952)
- The Night Is Ours (1952)
- I Want to Live (1953)
- The Life of Agustín Lara (1959)
- El dolor de pagar la renta (1960)
- A Faithful Soldier of Pancho Villa (1967)

== Bibliography ==
- Pitts, Michael R. Western Movies: A Guide to 5,105 Feature Films. McFarland, 2012.
