= Los astronautas =

1964 film

- Theatrical release lobby card
- Directed by: Miguel Zacarías
- Screenplay by: Miguel Zacarías
- Story by: Roberto Gómez Bolaños
- Produced by: Mario A. Zacarías
- Starring: Marco Antonio Campos; Gaspar Henaine; Gina Romand; Norma Mora; Erna Martha Bauman
- Cinematography: Manuel Gómez Urquiza
- Edited by: José W. Bustos
- Music by: Gustavo César Carrión
- Production company: Estudios Churubusco
- Distributed by: Producciones Zacarías
- Release date: 12 March 1964 (Mexico City)
- Running time: 85 minutes
- Country: Mexico
- Language: Spanish

Los astronautas (English: The Astronauts) is a 1964 Mexican comic science fiction film, produced by Mario A. Zacarías, writted by Roberto Gómez Bolaños, directed by Miguel Zacarías and starring Viruta y Capulina, Gina Romand, Norma Mora and Erna Martha Bauman.

== Plot ==
In the women-ruled planet of Venus, the Union Leader of the Oppressed Husbands Syndicate wants to revert the power of leadership back to the men and threatens to initiate a strike if his will is not heard. However, the female leader of Venus believes otherwise and asserts that male dominion will only cause war and disruption. Therefore, she sends Lieutenant Laúr and Sergeant Rauna on a mission to choose two male earthlings who can prove to be more useful than Venusian men, so that they can bring more of them to Venus. When Laúr and Rauna choose Viruta and Capulina, two amateur singers who work in a gymnasium, they are intercepted by their constant rivals the Martians who claim that Earth is a satellite of Mars and therefore it should not be intruded by Venusians. Capulina manages to steal a super-power locket from a Martian which allows him to scare them off. He and Viruta later marry the Venusian women Laur and Rauna and then travel to the Moon for their honeymoon.

== Cast ==
- Marco Antonio Campos as Viruta
- Gaspar Henaine as Capulina
- Gina Romand as Laúr, Lieutenant X7
- Norma Mora as Rauna, Sergeant X8
- Erna Martha Bauman as Female Leader of Venus
- Antonio Raxel as Gymnasium Manager
- Armando Sáenz as Lombard, Union Leader of the Oppressed Husbands Syndicate
- Tito Novaro as Martian
- Jorge Casanova as Gymnasium Orator

== Production ==
The film was shot from 1 to 2 November 1960, in Estudios Churubusco. The film's working titles were Turistas interplanetarios and Dos viajeros del espacio.

== See also ==
- List of films featuring extraterrestrials
