= Se los chupó la bruja =

- Theatrical release lobby card
- Directed by: Jaime Salvador
- Written by: Ramón Pérez Peláez
- Story by: Pedro Galindo; Pedro de Urdimalas
- Produced by: Pedro Galindo
- Starring: Marco Antonio Campos "Viruta; Gaspar Henaine "Capulina"; Sonia Furió
- Cinematography: Ezequiel Carrasco
- Edited by: Jorge Bustos
- Music by: José de la Vega
- Production company: Filmadora Chapultepec
- Distributed by: Películas Nacionales
- Release date: 26 February 1958 (Mexico)
- Running time: 85 minutes
- Country: Mexico
- Language: Spanish

Se los chupó la bruja ("The Witch Suckled Them") is a 1958 Mexican horror comedy film, produced and written by Pedro Galindo, directed by Jaime Salvador and starring Viruta and Capulina and Sonia Furió.

== Plot ==
Viruta and Capulina are two brothers who are trying to invent a system in which water works as a substitute for gas for vehicles. Don Caritino, their landlord, has tried to get their fourteen-month due rent. Viruta and Capulina refuse to pay their due rent, so Don Caritino proposes them to convince their goddaughter Gloria to date him. In return, he will let them forget about the rent.

Viruta and Capulina are surprised when they are told they have inherited, along with their cousin Reynaldo, their great uncle's monetary estate and mansion in "El callejón de las ánimas". There is a hidden treasure in the mansion that their great uncle tried to find. The mansion's butler and his wife, are urgingly tying to find the treasure. The couple scares Viruta, Capulina, Gloria, and Reynaldo out of the mansion, so that their plan they can go on with their searching.

Their luck turns around when Reynaldo calls the sheriff to arrest the butler and his wife. Viruta and Capulina show their water energy invention to the sheriff in the butler's car, but the butler had poured gasoline into the gas compartment a few moments before. So Capulina lights a match and pours it in, and an explosion occurs.

The explosion cracked a column where the treasure was hidden, Viruta and Capulina found the treasure and gives some to the sheriff. Reynaldo's greatest treasure is Gloria (Viruta and Capulina's goddaughter), who has developed a romantic relationship with him.

== Cast ==
- Marco Antonio Campos as Viruta
- Gaspar Henaine as Capulina
- Sonia Furió as Gloria
- Octávio Arias as Reynaldo
- Yerye Beirute as the Superintendent
- José Jasso "El Ojón" as the Butler
- Armando Arriola as don Caritino
- Lupe Carriles as the Housekeeper
- Felipe de Flores as Policeman
- Armando Espinosa as Policeman
- Mario García "Harapos" as the Superintendent's secretary
- Elia Mendéz as Gloria's personal assistant
- Los Tres Caballeros as the musical trio of the Cisne Negro club
- Alberto Catalá as Lawyer Bermejo (uncredited)

== Reception ==
Production started and ended in 1957, and the film premiered in the Palacio Chino movie theater on February 26, 1958.

== DVD release and restoration ==
Under the production of Tekila Films, the film was digitally remastered in sound and picture quality for exclusive release in DVD in 2008. Se los chupó la bruja was released in an eight-film four-disc pack entitled, "8 Exitasos de la Comedia". It was also released by itself in a one-disc DVD.
