= Begoña Palacios =

Mexican television and film actress

- Born: María Begoña Palacios Ríos; 28 December 1941; Mexico City, Mexico
- Died: 1 March 2000 (aged 58); Mexico City, Mexico
- Occupation: Actress
- Years active: 1959–1997
- Spouse: Sam Peckinpah (1964–1967; 1974–1984)

María Begoña Palacios Ríos (28 December 1941 – 1 March 2000) was a Mexican film and television actress.

She became known for participating in several Mexican films in the 1960s, such as Rosa Blanca (1961) and El tejedor de milagros (1962), the latter with Pedro Armendáriz. She later worked on some soap operas, the last of which was La chacala, her final acting role.

Outside her native Mexico, she is arguably best known for having married American film director Sam Peckinpah. They married in 1965, after Palacios had a minor role in Peckinpah's film Major Dundee that same year. A stormy relationship developed, and over the years they would go on to marry, divorce and remarry. They had one daughter together, Maria Guadalupe "Lupita" Peckinpah (b 1973).

On 1 March 2000, she died in Mexico City of hepatitis C. According to the wishes of her daughter, her remains were transferred to Malibu, California.

== Selected filmography ==
- The White Renegade (1960)
- Rosa Blanca (1961)
- El tejedor de milagros (1962)
- The Bloody Vampire (1962)
- Cita con la muerte (1963)
- Major Dundee (1965)
- Fiebre de juventud (1966)

== Bibliography ==
- Simmons, Garner (1982). Peckinpah, A Portrait in Montage. University of Texas Press. ISBN 0-292-76493-6.
