= José Jasso =

Mexican actor

José Jasso (3 July 1911 – 25 April 1968) was a Mexican actor and comedian best known for his large, bulging eyes which earned him the nickname "El Ojón". He was mostly cast in comic supporting roles from 1945 to 1967.

== Selected filmography ==
- Madman and Vagabond (1946)
- El rey del barrio (1949)
- The Guests of the Marquesa (1951)
- You Had To Be a Gypsy (1953)
- Mi adorada Clementina (1953)
- The Seven Girls (1955)
- Barefoot Sultan (1956)
- Se los chupó la bruja (1958)
- De tal palo tal astilla (1960)
- Two Cheap Husbands (1960)
- Pegando con tubo (1961)
- Ruletero a toda marcha (1962)
- El rey del tomate (1963)
- La cigüeña distraída (1966)
