= Carlos Agostí =

Spanish-born Mexican film actor (1922–2002)

- Born: July 3, 1922; Madrid, Spain
- Died: December 13, 2002 (aged 80); Los Angeles, California, U.S.
- Years active: 1944-1995

Carlos Agostí (July 3, 1922 – December 13, 2002) was a Spanish-born Mexican film actor.

== Biography ==
After an important career in his native country that began in 1944, Agosti moved to Mexico in the 1950s and made numerous appearances in the 1980s, often playing cunning villains. He was popular for his portrayal of the sinister vampire Count Frankenhausen in The Bloody Vampire (1962) and The Invasion of the Vampires (1963).

== Selected filmography ==
- When the Angels Sleep (1947)
- The Drummer of Bruch (1948)
- In a Corner of Spain (1949)
- Don Juan (1950)
- Malibran's Song (1951)
- Sister Alegría (1952)
- The Hidden One (1955)
- Dos Corazones y un Cielo (1958)
- Sube y baja (1959)
- The Illiterate One (1961)
- The Bloody Vampire (1962)
- The Invasion of the Vampires (1963)
- La Valentina (1966)
- Juan Pistolas (1966)
- The Garden of Aunt Isabel (1971)
- 41, el hombre perfecto (1982)
