= El rey del tomate =

1964 film by Miguel M. Delgado

El rey del tomate ("The Tomato King") is a 1964 Mexican comedy-drama film, directed by Miguel M. Delgado and starring Eulalio González «Piporro», Luz Márquez and Emma Roldán, with the special participation of María Elena Velasco performing in uncredited roles.

== Cast ==
- Eulalio González «Piporro» ... Librado Cantu Escamilla (as Lalo Gonzalez Piporro)
- Luz Márquez ... Silvia
- Emma Roldán ... Tía Mila
- Alfredo Wally Barrón ... El Toro - bandido (as Alfredo Walli Barrón)
- José Jasso «El Ojón» ... Chema
- Antonio Bravo ... Don Cosme
- Lucila González ... Domitila
- José Chávez ... Bandido
- Luis Lomeli ... Enrique
- Antonio Haro Oliva
- Julián de Meriche ... Cantinero
- Carlos Guarneros ... Cantante (as Carlos Guarneros 'Cuco')

Rest of cast listed alphabetically

- Lupe Carriles ... Esposa de Chema (uncredited)
- Arturo Castro «Bigotón» ... Ranchero (uncredited)
- María Elena Velasco ... Clienta de Librado (uncredited)
