= Comedians and Songs =

1960 film

- Directed by: Fernando Cortés
- Written by: Fernando Galiana
- Starring: Marco Antonio Campos; Gaspar Henaine; Silvia Fournier; María Eugenia San Martín
- Cinematography: José Ortiz Ramos
- Edited by: Alfredo Rosas Priego
- Music by: Gustavo César Carrión
- Production company: Alameda Films
- Distributed by: Alameda Films
- Release date: 20 October 1960
- Running time: 85 minutes
- Country: Mexico
- Language: Spanish

Comedians and Songs (Spanish: Cómicos y canciones) is a 1960 Mexican comedy crime film directed by Fernando Cortés and starring Viruta and Capulina, Silvia Fournier and María Eugenia San Martín.

== Cast ==
- Marco Antonio Campos as Viruta
- Gaspar Henaine as Capulina
- Silvia Fournier as Lilia
- María Eugenia San Martín as Carmen
- Jaime Fernández as El Charrascas
- Pedro de Aguillón as Mister Fong
- Rosa Cué
- Arturo Castro «Bigotón» as Don Luis, El Jefe
- José Chávez
- Julián de Meriche
- Ernesto Finance as El Comandante
- Guillermo Hernández

== Bibliography ==
- Emilio García Riera. Historia documental del cine mexicano: 1959-1960. Universidad de Guadalajara, 1994.
