= El padrecito =

- DVD cover
- Directed by: Miguel M. Delgado
- Written by: Mario Amendola; Renée Asseo
- Produced by: Jacques Gelman
- Starring: Mario Moreno «Cantinflas» Rosa María Vázquez; Ángel Garasa; Angelines Fernández
- Cinematography: Luis Cuadrado
- Music by: Raúl Lavista
- Distributed by: Columbia Pictures
- Release date: 3 September 1964 (Mexico)
- Running time: 124 minutes
- Language: Spanish

El padrecito (transl. "The Little Priest") is a 1964 Mexican comedy film directed by Miguel M. Delgado. It stars Mario Moreno ("Cantinflas"), Rosa María Vázquez, Ángel Garasa, and Angelines Fernández.

== Plot ==
When an elderly priest, Father Damián receives word that he will be replaced by a younger priest, he states his dread at leaving the parish refuses to accept his arrival, though he relents. Coming to replace him is the young priest Father Sebastián (played by Cantinflas) who is assigned to the parish in San Jerónimo el Alto, where the town is indifferent to his arrival. Everyone around him gives him the cold shoulder, including Father Damián (played by Ángel Garasa), and particularly Damián's sister, Sara. The only resident to instantly warm up to him is Sara's daughter Susana. Added to the woes are the forthcoming enmity from the town's cacique Don Silvestre and his son Marcos.

Father Sebastián is at first struggling to adapt to the environment, but eventually his unconventional counsels begin to win over the townspeople, lecturing them on their duties in a modern society. Despite his unorthodox ways he manages to stay true to his Catholic ideals. Sometimes his actions are somewhat questionable, as when he refuses to baptize a child under a name that sounded too ugly, and by facing Marcos in a somewhat violent fashion. Still, other times his actions are noble, such as when he used the collection plate to redistribute the town's wealth more evenly. When accused of spreading communism, he quotes the 1891 socially conscious encyclical Rerum novarum. He even ventures into politics, with a veiled attack on the municipal president couched into a sermon. Eventually, he brokers an irregular deal with Don Silvestre for some concessions for the poor of his parish.

When the overseeing bishop Juan José Romero arrives to confirm Father Sebastián's place in the parish, Father Sebastián pretends to have even more radical ideas for the church. Considering them too ludicrous Romero allows Father Damián to remain. In leaving, Father Sebastián gets the farewell crowd in a ten-fold, with the bishop revealing that Sebastián's tricks were not really what made him allow Father Damián to remain, but Father Sebastián's infuse of energy and determination.

== Cast ==
- Mario Moreno «Cantinflas» as Padre Sebastián
- Ángel Garasa as Padre Damián
- Rosa María Vázquez as Susana
- José Elías Moreno as Don Silvestre
- Angelines Fernández as Sara
- Rogelio Guerra as Marcos
- Florencio Castelló as Don Nicanor
- Jorge Russek as Matías
- Arturo Castro as Nepomuceno
- Gerardo del Castillo as Womanizer
- Armando Gutiérrez as Municipal President
- José Luis Moreno as Young Man (as Jose L. Moreno Lopez)
- Alfonso Torres as Don Felipe (as Alfonso Torres Macias)
- Mary Montiel as Young Man's Girlfriend
- Alberto Catalá as Druggist
- Elodia Hernández as Village Woman
- Alberto Galán as Padre Juan José Romero
- Cecilia Leger as Village Woman
- René Barrera as Villano
- Queta Carrasco as Neighbor
- Marcelo López Linares (uncredited)

== Reception ==
Critics generally viewed the film as typical of the later Cantinflas films, a moralizing feature slim on originality. However, some found the religious themes indicative of the spirit of Latin American Catholicism. Pope John XXIII called the Second Vatican Council only two years earlier, and Cantinflas seemed to be embracing the reforms it espoused as the remedy for Mexico's poverty.

Some accused Cantinflas of mocking the faith and the priesthood, but he assured his audience that his "message would be only positive, constructive, happy, human, Christian." The Latin American contingent of seminarians in Rome apparently shared his assessment, and wrote him a grateful letter.

Some Cantinflas biographers, however, saw political overtones in the film. The book Filmhistoria claims that in the film Cantinflas implicitly helped Mexico's then-ruling party, the Institutional Revolutionary Party (PRI), stating that when the PRI was "threatened by the growing numbers of impoverished Mexicans", Cantinflas "intervened in the current social debate through his film", noting that, while his character was initially presented "in the reformist spirit of the Second Vatican Council", in the end he "gives his approval to closed-door political machinations, winning concessions from the boss [Don Silvestre] by cutting a deck of cards, rather than by leading the people to liberate themselves." In Looking for Mexico: Modern Visual Culture and National Identity, John Mraz stated that "under the guise of being nonideological", in the film Cantinflas "openly encouraged an antipolitical solution to Mexico's problems, suggesting [...] that entering into politics is a cardinal sin."

== Bibliography ==
- García Riera, Emilio. Historia documental del cine mexicano: 1964. Ediciones Era, 1969.
- Filmhistoria. Volume 9. Promociones y Publicaciones Universitarias, 1999.
- Mraz, John. Looking for Mexico: Modern Visual Culture and National Identity. Duke University Press, 2009.
