= La odalisca No. 13 =

- Directed by: Fernando Cortés
- Written by: Fernando Cortés; Carlos Sampelayo
- Produced by: Miguel Zacarías
- Starring: Marco Antonio Campos "Viruta"; Gaspar Henaine "Capulina"; Germán Valdés "Tin-Tan"; María Antonieta Pons; Lorena Velázquez; Donna Behar
- Cinematography: Alex Phillips
- Edited by: José W. Bustos
- Music by: Manuel Esperón
- Production company: Producciones Zacarías
- Release date: 23 October 1958
- Running time: 90 minutes
- Country: Mexico
- Language: Spanish

La odalisca No. 13 ("Odalisque Number 13") is a 1958 Mexican comedy film written and directed by Fernando Cortés and starring Viruta and Capulina, Germán Valdés "Tin-Tan", María Antonieta Pons, Lorena Velázquez and Donna Behar. It is the sequel to Tin-Tan's film of the same year, A Thousand and One Nights, which also featured Pons.

The film was said to be "not only a very popular Mexican movie but also a complex parody that involved Mexico City's turn-of-the-century modernist fascination with odalisques".
