= Rosa María Vázquez =

Mexican actress of film and television (born 1943)

- Born: Rosa María Vázquez Bustamantes; 5 August 1943 (age 83); Tulancingo, Hidalgo, Mexico
- Other name: Antonia Daneem
- Occupation: Actress
- Spouse: José Ortiz Ávila (m. 1973; died 2002)
- Children: 3

Rosa María Vázquez Bustamante (born 5 August 1943) is a Mexican actress.

== Career ==
A native of Tulancingo, Hidalgo, she made her film debut at the age of six in Emilio Fernández's The Torch (1950) starring Paulette Goddard and Pedro Armendáriz. She studied acting for three years at the National Association of Actors' Film Academy of Radio and Television, and was given her first starring role opposite Cantinflas in El padrecito (1964), her most famous film.

== Selected filmography ==
- The Torch (1950) (credited as Antonia Daneem)
- El padrecito (1964)
- La cigüeña distraída (1966)
