= Sonia Furió =

Mexican actress (1937–1996)

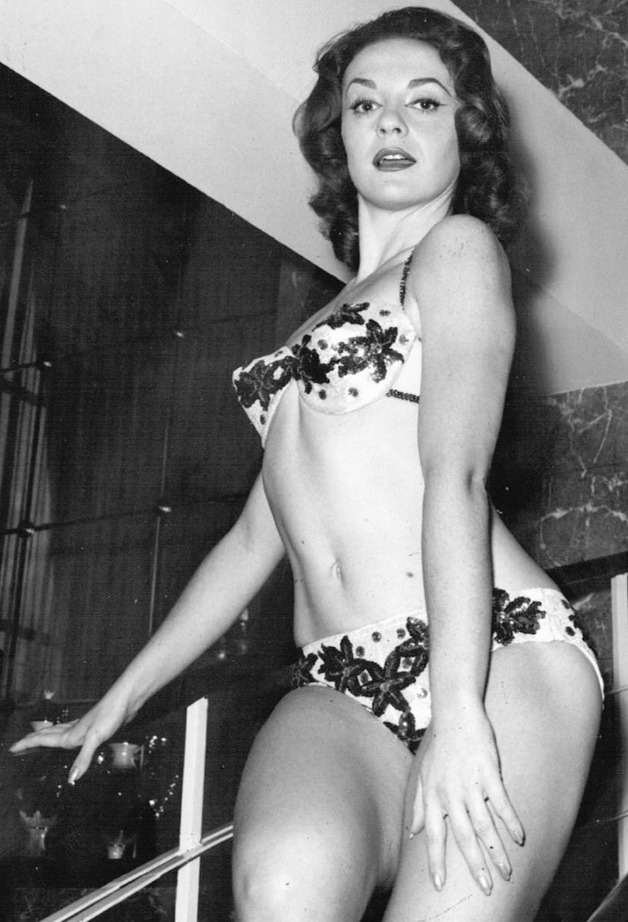
- Sonia Furió in 1957
- Born: María Sonia Furió Flores; 30 July 1937; Alicante, Second Spanish Republic
- Died: 1 December 1996 (aged 59); Mexico City, Mexico
- Occupations: Actress and singer

María Sonia Furió Flores (30 July 1937 – 1 December 1996), known as Sonia Furió, was a Spanish-Mexican actress and singer, specialized in the musical genre of bolero. She became most for starring films alongside the comedian actor Germán Valdés "Tin-Tan".

== Early life ==
Furió was born in Alicante, the daughter of Nicolás Furió Cabanés and María Flores Guillén. She was very young when her family emigrated to Mexico because of the Spanish Civil War and became a naturalized Mexican citizen on 2 May 1952.

== Career ==
Furió's debut was in the film Y mañana serán mujeres (1955). She studied modern and folkloric dance, English, French, painting, and sculpture. She completed her studies in stagecraft at the Academia de Andrés Soler. She won a golden medal from the Asociación Israelita for her role in the film Los desarraigados (1960). For her work in La cárcel de Cananea (1960), she received a trophy from the Asociación de Críticos Mexicanos.

== Filmography ==
- Se los chupó la bruja (1958)
- Vacations in Acapulco (1961)
- El tuerto Angustias (1974)
