= Viruta y Capulina =

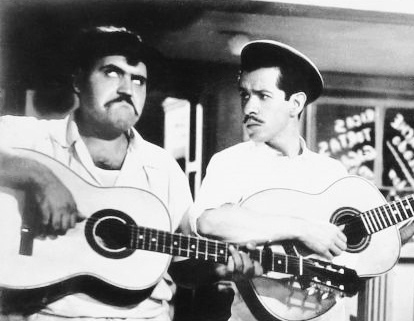
Gaspar Henaine (Capulina) and Marco Antonio Campos (Viruta)

Viruta y Capulina (English: Viruta and Capulina), performed by Marco Antonio Campos and Gaspar Henaine, were a Mexican double act featured in film, television, theatre, radio, and comic books from 1957 to 1967.

== Career ==
Roberto Gómez Bolaños was the writer of their television program, Cómicos y canciones, and also wrote or co-wrote 24 of their films. Gómez Bolaños later remembered, "When I met [Viruta], he had just gone through a crisis of alcoholism and they had told him that he would die in a couple of weeks. We worked together for nearly 17 years and he never tasted a drop of alcohol, but he could never quit smoking."

Viruta and Capulina's first feature film, Se los chupó la bruja, was shot in 1957 and released the following year by Películas Nacionales. Upon viewing the film for the first time during a private screening, Capulina said that he felt "desolate" and told his wife that he would "never again work in film." However, the film was screened for eight weeks and became a box-office hit.

Five of their films were shot in color: La odalisca No. 13, Cascabelito, Barridos y regados, Buenos días, Acapulco, and Dos pintores pintorescos.

By 1962, the films of Viruta and Capulina were often associated with "bad quality" films and television programs. In response, Capulina said that he and Viruta never had "the slightest freedom to choose stories." Viruta went on to write the stories of two of their films, Cascabelito (1962) and Los reyes del volante (1965).

Viruta and Capulina starred in 34 films. They made cameo appearances (actuaciones especiales in Spanish) in two films: Viaje a la luna (1958), a comedy starring Kitty de Hoyos and Corona and Arau (another comedy duo), and La vida de Pedro Infante (1966), a Pedro Infante biopic. They appeared in a total of 36 films, including the two cameos. Jaime Salvador directed the duo's first film and eight more, Agustín P. Delgado also directed nine, Gilberto Martínez Solares directed four, Fernando Cortés directed three and one cameo, Miguel Morayta directed three, father and son René Cardona and René Cardona Jr. directed two each, and Miguel Zacarías directed one and the final cameo.

== Films ==
Year	Title	Production company	Director	Writer(s)
1957	La sombra del otro	Producciones Dyana	Gilberto Martínez Solares	Francisco Javier Camargo (based on his radio series); Fernando de Fuentes (film adaptation); María Luisa Algarra and Josefina Vicens (additional dialogue)
1958	Se los chupó la bruja	Filmadora Chapultepec	Jaime Salvador	Pedro de Urdimalas and Pedro Galindo (original story); Ramón Pérez P. and Pedro de Urdimalas (film adaptation); Jaime Salvador (screenplay)
1958	Viaje a la luna	Brooks y Enríquez	Fernando Cortés	Fernando Galiana and Fernando Cortes (story); Carlos Sampelayo (adaptation)
1958	Los legionarios	Producciones Zacarías	Agustín P. Delgado	Roberto Gómez Bolaños (original story); Agustín P. Delgado (film adaptation)
1958	La odalisca No. 13	Producciones Zacarías	Fernando Cortés	Carlos Sampelayo (story); Fernando Cortés (adaptation)
1958	Muertos de miedo	Filmadora Chapultepec	Jaime Salvador	Pedro de Urdimalas and Pedro Galindo, Jr. (original story); Eduardo Galindo (adaptation)
1958	A sablazo limpio	Brooks y Enríquez	Fernando Cortés	Fernando and José Luis Galiana (story); Fernando Cortes and Carlos Sampelayo (adaptation)
1959	Angelitos del trapecio	Producciones Zacarías	Agustín P. Delgado	Roberto Gómez Bolaños (original story); Agustín P. Delgado (adaptation)
1960	Los tigres del desierto	Producciones Zacarías	Agustín P. Delgado	Roberto Gómez Bolaños (original story); Agustín P. Delgado (adaptation)
1960	Dos locos en escena	Producciones Zacarías	Agustín P. Delgado	Roberto Gómez Bolaños (story and dialogue); Agustín P. Delgado (film adaptation)
1960	Dos criados malcriados	Producciones Zacarías	Agustín P. Delgado	Roberto Gómez Bolaños (original story); Agustín P. Delgado (adaptation)
1960	El dolor de pagar la renta	Producciones Zacarías	Agustín P. Delgado	Roberto Gómez Bolanos (story and dialogue); Agustín P. Delgado (film adaptation)
1960	Cómicos y canciones	Alameda Films	Fernando Cortés	Fernando Galiana (story); Fernando Galiana and Fernando Cortés (adaptation)
1960	Los desenfrenados	Producciones Zacarías	Agustín P. Delgado	Roberto Gómez Bolaños (original story); Agustín P. Delgado (adaptation)
1961	Limosneros con garrote	Filmadora Chapultepec	Jaime Salvador	Pedro de Urdimalas and Roberto Gómez Bolaños (story); Jaime Salvador (adaptation)
1961	Un par... a todo dar	Filmadora Chapultepec	Jaime Salvador	Roberto Gómez Bolaños (story); Jaime Salvador (adaptation)
1961	Pegando con tubo	Filmadora Chapultepec	Jaime Salvador	Pedro de Urdimalas and Roberto Gómez Bolaños (story); Jaime Salvador (adaptation)
1961	Dos tontos y un loco	Filmadora Chapultepec	Miguel Morayta	Roberto Gómez Bolaños (story); Miguel Morayta (adaptation)
1962	Qué perra vida	Filmadora Chapultepec	Jaime Salvador	Jaime Salvador (story and adaptation)
1962	Cascabelito	Filmadora Chapultepec	Jaime Salvador	Marco Antonio Campos (story); Jaime Salvador (adaptation)
1962	En peligro de muerte	Producciones Zacarías	René Cardona	Alfredo Zacarías (story and adaptation); Roberto Gómez Bolaños (comedic collaboration)
1963	Los invisibles	Filmadora Chapultepec	Jaime Salvador	Roberto Gómez Bolaños (story and adaptation)
1963	Barridos y regados	Filmadora Chapultepec	Jaime Salvador	Tito Davison (story); Jaime Salvador (adaptation)
1964	Buenos días, Acapulco	Producciones Zacarías	Agustín P. Delgado	Roberto Gómez Bolaños (story and adaptation)
1964	Los astronautas	Producciones Zacarías	Miguel Zacarías	Roberto Gómez Bolaños (story); Miguel Zacarías (screenplay)
1964	La edad de piedra	Producciones Zacarías	René Cardona	Alfredo Zacarías (story and film comedy)
1965	Los reyes del volante	Producciones Zacarías	Miguel Morayta	Marco Antonio Campos (story); Roberto Gómez Bolaños (film comedy)
1966	La vida de Pedro Infante	Producciones Zacarías	Miguel Zacarías	Miguel Zacarías (film drama)
1966	Cada quién su lucha	Producciones Zacarías	Gilberto Martínez Solares	Alfredo Zacarías (story); Roberto Gómez Bolaños (film comedy)
1966	Dos meseros majaderos	Producciones Zacarías	Gilberto Martínez Solares	Roberto Gómez Bolaños (story and film comedy)
1966	La batalla de los pasteles	Producciones Zacarías	Agustín P. Delgado	Roberto Gómez Bolaños (story and film drama)
1966	La cigüeña distraída	Producciones Zacarías	Emilio Gómez Muriel	Roberto Gómez Bolaños (story and film comedy)
1967	Detectives o ladrones..?	Atenea Films	Miguel Morayta	Roberto Gómez Bolaños (story and film drama)
1967	Dos pintores pintorescos	Producciones Zacarías	René Cardona Jr.	Alfredo Zacarías (story); Roberto Gómez Bolaños (film comedy)
1967	Un par de robachicos	Producciones Zacarías	René Cardona Jr.	Roberto Gómez Bolaños (story and film comedy)
1967	El camino de los espantos	Producciones Zacarías	Gilberto Martínez Solares	Roberto Gómez Bolaños (story and film comedy)
