= Gaspar Henaine =

Mexican comedian and actor

Gaspar Henaine (Capulina)
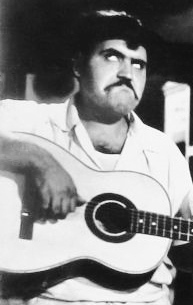
- Gaspar Henaine «Capulina» in La sombra del otro (1957).
- Born: Gaspar Henaine y Pérez de León; 6 January 1927; Chignahuapan, Puebla, Mexico
- Died: 30 September 2011 (aged 84); Mexico City, Mexico
- Other name: Capulina
- Spouse(s): María Elena Frías (married 1949–2011)

Comedy career
- Years active: 1943–1999
- Medium: Film, television, theatre, music
- Genres: Double act, slapstick

Gaspar Henaine (6 January 1927 – 30 September 2011), more commonly known by his pseudonym Capulina, was a Mexican comedian, actor, singer, film producer, and screenwriter. He was best known for partnering with Marco Antonio Campos as the double act Viruta and Capulina and for his subsequent solo career. He was later given the nickname "El Rey del Humorismo Blanco" (The King of White Humor), due to his clean, innocent style of comedy.

== Early life ==
Capulina was born in Chignahuapan, Puebla, the son of Antonio Henaine Helú, a Lebanese businessman, and Concepción Pérez de León (c. 1893 – 27 February 1983), who was also born in Chignahuapan. He and his family later moved to Mexico City. At age 10, he made his acting debut with a small part in Fernando de Fuentes' Allá en el rancho grande (1936). He studied acting and later won the "best dramatic child actor" award bestowed by the academy he attended. He started his musical career as one of the vocalists of the quartet Los Excéntricos del Ritmo. Later, in 1946, he formed part of the trio Los Trincas. The trio was hugely successful and toured Mexico and some cities of the United States.

== Career ==
=== Viruta and Capulina ===
Capulina became famous across Latin America alongside his longtime professional partner, Marco Antonio Campos, as Viruta and Capulina. In 1951, they started filming together. The two comedians made 26 films. At first they imitated the comedy style of Laurel and Hardy, thanks to their physical resemblance to them. With time they developed their own characteristic comedy style. The main difference with Laurel and Hardy is that Viruta, the thin character, was also the intelligent and aggressive one, while Capulina, the portly character, was the fool and cowardly one.

In the peak of their popularity they had a television program called Cómicos y canciones, where they alternated with other comedians and singers. Some of their sketches were written by a then unknown Roberto Gomez Bolaños who later gained legendary fame as comedian Chespirito.

Many rumors surfaced when the two co-workers stopped making films together; some suggested that Viruta felt underpaid, but Capulina attributed the separation to a feud between the two caused by lack of film jobs towards the end of their working relationship. Although he admitted that both he and Viruta felt some animosity against each other during their last six films together, Capulina also felt deep sorrow when Viruta died. A sufferer of three previous heart attacks, Viruta died after his fourth heart attack.

=== Later career ===
Capulina made a total of 84 movies, 58 of them after separating from Viruta. He also has recorded 12 music albums. One of his most famous films was Santo contra Capulina (1969), where he co-starred with Mexican wrestling legend El Santo.

Most of the films where he starred shared the same theme, to generate an adventure based on Capulina getting in trouble due to a specific issue, added with his position as an incompetent and foolish person. For example, in El mundo de los aviones (1969), Capulina is a pilot that always fails to land his plane correctly, hitting some wall and encrusting a partner in the process. He is involved in an international fraud and he teams with his airline partners to prevent the robbery, not without several funny problems.

He went from being the same character in different situations and who confronts different kind of enemies like robbers, gangs, spies, and also vampires, monsters, and mummies, with the aid of adventurers, wrestlers (like El Santo) or unexpected powers.

The character of Capulina gained huge popularity and a very successful comic book series -with stories by comic artist Oscar González Guerrero and art by his son Oscar Gonzalez Loyo- was published in the seventies and early eighties.

Capulina's last film was Mi compadre Capulina (1989). He also made a television series, Las aventuras de Capulina (1989), where he struggled in different adventures with the help of wrestler Tinieblas and sidekick Alushe.

His telenovela debut in El diario de Daniela (1996) was also his last appearance.

Capulina was also a theatrical actor and stand-up comedian. He toured with his act until 1997, when he retired, claiming that he was feeling too old to go on.

== Death ==
Capulina died of complications with pneumonia and a gastric ulcer on 30 September 2011.

== Selected filmography ==
Year	Film	Role	Notes
1943	Another Dawn		
1950	When the Night Ends		as Los Trincas
1953	Ahí vienen los gorrones		
1957	La sombra del otro	Capulina	First Viruta and Capulina's film
1958	Se los chupó la bruja	Capulina	
1958	Viaje a la luna	Fireman	
1958	Los legionarios	Legionario Capulina	
1958	La odalisca No. 13	Emir Ali Kaido	
1958	Muertos de miedo	Capulina	
1958	A sablazo limpio	Crispín Capulina	
1959	Angelitos del trapecio	Capulina	
1960	Los tigres del desierto	Capulina	
1960	Dos locos en escena	Capulina	
1960	Dos criados malcriados	Capulina	
1960	El dolor de pagar la renta	Capulina	
1960	Cómicos y canciones	Capulina	
1960	Los desenfrenados	Capulina	
1961	Limosneros con garrote	Capulina	
1961	Un par... a todo dar	Capulina	
1961	Pegando con tubo	Teniente Capulina	
1961	Dos tontos y un loco	Capulina	
1962	Qué perra vida	Capulina	
1962	Cascabelito	Capulina	
1962	¡En peligro de muerte!	Capulina Pérez y Pérez de la Barca	
1963	Los invisibles	Caoulina	
1963	Barridos y regados	Capulina	
1964	Buenos días, Acapulco	Capulina	
1964	Los astronautas	Capulina	
1964	La edad de piedra	Capulina	
1965	Los reyes del volante	Capulina	
1966	La vida de Pedro Infante	Capulina	
1966	Cada quién su lucha	Capulina	
1966	Dos meseros majaderos	Capulina	
1966	La batalla de los pasteles	Capulina	
1966	La cigüeña distraída	Capulina Palacios / Capulina Corrales	
1967	Detectives o ladrones..?	Capulina	
1967	Dos pintores pintorescos	Capulina	
1967	Un par de robachicos	Capulina	
1967	El camino de los espantos	Capulina	Last Viruta and Capulina's film
1968	Operacion Carambola	Capulina / Agente 13	First Capulina's film
1968	El zángano	Capulina	
1969	El mundo de los aviones	Capulina / El Capitán Mil Horas	
1970	Capulina Speedy González	Capulina Espiridión González	
1973	El bueno para nada	Capulina Mantecón	
1973	Capulina contra las momias	Capulina	
1978	El circo de Capulina	Capulina	
1989	Mi compadre Capulina	Capulina	Last Capulina's film.
2015	Selección Canina	Director Plateas (voice role)	Released 4 years after his death
