= Marco Antonio Campos =

Mexican comedian and actor

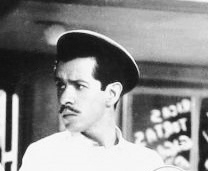
- Marco Antonio Campos «Viruta» in La sombra del otro (1957).
- Born: Marco Antonio Campos Contreras; 9 September 1919; Cuauhtémoc, Mexico City, Mexico
- Died: 19 February 1996 (aged 76); Mexico City, Mexico
- Other name: Viruta
- Spouse: María de los Ángeles

Comedy career
- Years active: 1940–1996
- Genres: Double act, slapstick

Marco Antonio Campos (9 September 1919 – 19 February 1996) was a Mexican comedian, actor, and singer best known as Viruta in the double act Viruta y Capulina with Gaspar Henaine. His best known role is as the straight man in the comic duo Viruta y Capulina along with Gaspar Henaine. Campos and Henaine worked together in 95 comedy films and one television series until they separated over work issues in 1969. He died in 1996 from an aortic aneurysm.

== Selected filmography ==
- Comedians and Songs (1960)

== Awards ==
- 2005, Premio Casa de América de Poesía Americana
