= List of Mexican films of 1956 =

A list of the films produced in Mexico in 1956 (see 1956 in film):

== 1956 ==
Title	Director	Cast	Genre	Notes
1956
Adán y Eva	Alberto Gout	Christiane Martel, Carlos Baena	Drama	
Canasta de cuentos mexicanos	Julio Bracho	María Félix, Pedro Armendáriz, Arturo de Córdova		
La Escondida	Roberto Gavaldón	María Félix, Pedro Armendáriz		
El fantasma de la casa roja				
El inocente	Rogelio A. González	Pedro Infante, Silvia Pinal, Sara García		
La muerte en este jardín (La mort en ce jardin)	Luis Buñuel			
The Medallion Crime	Juan Bustillo Oro	Rosario Granados, Manolo Fábregas, Rita Macedo	Thriller	
El médico de las locas	Miguel Morayta	Tin Tan, Rosita Arenas, Marcelo Chávez		
Talpa	Alfredo B. Crevenna	Sofía Álvarez, René Cardona		Entered into the 1956 Cannes Film Festival
Pueblo, canto y esperanza	Alfredo B. Crevenna	Pedro Infante, Columba Domínguez		
La herida luminosa	Tulio Demicheli	Arturo de Córdova, Yolanda Varela, Amparo Rivelles		
Corazón salvaje	Juan José Ortega	Martha Roth, Carlos Navarro		
The Road of Life	Alfonso Corona Blake			Entered into the 6th Berlin International Film Festival
Spring in the Heart	Roberto Rodríguez	Andy Russell, Irasema Dilián, Enrique Rambal	Musical comedy	
Talpa	Alfredo B. Crevenna	Lilia Prado, Leonor Llausás, Víctor Manuel Mendoza	Drama	
Where the Circle Ends	Alfredo B. Crevenna	Sara Montiel, Raúl Ramírez, Nadia Haro Oliva	Melodrama	
Arm in Arm Down the Street	Juan Bustillo Oro	Marga López, Manuel Fábregas, Carlos Ortigoza		
Barefoot Sultan	Gilberto Martínez Solares	Germán Valdés, Yolanda Varela, Liliana Durán		
El crucifijo de piedra	Carlos Toussaint	Sara García, Rosa Elena Durgel, Fernando Casanova		
Las medias de seda		Carlos Orellana		
Pura Vida	Gilberto Martínez Solares	Antonio Espino, Carmelita González, Maricruz Olivier, Ramón Valdés		
The Bandits of Cold River	Rogelio A. González	Luis Aguilar, César del Campo, Dagoberto Rodríguez		
The Beast of Hollow Mountain	Edward Nassour, Ismael Rodríguez	Guy Madison, Patricia Medina, Carlos Rivas, Mario Navarro		
The Coyote's Justice	Joaquín Luis Romero Marchent	Abel Salazar, Gloria Marín, Manuel Monroy		
The King of Mexico	Rafael Baledón	Adalberto Martínez, Silvia Derbez, Elda Peralta, Rafael Banquells		
The Third Word	Julián Soler	Marga López, Pedro Infante, Sara García, Prudencia Grifell		
Torero!	Carlos Velo		Documentary	The Mexican entry for the Best Foreign Language Film at the 30th Academy Awards

== See also ==
- 1956 in Mexico
