= Arm in Arm Down the Street =

Arm in Arm Down the Street or Del brazo y por la calle in Spanish may refer to:

- Arm in Arm Down the Street (play), a play by Armando Mook
- Arm in Arm Down the Street (1956 film), a Mexican film
- Arm in Arm Down the Street (1966 film), an Argentine film
