= The Beast of Hollow Mountain =

1956 film

- Theatrical release poster
- Directed by: Edward Nassour; Ismael Rodríguez
- Written by: Willis O'Brien (as El Toro Estrella); Robert Hill; Jack DeWitt (dialogue)
- Produced by: Edward Nassour; William Nassour
- Starring: Guy Madison; Patricia Medina; Carlos Rivas; Mario Navarro
- Cinematography: Jorge Stahl Jr.
- Edited by: Holbrook N. Todd; Maury Wright; Fernando Martínez
- Music by: Raúl Lavista
- Color process: Color by Deluxe
- Production companies: Películas Rodriguez; Nassour Studios Inc.
- Distributed by: United Artists
- Release date: August 1956
- Running time: 79 minutes
- Countries: United States; Mexico
- Language: English

The Beast of Hollow Mountain is a 1956 "wild wild west" monster film about an American rancher living in Mexico who discovers that his missing cattle are being preyed upon by a dinosaur. It was directed by Edward Nassour and Ismael Rodríguez, and the screenplay was co-written by Willis O'Brien. It stars Guy Madison, Patricia Medina and Carlos Rivas. United Artists distributed the film in August 1956.

== Plot ==
In southern Mexico at the turn of the 20th century, tales are told of cattle and farmers mysteriously disappearing. These events occur at a location called "Hollow Mountain" where a curse is supposed to be residing. The mountain has never been explored and the swamp at its base is said to claim the lives of anyone foolish enough to go to its banks. In spite of these tales and possible perils, American cowboy Jimmy Ryan leads his business partner Felipe and their worker Manuel into the area one day in search of lost cattle. When they arrive, they split up to track the cattle down. Felipe falls into a quicksand pit at the base of the swamp and nearly drowns but is rescued by Jimmy and his lasso. When Manuel arrives the three spot a single drowned cattle in the swamp. Despite Manuel believing the curse of the Hollow Mountain to be responsible, Jimmy and Felipe remain unconvinced. Felipe and Manuel return to Jimmy and Felipe's cattle ranch while Jimmy goes to meet with Don Pedro, the local town's alcalde.

Back in town, Jimmy passes by a cantina where a young boy Panchito awaits his father Pancho, who has been drinking copious amounts of tequila to forget his deceased wife. As the two are leaving, a gang of young boys throw firecrackers at them, causing Pancho to fall off his horse and get dragged across the ground. Jimmy notices this happen and stops the horse, saving Pancho. After Jimmy and the nearby townsfolk make sure Pancho is okay, Don Pedro's daughter Sarita arrives to berate Pancho for drinking and neglecting Panchito. After she has Panchito take Pancho back to her home, Sarita thanks Jimmy and he escorts her home. Upon arrival, Don Pedro greets Jimmy and the two discuss the disappearing cattle, which Don Pedro believes the curse might be responsible for. While the two are talking, Don Enrique, an abrasive caballero engaged to Sarita, arrives and demands Jimmy leave the country and return to Texas. Enrique hates Jimmy, partially because he does not want Sarita associating with an American, but also because does not want Ryan to ranch his cattle here since he is more successful with business deals than Enrique. The two almost fight but Don Pedro breaks it up, causing Jimmy to apologize and leave.

The next morning, Jimmy and Felipe read a note from Manuel and the other two ranch hands saying they are afraid of the curse of the Hollow Mountain and have quit. Ryan and Felipe find Pancho and Panchito working in their place, and Panchito promises to be responsible for Pancho to keep him from drinking, which Pancho corroborates, so Jimmy decides to hire them. While Jimmy and the Panchos are out searching for missing cattle for an upcoming shipment, Sarita arrives and rebukes Jimmy for stealing them, but Jimmy has Pancho explain that he and Panchito came and asked for the job. After Jimmy leaves, an unconvinced Sarita demands they return to her home but they both refuse, saying their working at the ranch will help Jimmy and help them to be more responsible. Pancho and Panchito inform Sarita that Jimmy's men left after being both threatened and bribed by a mysterious man who gave them orders on what reason to leave behind.

Despite concern for the growing conspiracy against Jimmy, Sarita follows him to the top of the nearby mountain to apologize, and the two share a moment. Sarita seems half-hearted about her upcoming marriage to Enrique, but Jimmy tries to be supportive. When Sarita leaves to go home, she finds her horse is missing, so Jimmy gives her a ride into town. When they arrive, Enrique spots them as she leaves for home. Enraged at seeing Sarita in Jimmy's arms (albeit momentarily to get her down), he attacks Jimmy and a street fight ensues. Eventually Jimmy wins and is able to overpower Enrique, and then he examines a letter from the customer regarding his upcoming shipment, saying they have approved his price, much to Jimmy's delight.

The next day, Don Pedro visits Jimmy and Felipe to scold Jimmy for starting a street fight in his town. He then tells Jimmy that Enrique wants to buy their ranch before the shipment is made, but Jimmy and Felipe refuse. Don Pedro assures them says that Enrique will do everything in his power to make things unpleasant for Jimmy should he continue to ranch in Mexico, but Jimmy and Felipe stand firm on their decision, which Don Pedro respects as he leaves. A few days later Enrique and Sarita argue about the events that led to the fight. Sarita gets angry with him for displaying such distrust when all Jimmy did was help her. Enrique reasons that it was mainly just because he loves Sarita. Sarita pleads for him to become friends with Jimmy, much to Enrique's disgust, and she assures him all she wants is for them to be happy. Enrique agrees with this sentiment, bearing an ominous look on his face.

Jimmy, Felipe, and the Panchos happen upon a cottage near the swamp whose former owner mysteriously disappeared. While Panchito guards the horses, the three men head out and find the body of another missing cow, once again drowned in the swamp. Pancho wants to explore the swamp but is stopped by Jimmy, who feels it is too unsafe for him. Jimmy decides to get a loan from the bank to ensure the smooth charter of the cattle shipment, so he and Felipe head to town. In town Sarita greets them and apologizes for Enrique's behavior, voicing her belief that there will be no more misunderstandings. Yet again, Enrique spots them and complains about Jimmy to Don Pedro, who says he worries for nothing. Unconvinced, Enrique gets two of his men to apply to work on Jimmy's ranch and wait to sabotage him until the right time. Meanwhile, Ryan and Felipe find they have to pay cash for the supplies they need, so Jimmy tries to go to the bank for the loan. As he leaves unsuccessful, Felipe reveals that two men—the men secretly hired by Enrique—are willing to work for them and wait until after the shipment for their double payment.

The day before the local festival and Sarita's wedding, while Pancho and Panchito sneak off toward the cottage, a young boy interrupts Jimmy's feeding of a young calf to deliver him a letter from Sarita to meet her at the graveyard. After Jimmy arrives, Sarita, relieved to see that Jimmy has seen her message, talks with him about why has he not given up his ranch up to Enrique. She then says that she really wants hostilities to end between Jimmy and Enrique, but because neither will back down one of them will end up dead. Since she does not want either scenario to happen, she sadly begs him to leave the country, prompting Jimmy to leave the graveyard. At the cottage, Pancho asks Panchito to wait for him while he goes to the swamp to look for the lost cattle, trusting Panchito to tell Jimmy about what happened at a certain point. After a while of searching, Pancho wanders through the swamp and happens upon the Beast of Hollow Mountain. Despite Pancho's efforts to shoot the Beast to death, the Beast eats Pancho alive off-screen.

After he returns to the ranch, Jimmy tells Felipe he will move away during the cattle shipment, giving Felipe full ownership of the ranch and getting Enrique off his back. Felipe is taken aback by this, and then tells Jimmy that if he follows through on this, he will kill Enrique. Suddenly, Panchito come to their door, saying that his father has not returned from the swamp. Jimmy and Felipe go and find only Pancho's hat, assuming the worst. They return and Jimmy lies to Panchito, who refuses to leave his father in the swamp and tries to go in, only to be stopped by Jimmy. The next day, the festival is going on in town, and while workers are busy gathering food and putting up streamers and displays, Panchito sullenly mulls about, refusing to talk to anyone. Jimmy talks to Don Pedro about Pancho's death, and Don Pedro promises he and his household will take good care of Panchito and wishes Jimmy well. Jimmy tries to bid Panchito goodbye but Panchito rebuffs him and breaks away. Jimmy again meets Sarita and has a meaningful goodbye with her, saying that if he saw her again he'd never let her go. He departs, leaving Sarita heartbroken.

The festival is well underway, with dancers and firecrackers entertaining crowds. Enrique wanders through and then meets with his men to discuss his plan to stampede the cattle away from the station and scatter them to the hills, planning to make the shipment himself. The men follow Enrique's orders to wait before stampeding the cattle and lie down and drink together. Meanwhile, as Sarita prepares for her wedding, her conversation with her father causes her to have second thoughts. As Don Pedro's assistant Margarita goes to make further preparations, Panchito decides once and for all to go to the swamp after his father. Margarita tries to stop him by telling him the truth, but he refuses to accept the truth and rides away on a horse. Margarita finds Sarita changing into riding gear and asks if she's not going to put on her wedding dress, and Sarita answers that'll be up to Jimmy. Margarita then tells Sarita about Panchito's departure, and she goes out to stop him.

At the ranch, the beast from Hollow Mountain, a Allosaurus, arrives and kills one of the cattle, forcing the others into a stampede, much to the surprise of Enrique's men. The cattle race toward the village where the festival is taking place. Jimmy and Felipe hear them coming and race to stop them. Enrique's men race to him and Don Pedro ahead of the cattle who begin stampeding the village, causing much panic and disrupting the festival. One of Enrique's men tells him he was right about the stampede being dangerous, accidentally revealing Enrique as the mastermind behind sabotaging Jimmy. Don Pedro admonishes Enrique for going against their promise to leave Jimmy alone. Just then, Margarita tells them that Jimmy and Sarita have gone after Panchito, who had run away. Enrique, enraged and jealous upon hearing that Sarita said she would not marry Enrique without speaking to Jimmy, jumps on a horse and goes to gun Jimmy down.

While Panchito is in the swamp, he is discovered by the Allosaurus, which chases him across a river and to the cottage, where Sarita intercepts him. The two decide to hide in the cottage, but the Allosaurus arrives and breaks through the roof. As it feels around for the two, Sarita keeps it away be stabbing at it with a long pole. But the Allosaurus knocks it out of her hand and continues to attack them. Jimmy then arrives and distracts the Allosaurus with gunfire, causing it to chase Jimmy instead. He orders Sarita and Pancho to get out of the cottage, and while they flee to Panchito's horse, Jimmy leads the Allosaurus toward a mountain. While Jimmy is hiding, he notices Enrique's arrival and tries to warn him, but the sight of the Allosaurus causes Enrique's horse to buck and throw him off. The Allosaurus chases Enrique across a swamp and onto a plain, where Jimmy pulls him up. The two flee on Ryan's horse and are forced to slide down a steep slope, where they are thrown off at the bottom. The Allosaurus follows them down and into a small cave on the side of the Hollow Mountain. The Allosaurus reaches in, and despite Jimmy stabbing its arm with a knife, the Allosaurus grabs and strangles Enrique to death. Jimmy is saved by the arrival of Sarita and Panchito, who have gathered Felipe, Don Pedro, and other cowboys who fire at the Beast to distract it. While the Allosaurus is distracted by them, Jimmy and Felipe head over to the tar pit where Jimmy enters after shooting the Allosaurus again. Jimmy throws his lasso around a tree branch, hoists himself upwards on the rope, and begins to swing back and forth, barely out of the Allosaurus's reach. After a few attempts to attack Jimmy, the Allosaurus walks forward a few steps and gets its feet caught in the tar. It roars helplessly as it begins to sink down into the tar while Jimmy is reunited with Sarita, Panchito, Felipe, Don Felipe, and the others. They watch as the Allosaurus, roaring in agony, sinks and drowns in the tar pit. They stare at the pit for a few seconds and then walk slowly toward their horses, secure in the knowledge that their town is safe.

== Cast ==
- Guy Madison as Jimmy Ryan
- Patricia Medina as Sarita
- Carlos Rivas as Felipe Sanchez
- Eduardo Noriega as Enrique Rios
- Julio Villarreal as Don Pedro
- Mario Navarro as Panchito
- Pascual García Peña as Pancho
- Lupe Carriles as Margarita

== Production ==
The Beast of Hollow Mountain was the first film to depict cowboys battling dinosaurs. The story was developed from an original idea from special effects innovator Willis H. O'Brien, who had earlier fleshed out the concept into a script titled The Valley of the Mists, which he had not been able to get made into a movie. The Valley of the Mists would eventually, after O'Brien's death, be filmed as The Valley of Gwangi (1969), with effects by Ray Harryhausen.

O'Brien was in talks to do the effects for The Beast of Hollow Mountain, but that responsibility was ultimately given to Jack Rabin, Henry Sharp and Louis de Witt instead.

Filmed in color and in CinemaScope at Churubusco Studios in Mexico City, The Beast of Hollow Mountain was one of the few American–Mexican co-productions of the 1950s. A Spanish-language version of the film was shot simultaneously, and released in Mexico under the title La bestia de la montaña.

== In popular culture ==
- It's About Time, featured in episode 1
- Count Gore de Vol, May 3, 1975 episode
- Svengoolie, June 10, 1995 episode
- Monster Madhouse Live
- Mystery Science Theater 3000 episode, season 11

== See also ==
- List of films featuring dinosaurs
