= The Spooky Movie Film Festival =

- Location: Washington, D.C.
- Founded: 2006
- Language: English
- Website: www.spookyfest.com

Spooky Movie - The Washington, D.C. International Horror Film Festival (a.k.a. The Spooky Movie Film Festival) was an internationally recognized showcase for independent and underground filmmakers of the horror, science fiction and fantasy genres. It ran from 2006 to 2020.

== Background ==
Founded in 2006, the Spooky Movie Film Festival was one of the Mid-Atlantic region's largest dedicated genre film festivals. Beginning in 2012 the festival was hosted by the AFI Silver Theatre and Cultural Center in Silver Spring, Maryland.

In 2020, when announcing that year’s festival dates, the organisers also announced that the festival would be cancelled from 2021 onwards.

== See also ==
- Count Gore de Vol
- Lloyd Kaufman
- John Dimes
- Steve Niles
