= Antonio Raxel =

Mexican actor (1922–1999)

Antonio Salazar Alejos (13 April 1922 – 25 November 1999), professionally known as Antonio Raxel, was a Mexican actor. He was also a dubbing actor for TV shows, movies, and animation.

== Education and acting career ==
Raxel was born in Chiapa de Corzo in Chiapas. Raxel studied his career at the National Institute of Fine Arts under the tutelage of master Japanese Seki Sano. While here Raxel participated in 85 plays.

He started working in professional theater companies, primarily the Maria Tereza Montoya, Anita Blanch and Enrique Rambal.

His film career began in 1950, in supporting roles and he became a star next to stars of the golden age Mexican cinema, participating in at least 250 tapes.

By 1952 he entered television through soap operas such as "Teresa".

His biggest hits were La Familia Barrett, Sexteto, where he performed alongside Chula Prieto, and La idiota, next to Vilma Gonzalez.

== Dubbing career ==
Antonio Raxel’s distinctive voice was featured in various projects in film as well as TV and dubbing of the period. He appeared with comedy and suspense actors in such films as Santo y Blue Demon contra Drácula y el Hombre Lobo (Santo and Blue Demon vs. Dracula and the Wolfman).

He won the Virginia Fabregas award in 1974 for his work.

For several decades he participated heavily in Mexican cinema with great success, and in the 80's he featured in supporting and main roles in the movies categories of "files" and "puns" as well as in films alongside Luis de Alba of Chelo Gomez.

He did various jobs in dubbing including with the Audiomaster studio of the dubbing company Televisa, with laboratories in Los Angeles in the U.S. In 1982, during his stay with the company in that city, he alternated between different roles such as Mandrake (the cartoon) and Defenders of the Earth. He was also narrator of the anime series, Robotech, Voltron and Mazinger, which combined for the first time duo sync dubbing with a female actress to impersonate the Baron Ashler of Mazinger in his masculine role. He worked alongside dubbing novices such as Jesus Barrero and Juan Alfonso Carralero in this role.

Antonio Raxel died in Mexico City on November 25, 1999.

== Filmography ==
- Infierno en la sierra (2000) (Edición post-mortem)
- Horas amargas (1999)
- Sangre prisionera (1999)
- Siete millones (1999)
- Tres de guerrero, Los (1999)
- Fuera de la ley (1998)
- Agentes de servicios especiales (1998)
- Dientes de oro
- Precio de la fama(1998)Regreso sangriento (1998)
- Víctimas de la mafia (1998)
- Barón de la mafia (1997)
- Cruzando el Rio Bravo: Frontera asesina (1997)
- Los Cuatro de Michoacán (1997)
- Herencia fatal (1997)
- La Mafia nunca muere (1997)
- Pacas de a kilo (1997)
- Sentenciado sin delito (1997) (V)
- Tierra de sangre (1997)
- Violencia policiaca (1997)
- Volver a nacer (1997)
- Fuera ropa (1995)
- Chantaje, complot criminal (1995)
- Condena para un inocente (1995)
- Llamada anónima (1995)
- Perro caliente (1995)
- La Asesinadita (1994)
- Dos gallos pisadores (1994)
- Duelo final (1994)
- Mi amigo Juan (1994)
- Suerte en la vida (1994)
- Chicas en peligro (1993)
- Cuestión de honor (1993)
- Escorpión, Alerta roja (1993)
- Locura mexicana (1993)
- El Nieto de Zapata (1993)
- Un Pistolero implacable (1993)
- Tragedia en Waco, Texas (1993)
- EL Fiscal de hierro 3, (1992)
- Don Herculano anda suelto (1992)
- Ramiro Sierra (1992)
- Revancha implacable (1992)
- Seducción sangrienta (1992)
- Secuestro de un policía(1991)
- Andanzas de Agapito(1991)
- La Blazer blindada (1991)
- Espionaje mortal (1991)
- Golpe brutal (1991)
- Los Repartidores (1991)
- Violento amanecer (1991)
- Juan Nadie (1990)
- La Sombra del Tunco (1990)
- Al que nace pa' tamal, del cielo le caen las desas (1990)
- Chelo Gómez, detective privado (1990)
- Crimen en presidio (1990)
- EL Dandy y sus mujeres (1990)
- Demonios del desierto (1990)
- Dos chicanos chiludos (1990?
- La Gata Cristy (1990)
- El Hombre de hielo (1990)
- La Hora 24 (1990)
- Mojada engañada, La (1990)
- Muerte bajo la piel (1990)
- Se me doblo la carabina (1990)
- El Servidor publico (1990)
- La Soplona (1990)
- El Tesorito de Crispin (1990)
- Unidos por la garnacha (1990)
- La Vengadora implacable (1990)
- Mi compadre Capulina (1989)
- El Chácharas (1989)
- El Cartero alburero (1989)
- Casta de braceros (1989)
- Entre picudos te veas (1989)
- El Miedo me da risa (1989)
- Pánico en el bosque (1989)
- Si me las dan me las tomo (1989)
- La Venganza de Don Herculano (1989)
- Sabor a mí (1988)
- EL Solitario indomable (1988)
- Central camionera (1988)
- Contrabando, amor y muerte (1988)
- Durazo, la verdadera historia (1988)
- El Fiscal de hierro (1988)
- Itara, el guardian de la muerte (1988)
- Muerte brutal (1988)
- Sabado D.F. (1988)
- Taquito de ojo (1988)
- Un Tipo duro de pelar (1988)
- Cinco nacos asaltan Las Vegas (1987)
- La Mujer policía (1987)
- Lamberto Quintero (1987)
- Policía judicial federal (1987)
- Yo el ejecutor (1987)
- Adorables criminales (1987)
- Conexión México (1987)
- Muelle rojo (1987)
- Las Zorras (1987)
- Motín en la cárcel (1986)
- Forajidos en la mira (1985)
- El Judicial 2 (1985)
- Maniatico pasional (1980)
- La Muerte también cabalga (1979)
- Las Pobres ilegales (1979)
- Mariachi - Fiesta de sangre (1977)
- Las Cenizas del diputado (1977)
- Los Tres reyes magos (1976)
- Coronación (1976)
- El Compadre más padre (1976)
- Santo en Anónimo mortal (1975)
- Los Leones del ring contra la Cosa Nostra (1974)
- Los Leones del ring (1974)
- Los Miserables (1974) Serie de TV
- El tuerto Angustias (1974)
- Aquellos años (1973)
- Santo y Blue Demon contra Drácula y el Hombre Lobo (1973)
- Las Tarántulas (1973)
- Un Sueño de amor (1972)
- Triángulo (1972)
- Ni solteros, ni casados (1972)
- Treinta centavos de muerte (1972)
- Chico Ramos (1971)
- Mama Dolores (1971)
- El Sabor de la venganza (1971)
- Ya somos hombres (1971)
- El Amor tiene cara de mujer (1971) Soap Opera
- Pequeñeces (1971) Soap Opera
- Chanoc en las garras de las fieras (1970)
- El Mundo del los muertos (1970)
- La Vida de Chucho el Roto (1970)
- Capulina corazón de leon (1970)
- Los Problemas de mamá (1970)
- Angelitos negros (1970) Soap Opera
- La gata (1970) Soap Opera
- Las Impuras (1969)
- El Día de las madres (1969)
- Alerta, alta tensión (1969)
- La Familia (1969) Soap Opera
- La Gran aventura (1969)
- Cinco en la cárcel (1968)
- Blue Demon contra las diabólicas (1968)
- Rubi (1968) Soap Opera
- Corazón salvaje (1968)
- Corona de lágrimas (1968)
- El tesoro de Moctezuma (1968)
- Vestidas y alborotadas (1968)
- Desnudarse y morir (1968)
- Operación 67 (1967)
- Los alegres Aguilares (1967)
- Alma Grande en el desierto (1967)
- Serenata en noche de luna (1967)
- Chanoc (1967)
- Las amiguitas de los ricos (1967)
- Doctor Satán (1966)
- La cigüeña distraída (1966)
- Los dos rivales (1966)
- Los jinetes de la bruja (1966)
- El indomable (1966)
- Marcelo y María (1966)
- Juan Pistolas (1966)
- Cuando el diablo sopla (1966)
- Dos meseros majaderos (1966)
- Juan Colorado (1966)
- Juventud sin ley (Rebeldes a go-go) (1966)
- Los Cuatro Juanes (1966)
- La Vida de Pedro Infante (1966)
- La Alegría de vivir (1965)
- Pistoleros del oeste (1965)
- Cargando con el muerto (1965)
- Las Tapatías nunca pierden (1965)
- Guitarras lloren guitarras (1965)
- El Bracero del año (1964)
- La Juventud se impone (1964)
- Luna de miel para nueve (1964)
- Me llaman el cantaclaro (1964)
- El Espadachín (1964)
- Frente al destino (1964)
- El Mundo de las drogas (1964)
- La Sombra de los hijos (1964)
- Los Astronautas (1964)
- La Mente y el crimen (1964)
- Neutrón contra el criminal sádico (1964)
- Nos dicen los intocables (1964)
- Dile que la quiero (1963)
- Los Bravos de California (1963)
- Herencia maldita (1963)
- México de mis recuerdos (1963)
- De color moreno (1963)
- En la vieja California (1963)
- Fuerte, audaz y valiente (1963)
- Aventuras de las hermanas X (1963)
- La Cabeza viviente (1963) (Ojo de la muerte)
- El Monstruo de los volcanes (1963)
- Santo contra el rey del crimen (1962)
- La Barranca sangrienta (1962)
- El Cielo y la tierra (1962)
- The Extra (1962)
- The Bloody Vampire (1962)
- Servicio secreto (1962)
- Pilotos de la muerte (1962)
- Nostradamus y el destructor de monstruos (1962)
- Sol en llamas (1962)
- El Terrible gigante de las nieves (1962)
- Los Espadachines de la reina (1961)
- Con la misma moneda (1961)
- El Gato con botas (1961)
- Suicídate mi amor (1961)
- El Aviador fenómeno (1961)
- Mujeres engañadas (1961)
- Senda prohibida (1961)
- Ojos tapatios (1961)
- Vacaciones en Acapulco (1961)
- Orlak, el infierno de Frankenstein (1960)
- Las Canciones unidas (1960)
- His First Love (1960)
- My Mother Is Guilty (1960)
- Gran pillo (1960)
- La Maldición de Nostradamus (1960)
- Verano violento (1960)
- El Grito de la muerte (1959)
- Los Hermanos Diablo (1959)
- 800 leguas por el Amazonas (1959)
- Nacida para amar (1959)
- Del suelo no paso (1959)
- Los Diablos del terror (1959)
- Misterios de ultratumba (1959)
- Vagabundo y millonario (1959)
- Cuentan de una mujer (1959)
- Cadenas de amor (1959) Soap Opera
- Teresa (1959) Soap Opera
- Águila negra contra los enmascarados de la muerte (1958)
- Maratón de baile (1958)
- Gran espectáculo (1958)
- El Ataúd del Vampiro (1958)
- Los muertos no hablan (1958)
- Rebelión de la sierra (1958)
- The Boxer (1958)
- La Máscara de carne (1958)
- El Último rebelde (1958)
- La Torre de marfil (1958)
- Sueños de oro (1958)
- Gallo colorado (1957)
- The New World (1957)
- La Diana cazadora (1957)
- Cuatro contra el imperio (1957)
- Here Are the Aguilares! (1957)
- La Faraona (1956)
- Una Lección de amor (1956)
- Spring in the Heart (1956)
- Ultraje al amor (1956)
- Where the Circle Ends (1956)
- Mi canción eres tú (1956)
- Historia de un amor (1956)
- Tres melodías de amor (1955)
- La Mujer ajena(1955)
- De carne somos (1955)
- Seductor (1955)
- Father Against Son (1955)
- Las Engañadas (1955)
- La Sospechosa (1955)
- Historia de un abrigo de mink (1955)
- La Rival (1955)
- The Murderer X (1955)
- Frente al pecado de ayer (1955)
- Prisionera del pasado (1954)
- Chucho el Roto (1954)
- Solamente una vez (1954)
- La Duda (1954)
- La Ladrona (1954)
- Casa de muñecas (1954)
- La Infame (1954)
- Yo no creo en los hombres (1954)
- Padre nuestro (1953)
- El Señor fotógrafo (1953)
- Mujeres que trabajan (1953)

=== Dubbing roles ===
- Voltron - Anime Series, Narrator of the series (approx. 1984)
- Mazinger Z, Anime Series, Narrator in the second half of the series, and masculine voice of Barón Ashler. (1982, Voice dubbing)
- Bravestarr Narrator of the introduction of the American Cartoon. (approx. 1983)
- Yogi's Treasure Hunt – Melquiades the Lion
- Defenders of the Earth, American cartoon, Mandrake the magician, (approx 1982)
- Robotech, Anime Series, Narrator of some of the chapters in the series, (approx. 1981)
- 007: On Her Majesty's Secret Service - Narration
- Star Wars: Episode IV (original dubbing) - Uncle Owen
- The Last Unicorn - Rey Haggard
- Bewitched – voice of Larry Tate
- The Addams Family – Voice of Lurch (known as Largo in Latin America)
- Star Trek II - Mr. Spock
- Star Trek VI - Mr. Spock
- Batman - Commissioner Gordon
- A Cowboy in Africa – Voice of Jim Sinclair
- Land of Giants – Voice of Mark Wilson
- Ewoks - Master Logray
- Family Affair - voice of Uncle Bill (originally played by Brian Keith) 1971
