= John Dimes =

American novelist (born 1966)

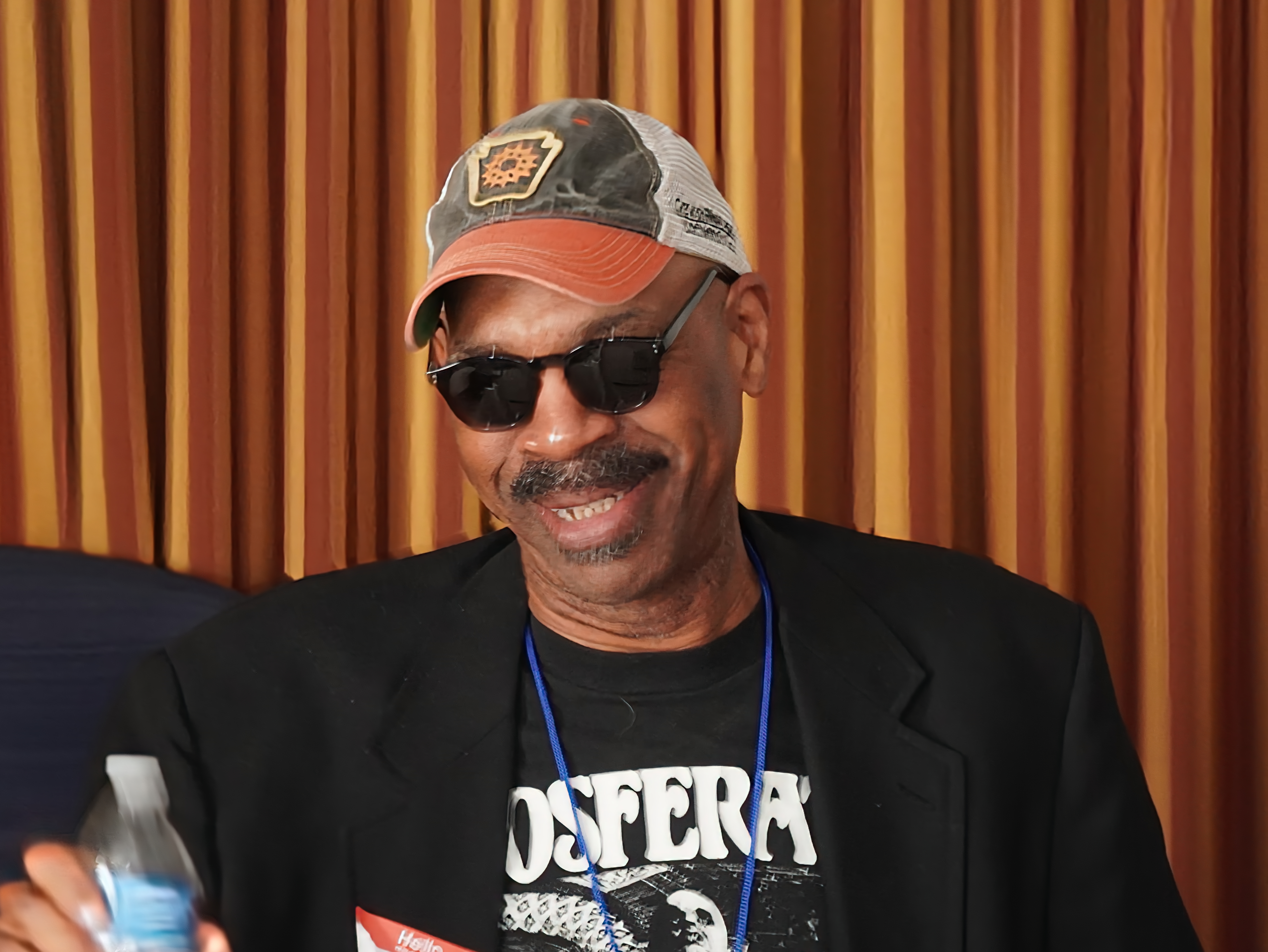
- Dimes at Raven Con 16 in 2023
- Born: January 27, 1966 (age 60); Washington, D.C., U.S.
- Occupations: Author; Artist; Singer; Actor

John Dimes (born January 27, 1966) is an American author, artist, singer, actor and award-winning comedian. He is best known as the horror host Dr. Sarcofiguy, the first (and still only) African-American horror host.

In addition to this, Dimes has written several novels, such as the graphic novel Tales of Home, the surreal thriller Coincidissonance and the mockumentary guidebook The White Corpse Hustle: A Guide for the Fledgeling Vampire, which has been favorably compared to the writings of Douglas Adams. This is the first of a planned trilogy. Outside of his illustrations for his novels, Dimes' artwork has been showcased in Washington, D.C. galleries.

== Background ==
Dimes began performing as a stand-up comedian, working alongside David Chapelle, Patton Oswalt and Wanda Sykes. He has appeared in several independent films, including the satire The Blair Bitch Project (1999) and the documentaries The Wave (1996) and American Scary (2006), which screened at the 2007 San Diego Comic Con. In 1995 John sang on the stage of the Apollo Theatre, and later that same year, Halloween 1995, his program, The Spooky Movie, debuted on Falls Church Community TV (formerly "Channel 38"), where it continuesto run every Friday night. TSM can be seen around the country through the Horror Host Underground Network.

In 2006 and 2007 Sarcofiguy made appearances on the television program Monster Madhouse Live and in October of both years co-hosted "The Spooky Movie Film Festival" in Fairfax, Virginia with his friend, and childhood idol, "Count Gore de Vol", Washington-Baltimore's popular 1970s and 1980s horror host. Sarcofiguy is a regular contributor to "The Count's" weekly webprogram.

== Filmography ==
=== Film ===
Year	Title	Role	Production company
2025	For Sale by Exorcist	Father Doyle	Epic Pictures
2022	Out There Halloween Mega Tape	Sullen Truck Driver	Midnight Crew Studios
2016	Stellar Quasar and the Scrolls of Dadelia	Alien Newscaster	Midnight Marquee Productions
2015	Bowman Body Hosts City of the Dead	Dr. Sarcofiguy	Horse Archer Productions
2013	Pine Bros. Presents: Cinema Insomnia Haunted House Special	Professor Ex-Exorcist	Cinema Insomnia Productions / Zom-Bee TV
2009	Amulet	Rameel	Tearabull Pictures
2002	The Horror Host Underground: Horror Hosts from Coast to Coast	Dr. Sacofiguy	The Horror Host Underground
