= The Hypnotist (1940 film) =

- Directed by: Antonio Helú
- Produced by: Salvador Elizondo
- Starring: Carmen Hermosillo; Carlos López Moctezuma
- Release date: 31 August 1940
- Country: Mexico
- Language: Spanish

The Hypnotist (Spanish:El hipnotizador) is a 1940 Mexican comedy mystery film directed by Antonio Helú and starring Carmen Hermosillo and Carlos López Moctezuma.

== Cast ==
- Joaquín Coss
- Esteban V. Escalante
- Carmen Hermosillo
- Rafael Icardo
- Carlos López Moctezuma
- Miguel Montemayor
- Manuel Noriega
- Ramón Vallarino

== Bibliography ==
- Angel Villatoro. Anuario Cinematográfico Latino Americano: 1946-47, Volume 1.
