= Rafael Estrada =

Mexican actor

- Occupation: Actor
- Years active: 1948 - 1964 (film)

Rafael Estrada was a Mexican film actor. He appeared in more than sixty films during his career.

== Selected filmography ==
- Doctor on Call (1950)
- The Murderer X (1955)
- Father Against Son (1955)
- The Medallion Crime (1956)
- Where the Circle Ends (1956)
- The Road of Life (1956)
- The Life of Agustín Lara (1959)
- His First Love (1960)
- Three Black Angels (1960)

== Bibliography ==
- Cotter, Bob. The Mexican Masked Wrestler and Monster Filmography. McFarland & Company, 2005.
