= Sharon Douglas =

American actress (1920–2016)

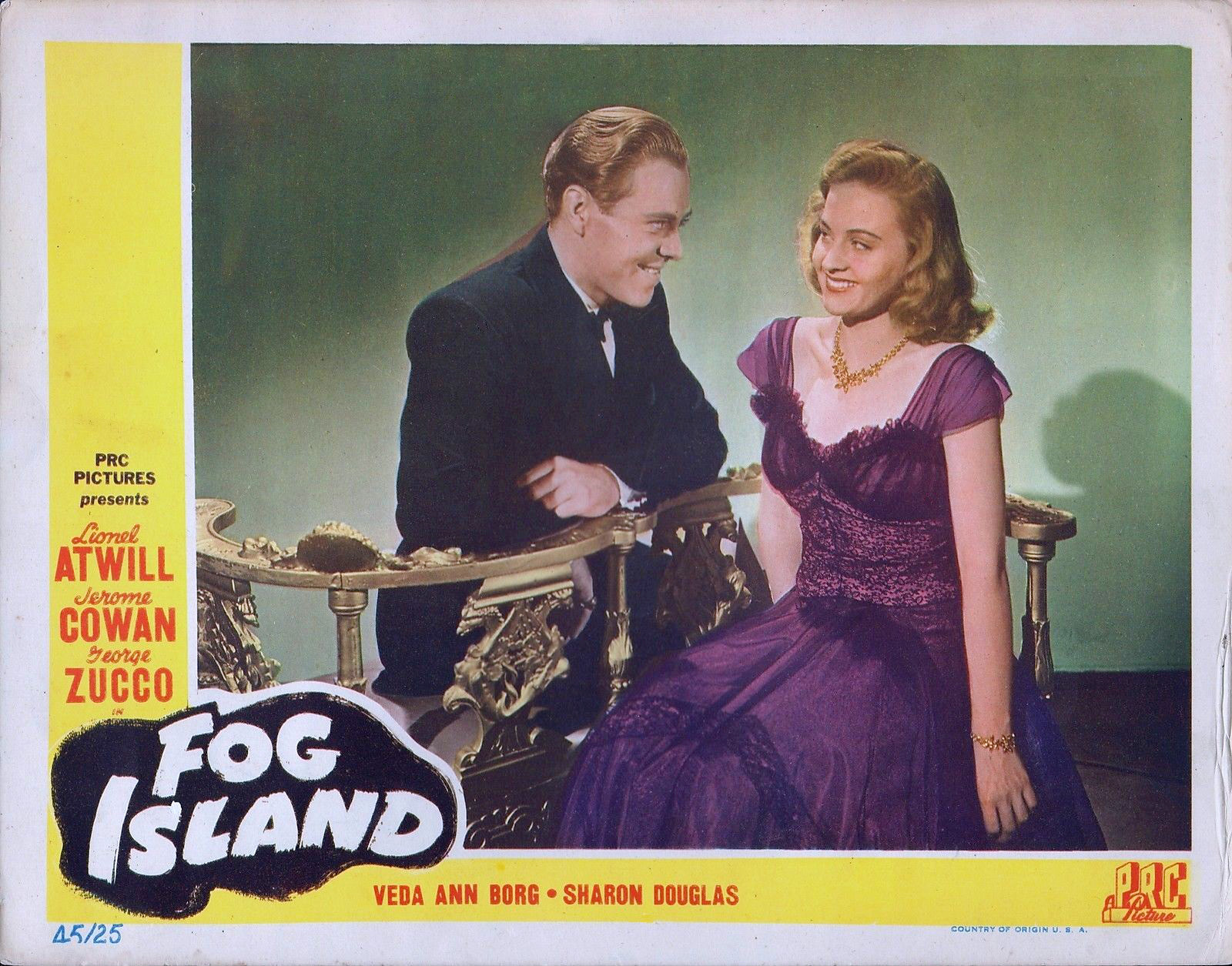
- Lobby card from Fog Island (1945)
- Born: Rhoda-Nelle Rader; October 16, 1920; Stephens County, Oklahoma, US
- Died: June 18, 2016 (aged 95)
- Other name: Rhodanelle Rader
- Occupation: Actress
- Years active: 1942–1980
- Spouses: Edward Nassour (m. 1946–1962) (his death) Phillip M. Gabriel (m. 1964–1968) (divorced): Joseph Fox(divorced)
- Children: 4

Sharon Douglas (born Rhoda-Nelle Rader; October 16, 1920 – June 18, 2016) was an American film and radio actress, most active in the 1940s and 1950s.

== Early life ==
The daughter of Mr. and Mrs. L.M. Rader, Douglas was born in Stephens County, Oklahoma. (A newspaper article about her high school graduation gives her first name as Rhodanelle.) She graduated from Las Cruces Union High School in Las Cruces, New Mexico.

== Career ==
She moved to Hollywood in 1939, struck up a friendship with Hedda Hopper, and became her protégé, with regular appearances on Hopper's popular 1940s radio show. Her stage name was chosen in tribute to her mother's Scottish ancestry. Hopper had NBC hire Douglas to play Lana Turner in a radio biography of her early life, and later introduced her to the RKO movie mogul Howard Hughes, who took her personally under his wing, pitching her as a rival to Jane Greer.

Douglas's earliest roles in film were bit parts, but in 1942 was offered a lead role in A Gentleman After Dark, opposite Brian Donlevy. Other good parts followed, but radio was where Douglas "really found her métier", in long-running serials such as 1944's The Gallant Heart, and the 132-week World War II run of The Life of Riley, starring William Bendix and a "monumental success". She portrayed Babs, Riley's daughter, in the program.

Other roles on radio included Bobby's girlfriend in The Remarkable Miss Tuttle, Millie Anderson in A Day in the Life of Dennis Day, Mabel in Joan Davis Time, Virginia Brickel in My Mother's Husband, and Terry Burton in The Second Mrs. Burton. Her other work in radio included The Abbott and Costello Show.

== Personal life ==
On July 30, 1946, Douglas married Lebanese-American producer Edward Nassour in Hollywood, California. They had four children together. In 1962 he committed suicide. Douglas had two other short marriages, both of which ended in divorce.

== Death ==
Douglas died on June 18, 2016, aged 95. The location was not disclosed. She was survived by her children.

== Filmography ==
- A Gentleman After Dark (1942)
- Wedtime Stories (short, 1943)
- The Navy Way (1944)
- Fog Island (1945)
- Our Hearts Were Growing Up (1946)
- Pretty Maids All in a Row (1971)
- The Daughters of Joshua Cabe (1972)
- The Vendetta (1974)
- The F.B.I. (1974)
- Jimmy B. & André (1980)

== Radio ==
- The Second Mrs. Burton (1941–43)
- The Gallant Heart (1944)
- The Life of Riley (WW2)
- The Sky’s the Limit (1949)
- The Abbott & Costello Show (1949–52)
