= Antonio Helú =

Mexican screenwriter and film director

Antonio Helú Atta
- Born: 17 June 1900; San Luis Potosi, Mexico
- Died: 20 December 1972 (aged 72); Mexico City, Mexico
- Occupations: Writer, Director
- Years active: 1936-1960 (film)

Antonio Helú Atta (1900–1972) was a Mexican screenwriter and film director.

According to Darrell B. Lockhart, Helú Atta was supposedly the first writer to have created a recurring Mexican detective figure in literature, namely Máximo Roldán. The originality of this character was that he did not belong to a law enforcement agency, but was himself a minor criminal ("Roldán" would be the anagram of "ládron", "thief" in Spanish).

A common theme in Helú Atta's work was the lack of faith of the protagonist in the justice system.

Referring to Helú Atta, the poet Xavier Villaurrutia stated "For the readers of police novels exists a small oasis of police stories by Antonio Helú". According to the writer Carlos Monsiváis, Helú Atta was "an author that truly believed in detective literature and dedicated most of his life to it".

Antonio Helú Atta also translated in Spanish works by Mark Twain and Nathaniel Hawthorne. He was the founder of the magazine Selecciones policiacas y de misterio, the Spanish version of the magazine Ellery Queen's Mystery Magazine.

== Selected filmography ==
=== Director ===
- The Obligation to Assassinate (1937)
- The Pretty Indian Girl (1938)
- The Hypnotist (1940)
- When the Ground Trembled (1942)

=== Screenwriter ===
- Arsène Lupin (1947)
- The Murderer X (1955)
- Father Against Son (1955)
- Arm in Arm Down the Street (1956)
- The Medallion Crime (1956)

== Novels ==
- Pepe Vargas al teléfono, 1925. 29 pages.
- El centro de gravedad, 1925.
- Los predestinados, 1925.

== Plays ==
- (co-writer) El crimen del insurgentes: comedia policiaca en tres actos, 1935.

== Bibliography ==
- Darrell B. Lockhart (2004). Latin American Mystery Writers: An A-to-Z Guide. Greenwood Publishing Group. ISBN 978-0-313-30554-2..
- Persephone Braham (2004). Crimes against the State, Crimes against Persons: Detective Fiction in Cuba and Mexico. Univ Of Minnesota Press. ASIN B0077J9DXM.
- Glen S. Close (2008). Contemporary Hispanic Crime Fiction: A Transatlantic Discourse on Urban Violence. Palgrave Macmillan. ISBN 978-0230607972.
- Fernando Fabio Sánchez (2010). Artful Assassins: Murder as Art in Modern Mexico. Vanderbilt University Press. ISBN 978-0826517265.
