= Dos tipos de cuidado =

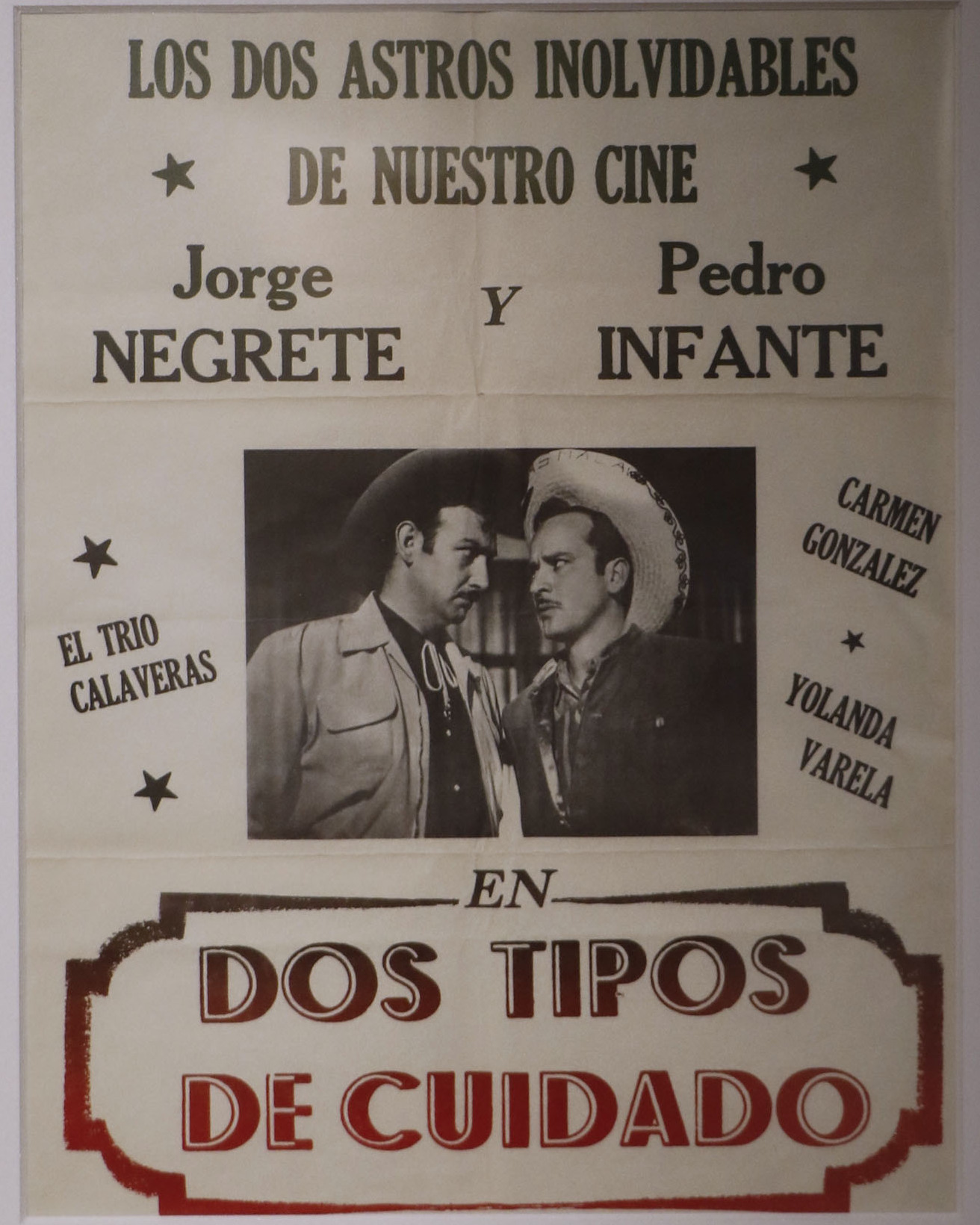
- Film poster
- Directed by: Ismael Rodríguez
- Starring: Pedro Infante, Jorge Negrete, Yolanda Varela, Carmelita González
- Music by: Carlos Orellana
- Release date: 1953
- Country: Mexico
- Language: Spanish

Dos tipos de cuidado ("Two Guys To Be Afraid Of") is a 1953 Mexican comedy film directed by Ismael Rodríguez and starring Pedro Infante, Jorge Negrete, Yolanda Varela and Carmelita González.

== Plot ==
It is the story of two best friends: Pedro Malo and Jorge Bueno. They dated María (Jorge's sister) and Rosario (Pedro's cousin) together and were happy couples. One year has passed and the couples are no longer together. Jorge took his car to a service station when an old friend told him that Pedro had returned to the village. They are no longer friends—in fact, they are enemies because Pedro, a short time ago, married Jorge's girlfriend and Pedro's own cousin, Rosario.

== Cast ==
- Pedro Infante as Pedro Malo
- Jorge Negrete as Jorge Bueno
- Yolanda Varela as María
- Carmelita González as Rosario
- Carlos Orellana as Don Elías
- José Elías Moreno as El General
- Queta Lavat as Genoveva
- Arturo Soto Rangel as
- Mimí Derba as Josefa, madre de Jorge
- Manuel Noriega as Doctor de Rosario (as Manolo Noriega)
