= El hombre y el monstruo =

The Man and the Monster
- Directed by: Rafael Baledón
- Written by: Alfredo Salazar (Adaptation); Raúl Zenteno (Story)
- Produced by: Abel Salazar
- Starring: Enrique Rambal; Abel Salazar; Martha Roth; Ofelia Guilmáin
- Music by: Gustavo César Carrión
- Release date: 1958
- Running time: 78 minutes
- Country: Mexico
- Language: Spanish

The Man and the Monster (Spanish: El hombre y el monstruo) is a 1958 Mexican horror film, directed by Rafael Baledón.

== Plot summary ==
The film is about a pianist who sells his soul to the Devil in order to become the greatest pianist over the world. But, every time a particular piece of music is played by him -Piano Concerto No. 1 (Tchaikovsky)-, he transforms into a murderous monster.

== Reception ==
According to the website Classic-Horror:

"Intelligently dubbed (it looks like they hired a translator AND a screenwriter), marvelously acted, and nicely directed, there's not a lot The Man and the Monster isn't, except, perhaps, expensive."
