= The Remarkable Miss Tuttle =

1942 old-time radio series

- Other names: The Private Life of Josephine Tuttle; The Remarkable Miss Crandall
- Running time: 30 minutes
- Country of origin: United States
- Language: English
- Syndicates: NBC
- Starring: Edna May Oliver
- Announcer: Harlow Wilcox
- Written by: Martin Gosch, Howard Harris
- Produced by: Murray Bolan
- Original release: July 5 – August 30, 1942
- No. of series: 1
- No. of episodes: 9
- Sponsored by: Lever Brothers (Rinso soap washing powder)

The Remarkable Miss Tuttle is an old-time radio series which ran on NBC in 1942. It was a light comedy-drama which aired Sunday nights at 7 p.m. EWT, serving as a summer replacement for The Jack Benny Program.

== Format ==
Character actress Edna May Oliver played Miss Josephine Tuttle, an elderly woman "possessed of a boundless desire to help people", who unfortunately often "sticks her nose into others' business with the best intentions, trying to get people out of trouble, and invariably getting them in deeper".

== Personnel ==
Regular cast members included Arnold Stang as Miss Tuttle's nephew, Bobby, and Cy Kendall as Judge Carter. Sharon Douglas played Betsy, Bobby's girlfriend. Lillian Randolph played Ramona, Miss Tuttle's housekeeper. Harlow Wilcox was the program's announcer and the show's music director was Leith Stevens.

== Production ==
Edna May Oliver did an audition recording (the radio equivalent of a television pilot) in early 1942. The initial title for the series was The Private Life of Josephine Tuttle. The show was picked up for a 13-week summer run, and it began on July 5, 1942. It was scheduled to run until September 27 and then be replaced by the returning The Jack Benny Program.

But Oliver was only able to do two episodes of the series before illness forced her off the show. In response to Oliver's absence, the July 19th episode brought in actress Mary Boland as Miss Tuttle's sister, with Boland taking on the lead role. Mary Boland and Edna May Oliver were friends who had already known each other for years, dating as far back as 1925 when they both starred in the comic play Cradle Snatchers. When it became apparent that Oliver would not return, on August 23 the name of the show was changed to The Remarkable Miss Crandall, with Mary Boland now playing the lead as Miss Crandall.

This new version only lasted for two weeks, with the final episode airing on August 30, 1942. Thus only nine of the show's planned thirteen episodes were produced. So during September the remaining four weeks were instead used for the premiere of Lionel Barrymore's new series, Mayor of the Town. After Mayor's brief 4-week run on NBC it immediately moved over to CBS Radio where it enjoyed a long run.
