= Fog Island =

1945 film by Terry O. Morse

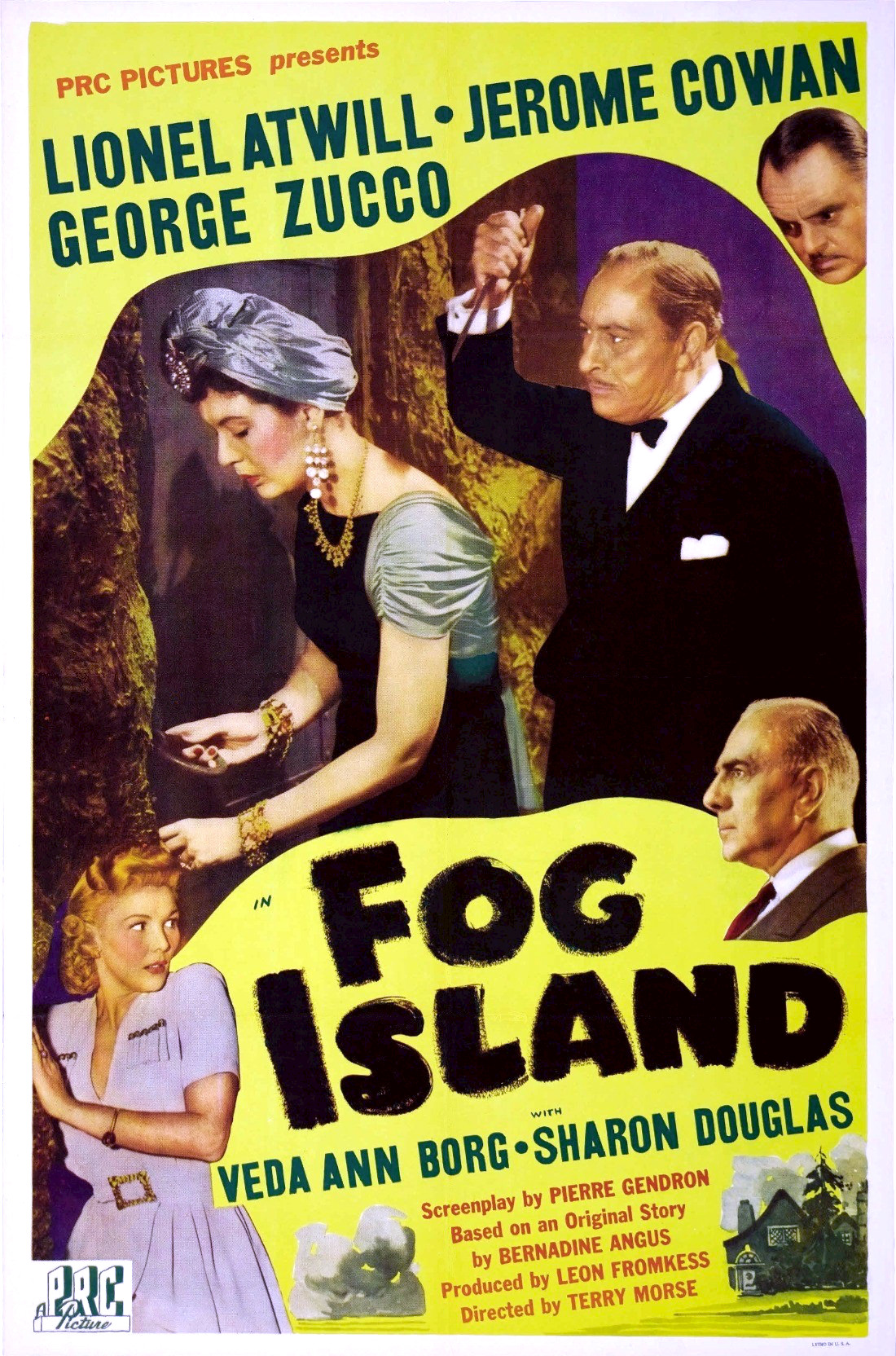
- Directed by: Terry O. Morse
- Written by: Pierre Gendron (screenplay); Bernadine Angus (play Angel Island)
- Produced by: Terry O. Morse (associate producer); Leon Fromkess (producer)
- Starring: See below
- Cinematography: Ira H. Morgan
- Edited by: George McGuire
- Music by: Karl Hajos
- Distributed by: Producers Releasing Corporation
- Release date: February 15, 1945 (United States)
- Running time: 72 minutes
- Country: United States
- Language: English

Fog Island is a 1945 American mystery-suspense film directed by Terry O. Morse. The film stars B movie horror film regulars George Zucco and Lionel Atwill. It was based on the 1937 play Angel Island by Bernadine "Bernie" Angus.

== Plot ==
A recent ex convict named Leo Grainer lives secluded on Fog Island with the daughter of his murdered wife. Seeking to learn who murdered her, and to exact revenge on those who framed him and destroyed his business, he invites his former associates to his creepy island mansion on the pretext he may share a hidden fortune with them.

Prior to their arrival he rigs the mansion with secret passages and a trap. Then, once his guests arrive, he gives each a clue, including his step daughter and butler. This successfully pits everyone against the others and plays on their greed. What then transpires is conflict, revealed mysteries, sudden death, and an unlikely resolution.

== Cast ==
- Lionel Atwill as Alec Ritchfield
- George Zucco as Leo Grainer
- Jerome Cowan as Kavanaugh
- Sharon Douglas as Gail
- Veda Ann Borg as Sylvia
- John Whitney as Jeff
- Jacqueline deWit as Emiline Bronson
- Ian Keith as Dr. Lake
- George Lloyd as Allerton - Butler

== Production ==
The rights to the play on which the film was based had been sold by The New York World-Telegram for $30,000. But, this is highly suspect as it became a PRC Release and the studio would only give less than $200 to writers for the final script. The film's sets were designed by the art director Paul Palmentola.

== Soundtrack ==
- Sharon Douglas and Karl Hajos - "Liebestraum (Love's Dream)" by Franz Liszt.

== Critical reception ==
Allmovie noted "An early low-budget spin on Ten Little Indians," calling it "cheap but entertaining."
