= Tehuantepec (film) =

1954 film by Miguel Contreras Torres

- Directed by: Miguel Contreras Torres
- Written by: Miguel Contreras Torres
- Produced by: Miguel Contreras Torres
- Starring: Katy Jurado; Gustavo Rojo; Enrique Rambal
- Cinematography: Jack Draper
- Edited by: Charles L. Kimball
- Music by: Raúl Lavista
- Production company: Hispano Continental Films
- Release date: 7 October 1954
- Running time: 110 minutes
- Country: Mexico
- Language: Spanish

Tehuantepec is a 1954 Mexican historical drama film directed by Miguel Contreras Torres and starring Katy Jurado, Gustavo Rojo and Enrique Rambal.

== Plot ==
In the early twentieth century a railway is constructed across Tehuantepec to try and compete with the Panama Canal which was also under construction.

== Cast ==
In alphabetical order

- Manuel Arvide
- Victorio Blanco
- Manuel Calvo
- Pedro Elviro
- Eduardo Fajardo
- Pedro Galván
- Enrique García Álvarez
- Eduardo González Pliego
- Gilberto González
- Enrique Iñigo
- Katy Jurado
- José Muñoz
- Manuel Noriega
- Diana Ochoa
- Polo Ortín
- Consuelo Pastor
- Ismael Pérez
- Enrique Rambal
- Tracey Roberts
- Gustavo Rojo
- Domingo Soler
- Jorge Treviño

== Bibliography ==
- Quinlan, David. Quinlan's Film Stars. Batsford, 2000.
