= Yolanda Varela =

Mexican actress

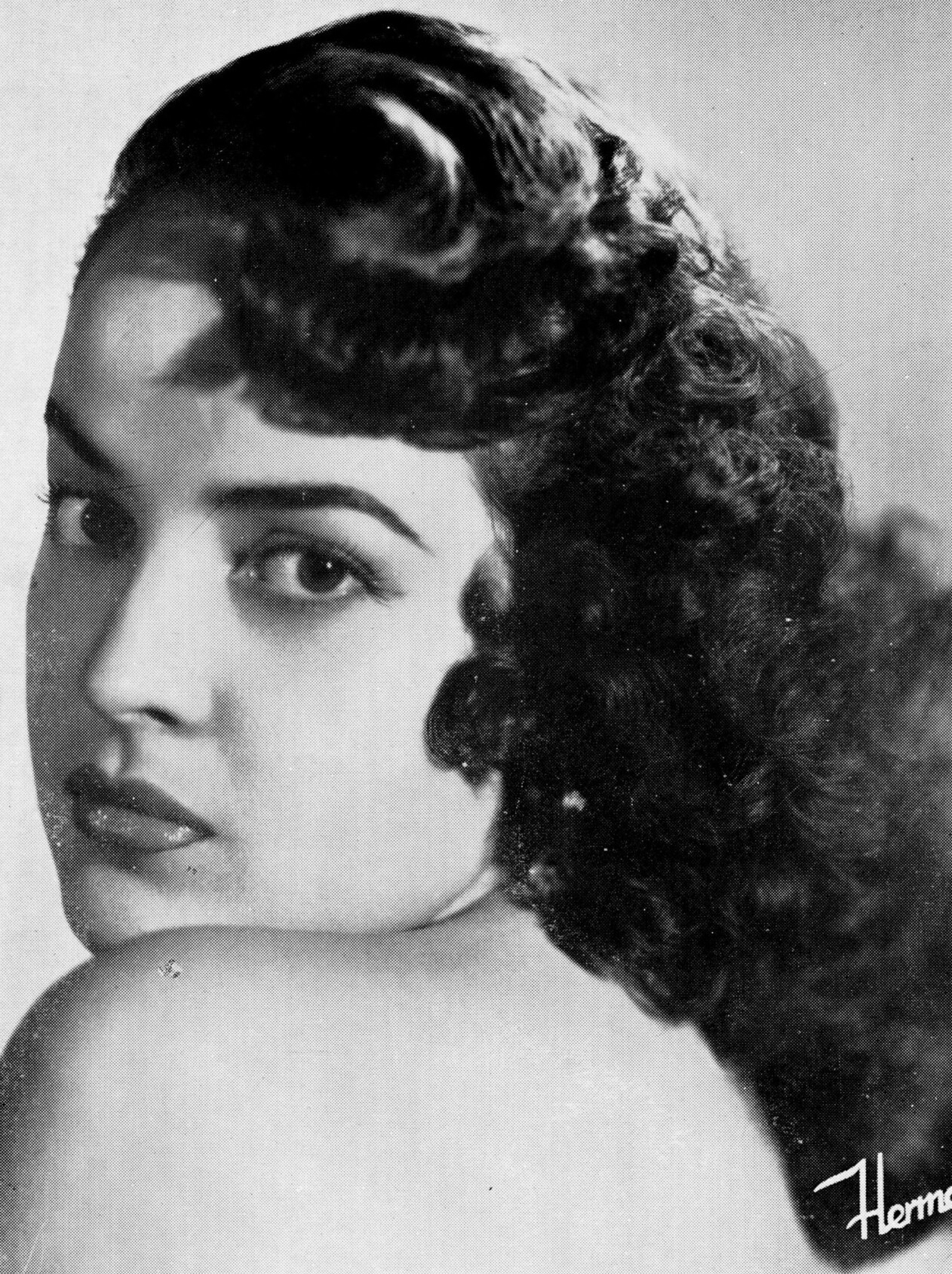
Yolanda Varela in 1954

Yolanda Varela was a Mexican actress. Born in Mexico City on 30 March 1930, she started acting at a very early age. She studied ballet in the National Institute of the Performing Arts. Varela was the leading actress in many Mexican films and some Spanish/Mexican co-productions.

Among her more important films were: Dos tipos de cuidado (1953), Llamas Contra el Viento and El Niño y el Muro (1965). She co-starred with such actors as Daniel Gélin, Arturo de Córdova, Jorge Mistral, Manolo Fabregas, Ernesto Alonso, Pedro Vargas, Fernando Soler, Resortes, Clavillazo, German Valdez Tintan Enrique Rambal, Miguel Aceves Mejía, Joaquín Cordero, among others.

== Personal life and death ==
She met her husband, the film producer Fernando de Fuentes Reyes, while working for him on the movie Lo que le Paso a Sanson. She died on 29 August 2009 of natural causes.

== Filmography ==
- Departamento de Soltero (1971)
- El Niño y el Muro (1965)
- The White Sister (1960)
- Love in the Shadows (1960)
- Three Black Angels (1960)
- La Casa del Terror (1960)
- Isla para Dos (1959)
- El Derecho à la Vida (1959)
- Los Hijos del Divorcio (1958)
- Quiero ser Artista (1958)
- Escuela de Rateros (1958)
- Locos Peligrosos (1957)
- Violencia en la Noche (1957)
- Los Amantes' (1956)
- Llamas Contra el Viento (1956)
- La Herida Luminosa (1956)
- Viva la Juventud! (1956)
- Barefoot Sultan (1956)
- Con Quién Andan Nuestras Hijas (1956)
- Una Movida Chueca (1956)
- El 7 Leguas (1955)
- Look What Happened to Samson
- Fuerza de los Humildes (1955)
- La Sombra de Cruz Diablo (1955)
- Al Diablo las Mujeres (1955)
- ¿Mujer... o Fiera? (1954)
- Dos tipos de Cuidado (1953)
- Acuérdate de vivir (1953)
- Prefiero a tu Papá..! (1952)
- Escuela para Casadas (1949)
- Recuerdos de mi Valle (1946)

== Sources ==
- Agrasánchez Jr., Rogelio (2001). Bellezas del cine mexicano/Beauties of Mexican Cinema. Archivo Fílmico Agrasánchez. ISBN 968-5077-11-8.
