= Father Against Son =

1955 film

- Directed by: Juan Bustillo Oro
- Written by: Carlos Arniches (play); Juan Bustillo Oro; Antonio Helú
- Produced by: Jesús Grovas
- Starring: Manolo Fábregas; Julio Villarreal; Silvia Derbez
- Cinematography: Manuel Gómez Urquiza
- Edited by: Gloria Schoemann
- Production company: Tele Talia Films
- Release date: 24 August 1955
- Running time: 90 minutes
- Country: Mexico
- Language: Spanish

Father Against Son (Spanish: Padre contra hijo) is a 1955 Mexican drama film directed by Juan Bustillo Oro and starring Manolo Fábregas, Julio Villarreal and Silvia Derbez. The film's sets were designed by the art director Javier Torres Torija.

== Cast ==
- Manolo Fábregas as Juan de Dios
- Julio Villarreal as Don Cecilio García
- Silvia Derbez as Lucía
- Fanny Schiller as Tía Domitila
- Miguel Manzano as Señor cura
- Agustín Isunza as Toribio
- Emilio Garibay as Santiago
- José Muñoz as Sargento Sánchez
- María Gentil Arcos as Eloisa Ruiz, madre de Juan de Dios
- Lupe Inclán as Fermina, sirvienta
- Antonio Raxel as Damián
- Jorge Arriaga as El metralleta
- Rafael Estrada as Esteban
- Víctor Torres as Francisco
- Virginia Sánchez Navarro as Caridad
- Emilio Brillas as Conductor tren
- Elodia Hernández as Doña Marianita
- Hernán Vera as Empleado tren

== Bibliography ==
- Amador, María Luisa. Cartelera cinematográfica, 1950-1959. UNAM, 1985.
- Stock, Anne Marie (ed.) Framing Latin American Cinema: Contemporary Critical Perspectives. University of Minnesota Press, 1997.
