= The Murderer X =

1955 film

- Directed by: Juan Bustillo Oro
- Written by: Alfredo del Diestro (play); Juan Bustillo Oro; Antonio Helú
- Produced by: Adolfo Grovas; Jesús Grovas
- Starring: Carlos López Moctezuma; Manolo Fábregas; Prudencia Grifell
- Cinematography: Raúl Martínez Solares
- Edited by: Gloria Schoemann
- Music by: Raúl Lavista
- Production company: Tele Talia Films
- Release date: 18 March 1955
- Running time: 104 minutes
- Country: Mexico
- Language: Spanish

The Murderer X (Spanish: El asesino X) is a 1955 Mexican crime thriller film directed by Juan Bustillo Oro and starring Carlos López Moctezuma, Manolo Fábregas and Prudencia Grifell. It was shot at the Clasa Studios in Mexico City. The film's sets were designed by the art director Javier Torres Torija. Stylistically a film noir, it is set in the United States with a plot revolving around amnesia.

== Cast ==
- Carlos López Moctezuma as Alcalde Harrison García
- Manolo Fábregas as Carlos Encinas
- Prudencia Grifell as Señora Encinas
- Maricruz Olivier as María Encinas
- Miguel Ángel Ferriz as Juez
- Miguel Manzano as Fiscal
- Rafael Banquells as Sargento Ralph Curtis
- Lupe Inclán as Chona
- Antonio Raxel as Teniente Roland
- Fernando Mendoza as Doctor
- Arturo Soto Rangel as Padre Juan
- José Muñoz as Inspector González
- Salvador Lozano as Amigo de Robert Francis
- Chel López as Detective
- Rafael Estrada as Elevadorista
- Jorge Arriaga as Jack Richards
- Humberto Rodríguez as Empleado corte

== Bibliography ==
- Brill, Olaf (ed.) Expressionism in the Cinema. Edinburgh University Press, 2016.
- Reyes, Alvaro A. Fernández . Crimen y suspenso en el cine mexicano 1946-1955. El Colegio de Michoacán, 2007.
