= For Sale by Exorcist =

2025 comedy horror film by Melissa LaMartina

- Official release poster
- Directed by: Melissa LaMartina
- Written by: Chris LaMartina; Rob Walker
- Produced by: Carlo Glorioso; Chris LaMartina; Melissa LaMartina; Cory Okouchi; Eduardo Sanchez
- Starring: Helenmary Ball; Julian Ball; Emily Classen; John Dimes; Tatiana Ford
- Production company: Epic Pictures
- Release date: March 11, 2025
- Running time: 82 minutes
- Country: United States
- Language: English

For Sale by Exorcist is a 2025 American comedy horror mockumentary film co-written by Chris LaMartina and Rob Walker, directed by Melissa LaMartina in her directorial debut. It stars Helenmary Ball, Julian Ball, Emily Classen, John Dimes and Tatiana Ford.

== Plot ==
The film follows Susan Price (Emily Classen), a spirited Southern realtor who has carved out a unique niche, flipping haunted houses. With her thick country accent and quirky expressions like “madder than a wet hen,” Susan combines her real estate expertise with exorcism skills to cleanse properties of their supernatural inhabitants before selling them. Her unconventional approach has made her a sought-after figure in the housing market, especially for clients dealing with paranormal issues.

The film, documents Susan's daily routines, showcasing her interactions with clients and the various haunted properties she handles. From bleeding walls to glowing eyes, each house presents its own set of challenges, which Susan tackles with a mix of humor and determination.

After years on the road, living out of motels and constantly moving from one haunted house to another, Susan yearns for stability. She decides it's time to find her own “forever home.” However, her plans are thwarted when Amanda Duncan, a television real estate mogul, outbids her for her dream property. Determined not to give up, Susan strikes a devil's bargain to reclaim the house, setting off a chain of events that blur the lines between her professional and personal life.

As Susan settles into her new home, she begins to experience unsettling phenomena. The spirits she had previously evicted from other properties return, seeking revenge. These hauntings escalate from minor disturbances to life-threatening encounters, forcing Susan to confront the consequences of her past actions. She enlists the help of Father Doyle (John Dimes), a foul-mouthed priest with whom she shares a contentious yet effective working relationship. Together, they face off against a variety of supernatural entities, including a groin-grabbing succubus and death-metal necromancers.

Often poking fun at real estate and paranormal investigation tropes. Susan making interactions with her goth couple clients named Kassandra and Lucian. Susan confronts the vengeful spirits in a final showdown that tests her resolve and skills. With the support of her allies, she manages to banish the entities, reclaiming her home and finding a sense of peace.

== Cast ==
- Helenmary Ball
- Julian Ball
- Emily Classen
- John Dimes
- Tatiana Ford

== Production ==
In an interview of No film School, Melissa LaMartina shared how's the preproduction of the film, she said;

Once we got the green light, our first step was to go back to the script and analyze it against the parameters of the budget and the production schedule. The model the studio was following was for principal photography to be 15 days. Chris and I went through the script and slashed scenes, characters, and an entire subplot. It ultimately served us well—having to take a scalpel to the script made for a nice lean romp of a movie.

She also shared that they're using Sony FS7s to shoot the film.

== Release ==
The film was released in Digital and VOD on March 11, 2025, under Epic Pictures.

== Reception ==
Jim Morazzini of Nerdly gave the film a rating of 2 over 5 and wrote; With some sharper writing and a better budget For Sale by Exorcist could have been a winner, instead it’s merely a painless way to kill ninety minutes.

Rebecca of Film Carnage rated the film a rating of 7/10 and she said; For Sale by Exorcist doesn’t actually have that many exorcisms but it does have a fantastic leading character who is brought to life excellently and charmingly by Emily Classen.

Giving a score of 7.5, Wyatt Towns of Vogue Horror wrote; Smartly written script, with the vast majority of the jokes landing right where they need to but might be too absurd for some.
