= Love in the Shadows (film) =

1960 film

- Directed by: Tito Davison
- Produced by: Felipe Mier
- Starring: Libertad Lamarque; Yolanda Varela; Enrique Rambal
- Cinematography: Jack Draper
- Edited by: Rafael Ceballos
- Music by: Manuel Esperón
- Release date: 24 November 1960
- Running time: 109 minutes
- Country: Mexico
- Language: Spanish

Love in the Shadows (Spanish:Amor en la sombra) is a 1960 Mexican drama film directed by Tito Davison and starring Libertad Lamarque, Yolanda Varela and Enrique Rambal.

== Cast ==
- Libertad Lamarque as Claudia Montes
- Yolanda Varela as Mariela Morán
- Enrique Rambal as Octavio Morán
- Nadia Haro Oliva as Doña Mercedes
- Tony Carbajal as Patricio
- Hortensia Santoveña as Rosario
- Miguel Manzano as Don Alberto
- Antonio Bravo as Empresario
- Armando Acosta as Mesero
- Daniel Arroyo as Hombre en funeral
- Sara Cabrera as Señorita Sarita Hernández, secretaria
- Jorge Chesterking as Hombre en cabaret
- Roberto Corell as Amigo del empresario
- Felipe de Flores as Anunciador cabaret
- Rafael María de Labra as Reportero
- Felipe del Castillo as Empleado hotel
- Enrique Díaz Indiano as Ramón, médico
- Roy Fletcher as Anunciador cabaret II
- José Loza as Empleado estudio
- Chel López as Reportero
- Alejandra Meyer as Lupita, sirvienta
- Consuelo Monteagudo as Otilia, sirvienta
- Guillermo Rivas as Reportero
- Ángela Rodríguez as Carmen, sirvienta
- Rafael Torres as Chofer
- Manuel Trejo Morales as Hombre en camerino

== Bibliography ==
- Emilio García Riera. Historia documental del cine mexicano: 1959-1960. Universidad de Guadalajara, 1994.
