= Where the Circle Ends =

1956 Mexican film by Alfredo B. Crevenna

- Directed by: Alfredo B. Crevenna
- Written by: Alfredo B. Crevenna; José Revueltas; Luis Spota
- Produced by: Adolfo Lagos
- Starring: Sara Montiel; Raúl Ramírez; Nadia Haro Oliva
- Cinematography: Rosalío Solano
- Edited by: Gloria Schoemann
- Music by: Lan Adomian
- Production company: Cinematográfica Latina
- Distributed by: Azteca Films
- Release date: 11 April 1956
- Running time: 90 minutes
- Country: Mexico
- Language: Spanish

Where the Circle Ends (Spanish: Donde el círculo termina) is a 1956 Mexican crime film directed by Alfredo B. Crevenna and starring Sara Montiel, Raúl Ramírez and Nadia Haro Oliva. It was shot at the Churubusco Studios in Mexico City. The film's sets were designed by the art director Edward Fitzgerald.

== Cast ==
- Sara Montiel as Isabel
- Raúl Ramírez as Raúl del Río
- Nadia Haro Oliva as Gabriela
- Jorge Martínez de Hoyos as Inspector Carlos Carrillo
- Rafael Estrada as Miguel
- Antonio Raxel as Sr. Vélez
- Armando Arriola as Martínez
- Daniel Arroyo as Miembro del consejo
- Javier de la Parra as Enrique
- Jaime Jiménez Pons as Mozo
- Humberto Rodríguez as Hombre toma inventario
- Fernando Torre Laphame as Joaquín Valverde
- Yolanda Vázquez as Domitila, sirventa
- Amado Zumaya as Profesor forense

== Bibliography ==
- Rogelio Agrasánchez. Cine Mexicano: Posters from the Golden Age, 1936-1956. Chronicle Books, 2001.
