= Arm in Arm Down the Street (1966 film) =

- Directed by: Enrique Carreras
- Written by: Ariel Cortazzo, Armando Mook (play)
- Cinematography: Antonio Merayo
- Edited by: Jorge Gárate
- Music by: Tito Ribero
- Release date: 4 August 1966
- Running time: 95 minutes
- Countries: Argentina, Spain
- Language: Spanish

Arm in Arm Down the Street (Spanish: Del brazo y por la calle) is a 1966 Argentine and Spanish comedy-drama film directed by Enrique Carreras and starring Rodolfo Bebán, Evangelina Salazar and Susana Campos. It won the Silver Condor Award for Best Film, given by the Argentine Film Critics Association in 1967 for the best picture of the previous year.

== Cast ==
- Rodolfo Bebán
- Evangelina Salazar
- Susana Campos
- Enzo Viena
- Luis Tasca
- Maruja Gil Quesada
- Javier Portales
- Lilian Valmar
- Rodolfo López Ervilha
- Mirtha Dabner
