= Armando Mook =

Chilean writer and playwright

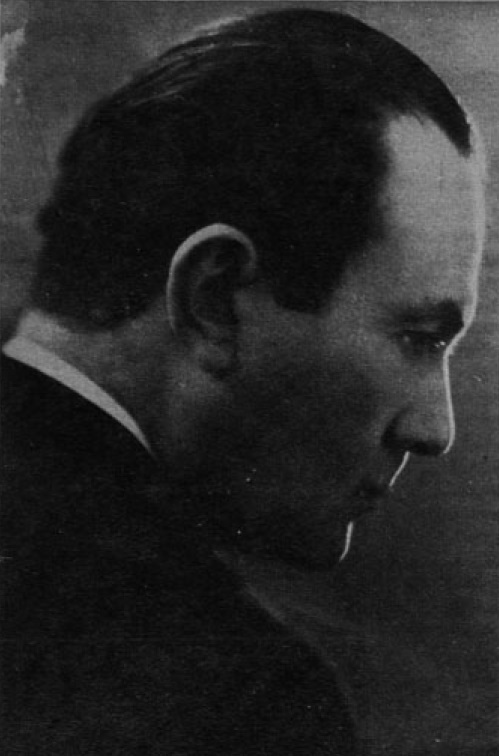
Armando Moock Bousquet (Santiago, January 9, 1894 - Buenos Aires, November 30, 1942) was a Chilean writer and playwright.

Armando Mook, also Armando Moock Bousquet, (1894 in Santiago – 1942 in Buenos Aires) was a Chilean writer and playwright. He wrote the play Arm in Arm Down the Street, which was adapted into films in 1956 and 1966. Other works include Los demonios (1917) and La Serpiente (1919). La Serpiente (also La Serpierde; "The Serpent") is considered his best work. He was a contemporary of Germán Luco Cruchaga.
