= Mario Navarro =

Mexican actor (born 1949)

Mario Navarro (May 28, 1949 – January 27, 2023) was a Mexican actor, active in the 1950s and 1960s. He made his film debut in 1956 playing a leading role in The Road of Life, following in the same year with The Beast of Hollow Mountain. In 1960 he appeared in the TV series Captain David Grief in the episode Everybody's Boy. He later had small roles in Hollywood movies such as The Black Scorpion (1957), The Magnificent Seven (1960) and Geronimo (1962). Navarro died aged 73 on January 27, 2023.

== Filmography ==
Year	Title	Role	Notes
1956	The Road of Life	Luis	
1956	The Beast of Hollow Mountain	Panchito	
1957	The Black Scorpion	Juanito	
1958	Villa!!	Pajarito	
1958	Bolero inmortal	Jorge Jr.	
1959	Ferias de México		
1959	Nacida para amar		
1960	El misterio de la cobra (Carlos Lacroix en la India)	Jai Sing	
1960	The Magnificent Seven	Boy with O'Reilly #1	
1962	Geronimo	Giantah	
1965	Los tres farsante		(final film role)
