= Manolo Fábregas =

Mexican actor (1921–1996)

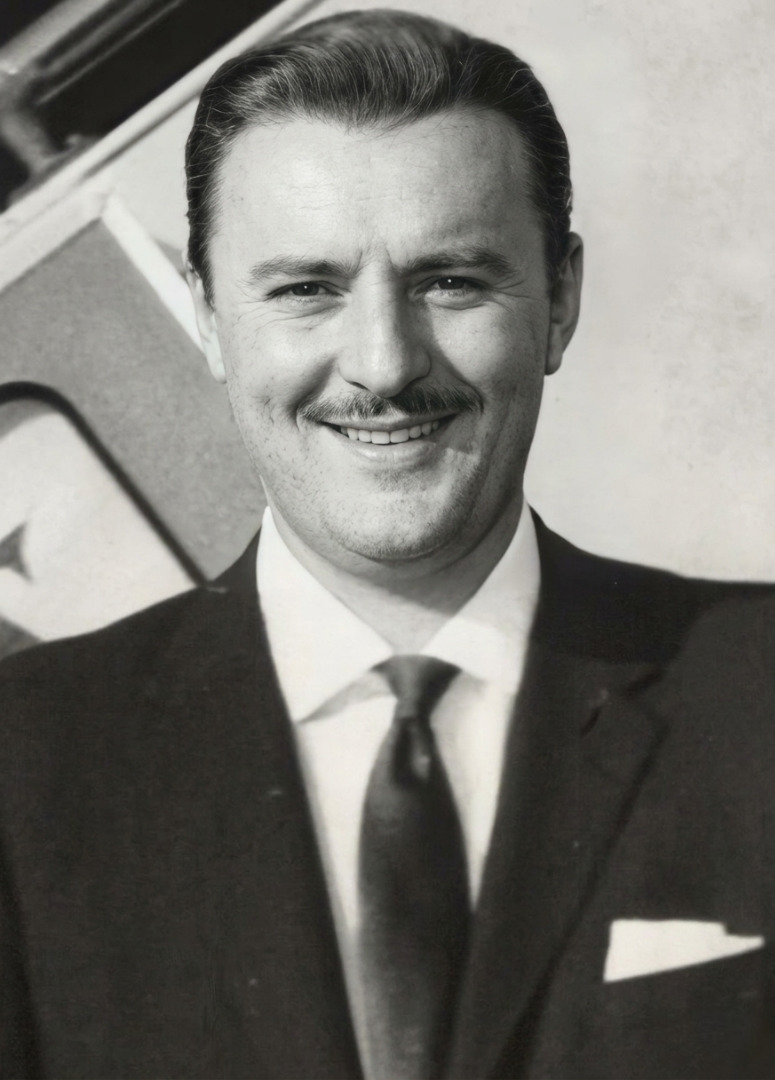
- Fábregas in 1958
- Born: 15 July 1921; Vigo, Galicia, Spain
- Died: 4 February 1996 (aged 74); Mexico City, Mexico
- Other names: Manuel Sánchez Navarro
- Occupation: Actor
- Years active: 1934–1996
- Spouse: Fela Fabregas
- Children: 5
- Parent(s): Manuel Sánchez-Navarro Fábregas; Fanny Schiller
- Relatives: Virginia Fábregas (grandmother)

Manolo Fábregas (15 July 1921 – 4 February 1996) was a Mexican film actor. His grandmother was Virginia Fábregas while his mother was Fanny Schiller.

== Filmography ==
Year	Title	Role	Notes
1934	Pecados de amor		
1935	Madre querida		
1939	The Cemetery of the Eagles	Fernando Montes de Oca (Vicente Suárez)	
1939	Una luz en mi camino	Fernando	
1940	A Macabre Legacy	Tato	
1942	Mil estudiantes y una muchacha	Abelardo / Susanita	
1942	Del rancho a la capital	Julián de la Fuente	
1942	Virgen de medianoche		
1942	Simón Bolívar	Fernando Bolívar	
1942	El ángel negro	Jorge - adulto	
1942	Casa de mujeres		
1944	Como todas las madres		
1944	El intruso	José Manuel hijo	
1945	The Shack	Tonet	
1945	The White Monk	Piero	Uncredited
1945	Lo que va de ayer a hoy		
1945	La mujer legítima	Ángel	
1945	La casa de la zorra	Joven borracho casa de juegos	
1946	La culpable	Carlos	
1946	Ocho hombres y una mujer		
1947	The Tiger of Jalisco	Eduardo	
1948	I Am Your Father	Paco	
1948	La casa de la Troya	Panduriño	
1948	Dueña y señora	Lalo	
1948	Aunt Candela		
1949	The Perez Family	Luis Robles del Valle	
1949	Night Arrival	Fernando	
1950	Woman to Woman	Javier	
1950	Saturday Night	Príncipe Florencio	
1951	Arrabalera	Felipe	
1951	Women Without Tomorrow	Willy Stevens	
1952	Salón de baile	Raúl	
1952	The Martyr of Calvary	Judas	
1952	La miel se fue de la luna	Ricardo	
1952	Las interesadas	Raúl Mendoza	
1953	Pompeyo el conquistador	Carlos	
1953	Captain Scarlett	The Duke de Corlaine	
1953	No te ofendas, Beatriz	Mario	
1953	The Sixth Race		
1953	Piel canela	Dr. Carlos Alonso	
1953	Reportaje	Rafael Galindo, reporter	
1954	The Three Elenas	Luis Araiza	
1954	La visita que no tocó el timbre	Juan Villanova	
1955	The Murderer X	Carlos Encinas	
1955	Father Against Son	Juan de Dios	
1955	Sólo para maridos		
1955	La mujer ajena		
1956	Arm in Arm Down the Street	Alberto	
1956	The Medallion Crime	Raúl González	
1958	Préstame tu cuerpo	Manuel	
1959	El derecho a la vida	Dr. Luis Cordova	
1959	Las señoritas Vivanco	Inspector	
1960	Dormitorio para señoritas	Carlos	
1961	El proceso de las señoritas Vivanco	Jorge Saldaña / Ernestito	
1966	Despedida de soltera		
1967	La isla de los dinosaurios	Profesor	
1969	The Candy Man	Lt. Garcia	
1969	Persíguelas y alcanzalas	Eric	
1970	Two Mules for Sister Sara	Colonel Beltran	
1970	La hermana Trinquete	Fernando	
1971	Espérame en Siberia, vida mía		
1972	National Mechanics	Eufemio	
1979	Broken Flag	Eduardo Vallejo Arizpe	
1981	Lagunilla mi barrio	Don Abel	
1982	Lagunilla 2	Don Abel	

== Bibliography ==
- Mora, Carl J. Mexican Cinema: Reflections of a Society, 1896-2004. McFarland, 2005.
