= The Road of Life (film) =

1956 film

- Directed by: Alfonso Corona Blake
- Written by: Eduardo Landeta; Matilde Landeta
- Produced by: Ángel de la Fuente
- Starring: Mario Navarro
- Cinematography: José Ortiz Ramos
- Edited by: Carlos Savage
- Release date: 29 June 1956
- Running time: 96 minutes
- Country: Mexico
- Language: Spanish

The Road of Life (Spanish: El camino de la vida) is a 1956 Mexican drama film directed by Alfonso Corona Blake. At the 6th Berlin International Film Festival it won the Honourable Mention award for the director.

== Cast ==
- Luis Alba
- Guillermo Bravo Sosa
- Antonio Brillas
- José Chávez
- Rafael Estrada
- Carmen Funés
- Eufrosina García
- Guido García
- Ignacio García Torres
- Rafael González
- Mario Humberto Jiménez Pons
- Rogelio 'Frijolitos' Jiménez Pons
- Enrique Lucero
- Miguel Manzano
- Roberto Meyer
- Eduardo Moreno
- Inés Murillo
- Mario Navarro
- Ismael Pérez
- Víctor Pérez
