= Arm in Arm Down the Street (1956 film) =

1956 film by Juan Bustillo Oro

- Directed by: Juan Bustillo Oro
- Written by: Armando Mook (play), Juan Bustillo Oro, Antonio Helú
- Produced by: Adolfo Grovas (executive producer), Jesús Grovas (producer)
- Cinematography: Ezequiel Carrasco
- Edited by: Gloria Schoemann
- Music by: Raúl Lavista
- Production company: Tele Talia Films
- Release date: 2 February 1956
- Running time: 100 minutes
- Country: Mexico
- Language: Spanish

Arm in Arm Down the Street (Spanish: Del brazo y por la calle) is a 1956 Mexican romantic drama film directed by Juan Bustillo Oro, based on a play by Armando Mook. It stars Marga López, Manuel Fábregas, and Carlos Ortigoza.
