= The Medallion Crime =

1956 film

- Directed by: Juan Bustillo Oro
- Written by: Juan Bustillo Oro; Antonio Helú
- Produced by: Adolfo Grovas; Jesús Grovas
- Starring: Rosario Granados; Manolo Fábregas; Rita Macedo
- Cinematography: Ezequiel Carrasco
- Edited by: Gloria Schoemann
- Music by: Raúl Lavista
- Production company: Tele Talia Films
- Distributed by: Azteca Films
- Release date: 10 May 1956
- Running time: 93 minutes
- Country: Mexico
- Language: Spanish

The Medallion Crime (Spanish: El medallón del crimen) is a 1956 Mexican mystery crime thriller film directed by Juan Bustillo Oro and starring Rosario Granados, Manolo Fábregas and Rita Macedo. It was shot at the Clasa Studios in Mexico City. The film's sets were designed by the art director Javier Torres Torija. It was one of several film noirs directed by Bustillo Oro.

== Cast ==
- Rosario Granados as María González
- Manolo Fábregas as Raúl González
- Rita Macedo as María Álvarez
- Silvia Derbez as Carmen Álvarez
- Wolf Ruvinskis as Ramón Torres
- Eduardo Alcaraz as Ramiro
- Manuel Arvide as Jefe de policía
- Rafael Banquells as Valle
- Miguel Córcega as Ricardo Solares
- Jorgito Kreutzmann as Carlitos
- Fernando Mendoza as Carmona
- Celia Manzano as Esposa de Ricardo
- Rafael Estrada as Rafael
- José Muñoz as López, agente de policía
- Josefina Leiner as Boticaria
- Salvador Quiroz as Compañero de trabajo de Raúl
- Carlos Robles Gil as Inquilino edificio
- Quintín Bulnes as Cantinero

== Bibliography ==
- Brill, Olaf (ed.) Expressionism in the Cinema. Edinburgh University Press, 2016.
- Riera, Emilio García. Historia documental del cine mexicano: 1955-1956. Universidad de Guadalajara, 1993
