= Alfonso Corona Blake =

Mexican film director (1919–1999)

- Born: 2 January 1919; Autlan, Mexico
- Died: 21 January 1999 (aged 80); Mexico
- Occupations: Film director Screenwriter
- Years active: 1937-1971

Alfonso Corona Blake (2 January 1919 – 21 January 1999) was a Mexican film director and screenwriter. He directed 27 films between 1956 and 1971. His film The Road of Life won the Honourable Mention (Director) award at the 6th Berlin International Film Festival.

== Selected filmography ==
- The Road of Life (1956)
- Happiness (1957)
- El mundo de los vampiros (1961)
- Santo vs. las Mujeres Vampiro (1962)
