= Nadia Haro Oliva =

Fencer and actress

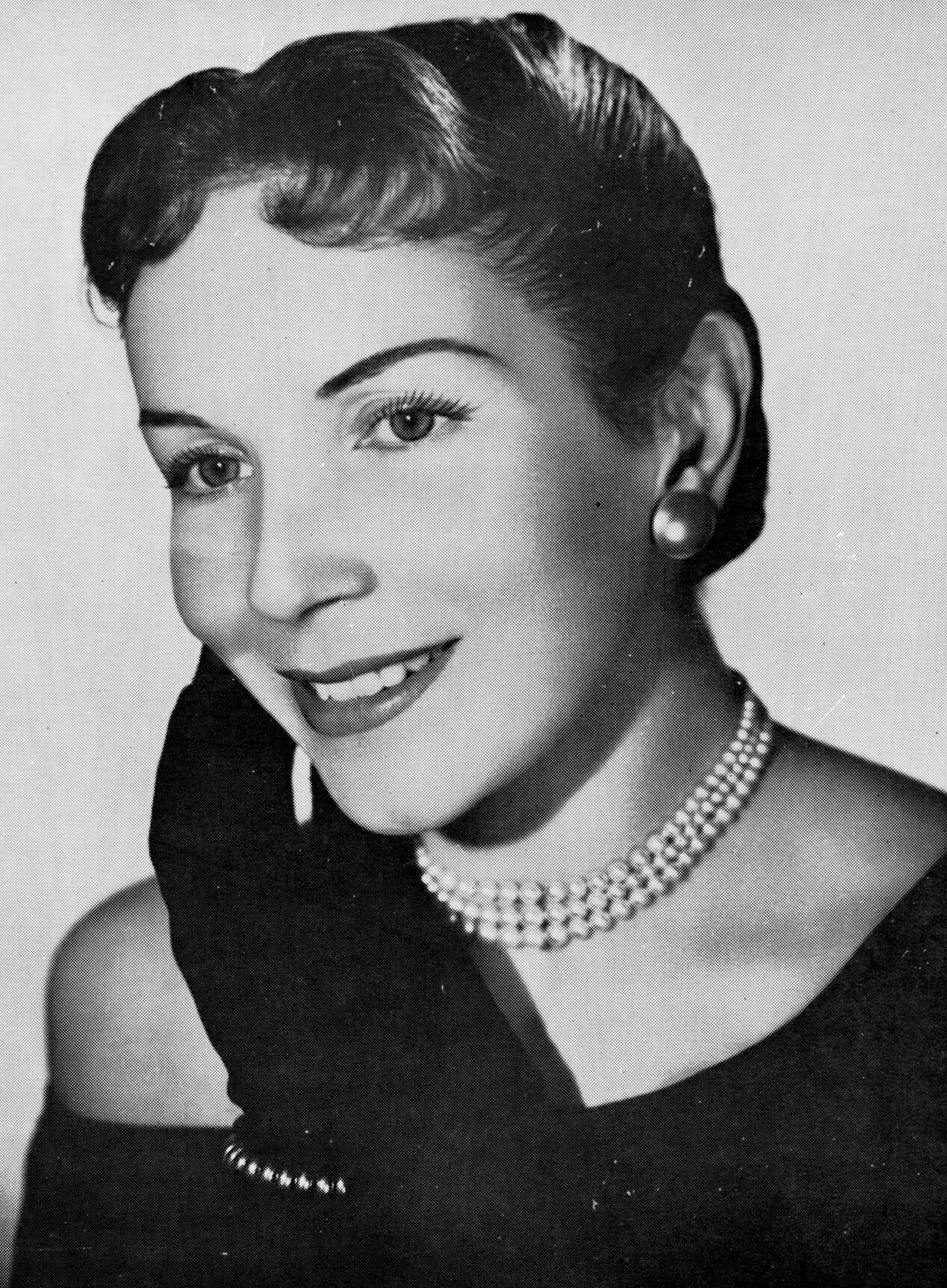
- Oliva in 1954

Personal information
- Nickname: Nadia
- Nationality: Mexican
- Born: Albertina Charlotte Boudesoque Noblecourt; 11 April 1918 Montcornet, Aisne, France
- Died: 17 January 2014 (aged 95) Mexico City, Mexico
- Spouse: Antonio Haro Oliva (his death)

Sport
- Sport: Fencing

Nadia Boudesoque de Haro Oliva (11 April 1918 – 17 January 2014), born Albertina Charlotte Boudesoque Noblecourt, was a French-Mexican fencer and actress. She competed in the women's individual foil event at the 1948 Summer Olympics.

== Select filmography ==
- The Exterminating Angel (1962)
- Love in the Shadows (1960)
- Mysteries of Black Magic (1958)
- Where the Circle Ends (1956)
