= Edward Nassour =

American film producer

Edward Nassour (April 7, 1911 – December 15, 1962) was an American film producer, businessman, and special effects animator. He was the brother and business partner of William Nassour (1903–1987).

== Biography ==
Edward Nassour was born in Colorado Springs, Colorado, one of the sons of Syrian immigrants Abraham and Rhoda Nassour, who had emigrated to New York's Little Syria with their elder son William in 1902. Before becoming a producer, Nassour worked as a Los Angeles businessman working in the aircraft manufacturing industry and had an interest in stop motion animation. In the early 1940s he partnered with Walter Lantz to make a stop motion Technicolor dinosaur film for Columbia Pictures entitled Lost Atlantis. Lantz and Nassour produced a test reel, but the project was too expensive and was never completed. The two men decided to form a company to make a series of stop motion films but the plan never was completed.

In 1946, the Nassour brothers purchased a four-acre lot on Sunset Boulevard and built a studio complex (Consolidated Studios) featuring four stages, a projection room, dressing rooms, and offices. A variety of independent films (such as Africa Screams and Mrs. Mike (both 1949)) and television shows were produced at the complex. After selling their studio complex to the Times Mirror Company for their TV station KTTV in May 1950, Nassour supervised the dinosaur sequences in The Lost Continent. They later built another studio, Nassour Studio Inc. Later the Nassours made the television series Sheena, Queen of the Jungle in Mexico.

Nassour developed a special effects process called "Regiscope" and successfully patented many animation techniques. He claimed to have spent 18 years developing the process from his Lost Atlantis project. Regiscope was used in the Mexican international co-production The Beast of Hollow Mountain that Edward directed based on designs by Willis O'Brien for his then-unfinished film The Valley of Gwangi.

== Personal life ==
In 1946, he married American film and radio actress Sharon Douglas (born Rhoda-Nelle Rader; October 16, 1920, Stephens County, Oklahoma – June 18, 2016); the couple had four sons together.

== Death ==
Nassour had been in poor health and was found dead in Sherman Oaks, California with a self-inflicted knife wound to the heart.
