= Monster Madhouse Live =

- Genre: Comedy, cult
- Created by: Jerry Moore
- Starring: Jerry Moore
- Theme music composer: Jerry Moore
- Opening theme: "Monster Madhouse March" by Jerry Moore
- Country of origin: United States
- Original language: English

Monster Madhouse is an American public-access television cable TV and Internet horror movie program. The show is hosted by horror host Karlos Borloff, played by Washington DC native Jerry Moore.

== History ==
Monster Madhouse debuted in 2006 as a featured group of monster hunters or Monsterminators led by Borloff (Moore).

For the first three years, Monster Madhouse was produced live from FCCTV studios in Falls Church, Virginia. The live show was also simulcast live on the Internet, making Monster Madhouse Live the first horror hosted movie program that was broadcast both live on television and the Internet as a simulcast event. The program shows are public domain films, "B" monster movies, and old black and white horror films from the 1960s and 1970s. New two-hour episodes of Monster Madhouse are produced about every three weeks and syndicated out to a series of stations across the country, then is edited to a half-hour 'magazine' shows and posted on Internet video sites such as Veoh and YouTube.

== Guests ==
Filmmaker Lloyd Kaufman (2008) and professional wrestler Nikolai Volkoff (2010) have both appeared on the Monster Madhouse set, as well as guest appearances by other television horror hosts such as Count Gore de Vol, Dr. Sarcofiguy from Spooky Movie Television, Jebediah Buzzard from "Fright Time Funhouse," Cinema Insomnia's Mr. Lobo and The Bone Jangler from Chicago. Buddha Gonzalez of "Bizarre Transmissions from the Bermuda Triangle", Bands, local personalities, and the general public are also encouraged to join the show, via an open door policy, and Borloff has interviewed and performed with many celebretities at Conventions and Film Festivals, like Tom Savini, Sid Haig and Herschell Gordon Lewis.

=== Current characters ===
- Karlos Borloff
- Beuregard J. Pettigrew
- Son of Borloff (S.O.B.)
- Freaky Daddy
- Buddha Gonzalez
