= Carmen Hermosillo =

American poet

- Died: August 10, 2008

Carmen Hermosillo (died August 10, 2008), also known as humdog, wolftone, Montserrat Snakeankle, Sparrowhawk Perhaps, was a community manager/research analyst, essayist, and poet. A contributor to 2GQ (now New Oregon Arts & Letters), FringeWare Review, wired, and Leonardo, Peter Ludlow's High Noon on the Electronic Frontier, and How to Mutate and Take Over the World, she was a participant in many online communities including early chat rooms and internet forums such as The WELL, BBSs, and later activities such as Second Life.

In 1994 she published a widely influential essay online, "Pandora's Vox: On Community in Cyberspace", in which she argued that the result of computer networks had led to, not a reduction in hierarchy, but actually a commodification of personality and a complex transfer of power and information to companies.

== Selected work ==
- "Pandora's Vox: On Community in Cyberspace" (1994)
- "Veni Redemptor: The Metallic Masks of God" (1997)
- "The History of the Board Ho" (2004)
- "A rant: Sex in Gaming" (2005)
- "Confessions of a Gorean Slave" (2006)
- "Roleplay and the Social Contract in Virtual Worlds" (unfinished)
