= Enrique Rambal =

Spanish actor (1924–1971)

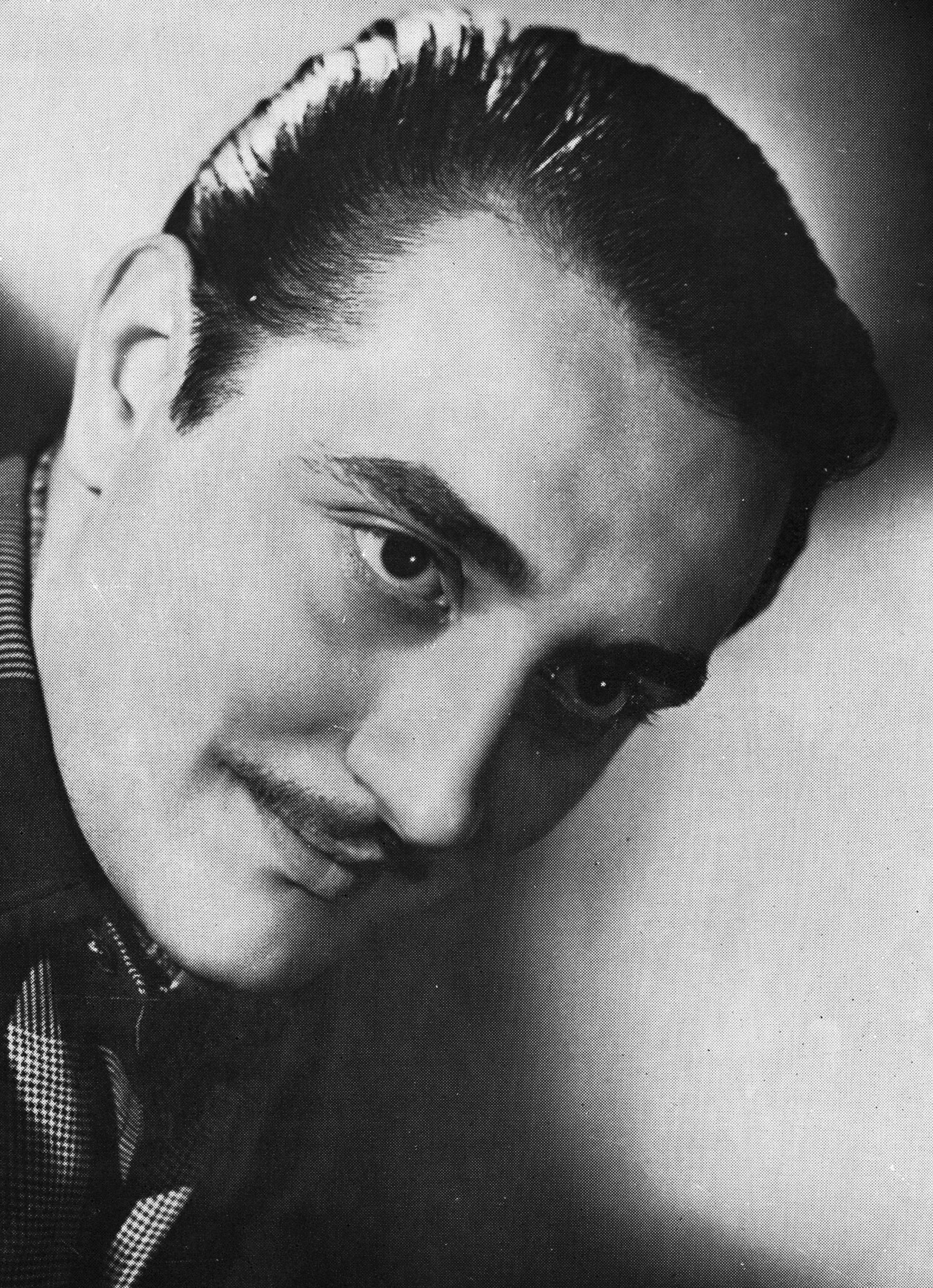
- Rambal in 1954
- Born: 8 May 1924; Madrid, Spain
- Died: 15 December 1971 (aged 47); Mexico City, Mexico

Enrique Rambal (8 May 1924 – 15 December 1971) was a Spanish-Mexican actor. He appeared in more than 60 films between 1952 and 1971. Enrique had married actresses Mercedes Borque and Lucy Gallardo.

== Selected filmography ==
- The Martyr of Calvary (1952)
- Tehuantepec (1954)
- Spring in the Heart (1956)
- El hombre y el monstruo (1958)
- Love in the Shadows (1960)
- Adventures of Joselito and Tom Thumb (1960)
- Young People (1961)
- La mujer dorada
- The Exterminating Angel (1962)
- La casa de las muchachas (1969)
