= Count Gore de Vol =

Television horror host

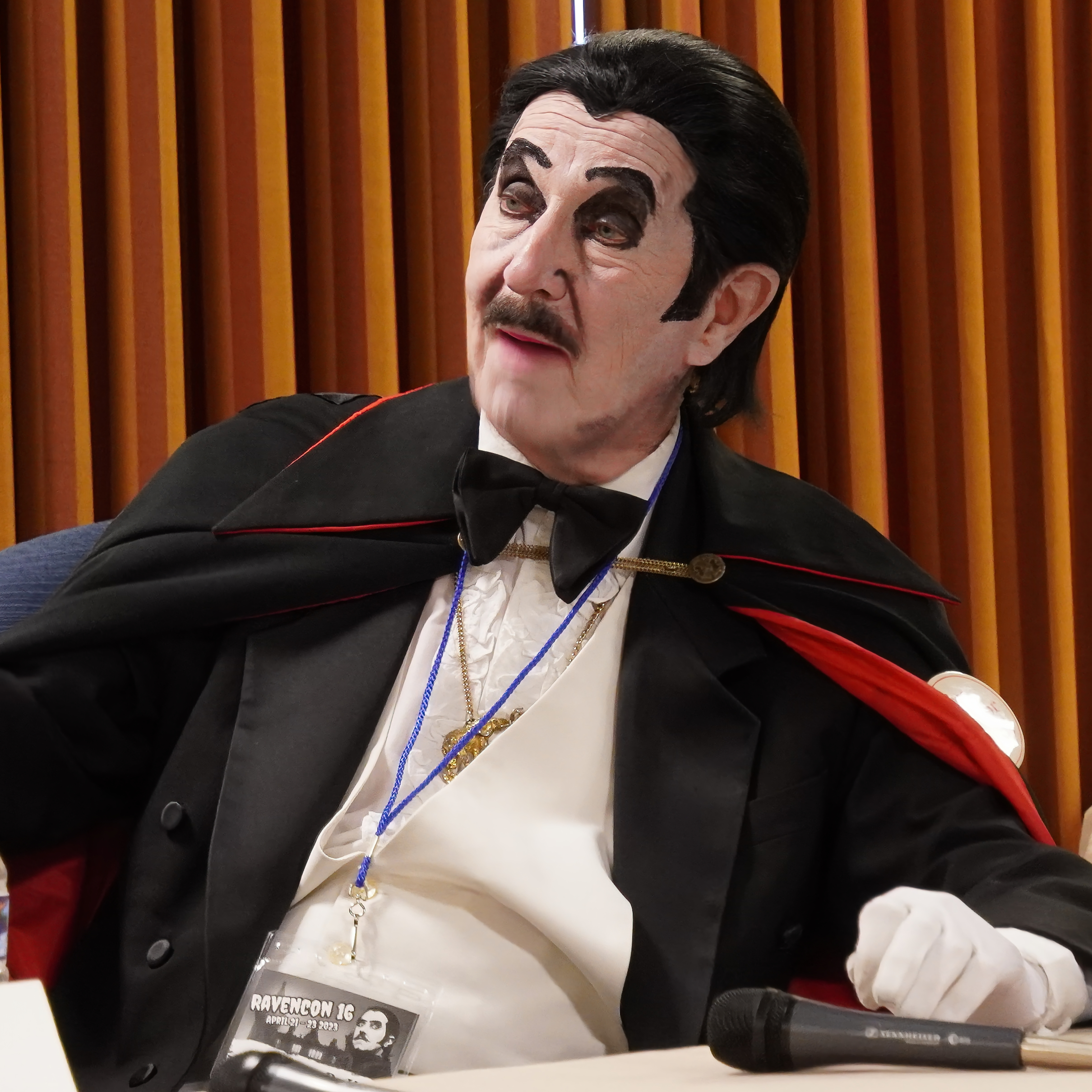
- Dick Dyszel as Count Gore De Vol in 2023
- Other name: Dick Dyszel
- Occupations: Television personality, interviewer
- Website: www.countgore.com

Count Gore De Vol is a television horror host who originally appeared on Washington, D.C.'s WDCA from 1973 to 1987. Originally named M.T. Graves when working at WDXR-TV in Paducah, Kentucky and played by announcer Dick Dyszel, the character first appeared on the WDCA version of the Bozo the Clown program. When the character got a positive reaction, he was given his own program, called Creature Feature. The choice of Gore De Vol as the character's name was either a pun involving the name of acerbic author Gore Vidal or the name of a prominent Washington, D.C. funeral home, "De Vol". Gore de Vol became the Washington/Baltimore area's longest-running horror host, broadcast every Saturday night on WDCA from March 1973 to May 1987.

On July 11, 1998 Count Gore De Vol became the first Horror Host with a show on the Internet with Creature Feature the Weekly Web Program at www.countgore.com. Starting as a texted based program because of the slow Internet speed, it quickly evolved into a full streaming service with hosted public domain horror films and scary good independent horror shorts. The program is updated every Saturday night rotating between either a new feature film or horror short, each playing for 2 weeks. In 2018 "Count Gore De Vol Presents" became a dedicated Roku Channel. This curated channel changes on the first of every month with 4 new Horror Features, 4 hosted Horror Shorts and 2 Celebrity Interviews. Since 2013, Count Gore De Vol has been live hosting personally selected horror films 3 times a year at the American Film Institute "Silver Theatre" located in Silver Spring, Maryland. He has also been a celebrity guest at numerous horror conventions and events.

In 2011, Count Gore De Vol became a member of the Horror Host Hall of Fame. The following year he has the privilege of inducting into Elvira into the same organization. The Count has done and continues to do numerous podcasts and has appeared in horror specials on Sirius XM and Shudder.

Dick Dyszel's career as Count Gore De Vol, Bozo the Clown and WDCA's Captain 20 was the subject of a feature length documentary film called "Every Other Day Is Halloween." The film, directed by C.W. Prather, premiered at San Diego Comic-Con in 2009 and then was released on DVD. In 2025, the film was released on Blu-ray with the addition of "50 Years and Counting" an updated documentary covering Dyszel's continuing career as Count Gore De Vol.

== See also ==
- Horror host
- John Dimes
- Steve Niles
