= Thornfield Hall =

Fictional house in 1847 novel Jane Eyre

Thornfield Hall is a location in the 1847 novel Jane Eyre by Charlotte Brontë. It is the home of the male romantic lead, Edward Fairfax Rochester, where much of the action takes place.

Brontë uses the depiction of Thornfield in a manner consistent with the gothic tone of the novel as a whole. An isolated mansion of unspecified size, the house has a number of apparently unused rooms that become important to the narrative during the Bertha Mason passages. The Hall's gloomy character also expresses and amplifies the sense of Mr. Rochester's depression and malaise before he falls in love with Jane.

In contrast, the grounds surrounding Thornfield are sublime and healthful to the novel's many troubled characters and serve as a backdrop to many happier scenes.

== Inspiration ==
A theory holds that North Lees Hall in Hathersage was the inspiration for Thornfield, particularly given that "Morton" in the novel is believed to be based on Hathersage, and that Brontë stayed in the area before writing the novel.

Another theory is that High Sunderland Hall in Halifax was the basis for Thornfield. The house had all the Gothic features of Thornfield and is a location that was familiar to the Brontë family.

== Depiction ==
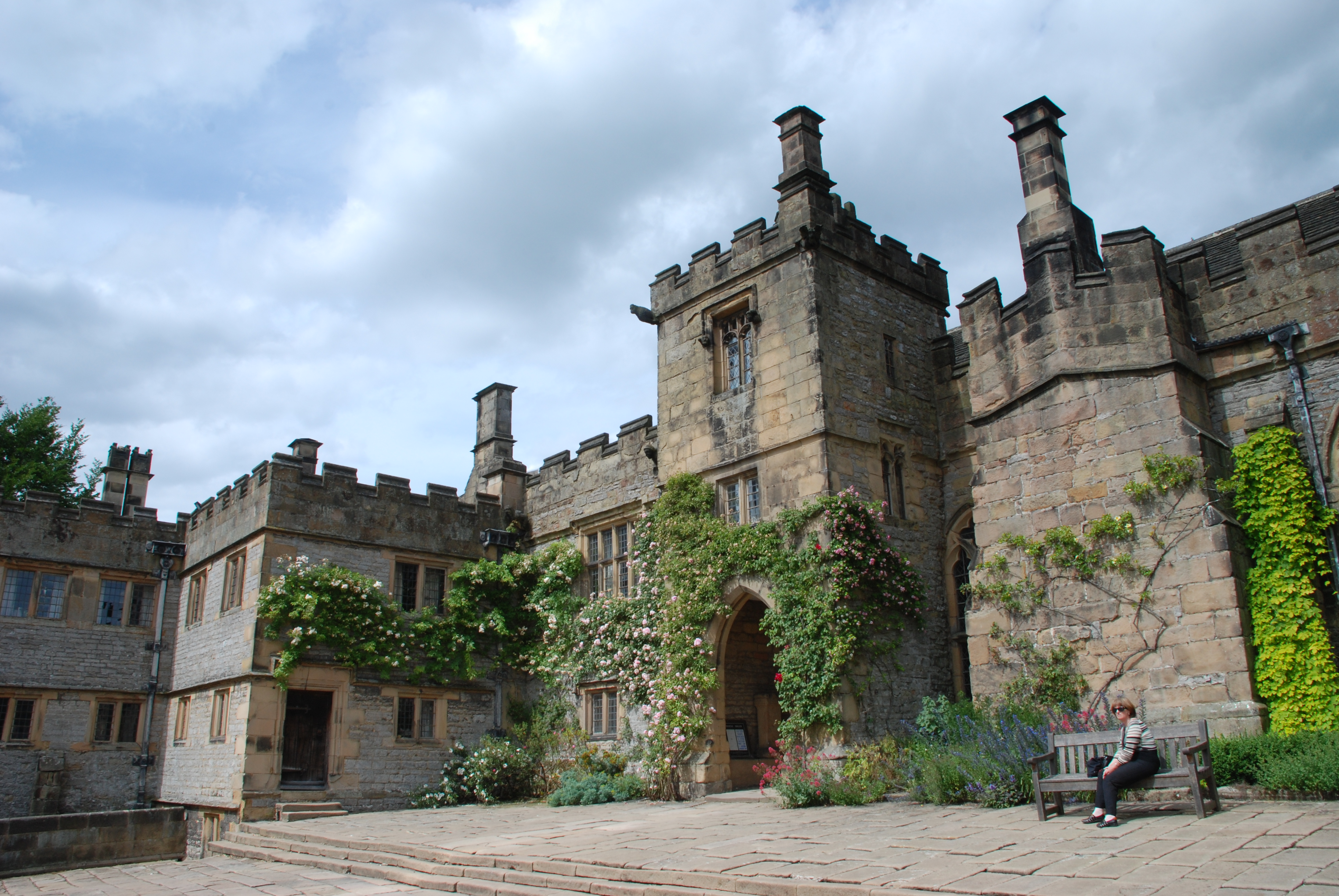
Haddon Hall has been used to depict Thornfield on multiple occasions.

Haddon Hall, near Bakewell, Derbyshire, has been used to depict Thornfield on several occasions: for the 1996 film directed by Franco Zeffirelli (starring William Hurt and Charlotte Gainsbourg); in the BBC 2006 mini series directed by Susanna White (Toby Stephens and Ruth Wilson), and for the 2011 film (Mia Wasikowska and Michael Fassbender) directed by Cary Fukunaga. In 1996 and 2011 Wingfield Manor, in Derbyshire, was used to depict Thornfield after the fire, and in 2011 Chatsworth House was used for the gardens.

Other locations include Ripley Castle, Yorks, in 1970; Renishaw Hall, Derby, in 1973; and Deene Park, Northampton, in 1983. The 1997 film used Naworth Castle, Cumbria, for the exteriors and Knebworth House, Herts, for the interiors.

Loseley Park, in Surrey, depicted Thornfield Hall in the 2006 film adaptation of Wide Sargasso Sea, the Jane Eyre prequel by Jean Rhys.
