= Wuthering Heights =

1847 novel by Emily Brontë

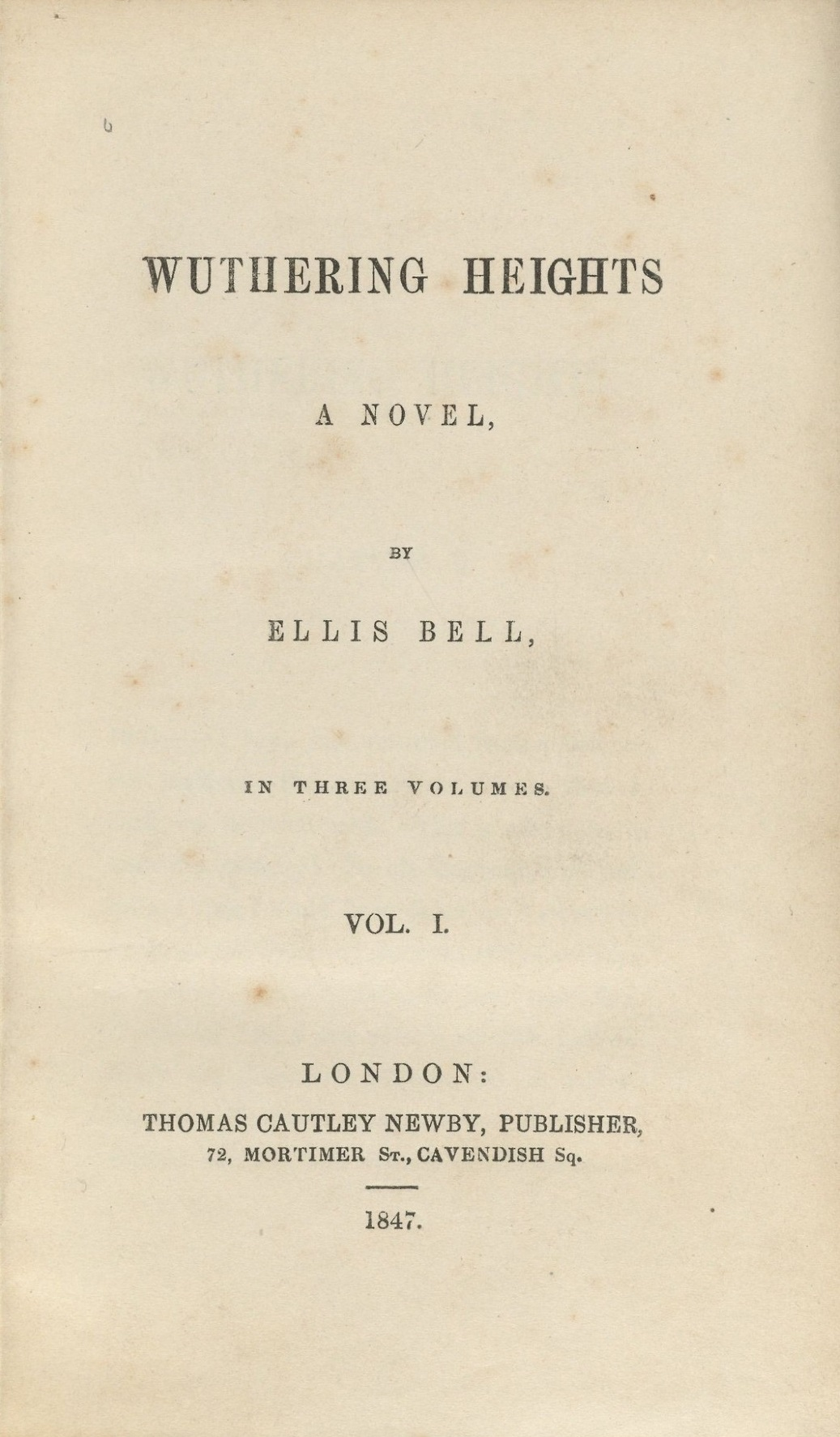
- Title page of the first edition, 1847
- Author: Emily Brontë
- Language: English
- Genre: Tragedy, Gothic
- Set in: Northern England
- Published: 24 November 1847
- Publisher: Thomas Cautley Newby
- Publication place: United Kingdom
- ISBN: 0-486-29256-8
- OCLC: 71126926
- Dewey Decimal: 823.8
- LC Class: PR4172 .W7 2007
- Text: Wuthering Heights at Wikisource

Wuthering Heights is the only novel by the English author Emily Brontë, initially published in 1847 under her pen name Ellis Bell. It concerns two landowning families on the West Yorkshire moors, the Earnshaws and the Lintons, and their turbulent relationships with the Earnshaws' foster son, Heathcliff. Driven by themes of love, possession, revenge, and reconciliation, the novel is influenced by Romanticism and Gothic fiction. It is considered a classic of English literature.

Wuthering Heights was accepted by publisher Thomas Newby along with Anne Brontë's Agnes Grey before the success of their sister Charlotte Brontë's novel Jane Eyre, but Jane Eyre was published before the other two. The first American edition was published in April 1848 by Harper & Brothers of New York. After Emily's death, Charlotte edited a second edition of Wuthering Heights, which was published in 1850.

Though contemporary reviews were polarised, Wuthering Heights has come to be considered one of the greatest novels written in English. It was controversial for its depictions of mental and physical cruelty, including domestic abuse, and for its challenges to Victorian morality, religion, and the class system. It has inspired an array of adaptations across several types of media.

== Story ==
=== Opening ===
In 1801, Mr Lockwood, the new tenant at Thrushcross Grange in Yorkshire, visits his landlord, Heathcliff, at his remote moorland estate, Wuthering Heights. There he meets a reserved young woman (later identified as Cathy Linton), Joseph, a sanctimonious, ill-tempered servant, and Hareton, an uneducated young man who appears to be a servant. Everyone is sullen and inhospitable. Snowed in for the night, Lockwood reads diary entries of the former inhabitant of his room, Catherine Earnshaw, and has a nightmare in which a ghostly Catherine begs to enter through the window. Awakened by Lockwood's yells, Heathcliff is distraught at hearing of this dream, and begs Catherine to appear to him.

Lockwood returns to Thrushcross Grange and falls ill. While he recovers, Lockwood's housekeeper, Ellen "Nelly" Dean, tells a strange story about the Earnshaw family, whom she once served.

=== Nelly's tale ===
Thirty years earlier, the Earnshaws live at Wuthering Heights with their two children, Hindley (aged fourteen) and Catherine (aged six), and their servant, Nelly. Returning from a trip to Liverpool, Earnshaw brings home an orphan whom he names Heathcliff. Heathcliff's origins are unclear but he is described as "like a gipsy" and, possibly, a Lascar or an American or Spanish castaway. Earnshaw treats the boy as his favourite and neglects his own children, especially after his wife dies. Hindley beats Heathcliff, who gradually becomes close friends with Catherine.

Hindley departs for university and returns three years later as the new master of Wuthering Heights after his father's death. He and his new wife, Frances, force Heathcliff to live as a servant.

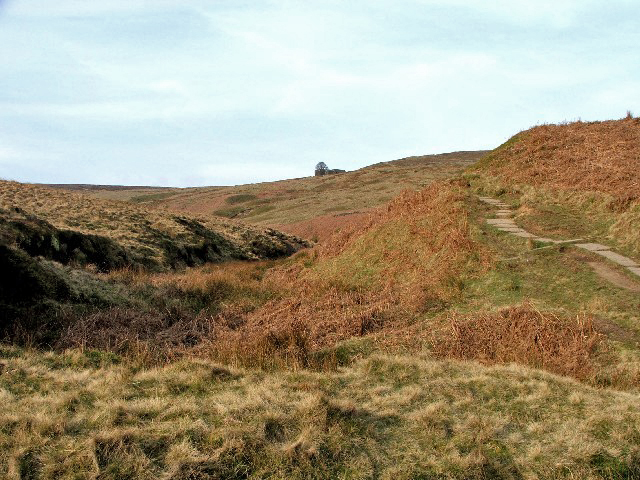
The climb to ruined farmhouse Top Withens, thought to have inspired the Earnshaws' home in Wuthering Heights

Edgar Linton and his sister Isabella live nearby at Thrushcross Grange, and Heathcliff and Catherine spy on them after one of their rambles across the moors. When Catherine is attacked by their dog, the Lintons take her in but send Heathcliff home. When the Lintons visit, Hindley and Edgar make fun of Heathcliff, and a fight ensues. Heathcliff, banished to an attic, swears that he will one day have his revenge.

Frances dies after giving birth to a son, Hareton. Two years later, Catherine accepts Edgar's marriage proposal. She confesses to Nelly that she loves Heathcliff deeply but cannot marry him because of his low social status. Nelly warns against associating with Heathcliff. Heathcliff overhears part of the conversation and, misunderstanding Catherine's feelings, flees the household. Distraught, Catherine falls ill.

Three years after his departure, with Edgar and Catherine now married, Heathcliff returns unexpectedly, now mysteriously wealthy. He plays upon Isabella's infatuation as revenge on Edgar. Enraged by Heathcliff's presence at the Grange, Edgar banishes him. Distraught, Catherine locks herself in her room and refuses food for three days. At Wuthering Heights, Heathcliff exploits Hindley's gambling addiction and becomes mortgagee of the estate. Heathcliff tricks Isabella into eloping, but they soon return.

Heathcliff visits the gravely ill and pregnant Catherine in secret. She dies shortly after giving birth to a daughter, Cathy. Heathcliff rages, calling on Catherine's ghost to haunt him. Isabella, embittered by Heathcliff's obsession and having suffered mental and physical abuse, flees south where she gives birth to Heathcliff's son, a sickly boy named Linton. Hindley dies six months later of alcoholism, and Hareton inherits Wuthering Heights, although Heathcliff takes possession.

Twelve years later, after Isabella's death, the still-sickly Linton, prospective inheritor to Thrushcross Grange, is brought back to live there, but Heathcliff insists that his son must live with him. Cathy and Linton become friends. Heathcliff schemes to have them marry, hoping to control Cathy's inheritance. On Edgar's death the young couple go to live at Wuthering Heights. Heathcliff becomes increasingly wild, revealing that he has opened Catherine's grave on two occasions. When Linton dies, Cathy, his widow, has no option but to remain at Wuthering Heights, where Heathcliff mistreats her.

Having reached the present day, Nelly's tale concludes.

=== Ending ===
Lockwood moves away, returning eight months later to pay his rent. Nelly, now the housekeeper at Wuthering Heights, updates him.

Cathy seeks Hareton's forgiveness – their reconciliation leading to love – and subsequently confronts Heathcliff with unlawfully taking both their properties. Declining physically, and increasingly fixated by the dead Catherine, Heathcliff avoids the young couple. He eventually stops eating, and some days later is found dead in Catherine's old room.

Hareton has reclaimed Wuthering Heights, and Cathy has been teaching him to read. They plan to marry and move to the Grange, of which she is now the undisputed owner, with Joseph having left to take care of Wuthering Heights. Locals report having seen the ghosts of Catherine and Heathcliff together on the moors. Lockwood seeks out the graves of Catherine, Edgar, and Heathcliff, side-by-side, and is convinced that all three are finally at peace.

=== Family tree ===
Mrs Earnshaw
Frances	Hindley; Earnshaw
Hareton; Earnshaw m. 1803

Mr Earnshaw	Mrs Linton
Catherine; Earnshaw	Edgar; Linton
Cathy; Linton

Mr Linton
Isabella; Linton	Heathcliff
Linton; Heathcliff m. 1801

== Characters ==
Heathcliff
A dark-featured, ethnically ambiguous foundling from Liverpool, who is taken by Earnshaw to Wuthering Heights, where he is reluctantly cared for by the family and spoiled by his adoptive father. He and Mr Earnshaw's daughter, Catherine, grow close, and their love and mutual possession is the central theme of the first volume. On discovering Catherine's engagement to marry Edgar, Heathcliff leaves, only to return three years later, having acquired both wealth and legal expertise, which he then applies with ruthlessness and great cruelty. His revenge against Edgar and Hindley, and its consequences, are the central theme of the second volume. Once both his enemies are dead, Heathcliff resolves to carry on his campaign of vengeance against their offspring, Cathy (whom he reviles), and Hareton (of whom he is personally fond). He is 20 when he marries Edgar's sister Isabella, and 38 when he dies intestate. Since he has then no next of kin, Heathcliff's estate will escheat to the crown; although, as Thrushcross Grange and Wuthering Heights must revert to their true owners, and as his inheritance of Edgar's personal property through first Edgar's will and then that of his son Linton, could not by then both have completed probate, the bulk of the wealth he has amassed in Gimmerton is unlikely to be escheated. Heathcliff has been considered as a Byronic hero, but critics have pointed out that he reinvents himself at various points, making his character hard to fit into any single type. He has an ambiguous position in society, and his lack of status is underlined by the fact that "Heathcliff" is both his given name and his surname. It has been suggested that the character of Heathcliff may have been inspired by Branwell Brontë. An alcoholic and an opium addict, he was subject to frequent crises of delirium tremens and volatile behaviour in the years before his death.
Catherine Earnshaw
Addressed as Cathy by Heathcliff, and as Catherine by Edgar, she is first introduced to the reader after her death, through Lockwood's discovery of her diary and her own carvings. As a child she is, like Heathcliff, wild and untameable; as she grows into adulthood, her behaviour may appear sociable and conventional, but wildness, self-centredness, and even cruelty are never deeply buried. She is 17 when she marries Edgar. The description of her life is confined almost entirely to the first volume, but her increasingly powerful possession of Heathcliff (both from beyond the grave and physically in it) becomes the driving force of the second volume. She seems unsure whether she is, or wants to become, more like Heathcliff or more like Edgar. Some critics argued that her decision to marry Edgar Linton is allegorically a rejection of nature and a surrender to culture, a choice with unfortunate, fateful consequences for all the other characters. She dies hours after giving birth to her daughter.
Edgar Linton
Introduced as a child in the Linton family, he resides at Thrushcross Grange and is, like his father, a leading figure in the local landed gentry and a magistrate. Edgar's style and manners are in sharp contrast to those of Heathcliff, who instantly dislikes him, and of Catherine, who is drawn to him. He is 21 when he weds Catherine, who marries him instead of Heathcliff because of his higher social status, with disastrous consequences for all the characters in the story. He dotes on his wife and later his daughter; but, as the Thrushcross Grange estate had been entailed in the male line by a strict settlement in his father's will, he proves unable to prevent his landed property from being inherited by Linton Heathcliff, and falling into the possession of Heathcliff; while his attempt to protect his personal property and Cathy's substantial marriage portion from Heathcliff by placing it in trust, fails when he is betrayed by his attorney, Mr Green. Consequently, Cathy, now married to Linton Heathcliff, remains at Edgar's death as the residual beneficiary of his personal property, and is implied to be the sole executor of his will.
Ellen (Nelly) Dean
Referred to as Nelly among those close to her. The main narrator of the novel, Nelly is a servant to three generations of the Earnshaws and two of the Linton family. Humbly born, she regards herself nevertheless as Hindley's foster-sister (they are the same age, and her mother is his nurse). She lives and works among the rough inhabitants of Wuthering Heights but is well-read, and she also experiences the more genteel manners of Thrushcross Grange. Both Catherine and Heathcliff confide in her, as does Isabella, but not Edgar. She arranges the burial of Hindley and then of Edgar alongside Catherine in accordance with his will. Heathcliff subsequently seeks Nelly's assurance that she will do the same service for him after his death. Critics have discussed how far her actions as an apparent bystander affect the other characters and how much her narrative can be relied on. In "The Villain in Wuthering Heights" (1958), James Hafley argues that Nelly seems to be the moral centre of the novel only because of the instability and violence of the world she describes. In his view, she is the true villain of the novel, as she drives the majority of the conflicts by selectively revealing or concealing what others are doing; and, at the end, is apparently in control of both houses.
Isabella Linton
Edgar's younger sister. Once Heathcliff returns, she views him romantically, despite Catherine's warnings, and becomes an unwitting participant in his plot for revenge against Edgar and Catherine. When Isabella is aged 19, Heathcliff manipulates her into eloping with him and reveals his cruel nature to her immediately after they are wed. Heathcliff verbally and physically abuses Isabella, keeps her imprisoned in the house, and is strongly implied to rape her. While pregnant and fearing for the safety of her unborn child, Isabella manages to escape to London and gives birth to their son, Linton. Isabella raises Linton as a single mother until he is 12 and then entrusts him to her brother Edgar before she dies. Heathcliff's dubious claim to continued lifetime possession of the Thrushcross Grange estate after Linton Heathcliff dies is based on the common law right of 'curtesy' from his marriage to Isabella.
Hindley Earnshaw
Catherine's elder brother. Hindley despises Heathcliff immediately and bullies him throughout their childhood before his father sends him away to university. Aged 20, Hindley returns with his wife Frances, after Mr Earnshaw dies. He is more mature, but his hatred of Heathcliff remains the same. After Frances's death, Hindley reverts to destructive behaviour, neglects his son, and ruins the Earnshaw estate by drinking and gambling to excess. He allows the returning Heathcliff to re-establish himself at Wuthering Heights; initially because he pays a generous rent, subsequently in the hope of winning back the money he has lost. Heathcliff beats Hindley after Hindley fails in his attempt to kill him with a pistol. He dies less than a year after Catherine and leaves his son as the owner of an estate encumbered with mortgage debt.
Hareton Earnshaw
The son of Hindley and Frances, raised initially by Nelly and then by Heathcliff, and the heir of the ancient upland farming estate of Wuthering Heights. Hareton speaks with an accent similar to Joseph's and occupies a position akin to that of a servant, unaware that he is being barred from his inheritance, although this is otherwise common knowledge in this part of West Yorkshire. He can read only his name. Joseph works to instill a sense of pride, even though Hareton cannot come into control of Wuthering Heights while it remains mortgaged to Heathcliff. Heathcliff, meanwhile, teaches him vulgarities as a way of avenging himself on Hindley. In appearance, Hareton resembles his aunt, Catherine. From first meeting Cathy – when she is aged 13 – Hareton is captivated by her, and is mortified when she mocks his uncouth speech and lack of education. When she later apologises and seeks reconciliation, he responds with love; however, because he regards Heathcliff as a father figure, he remains torn between Heathcliff and Cathy. When Cathy confronts Heathcliff directly with having unlawfully taken both her property and his, Hareton is compelled to defend her against Heathcliff's rage and brutality. He is 23 when he marries the widowed Cathy.
Catherine "Cathy" Linton
Addressed as Catherine by Heathcliff, and as Cathy by Edgar. The daughter of Catherine and Edgar Linton, she is like her father in looks and like her mother in being a spirited, strong-willed girl, though lacking her mother's self-absorption and disregard for those around her. She is unaware of her parents' history. Edgar is very protective of her and, as a result, she is eager to discover what lies beyond the confines of the Grange. She is Edgar's sole heir. She initially treats her cousin Hareton and his lack of education with cruel contempt, while being drawn to the sickly Linton Heathcliff. When abducted by Heathcliff, she agrees to marry Linton. The two of them had shared only a few days and nights as man and wife when, in defiance of his father, Linton helps her escape to her father's deathbed. Returning, Cathy finds Linton himself desperately ill and dying. As a widow, she develops a rapid awareness of both Heathcliff's machinations and of her own resources of determination and defiance. She eventually seeks Hareton's forgiveness and returns his love. Cathy and Hareton are the legal owners of Thrushcross Grange and Wuthering Heights, respectively, but neither alone can challenge Heathcliff's possession of these properties at law – Cathy as a minor, and Hareton as being without education. Having confronted Heathcliff and overmastered his brutal response, the couple plan to marry. While still a minor, Cathy will not be able to act legally as the sole executor of Edgar's or Linton's will, but as Linton's widow and Edgar's daughter the ecclesiastical courts will recognise her as executrix with the power to choose Hareton as her co-executor for both wills. She is 17 when she marries Linton, and 19 when she marries Hareton.
Linton Heathcliff
The son of Heathcliff and Isabella. Linton is recognised from birth as the prospective heir to Thrushcross Grange through his grandfather's will. A weak child, he spent his early years with his mother in the south of England. He learns of his father's identity and existence only after his mother dies when he is twelve. Physically, he resembles his mother, but in selfishness and capacity for cruelty he initially resembles Heathcliff. But he also retains an openness to love, and Cathy appears to be the only person who recognises and responds to it. He marries Cathy Linton at age 16 primarily because his father, who terrifies him, directs him to do so. He is then torn between the overwhelming demands of his father's domineering brutality and those of his new wife's love, compassion and expectation of mutual support and affection; a contest in which Cathy emerges as the winner, when Linton overcomes his terror of Heathcliff and assists her in escaping to her dying father. Heathcliff's response to this defiance is cruel, and though Linton's wasting condition rapidly worsens, he refuses to call the doctor. In his final illness, Linton is pressured into making a will bequeathing all his personal property (which should eventually include all the personal property that Cathy has inherited at Edgar's death) to his father. But his ownership of the Thrushcross Grange estate cannot pass to Heathcliff, as a minor could not devise land by will. Heathcliff then abandons Linton entirely as being of no further use for his purposes; only Cathy remains with him in his final days.
Joseph
A servant at Wuthering Heights for 60 years who is a rigid, self-righteous Christian but lacks any trace of genuine kindness or humanity. He hates nearly everyone in the novel except Hareton and rejoices at Heathcliff's death, in the confidence of Hareton's reclaiming his lands. The Yorkshire dialect that Joseph speaks was the subject of a 1970 book by the linguist K.M. Petyt, who argued that Emily Brontë recorded the dialect of Haworth accurately.
Mr Lockwood
The first narrator, he rents Thrushcross Grange to escape society, but in the end, decides society is preferable. On encountering Wuthering Heights and its unsociable residents, he ostensibly reacts with manners of studied gallantry and gentility; which are almost immediately belied in his subsequent dream encounter with the wailing witch child "Catherine Linton", where his "unexpectedly violent attack upon her indicates the terrified perception of the dangers she represents". In the meantime, he entertains daydreams of courting Cathy Heathcliff, without taking them any further. Lockwood narrates the book until Chapter 4, when the main narrator, Nelly, picks up the tale.
Frances
Hindley's ailing wife and mother of Hareton Earnshaw. She is described as somewhat silly and is obviously from a humble family. Frances dies not long after the birth of her son.
Mr and Mrs Earnshaw
Catherine's and Hindley's father, Mr Earnshaw, is the master of Wuthering Heights at the beginning of Nelly's story and is described as an irascible but loving and kind-hearted man. The Earnshaws are an ancient farming family with an extensive upland estate, who have held Wuthering Heights since before 1500 (the date on the lintel over the door), but are not gentry. With business in Liverpool, 60 miles distant, Mr Earnshaw walks rather than take a horse away from the harvest. The estate has several tenants, and the farm is sufficiently prosperous for them to afford to send their son, Hindley, to university. Mr Earnshaw favours his adopted son, Heathcliff, causing trouble in the family. In contrast, his wife mistrusts Heathcliff from their first encounter.
Mr and Mrs Linton
Edgar's and Isabella's parents, and prominent members of the Yorkshire landed gentry. Their modern Thrushcross Grange house is set within a walled and landscaped park; beyond which is an extensive estate with several tenanted farms. They bring up their children to be well-behaved and sophisticated. Mr Linton also serves as the magistrate of Gimmerton, as his son does in later years; and, as was common for gentry families at the time, Mr Linton settles their Thrushcross Grange estate in entail by a strict settlement under the trusteeship of Mr Green, the family lawyer. Under the terms of Mr Linton's will, Edgar – as 'tenant in possession' has only a life interest in the Thrushcross estate, which must pass on his death to his, yet unborn, oldest son. In default of Edgar having no son but only a daughter (as indeed was the case), the line of inheritance under the will must pass instead through a second entail to Isabella and her oldest son. That son turns out to be Linton Heathcliff, but although Linton and Cathy marry, they have no offspring, so the line of entails in the will ceases on Linton's death. Thrushcross Grange must then revert to old Mr Linton, and so pass by intestate succession to his sole heir on the female line, Cathy Heathcliff (subsequently to be Cathy Earnshaw).
Mr Kenneth
An apothecary by profession (hence the title 'Mr'), he is always referred to as the 'doctor'. The longtime clinical practitioner of Gimmerton and a friend of Hindley's, he is present at most of the cases of illness and death during the novel, although Heathcliff refuses to allow him to examine or treat Linton in his final illness. Not much of his character is known, but he seems to be a rough but honest person.
Zillah
A servant to Heathcliff at Wuthering Heights during the period following Catherine's death. While Linton is living there, and through his final illness, she is the only resident of Wuthering Heights, other than Cathy, who helps or interacts with him. Although she is kind to Lockwood, she neither likes nor helps Cathy because of Cathy's high-handed behaviour and Heathcliff's instructions.
Mr Green
The family lawyer for both the Earnshaw and Linton families, and the trustee of the strict settlement established by Mr Linton's will; in which capacity he, quite properly, closes down the house after Edgar's death, but also improperly seeks to meddle in the responsibilities of Edgar's executor in respect of his burial. Heathcliff suborns him to serve his interests; by standing by while Heathcliff frustrates Hareton's ownership of Wuthering Heights in failing to allow its profits to repay his mortgages; by allowing Heathcliff to control Thrushcross Grange against Cathy, its legal heiress; and also by not attending the dying Edgar in his wish to alter his will to protect Cathy's inheritance of personal property. Nevertheless, his support for Heathcliff appears to be through strategic inaction rather than improper actions; once Heathcliff has died, he may be assumed to have been compliant, as Cathy and Hareton together asserted their legal rights. In the final chapters, he is no longer being employed by Cathy to manage her Thrushcross Grange estate.

== Publication history ==
=== 1847 edition ===
The original text as published by Thomas Cautley Newby in 1847 is available online in two parts. The novel was first published together with Anne Brontë's Agnes Grey in a three-volume format: Wuthering Heights filled the first two volumes and Agnes Grey made up the third. In the 1850 edition, the Wuthering Heights chapters were renumbered as a single volume: Volume I of the 1847 edition corresponds to chapters 1 to 14, while Volume II corresponds to chapters 15 to 34.

=== 1850 edition ===
In 1850 Charlotte Brontë edited the original text for the second edition of Wuthering Heights and also provided it with her foreword. She addressed the faulty punctuation and orthography but also diluted Joseph's thick Yorkshire dialect. Writing to her publisher, W. S. Williams, she said that

It seems to me advisable to modify the orthography of the old servant Joseph's speeches; for though, as it stands, it exactly renders the Yorkshire dialect to a Yorkshire ear, yet I am sure Southerns must find it unintelligible; and thus one of the most graphic characters in the book is lost on them.

Irene Wiltshire, in an essay on dialect and speech, examines some of the changes Charlotte made.

== Critical response ==
=== Contemporary reviews ===
Early reviews of Wuthering Heights were mixed. Most critics recognised the power and imagination of the novel, but were baffled by the storyline, and objected to the savagery and selfishness of the characters. In 1847, when the background of an author was given great importance in literary criticism, many critics were intrigued by the authorship of the Bell novels.

The Atlas review called it a "strange, inartistic story", but commented that every chapter seems to contain a "sort of rugged power."

Graham's Lady Magazine wrote:

How a human being could have attempted such a book as the present without committing suicide before he had finished a dozen chapters, is a mystery. It is a compound of vulgar depravity and unnatural horrors".

The American Whig Review wrote:

Respecting a book so original as this, and written with so much power of imagination, it is natural that there should be many opinions. Indeed, its power is so predominant that it is not easy after a hasty reading to analyze one's impressions so as to speak of its merits and demerits with confidence. We have been taken and carried through a new region, a melancholy waste, with here and there patches of beauty; have been brought in contact with fierce passions, with extremes of love and hate, and with sorrow that none but those who have suffered can understand."

Douglas Jerrold's Weekly Newspaper wrote:

Wuthering Heights is a strange sort of book,—baffling all regular criticism; yet, it is impossible to begin and not finish it; and quite as impossible to lay it aside afterwards and say nothing about. In Wuthering Heights the reader is shocked, disgusted, almost sickened by details of cruelty, inhumanity, and the most diabolical hate and vengeance, and anon come passages of powerful testimony to the supreme power of love – even over demons in the human form. The women in the book are of a strange fiendish-angelic nature, tantalising, and terrible, and the men are indescribable out of the book itself.

The Examiner wrote:

This is a strange book. It is not without evidences of considerable power: but, as a whole, it is wild, confused, disjointed, and improbable; and the people who make up the drama, which is tragic enough in its consequences, are savages ruder than those who lived before the days of Homer.

The Literary World wrote:

In the whole story not a single trait of character is elicited which can command our admiration, not one of the fine feelings of our nature seems to have formed a part in the composition of its principal actors. In spite of the disgusting coarsness of much of the dialogue, and the improbabilities of much of the plot, we are spellbound.

The English poet and painter Dante Gabriel Rossetti admired the book, writing in 1854 that it was "the first novel I've read for an age, and the best (as regards power and sound style) for two ages, except Sidonia", but, in the same letter, he also referred to it as "a fiend of a book – an incredible monster ... The action is laid in hell, – only it seems places and people have English names there".

Rossetti's friend, the poet Algernon Charles Swinburne was another early admirer of the novel, and in conclusion for an essay on Emily Brontë, published in The Athenaeum in 1883, writes: "As was the author's life, so is her book in all things: troubled and taintless, with little of rest in it, and nothing of reproach. It may be true that not many will ever take it to their hearts; it is certain that those who do like it will like nothing very much better in the whole world of poetry or prose."

=== Twentieth century ===
Until late in the 19th century, "Jane Eyre was regarded as the best of the Brontë sisters' novels". This view began to change in the 1880s with the publication of A. Mary F. Robinson's biography of Emily in 1883. Modernist novelist Virginia Woolf affirmed the greatness of Wuthering Heights in 1925:

Wuthering Heights is a more difficult book to understand than Jane Eyre, because Emily was a greater poet than Charlotte. ... She looked out upon a world cleft into gigantic disorder and felt within her the power to unite it in a book. That gigantic ambition is to be felt throughout the novel ... It is this suggestion of power underlying the apparitions of human nature and lifting them up into the presence of greatness that gives the book its huge stature among other novels.

Similarly, Woolf's contemporary John Cowper Powys referred in 1916 to Emily Brontë's "tremendous vision". In 1926 Charles Percy Sanger's work on the chronology of Wuthering Heights "affirmed Emily's literary craft and meticulous planning of the novel and disproved Charlotte's presentation of her sister as an unconscious artist who 'did not know what she had done'." However, for a later critic, Albert J. Guerard, "it is a splendid, imperfect novel which Brontë loses control over occasionally". Still, in 1934, Lord David Cecil, writing in Early Victorian Novelists, commented "that Emily Brontë was not properly appreciated; even her admirers saw her as an 'unequal genius'," and in 1948 F. R. Leavis excluded Wuthering Heights from the great tradition of the English novel because it was "a 'kind of sport'—an anomaly with 'some influence of an essentially undetectable kind.'" The novelist Daphne du Maurier argued the status of Wuthering Heights as a "supreme romantic novel" in 1971:

There is more savagery, more brutality, in the pages of Wuthering Heights than in any novel of the nineteenth century, and, for good measure, more beauty too, more poetry, and, what is more unusual, a complete lack of sexual emotion. ... Emily Brontë, striding over the Yorkshire moors with her dog, did not conjure from her imagination any cozy tale of happy lovers to console women readers sitting snugly within doors.

=== Twenty-first century ===
Writing in The Observer in 2003, writer and editor Robert McCrum placed Wuthering Heights in his list of 100 greatest novels of all time. In 2015, he placed it in his list of 100 best novels written in English. He said that

Wuthering Heights releases extraordinary new energies in the novel, renews its potential, and almost reinvents the genre. The scope and drift of its imagination, its passionate exploration of a fatal yet regenerative love affair, and its brilliant manipulation of time and space put it in a league of its own.

Writing for BBC Culture in 2015, author and book reviewer Jane Ciabattari polled 82 book critics from outside the UK and presented Wuthering Heights as number 7 in the resulting list of 100 greatest British novels. In 2018, Penguin presented a list of 100 must-read classic books and placed Wuthering Heights at number 71, saying: "Widely considered a staple of Gothic fiction and the English literary canon, this book has gone on to inspire many generations of writers – and will continue to do so". Writing in The Independent journalist and author Ceri Radford and news presenter, journalist, and TV producer Chris Harvey included Wuthering Heights in a list of the 40 best books to read during lockdown. Harvey said that "It's impossible to imagine this novel ever provoking quiet slumbers; Emily Brontë's vision of nature blazes with poetry".

== Setting ==
Novelist John Cowper Powys notes the importance of the setting:

By that singular and forlorn scenery—the scenery of the Yorkshire moors round her home—[Emily Brontë] was, however, in the more flexible portion of her curious nature inveterately influenced. She does not precisely describe this scenery—not at any length ... but it sank so deeply into her that whatever she wrote was affected by it and bears its desolate and imaginative imprint.

Likewise, Virginia Woolf suggests the importance of the Yorkshire landscape of Haworth to the poetic vision of both Emily and Charlotte Brontë:

[Who] if they choose to write in prose, [were] intolerant of its restrictions. Hence it is that both Emily and Charlotte are always invoking the help of nature. They both feel the need of some more powerful symbol of the vast and slumbering passions in human nature than words or actions can convey. They seized those aspects of the earth which were most akin to what they themselves felt or imputed to their characters, and so their storms, their moors, their lovely spaces of summer weather are not ornaments applied to decorate a dull page or display the writer's powers of observation—they carry on the emotion and light up the meaning of the book.

Wuthering Heights is an old house high on the Pennine moorland of West Yorkshire. Lockwood, the new tenant of the nearby Thrushcross Grange, provides the first description:

Wuthering Heights is the name of Mr Heathcliff's dwelling, "wuthering" being a significant provincial adjective, descriptive of the atmospheric tumult to which its station is exposed in stormy weather. Pure, bracing ventilation they must have up there at all times, indeed. One may guess the power of the north wind blowing over the edge by the excessive slant of a few stunted firs at the end of the house, and by a range of gaunt thorns all stretching their limbs one way, as if craving alms of the sun.

Lord David Cecil in Early Victorian Novelists (1934) drew attention to the contrast between the two main settings in Wuthering Heights:

We have Wuthering Heights, the land of storm; high on the barren moorland, naked to the shock of the elements, the natural home of the Earnshaw family, fiery, untamed children of the storm. On the other hand, sheltered in the leafy valley below, stands Thrushcross Grange, the appropriate home of the children of calm, the gentle, passive, timid Lintons.

Walter Allen, in The English Novel (1954), likewise "spoke of the two houses in the novel as symbolising 'two opposed principles which ... ultimately compose a harmony'". However, David Daiches, "in the 1965 Penguin English Library edition referred to Cecil's interpretation as being 'persuasively argued' though not fully acceptable". The entry on Wuthering Heights in the 2002 Oxford Companion to English Literature states that "the ending of the novel points to a union of 'the two contrasting worlds and moral orders represented by the Heights and the Grange'".

=== Inspiration for locations ===
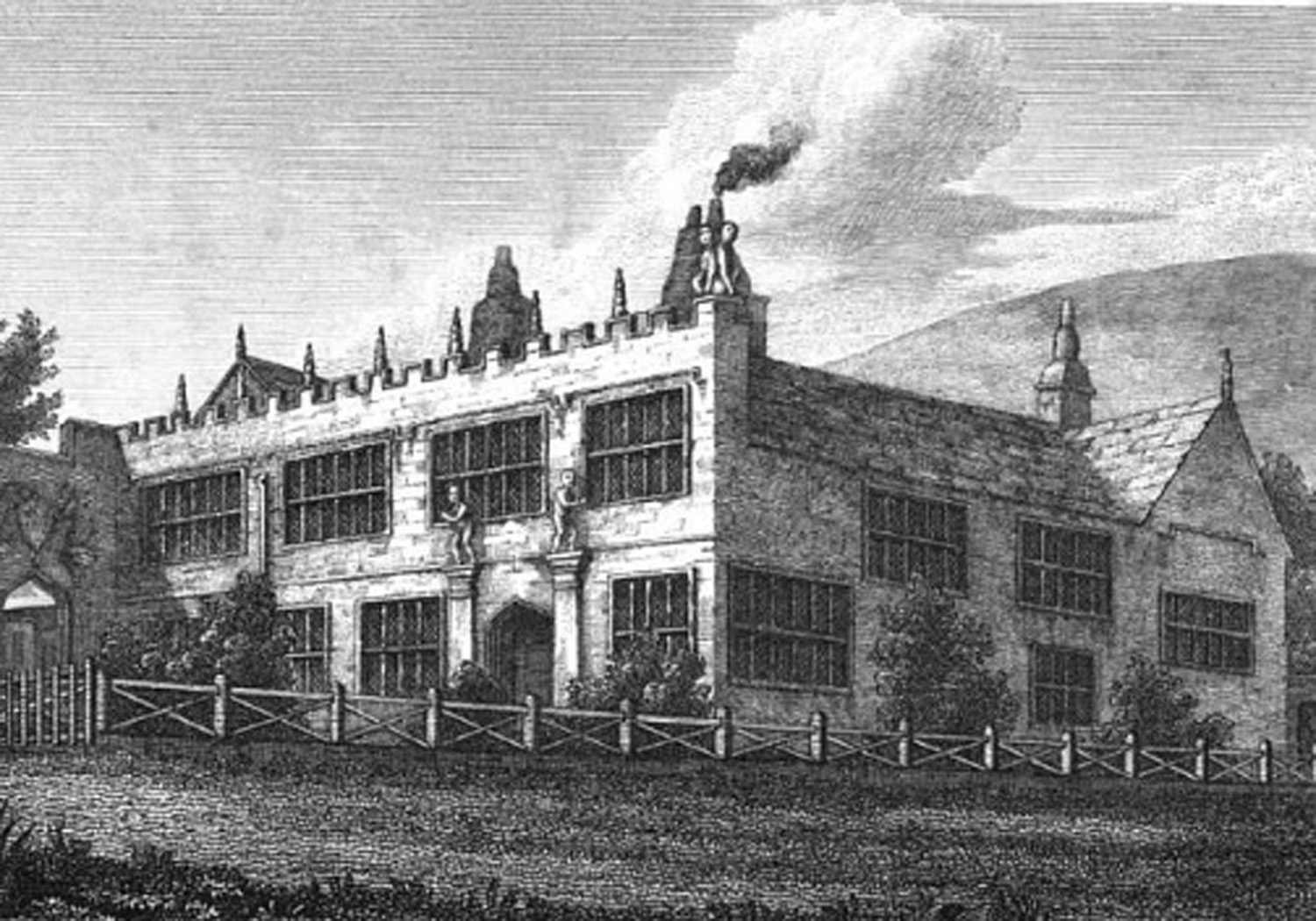
High Sunderland Hall in 1818, shortly before Emily Brontë saw the building.

There is no evidence that either Thrushcross Grange or Wuthering Heights is based on an actual building, but various locations have been speculated to have inspired them. Top Withens, a ruined farmhouse in an isolated area near the Haworth Parsonage, was suggested as the model for Wuthering Heights by Ellen Nussey, a friend of Charlotte Brontë. However, its structure does not match that of the farmhouse described in the novel. High Sunderland Hall, near Law Hill, Halifax where Emily worked briefly as a governess in 1838, now demolished, has also been suggested as a model for Wuthering Heights. However, it is too grand for a farmhouse.

Ponden Hall is famous for reputedly being the inspiration for Thrushcross Grange, since Brontë was a frequent visitor. However, it does not match the description in the novel and is more similar in size and appearance to the farmhouse at Wuthering Heights. The Brontë biographer Winifred Gerin believed that Ponden Hall was the original of Wildfell Hall, the old mansion in Anne Brontë's The Tenant of Wildfell Hall. Helen Smart, while noting that Thrushcross Grange has "traditionally been associated with ... Ponden Hall, Stanbury, near Haworth", sees Shibden Hall, Northowram, in Halifax parish, as more likely, referring to Hilda Marsden's article "The Scenic Background of Wuthering Heights".

== Point of view ==
Most of the novel is the story told by housekeeper Nelly Dean to Lockwood, though the novel uses several narrators (in fact, five or six) to place the story in perspective, or to present it from a variety of perspectives. Emily Brontë uses this frame story technique to narrate most of the story. Thus, for example, Lockwood, the first narrator of the story, tells the story of Nelly, who herself tells the story of another character. The use of a character like Nelly Dean is a literary device, a well-known convention taken from the Gothic novel, the function of which is to portray the events more mysteriously and excitingly.

Thus, the point of view comes from:

... a combination of two speakers who outline the events of the plot within the framework of a story within a story. The frame story is that of Lockwood, who informs us of his meeting with the strange and mysterious "family" living in almost total isolation in the stony uncultivated land of northern England. The inner story is that of Nelly Dean, who transmits to Lockwood the history of the two families during the last two generations. Nelly Dean examines the events retrospectively and attempts to report them as an objective eyewitness to Lockwood.

Critics have questioned the reliability of the two main narrators. The author has been described as sarcastic toward Lockwood, who fancies himself a world-weary romantic but comes across as an effete snob, and there are subtler hints that Nelly's perspective is influenced by her own biases.

The narrative, in addition, includes an excerpt from Catherine Earnshaw's old diary, and short sections narrated by Heathcliff, Isabella, and another servant.

== Influences ==
Brontë possessed an exceptional education in classical culture for a woman of the time. She was familiar with Greek tragedies and was a good Latinist. In addition she was especially influenced by the poets John Milton and William Shakespeare. There are echoes of and allusions to Shakespeare's tragedies, King Lear, Romeo and Juliet, Macbeth and Hamlet in Wuthering Heights.

Another major source of information for the Brontës was the periodicals that their father read, the Leeds Intelligencer and Blackwood's Edinburgh Magazine. Blackwood's Magazine provided knowledge of world affairs and was a source of material for the Brontës' early writing. Emily Brontë was probably aware of the debate on evolution. This debate had been launched in 1844 by Robert Chambers. It raised questions of divine providence and the violence that underlies the universe and relationships between living things.

Romanticism was also a major influence, which included the Gothic novel, the novels of Walter Scott and the poetry of Byron. Some feminist critics see the Brontës' fiction as prime examples of Female Gothic. It explores the domestic entrapment and subjection of women to patriarchal authority, and the attempts to subvert and escape such restriction. Emily Brontë's Cathy Earnshaw and Charlotte Brontë's Jane Eyre are both examples of female protagonists in such a role.

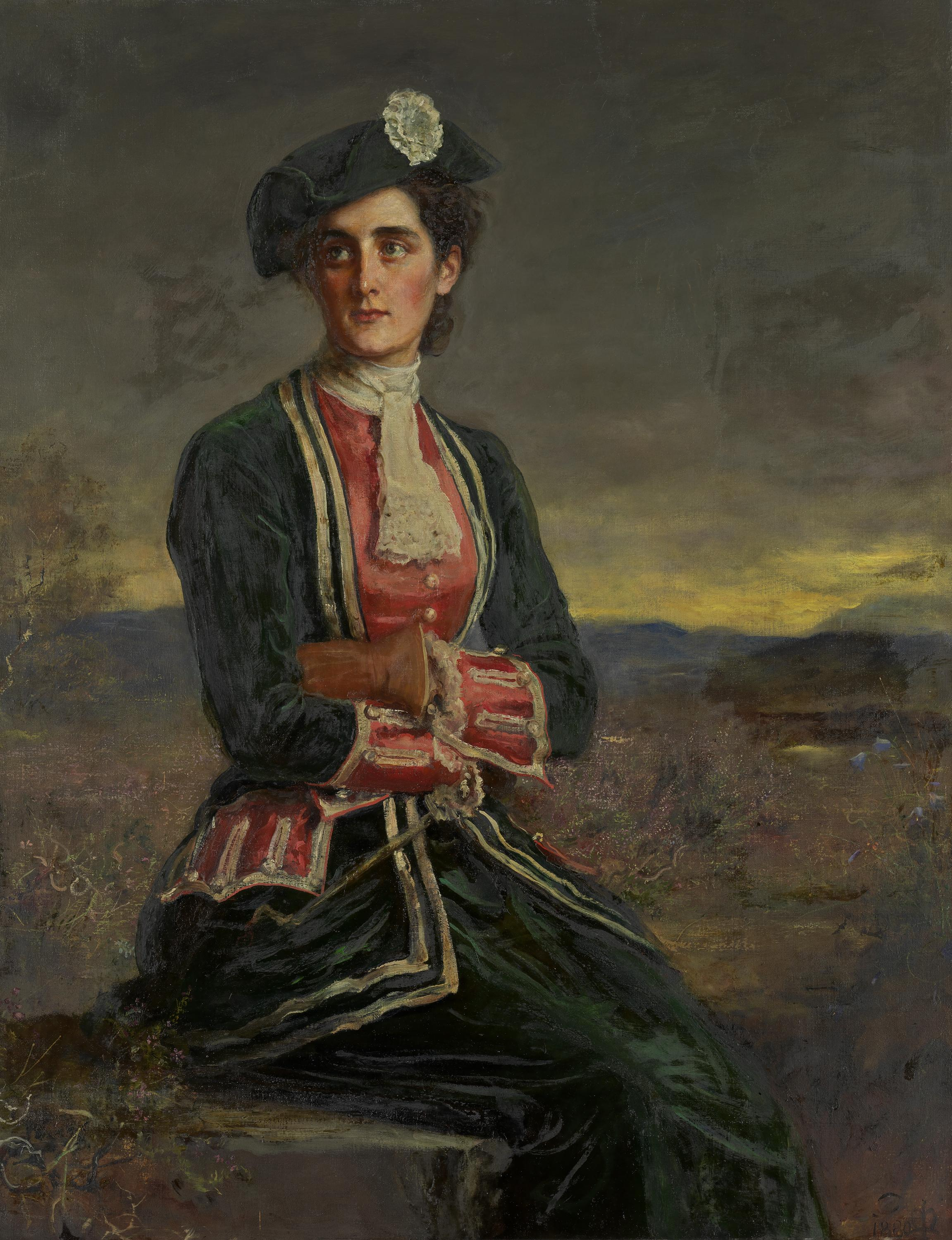
Diana Vernon from Walter Scott's Rob Roy, painted by John Everett Millais (1880)

According to Juliet Barker, Walter Scott's novel Rob Roy (1817) had a significant influence on Wuthering Heights, which, though "regarded as the archetypal Yorkshire novel ... owed as much, if not more, to Walter Scott's Border country". Rob Roy is set "in the wilds of Northumberland, among the uncouth and quarrelsome squirearchical Osbaldistones", while Cathy Earnshaw "has strong similarities with Diana Vernon, who is equally out of place among her boorish relations".

From 1833, Charlotte and Branwell's Angrian tales began to feature Byronic heroes. Such heroes had a strong sexual magnetism and passionate spirit, and demonstrated arrogance and black-heartedness. The Brontës had discovered Byron in an article in Blackwood's Magazine from August 1825. Byron had died the previous year. Byron became synonymous with the prohibited and audacious.

=== Romance tradition ===
Emily Brontë wrote in the romance tradition of the novel. Walter Scott defined this as "a fictitious narrative in prose or verse; the interest of which turns upon marvellous and uncommon incidents". Scott distinguished the romance from the novel, where (as he saw it) "events are accommodated to the ordinary train of human events and the modern state of society". Scott describes romance as a "kindred term" to novel. However, romances such as Wuthering Heights and Scott's own historical romances and Herman Melville's Moby Dick are often referred to as novels. Other European languages do not distinguish between romance and novel: "a novel is le roman, der Roman, il romanzo, en roman". This sort of romance is different from the genre fiction love romance or romance novel, with its "emotionally satisfying and optimistic ending". Emily Brontë's approach to the novel form was influenced by the gothic novel.

==== Gothic novel ====
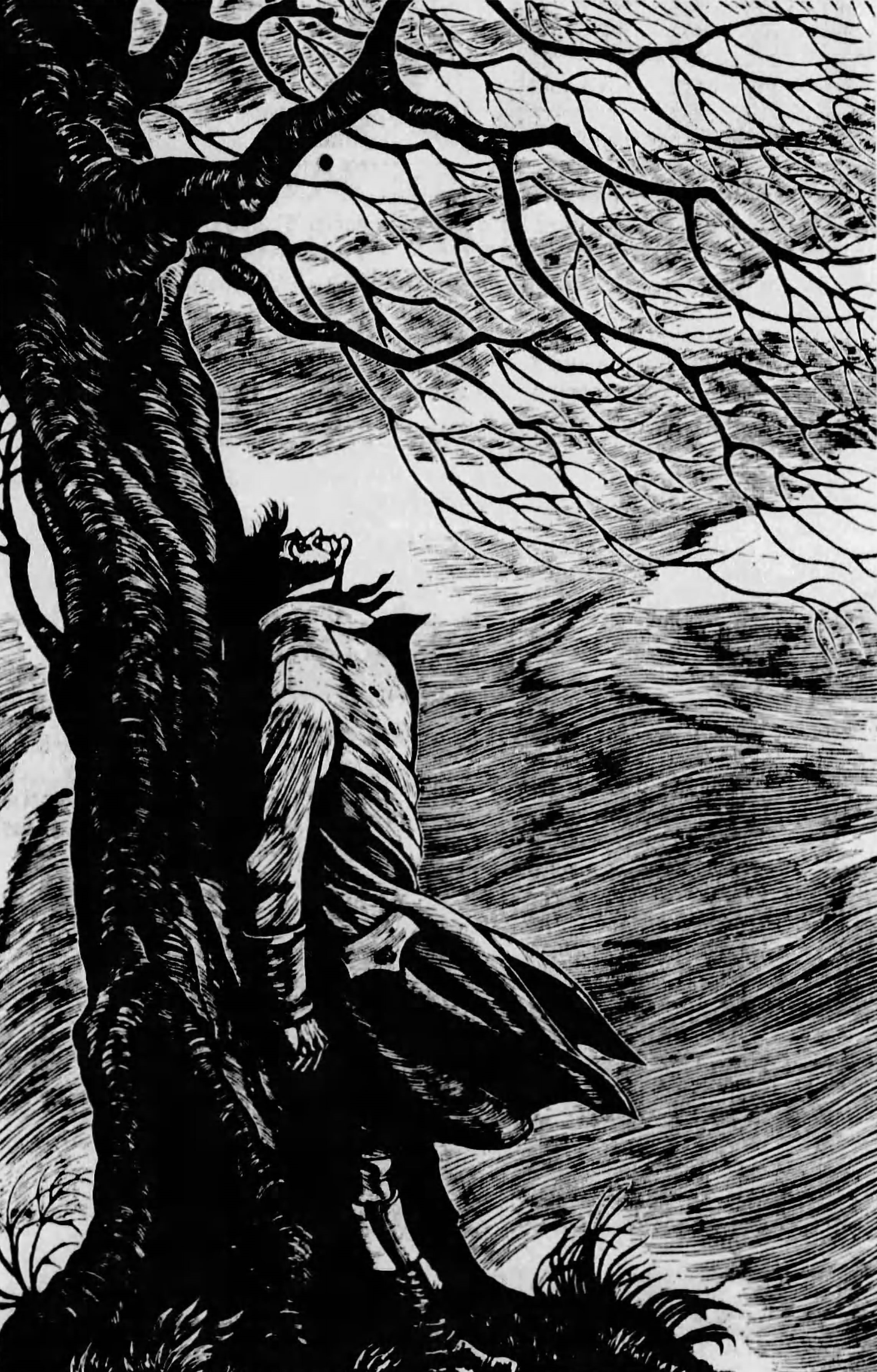
Heathcliff Under the Tree, wood engraving by Fritz Eichenberg from a 1943 edition

Horace Walpole's The Castle of Otranto (1764) is usually considered the first Gothic novel. Walpole's declared aim was to combine elements of the medieval romance, which he deemed too fanciful, and the modern novel, which he considered to be too confined to strict realism. Characteristically, 18th century gothic fiction in English placed their narrations in continental Europe, and set them firmly in the past.

More recently Ellen Moers, in Literary Women, developed a feminist theory that connects female writers such as Emily Brontë with gothic fiction. Catherine Earnshaw has been identified by some critics as a type of gothic demon because she "shape-shifts" in order to marry Edgar Linton, assuming a domesticity that is contrary to her true nature. It has also been suggested that Catherine's relationship with Heathcliff conforms to the "dynamics of the Gothic romance, in that the woman falls prey to the more or less demonic instincts of her lover, suffers from the violence of his feelings, and at the end is entangled by his thwarted passion". See also the discussion of the daemonic below, under "Religion".

At one point in the novel Heathcliff is thought a vampire. It has been suggested that both he and Catherine are, in fact, meant to be seen as vampire-like personalities.

Syndy McMillen Conger credits Brontë for liberating traditional gothic plot forms, which had become "overly rigid," and for bringing an "aesthetic respectability" to the gothic tradition. Conger further notes that Catherine Earnshaw is a departure from traditional gothic heroines, who were usually caught between a "dark seducer" and a "fair lover" in an external conflict, whereas Catherine differs in that she is "not simply placed between two lovers; she feels divided between two lovers."

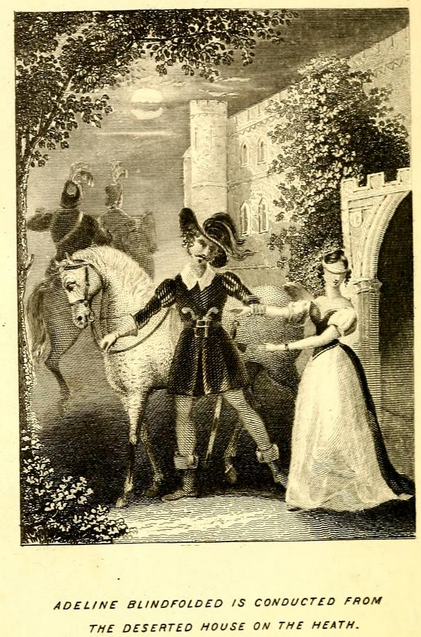
Frontispiece from The Romance of the Forest by Ann Radcliffe (1847 edition); showing the heroine blindfolded by her abductor

Carol Margaret Davison has proposed that the novel; as with all the Brontë sisters' fiction, should be understood as referencing the tradition of Female Gothic romances, represented especially by the works of Charlotte Smith and Ann Radcliffe, such as The Romance of the Forest and The Mysteries of Udolpho. The parallels are especially marked in the second volume, where Cathy is abducted by Heathcliff into Wuthering Heights and is forced into marriage with his son, Linton. This clearly draws on consistent tropes of the Female Gothic, where an 'angelic' and virtuous protagonist is typically trapped by a scheming bandit or aristocrat who intends to seize her property through a forced marriage. By 1847, the Female Gothic had passed out of fashion, but the Brontë sisters were still known to be avid readers. Characteristically, in the Female Gothic tradition, the female protagonist maintains defiance against her abductor's demands through a combination of impersonated feminine passivity, controlled emotional expression, and strategic swooning; all the while cultivating an alliance with a supporting 'feminised man' – who represents the story's romantic interest. Diane Long Hoeveler has tracked how this 'Gothic Feminism' promoted strategies of "professional femininity" in supposedly historic scenarios of fanciful peril, which its mainly middle-class female readership might apply against the everyday tyrannies of male-controlled 19th-century family and social structures. Where Emily Brontë departs from the tradition, is that Cathy – as Linton's widow – is open and fierce in her defiance, directly confronting Heathcliff face-to-face; and so achieves victory over her male assailant largely through her own agency and without any impersonation, albeit still relying on Hareton as support against Heathcliff's threatened brutality. Hoeveler sees the Gothic Feminism in the works of the three Brontë sisters as the ultimate expression of the feminist subtext within the Gothic tradition; so that in 'updating' and 'domesticating' the characteristic settings for Gothic fiction from European Renaissance castles to English provincial country houses, they opened scope for a revival of Gothic themes in fictions in Victorian settings, such as Bleak House and The Woman in White, that continues to this day.

== Themes ==
=== Childhood ===
Childhood is a central theme of Wuthering Heights. Emily Brontë "understands that 'The Child is 'Father of the Man' (Wordsworth, 'My heart leaps up', 1. 7)". Wordsworth, following philosophers of education, such as Rousseau, explored ideas about the way childhood shaped personality. One outcome of this was the German bildungsroman, or "novel of education", such as Charlotte Brontë's Jane Eyre (1847), Eliot's The Mill on the Floss (1860), and Dickens's Great Expectations (1861). Brontë's characters "are heavily influenced by their childhood experiences", though she is less optimistic than her contemporaries that suffering can lead to "change and renewal".

=== Class and money ===
Heathcliff leaves Gimmerton as a penniless labourer, but returning, three years later, he has both the wealth and manners of a gentleman. Nevertheless, Edgar initially refuses to admit him to the family rooms at Thrushcross Grange. Catherine, both angered and amused, mocks Edgar's class fastidiousness, proposing that they put up two tables in the parlour; one for the 'gentry' – Edgar and Isabella, and one for the 'lower orders' – herself and Heathcliff.

Lockwood arrives at Thrushcross Grange in 1801, a time when, according to Q.D. Leavis, "the old rough farming culture, based on a naturally patriarchal family life, was to be challenged, tamed and routed by social and cultural changes". By this date the Industrial Revolution was well underway and by 1847 was a dominant force in much of England, especially in West Yorkshire. This caused a disruption in "the traditional relationship of social classes" with an expanding upwardly mobile middle class, which created "a new standard for defining a gentleman" and challenged the traditional criteria of breeding and family, as well as the more recent criterion of character.

Marxist critic Arnold Kettle sees Wuthering Heights "as a symbolic representation of the class system of 19th-century England", with its concerns "with property-ownership, the attraction of social comforts", marriage, education, religion, and social status. Driven by a pathological hatred, Heathcliff uses against his enemies "their own weapons of money and arranged marriages", as well as "the classic methods of the ruling class, expropriation and property deals".

Later, another Marxist, Terry Eagleton, in Myths of Power: A Marxist Study of the Brontës (London: McMillan, 1975), further explores the power relationships between "the landed gentry and aristocracy, the traditional power-holders, and the capitalist, industrial middle classes". Haworth in the West Riding of Yorkshire was especially affected by changes to society and its class structure "because of the concentration of large estates and industrial centers" there.

==== Race ====
There has been debate about Heathcliff's race or ethnicity. In the novel, Heathcliff is first described as a "dark-skinned gipsy" with "black eyes", as well as later being said to be "as white as the wall behind him" and "pale...with an expression of mortal hate". Mr Linton, the Earnshaws' neighbour, suggests that he might be "a little Lascar (a 19th-century term for adult Indian or Malaysian sailors, specifically those working for the East India Company), or an American or Spanish castaway". There are fourteen very brief references to Heathcliff's appearance overall; Mr Earnshaw calls him "as dark almost as if it came from the devil", and Nelly Dean speculates fancifully regarding his origins thus: "Who knows but your father was Emperor of China, and your mother an Indian queen?" Novelist Caryl Phillips suggests that Heathcliff may have been an escaped slave, noting the similarities between the way Heathcliff is treated and the way slaves were treated at the time: he is referred to as "it", his name "served him" as both his "Christian and surname", and Mr Earnshaw is referred to as "his owner". Brontë had, though, already used such a method of naming characters several times in her Gondal writings. Maja-Lisa von Sneidern states that "Heathcliff's racial otherness cannot be a matter of dispute; Brontë makes that explicit", further noting that "by 1804 Liverpool merchants were responsible for more than eighty-four percent of the British transatlantic slave trade." However, it has been pointed out that the slave trade was triangular in structure and no enslaved people were held or processed there, only the goods for which they had been traded, that gypsies are officially designated as white in the UK, and that Heathcliff's description conforms to Dark Celts native to Britain, or Dark Irish (this latter is Terry Eagleton's conclusion). Michael Stewart sees Heathcliff's race as "ambiguous" and argues that Emily Brontë "deliberately gives us this missing hole in the narrative".

=== Feminist ===
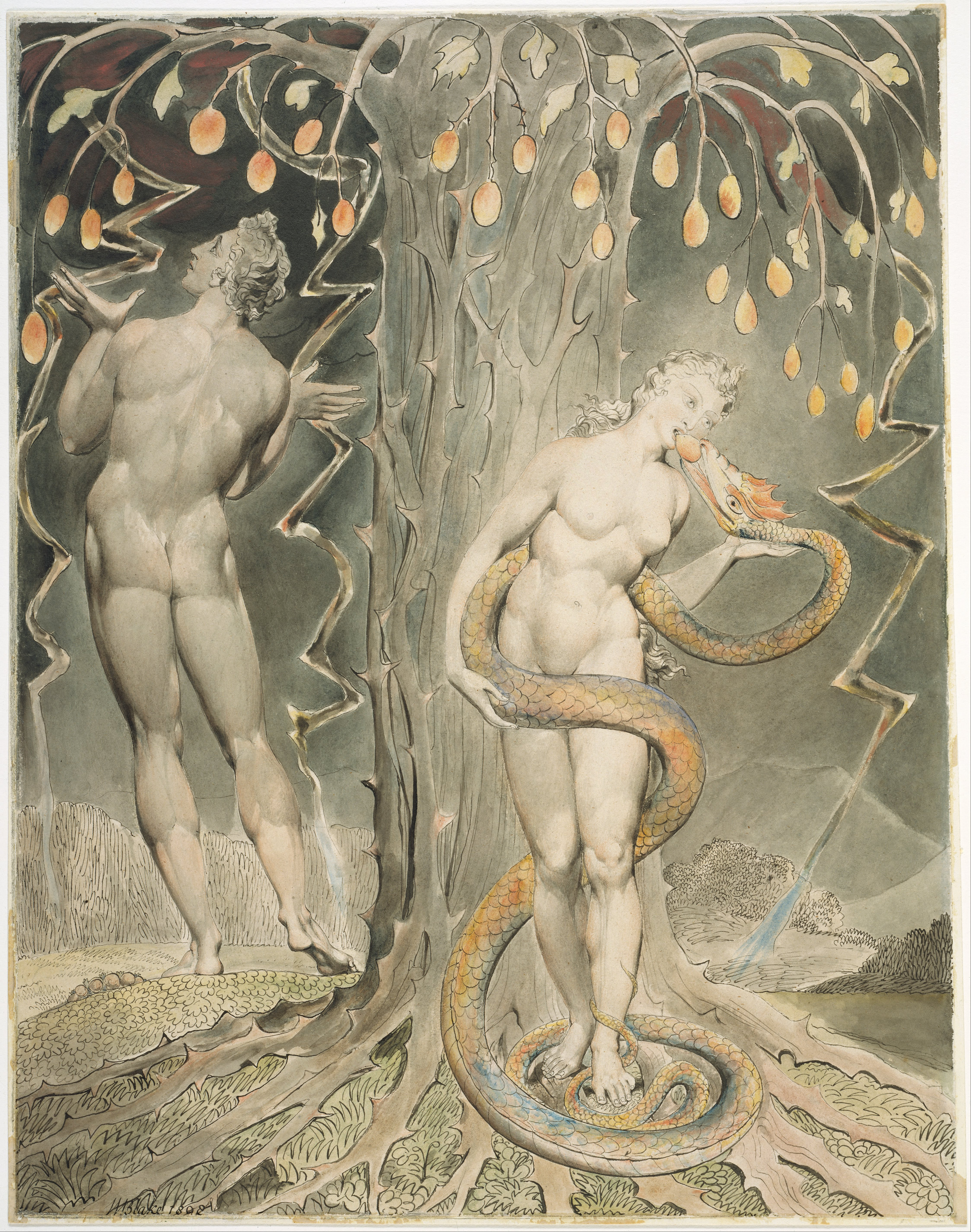
Illustration by William Blake of the fall of Eve in Paradise Lost by John Milton

Until the 1970s, feminist readings of Wuthering Heights were rare, reflecting a persistent tendency to see Heathcliff, rather than Catherine, as the centre of the novel. The landmark change came in 1979; as Chapter 8, 'Looking Oppositely; Emily Brontë's Bible of Hell', in The Madwoman in the Attic by Sandra Gilbert and Susan Gubar. Gilbert and Gubar read the novel as a mythic response to, and proto-feminist correction of, Milton's patriarchal Christian myth of human origins in Paradise Lost, where the figure of Eve is presented as subsidiary, behaviourally pliable, and ultimately destined for domestication. They acknowledge that there is no explicit citation of Milton in the novel, but maintain their argument from the numerous references to angels and devils, heaven and hell, salvation and damnation; pointing especially to the passage in volume one in which Heathcliff overhears Catherine's confessing to Nelly her intention to marry Edgar, where she recalls finding herself in heaven in a dream,

"heaven did not seem to be my home; and I broke my heart with weeping to come back to earth; and the angels were so angry that they flung me out into the middle of the heath on the top of Wuthering Heights; where I woke sobbing for joy."

For Gilbert and Gubar, the figure of Catherine Earnshaw is intended as a counterpart and direct opposite to Milton's figure of Satan; whereas Satan is a heavenly angel who falls through envy from a place of order, into Hell a place of chaos, Catherine is an untameable daughter of nature who falls from a place of apparent 'chaos' – Wuthering Heights; into a place of heavenly 'order' – Thrushcross Grange. But this 'fall' (in conventional Christian terms a fall into 'Grace') destroys Catherine; as for her, "the state of being [that] patriarchal Christianity calls "hell" is eternally, energetically delightful, whereas the state called "heaven" is rigidly hierarchical, Urizenic, and "kind" as a poison tree." Puberty and increasing sexual awareness lead to her being seduced into eating the 'cooked' foods of culture, and her consequent choice to marry Edgar severs her from her full self (and from Heathcliff, her girlhood alternative self) and imprisons her as a woman into a state of incapacity; locked into a culture destined for "tea-tables, sofas, crinolines and parsonages", yearning unavailingly to return to the enclosed-bed in her room in Wuthering Heights.

It was a commonplace at this time to associate literary creativity with male engenderment, such that the author 'fathers' his work; with the explicit corollary that female writing is marginalised either as trivial (and so uncreative), or unnatural (and so unfeminine). Gilbert's and Gubar's underlying thesis is that this patriarchal formulation of literary creativity was confronted in the nineteenth century by a canon of women writers, who proposed patriarchal understandings of creativity as forcing women into polarised artefactual categories; in the roles either of 'domestic angels', or of 'voracious monsters'. Consequently, in Wuthering Heights, Emily Brontë is understood as establishing a primal, counter-cultural, natural, and 'gynandrous' shared self of Catherine and Heathcliff, who then 'fall' through being separately absorbed into the world of patriarchal culture. Both of these sundered persons then 'fragments', through division into a destroyed and destructive remnant – Catherine as mad and dead, Heathcliff as bad and dangerous to know; and into a conformable, lesser and uncreative successor – for Catherine as Cathy (or Catherine II), and for Heathcliff as Hareton. For Gilbert and Gubar, the Victorian status quo of parlours and parsonages is a given destiny; so a mythic account of its origins must present the failure of 'nature' and the success of 'culture', within which the story of the second generation must progress as anticlimactic, predetermined, and tame.

Subsequent feminist critics, especially Gayatri Spivak, have questioned this thesis as obscuring the imperialistic subtext of the Brontës' writings; while others have developed the thesis further in proposing that the canon and experience of patriarchally-aware writers should be extended wider by race and class – to include 19th century writers in English such as Elizabeth Gaskell and Krupabai Satthianadhan. The house of Wuthering Heights in the novel – set within an active grouse moor, maintained for the 'manly' sports of the landed gentry and imperial elite – is as entrenched in male lineage inheritance and land possession as is Thrushcross Grange. With particular relevance to 'Wuthering Heights', Gilbert and Gubar's thesis that the second generation subverts their parents' rebellion and untameability is called into question. Carol Margaret Davison proposes that Gilbert and Gubar had improperly vilified and marginalised the earlier Female Gothic tradition stemming from Ann Radcliffe, leading to an undervaluation of the degree to which the revenge and abduction narrative of the second volume may celebrate rebellion and emancipation as much as does the freedom and fall narrative of the first. As with the abducted female protagonists of Radcliffe's works such as 'The Romance of the Forest' (1791), Cathy, as 'Catherine II', is indeed initially a dutiful angel, but like them but much more is then revealed as a 'daughter of nature'; and as Linton's widow becomes 'Catherine III' whom Heathcliff recognises as a "slut" and "witch", now sexually experienced, bold, self possessed, and fierce.

The Cathy who faces down Heathcliff, exposing his claimed possessions as brutality and bluff, is the fierce witch and slut who shows no subsequent indication of reverting into a domestic angel. Beth Newman notes that Gilbert and Gubar, in their treatment of Cathy, had characterised her as continuing throughout as the 'dutiful daughter' of Heathcliff's demands, serving the purposes of 'culture' where her mother had subverted it. They had maintained that this Cathy had merely 'impersonated' witchcraft when Lockwood first saw her, as Heathcliff had been merely 'impersonating' a gothic villain. Newman proposes rather that Cathy's 'witchcraft' encapsulates a very real challenge to Heathcliff's, very real, regime of surveillance and confinement; her resistance effected in substance through what Lockwood terms her "regardless look", Joseph calls her "bold een", and Heathcliff says are her "infernal eyes"; so undermining the "specular economy" of male domination. Whereas the voyeuristic 'gaze' is characteristically employed by men (like Lockwood and Heathcliff) to appropriate a woman's appearance for their own power and gratification; Cathy's "brilliant eyes" now consistently return and maintain this gaze without response; which Lockwood experiences as disconcerting, commanding and – ultimately – a force of lurking fascination, and which Heathcliff is unable to confound. Newman proposes that Hareton's eventual acknowledgement of this gaze, and developed capacity to respond to it (through eyes that are "precisely similar") in congeniality and humour, is envisaged to presage a relationship of "mutuality" that resists the structures of male dominance; even though it may still be unable actively to supplant the generality of wider patriarchal culture. As for their 'parents', so to for Cathy and Hareton, sexual awareness results in their leaving 'nature' for 'culture', but for them this transformation is a sharing, not a severing, enterprise.

=== Love ===
A 2007 British poll named Wuthering Heights the greatest love story of all time. However, "some of the novel's admirers consider it not a love story at all but an exploration of evil and abuse". Helen Small sees Wuthering Heights as being both "one of the greatest love stories in the English language" and at the same time one of the "most brutal revenge narratives". Some critics suggest that reading Wuthering Heights as a love story not only "romanticizes abusive men and toxic relationships but goes against Brontë's clear intent". Moreover, while a "passionate, doomed, death-transcending relationship between Heathcliff and Catherine Earnshaw Linton forms the core of the novel", Wuthering Heights:

... consistently subverts the romantic narrative. Our first encounter with Heathcliff shows him to be a nasty bully. Later, Brontë puts in Heathcliff's mouth an explicit warning not to turn him into a Byronic hero: After ... Isabella elop[es] with him, he sneers that she did so "under a delusion ... picturing in me a hero of romance".

"I am Heathcliff" is a frequently quoted phrase from the novel, and "the idea of ... perfect unity between the self and the other is age-old", so that Catherine says that she loves Heathcliff "because he's more myself than I am. Whatever our souls are made of, his and mine are the same" (Chapter IX). Likewise Lord David Cecil suggests that "the deepest attachments are based on characters' similarity or affinity", However Simone de Beauvoir, in her famous feminist work The Second Sex (1949), suggests that when Catherine says "I am Heathcliff": "her own world collapse(s) in contingence, for she really lives in his." Beauvoir sees this as "the fatal mirage of the ideal of romantic love ... transcendence ... in the superior male who is perceived as free".

Despite the passion between Catherine and Heathcliff, critics have, from early on, drawn attention to the absence of sex. In 1850 the poet and critic Sydney Dobell suggests that "we dare not doubt [Catherine's] purity", and the Victorian poet Swinburne concurs, referring to their "passionate and ardent chastity". Elizabeth Hardwick characterises the novel as a "virgin's story";

"Cathy is as hard, careless, and destructive as Heathcliff. She too has a sadistic nature. The love the two feel for each other is a longing for an impossible completion. Consolations do not appear; nothing in the domestic or even in the sexual life seems to the point in this book"

She suggests that, because there is no possibility of sexual or domestic fulfillment in this relationship, it inexorably drives the two principals towards mutual annihilation amid the careless destruction of anyone else in their way. More recently Terry Eagleton suggests their relationship is sexless, "because the two, unknown to themselves, are half-siblings, with an unconscious fear of incest".

=== Morality ===
Some early Victorian reviewers complained about how Wuthering Heights dealt with violence and immorality. One called it "a compound of vulgar depravity and unnatural horrors".

Brontë was supposedly unaware of "the limits on polite expression" expected of Victorian novelists. Her characters use vulgar language, "cursing and swearing". Though the daughter of a curate, Brontë shows little respect for formal religious observance in the novel; the only strongly religious characters in Wuthering Heights are Joseph, who is usually seen as satirizing "the joyless version of Methodism that the Brontë children were exposed to through their Aunt Branwell"; Nelly Dean, who persists fruitlessly in urging Heathcliff to repent; and also Cathy, whose expressed love for both Linton and Hareton displays strong elements of religious redemption. But both Catherine and Heathcliff apparently embrace "heathenism". A major influence on how Brontë depicts amoral characters was the stories her father Patrick Brontë told, about "the doings" of people around Haworth that his parishioners told him, "stories which 'made one shiver and shrink from hearing' (Charlotte's friend Ellen Nussey reported)", which were "full of grim humour" and violence, stories Emily Brontë took "as a truth".

Shortly after Emily Brontë's death G.H. Lewes wrote in Leader Magazine:

Curious enough is to read Wuthering Heights and The Tenant of Wildfell Hall, and remember that the writers were two retiring, solitary, consumptive girls! Books, coarse even for men, coarse in language and coarse in conception, the coarseness apparently of violence and uncultivated men – turn out to be the productions of two girls living almost alone, filling their loneliness with quiet studies, and writing their books from a sense of duty, hating the pictures they drew, yet drawing them with austere conscientiousness! There is matter here for the moralist or critic to speculate on.

=== Property ===
As Anne Jamison points out, when Lockwood visits Heathcliff in October 1801, his first words are "Thrushcross Grange is my own, sir", introducing a major theme of property ownership. At the end of the novel, when Lockwood returns to Wuthering Heights the following October, he finds Hareton as master, while the Michaelmas rents for the Thrushcross Grange estate are being collected by Cathy Heathcliff (or rather by Nelly Dean on her behalf). Heathcliff is now dead, as is his ambition to seize ownership of both great estates and their contents, and then to pass these on to his descendants. In Emily Brontë's narration, this is a long-drawn-out campaign of revenge; ruthlessly exploiting the English laws of property that empowered men to control women and enforce compliance on their offspring. At intervals, the characters are presented as arguing over the legalities of Heathcliff's possessions of property; with Heathcliff's claims being challenged by both Nelly and Cathy. It is unclear in these places whether Heathcliff is to be understood as bluffing, or as misconstruing the (then) law.

Heathcliff's attentions were turned first to Thrushcross Grange. By eloping with Isabella, he acquires control of her own inheritance of personal property through the common law doctrine of coverture. Furthermore, he knows that the Grange estate is entailed in the male line by Mr Linton's will, so that if Edgar fails to produce a son, the ownership of the landed estate must pass by a second entail through Isabella to her son and his, which indeed happens. Under the will, Edgar has possession of Thrushcross Grange, but only as a tenant for life; his daughter, Cathy, has no inheritance in her grandfather's will, from which Heathcliff wrongly concludes that she cannot inherit at all. Heathcliff then turns to Wuthering Heights, where his old enemy Hindley is drinking and gaming his inheritance away. Heathcliff, now mysteriously wealthy, can return to the house as a rent-paying tenant, offering to pay Hindley's debts through pressing on him a succession of mortgages on his lands, such that when Hindley dies in questionable circumstances, the whole estate is mortgaged to the full.

Mortgages were then the standard instrument for raising capital from land as, for instance, for a daughter's marriage portion or a son's university tuition. The mortgagor (Hindley) conveyed the land to the mortgagee (Heathcliff) by an indenture, that would be accompanied (commonly on the reverse) by a counterpart conveyance back from mortgagee to mortgagor once the loan principal had been fully repaid with accumulated interest (usually at 5% per year). There was commonly no fixed term; annual repayments would be higher in good years and lower in poor ones, but repayment might well be expected to extend over two decades or more if the land were mortgaged for its full value of 'twenty years' purchase'. Crucially, the indenture would be qualified by the phrase 'providing always' that the re-conveyance would still be activated if ever the full principal and interest were to have been repaid, even if the mortgagor may have defaulted on expected annual payments in the meantime. This unfailing right of 'equity of redemption' is the essence of an early modern mortgage. When Hindley dies, and the land passes to his six-year-old son, Hareton, the law will support Heathcliff's taking temporary possession of the Wuthering Heights estate to ensure that his mortgages are repaid, but while Hareton retains equity of redemption, Heathcliff cannot have unimpeded ownership of the land or sell it. So long as the mortgaged land is yielding its regular income, the courts of equity will assume that a full repayment remains a possibility, and will not allow an order for foreclosure. C.P. Sangar concludes however, that Heathcliff should be understood to have intended to establish eventual full ownership of the land for himself through the principle of adverse possession; but for him to do so he must have controlled the estate without challenge from Hareton continuously for twenty years, and as matters occur Heathcliff dies after eighteen.

Two months after their elopement, Isabella had fled Heathcliff's cruelty, taking refuge in the south, where she gave birth to and raised their son, Linton. When Linton was twelve, Isabella died, so Edgar brought him back to Thrushcross Grange as its presumptive inheritor; but Heathcliff insisted on his parental rights and took him to Wuthering Heights. This sets the stage for the third Act in Heathcliff's property revenge drama. Heathcliff has prospective control, directly or through his son, of the landed estates of Wuthering Heights and Thrushcross Grange; but not of Edgar Linton's 'personal property' or 'moveables'; which in law are all his possessions that are not land or tied to land; so his money, valuables, furniture (though not tables and chairs), pictures, books and clothes; but also the livestock on his farms and the crops in his barns. In particular, Edgar has been saving regularly to create a marriage portion for Cathy. According to the doctrine of 'coverture' in the common law, the moveable property that a wife brought into a marriage – in Cathy's case the property she was holding when Heathcliff abducts her – would come under the control of Linton for the duration of his life; while moveables she acquired during the marriage – as with Cathy's inheritance from Edgar – would become Linton's to dispose of without restriction. Edgar is on the horns of a dilemma; he wants to assure Cathy of continuing to live at the Grange after his death, and the only way to do this would appear to be his consenting to her marrying Linton Heathcliff, but this would result in her inheritance of moveable property being lost to Heathcliff's control. Edgar sees the danger of this, and in his final illness seeks to forestall it by altering his will to place Cathy's inheritance of moveables into a trust for the benefit of her offspring, which Linton could not access. This was a common practice in landed families – referred to as a 'separate estate' – and would have assured Cathy of a widows jointure, or protected lifetime income, on Linton's death, but Edgar's tactic is frustrated in that his lawyer, Mr Green, turned out to have been suborned by Heathcliff; so finding a reason not to attend Edgar's bedside, which we subsequently understand to be witnessing Linton's will.

Cathy and Linton marry, and ownership of the moveable property of Thrushcross Grange must pass through Cathy to Linton on Edgar's subsequent death. As too must the landed property by Mr Linton's will. But Linton himself is also sickening badly; so, in the final Act of Heathcliff's revenge, he pressurises Linton into making a will by which all his (and so Heathcliff intends Cathy's and Edgar's) moveables would be bequeathed on Linton's death to Heathcliff himself. By contrast, the statutory expectation was that a widow should receive in the will, at least a third of all her husband's moveables for life – as this was the standard where a husband died intestate – but a lower widow's share might be allowed by will where she was otherwise already provided for. The ecclesiastical probate courts will seek confirmation from the executors that this is the case. In some 90% of Yorkshire wills in this period, either a man's widow or his daughter is named as his executor (or executrix in the terminology of the ecclesiastical courts); and indeed it appears that Cathy is named in the unaltered will as Edgar's sole executrix, with his moveables at her "own disposal". There was no bar on a minor serving as executrix. Still, if the sole named executrix is a minor of marriageable age (as was a common occurrence when either a daughter or widow was named), then the probate court will require them to choose a 'curator', an adult male who would act both as their legal guardian and with them as co-executor until they come of age. As Linton's widow, Cathy's choice of curator is entirely her own; consequently, without Cathy's active co-operation, Heathcliff would not be able to legally access property devised either in Edgar's will or in Linton's. Heathcliff conceals Linton's will's having been made from Cathy – and the rest of the household – until after Linton's death; so it may be understood that Heathcliff himself is named in that will as sole executor; with Cathy apparently ignored as executrix, which the probate court would consider highly irregular, and would have discretion to remedy.

This is the point at which Lockwood first enters the narrative of events, as Heathcliff boasts of his power and property and Cathy responds to his claims with defiance, undisguised hostility and contempt.

Although Heathcliff's victory may have appeared complete, the same legal doctrines and procedures he had exploited could also be used against him. Heathcliff may well boast that he has been able to acquire the Thrushcross Grange moveables through Linton's will, but this is only the moveables; Linton, as a minor, could not bequeath the Thrushcross Grange land, nor before 1834 could a son of any age bequeath land to his father (which the common law barred as 'unnatural'). With Linton's death, and once it is apparent that Cathy is not carrying his child, the second entail in the will fails; and ownership of the Thrushcross Grange estate must instead pass by intestate succession to the only surviving direct descendant of old Mr Linton, who is Cathy Heathcliff herself. Unbeknownst to Lockwood (or the reader), Heathcliff's dream of supplanting the Linton and Earnshaw families with his own progeny now rested on Cathy's being pregnant. Otherwise, Heathcliff's continued possession of the Thrushcross Grange estate after Linton's death is legally questionable; depending as it does on claiming a lifetime income as 'curtesy' from his marriage to Isabella, even though Isabella was never herself in possession of it. If Cathy were not a minor, destitute, and alone, she could readily overturn Heathcliff's possession. Equally, Heathcliff's continued possession of Wuthering Heights is legally questionable, as the profits from the estate – had they been applied to his mortgages in accordance with Heathcliff's legal obligations – would most likely have paid them off by now. Moreover, Heathcliff is clearly defaulting on his rent and is improperly continuing to act as Hareton's guardian, though he is now twenty-three. If Hareton, though of age, were not utterly uneducated, destitute, and alone, he could readily overturn Heathcliff's possession. In the climax of the second volume, Cathy confronts Heathcliff directly with the accusation of his being in unlawful possession of her lands and money, and of Hareton's lands and money. There now being no chance of a Heathcliff grandchild, bringing these two young persons together exposes a major flaw in Heathcliff's scheming to control his enemies' property, not the least because Hareton would now be an obvious choice as Cathy's ally and co-executor.

A seriously complicating factor frustrating Heathcliff's designs is that, in this period in England, property ownership was subject to four distinct but overlapping bodies of law, each with its own courts and particular fields of application. The common law applied for the ownership and inheritance of agricultural 'freehold' land, debts and commercial contracts; ecclesiastical law (and the ecclesiastical courts) applied for the ownership and inheritance of moveables, and the probate of wills; while equity and the Court of Chancery applied for marriage settlements, guardianships, trusts and mortgages, but also provided remedies for some clearly unfair (inequitable) systematic outcomes from the rigidity of the common law. In addition, inheritance of property in towns was commonly subject to the application of local manorial courts and laws (though these play no part in the plot of this novel). So, while Heathcliff's claim to a lifetime income from Thrushcross Grange, from Isabella's curtesy, would be determined in common law, his claim to Wuthering Heights, from Hindley's mortgages, would be determined in the courts of equity. In contrast, his claim to Edgar's moveables, from Linton's will, would be determined in the ecclesiastical courts. Guiding principles in one body of law might be disregarded – or contradicted – in another. The common law doctrine of coverture may have acted to bar married women and minors from having a distinct legal personality, but in the courts of ecclesiastical law, for the majority of litigants receiving grants of probate or administration were female, married or not. So long as Cathy does not access her inheritance from Edgar for her own purposes, she may hold it indefinitely as his executrix without its falling to Linton (or Heathcliff) under coverture. If contested by actions in the courts of ecclesiastical law or equity, Heathcliff's acquired possessions of property would be notably less secure than they may have appeared for actions in common law courts.

Each of the four bodies of English property law could assure a lifetime income to support a widow out of their husband's estate; 'freebench' from copyhold land in manorial law, 'reasonable parts' from moveables in ecclesiastical law, 'jointure' from a marriage settlement in equity, and 'dower' from freehold land in common law. In administering a deceased's estate, these rights in widowhood took priority over unsecured creditors or stipulations in the will. Dower and jointure functioned as legal alternatives; a widow without a jointure could always claim dower (assuming her husband owned real property), though at this date, as almost all propertied daughters married with a settlement, they would expect jointure rather than dower in widowhood. Equally, 'separate estate' and 'reasonable parts' were legal alternatives; a widow with a separate estate could not claim reasonable parts of her husband's moveables. But as Heathcliff has prevented Cathy from being provided with a marriage settlement and jointure in Edgar's will, and as she has no share in the moveables from Linton's, she must consequently be legally entitled to claim dower from Linton's freeholds. This dower would constitute lifetime possession of one third of the Thrushcross Grange lands; and Linton's executors' assurance of this would be a condition of their being granted probate.

As Heathcliff has no next of kin and makes no will, at his death his real property must escheat to the Crown. It would seem that Cathy's and Hareton's ownerships of the two landed estates should not be at risk of escheat, but that the possibility of Edgar's moveables being included with Heathcliff's escheat as bona vacantia would rest on Linton's dying will. In respect of which, both Edgar's and Linton's estates-at-death would first need to have undergone probate before the ecclesiastical courts; a process that could take a year, would require Heathcliff to have obtained grants of probate or letters of administration and to have commissioned a thorough inventory of Thrushcross Grange and its contents; and would likely also include an investigation by the Rural Dean (as the ordinary of the ecclesiastical court) into the circumstances in which Linton's will had been made, into the choice of a co-executor alongside Cathy for Edgar's will, and into Cathy's standing as Linton's widow. Without strong evidence supporting its reliability, the ecclesiastical courts would prefer to set aside a will from a husband where there is no "reasonable" provision for his widow (and potential unborn children). There is no indication in the book that any of this had happened before Heathcliff himself dies; and it would be a very different novel if there was. As Cathy is receiving neither dower nor jointure, we should presume that neither will has yet been granted probate.

What is related in the final chapters is that Cathy and Hareton have now come to love one another and intend to marry. As Lockwood says, "Together, they would brave Satan and all his legions", with the implication that all Heathcliff's machinations would fall apart under their common assault. Moreover, Cathy and Hareton now have a year's rents from the Thrushcross Grange estate, so are in the financial position of being able to initiate legal proceedings. Assuming that Heathcliff had been unable to seek a grant of probate for Edgar's estate, and had not yet done so for Linton's, Cathy would then be required to do so as Linton's widow and Edgar's daughter. Since the ecclesiastical courts would be likely to approve Cathy's choosing Hareton as her curator and co-executor for both wills – there being no other realistic option – the couple's combined evidence on Linton's physical and mental incapacity in his final days should prove decisive in determining Linton's will.

=== Religion ===
Emily Brontë came from a religious family, though she was an infrequent churchgoer and, unlike her sisters, did not teach in Sunday School. Throughout the novel, she keeps a clear tally of which characters regularly attend church services, and which children are also attended at home for religious and educational instruction by the curate. It transpires that, without the extra income from educating the Earnshaw and Linton families, and because these families have been failing to augment the chapel's endowments, the stipend for the chapel-of-ease at Gimmerton has become insufficient to support an assistant curate, so that by the end of the narrative the chapel has ceased to be open for Sunday services for any churchgoing residents of the area. Nelly upbraids Heathcliff towards the end of his life for his destructive irreligion.

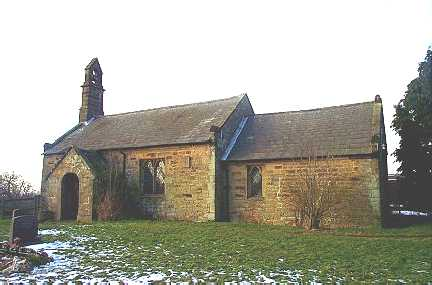
Ancient Yorkshire chapel of ease in its kirkyard:Thornton-le-Beans Chapel

Nevertheless, the kirkyard around the Gimmerton chapel continues to be used for burials throughout the narrative, including that of Heathcliff himself, so that the last words in the text, 'that quiet earth', refer to this ground. For the most part, the Linton family is buried within a sculptured family vault inside the chapel, while the Earnshaws' forebears are buried alongside the chapel, amongst the graves of the Gimmerton population in general. Catherine, however, had requested that her grave should be at the far corner of the kirkyard, at a point where the moorland heathers and bilberries had climbed over the wall. Edgar, at his request, was eventually interred on one side of her, while Heathcliff was buried on the other; at his own instruction, without religious ceremony. Adjoining the kirkyard is a two-roomed curacy house, which, when Lockwood first arrived, had become ruinous, the chapel itself still then being in repair. However, by his return visit, this too is becoming dilapidated. Maintaining the chapel and kirkyard (though not the curacy house) is the responsibility of the chapel sexton; we are to assume that Edgar had continued to pay him for the upkeep of the chapel, but that Heathcliff had not.

Where the deceased had made a will, responsibility for burial arrangements and any funeral service rested with their executors; otherwise, it was the duty of their next-of-kin. In the novel, Nelly is asked to arrange the burial of Hindley – indicating that there cannot have then been a will; and also undertakes the same office for Heathcliff, for the same reason. Edgar does leave a will, but again it is Nelly who organises the burial, resisting Green's attempt to meddle with the arrangements. It is highly unlikely, though, that Nelly, a servant, would have been nominated in Edgar's will; so she must have been acting under the authority of a named executrix, almost certainly Cathy.

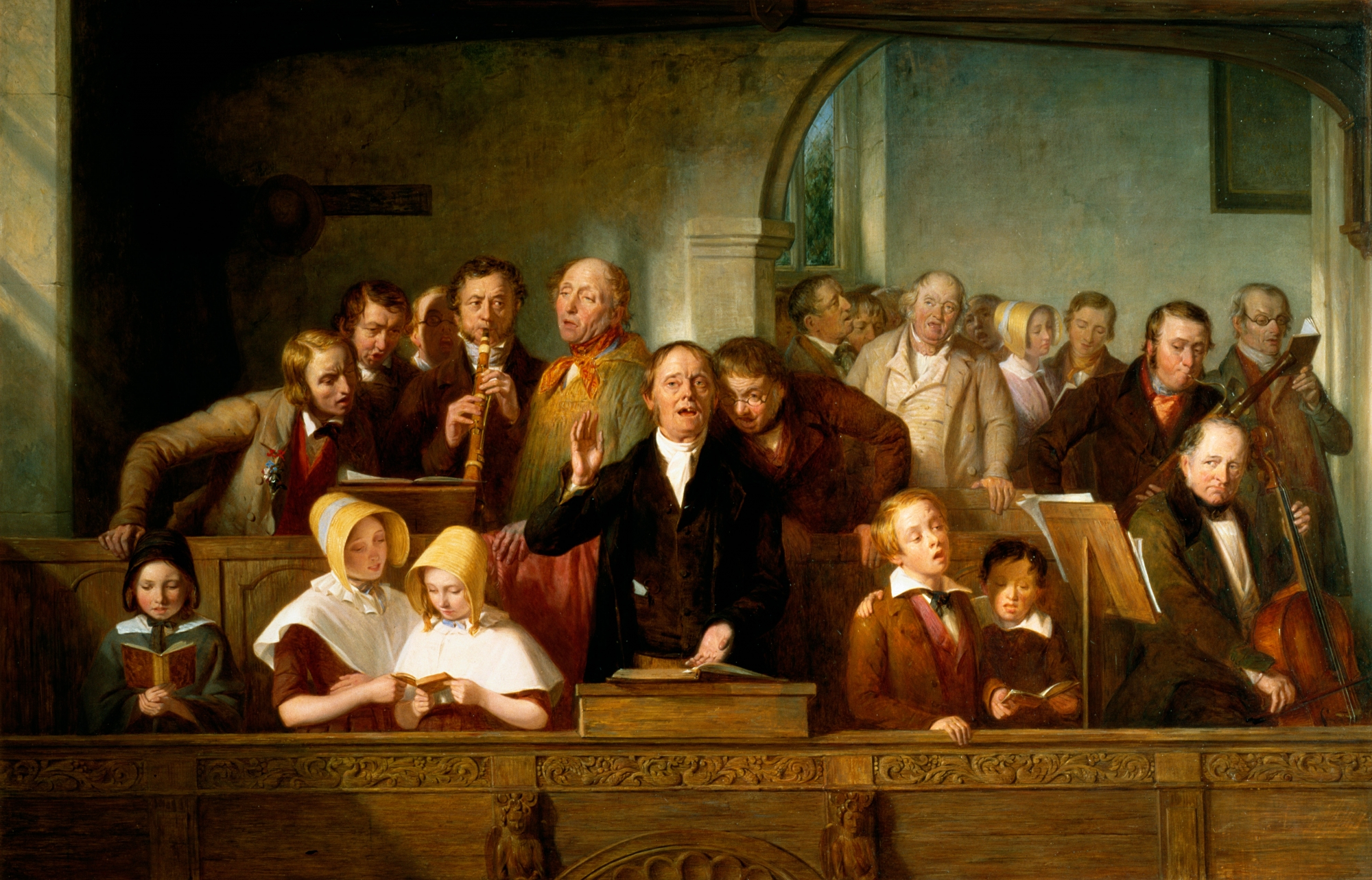
West Gallery choir; with instruments corresponding to those of the Gimmerton Band;1847 by Thomas Webster

When characters in the novel talk of 'going to church', they are attending this lonely moorland chapel, by whose kirkyard stands the marker stone where the road to Thrushcross Grange branches off towards Wuthering Heights. The township of Gimmerton itself is some way further down the valley, and we are to understand Gimmerton as one of many townships in a characteristically vast West Yorkshire parish, swollen in population by the Industrial Revolution. The ancient parish of Bradford covered 13 such townships; that of Halifax next door covered 34. Both parishes on this date had scattered populations of nearly 20,000, served by several ancient chapels of ease for Sunday worship and burials. From 1754 to 1825, weddings could normally be celebrated only in the parish church itself (as that is where the Banns would have been read), often a considerable distance away; although marriages of the gentry by common licence – as had been the case for that of Edgar and Catherine – would have been allowed in the Gimmerton chapel. Emily Brontë provides an extended dream narrative of a service in the chapel. Still, there is no account of actual worship within it, except that the singing was accompanied by a west gallery choir, with trumpet, trombone, clarinets, horns, bassoons and bass viol; who call at Wuthering Heights at Christmas 1777.

Emily "never as far as we know, wrote anything which overtly criticised conventional religion. But she also has the reputation of being a rebel and iconoclast, driven by a spirit more pagan than orthodox Christian." Derek Traversi, for example, sees in Wuthering Heights "a thirst for religious experience, 'which is not Christian'. It is this spirit which moves Catherine to exclaim, 'Surely you and everybody have a notion that there is, or should be, an existence of yours beyond you. What were the use of my creation if I were entirely contained here?'" (Ch. IX).

Thomas John Winnifrith, author of The Brontes and Their Background: Romance and Reality (Macmillan, 1977), argues that the allusions to Heaven and Hell are more than metaphors, and have a religious significance, because "for Heathcliff, the loss of Catherine is literally Hell ... 'existence after losing her would be Hell' (Ch. xiv, p. 117)." Likewise, in the final scene between them, Heathcliff writhes "in the torments of Hell (XV)".

==== Daemonic ====
The eminent German Lutheran theologian and philosopher Rudolph Otto, author of The Idea of the Holy, saw in Wuthering Heights "a supreme example of 'the daemonic' in literature". Otto links the "daemonic" with "a genuine religious experience". Lisa Wang argues that in both Wuthering Heights, and in her poetry, Emily Brontë concentrates on "the non-conceptual", or what Rudolf Otto has called 'the non-rational' aspect of religion ... the primal nature of religious experience over and above its doctrinal formulations". This corresponds with the dictionary meaning: "of or relating to an inner or attendant spirit, esp. as a source of creative inspiration or genius". This meaning was important to the Romantic movement.

However, the word daemon can also mean "a demon or devil", and that is equally relevant to Heathcliff, whom Peter McInerney describes as "a Satanic Don Juan". Heathcliff is also "dark-skinned", "as dark almost as if it came from the devil". Likewise Charlotte Brontë described him "'a man's shape animated by demon life – a Ghoul – an Afreet'". In Arabian mythology, an "afreet", or ifrit, is a powerful jinn or demon. However, John Bowen believes that "this is too simple a view", because the novel presents an alternative explanation of Heathcliff's cruel and sadistic behaviour; that is, that he has suffered terribly: "is an orphan; ... is brutalised by Hindley; ... relegated to the status of a servant; Catherine marries Edgar".

==== Possession ====
Anne Jamison plots the continuing theme of landed 'possession' throughout the novel, and, by extension, the theme of possession in general. The first volume chronicles the developing relationship between Catherine and Heathcliff as one of mutual possession: voracious, all-encompassing, and disregarding all others. Not only are the two principals intensely possessive of one another, their possessiveness extends all around them; for Catherine as possession of other persons – Edgar Linton and his family in particular; for Heathcliff as material possession of land, money and valuables. In the second volume of the novel, after Catherine's death; their mutual possessiveness runs destructively amok. Heathcliff continues compulsively scheming to amass under his control all the surviving persons, lands and valuables of both the Earnshaw and Linton families, and eventually succeeds in doing so; but all the while finds himself increasingly under the possessive control of his dead partner – seeing her eyes in the faces of Cathy and Hareton, being aware of her presence and 'almost seeing' her in his desperation, and eventually finding himself prevented by her control from taking actions of any sort, to the point where he starves himself to death.

=== Storm and calm ===
Critics have explored the contrasts between Thrushcross Grange and the Wuthering Heights farmhouse, and between their inhabitants. Lord David Cecil argued for "cosmic forces as the central impetus and controlling force in the novel" and suggested that there is a unifying structure underlying Wuthering Heights: "two spiritual principles: the principle of the storm, ... and the principle of calm", which he further argued were not, "in spite of their apparent opposition", in conflict. Dorothy Van Ghent, however, refers to "a tension between two kinds of reality" in the novel: "civilized manners" and "natural energies".

== Adaptations ==
=== Film and television ===
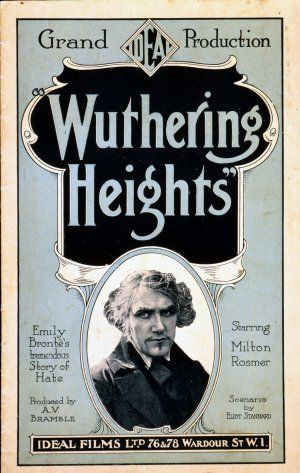
Poster for 1920 adaptation of Wuthering Heights, billed as "Emily Brontë's tremendous Story of Hate"

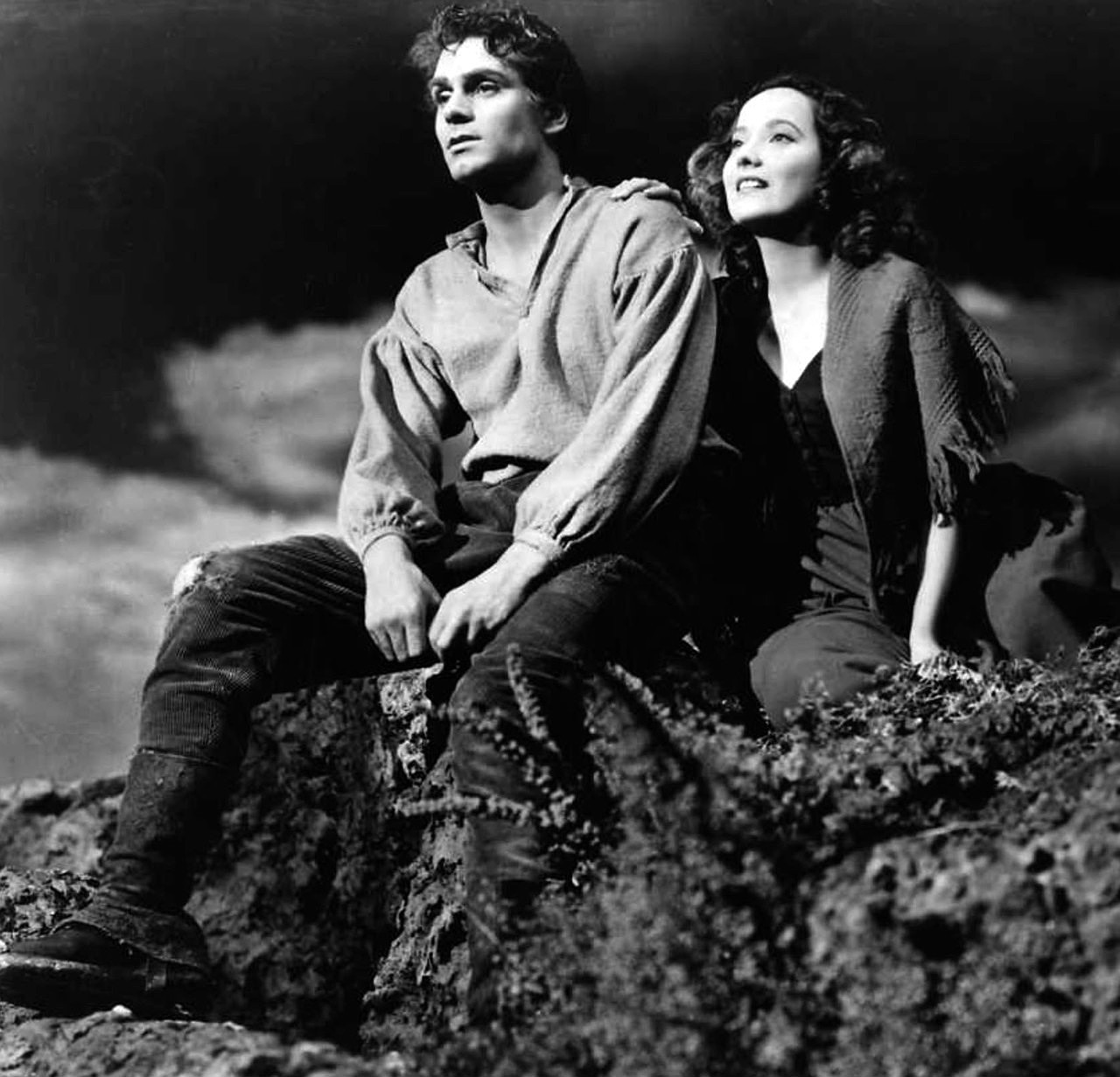
Laurence Olivier and Merle Oberon in the 1939 film Wuthering Heights

The earliest known film adaptation of Wuthering Heights was filmed in England in 1920 and was directed by A.V. Bramble. It is unknown if any prints still exist. The most famous is 1939's Wuthering Heights, starring Laurence Olivier and Merle Oberon and directed by William Wyler. This acclaimed adaptation, like many others, eliminated the second generation's story (young Cathy, Linton, and Hareton) and is rather inaccurate as a literary adaptation. It won the 1939 New York Film Critics Circle Award for Best Film and was nominated for the 1939 Academy Award for Best Picture.

Nigel Kneale's script was produced for BBC Television twice, first in 1953, starring Richard Todd as Heathcliff and Yvonne Mitchell as Cathy. Broadcast live, no recordings of the production are known to exist. The second adaptation using Kneale's script was in 1962, starring Claire Bloom as Catherine and Keith Michell as Heathcliff. This production exists in the BFI, but has been withheld from public viewing. Kneale's script was also adapted for Australian television in 1959 during a time when original drama productions in the country were rare. Broadcast live from Sydney, the performance was telerecorded, although it is unknown if this kinescope still exists.

In 1958, an adaptation aired on CBS television as part of the series DuPont Show of the Month starring Rosemary Harris as Cathy and Richard Burton as Heathcliff. The BBC produced a four-part television dramatisation in 1967 starring Ian McShane and Angela Scoular.

Les Hauts de Hurlevent is a French mini-series in six 26-minute episodes, in black and white, created and directed by Jean-Paul Carrère based on the novel, and broadcast between 1964 and 1968 on the first ORTF channel.

The 1970 film, with Timothy Dalton as Heathcliff, is the first colour version of the novel. It has gained acceptance over the years, although it was initially poorly received. Hindley's character is portrayed much more sympathetically, and his story arc is altered. It also subtly suggests that Heathcliff may be Cathy's illegitimate half-brother.

In 1978, the BBC produced a five-part TV serialisation of the book starring Ken Hutchinson, Kay Adshead and John Duttine, with music by Carl Davis; it is considered one of the most faithful adaptations of Emily Brontë's story.

The 1992 film Emily Brontë's Wuthering Heights starring Ralph Fiennes and Juliette Binoche is notable for including the oft-omitted second generation story of the children of Cathy, Hindley, and Heathcliff.

More recent film or TV adaptations include ITV's 2009 two-part drama series starring Tom Hardy, Charlotte Riley, Sarah Lancashire, and Andrew Lincoln, and the 2011 British film starring Kaya Scodelario as Catherine Earnshaw and James Howson as Heathcliff, directed by Andrea Arnold.

Adaptations that place the story in a new setting include the 1954 adaptation, retitled Abismos de pasión, directed by Spanish filmmaker Luis Buñuel and set in Catholic Mexico, in which Heathcliff and Cathy are renamed Alejandro and Catalina. In Buñuel's version, Heathcliff/Alejandro claims to have become rich by making a deal with Satan. The New York Times reviewed a re-release of this film as "an almost magical example of how an artist of genius can take someone else's classic work and shape it to fit his own temperament without really violating it," noting that the film was thoroughly Spanish and Catholic in its tone while still highly faithful to Brontë. in 1985, French director Jacques Rivette adapted the novel, moving the novel's setting to France in 1931. Yoshishige Yoshida's 1988 adaptation also has a transposed setting, this time to medieval Japan. In Yoshida's version, the Heathcliff character, Onimaru, is raised in a nearby community of priests who worship a local fire god. Filipino director Carlos Siguion-Reyna made a film adaptation titled Hihintayin Kita sa Langit (1991). The screenplay was written by Raquel Villavicencio and produced by Armida Siguion-Reyna. It starred Richard Gomez as Gabriel (Heathcliff) and Dawn Zulueta as Carmina (Catherine). It became a Filipino film classic.

In 2003, MTV produced a poorly reviewed version set in a modern California high school.

Wuthering High, a 2015 TV Movie shown on Lifetime, is set in Malibu, California.

The 1966 Hindi film Dil Diya Dard Liya is based upon the novel. The film is directed by Abdul Rashid Kardar and Dilip Kumar. The film stars Dilip Kumar, Waheeda Rehman, Pran, Rehman, Shyama and Johnny Walker. The music is by Naushad. Although it did not fare as well as other Dilip Kumar movies, it was well-received by critics.

The 2000 Hindi film Dhadkan is also based upon this novel. Directed by Dharmesh Darshan and produced by Ratan Jain, it stars Akshay Kumar, Shilpa Shetty, Sunil Shetty and Mahima Chaudhry.

In 2022, Emma Mackey starred in a biopic of Emily Brontë in Emily. The film charts Brontë's life and the inspiration she drew for writing Wuthering Heights while living in the Yorkshire countryside.

A loose adaptation directed by Emerald Fennell, Wuthering Heights, was released in 2026, starring Margot Robbie as Catherine Earnshaw and Jacob Elordi as Heathcliff.

=== Theatre ===
The novel has been adapted as operas composed by Bernard Herrmann, Carlisle Floyd, and Frédéric Chaslin (most cover only the first half of the book) and a musical by Bernard J. Taylor.

In 2021, Emma Rice directed a theatrical version that was shown online and at the Bristol Old Vic. This production was then put on at the National Theatre in 2022.

== Works inspired by Wuthering Heights ==
=== Literature ===
Mizumura Minae's A True Novel (Honkaku shosetsu) (2002) is inspired by Wuthering Heights and might be called an adaptation of the story in a post-World War II Japanese setting.

In Jane Urquhart's Changing Heaven (1990), the novel Wuthering Heights, as well as the ghost of Emily Brontë, feature as prominent roles in the narrative.

In her 2019 novel, The West Indian, Valerie Browne Lester imagines an origin story for Heathcliff in 1760s Jamaica.

K-Ming Chang's 2021 chapbook Bone House was released by Bull City Press as part of their Inch series. The collection functions as a queer Taiwanese-American retelling of Wuthering Heights, in which an unnamed narrator moves into a butcher's mansion "with a life of its own."

Canadian author Hilary Scharper's ecogothic novel Perdita (2013) was deeply influenced by Wuthering Heights, particularly in the narrative role of powerful, cruel, and desolate landscapes.

The poem "Wuthering" (2017) by Tanya Grae uses Wuthering Heights as an allegory.

Maryse Condé's Windward Heights (La migration des coeurs) (1995) is a reworking of Wuthering Heights set in Cuba and Guadeloupe at the turn of the 20th century, which Condé stated she intended as an homage to Brontë.

In 2011, a graphic novel version was published by Classical Comics. It was adapted by Scottish writer Sean Michael Wilson and hand painted by comic book veteran artist John M. Burns. This version, which stays close to the original novel, was shortlisted for the Stan Lee Excelsior Awards.

=== Music ===
Kate Bush's 1978 song "Wuthering Heights" is most likely the best-known creative work inspired by Brontë's story that is not properly an "adaptation". Bush wrote the song when she was 17 and chose it as the lead single from her debut album. It was primarily inspired by her viewing of the 1967 BBC adaptation when she was 8. The song is sung from Catherine's point of view as she pleads at Heathcliff's window to be admitted. It uses quotations from Catherine, both in the chorus ("Let me in! I'm so cold!") and the verses, with Catherine admitting she had "bad dreams in the night". Critic Sheila Whiteley wrote that the ethereal quality of the vocal resonates with Cathy's dementia, and that Bush's high register has both "childlike qualities in its purity of tone" and an "underlying eroticism in its sinuous erotic contours". Singer Pat Benatar covered the song in 1980 on her Crimes of Passion album. Brazilian heavy metal band Angra released a version of Bush's song on its debut album Angels Cry in 1993. A 2018 cover of Bush's "Wuthering Heights" by Jimmy Urine adds electropunk elements.

Wind & Wuthering (1976) by English rock band Genesis alludes to the Brontë novel not only in the album's title but also in the titles of two of its tracks, "Unquiet Slumbers for the Sleepers..." and "...In That Quiet Earth". Both titles refer to the closing lines of the novel.

Songwriter Jim Steinman said that he wrote the 1989 song "It's All Coming Back to Me Now" "while under the influence of Wuthering Heights". He said that the song was "about being enslaved and obsessed by love" and compared it to "Heathcliff digging up Cathy's corpse and dancing with it in the cold moonlight".

The 2008 song "Cath..." by indie rock band Death Cab for Cutie was inspired by Wuthering Heights.

Wuthering Heights is also the name of a Danish-Swedish power metal band.

In 2024, an indie band "Mili" released a single "Through Patches of Violet". The song features themes that Wuthering Heights explores, mainly poorly communicated love. Two voices, sung by Cassie Wei, are Heathcliff and Catherine. Originally made for a game "Limbus Company", which features Wuthering Heights's other characters and story elements.

In November 2025, Charli XCX announced her album Wuthering Heights, born out of her work on Fennell's film adaptation, released on 13 February 2026, coinciding with the release of the film - and complementing original score by Anthony Willis.

== Bibliography ==
=== Editions ===
- Bell, Ellis (1847). Wuthering Heights, A Novel (1 ed.). London: Thomas Cautley Newby – via Wikisource. "Emily Brontë as 'Ellis Bell'".
- Brontë, Emily (1976). Wuthering Heights. Oxford: Clarendon Press. ISBN 0-19-812511-9. Introduction and notes by Ian Jack, Hilda Marsden, and Inga-Stina Ewbank.

=== Journal articles ===
- Maynard, John. "The Brontës and Religion", in The Cambridge Companion to the Brontës, edited by Glen, Heather. Cambridge, England: Cambridge University Press, 2002, pp. 192–213. doi:10.1017/CCOL0521770270.010
- McInerney, Peter (1980), "Satanic conceits in Frankenstein and Wuthering Heights", Nineteenth Century Contexts, 4:1, 1–15. doi:10.1080/08905498008583178
- Rahman, Tahmina S. Wayback Machine "The Law of the Moors – A legal analysis of Wuthering Heights". UCL Jurisprudence Review. 2000
- Sangar, Charles Percy. "The Structure of Wuthering Heights", in Hogarth Essays X1X, 1926, pp. 193–208. Hogarth Press – including a detailed timeline of events in the novel, and an informed analysis of the property law underlying the narrative.
- Shumani, Gideon (March 1973). "The Unreliable Narrator in Wuthering Heights". Nineteenth-Century Fiction. 27 (4).
- Tytler, Graeme, "The Role of Religion in Wuthering Heights". Brontë Studies, 32:1, (2007) pp. 41–45. doi:10.1179/147489306x132264

=== Books ===
- Allott, Miriam (1995). The Brontës: The Critical heritage. Routledge. ISBN 978-0-415-13461-3.
- Doody, Margaret Anne (1997) [1996]. The True Story of the Novel. New Brunswick, New Jersey: Rutgers University Press. ISBN 978-0813524535.
- Drabble, Margaret, ed. (1996) [1995]. "Charlotte Brontë". The Oxford Companion to English Literature. Oxford: Oxford University Press. ISBN 0-19-866244-0.
- Gilbert, Sandra; Gubar, Susan (1979). The Madwoman in the Attic: The Woman Writer and the Nineteenth-Century Literary Imagination. Yale University Press. ISBN 978-0-300-08458-0.
- Hagan, Sandra; Wells, Juliette (2008). The Brontės in the World of the Arts. Ashgate. ISBN 978-0-7546-5752-1.
- Malham-Dembleby, John (1911). The Key to the Brontë Works. The Walter Scott Publishing.
- Manning, Susan (1992). "Introduction to". Quentin Durward. By Scott, Walter. Oxford: Oxford University Press. ISBN 978-0192826589.
- Moers, Ellen (1978) [1976]. Literary Women: The Great Writers. London: The Women's Press. ISBN 978-0385074278.
- Scott, Walter (1834). "Essay on Romance". Prose Works of Sir Walter Scott. Vol. VI. R Cadell.
