= High Sunderland Hall =

Medieval manor house

Coordinates: 53.7343°N 1.8543°W

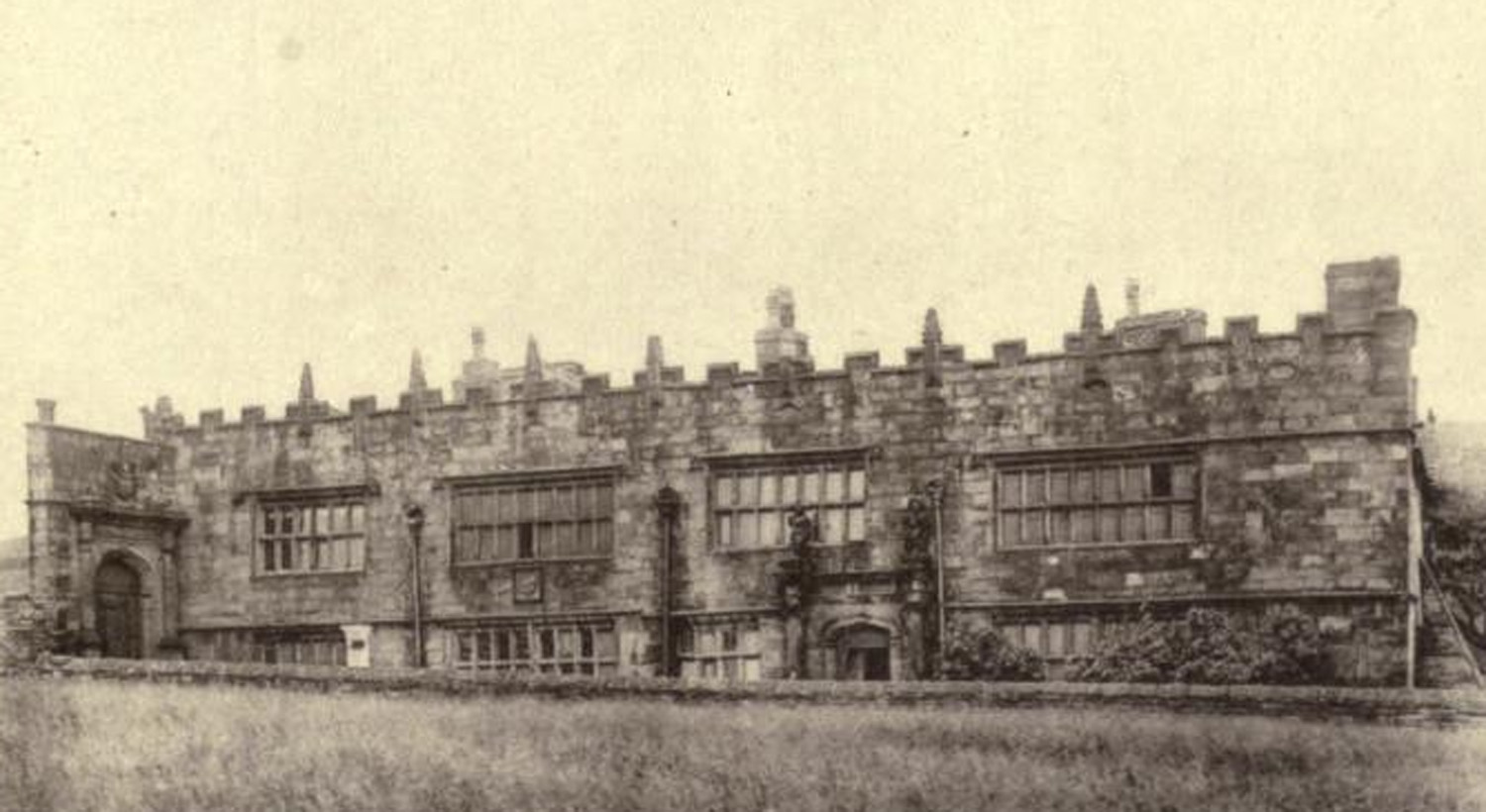
The front of High Sunderland Hall in 1913.

High Sunderland Hall was a medieval manor house clad in stone c. 1600. It was located just outside Halifax, West Yorkshire and demolished in 1951 after falling into dereliction. The house is perhaps best known for having supposedly provided Emily Brontë with her description of Wuthering Heights, the house in her eponymous novel. The building stood just a few miles from Law Hill House, Southowram, where she spent some time as a school mistress. It was home to the Sunderland family from perhaps, as early as the 12th century.

== Background ==
It has long been held that High Sunderland Hall was Emily Brontë’s main model for the external features of Wuthering Heights while Top Withens was the actual location for the house. In 1904 William Sharp in his book “Literary Geography” said.

“The Withens is on the hill-top above Haworth, and is supposed to represent the situation of Wuthering Heights. The house itself, as detailed in Emily Bronte's famous romance, is a composite picture; the interior having been suggested by Ponden Hall, near Haworth, and the exterior by High Sunderland, Law Hill, near Halifax. This, at least, is the opinion of those best acquainted with the topography of the subject"

The 1818 drawing below would have appeared very similar to the building that she viewed. Later images show the house in some disrepair.

The building was noted for its elaborate and grotesque carvings and Brontë's description of Heathcliff's wild moorland home has unmistakable echoes of the old house. In Chapter I, Brontë writes:

Before passing the threshold I paused to admire a quantity of grotesque carving lavished over the front and especially about the principal door, above which, among the wilderness of crumbling griffins and shameless little boys, I detected the date 1500 ...

The photos below show the resemblance of High Sunderland to Emily’s above description. Photo 1 is the front gate of the house and shows “a quantity of grotesque carving”. Photo 3 is the principal door and depicts even more of these grotesque figures. There are also griffins on the building – Photo 2 shows two eagle like griffins above the arch at the top of the structure.

== The Sunderland Family ==
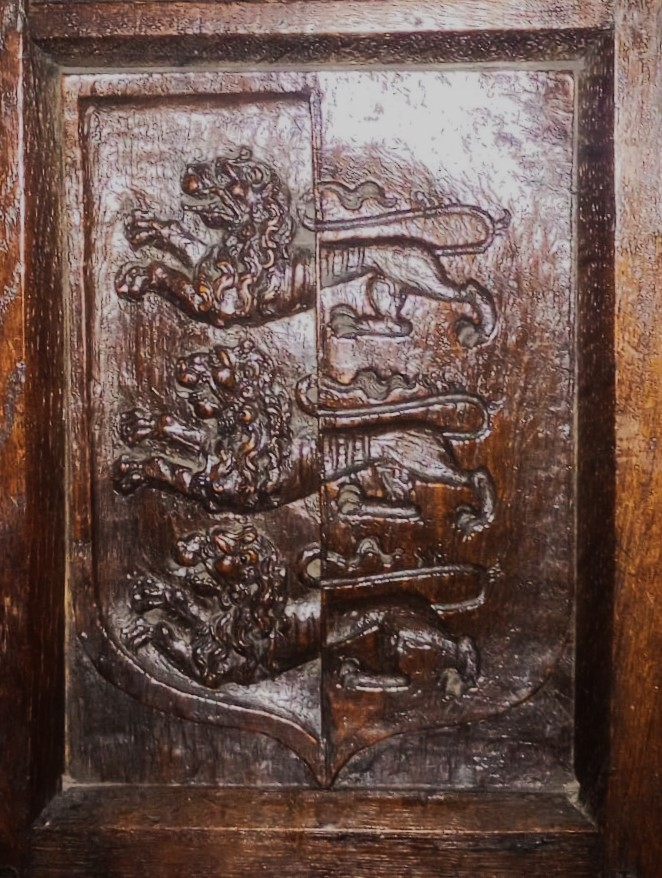
The Armorial Achievement of the Sunderlands.

High Sunderland Hall was inhabited by the eponymous Sunderland Family. The name deriving from 'asunder land' meaning land on the edge, or land set apart. The Sunderland family have been resident in West Yorkshire since around the 13th century, with a grand wooden house recorded on the site of High Sunderland Hall from at least 1274, before it was clad in stone to form the Hall familiar to Brontë.

The Sunderland family were associated, through the marriage of his sister Elizabeth Langdale, to Marmaduke Langdale, 1st Baron Langdale of Holme.

During the English Civil War, the Sunderlands' along with the Langdales' fought for the Royalist cause, with suspicious purchases of Catholic property, leading some historians to conclude that the family may have been recusants, like their openly Roman Catholic in-laws the Langdales'.

The family's time in the Hall provided the Gothic pile with a ghost, and strong material for the literary inspiration of Emily Brontë. An unnamed early Sunderland inhabitant, it is said, in a furious rage, severed the hand of his wife. From that point onward a ghostly hand was recorded at High Sunderland Hall.

...[Those sleeping in a] certain room in the hall would awake in the dead of night to hear footsteps along the corridor outside, and a fumbling at the door. Once the door had proved secure, the rattle of the handle would be followed some moments later by a tap at the window, and if a person was brave enough to look out, they would see a disembodied hand rap against the glass several times before a peal of hideous laughter was heard. It was said the hand had once belonged to an “estimable and virtuous lady” unjustly accused of infidelity by her husband, who had then cut off the appendage in a fit of jealousy....

It isn't unfeasible that the ghostly hand of High Sunderland provided some inspiration for the ghostly hand of Catherine Linton, especially considering that descended members of the Sunderland family lived in Howarth during the first half of the nineteenth century and were baptised by The Reverend Patrick Brontë.

The fortunes of the family waxed and waned, from the Elizabethan splendour of High Sunderland, to the death of one late 19th century descendant's wife in the lunatic asylum, after fifteen years of confinement for "constant praying and singing". One branch of the patrilineal descent through John Sunderland, that remained resident in West Yorkshire, terminates currently in the Parker-Sunderland line.

== Images of High Sunderland Hall ==
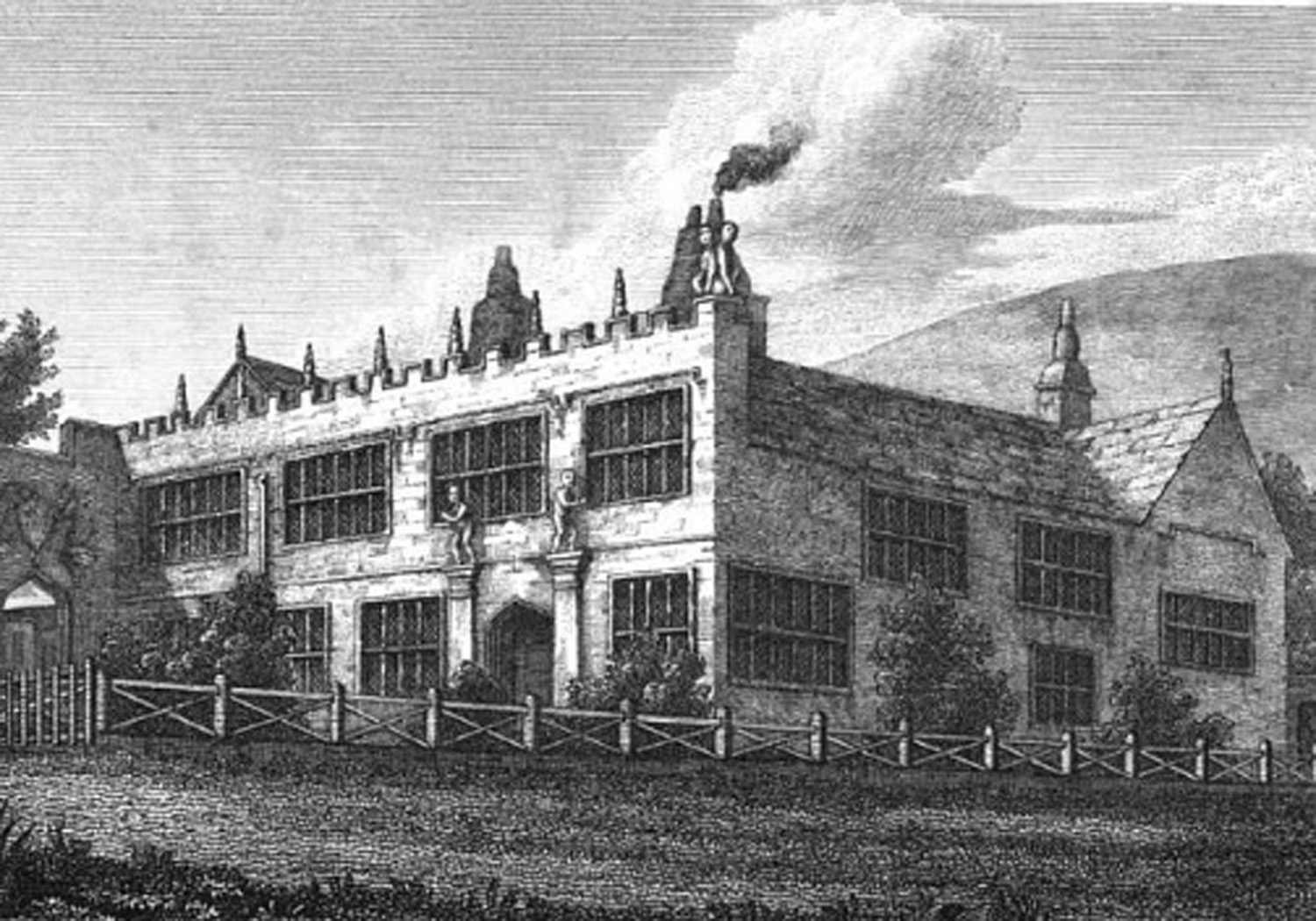
High Sunderland Hall in 1818, shortly before Emily Brontë saw the building.

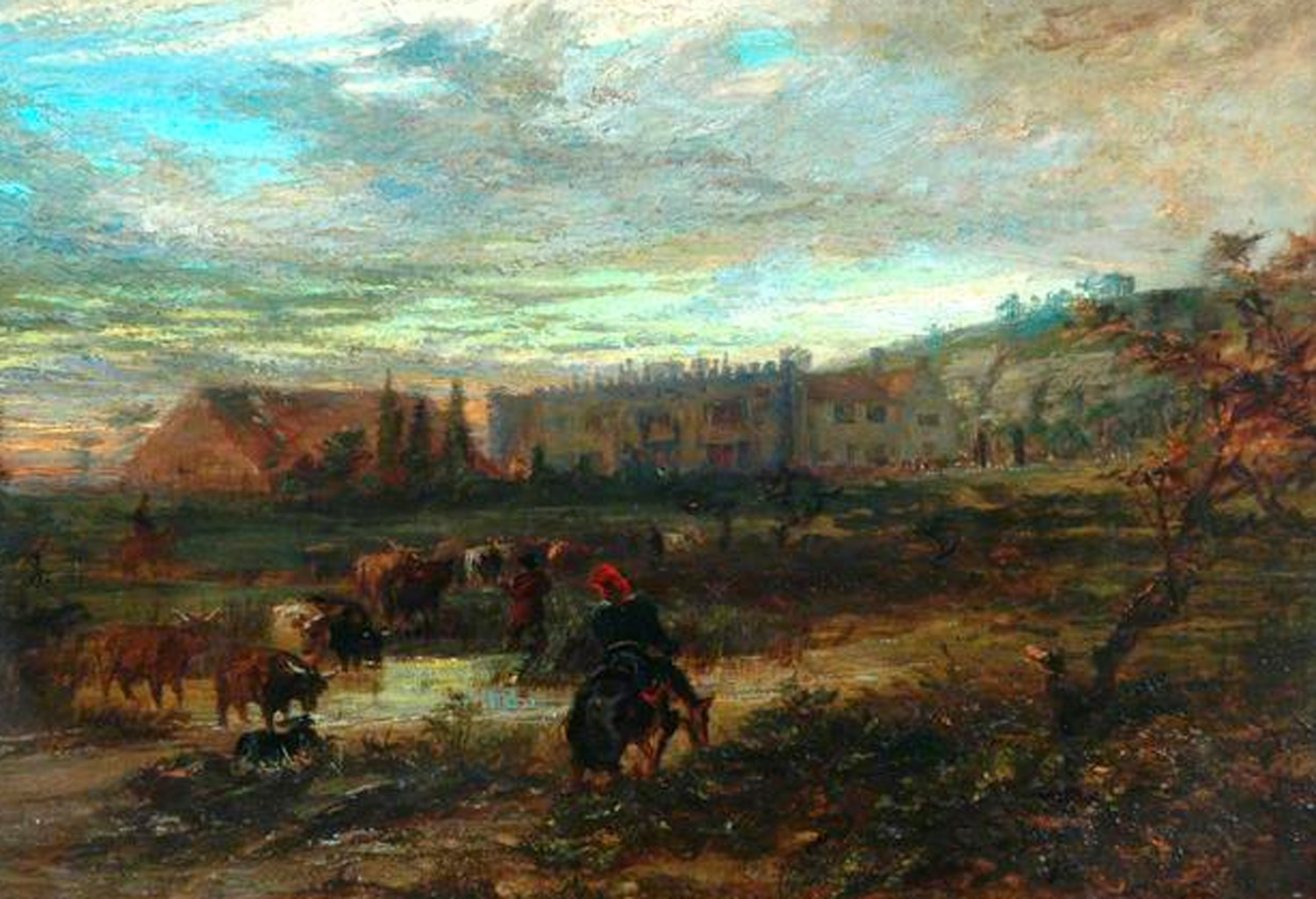
High Sunderland Hall. Painting by Duncan Campbell, 1911.

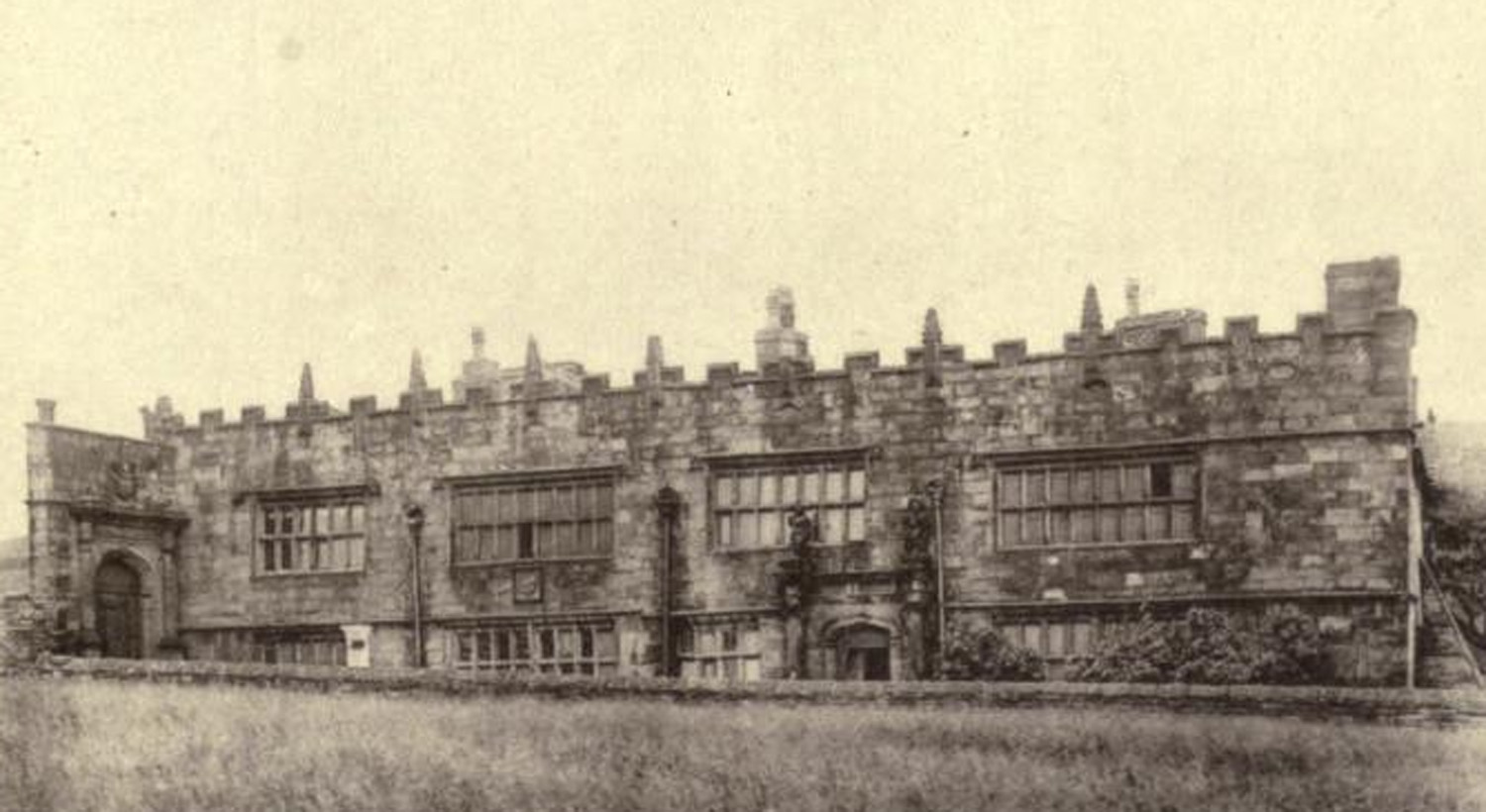
The front of High Sunderland Hall in 1913.

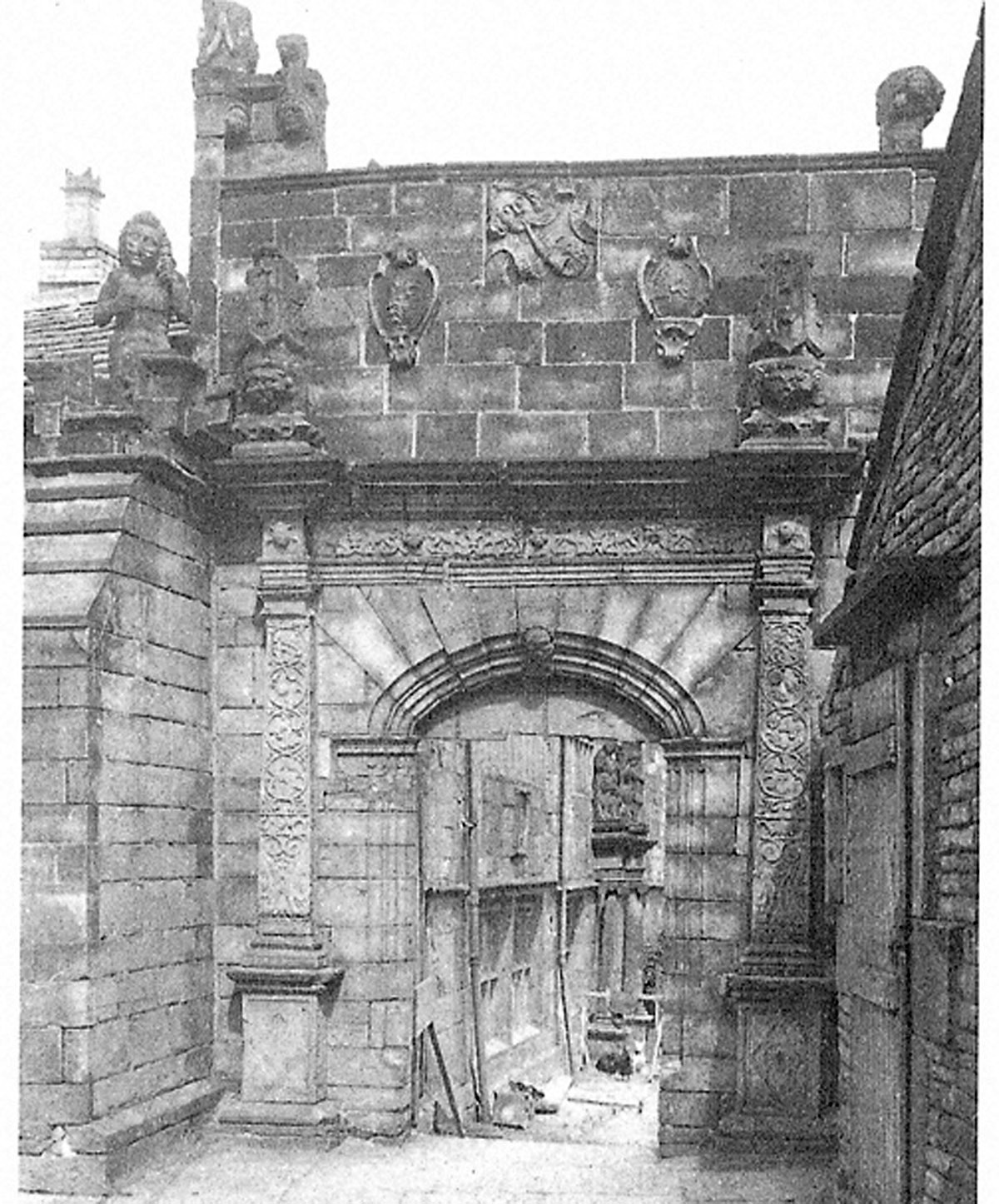
High Sunderland Hall front gateway showing some of the grotesque figures that adorned the building.

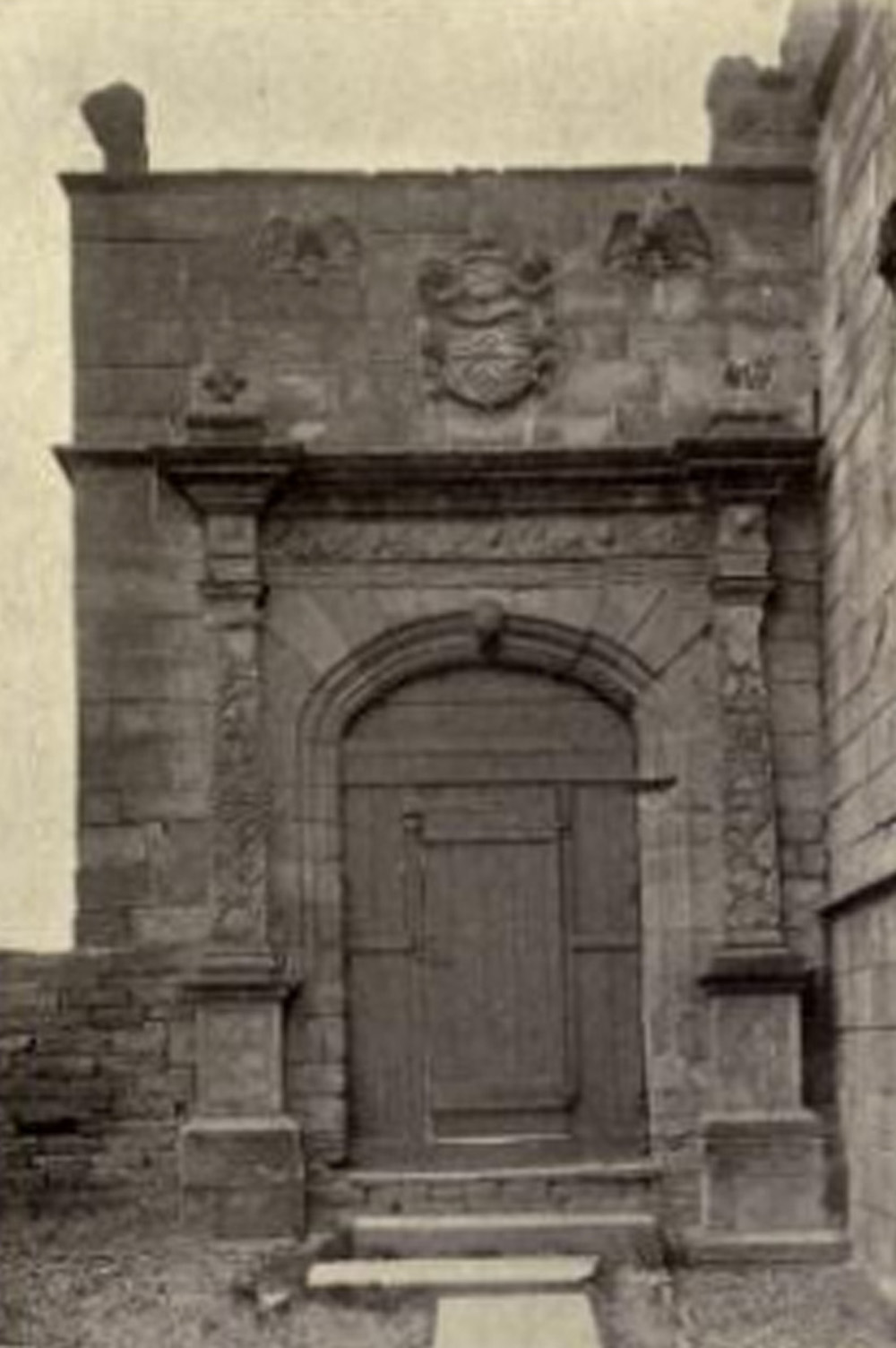
The inside of the front gateway. There are eagle like griffins at the top of the structure.

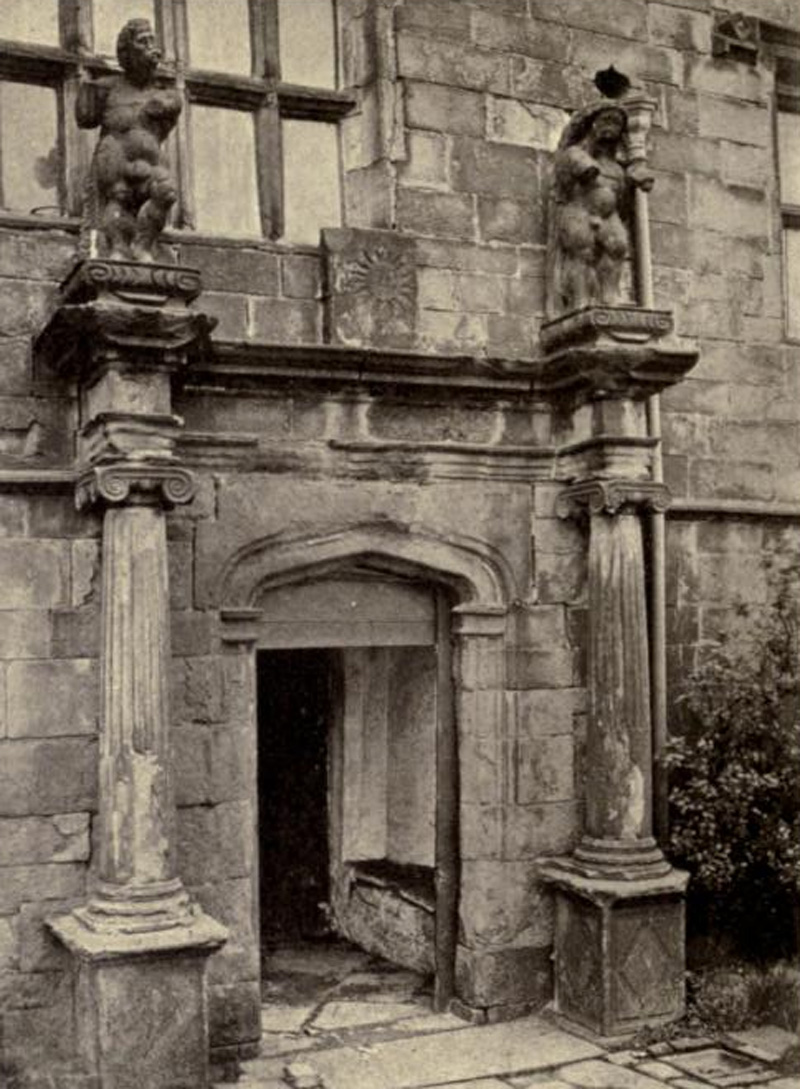
The principal door of High Sunderland Hall in 1913, showing more of the grotesque figures.

== See also ==
- Ponden Hall, reputedly the inspiration for Thrushcross Grange, the home of the Lintons in Wuthering Heights
