= Tanya Grae =

American poet (born 1970)

- Born: Sumter, South Carolina
- Education: Rollins College (BA); Bennington College (MFA); Florida State University (PhD)
- Occupations: Poet, editor, professor
- Writing career
- Notable work: Undoll
- Notable awards: Julie Suk Award; Florida Book Award
- Website: www.tanyagrae.com

Tanya Grae (born 1970) is an American poet and essayist, whose debut collection Undoll was awarded the Julie Suk Award and a Florida Book Award and was a National Poetry Series finalist. Her poems and essays have been widely published in literary journals, including Ploughshares, American Poetry Review, AGNI, Prairie Schooner, Post Road, and The Massachusetts Review. Grae was born in Sumter, South Carolina, while her father was stationed at Shaw AFB. She grew up traveling the United States as her father relocated for the military every few years and often writes about those early experiences. Her primary themes often revolve around the natural world, the American Southeast, womanhood, girlhood, matrilineal history, domesticity, and feminism.

Grae attended Rollins College and then earned her MFA at Bennington College. While completing her PhD at Florida State University, she received several awards including the Edward H. and Marie C. Kingsbury Fellowship and the 2018 John McKay Shaw Academy of American Poets Prize.

She lives in Tallahassee, Florida.

== Bibliography ==
=== Books ===
- Undoll. YesYes Books. 2019. ISBN 978-1-9369-1953-6.

In Anthology

- Best New Poets 2019. Meridian/University of Virginia Press. 2019. ISBN 978-0-9975-6233-0.
- Borderlands & Crossroads: Writing the Motherland. Meridian/University of Virginia Press. 2016. ISBN 978-1-7725-8024-2.

=== Selected poems ===
- "Oblation", Poetry Daily, 2020, republication
- "As Faithful as His Options", Missouri Review, 2019
- "In Elixir" and "Rewind", Post Road, 2017
- "Lethe", AGNI, July 2016, AAP Award 2018
- "Mating Season", AGNI, July 2016
- "Undolled", The Adroit Journal, Winter 2016

== Awards and honors ==
- 2019 Julie Suk Award, Best Poetry Book Published by a Literary Press (for Undoll)
- 2019 Florida Book Award (for Undoll)
- 2018 John McKay Shaw Academy of American Poets Prize
- 2017 National Poetry Series Finalist
- 2016 Tennessee Williams/New Orleans Literary Festival Poetry Prize
- 2010 Arden Goettling Academy of American Poets Prize
