= Adaptations of Wuthering Heights =

Adaptations of Emily Brontë's novel

This is a list of adaptations of Wuthering Heights, which was Emily Brontë's only novel. It was first published in 1847 under the pseudonym Ellis Bell, and a posthumous second edition was edited by her sister Charlotte and published in 1850.

== Film ==
- Wuthering Heights (1920), a silent film and the earliest film adaptation. It was filmed in England, directed by A.V. Bramble. It is unknown if any prints still exist.
- Wuthering Heights (1939), starring Merle Oberon as Catherine Earnshaw Linton, Laurence Olivier as Heathcliff, David Niven as Edgar Linton, Flora Robson as Ellen Dean, Donald Crisp as Dr. Kenneth, Geraldine Fitzgerald as Isabella Linton and Leo G. Carroll as the recalcitrant servant Joseph. The film was adapted by Charles MacArthur, Ben Hecht and John Huston. It was directed by William Wyler, in black and white. This adaptation, like many others, eliminated the second generation's story (young Cathy, Linton and Hareton). It won the New York Film Critics Circle Award for Best Film and was nominated for the Academy Award for Best Picture.
- Arzoo, a 1950 Indian Hindi-language romantic drama film by Shaheed Latif loosely based on the novel - starring Dilip Kumar and Kamini Kaushal in the roles of Heathcliff and Catherine respectively.
- Hulchul, a 1951 Indian Hindi-language drama film adaptation by S. K. Ojha. The film stars Dilip Kumar, Nargis and K. N. Singh in indigenized versions of Heathcliff, Catherine and Hindley.
- Abismos de Pasión (1954), a Spanish-language adaptation filmed in Mexico by Luis Buñuel, starring Jorge Mistral and Irasema Dilián, and Lilia Prado.
- Ravina (1958) directed by Rubem Biáfora
- Dil Diya Dard Liya (1966), a Bollywood movie starring Dilip Kumar (Heathcliff), Waheeda Rehman (Cathy), Pran (Hindley), Rehman (Edgar) and Shyama (Isabella). Names, locations and many plot developments were adapted to suit Indian audiences.
- Wuthering Heights (1970), directed by Robert Fuest, starring Timothy Dalton as Heathcliff and Anna Calder-Marshall as Catherine (the elder). It does not cover the whole story.
- Dehleez (1983) Pakistani Urdu-language drama film, that won seven Nigar Awards and inspired the 1985 Hindi film Oonche Log
- Hurlevent (1985), a French film adaptation by Jacques Rivette, starring Lucas Belvaux and Fabienne Babe.
- Onimaru (Arashi ga oka) (1988), a Japanese film by Yoshishige Yoshida, starring Yusaku Matsuda and Yuko Tanaka.
- Hihintayin Kita sa Langit (1991), a Filipino film by Carlos Sigiuon-Reyna, screenplay by Raquel Villavicencio, starring Richard Gomez and Dawn Zulueta.
- Emily Brontë's Wuthering Heights (1992), directed by Peter Kosminsky, starring Juliette Binoche as both Catherine Earnshaw and her daughter, and Ralph Fiennes as Heathcliff.
- The Promise (2007), a Filipino film by Mike Tuviera, screenplay by Raquel Villavicencio, starring Richard Gutierrez and Angel Locsin.
- Wuthering Heights (2011), a film version directed by Andrea Arnold, starring Kaya Scodelario as Catherine and James Howson as Heathcliff.
- Wuthering Heights (2022), a film version directed by Bryan Ferriter, starring Jet Jandreau as Catherine and Bryan Ferriter as Heathcliff.
- Wuthering Heights (2026), directed by Emerald Fennell, starring Margot Robbie and Jacob Elordi.

== Television ==
=== TV films ===
- Wuthering Heights (1948), a BBC TV adaptation directed by an uncredited George More O'Ferrall and starring Kieron Moore and Katherine Blake.
- Wuthering Heights (1950), a CBS television film starring Charlton Heston, part of the Studio One series.
- Wuthering Heights (1953), a BBC Television adaptation scripted by Nigel Kneale, directed by Rudolph Cartier and starred Richard Todd as Heathcliff and Yvonne Mitchell as Catherine. This version does not survive in the BBC archives. According to Kneale, it was made simply because Todd had turned up at the BBC one day and said that he wanted to play Heathcliff for them; Kneale was forced to write the script in only a week as the adaptation was rushed into production. Kneale's adaptation concentrates on the first half of the novel, removing the second generation of Earnshaws and Lintons entirely. It is unknown if a recording of the play existed, and if it did, it is not known to have survived.
- "Wuthering Heights" (1958), an episode of the CBS series DuPont Show of the Month, starring Rosemary Harris as Cathy, Richard Burton as Heathcliff, and Patty Duke as young Cathy. This long-lost version was found in 2019 by Jane Klain, the research manager at the Paley Center for Media. The only kinescope made of the broadcast was found among the archives of the late television historian J. Fred MacDonald that had recently been acquired by the Library of Congress. TCM aired the program for the first time since its 1958 broadcast on 6 December 2019.
- Wuthering Heights (1959), an Australian adaptation aired on ABC, using Nigel Kneale's script. Broadcast live in Sydney, a kinescope was made of the broadcast and shown in Melbourne at a later date. It is not known if the kinescope recording still exists.
- Wuthering Heights (1962), a BBC production that again used the Kneale screenplay. This was again produced by Rudolph Cartier and has been preserved in the archives. Claire Bloom played Catherine and Keith Michell played Heathcliff. This production has survived, although it is not available to the public.
- Wuthering Heights (1998), an adaptation by Neil McKay for London Weekend Television directed by David Skynner and starring Sarah Smart as Catherine (the younger), Orla Brady as the elder Catherine and Robert Cavanah as Heathcliff. Also broadcast by PBS television as part of Masterpiece Theatre.
- Wuthering Heights (2003), a modern-day film adaptation that aired on MTV. It stars Erika Christensen, Mike Vogel, and Christopher Masterson.
- Cime tempestose (2004), an Italian television adaptation directed by Fabrizio Costa, starring Alessio Boni and Anita Caprioli.
- Wuthering High School (2015), a TV film set in modern-day Malibu.

=== Series ===
- Cime tempestose (1956), an Italian four-part series starring Massimo Girotti and Anna Maria Ferrero.
- Cumbres Borrascosas (1964), a Mexican telenovela.
- Wuthering Heights (1967), a BBC miniseries starring Ian McShane as Heathcliff and Angela Scoular as Cathy.
- Wuthering Heights (1978), another BBC adaptation, directed by Peter J. Hammond and produced by Jonathan Powell, with screenplays by Hugh Leonard and David Snodin. Ken Hutchison played Heathcliff and Kay Adshead played Cathy. This adaptation covers the whole story, and has been reissued on DVD.
- Cumbres Borrascosas (1976), a Venezuelan telenovela.
- Cumbres Borrascosas (1979), a Mexican telenovela.
- Sparkhouse (2002), a BBC three-part series that shows a modern take on the story with the gender roles reversed, adapted by Sally Wainwright, directed by Robin Shepperd and starring Sarah Smart and Joseph McFadden.
- Wuthering Heights (2009), an ITV two-part series, first broadcast on PBS as part of its Masterpiece Classic programming and broadcast later in the year on ITV1 and STV, starring Tom Hardy as Heathcliff and Charlotte Riley as Catherine.
- The World Between Us (2021), a Philippine series that shows a modern take on the story.

== Radio and audio ==
- Wuthering Heights (17 October 1941), radio drama featured on Philip Morris Playhouse, starring Raymond Massey and Sylvia Sidney.
- Wuthering Heights (25 February 1946), radio drama featured on Screen Guild Players, starring Merle Oberon, Cornel Wilde and Reed Hadley.
- Wuthering Heights (1949), radio drama featured on Lux Radio Theater, starring Barbara Stanwyck and Ida Lupino.
- Wuthering Heights (1951), radio drama featured on Screen Director's Playhouse, starring Dorothy McGuire and James Mason.
- Wichrowe Wzgórza (1966), a Polish radio drama produced by Polish Radio Theatre, directed by Janusz Warnecki and starring Stanisław Zaczyk as Heathcliff and Zofia Kucówna as Cathy.
- Wuthering Heights (1977), radio drama adapted by Elizabeth Pennell for the CBS Radio Mystery Theater, featuring Paul Hecht as Heathciff, and Roberta Maxwell as Cathy.
- Wuthering Heights (1979), a spoken word album featuring Judith Anderson, Claire Bloom, James Mason, George Rose, and Gordon Gould. It was nominated for the Grammy Award for Best Spoken Word Album.
- The Ghost of Wuthering Heights (2000), a drama from the Radio Tales series, which adapted the ghost story elements of the novel for National Public Radio and XM Satellite Radio.
- Wuthering Heights (2008), an album with songs written and sung by Mark Ryan, with narration by Ray Winstone. Ryan also directed the music video for the song "Women", filmed especially for the website and featuring Jennifer Korbee, Jessica Keenan Wynn and Katie Boerk.
- Wichrowe Wzgórza (2022), a Polish audio drama produced by Audioteka, directed by Agnieszka Matysiak and starring Michał Żurawski as Heathcliff and Maria Sobocińska as Cathy.

== Opera and theatre ==
=== Opera ===
- Wuthering Heights (1951), an opera by Bernard Herrmann, which he wrote between 1943 and 1951. The libretto was by screenwriter Lucille Fletcher, who was Herrmann's wife when he started writing the opera, but was no longer his wife by the time he finished. The opera was recorded in full in London in 1966, with the composer conducting the Pro Arte Orchestra. It featured the soprano Morag Beaton in the role of Cathy, and baritone Donald Bell as Heathcliff. The recording was re-released in 1972 by Unicorn-Kanchana records, and later transferred to CD. However, the opera was not produced in an operatic venue until 1982, by Portland Opera (and even this was an abridged version that omitted 30–40 minutes of the music and changed the ending). Renée Fleming recorded the aria "I have dreamt" in 1998.
- Wuthering Heights (1958), an opera by Carlisle Floyd, which premiered at the Santa Fe Opera with Phyllis Curtin as Catherine Earnshaw and Robert Trehy as Heathcliff. A revised version of the work was performed the following year at the New York City Opera with Curtin, Patricia Neway, and Richard Cassilly.
- The all-female Japanese opera company, Takarazuka Revue, has their own interpretation of the story; the musical drama was first performed in the 1970s and the most recent production was in 1998, starring Yōka Wao.

=== Musical theatre ===
- Wuthering Heights (1994), a musical by Bernard J. Taylor. It was first recorded in 1992 as a concept album starring Lesley Garrett, Dave Willetts, Bonnie Langford and Clive Carter. It has been translated into German, Romanian and Polish.
- Heathcliff (1996), a musical starring, and commissioned by, Cliff Richard. Not well received by many older fans of the singer, it portrayed the very brutal side of the character. The album of the libretto was recorded by Richard and Olivia Newton-John.

=== Other theatre ===
- Heights (1992) by Vince Foxall, La Mama Theatre, Melbourne, Australia
- A theatrical adaptation by Michael Napier Brown was performed at the Royal Theatre in Northampton in 1994.
- A 1996 adaptation by Gillian Hiscott for theatre, toured theatres in Northern UK and the Midlands, published by Cressrelles.
- Wuthering Heights (2001), a ballet score by Claude-Michel Schönberg. This production was performed by the United Kingdom's Northern Ballet Theatre Company in September 2002. A 2-CD soundtrack was released under the First Night label in 2004.
- A theatrical adaptation conceived and directed by Emma Rice played the National Theatre in 2022, followed by an international tour.

== Graphic novel ==
- A graphic novel was published by Classical Comics in 2011. The story was adapted by Sean M. Wilson, with painted artwork by John M. Burns.

== Loose adaptations ==
- The parody sketch "The Semaphore Version of Wuthering Heights", in the episode The Spanish Inquisition (season 2, episode 2) of Monty Python's Flying Circus, September 1970.
- The gothic soap opera Dark Shadows used the story as inspiration for its final storyline, episodes 1186 to 1245, in 1971.
- Dhadkan (transl. Heartbeat), a 2000 Indian Hindi-language musical romantic drama starring Suniel Shetty, Shilpa Shetty and Akshay Kumar is a loose adaptation of the novel.
- The Promise (2007), a Filipino film starring Richard Gutiérrez and Angel Locsín which loosely remakes Hihintayin Kita sa Langit which in turn was a loose adaption of Wuthering Heights.
- Walang Hanggan (International Title: "My Eternal") (2012), a Filipino TV drama on ABS-CBN loosely based on the 1991 film Hihintayin Kita sa Langit, which itself was loosely based on Wuthering Heights.
- Limbus Company features Heathcliff as one of the 12 playable "sinners". Canto VI is a loose adaptation of various elements of Wuthering Heights.
