= Wuthering Heights (disambiguation) =

Wuthering Heights is an 1847 novel by Emily Brontë.

Wuthering Heights may also refer to:

== Film and television ==
- Wuthering Heights (1920 film), a silent film directed by A. V. Bramble and scripted by Eliot Stannard
- Wuthering Heights (1939 film), a film starring Laurence Olivier and Merle Oberon
- Wuthering Heights (1948 TV play), a BBC adaptation starring Kieron Moore and Katharine Blake
- Wuthering Heights (1953 TV play), a BBC adaptation starring Yvonne Mitchell and Richard Todd
- Wuthering Heights (1954 film) by Luis Buñuel, also known by the titles Abismos de pasión and Cumbres Borrascosas
- Wuthering Heights, a 1957 DuPont Show of the Month production starring Richard Burton as Heathcliff
- Wuthering Heights (1959 film), an Australian television play
- Wuthering Heights (1967 TV series), a British television series starring Ian McShane and Angela Scoular
- Wuthering Heights (1970 film), a film starring Timothy Dalton and Anna Calder-Marshall
- Wuthering Heights (1978 TV serial), a film starring Ken Hutchison, Kay Adshead, Pat Heywood, John Duttine
- Wuthering Heights (1985 film), a French film
- Wuthering Heights (1988 film), a Japanese film
- Emily Brontë's Wuthering Heights, 1992 film starring Juliette Binoche and Ralph Fiennes
- Wuthering Heights (1998 film), starring Robert Cavanah, Orla Brady, Crispin Bonham-Carter and Matthew Macfadyen
- Wuthering Heights (2003 film), starring Mike Vogel and Erika Christensen
- Wuthering Heights (2009 TV serial), starring Tom Hardy and Charlotte Riley
- Wuthering Heights (2011 film), starring Kaya Scodelario and James Howson
- Wuthering Heights (2026 film), starring Margot Robbie and Jacob Elordi

== Music ==
- Wuthering Heights (band), a Danish heavy metal band
- Wuthering Heights (Herrmann), a 1951 opera by Bernard Herrmann
- Wuthering Heights (Floyd), a 1958 opera by Carlisle Floyd
- "Wuthering Heights" (song), 1978, by Kate Bush
- Wuthering Heights (musical), a 1992 musical/operatic version by Bernard J. Taylor
- "Wuthering Heights", a song by Ali Project
- Wuthering Heights (album), a 2026 soundtrack album by Charli XCX for the film Wuthering Heights

== Other ==
- Wuthering Heights (fictional location), the setting of the Brontë novel
- "Wuthering Heights", a poem by Sylvia Plath
- "Wuthering Heights", a poem by Ted Hughes, in response to Plath's poem
- "Wuthering Heights", a name for Presqu'île Ronarc'h, a peninsula in the Kerguelen Islands

== See also ==
- Cumbres Borrascosas (disambiguation)
- List of Wuthering Heights adaptations
- List of Wuthering Heights references
