= List of Wuthering Heights references =

This is a list of cultural references to Wuthering Heights, which was Emily Brontë's only novel. It was first published in 1847 under the pseudonym Ellis Bell, and a posthumous 1850 second edition was edited by her sister Charlotte. For adaptations of the novel, see List of Wuthering Heights adaptations.

== In literature ==
- In Albert Camus' essay The Rebel, Heathcliff is compared to a leader of the rebel forces. Both are driven by a sort of madness: one by misguided love, the other by oppression. Camus juxtaposes the concept of Heathcliff's reaction to Catherine with the reaction of a disenchanted rebel to the ideal he once held.
- Maryse Condé's novel Windward Heights adapted Wuthering Heights to be set in Guadeloupe and Cuba.
- Sylvia Plath and Ted Hughes both wrote poems titled "Wuthering Heights."
- Anne Carson wrote a poem titled "The Glass Essay" in which are woven multiple references to Wuthering Heights and the life of Emily Brontë.
- James Stoddard's novel The False House contains numerous references to Wuthering Heights.
- In the novel H: The Story of Heathcliff's Journey Back to Wuthering Heights, Lin Haire-Sargeant tells the story of how Heathcliff discovers he is the son and heir of Edward Fairfax Rochester and Bertha Mason (Jane Eyre).
- Jasper Fforde's Thursday Next novels often mention Heathcliff as the most tragic romantic hero. In Fforde's book The Well of Lost Plots, it is revealed that all the characters of Wuthering Heights are required to attend group anger management sessions.
- In Heathcliff and the Great Hunger (1995), Terry Eagleton proposes that Heathcliff was actually a refugee from the Great Famine of Ireland.
- In the preface of his novel Le bleu du ciel, French writer Georges Bataille states that, in his view, Wuthering Heights belongs to those rare works in literature written from an inner necessity.
- Alice Hoffman's Here On Earth is a modern version of Wuthering Heights.
- In the last pages of the 2005 novel Glennkill by German writer Leonie Swann, Wuthering Heights is being read to the sheep by the shepherd's daughter, and in a way helps the main character of the novel, a sheep-detective called Miss Maple, to guess the identity of the murderer.
- In Diane Setterfield's novel The Thirteenth Tale, Wuthering Heights is frequently mentioned. The relationship between Charlie and Isabelle Angelfield parallels that of Heathcliff and Catherine in many ways.
- Michel Houellebecq's debut novel Extension du domaine de la lutte briefly mentions Wuthering Heights -- "We're a long way from Wuthering Heights"—arguing that as human relations progressively fade away, such tales of stormy passion are no longer possible.
- Cara Lockwood's Wuthering High is centred on a boarding school that is haunted by dead classic writers, Emily Brontë among them. Her novel is mentioned several times, and even her characters make appearances.
- Mizuki Nomura's second book in the Bungaku shoujo series, "Bungaku shoujo" to Uekawaku Ghost (2006), refers to and draws from Wuthering Heights.
- Japanese novelist Minae Mizumura's third work, A Real Novel, 2002, is a retelling of Wuthering Heights in postwar Japan, featuring a half-Chinese, half-Japanese Heathcliff and a problematic Nelly. It re-enacts the history of modern Japanese literature by absorbing and transforming the Western classic into the Japanese literary context.
- Layne Fargo’s 2025 novel The Favorites is loosely based on Wuthering Heights.
- Afghan novelist Khaled Hosseini's debut novel, The Kite Runner, included Wuthering Heights when Amir asks Soraya what book she is reading. Soraya replies, "It is a sad story."
- In Stephenie Meyer's novel Twilight, Bella Swan reads Wuthering Heights. In the sequel, Eclipse, several direct quotes from Wuthering Heights are used purportedly to compare Bella's relationships with Edward Cullen and Jacob Black to Catherine's relationships with Heathcliff and Edgar.
- In Kiran Desai's second novel, The Inheritance of Loss, Sai reads Wuthering Heights several times during the Ghurkha insurgency.
- In the book by Australian author Markus Zusak, I Am the Messenger, Ed, the main character, reads Wuthering Heights to the old lady in one of his tasks.
- In the manga and anime series called Aoi Hana one of the main characters plays the role of Heathcliff in a school drama festival.
- Special Topics in Calamity Physics by the American Author Marisha Pessl includes mention of the book.
- In an interview about his novel The Sound and the Fury, William Faulkner refers to the character Caddy as "my heart's darling," a phrase which Heathcliff uses to describe Catherine Earnshaw.
- In the manga series Glass Mask the main character Maya plays Catherine in a professional theatre play.
- in V.C. Andrews' novel Flowers in the Attic, Cathy Dollanganger was reading Wuthering Heights.
- In Truman Capote's novella Breakfast at Tiffany's, Holly Golightly hurts the narrator's feelings when she criticizes his work and says he should aspire to the type of subject matter found in Wuthering Heights.
- The quote of "Whatever our souls are made of..." is frequently used in the After series, by author Anna Todd.

== In music ==
- The track "Alone In The Dark Tonight" from the eleventh studio album of the British melodic hard rock band Ten entitled Albion, is based on the book and is about Heathcliff's roaming on the cemetery garden mourning his lost love.
- "Wuthering Heights" is a song by Kate Bush, which appears on her 1978 debut album, The Kick Inside, and was also released as her debut single. It has been covered by other artists, including Pat Benatar on her 1980 album Crimes of Passion; Brazilian power metal band Angra on their 1993 album Angels Cry; and Hayley Westenra on her 2003 album Pure. British punk rock band China Drum also made a cover of the song in 1995. Josh Pyke has done a cover for No Man's Woman. The Ukulele Orchestra of Great Britain have released a swing version of the song. The musical trio The Puppini Sisters have a close harmony version of the song on their debut album Betcha Bottom Dollar.
- Yoko Ono's song "You’re the One", from her 1984 duet album with John Lennon Milk and Honey compare Lennon and Ono's relationship to be viewed by society as Laurel and Hardy, but viewed by the couple as Heathcliff and Catherine Earnshaw.
- Gothic band Ali Project has released two versions of a song called "Wuthering Heights": A techno version released on the album DALI and a Classical Strings version released on the album Romance.
- In 2003, Japanese singer-songwriter Chihiro Onitsuka penned and released a B-side track on her maxi-single "Beautiful Fighter" that was titled "Arashigaoka" (嵐ヶ丘), the Japanese translation of the title "Wuthering Heights."
- In 2005, Japanese violinist Ikuko Kawai composed an instrumental piece called "Wuthering Heights." Its slightly more elaborate variation includes the subtitle "Dear Heathcliff."
- Wuthering Heights is a Danish heavy metal band.
- Death Cab for Cutie's song "Cath..." (from the album Narrow Stairs) was inspired by Wuthering Heights.
- Songwriter Jim Steinman has stated that the ballad "It's All Coming Back To Me Now" is influenced by Wuthering Heights. He compared the song to "Heathcliffe digging up Cathy's corpse and dancing with it in the cold moonlight." Steinman's song "Total Eclipse of the Heart" was also inspired by Wuthering Heights.
- Songwriter Michael Penn makes reference to Heathcliff in his song "No Myth."
- Goth rock band Diva Destruction made a reference to Heathcliff and Catherine in a song called "Heathcliff" on their album Exposing the Sickness (2002).
- In indie rock band The Hush Sound's song "A Dark Congregation," the final words of the novel are referred to in the line, "we are surrounded by all of the quiet sleepers inside the quiet earth."
- The band Alphabeat made a reference to Wuthering Heights in their song "10,000 Nights" with the line "Wuthering Heights and the stormy nights."
- The title and cover art of the 1976 album Wind & Wuthering by British progressive rock group Genesis were inspired by the novel. It also includes two instrumental pieces titled "Unquiet Slumbers For The Sleepers..." and "...In That Quiet Earth", respectively, which are the last words in the novel.
- In 2011, songwriter Daniel W. J. Mackenzie released a song titled "Take Any Form But Don't Leave Me", in reference to a line in the novel spoken by Heathcliff.
- Slowdive on their 2017 LP Slowdive include references to Wuthering Heights on "Sugar for the Pill" and "No Longer Making Time".

== In TV and movies ==
- In the 1966 horror film Island of Terror, as the Peter Cushing character and two others are approaching the mansion of Dr. Lawrence Phillips, Cushing exclaims "Good Lord! It looks like Wuthering Heights."
- In an episode of Monty Python's Flying Circus, the troupe performs a sketch of Wuthering Heights in flag semaphore.
- In an episode of Sabrina the Teenage Witch, Aunt Zelda is reading Wuthering Heights. When she finds that she's missing a chapter in the book, she uses her magic to take a short cut into the book, and she says, "Where are you, Heathcliff?" as she appears in a dark, dream-like mist scene.
- In the Sex and the City movie, Carrie mentions Wuthering Heights in her late library books, calling it a tragic love story.
- In an episode of Bones called "The Bikini in the Soup", Dr. Brennan compares the suspect to Heathcliff from Wuthering Heights, leading to his confession of the crime.
- In the 1981 film An American Werewolf in London, two American tourists walking on the moors comment on hearing howling in the background that "it could be Heathcliff looking for Catherine."
- In the 1993 film The Vanishing, Jeff Bridges' character recites the following line "Catherine... Is it not sufficient... that while you are at peace I shall writhe in the torments of hell?".
- In Season 5 episode 9 of the sitcom Friends, Phoebe Buffay and Rachel Green both enroll in a literature class. One of the books that they needed to have read is Wuthering Heights. Rachel, never having read it, gets Phoebe to give her a synopsis and uses her synopsis to describe the book, much to Phoebe's irritation.
- In the 2003 film Cold Mountain, Ada Monroe reads Wuthering Heights to Ruby.
- A theatre marquee in the 2004 film Sky Captain and the World of Tomorrow advertises the 1939 film adaptation of Wuthering Heights starring Laurence Olivier.
- In the 2004 film Confessions of a Teenage Drama Queen, Lindsay Lohan's character sees her favorite singer in New York City and remarks that "except for the garbage and cars, it's like following Heathcliff on the moors."
- In the 2009 film The Proposal, Sandra Bullock's character states that she reads Wuthering Heights every Christmas.
- Wuthering Heights is referred to in the TV show The Vampire Diaries.
- It is referred to in the TV show Dark Angel when Original Cindy refers to Alec's attitude as reminiscent of Heathcliff.
- In an episode of Frasier, Frasier Crane exclaims "You've got a vulnerable woman and an unstable man in a gothic mansion on a rainy night! The only thing missing is someone shouting 'Heathcliff!' across the moors!" upon learning that Daphne is at Niles' house.
- In the UK's Channel 4 comedy show Peep Show Series 7 Episode 3, Jeremy attempts to impress Zahra by holding a book group at the flat. The book for discussion is Wuthering Heights. However, Jeremy would rather read Mr Nice or The Book of Bunny Suicides.
- In Twilight it is mentioned as Bella Swan (Kristen Stewart) and Edward Cullen's (Robert Pattinson) favourite book.
- In a season two episode of the Disney Channel show Good Luck Charlie ("Return to Super Adventure Land"), PJ has to do a book report on Wuthering Heights for school.
- In the episode "Softball" from Malcolm in the Middle, Malcolm (Frankie Muniz) has to do a book report on Wuthering Heights. His mother Lois (Jane Kaczmarek) is shown to have a deep understanding of the story, much to Malcolm's surprise. This scene went viral following the release and mixed reception of the 2026 film adaptation.
- In an episode of Family Guy, Stewie refers to the third Brontë sister: in a cutscene the three sisters are seen complementing each other on their successes. The episode refers to the joke as a "Period, Period, Joke".
- In a season 5 episode of Mad Men, Roger queries Lane about the success of his dinner meeting with an executive from Jaguar by asking, "Hey Heathcliff, how was your date?"
- In the 19th episode from season 2 of the television show The Mentalist, Agent Cho states during a stakeout he is reading Wuthering Heights. Patrick Jane says "Let me know how it ends.", to which Cho replies "Not well!", although it is never referred to again during the series.
- The opening theme song to the anime Lupin III: The Woman Called Fujiko Mine is titled "New Wuthering Heights", and compares the eponymous heroine to Heathcliff.
- In an episode of The West Wing, Josh Lyman refers to Donna Moss', British suitor, Colin, as "Heathcliff".
- In the Mike Leigh film Career Girls, the book is used by the central characters as an oracle.
- In the 2002 Simpsons episode "Helter Shelter", The Simpson family are all living as though it were 1895. Homer says that the children are all in bed, and asks Marge if he can "wuther her heights" (a euphemism for having sex). She consents, but says that first she needs to remove her "victorian undergarments". She blows out a candle, and then we hear sounds suggesting the underwear is made of metal.
- In the 2015 anime series Yurikuma Arashi, the academy that the main characters attend is named Arashigaoka, which is the Japanese title for Wuthering Heights.
- In the 23rd episode of the 5th season of My Little Pony: Friendship is Magic, the episode starts with Fluttershy and the Furry Friends Book Club about to discuss the book Wuthering Hooves.
- In the film Big Hero 6, Fred's butler's name is "Heathcliff".
- In Season 2 episode 13 of the Netflix black comedy series A Series of Unfortunate Events, Esme Gigi Genevieve Squalor and Count Olaf celebrate their apprehension of the Baudelaires and Quagmires, in which Esme remarks that her relationship with Olaf was “just like Wuthering Heights”, going on to remark that she has never read it.
- In 2023, in the movie “Evil Dead Rise”, Teresa begins reading Emily Brontë's classic Gothic 1847 novel “Wuthering Heights” while complaining to Jessica that this party is dead and she wants to leave. And then, Jessica eerily starts reading the words from the book out loud.

== In theater and dance ==
- In the 1940 play George Washington Slept Here by Moss Hart and George S. Kaufman, Annabell Fuller jokes that the farmhouse should be renamed "Wuthering Heights".

== In fine art ==
- The artist Edna Clarke Hall (1879-1979) often returned to Wuthering Heights as a subject matter for her drawings and paintings following her troubled marriage, particularly during periods of emotional crisis.
- Commissioned by the Brontë Parsonage Museum, British artist Sam Taylor-Wood shot pictures inspired by Wuthering Heights. These photographs of the moors around Haworth, in Yorkshire, were taken within a four-mile radius of Haworth parsonage, where the three Brontë sisters were raised, wrote their famed works, and died.

== Other references ==
- Actor Heath Ledger and his sister Catherine were named after Heathcliff and Catherine.
- Former British prime minister Gordon Brown once said in an interview that those who have likened him to Heathcliff are "absolutely correct," adding that he is more like "an older Heathcliff, a wiser Heathcliff."
- Actor Johnny Depp was asked in an interview if he was romantic, and he replied "Am I a romantic? I've seen Wuthering Heights (1939) ten times. I'm a romantic."
- In the video game called Minecraft, there is an achievement (known as "advancement" on the Java Edition of the game) titled "Withering Heights." This achievement is obtained when summoning one of the boss mobs, called the Wither.
- In the video game Limbus Company, the character Heathcliff was inspired by the character of the same name in Wuthering Heights. The sixth Chapter (titled "Canto") of the game named "The Heartbreaking" is an adaptation of the story.
