= Baby Ballroom: The Championship =

British television series

Baby Ballroom: The Championship is a dancing show which aired on ITV, between 28 July and 11 August 2007. Twelve pairs of juvenile ballroom dancers, aged between six and eleven, competed for the title of Baby Ballroom Champion.

The dancers had to impress a panel of three celebrity judges: X Factor's runner up dancer and actor Ray Quinn, former child star actress singer and dancer Bonnie Langford and famous dance tutor and dancer Pierre Dulaine. Kate Thornton presented the show, where the public decided who went into the final, which was held on Saturday, 11 August. The winners of Baby Ballroom: The Championship were Kim and Josh.
