= Wuthering Heights (musical) =

Musical by Bernard J. Taylor

Wuthering Heights is Bernard J. Taylor's musical/operatic version of Emily Brontë's 1847 novel of the same name. The musical first appeared in 1992 as a studio recording featuring Lesley Garrett as Cathy, Dave Willetts as Heathcliff, Bonnie Langford as Isabella Linton and other stars of Britain's West End stage. The show has since been translated into six languages from the original English and has been extensively staged in the UK, USA, The Netherlands, Germany, Poland, Romania, Australia and New Zealand. In 2008 a production was being planned in Budapest, Hungary, where Taylor's Much Ado received its European continental premiere in 2007. Lesley Garrett has included her recording of 'I Belong To The Earth' on two of her solo albums.

The adaptation had the support of the Bronte Society at Haworth in Yorkshire, whose curator at the time, Dr. Juliet Barker, wrote: "Various other attempts at adapting Wuthering Heights for the stage have been submitted to the Bronte Society in the past but Bernard Taylor's adaptation is the first that I have really approved of and would be prepared to support."

Mark Seaward, Editor of the Bronte Society's magazine, wrote: "Wuthering Heights is an intensely dramatic work, charged with emotion; it is not surprising that many dramatists, choreographers, lyricists and composers have been drawn to recreate it for stage and screen. There have been seven major films between 1920 and 1991 and in addition there has been a ballet (1982), and opera (1967) and numerous adaptations and plays, including several for television — and not forgetting Kate Bush’s song “Wuthering Heights” which topped the charts! Bernard J. Taylor's work marks the first time that the true spirit and drama of Emily Brontë's masterpiece has been captured in a musical."

The summer, 1992 edition of Show Music Magazine, USA, reported: "Bernard J. Taylor's big, sweepingly romantic score sustains a feeling of dark passion entirely appropriate for an adaptation of Emily Bronte's novel concerning the ill-fated love between Cathy and Heathcliff."

== Musical Numbers ==
1. "Prelude" - Orchestra
2. "Wuthering Heights" - Nelly and chorus
3. "Cathy!" - Heathcliff
4. "They Say He's A Gypsy" - Cathy and chorus
5. "You Were My First Love" - Cathy and Heathcliff
6. "I See A Change In You" - Cathy and Heathcliff
7. "One Rules My Heart" - Cathy and Nelly
8. "I Have No Time For Them" - Hindley
9. "He's Gone" - Cathy
10. "Let Her Live - I Will Have My Vengeance" - Heathcliff and chorus
11. "Gypsy Waltz" - Orchestra
12. "I Belong To The Earth" - Cathy
13. "Coming Home To You" - Heathcliff
14. "The Pleasure Of Your Company" - Cathy and Edgar
15. "If Only" - Isabella
16. "Heathcliff's Lament" - Heathcliff
17. "Up Here With You" - Cathy and Heathcliff
