= To Have and to Hold (1963 film) =

1963 British film by Herbert Wise

- Theatrical release poster
- Directed by: Herbert Wise
- Screenplay by: John Sansom
- Based on: The Breaking Point by Edgar Wallace
- Produced by: Jack Greenwood
- Cinematography: James Wilson
- Edited by: Derek Holding
- Music by: Bernard Ebbinghouse
- Production company: Merton Park Studios
- Distributed by: Anglo-Amalgamated
- Release date: 25 August 1963
- Running time: 69 minutes
- Country: United Kingdom
- Language: English

To Have and to Hold is a 1963 British film directed by Herbert Wise and starring Ray Barrett, Katherine Blake and Nigel Stock. Part of the series of Edgar Wallace Mysteries films made at Merton Park Studios, it It was written by Jon Sansom based on the 1918 story The Breaking Point by Edgar Wallace.

== Plot ==
Claudia Matthews is being harassed by telephone calls from a man issuing death threats. She contacts the police who send Sergeant Fraser, who falls in love with her. Shortly afterwards a woman's body is found in Claudia's flat. It appears that Claudia has been murdered, but it turns out that things are not quite so straightforward.

== Cast ==
- Ray Barrett as Henry Fraser
- Katherine Blake as Claudia Matthews
- Nigel Stock as George Matthews
- William Hartnell as Chief Inspector Roberts
- Patricia Bredin as Lucy
- Noel Trevarthen as Blake
- Richard Clarke as Charles Wagner

== Reception ==
Kine Weekly wrote: "Excellent whodunnit, another in Anglo's Edgar Wallace series, but with fuller character drawing than usual. ...Crisply made, with well-sustained tension and a finely concealed twist ending, this film is ideal support. ... The quality that one has come to expect from Anglo's Edgar Wallace series is here enhanced by a fuller and more adult script than usual. Accepting the original promise that love will make an otherwise good policeman plan murder, the plot is well knit and the principal characters are clearly drawn. The photography is sharp and the direction pointed."
