= Wuthering Heights (2011 film) =

- UK theatrical release poster
- Directed by: Andrea Arnold
- Written by: Andrea Arnold; Olivia Hetreed
- Based on: Wuthering Heights; 1847 novel by Emily Brontë
- Produced by: Robert Bernstein; Kevin Loader; Douglas Rae
- Starring: Kaya Scodelario; James Howson; Solomon Glave; Shannon Beer; Steve Evets; Oliver Milburn; Paul Hilton; Lee Shaw; James Northcote; Amy Wren; Nichola Burley
- Cinematography: Robbie Ryan
- Edited by: Nicolas Chaudeurge
- Production companies: HanWay Films; Ecosse Films; Film4; UK Film Council; Screen Yorkshire; Goldcrest Films International
- Distributed by: Curzon Artificial Eye
- Release dates: 6 September 2011 (Venice); 11 November 2011 (United Kingdom)
- Running time: 129 minutes
- Country: United Kingdom
- Language: English
- Budget: £5 million
- Box office: $1.7 million

Wuthering Heights is a 2011 British Gothic romantic drama film directed by Andrea Arnold starring Kaya Scodelario as Catherine Earnshaw and James Howson as Heathcliff. The screenplay written by Arnold and Olivia Hetreed, is based on Emily Brontë's 1847 novel of the same name.

The plot largely follows that of the book Wuthering Heights, but concentrates on the childhood and adolescence of its two main characters of Heathcliff and Catherine. Heathcliff is bullied and "whipped like a slave", and he is played by a multiracial actor which befits the original description of Heathcliff in the book.

== Plot ==
A poor boy of unknown origins, Heathcliff, is rescued from poverty and taken in by the Earnshaw family where he develops an intense relationship with his young foster sister, Cathy. Theirs is a passionate tale of elemental love that creates a storm of vengeance.

== Cast ==
- Kaya Scodelario as Catherine Earnshaw
  - Shannon Beer as Young Catherine
- James Howson as Heathcliff
  - Solomon Glave as Young Heathcliff
- Oliver Milburn as Mr. Linton
- Nichola Burley as Isabella Linton
  - Eve Coverley as Young Isabella
- James Northcote as Edgar Linton
  - Jonny Powell as Young Edgar
- Lee Shaw as Hindley Earnshaw
- Amy Wren as Frances Earnshaw
- Steve Evets as Joseph
- Paul Hilton as Mr. Earnshaw
- Simone Jackson as Nelly Dean
- Michael Hughes as Hareton

== Production ==
Announced in April 2008, Natalie Portman was originally set to star as Cathy in a new film adaptation of the novel, but she withdrew in May. In May 2008, director John Maybury cast Michael Fassbender as Heathcliff and Abbie Cornish as Cathy. However, in May 2009, Peter Webber was announced as the new director, with Ed Westwick and Gemma Arterton attached to play Heathcliff and Cathy respectively. However, the film did not get off the ground and in January 2010, it was announced that Andrea Arnold would direct the adaptation. In April, she cast Kaya Scodelario as Catherine, a more age-appropriate choice than previous adaptations.

Due to Brontë's description of Heathcliff as a "dark-skinned gypsy in aspect" and "a little Lascar", Arnold searched for an actor from the UK's Romani community. However, the community had some doubts. The search was then expanded to Yorkshire actors aged 16 to 21 of mixed race, Indian, Pakistani, Bangladeshi or Middle Eastern descent. In November, it was reported that James Howson had been cast as Heathcliff, the first time a black actor would portray the role. Lucy Pardee was in charge of casting the children in the film (Gail Stevens cast the adults). Pardee auditioned private school children with no history of acting.

Principal photography concluded in November 2010. Filming took place in several North Yorkshire locations, including Thwaite, Cotescue Park in Coverham (as Thrushcross Grange), and Moor Close Farm in Thwaite (as Wuthering Heights) and with the production office being temporarily based in Hawes during filming.

== Promotion and release ==
The first footage of the film released was a four-shot teaser at Film4's pre-Cannes Film Festival party, with The Guardian noting that the teaser "wowed" the partygoers (including Venice Film Festival artistic director Marco Mueller who was present to scout films for his festival).

The film premiered in competition at the 2011 Venice Film Festival and appeared at the 2011 Toronto International Film Festival as a Special Presentation. It was also shown at the London Film Festival, Zurich Film Festival, Maryland Film Festival, and the Leeds Film Festival. The film was released in the UK on 11 November.

Grammy Award-nominated band Mumford & Sons recorded two songs for the film, one of which (entitled "Enemy") played over the closing credits.

Photographer Agatha A. Nitecka shot promotional material for the film including photos for the poster, DVD cover, magazines and a photo-essay. Film4 released the first promotional photo of James Howson as Heathcliff to their Twitter account the morning the Venice Film Festival line-up was announced. With the announcement that the film would play at the Toronto Film Festival, four new promotional images were released.

An exhibit of film stills and photographs taken on the set by Agatha A. Nitecka was displayed in Curzon Cinema's Renoir location and her photo-essay was available free to every customer who purchased a ticket. A video of the photo-essay was also released online.

The film was released on 5 October in the United States.

== Reception ==
=== Box office ===
The film took £156,931 on its opening weekend at the box office in the United Kingdom, placing at 16th for the weekend of 11–13 November 2011.

=== Critical response ===
The film holds a 70% fresh rating on Rotten Tomatoes, based on 113 reviews, with an average rating of 6.5/10. The website's consensus reads, "Director Andrea Arnold's gritty, naturalistic re-imagining of the Emily Bronte classic stays true to the book's spirit while utilizing an unconventional approach to explore the romantic yearning at the heart of the story." On Metacritic, the film has a weighted average score of 70 out of 100, based on 24 critics.

Andrew O'Hehir of Salon placed the film at number one on his list of the top 10 best films of 2012.

During a talk with Ira Sachs at the 2016 Tribeca Film Festival, Arnold expressed her dissatisfaction with the film: "I don't like that movie.... It was a difficult experience making it, for various reasons. I find it hard to look at it."

== Awards ==
Award	Date of ceremony	Category	Nominee(s)	Results	Ref
Alliance of Women Film Journalists	7 January 2013	Best Woman Director	Andrea Arnold	Nominated	
Black Reel Awards	7 February 2013	Best Foreign Film		Nominated	
Camerimage	3 December 2011	Bronze Frog	Robbie Ryan	Won	
Evening Standard British Film Awards	7 February 2012	London Film Museum Award for Technical Achievement	Robbie Ryan	Won	
Golden Trailer Awards	5 May 2013	Technical Categories - Best Sound Editing	Oscilloscope Laboratories; Mark Woolen & Associates	Nominated	
International Istanbul Film Festival	15 April 2012	FIPRESCI Award / International Competition	Andrea Arnold	Won	
Irish Film & Television Awards	11 February 2012	Best Director of Photography (Film / TV Drama)	Robbie Ryan	Nominated	
London Film Critics' Circle	19 January 2012	Technical Achievement	Robbie Ryan	Nominated	
Valladolid International Film Festival	29 October 2011	Best Director of Photography	Robbie Ryan	Won	
Valladolid International Film Festival	29 October 2011	Honorable Mention to Young Actors	Solomon Glave; Shannon Beer	Won	
Venice Film Festival	10 September 2011	Golden Lion	Andrea Arnold	Nominated	
Venice Film Festival	10 September 2011	Osella for Best Cinematography	Robbie Ryan	Won	
