= Wuthering Heights (1970 film) =

1970 British romantic drama film directed by Robert Fuest

- US theatrical release poster
- Directed by: Robert Fuest
- Written by: Patrick Tilley
- Based on: Wuthering Heights (1847 novel) by Emily Brontë
- Produced by: Samuel Z. Arkoff; James H. Nicholson
- Starring: Anna Calder-Marshall; Timothy Dalton; Harry Andrews; Hugh Griffith; Ian Ogilvy; Judy Cornwell
- Cinematography: John Coquillon
- Edited by: Ann Chegwidden; Reginald Mills (sup.)
- Music by: Michel Legrand
- Production company: AIP-England Ltd.
- Distributed by: Anglo-EMI Film Distributors (UK)
- Release dates: 25 December 1970 (Los Angeles); 10 June 1971 (UK)
- Running time: 104 minutes
- Country: United Kingdom
- Language: English
- Budget: $800,000
- Box office: $4.5 million (est.)

Wuthering Heights is a 1970 British period romantic drama film directed by Robert Fuest, based on the 1847 Emily Brontë novel of the same name. It stars Anna Calder-Marshall as Cathy and Timothy Dalton as Heathcliff, with supporting roles played by Harry Andrews, Pamela Brown, Hugh Griffith, Ian Ogilvy and Judy Cornwell.

The film was produced by the British branch of American International Pictures, who also distributed the film in the United States. Like the 1939 version, it depicts only the first sixteen chapters concluding with Cathy Linton's death and omits the trials of her daughter, Hindley's son and Heathcliff's son.

The film opened to mixed reviews, but was a commercial success, grossing $4.5 million from a $800,000 production budget. Michel Legrand's score earned a Best Original Score nomination at the 28th Golden Globe Awards.

== Cast ==
- Anna Calder-Marshall as Catherine Earnshaw Linton
  - Gillian Hayes as Young Catherine Earnshaw
- Timothy Dalton as Heathcliff
- Harry Andrews as Mr. Earnshaw
- Hugh Griffith as Dr. Kenneth
- Judy Cornwell as Nelly Dean
- Ian Ogilvy as Edgar Linton
- Pamela Brown as Mrs. Linton
- James Cossins as Mr. Linton
- Rosalie Crutchley as Mrs. Earnshaw
- Hilary Dwyer as Isabella Linton
- Julian Glover as Hindley Earnshaw
- Morag Hood as Frances Earnshaw
- Peter Sallis as Mr. Shielders
- Aubrey Woods as Joseph
- Dudley Foster as Mr. Green
- Keith Buckley as Hareton Earnshaw

== Comparison to source material ==
This film version differs from the book in several ways, and most of the differences involve Hindley Earnshaw (Julian Glover). First it takes a more sympathetic look at Hindley. Usually portrayed as being a cruel oppressor of Heathcliff, in this version he is persecuted by his father (Harry Andrews) and lives in Heathcliff (Timothy Dalton)'s shadow. Also in this version, Nelly Dean (Judy Cornwell), the narrator, is shown as being in love with Hindley and unable to express her feelings due to their class difference. After his wife Frances' (Morag Hood) death, Hindley goes through a hedonistic stage but finally pulls himself out of it.

At the end of the film, perhaps the most controversial of all the differences, Hindley succeeds in fatally shooting Heathcliff and remains the owner of Wuthering Heights. Heathcliff and Catherine Earnshaw (Anna Calder-Marshall)'s ghosts are then reunited. When first introducing Heathcliff, the film also suggests that Heathcliff might be Mr. Earnshaw's illegitimate son and hence Cathy's half-brother.

== Production ==
=== Development ===
The film was announced in June 1969. AIP were not traditionally associated with Gothic romance, but were inspired to make the film by the success of Romeo and Juliet (1968). A studio spokesman said, "We believe that given the modern, youthful look we plan for it, the Brontë story deserves re-telling. Louis M. Heyward was the executive in charge of the project while Meade Roberts was going to write the script. "Classics have a presold audience," said AIP president James H. Nicholson.

In August AIP announced that Curtis Harrington would direct with filming to begin in late September. However filming did not proceed and Harrington wound up making Whoever Slew Auntie Roo? for AIP instead. In February 1970 AIP announced the film as part of its slate with Robert Fuest, who had just made Just like a Woman, directing from a Pat Tilley script. The following month the two leads were announced: Timothy Dalton, best known for The Lion in Winter, and Anna Calder-Marshall, best known for Male of the Species. Fuest said "We shall show Heathcliff as a man completely fascinated by Catherine's passion, sexuality, jealousy and cruelty. And the tempestuous Catherine will be seen as a woman hypnotised by Heathcliff's violence, brutality and sadistic vengefulness." Fuest says "we are making the same story" as the 1939 film but "our version will be harder, relatively stronger, closer to the book... This is a totally unromantic story. It's a classical story about generation gap and revolt. Attitudes that existed then, exist now."

=== Filming ===
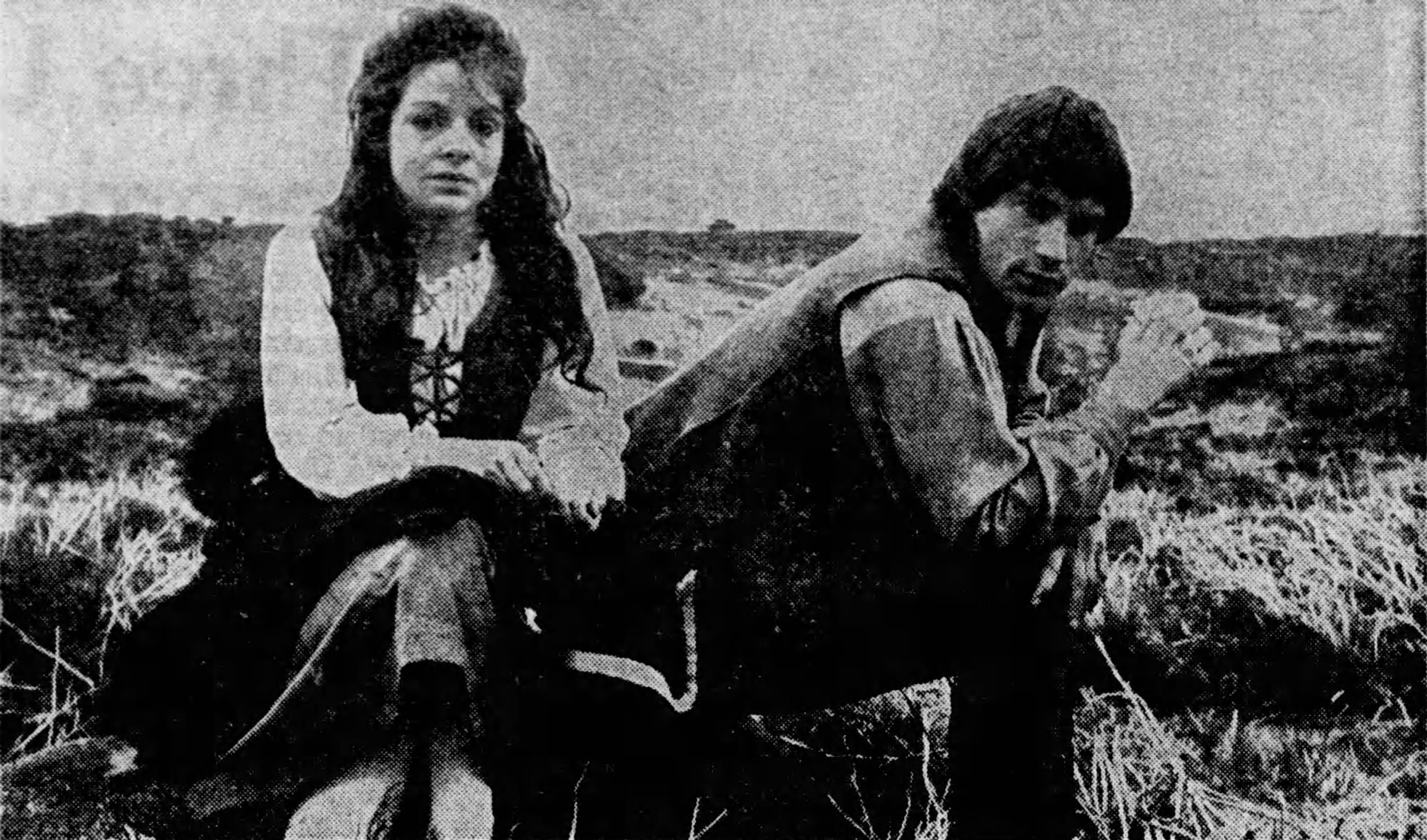
Anna Calder-Marshall and Timothy Dalton on the set of Wuthering Heights in 1970

Filming began 6 April 1970 and was shot on location in Blubberhouses, Weston Hall near Otley, and Brimham Rocks as well as Shepperton Studios. (Another film based on a Brontë sisters novel, Charlotte Brontë's Jane Eyre, started filming 18 May.) Producer Louis M. Heyward said at the time:

I'm the only American here. For the first time in 30 years Hollywood said to me, 'No big names, no huge publicity, just a good film that stands on its merits'. This is very encouraging except now we stand naked in judgement. It has to be really good with two to three million dollars invested. The last version, with Laurence Olivier as Heathcliff and Merle Oberon as Cathy, portrayed him as a regular nice guy and her as sweetness and light. That was not the truth and Hollywood now goes in for the truth. Heathcliff was a bastard and Cathy a real bitch and that's how they'll be in this film.

Filming was plagued by poor weather. The opening titles were designed by Maurice Binder.

== Release ==
AIP made a deal with the China Film Corporation to release the film in China, which AIP claimed was the first such direct deal with a US distributor.

== Reception ==
The film was given a royal premiere in Britain in front of Princess Alexandra on 9 June 1971.

=== Critical ===
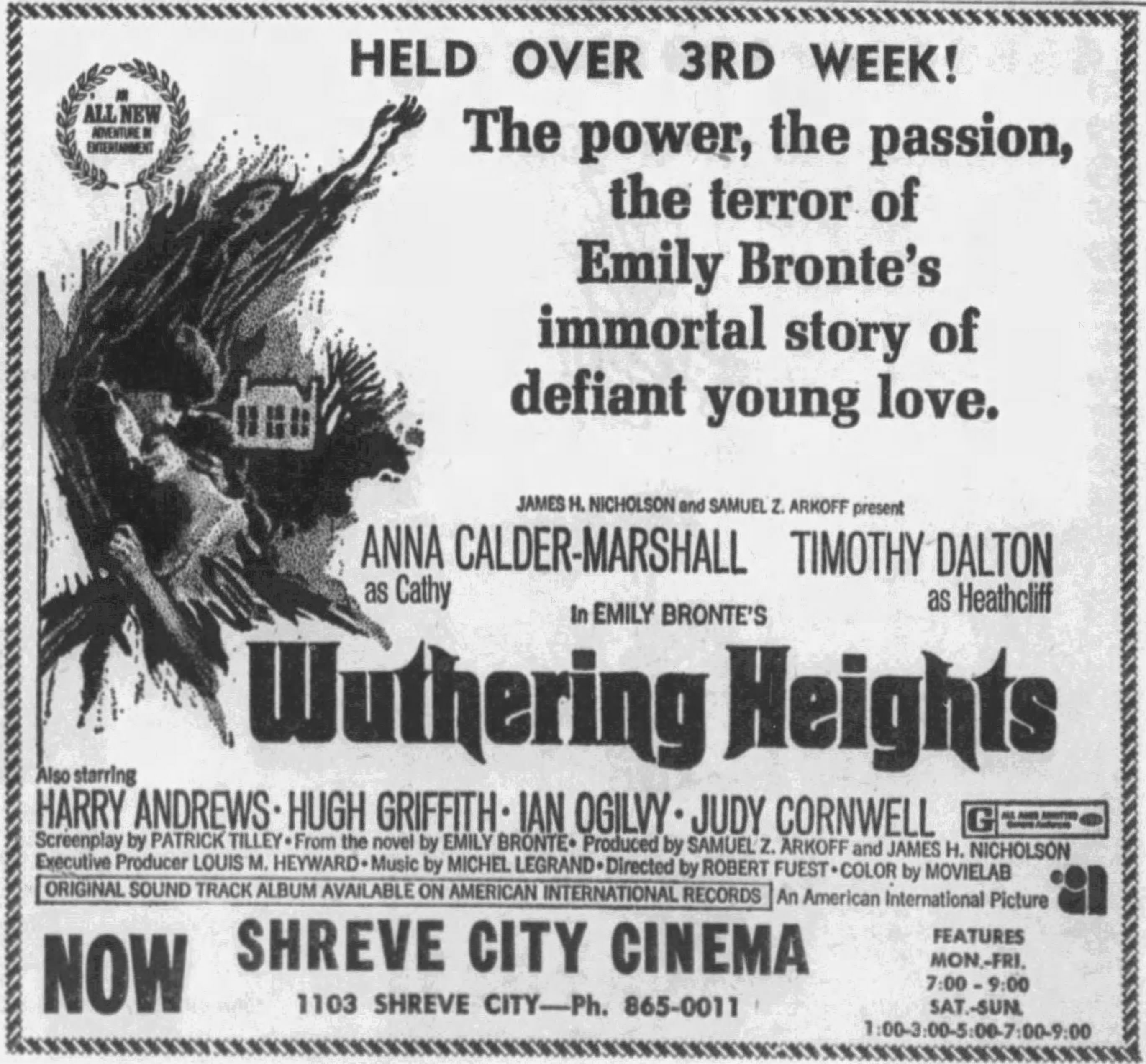
Theatre advertisement from 1971

Vincent Canby of The New York Times remarked that the film "is simply petulant when it tries to be overwrought, which may be what American International Pictures publicity people mean when they describe the film as 'youth-oriented.'" Variety called it "a competent, tasteful, frequently even lovely re-adaptation of Emily Brontë's Gothic, mystical love story. But the brooding tension, the electric passion of two lovers compelled to an inevitable tragedy is not generated." Gene Siskel of the Chicago Tribune gave the film one star out of four and wrote that the actors "are simply not equal to the demands of the script that, if not controlled, easily slips into laughable melodrama", adding that "the film has the unfortunate physical appearance of a vampire tale."

Kevin Thomas of the Los Angeles Times stated, "At the tag end of 1970, the sight of Emily Brontë's Cathy Earnshaw running all over those Yorkshire moors shouting 'Heathcliff! Heathcliff!' seems supremely silly—at least in AIP's handsome new version of Wuthering Heights ... The trouble is that it's impossible to care about any of these people, so self-indulgent are they in their romanticism. As a result, you come away from the film thinking how much healthier and honest are today's young people, the audience for which this picture presumably is intended." Gary Arnold of The Washington Post panned the film as "inane and incoherent", with "such a tenuous, sickly resemblance to the book it's based on (and whose reputation it's confiscating) that, in simple justice, the producers should be restrained from using the original title. Some of the film characters have the same names as Miss Brontë's characters, but the resemblance ceases right about there: her story, her atmosphere and her emotions are almost totally ignored, bungled or butchered." David Pirie of The Monthly Film Bulletin wrote, "At the very least, the combination of AIP and Emily Brontë promises a creative tension; but it turns out to provide only a flattened and monotonous version of her classic novel ... they have played safe in the worst possible way, reducing and telescoping the action into a meagre, spiritless soap-opera, with everyone lacking conviction and Heathcliff in particular about as demonic as a shy farm-hand."

The film holds a score of 64% on Rotten Tomatoes based on 11 reviews.

=== Box Office ===
The film was a box office success, earning rentals of $2.2 million in the US and Canada. Producer Samuel Z. Arkoff attributed this success to the fact that they related the story "to the youth of today". He contrasted this with the box office failure of Kidnapped. Arkoff also said the film "had a female audience. Which didn't mean that men didn't go. A lot of young men, of course, went with young girls. But it was a picture that young women bought."

=== Awards and nominations ===
Award	Year	Category	Nominee	Result
Golden Globe Award	1971	Best Original Score	Michel Legrand	Lost to Francis Lai for Love Story

== Proposed follow-ups ==
AIP had announced a sequel Return to Wuthering Heights but it was not made. Neither were other adaptations of classic novels mooted by the studio, including Camille, The House of Seven Gables and A Tale of Two Cities. The House of Seven Gables was to start filming in England in July 1971 from a script by Tilley who wrote Wuthering Heights. Les Miserables was to start in mid 1971 in France. Tale of Two Cities also from a script by Tilley was to film at the end of 1971. Henry VIII was another proposed AIP project. In November 1971, Fuest was to direct Seven Gables and Return to Wuthering Heights.

In April 1972 Sam Arkoff said he wanted to remake Camille by "applying it to the emotions of today", including showing "physical love". He said his version of Tale of Two Cities was discarded "because it didn't seem to relate to today." However, none of these proposed follow-ups were made.
