= Wuthering Heights (1948 TV play) =

- Genre: Period drama
- Based on: Wuthering Heights by Emily Brontë
- Written by: John Davison (dramatisation) George More O'Ferrall (adaptation) Alfred Sangster (additional dialogue)
- Directed by: George More O'Ferrall
- Starring: Kieron Moore; Katherine Blake
- Country of origin: United Kingdom
- Original language: English

Production
- Producer: George More O'Ferrall
- Running time: 90 minutes

Original release
- Network: BBC tv
- Release: 7 March 1948

Wuthering Heights is a 1948 British TV adaptation of Emily Brontë's 1847 novel Wuthering Heights directed by an uncredited George More O'Ferrall.

== Cast ==
- Kieron Moore as Heathcliff
- Katherine Blake as Catherine Earnshaw
- Christine Lindsay as Ellen Dean
- Patrick Macnee as Edgar Linton
- André Morell as Hindley Earnshaw
- Alfred Sangster (actor) as Joseph
- Annabel Maule as Isabella Linton
- Vivian Pickles as Catherine Linton
- Douglas Hurn as Hareton Earnshaw
