= Wuthering Heights (2009 TV serial) =

2009 British TV series

- Based on: Wuthering Heights by Emily Brontë
- Written by: Peter Bowker
- Directed by: Coky Giedroyc
- Starring: Tom Hardy; Charlotte Riley; Andrew Lincoln; Sarah Lancashire; Rebecca Night
- Composer: Ruth Barrett
- Country of origin: United Kingdom
- Original language: English
- No. of episodes: 2

Production
- Executive producers: Michele Buck; Damien Timmer; Hugo Heppell; Rebecca Eaton
- Producer: Radford Neville
- Cinematography: Ulf Brantås
- Editor: Mark Thornton
- Running time: 2 hours 22 minutes
- Production companies: Mammoth Screen; WGBH

Original release
- Network: ITV
- Release: 30 August – 31 August 2009

Wuthering Heights is a 2009 two-part British ITV television series adaptation of the 1847 novel Wuthering Heights by Emily Brontë. The episodes were adapted for the screen by Peter Bowker and directed by Coky Giedroyc. The programme stars Tom Hardy and Charlotte Riley in the roles of the lovers Heathcliff and Catherine Earnshaw.

The series was first broadcast in January 2009 in the US, as part of PBS's Masterpiece Classic programming. It eventually aired in the UK in two separate 90-minute instalments on consecutive nights, on 30 and 31 August 2009. It was broadcast on the terrestrial network ITV (ITV1 and UTV), and in early 2010 on STV in Scotland.

== Plot synopsis ==
For an in-depth account of the plot, See Main Article: Wuthering Heights

Based on the classic novel by Emily Brontë, Wuthering Heights is a story of love, obsession, hate and revenge. The protagonists, Cathy and Heathcliff, form a love that is dark and destructive and affects the lives of everyone around them.

== Cast and characters ==
=== Primary characters ===
- Tom Hardy as Heathcliff – Heathcliff, an orphan, is brought to Wuthering Heights as a child after Mr Earnshaw finds him living rough on the streets of Liverpool. At first he is resented by his foster siblings, Catherine and Hindley Earnshaw. Eventually Cathy comes to love him, whereas Hindley always sees him as an interloper. Heathcliff is eventually consumed by jealousy and hate when Cathy marries Edgar Linton.
- Charlotte Riley as Catherine Earnshaw – Daughter of Mr Earnshaw, Cathy at first resents Heathcliff's presence in her home but soon starts to bond with him. They eventually fall in love but their obsessive relationship is doomed from the outset. Her desire for social recognition leads her to marry Edgar Linton. From childhood to adulthood, Cathy and Heathcliff are inseparable; until she meets Edgar.
- Andrew Lincoln as Edgar Linton – Edgar is well educated, refined and wealthy, everything that Heathcliff isn't. The two men eventually come to blows over their love-rival status in a bid to win Cathy's heart.
- Kevin McNally as Mr Earnshaw – Kindly father of Catherine and Hindley, Mr Earnshaw brings home the orphan Heathcliff to Wuthering Heights, little realising the full ramifications of his good-hearted actions will plague both the boy and his daughter.
- Burn Gorman as Hindley Earnshaw – Hindley is Catherine's brother and resents Heathcliff from the start, seeing him as a rival for their father's affections. Despite Heathcliff being an outsider, Mr Earnshaw comes to love him more than Hindley and Catherine, which breeds jealousy and vengeance in the young man's heart.
- Sarah Lancashire as Nelly Dean – Partial narrator in Emily Brontë's novel, Nelly (or Ellen) is the housekeeper at Wuthering Heights and is witness to Catherine and Heathcliff's story as it unfolds.
- Rosalind Halstead as Isabella Linton – Isabella is Edgar's naive sister, who becomes close friends with Catherine when the latter is injured at Thrushcross Grange and stays with the Lintons. But when Cathy and Edgar marry, Heathcliff seduces Isabella as a way of getting his revenge.

=== Secondary characters ===
- Tom Payne as Linton Heathcliff
- Rebecca Night as Catherine Linton
- Sia Berkeley as Frances Earnshaw
- Andrew Hawley as Hareton Earnshaw
- Des McAleer as Joseph
- Declan Wheeldon as Young Heathcliff
- Alexandra Pearson as Young Cathy
- Shaughan Seymour as Dr Kenneth
- Joseph Taylor as Young Hindley

== Production ==
=== Writing ===
In approaching the novel as a 180-minute adaptation, writer Peter Bowker observed: "How do you go about adapting the greatest love story in literature? Well, firstly by acknowledging that it isn't a love story. Or at least, it is many things as well as a love story. It's a story about hate, class, revenge, sibling rivalry, loss, grief, family, violence, land and money...".

He noted that the book had previously proved "stubbornly unadaptable", the most successful version being the Hollywood picture starring Laurence Olivier, which succeeded because "with classic Hollywood ruthlessness they filleted out the Cathy/Heathcliff story and ditched the rest of the plot. It's a great film but it does the novel a disservice."

Bowker hoped to "open up some of the other themes, not least the story of how damage is passed down through generations, how revenge poisons the innocent and the guilty, how the destructive nature of hate always threatens to overwhelm the redemptive power of love" but acknowledged that "structurally, the novel is notoriously difficult".

Faced with this "complex and sometimes frustrating structure" Bowker decided to reassemble the plot of the novel in chronological order and read it again. He credits the "exercise in literary vandalism" as "a breakthrough moment in pointing to the book's adaptability". In his version, Bowker "decided to drop [the original narrator] Lockwood altogether and absorb Nelly's [partial narration] into the main drama".

Bowker also shuffled with the original organisation of the flashback episodes, instead beginning his drama "at the moment when Linton is delivered by the dying Edgar to the old Heathcliff at the Heights", rather than through the visitor Lockwood's arrival at the estate. He suggested this reshuffle would increase audience interest; as the story begins "two men hate each other and we don't know why. The Kind Man is giving his ailing nephew to the Monster and we don't know why. Start with a mystery". Bowker also found this introduction gave "the story of the younger generation the room it deserves".

=== Location ===
The Yorkshire manor house Oakwell Hall served as Wuthering Heights for the production.

== Episodes ==
No.	Title	Directed by	Written by	Original release date	Viewers (millions)
1	"Episode 1"	Coky Giedroyc	Peter Bowker	30 August 2009	3.96m
2	"Episode 2"	Coky Giedroyc	Peter Bowker	31 August 2009	3.99m

== Reception ==
The serial received a generally mixed response from critics. Metacritic denotes the average US rating as 54/100, which represents "mixed or average reviews".

In the UK, Kathryn Flett of The Observer began by asserting that "Wuthering Heights is a nightmare for a film-maker", with "too many characters to make a streamlined narrative" and "annoying" protagonists. Nevertheless she found herself "[enjoying] this edited-highlights version of the Heights, directed with flair by Coky Giedroyc". She also praised Tom Hardy in the role of Heathcliff, how he managed to convincingly make the character "thoroughly dangerous to know in all the right ways, entirely capable of making even careworn middle-aged women rend their garments, tear their hair and head for the moors". She did, however, note a dip in quality in the concluding episode, noting that "even the young Tom Hardy couldn't quite stop the second half from being a bit, like, Wuthever".
