= George More O'Ferrall =

British film and television producer (1907–1982)

George More O'Farrell
- Born: Edward George More O'Farrell; 4 July 1907; Bristol, UK
- Died: 18 March 1982 (aged 74); Ealing, London, UK
- Education: Royal Central School of Speech and Drama
- Occupations: Producer; director; actor

Edward George More O'Ferrall (4 July 1907 – 18 March 1982) was a British film and television producer and director, and actor.

== Biography ==
More O'Ferrall was born in Bristol, England, to an aristocratic Anglo-Irish family. He was educated at Beaumont College in old Windsor, and the Central School of Dramatic Art. He joined Ben Greet's Shakespeare company, within which he acted in the West End and directed plays and worked as a stage manager; he then joined the BBC in 1936 as one of the first theatre personalities to turn to television in Britain. He presented Picture Page, a magazine topical programme, both before and after the Second World War. He also produced plays, including Clive of India, collaborating with screenwriter W. P. Lipscomb.

O'Farrell directed several features in the early 1950s including The Woman for Joe.

He worked for ITV Anglia, serving as "Head of Drama", and then moved to ATV where he worked from 1964 until retiring in 1967.

O'Ferrall, worked for the British Council in London and moved to live in Spain. He died in Ealing, London on 18 March 1982, age 74.

== Awards and nominations ==
In 1948 he was awarded the first Royal Television Society (RTS) Medal for his two-part production of Hamlet.

In 1964, he was awarded the RTS Baird Medal for his outstanding contribution to television.

His film Angels One Five was nominated for the 1953 BAFTA Award for Best Film and Best British Film. The Heart of the Matter was nominated for the 1954 BAFTA Award for Best Film and Best British Film.

== Selected filmography ==
- Picture Page (1936)
- Scenes from Marigold (1936)
- Wuthering Heights (1948)
- The Holly and the Ivy (1952)
- Angels One Five (1952)
- The Heart of the Matter (1953)
- The Woman for Joe (1955)
- Three Cases of Murder (Lord Mountdrago segment) (1955)
- Theatre Parade:
  - Clive of India (TV play)
  - Alice through the Looking Glass (TV Play)
  - Wasp's Nest (TV play)
