= Katherine Blake (actress) =

British actress (1921–1991)

- Born: Illone Catherine Inglestone; 11 September 1921 or 1923; Johannesburg, South Africa
- Died: 1 March 1991 (aged 67 or 69); London, England, United Kingdom
- Occupation: Actress
- Spouses: Anthony Jacobs; David Greene; Charles Jarrott

Katherine Blake (11 September 1921 or 1923 – 1 March 1991), real name Illone Catherine Inglestone, was a British and Canadian actress, born in South Africa, who had a long career on stage, in television, and in films.

In the early 1940s, she worked on stage as Katherine Inglestone. The spelling Katharine is used by IMDb, but hardly at all elsewhere.

== Early life ==
Born in Johannesburg, Blake was the daughter of Saul Inglestone and his wife Rachael. She had a younger sister, Ruth. The family visited England in 1924, staying in St Pancras, London, but returned to South Africa. On 5 August 1938, stating her age as fifteen, Blake arrived with her mother in Southampton on the Union Castle Line's Athlone Castle, which had come from Durban via Madeira. Their names were recorded as Rae Fanny and Illonne Inglestone, and their destination as the luxurious new Cumberland Hotel, London. On 7 April 1939, Saul Inglestone, accountant, aged 45, and Ruth, aged 13, arrived in Southampton from Durban on the Windsor Castle. On 31 August 1939, Mrs R. F. Inglestone and Miss R. Inglestone, aged 13, left Southampton for Cape Town on the Union Castle ship Winchester Castle.

Blake's mother, Rachael Fanny Freeman, had been born in 1898 in Salisbury, Rhodesia, to a mother from Cologne and a father from Cardiff, and in Johannesburg in 1920 had married Saul Engelstein, originally from St George in the East, in the East End of London. He later changed his name to Inglestone.

== Career ==
In the early 1940s, as Katherine Inglestone, Blake was a member of the Amersham Playhouse repertory company. In September 1941, she was a waitress in The Devil's Advocate and in October played a ghost in A Murder Has Been Arranged. In March and April 1942, she was Frau Rothmann in Maurice Edelman's Inheritance of Earth, billed as "a drama of the Struggle for Freedom".

In February 1944, Blake returned to the Amersham Playhouse, still using her maiden name, in a production of Spring Meeting. In 1948, when reporting her first television appearance, the local newspaper noted her as "Katherine Blake whom Amersham audiences will remember as Katherine Inglestone".

In November 1946, under the new name of Blake, she played the part of Iras, a maid of honour, in a production of Antony and Cleopatra at Stratford-upon-Avon which by late December was in the West End at the Piccadilly Theatre, with Edith Evans playing Cleopatra and Godfrey Tearle Mark Antony, and the play had a good run there. In March 1947, Blake was profiled with Evans and Tearle in The Queen.

In March 1948, she appeared as Catherine Earnshaw opposite Kieron Moore as Heathcliff in an early BBC television adaptation of Wuthering Heights, with Patrick Macnee as Edgar Linton.

In 1949, Blake had another early screen appearance in Trottie True. Between 1952 and 1959, she worked in Canada and the United States and was naturalized as a Canadian citizen. In 1959, she returned to England.

Blake won the British Academy Television Award for Best Actress for her work in television in 1964. In 1969/1970 she played the character Chris Nourse in first an episode of Public Eye and then in Armchair Theatre's Wednesday's Child; one of the first lesbian love affairs to be seen on British television. Blake replaced Googie Withers as the Prison Governor in the ITV series Within These Walls in 1977, but only appeared in one season, leaving the role due to ill health.

Blake was also an occasional scriptwriter.

== Personal life ==
In June 1942, in Hampstead, as Illone C. Inglestone, Blake married firstly the actor Anthony Jacobs. In 1943, they had one daughter, Jenny, later Jenny Kastner. In June 1948, again as Illone C. Inglestone, she married secondly the actor and director David Greene, and in 1949 had a second daughter, Lindy Greene. Anthony Jacobs also married again in 1949 and had three further children, including Matthew Jacobs. In June 1959, Blake married thirdly the director Charles Jarrott. They were divorced in 1982.

Blake's mother died in Johannesburg in March 1967 and had a chevra kadisha burial there. Her father died there in April 1973 and had the same burial in the same grave. Her sister Ruth Mandell died in December 1998 and joined them in the grave.

Blake died in 1991 of a heart attack. She was estranged from both daughters at the time. Her death was registered in Camden, under the name of Katherine Ilone Jarrott, and her date of birth was recorded as 11 September 1923. Her last address was a flat in St John's Wood, Westminster NW8, and she left an estate valued for probate at £157,195.

== Selected filmography ==
- Trottie True (1949) – Ruby Rubarto (uncredited)
- Assassin for Hire (1951) – Maria Riccardi
- The Dark Light (1951) – Linda
- Hunted (1952) – Waitress
- Saturday Island (1952) – Nurse
- Hammer the Toff (1952) – Janet Lord
- Now That April's Here (1958) – Hilda Adams (segment "The Rejected One")
- Edgar Wallace Mysteries (episode: To Have and to Hold - Claudia) (1963) – (Working Title: BFI: 'Sleep Long, My Love')
- Anne of the Thousand Days (1969) – Elizabeth Boleyn

== Selected television ==
- 1948: Wuthering Heights - Catherine Earnshaw
- 1961: The Avengers – Dr. Ampara Alvarez Sandoval
- 1962: Sir Francis Drake – The Dark Lady
- 1962: Maigret – Mado
- 1963: The Saint – Rosemary Chase
- 1967: The Baron – Madame Nicharos
- 1969: Public Eye – ('My Life's my Own', episode) - Mrs. Chris Nourse (broadcast 20th. Aug., UK)
- 1971: Paul Temple – Drucilla Ardrey
- 1972: The Shadow of the Tower – Signora Cabot
- 1972: No Exit – Claire Dufort
- 1959–1973: Armchair Theatre – Sylvia Forsyth / Chris Nourse / Hilary / Marie / Carla Melini / Doris Binstead
- 1974: Crown Court – Irene Rutland - (' The Woman Least Likely ', episode)
- 1976: Within These Walls – Prison Governess — Helen Forrester
- 1980: Heartland – Aunt Lucy
- 1981: Sunday Night Thriller – Dorothy ("Blunt Instrument", Parts 1 and 2)
