= Cumbres Borrascosas =

Cumbres Borrascosas may refer to:

- The Spanish-language title of the 1847 novel Wuthering Heights by Emily Brontë
- Cumbres Borrascosas (1964 TV series), a Mexican telenovela based on the novel
- Cumbres Borrascosas (1976 TV series), a Venezuelan telenovela based on the novel
- Cumbres Borrascosas (1979 TV series), a Mexican telenovela based on the novel
