= Bonnie Langford =

English actress, singer and dancer (born 1964)

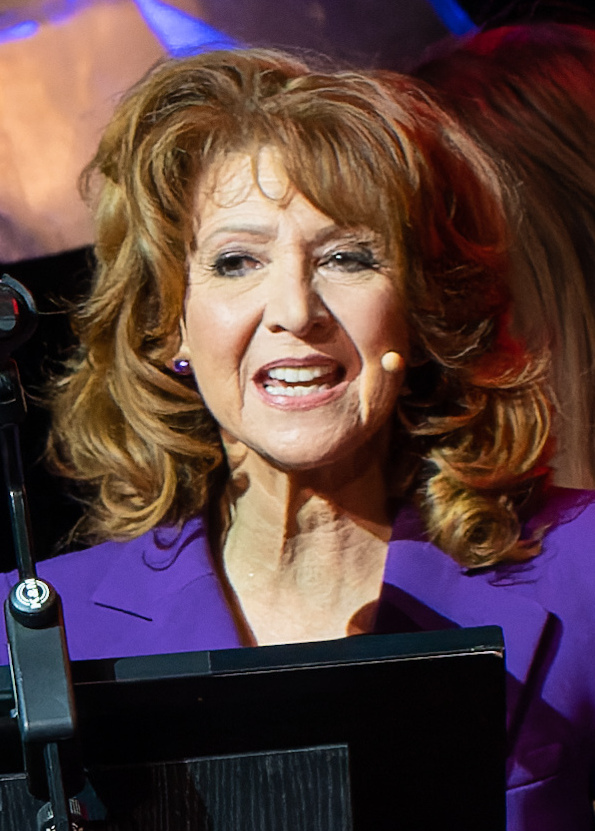
- Langford in 2023
- Born: Bonita Melody Lysette Langford; 22 July 1964 (age 62); Middlesex, England
- Education: Arts Educational Schools; St Catherine's School, Twickenham
- Alma mater: Italia Conti Academy of Theatre Arts
- Occupations: Actress; dancer; singer; TV personality
- Years active: 1970–present
- Television: Doctor Who; Dancing on Ice; EastEnders
- Spouse: Paul Grunert (m. 1995; div. 2015)
- Children: 1
- Relatives: Summer Strallen (niece); Scarlett Strallen (niece); Zizi Strallen (niece)
- Website: www.bonnielangford.co.uk

Bonita Melody Lysette Langford (born 22 July 1964) is an English actress, dancer, singer and television personality. She is often known for her TV role as Violet in Just William (1977–1978) and Melanie Bush in Doctor Who (1986–1987, 2022–2025). Langford portrayed Carmel Kazemi on the BBC soap opera EastEnders from 2015 to 2018, receiving the 2016 British Soap Award for Best Newcomer.

She has also appeared musicals in the West End and on Broadway, including Peter Pan, Cats, The Pirates of Penzance, Chicago, and Paddington: The Musical. She was a contestant on Dancing on Ice in 2006 and 2014.

== Early life and career ==
Langford was born on 22 July 1964 in Middlesex, and grew up in Surrey. She attended the Arts Educational School, St Catherine's School, Twickenham and the Italia Conti Academy stage school. She first came to public attention when, aged six years old, she won the talent show Opportunity Knocks. This led to the role of Scarlett O'Hara's daughter in the London production of Scarlett (1972), and work in the 1974 Broadway revival of Gypsy starring Angela Lansbury, in the 1976 film Bugsy Malone, the 1977 film Wombling Free, and to still greater fame playing Violet Elizabeth Bott in the 1977–78 television series Just William. During this time, she was appearing as a regular on a children's prime-time show made by Yorkshire Television called Junior Showtime, along with child stars Lena Zavaroni, Neil Reid, Perry Cree, and Glynn Poole among others.

== Career ==
=== Doctor Who ===
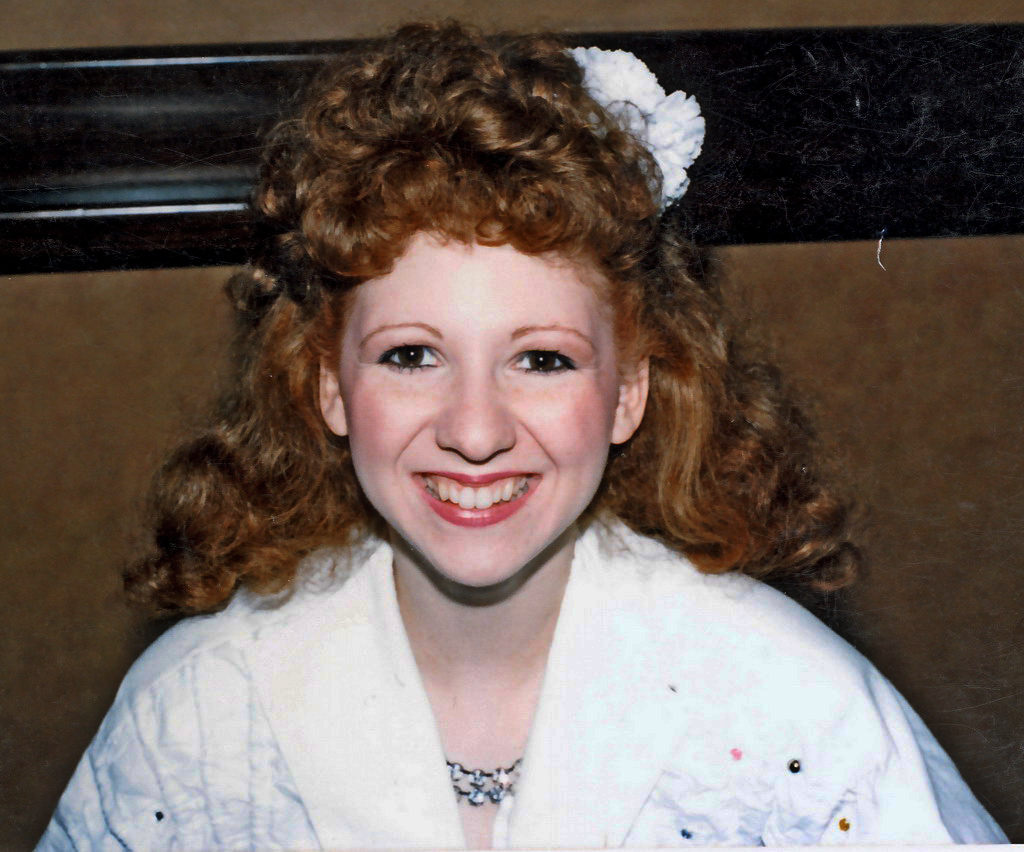
Langford at the Whovent convention in 1986

Between 1986 and 1987, Langford played the role of Mel, companion to both the Sixth and Seventh Doctors in the science fiction series Doctor Who. She returned to the role in 1993 for Dimensions in Time, a special charity Doctor Who/EastEnders crossover episode as part of the BBC's Children in Need. She has continued to reprise the role in several audio dramas alongside the Colin Baker and Sylvester McCoy Doctors and in a cameo in the episode "The Power of the Doctor". In her first appearances one of her trademarks was a penetrating scream uttered while escaping from monsters.

Langford made a surprise return to Doctor Who in 2023 for the 60th Anniversary story ‘’The Giggle’’. Also in 2023, it was announced that Langford would be returning to the series in the revival’s fourteenth series, reprising her role as a guest star, alongside Ncuti Gatwa as the Fifteenth Doctor and Millie Gibson as Ruby Sunday. She appeared in the two part finale ‘’The Legend of Ruby Sunday’’ and ‘’Empire of Death’’. The episodes were broadcast in June 2024.

She returned to the role for the Series 15 two-part finale, "Wish World" and "The Reality War".

=== Dancing ===
Langford was a featured dancer in BBC One's popular light entertainment series The Hot Shoe Show, which she co-presented with Wayne Sleep. On 23 October 2005, she performed in Children Will Listen, a 75th birthday tribute to Stephen Sondheim at the Theatre Royal, Drury Lane. She is also a panto regular; recent credits include Peter in Peter Pan at the Richmond Theatre in Richmond, London (2008–2009); and Fairy Snow in Cinderella at the Yvonne Arnaud Theatre in Guildford (2013–2014).

=== Dancing on Ice ===
In 2006, Langford was a celebrity contestant in the first series of ITV's Dancing on Ice, partnering professional figure skater Matt Evers. Their routines were characterised by the dramatic lifts and tricks they performed and were amongst the most ambitious in the competitions. Viewers saw her bang her head as she was spun on the ice during rehearsals, illustrating the danger of some of the moves they were attempting. Their appearances were also notable for the differing reception they received from the panel of judges (which consistently voted them highly, awarding them the highest total scores and the only two maximum scores from individual judges) and the voting public (who twice placed them in the bottom two pairs, forcing a "skate off" to remain in the competition). They finished in third place overall.

Langford and Evers appeared again on the programme in the one-off Champion of Champions show which followed series two. They were scored second overall by the judging panel but again the public vote was less favourable and they were amongst the four teams eliminated in the first round of the competition. Langford then toured with Torvill and Dean's Dancing on Ice: The Tour in 2007.

Langford took part in the Dancing on Ice: The Tour in April and May 2008.

In 2014, Langford returned to Dancing on Ice for the ninth and final series (10 Week run), which saw the return of contestants from previous series. This time she was partnered with professional ice skater Andrei Lipanov. She was eliminated in Week 5 after losing out to Sam Attwater and his fiancé Vicky Ogden. In February 2014, she was announced as one of eight celebrities that would be appearing in Torvill & Dean's Dancing on Ice: The Final Tour between March & April 2014.

=== Stage and television work ===
Langford's appearance on Dancing on Ice reinvigorated her career. She returned to the West End theatre in 2006 playing the role of Roxie Hart in Chicago.

In 2006 and 2007, Langford appeared in the Birmingham and Plymouth tours of Guys and Dolls playing Miss Adelaide Adams, a dance hall hostess.

In July 2007, Langford was a judge on the ITV series Baby Ballroom: The Championship.

In 2009 and 2010, she again appeared in Chicago as Roxie Hart.

Langford played the role of Roz in the first UK tour production of the Broadway musical, 9 to 5, which was launched at the Opera House, Manchester on 12 October 2012.

In 2018, she took over the leading role of Dorothy Brock in the West End revival of 42nd Street, until the show closed on 5 January 2019; a recording from the end of the 2018 run aired as part of PBS's Great Performances’ third annual “Broadway’s Best” lineup in November 2019.

In 2021, Langford appeared on The Masked Dancer, masked as Squirrel. She reached the final and was announced as the runner up on 5 June.

Langford has played the role of "Mrs. Bird" as part of the Brown family, in London West Ends "Paddington the Musical" from November 2025 to present, at the Savoy Theatre

=== EastEnders ===
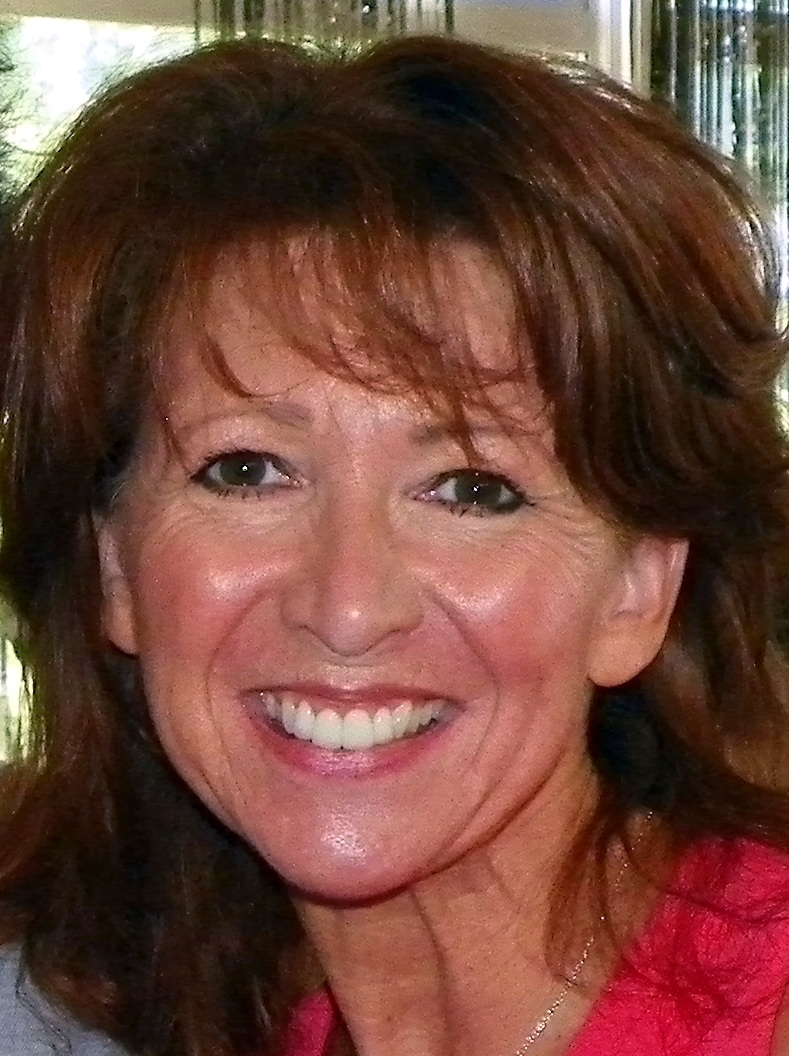
Langford at an EastEnders Meet and Greet event at BBC Elstree Centre in June 2016

On 5 April 2015, it was announced that Langford had joined long-running BBC soap opera EastEnders for a guest role, later promoted to a regular role as character Carmel Kazemi, the mother of established character, Kush Kazemi (Davood Ghadami). Carmel is described as an "overly protective" and "outspoken" mother. Commenting on the casting, Langford said: "I’m so thrilled and delighted to be part of EastEnders. I’m a great fan of the show and think the recent 30th Anniversary was sensational and shows just how good British television can be. To be part of this family is an absolute privilege."

== Personal life ==
Langford is the aunt of actresses Summer, Scarlett, Zizi, and Saskia Strallen.

In 1995, she married Paul Grunert, with whom she has one daughter. They divorced in 2015.

== Performances ==
=== Film ===
Year	Title	Role
1976	Bugsy Malone	Lena Marelli
1977	Wombling Free	Felicity Kim Frogmorton

=== Television ===
Year	Title	Role	Notes
1970	Opportunity Knocks	Herself	
1973	Junior Showtime	Tilly	Episode: "Christmas Pantomime: Babes in the Wood"
1977–1978	Just William	Violet Elizabeth Bott	17 episodes
1978	Lena and Bonnie	Herself	TV special
1982	The Morecambe & Wise Show	Singer	Episode #3.1
1982–1983, 1990	Royal Variety Performance	Herself	
1983	The Sooty Show		Episode: "The Dancer"
1983–1984	The Hot Shoe Show	Dancer	All 11 episodes
1984–1985	The Saturday Starship	Presenter	
1984	The Keith Harris Show	Herself; guest	
1985	Whose Baby?	Panelist	
1986	This Is Your Life	Herself; subject	
1986–1987, 2022–2025	Doctor Who	Mel Bush	24 episodes: Main role (Season 23, 24); Guest (2023 special, Series 14, Series 15); Cameo (2022 special)
1987	Emu's Wide World	Herself; guest	
1987	Open Air	Herself	
1987	Saturday Superstore	Herself	
1990	The Little and Large Show	Various	Episode #10.4
1991	Tonight at 8.30	Emily	Episode: "Family Album"
1992, 1997	Surprise, Surprise		
1993	Doctor Who: Dimensions in Time	Melanie Bush	Part One
1994	Showstoppers		
1999	Goodnight Sweetheart	Nancy Potter	Episode: "How I Won the War"
1999–2000	Esther	Herself; guest	2 episodes
2000	Mirrorball	Singer	
2006	Marple	Betty Johnson	Episode: "By the Pricking of My Thumbs"
2006	Dancing on Ice	Herself; contestant	Contestant; finished 3rd
2006	The Catherine Tate Show	Herself; guest	
2006	School's Out	Herself; guest	
2006	Strictly Dance Fever	Herself; guest	Advisor to contestants
2007	Hider in the House	Herself; guest	
2007	Supermarket Sweep	Herself; guest	
2007	Baby Ballroom: The Championship	Herself; judge	
2007	The Weakest Link	Herself	Music Extravaganza contestant; winner
2007	Dancing on Ice: Champion of Champions	Herself	Contestant; finished 3rd
2008	Hotel Babylon	Scarlett Senior	Episode #3.4
2008	Britannia High	Herself; guest	
2013	The Spa	Bonnie Langford	Episode: "Love Is a Losing Game"
2014	Dancing on Ice	Herself; contestant	
2014	Pointless Celebrities	Herself; contestant	
2015–2018	EastEnders	Carmel Kazemi	351 episodes
2015–2016	Children in Need	Carmel Kazemi	2 episodes
2021	The Masked Dancer	Squirrel	Contestant; finished runner-up
2026	Midsomer Murders	Nellie Barton	Episode: "The Sons of Annerby"

=== Webcasts ===
Year	Title	Role	Notes
2021	24 Carat	Mel Bush	Mini-episode as part of the release of Doctor Who: The Collection Season 24

=== Audio ===
Key
†	Denotes works that have not yet been released

Year	Title	Role	Notes
2000	The Fires of Vulcan	Mel Bush	Doctor Who audio stories
2001	The One Doctor	Mel Bush	Doctor Who audio stories
2002	Bang-Bang-a-Boom!	Mel Bush	Doctor Who audio stories
2003	Flip-Flop	Mel Bush	Doctor Who audio stories
2003	He Jests at Scars	Mel Bush	Doctor Who audio stories
2003	Zagreus	Mel Bush	Doctor Who audio stories
2005	The Juggernauts	Mel Bush	Doctor Who audio stories
2005	Catch-1782	Mel Bush	Doctor Who audio stories
2005	Unregenerate!	Mel Bush	Doctor Who audio stories
2005	Thicker than Water	Mel Bush	Doctor Who audio stories
2006	Red	Mel Bush	Doctor Who audio stories
2007	The Wishing Beast & The Vanity Box	Mel Bush	Doctor Who audio stories
2013	The Wrong Doctors	Mel Bush	Doctor Who audio stories
2013	Spaceport Fear	Mel Bush	Doctor Who audio stories
2013	The Seeds of War	Mel Bush	Doctor Who audio stories
2015	We are the Daleks	Mel Bush	Doctor Who audio stories
2015	The Warehouse	Mel Bush	Doctor Who audio stories
2015	Terror of the Sontarans	Mel Bush	Doctor Who audio stories
2015	The Last Adventure	Mel Bush	Doctor Who audio stories
2016	A Life of Crime	Mel Bush	Doctor Who audio stories
2016	Fiesta of the Damned	Mel Bush	Doctor Who audio stories
2016	Maker of Demons	Mel Bush	Doctor Who audio stories
2017	The High Price of Parking	Mel Bush	Doctor Who audio stories
2017	The Blood Furnace	Mel Bush	Doctor Who audio stories
2017	The Silurian Candidate	Mel Bush	Doctor Who audio stories
2018	Red Planets	Mel Bush	Doctor Who audio stories
2018	The Dispossessed	Mel Bush	Doctor Who audio stories
2018	The Quantum Possibility Engine	Mel Bush	Doctor Who audio stories
2022	Mind of the Hodiac	Mel Bush	Doctor Who audio stories
2022	Water Worlds	Mel Bush	Doctor Who audio stories
2022	Silver and Ice	Mel Bush	Doctor Who audio stories
2022	Purity Undreamed	Mel Bush	Doctor Who audio stories
2023	Broken Memories	Mel Bush	Doctor Who audio stories
2024	Caged	Narrator	AudioGo

=== Theatre ===
Year	Title	Role
1972	Gone with the Wind	—N/a
1973–1974	Gypsy	Baby June
1981, 1983	Cats	Rumpleteazer
1983–1985, 1989–1990	The Pirates of Penzance	Mabel & Kate
1984	42nd Street	Peggy Sawyer
1985–1986	Peter Pan	Peter Pan
1985	Me and My Girl	Sally Smith
1987	Charlie Girl	Charlie
1990	Queen Mother's 90th Birthday Gala Performance	Herself
1991	Time of My Life	Jan Cheyney
1993	Hollywood and Broadway II	Herself, Wayne Sleep, Kim Criswell
1998	Oklahoma!	Ado Annie
1998	Sweet Charity	Charity Hope Valentine
2001	Bonnie Langford Now: And Her Musicians	Herself
2002	Big Night Out at The Little Theatre	Herself
2004	Fosse	Headline Performer
2005	Children Will Listen	
2005	Pete 'N' Me	Judy
2006–2010	Chicago	Roxie Hart
2006–2007	Guys and Dolls	Miss Adelaide
2007	Torvill and Dean's Dancing on Ice: The Tour 2007	Herself
2007	Short and Curly	Herself
2008	Torvill and Dean's Dancing on Ice: The Tour 2008	Herself
2010	The Oscar Show	Herself
2010	Queen of the Stardust Ballroom	Herself
2010–2011	Brits Off Broadway	Herself
2012–2014	Spamalot	The Lady of the Lake
2012	The Night of 1,000 Voices	Herself
2014	Torvill and Dean's Dancing on Ice: The Tour 2014	Herself
2014–2015	Dirty Rotten Scoundrels (musical)	Muriel Eubanks
2015	Charles Strouse with Bonnie Langford	Herself
2015	Hey, Old Friends!	Herself
2016, 2019	An Evening with Bonnie Langford	Herself
2016	Singular Sensations	Herself
2018–2019	42nd Street	Dorothy Brock
2019–2020	9 to 5	Roz Keith
2021	The Show Must Go On!	Herself
2022	Anything Goes	Evangeline Harcourt
2023, 2025	Stephen Sondheim's Old Friends	Herself / Various
2024-2025	Les Misérables	Madame Thénardier
2025-2026	Paddington the Musical	Mrs Bird

=== Pantomime ===
Year	Title	Role
1980, 2003–2004	Dick Whittington	Dick Whittington
1984–1985, 1989–1991	Cinderella	Cinderella
1993–1994, 2000–2001	Jack and the Beanstalk	Jack
1995–1997, 2001–2002	Aladdin	Aladdin
2002–2003, 2008–2009	Peter Pan	Peter Pan
2004	Mother Goose	Prince
2005–2006	Cinderella	Prince Charming
2011–2012	Jack and the Beanstalk	Fairy Fuchsia
2013–2014	Cinderella	Fairy Snow
2021–2022	Sleeping Beauty	Lilac Fairy

== Discography ==
=== Albums ===
- CATS (Original London Cast Recording) (2002)
- Gypsy: A Musical Fable (original cast recording)
- Wuthering Heights (original cast recording of Bernard J. Taylor's musical)
- Oliver!
- Seven Brides for Seven Brothers
- The Hot Shoe Show (TV soundtrack) (1983)
- Just One Kiss / 'Til He Phones 7" (1984)
- Let's Face The Music And Dance / I Feel Good (I Got You) / Take Me To The River – Nowhere To Run (medley) / Piano In The Dark (CD single) (1996)
- Bonnie Langford Now (Selections From Her One Woman Show Live and Direct) (1999)
- Jazz at the Theatre (2003)
- Leading Ladies (2009)

== Awards and nominations ==
Year	Award	Category	Work	Result	Ref.
2006	12th National Television Awards	Most Popular TV Contender	Dancing on Ice	Nominated	
2015	Inside Soap Awards	Best Newcomer	EastEnders	Nominated	
2016	The British Soap Awards	Best Newcomer	EastEnders	Won	
2018	Inside Soap Awards	Best Actress	EastEnders	Shortlisted	
2018	I Talk Telly Awards	Best Soap Performance	EastEnders	Nominated	
2018	Digital Spy Reader Awards	Best Soap Actor (Female)	EastEnders	Fifth	
2019	24th National Television Awards	Serial Drama Performance	EastEnders	Shortlisted	
2019	Inside Soap Awards	Best Exit	EastEnders	Shortlisted	
