= Charlotte Riley =

British actress (born 1981)

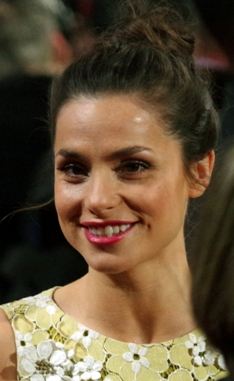
- Riley in 2014
- Born: Charlotte Frances Riley; 29 December 1981 (age 44); Grindon, County Durham, England
- Education: St Cuthbert's Society, Durham (BA); London Academy of Music and Dramatic Art
- Occupation: Actress
- Years active: 2007–present
- Spouse: Tom Hardy (m. 2014)
- Children: 2
- Relatives: Chips Hardy (father-in-law)

Charlotte Frances Riley (born 29 December 1981) is an English actress. She is known for her roles as Sarah Hurst in Easy Virtue (2008) and as Catherine Earnshaw in ITV's adaptation of Wuthering Heights (2009).

== Early life ==
Riley was born in Grindon, County Durham. She was brought up in County Durham and attended Teesside High School from the age of 9 until 18. She attended St Cuthbert's Society, Durham University from 2000 to 2003, performing with the sketch comedy group the Durham Revue and in plays and musicals and graduating with a degree in English and Linguistics; she also attended the London Academy of Music and Dramatic Art from 2005 to 2007.

== Career ==
In 2004, Riley won the Sunday Times' Playwriting Award for Shaking Cecilia, which she co-wrote with Tiffany Wood. In 2011, she played Anna in Helen Edmundson's adaptation of Anna of the Five Towns on BBC Radio 4. She appeared in Edge of Tomorrow, starring Tom Cruise and Emily Blunt. She also appeared onstage at the Royal Court Theatre production of The Priory, by Michael Wynne. She co-starred in London Has Fallen, the sequel to the 2013 film Olympus Has Fallen, where she portrayed an MI6 agent Jacqueline Marshall. She also portrayed Arabella Strange in the mini-series adaptation of Jonathan Strange & Mr Norrell. In 2018, she got a lead role in the BBC drama Press, which was cancelled after its first series. In 2019, Riley played the role of Lottie / Ghost of Christmas Present in the BBC mini-series A Christmas Carol, based on the Charles Dickens novella of the same name. She appeared in the Amazon Prime Video series The Peripheral.

== Personal life ==
In 2007, Riley and Tom Hardy met while playing fictional lovers Cathy and Heathcliff on the set of Wuthering Heights. In an interview Hardy said that although they became good friends while filming Wuthering Heights and The Take, they began a relationship only after filming the movie Warrior in 2009. Around the summer of 2010, Hardy proposed to Riley. Hardy and Riley have two children together; a son born in October 2015 and another in December 2018. Riley is also step-mother to Hardy's eldest son from a previous relationship.

== Filmography ==
| Year | Name | Role | Notes |
|---|---|---|---|
| 2007 | Grownups | Chloe | Episode: "Send" |
| 2007 | Holby City | Tanya Cusan | Episode: "Someone to Watch Over Me" |
| 2008 | Survey No. 257 | Emma | Short film |
| 2008 | Inspector George Gently | Carmel O'Shaughnessy | Episode: "The Burning Man" |
| 2008 | Easy Virtue | Sarah Hurst | |
| 2009 | Wuthering Heights | Catherine Earnshaw | Television film |
| 2009 | The Take | Maggie Summers | 4 episodes |
| 2009 | Spanish Flu: The Forgotten Fallen | Peggy Lytton | Television film |
| 2009 | Marple: The Mirror Crack'd from Side to Side | Margot Bence | Television film |
| 2010 | Foyle's War | Mandy Dean | Episode: "Killing Time" |
| 2010–2011 | DCI Banks | Lucy Payne | 3 episodes |
| 2012 | The Town | Alice | 3 episodes |
| 2012 | World Without End | Caris | 8 episodes Nominated—Saturn Award for Best Actress on Television |
| 2012 | Entity | Kate Hansen | |
| 2014 | Edge of Tomorrow | Nance | |
| 2014, 2017 | Peaky Blinders | May Fitz Carleton | Series 2 and 4 |
| 2015 | In the Heart of the Sea | Peggy Gardner Chase | |
| 2015 | Jonathan Strange & Mr Norrell | Arabella Strange | |
| 2016 | London Has Fallen | MI6 Agent Jacquelin "Jax" Marshall | |
| 2016 | Close to the Enemy | Rachel Lombard | BBC2 TV miniseries written and directed by Stephen Poliakoff |
| 2016 | Dark Heart | Juliette Wagstaffe | TV series |
| 2017 | King Charles III | Kate | Television film |
| 2018 | Swimming with Men | Swimming Coach | |
| 2018 | Press | Holly Evans | Miniseries |
| 2018 | Trust | Robina Lund | Miniseries |
| 2019 | A Christmas Carol | Lottie/Ghost of Christmas Present | Miniseries |
| 2022 | The Peripheral | Aelita | |
| 2024–Present | Trying | Kat Reid | TV Series |
| 2024–present | Smoggie Queens | Danni | TV Series |
| 2025 | Malice | Sophie | TV series |
| 2026 | Babies | Amanda | TV Series |
| 2026 | Masters of the Universe | Queen Marlena Glenn | |
| 2026 | Ted Lasso | Stage manager | 2 episodes |
