= Rubem Biáfora =

Rubem Biáfora (born 19 June 1922 in São Paulo, Brazil; died 14 January 1996 in São Paulo) was a Brazilian film director, screenwriter and producer. He also worked as a film critic for O Estado de S. Paulo.

He wrote and directed Ravina (1958), a Brazilian adaptation of Wuthering Heights, starring Eliane Lage and Mário Sérgio.

His short film Mário Gruber won a first prize.
