= Wuthering Heights (fictional location) =

Fictional location from the book of the same name

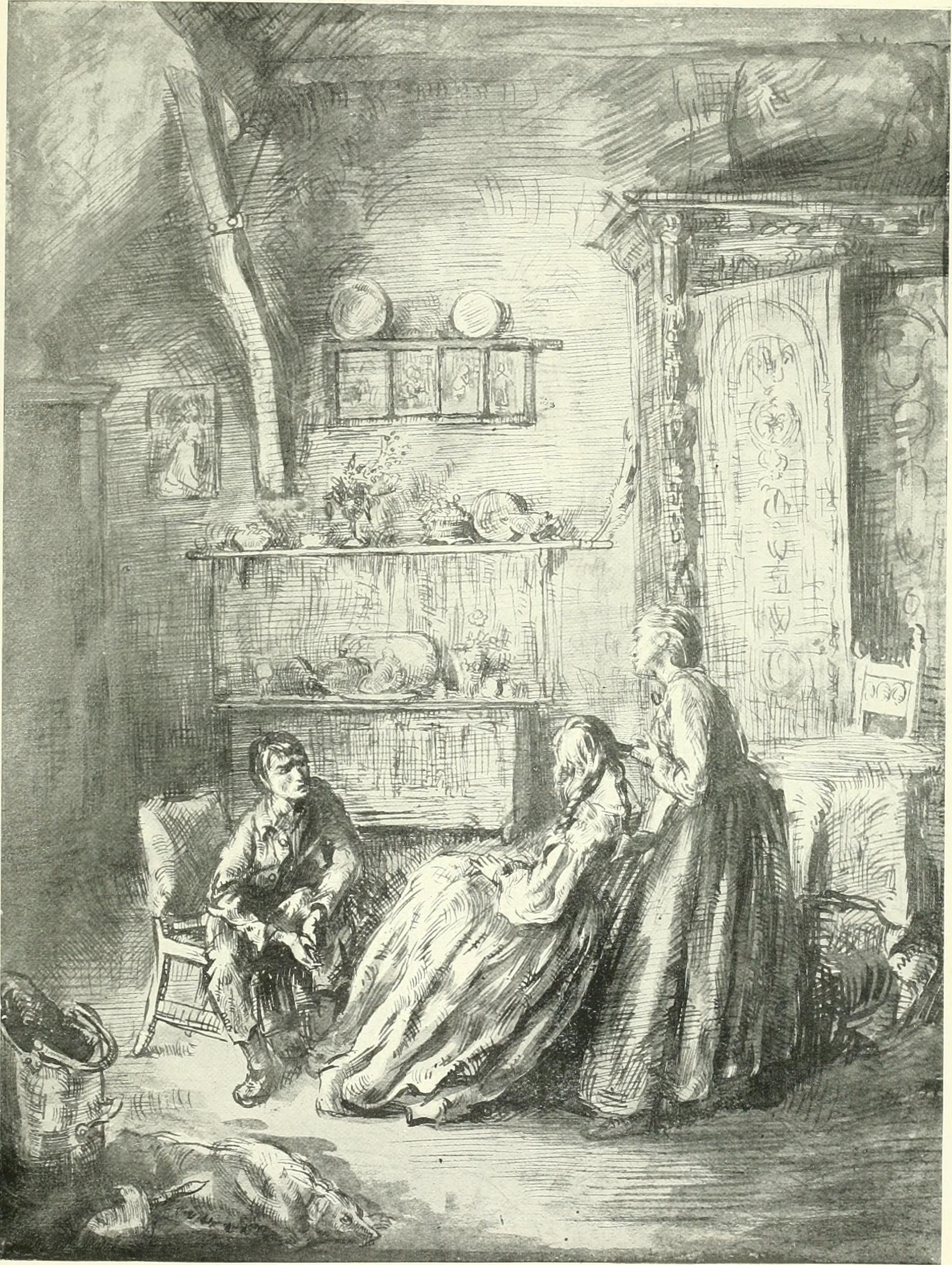
Heathcliff, Cathy, and Nelly Dean in a scene inside Wuthering Heights (Edna Clarke Hall)

Wuthering Heights is a fictional location in Emily Brontë's 1847 novel of the same name. A dark and unsightly place, it is the focus of much of the hateful turmoil for which the novel is renowned. It is most commonly associated with Heathcliff, the novel's primary male protagonist, who, through his devious machinations, eventually comes into ownership both of it and of Thrushcross Grange. Although the latter is by most accounts a far happier place, Heathcliff chooses to remain in the gloom of the Heights, a home far more amenable to his character.

== Appearance ==
The first description of Wuthering Heights is provided by Mr Lockwood, a tenant at the Grange and one of the two primary narrators:

Wuthering Heights is the name of Mr. Heathcliff's dwelling, "wuthering" being a significant provincial adjective, descriptive of the atmospheric tumult to which its station is exposed in stormy weather. Pure, bracing ventilation they must have up there at all times, indeed. One may guess the power of the north wind blowing over the edge by the excessive slant of a few stunted firs at the end of the house, and by a range of gaunt thorns all stretching their limbs one way, as if craving alms of the sun.

—

The building is a large, austere English country house, erected in 1500 by an ancestor named Hareton Earnshaw. Rooms mentioned in the text include the main living room (called "the house"), the kitchen (leading into the yard), and several bedrooms, including a garret where Joseph sleeps, and a spare room turned into a parlour for Heathcliff's son, Linton. When Mr Lockwood stays at the house, he sleeps in an oak-panelled closet enclosing the window of a small bedroom.

Before passing the threshold, I paused to admire a quantity of grotesque carving lavished over the front, and especially about the principal door; above which, among a wilderness of crumbling griffins and shameless little boys, I detected the date '1500', and the name 'Hareton Earnshaw'. I would have made a few comments, and requested a short history of the place from the surly owner; but his attitude at the door appeared to demand my speedy entrance, or complete departure, and I had no desire to aggravate his impatience previous to inspecting the penetralium.

Happily, the architect had foresight to build it strong: the narrow windows are deeply set in the wall, and the corners defended with large jutting stones.

— Description of the entrance, Chapter 1

== Possible inspiration ==
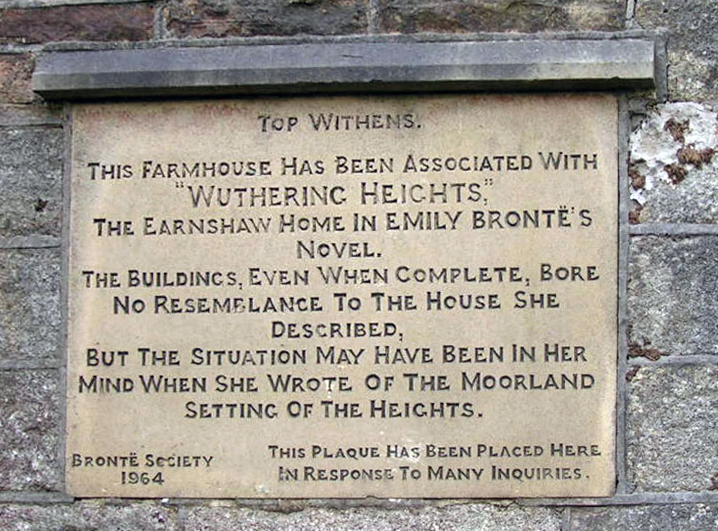
Sign at Top Withens

Many Gothic houses and manors have claimed or had claimed for them the title of Brontë's inspiration in creating the Heights. The best known of these is Top Withens, a ruined farmhouse near Haworth in West Yorkshire which Brontë's biographer Winifred Gérin seems to favour primarily because of its name: the word "Top" suggests "Heights", while "Withens" sounds very much like "Wuthering". An informational sign at the ruins of the house (destroyed by lightning in 1899) acknowledges that the setting is similar, although the building itself bears no resemblance to the house as described in the book.

== See also ==
- Brontë Parsonage Museum, home of the Brontë family
