= Heathcliff (Wuthering Heights) =

Fictional character by Emily Brontë

- Wuthering Heights character
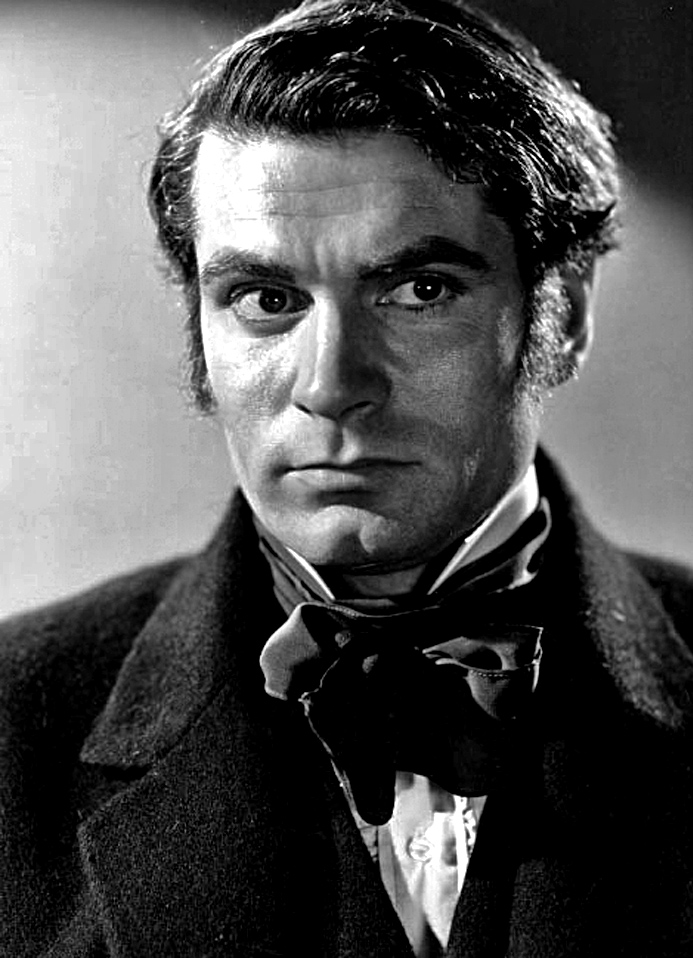
- Laurence Olivier as Heathcliff in 1939
- Created by: Emily Brontë
- Portrayed by: Laurence Olivier; Richard Burton; Timothy Dalton; Tom Hardy; Ralph Fiennes; Cliff Richard; Robert Cavanah; James Howson; Jacob Elordi

In-universe information
- Occupation: Farm-owner
- Spouse: Isabella Linton (wife)
- Children: Linton Heathcliff (son)
- Relatives: Hindley Earnshaw (foster brother); Catherine Earnshaw (foster sister and a significant other)
- Nationality: English

Heathcliff is a fictional character in Emily Brontë's 1847 novel Wuthering Heights. Owing to the novel's enduring fame and popularity, he is often regarded as an archetype of the Byronic hero, or the tortured antihero, whose all-consuming rage, jealousy and anger destroy both him and those around him.

He is better known for being a romantic hero due to his youthful love for Catherine Earnshaw, than for his final years of vengeance in the second half of the novel, during which he grows into a bitter, haunted man, and for a number of incidents in his early life that suggest that he was an upset and sometimes malicious individual from the beginning. His complicated, mesmerizing, absorbing, and altogether bizarre nature makes him a rare character, incorporating elements of both the hero and villain. Actors who have portrayed Heathcliff on screen include Laurence Olivier, Richard Burton, Timothy Dalton, Ralph Fiennes, Tom Hardy, Mike Vogel and Jacob Elordi.

== Character ==
You teach me now how cruel you've been—cruel and false! Why did you despise me? Why did you betray your own heart, Cathy? I have not one word of comfort. You deserve this. You have killed yourself. Yes, you may kiss me, and cry; and wring out my kisses and tears: they'll blight you—they'll damn you. You loved me—then what right had you to leave me? What right—answer me—for the poor fancy you felt for Linton? Because misery, and degradation, and death, and nothing God or Satan could inflict would have parted us, you, of your own will, did it. I have not broken your heart—you have broken it; and in breaking it, you have broken mine. (Note: These words echo eerily sentiments expressed by Catherine five chapters earlier: "Well if I cannot keep Heathcliff for my friend—if Edgar will be mean and jealous, I'll try to break their hearts by breaking my own. That will be a prompt way of finishing all when I am pushed to extremity!" The trope of the broken heart is used again in her famous "I am Heathcliff" speech: "Heaven did not seem to be my home, and I broke my heart with weeping to come back to earth, and the angels were so angry that they flung me out into the middle of the heath on the top of Wuthering Heights; where I woke sobbing for joy.") So much the worse for me, that I am strong. Do I want to live? What kind of living will it be when you—oh, God! would you like to live with your soul in the grave? (Note: "I want you to be aware," he breaks out, less famously, on another occasion, "that I know you have treated me infernally—infernally! Do you hear? And if you flatter yourself that I don't perceive it, you are a fool; and if you think I can be consoled by sweet words, you are an idiot: and if you fancy I'll suffer unrevenged, I'll convince you of the contrary, in a very little while! Meantime, thank you for telling me your sister-in-law's secret [love for him]: I swear I'll make the most of it. And stand you aside!")

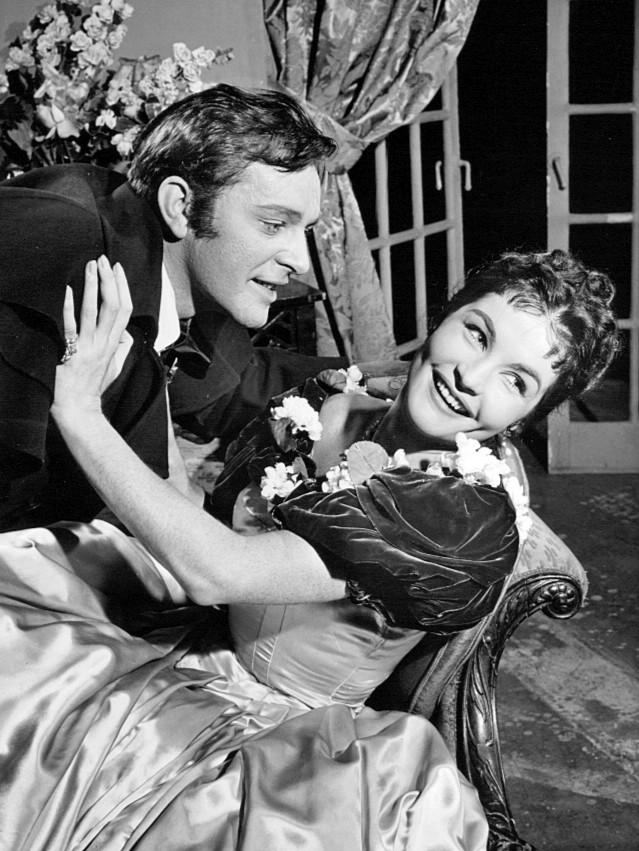
Heathcliff (played by Richard Burton) with Catherine (played by Yvonne Furneaux) in a 1958 adaptation of Wuthering Heights

A foundling discovered on the streets of Liverpool and raised by the Earnshaw family of Wuthering Heights in Yorkshire, Heathcliff's past and early childhood before his mysterious adoption are only hinted at by Brontë. In keeping with the supernatural themes present in the novel, it is speculated that Heathcliff might be a demon or a hellish soul. Heathcliff is first described as a "dark-skinned gipsy" in appearance with "black eyes", as well as later being said to be "as white as the wall behind him" and "pale...with an expression of mortal hate." Mr Linton, the Earnshaws' neighbour, suggests that he might be "a little Lascar, or an American or Spanish castaway". His long dark hair described as "colt's mane over his eyes"

A silent and at first, a solitary child, Heathcliff is initially resented by both Catherine Earnshaw and her elder brother, Hindley; while Catherine later befriends and loves Heathcliff, Hindley continues to resent him, seeing him as an interloper who has stolen his father's affection. Upon Mr Earnshaw's death and his inheritance of the estate, the spiteful Hindley proceeds to treat Heathcliff as little more than a servant boy and makes him work the fields, which compounds Heathcliff's lifelong anger and resentment. Catherine, however, remains close to her foster brother throughout her early years.

As she matures into her young teens, however, Catherine grows close to Edgar Linton, a timid and well-bred young man from the neighbouring estate, Thrushcross Grange, and accepts his proposal of marriage; but, she insists that her true and only love is Heathcliff. She claims that she cannot marry him because it "would degrade her" and that the two would be beggars were such a union to take place. Nevertheless, she also declares her passion for him in such ways as "whatever our souls are made of, his and mine are the same", and the famous quote "I am Heathcliff." Aware only of Catherine's decision to marry Edgar, rather than her proclamation of true love for him, a bitter Heathcliff leaves Wuthering Heights upon overhearing her saying that it would degrade her and while away, by means unknown, makes his fortune.

Nelly Dean describes him as "lazy" when he returns and that his "upright carriage suggested his being in the army." No other hints are given about where Heathcliff was and how he made his fortune over the course of his three-year absence. On returning, he is ruthlessly determined to destroy those who degraded him and prevented him from being with Catherine, cementing his status as an anti-hero, rather than a romantic hero. Not only does he manipulate Hindley, who has fallen into alcoholism and gambling after the death of his wife, Frances, into mortgaging Wuthering Heights and encumbering Hindley's son's inheritance; he heartlessly takes advantage of Edgar Linton's sister Isabella and marries her, before treating her in a cruel and contemptuous fashion. Although he tells Catherine that he despises Isabella and would "cut (his own) throat" if he imagined Catherine wanted him to marry Edgar's younger sister, his and Isabella's marriage promises to result in any son of the union inheriting Thrushcross Grange when Edgar Linton dies.

After Catherine's death, Heathcliff's vindictive cruelty intensifies, aimed at destroying not only his enemies but also their heirs — Hareton, son of Hindley and Frances Earnshaw, and Catherine, daughter of Edgar Linton and Catherine the elder. Heathcliff forces his sickly son, Linton, who entirely resembles his mother, Isabella, into marriage with Catherine Linton, daughter of Cathy and Edgar, in a bid to gain control through him of Catherine's inheritance of personal property. Shortly after the two are married the insipid Linton dies, hardly a surprise to either his father or his widow. In his final illness he had been pressured into signing a will, naming his father as heir of all his own (and therefore Catherine's) personal property. Heathcliff treats Catherine with relative mercy, turning her into a cold, distant creature, far removed from the bright, lively girl she used to be. Hareton and Catherine eventually fall in love, however, and their relationship in some ways mirrors and in others opposes that between Heathcliff and the elder Catherine. Their union breaks the cycle of hatred at Wuthering Heights, and Heathcliff no longer cares to continue his vendetta. Hareton, resembling his aunt Catherine Earnshaw much in looks, creates a sense of uneasiness for Heathcliff: Brontë often implies that he has secret regard for Hareton and that Hareton sees Heathcliff as his true father since Heathcliff raised him. The novel ends with the death of Heathcliff, who has become a broken, tormented man, haunted by the ghost of the elder Catherine, next to whom he demands to be buried. His corpse is initially found by Nelly Dean, who, peeping into his room, spots him. Heathcliff grows restless towards the very end of the novel and stops eating. Nelly Dean does not believe that he had the intention to commit suicide, but that his starvation may have been the cause of his death. He wanted to be with Cathy in eternal life.

laid on his back. His eyes met mine so keen and fierce, I started, and then he seemed to smile. I could not think him dead: but his face and throat were washed with rain; the bed-clothes dripped, and he was perfectly still. The lattice, flapping to and fro, had grazed one hand that rested on the sill; no blood trickled from the broken skin, and when I put my fingers to it, I could doubt no more: he was dead and stark!

The implication is that Catherine, having earlier haunted Mr Lockwood at his window, has made a similar visitation on Heathcliff, bearing him away with her so that she may possess him beyond the grave, which has long been Heathcliff's aspiration too. Nelly relates his revealing admission:

"I got the sexton, who was digging Linton's grave, to remove the earth off her coffin lid, and I opened it. I thought, once, I would have stayed there, when I saw her face again—it is hers yet—he had hard work to stir me; but he said it would change if the air blew on it, and so I struck one side of the coffin loose and covered it up—not Linton's side, damn him! I wish he'd been soldered in lead—and I bribed the sexton to pull it away, when I'm laid there, and slide mine out too. I'll have it made so, and then, by the time Linton gets to us, he'll not know which is which!" "You were very wicked, Mr Heathcliff!" I exclaimed; "were you not ashamed to disturb the dead?"

In his final days, Heathcliff had considered cementing his triumph over the Linton and Earnshaw families by writing a will disinheriting both Catherine and Hareton of all property except the two landed estates (which he possesses, but does not own outright), but is prevented from doing so through continual interruption from his hauntings. He dies intestate – his revenge incomplete, so that Hareton and Catherine at the end of the novel are exercising undisputed ownership of the two estates respectively and of the property they contain.

At the very close of the novel, a servant boy tells Nelly that he has seen the ghosts of Heathcliff and Catherine walking the moors together, although Nelly and Lockwood both insist that they must be treated as if their souls were at peace. The novel closes with Lockwood wandering past their graves and wondering "how anyone could ever imagine unquiet slumbers for the sleepers in that quiet earth."

As Charlotte Brontë, Emily's older sister wrote, "Heathcliff, indeed, stands unredeemed; never once swerving in his arrow-straight course to perdition", which adds to the uncertainty over whether he repented for his sins since Lockwood's vision of Catherine at the window was preceded by a dream of a fire-and-brimstone sermon in a church, it is possible that both Heathcliff and Catherine are damned; Catherine herself expresses doubt as to whether she could ever be admitted into Heaven. However, A Companion to the Brontës states "Charlotte seems to most willfully "misread" Emily's tale in order to repackage it to a polite society", adding "Wuthering Heights is the very opposite of a linear novel, and there is nothing whatsoever "arrow-straight" about Heathcliff." The uncertain fate of Heathcliff's soul, combined with the mystery that Heathcliff's character leaves behind, ends the novel in a mesmerizing, eerie way, justifying Heathcliff's enduring status as an iconic anti-hero of literature.

== Ethnicity ==
Heathcliff's ethnicity is never explicitly stated in the novel. While his origins remain ambiguous, Heathcliff’s identity has been explored by Brontë scholars over the years. In Wuthering Heights and the Liverpool Slave Trade, Maja-Lisa von Sneidern argues that Heathcliff’s "racial otherness cannot be a matter of dispute". Several characters speculate about his background. When Lockwood first meets him, he describes Heathcliff as "a dark-skinned gipsy in aspect". Mr Linton refers to him as "a strange acquisition [...] a little Lascar, or an American or Spanish castaway". In Chapter VII, the young Heathcliff says he wishes he had "light hair and a fair skin" as well as "Edgar Linton’s great blue eyes and even forehead". Nelly soothes him, saying that a "good heart" would make him look attractive even if he were "a regular black". She calls him "handsome [...] fit for a prince in disguise", and fantasises that his "father was Emperor of China, [...] mother an Indian queen", and that he had been "kidnapped by wicked sailors and brought to England".

Heathcliff is frequently referred to as a "gipsy" and is described using the language and imagery associated with Romani people. That term is used by a wide range of characters, including Lockwood, Nelly Dean, Hindley Earnshaw, Mrs Linton, Joseph, and Edgar Linton. In Chapter VI, when the young Isabella Linton sees him for the first time, she exclaims: "Frightful thing! Put him in the cellar, papa. He's exactly like the son of the fortune-teller that stole my tame pheasant."

References to Heathcliff having "black hair, [...] black, deep-set eyes, thick brows, and dark skin" coupled with Liverpool's involvement in the Atlantic slave trade have led to suggestions that Heathcliff could be of African descent. "In 1769, the year in which Mr Earnshaw found Heathcliff in the Liverpool streets, the city was England’s largest slave-trading port, conducting seventy to eighty-five percent of the English slave trade". There are records of African slaveholders and runaway slaves in 18th century Yorkshire, and late 18th-century England was home to thousands of Black people. Liverpool was known as a slavetrading port and not a market town to which a gentleman farmer, Mr Earnshaw, would be expected to have business. Heathcliff's mononymity has been said to have allusions to slavery.

Heathcliff's relationship with Earnshaw: his preparedness to travel with him; the moral support he receives from him; receiving the name of his deceased son; the fact that a strange child is brought into a stable 'close-knit family structure', has led people to believe he is the illegitimate issue of Mr Earnshaw and is of mixed race.

Another theory is that Mr Earnshaw did not travel to Liverpool but instead collected Heathcliff from a gypsy encampment nearer to Wuthering Heights on account of the impracticality of walking to Liverpool, the presents of a fiddle and a whip being items that could plausibly have been acquired in such a camp. The presents have also been described as being "objects emblematic of the cruelty and indolence nurtured by institutionalised slavery".

Terry Eagleton, in Myths of Power: A Marxist Study of the Brontës, describes Heathcliff as having "no defined place within [the Earnshaw's] biological and economic systems". In Heathcliff and the Great Hunger: Studies in Irish Culture, Eagleton presents Heathcliff symbolically as a representation of Irish people.

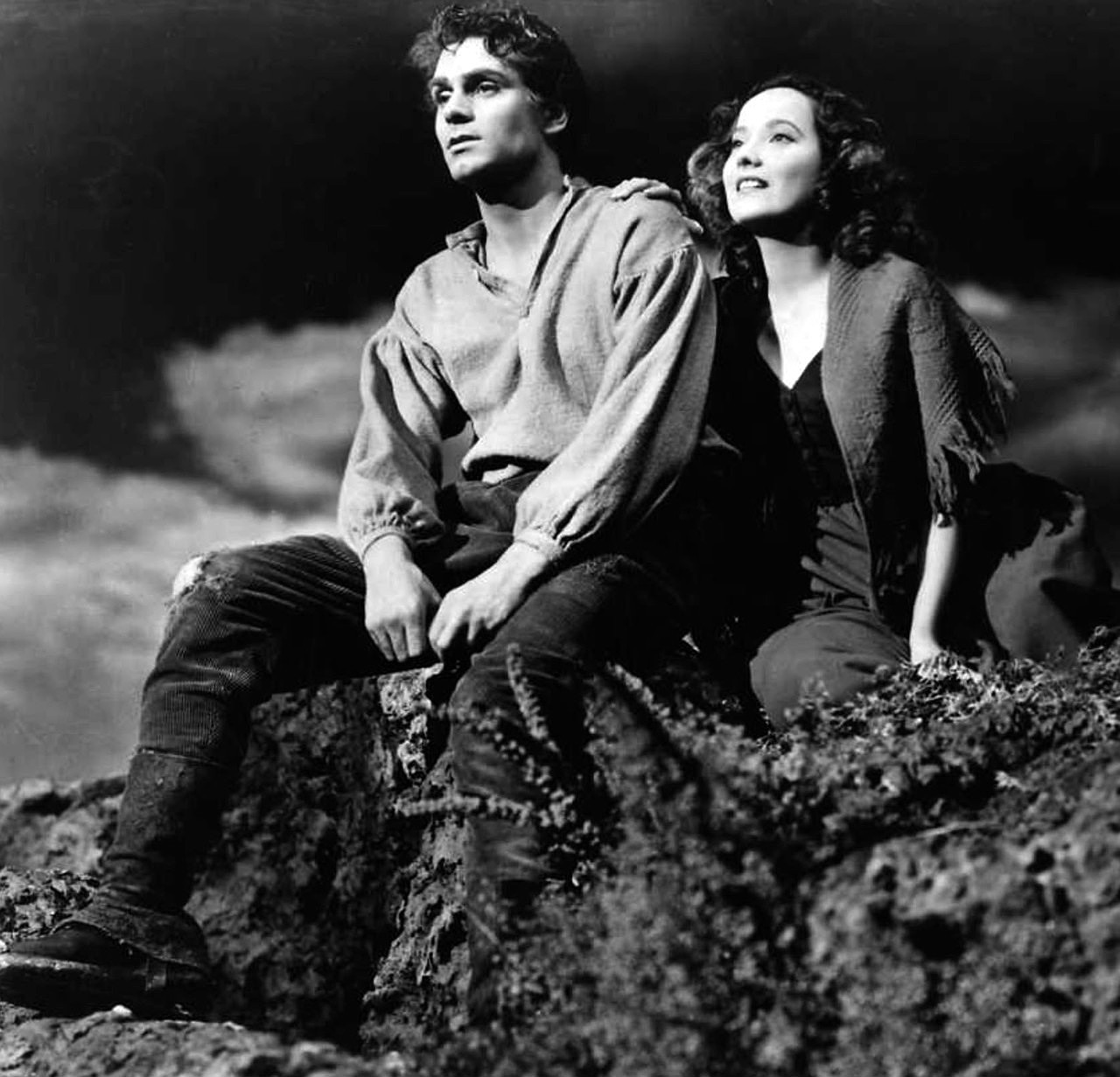
Heathcliff (played by Olivier) and Catherine (played by Merle Oberon) as portrayed in the 1939 film

== Depictions ==
In 1939, Laurence Olivier portrayed Heathcliff in Wuthering Heights, directed by William Wyler. He received an Oscar nomination for Best Actor for his performance.

Indian actor Dilip Kumar played localized versions of the character in three film adaptations of the novel Arzoo (1950), Hulchul (1951) and Dil Diya Dard Liya (1966).

In 1958, Richard Burton played Heathcliff in "Wuthering Heights", a 90-minute television episode of the anthology series DuPont Show of the Month.

In 1967, Ian McShane portrayed Heathcliff in Wuthering Heights, a five-part adaptation airing on BBC 2, directed by Peter Sasdy.

In 1970, Timothy Dalton portrayed Heathcliff in Wuthering Heights, directed by Robert Fuest.

Ralph Fiennes's portrayal of Heathcliff in 1992's Emily Brontë's Wuthering Heights marked the second film adaptation to attempt to involve Hareton and Cathy in the story as well. The first attempt was made in a 1920 silent film now believed to be lost. ITV's 1998 TV drama, which had Robert Cavanah in the starring role, also told the full story.

In 1997, Cliff Richard played Heathcliff in a stage musical. Focusing mainly on the life of Heathcliff, his quest to win Cathy, and his life after her death, the music is by John Farrar and lyrics are by Sir Tim Rice. Cliff Richard released the movie Heathcliff in 1997 and it was such a success that he brought it to the Birmingham stage in 1998.

In 2002, Sarah Smart portrayed a female version of Heathcliff in Sparkhouse, a modern-day, gender-swapped adaptation of Wuthering Heights, scripted by Sally Wainwright.

Masterpiece Theatre presented a 2009 two-part series of Wuthering Heights starring Tom Hardy as Heathcliff. In this version, the second-generation characters play a key role, and the telling of the story begins and ends with them.

In 2011, director Andrea Arnold directed a film adaptation starring James Howson as Heathcliff.

Jacob Elordi portrays Heathcliff in the 2026 adaptation by Emerald Fennell, with Owen Cooper portraying the young version of the character.

== In popular culture ==
"Wuthering Heights", a single from Kate Bush's 1978 debut album, The Kick Inside, is told from the perspective of a ghostly Catherine Earnshaw visiting an aged Heathcliff.

In her song "David Duchovny," Bree Sharp refers to David Duchovny as "American Heathcliff, brooding and comely."

In July 2008, the then British Prime Minister, Gordon Brown, compared himself to the character, saying that he was "Maybe an older Heathcliff, a wiser Heathcliff." The comparison was mocked by some. For example, Andrew McCarthy, acting director of the Brontë Parsonage Museum, said that "Heathcliff is a man prone to domestic violence, kidnapping, possible murder and digging up his dead lover. He is moody and unkind to animals. Is this really a good role model for the prime minister?"

The opening track to the UK melodic hard rock band Ten's eleventh studio album Albion, "Alone in the Dark", is based on Heathcliff's internal struggles as depicted in Wuthering Heights.

The 2023 Korean indie gacha strategy game Limbus Company features Heathcliff as one of 12 selectable characters or "Sinners", of which his story (Canto VI) and its characters are mostly taken out of and inspired by the novel.
