= Catherine Earnshaw =

Character in Wuthering Heights

- Wuthering Heights character
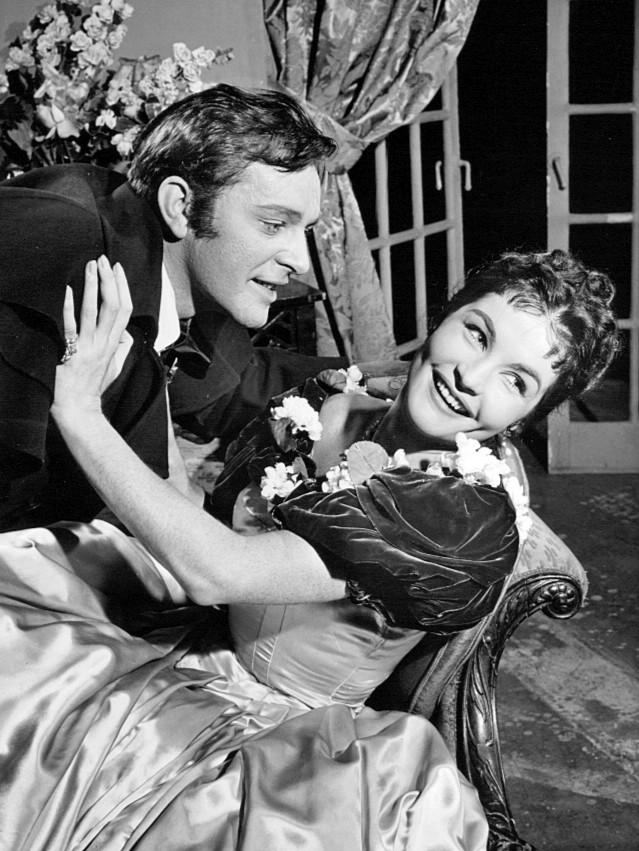
- Catherine (portrayed by Yvonne Furneaux) and Heathcliff (Richard Burton) as portrayed in a 1958 adaptation of Wuthering Heights.
- Created by: Emily Brontë
- Portrayed by: Merle Oberon; Katherine Blake; Yvonne Mitchell; Rosemary Harris; Delia Williams; Angela Scoular; Anna Calder-Marshall; Kay Adshead; Juliette Binoche; Orla Brady; Charlotte Riley; Kaya Scodelario; Margot Robbie

In-universe information
- Nickname: Cathy
- Gender: Female
- Family: Mr. Earnshaw (father); Mrs. Earnshaw (mother); Hindley (brother); Frances (sister-in-law); Hareton (nephew); Heathcliff (foster brother and a significant other)
- Spouse: Edgar Linton
- Children: Catherine Linton (daughter)
- Nationality: British

Catherine Earnshaw (later Catherine Linton) is the female protagonist of the 1847 novel Wuthering Heights written by Emily Brontë. Catherine is one of two surviving children born to Mr. and Mrs. Earnshaw, the original tenants of the Wuthering Heights estate. The star-crossed love between her and Heathcliff is one of the primary focuses of the novel. Catherine is often referred to as "Cathy," particularly by Heathcliff.

== Biography ==
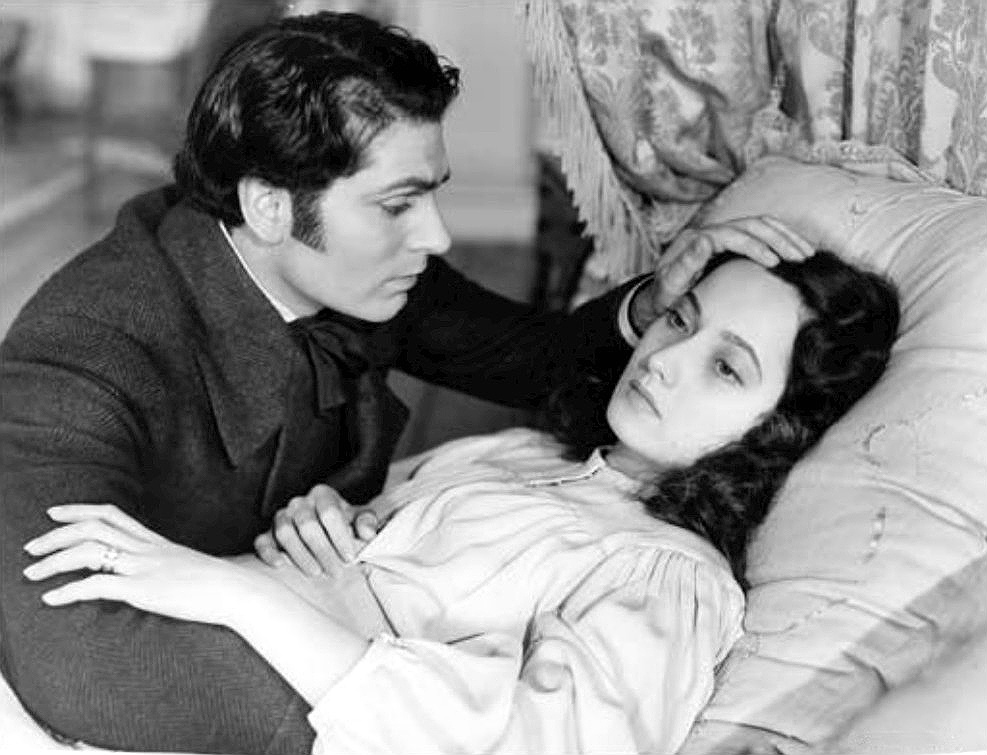
Catherine (portrayed by Merle Oberon) and Heathcliff as portrayed in the 1939 film.

Cathy Earnshaw is the younger sister of Hindley Earnshaw. Cathy and Hindley are born and raised at Wuthering Heights. The siblings are later joined by the foundling Mr. Earnshaw comes across in Liverpool and later names Heathcliff, after a son he and Mrs. Earnshaw lost in childbirth. Heathcliff and Hindley develop a rivalry, and Catherine and Heathcliff develop a close bond, as they are both wild and unruly. Following the death of Mr. Earnshaw, Hindley demotes Heathcliff to the role of a servant and attempts, with the help of his wife, to limit the interactions between Catherine and Heathcliff.

Catherine and Heathcliff still manage to spend time together, and while the two of them spy on the Thrushcross Grange estate, the residence of the Linton family, Catherine is attacked by one of the Lintons' dogs. The Lintons then take in Catherine and nurse her injuries, and Heathcliff is driven out of the estate and back to Wuthering Heights. Upon returning from her time with the Lintons, Catherine has developed more refined manners and become friends with Edgar and Isabella Linton. Catherine becomes spoiled and vicious, often taking it out on her servant and foster-sister Nelly.

Eventually, Edgar Linton begins to court Catherine, and Heathcliff observes jealously. Catherine's most famous speech in the novel comes when she declares her feelings for Heathcliff and Edgar to Nelly Dean, the housekeeper of Wuthering Heights and the novel's main narrator:

Heaven did not seem to be my home; and I broke my heart with weeping to come back to earth; and the angels were so angry that they flung me out into the middle of the heath on the top of Wuthering Heights; where I woke sobbing for joy. That will do to explain my secret, as well as the other. I've no more business to marry Edgar Linton than I have to be in heaven; and if the wicked man in there, had not brought Heathcliff so low I shouldn't have thought of it. It would degrade me to marry Heathcliff now; so he shall never know how I love him; and that, not because he's handsome, Nelly, but because he's more myself than I am. Whatever our souls are made of, his and mine are the same, and Linton's is as different as a moonbeam from lightning, or frost from fire.

Unbeknownst to Catherine, Heathcliff was eavesdropping on her conversation with Nelly, but only heard the beginning of her speech. Under the impression that Catherine would never marry him, Heathcliff goes on a three-year hiatus from Wuthering Heights which is not elaborated on in the book. During Heathcliff's absence, Catherine marries Edgar Linton and moves into Thrushcross Grange, where she lives peacefully, her every desire indulged.

Upon his return, Heathcliff pays a visit to Thrushcross Grange, which causes Catherine great excitement, and Edgar deepest dread:

Mr. Linton walked to a window on the other side of the room that overlooked the court. He unfastened it, and leant out. I [Nelly] suppose they were below, for he exclaimed quickly: "Don't stand there, love! Bring the person in, if it be anyone particular." Ere long, I heard the click of the latch, and Catherine flew up-stairs, breathless and wild; too excited to show gladness: indeed, by her face, you would rather have surmised an awful calamity.

In an awkward set of visits to the Grange, Heathcliff begins to exact his revenge, seducing Isabella Linton in order to gain control of Thrushcross Grange at Edgar's death, and trapping her in an abusive and terrifying marriage. Cathy falls into a state of psychological insanity, although it is partly feigned in her desire to provoke her husband and "break his heart" because of the pain that she feels after being forbidden to see Heathcliff. Soon she refuses to eat, never leaves her chamber, and falls prey to countless delusions and declarations of madness. It is later revealed she is pregnant. She never fully recovers from her bout of delirium, and remains weak for the rest of her life.

It's a rough journey, and a sad heart to travel it; and we must pass by Gimmerton Kirk to go that journey! We've braved its ghosts often together, and dared each other to stand among the graves and ask them to come. But, Heathcliff, if I dare you now, will you venture? If you do, I'll keep you. I'll not lie there by myself: they may bury me twelve feet deep, and throw the church down over me, but I won't rest till you are with me. I never will!

— Cathy Earnshaw, during a delusional fit (for which Heathcliff is not present), in Emily Brontë's Wuthering Heights

Heathcliff and Cathy share one final meeting, about halfway through the story, which is aided reluctantly by Nelly because of Edgar's banishment of Heathcliff from the Grange. The lovers pour out their passions to one another: Cathy accuses Heathcliff of killing her, and Heathcliff laments that he cannot live when "his soul is in the grave". However, when Edgar walks unexpectedly through the door to the chamber, Cathy experiences a state of shock and faints. She dies a couple of hours after giving birth to a daughter, also named Catherine (but only referred to as Cathy throughout the novel), whose generation forms the basis of the second half of the story.

Catherine's spirit lives throughout the novel. Her ghost haunts Heathcliff up to his mysterious death, and an iconic scene sees Lockwood, the first narrator in the book, visited in eerie, Gothic fashion by her ghost as a little girl, lost on the moors. In Lockwood's vision, she tries to enter the house through a window; at the end of the novel Heathcliff, having become desperate to see his lost love again, is found dead before an open window. The open window is therefore a symbol of Catherine's enduring power throughout the course of the story, and of her ultimate reunion with her love; however, it also raises ambiguities as to the nature of the reunion.

After Heathcliff dies, he is buried next to Cathy, uniting them in death.

== Description ==
Cathy is described as pretty, with, as Nelly says, "the bonniest eye" and "the sweetest smile." She has long locks of "beautiful" brown hair, as Heathcliff describes it.

Cathy is willful, wild, passionate, mischievous and, as a child, spoiled. During Cathy's fatal illness, Nelly notes that Catherine is very frail, and has "a bloodless lip", an image which serves to augment the Gothic undertones of her final days; nevertheless, Nelly describes her in death as divine: "no angel in heaven looked as beautiful as her", and her countenance resembled "perfect peace".

== In modern society and popular culture ==
Cathy delivers many of the lines which have become synonymous with the work, such as her renowned declaration of love for Heathcliff —

My love for Linton is like the foliage in the woods. Time will change it, I'm well aware, as winter changes the trees — my love for Heathcliff resembles the eternal rocks beneath — a source of little visible delight, but necessary. Nelly, I am Heathcliff — he's always, always in my mind — not as a pleasure, any more than I am always a pleasure to myself — but as my own being — so, don't talk of our separation again — it is impracticable. (Heathcliff, for his part, provides a similar comparison between the respective loves that he and Linton feel for her: "If he loved with all the powers of his puny being, he could not love as much in eighty years as I could in a day")

— and the famous ghostly utterance, "Let me in your window – I'm so cold!", was later used by Kate Bush in her 1978 hit "Wuthering Heights". Many film adaptations of the novel have been made, particularly the 1939 version with Laurence Olivier and Merle Oberon, which covers only half of the story, ending with Catherine's death rather than the lives of the younger Cathy, Hareton, and Linton Heathcliff. Thematically, Catherine and her choice to marry Edgar rather than Heathcliff are central to the issues of nature versus nurture, self versus society, class division, and violence in Wuthering Heights, as well as to the antitheses of good and evil, and physical existence and spiritual existence, which pervade the novel.
