= Lara Naki Gutmann =

Italian figure skater (born 2002)

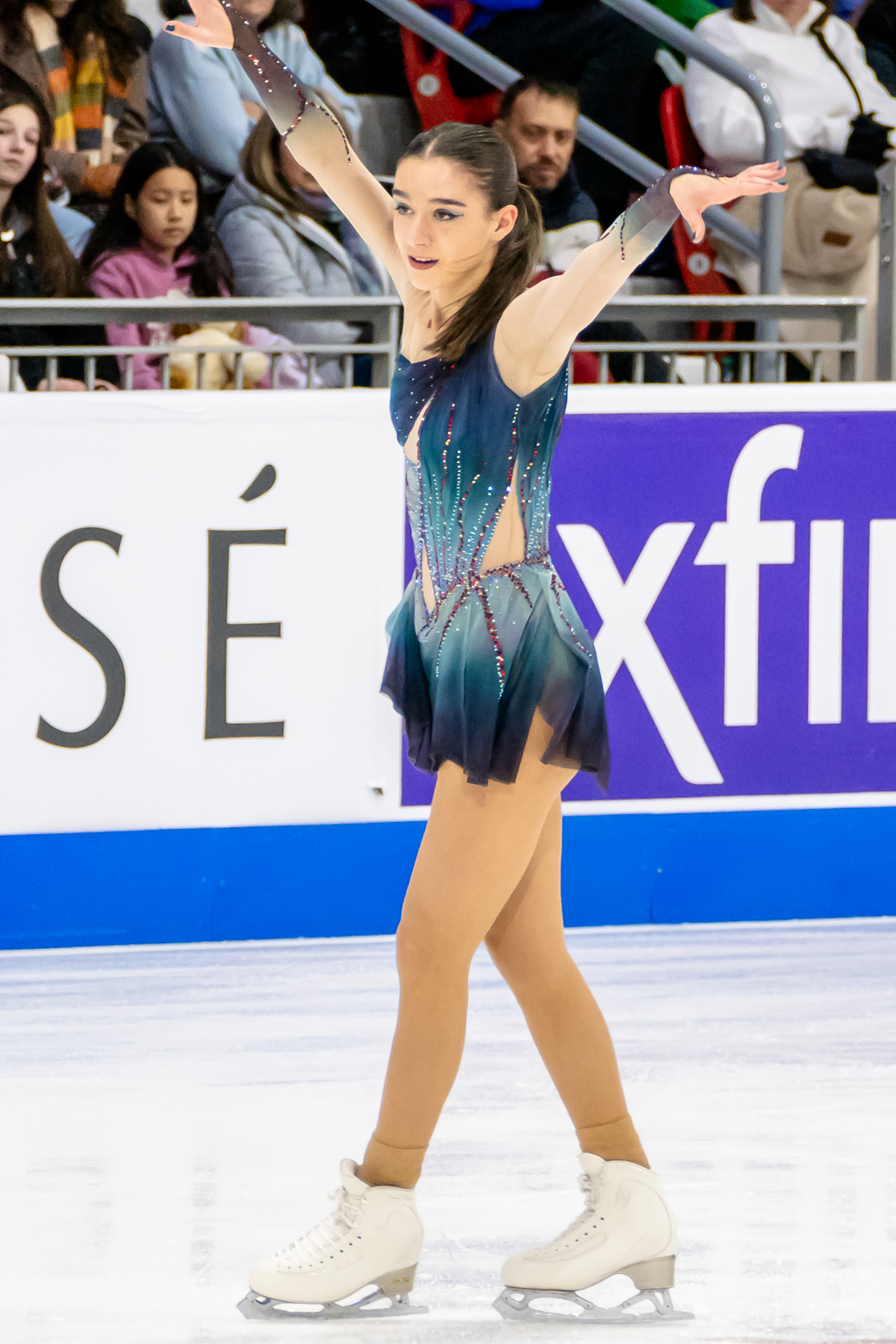
- Lara Naki Gutmann during her free skate at 2025 Skate America

Personal information
- Born: 6 November 2002 (age 24) Trento, Italy
- Home town: Rovereto, Italy
- Height: 1.70 m (5 ft 7 in)

Figure skating career
- Country: Italy
- Discipline: Women's singles
- Coach: Gabriele Minchio; Stephanie Cuel; Linda Mariotti
- Skating club: Gruppo Sportivo Fiamme Oro Moena
- Began skating: 2007

Medal record
Olympic Games
Bronze medal – third place	2026 Milano Cortina	Team
European Championships
Bronze medal – third place	2026 Sheffield	Singles
Italian Championships
Gold medal – first place	2021 Egna	Singles
Gold medal – first place	2022 Turin	Singles
Gold medal – first place	2023 Brunico	Singles
Gold medal – first place	2026 Bergamo	Singles
Silver medal – second place	2024 Pinerolo	Singles
Silver medal – second place	2025 Varese	Singles
Bronze medal – third place	2019 Trento	Singles
Bronze medal – third place	2020 Bergamo	Singles
World Team Trophy
Bronze medal – third place	2025 Tokyo	Team

Lara Naki Gutmann (born 6 November 2002) is an Italian figure skater. She is a 2026 Olympic Games team event bronze medalist, the 2026 European bronze medalist, a two-time ISU Grand Prix bronze medalist, a six-time ISU Challenger Series medalist (one gold, one silver, three bronze), and a four-time Italian national champion (2021–23, 2026).

She represented Italy at both the 2022 and 2026 Winter Olympics.

== Personal life ==
Gutmann was born on November 6, 2002 in Trento, Italy. Her middle name, "Naki," is Ghanaian and means "first daughter." In addition, she is multilingual and able to fluently communicate in Italian, English, and German.

She graduated from University of Camerino in 2025 with a degree in the Legal Sciences for Organizational Innovation and Social Cohesion.

Gutmann's figure skating idols are Yuna Kim and Carolina Kostner.

== Career ==
=== Early years ===
Gutmann began learning to skate in 2006 after watching Carolina Kostner compete during the 2006 Winter Olympics in Turin, Italy. She won her first junior national medal, bronze, in December 2015 and had the same result the following year.

Her ISU Junior Grand Prix (JGP) debut came in October 2017 at JGP Italy, where she finished thirteenth. In December 2017, she became the Italian junior national silver medalist.

=== 2018–2019 season: Senior debut ===
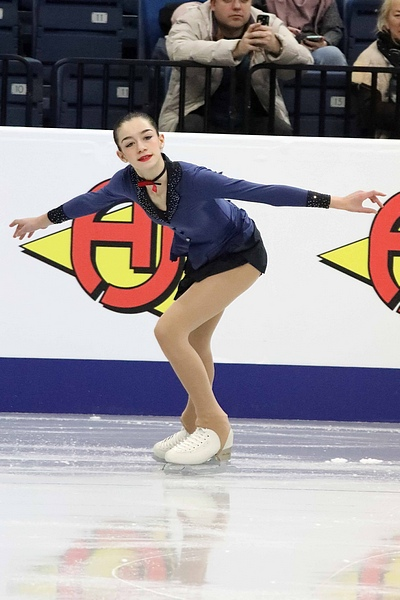
Gutmann at the 2019 European Championships

Gutmann placed nineteenth at her sole JGP assignment in Austria. In December 2018, making her first senior international appearance, she won silver at the Bosphorus Cup in Turkey. Later that month, she won bronze in the senior ladies' category at the Italian Championships, behind Alessia Tornaghi and Lucrezia Beccari, and was named in Italy's team to the 2019 European Championships. Ranked twenty-ninth in the short program, she did not advance to the final segment at the latter event, which took place in January in Minsk, Belarus.

=== 2019–2020 season ===
Gutmann competed mainly in the senior ranks, with the exception of two JGP events. She finished sixth at JGP France and seventh at JGP Italy. In December, she repeated as national bronze medalist, this time finishing third behind Tornaghi and Marina Piredda. In February, she won silver behind Roberta Rodeghiero at the Dragon Trophy in Ljubljana, Slovenia, and then outscored Emmi Peltonen to take gold at the Nordic Championships in Stavanger, Norway.

=== 2020–2021 season: First national title ===
In the off-season, Gutmann underwent ankle surgery. She was scheduled to make her Grand Prix debut at the 2020 Internationaux de France, but the event was cancelled as a result of the COVID-19 pandemic. In December, she won the gold medal at the 2021 Italian national championships.

As the Italian national champion, Gutmann was named as the country's sole entry to the 2021 World Championships in Stockholm, where she finished twenty-eighth. Subsequently, she was announced as part of the Italian team for the 2021 World Team Trophy. Gutmann placed seventh in both segments of the competition and set personal bests in the free skate and total score, while Team Italy finished in fourth place.

=== 2021–2022 season: Beijing Olympics ===
Gutmann began the season on home soil at the 2021 CS Lombardia Trophy. After a poor short program left her in eighteenth position going into the free skate, she placed third in that segment and rose to fifth overall. She next competed at the 2021 CS Nebelhorn Trophy, seeking to qualify for a berth for Italian women at the 2022 Winter Olympics. Seventh in both segments of the competition, she placed eighth overall, 0.75 points behind Australia's Kailani Craine, who took the sixth of six available places. As a result, Italy became the first alternate country.

Following the cancellation of the 2021 Cup of China, Italy unexpectedly became the host of the third event in the Grand Prix, the 2021 Gran Premio d'Italia. Gutmann was one of two Italian women assigned to compete at the home Grand Prix (along with Lucrezia Beccari), making her Grand Prix debut with an eleventh-place finish.

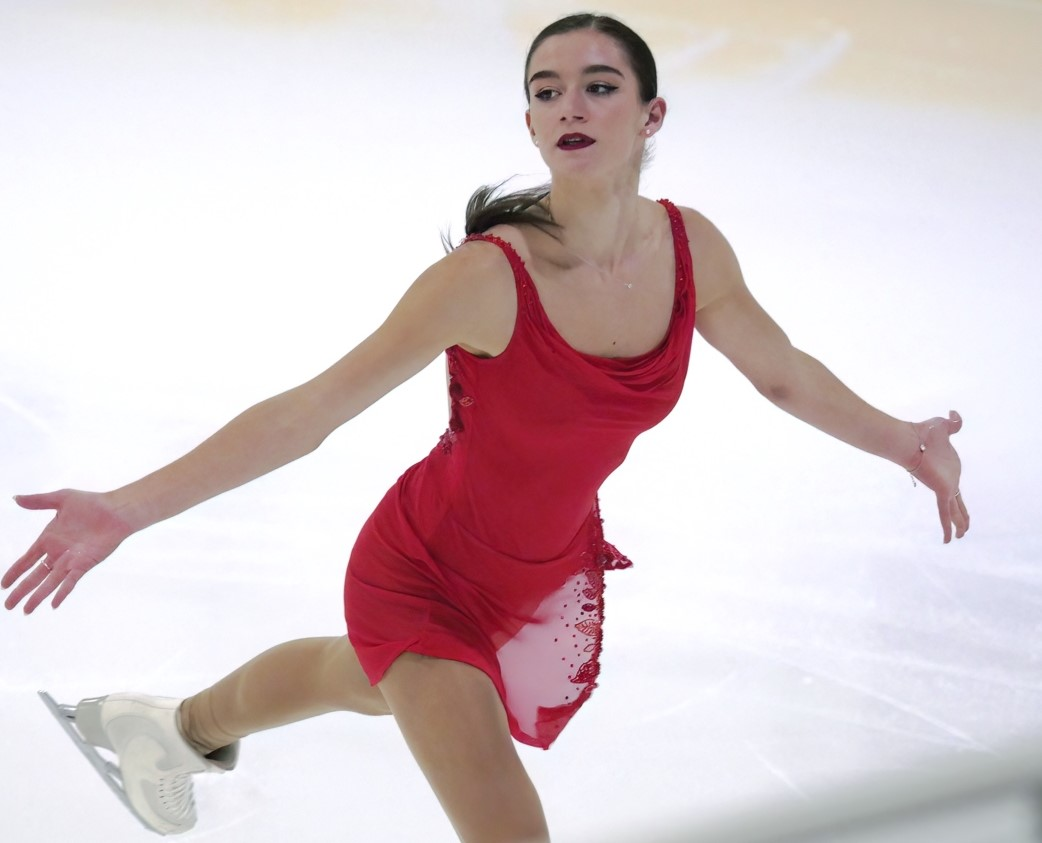
Gutmann performing her short program at the 2022 CS Lombardia Trophy

At the Italian Championships, Gutmann won her second straight national title. She was after that named to the Italian Olympic team, though she would only be competing in the team event. She began the new year at the 2022 European Championships, finishing sixteenth. Representing Italy in the team event, Gutmann skated cleanly in the short program, but did not attempt a triple-triple jump combination and finished ninth of ten skaters. The Italian team finished seventh among the teams in the short program segments and did not advance to the second phase. Gutmann finished the season with a twentieth place at the 2022 World Championships.

=== 2022–2023 season: Third national title ===
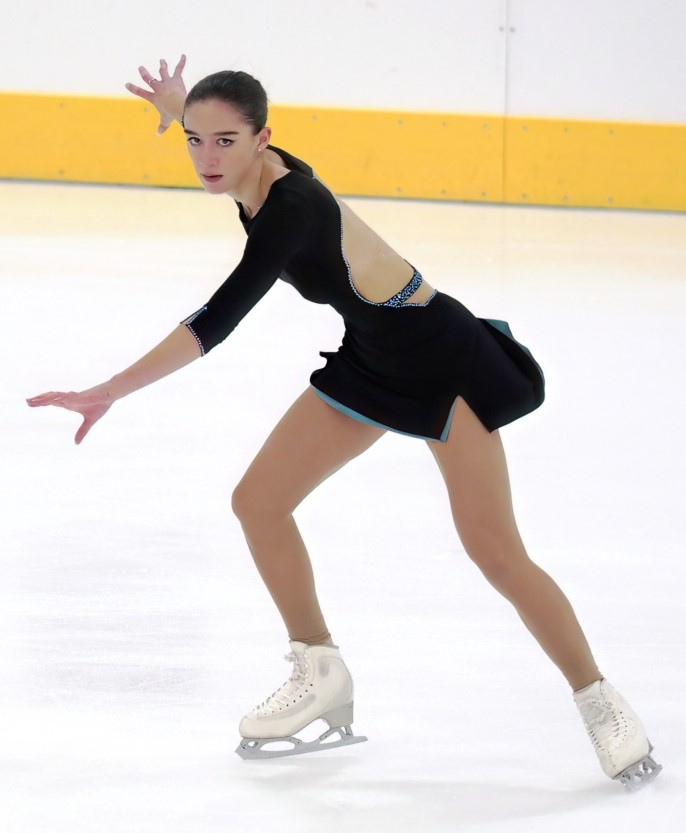
Gutmann performing her free skate at the 2022 CS Lombardia Trophy

In three appearances on the Challenger circuit in the fall, Gutmann finished sixth on home ice at the 2022 CS Lombardia Trophy before winning the silver medal at the 2022 CS Nepela Memorial. She finished the series with a fourth-place at the 2022 CS Golden Spin of Zagreb, and then won her third straight national title.

Assigned to compete at the 2023 European Championships, Gutmann was thirteenth in the short program, but an eighth-place free skate lifted her to eighth overall. This achieved her primary goal of finishing in the top ten and earning a second berth for Italy the following year. Gutmann finished seventeenth at the 2023 World Championships.

Gutmann joined Team Italy for the 2023 World Team Trophy. She finished last in the short program with multiple errors. The free skate was an improvement, coming eighth in the segment. Team Italy finished in fourth place overall.

=== 2023–2024 season ===
While she had previously appeared on the Grand Prix as a host selection, for the 2023–24 Grand Prix Gutmann received her first foreign assignment, the 2023 Skate Canada International. She said it was "very nice to have earned a spot." She began the season by finishing fifth at the 2023 CS Lombardia Trophy. At her second Challenger appearance of the season, she was seventh at the 2023 CS Nepela Memorial. She finished in ninth place at the Skate Canada International. Gutmann was subsequently added to the 2023 Grand Prix of Espoo to replace Kimmy Repond, and placed seventh.

After an eighth-place finish at the 2023 CS Golden Spin of Zagreb, Gutmann won the silver medal at the Italian Championships. She then finished tenth at the 2024 European Championships in Kaunas, Lithuania. She subsequently closed the season by winning silver at the 2024 Dragon Trophy and the 2024 Merano Ice Trophy, as well as a gold medal at the 2024 Sonja Henie Trophy.

=== 2024–2025 season: Grand Prix bronze medal ===
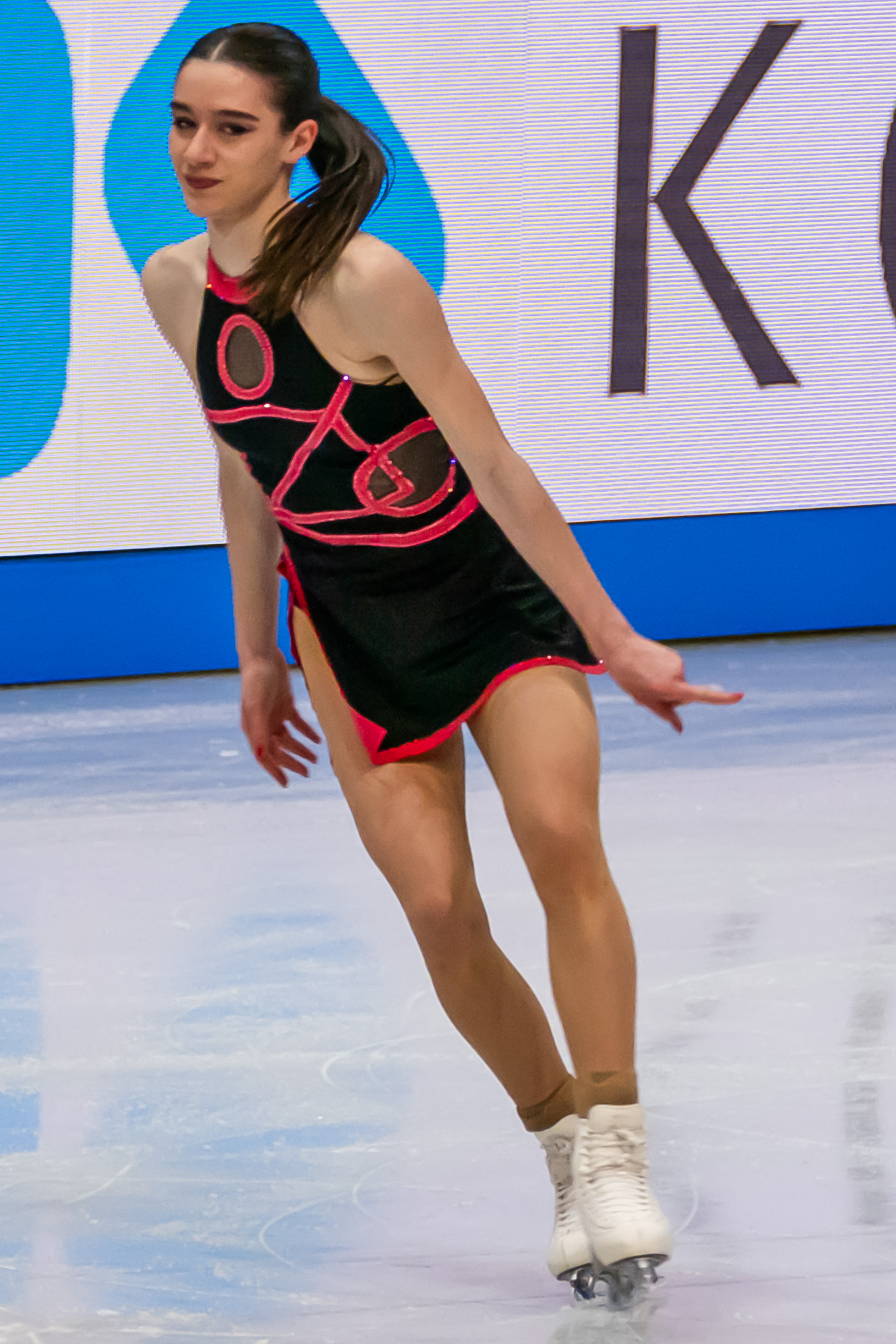
Gutmann performing her short program at the 2025 World Championships

Gutmann began the season by competing on the 2024–25 ISU Challenger Series, finishing a disappointing tenth place at the 2024 CS Lombardia Trophy. She had stronger showings at the 2024 CS Denis Ten Memorial Challenge and the 2024 CS Nepela Memorial, where she won bronze at both events.

Going on to compete on the 2024–25 Grand Prix series, Gutmann finished sixth at the 2024 NHK Trophy. Although she was initially only assigned one Grand Prix event, Gutmann's name was assigned to the 2024 Finlandia Trophy following the withdrawal of Loena Hendrickx. At the event, Gutmann scored personal best scores in all competition segments, placing second in the short program and third in the free skate, securing the bronze medal overall. Gutmann finished only less than a point behind gold medalist Hana Yoshida. She expressed elation at her result, saying, "I am so happy. I was really nervous as this was my first time being in a medal position after the SP and winning a medal at such a big event." She was the only woman singles skater from Europe to medal on the 2024–25 Grand Prix circuit.

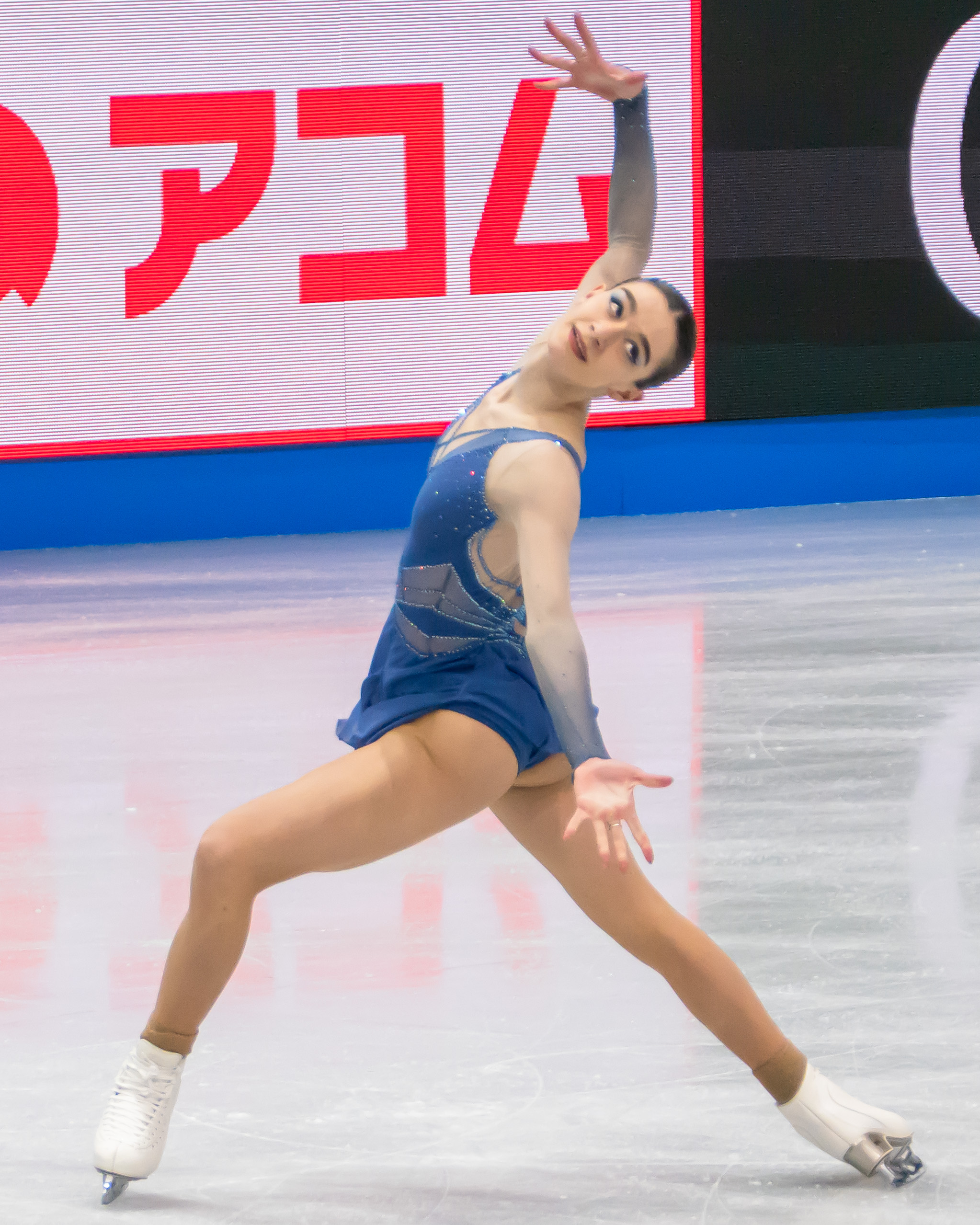
Gutmann performing an Ina Bauer during her free skate at the 2025 World Championships

In December, Gutmann won the silver medal at the 2025 Italian Championships behind Anna Pezzetta. She was selected to compete at the 2025 European Championships in January, where she finished in sixth place, directly behind Pezzetta, after doubling two of her planned triple jumps in the free skate. After the free skate, she said she "needs to work on her physical shape as she is getting tired towards the end of her program." "I need to make sure this doesn’t happen in the next events,” Gutmann said. “This is still my best finish at Europeans, but I need to process the program and what happened so I can analyze it correctly.”

In February, she competed at the Road to 26 Trophy in Milan, which served as a test event for the 2026 Winter Olympics. She was in first place after the short program, but she finished in third place overall to win the bronze medal after the free skate, where she fell on an underrotated triple Lutz jump. A couple weeks later, she won gold at the 2025 Sonia Henie Trophy.

Selected to compete at the 2025 World Championships in Boston, Massachusetts, United States, Gutmann came in thirteenth place after finishing fourteenth in the short program and twelfth in the free skate. A couple weeks later, she competed for Team Italy at the 2025 World Team Trophy, where she scored personal bests in all segments of the women's competition and finished in sixth place overall. With these placements, Team Italy won the bronze medal overall.

=== 2025–2026 season: Milano Cortina Olympic team bronze and European bronze ===
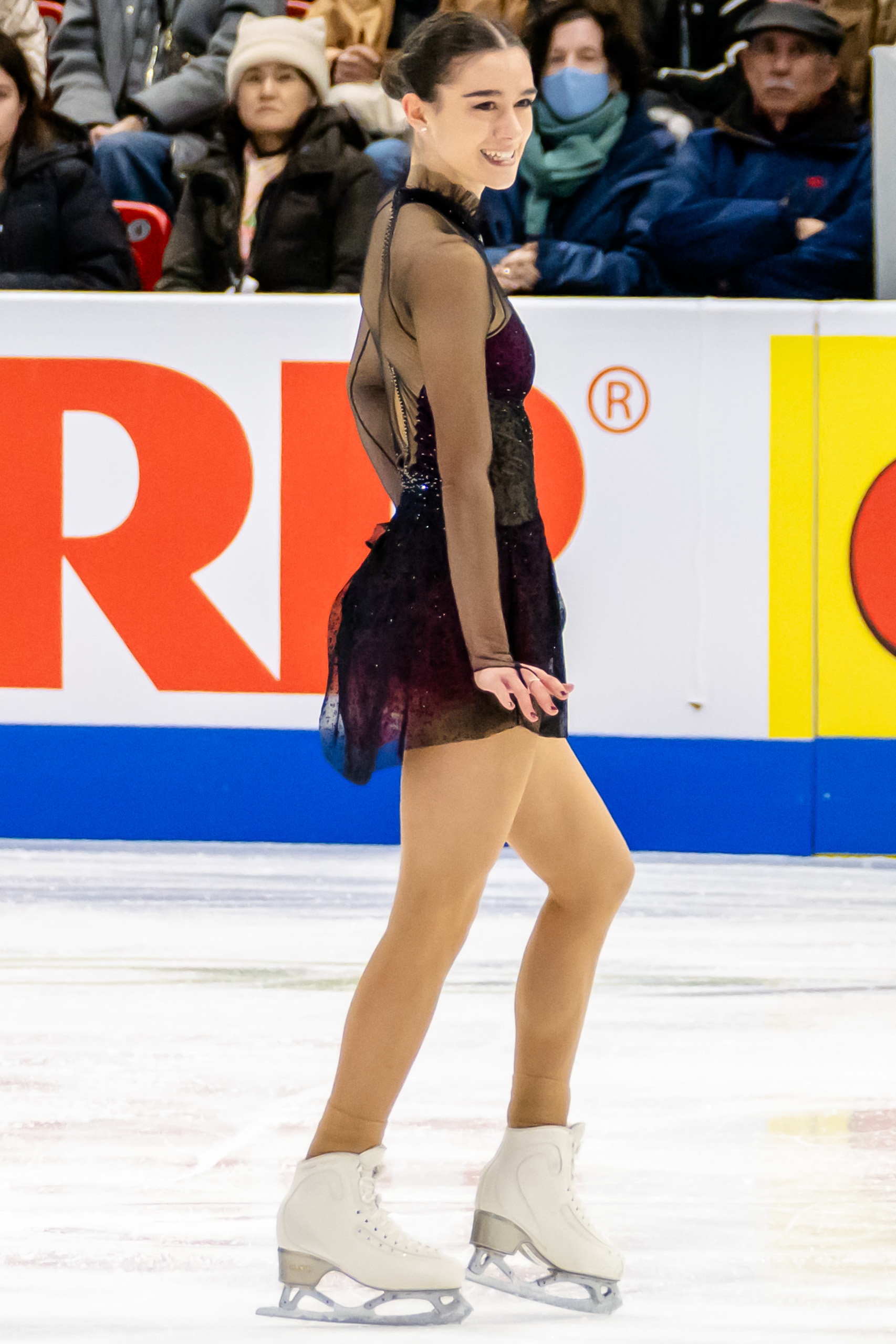
Gutmann performing her short program at the 2025 Skate America

Gutmann opened her season by competing on the 2025–26 ISU Challenger Series, finishing fifth at the 2025 CS Lombardia Trophy and winning gold at the 2025 CS Nepela Memorial. She then went on to compete on 2025–26 Grand Prix circuit, finishing fifth at 2025 Skate Canada International and fourth at 2025 Skate America.

In December, Gutmann competed at the 2026 Italian Championships, winning her fourth national title. Following the event, she was named to the 2026 Winter Olympic team.

The following month, Gutmann won the bronze medal at the 2026 European Championships after placing fourth in both the short program and free skate segments. With this result, she became the first Italian women singles skater to make the podium at a European Championships since Carolina Kostner in 2018. Kostner, herself, attended the event and congratulated Gutmann following her podium placement. "I want to come back stronger at the next competition," said Gutmann. "I really wasn't satisfied, but I was fighting until the end, and I think this is what brought me this medal. Of course, it's a huge honor for me to be the first Italian to win a medal at the Europeans after Carolina Kostner."

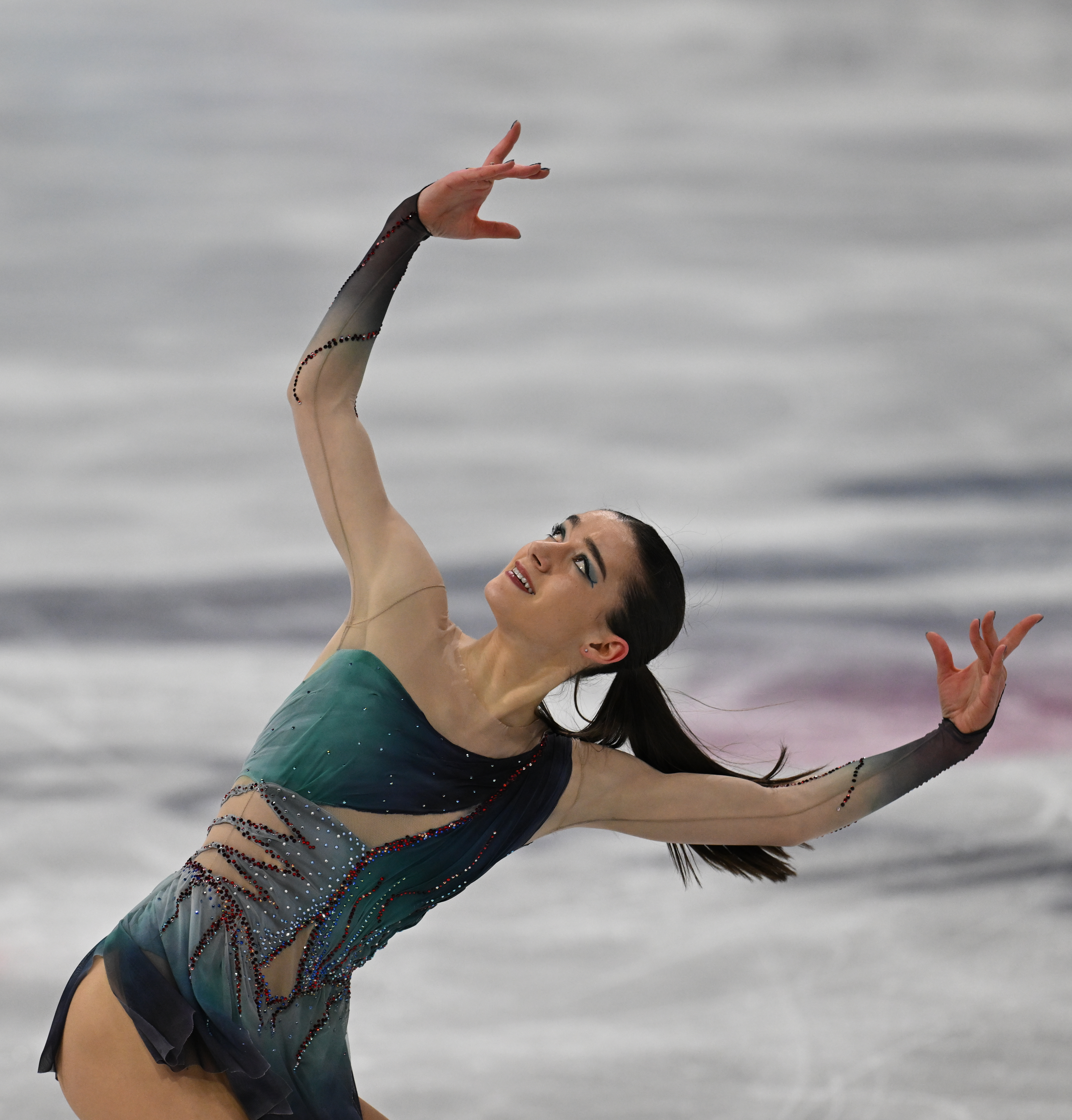
Gutmann performing her free skate at the 2026 Winter Olympics

On 6 February, Gutmann competed in the short program segment of the 2026 Winter Olympics Figure Skating Team Event, placing third and earning a personal best score. "I felt so good, the crowd was amazing, it gave me a lot of strength," said Gutmann after her performance. "It was a little bit like the World Team Trophy in Japan. I had so many great feelings and I wanted to do the best performance I could do for myself, for my team, for Italy in this amazing stadium with my home crowd. So, in the moment, it just felt great." Two days later, Gutmann placed fourth in the free skate segment. Her results, combined with those of her teammates, allowed Team Italy to win the Olympic bronze medal.

On 17 February, Gutmann competed in the Olympic women's singles event. She placed a disappointing eighteenth in the short program after popping her planned triple Lutz into a double, rendering the element as invalid. Two days later, however, she rebounded with a solid free skate, placing twelfth in that segment and moving up to fifteenth place overall. "I am so happy that I could finish these Olympics on a good note. I'm really, really glad," she expressed in an interview following her performance. "I had a headache. This morning and last night I really didn't feel well I had a headache and everything. So I'm very happy and relieved with how the skate went and that I was able to end these Olympics well."

In March, Gutmann competed at the 2026 World Championships in Prague, placing fifth overall. “I’m feeling really good,” said Gutmann after the free skate where she earned a new personal best. “Tired, but really, really good. I’m glad I could skate my ‘Jaws’ program today like this. I also have to say I’m proud of myself, how I handled the whole season. It’s been such a long season. I had to fight for the Olympic spot, and then I had to fight to be here and still be somehow in shape.” This placement secured two quotas for Italian women for the 2027 World Championships. She commented on this accomplishment, “That was important for me, for Italy, and for every one of us, and also for myself because I wanted to have a little bit more peace next season.”

=== 2026–27 season ===
Gutmann opened the new season with a bronze medal at the 2026 CS Lombardia Trophy. Gutmann went onto compete on the 2026–27 Grand Prix series, winning a bronze medal at the 2026 Grand Prix de France. “I think I managed to bring more energy and the same positive mindset today,” she said. “I feel like I’ve found my routine and the right mindset to go for it.”

Two weeks later, Gutmann competed at 2026 Cup of China, placing fifth overall after doubling two triple Lutz jumps. “I felt good, but I’m not satisfied because of the two mistakes, the double Lutz,” Gutmann pointed out. “Everything was going so well until then. Maybe I was just thinking too much. But I think overall, I pulled off a good program, and it was emotional.”

== Programs ==
Season	Short program	Free skating	Exhibition
2026–2027	"One" by Lily Papas & Planet of Souls; "Run Boy Run" (Instrumental) by Woodkid choreo. by Stéphane Lambiel	"Arctic Suite" by Eldbjørg Hemsing, Arctic Philarmonic, Jacob Shea choreo. by Lori Nichol, Carolina Kostner	Quello che le donne non dicono by Arisa
2025–2026	La legge di Lidia Poët; Nulla è risolto; Beatrice; C'è qualcosa che devi dirmi; Nitti by Massimiliano Mechelli arranged by Karl Hugo choreo. by Lori Nichol	Thème principal (from Les dents de la mer) by John Williams performed by City of Prague Philharmonic Orchestra & Paul Bateman; The Wicked Ones by Secession Studios & Greg Dombrowski; The Shark Approaches (from Jaws) by John Williams; Time (from Inception) by Hans Zimmer & Matt Dunkley; Forgotten Sins by Audiomachine & Harry Lightfoot all arranged by Karl Hugo choreo. by Stéphane Lambiel	Squid Game; Tight Rope by Paolo Diotti; Roses of Sharon Have Blossomed; Pink Soldiers by 23; The Rope is Tied by Jung Jae-il; The Fat and the Rats by Park Min-ju; Squid Game (Let's Play) by Alok choreo. by Stéphane Lambiel
2024–2025	Squid Game; Roses of Sharon Have Blossomed; Pink Soldiers by 23; The Rope is Tied; Round I by Jung Jae-il; The Fat and the Rats by Park Min-ju; Squid Game (Let's Play) by Alok choreo. by Stéphane Lambiel	Wayward Sisters (from Nocturnal Animals) by Abel Korzeniowski; The Sheltering Sky by Ryuichi Sakamoto choreo. by Gabriele Minchio, Prisca Picano, Riccardo Morelli	I Dreamed a Dream (from Les Misérables) performed by Susan Boyle
2023–2024	Kiss of Death by Mandingo; Le Serpent by Guem & Zaka; War Dance by Mandingo choreo. by Gabriele Minchio, Prisca Picano	Prelude; Rooftop (from Vertigo) by Bernard Herrmann; End Credit #1 (from Hitchcock) by Danny Elfman; Suite (from Psycho) by Bernard Herrmann choreo. by Gabriele Minchio, Prisca Picano, Riccardo Morelli	What Was I Made For? (from Barbie) by Billie Eilish
2022–2023	Un Año De Amor (from High Heels) by Luz Casal choreo. by Gabriele Minchio, Prisca Picano, Riccardo Morelli	Prelude; Rooftop (from Vertigo) by Bernard Herrmann; End Credit #1 (from Hitchcock) by Danny Elfman; Suite (from Psycho) by Bernard Herrmann choreo. by Gabriele Minchio, Prisca Picano, Riccardo Morelli	
2021–2022	Elizabeth; Maria and the Violin's String by Ashram choreo. by Gabriele Minchio, Prisca Picano, Riccardo Morelli	Scheherezade by Nikolai Rimsky-Korsakov choreo. by Gabriele Minchio, Prisca Picano, Riccardo Morelli	
2020–2021	The Sheltering Sky by Ryuichi Sakamoto choreo. by Gabriele Minchio, Prisca Picano, Riccardo Morelli	Scheherezade by Nikolai Rimsky-Korsakov choreo. by Gabriele Minchio, Prisca Picano, Riccardo Morelli	
2019–2020	The Sheltering Sky by Ryuichi Sakamoto choreo. by Gabriele Minchio, Prisca Picano, Riccardo Morelli	The Mission by Ennio Morricone choreo. by Gabriele Minchio, Prisca Picano, Riccardo Morelli	
2018–2019	Mary Poppins (from Saving Mr. Banks) by Thomas Newman choreo. by Gabriele Minchio, Prisca Picano, Riccardo Morelli	The Storm by Balázs Havasi choreo. by Gabriele Minchio, Prisca Picano, Riccardo Morelli	
2017–2018	Mary Poppins (from Saving Mr. Banks) by Thomas Newman choreo. by Gabriele Minchio, Prisca Picano, Riccardo Morelli	Careless Whisper; A Different Corner by George Michael choreo. by Gabriele Minchio, Prisca Picano, Riccardo Morelli	
2016–2017	Where Have All the Flowers Gone? by Pete Seeger	Danse macabre by Camille Saint-Saëns	
2015–2016	Dark Night of the Soul by Loreena McKennitt	I Dreamed a Dream (from Les Misérables) by Claude-Michel Schönberg	
2014–2015	River Flows in You by Yiruma	East of Eden by Lee Holdridge	

== Competitive highlights ==
- GP – Event of the ISU Grand Prix Series
- JGP – Event of the ISU Junior Grand Prix Series
- CS – Event of the ISU Challenger Series
- TBD – Assigned
- WD – Withdrew from competition
- Medals at team events are awarded for the team results only. Individual placements at team events are listed in parentheses.

Competition placements at senior level
Season	2018–19	2019–20	2020–21	2021–22	2022–23	2023–24	2024–25	2025–26	2026-27
Winter Olympics								15th	
Winter Olympics (Team event)				7th (9th)				3rd	
World Championships			28th	20th	17th		13th	5th	
European Championships	29th			15th	8th	10th	6th	3rd	
Italian Championships	3rd	3rd	1st	1st	1st	2nd	2nd	1st	
World Team Trophy			4th (7th)		4th (10th)		3rd (6th)		
GP Cup of China									5th
GP Finland						7th	3rd		
GP France									3rd
GP Italy				11th					
GP NHK Trophy							6th		
GP Skate America								4th	
GP Skate Canada						9th		5th	
CS Denis Ten Memorial							3rd		
CS Golden Spin of Zagreb		6th			4th	8th			
CS Lombardia Trophy				5th	6th	5th	10th	5th	3rd
CS Nebelhorn Trophy				8th					
CS Nepela Memorial		4th			2nd	7th	3rd	1st	
CS Tallinn Trophy									1st
Bosphorus Cup	2nd								
Challenge Cup					7th				
Crystal Skate of Romania					1st				
Cup of Tyrol	8th								
Dragon Trophy		2nd			1st	2nd			
Egna Spring Trophy	7th								
Mentor Toruń Cup	5th								
Merano Ice Trophy						2nd			
Nordic Championships		1st							
Road to 26 Trophy							3rd		
Sonja Henje Trophy						1st	1st		
Tallink Hotels Cup				2nd					
Volvo Open Cup		5th							
Winter University Games							5th		
Bavarian Open	10th								

Competition placements at junior level
Season	2015–16	2016–17	2017–18	2018–19	2019–20
Italian Championships	3rd	3rd	2nd		
JGP Austria				19th	
JGP France					6th
JGP Italy			13th		7th
Bavarian Open		8th			
Coupe du Printemps			4th		
Cup of Tyrol		7th			
Dragon Trophy			3rd		
Egna Spring Trophy		4th			
Halloween Cup			2nd		
Lombardia Trophy		3rd			
Merano Cup		15th	5th		
NRW Trophy		10th			
Tallinn Trophy			7th		
Triglav Trophy			2nd		

== Detailed results ==
ISU personal best scores in the +5/-5 GOE System
Segment	Type	Score	Event
Total	TSS	205.12	2026 World Championships
Short program	TSS	71.76	2026 Cup of China
Short program	TES	39.68	2026 CS Lombardia Trophy
Short program	PCS	33.34	2026 Winter Olympics (Team event)
Free skating	TSS	137.01	2026 Grand Prix de France
Free skating	TES	71.58	2025 CS Nepela Memorial
Free skating	PCS	66.93	2026 World Championships

- Medals at team events are awarded for the team results only. Individual placements at team events are listed in parentheses.

=== Senior level ===
Results in the 2019–20 season
Date	Event	SP		FS		Total	
Date	Event	P	Score	P	Score	P	Score
Nov 27 – Dec 1, 2018	(Turkey) 2018 Bosphorus Cup	1	53.98	2	96.39	2	150.37
Dec 13–16, 2018	(Italy) 2019 Italian Championships	3	55.37	2	101.17	3	156.54
Jan 8–13, 2019	(Poland) 2019 Mentor Toruń Cup	5	50.09	5	89.72	5	139.81
Jan 21–27, 2019	(Belarus) 2019 European Championships	29	43.96	—N/a	—N/a	29	43.96
Feb 5–10, 2019	(Germany) 2019 Bavarian Open	13	46.18	9	87.47	10	133.65
Feb 26 – Mar 3, 2019	(Austria) 2019 Cup of Tyrol	6	49.27	7	94.63	8	143.90
Mar 28–31, 2019	(Italy) 2019 Egna Spring Trophy	9	48.81	7	91.63	7	140.44

Results in the 2019–20 season
Date	Event	SP		FS		Total	
Date	Event	P	Score	P	Score	P	Score
Sep 19–21, 2019	(Slovakia) 2019 CS Nepela Memorial	3	62.41	5	115.71	4	178.12
Nov 5–10, 2019	(Latvia) 2019 40th Volvo Open Cup	5	55.13	5	97.73	5	152.86
Dec 4–7, 2019	(Croatia) 2019 CS Golden Spin of Zagreb	7	56.81	7	110.79	6	167.60
Dec 12–15, 2019	(Italy) 2020 Italian Championships	4	59.02	3	112.36	3	171.38
Jan 30 – Feb 2, 2020	(Slovenia) 2020 Dragon Trophy	1	58.86	2	104.20	2	163.06
Feb 5–9, 2020	(Norway) 2020 Nordic Championships	2	62.81	2	116.18	1	179.01

Results in the 2020–21 season
Date	Event	SP		FS		Total	
Date	Event	P	Score	P	Score	P	Score
Dec 12–13, 2020	(Italy) 2021 Italian Championships	1	63.08	1	115.07	1	178.15
Mar 22–28, 2021	(Sweden) 2021 World Championships	28	55.64	—N/a	—N/a	28	55.64
Apr 15–18, 2021	(Japan) 2021 World Team Trophy	7	60.45	7	119.14	4 (7)	179.59

Results in the 2021–22 season
Date	Event	SP		FS		Total	
Date	Event	P	Score	P	Score	P	Score
Sep 10–12, 2021	(Italy) 2021 CS Lombardia Trophy	18	48.65	3	118.33	5	166.98
Sep 22–25, 2021	(Germany) 2021 CS Nebelhorn Trophy	7	57.16	7	107.44	8	164.60
Nov 5–7, 2021	(Italy) 2021 Gran Premio d'Italia	11	54.83	11	103.74	11	158.57
Dec 4–5, 2021	(Italy) 2022 Italian Championships	1	63.43	1	124.00	1	187.43
Jan 10–16, 2022	(Estonia) 2022 European Championships	23	52.94	12	111.05	16	163.99
Feb 4–7, 2022	(China) 2022 Winter Olympics (Team event)	9	58.52	—N/a	—N/a	7	—N/a
Mar 4–6, 2022	(Estonia) 2022 Tallink Hotels Cup	1	60.64	3	103.04	2	163.68
Mar 21–27, 2022	(France) 2022 World Championships	20	57.92	20	106.47	20	164.39

Results in the 2022–23 season
Date	Event	SP		FS		Total	
Date	Event	P	Score	P	Score	P	Score
Sep 16–19, 2022	(Italy) 2022 CS Lombardia Trophy	7	56.46	6	111.93	6	168.39
Sep 29 – Oct 1, 2022	(Slovakia) 2022 CS Nepela Memorial	4	52.65	2	113.59	2	166.24
Oct 26–30, 2022	2022 Crystal Skate of Romania	1	56.39	1	117.74	1	174.13
Dec 7–10, 2022	(Croatia) 2022 CS Golden Spin of Zagreb	9	50.06	2	125.65	4	175.71
Dec 15–18, 2022	(Italy) 2023 Italian Championships	2	62.36	1	127.52	1	189.88
Jan 25–29, 2023	(Finland) 2023 European Championships	13	55.39	8	113.90	8	169.29
Feb 9–12, 2023	(Slovenia) 2023 Dragon Trophy	1	62.63	1	118.26	1	180.89
Feb 23–26, 2023	(Netherlands) 2023 International Challenge Cup	10	55.87	7	115.88	7	171.71
Mar 22–26, 2023	(Japan) 2023 World Championships	23	55.22	13	123.21	17	178.43
Apr 13–16, 2023	(Japan) 2023 World Team Trophy	12	51.12	8	116.83	4 (10)	167.95

Results in the 2023–24 season
Date	Event	SP		FS		Total	
Date	Event	P	Score	P	Score	P	Score
Sep 8–10, 2023	(Italy) 2023 CS Lombardia Trophy	8	53.96	5	109.46	5	163.42
Sep 28–30, 2023	(Slovakia) 2023 CS Nepela Memorial	7	52.78	7	104.95	7	157.73
Oct 27–29, 2023	2023 Skate Canada International	11	50.00	7	115.73	9	165.73
Nov 17–19, 2023	(Finland) 2023 Grand Prix of Espoo	7	58.24	8	110.09	7	168.33
Dec 6–9, 2023	(Croatia) 2023 CS Golden Spin of Zagreb	11	50.60	7	104.58	8	155.18
Dec 22–23, 2023	(Italy) 2024 Italian Championships	7	53.84	1	130.04	2	183.88
Jan 10–14, 2024	(Lithuania) 2024 European Championships	16	55.68	8	110.33	10	166.01
Feb 7–9, 2024	(Slovenia) 2024 Dragon Trophy	5	54.68	1	115.70	2	170.56
Feb 23–25, 2024	(Italy) 2024 Merano Ice Trophy	3	56.78	2	116.44	2	173.22
Mar 8–10, 2024	(Norway) 2024 Sonja Henje Trophy	1	60.82	1	120.82	1	181.64

Results in the 2024–25 season
Date	Event	SP		FS		Total	
Date	Event	P	Score	P	Score	P	Score
Sep 13–15, 2024	(Italy) 2024 CS Lombardia Trophy	4	61.21	1	127.65	3	188.86
Oct 24–26, 2024	(Czech Republic) 2024 CS Nepela Memorial	2	57.67	3	114.48	3	172.15
Nov 8–10, 2024	(Japan) 2024 NHK Trophy	6	61.51	6	118.77	6	180.28
Nov 15–17, 2024	(Finland) 2024 Finlandia Trophy	2	67.06	3	131.43	3	198.49
Dec 19–21, 2024	(Italy) 2025 Italian Championships	1	63.29	2	117.63	2	180.92
Jan 16–18, 2025	(Italy) 2025 Winter World University Games	4	61.31	7	107.94	5	169.25
Jan 28 – Feb 2, 2025	(Estonia) 2025 European Championships	5	63.79	6	117.72	6	181.51
Feb 18–20, 2025	(Italy) Road to 26 Trophy	1	67.61	5	120.58	3	188.19
Mar 6–9, 2025	(Norway) 2025 Sonja Henje Trophy	2	58.39	1	118.94	1	177.33
Mar 25–30, 2025	(United States) 2025 World Championships	14	61.72	12	120.25	13	181.97
Apr 17–20, 2025	(Japan) 2025 World Team Trophy	5	68.43	6	133.13	3	201.56

Results in the 2025–26 season
Date	Event	SP		FS		Total	
Date	Event	P	Score	P	Score	P	Score
Sep 11–14, 2025	(Italy) 2025 CS Lombardia Trophy	6	67.70	4	128.25	5	195.95
Sep 25–27, 2025	(Slovakia) 2025 CS Nepela Memorial	1	67.25	1	135.26	1	202.51
Oct 31 – Nov 2, 2025	2025 Skate Canada International	3	68.11	5	123.94	5	192.05
Nov 14–16, 2025	(United States) 2025 Skate America	3	69.69	4	134.60	4	204.29
Dec 17–20, 2025	(Italy) 2026 Italian Championships	1	64.32	1	136.29	1	200.61
Jan 13–18, 2026	(United Kingdom) 2026 European Championships	4	63.75	4	123.12	3	186.87
Feb 6–8, 2026	(Italy) 2026 Winter Olympics – Team event	3	71.62	4	126.94	3	—N/a
Feb 17–19, 2026	(Italy) 2026 Winter Olympics	18	61.56	12	134.19	15	195.75
Mar 24–29, 2026	(Czech Republic) 2026 World Championships	7	69.33	5	135.79	5	205.12

Results in the 2026–27 season
Date	Event	SP		FS		Total	
Date	Event	P	Score	P	Score	P	Score
Sep 17–20, 2026	(Italy) 2026 CS Lombardia Trophy	3	70.60	3	132.14	3	202.74
Oct 23-25, 2026	2026 Grand Prix de France	5	65.36	2	137.01	3	202.37
Nov 6–8, 2026	2026 Cup of China	4	71.76	5	130.93	5	202.69
Nov 16–22, 2026	(Estonia) 2026 CS Tallinn Trophy	1	70.25	1	134.60	1	204.85

=== Junior level ===
Results in the 2015–16 season
Date	Event	SP		FS		Total	
Date	Event	P	Score	P	Score	P	Score
Dec 16–19, 2015	(Italy) 2016 Italian Championships (Junior)	5	40.89	3	79.86	3	120.75

Results in the 2016–17 season
Date	Event	SP		FS		Total	
Date	Event	P	Score	P	Score	P	Score
Sep 8–11, 2016	(Italy) 2016 Lombardia Trophy	5	40.48	3	82.02	3	122.50
Nov 10–13, 2016	(Italy) 2016 Merano Cup	14	36.07	12	65.26	15	101.33
Nov 30 – Dec 4, 2016	(Germany) 2016 NRW Trophy	10	44.21	12	77.23	10	121.44
Dec 14–17, 2016	(Italy) 2017 Italian Championships (Junior)	3	48.66	2	101.99	3	150.65
Feb 14–19, 2017	(Germany) 2016 Bavarian Open	9	41.08	8	75.18	8	116.26
Feb 28 – Mar 5, 2017	(Austria) 2017 Cup of Tyrol	7	42.77	7	75.59	7	118.36
Apr 6–9, 2017	(Italy) 2017 Egna Spring Trophy	4	44.50	3	82.56	4	127.06

Results in the 2017–18 season
Date	Event	SP		FS		Total	
Date	Event	P	Score	P	Score	P	Score
Oct 11–14, 2017	2017 JGP Italy	13	48.37	13	82.24	13	130.61
Oct 21–23, 2017	(Hungary) 2017 Halloween Cup	3	41.44	1	80.34	2	121.78
Nov 15–19, 2017	(Italy) 2017 Merano Cup	3	46.68	5	80.57	5	127.25
Nov 20–26, 2017	(Estonia) 2017 Tallinn Trophy	12	40.98	6	89.41	7	130.39
Dec 13–16, 2017	(Italy) 2018 Italian Championships (Junior)	2	56.41	3	93.34	2	149.75
Feb 8–11, 2018	(Slovenia) 2018 Dragon Trophy	1	48.79	4	83.75	3	132.54
Mar 16–18, 2018	(Luxembourg) 2018 Coupe du Printemps	6	45.69	3	86.75	4	132.44
Apr 4–6, 2018	(Slovenia) 2018 Triglav Trophy	2	49.04	2	96.21	2	145.25

Results in the 2018–19 season
Date	Event	SP		FS		Total	
Date	Event	P	Score	P	Score	P	Score
Aug 29 – Sep 1, 2018	2018 JGP Austria	10	45.75	21	60.64	19	106.39

Results in the 2019–20 season
Date	Event	SP		FS		Total	
Date	Event	P	Score	P	Score	P	Score
Aug 21–24, 2019	2019 JGP France	5	58.24	6	105.99	6	164.23
Oct 2–5, 2019	2019 JGP Italy	6	57.32	7	98.96	7	156.28
