= Luz =

Luz may refer to:

== People and fictional characters ==
- Luz (name), including a list of people and fictional characters with the given name, nickname or surname, including Spanish and Portuguese
- Luz (cartoonist), pen name of French cartoonist Rénald Luzier (born 1972)
- Luz Casal (born 1958), Spanish singer also known mononymously as Luz
- Luz (singer, born 1993) (1993–2025), Japanese singer
- Luz (The Owl House) main character of series.

== Places ==
- Luz (biblical place), either of two cities mentioned in the Bible
- Luz, Minas Gerais, Brazil, a municipality
  - Roman Catholic Diocese of Luz, in the city of Luz in the ecclesiastical province of Belo Horizonte
- Luz (Santa Cruz da Graciosa), Portugal, a civil parish in the Azores
- Luz, a parish of Mourão, Alentejo, Portugal
- Luž, Czech for Lausche, a mountain in the German state of Saxony
- Our Lady of Light Church, Chennai, known as Luz Church

== Arts and entertainment ==
- Luz (Djavan album), 1982
- Luz (Luz Casal album), 1982
- Luz (Cuca Roseta album), 2017
- Luz (No Te Va Gustar album), 2021
- Luz (2018 film), a German horror film
- Luz (2019 film), a Colombian drama film
- Luz (2020 film), an American LGBT romantic drama film
- "Luz", a 2022 song by Fede Vigevani

== Transportation ==
- Luz Station, a railway station in São Paulo, Brazil
- Luz (São Paulo Metro), a metro station in São Paulo
- Luz (CPTM), a commuter rail and intercity rail station in São Paulo
- LUZ, IATA airport code for Lublin Airport, Poland

== Other uses ==
- Luz (bone), a bone in the spinal column
- Luz (missile), the first missile built in Israel
- Luz (nut), the Aramaic and Arabic name for almond
- BrightSource Energy, formerly Luz II Ltd
- Larger urban zone, or LUZ, a measure of population and expanse of metropolitan areas in Europe
- University of Zulia, known as LUZ, in Venezuela
- luz, ISO 639-3 code for Southern Luri

== See also ==
- La Luz (disambiguation)
- De Luz (disambiguation)
- Luz i Madh, Albania
- Luz i Vogël, Albania
- Palácio da Luz, former head office of the government of Ceará state, Brazil
