= Como la flor prometida =

Como la flor prometida (Like the promised flower)

Studio album by Luz Casal
- Released: 1995
- Studio: Madrid, London
- Genre: Rock; hard rock; pop rock; Rock en español; Ballad; Bolero; Celtic music
- Length: 60:20
- Label: Hispavox
- Producer: Chucho Merchán; Paco Trinidad; Luz Casal; Albert Hammond; Carlos Goñi; Carlos Núñez; Carmen Santoja; Gloria van Aerssen

Luz Casal chronology
A contraluz (1991)	Como la flor prometida (Like the promised flower) (1995)	Un mar de confianza (1999)

Singles from Como la flor prometida (Like the promised flower)
- 1. "Entre mis recuerdos" Released: 1995; 2. "Besaré el suelo" Released: 1995; 3. "Lo eres todo" Released: 1995; 4. "Te ofrezco lo que tengo" Released: 1995; 5. "Plantado en mi cabeza" Released: 1996

Como la flor prometida (Like the promised flower) is the seventh studio album of the Spanish singer-songwriter Luz Casal, released in 1995 after a four-year hiatus due to the unexpected success of A Contraluz, her previous album. After thinking about her career, the performer returned to the recording studios in Madrid and London and apart from counting with the production of Chucho Merchán and Paco Trinidad, she also started collaborating with other artists such as Albert Hammond and Carlos Goñi, lead member of the band Revolver amongst others.

== Style ==
This album follows the direction started by A Contraluz with a special protagonism of ballads and low tempo songs except from some of her traditional rock tracks. As in her two previous releases, four Maxi singles were extracted from the album. The first one and also the most successful was "Entre mis recuerdos" (Between my memories), a nostalgic ballad composed by the British singer Albert Hammond which talks about the remembrance of childhood happy memories when sadness comes. This track, which was dedicated to Casal's dying father was by far the most remembered tracks of the album, to the point that it reached the first place in Los 40 principales chart in summer 1995. The success of this song was so great that also reached the neighbouring France and Portugal, to the point that the singer recorded a Portuguese and French version of this song. The French version, entitled "Entre mes souvenirs" was three years later, in 1998, included in a compilation album released exclusively in France.

"Besaré el suelo" (I'll kiss the ground) was chosen as the second single from this album. This rock ballad, which talks about an endless fight for love after many sentimental disappointments was composed by the renowned Carlos Goñi, the lead member of the band Revolver. The track was also very well received in the Spanish music charts and also well remembered by Casal's admirers.

The next Maxi single from this album was the song "Lo eres todo" (You are everything) a song composed by Carmen Santonja and by Gloria van Aerssen (the members of the band Vainica Doble). This song is a desperate love song that was arranged only with orchestral sounds, with nor guitars nor drums.

The following single, entitled as "Te ofrezco lo que tengo" (I offer you what I have), a song that was released as a maxi single solely in Spain, the only country where this song was aired. This track is a rock ballad about offering friendship and support when difficult times lie ahead in order to overcome them. Finally the fifth and last single was "Plantado en mi cabeza" (Stuck in my head) an up-tempo cheerful song that resembles Casal's first releases during the 1980s. This single was accompanied with a colorful promotional video inspired in Marvel comics.

Apart from the most famous songs of this album, this release features other worth of note songs such as "Vengo del norte" (I come from the north), in which Luz Casal collaborated with the internationally recognised bagpipe player Carlos Núñez. In this track, Casal shows her Galician roots by including Celtic sounds and references about the sea, the northern winds and the fishing boats.

== Track listing ==
No.	Title	Length
1.	"Flor prometida (Promised flower)"	03:20
2.	"Capítulo acabado (Finished chapter)"	03:37
3.	"Entre mis recuerdos (Between my memories)"	03:37
4.	"Lo eres todo (You are everything)"	03:46
5.	"Como la lluvia al sol (Just like rain knows the sun)"	02:57
6.	"Besaré el suelo (I'll kiss the ground)"	05:13
7.	"Vengo del norte (I come from the north)"	03:31
8.	"País (Country)"	04:28
9.	"Inés"	03:50
10.	"Plantado en mi cabeza (Stuck in my head)"	04:38
11.	"Te ofrezco lo que tengo (I offer you what I have)"	05:14
12.	"Dormir (To sleep)"	08:27

== Reception ==
With 800.000 copies sold, this is the best selling album of Luz Casal. Despite the four-year hiatus the singer took the album generated a huge critical and commercial interest both in Spain, Latin America and other countries such as France, where she would also develop a successful career.
