= Quiéreme aunque te duela =

Quiéreme aunque te duela (Love me eve if it hurts you)

Studio album by Luz Casal
- Released: 1987
- Studio: Madrid, Brussels, Bonn,
- Genre: Rock; hard rock; pop rock; Rock en español
- Length: 50:20
- Label: Zafiro
- Producer: Carlos Narea; Roque Narvaja; Luz Casal; Hilario Camacho; Chucho Merchán

Luz Casal chronology
Luz III (1985)	Quiéreme aunque te duela (Love me eve if it hurts you) (1987)	Luz V (1989)

Singles from Quiéreme aunque te duela
- 1. "Quiéreme aunque te duela" Released: 1987; 2. "Un día marrón" Released: 1987; 3. "Que rabia" Released: 1987; 4. "A cada paso" Released: 1988

Quiéreme aunque te duela (Love me even if it hurts you) is the fourth studio album by Spanish female rock singer-songwriter Luz Casal, which was released in 1987, two years after her successful previous release. This is the last album of Luz Casal produced by Carlos Narea and also her last release under Zafiro, her record label. As usual, the singer wrote most of the songs with the collaboration of her executive producer and other artists such as the Colombian musician Chucho Merchán. Unlike in the previous albums in which the performer used to release three Maxi singles, in this one four singles were released.

== Style ==
Luz Casal in this album kept on showing her more mature and more adult side reassuring her personal style. She started combining her usual Rock to hard rock tunes with more expressive vocals and lyrics. Some critics say that in this album, Casal started showing something that nobody else does, for instance, the feelings of passion and hurtful love that are expressed in a sweet but at the same time direct way. That's the case of "Quiéreme aunque te duela", the title track, which was released as the first single of the album. The next Maxi single was "Un día marrón" (A brown day), which is a song that had nothing to do with what she had previously recorded, in fact, this song, which talks about emotional depression, had no durums nor guitars, only orchestral arrangements. The third maxi single from this album was "¡Que rabia!" (How disgusting!), which is one of the most hard and intense songs from this release with powerful drums and guitars. Another successful single was "A cada paso" (On every step) which was much more successful in some countries in Latin America than in Spain.

The album also features some ballads such as "Mientras tanto empieza a llover" (In the meantime it has started raining outside), the ending track, which are worth of note, but still far away from the quality of the ballads of her future releases.

The singer admitted in an interview to RTVE that she was very pleased with the album because she had worked much more on it than on her previous records.

== Track listing ==
No.	Title	Length
1.	"Quiéreme aunque te duela (Love me even if it hurts you)"	04:10
2.	"¡Que rabia! (How disgusting)"	03:55
3.	"El orangután (The orangutan)"	03:40
4.	"Lejos de ti (Far away from you)"	03:48
5.	"Me tiran de las manos (They are pulling my hands)"	03:39
6.	"Un día marrón (A brown day)"	05:25
7.	"A cada paso (On every step)"	04:40
8.	"444 De lejos (444 far away)"	04:52
9.	"Mientras tanto afuera empieza a llover (In the meantime it has started raining outside)"	04:41

== Reception ==
Quiéreme aunque te duela repeated the figure of 200.000 copies sold of her previous album. After the release of the record, Luz Casal started a tour in Spain, but also in some Latin American countries such as Mexico and Venezuela.
