= Colégio Militar =

Military high school in Lisbon, Portugal

Military College
- Colégio Militar
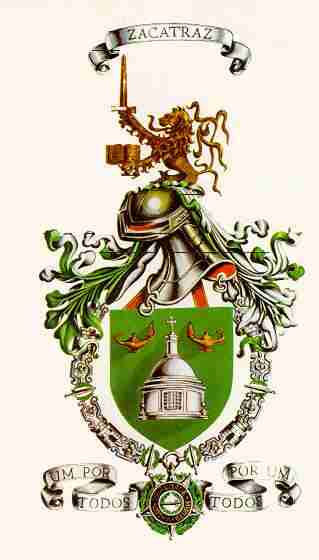
- Motto: Um por todos e todos por um
- Motto in English: One for all and all for one
- Type: Military academy
- Established: 1803; 223 years ago
- Location: Lisbon, Portugal; 38.7600116°N 9.1858982°W
- Website: Official website

The Colégio Militar (Portuguese for "Military College") is a military secondary school in Lisbon, Portugal. It was founded by Marechal António Teixeira Rebello in 1803.

== History ==
Its initial location was S. Julião da Barra Fort, in Oeiras. It moved the first time to a former hospital-convent in Luz in 1814 – during its first years it moved two more times before finally resettling in Luz in 1859.

Initially intended to shelter the sons of military officers stationed abroad to fight the French armies and turn them into army officers, it endured through the French Invasions until the present. It is the oldest educational institution of Portugal after the Universidade de Coimbra and the most decorated military institution in Portugal.

Colégio Militar has been through many regime changes, revolutions, and wars, providing a military education for thousands of youngsters who join at the age of ten and finish just before entering the university or military academies. It is distinctive in its educational method, in which the elder students are ranked and put in command of the younger, perpetuating ancient traditions that keep a bond in the student corps (that often lasts throughout their lives).

== Academic program ==
Teaching is led by a mixed staff of military and civilian teachers. There is a high sports component in the curriculum which includes, among others, fencing, horse riding, competition gymnastics, and shooting.

== Alumni ==
Many of its former students have influenced the development of the Portuguese society since the mid-19th century, such as five presidents of the Portuguese Republic (Field Marshals Gomes da Costa, Óscar Carmona, Craveiro Lopes, António de Spínola and Costa Gomes), prominent military men such as Morais Sarmento and Óscar Monteiro Torres, writers such as Manuel Pinheiro Chagas and Júlio Dantas, explorers like Serpa Pinto and Henrique Carvalho, artists, musicians and actors such as Tomás Alcaide, Raúl de Carvalho, Artur Semedo, Raúl Ferrão and Luís Esparteiro, politicians such as António Sérgio, Humberto Delgado and Tito Morais and many others. About 15,000 students have graduated from Colégio Militar.

Its anniversary is celebrated on 3 March with a parade descending "Avenida da Liberdade", Lisbon's main avenue. Former students can be seen shouting their war cry "Zacatraz" – these can also be recognised by the use of the informal symbol, the "Barretina", on their lapels.

The Portuguese Colégio Militar gave birth to a net of twelve military schools in Brazil (Porto Alegre, Santa Maria, Curitiba, Rio de Janeiro, Belo Horizonte, Juíz de Fora, Salvador, Recife, Fortaleza, Manaus, Brasília and Campo Grande) built in cooperation with the Portuguese experience of a centenary school with high levels of success.

== List of alumni ==
This is a list of alumni with their own articles:

- Francisco Adolfo de Varnhagen, Viscount of Porto Seguro (1816–1878), Brazilian diplomat and historian
- Alexandre de Serpa Pinto (1846–1900), Army Colonel, explorer, and colonial administrator
- Gomes da Costa (1863–1929), Army Marshal and President of Portugal
- Alfredo de Sá Cardoso (1864–1950), Army General and Prime-Minister of Portugal
- Júlio Dantas (1876–1962), doctor, poet, journalist, politician, diplomat, and dramatist
- Francisco Craveiro Lopes (1894–1964), Air Force Marshal and President of Portugal
- Humberto Delgado (1906–1965), Air Force General and presidential candidate
- António de Spínola (1910–1996), Army Marshal and President of Portugal
- Adriano Moreira (1922–2022), university professor, ministry of the Overseas and politician

== Uniforms ==
The dress uniform of the Colégio Militar is in the distinctive maroon/brown colour worn by various regiments of the Portuguese Army since the end of the 18th century. Examples are shown below. The service and field uniforms worn by cadets are of the universal army pattern.

== Gallery ==
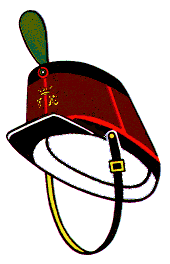
The Barretina (shako), famous symbol of the Colégio Militar

Students in dress uniform

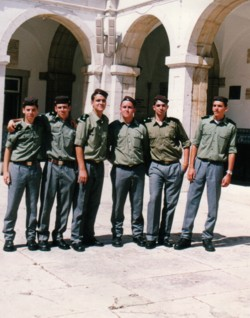
Students in service dress

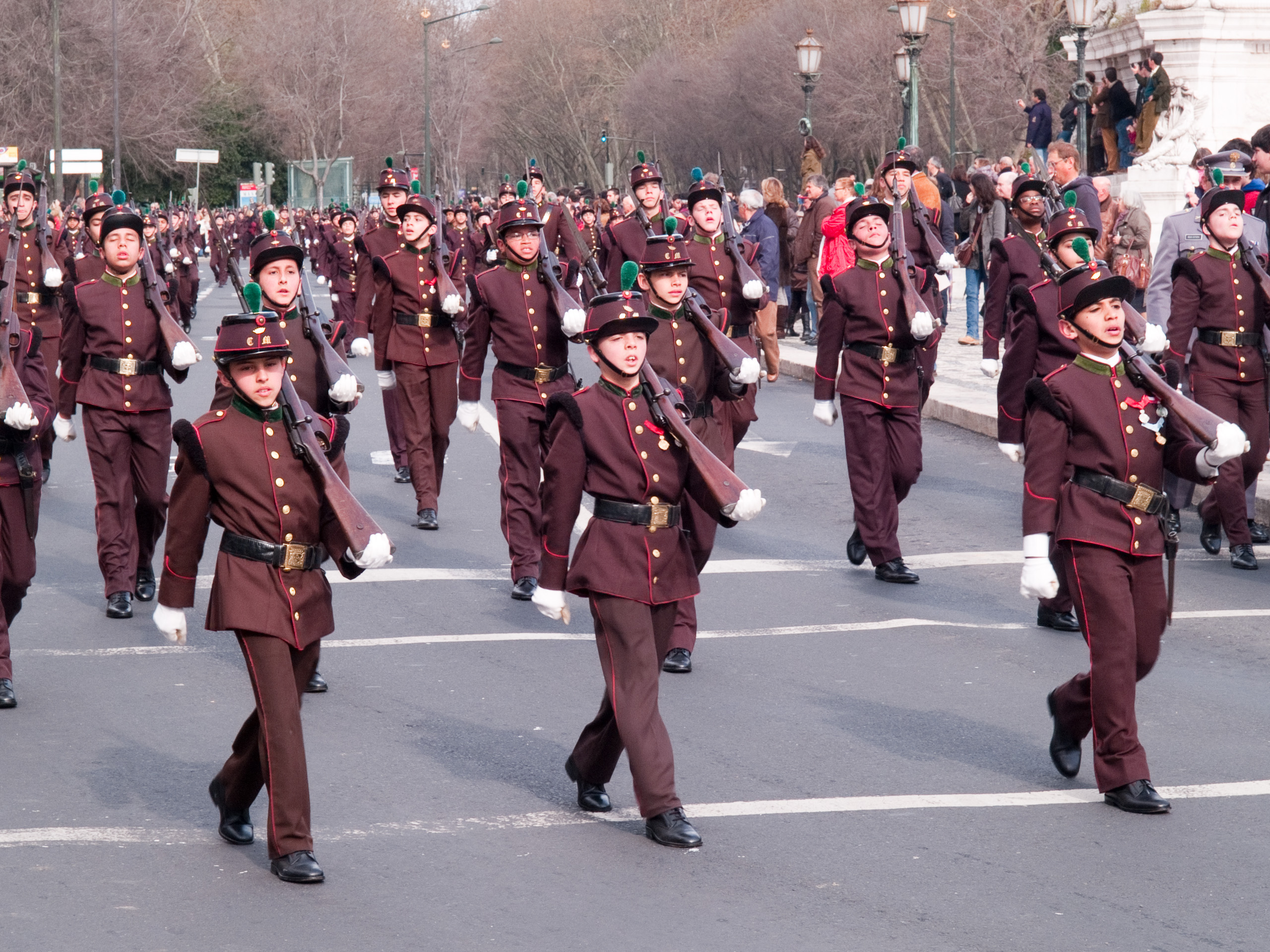
Students' battalion parade at Lisbon

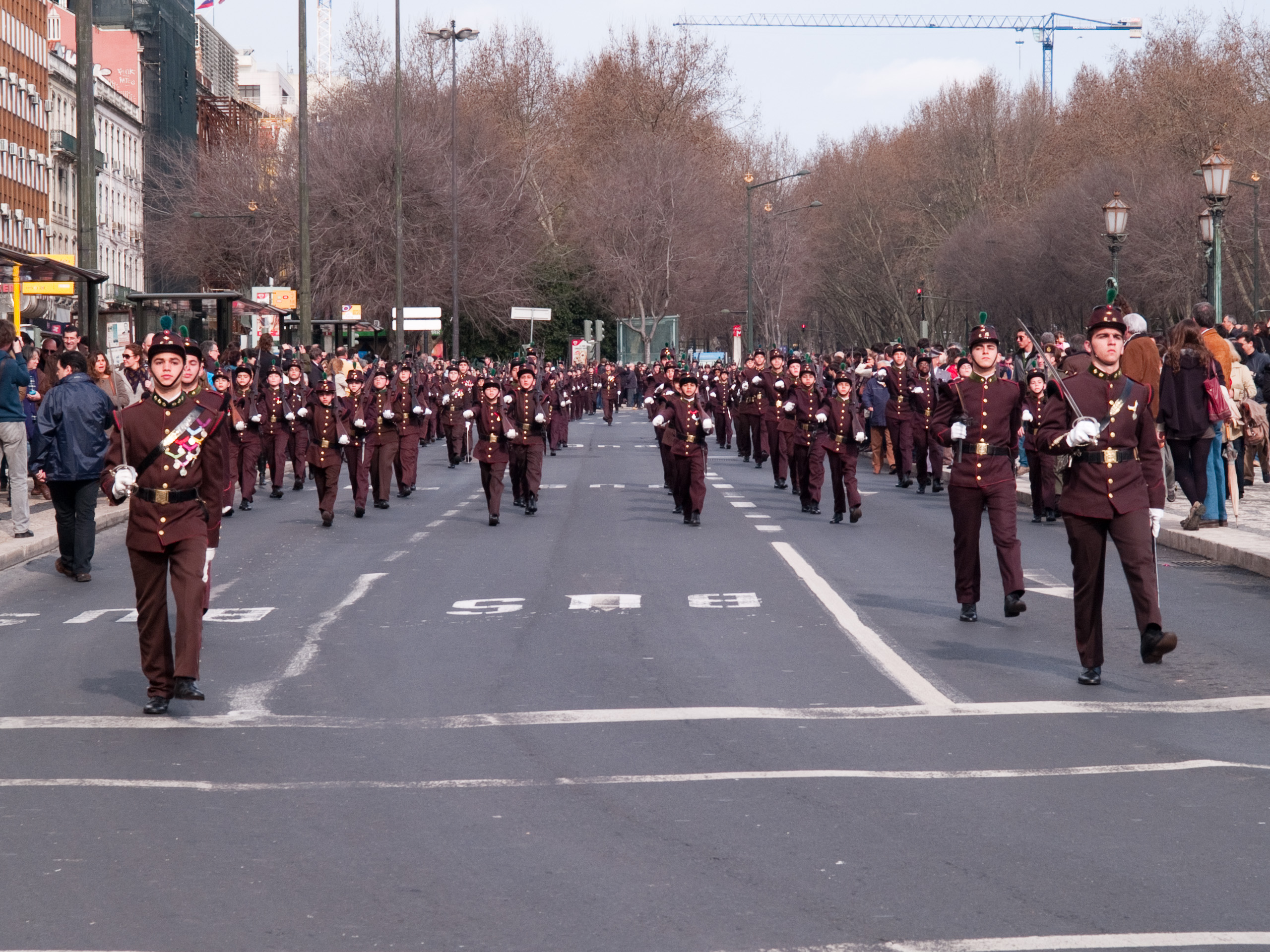
Students' battalion parade

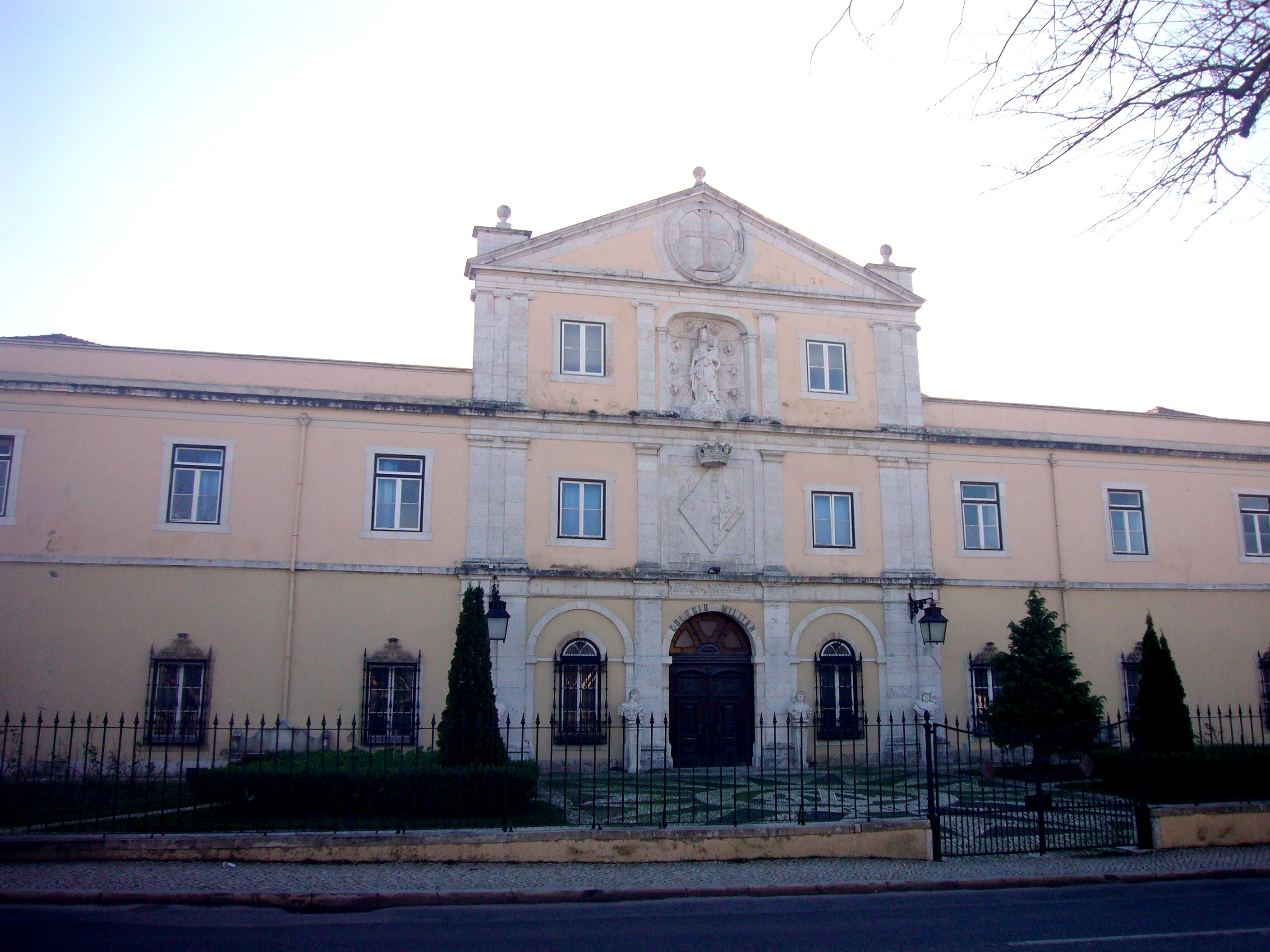
Facade of the main building of the Colégio Militar

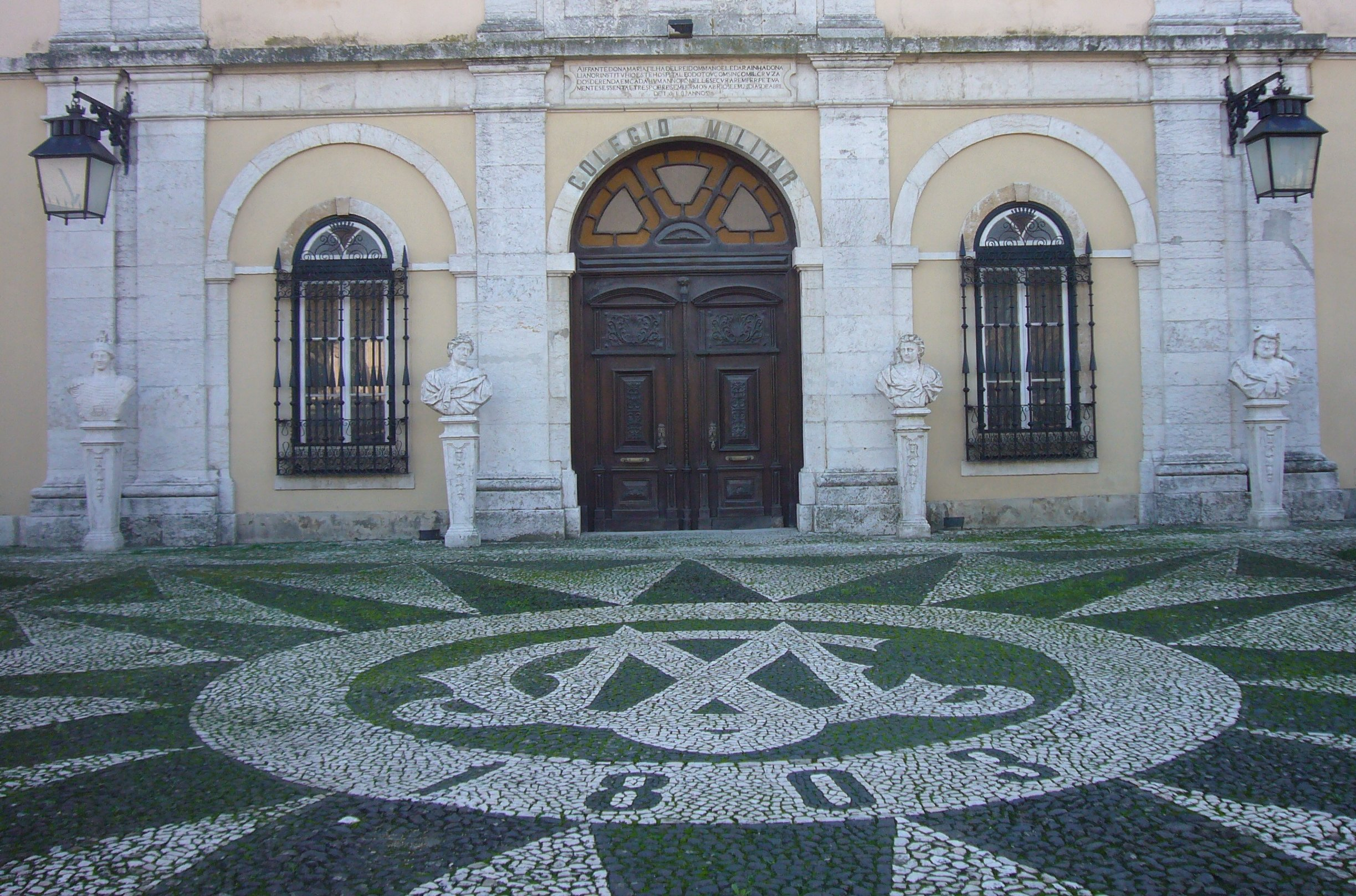
Detail of the entrance of the main building
