= Luz V =

Studio album by Luz Casal
- Released: 1989
- Studio: Madrid, Brussels, Bonn,
- Genre: Rock; hard rock; pop rock; Rock en español
- Length: 60:20
- Label: Hispavox
- Producer: Chucho Merchán; Pancho Varona; Paco Trinidad; Luz Casal; David Summers; Gloria Varona

Luz Casal chronology
Quiéreme aunque te duela (1987)	Luz V (1989)	A contraluz (1991)

Singles from Luz V
- 1. "Te dejé marchar" Released: 1989; 2. "Loca" Released: 1989; 3. "No me importa nada" Released: 1989; 4. "El tren" Released: 1989; 5. "He visto un ángel" Released: 1990

"Luz V", also known as "V", is the fifth studio album by the Spanish rock singer-songwriter Luz Casal. It was her very first album released in 1989 under Hispavox her new label after departing from Zafiro, her former record company.

On this album, she started collaborating with other artists and the executive production of the Colombian musician Chucho Merchán, who participated on Casal's previous album as a musician in 1987. She also met other composers such as Paco Trinidad and Pancho Varona (one of the regular producers of Joaquín Sabina).

This album is her longest studio release with 14 tracks, much longer than her four first albums which only had nine songs.

== Style ==
Five maxi singles were extracted from this release. With this album, unlike the previous one, Luz returned to the rock or hard rock sound of her first three releases but improved with a more modern and more sophisticated production. It is considered that this album is the most "Rock''n Roll" one of the career of this singer with only three ballads. One of those ballads, that was released as the first Maxi single, was "Te dejé marchar" (I let you go), which was composed by David Summers, the lead member of the band Hombres G. This song is considered by many as a hymn dedicated to those ones who have lost their lovers. The second and very popular single was "Loca" (Crazy woman) a song with very sensual and provocating lyrics that had a much more powerful sound and stronger arrangements.

The third single and arguably the most popular one of this album was "No me importa nada" (I don't care at all), a song arranged with caribbean rhythms whose lyrics, written by Gloria Varona and based on a personal story of the lyricist, showed feelings of distrust and lack of confidence to a possible lover. So high was the popularity of this song that it even reached the first place in Los 40 principales top 40 chart and was translated into French. The remaining two maxi singles "El tren" (The train) and "He visto un angel" (I've seen an angel) were powerful rock tracks as the most songs in this album.

== Track listing ==
No.	Title	Length
1.	"Loca (Crazy woman)"	03:55
2.	"Te dejé marchar (I let you go)"	05:30
3.	"No es normal (It's not normal)"	03:57
4.	"Amigo mío (My friend)"	04:20
5.	"He visto un ángel (I've seen an angel)"	04:23
6.	"El tren (The train)"	04:01
7.	"Es como es (It's the way it is)"	04:20
8.	"No me importa nada (I don't care about anything)"	04:16
9.	"Una señal (One signal)"	04:11
10.	"¿Dónde está el cielo? (Where is heaven?)"	05:20
11.	"Miedo a mi propia sombra (Afraid of my own shadow)"	03:46
12.	"Un recuerdo (A memory)"	03:55
13.	"No más infierno (No more hell)"	03:54
14.	"Dame más (Give me more)"	04:35

== Reception ==
Luz Casal sold with this album in Spain over 400.000 copies. Due to these high selling figures it is considered that the performer entered in her golden era due to the everytime bigger exposure both inside and outside Spain. Some year later in 1998, a compilation album which featured the French version of "No me importa nada" was released in France receiving also a successful welcome.
