= A Contraluz (Luz Casal album) =

A contraluz (Backlight)

Studio album by Luz Casal
- Released: 1991
- Studio: Madrid, London, Bonn,
- Genre: Rock; Hard rock; Pop rock; Rock en español; Ballad; Bolero
- Length: 60:20
- Label: Hispavox
- Producer: Chucho Merchán; Pancho Varona; Paco Trinidad; Luz Casal; David Summers; Gloria Varona

Luz Casal chronology
Luz V (1989)	A contraluz (Backlight) (1991)	Como la flor prometida (1995)

Singles from A contraluz (Backlight)
- 1. "Un pedazo de cielo" Released: 1991; 2. "Es por ti" Released: 1991; 3. "Tal para cual" Released: 1991; 4. "Piensa en mi" Released: 1991; 5. "Un año de amor" Released: 1991

"A contraluz" (Backlight) is the sixth studio album by the Spanish female rock singer-songwriter Luz Casal, released in 1991, two years after her previous release. It is also her second album for Hispavox, her music label since 1989. This album, also produced by the Colombian Chucho Merchán, by Paco Trinidad and by herself, confirms Casal's reputation as one of the best voices in the Spanish music scene. The commercial success of this album is highly related to the film High Heels, directed by Pedro Almodovar, for which two songs from this album were included in its soundtrack.

== Style ==
In this album, Casal maintains the rock side of her previous releases with strong guitars and powerful drums. In some songs, such as "Tu orgullo", she even combines those with country music sounds but, in general, the ballads gain more and more space in this album. As in the previous record, five songs were released as Maxi singles. The first was "Un pedazo de cielo" (A piece of heaven), which follows the usual style of the singer. The next single was "Es por ti" (It's for you) which is a cover version of "Boig per Tu", originally sung in Catalan by the band Sau. The following singles from the album were all ballads, "Tal para cual" (Made for each other), and most notably, "Piensa en mi" (Think of me), and "Un año de amor" (A year of love).

"Piensa en mi" (Think of me) was originally composed by the Mexican bolero singer Agustín Lara in 1935 and has been covered and performed by various Latin American artists during the 20th century. Casal's version was used in the Almodovar's High Heels in a performance that was portrayed in the image of a suffering Becky del Páramo, played by Marisa Paredes. The version that Casal sung for the film was a surprise, both for many of her followers and for many musical critics, because it was the first time that a rock singer haddared to perform a bolero. Casal's performance received a very positive response, praising the heartbreaking sensitivity she shows. The last single from the album, "Un año de amor" (A year of love), an adaptation of Nino Ferrer's 1963 song C'est irréparable was used in the film, this time sensually with the image of a transvestite Miguel Bosé. These songs heavily influenced Casal's repertoire in her following albums.

== Track list ==
1. "Un Pedazo de Cielo"/A Piece of Heaven (Luz Casal, Pablo Sycet, Tony Carmona) 4:58
2. "Se Verá"/It Remains to be Seen (Casal, Javier Monforte, Paco Trinidad) 4:45
3. "Todo Va Bien"/All is Well (John Parsons, Serge Mailliard, Casal, Sycet) 4:12
4. "A Mil Kilometros"/A Thousand Kilometers (Casal, Sycet, Monforte, Trinidad) 4:28
5. "Es Por Ti"/It's For You (Pep Sala, Carles Sabater, Joan Capdevilla) 4:43
6. "Tal Para Cual"/Made for Each Other (Carmen Santonja, Alvaro De Cardenas) 4:04
7. "¿Que Día Es Hoy?"/What's Today? (Casal, Santoja, Cardenas) 5:00
8. "Es Mejor Que Te Vayas"/It's Better That You Go" (Summers) 3:51
9. "Tu Orgullo"/Your Pride (Casal, Sycet, Carmona) 4:57
10. "Piensa en mí"/Think of Me (Agustin Lara) 4:29
11. "Un Año De Amor" (C'est irréparable/Un anno d'amore)/A Year of Love (Nino Ferrer/G. Verlor, spanish text : Pedro Almódovar) 3:21

== Reception ==
The LP sold over 600,000 copies, receiving a six-times platinum certification. This was due largely to the success of the singles "Piensa En Mi" and "Un Año de Amor"
