= La Luz (disambiguation) =

La Luz is a census-designated place in Otero County, New Mexico, United States.

La Luz may also refer to:

- La Luz, Cuba, a small town in Cuba
- La Luz F.C., a football team in Uruguay
- La Luz–La Paz, a Málaga Metro station

== Music ==
- La Luz (band), a Los Angeles-based surf rock band
- "La Luz" (Juanes song), 2013
- "La Luz (Fin)", a song by Kali Uchis and Jhay Cortez from Sin Miedo (del Amor y Otros Demonios)
- "La Luz" (Thalía and Myke Towers song), 2020
- La Luz, EP by Christina Aguilera, from her Spanish-language ninth studio album, Aguilera (2022)

== See also ==
- Luz (disambiguation)
