= Un mar de confianza =

Un mar de confianza (A sea of confidence)

Studio album by Luz Casal
- Released: 1999
- Studio: Madrid, London, Buenos Aires, Mexico City
- Genre: Rock; hard rock; pop rock; Rock en español; Ballad; Bolero; Celtic music
- Length: 60:20
- Label: Hispavox
- Producer: Nick Patrick; Paco Trinidad; Luz Casal; Rui Veloso; Pedro Ayres Magalhaes; Manu Katche

Luz Casal chronology
Como la flor prometida (1995)	Un mar de confianza (A sea of confidence) (1999)	Con otra mirada (2002)

Singles from Un mar de confianza (A sea of confidence)
- 1. "Mi confianza" Released: 1999; 2. "Sentir" Released: 2000; 3. "Sumisa" Released: 2000; 4. "Quisiera ser y no puedo" Released: 2000; 5. "Inesperadamente" Released: 2001

"Un mar de confianza" (A sea of confidence) is the eighth studio album of the Spanish singer-songwriter Luz Casal, released in the last quarter of 1999, after a four years long hiatus due to the death of her father. This is also her fourth and last album with Hispavox before departing from that label two years later. In this album, Casal turned into a melodic singer. She recorded this album in eight different studios in Madrid, London, Mexico City and Buenos Aires. The performer's executive production team included Nick Patrick, along with the collaboration of other musicians such as the French drummer Manu Katché and the British Nick Ingman.

== Style ==
After suffering from personal problems due to the death of her father, "Un mar de confianza" shows feelings of loneliness, self compassion and sadness. The album reflects, both in the cover, the black and white promotional photos and in the songs, a general atmosphere of desolation and coldness. It has been reported that she recorded a more mature album with a more elaborated production and arrangements and a wider range of musical influences. Those feelings of loneliness and need for support are clearly shown in the first maxi single of this album entitled "Mi confianza" (My confidence), a song that was arranged with acoustic guitars and soft drums. This song aired on Spanish radio stations one month before the release of the album. It aroused great interest in the media thanks to its moving lyrics. The interest was so great that the album won an Ondas Award for the best song in October 1999, an event in which the singer presented the song.

In the first months of 2000, Luz Casal released the following single from this album entitled "Sentir" (To feel), a track written and composed by Torres Muniz and Pedro Ayres Magalhaes, members of the Portuguese band Madredeus, in which the performer talks about the need of having the company of the most loved ones while there's still time left. This song received an even better response by the audience and in fact, reached the first place in the Los 40 Principales top 40 chart.

The third single of this album was "Sumisa" (Submissive), a song with feminist lyrics which talk about the discrimination, violence and various humiliations that women still suffer in many aspects of life. One fragment of the lyrics says "In the name of whom have you lost your voice, turned into a hostage of your owner and lord?" This single was performed for first time in the RTVE music show "El séptimo de caballería", presented by Miguel Bosé.

The last maxi single from this album was "Inesperadamente" (Unexpectedly). This song, composed by the Portuguese singer Rui Veloso, talks about the need to start again after suffering a sentimental loss and finally, the fifth and last single was "Quisiera ser y no puedo" (I would like to be but I just can't), a rock song similar to the ones of Casal's previous releases.

== Track listing ==
No.	Title	Length
1.	"Sumisa (Submissive)"	04:59
2.	"Mi confianza (My confidence)"	03:38
3.	"Despierta mi vida (Wake up baby)"	04:32
4.	"Quisiera ser y no pued (I would like to be but I just can't)"	03:39
5.	"Inesperadamente (Unexpectedly)"	03:18
6.	"Aparta de mi (Go far away from me)"	04:44
7.	"Sentir (To feel)"	04:11
8.	"Los dos (Both of us)"	03:29
9.	"Prefiero morirme (I prefer to die)"	03:59
10.	"Muro invisible (Invisible wall)"	03:28
11.	"Momentos de ternura (Moments of tenderness)"	04:00
12.	"Tu silencio (Your silence)"	04:17
13.	"Aquí estoy bien (Here I'm ok)"	05:27

== Certifications ==
Region	Certification	Certified units/sales
Spain (Promusicae)	3× Platinum	300,000^{^}
^{^} Shipments figures based on certification alone.
