= Luz III =

Studio album by Luz Casal
- Released: 1985
- Studio: Madrid, Brussels, Bonn, Prague
- Genre: Rock Music; Hard rock; Pop rock; Rock en español
- Length: 50:20
- Label: Zafiro
- Producer: Carlos Narea, Roque Narvaja, Luz Casal, Ramoncín, Hilario Camacho, Carmen Santonja

Luz Casal chronology
Los ojos del gato (1984)	Luz III (1985)	Quiéreme aunque te duela (1987)

Singles from Luz III
- 1. "Rufino" Released: 1985; 2. "Voy a por ti" Released: 1985; 3. "Hechizado" Released: 1985

Luz III is the third studio album of the Spanish female Rock singer-songwriter Luz Casal released in 1985, only one year after "Los ojos del gato" (her previous work). The singer started working in this third album short after finishing the recording of her preceding album and after its subsequent tours and TV appearances. As usual, Casal wrote most of the nine songs except from one cover and some other collaborations. Carlos Narea, and Roque Narvaja, were, as usual, the executive producers of this album amongst others.

== Style ==
Luz Casal started evolving from her initial, but still remaining Rock'n Roll and Hard rock style to a more adult focus. The first three tracks that open the album, which were the ones that were released as Maxi singles, were the typical youthful rock songs that filled the Spanish airplay charts during the 1980s. "Rufino" (Rufus) arguably the most popular single from this release was composed by Carmen Santonja, one of the two members of the popular band Vainica Doble. This song tells the story of an old, but at the same time cheerful and kind businessman who tries to seduce a young girl. "Voy a por ti" (I'm heading towards you), the next single, for which was recorded a promotional video, and "Hechizado" (Charmed), the following one, also share the same rock essence.

The following tracks, which are more calmed, are this time the most worth of note songs. Among those it must be taken into account "Una décima de segundo" (One tenth of a second) a cover of the mythical band Nacha Pop. The more relaxed rhythm of the songs goes on till "Deseo en silencio" (I wish in silence) the ending track of the record. From then on, Casal went on developing this more mature creative approach started by this album.

== Track listing ==
No.	Title	Length
1.	"Voy a por ti (I'm heading towards you)"	04:42
2.	"Hehcizado (Charmed)"	04:04
3.	"Rufino (Little Rufus)"	04:26
4.	"Una décima de segundo (One tenth of a second)"	03:29
5.	"Entre la espada y la pared (Between the sword and the wall)"	03:27
6.	"Vives del cuento (You are a lazy)"	04:01
7.	"Nunca más (Never again)"	04:01
8.	"Jazmin (Jasmine)"	03:42
9.	"Deseo en silencio (I wish in silence)"	04:28

== Reception ==
The sales of this third album were higher than the previous two ones. Luz III sold over 200.000 copies in Spain partially because of "Rufino", the most popular song of this record, and also because of the increasing media exposure thanks to her usual performances in RTVE shows and her presence in international events such as a festival in Czechoslovakia and some concerts in Germany.
