= Los ojos del gato =

Los ojos del gato (Cat's eyes)

Studio album by Luz Casal
- Released: 1984
- Studio: Madrid, Brussels, Bonn
- Genre: Rock music; Hard rock; Pop rock
- Length: 50:20
- Label: Zafiro
- Producer: Carlos Narea, Roque Narvaja, Luz Casal, Ramoncín, Hilario Camacho

Luz Casal chronology
Luz (1982)	Los ojos del gato (Cat's eyes) (1984)	Luz III (1985)

Singles from Luz
- 1. "Los ojos del gato" Released: 1983; 2. "Detrás de tu mirada / Te espero" Released: 1984; 3. "Secreto" Released: 1984

Los ojos del gato (Cat's eyes) is the second studio album of the Spanish female singer-songwriter Luz Casal, released in 1984 under the record label Zafiro. It was recorded in Madrid, Brussels and Bonn and consists of nine tracks, the most of them written by Casal herself and by other collaborators such as Ramoncín and other performers such as Hilario Camacho. As with her previous album, Carlos Narea served as executive producer.

== Style ==
In regards to the musical style of this release, this album follows the same line of her previous one with rock and hard rock tracks. Anyway, many critics say that this album has a more mature and darker sound compared to her previous record, a more innovative and sober production and deeper lyrics. In an auto-interview for RTVE with herself and her producers, the singer admitted that the tracks in the album had a wider relation between each other. Although rock music clearly dominates in this album, there are some different songs such as the ballad "Te espero" (I wait for you), which combines electronic elements with guitars and a softer instrumentation.

Four tracks from this album were released as maxi singles: The first one of them was the title track "Los ojos del gato" (Cat's eyes) and the following two singles were "Detrás de tu mirada / Te espero" (Behind your glance / I wait for you) and "Secreto" (Secret). Those singles came out few months before the release of the album and in fact, Luz Casal was invited to perform some of her tracks in some RTVE shows.

== Track listing ==
No.	Title	Length
1.	"Los ojos del gato (Cat's eyes)"	04:52
2.	"Prisionera del sueño (Prissioner of the dream)"	04:22
3.	"Secreto (Secret)"	04:22
4.	"Tengo bastante (I have enough)"	03:07
5.	"Te espero (I wait for you)"	04:49
6.	"Detrás de tu mirada (Behind your glance)"	03:29
7.	"No es así (It's not like that)"	04:52
8.	"No llevo dirección (I haven't got a direction)"	04:15
9.	"Sin ti (Without you)"	07:38
