= Karen Taft =

Danish ballet dancer and choreographer

Karen Taft (born Karen Marie Toft Jensen; 1905–1997) was a Danish ballet dancer, choreographer and classical ballet teacher. From the mid-1940s, she was based in Madrid where from 1949 she ran the country's principal ballet school.

== Biography ==
Born in Copenhagen on 25 April 1905, Karen Toft Jensen was the daughter of the successful hotel director Anders Jensen (1861-1940) and Karen Kjerstine Nørtoft (1874-1933). When she was 16, despite the disapproval of her family, she began seriously to study ballet. Two years later, she met the choreographer Michel Fokine who complimented her on her performance. In order to prevent further problems with her family, she moved to New York.

In 1929, she was engaged by the Roxy Theater in the Rockefeller Center where she danced for two years before returning to Europe as a solo dancer. As she toured, she sought out the best teachers, including Lyubov Yegorova and Olga Preobrajenska in Paris and Tamara Karsavina and Anton Dolin in London.

Taft returned to Denmark in 1939 where she established a ballet company. Faced with the threat of war, she soon dissolved it and moved to Madrid in 1940. Despite the results of the civil war, she fell in love with the country and decided to stay there. In 1949, she founded her ballet school. Over the years, it became an integral part of the city's cultural scene, training many ballet dancers who joined the country's theatres. In the 1950s, she also worked as a choreographer, participating in García Leoz's La duquesa de Candil and assisting with the review Te espero en Eslava.

Karen Taft died in Madrid on 26 July 1997.
