= Luz Casal =

Spanish pop singer

The Most Illustrious Luz Casal Marchioness of Luz y Paz
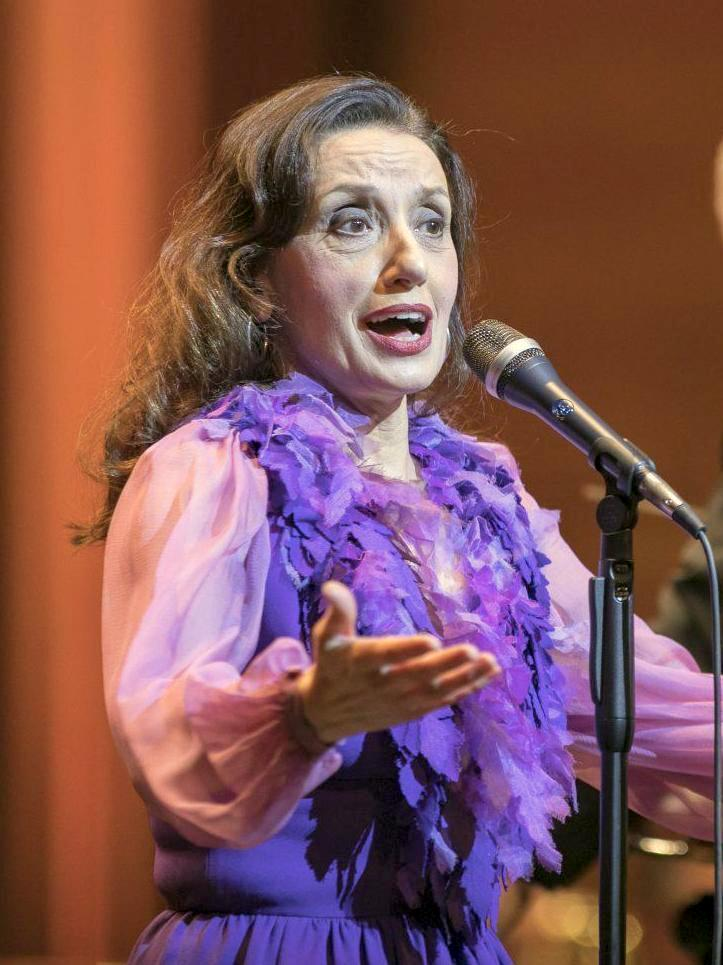
- Casal in 2018.

Background information
- Born: María Luz Casal Paz; 11 November 1958 (age 67); Boimorto, Galicia, Spain
- Genres: Pop; rock
- Occupations: Singer; songwriter
- Years active: 1980–present
- Labels: Hispavox; Zafiro
- Website: Luz Casal

María Luz Casal Paz, 1st Marchioness of Luz y Paz (Spanish pronunciation: [luθ kaˈsal]; born 11 November 1958), is a Spanish pop and rock singer. Born in Boimorto, Galicia, she grew up in the Asturian city of Avilés where she first took singing, piano and ballet classes, and moved to Madrid to pursue a career as a musician.

She became famous in the early 1980s, and remained an important figure in Spanish pop music all through said decade and beyond, with her sound gradually maturing towards soft adult pop. She recorded a cover version of Étienne Daho's French language song "Duel au Soleil" in Spanish called "Un nuevo día brillará", which became a hit song. Since the beginning of her career, she has sold over five million albums.

In 1992, she enjoyed great success with her appearance in the soundtrack of Pedro Almodóvar's acclaimed film High Heels singing Agustín Lara's theme "Piensa en mí".

In January 2007, Casal was diagnosed with breast cancer and underwent an operation at the Ruber Clinic in Madrid; seven months later, she revealed to the Spanish media that she had overcome her disease. More recently in May 2010, she announced that she had been diagnosed with cancer in her other breast and had to cancel her current tour to be operated on.

Her middle name, Luz, means "light" in Spanish, her title as marchioness of Luz y Paz means "Light and Peace".

== Biography ==
=== Early years ===
Luz Casal is the daughter of José Casal and Matilde Paz. When she went to live in Avilés she studied at Paula Frassinetti School, founded by the Dorotean Sisters of Charity. Then the family went to live in Gijón where she performed for the first time in front of fifty people. There she studied piano and ballet and formed part of a rock group called Los Fannys that made versions of other artist's songs. Luz also formed part of another band that performed in Asturias, León and Galicia. Nevertheless, she always wanted to be a solo singer.

In 1977, to start her career on the music scene, and after convincing her parents, she went to Madrid, where she made her first recording called "La guapa" ("The Beautiful"), and made contact with a lot of record labels until an independent production company gave her an audition as a backing singer, which is how she entered the world of professional music. She was a backing singer for many artists' recordings and she accompanied Juan Pardo in his live performances. From that moment on, she started composing her first songs, of which she recorded ten, but they were not released. In these years, she made her only appearance in the theatre, taking the role of Raquel Meller in the musical Las Divinas ("The Divines"), performed in the Reina Victoria theatre in Madrid.

In 1980, she released her first single with a multinational company, "El ascensor" ("The Elevator"), a song with a strong reggae flavour as a tribute to Bob Marley. She presented this song in Tocata, a popular music show in RTVE. After that she took part in many festivals held in different countries and took dance classes with Karen Taft, Arnold Taraborelli, Lindsay Kemp, Merche Esmeralda, and Goyo Montero.

=== First recordings ===
In 1981, seeking less control over her private life, Casal joined the company Zafiro and took part in the live album published by the group Leño. The following year she started the recording of her first solo album, in Madrid, Brussels and Amsterdam, which was released in September 1982 and was named "Luz". The album was produced by Carlos Narea, and included songs composed by herself and by Roque Navaja. She appeared for the first time in a TV program, and participated in a book-album of the poet Xaime Noguerol. In 1983, she recorded the video of the maxi-single "No aguanto más" ("I Can't Stand Anymore"), then she started making live performances and took part in the tour El rock de una noche de verano (The Rock of a Summer Night) with Miguel Ríos and Leño, with whom she performed in 35 cities of Spain.

In 1984, she released her second album, Los ojos del gato ("The Eyes of the Cat"), recorded in Spain, Belgium and Germany. Some of the songs, written by Ramoncín and Hilario Camacho, gained listeners throughout Europe. Casal kept on studying: piano, chorus and performance. Luz III, released in 1985, contains a very popular track called "Rufino", by Carmen Santonja (member of the band Vainica Doble). That year, Casal performed in a festival held in Czechoslovakia, with artists from other countries; Casal still remembers the impact of hearing "No aguanto más" and "Ciudad sin ley" ("Lawless City") being played by an orchestra with wind instruments. In 1986, she gave more than 90 concerts and performed again for Czech television. In Germany, she recorded the song "The Water Is Life", for an environmental campaign, with artists such as Mark Knopfler.

In 1987, she recorded an a capella song with the group the Christians for a television program and in May of that year, her next album Quiéreme aunque te duela ("Love Me Even If It Hurts You") was launched, in which she started to be less of a rocker and discovered herself as a performer of ballads, which were the greatest hits of that release. The album included "A Cada Paso", which became her breakout hit in Latin America. It climbed to the number one position in Argentina, Chile, Uruguay and Mexico. The Mexican female pop-band Flans made a cover of the song in 1990, which also became a big hit in that country. She participated in the TV program ¡Qué noche la de aquel año! (How Incredible Was That Year's Night) which was hosted by Miguel Ríos, then she travelled to Mexico, Venezuela and New York City.

In 1988, she appeared in the TV program Viaje con nosotros ("Travel with Us") by Javier Gurruchaga (lead singer of Orquesta Mondragón), and at a benefit gig in Seville, Casal performed a tango version of "Quiereme aunque te duela".

=== Success ===
In 1989, Casal released with her new label Hispavox, the album V produced by Paco Trinidad and Chucho Merchán, a regular collaborator with Eurythmics. The album, which sold over 300,000 copies and was her definitive leap to stardom, includes two of the most important songs of her career: "Te Dejé Marchar" ("I Let You Go") and "No Me Importa Nada" ("Nothing Matters for Me"). That year, she took part in a festival held in Chile in favour of human rights, among artists and groups such as Sting and U2.

In 1991, Casal released A Contraluz ("Backlight"), which sold over 400,000 copies. In this album are the bolero "Piensa en mí" ("Think of Me"), composed by Agustín Lara, and the song "Un año de amor" which were chosen by Pedro Almodóvar for his film Tacones Lejanos ("High Heels"). Almodóvar translated the latter song, originally by the Frenchman Nino Ferrer, from the Italian hit version by Mina. These two hits made her well-known in Europe, especially in France.

Following that, Casal took a four-year break away from recording studies, a time when she started thinking about her career because of her success, but she kept on performing in Spain, Latin America, France and other European countries.

In early 1995, Casal travelled to London with producer Paco Trinidad, to work with Eurythmics engineer Darren Allison and the members of Paul McCartney's band, namely Paul"Wix" Wickens, and Robbie Mackintosh, on tracks for her next album, entitled Como La Flor Prometida ("Like the Promised Flower"). The album was released later in 1995, four years after her previous album. It sold over 800,000 copies, being the most successful album of her career.

In 1996, she released a compilation album, Pequeños Y Grandes Exitos ("Hits, Great and Small"). Two years later, she released another compilation album only in France, Luz Casal, that sold more than 400,000 copies and included two songs in French, "Tu Ne L'Emporteras Pas" and "Entre Mes Souvenirs", versions of "No Me Importa Nada" and "Entre Mis Recuerdos", respectively. She performed those songs in the Olympia Theatre of Paris and became the first Spanish pop singer to perform in La Cigale Theatre.

=== Subsequent albums ===
In 1999, after four years without having released anything following the death of her father, she recorded Un Mar De Confianza ("A Sea of Trust") which sold over 600,000 copies. That year, the song "Mi Confianza" ("My Trust") was awarded the Ondas Award in the category for Best Song. She then started a European tour performing in France, Italy, Switzerland and Belgium. Soon after, she collaborated on an album by Rosendo called Siempre Hay Una Historia ("There's Always a History"), recorded in the Carabanchel Prison. In 2001, she received the Goya Award in the category of Best Original Song from the soundtrack of the animated film El Bosque Animado ("The Living Forest").

In November 2002, Casal released the album Con Otra Mirada ("With Another Look"), with 150,000 copies sold and in October 2004 she released the album Sencilla Alegría ("Single Happiness"), recorded in Du Manoir Studio with production by Javier Limón. The album, which sold over 150,000 copies includes influences from flamenco to jazz and also features Chris Barron (from Spin Doctors), Jerry Gonzalez, Olivier Durán, Pablo Guerrero, Rui Veloso, Niño Josele, Quique González and Pablo Novoa, amongst other collaborators. This album includes "Negra Sombra" ("Black Shadow"), a poem by Rosalía de Castro, set to music by Juan Montes Capón, which was on the soundtrack to Mar Adentro, by Alejandro Amenábar.

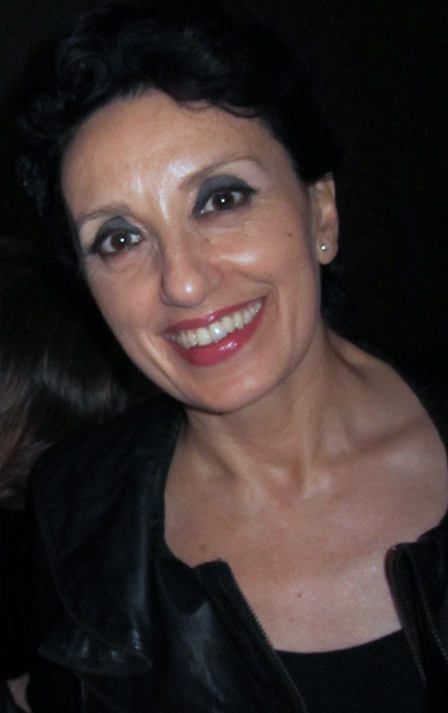
Luz Casal promoting "La pasión" (2009)

Having overcome breast cancer, on 12 October 2007 Casal released the new single "Se Feliz" ("Be Happy") from her new album, Vida Tóxica ("Toxic Life"), inspired by her experience with chemotherapy. The album was recorded and mixed in London once again, with Darren Allison and the same team of musicians who had performed on Como La Flor Prometida, with the addition of bass guitarist Pino Palladino. Vida Tóxica appeared in November 2007.

On 29 September 2009, she released the album La Pasión ("The Passion"), an album in which the singer paid homage to the most important bolero singers from the 1940s to the 1960s. In that album, she made versions of songs such as "Alma Mía" ("My Soul"), "Cenizas" ("Ashes"), and "Historia De Un Amor" ("The History of a Love"). The album went gold in Spain and platinum in France. Apart from the release of the new album, Casal was awarded with the Medal of Arts and Culture of France which coincided with the release of her new album.

In 2011, she released Un ramo de rosas, a compilation album of all the love songs and boleros she recorded during her career. Two years after this release, in 2013 the singer launched the studio album Almas gemelas ("Twin Souls").

After a long hiatus, in 2017 Casal released in France a covers album of songs by Dalida, the French diva who inspired many of Casal's songs. One year later, back in Spain, she launched the album Que corra el aire ("Let the Air Flow"), which was well received critically.

== Discography ==
=== Albums / singles ===
Year	Album title	Peak position SPA	Peak position FRA	Singles from the album
1977				1977: "La guapa"
1980				1980: "El ascensor"
1982	Luz			1982: "No aguanto más" 1982: "Ciudad sin ley" 1982: "Eres tú"
1984	Los ojos del gato			1984: "Los ojos del gato" 1984: "Detrás de tu mirada" 1984: "Secreto"
1985	Luz III			1985: "Voy a por ti" 1985: "Rufino"; 1985: "Hechizado"
1987	Quiéreme aunque te duela			1987: "Quiéreme aunque te duela" 1987: "Un día marrón" 1987: "Qué rabia" 1987: "A cada paso"
1989	Luz V			1988: "Te dejé marchar" 1989: "Loca"; 1989: "No me importa nada" 1990: "El tren" 1990: "He visto a un ángel"
1991	A contraluz			1991: "Piensa en mí" 1991: "Un pedazo de cielo" 1991: "Un año de amor" 1992: "Es por ti" 1992: "Tal para cual"
1995	Como la flor prometida			1995: "Entre mis recuerdos" 1995: "Lo eres todo" 1995: "Besaré el suelo" 1996: "Plantado en mi cabeza" 1996: "Te ofrezco lo que tengo"
2000	Un mar de confianza		52	1999: "Mi confianza" 2000: "Sentir" 2000: "Sumisa"; 2000: "Quisiera ser y no puedo" 2000: "Inesperadamente"; 2001: "Sentir (Alex Gopher Wings Remix)"
2002	Con otra mirada	4	18	2002: "Ni tú ni yo" 2003: "Dame un beso" 2003: "A veces un cielo" 2003: "Pueden ser tantas cosas"
2005	Sencilla alegría	2	36	2004: "Un nuevo día brillará" 2005: "Sencilla alegría" 2005: "Ecos"; 2005: "No te vayas"
2007	Vida tóxica	9	—	2005: "Sé feliz" 2007: "Soy"; 2007: "18 años"
2009	La Pasión	3	11	2009: "Con mil desengaños" 2009: "Historia de un amor" 2009: "No, no y no"
2011	Un ramo de rosas	9	42	2011: "Un ramo de rosas" 2011: "Gracias a la vida"
2013	Almas gemelas	8	61	2013: "¿Por qué no vuelves, amor?"
2017	Luz Casal chante Dalida, A mi manera (France only)		97	2017: "Fini la comédie"
2018	Que corra el aire	2		2018: "Miénteme al oído"

=== Compilation albums ===
- Pequeños y grandes éxitos (1996)
- The Best of Luz Casal (1998)
- Pequeños, medianos y grandes éxitos (2006) (also separate French edition for France)

=== Soundtracks ===
- Tacones lejanos (1991)
- El Bosque animado (2001)
