= Luz (Luz Casal album) =

Studio album by Luz Casal
- Released: 19 September 1982
- Studio: Madrid, Brussels, Amsterdam
- Genre: Rock; hard rock; pop rock
- Length: 50:20
- Label: Zafiro
- Producer: Carlos Narea, Roque Narvaja, Luz Casal

Luz Casal chronology
Luz (1982)	Los ojos del gato (1984)

Singles from Luz
- 1. "Eres tú" Released: 1982; 2. "No aguanto más" Released: 1982; 3. "Ciudad sin ley" Released: 1982

Luz is the debut album by Spanish singer-songwriter Luz Casal, released in September 1982 under the now defunct record label Zafiro. The recording of the album started in 1981, when she left her former record label seeking less control over her personal and creative life. Due to this change, her previous single releases "La guapa" (The beautiful girl), and "El ascensor" (The elevator), released in 1977 and 1980 respectively, were not included in this record.

The album, which was recorded in Madrid, Brussels and Amsterdam, consists of nine tracks, all of them were written by Luz Casal with the executive production or Carlos Narea and with the collaboration of other musicians such as the Argentine singer Roque Narvaja. Most of the songs of this album show a rock to hard-rock sound with a special protagonism of electric and bass guitars and strong drums except from some songs such as the ballad "Eres tú" (You are). In general, Luz, with this album, departed from the reggae flavour of her previous releases to a much harder and aggressive sound.

From this album three songs were released as maxi singles: Ciudad sin ley (Lawless city), Eres tú (You are) and No aguanto más (I Can't stand anymore). Thanks to these songs, the vocalist started gaining some media exposure, and in fact, some of her songs were performed live in some RTVE shows.

This album was released initially in Spain and Argentina but it was re-released ten years later, when the popularity of the performer started rising significantly.

== Track listing ==
No.	Title	Length
1.	"No aguanto más (I can't stand anymore)"
2.	"Ciudad sin ley (Lawless city)"
3.	"Eres tú (You are)"
4.	"Debajo de ti (Under you)"
5.	"Cleptómana (Kleptomaniac)"
6.	"Voy (I'm going)"
7.	"Tú y no yo (You and not me)"
8.	"Hay que tener como sea lo que hay que tener (One must have anyhow what needs to have)"
9.	"Mujeres (Women)"
