= De Luz =

De Luz, DeLuz or Deluz may refer to:

== Places ==
- De Luz, California
- Deluz, France

== People ==
- Joaquín De Luz
