= High Heels (1991 film) =

1991 film by Pedro Almodóvar

- Theatrical release poster
- Spanish: Tacones lejanos
- Directed by: Pedro Almodóvar
- Written by: Pedro Almodóvar
- Produced by: Agustín Almodóvar
- Starring: Victoria Abril; Marisa Paredes; Miguel Bosé
- Cinematography: Alfredo Mayo
- Edited by: José Salcedo
- Music by: Ryuichi Sakamoto
- Production companies: El Deseo; Ciby 2000; TF1 Films Production
- Distributed by: Warner Española S.A. (Spain); UGC PH (France)
- Release dates: 19 October 1991 (Spain); 15 January 1992 (France)
- Running time: 112 minutes
- Countries: Spain; France
- Language: Spanish
- Box office: $16 million (Spain/France/US)

High Heels (Spanish: Tacones lejanos) is a 1991 melodrama film written and directed by Pedro Almodóvar and starring Victoria Abril, Marisa Paredes and Miguel Bosé. The plot follows the fractured relationship between a self-involved mother, a famous torch singer, and her grown daughter she had abandoned as a child. The daughter, who works as a television newscaster, has married her mother's ex-lover and has befriended a female impersonator. A murder further complicates this web of relationships.

The film has the feel of other mother–daughter melodramas like Stella Dallas (1937), Mildred Pierce (1945), Imitation of Life (1959) and particularly Autumn Sonata (1978), which is quoted directly in the film.

Despite mixed reviews, the film was a commercial success. It was selected as the Spanish entry for the Best Foreign Language Film at the 64th Academy Awards, but was not accepted as a nominee.

== Plot ==
Rebeca waits anxiously at a Madrid airport for the return of her mother, Becky del Páramo, a famous torch singer, who is returning to Spain after a fifteen-year stay in Mexico. While waiting, Rebeca recalls incidents from her early life when her mother, preoccupied with her career and romantic life, neglected and rejected her.

Rebeca is now a news broadcaster for a television station owned by her husband, Manuel. The drama of the reunion is intensified because years ago Manuel was one of Becky's lovers. On the night of Becky’s return, Rebeca takes Becky and Manuel to see “Femme Letal” (Lethal Woman), a female impersonator who portrays Becky in his drag act. For some time, Rebeca has been coming to see Letal’s impersonation. That night, while Manuel and Becky remain in the audience, at Letal’s urging, Rebeca goes backstage to help Letal remove his costume. Seeing him naked, Rebeca is impressed by his manhood. When Rebeca admits that she and Manuel have not had sex in 5 months, Letal takes advantage by seducing her. Meanwhile, Manuel tells Becky that he wants to divorce the "difficult" Rebeca, and he and Becky subsequently become lovers again.

A month later, Manuel is murdered in his getaway villa. He had spent the evening first with his mistress, Isabel (Rebeca's sign language interpreter on the news), and then with Becky, who came to break up on discovering his infidelity to her. Arriving to confront Manuel about his infidelities, Rebeca reports discovering the body. The investigating magistrate, Judge Domínguez, aware of the tangled infidelities, suspects both mother and daughter.

During the news broadcast on the day of Manuel's funeral, Rebeca confesses to his murder live on television. She is arrested on camera. The investigating judge seems eager to prove her innocence despite the evidence. While Rebeca spends her first night in prison, Becky makes her return to the Madrid stage. In prison, Rebeca listens to the radio as her mother dedicates to Rebeca her triumphant return performance. A social worker, Paula, takes a special interest in Rebeca; like her, she is heartbroken, grieving the loss of her boyfriend, Hugo. Seeing a picture of Hugo that Paula carries with her, Rebeca thinks that Letal and Hugo are the same person.

Judge Dominguez arranges for Becky privately to see Rebeca, who now denies killing Manuel. Rebeca draws a comparison between herself and the daughter in the film Autumn Sonata, in which the mother, an outstanding pianist, asks her daughter to play the piano then humiliates her by instructing her on how to improve her performance. Rebeca, too, has always felt inferior to Becky, competing with her and "winning" only once by marrying Manuel. Even this “victory” ultimately was denied her when Becky took away Manuel. Rebeca confesses that fifteen years ago, as a child, to be closer to Becky, she murdered her stepfather by switching his medications. She murdered Manuel because he was usurping her mother's affection. Becky tells Rebeca that she needs to find a more constructive way to deal with her issues with men. Rebeca's fixation and her obsessive adoration are too much for Becky's frail heart, whose condition worsens.

When the prison doctor informs Rebeca that she is pregnant—which can only be with Letal's child—the judge releases her from prison despite a lack of fresh evidence. Rebeca goes to see Letal's advertised final drag performance. She discovers that Letal is Judge Dominguez, who posed as Letal and Hugo on different cases, adopting disguises as an investigative strategy. Knowing about her pregnancy, the judge asks Rebeca to marry him. As Rebeca struggles to take this in, they see a television broadcast reporting Becky's sudden heart attack.

They rush to the hospital, where Becky asks for Rebeca’s forgiveness for her selfishness and determines to take the blame for Manuel’s murder as redemption. When Becky is taken home to die, Rebeca gives her the gun, and Becky leaves her fingerprints on it, incriminating herself. Hearing the high heels of women passing in the street, Rebeca tells her mother the sound reminds her of her mother coming home when she was little. She turns around and realizes her mother has died while she was talking.

== Cast ==
- Victoria Abril as Rebeca
  - Rocío Muñoz as young Rebeca
- Marisa Paredes as Becky del Páramo
  - Luz Casal as Becky's singing voice
- Miguel Bosé as Judge Eduardo Dominguez/Letal/Hugo
- Féodor Atkine as Manuel, Rebeca's husband
- Miriam Díaz Aroca as Isabel
- Anna Lizaran as Margarita
- Bibiana Fernández as Chon
- Cristina Marcos as Paula
- Pedro Diez del Corral as Alberto, Rebeca's stepfather
- Mayrata O'Wisiedo as judge's mother
- Nacho Martínez as Juan, Rebeca's father
- Javier Bardem as floor manager at the TV station

== Production ==
High Heels was a tour de force for two essential actresses of the "Almodovarian universe": Marisa Paredes and Victoria Abril. The male lead was difficult to cast. The actor had to be believable in drag and as a judge. The role eventually went to Miguel Bosé, a famous singer in Spain and Latin America. His casting was a cause célèbre of the film publicity.

=== Music ===
The combined effects of voice, music and lyrics is one of the most prominent features of Almodóvar as a filmmaker. He finds his most significant musical economy in the highly expressive boleros, which are at the forefront in this film. Almodóvar explained that he listened to an enormous number of songs to find those he used in the film. He finally chose "Piensa en Mí" and "Un Año De Amor". His idea was to find songs that would correspond to a singer such as Becky del Páramo, both at the start and at the end of her career. "Piensa en Mí" is a very famous song in Mexico, composed by Agustín Lara and sung by Lola Beltrán. Almodóvar eventually chose a version by Chavela Vargas, sung as a lament. "Un año de amor", which Letal sings in playback during his performance, is a French song by Nino Ferrer. There is a famous Italian version sung by Mina, for which Almodóvar rewrote the lyrics in Spanish.

Once the two songs were chosen, Almodóvar had to find a voice that suited Becky del Páramo. After trying several voices, he found that of Luz Casal fitted the appearance of Marisa Paredes. Casal, famous in Spain as a rock singer, accepted Almodóvar's offer and the two songs became her most successful. "Piensa en mí" and "Un año de amor", the songs that Casal performed for the film, were both included on her album A contraluz, released in 1991.

The film also contains an unexpected prison yard dance sequence in reference to famous musicals shot in fake prisons, such as Jailhouse Rock (1957) with Elvis Presley and John Waters' Cry-Baby (1990). The song used in High Heels is a merengue: "Pecadora" by Los Hermanos Rosario.

The score, which Almodóvar did not like, was composed by Ryuichi Sakamoto. For the title sequence and Rebeca's second confession, Almodóvar used pieces composed by Miles Davis in the 1960s, which were inspired by flamenco. The first piece, heard while Rebeca is alone waiting for her mother, is called "Solea", meaning 'solitude' in Andalusian. After her second confession to Judge Dominguez, when Rebeca goes to the cemetery to throw a handful of earth on her husband's coffin, we hear the second piece, "Saeta", by Gil Evans, from his Sketches of Spain album.

Almodóvar also used two themes composed by George Fenton for Dangerous Liaisons (1988). They are heard when Rebeca leaves prison and goes home, and when she returns to prison in the van.

=== Title ===
The original title is Tacones lejanos, which can be translated as Distant Heels and refers to Rebeca's childhood, when she was unable to sleep until her mother entered her bedroom and Rebeca managed to hear the sound of her mother's heels as she left, walking down the hallway. The inaccuracy of the English translation of the title affected the reception of the film, as the English High Heels suggests stylish comedy, whereas the Spanish Distant Heels conveys a feeling of family melodrama. The Spanish title Distant Heels is a reference to Raoul Walsh's film Distant Drums (1951).

== Release ==
=== Box-office ===
High Heels, Almodóvar's ninth film, was co-produced by El Deseo and Ciby 2000 and released in Spain on 19 October 1991. It was enormously successful in Spain. By the end of 1991, it had attracted an audience of more than 1.5 million and was the highest-grossing Spanish film of the year. It eventually came second, in terms of box-office takings, to Women on the Verge of a Nervous Breakdown (1988) among Almodóvar's films released up to that point, with a gross of €5.2 million. In France, it was one of the top ten highest-grossing films of the year with a gross of $8.7 million. In the United States and Canada it grossed $1.7 million.

=== Critical response ===
Spanish critics' reaction was hostile, on the whole. Writing in Dirigido Por, Antonio Castro felt that Almodóvar's desire to create a more straightforward narrative had merely led to a greater loss of vigor. Angel Fernandez Santos, in El País, concluded that, in comparison with Douglas Sirk's Imitation of Life (1959), which he regarded as an Everest, High Heels was a mere hill. In Expansión, Eduardo Torres-Dulce was firmly of the opinion that Almodóvar had had his day. David Thomson of Sight & Sound concluded that in general, High Heels did not measure up to much of Almodóvar's earlier work. For him, the homage to the other films – including Autumn Sonata – "is counter productive, for it merely suggests the inferiority of High Heels".

The film was very successful in Italy, and reviews were both heartfelt and moving. In France, the film was a huge success. It did not fare as well in other countries, such as Germany, where Almodóvar's films have not been well understood. He commented, "My films move very freely and to understand them one must simply allow one's intuition and sensibility free rein... I've never been asked so many irrational questions as in Germany".

It was less successful in the United States than many others of Almodóvar's films. As with Tie Me Up! Tie Me Down! (1989), High Heels was especially attacked on moral grounds, notably by certain women's groups. Almodóvar also complained that Miramax, the film's distributor in the United States, did not understand the film and had no idea what to do with it.

On the review aggregator website Rotten Tomatoes, the film holds an approval rating of 59% based on 17 reviews, with an average rating of 6/10. Metacritic, which uses a weighted average, assigned the film a score of 51 out of 100, based on 12 critics, indicating "mixed or average reviews".

The New York Times' critic Janet Maslin wrote that "High Heels has no real mirth and not even enough energy to keep it lively." Critic Roger Ebert gave the film three stars out of four, commenting that "Pedro Almodóvar's films are an acquired taste, and with High Heels I am at last beginning to acquire it".

=== Accolades ===
High Heels received a Golden Globe nomination for Best Foreign Language Film and Goya Award nominations for Costume Design, Editing, Make-Up and Hairstyles, Sound and Supporting Actress (Cristina Marcos). The film won:

- 1991 César Awards as Best Foreign Film
- 1992 Sant Jordi Awards for Best Spanish Actress

== Home media ==
High Heels has been released on DVD in Region 2, but never issued in Region 1 (US). It received a multi-region DVD release in Mexico in November 2012.

== Analysis ==
The film, which Almodóvar eventually made, was not that which he had intended after completing Law of Desire in 1986. The intended film would have been a variation on the classic play The House of Bernarda Alba by García Lorca, and would have been set in rural Spain, not in Madrid. The story would have involved a domineering mother and her two daughters, both of whom leave home in order to escape her tyranny; the mother is subsequently thought to have perished in a fire, but continues to pursue one of the girls for fifteen years. The proposed film did not come to fruition, for a variety of reasons. Almodóvar turned instead to Women on the Verge of a Nervous Breakdown which could be conveniently shot in Madrid. When he eventually made High Heels, it was fundamentally different from his original idea. Only the title remained. The plot was developed around the idea of someone confessing a crime on a live television news bulletin.

High Heels relates to the American tradition of melodrama and the so-called 'woman's picture'. Imitation of Life (1959), directed by Douglas Sirk, was a major influence and there are some striking parallels between High Heels and Sirk's film. In both, the mother is a performer – Becky is a singer, while the Lana Turner character in Sirk's film is an actress – whose career takes precedence over a young daughter; mother and daughter are rivals over a man; both films begin with the child separated from her mother at a holiday resort; and at one point, Rebeca tells her mother to stop acting, a phrase borrowed from Sirk's film. Imitation of Life was both a remake and a reinterpretation of an earlier film – the 1934 version by John M. Stahl – and so High Heels is very much Almodóvar's own film, distinguished throughout by his particular style and concerns.

With its tense mother–daughter dynamic, it also pointedly nods to Michael Curtiz's Mildred Pierce (1945), though in that film it is the mother, a businesswoman, who obsessively loves her daughter. In Stella Dallas (1937), directed by King Vidor, the same kind of relationship is also prominent, though here, the mother Stella is neither an artist nor a businesswoman but a lower-class woman who has social aspirations for her daughter. It alludes both to the films made by Turner and Joan Crawford and to their lives, to the relationship between Turner, whose lover was killed by her daughter, and to the tumultuous relationship between Crawford and her daughter Christina.

=== Genre ===
High Heels is a melodrama, though its composite narrative (the poster image of a high-heeled shoe, which is also a gun) testifies to the combination of two genres, melodrama and crime thriller. The themes are typical of melodrama: family relations dominate the story-line, as do relationships between men and women. The narrative charts the reuniting of a long-absent mother with her daughter, and their competition over men (one man in particular) and professional success. All the characters have secrets that the viewer knows. The omniscient narration, typical of melodrama, allows suspense only in terms of how other characters react to revelations the viewer anticipates. For example, Becky conceals her heart condition from her daughter, Rebeca conceals the truth about murdering her husband, and the judge conceals his triple identity as Letal, Hugo and Judge Dominguez.

Thirty-five minutes in, a murder occurs, but the plot does not turn the picture into an investigative narrative. The story follows the conflict between mother and daughter, not the crime investigator. It is clear that Letal is the judge and that Rebeca probably killed her husband. The investigative role of Judge Dominguez is further undermined by the fact that his motivation is love for the murderess Rebeca, rather than solving the crime.

== See also ==
- List of submissions to the 64th Academy Awards for Best Foreign Language Film
- List of Spanish submissions for the Academy Award for Best Foreign Language Film
