= Chucho Merchán =

Colombian bassist and guitarist

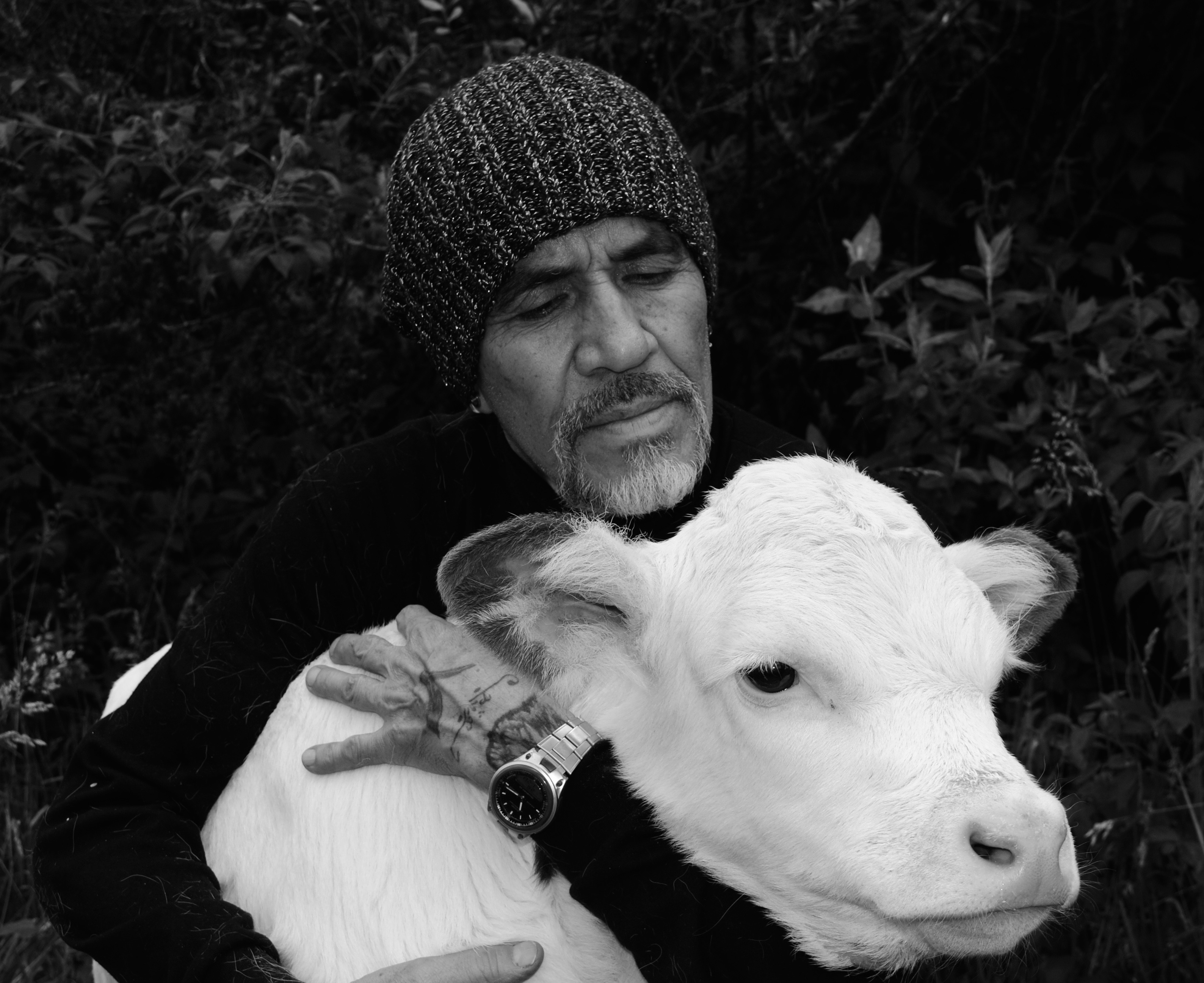

Background information
- Born: Jesús Alfredo Merchán; 24 December 1952 (age 73); Bogotá, Colombia
- Genres: Rock; pop; electronica; jazz
- Occupations: Musician, activist
- Instruments: Double bass; bass guitar
- Years active: 1971–present
- Website: chuchomerchan.com

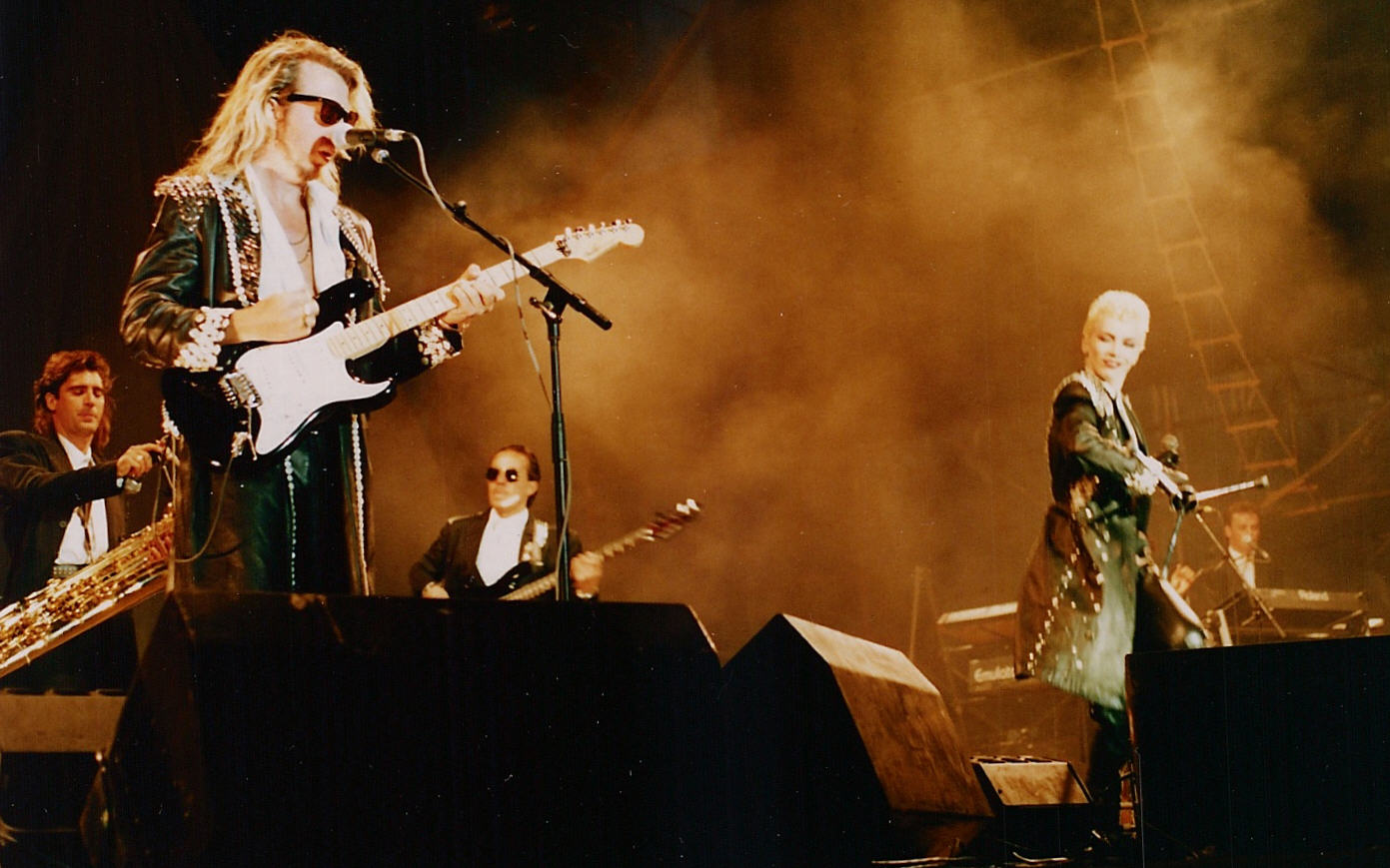
Chucho Merchán (far center) playing bass with Eurythmics in 1987

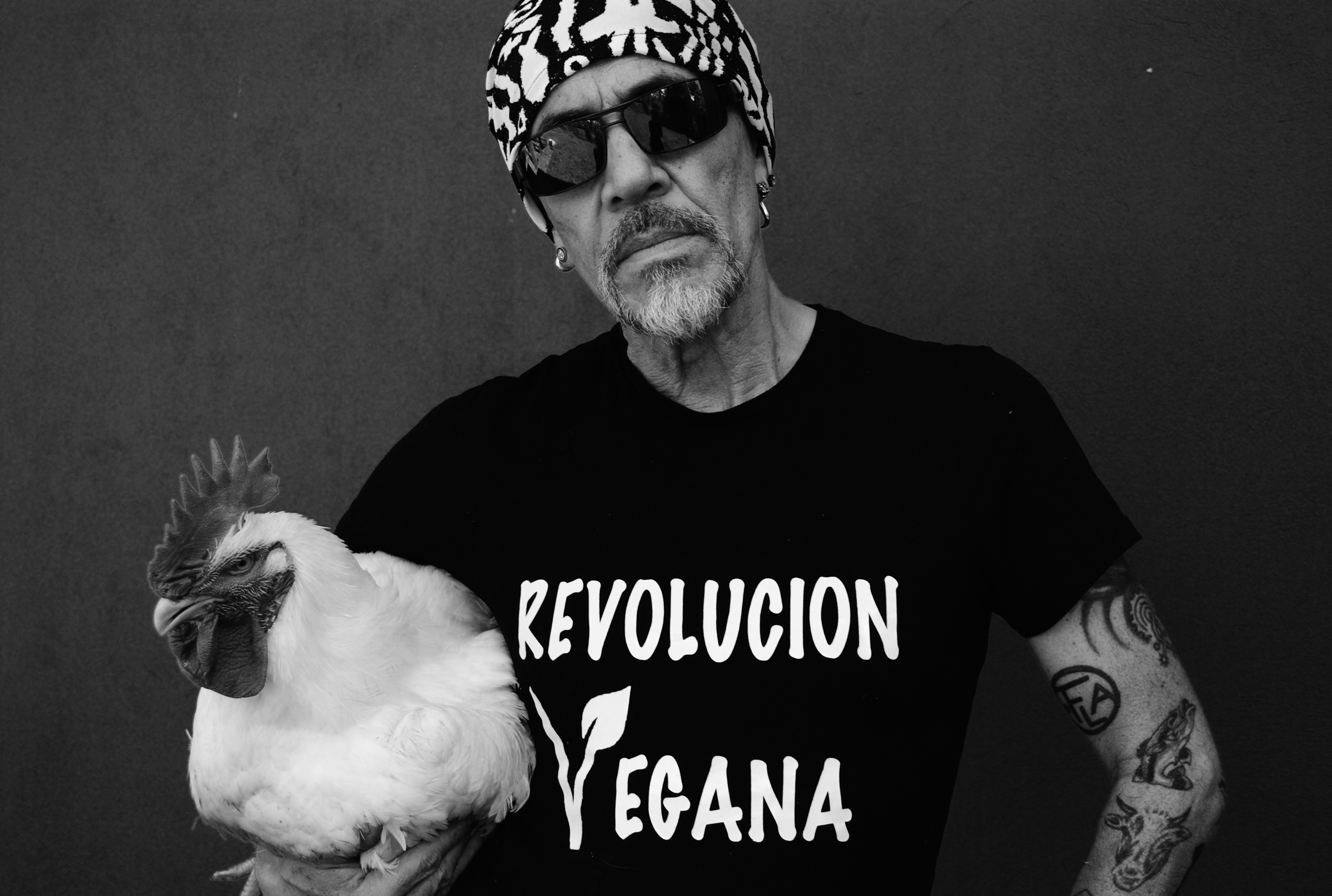
Chucho Merchán with rooster Rod promoting veganism

Jesús Alfredo Merchán (born December 24, 1952), known professionally as Chucho Merchán, is a Colombian session jazz and rock bassist and guitarist. He received a Bachelor of Arts degree from Cambridge University in 1980. He has performed with Nucleus, Eurythmics, The Pretenders, Thomas Dolby, George Harrison, Pete Townshend, David Gilmour, Robi Rosa, Bryan Adams, Kirsty MacColl, Jaguares, Everything but the Girl and Working Week.

His first musical experiences were in South America with his band Malanga and with university bands in California. In 1974 he traveled to England to study music at Cambridge University. He studied composition, orchestration, direction and orchestral conduction, guitar, piano, percussion, and double bass. In 1980 he received his Bachelor of Arts. In the same year, after his graduation, he began to play double bass. His band Macondo, which he founded and for which he composes, won the prize for the best European jazz band. With this band he played at jazz festivals in Montreux and Newport. In Cambridge he received the prize for composition with his string quartet Vientos del Sur. In 1983, he joined the Thomas Dolby band as a guitarist and went on his first world tour promoting the album The Flat Earth.

In 1986, he joined the band The Pretenders with whom he recorded the album Get Close. After the eruption of the Nevado del Ruiz volcano, which destroyed Armero and left 25,000 people dead, he organized a charity concert for the survivors. David Gilmour, Annie Lennox, Pete Townshend, and Mike Oldfield participated in this event.

With the funds acquired, charity works were carried out in Colombia, including a school, a sports center, and a brick factory. This is when FONEVA was born, a charity which he manages and which helps children, elderly people and animals in Colombia.

He conducted The London Philharmonic Orchestra for Pete Townsend's album Iron Man and played bass on Scoop, White City and Deep End Live, and was the musical director on the tour of The Who which celebrated their 25th anniversary. In 1986, he joined Eurythmics on the albums Revenge, We Too Are One and Peace, and toured with the band. He worked with Annie Lennox on her album Diva and on Red Hot and Blue to help victims of AIDS. With Eurythmics, he participated in the concert at Wembley Stadium to push the South African government to release Nelson Mandela. He also collaborated with Eurythmics member Dave Stewart on several tracks for the Lily Was Here soundtrack, released in 1989.

== Discography ==
- Ocean Songs. Independent, 1998
- De regreso a casa. Independent, 2007
- Es ahora o nunca. Independent, 2009
- Mundo al revés. Independent, 2011
- Revolución de conciencia. Independent, 2013
- El pueblo unido. Independent, 2015
- El poder sagrado de la vida. Independent, 2017
- Vystopía. Independent, 2018
- The Voice of Animals. Independent, 2022
