= Pasión (Roberto Alagna album) =

Studio album by Roberto Alagna
- Released: 2011
- Genres: Classical, Latin
- Label: EMI Latin

Pasión is a 2011 crossover album by the tenor Roberto Alagna of Spanish-language standards.

== Track listing ==
1. Piensa En Mi (Agustin Lara)
2. Quizas, Quizas, Quizas
3. Historia De Un Amor, in duo with Lila Downs (written by Carlos Eleta Almarán )
4. La Cumparsita
5. Dos Cruces (Carmelo Larrea)
6. Cielito Lindo
7. La Llorona
8. Besame Mucho
9. Ella (José Alfredo Jiménez song) (José Alfredo Jiménez)
10. Esperanza (Charles Aznavour song)
11. Paloma Negra (Tomas Mendez)
12. El Día Que Me Quieras (song) (Carlos Gardel)
13. Por Una Cabeza (Carlos Gardel)
14. Siboney
15. Bonus track: "Cu Ti Lu Dissi", modern Sicilian song written by Etta Scollo
