= Noche de ronda =

External audio
- You may listen to a performance of Noche de Ronda by the lyric tenor Nestor Mesta Chayres and the Alfredo Antonini Orchestra with John Serry Sr. in 1946 Here

"Noche de ronda" is a waltz written by Mexican songwriter and composer Agustín Lara and published under the pseudonym "María Teresa Lara" (Note: María Teresa Lara is Agustín's younger sister.) in 1935. Mexican singer Elvira Ríos sang the song in the 1937 film ¡Esos hombres!. It became her signature song and one of the biggest hits of her career. She recorded it four times: in 1936, as a 78 rpm single for RCA Victor; in 1940, for her Decca album Tropic Nights; in 1957, for her RCA Victor album Noche de ronda; and in 1974, for her Orfeón album La emocional Elvira Ríos.

Agustín Lara, Pedro Vargas, Lydia Mendoza, Toña la Negra, Xavier Cugat, Nestor Mesta Chayres, Nat King Cole, and Eydie Gormé with Los Panchos have also recorded the song.
