= Tropic Nights =

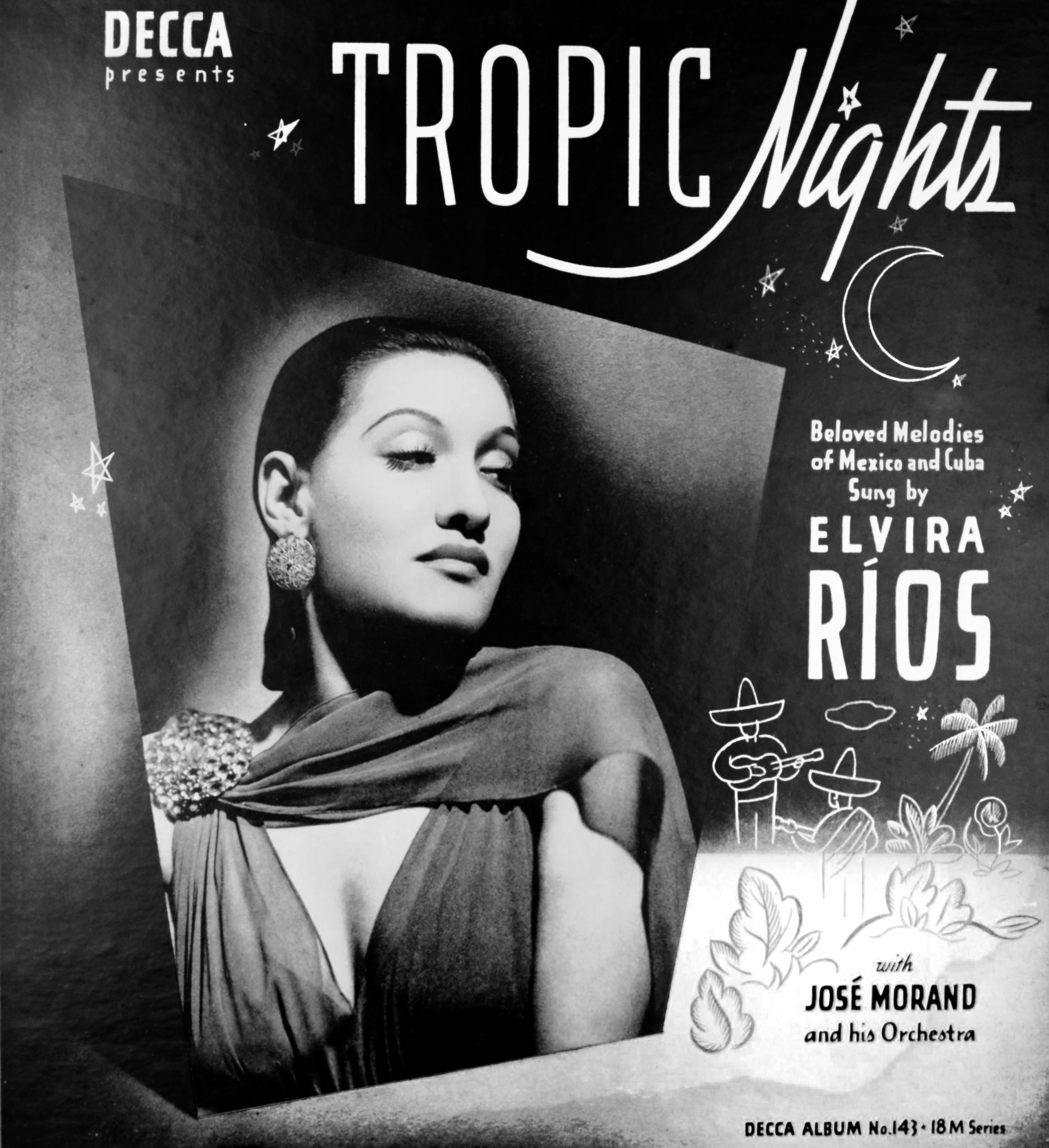

Studio album by Elvira Ríos
- Released: 1940
- Recorded: 21–22 May 1940
- Genre: Bolero; foxtrot; waltz
- Label: Decca

Elvira Ríos chronology
Tropic Nights (1940)	Sensualidad (1952)

Tropic Nights is a studio album by Mexican singer Elvira Ríos, released in 1940 by Decca Records. The album was received positively by critics.

== Critical reception ==
Tropic Nights received positive reviews in the early 1940s. Stage commended both Ríos' performance and Morand's orchestra: "Miss Rios displays perfect diction, great charm, and above all, a lovely voice. The orchestra accompanies in the best Latin tradition". Harper's Bazaar described the album's tracks as "Mexican and Cuban melodies smolderingly interpreted by Elvira Rios". Commonweal recommended it: "Decca has a good album called Tropic Nights, Mexican songs suavely delivered by Elvira Rios".

Decca reissued the album in the late 1940s and 1950s. In his 1947 book Records for Pleasure, music editor John Ball, Jr. wrote: "Miss Rios has mastered completely the intimate style of half-voice singing that can make of a Spanish song a most potent and intoxicating brew". In 1952, High Fidelity reviewed the album and highlighted Ríos' talent and prestige:

"If you enjoy Latin American music in a quiet vocal presentation, you may enjoy this record. Miss Rios brings admirable restraint of performance to these eight south-of-the-border standards and takes her place as an outstanding vocalist along with some of the well-known [Mexican] males: Nestor Chayres, Tito Guizar, and others".

== Track listing ==
Disc 18082
No.	Title	Writer(s)	Recorded	Length
1.	"Tú no comprendes" (You Don't Understand)	Rafael Hernández	21 May 1940
2.	"Perfidia" (Tonight)	Alberto Domínguez	21 May 1940

Disc 18083
No.	Title	Writer(s)	Recorded	Length
3.	"Flores negras"	Sergio De Karlo	21 May 1940
4.	"Farolito"	Agustín Lara	22 May 1940

Disc 18084
No.	Title	Writer(s)	Recorded	Length
5.	"Noche de ronda"	María Teresa Lara	22 May 1940
6.	"Murmullo" (Let Me Whisper)	Electo Rosell	22 May 1940

Disc 18085
No.	Title	Writer(s)	Recorded	Length
7.	"Vereda tropical" (Havana For A Night)	Juan Peso; Gonzalo Curiel	21 May 1940
8.	"Te vi pasar"	Agustín Lara	22 May 1940
