= Flores negras =

Song
- Language: Spanish
- English title: Black Flowers
- Published: 1937
- Genre: Bolero
- Songwriter: Sergio De Karlo

"Flores negras" ("Black Flowers") is a bolero song written and composed by Cuban musician Sergio De Karlo and published in 1937. It was introduced by Mexican tenor Pedro Vargas in the 1937 film Los chicos de la prensa. Vargas recorded it for RCA Victor.

"Flores negras" is also one of the greatest hits of Mexican singer Elvira Ríos, who popularized the song in the United States and South America. She first recorded "Flores negras" on 21 May 1940 in New York City for Decca Records. She sang it in 1942 Argentine film Ven... mi corazón te llama, and later rerecorded the song in Mexico for RCA Victor in 1963 and Orfeón in 1974.

The song has also been recorded by Lydia Mendoza (1937), Bing Crosby (1941), Eydie Gormé with Los Panchos (1965), Elvira Quintana (1965), Irma Serrano (1973), Julio Jaramillo, and Ana Gabriel (2000).
