= The End of the Day =

1939 film by Julien Duvivier

- Directed by: Julien Duvivier
- Written by: Julien Duvivier; Charles Spaak
- Starring: Victor Francen; Michel Simon; Madeleine Ozeray; Louis Jouvet
- Cinematography: Alex Joffre; Christian Matras; Armand Thirard
- Edited by: Marthe Poncin
- Music by: Maurice Jaubert
- Production company: Regina Films
- Distributed by: Juno
- Release date: 24 March 1939
- Running time: 99 minutes
- Country: France
- Language: French

The End of the Day (French: La Fin du jour) is a 1939 French drama film directed by Julien Duvivier and starring Victor Francen, Michel Simon, Madeleine Ozeray and Louis Jouvet. It was shot at the Epinay Studios in Paris and on location around the city as well as at the Château de Lourmarin in Provence. The film's sets were designed by the art director Jacques Krauss.

== Plot ==
Monsieur St. Clair, an aging romantic leading man, has decided to retire from the stage, but he is broke and goes to an old-age home for elderly actors. There he meets the other retired actors, all of whom know each other from having worked the same places over the years. One actor, Marny, is a melancholy soul primarily because years ago his wife left him to have a fling with St. Clair and died of a self-inflicted gunshot wound. As an actor Marny was brilliant, but he never got the recognition he deserved, nor anything like the popularity of St. Clair. The third main protagonist of the film, Cabrissade, is a prankster and free spirit who played mostly understudy roles during his career, and never got the chance to star.

Being actors they are each full of themselves in their own way. However, they are all equally dependent on this charitable retirement home for their support. Cabrissade, however, delights in defying the management's rules and playing practical jokes on both staff and residents alike. Unknown to him or any resident, the retirement home is nearly bankrupt, and the management plans to close it.

A 17-year old local barmaid, Jeanette, becomes infatuated with St. Clair, who woos her the way he has wooed many others before. However, she sees St. Clair only as a famous romantic and not the pompous self-absorbed has-been that he really is. Marny, her platonic older friend, burns as he watches the girl fall under St. Clair's spell. However, when St. Clair comes into some money he leaves her behind and goes to Monte Carlo to blow it all.

As the retirement home slides downhill, privileges like electricity after 9 pm and evening wine are suspended, which prompts Cabrissade to lead a revolt of the residents against the management. But as they express their demands for better treatment, the director informs them that the home will be closing and they will be split up and transferred to other homes. This is frightening to the group of actors, who really have nothing in common with ordinary folk.

One couple who have been together for 35 years decide to marry as it will ensure they can stay together. At the after-wedding party, the director announces that he has succeeded in obtaining financing to keep the home open. It is decided to put on a play for the new benefactors.

St. Clair returns home broke and immediately begins to pursue the young barmaid again. His ego is stroked as she professes that she would die for him. He presses her to prove her love, and a plan is made.

The play goes on, and it is demanded that Marny play the lead role—a role which Cabrissade longs to perform. Cabrissade appeals to Marny to allow him to play the role, but Marny scoffs at the idea. As the pleading becomes more intense there is a tussle and Marny falls unconscious. Cabrissade dresses himself in Marny's costume and takes the stage. However, immediately upon seeing the audience he is struck by stage fright and cannot say his lines. The production stops and Cabrissade is deeply humiliated. Later, Marny performs the part.

Cabrissade realises he has been fooling himself all his life, and in despair he dies.

St. Clair goes to the bar to find Jeanette, having manage to convince her to kill herself with a stolen gun, leaving a note explaining she felt unable to live without him, all to prove to himself that he still has power over women at his advanced age. However, Marny is there already, discussing how the resumed play had gone. As he speaks with St. Clair he realises what Jeanette is about to do and rushes upstairs to stop her. There is a shot, but no one has been hit. Marny is furious with St. Clair for trying to cause another person to die like his wife. However, back downstairs St. Clair has descended into madness, performing scenes from Don Juan as if he were living them right there.

St. Clair is sent to an asylum. Marny reads a eulogy for Cabrissade written by Cabrissade himself. Marny bites his lip as he reads Cabrissade's overly gushing description of his own great talents, until he cannot go any further. At that point, he speaks instead from the heart about Cabrissade's short-falls as an actor, but love and loyalty to the theatre and his nobility at following this path. The assembled mourners appreciate his speech.

== Accolades ==
The film won Best Foreign Film at the US 1939 National Board of Review Awards, and came second at the 1939 New York Film Critics Circle Awards.

== Cast ==
- Victor Francen as Marny
- Michel Simon as Cabrissade
- Louis Jouvet as Raphaël Saint Clair
- Madeleine Ozeray as Jeanette
- Alexandre Arquillière as Monsieur Lucien
- Jean Joffre as Philémon
- Sylvie as Madame Tusini
- Arthur Devère as the director
- Charles Granval as Deaubonne
- Pierre Magnier as Laroche
- Savinie Lherbay as Madame Philémon
- Jean Coquelin as Delormel
- Auguste Boverio as the priest
- Jean Ayme as Victor
- Tony Jacquot as Pierrot
- Gaby André as Danielle
- Gaston Jacquet as Lacour
- Maurice Schutz as Verneul
- Blanche Denège as Sœur Théoneste
