= Ninotchka =

1939 American film by Ernst Lubitsch

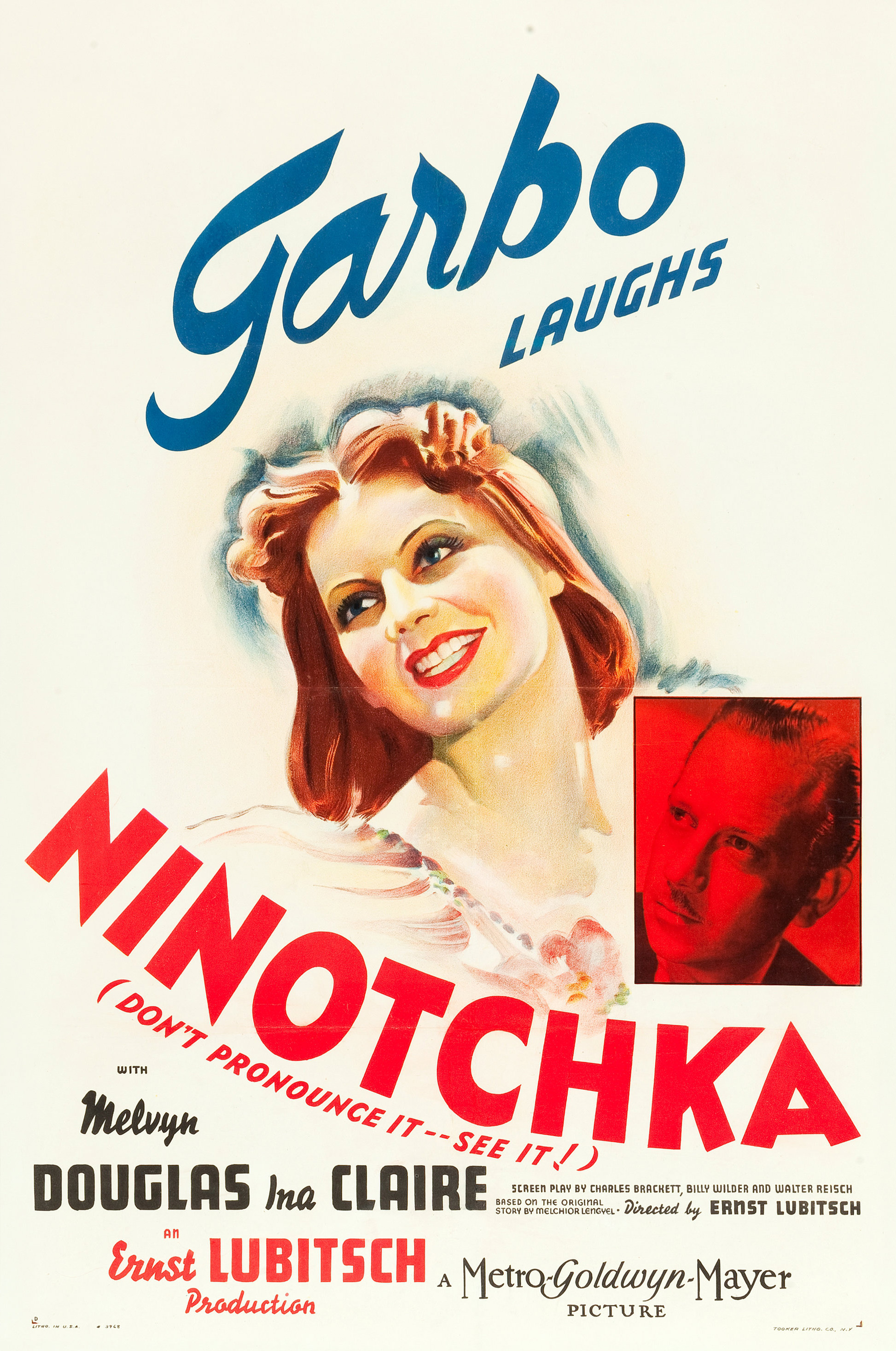
- Theatrical release poster
- Directed by: Ernst Lubitsch
- Screenplay by: Charles Brackett; Billy Wilder; Walter Reisch
- Story by: Melchior Lengyel
- Produced by: Ernst Lubitsch; Sidney Franklin
- Starring: Greta Garbo; Melvyn Douglas; Ina Claire
- Cinematography: William H. Daniels
- Edited by: Gene Ruggiero
- Music by: Werner R. Heymann
- Distributed by: Metro-Goldwyn-Mayer
- Release date: November 9, 1939
- Running time: 110 minutes
- Country: United States
- Language: English
- Budget: $1.4 million (est.)
- Box office: $2.3 million

Ninotchka is a 1939 American romantic comedy film made by Metro-Goldwyn-Mayer, produced and directed by Ernst Lubitsch and stars Greta Garbo and Melvyn Douglas. The film was written by Billy Wilder, Charles Brackett and Walter Reisch, based on a story by Melchior Lengyel. Ninotchka marked the first comedy role for Garbo, and her penultimate film; she received her fourth and final Academy Award nomination for Best Actress.

In 1990, Ninotchka was selected for preservation in the United States National Film Registry by the Library of Congress as being "culturally, historically, or aesthetically significant". It has been listed as one of the greatest films of all time by Empire in 2008 and Time in 2011.

== Plot ==
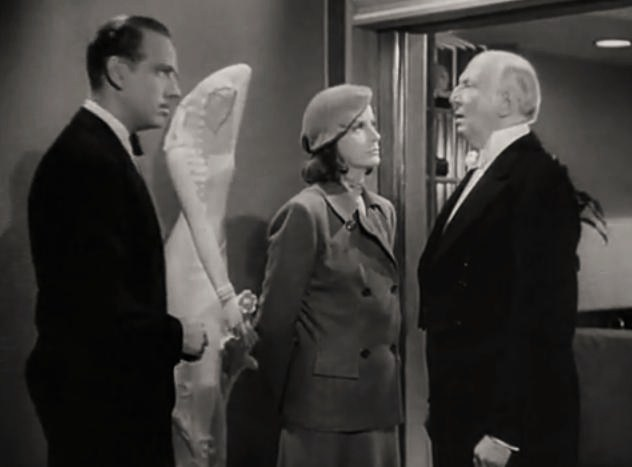
Melvyn Douglas, Greta Garbo and Richard Carle

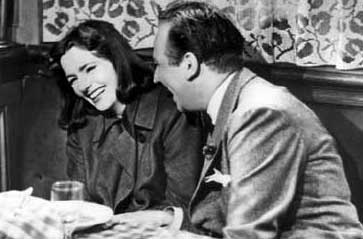
Greta Garbo and Melvyn Douglas

Iranoff, Buljanoff and Kopalski, three agents from the Soviet Board of Trade, arrive in Paris to sell jewelry confiscated from the aristocracy during the Russian Revolution of 1917.

Count Alexis Rakonin, a White Russian nobleman reduced to employment as a waiter in the hotel where the trio are staying, overhears details of their mission and informs the former Russian Grand Duchess Swana that her family jewels are to be sold by the three men. Swana's debonair paramour, Count Léon d'Algout, offers to help retrieve the jewelry before it is sold.

In their hotel suite, Iranoff, Buljanoff and Kopalski are negotiating with Mercier, a prominent Parisian jeweler, when Léon interrupts the meeting. He explains that the jewels were seized illegally by the Soviet government and a petition has been filed in Paris preventing their sale or removal. Mercier withdraws his offer to purchase the jewelry until the lawsuit is settled.

The charming Léon treats the three Russians to an extravagant lunch, gets them drunk and wins their friendship and confidence. He sends a telegram in their name to their superior, Commissar Razinin in Moscow, suggesting a compromise.

Displeased by the telegram, Razinin sends special envoy Nina Ivanovna "Ninotchka" Yakushova to Paris. Ninotchka's goal is to win the lawsuit, complete the jewelry sale and return with the three renegade Russians. Ninotchka is methodical, rigid and stern, chastising Iranoff, Buljanoff and Kopalski for failing to complete their mission.

Ninotchka and Léon first meet on the street near the hotel, their identities unknown to one another. He flirts, but she is uninterested. Intrigued, Léon follows her to the Eiffel Tower and shows her his home through a telescope. Ninotchka tells him he might be an interesting subject of study and suggests they go to his apartment.

At his apartment, Léon tells Ninotchka he finds her fascinating and believes that he is falling in love with her; she acknowledges they share a mutual chemical attraction. They begin to kiss, but are interrupted by a phone call from Buljanoff. Both then realize they are each other's adversaries over the jewelry and Ninotchka promptly leaves, despite Léon's protestations.

The next day, Léon follows Ninotchka to a working class bistro where she again rebuffs him. However, after several attempts at making her laugh, Léon finally breaks down her resistance and she falls in love with him. While attending to the various legal matters over the lawsuit, Ninotchka gradually becomes seduced by the West. At a dinner date with Léon where she unexpectedly meets Swana face-to-face (her rival for the jewelry and for Léon's affections), Ninotchka consumes champagne for the first time and quickly becomes intoxicated. The following afternoon, a hungover Ninotchka is awakened by Swana and discovers Rakonin has stolen the jewelry during the night. Swana has come to offer Ninotchka a proposition: the jewels will be returned and the litigation dropped if Ninotchka returns to Moscow immediately so that Swana can have Léon to herself. Ninotchka reluctantly agrees to Swana's proposal and, after completing the sale of the jewelry to Mercier, she, Iranoff, Buljanoff and Kopalski fly back to Russia. Later that evening, Léon visits Swana and confesses his love for Ninotchka. Swana then informs Léon that Ninotchka has already left for Moscow. He attempts to follow her but is denied a Russian visa, because of his nobility.

Sometime later in Moscow, Ninotchka invites her three comrades to dinner at her communal apartment and they nostalgically recall their time in Paris. After dinner, Ninotchka finally receives a letter from Léon, but it has been completely censored by the authorities, and she is devastated.

More time passes. Commissar Razinin informs Ninotchka that Iranoff, Buljanoff and Kopalski have failed in their latest assignment to sell furs in Constantinople. Against her wishes, Razinin once again orders Ninotchka to investigate the situation and retrieve the trio.

After Ninotchka arrives in Constantinople, her three comrades inform her that they have opened a restaurant and will not be returning to the Soviet Union. When Ninotchka asks them who is responsible for this idea, Buljanoff points to the balcony where Léon is standing. Léon explains that he was barred from entering Russia to win Ninotchka back, so he and the three Russians conspired to get her to leave the country. He asks her to stay with him and she happily agrees.

The final shot in the film is of Kopalski carrying a protest sign complaining that Iranoff and Buljanoff are unfair, because, unlike theirs, his name does not illuminate on the electric sign in front of their new restaurant.

== Cast ==
Ninotchka trailer

- Greta Garbo as Nina Ivanovna "Ninotchka" Yakushova
- Melvyn Douglas as Count Léon d'Algout
- Ina Claire as Grand Duchess Swana
- Bela Lugosi as Commissar Razinin
- Sig Ruman (as Sig Rumann) as Iranoff
- Felix Bressart as Buljanoff
- Alexander Granach as Kopalski
- Gregory Gaye as Count Alexis Rakonin
- Rolfe Sedan as hotel manager
- Edwin Maxwell as Mercier
- Richard Carle as Gaston
- Tamara Shayne as Anna (uncredited)
- George Tobias as Russian visa official (uncredited)
- Charles Judels as Père Mathieu, the café owner (uncredited)
- George Davis as railway station porter (uncredited)
- Edwin Stanley as Soviet lawyer (uncredited)
- Dorothy Adams as Jacqueline, Swana's maid (uncredited)
- Harry Semels as Gurganov, the silent neighbor (uncredited)
- Paul Weigel as Vladimir (uncredited)

== Release ==
Ninotchka was released in late 1939, shortly after the outbreak of World War II in Europe, where it became a great success. It was banned in the Soviet Union and its satellites. It went on to make $2.279 million worldwide. US: $1.187 million. International: $1.092 million. Profit: $138,000.

In a play on the famous "Garbo Talks!" ad campaign used for her "talkie" debut in Anna Christie (1930), Ninotchka was marketed with the catchphrase "Garbo Laughs!", commenting on Garbo's largely somber and melancholy image (though Garbo laughs several times in many of her previous pictures).

== Reception ==
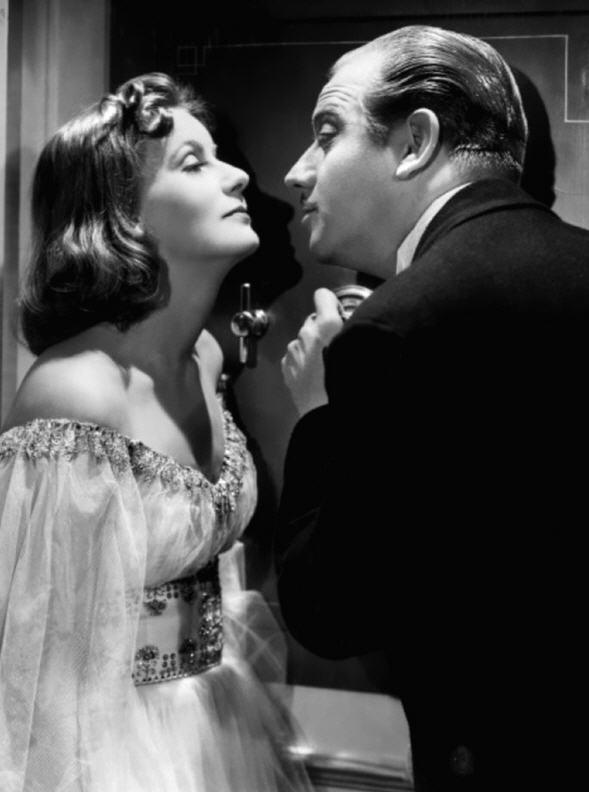
Greta Garbo as Nina Ivanovna "Ninotchka" Yakushova and Melvyn Douglas as Count Léon d'Algout

=== Critical response ===
When the film was shown at the Radio City Music Hall, The New York Times film critic Frank S. Nugent praised it:

The comedy, through Mr. Douglas's debonair performance and those of Ina Claire as the duchess and Sig Ruman, Felix Bressart and Alexander Granach as the unholy three emissaries; through Mr. Lubitsch's facile direction; and through the cleverly written script of Walter Reisch, Charles Brackett and Billy Wilder, has come off brilliantly. Stalin, we repeat, won't like it; but, unless your tastes hew too closely to the party line, we think you will, immensely.

=== Awards and nominations ===
Award	Category	Nominee(s)	Result	Ref.
Academy Awards	Outstanding Production	Metro-Goldwyn-Mayer	Nominated	
Academy Awards	Best Actress	Greta Garbo	Nominated	
Academy Awards	Best Story	Melchior Lengyel	Nominated	
Academy Awards	Best Screenplay	Charles Brackett, Walter Reisch and Billy Wilder	Nominated	
National Board of Review Awards	Top Ten Films		4th Place	
National Board of Review Awards	Best Acting	Greta Garbo	Won	
National Film Preservation Board	National Film Registry		Inducted	
New York Film Critics Circle Awards	Best Director	Ernst Lubitsch	Nominated	
New York Film Critics Circle Awards	Best Actress	Greta Garbo	Nominated	

Ninotchka is recognized as well by the American Film Institute in the AFI 100 Years... series in the following lists:

- 2000: AFI's 100 Years...100 Laughs – #52
- 2002: AFI's 100 Years...100 Passions – #40

=== Origins ===
Ninotchka is based on a three-sentence story idea by Melchior Lengyel that made its debut at a poolside conference in 1937, when a suitable comedy vehicle for Garbo was being sought by MGM: "Russian girl saturated with Bolshevist ideals goes to fearful, capitalistic, monopolistic Paris. She meets romance and has an uproarious good time. Capitalism not so bad, after all."

=== Revival ===
An attempt by MGM to release Ninotchka later during World War II was suppressed on the grounds that the Soviets were then allies of the West. The film was released after the war ended.

=== Legacy ===
In 1955, the musical Silk Stockings, based on Ninotchka, opened on Broadway. Written by Cole Porter, the stage production was based on Ninotchka's story and script and starred Hildegard Neff and Don Ameche. MGM then produced a 1957 film version of the musical directed by Rouben Mamoulian and starring Fred Astaire and Cyd Charisse. Actor George Tobias, who appeared uncredited in Ninotchka as the Soviet visa official, is featured in Silk Stockings as Commissar Markovitch. Rolfe Sedan, who portrayed the hotel manager in Ninotchka, appears uncredited as a stage manager in Silk Stockings. The MGM films Comrade X (1940), starring Clark Gable and Hedy Lamarr, and The Iron Petticoat (1956), starring Bob Hope and Katharine Hepburn, both borrow heavily from Ninotchka.

MGM had scheduled Madame Curie as Garbo's next film, but pleased with the success of Ninotchka, the studio quickly decided to team Garbo and Douglas in another romantic comedy. Two-Faced Woman (1941) was the result and Garbo received the worst reviews of her entire career. It turned out to be her final film and Greer Garson eventually starred in Madame Curie.

On the review aggregator website Rotten Tomatoes, 95% of 39 critics' reviews are positive, with an average rating of 8.8/10. The website's consensus reads: "With Greta Garbo proving her comedy chops in the twilight of her career, Ninotchka is a can't-miss classic."

The Japanese filmmaker Akira Kurosawa cited Ninotchka as one of his favorite films.

Filipino writer and activist Ninotchka Rosca revealed during a 1966 Philippine congressional hearing that her pen name was inspired by the film.

Nazi German Reich Minister of Propaganda Joseph Goebbels remarked in his meeting notes on June 9, 1940 that "The German press should go and see the excellent American anti-Soviet film Ninotchka." He would later tell multiple German actors that he thought it was one of the best films he had ever seen. During the 1948 Italian general election the US State Department encouraged film distributors to show the film as a means of countering the increasingly popular Italian Communist Party.

=== Cultural influences ===
"Colonel Ninotchka" was a character in the 1980s women's professional wrestling promotion, Gorgeous Ladies of Wrestling.
