= Elvira Ríos =

Mexican singer and actress (1913–1987)

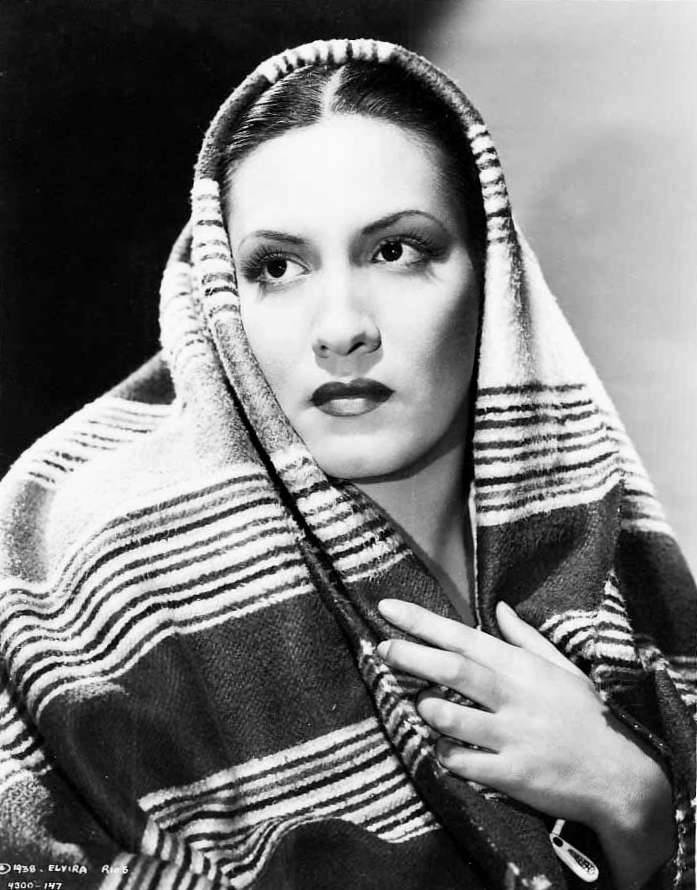
- Ríos as Yakima in Stagecoach (1939)

Background information
- Born: María Elvira Gallegos Ríos; November 16, 1913; Mexico City, Mexico
- Died: January 13, 1987 (aged 73) Mexico City, Mexico
- Genres: Bolero; waltz; foxtrot
- Occupations: Singer; actress
- Instrument: Vocals
- Labels: RCA Víctor; Decca; Musart; Orfeón

María Elvira Gallegos Ríos (November 16, 1913 – January 13, 1987) was a Mexican singer and actress.

One of the most notable performers of Agustín Lara's songs, Ríos was the first Mexican singer who achieved international success through radio, records, nightclub engagements, tours, and films. She was well known in Mexico, United States, Brazil, Argentina, and France, among other countries. Some of her greatest hits are "Noche de ronda", "Flores negras", "Perfidia", "Desesperadamente", and "Ausencia".

== Birth and family ==
Ríos was born on November 16, 1913, in La Lagunilla, a neighborhood of central Mexico City. She was the firstborn child of José María Gallegos Villalobos and María Guadalupe Ríos Rodríguez. She had a younger brother, José Gallegos Ríos (d. 1993), and a younger sister, Soledad Gallegos Ríos (d. 1981).

== Career ==
According to one source, Ríos was discovered by Agustín Lara when the songwriter heard her singing in a nightclub in Mexico City. After hearing the great imitation she was able to make of him (with her deep contralto voice), he invited her to his house and promised to make her a great star. However, another source says that she became one of the main performers of the XEW station after she auditioned for Emilio Azcárraga Vidaurreta, who immediately signed her for three daily 15-minute spots; this happened in 1936. She made her record debut singing "Pensaba que tu amor" and "Cachito de sol" with Lara.

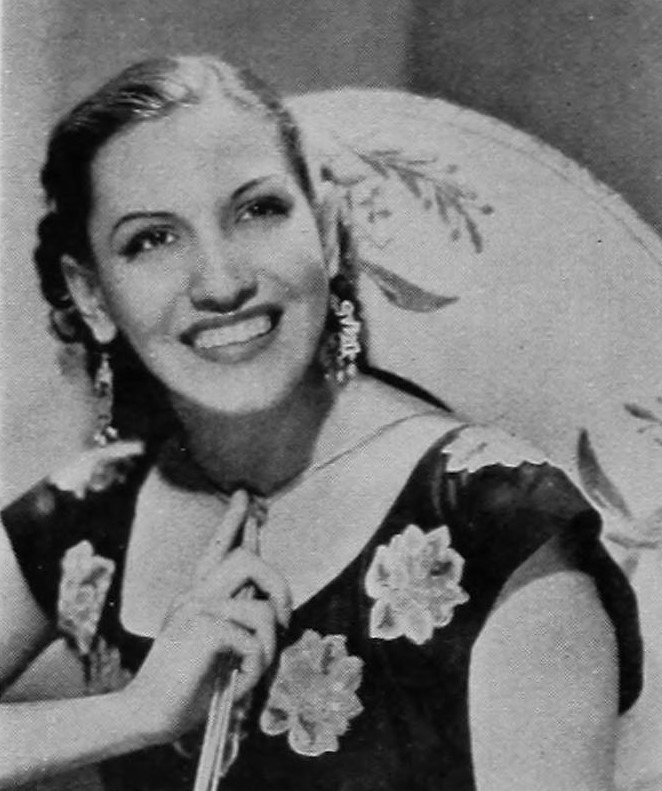
Elvira Ríos in 1938, when she performed over the NBC station

She made her debut in Mexican films singing "Noche de ronda" in ¡Esos hombres! (released in 1937). Manuel Reachi, an assistant to Paramount Pictures producer Arthur Hornblow Jr., discovered her singing over XEW and took her to Hollywood to appear in the musical Tropic Holiday, where she sang songs by Lara and played Tito Guízar's sister. She was then chosen to play a young Apache woman named Yakima in John Ford's Stagecoach. In March 1938, NBC signed her as a sustaining artist and gave her her own 15-minute program every Thursday with Frank Hodek's orchestra. Her success on the West Coast led her to New York City, where she performed at the popular nightclub La Martinique and began a series of recordings for the Decca label. In 1941 she became the headline act at the Copacabana nightclub in Manhattan with dancer Patricia Bowman. After New York, she performed in Miami at the Miami-Biltmore Hotel with Maximillian Bergere's orchestra.

Her last appearances in Hollywood were as the leading lady of singer and actor Ray Whitley in the short film Cupid Rides the Range (1939) and as a Filipino woman in The Real Glory (1940).

The first film she made in Argentina was Ven mi corazón te llama (1942), in which she played the mysterious and fascinating Sombra Rey, a fictional Mexican bolero singer.

She returned to Mexican cinema with a starring role in Murallas de pasión (1944) with Isabela Corona and Alberto Galán.

She also starred in the Argentine film El tango vuelve a París (1948) with tango singer Alberto Castillo and bandoneonist Aníbal Troilo, among others.

In the early 1950s she recorded Sensualidad, one of her first studio albums, for the Mexican independent label Discos Musart. This LP record includes eight tracks with Don Americo's orchestra.

In 1957, she released her first studio album for RCA Victor, Noche de ronda. She rerecorded several of her classic hits, including "Noche de ronda", "Janitzio", and "Noche de luna". The album also includes a medley of Guty Cárdenas songs, Paul Misraki's "Una mujer", and Agustín Lara's "Santa", among other songs. A year later, she appeared in the musical film Melodías inolvidables (released in 1959), singing "Noche de ronda" and "Noche de luna".

In 1960, she recorded her second album for RCA Victor, Ausencia, accompanied by Gonzalo "Chalo" Cervera's orchestra and pianist Pepe Agüeros. The title track is a María Grever composition. The album also includes a new recording of Ríos' big 1940s hit "Desesperadamente", as well as the Agustín Lara standards "Rival" and "Amor de mis amores" and José Alfredo Jiménez' Mexican folk song "Qué bonito amor".

On November 18, 1961, she became "the first non-U.S. performer" to perform in the show of the National Press Club's annual President's Black Tie Ball in Washington, D.C.

Her third RCA Victor album, La emocional Elvira Ríos, was also released in the 1960s. It features a new recording of "Flores negras", one of her signature songs; Agustín Lara's "Azul"; Alfonso Torres' "Pensando en ti"; and an Alberto Domínguez medley, "Frenesí-Perfidia", among other songs. For this album she also recorded two American pop songs—"All the Things You Are" and "Once in a While"—in English.

She remained with RCA Victor until December 1973, when she signed a recording contract with the Orfeón label. In 1974, she recorded her first Orfeón album, La emocional Elvira Ríos, accompanied by Chucho Zarzosa's orchestra. In 1979, Orfeón released a 3-LP compilation with 30 of Elvira Ríos' hits.

== Death ==
Ríos died of kidney failure and bladder cancer at her home in Coyoacán on January 13, 1987. Her remains were cremated at the Panteón Civil de Dolores.

== Discography ==
=== Singles ===
Vocalion

- "Pensaba que tu amor" with Agustín Lara (1936)
- "Cachito de sol" with Agustín Lara (1936)

RCA Victor (Mexico)

- "Janitzio" (1936)
- "Desesperanza" (1936)
- "Por qué no he de quererte" (1936)
- "Muchacha del alma" (1936)
- "No faltaba más" (1936)
- "Quién" (1936)
- "Ya no te quiero" (1936)
- "Noche de ronda" (1936)

Decca (US)

- "Si te vas" (1938)
- "Mía nomás" (1938)
- "Qué te importa" (1938)
- "Anoche" (1938)
- "En silencio" (1939)
- "Volverás" (1939)
- "Caminos de ayer" (1939)
- "Noche de luna" (1939)
- "Incertidumbre" (1940)
- "Lejos de ti" (1940)
- "Vuelve" (1940)
- "Ven acá" (1940)
- "No te importe saber" (1940)
- "Fidelidad" (1940)
- "Vereda tropical" (1940)
- "Perfidia" (1940)
- "Tú no comprendes" (1940)
- "Flores negras" (1940)
- "Te vi pasar" (1940)
- "Noche de ronda" (1940)
- "Murmullo" (1940)
- "Farolito" (1940)
- "Star Dust" (1940)
- "Time on My Hands" (1940)
- "I'll Never Smile Again" (1940)
- "My Melancholy Baby" (1940)
- "Aquella noche" (1940)
- "Desesperadamente" (1940)
- "Triste camino" (1940)
- "El organillero" (1940)
- "Vuelve" (1941)
- "Jamás" (1941)
- "Oración Caribe" (1941)
- "Noche criolla" (1941)
- "Cuatro vidas" (1941)
- "Buenas noches" (1941)
- "Visión tropical" (1941)
- "Sin ti" (1941)

Columbia (Spain)

- "Frenesí" (1950)
- "Sin motivo" (1950)
- "Triste verdad" (1950)
- "Miedo de ti" (1950)
- "Pensando en ti" (1950)
- "No es un capricho" (1950)

=== Studio albums ===
Year	Title	Label	Catalog number
1940	Tropic Nights	Decca	Album No. 143
1952	Sensualidad	Musart	M127
1957	Noche de ronda	RCA Víctor	MKL-1074
1960	Ausencia... vol. II	RCA Víctor	MKL-1290
1963	La emocional... vol. III	RCA Víctor	MKL-1489
1974	La emocional Elvira Ríos	Orfeón	LP13-2086

=== Compilation albums ===
Year	Title	Label	Catalog number
1953	Tropic Nights	Decca	DL 5238
1979	Joyas musicales en 30 éxitos originales de Elvira Ríos	Orfeón	JM-265
1975	Elvira Rios e seus primeiros sucessos	MCA (Decca)	4-07-404-089
1986	Estilos	MCA (Decca)	81026
1995	Nostalgia	Orfeón	25CDN-518

== Filmography ==
Year	Title	Role	Notes
1937	¡Esos hombres!	Singer	Song: "Noche de ronda"
1938	Tropic Holiday	Rosa	
1939	Stagecoach	Yakima	Uncredited
1939	Cupid Rides the Range	Lolita Morales	18-minute short
1939	The Real Glory	Mrs. Yabo	Uncredited
1942	Ven... mi corazón te llama	Sombra Rey	Songs: "Acércate más", "Flores negras", and "Desesperadamente"
1944	Murallas de pasión	María	
1948	El tango vuelve a París	Lupe Torres	Songs: "La barca de oro" and "Perfidia"
1959	Melodías inolvidables	Singer	Songs: "Noche de ronda" and "Noche de luna", (final film role)
