= Piensa en mí =

Song written by Agustín Lara and Maria Teresa Lara

"Piensa en mí", is a 1935 song written by Agustín Lara and his sister Maria Teresa Lara. It was popularized in the 1948 film Revancha.

== Versions ==
- Chavela Vargas in her album Noche de Ronda 1961
- Luz Casal in her album A Contraluz and on the soundtrack of Pedro Almodóvar's High Heels 1991
- Marinella on Me Varka To Tragoudi 1999
- Pink Martini with Chavela Vargas on Splendor in the Grass (album) 2009
- Pasión (Roberto Alagna album) 2011
- Natalia Lafourcade on Mujer Divina – Homenaje a Agustín Lara 2012
