= National Board of Review Awards 1939 =

Annual US film awards ceremony

11th National Board of Review Awards

December 24, 1939

The 11th National Board of Review Awards were announced on 24 December 1939.

== Top Ten Films ==
- Confessions of a Nazi Spy
- Wuthering Heights
- Stagecoach
- Ninotchka
- Young Mr. Lincoln
- Crisis
- Goodbye, Mr. Chips
- Mr. Smith Goes to Washington
- The Roaring Twenties
- U-Boat 29

== Top Foreign Films ==
- Le quai des brumes (Port of Shadows), France
- Regain (Harvest), France
- Alexander Nevsky, USSR
- La Fin du jour (The End of the Day), France
- Robert Koch, der Bekämpfer des Todes (Robert Koch: The Battle Against Death), Germany

== Winners ==
- Best Film: Confessions of a Nazi Spy
- Best Foreign Language Film: Le quai des brumes (Port of Shadows), France
- Best Acting:
  - James Cagney - The Roaring Twenties
  - Bette Davis - Dark Victory and The Old Maid
  - Geraldine Fitzgerald - Dark Victory and Wuthering Heights
  - Henry Fonda - Young Mr. Lincoln
  - Jean Gabin - Le quai des brumes (Port of Shadows)
  - Greta Garbo - Ninotchka
  - Francis Lederer - Confessions of a Nazi Spy
  - Paul Lukas - Confessions of a Nazi Spy
  - Thomas Mitchell - Stagecoach
  - Laurence Olivier - Wuthering Heights
  - Flora Robson - We Are Not Alone
  - Michel Simon - Le quai des brumes (Port of Shadows) and La Fin du jour (The End of the Day)
