= Wuthering Heights (1939 film) =

1939 film by William Wyler

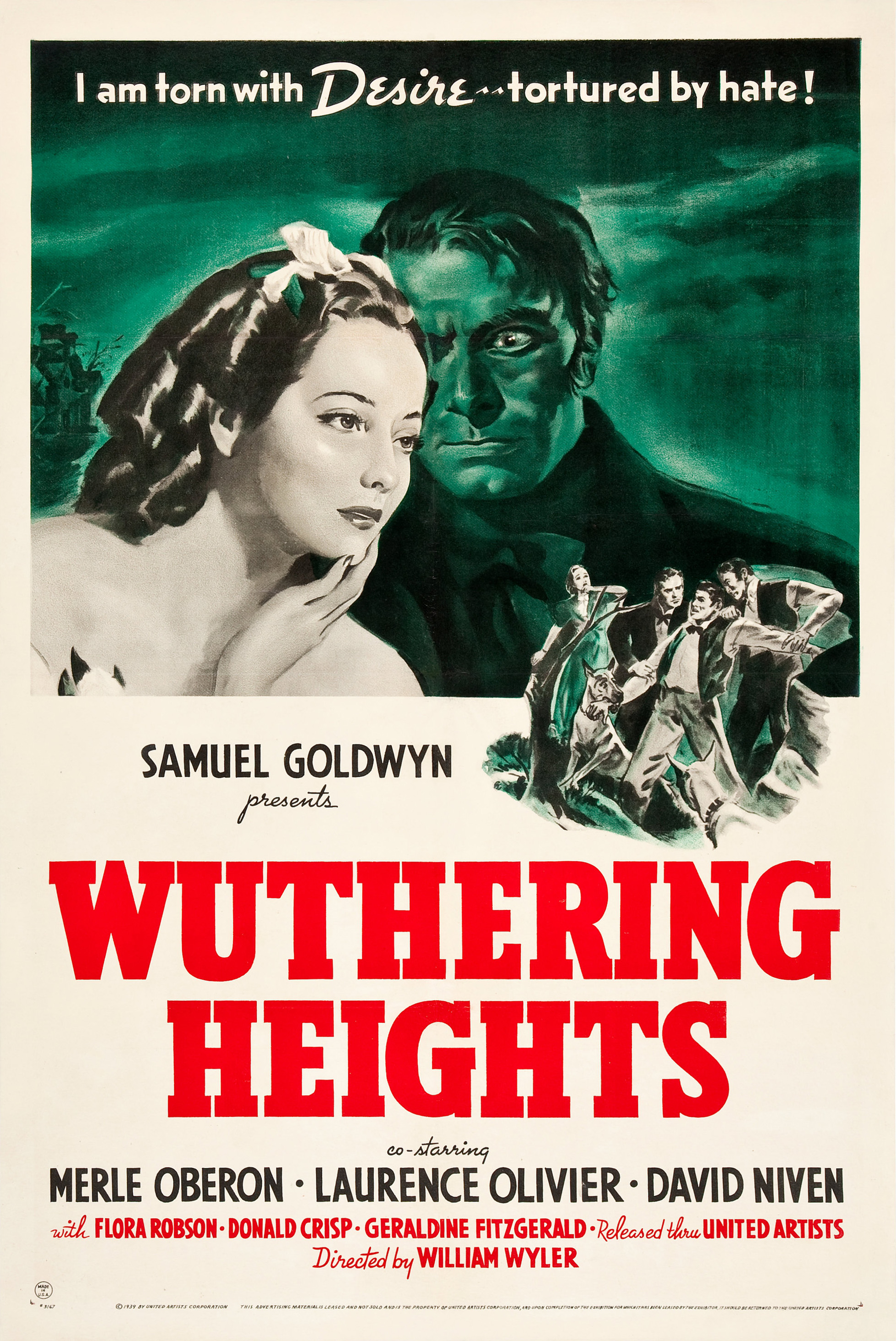
- Theatrical release poster
- Directed by: William Wyler
- Screenplay by: Charles MacArthur; Ben Hecht; John Huston (uncredited)
- Based on: Wuthering Heights; 1847 novel by Emily Brontë (credited as Emily Bronté)
- Produced by: Samuel Goldwyn
- Starring: Merle Oberon; Laurence Olivier; David Niven; Flora Robson; Donald Crisp; Geraldine Fitzgerald; Hugh Williams
- Cinematography: Gregg Toland
- Edited by: Daniel Mandell
- Music by: Alfred Newman
- Production company: Samuel Goldwyn Productions
- Distributed by: United Artists
- Release dates: March 24, 1939 (Hollywood); April 13, 1939 (US)
- Running time: 103 minutes
- Country: United States
- Language: English
- Box office: $624,643 (1989 re-issue)

Wuthering Heights is a 1939 American romantic period drama film directed by William Wyler, produced by Samuel Goldwyn, starring Merle Oberon, Laurence Olivier, and David Niven, and based on the 1847 novel Wuthering Heights by Emily Brontë. The film depicts only 16 of the novel's 34 chapters, eliminating the second generation of characters. The novel was adapted for the screen by Charles MacArthur, Ben Hecht and John Huston (uncredited). The supporting cast features Flora Robson and Geraldine Fitzgerald.

The outdoor scenes were filmed in Thousand Oaks, California, with scenes shot in Wildwood Regional Park and at the current site of California Lutheran University.

The film won the 1939 New York Film Critics Award for Best Film. It earned eight nominations at the 12th Academy Awards, including for Best Picture, Best Director and Best Actor. The 1940 Academy Award for Best Cinematography, black-and-white category, was awarded to Gregg Toland for his work. Alfred Newman's score, including the track "Cathy's Theme" was nominated for original score but lost to The Wizard of Oz.

In 2007, Wuthering Heights was selected for preservation in the United States National Film Registry by the Library of Congress as being "culturally, historically, or aesthetically significant".

== Plot ==
A traveler named Lockwood is caught in the snow and stays at the estate of Wuthering Heights, despite the cold behavior of his host Heathcliff. Late that night, after being shown into an upstairs room that was once a bridal chamber, Lockwood is awakened by a cold draft and finds the window shutter flapping back and forth. Just as he is about to close it, he feels an icy hand clutching his and hears a woman outside calling, "Heathcliff, let me in! I'm lost in the moors. It's Cathy!" Lockwood calls Heathcliff and tells him what he saw, whereupon the enraged Heathcliff throws him out of the room. Once Lockwood is gone, Heathcliff frantically calls out to Cathy and runs down the stairs and into the snowstorm. Ellen, the housekeeper, tells the amazed Lockwood that he has seen the ghost of Cathy Earnshaw, Heathcliff's only great love, who died years ago. When Lockwood says that he doesn't believe in ghosts, Ellen tells him that he might if she told him the story of Cathy, and he asks her to do so, intrigued. The story is then shown as a flashback.

As a boy, Heathcliff is found on the streets of Liverpool by Mr. Earnshaw, who brings him home to live with his two children, Cathy and Hindley. At first reluctant, Cathy eventually welcomes Heathcliff, and they become very close, but Hindley treats him as an outcast, especially after Mr. Earnshaw dies. About ten years later, the now-grown Heathcliff and Cathy have fallen in love and are meeting secretly at Penistone Crags on the moors. Hindley has become dissolute and tyrannical towards Cathy and the servants and forces Heathcliff to be a stable boy out of hatred for him.

One night as Cathy and Heathcliff are out together, they hear music and realize that their neighbors, the Linton family, are having a party. The pair sneak inside the Lintons' estate by climbing over their garden wall, but the dogs are alerted and attack them. One of the dogs bites Cathy, and she suffers a severe leg injury. Heathcliff is forced to leave Cathy in their care. Enraged that the Lintons' glamor and wealth would so entrance Cathy, he blames the family for her injury and curses them all.

Cathy fully recuperates while staying for months with the Lintons, then returns home. Edgar Linton has fallen in love with Cathy and soon proposes; after Edgar takes her back to Wuthering Heights, she tells Ellen what has happened. Ellen reminds her about Heathcliff, but Cathy flippantly remarks that it would degrade her to marry him. Heathcliff overhears and leaves before he can hear Cathy realize aloud that she belongs with him, not Edgar, despite their class difference. When she discovers Heathcliff has overheard, she runs after him into the moors during a raging storm. Edgar finds her cold and ill. He summons the local doctor, Kenneth, who nurses her back to health. Soon after her recovery, Cathy and Edgar marry.

Heathcliff then disappears but returns years later, now wealthy and elegant. He has refined his appearance and manners to impress Cathy, and secretly buys Wuthering Heights from Hindley, whose gambling and heavy drinking have brought him to financial ruin. Cathy remains with Edgar despite Heathcliff's return and denies her love for him; to spite Cathy, Heathcliff begins courting Edgar's naïve sister, Isabella. Despite Cathy's objecting strongly to both Isabella and Heathcliff, the two eventually marry. A brokenhearted Cathy soon falls gravely ill. Heathcliff rushes to her side against the wishes of a now disillusioned and bitter Isabella. Cathy finally tells Heathcliff that she loves only him, and they reconcile, forgiving each other. At her request, Heathcliff carries Cathy to the window, so she can see the moors for the last time before dying in Heathcliff's arms. Heathcliff asks Cathy to haunt him until the day he dies.

As Ellen finishes her story, Dr. Kenneth arrives and tells Ellen and Lockwood that he saw Heathcliff on the moors with a woman, only to find Heathcliff's corpse alone in the snow. Ellen realizes that he saw the ghosts of Heathcliff and Cathy, who now haunt Penistone Crags together.

== Cast ==
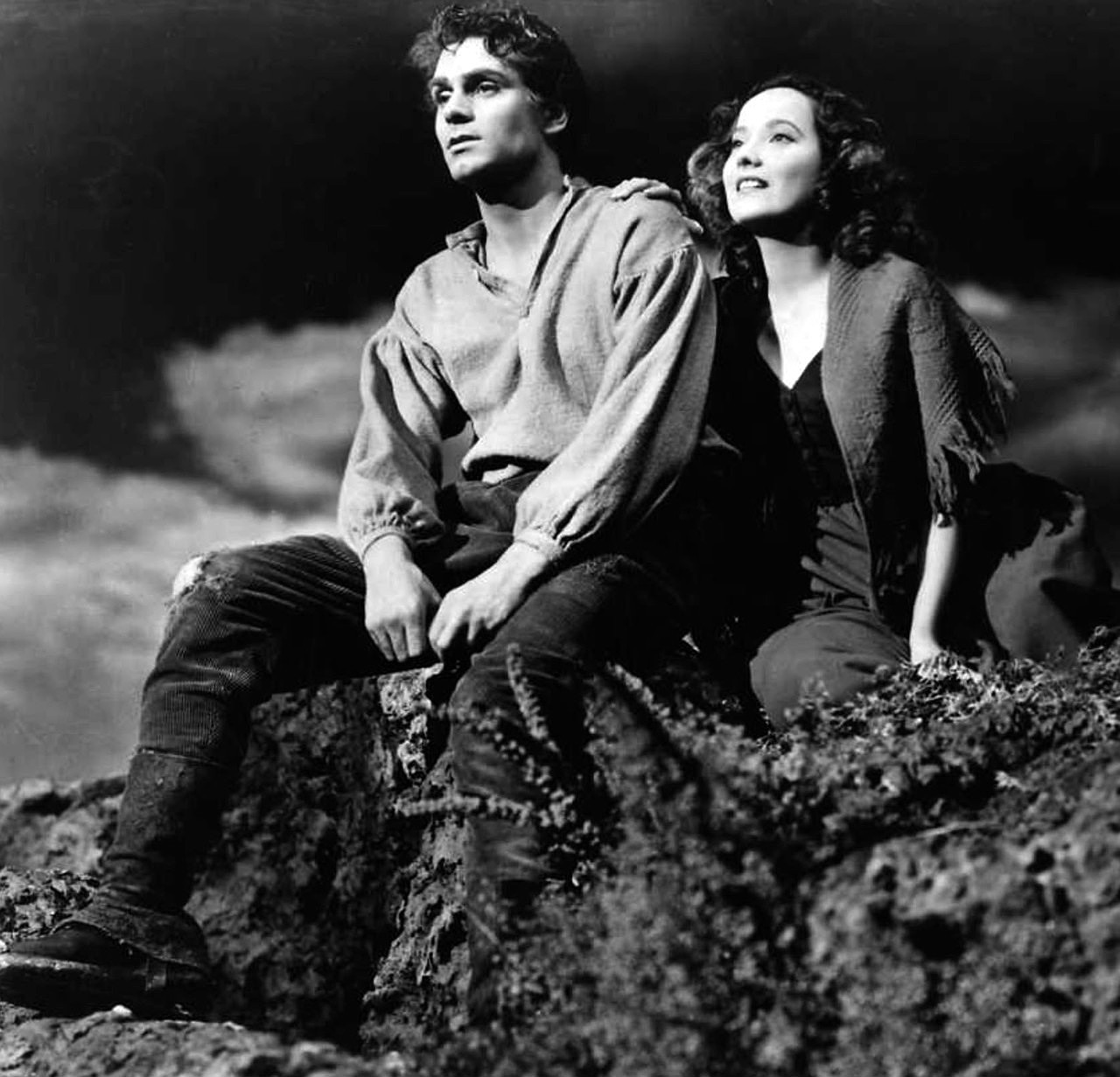
Laurence Olivier and Merle Oberon

- Merle Oberon as Catherine Earnshaw Linton
- Laurence Olivier as Heathcliff
- David Niven as Edgar Linton
- Flora Robson as Ellen Dean
- Geraldine Fitzgerald as Isabella Linton
- Hugh Williams as Hindley Earnshaw
- Donald Crisp as Dr. Kenneth
- Leo G. Carroll as Joseph
- Miles Mander as Mr. Lockwood - the stranger
- Cecil Kellaway as Earnshaw, Cathy's father
- Cecil Humphreys as Judge Linton
- Sarita Wooton as Cathy – as a child (as Sarita Wooten)
- Rex Downing as Heathcliff – as a child
- Douglas Scott as Hindley – as a child
- Vernon Downing as Giles
- Alice Ehlers – "Miss Erliss", harpsichordist

== Novel sections omitted in film ==
The film significantly shortened the plot of the novel. Originally, the book was divided into two volumes, the first involving Cathy and Heathcliff, and the second later in time involving Heathcliff's interactions with Cathy's daughter, also called Catherine, Heathcliff's son by Isabella, Linton, and Hindley's son Hareton. In the film the second volume, and thus the children and their stories, is omitted.

Because the film cuts that large amount, some of the characters are shifted or omitted. For example, the present-time beginning and ending of the film provide a frame for the flashback in both the film and book; but in the film, Isabella is still the supposed mistress of the household, whereas in the novel time has proceeded to the point where the younger Catherine is the primary female resident. In general, Heathcliff's apparent contact with Cathy's spirit and his subsequent death is preserved as the ending of the film, although it takes place sooner in time, and in a somewhat different way.

== Production ==
=== Casting ===
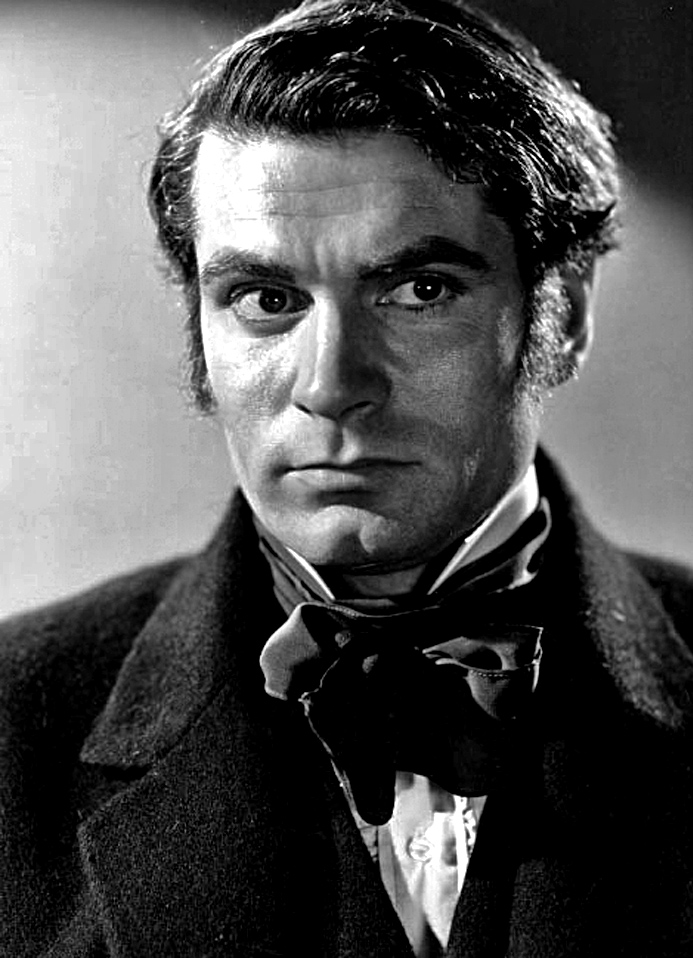
Laurence Olivier as Heathcliff, 1939

The project was initially intended as a vehicle for Merle Oberon, who was under contract with Goldwyn at the time. However, when Laurence Olivier was cast as Heathcliff, Vivien Leigh wanted to play the lead role with her then-lover and future husband. Studio executives felt the role could not go to an actress who was largely unknown in America, but they did offer Leigh the part of Isabella Linton. She declined, and Geraldine Fitzgerald was cast. Leigh was cast in Gone with the Wind the same year, for which she won an Academy Award for Best Actress; Merle Oberon did not receive a nomination for her performance.

Ronald Colman, Douglas Fairbanks Jr. and Robert Newton were considered for the role of Heathcliff.

=== Filming ===
The Mitchell Camera Corporation selected cinematographer Gregg Toland and Wuthering Heights to be the first to use their new Mitchell BNC camera. This camera model would become a studio standard for the next half century, and the prototype of Panavision studio cameras of the following decades.

The novel takes place in the late 18th and early 19th centuries. However, the film places the action in the mid-19th century, around the time of the novel's publication. Sarah Berry writes that Samuel Goldwyn deliberately chose to do this because he thought "Civil War" fashions were more attractive than Regency fashions. Other writers have claimed that Goldwyn was short on funds and had to recycle costumes from a Civil War drama.

There were clashes on the set between the actors and the director. Both of the leading players began work on the film miserable at having to leave their loved ones back in the United Kingdom; Olivier missed his fiancée Vivien Leigh, and Oberon had recently fallen in love with film producer Alexander Korda. Merle Oberon and Laurence Olivier also apparently detested each other, even though both had performed together the year before in The Divorce of Lady X. Witnesses recall Oberon's scolding Olivier for accidentally spitting on her during a particularly romantic balcony scene. Oberon shouted to Wyler, "Tell him to stop spitting at me!" Olivier retorted by shouting, "What's a little spit for Chrissake, between actors? You bloody little idiot, how dare you speak to me?" Oberon ran crying from the set after the outburst, and Wyler insisted Olivier apologize to her, which upset Olivier greatly.

Olivier also found himself becoming increasingly annoyed with William Wyler's exhausting and often uncommunicative style of filmmaking. One scene with Olivier was shot 72 times—with each new take called for by Wyler without any actual direction for his actor; just "again!" Finally, an exasperated Olivier is said to have exclaimed "For God's sake, I did it sitting down. I did it with a smile. I did it with a smirk. I did it scratching my ear. I did it with my back to the camera. How do you want me to do it?" Wyler's retort was "I want it better." However, in both his autobiography and his book On Acting, Olivier credits William Wyler with teaching him how to act in films, as opposed to on the stage, and for giving him a new respect for films. Olivier had tended to "ham it up" as if he were playing to the second balcony, but Wyler showed him how to act more subtly - in part by simply wearing him down.

In the final sequence of Wuthering Heights, the spirits of Heathcliff and Cathy are seen walking together hand-in-hand, obviously in love. This scene is not found in the book, and according to literary critic John Sutherland, was likely the stark opposite of what Brontë intended the reader to understand. He contends that a contemporary reader would not have seen Cathy's ghost's actions as a gesture of undying love for Heathcliff but one of towering, protective rage; Cathy haunted Heathcliff to death only to prevent him from cheating her daughter out of her inheritance. Director Wyler hated the idea of the after-life scene and didn't want to do it, but producer Samuel Goldwyn vetoed him, and the scene was added after primary filming was complete. As Laurence Olivier and Merle Oberon had moved to other projects, doubles had to be used. Goldwyn subsequently claimed, "I made Wuthering Heights, Wyler only directed it." In fact, Goldwyn's name and producer credit appears last in the opening credits, going against the convention of the director's name appearing last. Goldwyn claimed that Wuthering Heights was his favorite of all his productions. Sutherland writes that this change to the ending has influenced how students view the novel and especially Cathy, who comes across as more passive and accepting of abuse than Brontë may have envisioned.

David Niven remembers the filming of Merle Oberon's deathbed scenes (recorded in his bestselling book The Moon's a Balloon) as less than romantic. After telling Wyler he did not know how to 'sob', he had been given a menthol mist substance to help it appear as if he were crying, which instead made "green goo" come out of his nose. Oberon immediately exited the bed after witnessing it.

== Reception ==
=== Critical reception ===
Frank S. Nugent of The New York Times called it "a strong and somber film, poetically written as the novel not always was, sinister and wild as it was meant to be, far more compact dramatically than Miss Brontë had made it ... It is, unquestionably, one of the most distinguished pictures of the year, one of the finest ever produced by Mr. Goldwyn, and one you should decide to see." Variety wrote that the film "retains all of the grim drama of the book," but believed that its "slow pace" would make for "rather dull material for general audiences." Film Daily reported "Brilliant screen version of Bronte novel ... William Wyler has given the love story warm, sympathetic direction, gaining fine performances from his cast." Harrison's Reports noted "The acting, direction, and production are all excellent; but the story is so sombre and cheerless, that most persons will leave the theatre depressed." John Mosher of The New Yorker wrote: "No screen version of 'Wuthering Heights' could ever touch the heart so closely, I am sure, as does a reading of the printed page; yet the Goldwyn production approximates the quality of the fierce, tempestuous story with a force one might never have expected ... Seldom has the tone of a great novel been so faithfully reproduced by the movie people." According to Tony Thomas, the film's score does so much "to maintain its life as a masterpiece of romantic filmmaking."

Although Wuthering Heights was awarded Best Film by the New York Film Critics Circle, it only won after 14 ballots, possibly winning as a compromise after a long stalemate between supporters of Gone with the Wind and Mr. Smith Goes to Washington.

The film was placed fourth in Film Daily's year-end nationwide poll of 542 critics naming the best films of the year.

American Film Institute included the film as #73 in its AFI's 100 Years... 100 Movies and #15 in AFI's 100 Years... 100 Passions. On Rotten Tomatoes, the film holds a rating of 92% from 25 reviews with the following consensus: "Sumptuous design and perfect casting makes Wuthering Heights an exemplar of old Hollywood studio filmmaking, even if to a fault."

=== Accolades ===
Award	Category	Recipients	Result
Academy Awards	Outstanding Production	Samuel Goldwyn	Nominated
Academy Awards	Best Director	William Wyler	Nominated
Academy Awards	Best Actor	Laurence Olivier	Nominated
Academy Awards	Best Supporting Actress	Geraldine Fitzgerald	Nominated
Academy Awards	Best Screenplay	Ben Hecht and Charles MacArthur	Nominated
Academy Awards	Best Art Direction	James Basevi	Nominated
Academy Awards	Best Cinematography – Black-and-White	Gregg Toland	Won
Academy Awards	Best Original Score	Alfred Newman	Nominated
National Board of Review Awards	Top Ten Films	Wuthering Heights	2nd Place
National Board of Review Awards	Best Acting	Geraldine Fitzgerald	Won
National Board of Review Awards	Best Acting	Laurence Olivier	Won
National Film Preservation Board	National Film Registry	Wuthering Heights	Inducted
New York Film Critics Circle Awards	Best Film	Wuthering Heights	Won
