= Carmelo Larrea =

Spanish composer and pianist

- Birth name: Carmelo Larrea Carricarte
- Born: 16 July 1907 Deusto, Spain
- Died: 2 February 1980 (aged 72) Madrid, Spain
- Genres: Copla, bolero, pasodoble, jazz, circus music
- Occupation(s): Songwriter, musician
- Instrument(s): Piano, organ, saxophone
- Formerly of: Jesús Guridi

Carmelo Larrea Carricarte (16 July 1907 – 2 February 1980) was a Spanish songwriter and musician. During the 1940s and '50s he composed famous songs such as "Noche triste", "No te puedo querer", "Dos cruces" and "Camino verde".

== Life and career ==
=== Early years ===
Carmelo Larrea Carricarte was born at 1 AM on 16 July 1907 in the neighbourhood of Elorrieta in Deusto, Spain (nowadays a district of Bilbao), to Mariano Larrea and Nemesia Carricarte. He studied commerce at the Escolapios and music at the Philharmonic Society's Music Academy, soon deciding to pursue a career in the latter. He studied organ and choir singing under Jesús Guridi. At the same time he worked as a bicycle shop assistant. He worked for five years at the circus as part of a piano/violin/concertina trio, making his debut with the Carrey brothers circus in San Sebastián. After playing in Barcelona and Madrid, the trio joined the Corzana and Feijoo circuses. After a member of the trio left for the military service, Larrea joined the Bilbao-based dance orchestra La Terraza. An avid pianist, Larrea became interested in jazz. On 31 January 1931 Larrea married Victoria García y Encinas.

=== Songwriting success ===
Larrea and his partners reformed the trio before finally disbanding in 1936 due to the start of the Spanish Civil War while they were playing in Jerez de la Frontera. He then joined a band in Sevilla and played the saxophone in the Santa Cruz neighbourhood. Encourage by a fellow musician, Larrea began to write his own songs. His first hit was "¡Qué buena soy!", bulerías sung by Gracia de Triana in the film Escuadrilla. Even more successful was his song "Noche triste", premiered by Antonio Machín in 1941 in Seville. Many other popular compositions followed, including "Las doce en punto", "Un año más" and "No te puedo querer". The latter, sung by Jorge Sepúlveda, earned him a golden record in Mexico in 1952.

Larrea then moved to Madrid, where he played in the Alazán orchestra. Motivated by his friend Mariano Méndez Vigo, Larrea wrote a song for the radio programme El Tribunal de la Canción. This composition –originally known as "Soledad" (Solitude)– was "Dos cruces" (Two Crosses), his most famous song and one of Spain's most popular boleros. Originally sung by Jorge Gallarzo, a version that earned him his second golden record in 1954, it has been covered over 80 times. He then penned "Camino verde", a song performed by Angelillo in the 1955 film Suspiros de Triana, directed by Ramón Torrado. Many of his compositions ended up as leitmotivs in films such as Manuel Summers' The Girl in Mourning.

=== Later years and death ===
In January 1955 Larrea moved to Latin America, where he spent nine years before returning to Spain. He lived primarily in Caracas, Venezuela, where he married Josefina Reguilón Rosón (his previous wife had died years before). He then went to London to join the orchestra at the Nili, an Israeli cruise ship that toured Nordic countries. He came back to Spain definitively in 1965, living in Madrid with his wife until his death on 2 February 1980.

== Legacy and influence ==
Larrea is considered one of Spain's most prolific songwriters of the 20th century, particularly in genres such as the bolero and the pasodoble. During his time he was compared to songwriters such as Agustín Lara, Charles Trenet, Osvaldo Farrés and Bobby Capó due to the fact that he wrote both the music and the lyrics of his songs. Spain's most famous singers, including María Dolores Pradera and Jorge Sepúlveda immortalized many of his works. In 2011, a garden in Bilbao was named after him, concerts took place in his honour and his biography –Carmelo Larrea (1907-1980) Compositor de boleros universales– was published.
