= Stagecoach (1939 film) =

American film by John Ford

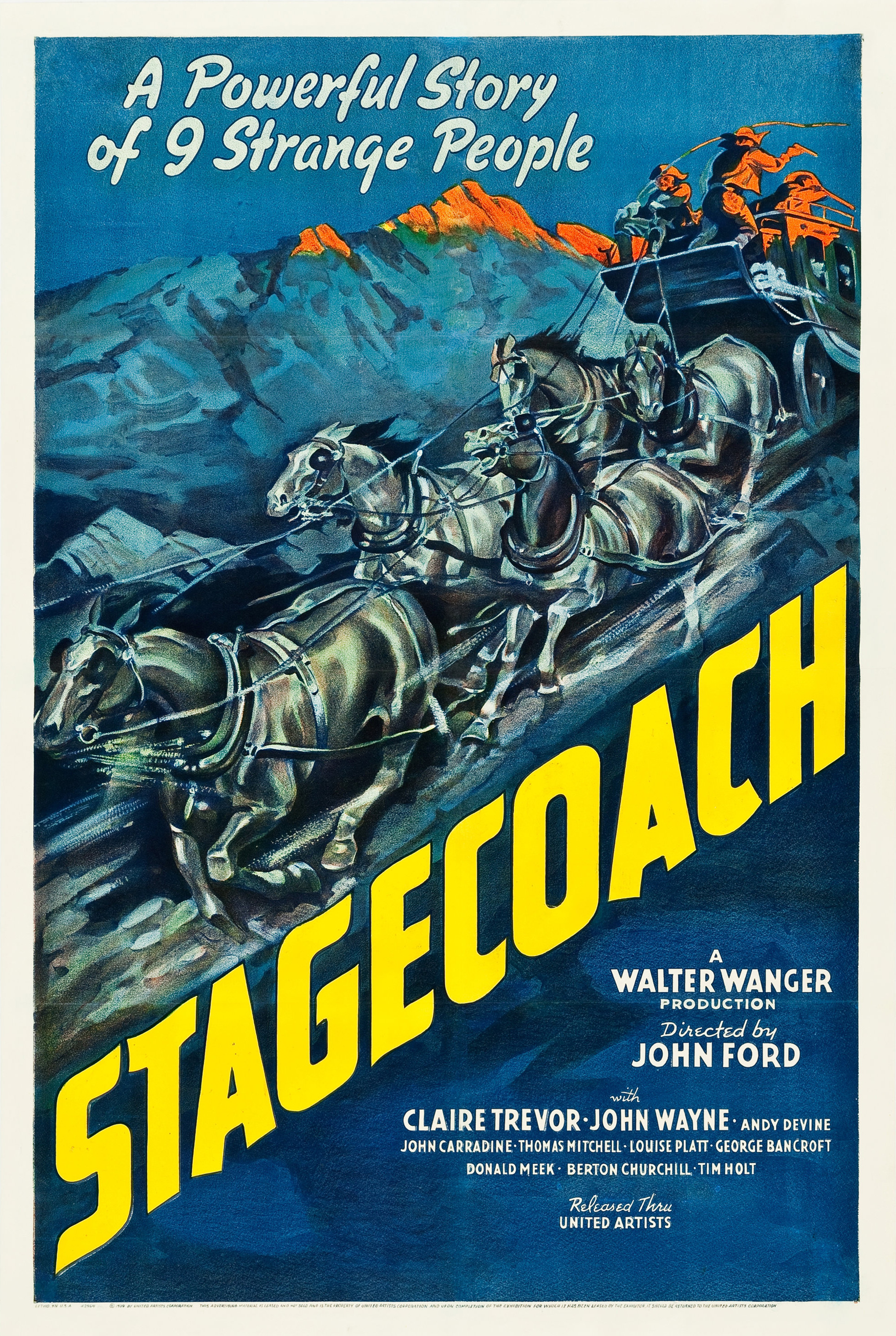
- Theatrical release poster
- Directed by: John Ford
- Screenplay by: Dudley Nichols; Uncredited: Ben Hecht
- Based on: "The Stage to Lordsburg"; 1937 story in Collier's by Ernest Haycox
- Produced by: Walter Wanger
- Starring: Claire Trevor; John Wayne; Andy Devine; John Carradine; Thomas Mitchell; Louise Platt; George Bancroft; Donald Meek; Berton Churchill; Tim Holt
- Cinematography: Bert Glennon
- Edited by: Otho Lovering; Dorothy Spencer
- Music by: Richard Hageman; Franke Harling; Louis Gruenberg; John Leipold; Leo Shuken; Gerard Carbonara (uncredited); Stephen Pasternacki (uncredited)
- Production company: Walter Wanger Productions
- Distributed by: United Artists
- Release dates: February 2, 1939 (Los Angeles); March 3, 1939 (U.S.)
- Running time: 96 minutes
- Country: United States
- Language: English
- Budget: $531,374
- Box office: $1,103,757

Stagecoach is a 1939 American Western film directed by John Ford and starring Claire Trevor and John Wayne. The screenplay by Dudley Nichols is an adaptation of "The Stage to Lordsburg", a 1937 short story by Ernest Haycox. The film follows an eclectic group of travelers riding on a stagecoach through dangerous Apache territory.

The film has long been recognized as an important work transcending the Western genre, and is widely considered one of the greatest and most influential films ever made. In 1995, the film was deemed "culturally, historically, or aesthetically significant" by the United States Library of Congress and selected for preservation in their National Film Registry. Still, Stagecoach has not avoided controversy. Like most Westerns of the era, its depiction of Native Americans as mere savages has been criticized.

Stagecoach was the first of many Westerns that Ford shot in Monument Valley, on the Arizona–Utah border in the American Southwest. Some scenes blended shots of Monument Valley with those filmed on the Iverson Movie Ranch in Chatsworth, California, RKO Encino Ranch, and elsewhere, and as a result geographic incongruities appear.

== Plot ==
In June 1880, stage driver Buck prepares a stagecoach to run from Tonto, Arizona Territory, to Lordsburg, New Mexico. Among the passengers are Dallas, a prostitute driven out of town by the "Law and Order League"; the alcoholic doctor Josiah Boone; snobbish belle Lucy Mallory from Virginia, who is travelling to join her cavalry officer husband; and diminutive whiskey salesman Samuel Peacock from Kansas.

Meanwhile, Henry the "Ringo Kid" has broken out of prison to avenge the murder of his father and brother by Luke Plummer, a dangerous gunslinger who is in Lordsburg with his two brothers. The Plummers also accused Ringo of killing their foreman, which led to Ringo's conviction. Marshal Curley Wilcox decides to ride shotgun on the stage and find Ringo. U.S. Cavalry Lieutenant Blanchard reports that Geronimo and his Apache warriors are on the warpath, and so his troop will provide a temporary escort to Dry Fork station. Hatfield, a former Confederate Army officer but now a disreputable gambler with an assumed name, recognizes Lucy from his past and climbs aboard to offer his protection out of chivalry. Ellsworth H. Gatewood, an arrogant banker, also boards.

En route, the stage encounters Ringo, stranded after his horse went lame. Though Curley and Ringo are friends, Curley takes Ringo into custody. When they reach Dry Fork, they learn the expected cavalry detachment has gone on to Apache Wells station. Most of the party votes to proceed. The group is taken aback when Ringo, unaware of her profession, bonds with Dallas as the journey progresses.

At Apache Wells, Lucy learns that her husband was wounded in battle with the Apaches and rushed to Lordsburg. She faints, and stunning the group, goes into labor. Doc Boone sobers up, and delivers the baby with Dallas assisting. Later that night, Ringo asks Dallas to marry him, and live on a ranch he owns across the border in Mexico. Afraid to reveal her past, she is evasive. The next morning, she accepts with Boone's encouragement, but is unwilling to leave Lucy and the newborn; instead, she encourages Ringo to escape, promising to meet him in Mexico later. Before Ringo can leave, he sees smoke signals heralding nearby Apaches, and decides to stay.

The stage reaches a ferry crossing, which the Apaches have sacked. Curley uncuffs Ringo to help lash logs to the stagecoach, and float it across the river. As the group anticipates safely reaching Lordsburg, Apaches suddenly attack on horseback with bows and arrows and rifles, and a long chase across a dry lake bed ensues, during which Buck and Peacock are wounded. Curley, Ringo, Boone, and Hatfield fight off the attackers with rifles and pistols until their ammunition is exhausted. Down to his last bullet, Hatfield is about to humanely dispatch Lucy when he is mortally wounded. The stage is rescued in time by the 6th Cavalry. Dying, Hatfield reveals that he is the son of a respected judge in Virginia, a family known to Lucy.

At Lordsburg, Gatewood is arrested for attempting to abscond with his bank's funds. Lucy learns that her wounded husband will fully recover; she thanks Dallas, who gives Lucy her shawl. Peacock invites Dallas to visit his home in Kansas City, Kansas. Ringo escorts Dallas to her destination in a seedy part of town, and finally learns who she is, but he reaffirms his desire to marry her.

Luke Plummer, who is playing poker in one of the saloons, hears of Ringo's arrival and summons his brothers to join him in the showdown. Ringo guns down the Plummers in a shootout, then surrenders to Curley, expecting to be taken back to prison. As Ringo climbs onto a buckboard, Curley invites Dallas to ride with them to the edge of town. But, when she gets aboard, Curley and Boone stampede the horses, happily letting the couple speed off together towards Ringo's ranch.

== Cast ==
- Claire Trevor as Dallas
- John Wayne as Henry, the Ringo Kid
- Andy Devine as Buck
- John Carradine as Hatfield
- Thomas Mitchell as Doc Boone
- Louise Platt as Lucy Mallory
- George Bancroft as Curley
- Donald Meek as Peacock
- Berton Churchill as Gatewood
- Tim Holt as the Lieutenant
- Tom Tyler as Luke Plummer

In addition, several cast members were uncredited:

- Chief John Big Tree as Indian scout (identified as Cheyenne)
- Yakima Canutt as Cavalry scout and stunt performer
- Nora Cecil as Boone's landlady
- Steve Clemente as Spanish-speaker who alerts Plummers
- Francis Ford as Sergeant Billy Pickett
- Brenda Fowler as Mrs Gatewood
- William Hopper as Sergeant
- Duke R. Lee as Lordsburg sheriff
- Chris-Pin Martin as Chris, innkeeper
- Vester Pegg as Hank Plummer
- Jack Pennick as Jerry, barkeeper in Tonto
- Joe Rickson as Ike Plummer
- Elvira Ríos as Yakima, Chris's Apache wife
- White Horse as Apache chief

=== Gallery ===
Stagecoach stills
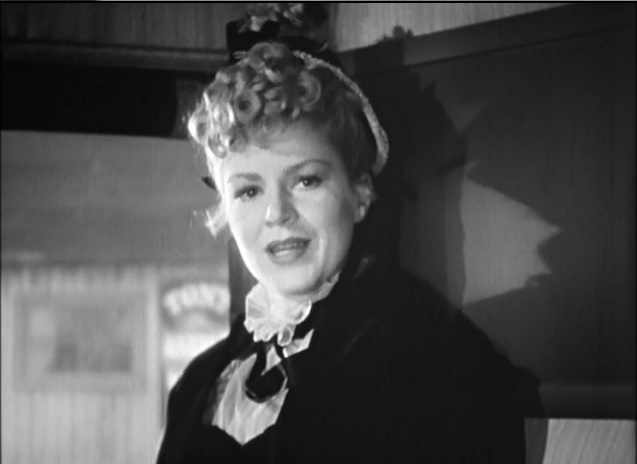
Claire Trevor

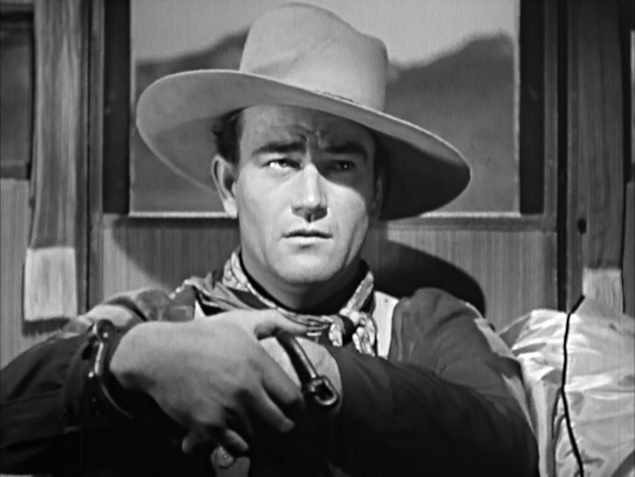
John Wayne

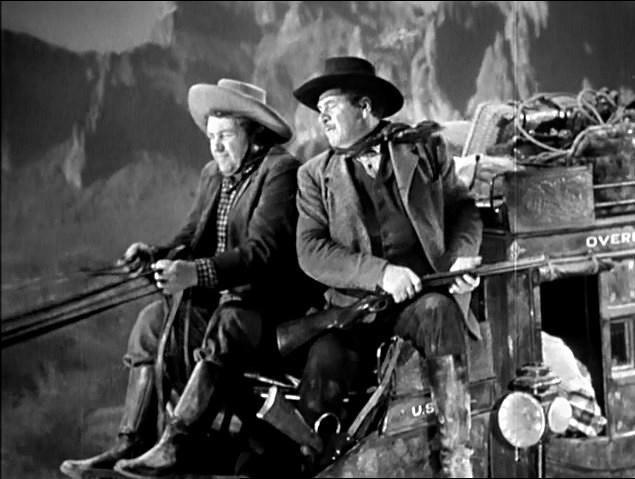
Devine & Bancroft

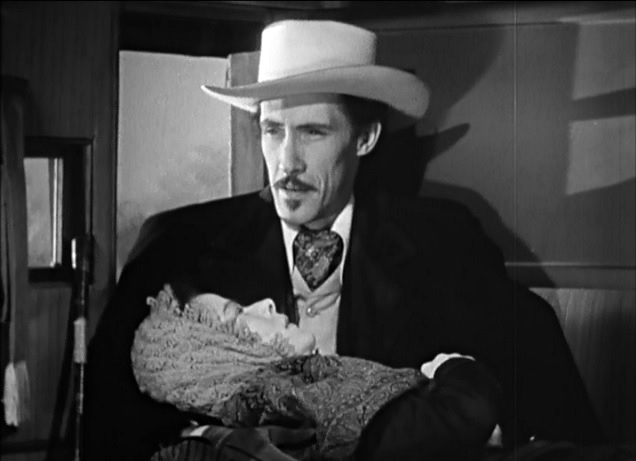
Carradine & Platt

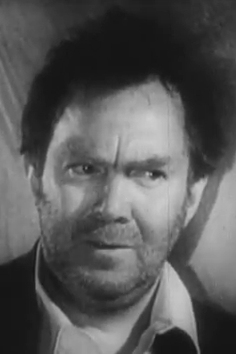
Thomas Mitchell

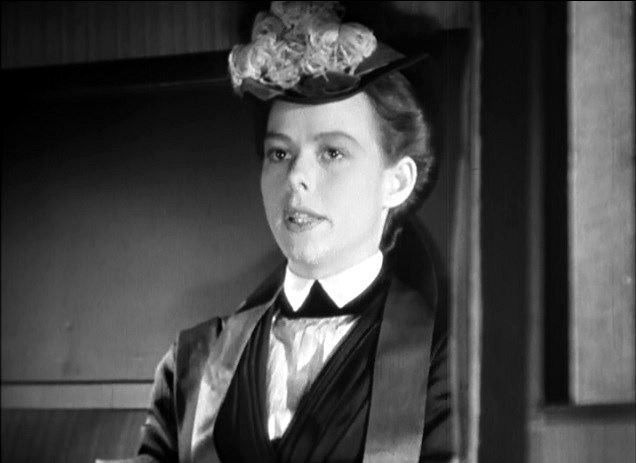
Louise Platt

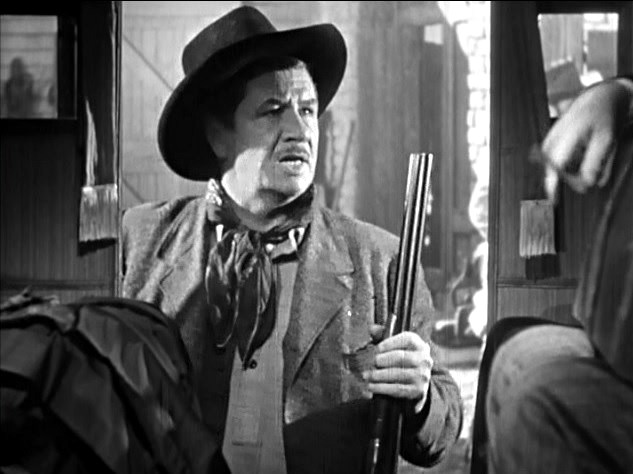
George Bancroft

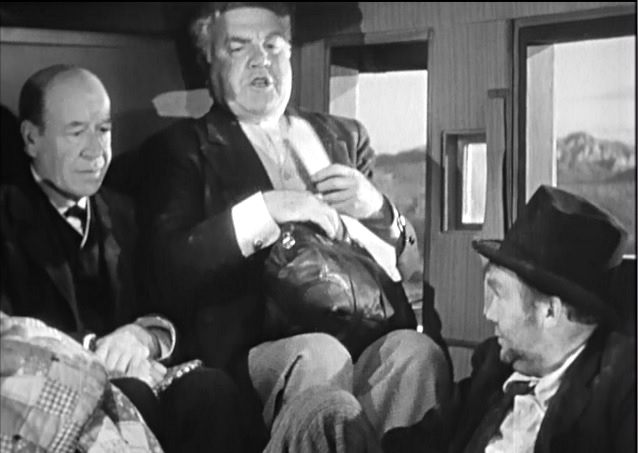
Meek, Churchill & Mitchell

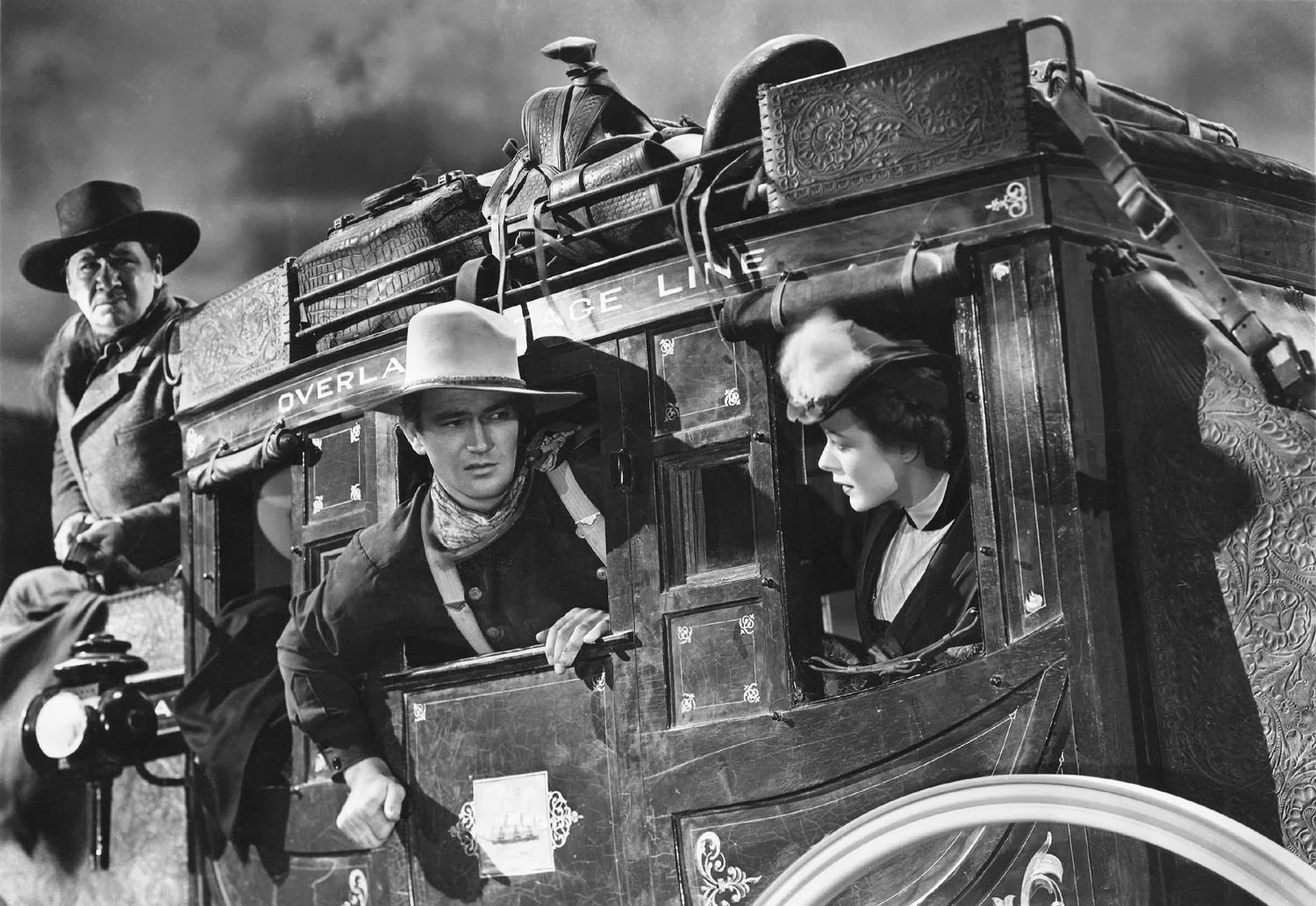
Bancroft, Wayne & Platt

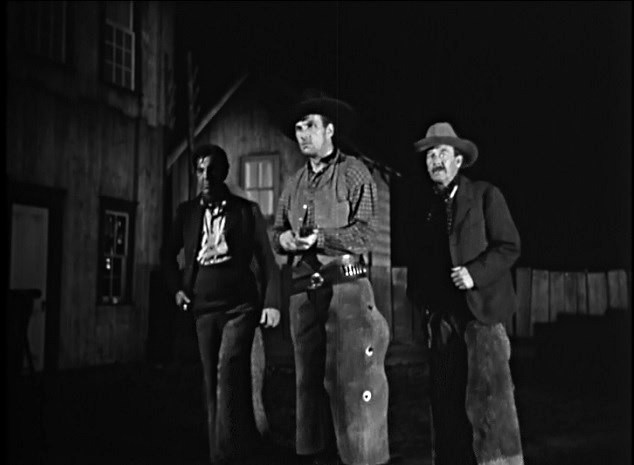
Rickson, Tyler & Pegg

== Production ==
=== Development ===
The screenplay is an adaptation by Dudley Nichols of "The Stage to Lordsburg," a short story by Ernest Haycox. The film rights to the work were bought by John Ford soon after it was published in Collier's magazine on April 10, 1937. According to Thomas Schatz, Ford claimed that his inspiration in expanding Stagecoach beyond the bare-bones plot created by Haycox was his familiarity with another short story, "Boule de Suif" by Guy de Maupassant, although Schatz believes "this scarcely holds up to scrutiny". Ford's statement also seems to be the basis for the claim that Haycox himself relied upon Guy de Maupassant's story. However, according to a Haycox biographer, there is no direct evidence of Haycox being familiar with Maupassant's tale, especially as he was documented as going out of his way to avoid reading the work of others that might unconsciously influence his writing, and he focused his personal reading in the area of history. Screenwriter Ben Hecht also contributed to the Stagecoach screenplay (in particular, Dallas's dialogue) but went uncredited. In addition, Hecht worked with Ford on ideas for the outdoor action sequences based on his experience with the film Viva Villa! in 1934.

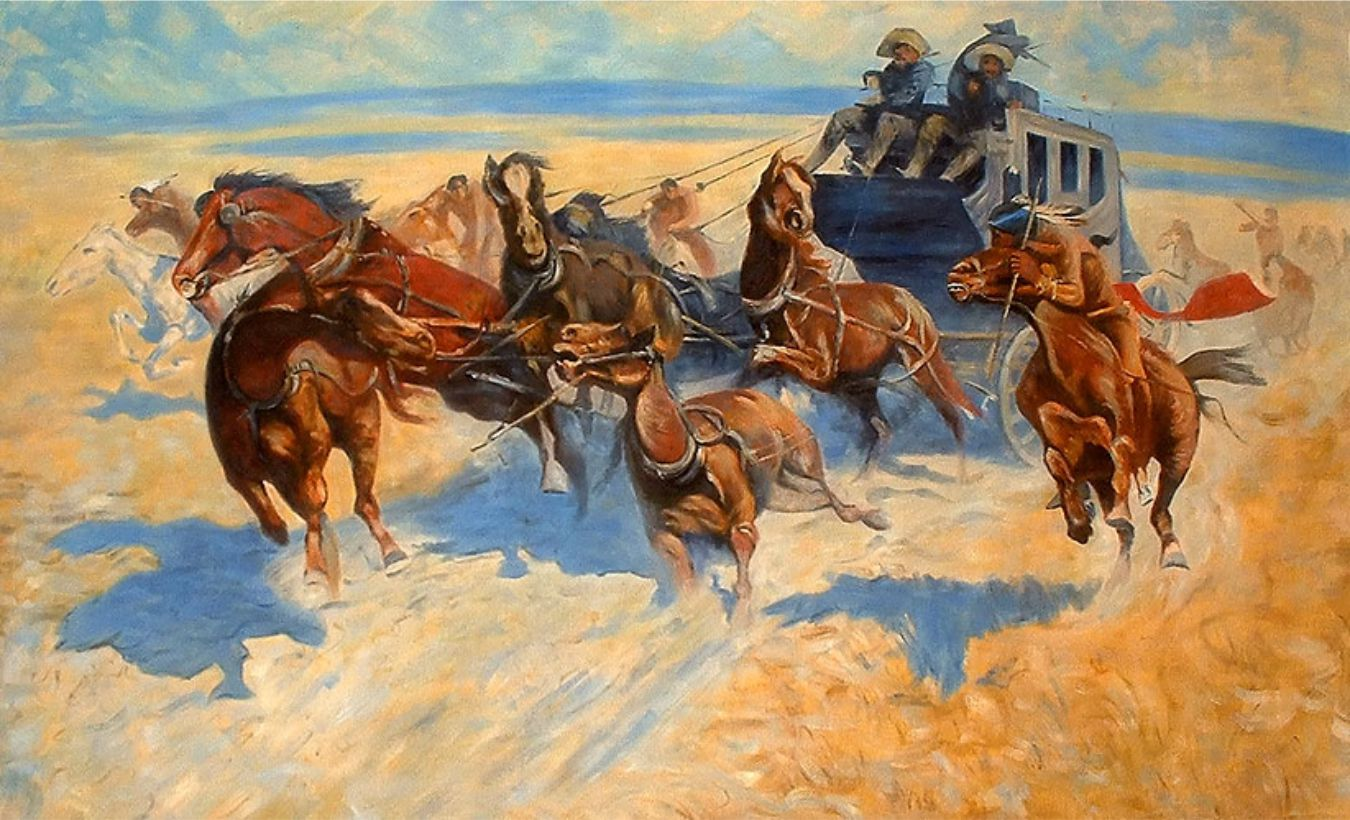
Downing the Nigh Leader

John Ford admitted that he took inspiration from a 1907 painting by Frederic Remington named Downing the Nigh Leader for the chase scene.

Before production, Ford shopped the project around to several Hollywood studios, all of which turned him down because big budget Westerns had been out of vogue since the silents, and because Ford insisted on using then-B-movie actor John Wayne in the key role in the film. Independent producer David O. Selznick finally agreed to produce it, but was frustrated by Ford's indecision about when shooting would begin, and had his own doubts over the casting. Ford withdrew the film from Selznick's company and approached independent producer Walter Wanger about the project. Wanger had the same reservations about producing an "A" Western and even more about one starring John Wayne. Ford had not directed a Western since the silent days. Wanger said he would not risk his money unless Ford replaced John Wayne with Gary Cooper and brought in Marlene Dietrich to play Dallas.

Ford refused to budge; it would be Wayne or no one. Eventually the pair compromised, with Wanger putting up $250,000, a little more than half of what Ford had been seeking, and Ford would give top billing to Claire Trevor, better known than John Wayne at the time.

=== Filming ===
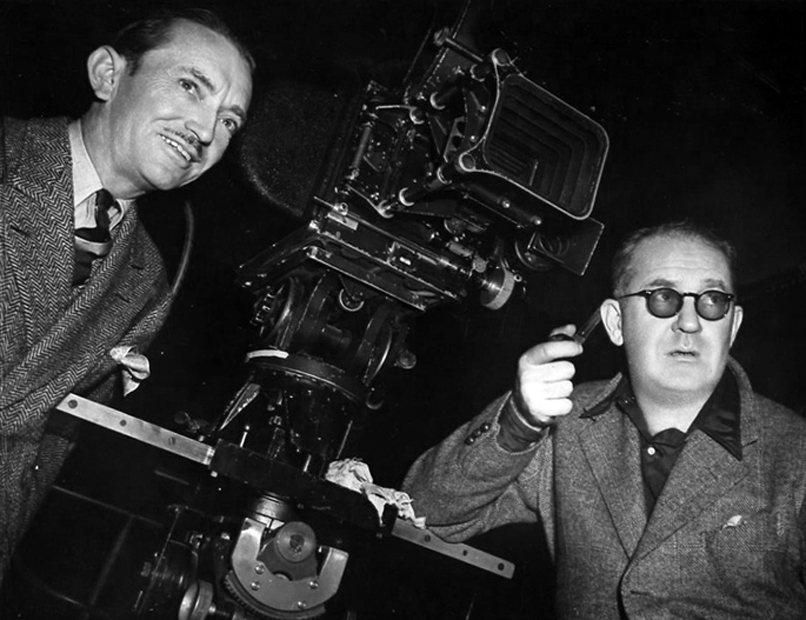
Cinematographer Bert Glennon and director John Ford

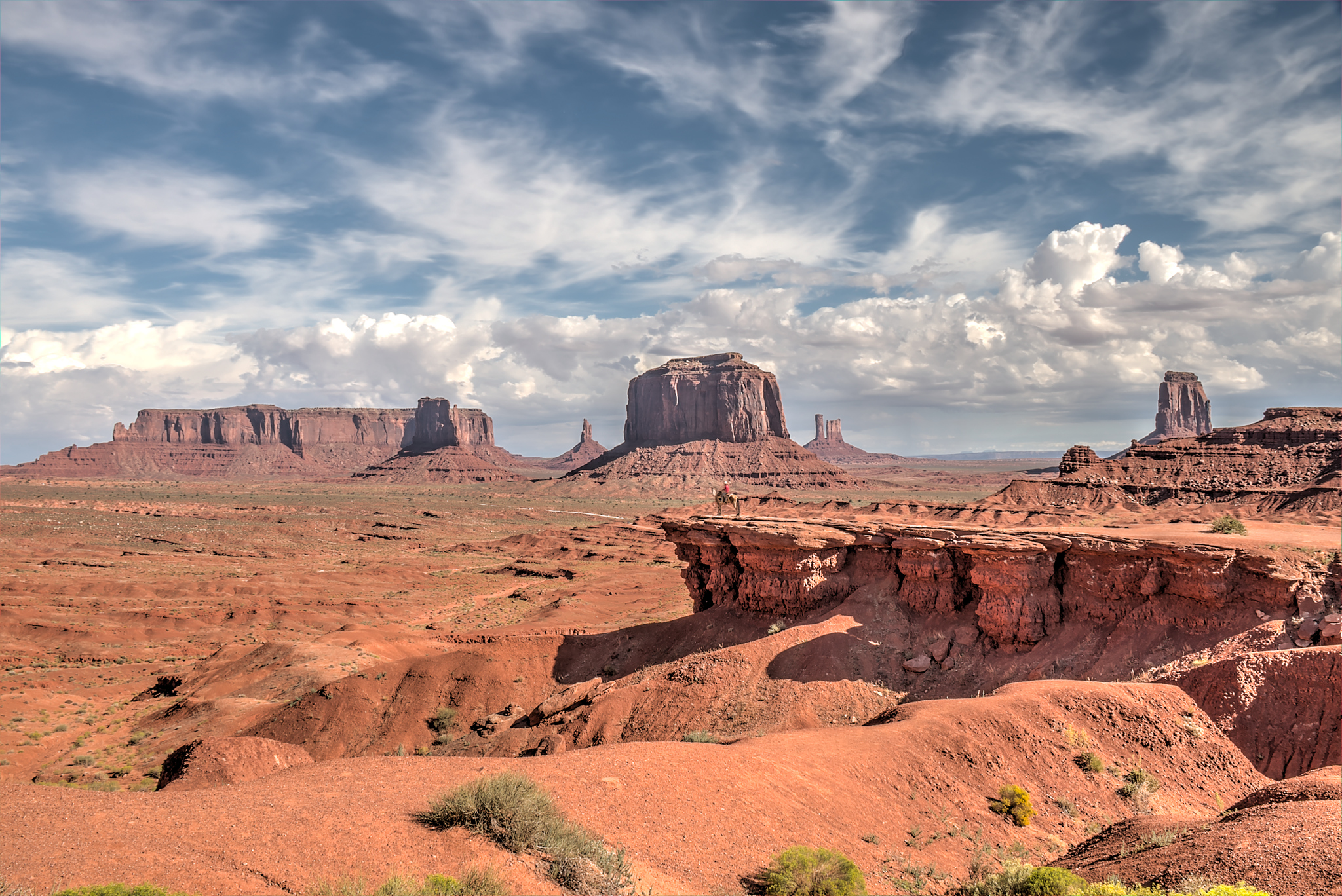
John Ford Point in Monument Valley in Arizona with dramatic buttes, a favorite film location setting for Ford

The members of the production crew were billeted in Kayenta, in Northeastern Arizona, in an old CCC camp. Conditions were spartan, production hours long, and weather conditions at the 5,700 ft (1,700 m) elevation were extreme, with constant strong winds and low temperatures. Nonetheless, director John Ford was satisfied with the crew's location work, which took place near Goulding's Trading Post on the Utah border, about 25 miles from Kayenta. Additional scenes were filmed in Monument Valley locations, as well as the Iverson Movie Ranch and the RKO Encino Ranch. The Apache attack sequences with riders on galloping horses and stunts by Yakima Canutt were filmed at Lucerne Dry Lake near Victorville in California. Stagecoach was the first of many Westerns that Ford shot using Monument Valley as a location, many of which also starred John Wayne. Anatopic incongruencies of landscape and vegetation are thus evident throughout the film, up to the closing scene of Ringo and Dallas departing Lordsburg, in the Chihuahuan Desert of southwestern New Mexico, by way of the unmistakable topography of Monument Valley's Colorado Plateau location.

== Reception ==
Original trailer for Stagecoach (1939)

The film was released on March 2, 1939, and met with immediate critical and trade paper praise. The picture cemented John Wayne's standing as an A-list leading man, and made a profit of $297,690. Cast member Louise Platt, in a letter recounting the experience of the film's production, quoted Ford on saying of Wayne's future in film: "He'll be the biggest star ever because he is the perfect 'everyman'". On Rotten Tomatoes, the film holds an approval rating of 100%, based on 46 reviews, with an average rating of 9.5/10. The site's consensus reads: "Typifying the best that the Western genre has to offer, Stagecoach is a rip-roaring adventure given dramatic heft by John Ford's dynamic direction and John Wayne's mesmerizing star turn."

Stagecoach has been lauded as one of the most influential films ever made. Orson Welles argued that it was a perfect textbook of filmmaking and claimed to have watched it more than 40 times in preparation for the making of Citizen Kane. In 1995, the film was deemed "culturally, historically, or aesthetically significant" by the United States Library of Congress and selected for preservation in their National Film Registry; it was also included in the Vatican's list of films that year under the category of "Art".

The film has been recognized as transcending the Western genre. Robert B. Pippin has observed that both the collection of characters and their journey "are archetypal rather than merely individual" and that the film is a "mythic representation of the American aspiration toward a form of politically meaningful equality." Nevertheless, its depiction of Native Americans is not above criticism. Writing in 2011, Roger Ebert noted, "The film's attitudes toward Native Americans are unenlightened. The Apaches are seen simply as murderous savages; there is no suggestion the white men have invaded their land."

In 2025, The Hollywood Reporter listed Stagecoach as having the best stunts of 1939.

== Awards and nominations ==
Award	Category	Nominee(s)	Result	Ref.
Academy Awards	Outstanding Production	Walter Wanger	Nominated	
Academy Awards	Best Director	John Ford	Nominated	
Academy Awards	Best Supporting Actor	Thomas Mitchell	Won	
Academy Awards	Best Art Direction	Alexander Toluboff	Nominated	
Academy Awards	Best Cinematography – Black-and-White	Bert Glennon	Nominated	
Academy Awards	Best Film Editing	Otho Lovering and Dorothy Spencer	Nominated	
Academy Awards	Best Scoring	Richard Hageman, W. Franke Harling, John Leipold, and Leo Shuken	Won	
National Board of Review Awards	Top Ten Films		3rd Place	
National Board of Review Awards	Best Acting	Thomas Mitchell	Won	
National Film Preservation Board	National Film Registry		Inducted	
New York Film Critics Circle Awards	Best Director	John Ford	Won	
Online Film & Television Association Awards	Hall of Fame – Motion Picture		Inducted	

=== American Film Institute ===
- In June 1998, the American Film Institute published its "AFI's 100 Years...100 Movies"—the 100 best American films, in the judgment of over 1,500 movie industry artists and leaders, who selected from a list of 400 nominated films. They ranked Stagecoach as #63 of the 100 best.
- In June 2008, the American Film Institute revealed its "Ten Top Ten"—the best ten films in ten "classic" American film genres—after polling over 1,500 people from the creative community. Stagecoach was acknowledged as the ninth best film in the Western genre.

== Re-releases and restoration ==
The film was originally released through United Artists, but under the terms of its seven-year-rights rule, the company surrendered distribution rights to producer Walter Wanger in 1946. Numerous companies have held the rights to the picture in the years since. The film's copyright (originally by Walter Wanger Productions) was renewed by 20th Century Fox, which produced a later 1966 remake of Stagecoach. The rights to the original 1939 film were subsequently acquired by Time-Life Films during the 1970s. The copyright has since been reassigned to Wanger Productions through the late producer's family under the Caidin Trust/Caidin Film Company, the ancillary rights holder. However, distribution rights are now held by Shout! Factory, which in 2014 acquired Jumer Productions/Westchester Films (which in turn had bought the Caidin Film holdings after the folding of former distributor Castle Hill Productions). Warner Bros. Pictures handles sales and additional distribution.

The original negative of Stagecoach was either lost or destroyed. Wayne had one unscreened positive print that director Peter Bogdanovich noticed in Wayne's garage while visiting. In 1970, Wayne allowed it to be used to produce a new negative, often seen at film festivals. UCLA fully restored the film in 1996 from surviving elements and premiered it on cable's American Movie Classics network. The previous DVD releases by Warner Home Video did not contain the restored print but rather a video print held in the Castle Hill/Caidin Trust library. A digitally restored Blu-ray/DVD version was released in May 2010 via The Criterion Collection.

== Lone Ranger radio play ==
The theme of the movie has been reproduced as a Lone Ranger radio episode "The Last Coach West", which played August 22, 1945. Most main characters in the movie had a counter-part in the radio play.

Character counter-parts
Movie character	Radio character
The Ringo Kid, protagonist, escaped from prison	The Waco Kid, suspected bank robber
Dallas, prostitute driven out of town	Joessy, dance-hall girl driven out of town
Doc Boone, alcoholic doctor	Doctor Taylor, alcoholic doctor
Lucy Mallory, pregnant	Phyllis Alden, wounded by arrow
Luke Plummer, killed Ringo Kid's father and brother	John Gall, framed Waco Kid
Marshal Curley Wilcox, arrested The Ringo Kid	Sheriff Beaker, arrested The Waco Kid
Henry Gatewood, a banker absconding with embezzled money	John Gall, loan-shark banker, frames Waco Kid
Samuel Peacock, whiskey salesman	Horace Pennypacker, whiskey salesman
Buck, stage driver	Pete Morley, stage driver

The plot of the radio play closely paralleled that of the movie in spite of the character changes, with exception of the Lone Ranger and Tonto heroically saving the stagecoach occupants from Geronimo's warriors.

The radio play run time was only about 22 minutes, less than one quarter of the movie's 96.

== Remakes ==
=== Radio ===
- The May 4, 1946, radio episode of Academy Award Theater had Claire Trevor reprise her role alongside Randolph Scott.
- The December 7, 1946, radio episode of Hollywood Star Time presented Stagecoach, adapted by Milton Geiger.
- The January 9, 1949, radio episode of Screen Directors Playhouse had John Wayne and Claire Trevor both reprise their parts.

=== Film ===
- The 1966 remake of Stagecoach stars (in alphabetical order) Ann-Margret as Dallas, Red Buttons as the whiskey drummer, Mike Connors as the gambler, Alex Cord as the Ringo Kid, Bing Crosby as Doc Boone, Robert Cummings as the embezzler, Van Heflin as the Marshal, Slim Pickens as Buck, Stefanie Powers as Lucy, and Keenan Wynn as Luke Plummer.

=== Television ===
- A 1986 television version features Willie Nelson as Doc Holliday, Kris Kristofferson as the Ringo Kid, Johnny Cash as the Marshal, Waylon Jennings as Hatfield, Tony Franciosa as the embezzler, John Schneider as Buck, Anthony Newley as the whiskey drummer, Elizabeth Ashley as Dallas, Mary Crosby as Lucy, June Carter Cash as Mrs. Pickett, and Jessi Colter as Martha.

== See also ==
- John Wayne filmography
- List of films with a 100% rating on Rotten Tomatoes, a film review aggregator website
