= Javier Ruiz Rueda =

Mexican composer and writer

Javier Ruiz Rueda (March 18, 1909 – September 8, 1993) was a Mexican composer and writer. He was born in Mexico City.

== Achievements ==
Javier Ruiz Rueda was part of the great composers alongside Agustín Lara. His major musical works include Cosas del Amor and Dulce Aventura, for which he composed the music and José Antonio Zorrilla wrote the lyrics.

Javier Ruiz Rueda also wrote jingles for radio; probably the most popular jingle is "Estaban los tomatitos ..." for which he composed the music and Ramiro Gamboa wrote the lyrics.

In the 1940s Soledad Orozco, wife of President Manuel Ávila Camacho, became active in the "League of Decency" (Spanish: Liga de la decencia), a censorious conservative group that campaigned against indecency. The popular bolero was one of its targets, because of lyrics the League considered scandalous. Javier Ruiz Rueda was one of their targets and they succeeded in having one of his songs banned.

He co-wrote, with José Antonio Zorrilla, the song "¿Qué pasa mi cuate?" recorded by Pedro Infante in 1946. He also co-wrote the screenplay for the 1950 film El amor no es negocio.

== Literary achievements ==
Javier Ruiz Rueda worked with many composers and was friend to many of them. His passion for history and writing led him to write a biography of Agustín Lara: Agustín Lara: vida y pasiones.

== Last years ==
Javier Ruiz Rueda died on September 8, 1993.
