= Rosa (album) =

Studio album by Agustín Lara
- Released: 1958
- Genre: Bolero
- Label: RCA Victor

Rosa is an album of bolero music by Mexican composer and singer Agustín Lara ("Su piano y sus ritmos"). It was released in 1958 on the RCA Victor label.

In a 2024 ranking of the 600 greatest Latin American albums, Rosa was ranked No. 25. Reviewer José Luis Mercado called it "a fundamental piece to understand the essence and legacy of Agustín Lara" and "a testament to Lara's unique ability to express the deepest feelings of love and nostalgia through his lyrical poetry and emotional melodies."

== Track listing ==
Side A

1. Noche De Ronda
2. Maria Bonita
3. Rosa
4. Rival
5. Noche Criolla
6. Tus Pupilas

Side B

1. Santa
2. Farolito
3. Amor De Mis Amores
4. Como Dos Puñales
5. Tu Retrato
6. Pervertida
