= Château de Lourmarin =

Castle in France

Coordinates: 43°45′52″N 5°21′31″E

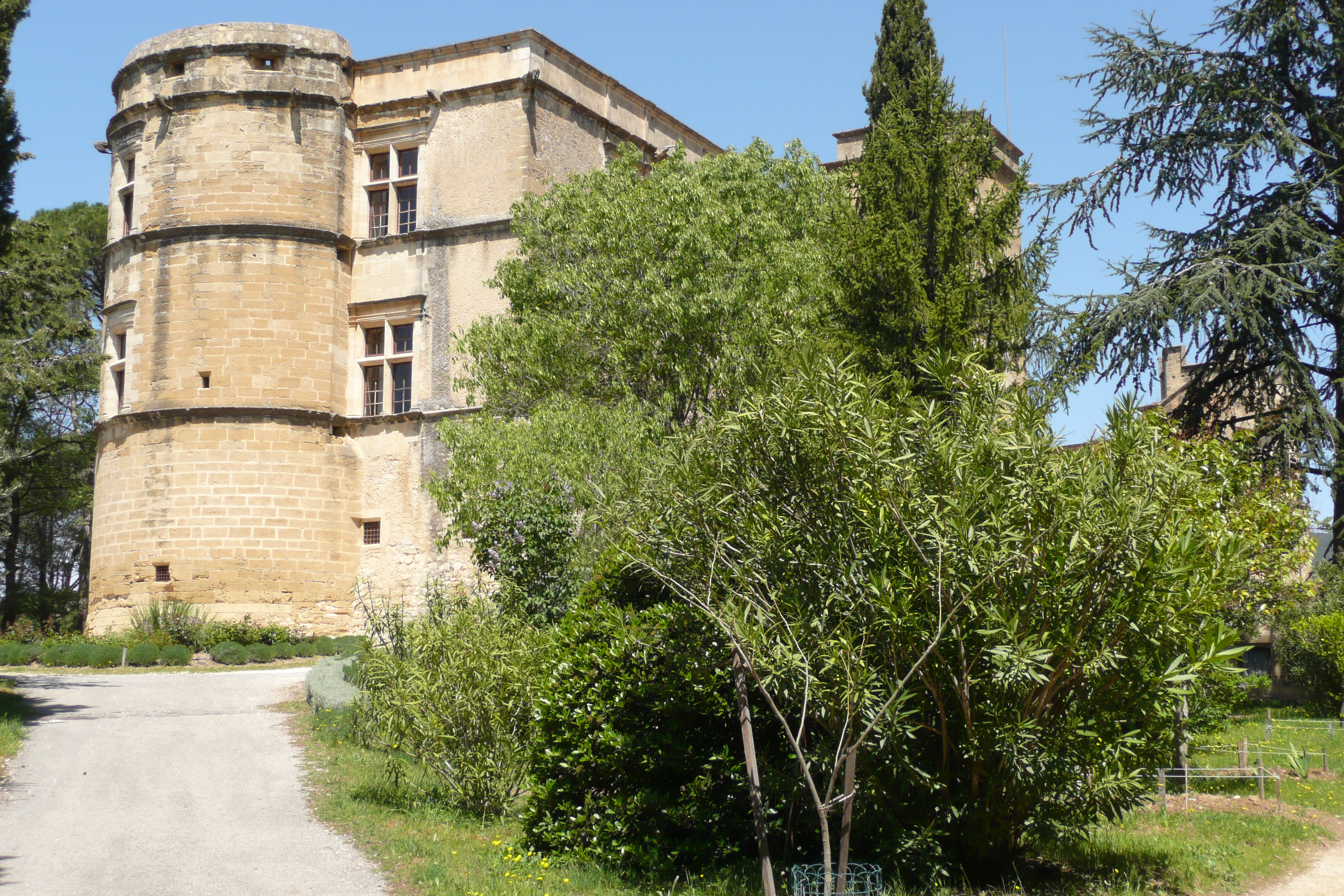
Lourmarin Castle from the west

The Château de Lourmarin is a converted castle located in the town of Lourmarin which is situated in the Vaucluse département, in the Provence-Alpes-Côte d’Azur region of France.

Originally a 12th-century fortress, it was transformed in the 15th century by Foulques d'Agoult, chamberlain of King Rene I. of Anjou. After 1526 the castle belonged to Louis d’Agoult-Montauban and his wife Blanche de Lévis-Ventadour and the new annex made the building the first Renaissance building in the Provence Region.

Afterwards the castle became the residence of the Créqui-Lesdiguières family, who were the lords of Château de La Tour d'Aigues. Despite owning the castle, they never took residence in it, and this state of affairs continued until the beginning of the French Revolution.

After the Revolution, and despite having two more owners, the castle slowly descended into ruins.

Finally, in 1920, Robert Laurent-Vibert, a producer of cosmetics, bought the ruined castle and employed the architect Henri Pacon to restore it. In 1925, Laurent-Vibert died in a car accident. In his will he donated the castle to the Académie des Sciences, Agriculture, Arts et Belles Lettres under condition that it should be transformed into a trust, which would support young artists.

The castle was used for exterior shots in Julien Duvivier's 1939 film The End of the Day.

== See also ==
- List of castles in France
