= Sergio de Karlo =

Cuban composer and actor

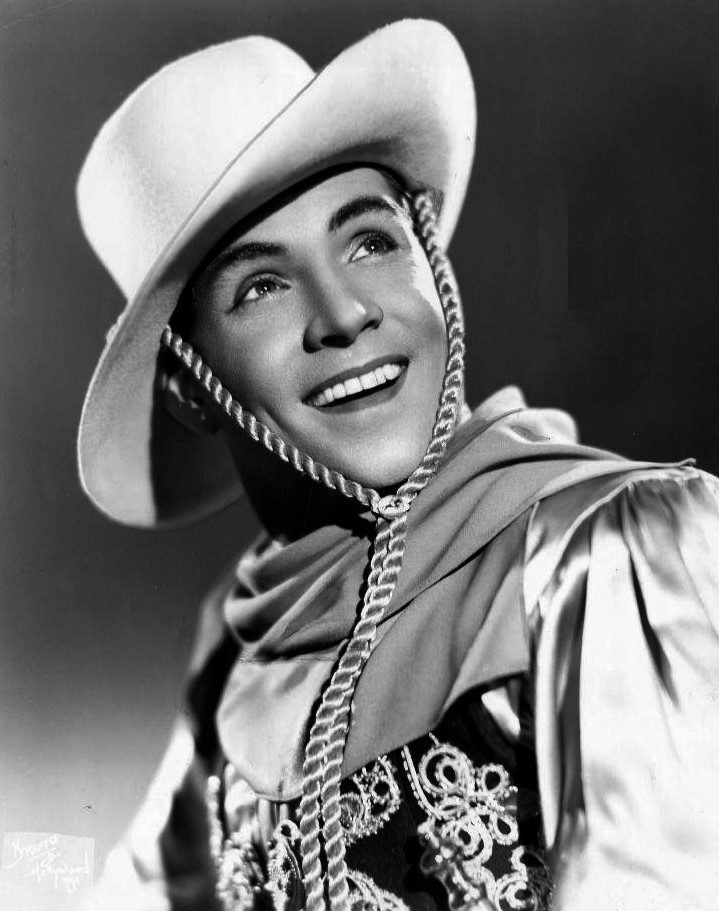
De Karlo in 1944.

Sergio de Karlo (December 15, 1911 – January 10, 2010) was a Cuban composer, singer and actor, considered the maestro of the Cuban Bolero. He composed more than 300 rumbas and boleros. De Karlo was named "Artist of the Year" in 1942 by Billboard Magazine.

== Biography ==
Born in pre-revolutionary Havana, Cecilio Lopez (later changed to Sergio De Karlo) grew up on a large estate outside of central Havana. With his upbringing left largely to the care of his nanny, Sergio's earliest musical experiences were rooted in the techniques of Afro-Cuban rhythms. These rhythms combined with the traditional music of Spain, constituted the advent of the Cuban Bolero.

== Immigration to the United States ==
At the age of 14, Sergio became a professional entertainer with a role as a chorus boy in a musical created by Cuban composer Ernesto Lecuona. Shortly thereafter, Sergio ventured out on his own, forming "Arittola," one of the first jazz bands in Cuba. Forced to flee from his homeland because of a complicated romance, Sergio went to New York City. Sergio found a job as a dancer at a Chinese restaurant.

=== Early career ===
Befriended by The Gills, a brother and sister vaudeville team, Sergio was asked to perform his own material during their costume changes at the Winter Garden Theatre in Manhattan. When Sergio wrote the show's hit song, "Last of the Rumba's", bandleaders such as Andre Kostelanetz and Xavier Cugat quickly began to play it on their radio shows.

Irving Berlin, fascinated by the young man's knowledge of Afro-Cuban rhythms, offered Sergio a publishing contract for one of his compositions called "Bagoo", a song about island life in Cuba.

== Mexican Debut ==
In 1934, Sergio studied music with the world-renowned composer Agustín Lara, the composer of numerous hits including the Spanish standard "Granada." At this time, Sergio made his Mexican debut at the Olympia Theatre in Mexico City, where he wrote several songs for a new movie, including the ballad "Flores Negras." This song became an enormous hit, propelling Sergio to major stardom throughout Mexico. It also became an international hit, eventually being recorded by artists such as Bing Crosby, Gene Autry, Lawrence Welk, Eydie Gormé with Los Panchos, Ana Gabriel and many others.

== Life on Broadway ==
During the early 1940s, Sergio plays opposite Carmen Miranda at the Versailles Club in Manhattan and appears with Xavier Cugat at the Waldorf Astoria in Manhattan. He co-stars in the Michael Todd/Cole Porter musical "Mexican Hayride" which runs for four years on Broadway at the Winter Garden Theatre. In 1940, Sergio appears in the Rodgers and Hart Broadway production of "Too Many Girls," replacing the Hollywood-bound Desi Arnaz as a Cuban heartthrob.

== "Ambassador of Melody" ==
In 1942, Sergio wrote a song for President Franklin D. Roosevelt called "Mr. Franklin D." In appreciation of this, the President gave Sergio the honorary title of "Ambassador of Melody". During this time, Sergio toured Hawaii with the King Sisters, Edgar Bergen and Martha Raye on behalf of the war effort.

== Hollywood Star ==
As his career flourished in New York City, Sergio was invited to Hollywood to audition for the leading role in the picture The Life of Rudolph Valentino. He also landed a supporting role in the Alan Ladd/Paramount Pictures film Captain Carey, U.S.A. Playing an Italian minstrel, Sergio introduced the ballad "Mona Lisa" to the world. This song won the Academy Award for best song of 1950 and was later recorded by Nat King Cole.

Returning to Mexico City in 1950, Sergio starred in several feature films. Along with scoring many other theatrical productions, his songwriting ability and nightclub appearances render him the toast of Mexico. After achieving great success for many years in Mexico, Sergio eventually moved to Los Angeles, California where he continued to compose and arrange his music. He married his longtime love Gracy Lopez and had 5 children. De Karlo died at the age of 98 in San Gabriel, California.
