= Dos cruces =

Single by Jorge Gallarzo
- B-side: "Manuela Cruz"
- Released: 1952
- Recorded: 1952
- Genre: Bolero
- Length: 2:55
- Label: Odeón
- Songwriter: Carmelo Larrea

"Dos cruces" is famous Spanish bolero composed by Carmelo Larrea in 1952. The song earned Larrea his second golden record in 1954. Originally entitled "Soledad" (Solitude), it was first recorded by Jorge Gallarzo. Over 80 artists have performed the song ever since, including Niño de Murcia (1957), Angelillo (1958), Caterina Valente (1958), José Feliciano (1965), Los Relámpagos (1965), Umberto Marcato (1958), Milton Nascimento (1972), Ney Matogrosso (1975), Nana Mouskouri (1990) and Roberto Alagna (2011). The lyrics begin "Sevilla tuvo que ser, con su lunita plateada..." and tell of the moonlit skyline of Seville witnessing the love of a couple.
