= California Theatre (Los Angeles) =

Former movie theater in Los Angeles, California, United States

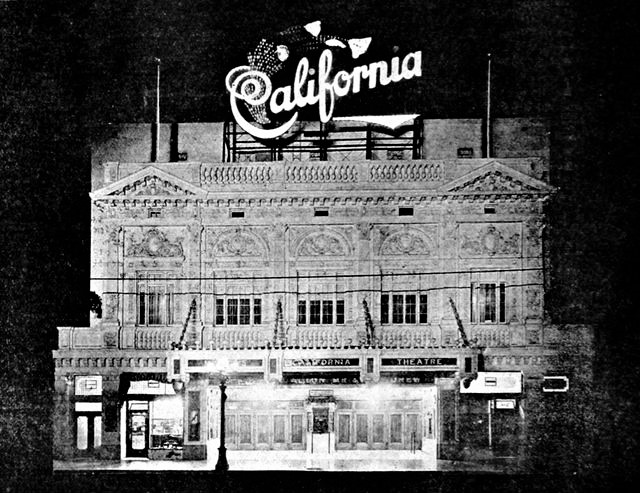
- California Theatre c. 1921
- Interactive map of California Theatre
- Former names: Miller's California Theatre
- Address: 810 S. Main Street; Los Angeles, California; United States
- Coordinates: 34.0423°N 118.2534°W
- Capacity: 2,000
- Type: Movie theater

Construction
- Opened: December 24, 1918
- Closed: 1987
- Demolished: 1990
- Architect: Alex B. Rosenthal

The California Theatre was a Beaux-Arts cinema at 810 S. Main Street in Downtown Los Angeles. It opened December 24, 1918 by Fred Miller as Miller's California Theatre. It originally housed 2,000, later capacity was lowered to 1,650. The architect was Alex B. Rosenthal, who also designed the Granada Theatre in Santa Barbara, California. Goldwyn Pictures bought the cinema in 1919 and hired Samuel L. "Roxy" Rothafel to manage it. From 1935 till 1983 it operated as Teatro California, showing Spanish-language films. As the Historic Core district no longer was the shopping and entertainment center of the city after the 1950s, it became more and more difficult to make a profit. After 1983 it operated as a grindhouse and afterwards showed pornographic films as a branch of the Pussycat Theaters. The theater closed in 1987 and despite objections was demolished in 1990.
