= 1939 New York Film Critics Circle Awards =

5th New York Film Critics Circle Awards

5th New York Film Critics Circle Awards

December 27, 1939

Best Film:
Wuthering Heights

The 5th New York Film Critics Circle Awards, announced on 27 December 1939, honored the best filmmaking of 1939.

== Winners ==
- Best Picture:
  - Wuthering Heights
- Runner-up – Gone with the Wind and Mr. Smith Goes to Washington
- Best Actor:
  - James Stewart – Mr. Smith Goes to Washington
- Best Actress:
  - Vivien Leigh – Gone with the Wind
- Best Director:
  - John Ford – Stagecoach
- Best Foreign Film:
  - Harvest (Regain) • France
