= Agustín Lara =

Mexican composer (1897–1970)

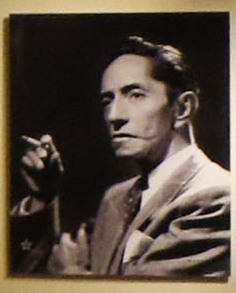
- Lara, c. 1950s
- Born: October 30, 1897; Tlacotalpan, Veracruz, Mexico
- Died: November 6, 1970 (aged 73); Mexico City, Mexico
- Resting place: Rotonda de las Personas Ilustres, Mexico City, Mexico
- Occupations: Composer; singer; performer
- Years active: 1915–1970
- Notable work: "Granada"; "Solamente una vez (You Belong to My Heart)"; "Piensa en mí"; Rosa
- Spouses: María Félix (m. 1945; div. 1947); Yolanda Santacruz Gasca; Rocío Durán; Clara Martínez; Vianey Lárraga
- Children: 3 (one former adopted daughter)
- Relatives: María Teresa Lara (sister); Enrique Álvarez Félix (stepson)
- Awards: Honored by Francisco Franco with a house in Granada; received honors internationally

Ángel Agustín María Carlos Fausto Mariano Alfonso del Sagrado Corazón de Jesús Lara y Aguirre del Pino (Note: Latin American Spanish pronunciation: [ˈaŋxel aɣusˈtim maˈɾi.a ˈkaɾlos ˈfawsto maˈɾjano alˈfonso ðel saˈɣɾaðo koɾaˈson de xeˈsus ˈlaɾa i aˈɣire ðel ˈpino].) (October 30, 1897 – November 6, 1970), known simply as Agustín Lara, (Note: Spanish pronunciation: [aɣusˈtin ˈlaɾa].) was a Mexican composer and performer of songs and boleros. He is recognized as one of the most popular songwriters of his era. His work was widely appreciated not only in Mexico but also in Central and South America, the Caribbean and Spain. After his death, he has also been recognized in the United States, Italy, and Japan. His 1958 bolero album Rosa has been rated as one of the top 25 albums in the history of Latin American music.

Notable performers of his work include Pedro Vargas who was a friend, Juan Arvizu, Nestor Mesta Chayres, Pedro Infante, Toña la Negra, Elvira Ríos, Javier Solís, Julio Iglesias, Vicente Fernández, Pérez Prado, Chavela Vargas, Manuel Mijares, Luis Miguel, and Natalia Lafourcade among others.

Outside the Spanish speaking world, his most famous songs are "Granada", "Solamente una vez (You Belong to My Heart)" and "Piensa en mí", which have both been recorded by numerous international singers, including Enrico Caruso, Mario Lanza, and José Carreras.

== Biography ==
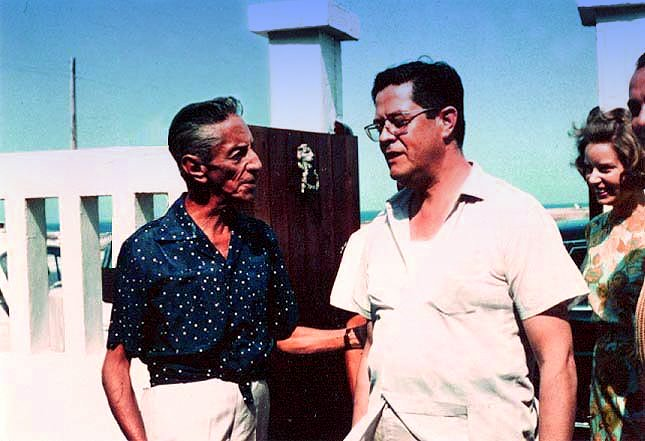
The Eng. Guillermo González Camarena, with Agustín Lara.

Lara was born in Tlacotalpan, Veracruz to Joaquín Lara and María Aguirre del Pino. Later, the Lara family had to move to Mexico City, establishing their house in the borough of Coyoacán. After their mother died, Agustín and his siblings lived in a hospice run by their aunt. It was there that he had his first contact with music.

Lara's first musical composition was "Marucha", written in honor of one of his first loves. In 1927 he already was working in cabarets. It was around this time that he was involved in an argument with a showgirl named Estrella, who slashed him in the face with a broken bottle, leaving a distinct scar (a Glasgow smile) on his cheek. He subsequently moved to Puebla, but returned to Mexico City in 1928. That same year he started working for the tenor Juan Arvizu as composer and accompanist. In September 1930, Lara began a successful radio career. At the same time he acted and composed songs for such films as Santa.

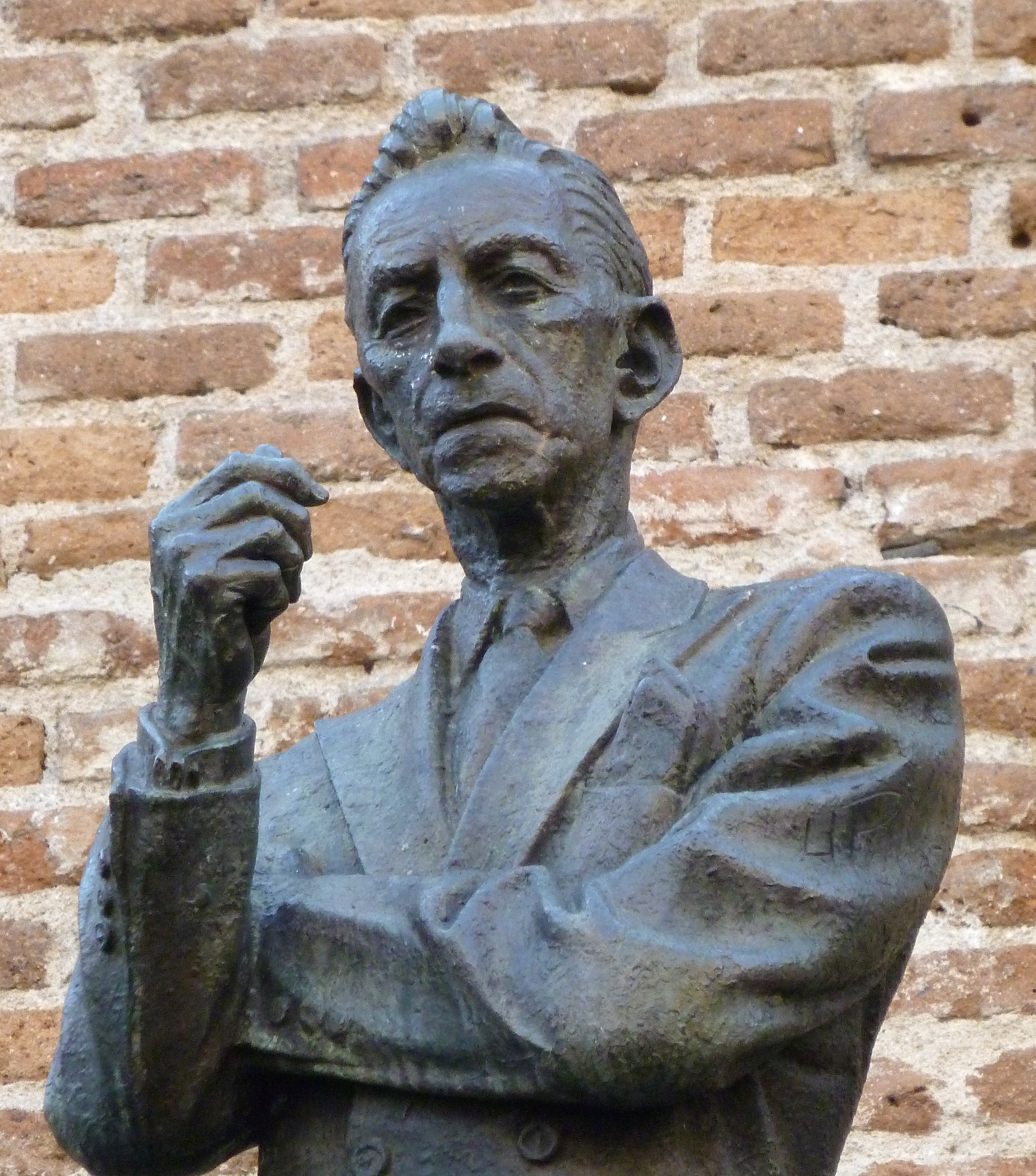
Statue of A. Lara in Madrid, by sculptor Humberto Peraza

Lara's first tour, to Cuba in 1933, was a failure because of political turmoil on the island. Later, more successful tours in South America, as well as such new compositions as "Solamente una vez" (composed in Buenos Aires and dedicated to José Mojica), "Veracruz", "Tropicana", and "Pecadora" increased his fame.

In 1934 he went to Los Angeles, where he did multiple concerts at the California Theatre. He would later return to the city to write songs for Tropic Holiday (1938), a musical film.

By the beginning of the 1940s, Lara was well known in Spain. In 1965, the Spanish dictator Francisco Franco, gave him a house in Granada to show his appreciation of Lara's songs with Spanish themes, such as "Toledo", "Cuerdas de mi guitarra", "Granada", "Sevilla" and "Madrid". He received additional honors and decorations from around the world.

His career was portrayed in the 1959 Mexican film The Life of Agustín Lara.

In 1968, Lara's health began to decline rapidly; and a fall that occurred on October 16, 1970, fractured his pelvis. He was hospitalized under the false name of Carlos Flores, but the press learned about his hospitalization anyway. The next day, October 17, 1970, he experienced cardiorespiratory arrest in the elevator while being transferred to the intensive care unit. He never regained consciousness, and on November 6, 1970, Lara died. He was buried in Mexico City. By the time of his death, Lara had written more than 700 songs.

A biography of him, Agustín Lara: Vida y pasiones, was written by his friend Javier Ruiz Rueda.

== Family ==
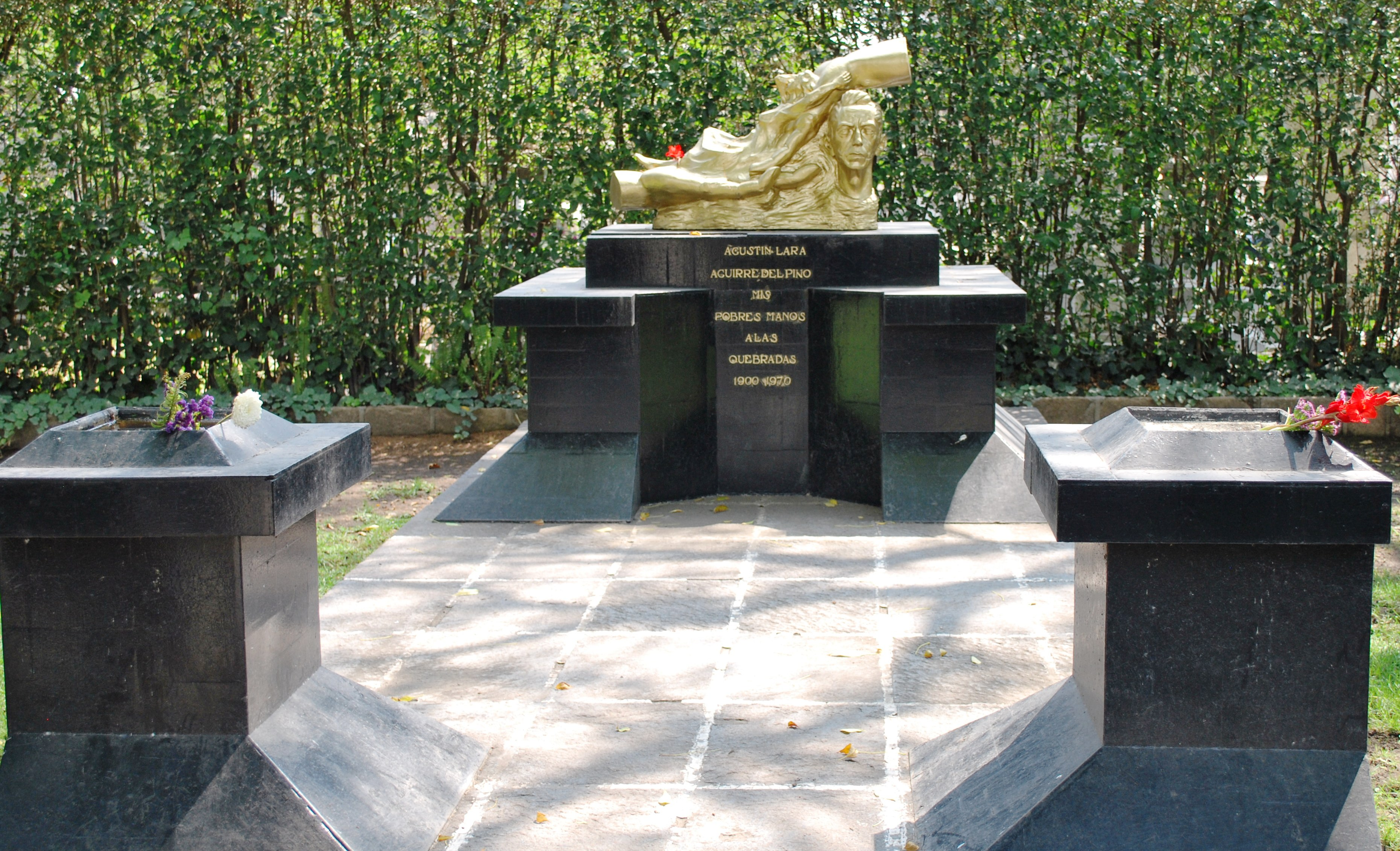
Grave of Agustín Lara External audio: You may hear Lara's bolero Granada as sung by Nestor Mesta Chayres with la Orquesta Alfredo Antonini and John Serry Sr. in 1946 Here on archive.org

Agustín was a son of Joaquín Lara and his wife María Aguirre del Pino, and he had an aunt named Refugio Aguirre del Pino. His younger sister was composer María Teresa Lara, and some of his songs such as "Noche de ronda" and "Piensa en mí" were copyrighted in her name. He married María Félix and Rocío Durán (whom he adopted) and was a stepfather to the actor Enrique Álvarez Félix, who died in 1996.

Sons of Lara are Gerardo Agustín Lara Santacruz (with sixth wife Yolanda Santacruz Gasca) and Agustín Lara Lárraga (biological son of actress Vianey Lárraga, one of Lara's wives).

== Discography ==
Lara made recordings in small and larger ensemble settings.

- Agustín Lara (RCA Victor 1953, 10” rec.; 1958 expanded LP reissue as Rosa)
- Invitación al romance (RCA Victor 1952, 10” rec.; 1956 expanded LP reissue)
- The Music of Agustin Lara (RCA Victor, 1955, 10" rec.; 1960 expanded LP reissue as Composiciones de Agustin Lara)
- Agustín Lara, su voz y piano (RCA Victor, 1956)
- Suite española (RCA Victor, 1957)
- Tesoro mio (RCA Victor, 1957)
- El músico poeta Agustín Lara (Orfeon, 1966)
- El músico poeta (Orfeon, 3 LP set, 1966)

=== Collaborations ===
- Recordando lo primero de... Pedro Vargas y Agustín Lara (RCA Camden archival recordings, ca. 1947-1954)
- La hora íntima (RCA Victor, 1960) with Pedro Vargas and Toña la Negra
- Las canciones de mi compadre...(RCA Victor, 1967; reissued in 1968 as Pedro Vargas y Agustín Lara on RCA Camden) with Pedro Vargas and Conjunto de Pepe Agüeros

== Selected filmography ==
- Melodies of America (1941)
- The Devourer (1946)
- Mujer en condominio (1958) including the song "Arroyito", composed and sung by Lara in the film
