= María Teresa Lara =

Mexican lyricist and composer (1904–1984)

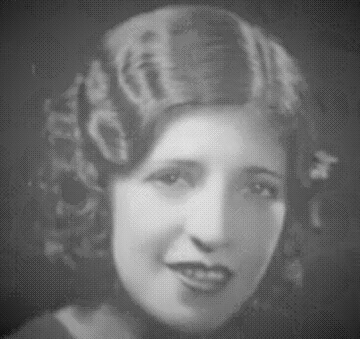
- Born: María Teresa Lara Aguirre del Pino; 1904; Tlatlauquitepec, Puebla, Mexico
- Died: May 23, 1984 (aged 79–80); Mexico City, Mexico
- Occupations: Lyricist; composer
- Spouse: Nicanor Guzmán Guerrero
- Relatives: Agustín Lara (brother)

María Teresa Lara Aguirre del Pino (1904 – May 23, 1984) was a Mexican lyricist and composer.

== Family ==
Lara was a daughter of Joaquín M. Lara and his wife, María Aguirre del Pino. Her aunt was Refugio Aguirre del Pino and her elder brother was Agustín Lara, who was a songwriter and composer, singer and actor. Her sister-in-law was María Félix, mother of actor Enrique Álvarez Félix, who appeared in many telenovelas. She was married to Nicanor Guzmán Guerrero (1909–1992).

Lara worked with her brother Agustín on several songs. Some of Agustín Lara's songs were copyrighted in her name.

== Works, editions and recordings ==
- "Me dejaste"
- "Valencia"
- "Toledo" – recorded on recital ¡Ay, ay, ay!
