= Orfeón (Mexican record label) =

Mexican record label

- Founded: 1957
- Founder: Rogelio Azcárraga Madero
- Country of origin: Mexico
- Official website: orfeon.com.mx

Orfeón is a record label from Mexico, which has released many recordings for the Latin American market since at least the 1950s.

In 1961, after having released Mexican editions of several of their Decca Records singles, the label signed American rockers Bill Haley & His Comets and the band had numerous regional hits on the label, most notably the partial instrumental "Florida Twist" and the Spanish-language "Twist Espanol", during their tenure that lasted until early 1966. The label also sponsored a musical television series, Orfeón a Go-Go (which included appearances by Haley, among other acts from the label).

Orfeón was affiliated with the Dimsa label in the 1960s, releasing some material (including a number of Haley albums) under this label. Another major American act that recorded for the label was Big Joe Turner in 1966 (his recordings were backed by Haley's Comets, and Turner performed one of the songs along with Haley and the Comets on an episode of Orfeón a Go-Go).

Orfeón was licensed to distribute in Mexico recording of some artists outside of its own roster of performers. Examples of these artists include Dalida (born Iolanda Cristina Gigliotti) and Machito.

== See also ==
- List of record labels
